= Elizabeth Gray (broadcaster) =

Canadian radio broadcaster (1937–2023)

- Gray, c. 1980s
- Born: Elizabeth Binks; April 26, 1937; Toronto, Ontario, Canada
- Died: October 25, 2023 (aged 86); Toronto, Ontario, Canada
- Occupation: Radio broadcaster
- Spouse: John Gray

Elizabeth Gray (née Binks; April 26, 1937 – October 25, 2023) was a Canadian journalist and radio broadcaster who through much of her career worked as a host and documentary producer for CBC Radio.

== Life and career ==
Born in Toronto, her parents were George Binks, of Lachine, Québec, and Enid Watts Binks, of Letterston, Wales. Elizabeth graduated from Havergal College and studied English at the University of Toronto. Her journalistic work started there, at the student newspaper, The Varsity, then edited by Peter Gzowski, where she also met fellow reporter John Gray, whom she married shortly after they graduated. She worked at the Toronto Telegram (and he at the Toronto Daily Star) for several months, and then they moved to London, England, where they lived for five years. From the UK, she wrote for a number of Canadian periodicals, including Maclean's, Star Weekly, Weekend, Chatelaine, and newspapers including the Telegram and the Montreal Star, under the byline Elizabeth Binks or Liz Binks. She contributed pieces to the CBC program, Countdown, and then continued to freelance for the broadcaster.

They returned to Canada in 1965, Based in Montreal, Gray produced radio programs for the CBC, including the weekly phone-in broadcast, Cross-Country Checkup. She later hosted the weekly broadcast, from 1976 to 1978. Relocating to Ottawa in 1969, she continued to contribute freelance to local CBC radio broadcasts, including hosting CBC radio's first afternoon drive-time talk show, Now...Just Listen!, at CBO, the morning program CBO Morning, and a weekly conversation with federal politicians, Politically Speaking. She also appeared on national programs, including items on the political program, Capital Report, and guest-hosting This Country in the Morning. She was featured on This Country's successor, Morningside, in a weekly series of audio essays titled "Shades of Gray." Her 1975 documentary, "The Supreme Court in Canada," which aired on CBC Tuesday Night, earned her an ACTRA award for "Best Writing, Radio Documentary." In summer 1976, she hosted Olympic Magazine, CBC radio's coverage of the Montreal Olympic Games. In 1979 she presented an open-line show on the Ottawa commercial radio station, CKOY. By the end of the decade, she was thinking that her broadcasting career had stalled. She was negotiating a return to print journalism, at Maclean's, but then faced two options that might keep her on the air at the CBC. One was the opportunity to co-host The Journal, a new television current-affairs program featuring Barbara Frum, and the other was the chance to replace Frum on the radio network's flagship interview show, As It Happens, which she had guest-hosted a number of times. Pursuing the last option, Gray took over from Frum on As It Happens in September 1981.

In April 1984, ACTRA presented Gray its annual honour for excellence in broadcast journalism, the Gordon Sinclair Award. The next year, in a controversial decision by the show's producers, at the end of the broadcast season her contract was not renewed. She presented her last As It Happens program on June 14, 1985, and was replaced that September by Dennis Trudeau. Toronto Star entertainment columnist Sid Adilman saw her as a "scapegoat" for problems with the broadcast, which had already endured staff changes, had been shortened from 90 minutes to one hour, and was slipping in the ratings. News of Gray's dismissal attracted some 200 letters of protest from listeners, objections from other high-profile fellow journalists including Allan Fotheringham and Richard Gwyn, and petitions from 23 parliamentary reporters and more than 100 CBC producers and hosts. Some responded in kind by putting Gray back on the air, on other programs, including the television chat show, Midday, and the weekly political roundup on CBC radio, The House. She subsequently produced and presented radio segments for Sunday Morning, initially on a thirteen-week contract that was renewed when it ended. For years thereafter, from across Canada and throughout the world, Gray produced dozens of features for the program and its successor, The Sunday Edition. Relocating with husband John Gray to London in 1987, and Moscow in 1991, then returning to Canada in 1994, she continued to produce audio documentaries for the CBC until her retirement, as she approached age 70.

She won the 1986 ACTRA National Radio Award as "Best Interviewer," for her work on Sunday Morning, and, in 1988, the association's Norman DePoe Award for investigative journalism, for her feature, "In South Africa, I Would Be White."

After having been admitted to hospital following a heart attack in September 2023, she died from lung cancer on October 25, 2023, at the age of 86. She is survived by her children, Colin, Rachel, and Joshua Gray, all of Toronto.
