= Michael Enright (broadcaster) =

Canadian journalist (born 1943)

Michael Enright CM (born 1943) is a Canadian journalist and radio broadcaster. A high school dropout, Enright became a journalist after taking a University of Toronto extension course. As a journalist he held numerous positions at organizations such as The Globe and Mail, Time and Maclean's. He is best known for his long tenure as a CBC Radio host. Enright was the host of CBC Radio One's The Sunday Edition from 2000 to 2020 and previously hosted As It Happens from 1987 until 1997 and co-hosted This Morning from 1997 to 2000. From 2009 until 2019, he hosted the archive show Rewind on CBC Radio One. He retired from CBC radio in 2020. Enright was the recipient of two honorary doctorates and was named a Member of the Order of Canada in 2017.

== Early life and education ==
Enright grew up in Toronto, Ontario. He attended St. Michael's College School, a Catholic all-boys school in Toronto, but dropped out before finishing. After he took a University of Toronto extension course, he found a job in Brampton, Ontario working for a weekly newspaper. Jobs in Kitchener-Waterloo and a Welsh television followed this. By the time he was 25, he had landed a position as The Globe and Mail's Washington, D.C. bureau chief.

== Career ==
Enright first joined CBC Radio in 1974 as host of This Country in the Morning for one year. He was then a print journalist for Time, Maclean's, the Toronto Star and The Globe and Mail. He subsequently returned to CBC, becoming managing editor of CBC radio news in 1985, and then became cohost of As It Happens in 1987. He hosted that program with Alan Maitland until 1993, and with Barbara Budd until 1997.

In a May 10, 1997 article in the Globe and Mail, Enright referred to the Roman Catholic Church as "the greatest criminal organization outside the Mafia", causing some outcry from Catholic organizations. Enright attended St. Michael's College School, a Catholic all-boys school, was lead altar boy at Holy Rosary Church and spent one year at a Passionist seminary in Dunkirk, New York.

In 1997, when Peter Gzowski retired from CBC Radio, the network discontinued Gzowski's Morningside and Ian Brown's Sunday Morning, replacing both with the new This Morning. Enright and Avril Benoit hosted the program for two years. Benoit subsequently became host of CBC's local afternoon show in Toronto, Here and Now, and Enright continued as the sole host of This Morning.

In 2000, CBC split This Morning's Sunday broadcast back into a distinct show. Enright became the host of Sunday Edition, a position he would hold from 2000 to 2020. From 2009 until 2019, he also hosted the archive show Rewind on CBC Radio One.

On May 24, 2020, Enright announced that after two decades as host, he would be leaving The Sunday Edition at the end of June and would host a new one-hour CBC Radio programme in the fall.

== Awards ==
He was awarded an "Honorary Degree Doctor of Letters, honoris causa" at the 98th Spring Convocation of St. Thomas University in Fredericton, New Brunswick on May 18, 2008. Enright, who never finished high school, had previously said that he would have preferred an honorary high school diploma; in June 2009, he was finally granted this wish.

In June 2012, Enright received an honorary Doctor of Laws degree from York University in Toronto. In 2013, Enright was inducted into the Order of Canada as a Member.
