= 13th ACTRA Awards =

Canadian television awards ceremony

- Date: April 3, 1984
- Hosted by: Laurier LaPierre, Ann Mortifee, Jayne Eastwood

Highlights
- Best TV Program: The Undaunted
- Best Radio Program: The Panther and the Jaguar

Television/radio coverage
- Network: CBC Television

The 13th ACTRA Awards were presented on April 3, 1984. The ceremony was hosted by Laurier LaPierre, Ann Mortifee and Jayne Eastwood.

== Television ==
Best Television Program	Best Children's Television Program
The Undaunted; Ready for Slaughter; Stratasphere: Portrait of Teresa Stratas	In the Fall; Sharon, Lois and Bram at Young People's Theatre; You Can't Do That on Television
Best Television Actor	Best Television Actress
Kenneth Welsh, Empire, Inc.; Robert Joy, Out of Sight, Out of Mind; Kevin Noble, Joey	Linda Griffiths, Empire, Inc.; Martha Henry, Empire, Inc.; Elva Mai Hoover, Anne's Story; Karen Woolridge, Anne's Story
Best Continuing TV Performance	Best Supporting TV Performance
Wendy Crewson, Home Fires; Louis Del Grande, Seeing Things; Gerard Parkes, Home Fires	Gabriel Arcand, Empire, Inc.; Tom Harvey, A Case of Libel; Lyn Jackson, Empire, Inc.
Best TV Variety Performance	Best Television Host
Richard McMillan, The Mikado; Ben Gordon, Anatomy of Laughter; Oscar Peterson, Oscar and Jorge	Barry Callaghan, Enterprise; Laurier LaPierre, Vancouver Show; Elwy Yost, Saturday Night at the Movies
Best Writing, Television Comedy/Variety	Best Writing, Television Drama
Dick Blasucci, John Candy, Bob Dolman, Joe Flaherty, Paul Flaherty, Eugene Levy, Andrea Martin, John McAndrew, Martin Short, Michael Short, Doug Steckler and Mary Charlotte Wilcox, SCTV; Rick Drew and Phil Savath, Carroll Baker's Jamboree; Jack Kahane, Paul Grosney and Archie Cham, Bizarre; Roger Price and Geoffrey Darby, You Can't Do That on Television	Douglas Bowie, Empire, Inc.; Sheldon Chad, Seeing Things; Sugith Varughese, The Best of Both Worlds
Best Writing, Television Public Affairs
Robert Collison, Prisoners of Debt: Inside a Global Banking Crisis; Gwynne Dyer, War; Eric Malling and Mike Lavoie, The Fifth Estate: "Canadair - A Shareholder's Report"

== Radio ==
Best Radio Program	Best Radio Host
The Panther and the Jaguar; Joshua Then and Now; Testament: The Thunder and the Word, A Life of Martin Luther	Vicki Gabereau, Variety Tonight; Peter Gzowski, Morningside; Otto Lowy, The Transcontinental
Best Radio Actor	Best Radio Actress
Sean Mulcahy, The Panther and the Jaguar; Otto Lowy, Kafka in Love; Saul Rubinek, Joshua Then and Now	Patricia Phillips, The Diviners; Lillian Carlson, The Young in One Another's Arms; Dixie Seatle, Penny Henley
Best Radio Variety Performance	Best Writing, Radio Drama
Dinah Christie and Tom Kneebone, The Entertainers; Darcy Dunlop, Noel and Gertie; Jane Mortifee, Reflections on Crooked Walking	Len Peterson, Évariste Galois; Silver Donald Cameron, Big Coffin Reel; Linda Zwicker, The Panther and The Jaguar
Best Writing, Radio Public Affairs	Best Writing, Radio Variety
Jay Ingram, Anita Gordon and Penny Park, The World After Nuclear War; Naomi Diamond, The Talmud on Trial; Marian Botsford Fraser, Testament: World Council of Churches	Roger Abbott, Dave Broadfoot, Don Ferguson, Gord Holtam, John Morgan and Rick Olsen, Royal Canadian Air Farce; Tom Kneebone, The Best of Tom and Dinah; J. J. McColl, Griot (Identities)

== Journalism and special awards ==
Gordon Sinclair Award	Foster Hewitt Award
Elizabeth Gray, As It Happens; Peter Gzowski, Morningside; Bob McKeown, The Fifth Estate: "Janise"	Don Cherry; George Young; Dick Irvin
John Drainie Award
Robert Christie
