= Tom Cahill (playwright) =

Canadian playwright

Tom Cahill ONL
- Born: Thomas J. Cahill; 9 October 1929; St. John's, Newfoundland
- Died: August 26, 2006 (aged 77); St. John's, Newfoundland and Labrador, Canada
- Education: Memorial University
- Occupations: Playwright, Producer, Songwriter
- Writing career
- Language: English
- Notable awards: ACTRA, CBC President's Award, Order of Newfoundland and Labrador

Thomas J. Cahill ONL (9 October 1929 – 26 August 2006) was a Canadian playwright, songwriter, and television producer born in St. John's, Newfoundland and Labrador, Canada in 1929. He was well known for his various productions regarding the history of Newfoundland, including TV shows for CBC such as Where Once They Stood and The Undaunted, the latter winning an ACTRA award in 1984, and Tom eventually winning a CBC President's Award for his work.

== Life ==
=== Early life ===
Tom Cahill was born in St. John's in 1929 to Cyril J. Cahill and Mary Fitzpatrick, growing up with five other siblings. His family moved to Placentia when he was four years old and lived in the O'Reilly House, living in Placentia for 6 years before returning to St. John's to attend St. Bonaventure's College. At the age of 14 he attended Loyola College in Montreal before returning to attend Memorial University. He founded the student newspaper The Mews and wrote for the Cap and Gown while also working a summer job for the Newfoundland Railway as a brakeman. He was also a member of the University Naval Training Division HMCS Cabot in which he graduated as Sub-Lieutenant in 1953, the same year in which he graduated from Memorial University with a Bachelor of Arts.

=== CBC ===
Cahill worked in St. John's for a short time after graduation as a reporter for VOCM and with The Evening Telegram. Eventually, when the newspaper The Western Star was established in Corner Brook, he moved and worked as a reporter, columnist and a cartoonist. He ran for the Progressive Conservatives in the 1958 Federal Election for the district of Humber-St. Georges, and in the Provincial General Election the following year, but was unsuccessful both times. He then joined CBC television in Corner Brook in 1959, eventually being transferred to CBC television in St. John's in 1965 to work as a producer for a variety of shows including Where Once They Stood, The Undaunted, Yesterday's Heroes, Yarns From Pigeon Inlet and The Chronicles of Uncle Mose based on folk tales by writer and politician Ted Russell. The Undaunted was an hour-long documentary about the explorer Sir Humphrey Gilbert hosted by Newfoundland journalist Harry Brown and featuring the talents of John Moyes as Gilbert, and Florence Paterson as Elizabeth I. It won an ACTRA award for best television program of 1984, and Cahill won the CBC President's award the same year for "originating and developing quality TV drama production in Newfoundland." He retired from CBC in 1988.

=== Playwright ===
Tom wrote many plays including As Loved Our Fathers about Newfoundland's confederation with Canada, Jody which was about the resettlement program in Newfoundland, and The Only Living Father which is a one man play about Joey Smallwood. Tom returned to Corner Brook a number of years after retiring from CBC and took over as the director of Playmaker's Company, winning the group multiple awards in every Regional Drama Festival over the next 10 years, Cahill winning Best Director 4 times.

=== Songwriting ===
Tom frequently collaborated with late singer Joan Morrissey on songs such as CN Bus and Thank God We're Surrounded by Water.

=== Later life ===
Cahill was awarded the Order of Newfoundland and Labrador in 2005. The dedication noted:

Both provincial and national audiences have heard and seen our local story through the works of Mr. Cahill … He has become known as a renowned cultural figure in the province, with some regarding him a neglected genius. His works are considered to be classics, his dedication to the province he loves is overwhelming, and he is revered by a cultural community who acknowledge the effect he has had on their industry.

Tom Cahill died on August 26, 2006, in a St. John's nursing home.

== Filmography ==
=== As producer ===
- Where Once They Stood (1979)
- Yarns from Pigeon Inlet (1978)
- The Undaunted (1983)
- Yesterday's Heroes (1983)

=== As writer ===
- Yarns from Pigeon Inlet (1978)
- The Undaunted (1983)

=== As director ===
- Where Once They Stood (1978)

== Bibliography ==
=== Plays ===
- The Gallant Major
- Touch of the White Man
- The Only Living Father
- As Loved Our Fathers
- Two More Mrs Hicks and a Hot Dog!
- So Oft It Chances
- Jody
- The Starrigan
- Aunt Martha's Wonderful Sheep
- Salt Herring
- Rough Justice
- Tomorrow Will Be Sunday
- The Last Ride of the Bullet
- Ermyntrude
- Shadow and Substance
- Stoning the Pool
- Their Prayers We Raise
- Beaumont Hamel
- Newfoundland Political and Comedy Monologue Collection
- Newfoundland Political and Comedy Short Play and Skit Collection
- On the Establishment of the Roman Catholic Church in the Colony of Newfoundland, January, 1784
- Down North – A Labrador Doctor
