= Piya Chattopadhyay =

Canadian broadcaster

- Born: Saskatoon, Saskatchewan, Canada
- Spouse: Peter Armstrong
- Children: 3
- Presenting career
- Show: The Sunday Magazine (since 2020), Out in the Open (2016–2020)
- Network: CBC Radio One

Piya Chattopadhyay (/ˈpiːə ˌtʃætəˈpædaɪ/) is a Canadian journalist, currently host of The Sunday Magazine on CBC Radio One.

She is known for her work on CBC Radio, as well as on Fox News Radio, and TVOntario. Prior to launching The Sunday Magazine in 2020, she was the host of Out in the Open and had worked in broadcasting for more than 20 years, as a fill-in anchor and host on TVOntario and the CBC's radio and television networks, including on The Agenda, The Current, Q, The World at Six and Cross-Country Checkup, and previously as Fox News Radio's Middle East correspondent.

In 2010 she won the Gabriel Award for Do No Harm, her documentary about Dr. Izzeldin Abuelaish.

Her weekly CBC Radio series Out in the Open debuted on May 28, 2016, and ran until June 28, 2020.

On June 8, 2020, it was announced that Chattopadhyay would be succeeding Michael Enright as host of CBC Radio's three-hour Sunday morning block of in-depth interviews and documentaries which was called Sunday Edition under Enright's tenure. The new programme, The Sunday Magazine, premiered on September 13, 2020.

== Personal life ==
Chattopadhyay's parents immigrated to Canada from Kolkata, India, in 1967, and she was born and raised in Saskatoon, Saskatchewan. She is married to fellow journalist Peter Armstrong, whom she met while both were working for the CBC, and has a daughter and identical twin sons.
