= Phillip Forsyth =

Canadian newspaper and radio journalist

Phillip Forsyth was a Canadian newspaper and radio journalist, who was co-host of As It Happens, with Harry Brown and William Ronald, from 1968 to 1969. Previous to his hosting As It Happens, he was an editor for the Canadian Press, a staff writer with the Toronto Star and then a freelance broadcast journalist.
