= Here and Now (Toronto) =

CBC Radio One Program

- Genre: talk show
- Running time: 3:00 pm–6:00 pm
- Country of origin: Canada
- Language: English
- Home station: CBLA-FM
- Hosted by: Farrah Merali
- Recording studio: Toronto, Ontario

Here and Now is a daily Canadian radio show, which airs on CBLA-FM in Toronto, Ontario.

Under CBC Radio One's policy of extended local programming in metropolitan markets, the program airs from 3 p.m. to 6 p.m. on CBLA's primary transmitter in Toronto, pre-empting the 3 p.m. to 4 p.m. hour of network programming. However, CBLA's rebroadcast transmitters elsewhere in Southern Ontario do not air the first hour of Here and Now, remaining with the network programs and joining Here and Now in progress at 4 p.m.

== History ==
The program debuted under its current title in 1997, concurrently with the network's rebranding from "CBC Radio" to "CBC Radio One". Its first host was slated to be Maureen Taylor, but she left the network for TVOntario before the program's launch, and the program debuted with Joan Melanson as host. Melanson took a maternity leave in 1998, and Erika Ritter took over the program as a guest host.

The program was hosted by Avril Benoît from 1999 to 2004 and by Matt Galloway from 2004 until February 8, 2010; Galloway moved to hosting Metro Morning effective March 1, 2010. From February 2010 through December 2010, interim hosts included Robin Brown, Jane Hawtin, Karen Horsman, and Kevin Sylvester.

On December 16, 2010, broadcaster Laura Di Battista was announced as the new host starting January 3, 2011. Her tenure lasted until November 2012, when CBC spokesperson Chuck Thompson announced that Battista was out. At the time, no successor was made public; in the interim, Brown, Hawtin, Horsman, Sylvester, Gill Deacon and Mary Ito served as guest hosts. On May 31, 2013, the CBC announced Deacon as the new permanent host, starting September 2, 2013. Deacon spent a year away from the show beginning in fall 2018 after being diagnosed with breast cancer; the show was guest-hosted through much of 2019 by Reshmi Nair, Saroja Coelho, Nana aba Duncan or Angeline Tetteh-Wayoe, and Deacon returned to the show in early September 2019. She stepped away from the show again in December 2022 due to long COVID, with guest hosts filling in until Deacon announced in September 2024 that she was stepping away from the program permanently.

Ramraajh Sharvendiran, the last guest host before Deacon announced her departure, was previously the host of North Country on CBWK-FM in Thompson from 2018 to 2020, the St. John's Morning Show on CBN in St. John's from 2020 to 2022, and Ontario Morning on non-metropolitan transmitters in Southern Ontario from 2022 to 2024. He remained the host of Here and Now until October 2025, when he returned to Ontario Morning and was succeeded as host of Here and Now by Farrah Merali.

Personalities associated with the show include Trevor Dunn with local news reports, Colette Kennedy covering weather and Khalil Hassanali with traffic updates.

== Hosts ==
- Joan Melanson (1997 – 1998)
- Erika Ritter (1998 – 1999)
- Avril Benoit (1999 – 2004)
- Matt Galloway (March 1, 2004 – December 6, 2010)
- guest hosts (December 7, 2010 - December 31, 2010)
- Laura Di Battista (January 3, 2011 – November 1, 2012)
- Gill Deacon (September 2, 2013 – September 4, 2024)
- guest hosts (Fall 2018 - September 2019)
- Ramraajh Sharvendiran (April 15, 2024 – October 10, 2025)
- Farrah Merali (October 14, 2025 – present)

== See also ==
- CBC Radio One local programming
