= Talking Books (Canadian radio program) =

Radio program

Talking Books was a Canadian radio program, which aired on CBC Radio One. Hosted by Ian Brown, the program was a discussion on books and literature. It was the only books show on CBC Radio that had critical discussions of books, as well as identifying trends, in writing. The program was cancelled in 2008, in order to find a place for The Next Chapter, hosted by Shelagh Rogers.
