= Human Edge =

Canadian television series

Human Edge was a Canadian television series, which premiered on TVOntario in 1989. The program presented international documentary films on social issues.

The series was hosted in its first season by Michael Ignatieff. He was succeeded by Mary Lou Finlay in the second season, by Catherine Olsen in the third and fourth seasons, and by Ian Brown in the fifth season; Brown hosted for the remainder of the show's run.
