= O'Reilly House (Placentia) =

House in Canada

O'Reilly House Museum
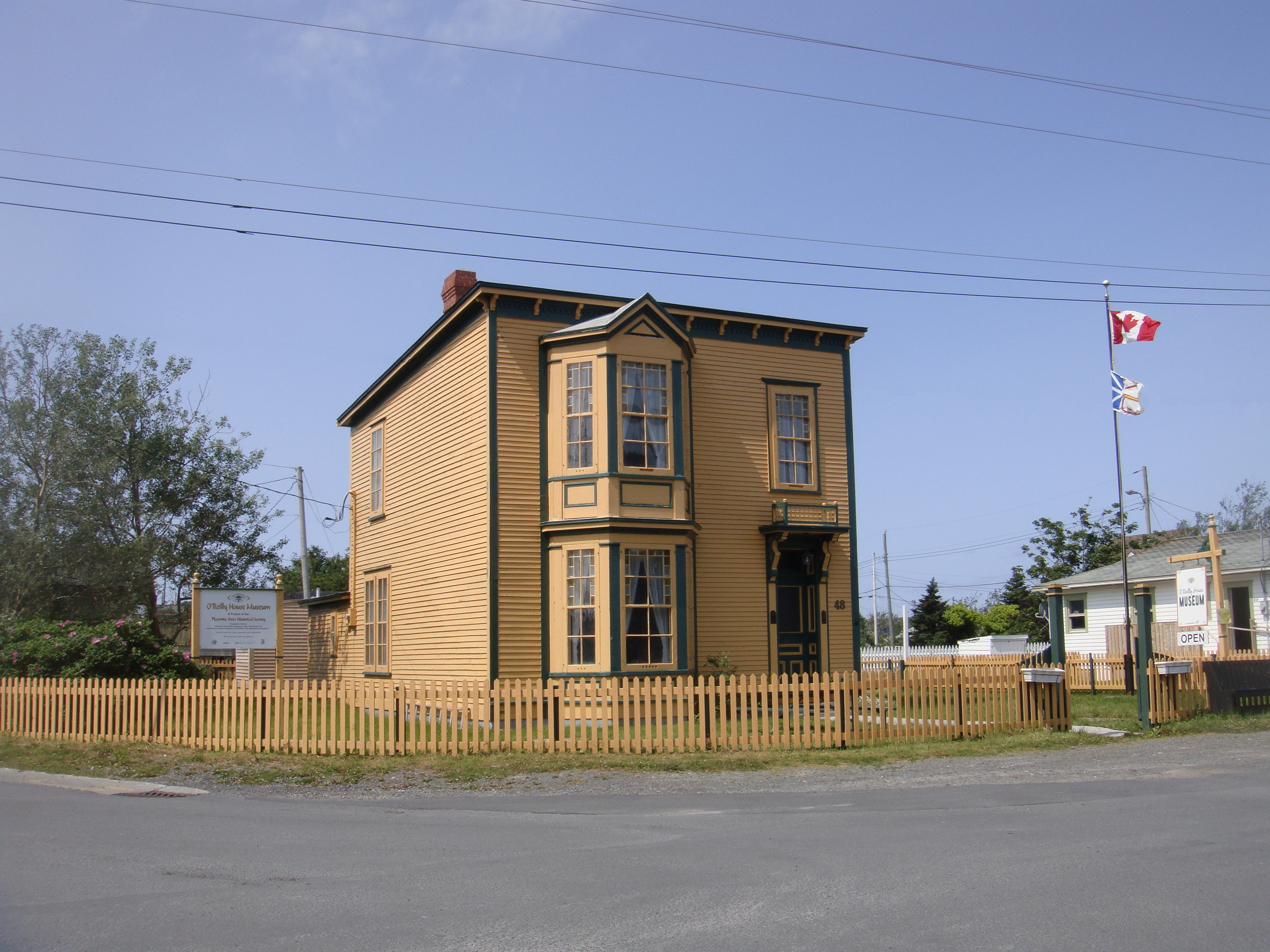
- 2014 photo
- Established: 1984
- Location: Placentia, Newfoundland and Labrador, Canada
- Coordinates: 47°14′45″N 53°57′40″W
- Type: History Museum
- Collections: Resettlement, Basques, New France, World War II
- Website: Placentia History

O'Reilly House (also known as the O'Reilly House Museum) is a museum located in Placentia, Newfoundland and Labrador, Canada. It was built for Magistrate William O'Reilly who served as Magistrate of Placentia from 1897-1923. He was the son of Thomas O'Reilly who had been the magistrate of Placentia from 1877-97. In 1902, Magistrate O’Reilly employed the architect W.J. Ellis to build a Balustrade Queen Anne Victorian house that would serve as his family home.

== Description ==
Consisting of two storeys, the exterior of this Victorian bracketed house is defined by narrow wooden clapboard. Alongside this feature, the house contains several design elements that reflect the typical style of Victorian houses. Accordingly, an entablature was placed above the front door and in the entrance-way, the architect added decorative stained glass windows which were placed alongside the interior door of the foyer. Double-bay windows with pediment also highlight the front of the house.

Inside the house, the rooms on the ground floor are typical of Victorian decorative arts with a parlour and dining room near the front of the house and a kitchen and pantry in the rear. Leading out of the kitchen is a narrow and modest stairway that led to a room that would have been reserved for the maid who worked in the house.

The parlour also contains several attributes including "very large double bay windows, dentil mouldings, pocket doors, roundels, stained glass windows, four fireplaces, large handcrafted mouldings throughout and a handcrafted staircase."

The main stairway is defined by unique details. Close to the top floor, one of the wooden railings is inverted. Whether this detail was intentional or unintentional is unknown. However, it remains one of the original elements of the house. The various rooms in the house were warmed by fireplaces. On the ground floor, there is a fireplace in the parlour, as well as another in the dining room. Two of the rooms on the second floor each possess a fireplace.

== House of the Magistrate ==
Magistrate William O'Reilly stepped down in 1923 and was followed by Michael Sinnott. At the time, the O'Reilly family continued to live in the O'Reilly House until the death of William O’Reilly in 1928. Afterwards, beginning around 1934-1935, the O'Reilly House was rented to the Cahill family for a short period of time for parents Cyril and Mary. Their son Tom Cahill grew up to become a playwright and writer for CBC Television. He wrote many plays about Newfoundland winning an ACTRA award for The Undaunted: Sir Humphrey Gilbert about explorer Humphrey Gilbert, and a CBC President’s Award for his work. Artifacts belonging to him and his various awards were donated by his family to the historical society, and are now on display in the museum.

When William Linegar became the Magistrate in 1939, after Michael Sinnott stepped down, he privately leased the O'Reilly House as accommodation for himself and his family. It was several years later in 1943, when the Government of Newfoundland (Department of Justice) purchased the house in order for it to be used as the official residence for the magistrates.

William Linegar remained as Magistrate until 1972 and was followed by Magistrate Terrence Corbett who did not reside in the house. Although William Linegar was no longer the magistrate, he continued to occupy the O'Reilly House until his death in 1984.

== Renovations ==
In 1985, the O’Reilly House became vacant and the Placentia Area Historical Society was able to purchase it for a dollar from the Newfoundland and Labrador Housing Corporation. For the most part, the house was used as the magistrate's house. Amongst the older houses in Placentia, Newfoundland, "it is one of the few that have not been 'modernized.'" Many of the features of the original house remained intact. However, after successfully obtaining a number of grants to fund the renovations, the PAHS began its work.

The renovations were substantial and involved tasks such as removing paint that had been in place for several decades. Some of the elements of the house had to be replaced such as the ceiling in the dining room, as well as the fireplace. Despite these renovations, the goal was to maintain the original design features of the house.

The Placentia Area Historical Society received the Southcott Award in 1989 from the Newfoundland Historic Trust in recognition of the preservation of the house. It was also designated as a Registered Heritage Structure of Newfoundland and Labrador in 2000, and was the third structure to receive this status in Placentia, the other two being the Rosedale Manor and St. Luke's Cultural Heritage Centre.

Additional repairs were completed in 1999. This work was focused on the roof, chimneys, siding, and doors. On 24 April of that year, the building was designated a Registered Heritage Structure by the Heritage Foundation of Newfoundland and Labrador.

The O’Reilly House was designated a Municipal Heritage Building on 19 August 2006 by the Town of Placentia.

== Museum ==
Following the renovations, the Placentia Area Historical Society officially opened the house as the O’Reilly House Museum on 1 June 1989. Since this time, the O’Reilly House Museum has become a noted tourist attraction for visitors to the Placentia area in Newfoundland and Labrador. In 2020, the historical society acquired the recently deconsecrated and historic St. Luke's Anglican Church located next-door, and have renovated it into St. Luke's Cultural Heritage Centre, now used for lectures, workshops, performances, and even an escape room inside the building.

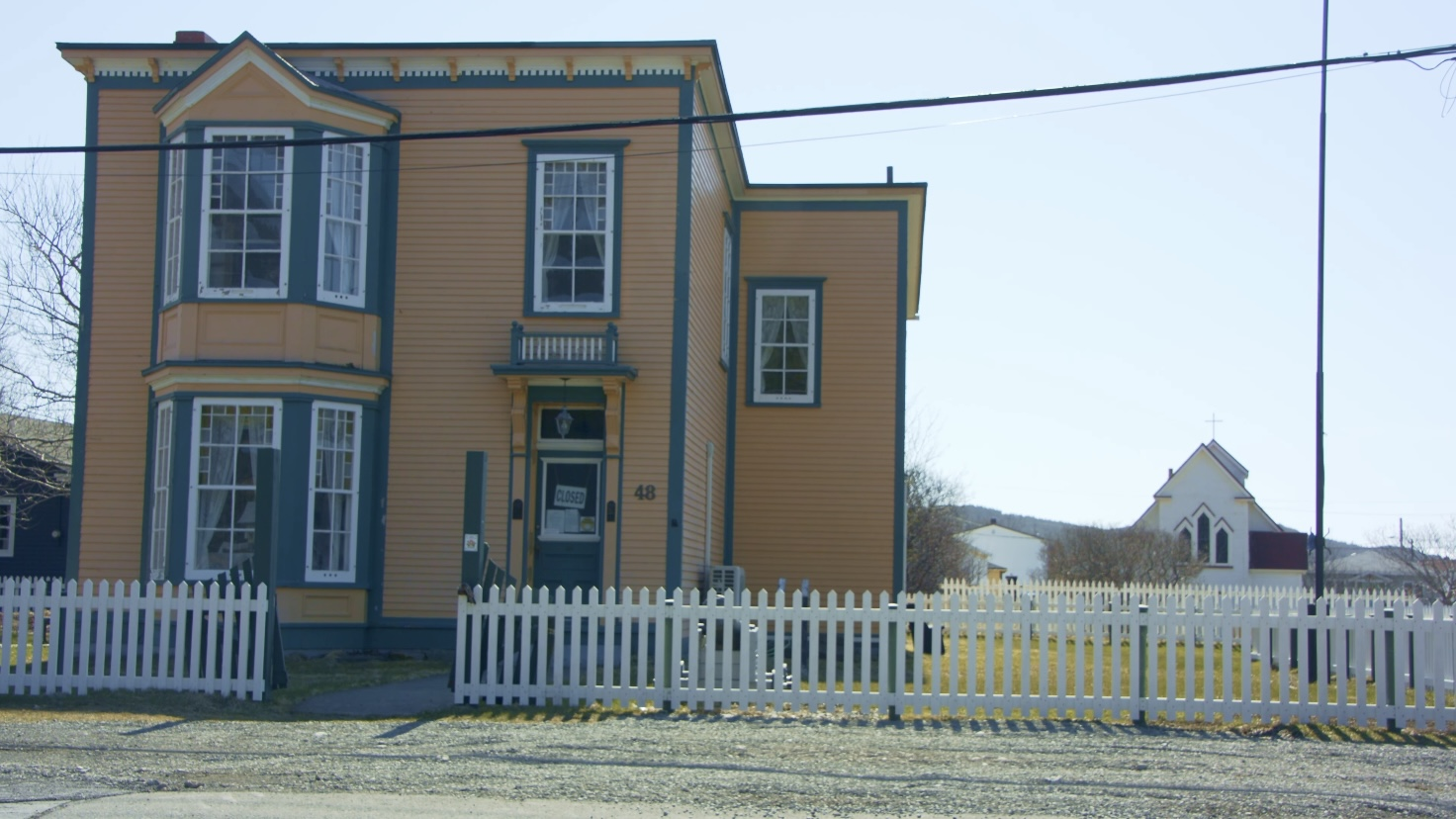
The O'Reilly House with St. Luke's Cultural Heritage Centre in the background.

In 2020 due to the COVID-19 pandemic, the museum opted to help create a virtual tour of the museum using 360° photos of each space. Visitors of the website can view each of the interior rooms, and learn more about each artifact and picture inside the museum.

== See also ==
- St. Luke's Cultural Heritage Centre
- Castle Hill, Newfoundland and Labrador

== Sources ==
- Anonymous 1988 "Preserving a piece of Placentia" Decks Awash 17(3), pp. 27-28
- Canada’s Historic Places 2014 "O'Reilly House Municipal Heritage Building", historicplaces.ca; accessed 21 January 2018.
- Barnable, G. 2002 Under the Clock — A Legal History of the Ancient Capital (St. John’s, NL: The Law Society of Newfoundland and Labrador); accessed 21 January 2018.
- Newfoundland and Labrador Heritage Web Site 2014 "O'Reilly House", heritage.nf.ca; accessed 21 January 2018.
- "O'Reilly House Museum", Virtual Museums in Canada 2013; accessed 21 January 2018.
