= Out in the Open (radio show) =

- Genre: Talk radio
- Running time: 1 hour
- Country of origin: Canada
- Language(s): English
- Home station: CBC Radio One
- Syndicates: Public Radio International; Public Radio Exchange
- Hosted by: Piya Chattopadhyay
- Original release: May 28, 2016 – June 28, 2020
- Website: CBC.ca/OutInTheOpen

Out in the Open was a weekly Canadian current affairs radio program hosted by Piya Chattopadhyay on CBC Radio One. The show debuted on May 28, 2016, and was syndicated to public radio stations in the United States through Public Radio International/Public Radio Exchange. Its final episode aired on June 28, 2020.

The mandate of Out in the Open was to "peel back the layers of one big issue," with each episode devoted to a single contemporary topic. Diverse points of view were featured, including interviews, debates, field documentaries and listener contributions. Early episodes addressed topics such as oversharing (the topic for the first episode), the legalization of marijuana, belonging and identity, and sharing secrets online.

Each Out in the Open episode was promoted in advance by a podcast, released 10 days in advance of the broadcast, that teased the episode's subject and invited listeners to submit their own stories, comments, and opinions related to the topic. Listeners could submit their audio contributions via a toll-free phone line, e-mail, or Facebook Messenger, as well as through Twitter and Facebook.

The show's final episode aired on June 28, 2020. Chattopadhyay will host a new three-hour radio show on Sundays starting September 6, 2020, to replace The Sunday Edition.
