= The Next Chapter (radio program) =

Weekly Canadian radio program

- Genre: talk show
- Country of origin: Canada
- Home station: CBC Radio One
- Hosted by: Antonio Michael Downing
- Recording studio: Toronto, Ontario
- Original release: 2008

The Next Chapter is a Canadian radio program, which airs on CBC Radio One. The program is an hour-long weekly magazine show on books and literature, including interviews with writers.

The program was launched in 2008, replacing Ian Brown's similar show Talking Books.

The show was hosted by Shelagh Rogers from its premiere until 2023. In May 2023, Rogers announced her retirement from the program, effective June 24. The show was guest hosted by Ryan B. Patrick through the summer, and Ali Hassan in the 2023–24 season, until Antonio Michael Downing was announced as the new host in September 2024. The summer season in 2024 was hosted by Christa Couture.
