= This Morning =

This Morning may refer to:

- This Morning (TV programme), a British daytime television programme
- This Morning (radio program), a Canadian radio show which aired from 1997 to 2002
- CBS This Morning, an American morning show, successor and predecessor to The Early Show
- CNN This Morning, an American morning show
- "This Morning", a song by The Cure from The Cure
- "This Morning", a song by Irish band Picture This

== See also ==
- This Morning with Richard Not Judy, a British comedy television programme
