= Cyril J. Cahill =

Newfoundland politician (1883–1971)

Cyril J. Cahill MHA
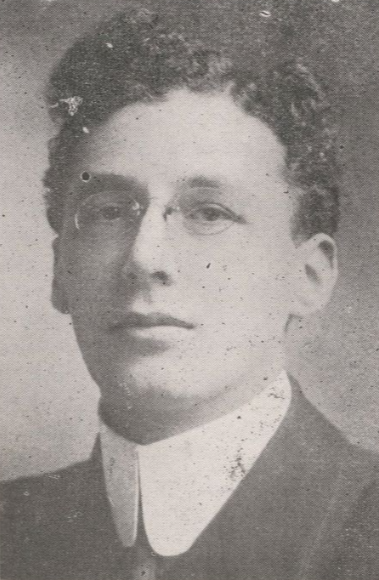
- Cahill in 1930

Member of the Newfoundland House of Assembly for Harbour Main
- In office June 2, 1924 – October 29, 1928 Serving with William Woodford
- Preceded by: Matthew E. Hawco
- Succeeded by: Philip J. Lewis; Albert Walsh

Personal details
- Born: February 22, 1883 St. Pierre and Miquelon, France
- Died: August 14, 1971 (aged 88) Placentia, Newfoundland, Canada
- Party: Liberal-Conservative Progressive
- Spouse: Mary Fitzpatrick (m. 1912)
- Children: 7, including Tom
- Education: Saint Bonaventure's College
- Occupation: Lawyer, insurance agent

Cyril Joseph Cahill (February 22, 1883 – August 14, 1971) was a Newfoundlander and Canadian lawyer and politician. As a Liberal-Conservative Progressive supporter of Prime Minister Walter S. Monroe, he represented Harbour Main in the Newfoundland House of Assembly from 1924 to 1928.

== Legal and political career ==
The son of Patrick Cahill and Bridget Burke, he was born in the French territory of St. Pierre and was educated at Saint Bonaventure's College in St. John's. He articled with Frank Lilly, was called to the Newfoundland bar in 1908 and set up practice in St. John's. Cahill was an agent for Fidelity (Fire) Underwriters of New York and Newfoundland manager for the Crown Life Insurance Company of Canada. From 1921 to 1924, Cahill was Newfoundland state deputy for the Knights of Columbus. He was elected to the Newfoundland assembly in 1924. The Cahill family moved to Placentia in 1933, living briefly inside the O'Reilly House.

== Family ==
In 1912, Cahill married Mary Fitzpatrick. His son Tom became a playwright, television producer, and screenwriter.
