= This Morning (radio program) =

Canadian radio program

- Genre: talk show
- Country of origin: Canada
- Home station: CBC Radio One
- Hosted by: Michael Enright (1997–2000); Avril Benoit (1997–1999); Shelagh Rogers (2000–2002)
- Recording studio: Toronto, Ontario
- Original release: 1997 – 2002

This Morning was a Canadian radio program which aired from 1997 to 2002 on CBC Radio One. It was not always successful with CBC audiences, and underwent several format and hosting changes during its lifetime.

The program was devised as a replacement for Morningside following Peter Gzowski's retirement from the network. It aired weekday and Sunday mornings from 9 a.m. to noon, also replacing Ian Brown's Sunday Morning. The program was hosted in its first two years by Michael Enright and Avril Benoit.

The program was generally perceived by critics as an expanded Sunday Morning rather than a successor to Morningside. Listener reaction to Benoit was particularly polarized, with Benoit herself noting that "I've been accused of being dour, earnest, biased, distant, cool and flippant, all in the same package of letters."

Enright became the show's sole host in 1999, and Benoit moved on to CBC Radio's local afternoon program in Toronto, Here and Now. In 2000, the CBC discontinued the six-day format. The Sunday broadcast once again became a separate program hosted by Enright, The Sunday Edition, and Shelagh Rogers became the weekday host of This Morning.

Following the September 11 attacks on the World Trade Centre in New York City, the program faced some criticism for the flaws its format revealed in CBC Radio's ability to respond to a breaking news story. Because the program had been prerecorded for its Atlantic Time Zone airing, and was airing in tape delay in the Eastern Time Zone while all of the stations in Western Canada were still airing their local morning shows, the network had no viable way to interrupt programming in advance of its regular news break, and thus opted to wait until 10 a.m. EST to begin its coverage of the attacks.

In part as a response to the criticism, the program was cancelled in 2002 and split into two new morning programs, The Current for hard news and Sounds Like Canada for human interest and documentary features. Anna Maria Tremonti became host of The Current, while Rogers remained as host of Sounds Like Canada.

== Note ==
CBC Radio carried a daily morning radio program under the This Morning name during 1976, shortly before the debut of Morningside.
