= Mary Ito =

Canadian television and radio personality

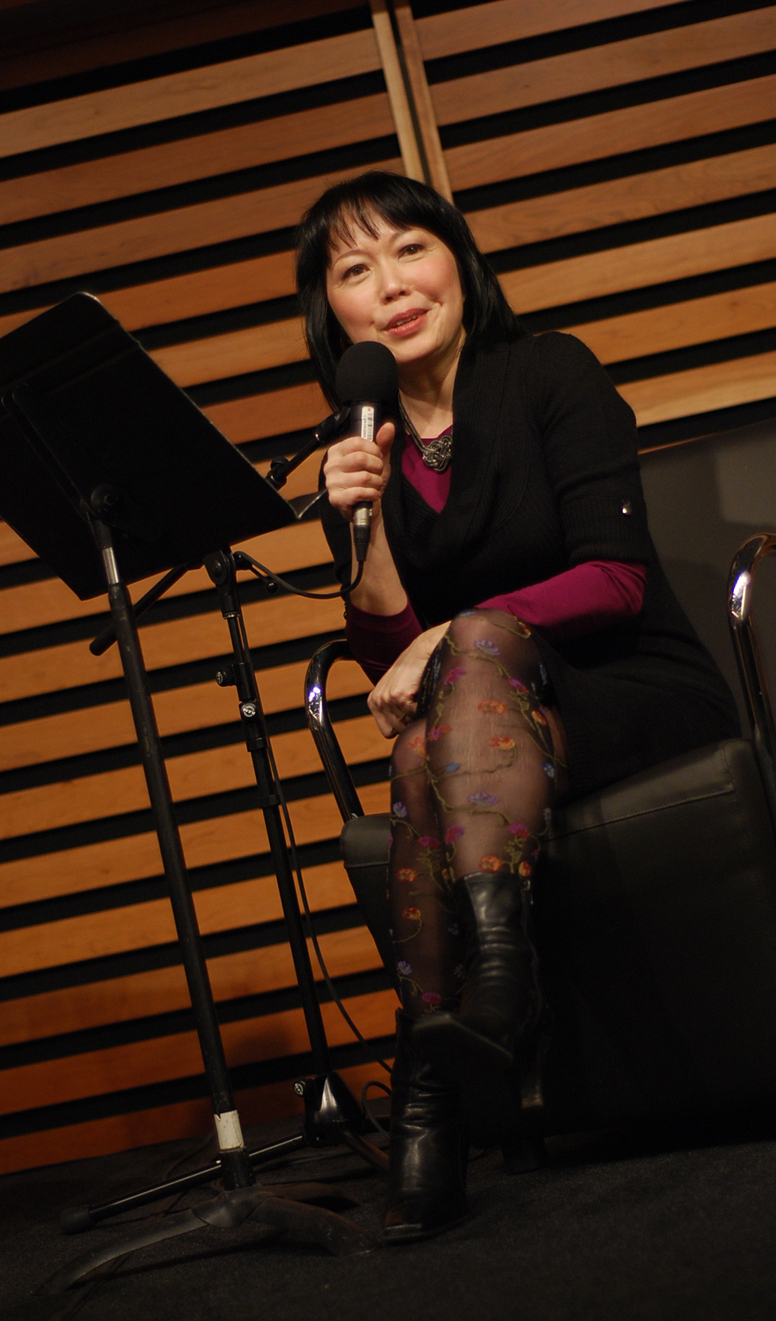
- Ito in 2010
- Born: December 24, 1960 (age 65)
- Education: Runnymede Collegiate; University of Toronto
- Occupation: Broadcaster
- Spouse: Carlo Ammendolia

Mary Ito is a Canadian television and radio personality who formerly hosted Fresh Air, CBC Radio One's regional weekend program in Ontario.

== Media career ==
While studying English at the University of Toronto, Ito became involved in the campus media outlets of The Varsity and what later became CIUT-FM. Her first published work was a review panning the 1980 film Just Tell Me What You Want.

After graduation in 1981, she later attended Ryerson Polytechnical Institute's Radio and Television program for one year, before being offered a full-time position at CFRB. After CFRB, she became a reporter and weekend anchor for CFTO-TV and then moved to become a reporter at Global. She then hosted TVOntario's More to Life and Second Opinion, before becoming the host of CBC Television's Living in Toronto.

== Personal life ==
Ito lives in Toronto with her husband, Dr Carlo Ammendolia, and they have two sons and a daughter.
