= The Undaunted (TV series) =

1983 Canadian historical television series

- Genre: Docudrama
- Written by: Tom Cahill
- Presented by: Harry Brown
- Country of origin: Canada
- Original language: English

Production
- Producer: Tom Cahill
- Cinematography: Eric Krichbaum
- Production company: CBNT-DT

Original release
- Network: CBC Television
- Release: 1983 – 1984

The Undaunted is a Canadian docudrama television series that aired on CBC Television in 1983. The series dramatized several key figures in Canadian history, including episodes on Humphrey Gilbert's role in the founding of Newfoundland; the establishment of the Red River Colony by Thomas Douglas, 5th Earl of Selkirk; the destruction and reconstruction of the Fortress of Louisbourg; and the explorations of Alexander Mackenzie. The series was hosted by Canadian radio and television host Harry Brown, and written and produced by well known Newfoundland playwright Tom Cahill.

The episode on Humphrey Gilbert won the ACTRA Award for Best Television Program at the 13th ACTRA Awards in 1984.

== See also ==
- Where Once They Stood
