= Morningside (radio program) =

Morningside is a nationally broadcast Canadian radio program that aired on CBC Radio from September 20, 1976 to May 30, 1997. It was broadcast from 9 a.m. to noon, Monday to Friday. The series replaced a series of short-lived morning radio programs that aired in this slot after This Country in the Morning ended in 1974.

The show was created by Krista Mäeots who served as its executive producer until her death in 1978. She had formerly been a producer with This Country in the Morning. The show debuted with Harry Brown and Maxine Crook as co-hosts. In September 1977, Don Harron became host of the show. But the program was most associated with legendary Canadian broadcaster Peter Gzowski, who assumed the host's chair in 1982. The program was a mixture of news and human interest interviews. Shelagh Rogers and Stuart McLean were frequent guest hosts in later years.

In 1993, following the cancellation of CBC's Prime Time, Morningside added a prime time edition which replayed selected segments from that morning's broadcast.

Morningside has proven to be one of the most successful radio programs in CBC history. Among the regular contributors was producer and comedian Stuart McLean, who also had a summer time segment on the show called The Vinyl Cafe, which eventually was spun-off to become a regular separate program on CBC Radio for decades.

When Gzowski retired in 1997, Morningside and the network's Sunday public affairs show Sunday Morning were replaced by This Morning, which was hosted in its first year by Michael Enright and Avril Benoit.

Gzowski hosted the last episode of Morningside from the Temple Gardens Mineral Spa Resort in Moose Jaw.

== Theme music ==
During Harron's tenure, the opening theme was "Jogging Along" by John Arpin. "Blue Skies" composed by Irving Berlin was used as the closing theme. The theme for Gzowski's tenure was "Morningside theme" composed by David W. Thompson. The closing theme was "Happiness" by Sandro Carlo Camerin (Reel to Reel).
