= Take 30 =

Canadian television program (1962–1984)

- Also known as: Take 60 (1973–74)
- Presented by: Anna Cameron; Paul Soles; Adrienne Clarkson; Mary Lou Finlay; Hana Gartner; Harry Brown; Nadine Berger
- Country of origin: Canada
- No. of seasons: 22

Production
- Running time: 30-35 minutes

Original release
- Network: CBC Television
- Release: September 17, 1962 – 1984

Take 30 (also expressed as Take Thirty) is a Canadian television newsmagazine program that aired on CBC Television from 1962 to 1984 for 2,500 episodes. An afternoon program originally designed as a "women's show", it gradually evolved into a showcase for serious journalism, airing documentary reports and interviews on social and cultural topics.

Despite the title, the program at times aired in a 35-minute time slot, as was the case in late 1965.

The program's original hosts were Anna Cameron and Paul Soles. In 1965, Cameron left and was replaced by Adrienne Clarkson. During his time on the show, Soles was also a busy voiceover actor for animation, best known for shows such as Rudolph the Red-Nosed Reindeer and Spider-Man, both of which were produced concurrent with his work on Take 30; he was also a regular on the comedic game show This is the Law during this time.

Clarkson left the show in 1975 to become a host of The Fifth Estate, and was replaced by Mary Lou Finlay. Finlay left in 1977, and was replaced by Hana Gartner; Soles left the following year and was replaced by Harry Brown. Gartner left in 1982 and was replaced in the show's final season by Nadine Berger.

Other contributors to the show included Jehane Benoît, Brigitte Berman, Rita Deverell, Charles Lynch, John Yesno and Moses Znaimer.

In some years, the CBC summer schedule repeated episodes from the past season, supplemented by shows produced in cities outside Toronto, titled in the 30 From ... format, such as 30 From Vancouver.
