= Rosedale Manor Bed and Breakfast Boutique =

Bed and breakfast in Placentia, Newfoundland, Canada

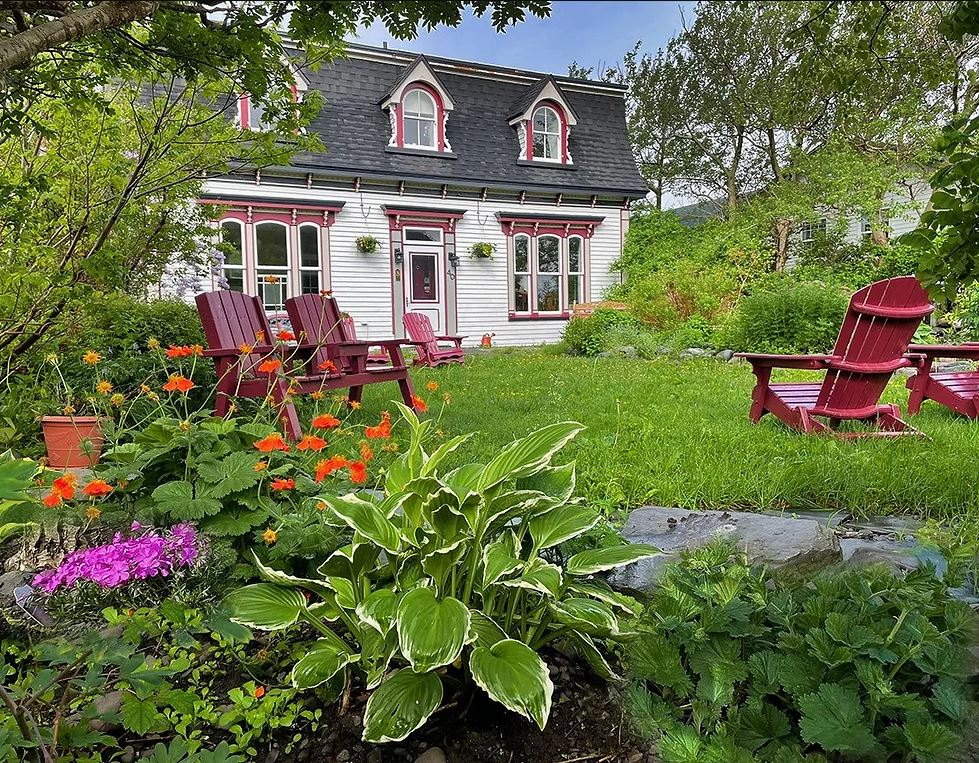
- Rosedale Manor, located in Placentia, Newfoundland.
- Interactive map of the Rosedale Manor Bed and Breakfast Boutique area
- Former names: Verran House
- Alternative names: Rosedale Manor

General information
- Type: Second Empire style
- Architectural style: Mansard style heritage home
- Location: Placentia, Newfoundland and Labrador, Canada, 40 Orcan Drive
- Coordinates: 47°14′45″N 53°57′40″W
- Completed: c. 1893
- Renovated: 1989
- Owner: Christopher Newhook, Lori Pretty

Technical details
- Floor count: 2

Design and construction
- Awards: 2022 Wild Rose Recognition Award, Southcott 2019

Other information
- Number of rooms: 4 Bedrooms

Website
- rosedalemanor.ca

Rosedale Manor Bed and Breakfast (commonly known as Rosedale Manor) is a bed and breakfast located in Placentia, Newfoundland and Labrador, Canada. Built in 1893, it is a top historical tourist destination in the Placentia area.

== History ==
Harry Verran was a mining engineer from Cornwall, England who came to Newfoundland in 1857 to work for the American entrepreneur Cyrus Field. Field helped prepare the first telegraph cable across the Atlantic Ocean, and hired Henry to operate the telegraph machine for the American Telegraph Company situated in Placentia. He built the house in 1893, and married Mary Sweetman, a descendant of the popular Saunders and Sweetman firm local to Placentia. The house was owned by Verran family until 1972 before it was sold to the town of Placentia. It was bought and renovated in 1989, saving it from demolition, and then opened to the public as Rosedale Manor B&B. The old roses in the garden come from soil transported as ballast in a ship from Ireland.

== Description ==
The house has four bedrooms, all with period decor, antique furniture, and co-owner Christopher Newhook's original artwork. There is a common living room area, a dining room, an English-style flower garden and a koi fish pond. The house incorporates a second empire style of architecture, which was very common in Newfoundland after the great fire of St. John's in 1892. Its distinguishing features are highly decorated hooded dormer windows, ground floor bay windows and door openings with a mansard roof.

== Recognition ==
Due to the rich history of the site and building, it was designated as a Registered Heritage Structure of Newfoundland and Labrador in 2000. It was one of three structures to receive this status in Placentia, the other two being the St. Luke's Cultural Heritage Centre and the O'Reilly House Museum.

The Rosedale Manor was one of the recipients of the 2022 Wild Rose Recognition Award given by the Town of Placentia. The award honours those who have contributed to beautification, maintenance and gardening projects on private property or public spaces, community clean up or environmental projects.
