= John Yesno =

Ojibwe Canadian actor, broadcaster, Indigenous advocate

Obediah (Johnny) Yesno
- Born: 1938; Eabametoong First Nation (Fort Hope, Ontario), Canada
- Died: March 20, 2010 (aged 71); Sault Ste. Marie, Ontario, Canada
- Known for: King of the Grizzlies; "Our Native Land"

Obediah (Johnny) Yesno (1938 – March 20, 2010), CM, was a Canadian actor, dancer, broadcaster, journalist, and Indigenous advocate, of Ojibwe Indigenous heritage. His most notable acting role was starring in the Disney film King of the Grizzlies. He also acted on stage, in television, and was a radio broadcaster. He was the host and producer of a CBC Radio program about Indigenous affairs known as "Our Native Land". He later served as a civil servant working on Indigenous issues.

== Early life ==
The eldest of 11 children, Yesno was born at Eabametoong First Nation (Fort Hope) in Ontario. He attended the Pelican residential school just outside of Sioux Lookout, Ontario, beginning at age five. He rebelled at the abuse and ran away from the school at age nine in winter. He was found and returned to the school, but after intervention by his father, was transferred to the Shingwauk school in Sault Ste Marie, Ontario. He thrived at the school, was awarded a post-secondary scholarship and moved on to attend the University of Waterloo, studying engineering. His father was John C. Yesno. According to Yesno, an ancestor was a negotiator for the Ojibwe in treaty negotiations. He attributes the unusual last name to the ancestor, who replied to various treaty negotiation proposals saying either "yes" or "no". Only leaving his mark on the treaty, his last name became "Yesno" to the Canadian negotiators.

== Career ==
After graduation, Yesno moved to Toronto in 1960, married and became a father and was employed by an engineering firm, while performing occasionally with a dance group that performed for tourists. In 1963, he won the North American Indian Dancing Championship. By chance, he was spotted by a television producer at a dance group performance and was recruited for the "Wojeck" television series by the CBC's Eva Langbord. He was convinced by friends to audition for the role, who had been entertained by Yesno socially. Although it was his first acting role, his portrayal of an Indigenous man who commits suicide in jail in the premiere episode won him an acting award. He studied under the Toronto Workshop Productions theatre troupe and found acting work in film and television.

In 1967, Yesno took on the role of host and producer of the CBC's "Indian Magazine", later known as "Our Native Land", which presented the views of Indigenous Canadians weekly. However, he was critical of the CBC's portrayal of Indigenous persons: "the CBC is always doing programs on Indians, but some of the producers wouldn't know an Indian if they met one." CBC television programs "always use the old shack door falling off its hinges. I'd swear they get it from the set decoration rooms." On his show, "we raise a few storms of our own on the program", "we expose bad situations when we find them, and also inform Indians what rights they have and what resources are open to them." According to Yesno, unlike previous programs focused on Indigenous people, it was "all-red, all-the-time." As well, Yesno was a journalist on the "Take 30" CBC television program.

In 1972, Yesno produced and hosted a week-long festival of Indigenous arts and culture at Toronto's Ontario Place. He also demonstrated Ojibwe folk dances at the Royal Ontario Museum at a festival organized by the Mariposa Folk Festival.

In 1975, Yesno acted in Cold Journey, a film about a young boy who runs away from residential school and is found frozen to death, similar to the 1966 real-life story of Charlie Wenjack. The film was produced by Canada's National Film Board.

In 1977, Yesno was master of ceremonies at the opening of Rankin Arena. He hoped that the arena would "bring both communities together at a crucial time when we seem to be splitting into different ethnic and social entities". He wanted to express what Indigenous peoples wanted: "to promote the acceptance of our unique background, he says. We aren't looking for integration. We are concerned with understanding and sharing."

His acting career declined by the 1980s and he returned to Northern Ontario, working as a civil servant, working for the Chiefs of Ontario and the Government of Ontario, until his retirement in 2002. He died in 2010 at the age of 71 in Sault Ste Marie. He was survived by his partner Rosemary King, his daughter Wanda, six grand-children and ten great-grandchildren.

Yesno was awarded the Order of Canada in 1976. For "Our Native Land", Yesno was nominated for an ACTRA Award in 1973 for best public broadcaster. Yesno was praised by Nishnawbe Aski Nation Grand Chief Stan Beardy, who stated "Yesno blazed a lot of trails for us" and he "educated society at a time when the Lone Ranger and Tonto was on television, about not stereotyping First Nation people.".

== Filmography ==
=== Film ===
- King of the Grizzlies (1970)
- The Inbreaker (1974)
- Cold Journey (1975)
- The Man, the Snake and the Fox (1979) (short)

=== Television ===
- Wojeck (1966)
- Celebrity Cooks (1975)
- Take 30
- Matt and Jenny (1980)
- The Courage of Kavik, the Wolf Dog (1980) (tv movie)
