= Live It Up! (TV program) =

Canadian lifestyle newsmagazine

- Presented by: Jack McGaw; Alan Edmonds; Mary Lou Finlay; Liz Grogan; Dianne Buckner; Sharon Seto
- Country of origin: Canada

Original release
- Network: CTV
- Release: 1978 – 1990

Live It Up! is a Canadian lifestyle, entertainment and consumer awareness television program that aired nationally on CTV from 1978 to 1990. Reruns of the show aired on talktv until January 2005.

The program's hosts included Jack McGaw, Alan Edmonds, Mary Lou Finlay, Liz Grogan, Dianne Buckner and Sharon Seto. Live It Up! featured a mix of serious consumer-affairs topics and lighter consumer topics, mostly delivered in a tongue-in-cheek style. Segments were mainly filmed at first, but moved permanently to videotape in 1987.

Regular segments included the Watchdog (played by Ron Carlyle, a man whose face is never shown while testing different brands of a product), "What bugs you?" (concerned consumers talk about problems with household products, and those involved in those products explain why those problems occur and/or mentions how they are improving them; segments began and end with a person (Miss Judy) in a bug costume flying around, saying "What bugs you?" in a high-pitched voice), "The Legal Beagle" with lawyer, Jonathan Rudin explaining unusual Canadian laws in humorous sketches performed by the Live It Up Players (notably Tracie Tighe and Art Szoczi) and "The Great Canadian Joke-Off", a nationwide search to find the funniest joke in Canada, with each segment ending with an annoyed monkey.
