= Where Once They Stood =

1979 Canadian historical television series

- Genre: History
- Directed by: Tom Cahill
- Presented by: Harry Brown
- Country of origin: Canada
- Original language: English
- No. of seasons: 1

Production
- Producer: Tom Cahill
- Cinematography: Eric Krichbaum
- Editor: Jack White
- Running time: 30 minutes
- Production company: CBNT-DT

Original release
- Network: CBC Television
- Release: 7 April – 2 June 1979

Where Once They Stood is a Canadian historical television series that aired on CBC Television in 1979.

== Premise ==
This St. John's-produced series concerned the origins of Canada's settlements.

== Scheduling ==
This series was broadcast Saturdays at 11:00 a.m. (Eastern time) from 7 April to 2 June 1979.

== See also ==
- The Undaunted
