= The Sunday Magazine (radio program) =

Canadian news & current affairs radio show

- Genre: news magazine/talk show
- Country of origin: Canada
- Home station: CBC Radio
- Hosted by: Piya Chattopadhyay
- Recording studio: Toronto, Ontario
- Original release: September 13, 2020

The Sunday Magazine is a Canadian news and current affairs radio show, hosted by Piya Chattopadhyay on CBC Radio One. The program premiered on September 13, 2020, replacing The Sunday Edition, but retains a similar format of interviews and documentary reports on political, social and cultural topics in the news.

At the first or second broadcast of each month during the show's regular season, the show has a recurring game segment called "That's Puzzling" where contestants featuring the host, various CBC personalities, and select viewers who won the chance by completing a word challenge, compete in word games. In July and August, recordings of That's Puzzling games are broadcast as a summer replacement series.

The program airs on Sunday mornings from 9 to 11 a.m., with the entire show rebroadcast at 10 p.m.
