= Liz Grogan =

Liz Grogan is a Canadian television host.

She co-hosted CBWT's Noon Hour program in the 1970s.

Later she moved to CTV on the program Live It Up!, one of the first co-hosts in the program.

She was co-host with Peter Feniak of CTV's Lifetime between 1986 and 1988, but had to leave the show because she was pregnant.

In the mid-1990s she co-hosted a health phone-in program with Dr. Rosana Pellizzari on WTN, Doctor on Call. She hosted Globetrotter, a travel program for women, on WTN for the 1996–97 season.

On September 12, 1987 she married freelance cinematographer Doug McLellan.
