= John Gray (Canadian author) =

Canadian journalist and author (1937–2020)

- Born: John Anthony Morgan Gray; April 28, 1937
- Died: September 23, 2020 (aged 83); Toronto, Ontario, Canada
- Occupation(s): Journalist, author
- Spouse: Elizabeth Gray

John Gray on Bookbits radio.

John Anthony Morgan Gray (April 28, 1937 – September 23, 2020) was a Canadian journalist and author whose work included Paul Martin: The Power of Ambition, a biography with an emphasis on Martin's lifelong quest to be prime minister. A journalist with the Ottawa Citizen, Gray also had many roles in 20 years of work for The Globe and Mail, including writer, editor, foreign correspondent, and Ottawa bureau chief. He won three National Newspaper Awards.

John Gray was married to journalist and CBC Radio broadcaster Elizabeth Gray, née Binks. He died from complications of Parkinson's disease in Toronto, on September 23, 2020, at the age of 83.

== Sources ==
- Sarah Murdoch, "John Anthony Morgan Gray", Globe and Mail, December 18, 2020
