= Chris Howden =

Canadian radio producer and broadcaster

Chris Howden is a Canadian radio producer and broadcaster, who was named co-host of As It Happens, the flagship news interview program on CBC Radio One, in December 2019. He is a longtime producer and head writer for the program, who was sometimes heard on the air as a fill-in announcer when prior co-host Jeff Douglas was absent. He has also been host of the CBC Radio documentary series Living Out Loud.

Originally from Niagara-on-the-Lake, Ontario, Howden has also performed on stage with Gord Rand in the comedy duo Trophy Wives.
