= Donald Low =

Donald Low (May 2, 1945 - September 18, 2013) was a Canadian microbiologist noted for his role in battling the SARS outbreak of 2003. He was microbiologist-in-chief at Mount Sinai Hospital, Toronto, from 1985 to 2013.

Low graduated from medical school at the University of Manitoba. Low became a familiar face to the Canadian public during 2003's SARS crisis; although he had no official role, he was seen as calm and effective in press conferences about the response to the outbreak. He was one of several physicians who were required to quarantine themselves at home during part of the outbreak. In 2005 he took on the role of medical director of public health laboratory of the Ontario Agency for Health Protection and Promotion. Low was also a noted expert in necrotizing fasciitis due to Group A streptococcus.

Low's wife was CBC News reporter Maureen Taylor. He had three children from a previous marriage. Low was diagnosed with a brain tumour in February 2013, and died on September 18, 2013, at age 68. In a video published after his death, Low calls for Canada to allow assisted suicide, saying "I’m just frustrated with not being able to have control of my own life, not being able to make the decision myself when enough is enough."
