= St. Mark's Anglican Church (Port Hope, Ontario) =

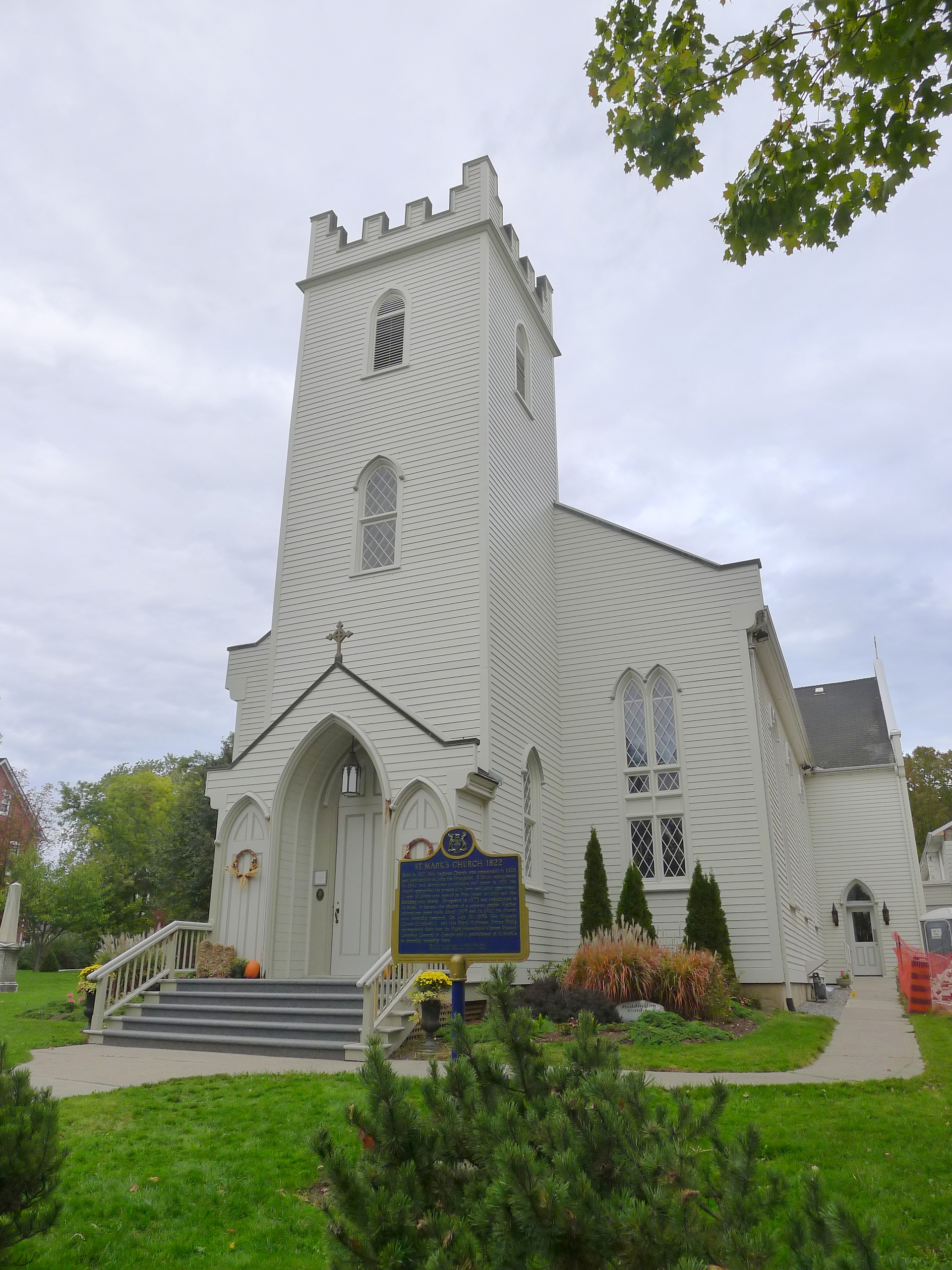
- St. Mark's Anglican Church
- 43.951504°N 78.289949°W
- Address: 51 King Street, Port Hope, Ontario, Canada
- Denomination: Anglican Church of Canada
- Website: stmarksporthope.ca

History
- Founded: 1873
- Dedication: Saint Mark the Evangelist

Architecture
- Style: Carpenter Gothic
- Years built: 1822–1824

Administration
- Province: Ontario
- Diocese: Toronto

Clergy
- Rector: The Rev. Johanna Pak

St. Mark's Anglican Church is a historic Anglican church in Port Hope, Ontario, Canada. The Carpenter Gothic church building dates from the 1820s and was the original home of St. John the Evangelist Anglican Church, now located in a larger stone building on Pine Street. The congregation dedicated to St. Mark was established in 1873.

The churchyard is the resting place of Vincent Massey, the first Canadian-born Governor General of Canada.

== History ==
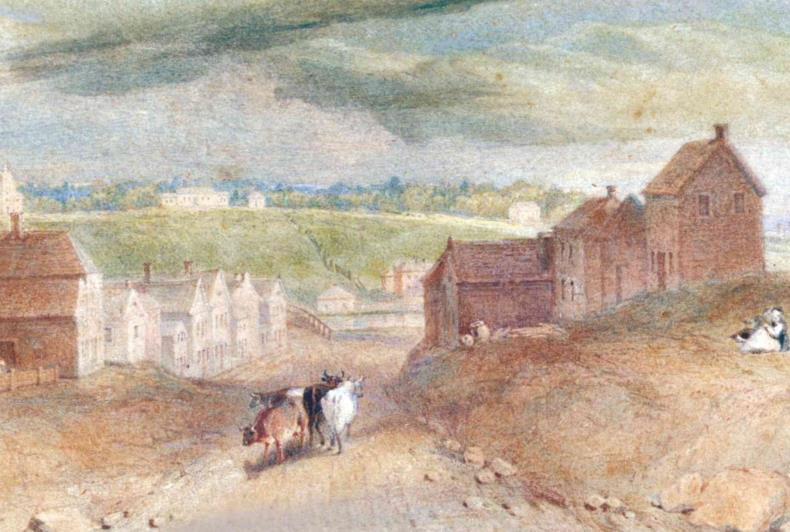
Watercolour of the town of Port Hope with Protestant Hill and the then-St. John's Church visible, 1833

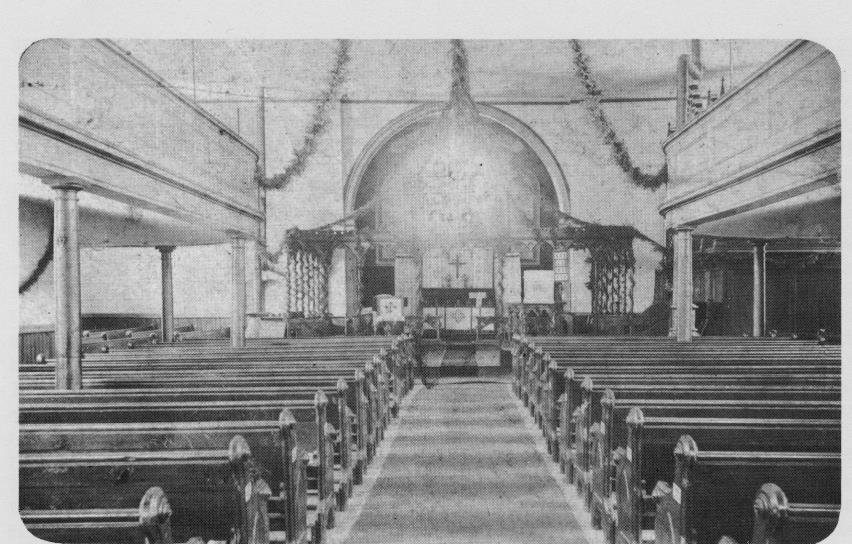
The church interior, c. 1895

In 1822, Elias Smith, founder of Port Hope, gave land for the construction of St. John the Evangelist Church on what was then known as Protestant Hill. The wood-frame church was completed in 1824 and consecrated in 1828. The bell, cast in Albany, New York, was installed in 1826. The church was extended and galleries were added in 1842. A second expansion by architect Kivas Tully in 1845 added north and south transepts.

By 1865, St. John the Evangelist Church had outgrown the building and in 1869, the congregation moved to a larger, brick building on Pine Street. The church sat abandoned with the bell removed and buried.

In 1872, a group of St. John's parishioners petitioned the diocese to reopen the church as a new parish. The building was restored and reopened dedicated to Saint Mark the Evangelist in 1873. Further alterations were made in 1895 and the church was damaged by fire in 1925.

On July 26, 1959, Queen Elizabeth II and Prince Philip, Duke of Edinburgh, accompanied Vincent Massey, Governor General of Canada, to a service of morning prayer at St. Mark's. The royal couple was staying at Batterwood, Massey's nearby estate at Canton. Massey's wife, Alice Massey, was buried in the churchyard in 1950 and he was buried alongside her upon his death in 1967. The triptych painted by Sylvia Hahn above the altar was donated by the Massey family in memory of their deceased family members in 1957.

== Architecture ==
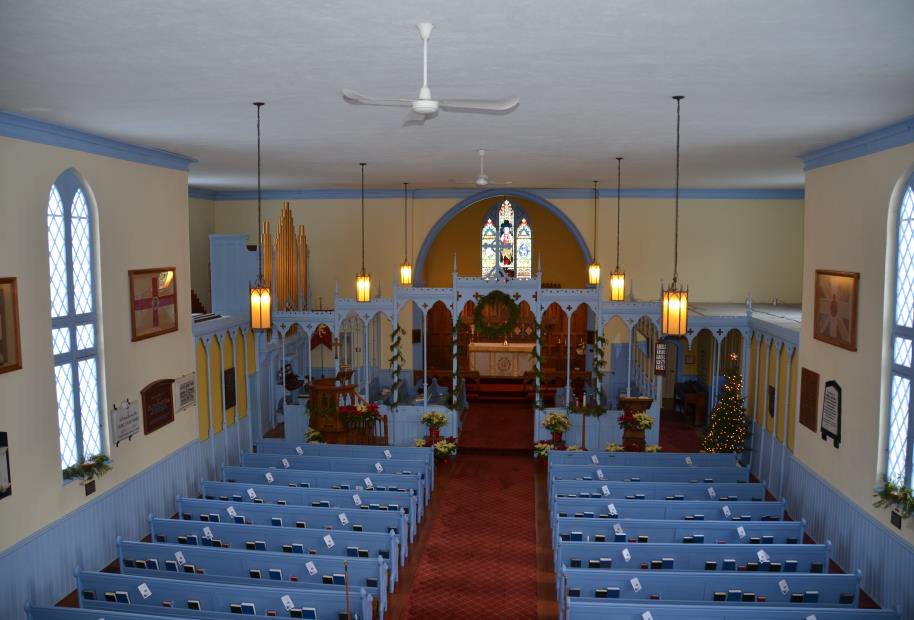
The church interior

St. Mark's is an example of the Carpenter Gothic style, a vernacular style of North America employing Gothic Revival detailing on wooden buildings and structures.

The interior of the church is notable for its painted pews and chancel screen.

== Cemetery ==
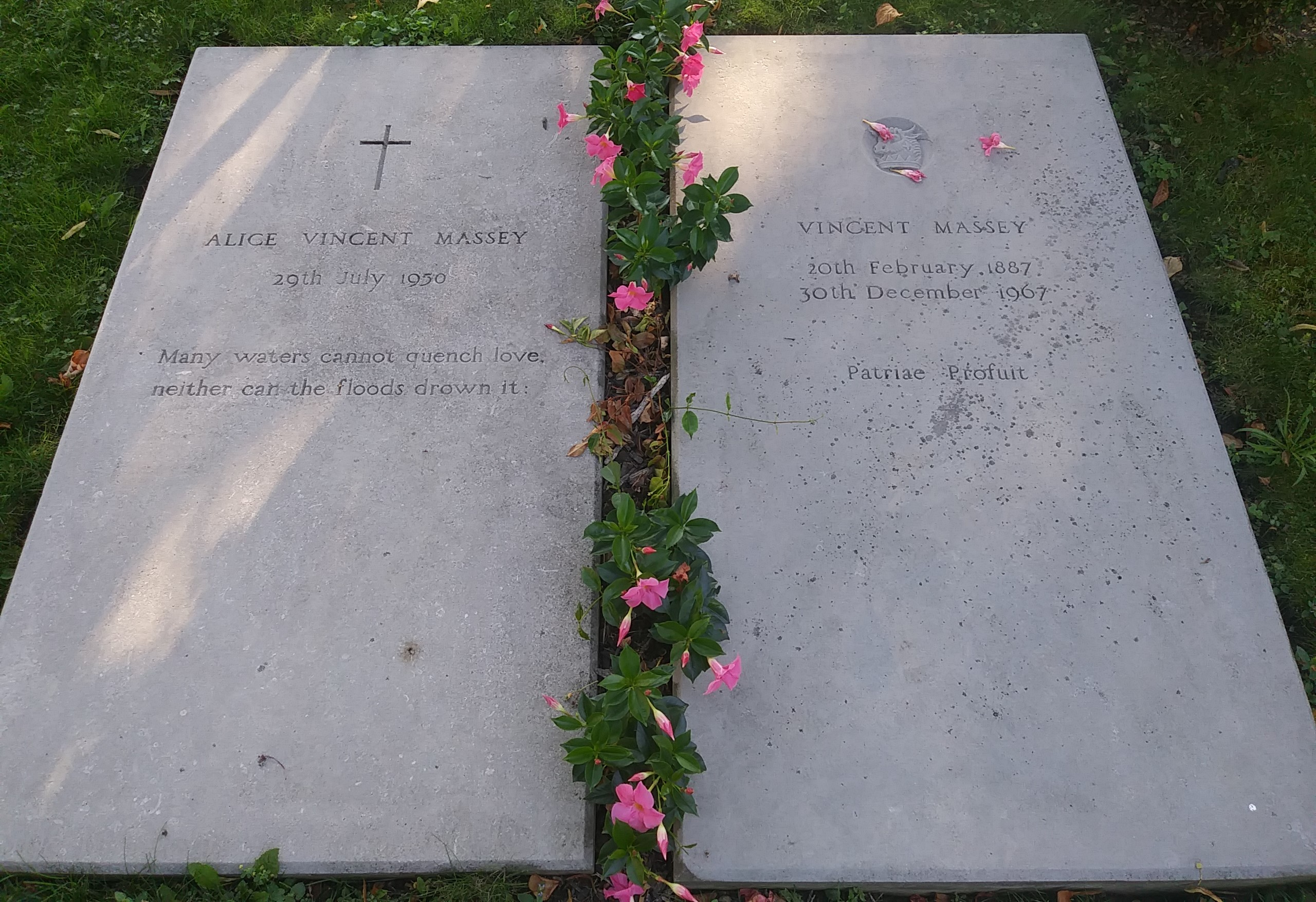
The graves of Alice and Vincent Massey

The cemetery in St. Mark's churchyard was consecrated by Charles Stewart, Bishop of Quebec, 1830. The first recorded burial took place in 1822. Notable internments include Vincent Massey, 18th and first Canadian-born Governor General of Canada, and his wife Alice Massey, radio broadcaster Alan Maitland, and writer Farley Mowat.

== See also ==
- List of oldest buildings in Canada
