= St. Luke's Cultural Heritage Centre =

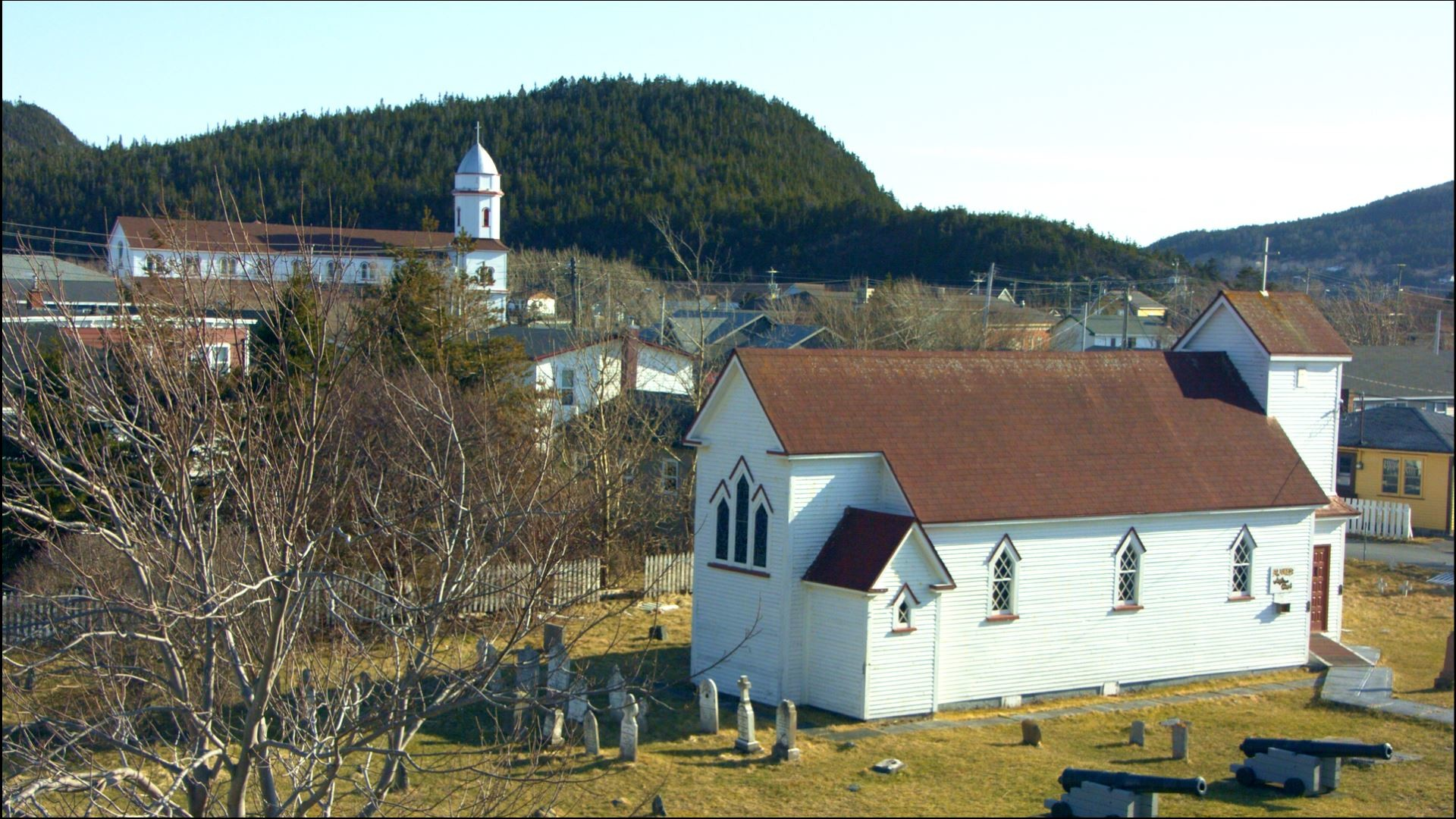
- Shot of St. Luke's in front of Sacred Heart church in Placentia, Newfoundland

- Location within Canada Location within Newfoundland
- 47°14′45″N 53°57′40″W
- Location: Placentia
- Country: Canada
- Website: Placentia History

History
- Former name: St. Luke's Anglican Church
- Dedication: Luke the Evangelist

Architecture
- Style: Gothic Revival
- Years built: 1906-1908

St. Luke's Cultural Heritage Centre (formerly St. Luke's Anglican Church) is a heritage centre in the town of Placentia, Newfoundland and Labrador, Canada. Formerly an Anglican church, it has since been acquired by the Placentia Area Historical Society and is used for hosting events throughout the year. The historical society also owns the O'Reilly House Museum which is located next-door to the heritage centre. Until the 1950s, St. Luke's was considered the smallest church in Newfoundland.

== History ==
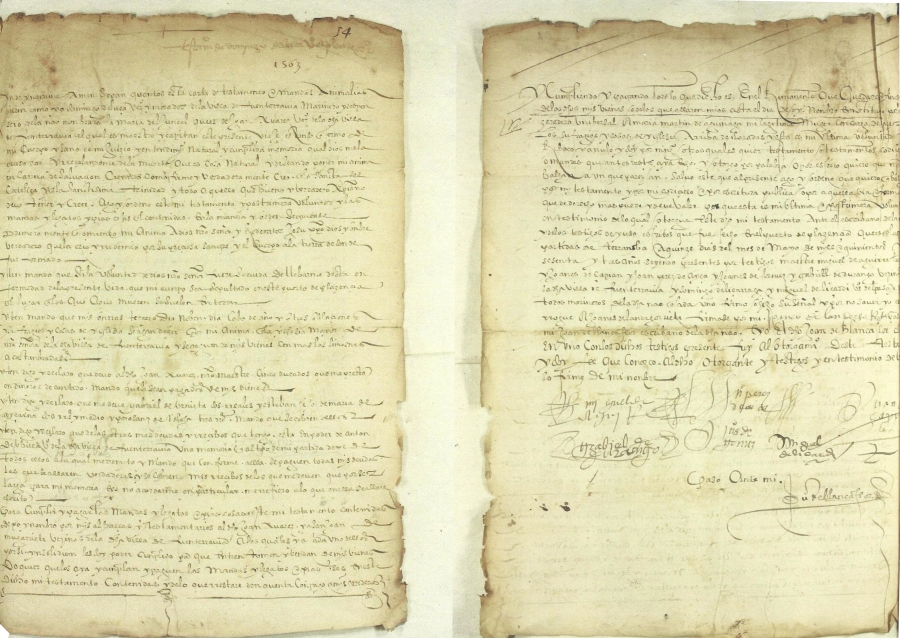
The Basque will of Domingo de Luca, the oldest written civil document in Canada, now in archive in Spain. Domingo was more than likely buried on the site of current day St. Luke's in 1563.

St. Luke's sits on the site of the oldest Catholic church in Newfoundland, with the oldest church being built by the Recollet friars in 1689, and was more than likely used by Anglicans after Placentia was handed to English rule after the Treaty of Utrecht. In the year 1563, a Basque sailor by the name of Domingo de Luca fell ill aboard a ship, and requested that he be buried in Placentia saying in his will "that my body be buried in this port of Plazençia in the place where those who die here are usually buried". His will is oldest-known civil document written in Canada, and is currently kept in archive in Spain. It implies the existence of a place where Basque people were laying their people to rest, which is more than likely where Basque headstones were found dating back to as early as 1676. These headstones are now on display at the nearby O'Reilly House Museum. Plenty of other old gravestones fill the graveyard surrounding the site, many having a story of their own to tell.

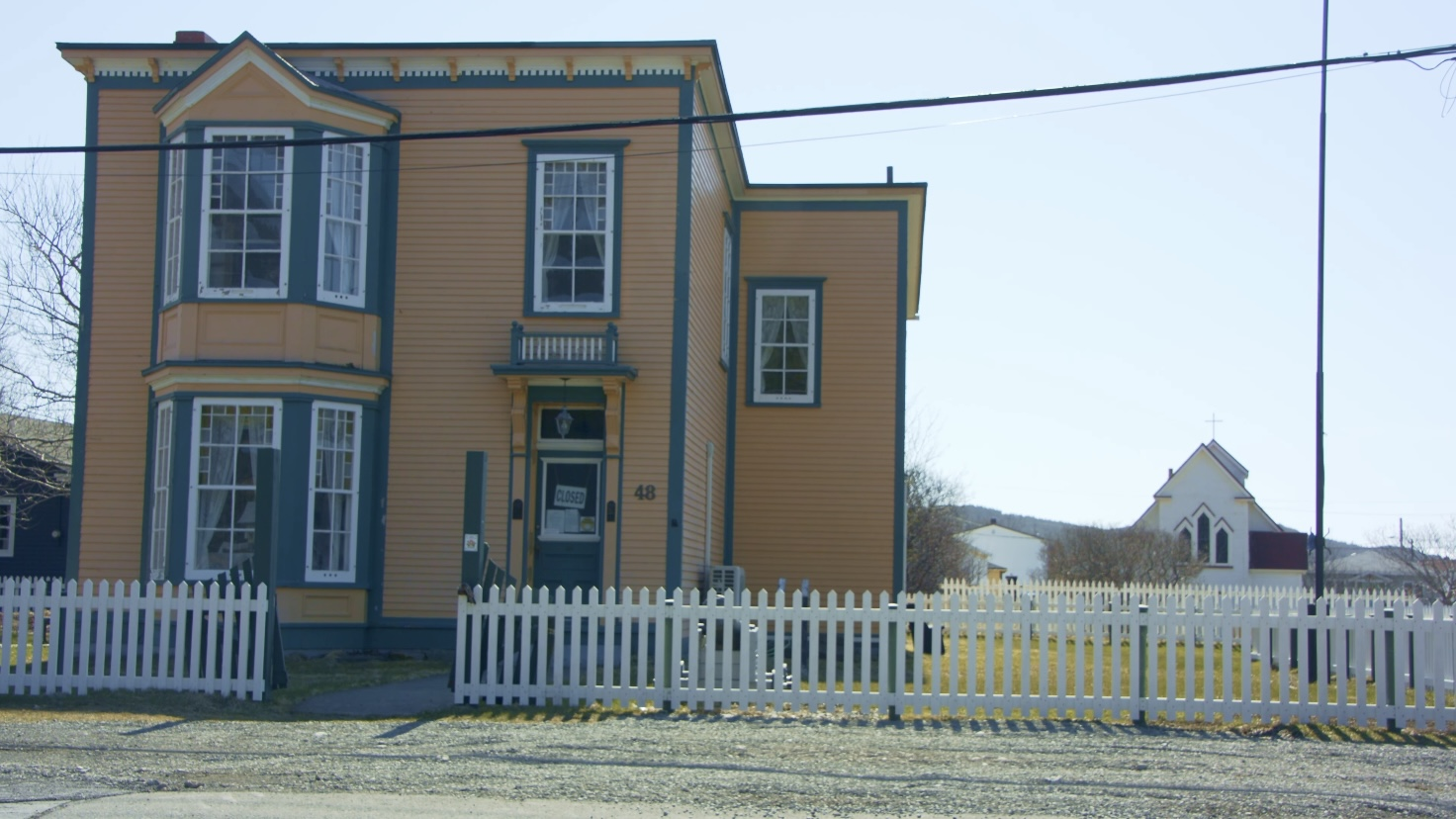
St. Luke's behind the O'Reilly House Museum, also owned by the historical society.

After the acquisition of Placentia to England, King George III presented a tipstaff to the town in 1772, which is now on display at the O'Reilly House Museum. In the summer of 1786, Prince William Henry was stationed as a naval surrogate judge in Placentia. He left behind a silver tea set used by himself, and the coat of arms that still hangs inside St. Luke's. There is also a communion service donated by the royal family. The cannons on the site are originally from nearby Fort Fredrick and were forged during the reign of Queen Anne, showing the church's strong ties to England.

The current building was built between 1906 and 1908, and features original stained glass windows, a lectern and font from a previous church in the 18th century, handmade wooden pews, and a bell upstairs. After the purchase of the building by the historical society, there have been plenty of renovations and upgrades to make the space more accessible to all, including adding a wheelchair accessible washroom and ramps, new seat padding and sound/video equipment, allowing for more presentations and events to be able to be held inside the former church.

== Heritage Centre ==
Due to the rich history of the site and building, it was designated as a Registered Heritage Structure of Newfoundland and Labrador in 2000. It is the fourth structure to receive this status in Placentia, the other three being the Rosedale Manor, the Angle American Telegraph Office and the O'Reilly House museum. Due to dwindling amount of parishioners, the church was closed in October 2020 and deconsecrated. The historical society then bought the site for one dollar, and now uses it to host workshops, presentations, performances, and tours to promote the local culture and history of the Placentia area.

== Legacy ==
St. Luke's was featured in the student documentary The Little Church That Could. The film talks to people involved with the transition of the site to a heritage centre, plans to run an escape room inside the building, and future plans for the site going forward. The documentary was an official selection at the local Nickel Independent Film Festival in St. John's, Newfoundland and Labrador in 2023, the Paris Awards Film Festival in Paris, France, and at the History International Film Festival 2023 in Austria.

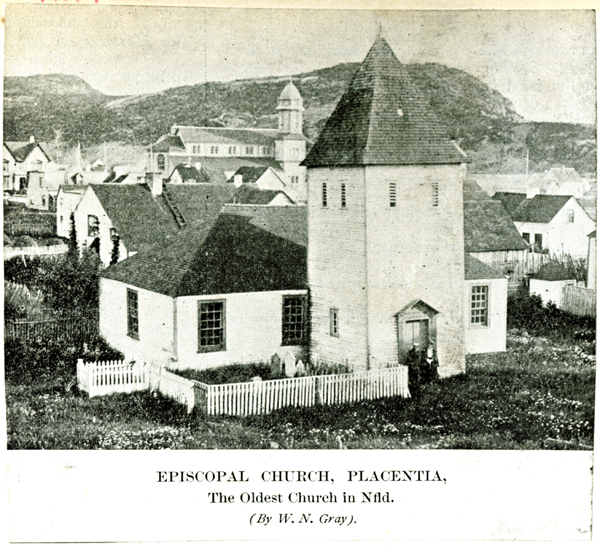
Episcopal Church, Placentia, The Oldest Church in Nfld (Newfoundland) by W. N. Gray (18th Century)

== See also ==
- O'Reilly House Museum
- Castle Hill, Newfoundland and Labrador
