= Living (2007 TV program) =

Living is a group of regional Canadian lifestyle television programs that aired on CBC Television stations. The initial broadcast was on January 15, 2007. Due to budgetary issues, the Living programs were not continued past the end of the 2008–09 television season. The final episodes of each Living series aired on August 28, 2009.

Most of the CBC stations which aired Living produced their own locally oriented programs. Most used the title format Living (Location), although the shows in Toronto and Ottawa were titled Living in (Location) due to similarly named programs on Rogers TV in those markets.

== Overview ==
Similar to the 1970s U.S. syndicated series PM Magazine, each local Living program consists of a mixture of locally produced segments and others produced for national broadcast.

In most markets, the series aired at 3:00 p.m. local time weekdays. Repeats of the Newfoundland and Labrador edition, which initially aired at 3:30 NT, later aired Tuesday to Friday at 7:00 p.m. NT on CBNT, to fill a half-hour gap in the national schedule caused by the local newscast airing at 6:00 p.m. NT.

Segments from the Living programs were later repurposed for a national series titled Breeze, hosted by Maureen Welch in Ottawa. That program aired during the 2010–11 season as part of the Saturday daytime schedule on CBC.

== List of Living programs ==
- Living Calgary (CBRT; also aired on CBXT) - hosted by Alex Ruiz
- Living Halifax, formerly Living East (CBHT; also aired on CBCT/CBAT) - hosted by Heidi Petracek
- Living in Ottawa (CBOT) - hosted by Maureen Welch
- Living in Toronto (CBLT; also aired on CBET) - hosted by Mary Ito
- Living Montreal (CBMT) - hosted by Sue Smith
- Living Newfoundland and Labrador (CBNT) - hosted by Erin Sulley
- Living Saskatchewan (CBKT) - hosted by Connie Walker
- Living Vancouver (CBUT) - hosted by Jaeny Baik
- Living Winnipeg (CBWT) - hosted by Mary McCown
