= Jack McGaw =

Canadian journalist

- Born: John Howard David McGaw; May 22, 1936; Winnipeg, Manitoba, Canada
- Died: October 18, 2012 (aged 76); Kitchener, Ontario, Canada
- Education: University of British Columbia
- Occupation: journalist
- Television: Live It Up!; W5
- Spouses: Ann Nuttall (m. 1956, divorced) Ann Medina (m. 1975, divorced) Marcia Macleod (m. 1986)
- Children: 3

John Howard David "Jack" McGaw (May 22, 1936 – October 18, 2012) was a Canadian journalist and radio operator. He was a cohost of the consumer newsmagazine Live It Up! in the early 1980s, and subsequently produced and hosted freelance documentary programming.

In the mid-1990s, McGaw launched a tourist information radio station on Vancouver Island. He subsequently moved to Halifax in 2001, and operated that city's CIRH-FM, and similar stations in the Information Radio network in locations across Canada.

McGaw was born in Winnipeg, Manitoba and grew up in Chilliwack, British Columbia. He married three times in his life and had three children with his first wife. He died of gallbladder cancer on October 18, 2012 in Kitchener, Ontario, at the age of 76.
