= Antonio Michael Downing =

Trinidadian-Canadian writer and broadcaster

Antonio Michael Downing is a Trinidadian-Canadian writer, musician and broadcaster, best known as the host of CBC Radio One's weekly literary talk show The Next Chapter since 2024.

Growing up in Trinidad and Tobago, Downing was initially raised by his grandmother after his parents were unable to take care of him and his brother. When his grandmother died, he moved to Sioux Lookout, Ontario to live with his aunt, where they were one of the only Black Canadian families in a town whose residents were predominantly white or indigenous; his aunt worked as a social worker in indigenous communities in the region, so Downing often also lived with billeted indigenous students.

== Music ==
In his early adulthood moved to Waterloo Region, where he worked in sales for BlackBerry while trying to establish himself as a musician. He performed music under a variety of pseudonyms, including Mic Dainjah and John Orpheus, exploring a wide variety of styles including hip-hop, soul, blues and punk rock, and performed with various bands in the Kitchener-Waterloo area, including Stone Prophets and Jen Militia.

As John Orpheus, he released the EPs Goatchain Hennessey and Goatlife in 2018 before releasing his debut album, Wey Ya Call Dat Ting?, in 2019.

== Writing ==
He published the novella Molasses in 2011.

In 2018 he received a mentorship from writer Max Wallace, under the auspices of the RBC Taylor Prize's mentorship program for emerging writers.

He published the childhood memoir Saga Boy: My Life of Blackness and Becoming in 2021. The book was released concurrently with Saga King, his second full-length John Orpheus album.

In 2024 he published Stars in My Crown, a children's book with illustration by Richy Sanchez Ayala.

His debut novel, Black Cherokee, was published in 2025, and was shortlisted for the 2026 Amazon Canada First Novel Award.
