= Alan Edmonds =

Arthur Denis Edmonds (1932 – September 13, 2004), better known by his pseudonym Alan Edmonds, was a reporter for newspapers, magazines, and television. Edmonds was born in England. He was a reporter on Fleet Street in London, England and after the war, immigrated to Canada, first to Vancouver, British Columbia, and, then Toronto. He wrote for the Toronto Star, among others, and subsequently for Maclean's Magazine, where he was the Senior Editor at one point. He wrote a number of articles while at Maclean's, among them one on Steven Truscott. He wrote a number of books as well, among them, Journey to the Edge of the World, which was a scrutiny of a research vessel plying the waters of Canada's far north. He was on-air talent, writer and producer for the highly successful CTV program Live It Up!

In 1986 he published the memoir Living It Up...and Down, which was a shortlisted finalist for the Stephen Leacock Memorial Medal for Humour in 1987.

He died on September 13, 2004, of liver disease.
