= Sunday Morning (radio program) =

Canadian radio program

- Genre: newsmagazine
- Country of origin: Canada
- Home station: CBC Radio
- Hosted by: Bronwyn Drainie (1976-81); Bruce Rogers (1976-77); Warner Troyer (1977-79); Patrick Martin (1979-81); Russ Patrick (1981-83); Barbara Smith (1981-86); Linden MacIntyre (1986-88); Mary Lou Finlay (1988-94); Ian Brown (1994-97)
- Created by: Mark Starowicz
- Recording studio: Toronto, Ontario
- Original release: November 7, 1976 – June 15, 1997

Sunday Morning was a Canadian radio news and information program, which aired on CBC Radio One from 1976 to 1997.

Created by producer Mark Starowicz as a "Sunday New York Times of the air", the magazine style program was one of the highest-budget and highest-rated shows on CBC Radio during its run. Although the program's centrepiece was radio documentaries, the show also featured interviews, round table discussions, book reviews, arts reports, puzzles and various features designed to resemble an audio version of a high-end newspaper.

== History ==
The program, running three hours from 9 a.m. to noon in the Eastern time zone and further west, featured coverage of current news during the first two hours, and focused on arts during the final hour. The program was launched in 1976 with Bronwyn Drainie and Bruce Rogers as hosts. Rogers was replaced after several months by Warner Troyer.

In 1979, Troyer reduced his workload, continuing as a literary critic for the program but retiring as cohost; he was succeeded by Patrick Martin.

Stuart McLean was associated with the show in its early years as a documentary reporter and producer. He won an ACTRA Award in 1979 for "Operation White Knight", his Sunday Morning documentary about the Jonestown Massacre.

For much of its run, comedian Nancy White contributed a weekly satirical song to the second hour of the program.

In 1981, the program won two ACTRA Awards, for Best Radio Program and Best Host or Interviewer in a Radio Program (Martin and Drainie). That fall, Martin and Drainie were replaced by Russ Patrick and Barbara Smith, and the program was revamped so that it shared the same production staff as the weekday news program As It Happens. McLean became the show's executive producer. Patrick left the show in 1983 to join the staff of The Journal, and Smith continued to host with a rotating stable of cohosts that included Eric Malling, Michael Enright, Christopher Thomas, Peter Benesh and Dale Goldhawk.

Linden MacIntyre became sole host of the program in 1986. He was succeeded by Mary Lou Finlay in 1988. She left the series in 1994, and was succeeded by Ian Brown, the show's final host.

The series ended in 1997 after twenty years when CBC Radio merged Sunday Morning with Morningside to create the new morning series This Morning. In 2000, the programming schedule was altered again and the Sunday morning block was made a separate program again as The Sunday Edition.
