= King of the Grizzlies =

- Theatrical release poster
- Directed by: Ron Kelly
- Screenplay by: Jack Speirs; Rod Peterson; Norman Wright
- Based on: The Biography of a Grizzly by Ernest Thompson Seton
- Produced by: Winston Hibler
- Starring: John Yesno; Chris Wiggins; Hugh Webster; Jack Van Evera
- Narrated by: Winston Hibler
- Cinematography: Reginald H. Morris
- Edited by: G. Gregg McLaughlin
- Music by: Buddy Baker
- Production company: Walt Disney Productions Robert Lawrence Productions
- Distributed by: Buena Vista Distribution
- Release date: February 11, 1970
- Running time: 93 minutes
- Countries: United States; Canada
- Language: English

King of the Grizzlies is a 1970 adventure film directed by Ron Kelly and written by Jack Speirs, Rod Peterson and Norman Wright as a loose adaptation of Ernest Thompson Seton's 1900 novel Biography Of A Grizzly. The film stars John Yesno, Chris Wiggins, Hugh Webster and Jack Van Evera. The film was released on February 11, 1970, by Buena Vista Distribution.

== Plot ==
Moki, a Cree Indian in the late 19th-century West, works as a foreman on the ranch belonging to his former Army commanding officer, Colonel Pearson. Moki wears the sign of the tribal totem on his hand—a four-toed track, the mark of the grizzly bear. A grizzly bear invades Pearson's land and kills a steer. Pearson shoots the bear and one of her cubs, missing the other. The surviving cub falls over a cliff and into a river and is swept downstream.

Moki searches for the cub and learns that it has only four toes on one of its feet. He names it Wahb, which means four-toed grizzly. He captures the bear, and sets him free on the outskirts of Pearson's land. Wahb survives and grows to maturity. At three years of age, Wahb appears and frightens a ranch hand, whereupon Pearson orders Moki to trap the bear; but Wahb avoids capture.

Several years later, Moki encounters Wahb in the mountains. As the bear does not harm him, Moki concludes that a mystical tie binds Wahb's destiny with his own. Wahb reappears on the Pearson ranch at roundup time and stampedes the cattle. Pearson sets out to kill Wahb, but the wily bear doubles back and begins to track his pursuer. Moki attempts to warn Pearson of his danger but to no avail. Pearson meets the bear head on; his horse rears and Pearson is thrown. Wahb is about to attack Pearson when Moki arrives as he climbs down to the colonel.

As Moki is examining the colonel's injuries, Wahb appears. Moki is armed with only a pistol which is definitely not sufficient to stop an angry grizzly bear. Wahb departs, leaving Moki and consequently Colonel Pearson unharmed. Moki attempts to get Pearson to stop, but his mind is made up. Just when the colonel is about to pull the trigger, Wahb begins to mark a tree with his claws. Moki tells the colonel that, because of this, Wahb will not return to the Gray Bull (which is true; he will stay and protect his territory). Still unconvinced, Colonel Pearson raises his gun one more time, but again Moki calls his name, and, when the colonel turns, he sees the rifle shells in Moki's hand. Seeing how much the bear means to Moki and hoping he will stay away from the Gray Bull now, Colonel Pearson relents, and they head back home.

== Cast ==
- Big Ted as Wahb
- John Yesno as Moki
- Chris Wiggins as Colonel Pearson
- Hugh Webster as Shorty Russell
- Jack Van Evera as Slim
- Winston Hibler as the narrator

== Music ==
Buddy Baker wrote the score for King of the Grizzlies. The film features one original song written by Jack Speirs. A cowboy sings "The Campfire Is Home" around a nighttime campfire at roundup time for Colonel Pearson's cattle herd.

== See also ==
- List of American films of 1970
