= As It Happens =

Canadian radio interview show

- Genre: Newsmaker interviews
- Running time: 90 min. weekdays, 6:30–8:00 p.m.
- Country of origin: Canada
- Home station: CBC Radio One
- Hosted by: Nil Köksal
- Announcer: Chris Howden
- Original release: 1968 – present
- Website: cbc.ca/asithappens/
- Podcast: cbc.ca/podcasting/includes/asithappens.xml

As It Happens is a Canadian interview show that airs on CBC Radio One in Canada and various public radio stations in the United States through Public Radio Exchange. Its 50th anniversary was celebrated on-air on November 16, 2018. It has been one of the most popular and acclaimed shows on CBC Radio.

The bulk of the program consists of a CBC journalist, currently Nil Köksal since 2022, conducting telephone interviews with newsmakers and other persons of interest. The other co-host, Chris Howden as of January 6, 2020, introduces the interviews and other segments, such as "For the Record" recordings of speeches or press conferences, and musical interludes (or as former co-host Barbara Budd often referred to them, "the dance portion of the program").

== Stations and time ==
The show is broadcast each weekday from 6:30 to 8:00 p.m. (half an hour later in Newfoundland) throughout Canada. It used to be widely accessible to much of the northern United States, but as the CBC switched its CBC Radio One from powerful AM signals in Eastern Canadian urban centres to FM stations, it became harder to receive CBC content further away from the border.

As It Happens can be heard on CBC Radio One's channel 169 on Sirius XM Satellite Radio (in both Canada and the U.S.), on an increasing number of American public radio stations, especially NPR affiliates with news radio formats, via distribution from CBC's American distribution partner Public Radio Exchange, and on the Internet via streaming audio at the CBC's website. Older broadcasts are available as a stream from the CBC's website, but without the music.

As It Happens is heard on a delayed-broadcast basis in the United States, generally airing in a later-evening slot and often paired with Q; American stations that carry As It Happens do not air the final half-hour (7:30 to 8:00 p.m.) of the program.

In the fall of 2009, the show also added an hour long repeat airing at midnight on weeknights called As It Happens: The Midnight Edition, which features an abbreviated edition of the 6:30 p.m. broadcast. Thanks to shorter run time, many of the less important interviews and stories are cut from the midnight rerun to fit the reduced air time, so the midnight broadcast is virtually identical to the American NPR edit. However, in the summer months of July and August, the program is reduced to an hour in its regular time slot, which means the midnight edition airs all the content during that period.

During the summer, the program ends at 7:30 and is followed by a half-hour program from the network's schedule of short-run summer series. Most summers, one of those summer series is As It Happened: The Archive Edition, a separate program which airs previously broadcast interviews from the main series

== History ==
The show was introduced in 1968 as a reverse call-in show: rather than having the public call in, the reporters at As It Happens called newsmakers and pundits for their opinions.

During the 1970s, the program produced 54-minute-long segments called "As It Happened, (insert year)", covering the major events of years past, particularly the 1930s and 1940s. During the CBC technicians strike in 1981, after a few weeks of music, the As It Happened segments were played each weeknight in chronological order as repeat filler material until the strike was resolved.

When the interviewer is absent, other CBC journalists typically sit in as substitute interviewers; when the announcer is absent, substitutes may include other CBC personalities, actors such as R. H. Thomson, or program staffers; Howden himself sometimes appeared on the program as a guest announcer before being named co-host effective January 6, 2020.

In January 2022, long-time host Carol Off announced her retirement from As It Happens, effective February 25. In July 2022, it was announced that Nil Köksal will debut as former host Off's successor in September.

=== Hosts ===
- 1968–1969: Phillip Forsyth, Harry Brown and William Ronald
- 1969–1971: Harry Brown and William Ronald
- 1971–1973: Barbara Frum, Harry Brown, Cy Strange
- 1973–1974: Barbara Frum and Harry Brown
- 1974–1981: Barbara Frum and Alan Maitland
- 1981–1985: Elizabeth Gray and Alan Maitland
- 1985–1987: Dennis Trudeau and Alan Maitland
- 1987–1993: Michael Enright and Alan Maitland
- 1993–1997: Michael Enright and Barbara Budd
- 1997–2005: Mary Lou Finlay and Barbara Budd
- 2006–2010: Carol Off and Barbara Budd
- 2010: Carol Off and guest host
- 2011–2019: Carol Off and Jeff Douglas
- 2019: Carol Off and guest host
- 2020–2022: Carol Off and Chris Howden
- 2022–present: Nil Köksal and Chris Howden

== Notable interviews ==
The show has had many notable interviews, including:

- the wife of Aleksandr Solzhenitsyn just after his arrest.
- Sandra Good, the best friend of Squeaky Fromme, just after her friend had attempted to shoot Gerald Ford.
- a Rwandan woman seemingly moments away from being killed by Tutsi militia during the 1994 Rwandan genocide—she stayed on the phone with As It Happens up to the point when the attackers knocked on her door. She was ultimately spared.

The show has also interviewed a wide array of presidents, prime ministers, terrorists, inventors, and authors.

== Humour ==
Despite the gravity of many of its stories, As It Happens is also known for being lighthearted and carrying news of the obscure and bizarre. For instance, during the early 1990s there were updates for several years on the battle over a large fibreglass fish that annoyed a neighbour in England. The show opens with humorous synopses of the day's stories, which are followed by a pun based on one of the same. An example is "radio that reads between the Linuses," following a story about baseball stats in the Peanuts comic strip. As it happens, the show's title is also a pun.

Former host Barbara Frum once interviewed Cookie Monster from Sesame Street. Another well-remembered interview was with a hard-of-hearing but imperturbable British farmer who had grown a prize-winning giant cabbage. The 1976 interview was conducted by an increasingly frustrated Frum, who could not get the farmer to give any kind of coherent replies to her straightforward questions; by mid-interview, Frum was stuck repeatedly asking the question, "What did you feed your cabbage?" a little bit louder each time. Exasperated, she finally asks him "WHAT. DID. YOU. FEED. THE. GODDAMN. CABBAGE?". It is still occasionally played as an amusing interlude on the show, as well as on CBC Radio's afternoon series Rewind.

After Lloyd Robertson left CBC Television for CTV in 1976, the program conducted its own on-air auditions for his replacement as anchor of The National, eventually choosing Robert Stanfield as its nominee.

Barbara Budd and Mary Lou Finlay maintained a recurring debate over whether ABBA's "Dancing Queen" was an appropriate choice of bumper music between interviews, and Budd and Carol Off later solicited listener feedback to determine the world's most annoying song. On one occasion when Budd was away on a sick leave that coincided with April Fools' Day, she and Finlay arranged a prank in which Budd gave an interview explaining that she had been given a Canada Council grant to tour the world visiting all the cities whose names she had ever mispronounced on the air.

Following Finlay's retirement in 2005, she published The As It Happens Files, a memoir of her time with the program. The book was subtitled Radio That May Contain Nuts.

=== Distance from Reading ===
A frequently-cited example of the show's sometimes whimsical sense of humour relates to references to the UK town of Reading, Berkshire. After almost any lighter news story or interview that emanates from any location in the UK, the As It Happens host will conclude the piece by straight-facedly noting how far the UK location is from Reading, frequently giving the distance in both miles and some other form of strange, non-standard measurement (e.g., 733,000 garden gnomes, lined up hat to hat).

This long-standing tradition on the show dates from the mid-1970s, when English-born segment producer George Somerwill once concluded a program script with a note that a small village mentioned in the preceding segment was located 'nine miles from Reading'. This note, intended as a serious clarification, was totally baffling to most Canadian listeners—and even to the rest of the show's staff. It quickly became a running joke on the show to identify all places in the UK (even major centres like London) in relation to their proximity to the comparatively obscure borough of Reading.

In her 2009 book The As It Happens Files, former show host Mary Lou Finlay notes that As It Happens had given a boost not just to Reading's profile, but also to its economy: a number of Canadian fans of the show made a point of visiting Reading when they are visiting the UK.

== Christmas and Hanukkah readings ==
During the holiday season in late November and December each year, the show also maintains a tradition of airing one or more Christmas and Hanukkah themed stories narrated by past or present announcers. Alan Maitland's reading of Frederick Forsyth's The Shepherd is always played on the last show before Christmas Day, and Maitland's reading of O. Henry's "The Gift of the Magi" remains a popular staple of the program, as do Barbara Budd's narrations of How the Grinch Stole Christmas! and Aubrey Davis' Bone Button Borscht.

== Music ==
The original opening and closing themes were "Curried Soul" and "Koff Drops" respectively, played by jazz musician Moe Koffman. The second segment of the show begins with a 1987 rearrangement of "Curried Soul" by Billy Bryans.

In September 2013, amidst much on-air fanfare, the decades-old "Curried Soul" opening theme was given a discreetly modernized remix by Socalled. During phone-in segments broadcast in the days following the new theme's premiere, listener reaction was mixed: some preferred the newer mix, while others stated their preference for the original 1969 recording. When Socalled appeared on CBC Radio's Q as a musical guest in June 2015, Off and Douglas joined him for a live performance of the song, with Douglas playing a shaker and Off playing cowbell.

On extraordinary news occasions, the show may also broadcast alternate opening and closing theme music more reflective of a major news story, or may entirely skip opening theme music. For example, on the December 5, 2013 episode marking the death of Nelson Mandela, the show opened and closed with Ladysmith Black Mambazo's recording of "Nkosi Sikelel' iAfrika"; on the October 22, 2014 episode covering the Parliament Hill shootings, the show opened with a montage of audio clips of the day's events, entirely skipping theme music; and on the November 11, 2016 episode following the death of Canadian musical and literary icon Leonard Cohen, the show opened with Cohen's "Bird on the Wire".

== Awards ==
In 2005, the Audio-Visual Preservation Trust of Canada honoured Barbara Frum for her time with As It Happens.
