= Alan Maitland =

Canadian radio broadcaster (1920–1999)

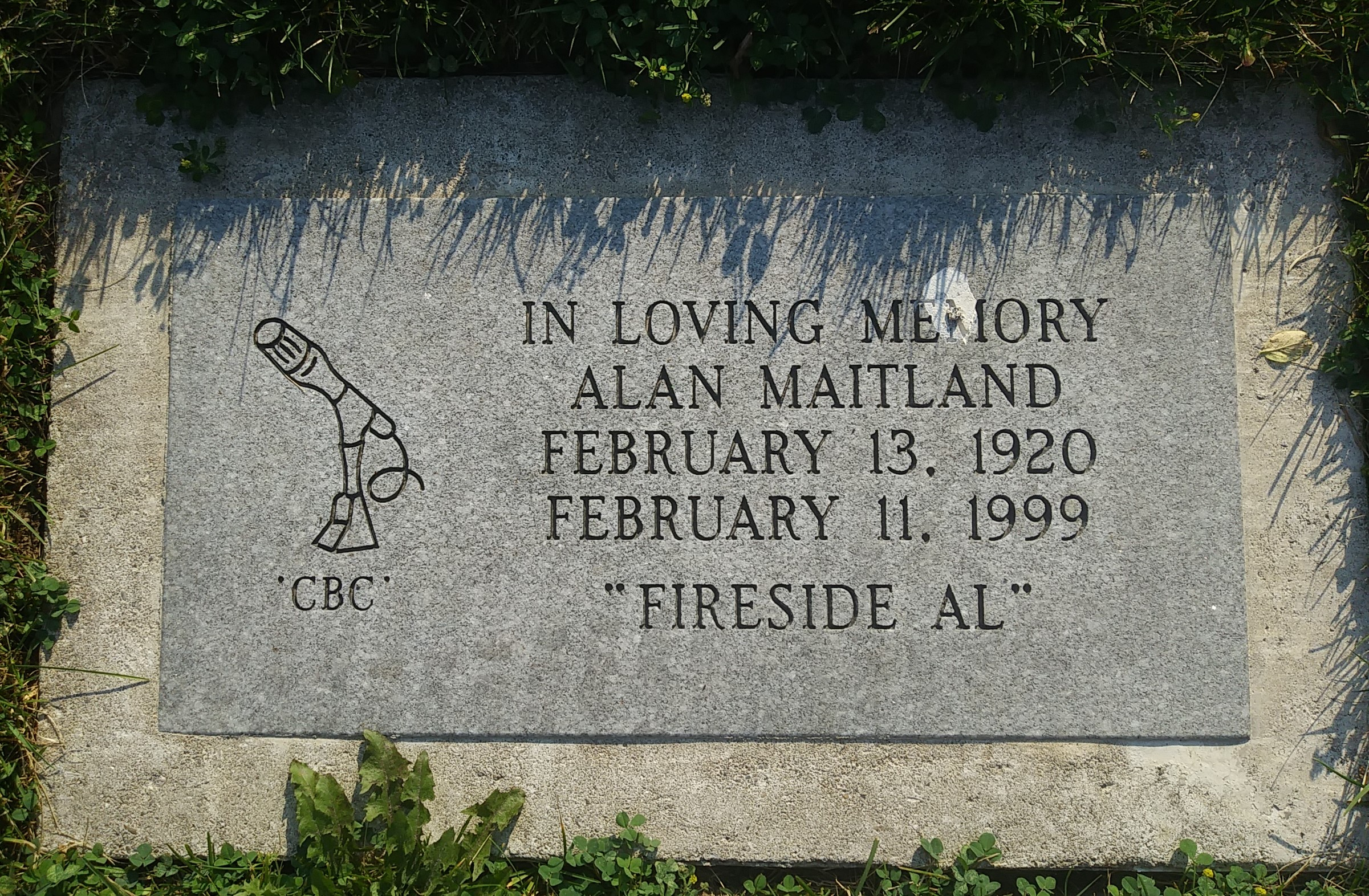
Maitland's grave site at St. Mark's Anglican Church cemetery in Port Hope, Ontario

Alan Maitland (February 13, 1920 – February 11, 1999) was a Canadian radio broadcaster originally from the Ottawa Valley. He was a longtime host for CBC Radio, starting as an announcer in 1947 and was later cohost of As It Happens from 1974 to 1993. He was also part of the administration of CBC Radio for a brief period in 1958 between assignments as an announcer.

In his "Fireside Al" segments on As It Happens and other CBC programs ("Frontporch Al" in summer time), Maitland frequently read short stories, some of which he also published in book form. Some "Fireside Al" segments continue to air on the program to this day, particularly his Christmas Eve readings of seasonal stories, notably Frederick Forsyth's The Shepherd and O. Henry's The Gift of the Magi.

Prior to joining CBC Radio in 1947, Maitland served in the navy during the Second World War. He had musical training and initially applied to CBC to work as a singer.

He died of heart failure due to congestive heart disease in Vancouver, British Columbia at the age of 78.
