= Harry Brown (journalist) =

Canadian radio and television host

Harold Andrew Brown
- Born: 12 January 1930; St. John's, Newfoundland
- Died: 30 March 2002 (aged 72); St. John's, Newfoundland and Labrador, Canada
- Occupation: broadcast journalist
- Known for: As It Happens, Metro Morning
- Spouse: Mary Brown
- Children: Harold Brown; Murray Brown; Keith Brown; Chris Brown; Robin Brown

Harold Andrew Brown (12 January 1930 – 30 March 2002) was a Canadian radio and television host, who was associated with the Canadian Broadcasting Corporation. He was one of the original hosts of As It Happens from 1968 to 1974, and subsequently became host of Metro Morning on CBL in Toronto.

On CBC Television, he was a cohost of Take 30 and Marketplace. He also hosted Speaking Out, a popular phone-in show on TVOntario during the 1980s, as well as the historical TV shows Where Once They Stood and The Undaunted, the latter winning an ACTRA Award for Best Television Program at the 13th ACTRA Awards in 1984.

His daughter, Robin Brown, is also a CBC broadcaster, who hosted the sports program The Inside Track.

Brown was born in St. John's, Newfoundland in 1930. He died in that city following heart surgery in 2002.
