= The Inside Track =

The Inside Track was a Canadian radio series, which formerly aired on CBC Radio One. A documentary and interview series exploring social and cultural issues in the world of sports, the program was hosted by Mark Lee, Mary Hynes and Robin Brown at different times during its run.

One of the show's most famous episodes was "The Last Closet", an hour-long special which aired on October 16, 1993. Exploring issues of homophobia in sports, the show was most noted for its interviews with two gay Canadian athletes who still felt the need to disguise their voices due to the risks of coming out while active in sports; when they both did later come out, Mark Leduc and Mark Tewksbury were revealed to have been the speakers. Other figures interviewed in the episode included Ed Gallagher, a former football player from the United States who became an anti-homophobia activist after a suicide attempt motivated by his inner conflict over his sexuality left him paraplegic, and Jim Buzinski, a cofounder of the LGBT sports organization Outsports. Outsports would later name the episode one of the 100 most important moments in LGBT sports history.

Other episodes of the series included interviews with sports figures such as Wayne Gretzky, Chris Bosh and Perdita Felicien, often going beyond their sports careers to talk about issues of personal interest.

It was announced on March 26, 2009, that the program would be canceled at the end of the 2008–09 season.
