= Shelagh Rogers =

Canadian broadcaster

Shelagh Rogers OC

16th Chancellor of Queen's University at Kingston
- Incumbent
- Assumed office July 1, 2024
- Principal: Patrick Deane
- Preceded by: Murray Sinclair

Chancellor of the University of Victoria
- In office January 1, 2015 – December 31, 2021
- Preceded by: Murray Farmer
- Succeeded by: Marion Buller

Personal details
- Education: Queen's University (BA)
- Profession: Broadcast-journalist

Shelagh Rogers, OC, is a Canadian broadcast journalist. She is the current chancellor of Queen's University at Kingston. She was previously also the host and producer of CBC Radio One's The Next Chapter, and the former chancellor of the University of Victoria.

== Background ==
Rogers grew up in Ottawa, Ontario. Rogers began in broadcasting at CFRC, the campus radio station of Queen's University. She also worked at Kingston, Ontario's CKWS, hosting a country music program while still a student at Queen's. She later went on to produce a daily current affairs TV show and served as the station's late-night weather presenter.

Rogers graduated from Queen's University's arts program (B.A., art history) in 1977.

Rogers is a member of the Métis Nation of Greater Victoria, a chartered community of the Métis Nation British Columbia.

== CBC Radio ==
In 1980, she joined CBC Radio in Ottawa, hosting local current affairs programs and jazz and classical music broadcasts. In 1982, she became host of the national classical concert program Mostly Music.

In 1984, she moved to CBC Toronto. In addition to hosting local programs, she became a frequent contributor to many national shows, including Morningside, The Max Ferguson Show and Basic Black. She was also the founding host of The Arts Tonight.

She became a frequent guest host of Morningside, and in 1995 the program's host, Peter Gzowski, named Rogers the show's permanent guest host.

In 1997, Rogers moved to CBC Radio Two as host of Take Five. During this time, Rogers was also a contributor to TVOntario's book program, Imprint, and host of Saturday Night at the Movies.

In 2000, Rogers returned to Radio One as host of This Morning, which she hosted for two years. In 2002, she became host of Sounds Like Canada.

Rogers left Sounds Like Canada at the end of May 2008. She then became the host and a producer of The Next Chapter, an award-winning weekly show about writers and writing in Canada. On May 13, 2023, she announced that her final episode as host of The Next Chapter will air on June 24, 2023.

In June 2011, she was inducted as an honorary witness for the Truth and Reconciliation Commission of Canada.

Also in 2011, she was named an Officer of the Order of Canada "for her contributions as a promoter of Canadian culture, and for her volunteer work in the fields of mental health and literacy." Her Order of Canada citation reads: "Shelagh Rogers is a passionate journalist, activist and promoter of all things Canadian. A nationally renowned radio broadcaster, she is best known for hosting the CBC's "This Morning" and "Sounds Like Canada." Also highly regarded for her advocacy work, she has spoken out to help destigmatize mental illness, and has raised awareness and funds for adult literacy initiatives. She now champions reconciliation between Aboriginal and non-Aboriginal people as an honorary witness to the Truth and Reconciliation Commission of Canada."

Rogers is the co-editor of Speaking My Truth: Reflections on Reconciliation and Residential School (2012), Reconciliation and the Way Forward (2014) and Speaking My Truth: A Journey to Reconciliation (2018).

In May 2023, Rogers announced her retirement from CBC Radio, effective June 24.

== Chancellorship at the University of Victoria ==
She was appointed Chancellor of the University of Victoria for a 3-year term beginning January 1, 2015, and was officially sworn into the position on June 8, 2015.

In 2018, she was renewed for a second term.

Marion Buller succeeded her as chancellor as of January 1, 2022.

== Awards and accolades ==
- Rogers won an ACTRA Award in 1983 for Best Host/Interviewer.
- In 1997, she was named Companion of Frontier College for her significant contribution to the cause of literacy.
- In 2000, she was awarded the John Drainie Award for making a significant contribution to broadcasting in Canada.
- In 2002, she received an Honorary Doctor of Laws from the University of Western Ontario.
- She received the New Brunswick Literacy Award for continuing the legacy of Peter Gzowski in 2002.
- Also in 2002, she was named ADSUM House Successful Canadian Woman of the Year.
- She received a Transforming Lives Award from CAM-H in 2008.
- In 2008, Rogers received a special Peter Gzowski Literacy Award of Merit, the Distinguished Body of Work Award, for her outstanding contributions to literacy.
- In 2008, she was awarded The Canadian Foundation for Women's Health Award for Journalism in Women's Health.
- Also in 2008, she received a Champions of Mental Health Award (Media) from the Canadian Alliance on Mental Illness and Mental Health.
- In 2010, she received the Hero Award from the Mood Disorders Association of Ontario.
- Native Counselling Services of Alberta awarded her their Achievement in the Aboriginal Community award for her work on reconciliation.
- Rogers was the 2010 Mental Health Voices Award Recipient from the Canadian Mental Health Association BC Division.
- She was also named Ambassador at Large for the Canadian Canoe Museum in 2010.
- In 2011, she received an Honorary Doctor of Laws from Mount Allison University.
- In 2011, she was named an Officer of the Order of Canada.
- In 2012, she received an Honorary Doctor of Laws from Memorial University.
- In 2012, she was the Bronze Radio Winner for the documentary North Words from the New York Festivals Best Radio Programs Awards.
- In 2013, she received an Honorary Doctor of Education from Nipissing University.
- In 2014, she was the Bronze Radio Winner for "Alice's Nobel" from the New York Festivals Best Radio Programs Awards.
- In 2014, she was presented with the Queen’s University Alumni Humanitarian Award.
- In 2014, she received an Honorary Doctor of Letters from Vancouver Island University.
- The Canadian Publisher’s Association named her an Honorary Publisher in 2014.
- In 2015, the Writers at Woody Point festival named its venue after Rogers, who has been a long-time host of the event.
- The Ontario Writers’ Conference 2015 Cornerstone Award was won by Rogers and her long-time producer, Jacqueline Kirk.
- In 2016, she received the inaugural Margaret Trudeau Award for Mental Health Advocacy.
- She was recognized as a Paul Harris Fellow by The Rotary Foundation of Rotary International in 2016.
- She has been named an honorary member of the League of Canadian Poets.
- She was, for many years, the Honorary PGI National Chair for the Peter Gzowski initiatives for literacy.
- In 2017, she received an Honorary Doctor of Literature from Carleton University.
- In 2019, she received one of the inaugural Library and Archives Canada Scholars Awards, recognizing the outstanding contribution of individuals who have dedicated their lives to the creation and promotion of the country’s literary and historical heritage.
- In 2019, she received an Honorary Doctor of Laws from Queen's University.
- Also in 2019, she received an Honorary Doctor of Letters from the University of Manitoba.
