= Rewind (radio program) =

Rewind was a Canadian radio program broadcast by CBC Radio One from 2009 to 2019.

Hosted by Michael Enright, the series presented archived recordings of CBC Radio's history. Rewind was created and produced by Marieke Meyer.

This program should not be confused with the American public radio series of the same name, or the Irish radio programme Rewind, which is broadcast on Highland Radio and hosted by Rory Farrell.
