= Mary Lou Finlay =

Canadian radio and television journalist

Mary Lou Finlay (born 1947) is a Canadian radio and television journalist, best known for hosting various programs on CBC Radio and CBC Television.

== Education ==
Finlay graduated from the University of Ottawa in 1967 with a BA in English and French literature. For three years she did writing and researching for the Canadian War Museum before her leap to journalism when she began hosting a CBC Ottawa television magazine.

== Career in broadcasting ==
In 1975, Finlay moved to Toronto to co-host CBC Television's Take 30. She hosted her own program, Finlay and Company, in 1976 and 1977 and developed a loyal following. In 1978 she moved to CTV to co-host and produce the award-winning Live It Up!.

In 1981 she became co-host with Barbara Frum of CBC Television's nightly current affairs program, The Journal. After the program's first year, Frum remained as sole host and Finlay became a documentary reporter, remaining with the program until 1988. In that year she became host of CBC Radio's current affairs program Sunday Morning, where she remained until the spring of 1994. From 1994 to 1997, she hosted Now The Details, CBC Radio's weekly media watchdog program.

Finlay became co-host with Barbara Budd of As It Happens on September 1, 1997, having to cover the death of Diana, Princess of Wales on her first day. She retired following her last appearance on November 30, 2005, which was a tribute show for Finlay celebrating her years with the CBC.

In 2008, she released The As It Happens Files: Radio That May Contain Nuts (Knopf Canada), a book of reminiscences of her time on the show.

She was a pilot, and flew small planes, as she revealed in an on-air interview with test pilot Chuck Yeager on As It Happens.

Finlay is now a fellow with the Centre for the Study of Democracy at Queen's University in Kingston, Ontario.

== Awards ==
- Martin Goodman Nieman Fellowship at Harvard University.
- LL.D (hon), Dalhousie University.
- Meritas Tabaret award, University of Ottawa.
