= Matthew E. Hawco =

Newfoundland engineer and politician

Matthew E. Hawco (1882 – May 18, 1962) was an engineer, magistrate and politician in Newfoundland. He represented Harbour Main in the Newfoundland House of Assembly from 1923 to 1924.

He was born in Holyrood and was educated there and in Superior, Wisconsin. He apprenticed as an engineer at the shipbuilding plant in Superior, Wisconsin. In 1905, he received his certificate as Chief Engineer from the Wisconsin State examiners. Afterwards, he became chief of harbour construction on the Great Lakes. From 1913 to 1918, he worked for the Government of Canada on the Great Lakes. Hawco returned to Newfoundland in 1918, becoming a marine superintendent for the Newfoundland government.

He was elected to the Newfoundland assembly in 1923 and was named Minister of Posts and Telegraphs in the cabinet. Hawco resigned from cabinet in May 1924 which led to the collapse of William Warren's government. He was subsequently named to Albert Hickman's cabinet as Minister of Posts and Telegraphs. He lost a bid for reelection to the assembly in 1924 after he was unable to continue campaigning due to illness.

He was named a district magistrate at Holyrood in 1937.
