= Robin Brown (journalist) =

Canadian radio journalist

Robin Brown is a Canadian radio journalist. Best known as host of the series The Inside Track on CBC Radio One, she was more recently heard as a fill-in host on various programs for the network and its Toronto station CBLA. Brown is currently the producer of Windsor Morning, CBC Radio One's local morning program in Windsor.

She is the daughter of Harry Brown, a noted CBC Radio personality in the 1960s and 1970s. She is also a cousin of the morning show host at CBC Radio Thunder Bay, Lisa Laco.
