= Otto Lowy =

Canadian radio host (1921–2002)

Otto Lowy (1921 – May 29, 2002) was the host of CBC Radio 2's The Transcontinental for 22 years until his death. The program was introduced each week as a "musical train ride through Europe".

Lowy was born in Prague, Czechoslovakia, to an assimilated Jewish family and was the only member of his immediate family to survive World War II as he fled the country three days before Germany invaded. In England he worked as a member of the ground crew for the Czech Air Force squadron of the RAF. In 1948, he settled in Vancouver, British Columbia, and began his career with CBC Radio, initially as an actor in the series Adventures in Europe. He went on to write radio plays, make documentaries as well as act in dramas and comedies.

He was one of the founders of Vancouver's Arts Club Theatre in 1964.

A 1987 CBC Man Alive documentary short, Journey to Prague, follows Lowy on a trip to Prague in search of what happened to his family in the Holocaust.
