= Maureen Taylor =

Maureen Taylor is a Canadian television and radio personality. She graduated from Ryerson Polytechnical Institute in 1983, with a degree in journalism. Taylor first worked for the CBC as a reporter based in Windsor, Ontario. She also worked in CBC Television and CBC Radio in Ottawa, Toronto and Regina, Saskatchewan. She has won ACTRA and Canadian Nurses Association awards. Taylor received a Gemini Award nomination for her reporting work on CBC News The National. She is the former host of TVOntario's More to Life.

== Personal life ==
Taylor has two children, and was married to the late Dr. Donald Low, microbiologist with Mount Sinai Hospital, Toronto. She is currently working as a physician assistant, having gone back to school at McMaster University after her career in journalism.
