= This Country in the Morning =

Canadian radio program

This Country in the Morning was a nationally broadcast Canadian radio program, which aired on CBC Radio from 1971 to June 27, 1975. Peter Gzowski was the host from 1971 to 1974.

== After the show ==
During the summer of 1975, the show was replaced by a program called Sunny Days.

On September 30, 1975, Judy LaMarsh hosted her own show in the same time slot 9 am to noon daily, called Judy until April 9, 1976.

During the summer of 1976, the show was replaced by a program called This Morning with different hosts such as Allan McFee, Hana Gartner, John O'Leary and Laurier LaPierre.

On September 20, 1976, the program was renamed Morningside, hosted by Don Harron.

After hosting 90 Minutes Live on CBC Television, Peter Gzowski returned to CBC radio as full-time host of Morningside on September 6, 1982.

== Hosts ==
- Peter Gzowski (1971–1975)
- Michael Enright (1974/75 season)
- Judy LaMarsh (1974–1975) guest host.
