= More to Life (TV series) =

Canadian daily television series

More to Life (a.k.a. More 2 Life) was a daily afternoon television show produced and broadcast by TVOntario. The show first premiered in 1997. The first host was Maureen Taylor. In the final years, it was hosted by Mary Ito, while Karen Horsman substituted on some occasions.

The final episode of More to Life aired on Friday, June 30, 2006.

On June 29, 2006, the Ontario government announced that TVOntario would be undergoing a major overhaul. Amongst the shows to be cancelled were Studio 2, VOX, and More To Life.
