= CBNT-DT =

Television station in St. John's, Newfoundland and Labrador

- St. John's, Newfoundland and Labrador; Canada
- Channels: Digital: 8 (VHF); Virtual: 8
- Branding: CBC Newfoundland and Labrador, CBC Here & Now

Programming
- Affiliations: 8.1: CBC Television

Ownership
- Owner: Canadian Broadcasting Corporation
- Sister stations: CBN, CBN-FM, CBAFT-DT

History
- First air date: October 1, 1964
- Former call signs: CBNT (1964–2011)
- Former channel numbers: Analog: 8 (VHF, 1964–2011)
- Call sign meaning: CBC Newfoundland Television

Technical information
- Licensing authority: CRTC
- ERP: 14.54 kW
- HAAT: 252.9 m (830 ft)
- Transmitter coordinates: 47°31′59″N 52°47′26″W

Links
- Website: cbc.ca/news/canada/newfoundland-labrador

CBNT-DT (channel 8) is a television station in St. John's, Newfoundland and Labrador, Canada, broadcasting the English-language service of CBC Television. Owned and operated by the Canadian Broadcasting Corporation, the station maintains studios on University Avenue, and its transmitter is located south-southwest of George's Pond in St. John's.

== History ==
The station went on the air on October 1, 1964, as the previous CBC affiliate CJON-TV (then on channel 6, now an independent station on channel 21) switched networks to CTV. CBNT originally broadcast from the Browning Harvey Building on Water Street West in downtown St. John's. It was the second television station to sign on in the Metro Area (CJON, the previous CBC affiliate, was the first to open just nine years earlier in 1955). In 1966, the present television building, located on University Avenue, opened.

On April 30, 2007, CBC Radio's operations out of the old Avalon Telephone building on 342 Duckworth Street in downtown St. John's were moved to the television station's building on University Avenue after renovations to accommodate the radio broadcasts were completed.

== Programming ==
The station generally adheres to the Atlantic Time Zone feed of the CBC network schedule; as a result, most CBC programs air a half-hour later in Newfoundland, which is in the Newfoundland Time Zone, compared to other areas of Canada.

Until September 2009, to accommodate Here & Now's 6 p.m. timeslot, the network provided a separate Newfoundland Time feed of its weekday afternoon schedule between 4 and 6 p.m. local time. The 7 p.m. NT timeslot was then taken by Land and Sea (Monday) and repeats of Living Newfoundland and Labrador (Tuesday–Friday). As a result, the network program that normally aired at 3:30 p.m. local time (such as the Great Canadian Food Show) was preempted entirely. With few exceptions, this separate feed ended when Here & Now expanded to 90 minutes in September 2009. In late 2015, Here & Now returned to 60 minutes.

As CBNT's master control operations are now handled directly from the CBC's facilities in Toronto, there isn't any remaining direct technical obstacle to the station carrying a full Newfoundland Time schedule. However, given the added difficulty of coordinating such a schedule with live national news or sports broadcasts (for example The National and Hockey Night in Canada), as well as viewer familiarity with the current scheduling practices across all channels, such a switch is not likely in the near future.

=== Local programming ===
Current non-news local programming on CBNT includes Land and Sea, a regional documentary series in production since 1964, making it likely one of the longest-running television shows in Newfoundland and Labrador. Land and Sea is currently aired on Sundays at 11:30 a.m. On January 15, 2007, CBNT premiered a new local program, Living Newfoundland and Labrador; it aired at 3:30 p.m., and was repeated Tuesday to Friday at 7 p.m.. Living Newfoundland and Labrador was cancelled in August 2009.

From 1984 to 2011, CBNT was the home of the annual Janeway Children's Miracle Network Telethon, which usually airs the weekend following the U.S. Memorial Day holiday. Up until the early 1990s, the telethon was produced in cooperation with Avalon Cablevision Cable 9 (now Rogers TV). It was taped at the Avalon Cablevision studio, using CBC personalities, and Cable 9 volunteers. The Cable 9 feed was simulcast on CBC stations across the province, until the rebranding of Avalon Cablevision Ltd. to Cable Atlantic. At that time, the Cable Atlantic offices and studio underwent major renovations. CBNT then started using their own studio facilities. This telethon moved to CJON-TV in 2012.

Other CBC programs previously produced in Newfoundland and Labrador include Reach for the Top, which was hosted by Bob Cole for many years, then later by Art Andrews and Peter Miller; As Loved Our Fathers, written by Tom Cahill; Soundings; Yarns from Pigeon Inlet, a television adaptations of stories written by Ted Russell; Skipper and Company, which featured Ray Bellew; Where Once They Stood, a community profile series; Yesterday's Heroes; the 1997 five-part series East of Canada: The Story of Newfoundland; the Ryan's Fancy show; and from 1982 until the late 1990s with a brief gap in the middle of the decade, Newsfinal (CBC's local late night news show, anchored at times by Deborah Collins, Karl Wells, Glenn Tilley, etc.).

=== News operation ===
CBNT presently broadcasts 10 hours, 5 minutes of locally produced newscasts each week (with two hours each weekday, a half-hour news and On Point current affairs program Saturdays, and a half hour of news on Sundays).

When CBNT first signed on, its local newscast was known as CBC Regional News. In the mid-1970s, it adopted the Here & Now name. Here & Now was the name of the newscast for decades prior to 2000, when CBC budget cuts forced it to be cut to a half hour from an hour and integrated into Canada Now.

CBNT restored its old newscast in late 2005. Here & Now currently airs from 6 to 7 p.m.

==== Notable current on-air staff ====
- Vik Adhopia – national radio reporter

==== Notable former on-air staff ====
- David Cochrane
- Bill Gillespie
- Michael Harris (Here & Now, 1978)
- Rick MacInnes-Rae (reporter)
- Rex Murphy
- Fergus O'Byrne (The Ryan's Fancy Show)
- Dermot O'Reilly (The Ryan's Fancy Show)
- Wonderful Grand Band

== Technical information ==
Subchannel of CBNT-DT
Channel	Res.	Short name	Programming
8.1	720p	CBNT-DT	CBC Television

=== Analog-to-digital conversion ===
On August 31, 2011, the date on which Canadian television stations in CRTC-designated mandatory markets transitioned from analog to digital broadcasts, the station's digital signal relocated from channel to VHF channel 8.

=== Transmitters ===
CBNT had a very large system of 89 rebroadcast transmitters, spread throughout the province of Newfoundland and Labrador. Due to federal funding reductions to the CBC, in April 2012, the CBC responded with substantial budget cuts, which included shutting down CBC's and Radio-Canada's remaining analog transmitters on July 31, 2012. None of CBC or Radio-Canada's television rebroadcasters were converted to digital. This left the St. John's area as the only part of the province with over-the-air coverage from CBC. However, few Newfoundlanders lost access to CBC programming due to the high penetration of cable and satellite.

As a result of the closedown, some of EastLink's cable systems in the Great Northern Peninsula replaced CBNT with CBHT-DT from Halifax, due to what EastLink claimed were "technical issues" involving CBNT. Furthermore, in most of these affected communities, high-speed broadband internet, which could be used to watch regional programming from CBNT online, is not available.

== See also ==
- List of CBC television stations
