= The Sunday Edition (CBC Radio) =

- Genre: news magazine/talk show
- Country of origin: Canada
- Home station: CBC Radio
- Hosted by: Michael Enright
- Recording studio: Toronto, Ontario
- Original release: 2000 – September 6, 2020

The Sunday Edition was a Sunday morning radio show on CBC Radio One, hosted by Michael Enright. As the title might imply, the program was originally simply the Sunday edition of This Morning, which Enright co-hosted until the Sunday program became a separate entity in 2000.

Its subject matter was wide ranging with current affairs, arts reporting, radio documentaries, and interviews. It was often quite sombre and serious in tone. However, The Sunday Edition is also listed among the 100 best April Fool's jokes of all time for its fake interview with Jimmy Carter on April 1, 2001. The interview, which presented Carter as a "washed up peanut farmer" but seemingly neglected to mention his status as a former President of the United States, even fooled The Globe and Mail, which reported the interview as fact on its front pages. Toronto comedian Ray Landry played the role of Carter.

According to the CBC website for the program, "One of the most popular features ever aired" was a series first broadcast in 2009 called 20 Pieces of Music That Changed The World which featured discussions with music journalist Robert Harris who asserted that the works he selected were not only popular or unique or important within their genres but that they also significantly impacted the wider culture and thus "changed the world". Pieces of music discussed in the twenty episodes include works by Elvis Presley, Giovanni Battista Pergolesi, Enrico Caruso, Bob Dylan, Ludwig van Beethoven, Louis Armstrong, Bob Marley, Public Enemy, Gloria Gaynor, Richard Wagner, The Beatles, Igor Stravinsky, The Carter Family, Charlie Parker and Camille Saint Saens. The series had also been released as an audiobook.

The program was considered a ratings hit with 1.1 million people listening to at least part of the show in a typical week.

An abbreviated edition of the program was repeated at midnight on Sunday nights, with the title, The Sunday Edition: Round Midnight.

Beginning in the fall of 2014, the program was cut from three hours in length to two, with the 11 am to noon slot being taken over by The 180, a current affairs show based in Western Canada. In 2017, following the cancellation of The 180, the program returned to three hours in length.

In May 2020, Enright announced that he would retire from the program effective June 28, to host a new one-hour weekly program for the CBC.

An abbreviated 75-minute version of The Sunday Edition aired through the summer, presented by guest hosts such as Kevin Sylvester, Laurie Brown, Anthony Germain and Elamin Abdelmahmoud, which featured repeats of earlier interviews and segments and some new material. The last programme aired on September 6, 2020.

Piya Chattopadhyay subsequently launched a new two-hour Sunday morning programme, The Sunday Magazine, which includes in-depth interviews and documentaries, on September 13, 2020.

== See also ==
- Sunday Morning, a similar programme that aired on CBC Radio in the same timeslot from 1976 to 1997.
