= Avril Benoit =

Canadian humanitarian

Avril Benoît
- Born: Ottawa
- Citizenship: Canadian
- Education: University of Toronto, Cape Breton University
- Occupations: Humanitarian, journalist, broadcaster
- Employer(s): Canadian Broadcasting Corporation, Médecins Sans Frontières
- Television: Here and Now (Toronto)
- Family: Pierre Benoit (uncle)

Avril Benoît is a Canadian nonprofit executive and humanitarian.

She is a former journalist and broadcaster who worked as a radio host and documentary producer for the Canadian Broadcasting Corporation. Benoît has worked in operational and senior leadership roles at Médecins Sans Frontières, and is the CEO of Doctors Without Borders USA.

== Early life, family, and education ==
Benoît was born in Ottawa and has lived in Toronto, Montreal, and New York City.

She has two children and is the niece of former Ottawa Mayor Pierre Benoit.

In 2004-2005, Benoît was a Southam Journalism Fellow at Massey College, University of Toronto. Her research focussed on human rights, global governance and official development assistance. She has a Masters of Business Administration in community economic development from Cape Breton University.

== Career ==
Benoît's journalism career started at an AM country music radio station in rural Ontario. She has been an editor of The Record newspaper in Sherbrooke and worked as a freelance. Her reporting covered the 1990–91 Haitian general election and appeared in The Globe and Mail newspaper.

Benoît worked for the Canadian Broadcasting Corporation (CBC) as a documentary producer and radio host. Her CBC career television broadcasting in Montreal in 1996 and worked on This Morning radio program in 1997. Between 1999 and 2004, Benoît hosted and produced Here and Now and CBC Radio One's newsmagazine weekday afternoons on CBC Radio One in Toronto.

In 2006, Benoît became the communications director for Médecins Sans Frontières Canada, before working as the director of communications and development for the organization's Swiss headquarters. In 2019, she became the CEO of Doctors Without Borders/Médecins Sans Frontières in the United States (MSF-USA). Benoît worked in the humanitarian response to the 2010 Haiti earthquake, and was a senior leader of the organization's humanitarian work in Mauritania, South Sudan, South Africa, Ukraine, Sudan, Chad, and the Democratic Republic of Congo.

In 2024, Benoît described the United States' repeated vetoing of ceasefire proposals at the United Nations Security Council as "unconscionable." In 2025, Benoît announced her impending departure from MSF-USA, noting that she had reached the six-year term limit of the organization. In September 2025, MSF-USA announced that Benoît would be replaced by Tirana Hassan.
