= Ian Brown (journalist) =

Canadian journalist and author

Ian Brown (born 1954 in Lachine, Quebec) is a Canadian journalist and author, winner of several national magazine and newspaper awards.

Brown is a former host of Human Edge and The View from Here on TVOntario, and has hosted programming for CBC Radio One, including Later the Same Day, Talking Books, and Sunday Morning.

He has also worked as a business writer at Maclean's and the Financial Post, a feature reporter for The Globe and Mail, and a freelance journalist for other magazines including Saturday Night. He is an occasional contributor to the American public radio program This American Life.

Ian Brown was the editor of What I Meant to Say: The Private Lives of Men a 2006 collection of twenty-nine essays by prominent Canadian writers, including Greg Hollingshead, David Macfarlane, Don Gillmor, Bert Archer, and Brown himself, who asked his contributors to write on subjects that they'd like to discuss with women but had never been able to.

Ian Brown has also published four books, including Freewheeling (1989) about the Billes family, owners of Canadian Tire, and Man Overboard. The Boy in the Moon: A Father's Search for His Disabled Son., a book-length version of Brown's series of Globe and Mail features dealing with his son Walker's rare genetic disorder, Cardiofaciocutaneous Syndrome (CFC), was published in the fall of 2009.

Brown published Sixty: The Beginning of the End, or the End of the Beginning? A Diary of My Sixty-First Year in 2015. Brown began keeping a diary with a Facebook post on the morning of February 4, 2014, his sixtieth birthday. As well as keeping a running tally on how he survived the year, Brown explored what being sixty means physically, psychologically and intellectually. Seventy: A Diary of My Seventy-First Year followed in August 2026.

In January 2010, Ian Brown won British Columbia's National Award for Canadian Non-Fiction for his book The Boy in the Moon: A Father's Search for His Disabled Son. The award is Canada's richest non-fiction prize and offers the winner a $40,000 prize. In February, 2010, the book won the Charles Taylor Prize, a $25,000 prize which recognizes excellence in literary non-fiction.

Brown is married to Globe and Mail film critic Johanna Schneller.

== Bibliography ==
=== Non-fiction ===
- Freewheeling: The Feuds, Broods, and Outrageous Fortunes of the Billes Family and Canada's Favorite Company (1989)
- Man Overboard: True adventures with North American Men (1993)
- What I Meant to Say: The Private Lives of Men (editor) (2006)
- The Boy in the Moon: A Father's Search for His Disabled Son (2009)
- Sixty: The Beginning of the End, or the End of the Beginning? A Diary of My Sixty-First Year (2015)
- Seventy: A Diary of My Seventy-First Year (2026)
