= 15th ACTRA Awards =

Canadian television awards ceremony

- Date: April 2, 1986
- Hosted by: Don Harron, Pierre Berton, Barbara Frum, Gordon Pinsent, Dave Broadfoot, Ann Mortifee

Highlights
- Best TV Program: Charlie Grant's War
- Best Radio Program: Glenn Gould: The Well-Tempered Polymath

Television/radio coverage
- Network: CBC Television

The 15th ACTRA Awards were presented on April 2, 1986 to honour achievements in Canadian television production in 1985. They were the final ACTRA Awards presented before the responsibility for organizing and presenting Canadian television awards was transferred from ACTRA to the Academy of Canadian Cinema and Television; after this, ACTRA only presented awards in radio categories, until relaunching the ACTRA Awards program in the early 2000s as a series of regional production awards in various Canadian film and television production markets.

The ceremony was hosted by Don Harron, Pierre Berton, Barbara Frum, Gordon Pinsent, Dave Broadfoot and Ann Mortifee.

Due to overlapping eligibility periods, some of the nominees or winners at the 15th ACTRA Awards were also nominees or winners at the 1st Gemini Awards, which were presented in December 1986.

== Television ==
Best Television Program	Best Direction in a Television Program
Charlie Grant's War; Canada's Sweetheart: The Saga of Hal C. Banks; Final Offer	Donald Brittain, Canada's Sweetheart: The Saga of Hal C. Banks; Allan Kroeker, Tramp at the Door; Martin Lavut, Charlie Grant's War
Best Television Actor	Best Television Actress
Maury Chaykin, Canada's Sweetheart: The Saga of Hal C. Banks; Douglas Campbell, Tartuffe; Albert Millaire, The Celestial Bicycle; R. H. Thomson, Charlie Grant's War	Leueen Willoughby, The Other Kingdom; Megan Follows, Hockey Night; Patricia Phillips, Bayo
Best Continuing TV Performance	Best Supporting TV Performance
Martha Gibson, Seeing Things; Dinah Christie, Check It Out!; Louis Del Grande, Seeing Things	Douglas Rain, Love and Larceny; Peter Boretski, Charlie Grant's War; Jan Rubeš, Charlie Grant's War
Best TV Variety Performance	Best Television Host
Anne Murray, Sounds of London; Dave Broadfoot, Royal Canadian Air Farce; Murray McLauchlan, Floating Over Canada	Eric Malling, The Fifth Estate; Hana Gartner, The Fifth Estate; David Suzuki, A Planet for the Taking
Best Children's Television Program	Best Television Score
A Good Tree; The Cap; Hockey Night	Michael Conway Baker, A Planet for the Taking; Bruce Lee, Marionettes Inc.; Alex Pauk, Blackberry Subway Jam
Best Writing, Original Television Drama	Best Writing, Adapted Television Drama
Anna Sandor, Charlie Grant's War; Douglas Bowie, Love and Larceny; Donald Brittain and Richard Nielsen, Canada's Sweetheart: The Saga of Hal C. Banks	Ed Thomason, Gentle Sinners; John MacLachlan Gray, The King of Friday Night; Allan Kroeker, Tramp at the Door
Best Writing, Television Comedy/Variety	Best Writing, Television Public Affairs
Peter Thurling, Floating Over Canada; Rod Coneybeare and Wilson Coneybeare, Check It Out!; Suzette Couture and Chas Lawther, Joined at the Hip	Eric Malling and Brian McKenna, The Fifth Estate; Terence McKenna, The Journal; Vincent Tovell and Eric Till, Glenn Gould: A Portrait

== Radio ==
Best Radio Program	Best Radio Host
Glenn Gould: The Well-Tempered Polymath; A Celebration of Genius: The 300th Anniversary of Johann Sebastian Bach; Ideas: "Journey Through the Volcano"; Scales of Justice: "I'm Not Living Like This Anymore"	Vicki Gabereau, Gabereau: "Interview with Margaret Atwood"; Elizabeth Gray, As It Happens; Peter Gzowski, Morningside
Best Radio Actor	Best Radio Actress
Bill Meilen, The Legend of Old Charlie; John Colicos, Hanging Judge; Sean Mulcahy, Philadelphia Here I Come	Lenore Zann, Salt-Water Moon; Jackie Burroughs, Miranda; Nicky Guadagni, Scales of Justice: "I'm Not Living Like This Anymore"
Best Radio Variety Performance	Best Writing, Original Radio Drama
Édith Butler, Arts National; Len Carlson, Gay Claitman, Frank Daley, Cathy Gallant, Tim Hoey, Ray Landry and Paul K. Willis, If You Love This Government; Ann Mortifee, Arts National	Linda Zwicker, Grey Pearls; John Douglas, Attack of the Killer Mouse; Michael Tait, The Victims
Best Writing, Adapted Radio Drama	Best Writing, Radio Variety
Sean Mulcahy, Philadelphia Here I Come; Urjo Kareda, Salt-Water Moon; Bill Williams, Dragonwings	Roger Abbott, Dave Broadfoot, Don Ferguson, Gord Holtam, John Morgan and Rick Olsen, Royal Canadian Air Farce; Michael Boncoeur and Paul K. Willis, The Year of Living Obnoxiously; Andy Jones, Greg Malone, Tommy Sexton and Mary Walsh, Concepts
Best Writing, Radio Public Affairs
David Gollob, Ideas: "Journey Through the Volcano"; Fiona McHugh, One Mortal Woman; Christopher Thomas, This England

== Journalism and special awards ==
Gordon Sinclair Award	Best Live Television Reporting
Roy Bonisteel, Man Alive; Peter Gzowski and Stuart McLean, Morningside; Eric Malling, The Fifth Estate	Mike Duffy, 1985 Turkish embassy attack in Ottawa; Ruth Anderson and Dick Gordon, 1985 Alberta Progressive Conservative leadership convention; Peter Miller, 1985 Newfoundland general election
Foster Hewitt Award	John Drainie Award
Ernie Nairn; Rae Hull; Mark Lee	Bernard Cowan
