= 1st Gemini Awards =

1986 awards for Canadian television

- Date: December 4, 1986
- Location: Metro Toronto Convention Centre; Toronto, Ontario
- Hosted by: Eugene Levy, Andrea Martin, Dave Thomas

Highlights
- Best Drama Series: Night Heat
- Best Comedy Series: Seeing Things

Television/radio coverage
- Network: CBC Television

The 1st Gemini Awards were held in Toronto on 4 December 1986 to honour achievements in Canadian television. Gémeaux Award, the French version of the Gemini Awards were held for the first time this year as well. The 1985 television miniseries Anne of Green Gables was the most prominent winner.

English-language television coverage of the ceremonies was originally scheduled for broadcast on CBC Television, but labour disruptions at that network forced the telecast to move to a syndicated arrangement of private television stations including Toronto's Citytv. Unused cable channels in Montreal carried the broadcast in that city. The inaugural Gemini Awards were hosted by Second City Television performers Eugene Levy, Andrea Martin and Dave Thomas from the Metro Toronto Convention Centre.

The ceremony faced some criticism from filmmaker John Kastner on the grounds that its inaugural eligibility period overlapped with that of the final 15th ACTRA Awards earlier in the year, resulting in a few programs, most notably Donald Brittain's miniseries Canada's Sweetheart: The Saga of Hal C. Banks, having dual eligibility for both awards.

== Awards ==
=== Best Comedy Program or Series ===
- Seeing Things
- Four on the Floor
- Hangin' In

=== Best Documentary, Single Program or Series ===
- Glenn Gould: A Portrait, Parts 1 and 2
- 444 Days to Freedom: What Really Happened in Iran
- Karsh: The Searching Eye
- Making Overtures: The Story of a Community Orchestra

=== Best Dramatic Series ===
- Night Heat
- The Campbells
- Danger Bay

=== Best Dramatic Mini Series ===
- Anne of Green Gables
- Red Serge
- Spearfield's Daughter

=== Best TV Movie ===
- Love and Larceny
- The Execution of Raymond Graham
- Tramp at the Door

=== Best Short Drama ===
- Oakmount High
- The Exile
- In This Corner
- Undertow

=== Best Information Program or Series ===
- The Fifth Estate
- Canada AM
- The Journal
- Live It Up!
- Peter Ustinov's Russia

=== Best Children's Series ===
- Fraggle Rock
- OWL/TV
- Today's Special
- Wonderstruck

=== Best Writing in a Dramatic Program ===
- Donald Brittain and Richard Nielsen, Canada's Sweetheart: The Saga of Hal C. Banks
- Tim Dunphy and Peter Mohan, Night Heat
- Yan Moore, The Kids of Degrassi Street (episode "Griff Gets a Hand")
- Judith Thompson, Turning to Stone
- Pete White, Striker's Mountain

=== Best Writing in a Comedy or Variety Program or Series ===
- Seeing Things
- The Bestest Present
- The Canadian Conspiracy
- Toller Cranston's True Gift of Christmas

=== Best Direction in a Dramatic Series ===
- Donald Brittain, Canada's Sweetheart: The Saga of Hal C. Banks
- Mario Azzopardi, Night Heat
- Allan Kroeker, Tramp at the Door
- Kevin Sullivan, Anne of Green Gables
- Marc Voizard, Blue Line

=== Best Direction in a Comedy or Variety Program or Series ===
- Robert Boyd, The Canadian Conspiracy
- David Acomba, Toller Cranston's True Gift of Christmas
- Ron Meraska, The S and M Comic Book
- Peter Thurling, Floating Over Canada
- Eric Till, Fraggle Rock: "The Perfect Blue Rollie"

=== Best Direction in a Documentary Program or Series ===
- Larry Weinstein, Making Overtures: The Story of a Community Orchestra
- Les Harris, 444 Days to Freedom: What Really Happened in Iran

=== Best Performance by a Lead Actor in a Continuing Role in a Comedy Series ===
- Louis Del Grande, Seeing Things
- Don Adams, Check it Out
- David Eisner, Hangin' In

=== Best Performance by a Lead Actor in a Continuing Dramatic Series ===
- Robert Clothier, The Beachcombers
- Scott Hylands, Night Heat
- Malcolm Stoddard, The Campbells
- Jeff Wincott, Night Heat

=== Best Performance by a Lead Actor in a Single Dramatic Program or Miniseries ===
- August Schellenberg, The Prodigal
- Maury Chaykin, Canada's Sweetheart: The Saga of Hal C. Banks
- Jeff Fahey, The Execution of Raymond Graham
- Ed McNamara, The Prodigal
- Ed McNamara, Tramp at the Door

=== Best Performance by a Lead Actress in a Continuing Role in a Comedy Series ===
- Martha Gibson, Seeing Things
- Lally Cadeau, Hangin' In
- Janet-Laine Green, Seeing Things

=== Best Performance by a Lead Actress in a Continuing Dramatic Series ===
- Marnie McPhail, The Edison Twins
- Jennifer Dale, Night Heat
- Susan Walden, Danger Bay

=== Best Performance by a Lead Actress in a Single Dramatic Program or Miniseries ===
- Megan Follows, Anne of Green Gables
- Kim Braden, Spearfield's Daughter
- Nicky Guadagni, Turning to Stone
- Elizabeth Shepherd, The Cuckoo Bird

=== Best Performance by a Supporting Actor ===
- Richard Farnsworth, Anne of Green Gables
- Bernard Behrens, Turning to Stone
- Thomas Peacocke, Oakmount High
- Douglas Rain, Love and Larceny
- R. H. Thomson, Canada's Sweetheart: The Saga of Hal C. Banks

=== Best Performance by a Supporting Actress ===
- Colleen Dewhurst, Anne of Green Gables
- Anne Anglin, Turning to Stone
- Sharry Flett, The Suicide Murders
- Jackie Richardson, Turning to Stone

=== Best Performance by a Broadcast Journalist ===
- Eric Malling, The Fifth Estate
- Jim Reed, W-FIVE
- Joe Schlesinger, The National

=== Best Performance by a Host or Interviewer ===
- David Suzuki, The Nature of Things
- Linda MacLennan, Canada AM
- Bill Paul, Marketplace
- Valerie Pringle, Midday
- Peter Ustinov, Peter Ustinov's Russia

=== Best Photography in a Dramatic Program or Series ===
- Rene Ohashi, Anne of Green Gables
- Rene Ohashi, Philip Marlowe, Private Eye
- Ron Orieux, Tramp at the Door
- Andreas Poulsson, Canada's Sweetheart: The Saga of Hal C. Banks
- Vic Sarin, The Suicide Murders

=== Best Picture Editing in a Dramatic Program or Series ===
- Ralph Brunjes, Oakmount High
- Thomas Berner, Turning to Stone
- Lara Mazur, Tramp at the Door
- Mairin Wilkinson and James Lahti, Anne of Green Gables

=== TV Guide's Most Popular Program Award ===
- Anne of Green Gables

=== Earle Grey Award ===
- Ed McNamara
