= 27th Canadian Film Awards =

1976 film awards in Canada

- Date: October 21, 1976
- Location: CFTO-DT Studios, Scarborough
- Hosted by: Lorne Greene

Highlights
- Most nominations: Lies My Father Told Me; Volcano: An Inquiry into the Life and Death of Malcolm Lowry
- Best Motion Picture: Lies My Father Told Me

The 27th Canadian Film Awards were held on October 24, 1976 to honour achievements in Canadian film. The ceremony was hosted by Lorne Greene, and was held at the conclusion of the inaugural 1976 Festival of Festivals.

Due to ongoing issues with Quebec filmmakers, the CFA's receipt of its annual government grant was made contingent upon the reaching of a compromise by the two groups. It was eventually agreed that the two sides would take turns hosting the awards.

To shore up public support, there was an increased PR campaign and CTV aired a one-hour broadcast of the awards ceremony. After pre-selection, the total submissions to the jury were 171 films, including 17 features and 76 documentaries.

After much discussion about whether or not to add a commercial-value award, the CFAs introduced the Golden Reel Award, presented to the year's top-grossing Canadian film.

== Winners ==
=== Films ===
- Best Feature Film: Lies My Father Told Me — Pentimento Productions and Pentacle VIII Productions, Harry Gulkin and Anthony Bedrich producers, Ján Kadár director
- Best Theatrical Documentary: Ahô: The Forest People — Productions Via le Monde, François Floquet, Daniel Bertolino producers and directors
- Best Documentary: Volcano: An Inquiry into the Life and Death of Malcolm Lowry — National Film Board of Canada, Donald Brittain and Robert Duncan producers, Donald Brittain and John Kramer directors
- Best Theatrical Short: Cooperage — Rocky Mountain Films, Phillip Borsos producer and director
- Best Animated Short: The Street — National Film Board of Canada, Guy Glover producer, Caroline Leaf director
- Best Arts and Experimental: Barbara Is a Vision of Loveliness — Lightworks, R. Bruce Elder producer and director
- Best TV Drama: For Gentlemen Only — National Film Board of Canada, Vladimir Valenta producer, Michael Scott director

=== Feature Film Craft Awards ===
- Best Performance by a Lead Actor: André Melançon - Partis pour la gloire (Bound for Glory) (NFB)
- Best Performance by a Lead Actress: Marilyn Lightstone - Lies My Father Told Me
- Best Supporting Actor: Frank Moore - The Far Shore (Onyx Films)
- Best Supporting Actress: Tedde Moore - Second Wind (Olympic Films)
- Best Art Direction: Anne Pritchard - The Far Shore
- Best Cinematography: Richard Leiterman - The Far Shore
- Best Direction: Harvey Hart - Goldenrod (Film Funding International, Talent Associates)
- Best Film Editing: Donald Shebib - Second Wind (Olympic Films)
- Best Sound Editing: Maurice Schell - Lies My Father Told Me
- Best Music Score: Lewis Furey - La tête de Normande St-Onge (Normande) (Cinépix/Productions Carle-Lamy)
- Best Original Screenplay: Not awarded
- Best Adapted Screenplay: Ted Allan - Lies My Father Told Me
- Best Overall Sound: Henri Blondeau (recording), Richard Voriser and Stephen Dalby (re-recording) - Lies My Father Told Me

=== Non-Feature Craft Awards ===
- Performance by a Lead Actor: Ed McNamara and Hugh Webster - For Gentlemen Only (NFB)
- Performance by a Lead Actress: Luce Guilbeault - Bargain Basement (NFB)
- Supporting Actor or Actress: David Gardner - The Insurance Man from Ingersoll (CBC)
- Art Direction: Not awarded
- Cinematography: Robert Ryan - Killers of the Wild (Superstar International)
- Direction: Donald Brittain and John Kramer - Volcano: An Inquiry into the Life and Death of Malcolm Lowry
- Film Editing: John Kramer - Volcano: An Inquiry into the Life and Death of Malcolm Lowry
- Sound Editing: Les Halman and Abbey Jack Neidik - Volcano: An Inquiry into the Life and Death of Malcolm Lowry
- Music Score: Alain Clavier - Volcano: An Inquiry into the Life and Death of Malcolm Lowry
- Screenplay: David King - For Gentlemen Only
- Non-Dramatic Script: Donald Brittain and John Kramer - Volcano: An Inquiry into the Life and Death of Malcolm Lowry
- Sound Recording: Roland Martel and Carle Delaroche-Vernet - Ahô: The Forest People
- Sound Re-Recording: Joe Grimaldi and Austin Grimaldi - The Last Cause (Sandy McLeod Productions)

=== Special awards ===
- The Last Cause, Sandy McLeod Productions, William Brennan producer - "for its monumental compilation of historic footage".
- Dennis Zahoruk - for his first feature film, Brethren.
- Golden Reel Award: Lies My Father Told Me, Harry Gulkin and Anthony Bedrich producers, "for highest-grossing film".
- Wendy Michener Award: Caroline Leaf - "for her contribution to the art of animation" in The Street.
- John Grierson Award: Tom Daly - "for outstanding contributions to Canadian cinema".
