= Politics of Star Trek =

Politics of the American science fiction franchise

The politics of Star Trek have been widely discussed in the media and academia.

According to Stephen Benedict Dyson of the University of Connecticut, Star Trek: The Original Series was "often riven by sociopolitical strife, thinly veiled allegories of current Earth problems such as the Cold War, Vietnam, racism, inequality." Scholar Mike O’Connor has written that "among television programs of the late 1960s Star Trek was somewhat anomalous in tackling philosophical and political themes, and in doing so in a consistently liberal voice." Writing in The Atlantic, Robert Greene II has said that Star Trek " has, for 51 years, told plenty of stories about the political and social ills of American society. Deep Space Nine, which ran from 1993 to 1999, was no different... Deep Space Nine tackled subjects such as terrorism, imperialism, and the limits of democracy during crisis."

== Capitalism and socialism ==
Some commentators have argued that Star Trek represents a left-wing, post-capitalist ideal. Simon Tyrie of Tribune has argued that "Star Trek is an outlier in science fiction for offering an optimistic vision for humanity’s future. In fact, while it may be overly simplistic to say that Star Trek depicts a socialist society, its utopianism owes much to the ideas of Marx in that it imagines a future where collectivism triumphs, money is obsolete, and every material need is met." In Star Trek: Strange New Worlds, the Federation was described as a "no money, socialist utopia thing."

== Racism ==
According to Chris Gregory, "Star Trek has been informed by a multi-culturalist vision in which Martin Luther King’s famous ‘dream’ of complete racial integration has become a reality... With racial prejudice extinct on its ‘future-Earth’, Star Trek has always used conflict between the various alien races to present stories that reflect on contemporary racial conflicts." According to David Jesudason of the BBC, "when it comes to big film and TV franchises, few are as gratifyingly diverse these days as the Star Trek universe."

== International relations ==
According to Joel Campbell of Troy University, "the three Trek series of the 1990s developed more nuanced approaches to IR. Building on the neo-liberalism of The Undiscovered Country, TNG especially sought diplomatic and multilateral solutions to most problems, and suggested that military solutions should be last resorts."

=== Cold War ===
Some commentators have suggested that Star Trek: The Original Series represents a commentary on the Cold War. Academic Tom Nichols has argued that the Federation in the Original Series represents NATO, whereas the Klingons represent the Soviet Union, adding that "two Cold War themes run through Star Trek: the risks of great-power confrontation, and the danger of ultimate annihilation."

George A. Gonzalez of the University of Miami, however, has criticised interpretations of the Klingon-Federation conflict as an analogy for the Cold War, saying it is one of "two hugely flawed assumptions" about the series, the other being that the Federation represents a pro-American analogy, arguing that the series is not anti-communist and instead represents a critique of fascism and World War II.

=== Terrorism ===
Some commentators have argued that some Star Trek plots examine themes of terrorism.

TNG episode "The High Ground" was blocked from broadcasting in the UK and Ireland due to a scene in which the "Irish unification of 2024" is listed by Data during a debate over the use of violence to achieve political ends.
