= Patterson (radio series) =

UK radio program

- Genre: Radio situation comedy
- Running time: 30 minutes
- Country of origin: United Kingdom
- Home station: BBC Radio 3
- Starring: Lewis Fiander; Judy Parfitt; Richard Vernon; Maureen Lipman; John Barron; Richard O'Callaghan; Hugh Thomas; Maggie Steed; Leueen Willoughby; Jack May; Frances Jeater
- Written by: Malcolm Bradbury; Christopher Bigsby
- Produced by: Geoffrey Perkins
- Recording studio: Paris Studio, London
- Original release: 19 February – 9 April 1981
- No. of series: 1
- No. of episodes: 8
- Audio format: Stereo
- Opening theme: Jester's Jig by Gordon Giltrap

Patterson is a BBC Radio sitcom about a hapless university lecturer. It was billed as a comedy series in eight parts, written by Malcolm Bradbury and Christopher Bigsby but strictly speaking, it is a serial. The show was produced by Geoffrey Perkins and tells the tale of Doctor Andrew Patterson (Lewis Fiander) who is cajoled by his wife Jane (Judy Parfitt) into accepting a job in the dysfunctional English department of a provincial red-brick university. This is the catalyst for a catalogue of unfortunate events, which sees his life rapidly crumble around him, bit by bit.

Patterson is unusual amongst BBC Radio sitcoms in that it was originally broadcast on BBC Radio 3, and it appears to be the first ever sitcom broadcast on that station. Later examples include Broomhouse Reach (1984), Blood and Bruises (1988) and Such Rotten Luck (1989).

The series was repeated on the BBC World Service in 1986 and on BBC Radio 4 Extra in 2020.

== Characters ==
=== Main characters ===
Patterson (Lewis Fiander) A 34-year-old PhD and lecturer in English literature who is a well-meaning blunderer. He knows he has a book in him but thus far it has stayed there. He is experiencing something of a premature mid-life crisis and questions whether God really did intend him to be a university teacher. This is exacerbated by taking on a job in a university he regards as a "monstrosity" and which drove his predecessor to a nervous breakdown. On top of that, his marriage is under strain - he does not have the seven-year itch so much as the five-year psoriasis and his Catholic wife's dogmatic eschewing of contraception is a source of particular antagonism. He has a sharp wit, which helps him to just about survive the mishaps that continually befall him, partly through misfortune and partly naive misjudgement.

Jane (Judy Parfitt) Patterson's long-suffering wife of twelve years. Although she has seven mouths to feed, her culinary repertoire extends only from sausages to fish fingers. At first she regrets the move enforced by her husband's new job but by the end of the first episode, she has found reasons to change her mind, which puts the couple at odds. Jane's desire to do social work is also a bone of contention - her husband would prefer her to look after their own children first. With a BA in history, she is an intellectual match for her husband, which leads to some lively exchanges, but otherwise they do not seem ideally suited.

Professor Misty (Richard Vernon) The absent-minded head of the English department. He cannot even remember Patterson's name from one moment to the next. He is clearly overdue retirement and Patterson tells Jane he "looks as though he went to school with Little Dorrit." His speech is characterised by a tendency to trail off in mid-sentence as he loses his train of thought, so others often finish his sentences for him, inappropriately. He is frequently the bane of Patterson's life, issuing nonsensical edicts on which his job invariably depends.

Vice-Chancellor (John Barron) A middle-aged, pompous bombast with delusions of grandeur. He presides over the university of which he is unjustly proud.

Victor (Hugh Thomas) Patterson's old friend from college and fellow lecturer in English who is laid back and lacking in any sense of responsibility. Jane has no time for him as she regards him as a bad influence on her husband.

Amy Spade (Maggie Steed) Another member of the English department. She has an identity problem - last year, she was known as Felicity Scott. She is keen to get most of the male faculty into bed, but no one is interested. Nevertheless, she feels entitled to moralise about others, so she spends much of her time spying on people and then sending them anonymous poison pen letters assembled from words and phrases cut out of newspapers.

Melissa (Maureen Lipman) Another colleague, described by Victor as "honeypot of the senior common room, toast of the troops" and less politely by Amy as "that randy bitch!" She is a voracious man-eater who appears to have had designs on Patterson from the moment she learned he was joining the department. The attraction is clearly mutual - when she suggests to him during their first meeting that his home life must make for divided loyalties, he is pointedly quick to concur.

Mary (Francis Jeater) The loyal department secretary who has a propensity for steaming open people's mail and then telling them precise details of the contents as she hands it over, adding, "I didn't open it."

Cuthbertson (Richard O'Callaghan) Patterson's next-door neighbour who has also been newly recruited by the university as custodian of the issue desk of the library. He is a nerdy, obsessive health freak to whom Patterson takes an instant dislike, not least of all because he is clearly very taken with Jane.

Probity (Jack May) The university porter. A proud old man with a very affected manner of speaking - not only does he habitually drop his aitches but he also insists on inserting additional ones ahead of words beginning with vowels.

Mrs Vice-Chancellor (Irene Prador) The Vice-Chancellor's wife. She is a crashing bore who cannot resist telling everyone at every opportunity that she is Viennese and regaling them with tedious, long-winded anecdotes about her days as an opera singer.

Bannerji (Tariq Yunus) An Indian student who obtained his place at the university via the British Council. He is extremely keen to discuss the contemporary British novel, only Patterson's specialism is poetry so he keeps making excuses or avoiding him altogether.

Valerie (Leueen Willoughby) An American student on a year abroad who is rather voluble. However, unlike Banneerji, Patterson is only too keen to make time for her, principally because she is attractive, does not wear a bra, is sexually liberated and into older men.

=== Other characters ===
Lady Professor (Frances Jeater) One of the eccentric university interviewing committee in episode one.

Professor Amis (Richard O'Callaghan, uncredited) Another member of the interviewing committee.

Office cleaner (Uncredited) A woman who comes to Patterson's rescue in the first episode.

Sandra (Liza Hayden) One of Patterson's five children.

Cleaner (Maggie Steed) A sanitary systems supervisor who says she was happier when she was just a bog cleaner. She gives Patterson a shock in the second episode.

Solon (Hugh Thomas, uncredited) A student in Patterson's class in episode two.

Jake (Philip Davis) A cocky student who features in episode three.

Mrs Jackson (Francis Jeater) A busybody who is the Pattersons' other next door neighbour.

Librarian (Uncredited) A bone-idle colleague of Cuthbertson who 'assists' Patterson in episode four.

Mrs Misty (Francis Jeater) The Professor's wife who features briefly in episodes five and seven.

Inspector Firestone (David Tate) A policeman Patterson has a run in with in episode six.

Hotel Manager (Rowland Davies) Features in episode seven.

Ancient boy (Patrick Barr) The elderly porter at the hotel in episode seven.

Verity (Francis Jeater) An alcoholic cook who serves in the canteen in the final episode.

Landlady (Patricia Hayes) The landlady of Patterson's digs who appears in the pre-title sequence of the final episode.

== Structure ==
Patterson is a serial. It charts the fortunes of its central character over the course of one eventful academic term. Each episode begins with a pre-title sequence. This typically sees Patterson starting out on a new day, invariably in changed circumstances, which tend to get progressively worse. The episodes are written in such a way to end with a double-punchline. To realise this, the closing titles are interrupted by a brief payoff to the final scene, which mines another gag from the same situation. The end credits proper follow hard off the back of it. Episode four is the only one to depart from this model. An audible edit where the end credits begin suggests that a payoff was scripted but removed prior to transmission.

The above does not hold necessarily hold true for the abridged Radio 2 repeat because of editing.

== Plot ==
=== Episode one ===
Following a bizarre interview, Doctor Andrew Patterson reluctantly accepts a lectureship in English Literature at a provincial university. His wife Jane finds their new hometown so depressing she is reduced to tears. Their oddball, neighbour Spencer Cuthbertson calls round and makes an immediate, bad impression on Patterson. His spirits are lifted by the unexpected arrival of Victor, an old college friend who reveals they are colleagues. Jane is less than thrilled. Victor introduces Patterson to the other members of the department, all of whom appear to have notable quirks, and it is quite clear Melissa already has Andrew in her sights as a potential sexual conquest. There is mutual attraction. The head of the department, Professor Misty shows him to his new office and then absent-mindedly locks him in for several hours. Later, he suggests to Jane he should quit but she has now found unexpected virtues in her present circumstances and goes out for the evening with Cuthbertson, leaving Patterson to look after their five children.

=== Episode two ===
It is the first day of term. Jane says she has lined up an interview for a job as a social worker. Patterson thinks this is ironic as they have many children of their own that need looking after. When he gets to work, he expresses having high hopes for his first lecture but it does not go as planned. On entering Room 351, he is greeted by the sound of a flushing cistern - it transpires he is in the wrong building. Arriving late, he soon concludes his students are neither intelligent nor academically inclined. At a meeting of the department, Misty rails against falling standards and, in particular, fornication by faculty, which, he insists, must cease utterly. The Pattersons are invited to the Vice-Chancellor's reception where Melissa makes a beeline for Andrew. He is about to take up her offer of showing her "some fascinating Greek statuary in the garden" when he is inconveniently interrupted by Jane. Cuthbertson wanders over and suggests showing Jane the same statuary. The night ends in disaster after the Vice-Chancellor asks Patterson not to smoke and he hurriedly puts his lit cigarette in his jacket pocket. The suit catches fire and he has to jump in the lake to extinguish the flames.

=== Episode three ===
The Pattersons awake at 5.00am to the sounds of their children either crying or vomiting. Jane says she is taking the social worker's position. Misty asks Patterson to help Bannerji, an Indian student, with his thesis about a novel, despite his protests that he has never read it as poetry is his field. Misty also demands his lawnmower back which he allegedly borrowed last term. Patterson points out it couldn't have been him as he's only just started but Misty is adamant. It must be back by 9.00am tomorrow or he'll be fired. Over lunch, Andrew discovers Victor borrowed the lawnmower using the name of Thistleberry - Patterson's predecessor - but he passed it on to Amy who in turn gave it to Melissa. He agrees to a dinner date at her place as a means of getting the lawnmower back. The meal is somewhat awkward and sexually charged. When Patterson spills wine on his trousers, Melissa seizes her opportunity to bed him and enjoy "cock au vin". When he returns home after midnight, a row ensues and Jane kicks out her husband for his unfaithfulness.

=== Episode four ===
When Patterson wakes up at Victor's, somewhat confused, he is shocked to learn of his marriage split. Patterson returns the lawnmower, only for Misty to tell him he does not have one. He admits to borrowing one from a colleague once but then Victor went off with it under an assumed name. Patterson is also horrified to discover he is apparently giving an inaugural lecture on Lycidas the following evening in front the Vice-Chancellor and some important dignitaries. With no time to write anything and his job on the line once more, he is forced to plagiarise an essay by T.S. Eliot. He surmises that no one there will recognise it. Amy Spade has more bad news for Patterson - no sooner had he gone then Cuthbertson moved in with Jane. When he tells Melissa about his change of circumstances, she agrees to take him in but warns he "will have to sing for his supper." She also gives him a style makeover. Initially, he suffers stress-induced impotence but Melissa is persistent. Her constant demands take their toll and the following evening, Patterson falls asleep on the toilet before his lecture and cannot be roused. Probity, the university porter, delivers the speech in his place but reads out both the title and the original author of the photocopied essay to the assembled throng.

=== Episode five ===
Patterson begins writing a book, seemingly to avoid being in the bedroom with Melissa. She reads the manuscript and learns he has put aside his long-mooted volume on the dwarf in Shakespeare in favour of soft porn, written under the pseudonym of R.K. Misty. She also discovers the main protagonists of Naked and Magnificent are called Patterson and Melissa. She is annoyed, primarily, she says, because he is writing this vile stuff when he should be in the bedroom doing it. Mary tells him that Misty has delegated his midday class on the works of Lawrence to him but has neglected to specify, which Lawrence - D.H. or T.E. It is somewhat academic, as Cuthbertson won't allow him to borrow books on either. All the while, Bannerji keeps pestering him. Misty finally solves the mystery of the author - it turns out to be Lawrence Durrell and hands him a new protégée in the form of Valerie Candle, a nubile American writing a thesis on sex in John Donne. He invites the Pattersons to a dinner party. With his promotion prospects due to be discussed, Andrew is forced to do a deal with Jane, mending a fence in return for her company for the evening. At the party, the professor secretes Patterson into the broom closet and tells him he knows all about his book and demands to see it. Patterson is panicked until he realises Misty isn't referring to his erotic fiction but the Shakespeare book. Cuthbertson turns up unexpectedly, drunk and accusing Patterson of being an adulterer and a pervert, so Jane leaves to escort him home. Patterson and Valerie also leave early and she drives him back to her room.

=== Episode six ===
Patterson returns to Melissa's at 3.00am, drunk. She does not believe he spent the entire evening at Misty's. She is also suspicious when he is eager to get into work the following morning. She then reveals he talked in his sleep, apparently while dreaming of having sex with Valerie. Later in his office, Misty asks him to meet him in secret at midday and Valerie suggests going away for the weekend together, an offer which Patterson readily accepts. Misty turns up for the meeting in disguise. He reveals he is threatened by a coup led by Smithson in Linguistics and is considering rotating his job as head of department with Amy Spade. Patterson returns to Melissa's to find himself locked out and replaced by none other than Smithson. His reaction is to get drunk and depressed with Victor. In a state of intoxication, they head back to Patterson's house and break in. Victor finds a Luger in the drawer which Patterson fires by accident at another intruder. It turns out to a policeman, Inspector Firestone. Jane returns and gets the inspector to arrest the pair of them, along with Misty and Bannerji who turn up unexpectedly.

=== Episode seven ===
Patterson has no option but to live and sleep in his office. Ignoring the danger of dismissal for gross moral turpitude, he leaves with Valerie for a weekend away in Stratford-upon-Avon. Her driving leaves him fearing for his life. En route, he is also treated to an extremely full and convoluted monologue about Valerie's sexual experiences and hang-ups. As they arrive, she confesses to booking under the names of Professor and Mrs Misty, which makes Patterson laugh heartily. The hotel manager informs them they have a very special deal - the Much Ado About Nothing suite and the Elizabethan banquet. The elderly porter escorts them to their room. Patterson needs to go back to the car for something and to his horror, is spotted by the Vice-Chancellor. By coincidence, he is there with his wife, the real Professor and Mrs Misty and other senior staff for a meeting planning university cuts. They ask him to join them for the banquet. Patterson returns to Valerie, explains the situation, and pleads with her to stay put for the sake of his career. Over dinner, the Vice-Chancellor's wife takes a shine to him and wonders why he is filling a doggy-bag. When he eventually gets back to the room, Valerie is furious but he manages to placate her by telling her she turns him on. The mood is broken by the Vice-Chancellor's wife knocking at the door. Valerie angrily declares he will do anything to save his job, including sleeping with old ladies. They escape through the window but soon Valerie dumps him on the roadside. He is eventually rescued by Professor Misty. Unfortunately for Patterson, he has another passenger - Bannerji.

=== Episode eight ===
A few days later, on the last day of term, Valerie spots Patterson and calls out to him. There is evidently still fondness on both sides but Valerie reveals she is leaving to hitch round France over Christmas with Bannerji in tow. Patterson wishes them well. Mary informs him he has a letter from his wife's solicitor about a legal separation, adding that she didn't open it. She's also learned of his weekend away from Amy Spade and Patterson is worried she might have told Misty but she says he probably does not care now that he's retiring. Equally surprising is the revelation that Amy has declined to take over. The department is in severe difficulties due to the cuts, there are no promotion prospects for anyone, the faculty are at each other's throats, there are Marxist agitators everywhere and the professor is leaving the department in irremediable chaos. Misty opines only a fool would take over in those circumstances and for no additional pay whatsoever so he's handing the reins to Patterson. To make matters worse, Victor tells him Smithson has organised a sit-in and a motion to overthrow the capitalist system has been passed by a single vote. A deputation presents him with a list of non-negotiable demands. The Vice-Chancellor vetoes all of them except one: 'Fire Doctor Patterson.' Just then, the VC's wife bursts in to announce she is leaving him and running away with her lover, Professor Misty. Shortly after, the sit-in is over. A new head of department has been appointed and following a re-vote, the original motion defeated after Victor got Amy to switch sides by promising to take her on a Christmas holiday to Corfu. Victor also advises Patterson to try and patch things up with his wife. As midnight approaches, buoyed by Dutch courage, Patterson determines to follow his guidance. To avoid waking the neighbours and the children, Jane lets him in. Patterson makes a part flippant/part impassioned speech, displaying a degree of contrition, extolling his wife's virtues and affirming his love for her. Initially, Jane is unmoved. Cuthbertson comes to give moral support but after Patterson deals with him masterfully, his wife eventually agrees to a reconciliation. It is the eve of his 35th birthday.

== Influences ==
The clearest influence is the 1954 campus novel Lucky Jim by Kingsley Amis. At least four parallels can be drawn. The setting is a provincial red-brick university; the lead character is a well-meaning lecturer with a tendency to blunder; the head of department is an absent-minded, gauche pedant who frequently trails off in mid-sentence; and there is a comic set-piece where the eponymous hero is expected to give a public lecture, only for it to descend into embarrassing farce. This connection is even cheekily hinted at by direct references to both the novel and its author within the series' dialogue, which suggests Patterson is an homage. It also seems likely that Bradbury drew from his own experiences as a university lecturer in English.

== Production and broadcast ==
=== Background ===
Patterson was, at the time of its original broadcast, unique in being the only sitcom aired on BBC Radio 3. This had been not the original intention. It was commissioned by the BBC's Head of Light Entertainment Radio, David Hatch, for Radio 4 but subsequently, a decision was taken at senior level not to broadcast the series as it was deemed unsuitable for that station. The reasoning behind that is unclear. The series might never have been transmitted at all but for the intervention of then Controller of Radio 3, Ian McIntyre. Situation comedy was outside of his station's remit but he appreciated the quality of Patterson and did what was necessary behind the scenes to facilitate its groundbreaking broadcast.

The series was recorded at the BBC's Paris Studio. Given the lack of any necessity for an audience, this seems a curious choice, but it was not without precedent. Producer Geoffrey Perkins had previously used the studio for The Hitchhiker's Guide to the Galaxy, a series which similarly had no requirement of a laughter track.

There is evidence that the decision to proscribe any broadcast on Radio 4 was taken before production was complete since the majority of episodes overran their allotted 30 minute time slot on first broadcast. This would not have been permissible on Radio 4 and they would have required additional editing to shorten them before they could be aired. Radio 3 had more flexibility and thus listeners were able to enjoy recorded material that would otherwise have ended up on the cutting room floor.

Within three months of the conclusion of its initial airing, Patterson was afforded a repeat run on BBC Radio 2 in the 10.30pm slot, albeit only in mono and largely on Medium Wave. This station was also subject to stricter time constraints, which meant the episodes were now edited, as they would have been for Radio 4. Brief stings were inserted between the majority of scenes. As with the opening theme of the series, Jester's Jig, they were taken from the Gordon Giltrap album Peacock Party. Only the repeated version was retained in the BBC Radio archive so parts of the original broadcasts were lost to posterity.

The duration of the repeat version of episode three was surprisingly greater than the original broadcast. This was principally due to an extra 2 minutes and 10 seconds of theme music being clumsily tacked on the end, immediately after the final credit. 43 seconds of stings were also incorporated into the repeat. A total of 2 minutes and 5 seconds of the original was cut out and lost, seemingly needlessly.

=== Broadcast dates and durations ===
Episode	Transmission Details			
Episode	Radio 3		Radio 2	
Episode	Date	Duration	Date	Duration
1	19 February 1981	31'25"	30 June 1981	28'37"
2	26 February 1981	31'45"	7 July 1981	28'50"
3	5 March 1981	28'27"	14 July 1981	29'15"
4	12 March 1981	32'02"	21 July 1981	29'05"
5	19 March 1981	29'48"	28 July 1981	Not available
6	26 March 1981	32'03"	4 August 1981	28'00"
7	2 April 1981	32'02"	11 August 1981	Not available
8	9 April 1981	33'06"	18 August 1981	Not available
