= Lara Mazur =

Canadian film and television editor

- Born: Winnipeg, Manitoba
- Education: University of Manitoba
- Occupation: Film editor

Lara Mazur is a Canadian film and television editor known for her work on films like Bordertown Café, Cadillac Girls, and The Burning Season.

== Biography ==
Born in Winnipeg, Manitoba, Mazur attended the University of Manitoba and after graduating, she studied film editing under the guidance of veteran editors Jane Thompson and Bob Lower. Early on in her career, she frequently worked on the films of director Allan Kroeker. She was nominated for a Genie Award for her work editing Norma Bailey's 1992 film Bordertown Cafe, eventually winning one for her work on Anne Wheeler's Suddenly Naked.

== Selected filmography ==
- Tramp at the Door (1985)
- The Wake (1986)
- Martha, Ruth & Edie (1988)
- American Boyfriends (1989)
- The Legend of Kootenai Brown (1991)
- Bordertown Café (1992)
- Cadillac Girls (1993)
- The Burning Season (1993)
- Nights Below Station Street (1997)
- Extraordinary Visitor (1998)
- Suddenly Naked (2001)
- Chilly Dogs (2001)
- Shameless: The Art of Disability (2006)
- Angela's Shadow (2024)
- Whatcha Want (2026)
