= Earle Grey Award =

Canadian award for television acting

The Earle Grey Award is the lifetime achievement award for television acting of the Canadian Screen Awards, and its predecessor the Gemini Awards. It can be presented to an individual or collaborative team (such as SCTV or Royal Canadian Air Farce), and may be presented posthumously.

The award was named in honour of Earle Grey, an actor and theatre director who founded the Earle Grey Players theatre troupe and had served as the first president of ACTRA's local chapter in Toronto.

The award was first presented by the ACTRA Awards in 1972, as the award for best performance in a television film within the annual eligibility period. In the earliest years it was the only acting award presented by the ACTRA Awards, although it was later supplemented with an award for best performance in a television series. Beginning in 1983, separate categories were introduced for performances by actors and actresses in television films; when the ACTRA Awards were taken over by the Gemini Awards beginning in 1986, the Earle Grey Award name was then transitioned into the Geminis' lifetime achievement award instead of being retained as the name for the primary annual acting awards.

Nominations for the award are presented by professionals within the Canadian television community and the decision of who will win the award is made by a special committee. However, it is not necessarily always presented annually.

== Recipients ==
=== ACTRA Awards ===
- 1972 - Geneviève Bujold
- 1973 - Gordon Pinsent, The Rowdyman
- 1974 - Jackie Burroughs, Vicky
- 1975 - William Hutt, The National Dream
- 1976 - Jayne Eastwood, The Last of the Four Letter Words
- 1977 - Sean Sullivan, Of the Fields, Lately
- 1978 - Donald Sutherland, Bethune
- 1979 - Helen Burns, Catsplay
- 1980 - Don Francks, Drying Up the Streets
- 1981 - Al Waxman, The Winnings of Frankie Walls
- 1982 - Lally Cadeau, You've Come a Long Way, Katie
- 1983 - Rosemary Dunsmore, Blind Faith
- 1984 - Kenneth Welsh, Empire, Inc. (actor); Linda Griffiths, Empire, Inc. (actress)
- 1985 - Douglas Rain, A Flush of Tories (actor); Susan Wright, Slim Obsession (actress)
- 1986 - Maury Chaykin, Canada's Sweetheart: The Saga of Hal C. Banks (actor); Leueen Willoughby, The Other Kingdom (actress)

=== Gemini Awards ===
- 1986 - Ed McNamara (posthumous)
- 1987 - Lorne Greene
- 1988 - Kate Reid
- 1989 - Sean McCann
- 1990 - Jan Rubeš
- 1992 - Colleen Dewhurst (posthumous award)
- 1993 - Barbara Hamilton
- 1994 - Ernie Coombs (Mr. Dressup)
- 1995 - Cast of SCTV: Rick Moranis, Eugene Levy, Andrea Martin, Martin Short, Joe Flaherty, Catherine O'Hara, John Candy (posthumous), Harold Ramis, Dave Thomas.
- 1996 - Bruno Gerussi (posthumous)
- 1997 - Gordon Pinsent
- 1998 - Kenneth Welsh and Al Waxman
- 1999 - Jayne Eastwood
- 2000 - Cast and writers of Royal Canadian Air Farce: Ron Mann, Roger Abbott, Luba Goy, Don Ferguson, John Morgan.
- 2001 - Jackie Burroughs
- 2002 - Members of CODCO: Tommy Sexton (posthumous), Andy Jones, Greg Malone
- 2003 - Jennifer Dale
- 2004 - Graham Greene
- 2005 - Steve Smith
- 2006 - Donnelly Rhodes
- 2007 - Don Harron
- 2008 - David Gardner
- 2009 - Eric Peterson
- 2010 - Not awarded
- 2011 - Cedric Smith

=== Canadian Screen Awards ===
- 2012 - Not awarded
- 2013 - Not awarded
- 2014 - Colm Feore
- 2015 - Paul Gross
- 2016 - Wendy Crewson
- 2017 - Tantoo Cardinal
- 2018 - Clark Johnson
- 2019 - Tina Keeper
- 2022 - Peter MacNeill
- 2023 - Patrick Huard
