= Tramp at the Door =

Canadian television film

- Genre: Drama
- Based on: "Tramp at the Door" by Gabrielle Roy
- Written by: Allan Kroeker
- Directed by: Allan Kroeker
- Starring: Ed McNamara; August Schellenberg; Monique Mercure; Eric Peterson
- Theme music composer: Randolph Peters
- Country of origin: Canada
- Original languages: English; French; Russian

Production
- Producer: Stan Thomas
- Cinematography: Ron Orieux
- Editor: Lara Mazur
- Running time: 81 minutes
- Production company: CanWest Global

Original release
- Network: CKND-TV
- Release: September 14, 1985

Tramp at the Door is a Canadian television film, directed by Allan Kroeker and broadcast in 1985. Adapted from the Gabrielle Roy short story "Tramp at the Door" ("Un vagabond frappe à notre porte"), the film stars Ed McNamara as Gustave, a Russian vagrant who arrives at the farm of Franco-Manitoban couple Albert (August Schellenberg) and Madeleine (Monique Mercure) Fournier pretending to be a long-lost relative from Quebec.

The cast also included Joanna Schellenberg, Eric Peterson, Jean-Louis Hébert, Melissa Dixon, Ian Wilson, James Martin, Stan Thomas, Len Klady, Kelly Sisson and Dennis Young.

The film was produced by Winnipeg independent television station CKND under its program of funding Manitoba film productions.

== Distribution ==
Faced with the dilemma that the film would likely need award nominations to secure a sale to the national CBC or CTV networks, but the station would have to accept a 20 per cent reduction in the price the networks were willing to pay if the film had already been broadcast in prime time in a major Canadian television market, station manager Stan Thomas followed the strategy of airing the film on CKND at 4:30 a.m. without promotion, so that it was eligible for ACTRA Award consideration while still having been essentially unseen by an actual television audience so that he could negotiate the maximum price. The film also received a subsequent theatrical screening at the Yorkton Film Festival in October 1985.

The film was acquired by the CBC, which rebroadcast it in 1987 both in English on CBC Television, and in French on the Radio-Canada arts anthology series Les Beaux Dimanches.

== Critical response ==
John Haslett Cuff of The Globe and Mail wrote that "it's all technically well done with scrupulous attention to period detail, including the temporary revival of a vintage steam train, the "Prairie Dog Central." Ron Orieux's cinematography is alternately lush and appropriately moody, imbuing the harsh, dreary Manitoba landscape with a beauty only a photographer could see. The acting, with the notable exception of Eric Peterson, is effortlessly good. Peterson plays a sort of comic detective who seems entirely out of place in the script and his reading is as pallid as his face. Johanna Schellenberg, young as she is, is captivating and has one particularly lovely scene in a schoolroom where she recreates the character of Gustave for her teacher and schoolmates. And McNamara shows precisely why he was given a posthumous Gemini for his body of work as an actor."

== Awards ==
Due to overlapping eligibility periods, the film was eligible for both the final 15th ACTRA Awards and the inaugural 1st Gemini Awards.

Award	Date of ceremony	Category	Nominees	Result	Reference
ACTRA Awards	1986	Best Direction in a TV Drama	Allan Kroeker	Nominated	
ACTRA Awards	1986	Best Writing in a TV Drama	Allan Kroeker	Nominated	
Gemini Awards	1986	Best TV Movie	Stan Thomas, Don Brinton	Nominated	
Gemini Awards	1986	Best Direction in a Dramatic Program	Allan Kroeker	Nominated	
Gemini Awards	1986	Best Performance by a Lead Actor in a Single Dramatic Program or Miniseries	Ed McNamara	Nominated	
Gemini Awards	1986	Best Photography in a Dramatic Program or Series	Ron Orieux	Nominated	
Gemini Awards	1986	Best Picture Editing in a Dramatic Program or Series	Lara Mazur	Nominated	
