= Peter Dvorsky =

Peter Dvorsky may refer to:

- Peter Dvorský, Slovak singer
- Peter Dvorsky (actor), Canadian actor
