= Turning to Stone =

- Genre: Drama
- Written by: Judith Thompson
- Directed by: Eric Till
- Starring: Nicky Guadagni; Anne Anglin; Jackie Richardson; Shirley Douglas; Bernard Behrens
- Theme music composer: John Welsman
- Country of origin: Canada
- Original language: English

Production
- Producer: John Kastner
- Cinematography: Vic Sarin
- Editor: Thomas Berner
- Running time: 90 minutes
- Production company: Canadian Broadcasting Corporation

Original release
- Network: CBC Television
- Release: February 25, 1986

Turning to Stone is a Canadian docudrama television film, which was broadcast by CBC Television in 1986. Directed by Eric Till and written by Judith Thompson, the film stars Nicky Guadagni as Allison Campbell, a woman who is sent to Ontario's Prison for Women after being set up by her boyfriend to smuggle drugs from Mexico to Canada without her knowledge.

The film was based on interviews with real women in prison, conducted by documentarian John Kastner during the creation of his documentary films The Parole Dance and The Lifer and the Lady. Many of the incidents depicted in the film were real occurrences which the prisoners had not felt comfortable or safe discussing openly on camera, but which Kastner felt were valuable illustrations of the importance of prison reform, so he chose to produce his first-ever scripted fiction film to dramatize them as a companion piece to his prison documentaries.

The cast also includes Anne Anglin, Jackie Richardson, Kim Renders, Maria Vacratsis and Shirley Douglas as fellow inmates in the prison, Bernard Behrens as Allison's father, and Paul Gross, Lubomir Mykytiuk and Barbara Budd in small supporting roles.

The film was broadcast by the CBC on February 25, 1986.

== Critical response ==
Liam Lacey of The Globe and Mail wrote that the film's drama was overshadowed by its documentary aspects: "What lingers about Turning To Stone isn't the voyeuristic drama (middle-class people really aren't the biggest problem with the prison system), but the naturalistic acting, the dialogue, and the subtly oppressive atmosphere. It's these documentary elements which tell us that banality is the horror of prison life; that prison, after all, is a place where people spend most of their time doing nothing important, every day, over and over again."

Mike Boone of the Montreal Gazette wrote that "Kastner, Till and Thompson don't shrink from rubbing viewers noses in the misery and despair of prison life. And given the producer's reputation as a documentarist, we can safely assume that Turning to Stone is an accurate - albeit slightly juiced up - reflection of what really goes on in Kingston pen. The movie is excellent. Don't miss it."

For the Ottawa Citizen, Noel Taylor wrote that "Turning To Stone makes tough demands on the viewer that are best met head-on. Be prepared to be shocked, and to be moved. It's that rare kind of television - something to be outraged by."

== Awards ==
The film was nominated for seven Gemini Awards at the 1st Gemini Awards in 1986. Kastner threatened to boycott the awards on the grounds that Donald Brittain's Canada's Sweetheart: The Saga of Hal C. Banks had been ruled eligible for nominations despite having already received nominations and awards from the predecessor ACTRA Awards the previous year, although he ultimately did not do so.

Award	Date of ceremony	Category	Nominees	Result	Reference
Gemini Awards	December 4, 1986	Best Actress in a Dramatic Program or Miniseries	Nicky Guadagni	Nominated	
Gemini Awards	December 4, 1986	Best Supporting Actor in a Dramatic Program or Miniseries	Bernard Behrens	Nominated	
Gemini Awards	December 4, 1986	Best Supporting Actress in a Dramatic Program or Miniseries	Anne Anglin	Nominated	
Gemini Awards	December 4, 1986	Best Supporting Actress in a Dramatic Program or Miniseries	Jackie Richardson	Nominated	
Gemini Awards	December 4, 1986	Best Writing in a Dramatic Program or Miniseries	Judith Thompson	Nominated	
Gemini Awards	December 4, 1986	Best Picture Editing in a Dramatic Program or Miniseries	Thomas Berner	Nominated	
Gemini Awards	December 4, 1986	Best Sound in a Dramatic Program or Miniseries	Joe Grimaldi, Thomas Berner, Erik Hoppe	Nominated	
