= Love and Larceny =

Love and Larceny may refer to:

- Love and Larceny, an 1881 English farce by Edward Solomon
- Il Mattatore, also released as Love and Larceny, a 1960 Italian comedy film
- Love and Larceny (1985 film), a Canadian television film directed by Robert Iscove
