= Charlie Grant's War =

1985 Canadian TV film directed by Martin Lavut

- Genre: Drama
- Written by: Anna Sandor
- Directed by: Martin Lavut
- Starring: R. H. Thomson
- Country of origin: Canada
- Original language: English

Production
- Producer: William Gough
- Cinematography: Vic Sarin
- Editor: Myrtle Virgo
- Running time: 125 minutes

Original release
- Network: CBC Television
- Release: January 27, 1985

Charlie Grant's War is a Canadian television film, directed by Martin Lavut and broadcast by CBC Television in 1985. Set during World War II, the film stars R. H. Thomson as Charlie Grant, a Canadian activist and humanitarian who was living in Austria at the time of the war, and helped to smuggle over 600 Jews out of the country for their safety.

The film's cast also included Jean Archambault, Anthony Bekenn, Peter Boretski, Douglas Campbell, Marigold Charlesworth, Peter Dvorsky, Jan Rubeš, Vlasta Vrána, Louis Negin, Joan Orenstein and John Friesen.

The film had its television premiere on January 27, 1985.

== Plot ==
Shocked and horrified by the rising tide of anti-Semitism in war-torn Vienna, Grant uses his position as a diamond broker to obtain illegal passports and safe passage for hundreds of Jews. He is discovered, arrested by the Gestapo, and imprisoned in some of the most notorious Nazi concentration camps in Europe.

== Cast ==
- R. H. Thomson as Charlie Grant
- Jan Rubeš as Jacob Goldman
- Joan Orenstein as Elizabeth Goldman
- Peter Boretski as Paul Trefius
- Nicholas Rice as Peter Klein
- Marigold Charlesworth as Mrs. Grant
- Douglas Campbell as Manlus
- Belinda Metz as Christina Oswalt
- John Friesen as Fritz
- Heiner Pillar as Graebner
- Michael Fletcher as Max Boldt
- Annie Szamosi as Klara
- Larry Reynolds as William Lyon Mackenzie King
- Michael J. Reynolds as Blair
- Michael Tait as Harry Crerar
- Louis Negin as Otto Schmidt
- Peter Dvorsky as Con Man
- David Bolt as Epstein
- Jean Archambault as Andre
- Robin McCullough as Roland
- Joseph Cooper as Rabbi
- Charles Palmer as Priest
- Derek Keurvorst as Commandant
- Chris Bark as David
- Vlasta Vrána as Police Chief
- Glyn Evans as Tenor
- Rochelle Stern as Box Car Singer
- Brendan McKane as Canadian MP

== Accolades and awards ==
The film received several ACTRA Award nominations at the 15th ACTRA Awards in 1986, including for Best TV Program, Best Actor (Thomson), Best Supporting Performance (Dvorsky, Rubeš) and Best Writing (Anna Sandor). It won the awards for Best Program and Best Writing.
