= Anne Anglin =

Canadian actress and theatre director

Anne Anglin (born 1942) is a Canadian actress and theatre director. She is most noted for her performance as Sharon in the 1986 television film Turning to Stone, for which she was a Genie Award nominee for Best Supporting Actress in a Drama Program or Series at the 1st Gemini Awards, and her recurring role as Mrs. Cooney, the grandmother of J.T. Yorke, in Degrassi: The Next Generation.

Her other film and television credits have included the films Ada, Scanners, Butterbox Babies and House, and appearances in the television series King of Kensington, Seeing Things, Love and Betrayal: The Mia Farrow Story, Train 48 and This Is Wonderland.

Most prominently a stage actress, her roles have included productions of Judith Merril's Headspace, Erika Ritter's Winter 1671, David Fennario's Balconville, William Shakespeare's Macbeth, Anne Chislett's Quiet in the Land, Sally Clark's Lost Souls and Missing Persons, Layne Coleman's Blue City Slammers, James W. Nichol's stage adaptation of Margaret Laurence's novel The Stone Angel and Michel Tremblay's Counter Service.

She won a Dora Mavor Moore Award for best female performance, midsized theatre division in 1993 for The Stone Angel. She was nominated for best female performance in a featured role in 1986 for Blue City Slammers, and best female performance, midsized theatre in 1995 for Counter Service.

== Personal life ==
Her father was magazine journalist and editor Gerald Anglin.

She is married to playwright Paul Thompson, and is the mother of theatre director Severn Thompson.
