= Charlie Grant (activist) =

Canadian salesman and human rights activist

Charles Grant (22 October 1902 - 28 May 1980) was a Canadian salesman and human rights activist.

He left home early to travel and eventually became a diamond broker in Vienna.

In 1938 he was arrested by the Nazis for currency speculation and spent the entire war in internment camps. Charlie Grant was also telecasted on CBC for this war.

He is portrayed by R. H. Thomson in the fictionalized account of his war experiences in Charlie Grant's War which aired 1985 on CBC.
