= Spasms (film) =

- Directed by: William Fruet
- Written by: Don Enright; William Fruet
- Based on: Death Bite by Michael Maryk; Brent Monahan
- Produced by: John G. Pozhke; Maurice Smith
- Starring: Peter Fonda; Oliver Reed; Kerrie Keane; Al Waxman
- Cinematography: Mark Irwin
- Edited by: Ralph Brunjes
- Music by: Eric Robertson; Tangerine Dream
- Production companies: Hyperion Productions; Canadian Film Development Corporation; Famous Players
- Distributed by: Astral Films (Canada); Producers Distributing (US)
- Release dates: October 28, 1983 (Canada); May 11, 1984 (US)
- Running time: 90 min.
- Country: Canada
- Language: English

Spasms is a 1983 Canadian horror film directed by William Fruet and starring Peter Fonda, Oliver Reed, and Kerrie Keane. It is based on the 1979 novel Death Bite by Michael Maryk and Brent Monahan

== Plot ==
Reclusive millionaire philanthropist Jason Kincaid lost his brother to a massive taipan serpent during a hunting trip in Micronesia. The snake also bit him, but rather than dying from the venom he survived and seemingly developed a telepathic link with the creature, caused by the venom mutating the brain cells responsible for extrasensory perception. Haunted by visions of the snake's continued killings, Kincaid pays to have a poacher capture it and deliver it to his mansion outside San Diego. He hires psychiatrist and ESP researcher Tom Brasilian in the hopes that he can help him rid of the unwanted psychic link once and for all. In exchange, Kincaid offers to underwrite all of Brasilian's on-going research.

However, a Satanic cult also has its eyes on the snake. As it is worshiped by the indigenous natives as the guardian of their underworld, they believe that it is, in fact, a demon and hopes to acquire it for worship. The cult hires ex-CIA agent Warren Crowley to steal the snake. Crowley bribes a sailor on the ship transporting it to the United States to help secure it, but the mole is killed when he attempts to look inside the snake's container and is bitten. The venom causes his blood vessels and visceral tissues to rapidly swell and he dies by falling overboard.

As Brasilian insists on keeping the snake at his university laboratory until Kincaid's private lab is constructed, he oversees its transportation there, unknowingly being tailed by Crowley and his minder Deacon Tyrone. Kincaid's niece Suzanne, believing that his psychic link is actually a delusion brought on by the trauma of her father's death, attempts to kill the snake by secretly increasing the temperature of its container to a lethal 150 degrees. That night, Crowley and Tyrone break into the lab. Tyrone, realizing that the snake is overheated, opens the container. The snake promptly breaks loose and kills Tyrone and the lab director before escaping outside. Brasilian and Suzanne are summoned to the site by police, while Kincaid senses that the snake has broken loose.

Brasilian surmises that the snake must go to a temperate environment, and searches a nearby greenhouse with Suzanne. The snake attacks them, and Brasilian barely manages to fend it off with a fire extinguisher. Police arrive, but Kincaid manages to ward them off by convincing them of the danger the creature poses. All three are taken into custody, and police are skeptical of Kincaid's claims and threaten to charge him with manslaughter for illicitly importing such a deadly animal. Meanwhile, the snake attacks a nearby sorority house and kills its inhabitants, an act Kincaid witnesses through his mental link.

Crowley is threatened by the cult for his failure to secure the snake. He bribes the location of Kincaid's residence and travels there by van, believing the snake will eventually travel there at which point he can capture it. Meanwhile, Brasilian determines that Kincaid's psychic link can be used to track down the snake before it strikes again. He hooks him up to a brain-pattern monitoring device, and Kincaid begins having a telepathic episode, seeing the snake arrive at his house and kill Crowley. Kincaid can only shout out a few cryptic words before the connection is lost, and disappears before he can be questioned any further. Suzanne realizes that he was referring to their house, and she and Brasilian race to intercept him.

Kincaid arrives at the house, where the snake has already killed a groundskeeper. Picking up an assault rifle, he searches the grounds but is repeatedly struck by more and more intense visions of the snake's previous kills, losing his gun in the process. Finally, he confronts the creature in the backyard, where the psychic energy causes spontaneous explosions around the two. He attacks it with a knife, but it quickly gains the upper hand and kills him. Brasilian and Suzanne arrive, and Brasilian picks up Kincaid's gun and shoots the snake to death. He and Suzanne leave as the snake's remains burn side by side with Kincaid.

== Cast ==
- Peter Fonda as Dr. Tom Brasilian
- Oliver Reed as Jason Kincaid
- Kerrie Keane as Suzanne Cavadon
- Al Waxman as Warren Crowley
- Marilyn Lightstone as Dr. Claire Rothman
- Angus MacInnes as Deacon Tyrone
- Miguel Fernandes as Mendes
- Gerard Parkes as Capt. Novack
- William Needles as Dean Franklin
- George Bloomfield as Rev. Thomas Thanner
- Laurie Brown as Allison
- Julie Khaner as Marcie
- Harvey Chao as Dr. Lee
- Patrick Brymer as Keith
- Denis Simpson as Abo Shaman
- Sandra Awalt as Sharon
- Al Maini as Abo Interpreter

== Production ==
Writers Michael Maryk and Brent Monahan wrote the novel Death Bite in 1979 to cash in on the success of Peter Benchley’s Jaws in the hopes that their novel would likewise be turned into a feature film. Hollywood agent Martin Erlichman bought the rights to the novel for $5,000 for one year. According to Monahan, Erlichman was fond of optioning screenplays on spec, and had file cabinets filled with the works of many anxious writers seeking to hit it big. Having done nothing with the ‘’Death Bite’’ property in the interim, and only a couple months remaining on his option, Erlichman sought to take advantage of the tax breaks afforded in Canada's film industry at that time.

The film was originally announced in January 1981 newspaper reports to begin shooting in February of that year. During the planning stages, the original aim was to use live snakes for portions of the attack sequences. Herpetologist and snake wrangler Bob Zappalorti was going to provide the reptiles and Raymond Mendez, a well known model-maker, insect wrangler, and photographer would create hand puppets for close-ups. A 14 foot Indian Rock Python was bought and stored in NYC for almost a year before the idea of using real reptiles was discarded.

As pre-production went on, the film went through several rewrites and different directors who eventually left when principal photography failed to materialize. When filming finally started, original production studio Filmpro Limited went bankrupt less than a week in, and banking firm Cinequity Corporation took over bringing two inexperienced men on board as producers. Fearing the film would fail to stand-out among the trend of “animal attack” movies coming out at the time, Cinequity rewrote the script to add supernatural elements, replaced the wrangled snakes with animatronics, and brought on-board director William Fruet in May 1981.

Filming took place in-and-around various locations in Toronto, Ontario. The Kincaid estate was Valley Halla Estate by the Rouge River, and the opening sequence was filmed at Scarborough Bluffs Park. The animatronics used to realize the snake were designed by Mendez and Neal Martz. Originally six different snakes—each performing its own function—were to be built, but with a limited amount of money and time constraints, this idea was scrapped and doing as much as possible with a single mechanical snake was considered more feasible. While filming commenced in Canada, Mendez and his small crew of six built their robot monster in New York in autonomy over the course of eight weeks between August and October 1981. Two 22 ft bodies, three 6 ft necks to accommodate an armature, and puppet heads were used to bring creatures to life. The gore effects, including the graphic results of the snake's bite, were designed and realized by Academy Award-winning makeup artists Dick Smith and Stephan Dupuis, and featured heavily the former's signature air bladder technique. Invited to watch the filming in Toronto, both Maryk and Monahan left after three days upon becoming irritated with the constant alterations being made to their work.

Despite the impressive nature of the finished product, Fruet was unsatisfied with how it looked on-screen when interacting with the live actors, and limited its appearance in the final film through the use of POV shots and quick edits. A climactic end battle between Oliver Reed and the snake was planned and filmed. It included scenes of the snake partially swallowing Reed's arm, and him stabbing and dismembering it with a knife. Fruet was unsatisfied with the effects, and heavily re-edited the sequence, cutting most of the snake's appearances and padding it out with flashbacks. Other extended, gory sequences were either planned or filmed, including a nightmare sequence in which some victims of the snake show up covered with graphic wounds. Fruet claims that additional shots with more graphic violence were filmed specifically for the East Asian release of the film.

Fonda said in 1990 that "They couldn't figure out how to end the damn film. I told Ollie that it's up to him to make that huge snake look good...'You've got to make it look like it's going to kill you Ollie!' He was probably sober part of the time. It's really too bad. He’s a joke on himself. You know, the poor guy is very talented. It's just that he's simply become a caricature of himself."

== Release ==
The film was given a limited release theatrically in the United States by Producers Distributing Corporation in May 1984. The film was released on VHS by Thorn EMI.

In April 2016, CodeRed released the film on DVD and Blu-ray for the first time. Because the print used for the release was missing a reel, CodeRed substituted with Standard Definition footage from a VHS master.

== Soundtrack ==
The film's score was composed by Eric Robertson. Tangerine Dream composed every scary dark ambient themes during the film and the end credits.

== See also ==
- List of killer snake films
