= Ed McNamara =

Canadian actor

- Born: Edward Francis McNamara; 21 June 1921; Chicago, Illinois, U.S.
- Died: 11 October 1986 (aged 65); Toronto, Ontario, Canada
- Occupation: Actor
- Years active: 1941–1986
- Spouse: Peg Dixon

Edward Francis McNamara (21 June 1921 – 11 October 1986) was a Canadian film actor. He appeared in more than 40 films from 1941 to 1986.

At the 27th Canadian Film Awards in 1976, McNamara and his costar Hugh Webster jointly won the Canadian Film Award for Best Actor in a Non-Feature for their performances in For Gentlemen Only, and McNamara received a Genie Award nomination for Best Actor at the 7th Genie Awards in 1986, for his performance in Bayo. In the same year, he posthumously received the Academy of Canadian Cinema and Television's Earle Grey Award for lifetime achievement at the 1st Gemini Awards.

== Selected filmography ==
Film
Year	Title	Role	Notes
1976	Silver Streak	Benny	
1976	For Gentlemen Only		
1976	Find the Lady	Kominsky	
1976	Goldenrod	Johnson	
1979	The Black Stallion	Jake	
1985	Bayo	Phillip Longlan	

TV
Year	Title	Role	Notes
1961-1964	Playdate		3 episodes
1962	Scarlett Hill		
1967	Spider-Man	Rhino and train conductor #2 (voice)	
1966-1969	Rocket Robin Hood	Little John (voice)	52 episodes
1972	Springhill		Television film
1985	Tramp at the Door	Gustave	
1986-1987	Red Serge	Abe Farwell	12 episodes
1986	Ray Bradbury Theater	Sinister old man	Episode: 'The Town Where No One Got Off'
1986	Philip Marlowe, Private Eye	Henry Jeeter	Episode: 'Trouble is My Business'
