= Ron Orieux =

Ron Orieux is a Canadian film and television cinematographer.

He is most noted for his work on the documentary film Spartree, for which he won the Canadian Film Award for Best Cinematography in a Documentary (Non-Feature) at the 29th Canadian Film Awards in 1978, and the television miniseries The First Circle, for which he won the Gemini Award for Best Photography in a Dramatic Program or Series at the 6th Gemini Awards in 1992.

He also received a Genie Award nomination for Best Cinematography in a Documentary (Non-Feature) at the 1st Genie Awards in 1980 for Nails, and Gemini Award nominations Best Photography in a Dramatic Program or Series at the 1st Gemini Awards in 1986 for Tramp at the Door, the 9th Gemini Awards in 1995 for Due South, and the 12th Gemini Awards in 1998 for Breach of Faith: A Family of Cops 2.
