= The Execution of Raymond Graham =

- Written by: Mel Frohman
- Directed by: Daniel Petrie
- Starring: Jeff Fahey; Laurie Metcalf; Graham Beckel; Kate Reid; Morgan Freeman
- Music by: Jimmy Dale
- Countries of origin: Canada; United States
- Original language: English

Production
- Producer: David W. Rintels
- Editor: David B. Thompson
- Running time: 96 minutes
- Production companies: Alliance Entertainment; Hearst Entertainment

Original release
- Network: ABC; CTV
- Release: November 17, 1985

The Execution of Raymond Graham is a Canadian-American television film, directed by Daniel Petrie and broadcast in 1985. The film stars Jeff Fahey and co-stars Laurie Metcalf as Raymond Graham's sister Carol, Graham Beckel as his brother Vic, Kate Reid as their mother, Josef Sommer and Lois Smith as the parents of Graham's victim, and Morgan Freeman as Warden Pratt, as well as George Dzundza, Alan Scarfe, Linda Griffiths, Philip Sterling, Linda Goranson, Michael Dolan, Walker Boone, Ken Pogue and Doug Lennox in supporting roles.

== Plot ==
Raymond Graham is a prisoner on death row after committing murder. He is in the final hours of his life before his scheduled execution as his lawyer pursues a last-ditch hope of having his execution stayed by the governor.

== Production ==
The film was conceived as a live broadcast that would unfold in real time, building in suspense as it was not revealed in advance whether or not his lawyer's final plea for clemency would succeed prior to the moment of execution at 10:58 p.m. A dress rehearsal was recorded as a backup, and was "broadcast" in the network control centre in tandem with the live feed, so that the network could rapidly switch to the backup tape in the event of a technical failure, but this precaution was ultimately not needed.

The film was not intended to either support or oppose capital punishment, but simply to ask people to reflect on the issue. As research for the role, Fahey met with death row inmate Charles Rumbaugh, who was executed a few months before the broadcast.

It was broadcast live on November 17, 1985, from the Toronto studios of CFTO-TV, by both CTV Television Network in Canada and ABC in the United States. Due to the sensitivity of the subject matter making it less appropriate for the early evening time slot, however, viewers in the Pacific Time Zone saw a tape-delayed rebroadcast rather than the live production.

== Awards ==
Award	Date of ceremony	Category	Recipient(s)	Result	Ref(s)
Gemini Awards	December 4, 1986	Best TV Movie	Julian Marks, David W. Rintels	Nominated	
Gemini Awards	December 4, 1986	Best Performance by a Lead Actor in a Single Dramatic Program or Mini-Series	Jeff Fahey	Nominated	
Primetime Emmy Awards	September 21, 1986	Outstanding Directing for a Limited or Anthology Series or Movie	Daniel Petrie	Nominated	
Primetime Emmy Awards	September 21, 1986	Outstanding Lighting Design / Lighting Direction for a Variety Special	John Botelho, Fred "Red" McKinnon, Barney Stewart	Nominated	
Writers Guild of America	1987	Television: Long Form – Original	Mel Frohman	Won	
