= Oakmount High =

- Written by: Timothy Bond; Peter Jobin
- Directed by: Timothy Bond
- Starring: Susan Hogan; Saul Rubinek; Thomas Peacocke
- Music by: Bruce Ley
- Country of origin: Canada
- Original language: English

Production
- Producer: Peter Lower
- Cinematography: Kenneth W. Gregg
- Running time: 52 minutes

Original release
- Network: CBC Television
- Release: December 8, 1985

Oakmount High is a Canadian drama television film, directed by Timothy Bond and released in 1985. The film stars Susan Hogan as Carol Webber, a woman who breaks up with her wealthy husband and moves to a small town with her 13-year-old son Chris (Jason Hopley); she begins a new relationship with her Jewish friend Paul Green (Saul Rubinek), while Chris begins to fall under the influence of Harry Gibson (Thomas Peacocke), a school principal who is teaching anti-Semitic conspiracy theories.

Although the CBC claimed that the film was not based on the story of James Keegstra, sufficient similarities to Keegstra's case were noted that Keegstra sought and won a court injunction preventing the program from being broadcast in Alberta, with a claim that its broadcast would interfere with his chance at a fair appeal of his conviction on hate speech charges.

The film was broadcast on CBC Television across the rest of Canada, on December 8, 1985.

== Awards ==
Award	Date of ceremony	Category	Recipient(s)	Result	Ref(s)
Gemini Awards	December 4, 1986	Best Short Drama	Peter Lower	Won	
Gemini Awards	December 4, 1986	Best Supporting Actor in a Drama Program or Series	Thomas Peacocke	Nominated	
Gemini Awards	December 4, 1986	Best Picture Editing in a Dramatic Program or Series	Ralph Brunjes	Won	
