= Harry Gulkin =

Canadian film and theatre producer (1927–2018)

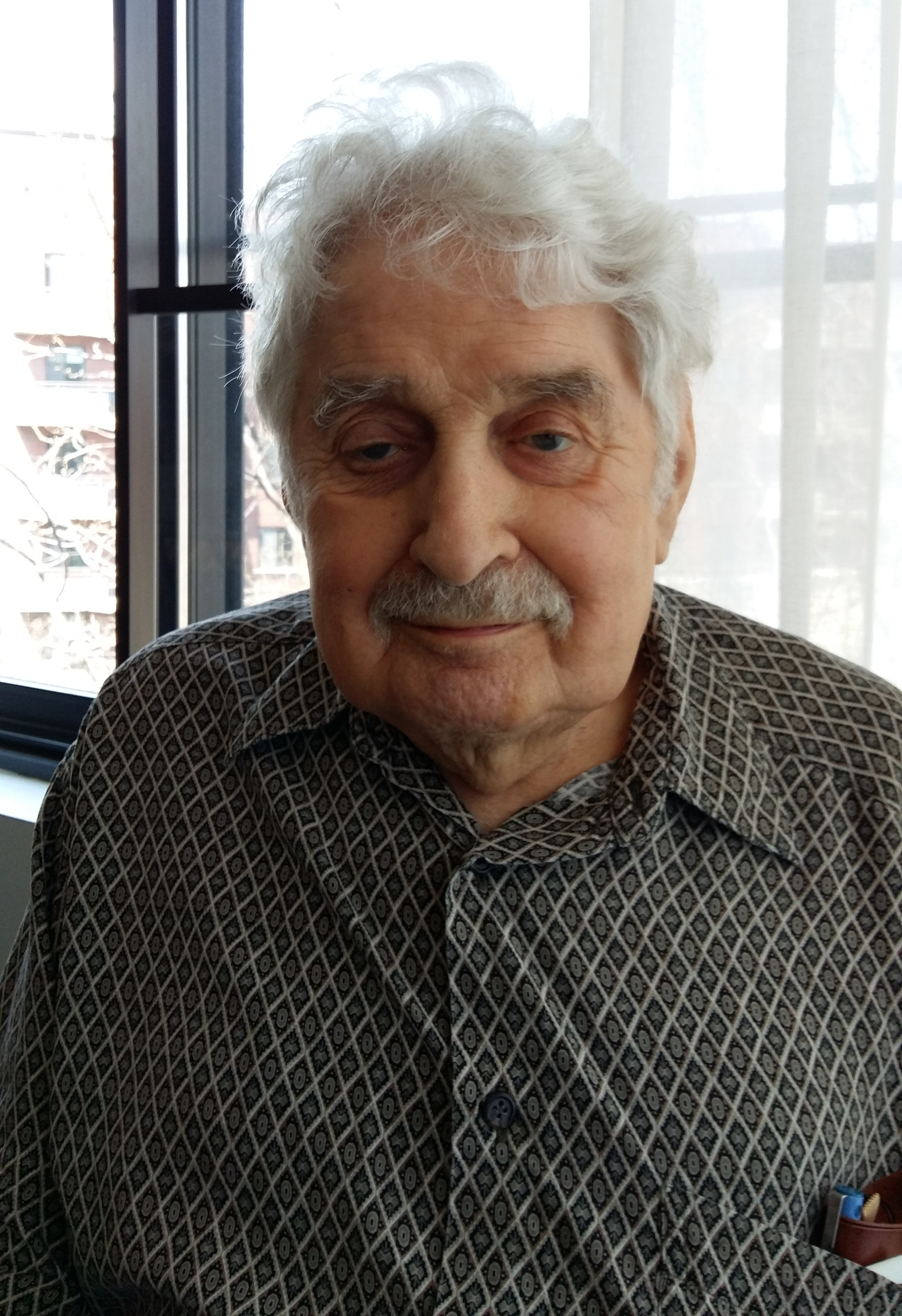
- Gulkin in May 2016
- Born: November 14, 1927; Montreal, Quebec, Canada
- Died: July 23, 2018 (aged 90); Montreal, Quebec, Canada
- Occupation: Filmmaker
- Children: 3, including Sarah Polley

Harry Gulkin (November 14, 1927 – July 23, 2018) was a Canadian film and theatre producer, arts director, and project manager from Montreal, Quebec. He produced the Golden Globe-winning film Lies My Father Told Me.

== Life and career ==
Gulkin was born in Montreal, the son of Raya (née Shinderman) and Peter Gulkin, who were Russian Jewish immigrants. Shortly before World War II ended, Gulkin left Baron Byng High School and entered the merchant marines. When his service ended, he returned to Montréal and began social advocacy work. Gulkin then joined the Communist Party of Canada's weekly newspaper, the Canadian Tribune. There, he worked as an art critic and business manager.

He renounced communism in 1956 after Nikita Khrushchev admitted the atrocities of the Joseph Stalin regime in the Soviet Union in his so-called "secret speech". He then became a marketing executive at Steinberg's supermarket chain.

In 1970, Gulkin decided to transition his career into film. His first major success was the 1975 drama Lies My Father Told Me. Directed by Ján Kadár from a script by Ted Allan, the latter of whom adapted his own story, the film was nominated for an Academy Award for Best Original Screenplay and won a Golden Globe for Best Foreign Film.

From 1983 to 1987, Gulkin was director of the Saidye Bronfman Centre for the Arts. In 1987, he began a 20-year tenure as a project manager with the Société de développement des entreprises culturelles.

== Filmography ==
- 1975 – Lies My Father Told Me
- 1978 – Two Solitudes
- 1978 – Jacob Two-Two Meets the Hooded Fang
- 1985 – Bayo
- 2005 – Red Dawn on Main Street

== Personal life ==
Gulkin married Ruth Penner in 1950 and had two children from that marriage: Catherine (b. 1954) and James Peter (b. 1957). He married Marie Murphy in 1990.

In the 2012 documentary film Stories We Tell, it was revealed that he was the biological father of the film's director, Sarah Polley, through an affair with Polley's married mother, Diane Elizabeth Polley (née MacMillan).

His granddaughter is singer-songwriter Corey Gulkin (formerly known as Corinna Rose) whose song "Green Mountain State" (together with The Rusty Horse Band) can be heard during the credits of his daughter Sarah Polley's movie Take This Waltz (and also in the movie trailer). Corey's song "All the Things I'll Forget" is a homage to her grandfather. Corey also has a short appearance in the documentary feature Harry Gulkin: Red Dawn on Main Street.
