= Douglas Bowie =

Canadian playwright and screenwriter

Douglas Bowie (born 1944) is a Canadian playwright and screenwriter from Kingston, Ontario.

Born and raised in Ottawa, he attended Queen's University and Carleton University, and worked in advertising copywriting in his early career. He won second prize in a television writing contest sponsored by the Canadian Broadcasting Corporation in 1967 for Who Was the Lone Ranger?, which was filmed and broadcast by the network later that year as an episode of the dramatic anthology series Teleplay.

He wrote further screenplays for that series, as well as standalone television films, miniseries and radio dramas in the 1970s and 1980s, before moving into playwriting with The Noble Pursuit in 1991. He concentrated mainly on playwriting thereafter, including a stint as playwright in residence at the Thousand Islands Playhouse.

== Works ==
=== Television ===
- Who Was the Lone Ranger? - 1967
- Amnesty - 1968
- Gunfighter - 1969
- The Contest Eaters - 1970
- The Krokonol Hustlers - 1970
- Moving Day - 1971
- Gunplay - 1971
- You and Me - 1971
- Bargain Basement - 1974
- A Gun, a Grand, a Girl - 1975
- No Way of Telling - 1976
- Breakdown - 1977
- The Man Who Wanted to Be Happy - 1977
- Shantymen of Cache Lake - 1977
- The War Is Over - 1978
- Scoop - 1978
- The Newcomers - 1979, one episode
- Empire, Inc. - 1983
- Love and Larceny - 1985
- Chasing Rainbows - 1988
- Grand Larceny - 1991
- Nothing Too Good for a Cowboy - 1999, one episode
- Must Be Santa - 1999

=== Radio ===
- Prop Man - 1968
- Dream House - 1974
- That Summer in Paris - 1978

=== Film ===
- U-Turn - 1973
- The Boy in Blue - 1986
- Obsessed - 1987

=== Plays ===
- Amnesty - 1971
- The Noble Pursuit - 1991
- ! Sgodsdogs ! - 1997
- Goodbye, Piccadilly - 2002
- Love & Larceny - 2004
- Rope's End - 2006
- Till It Hurts - 2010
- Somewhere Beyond the Sea - 2012

== Awards ==
Award	Date	Category	Recipient	Result	Ref.
ACTRA Awards	1984	Best Writing in a Television Drama	Empire, Inc.	Won	
ACTRA Awards	1986	Best Writing in a Television Drama	Love and Larceny	Nominated	
Genie Awards	1989	Best Adapted Screenplay	Obsessed with Robin Spry	Nominated	
Gemini Awards	1993	Best Writing in a Dramatic Program or Mini-Series	Grand Larceny	Nominated	
Gemini Awards	1998	Margaret Collier Award		Won	
