= Volcano: An Inquiry into the Life and Death of Malcolm Lowry =

1976 film

- Film poster
- Directed by: Donald Brittain; John Kramer
- Written by: Donald Brittain; John Kramer
- Produced by: Donald Brittain; Robert A. Duncan; James de B. Domville (exec.)
- Starring: Richard Burton (readings)
- Narrated by: Donald Brittain
- Cinematography: Douglas Kiefer; Jacques Avoine (animation)
- Edited by: John Kramer; Les Halman (sound); Abbey Jack Neidik (sound)
- Music by: Alain Clavier
- Production company: National Film Board of Canada
- Distributed by: National Film Board of Canada
- Release date: 1976
- Running time: 100 minutes
- Country: Canada
- Language: English

Volcano: An Inquiry into the Life and Death of Malcolm Lowry is a 1976 documentary film directed by Donald Brittain and John Kramer for the National Film Board of Canada.

Malcolm Lowry, author of one of the major novels of the 20th century, Under the Volcano, was an English writer who spent a significant amount of time living and working in Vancouver. Due, in part, to his chronic alcoholism, his life was tortured and nomadic. Shot on location in four countries, the film combines photographs, readings by Richard Burton, and interviews with the people who loved and hated the man.

The documentary tells Lowry's story in two ways: through Lowry’s own tortured words, read by Burton, and through interviews with family members and friends, including Margerie Bonner and Arthur Calder-Marshall, who helplessly watched Lowry’s self-destruction.

Though some have criticized its pedestrian, literal linking of words and images and unrevealing interviews, Volcano is a powerful work that (as one critic wrote) "goes beyond conventional documentary" to reveal "a Picasso-like multi-perspective truth."

Volcano: An Inquiry into the Life and Death of Malcolm Lowry is included as a bonus feature on the Criterion Collection DVD release of Under the Volcano.

== Cast ==
- Marjorie Bonner as Self
- Donald Brittain as Narrator (voice)
- John Buchan as Self (archive footage)
- Richard Burton as Malcolm Lowry (voice)
- Arthur Calder-Marshall as Self
- Albert Russel Erskine as Self

== Awards ==
- 27th Canadian Film Awards, 1976:

Best Documentary
Best Direction
Best Film Editing
Best Sound Editing
Best Music Score
Best Non-Dramatic Script

- Chicago International Film Festival: Nominee, Best Documentary, 1976
- 49th Academy Awards: Nominee: Academy Award for Best Documentary Feature Film, 1977
