= House (1995 film) =

- Directed by: Laurie Lynd
- Written by: Laurie Lynd; Daniel MacIvor (play and screenplay)
- Produced by: Colin Brunton; Karen Lee Hall
- Starring: Daniel MacIvor
- Cinematography: David Makin
- Edited by: Susan Maggi
- Music by: Jeff Bird; Michael Timmins
- Distributed by: Alliance Films
- Release date: September 8, 1995 (TIFF)
- Running time: 85 minutes
- Country: Canada
- Language: English

House is a Canadian drama film, released in 1995. Written and directed by Laurie Lynd as an adaptation of Daniel MacIvor's one-man play House, the film stars MacIvor as Victor, an antisocial drifter with some hints of paranoid schizophrenia, who arrives in the town of Hope Springs and invites ten strangers into the local church to watch him perform a monologue about his struggles and disappointments in life.

The original play was performed solely by MacIvor. For the film, Lynd added several other actors, giving the audience members some moments of direct interaction and intercutting Victor's monologue with scenes which directly depict the stories he describes. The extended cast includes Anne Anglin, Ben Cardinal, Patricia Collins, Jerry Franken, Caroline Gillis, Kathryn Greenwood, Nicky Guadagni, Joan Heney, Rachel Luttrell, Stephen Ouimette, Simon Richards, Christofer Williamson and Jonathan Wilson.

The film premiered at the 1995 Toronto International Film Festival in the Perspectives Canada series, before going into general release in 1996.

The film garnered two Genie Award nominations at the 17th Genie Awards in 1996, for Best Sound Editing (Fred Brennan, Daniel Pellerin, Virginia Storey, Paula Fairfield, Yann Delpuech) and Best Original Song (Michael Timmins, "House on the Horizon".)

== Cast ==
- Anne Anglin as Claire
- Ben Cardinal as Grant
- Patricia Collins as Estelle
- Jerry Franken as Robert
- Caroline Gillis as Caroline
- Kathryn Greenwood as Kathy
- Nicky Guadagni as Carmen
- Joan Heney as Judith
