= Earle Grey Players =

Canadian theater company

The Earle Grey Players were a professional theater company in Canada during the 1940s and 1950s. Founded by Earle Grey and his wife, Mary Godwin, the company specialized in Shakespearean productions, and were responsible for founding the first Shakespeare Festival in Canada in 1949. In addition to holding its annual festival, the Players also toured the country, performing Shakespeare in schools, often providing students with their first exposure to seeing Shakespeare performed live.

== Founding and early history ==
In England, Earle Grey met and married Mary Godwin, and the two had a son, Anthony. The Greys came to Canada in 1939 as part of a theater troop touring the country. When the troop returned to England, the Greys decided to remain in Toronto. They became part of the small theater community there, and noticed that it lacked any Shakespeare tradition. By the mid-1940s, the Greys noticed Canada's burgeoning appreciation for Shakespeare, and the two formed the Earle Grey Players in 1946, designed to promote Shakespeare all season long for the Canadian public. The following year the company put on a production of Twelfth Night on the north terrace of Trinity College. With the success of that performance, the group began presenting Shakespearean productions at different high schools around the country. The group continued to perform at Trinity College over the next several years, holding performances either outside on the quadrangle, or inside of Strachan Hall.

== Earle Grey Shakespeare Festival ==
The group began the First Canadian Shakespeare Festival, which opened on June 27, 1949, with a performance of As You Like It, at the University of Toronto's Trinity College quadrangle. Two years later, the Grey's planted a mulberry tree, alleged to have been taken from the root of the tree supposedly planted by Shakespeare at his last residence, the New Place. With the formation of the Earle Grey Shakespeare Festival, it supplanted the Shakespeare Society of Toronto as the primary source of Shakespeare in Canada. Its primacy was short-lived, however, with the creation of the Stratford Festival in 1953, which quickly grew to the largest Shakespeare festival in the country. As the Stratford waxed, the Earle Grey Festival waned, and the last festival was held in 1959. A fundamental principle of the Grey festival was to produce historical accurate plays according to the author's intentions, a concept which was a significant addition to the post-war discussion on theater.

As far as possible twentieth-century notions would not be permitted. Stunts, fashionable slants, Freudian implications, and silly-clever ideas which are the bane of the contemporary Shakespeare theatre would be ruled out. Arrogant directors would not provide crutches to help the aged and halting playwright in his shamble to oblivion. The accumulation of varnish and the over-painting of centuries would be stripped off and the picture shown as Shakespeare's brush had left it. Our watchword would be 'Back to Shakespeare'... our resolution would be to try and give our audience what Shakespeare had in mind when he wrote, and not some distortion or misconception based on modern ideas.

== Later life and honours ==
In 1960 the Greys left Canada, returning to England, where they continued acting right up to their deaths: Mary Godwin in 1971 and Earl Grey in 1978.

In 1972, the ACTRA Awards introduced the Earle Grey Award to honour the best performance in a Canadian television film within the annual eligibility period. In 1986, when the Academy of Canadian Cinema and Television took over the ACTRA Awards to launch the expanded Gemini Awards, the Earle Grey Award was transitioned into the academy's lifetime achievement award for television acting.

== Notable members ==
- Jonathan Frid
- Lorne Greene
