= For Gentlemen Only =

- Directed by: Michael Scott
- Screenplay by: David King
- Produced by: Vladimir Valenta
- Starring: Ed McNamara; Hugh Webster
- Production company: National Film Board of Canada
- Release date: 1976
- Country: Canada

For Gentlemen Only is a 1976 Canadian short drama film, directed by Michael Scott. Produced by the National Film Board of Canada, the film stars Ed McNamara and Hugh Webster as two retired men living in a men's rooming house, who are struggling with change when the home is acquired by a new owner who plans to rent rooms to women for the first time.

The film won three awards at the 27th Canadian Film Awards, for Best TV Drama, Best Actor in a Non-Feature (shared between McNamara and Webster) and Best Screenplay for a Non-Feature (David King).
