= Bayo (film) =

1985 film

- Theatrical release poster
- Directed by: Mort Ransen
- Written by: Mort Ransen; Terry Ryan; Arnie Gelbart
- Based on: Lightly by Chipman Hall
- Produced by: Harry Gulkin
- Starring: Ed McNamara; Patricia Phillips; Stephen McGrath; Hugh Webster; Cedric Smith
- Cinematography: Georges Dufaux
- Edited by: François Gill; Yves Langlois
- Music by: Loreena McKennitt; Cedric Smith
- Production companies: National Film Board Of Canada; Canadian Broadcasting Company
- Distributed by: Norstar Releasing Inc.; Les Films René Malo
- Release dates: April 25, 1985 (Newfoundland, CBC Television)
- Running time: 99 minutes
- Country: Canada
- Language: English
- Budget: $1,942,000 (CAD)

Bayo is a 1985 Canadian drama film, directed by Mort Ransen and written by Ransen, Terry Ryan, and Arnie Gelbart. The film stars Ed McNamara, Patricia Phillips, Stephan McGrath, Hugh Webster, Cedric Smith, Patrick Lane, and Maisie Rillie. Set in Tickle Cove, Newfoundland and Labrador, the film focuses on the relationship of Bayo (McGrath), a young boy living with his single parent Sharon (Phillips). When Sharon's long-estranged father Phillip (McNamara) returns, Bayo's fascination with his grandfather threatens to upend Sharon's plan to move to Toronto.

The film had a limited theatrical run in the spring of 1985, before airing on CBC Television in the fall. McNamara received a Genie Award nomination for Best Actor at the 7th Genie Awards in 1986, while Phillips received an ACTRA Award nomination for Best Television Actress the same year.

== Plot ==
Sharon (Patricia Phillips) and her ten-year-old son Bayo (Stephen McGrath) reside in the small settlement of Tickle Cove, located on the shores of Bonavista Bay, Newfoundland. Their family has lived there for multiple generations. But, Sharon despises her small-town life that she has there. It is Sharon's dream to move to Toronto so she can forge a new start, which would provide her and Bayo with a better life. Sharon is inspired to move to Toronto because it was where her deceased mother was born. She leaves her large suitcase trunk that is full of clothes in the centre of the foyer in her house. This is a symbolic gesture signalling that the move will soon become a reality.

Sharon hates her father, Phillip Longlan (Ed McNamara), as much as living in Tickle Cove because he forced her and her mother to live there. Phillip subjected them to a life there so he could pursue his passion. Phillip is a fisherman who spends most of his time on a commercial fishing vessel. He supports Sharon by providing her with enough money to survive, but not enough that would allow her to follow through on her dream of leaving.

Bayo does not want to leave, especially since he would leave his grandfather behind. Bayo loves the sea and wants to spend his entire life by the water. Bayo never met his father, who lived and died by the sea. Phillip tells Bayo various stories about sailing, which gives Bayo the fantasy of rowing across the Atlantic Ocean to Portugal.

When Phillip visits Bayo and Sharon, Bayo begs his grandfather not to give his mother enough money that would provide them with the opportunity to move to Toronto. As Phillip grows older he ponders his immediate future and the implications of Bayo learning more about his father.

== Cast ==
- Ed McNamara as Phillip Longlan
- Patricia Phillips as Sharon
- Stephen McGrath as Bayo
- Hugh Webster as Wilf Taylor
- Cedric Smith as Squid Hayman
- Patrick Lane as Old Hayman
- Maisie Rillie as Wanda Hayman
- Nellie Ludlow as Effie Taylor
- Jane Dingle as Mrs. Merrill
- Griffith Brewer as Bern Taylor
- Gordon Ralph as George Walsh
- Richard Edwards as Billy
- Fred Smith as Jimmy White
- Lloyd Olford as Cliff Hunt

== Production ==
The film was adapted from the novel Lightly by Nova Scotia author Chipman Hall. The sole novel published by Hall, who was otherwise employed as a journalist, Lightly was largely out of print by the time of the film's release, and was later republished by the New Canadian Library series under the Bayo title.

== Release ==
Bayo had a limited theatrical release on April 25, 1985, in Newfoundland. It was released at the Avalon Mall in St. John's, Gander, and Corner Brook. It was also released to a wider audience on television through the CBC. Sixtmonths later, the film was released during the fall of 1985.

=== Streaming ===
In Jan 2020 the film was released online on the Canada Media Fund’s Encore+ YouTube channel.

=== Critical response ===
The film has received positive reviews from critics. In Jan Teag's positive review for Cinema Canada, he called Bayo a special film. Noting that Ransen "shied away from the Hollywood gloss that would have destroyed it and has achieved an uncommon ability to make the viewer both joyfully and painfully conscious of their own humanity, that element which is the only true universal".

=== Accolades ===
List of awards and nominations
Award	Date of ceremony	Category	Recipient(s)	Result	Ref.
ACTRA Award	March 18, 1986	Best television actress	Patricia Phillips	Nominated	
Genie Awards	March 20, 1986	Actor in leading role	Ed McNamara	Nominated	
