= Ahô: The Forest People =

1975 film by François Floquet and Daniel Bertolino

- French: Ahô... au coeur du monde primitif
- Directed by: François Floquet; Daniel Bertolino
- Written by: François Floquet; Daniel Bertolino; Georges Perec
- Produced by: François Floquet; Daniel Bertolino
- Narrated by: Georges Perec
- Cinematography: François Boucher
- Edited by: François Arnaud; Pierre Larocque
- Production company: Via le Monde
- Distributed by: Les Films Mutuels
- Release date: November 20, 1975
- Running time: 91 minutes
- Country: Canada
- Language: French

Ahô: The Forest People (French: Ahô... au coeur du monde primitif) is a 1975 Canadian documentary film, directed by François Floquet and Daniel Bertolino. The film is a portrait of various indigenous peoples around the world who still live in traditional forest or jungle settings rather than westernized towns and cities, including indigenous groups from Cameroon, Brazil, Indonesia and Papua New Guinea.

The film won the Canadian Film Award for Best Feature Length Documentary at the 27th Canadian Film Awards in 1976.
