= Obsessed (1987 film) =

- Genre: Drama; Romance; Thriller
- Based on: Obsessed by Tom Alderman
- Written by: Douglas Bowie; Robin Spry
- Directed by: Robin Spry
- Starring: Kerrie Keane; Daniel Pilon; Saul Rubinek; Colleen Dewhurst; Leif Anderson; Alan Thicke; Vlasta Vrána
- Music by: Jean-Alain Roussel
- Country of origin: Canada
- Original languages: English; French

Production
- Executive producer: Neil J.P. Léger
- Producers: Jamie Brown; Robin Spry
- Cinematography: Ron Stannett
- Editor: Diann Ilnicki
- Running time: 102 minutes
- Production company: Telescene Film Group Productions

Original release
- Release: 1987

Obsessed (also known as Hitting Home) is a 1987 Canadian drama film. The story is based on a novel by Tom Alderman.

== Plot ==
A Canadian mother and businesswoman Dinah Middleton (Keane) is devastated when her teenage son, Alex (Anderson), is killed by a hit-and-run driver. When the police fail to turn up any suspects, she turns private detective to track the killer down. She traces the murderer to New York City, only to discover that the crime is not covered by the extradition treaty between Canada and the US. She becomes obsessed with bringing the criminal to justice.

== Recognition ==
- 1989
  - Genie Award for Best Performance by an Actress in a Supporting Role - Colleen Dewhurst - Won
  - Genie Award for Best Achievement in Overall Sound - Don White, Gabor Vadnay, Michael Liotta, Joe Grimaldi - Nominated
  - Genie Award for Best Performance by an Actress in a Leading Role - Kerrie Keane - Nominated
  - Genie Award for Best Adapted Screenplay - Douglas Bowie, Robin Spry - Nominated
- 1988
  - Montreal World Film Festival Best Canadian Film - Robin Spry - Won
