= The Angel of Pennsylvania Avenue =

- Genre: Drama
- Written by: Rider McDowell; Michael De Guzman
- Directed by: Robert Ellis Miller
- Starring: Diana Scarwid; Robert Urich; Tegan Moss
- Music by: Simon Kendall; Al Rodger
- Country of origin: United States
- Original language: English

Production
- Executive producer: Craig Anderson
- Producers: Tom Rowe; Lisa Towers
- Production location: Vancouver
- Cinematography: David Geddes
- Editor: Robert K. Lambert
- Running time: 92 mins.
- Production companies: International Family Entertainment, Inc. Hallmark Entertainment; Craig Anderson Productions; Pacific Motion Pictures; Signboard Hill Productions

Original release
- Network: The Family Channel
- Release: December 15, 1996

The Angel of Pennsylvania Avenue is an American 1996 television film directed by Robert Ellis Miller, the last film Miller directed before his death on January 27, 2017. The film was completed days before actor Robert Urich had surgery for cancer.

== Plot ==
During the Great Depression, an unemployed Detroit man is arrested for a crime he did not commit, prompting his three children to travel over 500 miles to the White House in search of help from President Herbert Hoover in order to have their father home for Christmas.

== Cast ==
- Diana Scarwid as Annie Feagan
- Robert Urich as Angus Feagan
- Tegan Moss as Bernice Feagan
- Britt Irvin as Lily Feagan
- Alexander Pollock as Jack Feagan
- Thomas Peacocke as President Herbert Hoover

== Production ==
Filming took place in Vancouver, British Columbia during October and November 1996. Robert Urich had been diagnosed with synovial sarcoma in August 1996 and received treatments while filming was taking place; Ulrich had also completed a chemotherapy course just before he was approached to perform as Angus. Days after filming was completed Ulrich had surgery for the cancer.

== Release ==
The Angel of Pennsylvania Avenue premiered on The Family Channel on December 15, 1996. It was a co-production between the channel and Hallmark Entertainment.

== Reception ==
Radio Times gave it 2 stars, saying "Cheesy dialogue and general overacting don't help matters, though it still warms the heart when the trio are finally given their audience with President Hoover."

== See also ==
- List of Christmas films
