= Kerrie Keane =

Canadian actress (born 1948)

- Born: 1948 (age 77–78); Toronto, Canada
- Education: McMaster University
- Years active: 1981–present
- Known for: Incubus; The High Ground; Obsessed
- Spouse: Bill Momontiuk

Kerrie Lynn Keane (born 1948) is a Canadian actress.

== Early life and career ==
Born in Toronto in 1948, and raised in Waterdown, Ontario, Keane was one of three children born to John H. and Grace R. Keane. She attended Rittenhouse Public School, the Royal Academy of Music of Toronto in Hamilton, and McMaster University.

Her early film career included roles in The Incubus (1982), Spasms (1983), Morning Man (1986) and Bates Motel (1987). In 1987 she appeared in the film Obsessed and was nominated for the 1989 Genie Award for Best Performance by an Actress in a Leading Role. Keane also played the leading female role in the film Distant Thunder (1988) and appeared in the superhero film Steel (1997). She co-hosted What Will They Think of Next? with actor Joseph Campanella, and appeared on episodes of such television series as Star Trek: The Next Generation, Matlock and Beverly Hills, 90210.

== Personal life ==
On 10 September 1970, Keane married non-actor William Henry Momotiuk, whom she had met in college. They separated briefly in 1986, but, as of January 1987, had reconciled. This appears to have remained the case at least as late as October 1995, when her father died, survived by—among others—"Kerrie and her husband Willy Momotiuk of Los Angeles, Cal."

Keane was predeceased by her younger brother, John Keane, following a lengthy illness which cut short a promising operatic career.

== Filmography ==
=== Film ===
Year	Title	Role	Notes
1982	The Incubus	Laura Kincaid	
1983	Spasms	Suzanne Cavadon	
1986	The Morning Man (Un matin, une vie)	Kate Johnson	
1988	Distant Thunder	Char	
1988	Malarek	Claire	
1997	Steel	Sen. Nolan	
2008	The Lucky 7	Carrie	Short
2013	The Moment	Adele	
2015	Cracked	Theresa	Short
2016	The Accent Wall	Mom	Short

=== Television ===
Year	Title	Role	Notes
1982	Shocktrauma	Jill Jackson	TV film
1983	Trapper John, M.D.	Aphrodite	"Mother Load"
1983–84	The Yellow Rose	Caryn Cabrera	Recurring role
1984	Flight 90: Disaster on the Potomac	Carole Biggs	TV film
1984	Hot Pursuit	Kate Wyler / Cathy Ladd	Main role
1984	Slim Obsession		TV film
1985	Matt Houston	Elizabeth	"Killing Time", "Final Vows"
1985	A Death in California	Shannon Foley	TV miniseries
1985	Dirty Work	Nadine Leevanhoek	TV film
1985	Perry Mason Returns	Kathryn Gordon	TV film
1986	Kung Fu: The Movie	Mrs. Sarah Perkins	TV film
1986	Second Serve	Meriam	TV film
1986	Danger Bay	Jessica Stone	"Lady Raven"
1986	Matlock	Carla Evans	"The Stripper"
1987	Bates Motel	Barbara Peters	TV film
1987	Nightstick	Robin Malone	TV film
1987	Mistress	Margo	TV film
1988	Hitting Home	Dinah Middleton	TV film
1988	Divided We Stand	Katie Gibbs	TV film
1989	Studio 5-B	Carla Montgomery	Main role
1989	CBS Schoolbreak Special	Pat Graham	"Frog Girl: The Jennifer Graham Story"
1989	The Return of Sam McCloud	Dr. Ashley Stevens	TV film
1990	Star Trek: The Next Generation	Alexana Devos	"The High Ground"
1990	Jake and the Fatman	Morgan Steele	"Exactly Like You"
1990	In the Heat of the Night	Christine Anderson Millings	"Heart of Gold"
1991	Perry Mason: The Case of the Ruthless Reporter	Gillian Pope	TV film
1991	Murder, She Wrote	Atty. Margo Saunders	"Terminal Connection"
1991	Father Dowling Mysteries	Suzanne Preston	"The Missing Witness Mystery"
1991	Matlock	Catherine Welden	"The Celebrity"
1992	Life Goes On	Beverly Atwood	"Struck by Lightning"
1992	The House on Sycamore Street	Maggie Drummond	TV film
1993–95	Beverly Hills, 90210	Suzanne Steele	Recurring role
1994	Kung Fu: The Legend Continues	Rachel Lowry	"Temple"
1994	Diagnosis: Murder	Lydia Clayton	"Nirvana"
1994	Time Trax	Dr. Katherine Kincaid	"The Scarlet Koala"
1995	Murder, She Wrote	Audrey Young	"Film Flam"
1996	Alien Nation: Millennium	Jennifer	TV film
1996	The Perfect Daughter	Dr. Cooper	TV film
1996	A Kiss So Deadly	Patty Deese	TV film
1996	Alien Nation: The Enemy Within	Jessica	TV film
1997	Pacific Palisades	Mrs. Cruise	"The Bet", "The Other Woman"
1998	Walker, Texas Ranger	Dr. Nora Shannon	"Tribe"
1998	The Pretender	Faye	"A Stand-Up Guy"
1999	Chicago Hope	Mrs. Haskell	"Kiss of Death"
1999	A Crime of Passion	Blair Worrall	TV film
1999–2001	7th Heaven	Gillian Brenner	"We the People", "One Hundred"
2000	NYPD Blue	Joan Dickerson	"Sleep Over"
2001	JAG	Capt. Meryl Rossbach	"Measure of Men"
2002	The Nightmare Room	Mrs. Sanders	"Dear Diary, I'm Dead"
2003	Cold Case	Judy Enright	"Churchgoing People"
2004	The Guardian	Dr. Brem	"Antarctica"
2005	JAG	Comm. Lucy Maron	"Fit for Duty"
2006	Criminal Minds	Fran	"Profiler, Profiled"
2007	Shark	Barbara Seligman	"The Wrath of Khan"
2008–10	The Young and the Restless	Judge Judith Isabell	Recurring role
2009	Ghost Whisperer	Lauren Sable	"Greek Tragedy"
2009	Castle	Mrs. Davidson	"A Chill Goes Through Her Veins"
2010	NCIS	Maggie Reed	"Obsession"

== Recognition ==
- 1989 Genie Award for Best Performance by an Actress in a Leading Role – Obsessed – Nominated
