= Earle Grey =

British actor associated with early television drama

- Occupation: Actor
- Known for: Appearing in The Man with a Flower in His Mouth (1930), the first UK televised play

Earle Grey was a British-Irish actor best known for appearing in The Man with a Flower in his Mouth by Pirandello, the first televised play in the United Kingdom in 1930.

== Life and career ==
Earle Grey was born on February 4, 1892, in Dublin, Ireland. He married Mary Godwin and the couple emigrated to Canada in 1939 where they founded the Earle Grey Shakespeare Company (later known as the "Earle Grey Players"). The company performed Shakespeare plays around Canada until the late 1950s.

During his time overseas, he is also credited as an actor in inter alia Scope (1949) and Probation Officer (1959).

In 1960 the Greys left Canada, returning to England, where they continued acting right up to their deaths: Mary Godwin in 1971 and Earle Grey in 1978.

In 1972, the ACTRA Awards established the Earle Grey Award to recognise outstanding performances in Canadian television. The award was reframed as a lifetime achievement honour for television acting when the ACTRA Awards were rebranded the Gemini Awards in 1986.

== Early television pioneer ==
On 14 July 1930, Grey appeared in an experimental television broadcast of Luigi Pirandello's one-act play The Man with a Flower in His Mouth, produced for early television by Lance Sieveking using John Logie Baird's 30-line mechanical television system. Contemporary and later accounts describe this production as the first play shown on experimental television in the UK.

In Baird's recollection, the cast comprised three performers: Gladys Young, Earle Grey and Lionel Millard.
