= Love and Larceny (1985 film) =

- Genre: Biographical drama
- Written by: Douglas Bowie
- Directed by: Robert Iscove
- Starring: Jennifer Dale; Brent Carver; Kenneth Welsh
- Music by: Eric Robertson
- Country of origin: Canada
- Original language: English

Production
- Producers: John Delmage; Robert Sherrin
- Cinematography: Vic Sarin
- Editor: Ralph Brunjes
- Running time: 150 minutes
- Production company: CBC Television

Original release
- Network: CBC Television
- Release: October 6, 1985

Love & Larceny is a 1985 Canadian biographical drama television film directed by Robert Iscove and written by Douglas Bowie. The film is based on a true story and stars Jennifer Dale. The film's cast also includes Alf Humphreys, Brent Carver, Ken Pogue, Sheila McCarthy, Ross Petty, Douglas Rain, Patricia Hamilton, Susan Wright, Hugh Webster, Peter Dvorsky and Kenneth Welsh.

== Plot ==
Betsy Bigley is a Canadian confidence trickster who successfully defrauded American banks of millions of dollars by posing as the illegitimate daughter of Andrew Carnegie.

== Release ==
The film was broadcast on CBC Television on October 6, 1985.

== Awards ==
The film won the Gemini Award for Best TV Movie at the 1st Gemini Awards in 1986. It was also nominated, but did not win, in the categories of Best Supporting Actor (Rain), Best Production Design or Art Direction (Milton Parcher), Best Costume Design (Suzanne Mess) and Best Music Composition for a Single Program, Dramatic Underscore (Eric Robertson).

== Sequel ==
A sequel film, Grand Larceny, directed by Stephen Surjik and written by Bowie, was released in 1991 and focused on Bigley's escape from prison by faking her death. Bowie also later collaborated with David Archibald on a stage musical version of Bigley's story, also titled Love and Larceny.
