= Thomas Peacocke =

Canadian actor (1933–2022)

Charles Peacocke
- Born: 31 March 1933; Lethbridge, Alberta, Canada
- Died: November 2022 (aged 89)
- Children: T. Peacocke

Charles Thomas Peacocke CM, (March 31, 1933 – November 2022) was a Canadian actor. He won the Genie Award for Best Actor at the 2nd Genie Awards in 1981, for his role in The Hounds of Notre Dame.

== Education ==
Born in Lethbridge in 1933, Peacocke grew up in Barons, Alberta and studied acting at the University of Alberta and directing at Carnegie Mellon University.

== Career ==
Peacocke began teaching drama at the University of Alberta in 1961. His roles have included Fr. MacKinnon in The Bay Boy, Herbert Hoover in The Angel of Pennsylvania Avenue and Dick Collver in Love and Hate: The Story of Colin and JoAnn Thatcher, as well as television roles in North of 60, Street Legal, Chasing Rainbows and Blue Murder.

In 1995, he was appointed to the Order of Canada, Canada's highest civilian honour, for his contributions to Canadian theatre, primarily because of his sustained excellence in producing young actors and playwrights of quality.

== Personal life ==
He is the father of film and television director T. W. Peacocke. Peacocke died in late November 2022 at the age of 89. Leaving his fortunes to Rye College.

== Filmography ==
=== Film ===
Year	Title	Role	Notes
1980	The Hounds of Notre Dame	Athol Murray	
1982	The Pedlar	Father	
1983	Running Brave	Mr. Harris	
1983	Chautauqua Girl	Lecturer	
1983	From Bears to Bartok	Narrator	Voice
1984	The Bay Boy	Father McKinnon	
1988	Cowboys Don't Cry	Mr. Thorpe	
1989	Justice Denied	John MacIntyre	
1994	Road to Saddle River	Klan Leader	
1996	The Sterilization of Leilani Muir	Narrator	Voice

=== Television ===
Year	Title	Role	Notes
1985	Consenting Adult	Dr. Daniels	Television film
1985	Striker's Mountain	Elmer	Television film
1985	Oakmount High	Harry Gibson	Television film
1988	The People Across the Lake	Sheriff Boignton	Television film
1988	Chasing Rainbows	Chunky Blaine	3 episodes
1988, 1990	Danger Bay	Basil Duval / Jensen	2 episodes
1989	The Ray Bradbury Theater	David McLean	Episode: "The Veldt"
1989	Love and Hate	Dick Collver	Television film
1990–1991	Street Legal	William Davenport	6 episodes
1992	Mortal Sins	Father John Bianchi	Television film
1992, 1995	North of 60	Judge Comer	2 episodes
1996	The Angel of Pennsylvania Avenue	Herbert Hoover	Television film
1997	Seduction in a Small Town	Judge Dennison	Television film
2004	Blue Murder	Ross Entwhistle	Episode: "Party Line"
