= Hugh Webster (actor) =

Canadian actor

- Born: August 30, 1927; Edinburgh, Scotland, UK
- Died: May 31, 1986 (aged 58); Owen Sound, Ontario, Canada
- Occupation: Actor
- Years active: 1948–1986
- Spouse: Jan Campbell (m. 1952)

Hugh Webster (August 30, 1927 – May 31, 1986) was a Scottish-born Canadian actor. Webster acted on stage, in television and film.

== Biography ==
Born in Edinburgh, Webster studied art in England. Webster moved with his family to Canada in 1948. He studied drama in Toronto, and later formed his own theatre company in Oakville, Ontario.

Webster was one of the early stars of Canadian television, notably appearing as a regular cast member in "Sunshine Sketches"' and in many episodes of CBC Television drama anthologies. He regularly appeared in "The Defenders" 1960s television show in the United States. He continued to work in television throughout his career, later appearing in "A Gift to Last", "The Newcomers" and "All the Days of my Life".

He was also a frequent stage performer. Webster's early stage career began at Toronto's Crest Theatre in 1955 in Stanley Mann's The Gift of the Serpent. He also performed at the Stratford Festival, beginning in 1962 in The Taming of the Shrew, The Tempest and Cyrano de Bergerac. He was most notable playing The Fool in a 1964 production of King Lear. Webster won a Dora Mavor Moore Award for Best Featured Male Performance in 1983 for his role in Toronto Free Theatre's production of Brian Friel's Translations. He also performed at the Phoenix Theatre and the St. Lawrence Centre for the Arts in Toronto. Webster also toured with Canadian Players.

Webster also had a career in film. He was most noted for his role in the film For Gentlemen Only, for which he and his costar Ed McNamara were joint winners of the Canadian Film Award for Best Actor in a Non-Feature at the 27th Canadian Film Awards in 1976.

== Personal life ==
He married Canadian-born actress Jan Campbell in October 1952. Webster died of cancer on May 31, 1986. He was survived by his second wife, Elizabeth, five children and four step-children.

== Filmography ==
Year	Title	Role	Notes
1970	King of the Grizzlies	Shorty	
1971	The Reincarnate	Berryman	
1971	Fortune and Men's Eyes	Rabbit	
1971	Rip-Off	Mr. Duncan	
1973	Between Friends	Coker	
1975	For Gentlemen Only		(short)
1976	Find the Lady	Eddie	
1977	Who Has Seen the Wind	Ab	
1978	Drying Up the Streets	Doc	
1980	Agency	Inmate	
1980	Nothing Personal	Emerson	
1980	Crossover	Mr. Wolfe	
1981	Dirty Tricks	Mr. Darcy	
1981	The Last Chase	Fetch	
1982	If You Could See What I Hear	Sean	
1983	Never Cry Wolf	Drunk	
1985	Martin's Day	Gas Station Attendant	
1985	Bayo	Wilf Taylor	
