= Lies My Father Told Me (1975 film) =

- Directed by: Ján Kadár
- Written by: Ted Allan
- Produced by: Anthony Bedrich; Harry Gulkin
- Starring: Jeffrey Lynas; Yossi Yadin; Len Birman
- Cinematography: Paul Van der Linden; Árpád Makay
- Edited by: Edward Beyer; Richard Marks
- Music by: Sol Kaplan
- Production company: Canadian Film Development Corporation
- Distributed by: Astral Films (Canada); Columbia Pictures (International)
- Release date: September 26, 1975 (Canada)
- Running time: 102 minutes
- Country: Canada
- Language: English
- Budget: C$1,100,000
- Box office: $650,000 (Canada)

Lies My Father Told Me is a 1975 Canadian drama film made in Montreal, Quebec. It was directed by Ján Kadár and stars Jeffrey Lynas as an orthodox Jewish boy growing up in 1920s Montreal. The film received the Golden Globe Award for Best Foreign Film in 1975.

The original story was written by Ted Allan in 1949. Allan was working at an advertising agency. David Rome, editor of the Canadian Jewish Congress Bulletin, asked him to write a story.

Allan's short story is a dramatization of his own childhood memories. Allan came from a Jewish family who lived in Montreal's Mile End neighbourhood.

Lies My Father Told Me has been through many reincarnations since its original publication, as a radio play and a Golden Globe-winning film.

The original short story was picked up by producer Harry Gulkin. Gulkin candidly told the Montreal Gazette, "I really didn't know what I was doing, but then nobody knew I didn't know what I was doing". The film has become celebrated for its message that relationships can deeply transcend generations through the connection between its two main characters. Marilyn Lightstone, who portrays a lead character, also comments on the film's ability to engage with a mass audience. Lightstone told the Montreal Gazette in 2011 that she was unsurprised that Lies still widely resonated with viewers nearly 45 years after its debut. Lightstone states, "It is essentially a family story with the most primal set of conflicts you can come upon. It's why Oedipus and Hamlet still resonate. It's a universal theme".

== Plot ==
David is a six-year-old boy in a Jewish ghetto of Montreal in the 1920s. He lives with his parents Harry and Annie and his grandfather Zaida, a rag-and-bone man who collects rags and bottles on his horse, Ferdeleh, and wagon—while also studying the Talmud and claiming it as the only book he has read. David loves riding with his grandfather, and shares Zaida's love for his Ferdeleh, despite the horse's age and the neighbour Mrs. Tannenbaum's complaints as to the smell. Zaida jokes about covering Mrs. Tannenbaum's steps with horse excrement, an idea that delights David, who takes it seriously. While Zaida's friend Mr. Baumgarten embraces the ideas of Karl Marx to end social class injustice, Zaida replies he is instead looking to the arrival of the messiah to end all injustice.

Harry, who is not religious, designs a pair of trousers meant to be impossible to crease, and appeals to Zaida for $500 in investment, claiming he already has many orders for the product and will be able to pay back with interest in one month. When Harry demonstrates his "pressless trousers", his own business partner points out the bulges in the knees, spoiling any chance Zaida will invest. Enraged, Harry rants about marrying into an unintelligent family, condemns Zaida as a miser and not a real Orthodox Jew, and says Ferdeleh should be killed. David overhears these threats made by his father and is disturbed and embarrassed for the way he has spoken of his family, particularly Zaida. In attempt to comfort his grandfather, David informs Zaida that his father tells "terrible lies".

While David hopes to ride with Zaida on another Sunday, Harry insists instead on taking David fishing. However, Harry actually takes David to a gambling club, and talks of leaving the ghetto behind. With orders on the defective trousers cancelled, Harry goes into bankruptcy and the family's plans to move are cancelled, to David's joy. Annie gives birth to David's baby brother, and David becomes jealous his brother gets to breastfeed. Finally disillusioned with the deceptions of all adults, David covers Mrs. Tannenbaum's steps with horse excrement. The police arrive and discover Zaida's stable is in violation of bylaws requiring stables to be located 100 yards from residences. The police give Zaida 30 days to move it, but he resolves not to. He instead becomes gravely ill, and David is sent to his uncle to avoid a spread of the illness. When he returns, Harry tells David that Zaida and Ferdeleh have both died. Distressed, David runs from home and imagines his grandfather returning.

== Cast ==
- Yossi Yadin as Zaida
- Len Birman as Harry Herman
- Marilyn Lightstone as Annie Herman
- Jeffery Lynas as David Herman
- Ted Allan as Mr. Baumgarten
- Henry Gamer as Uncle Benny
- Barbara Chilcott as Mrs. Tannenbaum
- Carole Lazare as Edna
- Mignon Elkins as Mr. Bondy
- Cleo Paskal as Cleo

== Production ==
Lies My Father Told Me was entirely filmed in Montreal. The Film's use of Mount Royal and The Plateau has been widely appreciated by audiences for these locations' "stunning" visual aesthetics. Telefilm Canada, formerly known as the Canadian Film Development Corporation, is the Crown Corporation that produced the film and is fittingly headquartered in Montreal. Lies My Father Told Me was produced just a year before the CFDC's annual budget was increased to $25 million by the Federal Government of Canada.

== Reception ==
Producer Harry Gulkin believes that the film's strong reception within the Jewish Mile Neighbourhood in Montreal is due to its considerable "local sensibility". However, he states that in addition to this evident ability in capturing local communities, the film entails very basic, universal ideas and messages that are "recognizable to audiences everywhere". The film has been appreciated for providing a diverse, deep portrayal of Montreal, significantly contrasting with traditional depictions of "La Belle Ville". Jeffery Lynas, who makes his film debut in Lies My Father Told Me, has been acclaimed for portraying "innocence, love, and genuine conviction". The film has been described by the New York Times as not being about lies, but rather "the harsh truths the boy cannot understand or accept", in reference to Lynas' character. Leslie Halliwell wrote: "Effectively if rather dishonestly sentimental ..." Leonard Maltin gave the film three and a half of four stars: "Tender film about young boy in Canadian-Jewish ghetto of the 1920s who idolizes his grandfather ... Simple and moving drama."

Lies My Father Told Me has been adapted into a stage musical. The Montreal-based Dora Wasserman Yiddish Theatre produced the first and one of the most well-received musicals of Lies My Father Told Me. The first version of the musical was produced by Dora Wasserman at the Segal Centre in 1984. The musical was then adapted by Dora's daughter, Bryna, into the production it is today. The production, which made its debut in June 2005, uses a cast of just above 30 members and has been praised for "making nostalgia and sentiment work in a big way". The theatre production includes the construction of over 12 original songs to portray Allan's plot.

The film was the highest-grossing Canadian film in Canada for the year, with a gross of $650,000, winning the inaugural Golden Reel Award.

== Awards ==
- Academy Award nominee for Best Screenplay
- Canadian Film Awards – Film of the Year, Adapted Screenplay, Actress (Marilyn Lightstone), Sound
- Golden Reel Award
- Golden Globes – Best Foreign Film
