= Empire, Inc. =

- Genre: Drama
- Written by: Douglas Bowie
- Directed by: Douglas Jackson; Denys Arcand
- Composer: Neil Chotem
- Country of origin: Canada
- No. of seasons: 1
- No. of episodes: 6

Production
- Executive producer: Mark Blandford
- Producer: Paul Risacher
- Cinematography: Alain Dostie

Original release
- Network: CBC Television; Télévision de Radio-Canada
- Release: January 9 – February 13, 1983

Empire, Inc. is a six-episode Canadian television miniseries that aired on CBC Television in English and Télévision de Radio-Canada in French in 1983. Spanning from the 1920s to the 1960s, the series centred on the family of James Munroe (Kenneth Welsh), a wealthy anglophone business tycoon in Montreal.

The series is a co-production of CBC Television, Télévision de Radio-Canada and the National Film Board. It was directed by Douglas Jackson and Denys Arcand, with each directing three of the six episodes.

The cast also includes Martha Henry, Jennifer Dale, Mitch Martin, Peter Dvorsky, Linda Griffiths, Pamela Redfern, Joseph Ziegler, Donald Pilon, Lyn Jackson and Gabriel Arcand.

The series garnered six ACTRA Award nominations in 1984, including Best Actor for Welsh, Best Actress for both Griffiths and Henry, Best Supporting Performer nods for Gabriel Arcand and Lyn Jackson and a Best Writing for Douglas Bowie. Welsh, Griffiths, Arcand and Bowie won their awards.
