= Peter Dvorsky (actor) =

Canadian actor (1948–2019)

Peter Dvorsky (August 27, 1948 – March 2, 2019) was a Canadian actor. He was most noted for his role as Harlan in the film Videodrome, for which he was a Genie Award nominee for Best Supporting Actor at the 5th Genie Awards in 1984.

Predominantly a stage actor in his early career, he had roles in productions of Uncle Vanya, A Life in the Theatre, Saint Joan, Born Yesterday, Long Day's Journey into Night and The Philadelphia Story.

His most noted television role was as Jimmy, the son of Kenneth Welsh's James Munroe, in the miniseries Empire, Inc.. He also had guest roles in the television series Seeing Things, Hangin' In, The Littlest Hobo, Adderly, Beverly Hills Buntz, Mom P.I. and Street Legal, and appeared in the television films Charlie Grant's War, Bridge to Terabithia, Murder in Space, The Park Is Mine, Love and Larceny, Sword of Gideon and Race for the Bomb. He also had small roles in the films The Dead Zone, Casual Sex?, The Kiss, Twins, Millennium and Mesmer.

He was married to actress Rosemary Dunsmore.
