= The Burning Season (1993 film) =

1993 film by Harvey Crossland

- Directed by: Harvey Crossland
- Starring: Akesh Gill; Jasminder K. Rattan; Om Puri; Dale Azzard
- Release date: 1993
- Country: Canada
- Languages: English, Hindi

The Burning Season is a 1993 Canadian film directed by Harvey Crossland. The film stars Akesh Gill, Jasminder K. Rattan, Om Puri and Dale Azzard. The plot concerns a young Indo-Canadian wife and mother who runs away to India in pursuit of her lover.
