= The High Ground (Star Trek: The Next Generation) =

- Star Trek: The Next Generation episode
- Episode no.: Season 3 Episode 12
- Directed by: Gabrielle Beaumont
- Written by: Melinda M. Snodgrass
- Cinematography by: Marvin Rush
- Production code: 160
- Original air date: January 29, 1990

Guest appearances
- Kerrie Keane as Alexana Devos; Richard Cox as Kyril Finn; Marc Buckland as Katik Shaw; Fred G. Smith as Policeman; Christopher Pettiet as Boy

Episode chronology
← Previous "The Hunted"	Next → "Deja Q"
- Star Trek: The Next Generation season 3

"The High Ground" is the 12th episode of the third season of the American science fiction television series Star Trek: The Next Generation, the 60th episode of the series. Set in the 24th century, the series follows the adventures of the Starfleet crew of the Federation starship Enterprise-D. In this episode, a crew member of the Federation starship Enterprise is taken hostage by terrorists who hope Federation involvement will help them win concessions for their cause. Due to a line about Irish reunification, the episode was initially not broadcast in the United Kingdom and the Republic of Ireland.

== Plot ==
The crew of the Enterprise is sent on a mercy mission to deliver medical supplies to the war-torn non-affiliated planet Rutia IV, in the middle of a decades-long conflict with rebel separatists called the Ansata. The Enterprise crew cannot intervene in the conflict itself. While Chief Medical Officer Dr. Crusher, Commander Data, and Lieutenant Worf relax in a cafe, a bomb goes off in a public plaza, injuring many bystanders. Dr. Crusher attempts to tend to the wounded, against Captain Picard's request to return to the ship, but her efforts are interrupted when she is abducted by a man using an unknown method of teleportation. After being denied the use of the Enterprise's superior firepower to seek and destroy the Ansata's base of operations, the head of Rutian security, Alexana Devos, orders severe interrogation of all known Ansata sympathizers, an act that the Enterprise crew find immoral. Without new information from Devos, the Enterprise crew investigate the teleportation technology and find that it is used to shift between dimensions, allowing the Ansata rebels to bypass even force fields. The investigative team, which includes Crusher's son Wesley, lets Picard know that observing more teleportations will enable them to pinpoint the location of the Ansata base.

At the base, Crusher learns her abductor is Kyril Finn, the leader of Ansata. Crusher refuses to eat or otherwise cooperate with Finn. After several hours, Finn lets Crusher out of her restraints and requests that she help treat their wounded. Crusher discovers that the "Inverters", the Ansata teleportation technology, cause irreversible damage to the user's DNA, and that many of the Ansata are sick due to excessive use of the Inverter. Finn admits that the Inverter is their only advantage against the Rutian government. Finn believes that the Federation, by providing medical aid, is working with the Rutian government, and launches an attack on the Enterprise, despite Crusher's pleas not to harm her son. The Ansata manage to plant a bomb on the Enterprise's warp core not before killing several members of the crew in the process. Chief Engineer La Forge is able to remove the bomb and transport it into space, but the distraction is enough to allow Finn to appear on the bridge and abduct Captain Picard. With Picard as his captive, Finn uses the Inverter to return to the Enterprise to convey to Counselor Troi his demand that the Federation mediate the dispute between the Ansata and the Rutians; he leaves again before security officers can arrive. Picard, learning of Crusher's situation, tells her to continue to work on gaining Finn's confidence to hopefully end the dispute peacefully.

Data and Wesley are able to use Finn's appearance to locate the Ansata base, and Commander Riker and Devos assemble their forces. After they transport into the base, the combined forces are quickly able to quell the resistance. Finn, as a last resort, attempts to execute Picard, but Devos kills him. She contends that if Finn remained alive, his imprisonment would spark more resistance, while being killed in battle will elevate him to martyr status but reduce the violence in the short term. When a young Ansata member attempts to exact revenge on Devos, Crusher is able to convince him to drop his weapon, which Riker notes is a sign that there may be more fruitful discussions to resolve the issue in the future.

== United Kingdom and Republic of Ireland broadcast ==
According to a BBC "Screening Report" dated 1 July 1991, while the episode attempted "to present the moral dilemmas" around "terrorism and the inability of the authorities to come to terms with it", there were "obvious parallels with Northern Ireland and the Middle East that could make for distinct discomfort in scheduling". In addition to Data's reference to terrorist-inspired Irish reunification in 2024, there were also more general concerns about the level of violence in the episode (including "indiscriminate shooting on the Enterprise (3 dead) and on the planet", given that it would be broadcast at 6pm, quite possibly close to Christmas.

Consequently, the BBC decided not to screen 'The High Ground' because "it would be insensitive at this particular time in view of the current situation in Northern Ireland", known as the Troubles. It was not broadcast in the Republic of Ireland by the Star Trek rights' holder, RTÉ, during the show's initial run, though subsequent UK broadcasts were received there. Initial UK airings were edited and shown for the first time on the satellite channel Sky One on November 29, 1992. The episode was broadcast unedited in May 2006 on Sky One and finally shown unedited on BBC Two during the third season's repeats after midnight on September 29, 2007.

Pearson and Davies write that 'The High Ground' showed that "television drama, rather than unproblematically reflecting dominant assumptions, can debate and sometimes challenge them". The episode's writer, Melinda M. Snodgrass, states that 'The High Ground' is an example of how "science fiction is incredibly important because it allows people to discuss difficult topics - but at arm's length". Snodgrass wanted the episode to consider that "one man's freedom fighter is another man's terrorist" and ask questions such as "when do people feel like their back is so much against the wall that they have no choice but to turn to violence? And is that actually ever justified?".

== Releases ==
The episode was released with Star Trek: The Next Generation season three DVD box set, released in the United States on July 2, 2002. This had 26 episodes of Season 3 on seven discs, with a Dolby Digital 5.1 audio track. It was released in high-definition Blu-ray in the United States on April 30, 2013.

The episode was released in Japan on LaserDisc on July 5, 1996, in the half season set Log. 5: Third Season Part.1 by CIC Video. This included episodes up to "A Matter of Perspective" on 12-inch double sided optical discs. The video was in NTSC format with both English and Japanese audio tracks.

== Reception ==
In a 2010 review, Zack Handlen of The A.V. Club gave the episode a grade B−. Keith R.A. DeCandido gave the episode 7 out of 10.
