= Canada's Sweetheart: The Saga of Hal C. Banks =

- Written by: Donald Brittain; Richard Nielsen
- Directed by: Donald Brittain
- Starring: Maury Chaykin
- Narrated by: Donald Brittain
- Music by: Eldon Rathburn
- Country of origin: Canada
- Original language: English

Production
- Producers: Donald Brittain; Adam Symansky
- Cinematography: Andreas Poulsson
- Editors: Rita Roy; Richard Todd
- Running time: 115 minutes
- Production company: National Film Board of Canada

Original release
- Network: CBC Television
- Release: October 27, 1985

Canada's Sweetheart: The Saga of Hal C. Banks is a Canadian docudrama film directed, written and produced by Donald Brittain.

The film was about Hal C. Banks, a controversial American labour union leader who came to Canada in 1949 to help bust the purportedly Communist-controlled Canadian Seaman's Union and establish the Seafarers International Union as their replacement. Banks left Canada in 1962 after being brought up on criminal charges. Banks appeared before the Norris Commission, which was set up to investigate his strongarm tactics and links to beatings of opposition unions, and non signed shipping companies. In particular was the ULS and the Maritime Union run by his former lieutenant Michael Sheehan, who had testified before the Norris Commission against Banks, and led the push to loosen the SIU grip on the Great Lakes.

Maury Chaykin played the role of Banks in dramatic reenactments, alongside a supporting cast that included Peter Boretski, Jason Dean, Marie-Hélène Fontaine, Colin Fox, Sean McCann, Gary Reineke, Larry Reynolds, Chuck Shamata, Barry Stevens, R. H. Thomson and Jonathan Welsh.

The film premiered at the 1985 Festival of Festivals, but was distributed primarily as a CBC Television broadcast rather than theatrically. It was broadcast by CBC on October 27, 1985.

== Awards ==
Award	Date of ceremony	Category	Recipient(s)	Result	Ref(s)
Festival of Festivals	1985	Best Canadian Film	Canada's Sweetheart: The Saga of Hal C. Banks	Won	
ACTRA Awards	April 2, 1986	Best Television Program	Canada's Sweetheart: The Saga of Hal C. Banks	Nominated	
ACTRA Awards	April 2, 1986	Best Direction in a Television Program	Donald Brittain	Won	
ACTRA Awards	April 2, 1986	Best Television Actor	Maury Chaykin	Won	
ACTRA Awards	April 2, 1986	Best Writing, Original Television Drama	Donald Brittain, Richard Nielsesn	Nominated	
Gemini Awards	December 4, 1986	Best Writing in a Dramatic Program	Donald Brittain, Richard Nielsesn	Won	
Gemini Awards	December 4, 1986	Best Direction in a Dramatic Series	Donald Brittain	Won	
Gemini Awards	December 4, 1986	Best Actor in a Dramatic Program or Miniseries	Maury Chaykin	Nominated	
Gemini Awards	December 4, 1986	Best Supporting Actor	R. H. Thomson	Nominated	
