= Leueen Willoughby =

Canadian former actress (born 1949)

Anne Leueen Willoughby (born 9 June 1949) is a Canadian former actress. Her father was a representative of the Guinness family who helped supervise the construction of the Lions Gate Bridge and extensive housing developments on Vancouver's North Shore. She attended the University of British Columbia in Vancouver, and later graduated from the Bristol Old Vic's theater school.

== Background ==
In 1975, she played Magenta in The Rocky Horror Show at the Kings Road Theatre in London. Two of her most notable roles are Barbara in Omen III: The Final Conflict (1981), and Leueen (a character who took on the actress' name during production), Lois Lane's fellow Daily Planet reporter in Superman II (1980). Her character, incidentally, is not present in Richard Donner's version of the Superman movie. Willoughby also appeared in a small role in the first Superman movie, playing an unnamed secretary, and was one of the voice actors who worked on the original BBC radio production of The Hitchhiker's Guide to the Galaxy, amongst other roles in British and Canadian theater, film and television. In 1986, she won the ACTRA Award as Best Television Actress for her performance as a young woman battling cancer in the CBC miniseries The Other Kingdom.

== Filmography ==
Year	Title	Role	Notes
1978	Superman	2nd Secretary (Daily Planet)	
1980	Superman II	Leueen	
1981	Omen III: The Final Conflict	Barbara Dean	
