= Ted Allan =

Canadian writer (1916–1995)

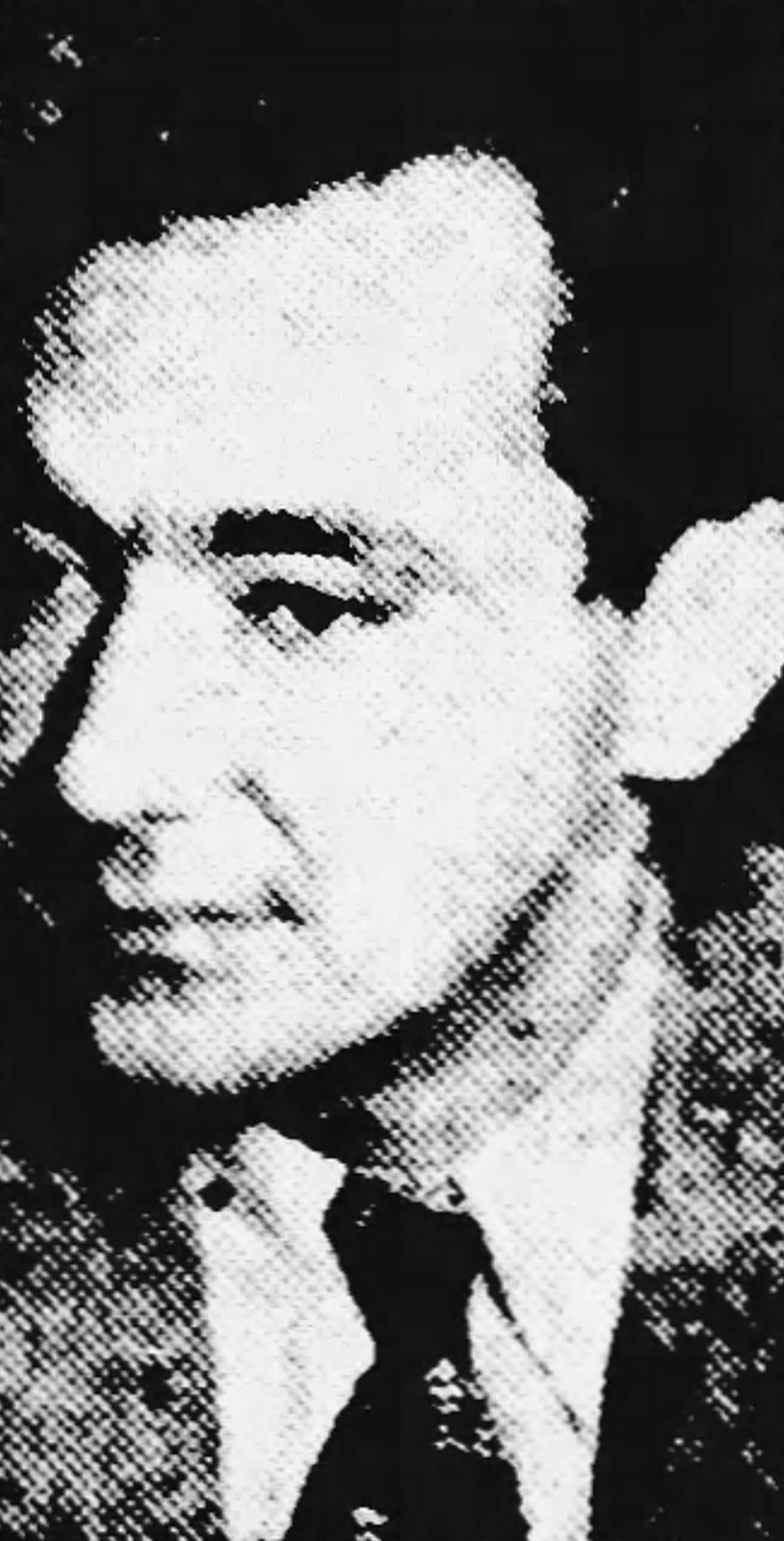
Allan c. 1947

Alan Herman (January 26, 1916 – June 29, 1995), known professionally as Ted Allan, was a Canadian screenwriter, author, and poet, several of whose books were made into motion pictures. In 1975, he received a nomination for the Academy Award for Best Writing (Original Screenplay) and won a Golden Globe for Best Foreign Film for the film Lies My Father Told Me.

== Biography ==
Ted Allan was born in Montreal as Alan Herman.

In 1934 he met and became friends with Norman Bethune. In February 1937 Allan joined Lincoln Battalion of the International Brigades to fight against fascism in Spanish Civil War. At the direction of the Brigade, Ted worked as a reporter—he broadcast to America from Madrid—and worked again with Bethune. In 1939 he published his first novel, This Time a Better Earth, drawing on his experiences in the War.

In 1952, Allan and Sydney Gordon published Bethune's biography, The Scalpel, The Sword. Allan battled for nearly 40 years to make a movie about the Canadian surgeon who became a larger-than-life hero of the Chinese Communist Revolution. The film, Bethune: The Making of a Hero, for which Allan wrote the screenplay, was the first official Chinese co-production, shooting in China, Montreal and Spain was released in 1990. It starred Donald Sutherland and Helen Mirren.

Allan co-wrote the script for John Cassavetes's celebrated movie Love Streams (released in 1984), which won the Golden Bear Award at Berlin International Film Festival. The film was based on one of Allan's plays, I've Seen You Cut Lemons, which was directed by Sean Connery at the Fortune Theatre in London in 1969. (Note: In February 1966, the Associated Press had reported that Connery was planning to direct a revival of Allan's 1958 play, The Secret of the World, which was to star Shelley Winters, but the production never materialized.)

Allan won the Stephen Leacock Award in 1985 for his novel Love Is a Long Shot.

He died of respiratory failure on June 29, 1995 at the age of 79. He is the subject of the 2002 National Film Board documentary Ted Allan: Minstrel Boy of the Twentieth Century.

== Work ==
Ted Allan's credits include:

=== Plays ===
- The Ghost Writers (Toronto 1952) retitled The Money Makers (London 1955)
- Double Image with Roger MacDougal (London 1955 ) reworked, with Gabriel Arout, as Gog et Magog (Paris 1959/62)
- Double Image (1957)
- Legend of Pepito (London 1955)
- The Secret of the World (London 1958)
- I've Seen You Cut Lemons (London 1969)
- My Sister's Keeper (1974)
- Love Streams (Los Angeles 1981)
- The Third Day Comes (Los Angeles 1981)
- Willie the Squowse (Toronto 1987/8)
- Chu Chem (New York 1988)

=== Films ===
- Lies My Father Told Me (1975)
- Love Streams (1984)
- Bethune: The Making of a Hero (1990)

=== Books ===
- This Time a Better Earth (1939)
- The Scalpel, the Sword: The Story of Doctor Norman Bethune (1952) with Sydney Gorden
- Willie the Squowse (1977)
- Love is a Long Shot (1984)
- Don't You Know Anybody Else (1985)

He also published short stories in Harper's, The New Yorker, and other magazines.
