= Nicky Guadagni =

Canadian actress

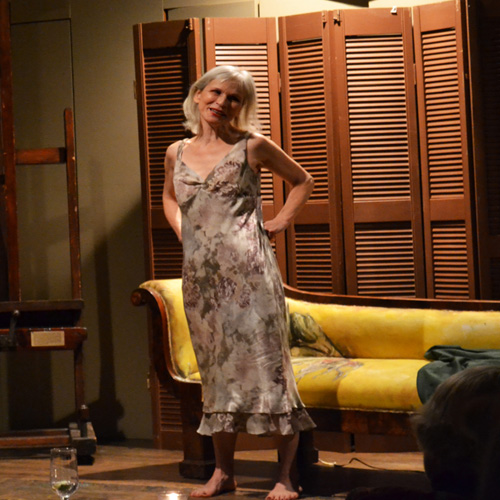
- Guadagni as Zelda Fitzgerald in Hooked: The Play in 2013
- Born: January 1 1965; Montreal, Quebec, Canada
- Occupation: Actress
- Years active: 1984–present

Nicky Guadagni is a Canadian actress who has worked on stage, radio, film, and television.

== Early life and education ==
Originally from Montreal, Canada, Nicky Guadagni majored in drama at Dawson College and went on to train at the Royal Academy of Dramatic Art in London.

== Career ==
Guadagni's first role after graduation was playing Miranda, with Paul Scofield as Prospero, in a production of The Tempest in the West End of London. Her theatre work in Canada includes A Midsummer Night's Dream at Stratford Third Stage; Zastrozzi and Criminal Genius at the Factory Theatre; Hamlet and Mother Courage for the National Arts Centre; The Seagull and The Member of the Wedding at Tarragon Theatre; and OD on Paradise at Theatre Passe Muraille.

Guadagni has been nominated for five Gemini Awards for her work on television, and received the award in 1998 (Best Supporting Actress, Major Crime) and 2004 (Best Actress in a Guest Role, Blue Murder, "Eyewitness"). She was a mainstay of the repertory cast of the A&E Network's A Nero Wolfe Mystery (2001–2002), playing no fewer than 13 highly varied roles in the course of the TV series and the pilot, The Golden Spiders: A Nero Wolfe Mystery (2000). She also played a leading role in cult sci-fi film Cube in 1997.

In 2002 Guadagni made her playwriting debut with In the Wings, adapted from the 1998 novel by Carole Corbeil, which she performed at Toronto's Theatre Passe Muraille. In 2011 an abbreviated version of her seven-character, one-person show Hooked, written by Carolyn Smart, was part of Toronto's Summerworks Theatre Festival schedule, with performances at Theatre Passe Muraille Backspace.

Guadagni taught voice and scene study for five years at George Brown College as well as at the University College Drama Program in Toronto, Ontario, and has also worked at the National Theatre School of Canada in Montreal. She has provided coaching and dramatic training for clients of the firm The Humphrey Group since 1995.

In 2019, she played the demented matriarch Helene Le Domas in the horror film Ready or Not.

== Awards ==
- 1985, Nominee, Gemini Award
  Turning to Stone
  Best Performance by an Actress in a Lead Role
  Academy of Canadian Cinema and Television
- 1988, Nominee, Gemini Award
  The Squamish Five
  Best Performance by an Actress in a Supporting Role
  Academy of Canadian Cinema and Television
- 1996, Nominee, Gemini Award
  Performance! Saying It
  Best Performance by an Actress in a Lead Role in a Dramatic Program or Miniseries
  Academy of Canadian Cinema and Television
- 1998, Winner, Gemini Award
  Major Crime
  Best Performance by an Actress in a Supporting Role
  Academy of Canadian Cinema and Television
- 2004, Winner, Gemini Award
  Blue Murder (episode "Eyewitness")
  Best Performance by an Actress in a Guest Role in a Dramatic Series
  Academy of Canadian Cinema and Television

== Filmography ==
List of acting performances in film and television
| Year | Title | Role | Notes |
|---|---|---|---|
| 1984 | A Matter of Sex | Mary | TV |
| 1985 | Turning to Stone | Allison Campbell | TV, Gemini Award nominee |
| 1988 | The Squamish Five | Ann Hansen | TV, Gemini Award nominee |
| 1989 | The Twilight Zone | Records Clerk | TV series, episode: "The Cold Equations" |
| 1990 | White Room | Narrator | |
| 1990 | Street Legal | Carol Tait | TV series, episode "Tyger, Tyger" |
| 1991 | A Little Piece of Heaven | Helen Olander | TV |
| 1991–1993 | Street Legal | Anita Graham | TV series, episodes "Eye of the Beholder" "Forgiveness" "Conduct Unbecoming" "The Price" |
| 1992 | Road to Avonlea | Female Worker #1 | TV series, episode "Aunt Janet Rebels" |
| 1993 | Bonds of Love | Karen Turney | TV |
| 1993 | E.N.G. | Mary Callahan | TV series, episodes "One False Step" "Legacy" |
| 1994 | My Breast | Dr. Petrek | TV |
| 1994 | Forever Knight | Elizabeth Tretheway | TV series, episode "Hunted" |
| 1995 | Friends at Last | Maine Nurse | TV |
| 1995 | House | | |
| 1995 | The Possession of Michael D. | The Neurologist | TV |
| 1995 | Due South | Judge Shore | TV series, episode "The Witness" |
| 1996 | Side Effects | Dr. Hagerty | TV series, episode "Behind the Scenes" |
| 1996 | Crash | Tattooist | |
| 1996 | Undue Influence | Postal Supervisor | TV |
| 1996 | We the Jury | Beryl Granger | TV |
| 1996 | Under the Piano | Miss Evans | TV |
| 1996 | Performance! Saying It | | TV, Gemini Award nominee |
| 1996 | Buried Secrets | Librarian | TV |
| 1996 | Hidden in America | Hospital Administrator | TV |
| 1997 | Cube | Dr. Helen Holloway | |
| 1997 | Rescuers: Stories of Courage: Two Women | Lydia Stolowitsky | "Mamusha" |
| 1997 | Goosebumps (TV series) | Marta Blackwell | "Werewolf Skin" |
| 1997 | Johnny 2.0 | Nurse | TV |
| 1997 | Major Crime | Denice | TV, Gemini Award |
| 1998 | Sleeping Dogs Lie | Sister Rosaria | |
| 1998 | Blind Faith | Margaret O'Neill | |
| 1998 | My Father's Shadow: The Sam Sheppard Story | Conservative Debater | TV |
| 1998 | Mythic Warriors: Guardians of the Legend | Princess Danae (voice) | TV series, episode "Perseus: The Search for Medusa" |
| 1999 | Storm of the Century | Jenna Freeman | TV miniseries |
| 1999 | Ricky Nelson: Original Teen Idol | Donna Fontana | TV |
| 1999 | Foolish Heart | Nurse | TV series, episode "The Critic" |
| 1999 | Forget Me Never | Patient No. 2 | TV |
| 2000 | A Taste of Shakespeare | Titania/Narrator | TV series, episode "A Midsummer Night's Dream" |
| 2000 | The Golden Spiders: A Nero Wolfe Mystery | Angela Wright | TV |
| 2000 | Dirty Pictures | Kardon | TV |
| 2000 | The Last Debate | Sam Minter | TV |
| 2001–2002 | A Nero Wolfe Mystery | Mrs. Ivana Althaus; Elaine Usher; Viola Duday; Mrs. Perry Porter Jerome; Jeanne Miltan; Mrs. Avery Ballou; Alice Hart; Actress (uncredited); Fabian's Girl; Mrs. Cramer/Secretary; Tina Vardas | TV series, episodes "The Doorbell Rang" "Champagne for One" "Prisoner's Base" "Christmas Party" "Over My Dead Body" "Death of a Doxy" "The Next Witness" "Poison à la Carte" "Before I Die" "The Silent Speaker" "Cop Killer" |
| 2002 | Salem Witch Trials | Elizabeth Proctor | TV |
| 2003 | Queer as Folk | Dean of Financial Services | TV series, episode 3.2 |
| 2004 | Snakes and Ladders | Sara-Jane Hardacre | TV series, episode "The Bling Bling" |
| 2004 | The Eleventh Hour | Nurse | TV series, episode "Swimmers" |
| 2004 | Doc | Lily/Bonnie Fisher | TV series, episode "Searching for Bonnie Fisher" |
| 2004 | Blue Murder | Alison Stasiak | TV series, episode "Eyewitness"; Gemini Award |
| 2005 | Beethoven's Hair | Narrator | TV |
| 2006 | Appassionata | Dr. Eckhardt's Assistant | |
| 2006 | Beautiful People | Sondra Ritchey | TV series, episode "Flashback to the Future" |
| 2006 | Silent Hill | Eleanor | |
| 2006 | Booky Makes Her Mark | Mrs. MacDonald | TV |
| 2006 | The Path to 9/11 | Mary Jo White | TV |
| 2006 | Absolution | Myra Lloyd | TV |
| 2006 | Angela's Eyes | Rebecca | TV series, episode "Eyes on the Prize" |
| 2006 | Why I Wore Lipstick to My Mastectomy | Photographer | TV |
| 2007 | Lars and the Real Girl | Mrs. Petersen | |
| 2019 | Ready or Not | Helene Le Domas | |
| 2023 | Star Trek: Strange New Worlds | Admiral Javas | TV series, episode "Ad Astra Per Aspera" |
