= Allan Kroeker =

Canadian film and television director

Allan Kroeker (born April 10, 1951, in Winnipeg, Manitoba) is a Canadian film and television director, cinematographer, screenwriter, film editor and film producer. He has the distinction of directing the series finales for Star Trek: Deep Space Nine, Star Trek: Voyager and Star Trek: Enterprise. He has also directed TV movies and episodic television, including Tramp at the Door.

Kroeker grew up in Winnipeg where he began his career producing films for the Mennonite Brethren Church and the Mennonite Central Committee.
