= 4th ACTRA Awards =

Canadian television awards ceremony

- Date: April 23, 1975
- Hosted by: Pierre Berton

Highlights
- Best TV or Radio Program: Next Year in Jerusalem

Television/radio coverage
- Network: CBC Television

The 4th ACTRA Awards were presented on April 23, 1975. The ceremony was hosted by Pierre Berton.

Due to the cancellation of the Canadian Film Awards in 1974, ACTRA opted to present selected film awards for the first time, with a dedicated award for best film actor and the awards for dramatic and documentary writing opened to both television and theatrical film productions; however, with the Canadian Film Awards returning in 1975, this was not maintained in future years.

The 1975 ceremony also marked the first time that ACTRA presented an award for Best Program rather than solely honouring individuals; a single award was presented inclusive of both television and radio programs this year, with separate categories for television and radio programming introduced at the 5th ACTRA Awards in 1976. Additionally, the 1975 awards marked the introduction of the Foster Hewitt Award for television sportscasting; this year it was presented as a lifetime achievement award, separately from the existing award for television sportscasting within the previous broadcast year, but they were merged into a single award in future years.

In 1978, The Globe and Mail revealed for the first time an unconfirmed but longstanding industry rumour that if Lloyd Robertson had won the award for Best News Broadcaster, elements in the audience were planning to pie him in the face just to see if they could cause the normally unflappable Robertson to lose his composure.

== Winners and nominees ==
Best Television or Radio Program	Best Television Actor
Next Year in Jerusalem — Harry Rasky; Back to Beulah; Jack	William Hutt, The National Dream; Michael Kane, The Collaborators; Patrick Watson, Witness to Yesterday
Best Film Actor	Best Radio Actor
Stuart Gillard, Why Rock the Boat?; Ken James, Why Rock the Boat?; Henry Ramer, The Apprenticeship of Duddy Kravitz	Ron Hartmann, Othello; Colin Fox, Lingard; Sean Mulcahy, The Art of Liam O'Flaherty
Best Television Public Affairs Broadcaster	Best Radio Public Affairs Broadcaster
Helen Hutchinson, Canada AM; Adrienne Clarkson, Adrienne at Large; Carole Taylor, W5	Barbara Frum, As It Happens; Harry Brown, Metro Morning; Betty Kennedy, The Betty Kennedy Show
Best News Broadcaster	Best Sportscaster
Michael Maclear; Lloyd Robertson; Joe Schlesinger	Don Chevrier; Pat Marsden; Fred Sgambati
Best Writing, Television or Film Drama	Best Writing, Radio Drama
Mordecai Richler and Lionel Chetwynd, The Apprenticeship of Duddy Kravitz; Len Peterson, The Executioners; W. O. Mitchell, Back to Beulah	W. O. Mitchell, Back to Beulah; Peter Haworth, The Seas Between Us; George Salverson, The Expropriated: A Matter of Irrelevance
Best Writing, Television or Film Documentary	Best Writing, Radio Documentary
Timothy Findley and William Whitehead, The National Dream; Harry Rasky, Next Year in Jerusalem; Martin Bronstein, Michael Magee, John Morgan, Paul Robin and Hugh Webster, True North: "The Myth"	Leo Dufault, Two Oranges and a Handful of Nuts; William Fulton, Of Dorys and Dorymen; Warren Wilson, The Road to War
Best Television or Radio Variety Performance	Gordon Sinclair Award
The Irish Rovers, The Irish Rovers in Cork; Dave Broadfoot, Royal Canadian Air Farce; Patrick Rose, Inside Canada	Jack Webster; Gordon Atkinson; Ben Metcalfe
John Drainie Award	Foster Hewitt Award
Robert Weaver	Bill Good Sr.
