= 7th ACTRA Awards =

Canadian television awards ceremony

- Date: March 22, 1978
- Hosted by: Gordon Pinsent

Highlights
- Best TV Program: Aberfan
- Best Radio Program: A Bite of the Big Apple

Television/radio coverage
- Network: CBC Television

The 7th ACTRA Awards were presented on March 22, 1978. The ceremony was hosted by Gordon Pinsent.

== Winners and nominees ==
Best Television Program	Best Radio Program
Aberfan; Bethune; Connections: An Investigation into Organized Crime in Canada	A Bite of the Big Apple; As It Happens; Journey to a Still Point in the Turning Earth
Best Television Actor	Best Radio Actor
Donald Sutherland, Bethune; Anne Anglin, Ada; Jan Rubeš, The Day My Granddad Died	Joan Gregson, The Path; Terence Labrosse, The Outsider; Florence Paterson, John and the Missus
Best Supporting TV Performance	Best Children's Television Program
Les Carlson, Raku Fire; Jayne Eastwood, Ada; Joan Karasevich, The Day My Granddad Died	Mr. Dressup; Homemade TV; Pencil Box
Best Television Public Affairs Broadcaster	Best Radio Public Affairs Broadcaster
Jack McGaw and Ruth Fremes, The Failing Strategy; Linden MacIntyre, The MacIntyre Report; Eric Malling, The Fifth Estate	Pierre Berton and Charles Templeton, Dialogue; Don Harron, Morningside; Warner Troyer, Sunday Morning
Best TV Variety Performance	Best Radio Variety Performance
John Candy, Joe Flaherty, Eugene Levy, Andrea Martin, Catherine O'Hara, Harold Ramis and Dave Thomas, Second City Television; Julie Amato, The Julie Show; Karen Kain, Karen Kain Ballerina	Nancy White, Sunday Morning; Roger Abbott, Dave Broadfoot, Don Ferguson, Luba Goy and John Morgan, Royal Canadian Air Farce; Gene Di Novi, Mostly Music
Best Writing, Television Drama	Best Writing, Radio Drama
Tony Sheer, The Fighting Men; Rita Greer Allen, Raku Fire; Peter Rowe, Horse Latitudes	Rod Coneybeare, The Man Who Hated Dogs; Rod Langley, Bethune; Gordon Pinsent, John and the Missus
Best Writing, Television Public Affairs	Best Writing, Radio Public Affairs
Martyn Burke and Bill Macadam, Connections: An Investigation into Organized Crime in Canada; Harry Rasky, Homage to Chagall: The Colours of Love; George Salverson, The Disappearing Land	Jim Winter, Berthed Swiler; Susan Lumsden, René Lévesque: The Man, His Politics; Malka Marom, A Bite of the Big Apple
Gordon Sinclair Award	Foster Hewitt Award
Linden MacIntyre, The MacIntyre Report; Martyn Burke, Bill Macadam and Richard Nielson, Connections: An Investigation into Organized Crime in Canada; John Robertson and Mike Allder, 24 Hours	Don Wittman; Danny Gallivan; Jim Robson
John Drainie Award
Wayne and Shuster
