= ACTRA Award =

Canadian award for television/radio excellence

ACTRA Awards
- Location: Toronto, Ontario, Canada
- Founded: 1972; 54 years ago
- Language: English
- Website: www.actra.ca/branch-awards/

The ACTRA Awards are Canadian accolades presented since 1972 to celebrate excellence in cinema, television and radio industries. Initially it was organized and presented by the Alliance of Canadian Television and Radio Artists, which represented performers, writers and broadcast journalists, and were responsible for awarding the Nellie statuettes until 1986. That year, the television awards were taken over by the Academy of Canadian Cinema and Television to create the new Gemini Awards, although ACTRA continued to present Nellies in radio categories.

The organization relaunched the awards in 2003, this time as a more local-focused film industry award, separately presented by each of ACTRA's regional chapters to honour performances in local film and television production, since expanded to incorporate web series and video games.

== History ==
ACTRA began presenting the John Drainie Award for distinguished lifetime contribution in broadcasting in 1968, before launching a comprehensive program for television and radio awards in 1972. The 1st ACTRA Awards that year only presented the Drainie Award alongside the new Earle Grey Award for actors and Gordon Sinclair Award for broadcast journalism, with its roster of categories beginning to expand the following year.

By 1978, there began to be talk in the industry of a "Nellie curse", as several broadcast personalities in the past couple of years had been fired or had their shows cancelled very soon after winning an ACTRA award. The same year also saw the first widespread complaints about ACTRA's nomination criteria, which limited honours in most categories to ACTRA members; even if ACTRA members had collaborated with non-ACTRA members, then only the ACTRA member could be considered for nomination.

That year further saw the public revelation of an unconfirmed but longstanding industry rumour that if Lloyd Robertson had won the award for Best News Broadcaster at the 4th ACTRA Awards in 1975, elements in the audience were planning to pie him in the face just to see if they could cause the normally unflappable Robertson to lose his composure.

By 1980, the CTV network decided to boycott the awards, on the grounds that the members-only rule biased the awards in favour of CBC Television productions; the issue arose because the CBC produced most of its programming directly, and thus nearly all CBC programming involved ACTRA members, while CTV broadcast far more programming from independent non-ACTRA producers. The boycott, which continued for several years thereafter, sparked discussions through the early 1980s about how to improve the management and delivery of Canadian television awards.

In this era, there was also significant concern about the fact that ACTRA only presented awards in categories such as acting, writing and journalism, but had no categories for television crafts such as cinematography or editing, as well as a controversy when ACTRA rejected the CBC's proposal of Dan Aykroyd as host, on the grounds that he was working in the United States and not an active ACTRA member.

By 1983, the Academy of Canadian Cinema and Television's experimental Bijou Awards, which had been presented for the first time in 1981, were being proposed to replace the ACTRA Awards, but this did not proceed at this time; ultimately, responsibility for presenting the Canadian television awards was transferred to the Academy's new Gemini Awards in 1986.

Awards transferred to the Academy included the John Drainie Award, a lifetime achievement award for distinguished contributions to Canadian broadcasting, and the Earle Grey Award, which transitioned from ACTRA's award for best performance in a television film into the Academy's lifetime achievement award for acting.

Following the launch of the Geminis, the ACTRA Awards continued to honour radio programming.

== Revival ==
Beginning in 2002, ACTRA took management of the John Drainie Award back from the Academy, presenting it thereafter at the Banff Television Festival.

On the 60th anniversary of the national union in 2003, now renamed the Alliance of Canadian Cinema, Television and Radio Artists and representing only performers, the ACTRA Awards were resurrected in several of its branches across Canada as a local film and television award, presented by the organization's local chapters in Toronto, Montreal, Ottawa, British Columbia, Alberta, Saskatchewan, Manitoba, Newfoundland and Labrador and the Maritimes to honour achievements in film and television within their own regions. Depending on the level of production activity in their respective regions, some chapters of ACTRA present their awards annually, while others present their awards every two years.

However, the revived ACTRA Awards program also includes a national Award of Excellence, presented to an actor to honour their lifetime achievements; the national award of excellence is most commonly presented to an actor who is working in Hollywood, and would thus not be eligible for a regional chapter's local award of excellence. However, the national award of excellence is not necessarily always presented annually.

Some awards are handed out for performances, while others are given for union activism and contributions to the industry.

== National ACTRA ceremonies ==
Ceremony	Date	Host(s)	Best Television Program	Best Radio Program
1st ACTRA Awards	April 14, 1972	Pierre Berton	Not presented	
2nd ACTRA Awards	April 30, 1973	Pierre Berton	Not presented	
3rd ACTRA Awards	March 2, 1974	Pierre Berton	Not presented	
4th ACTRA Awards	April 23, 1975	Pierre Berton	Next Year in Jerusalem	
5th ACTRA Awards	April 21, 1976	Pierre Berton	Emily Carr	Pro Nobis Peccatoribus
6th ACTRA Awards	April 14, 1977	Pierre Berton	Beaverbrook: Life and Times of Max Aitken	The Assassination of Christopher Marlowe
7th ACTRA Awards	March 22, 1978	Gordon Pinsent	Aberfan	A Bite of the Big Apple
8th ACTRA Awards	April 4, 1979	Gordon Pinsent, Don Harron	A Gift to Last	The Other Self
9th ACTRA Awards	April 9, 1980	Dave Broadfoot	Drying Up the Streets	Aftermath of Jonestown
10th ACTRA Awards	April 3, 1981	Gordon Pinsent	The Canadian Establishment	Sunday Morning
11th ACTRA Awards	May 12, 1982	Jim Carrey, Dixie Seatle	Just Another Missing Kid	This Year In Jerusalem
12th ACTRA Awards	April 16, 1983	Don Harron	Billy Bishop Goes to War	Fruit of the Poisoned Tree
13th ACTRA Awards	April 3, 1984	Laurier LaPierre, Ann Mortifee, Jayne Eastwood	The Undaunted	The Panther and the Jaguar
14th ACTRA Awards	April 3, 1985	Roger Abbott, Joyce Davidson	Chautauqua Girl	George Orwell: A Radio Biography
15th ACTRA Awards	April 2, 1986	Don Harron, Pierre Berton, Barbara Frum, Gordon Pinsent, Dave Broadfoot, Ann Mortifee	Charlie Grant's War	Glenn Gould: The Well-Tempered Polymath

== National Award of Excellence recipients ==
- 2003 — Leslie Nielsen
- 2004 — Lloyd Bochner
- 2005 — Tonya Williams
- 2007 — Kiefer Sutherland
- 2009 — Sandra Oh
- 2010 — Eugene Levy
- 2011 — Bruce Greenwood
- 2015 — Jason Priestley
- 2016 — Neve Campbell
- 2017 — Kim Coates
- 2018 — Molly Parker
- 2019 — Jay Baruchel
- 2020 — Catherine O'Hara

== Regional awards ceremonies ==
=== UBCP/ACTRA Awards (Vancouver) ===
==== 2012–2022 ====
Year	Best Lead Actor	Best Lead Actress	Best Supporting Actor	Best Supporting Actress	Best Emerging Performer	Best Voice	Best Stunt	Ref.
2012	Stephen Lobo (Sisters & Brothers)	Camille Sullivan (Afghan Luke)	—N/a		Kacey Rohl (Sisters & Brothers)	Andrea Libman (My Little Pony: Friendship Is Magic)	Phil Mitchell (True Justice)	
2013	John Pyper-Ferguson (Motive)	Gabrielle Rose (Crimes of Mike Recket)	—N/a		Tyler Johnston (Motive)	Nicole Oliver (The Littlest Pet Shop)	Colby Chartrand (True Justice)	
2014	Ian Tracey (Continuum)	Sara Canning (Remedy)	—N/a		Taylor Hill (Leap 4 Your Life)	Andrea Libman (My Little Pony: Friendship Is Magic)	Leif Havdale (Arrow)	
2015	Michael Eklund (Eadweard)	Camille Sullivan (Ally Was Screaming)	—N/a		Dakota Daulby (Black Fly)	Brian Drummond (Nerds and Monsters)	Leif Havdale (Arrow)	
2016	Aleks Paunovic (Numb)	Camille Sullivan (The Birdwatcher)	—N/a		Jacob Tremblay (Room)	Lee Tockar (Slugterra)	Adrien Hein (Arrow)	
2017	Adrian Holmes (19-2)	Tammy Gillis (Menorca)	—N/a		Adam DiMarco (Marrying the Family)	Rebecca Husain (Beat Bugs)	Simon Burnett, Leif Havdale, Corry Glass, and Jon Kralt (Supergirl)	
2018	Bob Frazer (The Cannon)	Karin Konoval (The X-Files)	—N/a		Daniel Doheny (Adventures in Public School)	Sabrina Pitre (Chuck's Choice)	Brett Chan, Gerald Paetz, Andrew Chin, and Mark Chin (Darc)	
2019	Ben Cotton (Crown and Anchor)	Camille Sullivan (Kingsway)	—N/a		Steven Roberts (In God I Trust)	Erin Mathews (Super Monsters Furever Friends)	Eli Zagoudakis, Nathaniel Shuker, and Marshall Bingham (Arrow)	
2020	John Cassini (Daughter)	Carmen Moore (Rustic Oracle)	Brendan Fletcher (Night Hunter)	Jenn MacLean-Angus (Daughter)	—N/a	Giles Panton (Absolute Carnage)	Corry Glass and Adrian Hein (The Detour – The Sister)	
2021	Christopher Shyer (Debris)	Camille Sullivan (Hunter Hunter)	Hiro Kanagawa (Deeper I Go)	Eden Summer Gilmore (The Good Doctor)	—N/a	Brent Miller (Ninjago)	Brett Chan, Andrew Chin, Yusuf A. Ahmed, Aliya Iskakova, Jennifer Li, and Derick Vizcarra (Kung Fu)	
2022	Stephen Lobo (Donkeyhead)	Agam Darshi (Donkeyhead)	Eric McCormack (Drinkwater)	Leah Gibson (Joe Pickett)	—N/a	Ian Hanlin (Angry Birds: Summer Madness)	Marny Eng, Colby Chartrand, Kevin Fortin, Leif Havdale, and Jeff Sanca (Sonic the Hedgehog 2)	

==== 2023–2025 ====
After the 2022 awards, the categories of Best Lead Actor, Best Lead Actress, Best Supporting Actor and Best Supporting Actress were eliminated, and the Best Performance, Made for Television Movie and Best Short Performance categories were added.

Year	Best Lead Performance			Best Supporting Performance			Best Short Performance	Best Voice	Best Stunt	Ref.
Year	Motion Picture	Series	Made for Television Movie	Motion Picture	Series	Made for Television Movie	Best Short Performance	Best Voice	Best Stunt	Ref.
2023	Cardi Wong (Golden Delicious)	Sarah Chalke (Firefly Lane – '"Heart Shaped Box")	Greyston Holt (House of Chains)	June B. Wilde (Blood)	Gabrielle Rose (The Night Agent – Eyes Only)	—N/a	Jess McLeod (A Little Vacation)	Ian Hanlin (The Guava Juice Show – "DoomsRoi Device")	Mike Mitchell; Matt Mylrea, Gerald Paetz, Chris Webb (The Night Agent – "The Call")	
2024	Michelle Harrison (re: Uniting)	Jewel Staite (Family Law – "The Chickens Come Home to Roost")	Faith Wright (Buying Back My Daughter)	Priscilla Faia (Calamity Jane)	Kandyse McClure (Virgin River – Calculated Risk)	—N/a	Garfield Wilson (DTF?)	Brian Drummond (Sonic Prime – "No Escape")	Lauro Chartrand-Del Valle and Sharlene Royer; Janene Carleton, Jordan Davis, Simon Pidgeon, Matthew Phillips, Quentin Scheider (Tracker – "Klamath Falls")	
2025	Emily Lê (Paying for It)	Marci T. House (Tracker - Exodus)	Bethany Brown (We Three Kings)	Bradley Stryker (13th Round)	Patrick Gilmore (School Spirits - Fire, Talk to Me)	Trevor Lerner (The Santa Class)	Kevin McNulty (Attendance)	Brian Drummond (Super Team Canada – And So It Begins.../Do You Mind if We Continue?	Marny Eng, Colin Decker, Jonathan Vellner (The Last of Us – "Through the Valley")	

=== ACTRA Awards in Montreal ===
Year	Award of Excellence	Outstanding Performance		Outstanding Voice Performance		Outstanding Stunt Performance	Outstanding Videogame Performance		Ref.
Year	Award of Excellence	Male	Female	Male	Female	Outstanding Stunt Performance	Male	Female	Ref.
2005	Vlasta Vrána	Bruce Ramsay (Baby for Sale)	Claudia Ferri (Ciao Bella)	Terrence Scammell (Tripping the Rift)		—N/a	—N/a		
2007	Walter Massey	Alain Goulem (The Tournament)	Laurence Leboeuf (Human Trafficking)	Michel Perron (Monster Allergy)		Stéphane Lefebvre (Last Exit)	—N/a		
2008	Ranee Lee	Andrew Walker (Steel Toes)	Ellen David (Surviving My Mother)	Rick Jones (Fred's Head)		—N/a	—N/a		
2010	Jay Baruchel	Conrad Pla (Burning Mussolini)	Kaniehtiio Horn (The Trotsky)	Pauline Little (The True Story of Puss n' Boots)		Jean-Francois Lachapelle (Punisher: War Zone)	—N/a		
2011	Dick Irvin Jr.	Joe Cobden (Peepers)	Emily VanCamp (Ben Hur)	Tony Robinow, The Girl with the Dragon Tattoo		—N/a	—N/a		
2013	David Rigby	Christopher Heyerdahl (Hell on Wheels)	Christina Broccolini (Face Divided)	Lucinda Davis (Supernatural: The Animation)		Patrick Kerton (Everywhere)	Julian Casey (Far Cry 3)		
2015	Ellen David	Mark Camacho (X-Men: Days of Future Past)	Meaghan Rath (Being Human)	Liz MacRae, Bounty Hunters		Héléna Laliberté and Naomi Frenette (Pompeii)	Dan Jeannotte (Assassin's Creed: Unity)		
2017	—N/a	Jesse Camacho (We're Still Together)	Charlotte Rogers (LARPs)	Jennifer Seguin, 2 Nuts and a Richard		Mich Todorovic (X-Men: Apocalypse)	Victoria Sanchez (Deus Ex: Mankind Divided)		
2019	—N/a	Neil Napier (The Disappearance)	Katy Breier (FANatic)	Brian Froud, Zafari	Lucinda Davis (Racetime)	Michael Scherer (XXX: Return of Xander Cage)	Julian Casey (We Happy Few)	Catherine Kidd (For Honor)	
2020	No awards								
2021	Caroline Dhavernas	No awards in most categories							
2022	—N/a	Ayham Abou Ammar (Peace by Chocolate)	Sarah Booth (Last Call)	Vlasta Vrana (Felix and the Treasure of Morgäa)	Eleanor Noble (Pil's Adventures)	—N/a	Alex Weiner (Marvel's Guardians of the Galaxy)	Emmanuelle Lussier-Martinez (Marvel's Guardians of the Galaxy)	

=== ACTRA Awards in Toronto ===
Year	Award of Excellence	Outstanding Performance			Outstanding Voice Performance			Members' Choice Series Ensemble	Ref.
Year	Award of Excellence	Male (Note: "Outstanding Performance – Gender-Non Conforming or Male" from 2022 to 2024)	Female (Note: "Outstanding Performance – Gender-Non Conforming or Female" from 2022 to 2024)	Non-Binary / Gender Non-Conforming	Male or Gender Non-Conforming	Female or Gender Non-Conforming	Youth	Members' Choice Series Ensemble	Ref.
2003	Gordon Pinsent	Shawn Doyle (The Eleventh Hour)	Kristen Thomson (I Shout Love)	—N/a	—N/a		—N/a	—N/a	
2004	Sonja Smits	Brent Carver (Elizabeth Rex)	Diane D'Aquila (Elizabeth Rex)	—N/a	—N/a		—N/a	—N/a	
2005	Paul Gross	Richard Chevolleau (The Eleventh Hour)	Kristen Thomson (I, Claudia)	—N/a	—N/a		—N/a	—N/a	
2006	Sarah Polley	Tom McCamus (Waking Up Wally: The Walter Gretzky Story)	Samantha Weinstein (Big Girl)	—N/a	—N/a		—N/a	—N/a	
2007	Wendy Crewson	Gordon Pinsent (Away from Her)	Maria del Mar (Terminal City)	—N/a	Len Carlson (Atomic Betty)		—N/a	—N/a	
2008	Eric Peterson	Aaron Poole (This Beautiful City)	Caroline Cave (This Beautiful City)	—N/a	Matt Watts (Canadia: 2056)		—N/a	—N/a	
2009	Peter Keleghan	Nicholas Campbell (The Englishman's Boy)	Rosemary Dunsmore (The Baby Formula)	—N/a	Jamie Watson (Peep and the Big Wide World)		—N/a	—N/a	
2010	Colin Mochrie	K. C. Collins (Guns)	Kathleen Munroe (Flashpoint)	—N/a	Julie Lemieux (Spliced)		—N/a	—N/a	
2011	Fiona Reid	Maury Chaykin (Less Than Kind)	Molly Parker and Tracy Wright (Trigger)	—N/a	Seán Cullen (Jimmy Two-Shoes)		—N/a	—N/a	
2012	Rick Mercer	Christopher Plummer (Barrymore)	Amy Price-Francis (King)	—N/a	Billy MacLellan (Afghanada)		—N/a	—N/a	
2013	Shirley Douglas	Shawn Doyle (The Disappeared)	Tatiana Maslany (Picture Day)	—N/a	Shannon Kook-Chun (Requiem for Romance)		—N/a	—N/a	
2014	R. H. Thomson	Rick Roberts (Jack)	Amanda Brugel (Sex After Kids)	—N/a	Terry McGurrin (Scaredy Squirrel)		—N/a	—N/a	
2015	Tantoo Cardinal	Gavin Crawford (Two 4 One)	Tatiana Maslany (Orphan Black)	—N/a	Cory Doran (Total Drama)		—N/a	—N/a	
2016	Sarah Gadon	Christopher Plummer (Remember)	Catherine O'Hara (Schitt's Creek)	—N/a	Julie Lemieux (Numb Chucks)		—N/a	—N/a	
2017	Yannick Bisson	Joey Klein (We're Still Together)	Jean Yoon (Kim's Convenience)	—N/a	Linda Kash (Fugget About It)		—N/a	Kim's Convenience	
2018	Jennifer Podemski	Stuart Hughes (The Drawer Boy)	Sheila McCarthy (Cardinals)	—N/a	Saara Chaudry (The Breadwinner)		—N/a	Baroness von Sketch Show	
2019	Jayne Eastwood	Stephen McHattie (Crown and Anchor)	Amybeth McNulty (Anne with an E)	—N/a	Mark Little (Cupcake & Dino: General Services)	Bryn McAuley (Top Wing)	—N/a	Schitt's Creek	
2020	Jean Yoon	Dalmar Abuzeid (Anne with an E)	Cara Ricketts (Anne with an E)	—N/a	Carter Hayden (Hotel Transylvania: The Series)	Bryn McAuley (Hotel Transylvania: The Series)	—N/a	Schitt's Creek	
2021	Jani Lauzon	Jesse LaVercombe (Violation)	Tamara Podemski (Coroner)	—N/a	Cory Doran (Doomsday Brothers)	Bahia Watson (Total Dramarama)	—N/a	Schitt's Creek	
2022	Art Hindle	Dayo Ade (Cinema of Sleep)	Kelly McCormack (Sugar Daddy)	—N/a	Joshua Graham (Go, Dog. Go!)	Angela Asher (Silver Cord Trailer)	—N/a	Sort Of	
2023	Angelica Lisk-Hann	Eric Peterson (Junior's Giant)	Raven Dauda (Five Days at Memorial)	—N/a	Billy MacLellan (Each Man's Son)	Bahia Watson (My Little Pony: Make Your Mark)	—N/a	Sort Of	
2024	Maria del Mar	Salvatore Antonio (Slasher)	Elizabeth Saunders (SmokeBreak)	—N/a	Cory Doran (Super Wish)	Maria Nash (Pinecone & Pony)	—N/a	Sort Of	
2025	Debra McGrath	Rick Roberts (The Light Before the Sun)	Stefani Kimber (The Players)	Rabiya Mansoor (Bad Accountant)	Deven Mack (Sonic Prime)	Genevieve Adam (Deceitful Above All Things)	Deven Mack (Sonic Prime)	Law & Order Toronto: Criminal Intent	
2026	Paul Sun-Hyung Lee	Adrian Walters (It Comes in Waves)	Nina Kiri (Out Standing)	Ci Hang Ma (School Spirits)	Pierre Simpson (Night of the Zoopocalypse)	Gabbi Kosmidis (Night of the Zoopocalypse)	Athan Giazitzidis (Mittens & Pants)	Heated Rivalry	

== See also ==
- Canadian television awards
