= 2nd ACTRA Awards =

Canadian television awards ceremony

- Date: April 30, 1973
- Hosted by: Pierre Berton

The 2nd ACTRA Awards were presented on April 30, 1973 to honour achievements in Canadian television in 1972. The ceremony was hosted by Pierre Berton, and featured several new categories which had not been presented at the 1st ACTRA Awards the previous year.

== Winners and nominees ==
Earle Grey Award	Gordon Sinclair Award
Gordon Pinsent, The Rowdyman; Jon Granik, Islam; Dawn Greenhalgh, Paul Bernard, Psychiatrist; Michael Kane, The Disposable Man; Henry Ramer, Here Come the Seventies; Deborah Turnbull, Peace of Utrecht	Max Ferguson; Barbara Frum; Michael Magee
Best Variety Performer	Best Public Affairs Broadcaster
Anne Murray; Julie Amato and Jack Duffy, Half the George Kirby Comedy Hour; Laurie Bower, The Laurie Bower Singers; Barbara Hamilton, Inside from the Outside; Wayne and Shuster	Peter Gzowski, This Country in the Morning; Pierre Berton; Barbara Frum, As It Happens; Jack McGaw; Carole Taylor; Warner Troyer
Best Dramatic Writer	Best Documentary Writer
Len Peterson, Trouble with Giants; Ron Kelly, Springhill; Grahame Woods, Strike	Neil Copeland, Titanic: Six Decades of Controversy and The Oak Island Mystery: Fact or Fiction?; John David Hamilton, York-Scarboro Revisited 1972; William Whitehead, The Nature of Things
John Drainie Award
Rupert Caplan
