= 10th ACTRA Awards =

Canadian television awards ceremony

- Date: April 3, 1981
- Hosted by: Gordon Pinsent

Highlights
- Best TV Program: The Canadian Establishment
- Best Radio Program: Sunday Morning

Television/radio coverage
- Network: CBC Television

The 10th ACTRA Awards were presented on April 3, 1981, and hosted by Gordon Pinsent.

== Television ==
Best Television Program	Best Television Actor
The Canadian Establishment: "Store Wars" and "Ten Toronto Street"; A Gift to Last; The Hanga Shore	Al Waxman, The Winnings of Frankie Walls; Lawrence Dane, A Question of the Sixth; Dixie Seatle, A Population of One
Best Continuing TV Performance	Best Supporting TV Performance
Don Francks, The Phoenix Team; Elizabeth Shepherd, The Phoenix Team; Kim Yaroshevskaya, Home Fires	Mary Pirie, Lyon's Den; Helen Burns, Today I Am a Fountain Pen; Sonja Smits, War Brides
Best New Performer	Best TV Variety Performance
Lally Cadeau, Harvest; Wendy Crewson, War Brides; Allan Levson, Today I Am a Fountain Pen	Dinah Christie, D.C. and Friends; Jeff Hyslop, Dancin' Man; Johnny Wayne and Frank Shuster, Wayne and Shuster Superspecial
Best Television Host or Interviewer	Best Writing, Television Drama
Patrick Watson, The Canadian Establishment: "Store Wars"; Eric Malling, The Fifth Estate; Sherv Shragge, Shragge's Journal	Grahame Woods, War Brides; Rob Forsyth, Harvest; Tony Sheer, Maintain the Right
Best Writing, Television Comedy/Variety	Best Writing, Television Public Affairs
Roger Abbott, Dave Broadfoot, Don Ferguson, Gord Holtam, John Morgan and Rick Olsen, Royal Canadian Air Farce; Ted Barris and Alex Barris, A Little Part of Canada; Charles Weir, Guy Shulman, Mark Shekter and Robert Sandler, Dancin' Man	Ted Remerowski, The Canadian Establishment: "Store Wars"; Les Nirenberg, Man Alive: "City of Love"; Peter Pearson, The Canadian Establishment: "The Chairman"

== Radio ==
Best Radio Program	Best Radio Host
Sunday Morning; Africa Week; Morningside: "War Measures"; A Salzburg Diary	Bronwyn Drainie and Patrick Martin, Sunday Morning; Don Harron, Morningside; Jacqueline Toupin, Keewatin Country
Best Radio Actor	Best Radio Variety Performance
Zoe Caldwell, Fifth Business; Douglas Campbell, The Life of Galileo; Martha Henry, Memoir	Linden Soles, 60 Minutes with a Bullet: The Decade; Bill Buck, Norm Grohmann, Marla Gropper and Bill Reiter, Dr. Bundolo's Pandemonium Medicine Show; Gene Di Novi, Morningside: "Cole Porter"
Best Writing, Radio Drama	Best Writing, Radio Variety
Sharon Pollock, Sweet Land of Liberty; John Murrell, Memoir; Jim Nichol, Biko	Linden Soles, 60 Minutes with a Bullet: The Decade; Erika Ritter, Morningside: "Invasion of the Stewardesses"; Dan Thatchuk, Dr. Bundolo's Pandemonium Medicine Show
Best Writing, Radio Public Affairs
Harry Rasky, Africa Week; Naomi Diamond, Open Circuit: The Handicapped Child; Lilian Garson, Growing Up in the Coke Ovens

== Journalism and special awards ==
Gordon Sinclair Award	Foster Hewitt Award
Eric Malling; Harry J. Boyle; Charles Templeton	Jim Robson; Dave Hodge; Bernie Pascall
John Drainie Award
Frances Hyland
