= 1st ACTRA Awards =

Canadian television awards ceremony

- Date: April 14, 1972
- Hosted by: Pierre Berton

The 1st ACTRA Awards were presented on April 14, 1972 to honour achievements in Canadian television in 1971. As the first time that dedicated Canadian television awards had been presented by the Alliance of Canadian Cinema, Television and Radio Artists separately from the inclusion of television films in the Canadian Film Awards program, they were a modest affair, with presentations in just two competitive categories, one for acting and one for journalism, and a lifetime achievement award for contributions to Canadian broadcasting.

The program was expanded to seven categories for the 2nd ACTRA Awards in 1973.

The ceremony was hosted by Pierre Berton, who was himself the winner of the journalism award.

== Winners and nominees ==
Earle Grey Award	Gordon Sinclair Award
Genevieve Bujold; Chief Dan George; Paul Harding; Budd Knapp; Gordon Pinsent	Pierre Berton; Peter Gzowski; Gerald Pratley; Orest Ulan; Jack Webster
John Drainie Award
Graham Spry
