= Foster Hewitt Award =

The Foster Hewitt Award may refer to the following awards for excellence in sports broadcasting, named after Canadian radio broadcaster Foster Hewitt:

- The Foster Hewitt Memorial Award, presented by the Hockey Hall of Fame to honour outstanding work by ice hockey broadcasters.
- The ACTRA Foster Hewitt Award, which was presented from 1972 to 1986 by the ACTRA (Alliance of Canadian Cinema, Television and Radio Artists) to honour outstanding work by Canadian television and radio sportscasters.
