= Dinah Christie =

Canadian actress, singer (1942–2026)

- Born: Dinah Barbara Christie; December 29, 1942; London, England
- Died: April 10, 2026 (aged 83); Toronto, Ontario, Canada
- Occupations: Actress; singer
- Years active: 1960–2006
- Spouse: Bob Warren
- Father: Robert Christie
- Awards: ACTRA Award – Best variety performance 1981 D.C. and Friends; ACTRA Award – Best radio variety performers 1984 The Entertainers – Dinah Christie & Tom Kneebone; Gemini Award – Best actress in a continuing series 1987 Check it Out!

Dinah Barbara Christie (December 29, 1942 – April 10, 2026) was a Canadian actress and singer, best known for her regular appearances in Canadian television variety entertainment shows.

== Early life and career ==
Christie was born in London, England to actors Robert and Margot Christie, she came to Canada at the age of two with her parents and grew up in Toronto. She had a younger sister and, later, three half-siblings. At age 13, she worked as a call boy at the Stratford Festival and became an apprentice at the Festival in 1960.

In 1961, she sang in a comedy revue in Toronto, directed by her father. Before she was out of her teens, she had been cast in small roles at Stratford. In 1962, aged 19, she starting singing while attending North Toronto Collegiate Institute (NTCI) and performed as a folk singer in her teens, taking voice lessons from Portia White. Christie reached Grade 13 at NTCI but did not graduate.

In 1965, she was selected by Tom Kneebone to co-star in a stage revue, and the two would frequently work together for decades. The same year, she joined CBC Television's This Hour Has Seven Days, for which she regularly sang satirical songs. She also appeared in an off-Broadway musical, Your Own Thing, a rock musical of Twelfth Night.

In 1969, she performed at Stratford with her father Robert Christie in a production of Satyricon. They were the first father and daughter to perform together at Stratford.

Christie was a regular performer on the TV series Party Game (1970–1980) and Check it Out! (1985–1988). In 1981, she won an ACTRA Award for best variety performance for her performance on the D.C. and Friends TV special. She and Kneebone won the 1984 ACTRA for best radio variety performers, and Christie won the 1987 Gemini Award for best actress in a continuing series for Check it Out!

== Personal life and death ==
In 1971, she bought a farm near Mount Forest, Ontario, Canada, and lived there with her husband, photographer Bob Warren. In the late 1980s, she and her younger sister, Cedar Christie (1946–2021), founded a design and manufacturing company called "The Badd Sisters", which sold products made from hemp and recycled cotton.

Christie died on April 10, 2026, at the age of 83. During her last years she suffered from dementia and was receiving care at Toronto's Kensington Gardens nursing home.
