= The Play's the Thing =

The Play's the Thing may refer to:

- "The play's the thing", a quotation from Shakespeare's play Hamlet Act 2, Scene 2
- Actors Studio (TV series), a 1948–50 American television series later retitled The Play's the Thing
- The Play's the Thing (TV series), a 1974 Canadian television series
- The Play's the Thing (play), an adaptation by P. G. Wodehouse of The Play at the Castle by Ferenc Molnár
- "The Play's the Thing" (Arthur), a 2010 television episode
- "The Play's the Thing" (Boy Meets World), a 1994 television episode
- "The Play's the Thing" (Full House), a 1992 television episode
- "The Play's the Thing" (Quantum Leap), a 1992 television episode
- "The Play's the Thing" (SpongeBob SquarePants), a 2010 television episode
- "The Play's the Thing" (The Suite Life on Deck), a 2011 television episode
- "The Play's the Thing" (Upstart Crow), a 2016 television episode
- The Play's the Thing (radio series), a radio program broadcast on National Public Radio
