= Dawn Greenhalgh =

Canadian actress (1933–2026)

- Born: September 25, 1933; Shanghai, Republic of China
- Died: November 6, 2026 (aged 93); Toronto, Ontario, Canada
- Occupation: Actress

Hazel Dawn Greenhalgh (September 25, 1933 – November 6, 2026) was a Canadian actress. She was best known for her regular roles as Allison Carr in the television series Strange Paradise, and as the voice of Queen Celeste in the animated television series Babar.

== Life and career ==
Born in Shanghai, China, to British parents, her father was a civil engineer working for the city water works. She spent some time living in a concentration camp during the Japanese occupation of the city. Shortly after the People's Liberation Army took control of China in 1949, she emigrated to Montreal, completing her high school education at Montreal High School and becoming the founder and first editor of the school newspaper.

Greenhalgh was married to actor Ted Follows from 1958 to 1979, with the two establishing their reputations as stage actors in the late 1950s and 1960s. Their children include actresses Megan Follows and Samantha Follows, theatre director Laurence Follows, and playwright and screenwriter Edwina Follows. The entire family have worked together on various projects, including a three-episode story arc on The Littlest Hobo in 1982, and a 2001 production of Noël Coward's Hay Fever in Gravenhurst, which later toured to several Southern Ontario cities in 2003.

Through her career, she had roles in film, television, theatre and voice work in animation.

Greenhalgh died at her home in Toronto, Canada, on November 6, 2026, at the age of 93.

== Awards ==
Award	Date of ceremony	Category	Work	Result	Ref(s)
ACTRA Awards	1973	Earle Grey Award	Paul Bernard, Psychiatrist	Nominated	
Gemini Awards	2005	Best Actress in a Guest Role in a Dramatic Series	This Is Wonderland	Nominated	
