= Bill Good Sr. =

Canadian radio sports broadcaster (1918–1996)

William R. Good Sr. (1918 - 1996) was a Canadian radio sports broadcaster, most noted as the winner of ACTRA's Foster Hewitt Award for excellence in sports broadcasting at the 4th ACTRA Awards in 1975.

A native of Wilkie, Saskatchewan, Good began his career as a newspaper sports reporter in Regina and Winnipeg in the late 1930s before moving to Vancouver in 1948. He first became nationally known as a curling commentator and announcer for CBC Radio. By the time of his retirement, he had covered The Brier 48 times.

He was also a football commentator for the BC Lions of the Canadian Football League, hosting the first post-game show on CBC Vancouver in the 1950s and helping to create a football show for CKVU in the 1970s upon that station's launch in the 1970s. He was also a regular part of broadcast teams for the Canadian Open Golf Championship.

He was inducted into the Canadian Football Hall of Fame's media division in 1982, the Canadian Curling Hall of Fame as a builder in 1992, and the BC Sports Hall of Fame's media division in 2002.

His son Bill Good Jr. is also a retired Canadian television journalist, best known as a longtime radio and television news anchor on stations in the Vancouver market.
