= Robert Weaver (editor) =

Canadian editor and broadcaster

Robert Weaver (January 6, 1921 – January 26, 2008) was an influential Canadian editor and broadcaster.

Born in Niagara Falls and educated at the University of Toronto, Weaver served in the Royal Canadian Air Force during World War II. From 1948 to 1985, Robert Weaver worked at the CBC where he created a series of shows that identified and featured then unknown Canadian writers such as Alice Munro, Mordecai Richler, Timothy Findley, Margaret Atwood, and Leonard Cohen.

In 1956 Weaver founded the Tamarack Review, a Canadian literary magazine, focus of a literary revival which led to Toronto's overhauling Montreal as the literary capital of English Canada; for example, Weaver annually visited Canadian universities where he had literary friends (mostly from the University of Toronto) to encourage undergraduates to publish new poems and stories. Over the course of his career at the CBC, Weaver edited more than a dozen anthologies and initiated the annual CBC Literary Awards in 1979.

In 1975, he was the recipient of ACTRA's John Drainie Award for contributions to broadcasting at the 4th ACTRA Awards.

In order to maintain his direct contact with writers, Weaver turned down his promotions at the CBC. He accepted the appointment to the Order of Canada in 2000 after declining it multiple times, stating he was critical of the "three-tier" nature of the award.

== Works ==
- Canadian short stories. Toronto: Oxford University Press, 1952. (with Helen James)
- Canadian Short Stories. Toronto: Oxford University Press, 1960. Number 573 in The World's Classics series.
- The first five years : a selection from the Tamarack review. Toronto: Oxford University Press, 1962.
- Canadian short stories, second series. Toronto: Oxford University Press, 1968.
- The Oxford anthology of Canadian literature. Toronto : Oxford University Press, 1973. (with William Toye)
- Canadian short stories, third series. Toronto: Oxford University Press, 1978.
- Small wonders: new stories by 12 distinguished Canadian authors. Toronto: CBC, 1982.
- The Oxford book of Canadian short stories in English. Toronto: Oxford University Press, 1983. (with Margaret Atwood)
- The Anthology anthology: a selection from thirty years of CBC-Radio's "Anthology". Toronto : Macmillan of Canada, 1984.
- Canadian short stories, fourth series. Toronto: Oxford University Press, 1985.
- Canadian short stories, fifth series. Toronto: Oxford University Press, 1991.
- The New Oxford book of Canadian short stories in English. Toronto: Oxford University Press, 1995. (with Margaret Atwood)
- Emergent voices: CBC Canadian Literary Awards stories, 1979-1999. Fredericton: Goose Lane, c1999.
