= James Dubro =

American crime writer

- Born: July 12, 1946 (age 80); Boston, Massachusetts, U.S.
- Education: Columbia University; Boston University
- Writing career
- Genre: Crime
- Notable awards: Derrick Murdoch Award

James "Jim" Dubro (born July 12, 1946) is a crime writer of many books, articles and investigative television shows.

== Early life ==
Born in 1946 in Boston, Dubro earned an undergraduate degree (Phi Beta Kappa) from Boston University. He received his master's degree from Columbia University, and did graduate work at Harvard University. He moved to Toronto from his native Boston to teach English literature at Victoria College at the University of Toronto.

== Career ==
In 1973- January 9, 1974 when it aired, he researched a news-breaking hour-long documentary on espionage in Canada for CBC Television's entitled The Fifth Estate: The Espionage Establishment. The title of "the fifth estate" was used 19 months later by CBC TV for its now long-running investigative TV magazine show. He then became one of the producers of Connections, a series on organized crime broadcast on CBC Television in 1977 and 1979. It won the Anik and ACTRA awards for best documentary and the Michener Award. Dubro then became a researcher and associate producer for The Fifth Estate.

After leaving the CBC to work as a freelancer, Dubro wrote five books on organized crime in Canada and its international connections. He has also researched, written, or produced documentaries on organized crime, Cuba, the KGB and the CIA that have appeared on CBC, PBS, A&E, Citytv and CTV. He co-authored the definition of "organized crime" for all editions of The Canadian Encyclopedia.

He was president of the Crime Writers of Canada (CWC) for two years and has been awarded its 2002 "Derrick Murdoch" award for his non-fiction crime writing and his many years of CWC work. In more recent years, Dubro, a longtime activist on policing issues in the LGBT community, has written on crime and policing matters for Xtra! In 2016 he was awarded the "lifetime Achievement" award by Inspire Awards in Toronto. He has also acted as consultant and interview subject on the History Channel TV series Mob Stories. He is now a freelance crime journalist based in Toronto.

== Published works ==
- Mob Rule: Inside the Canadian Mafia (Macmillan, 1985)
- King of the Mob: Rocco Perri and the Women Who Ran His Rackets, co-authored with Robin Rowland (Penguin, 1987)
- Mob Mistress (Macmillan, 1988)
- Undercover: The Cases of the RCMP's Most Secret Operative, co-authored with Robin Rowland (Octopus, 1991)
- Dragons of Crime: Inside Asian Mobs in Canada (Octopus and M & S, 1992, 1993), national Film Board and A & E, CBC documentary
- "Introduction" to Morley Callaghan's Strange Fugitive (Toronto: Exile Editions, 2004), originally published 1928
- Preface to The Toronto You are Leaving by Gordon Anderson (Untroubled Heart Public, 2006)

== Radio play ==
Morningside, King of the Bootleggers, starring Bruno Gerussi and Barbara Budd, the story of Rocco Perri, co-authored with Robin Rowland
