= Martyn Burke =

Canadian writer and director (born 1952)

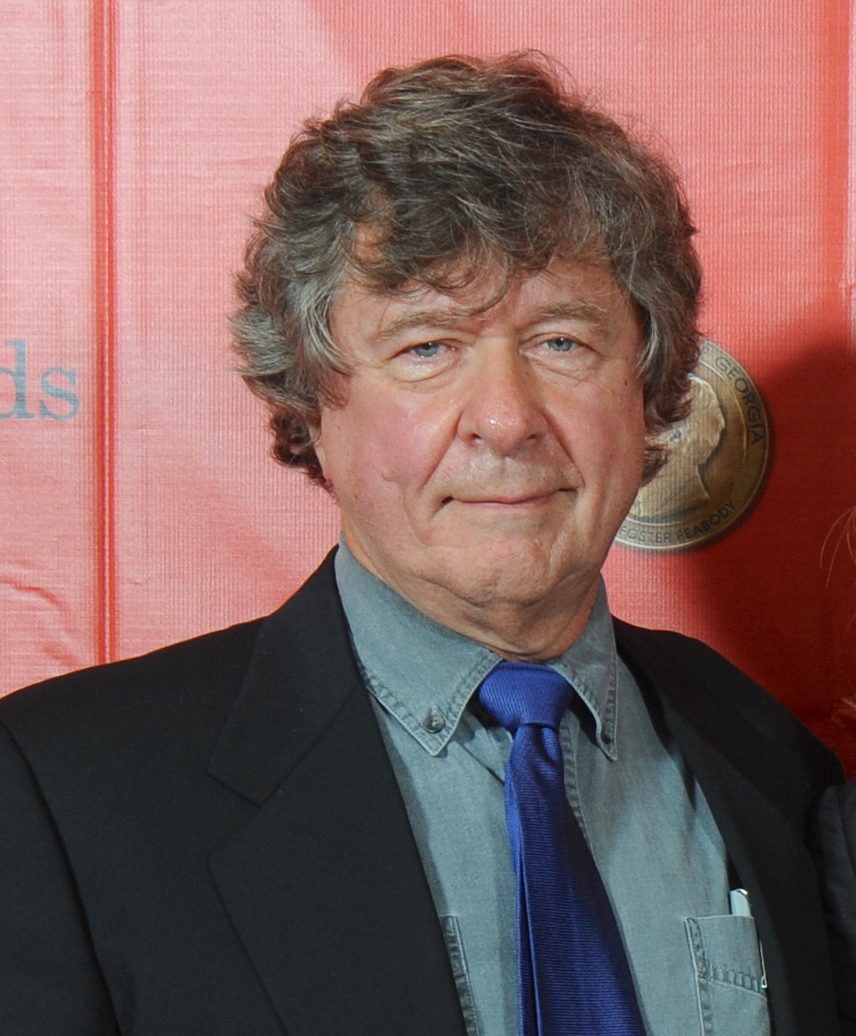
- Martyn Burke in 2013
- Born: 1952 (age 73–74); Hamilton, Ontario, Canada
- Occupations: Director, producer, screenwriter, novelist, documentary films

Martyn Burke (born 1952) is a Canadian director, novelist and screenwriter from Toronto, Ontario.

== Biography ==
Born in Hamilton, Ontario, to Freda and Les Burke who immigrated from England to Canada during World War II as part of the British Civilian Military Authority, Martyn Burke graduated from Royal York High School in Toronto, Ontario. He attended McMaster University, where he played on the football team, the McMaster Marauders, and graduated with a degree in economics. After a brief stint working in television programming for a major advertiser, Burke paid his own way over to Vietnam to work as a freelance journalist and photographer covering the war. His experience reporting on the Vietnam War was the beginning of his writing and filmmaking career and served as the background for his first novel, Laughing War which was short-listed for a Books in Canada First Novel Award.

In 2018, the BBC listed the Paramount Pictures film Top Secret!, which Burke co-wrote, as one of the top one hundred film comedies of all time.

In 2012 he won the Peabody Award and was short-listed for an Academy Award for the film Under Fire: Journalists In Combat; in 2015 he was named winner of the Auteur Award by the International Press Association in Los Angeles; and in 2018 he was awarded an honorary doctorate by McMaster University in Hamilton, Ontario.

Burke lives in Santa Monica, California with his wife, Laura Morton.

== Career ==
After Vietnam, Burke started writing, directing and producing documentaries for CBC Television winning a number of awards in Canada for his work. Among them are a Gemini Award for Best Documentary for Connections, a multi-part undercover report on the Mafia in Canada and America, and a Genie Award for his documentary, Witnesses, filmed inside the conflict zones of Afghanistan. Other conflict zone documentaries include The Week That Paddy Died, about the sectarian violence in Northern Ireland.

His experience reporting on the Vietnam War was the beginning of his writing and filmmaking career and served as the background for his first novel, Laughing War which was short-listed for a Books in Canada First Novel Award. It was to become the way that Burke wrote his novels — first researching them through on-the-ground experience as the stories formed before they were written (for The Commissar’s Report he traveled across Russia and made documentary exposés on the KGB; for Ivory Joe he made CBS segments on the exploitation of old R&B musicians; for Tiara he was based out of Brownsville Texas with DC-3 pilot-smugglers; for The Truth About The Night he spent months at the legendary Palomar Observatory not far from the Mexican border; for Music For Love Or War, he called upon his experiences in Afghanistan; His latest novel, The Gossip Columnist, set in Weimar and Nazi Germany, speaks to his lifelong interest and activities in journalism and focuses on what happens to free press and speech in times of war or suppression.

While still living in Canada, Burke began writing and directing theatrical films, such as John Candy's first film, The Clown Murders, and Power Play a.k.a. Coup d'Etat which starred Peter O'Toole and David Hemmings. He emigrated to California when Columbia Pictures optioned his book The Commissar's Report and brought him to Los Angeles to write the screenplay.

Continuing to produce and direct documentaries - his 2012 documentary Under Fire: Journalists in Combat was short-listed for an Academy Award and won a Peabody Award in 2012 - his theatrical and cable television film career expanded in Los Angeles and includes the Emmy Award nominated film for TNT, Pirates of Silicon Valley for which he was also nominated for a DGA Award as director. In 2015 he was awarded the International Press Academy's Auteur award. He wrote a number of HBO and TNT films including The Second Civil War starring Beau Bridges (for which Bridges won an Emmy) and James Earl Jones and Denis Leary, Sugartime starring John Turturro about Chicago mafia don Sam Giancana, and an adaptation of George Orwell's Animal Farm. His feature film credits include co-writing the Paramount Pictures cult classic comedy, Top Secret! and directing Avenging Angelo starring Sylvester Stallone, Anthony Quinn and Madeline Stowe.

== Films ==
- Avenging Angelo - Warner Bros. (director)
- Animal Farm - TNT (writer)
- Pirates of Silicon Valley - TNT (writer/director)
- Pentagon Wars - HBO (writer)
- The Second Civil War - HBO (writer)
- Sugartime - HBO (writer)
- Top Secret! - Paramount Pictures (co-writer)
- The Last Chase - (co-writer/director)
- Power Play a.k.a. Coup d'Etat - (writer/director)
- The Clown Murders - (writer/director)

== Documentaries ==
- Under Fire: Journalists In Combat - CBC documentary channel, theatrical and television, Distributor: Mercury Media Entertainment, London
- Islam Vs. Islamists - PBS
- The Mohawks and the Mafia - CBC
- Battle Diary: A Day in the Life of Charlie Martin - CBC
- Cinq Defis - CBC/TF-1
- Witnesses: The Untold War in Afghanistan- PBS/CBC
- The KGB Connections - CBC
- Connections: An Investigation Into Organized Crime - CBC
- Idi Amin: My People Love Me - CBC
- The Politics of Lying - CBC
- The Legend of The Sleepy Grass (Ireland) - CBC
- The Week that Paddy Died (Ireland) - CBC
- Carnivals - feature documentary
- The California Movie - CBC
- The Hollywood Ten and Others: A History of Politics in Film - CBC
- One Revolution Around the Sun (Peru) - CBC

== Novels ==
- The Gossip Columnist - Darkspur Press, 2026
- The Gossip Columnist
- Music for Love or War - Cormorant Books, Canada - Tyrus/Simon & Schuster, United States
- The Truth About the Night - HarperCollins Canada
- The Shelling of Beverly Hills - AuthorHouse
- Tiara - HarperCollins
- Ivory Joe - Bantam Books
- The Commissar's Report - Houghton Mifflin
- Laughing War - Doubleday

== Awards and nominations ==
- International Press Academy Special Achievement Auteur Award - 2015
- Peabody Award - 2012 Under Fire: Journalists in Combat
- Academy Award short-list for Best Feature Documentary Under Fire: Journalists in Combat
- DGA - Outstanding Directorial Achievement in Movies for Television nomination Pirates of Silicon Valley
- Primetime Emmy Award nomination for Outstanding Writing - TV film Pirates of Silicon Valley
- Primetime Emmy Award nomination for Outstanding TV film Pirates of Silicon Valley
- Edgar Allan Poe Award nomination for Best Television Sugartime

Feature or Miniseries

- ACTRA Award for Best Screenplay Power Play a.k.a. Coup d'Etat
- Genie Award for Best Documentary Witnesses
- Gemini Award for Best Documentary Connections
- ANIK Award for Best Film Connections
- Prix Gemeaux for Best Documentary Cinq Defis

== Sources ==
- , November 23, 2011 Globe and Mail article
- , McMaster University Alumni
- , CBC news radio interview
- , 72nd Annual George F. Peabody Awards Announcement
- , IMDb Sugartime Award Page
- International Press Academy Award Page
