= Joni Mitchell: In Her Own Words =

2014 book by Malka Marom

- Author: Malka Marom
- Language: English
- Genre: Non-fiction, memoir
- Publisher: ECW Press
- Publication date: 2014
- Publication place: Canada
- Media type: Print (hardback & paperback)
- Pages: 344 p.p.
- ISBN: 978-1-77041-132-6

Joni Mitchell: In Her Own Words is a book from conversations of musician Joni Mitchell compiled by broadcast journalist, musician, and author Malka Marom. The book is composed of conversations recorded on three separate occasions, between the years 1973 and 2012. The book was published by ECW Press in 2014.

== Acclaim and circulation ==
Released in September, 2014, Joni Mitchell In Her Own Words: Conversations with Malka Marom has garnered recognition as a 2015 IPPY Gold Medalist winner, inclusion as the Keynote topic/speaker (Marom) at "Court and Spark: An International Symposium", various mentions in on-line publications such as Brainpickings and is internationally translated and circulated in Italy and China.
