= 5th ACTRA Awards =

Canadian broadcasting award ceremony in 1976

- Date: April 21, 1976
- Hosted by: Pierre Berton

Highlights
- Best TV Program: Emily Carr
- Best Radio Program: Pro Nobis Peccatoribus

Television/radio coverage
- Network: CBC Television

The 5th ACTRA Awards were presented on April 21, 1976. The ceremony was hosted by Pierre Berton.

== Winners ==
Best Television Program	Best Radio Program
Emily Carr	Pro Nobis Peccatoribus
Best Television Actor	Best Radio Actor
Jayne Eastwood, The Last of the Four Letter Words	Chris Wiggins, The Apple Cart
Best Continuing TV Performance	Best Radio Variety Performance
Al Waxman, King of Kensington	Max Ferguson and Allan McFee, The Max Ferguson Show
Best TV Public Affairs Broadcaster	Best Radio Public Affairs Broadcaster
John Harvard, A Winnipeg Report on the Eyeglass Industry	Harry Brown, Metro Morning
Best News Broadcaster	Best Sports Broadcaster
Peter Kent	Fred Sgambati
Best Writing, Television or Film Drama	Best Writing, Radio Drama
Ted Allan, Lies My Father Told Me	Harry Bruce, Word from an Ambassador of Dreams
Best Writing, Television Documentary	Best Writing, Radio Documentary
Warner Troyer, The Fifth Estate: "Minimata"	Elizabeth Gray, The Supreme Court of Canada
Gordon Sinclair Award	John Drainie Award
Warner Troyer and Adrienne Clarkson, The Fifth Estate	Jane Mallett
