= Rupert Caplan =

Canadian producer

- Born: October 3, 1896
- Died: March 24, 1979 (aged 82)
- Citizenship: Canadian
- Occupations: Radio director, producer
- Known for: Work with the CBC
- Awards: John Drainie Award; 1973

Rupert Caplan (October 3, 1896 - March 24, 1979) was a Canadian radio director and producer, who was one of the key figures in the development and production of dramatic programming for the Canadian Broadcasting Corporation in the 20th century.

Originally from Montreal, Quebec, where he grew up a member of the city's large Jewish Canadian community, he worked with local Montreal theatre companies such as the Montreal Repertory Theatre and the Théâtre du Nouveau Monde, and joined the CBC as a producer very soon after its formation.

Following the death of American playwright Eugene O'Neill in 1953, Caplan produced an acclaimed CBC Radio tribute special that blended a biographical history of O'Neill's life with performances of excerpts from some of his plays. The special was later attributed with having sparked a critical and popular revival of interest in O'Neill, whose reputation had declined somewhat in the final years of his life; O'Neill's widow, Carlotta Monterey, was so grateful for the tribute that she granted Caplan the exclusive rights to produce the Canadian premiere of Long Day's Journey into Night, the then-unknown play which would ultimately come to be recognized as O'Neill's greatest work when it posthumously premiered in 1956.

Caplan's time with the CBC's radio drama department has been credited with the development of both a new pool of emerging Canadian playwrights in the 1950s and 1960s, and of a stable of actors who were able to remain in Canada instead of being forced to move to the United States or the United Kingdom to find work beyond the amateur level. Tyrone Guthrie would later claim that even the Stratford Festival, Canada's largest and most prestigious annual theatre festival, would not have been possible without Caplan's efforts to develop and support Canadian acting talent.

Although he worked principally in radio, he also had selected television credits, including writing and directing episodes of First Performance and Folio, as well as a small acting role in the 1950 film Forbidden Journey.

He was the recipient of ACTRA's John Drainie Award for lifetime contributions to Canadian broadcasting at the 2nd ACTRA Awards in 1973.
