= Billy MacLellan =

Canadian actor

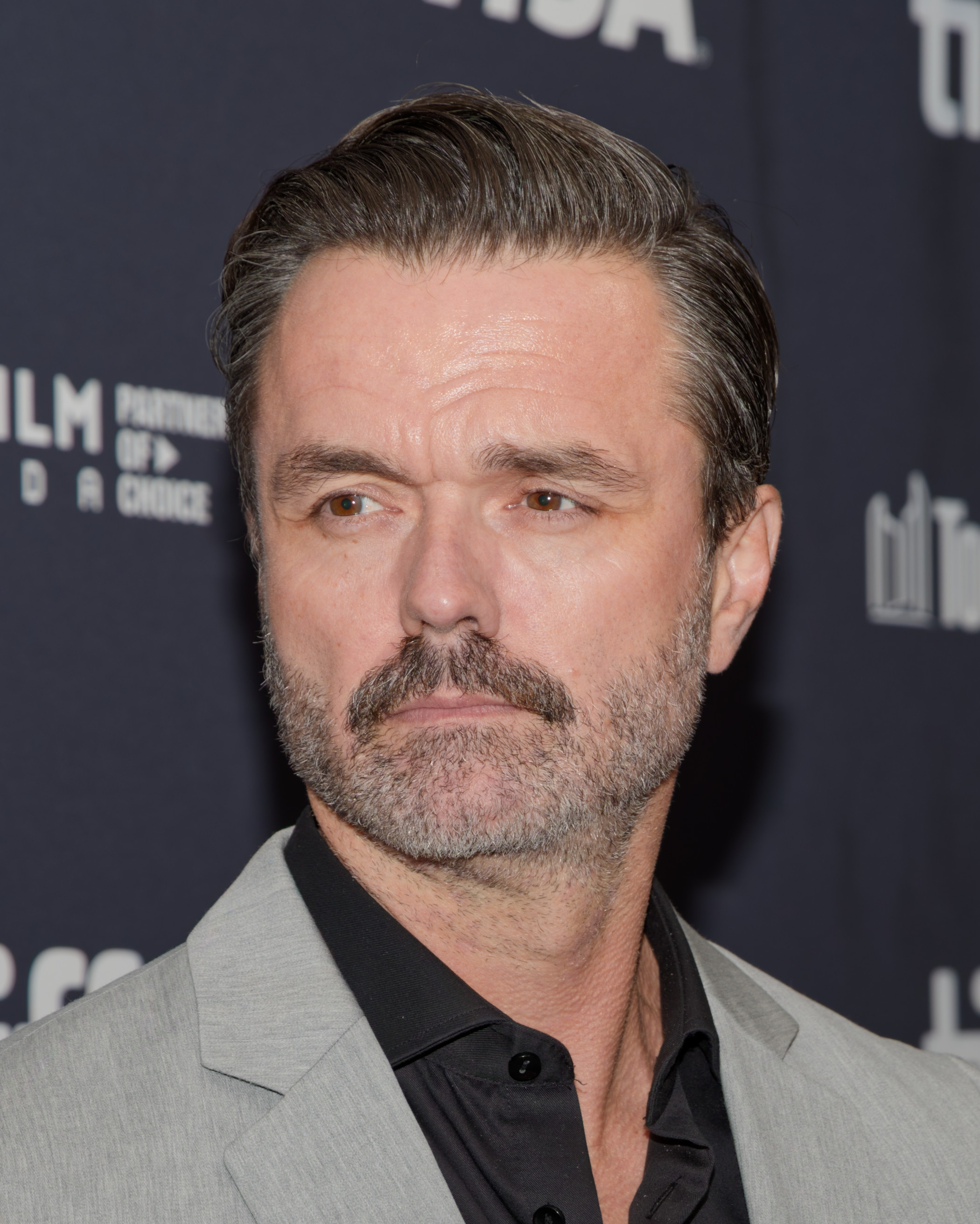
- MacLellan at the 2025 Toronto International Film Festival for Normal
- Born: January 31, 1974 (age 52)
- Citizenship: Canadian
- Occupation: Actor
- Years active: 1999–present

Billy MacLellan is a Canadian actor from Nova Scotia. He is most noted as a two-time winner of the ACTRA Award for Outstanding Male Voice Performance, winning in 2012 for his starring role in the radio drama series Afghanada and in 2023 for his narration of the audiobook version of Hugh MacLennan's novel Each Man's Son.

He is originally from Cape Breton Island. He has also been a Gemini Award nominee for Best Guest Actor in a Drama Series at the 21st Gemini Awards in 2006 for an appearance on ReGenesis, and a Robert Merritt Award nominee for Best Actor in 2010 for his performance in a Neptune Theatre production of No Great Mischief. Billy has also been a guest star on several tv drama series over the years from 2001 until 2005.

== Filmography ==
Year	Title	Role	Notes
1999	Blue Moon	Bobby	TV Movie
2002	American Psycho 2	Cadet #1	
2003	Slings & Arrows	Laertes	2 episodes
2004-2006	ReGenesis	Earl Jordan	3 episodes
2005	The Life and Hard Times of Guy Terrifico	Wayne Lipvanchuck	
2006	Warriors of Terra	Reynolds	
2009-2011	Flashpoint	Vic / Peter Wilkins	2 episodes
2010	Rookie Blue	Bruce	1 episode
2011	Republic of Doyle	Vince Bragg	1 episode
2011	Heartland	Trevor	1 episode
2012	Bomb Girls	Archie Arnott	4 episodes
2013	Unlikely Heroes	Ranger Johnny Lauw	Series regular
2013	Catch a Christmas Star	Jason	TV movie
2014	The Ron James Show	Lockie	2 episodes
2015	Defiance	Lt. Beckman	Series regular
2015	Murdoch Mysteries	Enoch / Steven Hayes /Walter Lacey	2 episodes
2015-2016	12 Monkeys	Rodell	2 episodes
2016	The Expanse	Marama Brown	1 episode
2016	Watch Dogs 2	Jummy Siska	Video game
2017	Wynonna Earp	Jaxon	1 episode
2017	Bellevue	Brady Holt	Series regular
2018	Far Cry 5	Wendell Redler	Video game
2018	Caught	Kyle O’Neill	4 episodes
2018	Star Trek: Discovery	Barlow	1 episode
2019	The Silence	The Reverend	
2019	Goalie	Fern Flaman	
2019-2022	Diggstown	Willy MacIsaac	3 episodes
2021	Nobody	Charlie Williams	
2022	Pretty Hard Cases	Will French	5 episodes
2022	In the Dark	Reggie	6 episodes
2022	Delia's Gone	Lyle	
2022	Christmas on the Rocks	Nick	TV movie
2023	Hailey Rose	Roger	
2025	Normal	Deputy Mike Nelson	
