= Malka Marom =

Canadian writer, journalist, and radio broadcaster

- Malka Marom Cohen
- Born: Malka Marom; 1942 (age 83–84)
- Occupations: Writer, Journalist, Radio broadcaster, Folksinger, Dancer
- Writing career
- Period: 1960s to present
- Notable works: Sulha, Joni Mitchell: In Her Own Words, The Bite of the Big Apple
- Website: malkamarom.com

Malka Marom is a Canadian writer, journalist, radio broadcaster, folksinger and dancer. She is best known for her music career as part of the folksinging duo Malka & Joso in the 1960s, her radio documentaries, and more recently her novel Sulha (1999) and book Joni Mitchell: In Her Own Words (2014).

== Early life ==
Born in Poland or Hungary, to Polish parents, Malka moved to Mandatory Palestine when she was six weeks old. During her teens Malka participated in the folk dancing and singing Dalia Festival, and was an actress in the first film made in Israel, A Village Tale, which is housed in Steven Spielberg's archives. She studied at the Seminar Lewinsky in Tel Aviv but left a year before graduation to marry and move to Canada.

== Career ==
After moving to Canada, she formed half of the folksinging duo Malka and Joso with fellow singer Joso Spralja. The duo is credited with bringing "ethnic" music to Canada for the first time. Their first performance was in 1963 at the Lord Simcoe Hotel. They toured Canada, the US, and England and released four LPs for Capitol Records: Introducing Malka and Joso, Mostly Love Songs, Jewish Songs and Malka and Joso – Folk Songs Around the World. They also hosted "A Wonderful World of Music" on the CBCTV in 1966. The two parted ways in 1967, each pursuing a solo career. Malka also continued dancing, she danced in Charlotte de Neve & Garbut Roberts dance company’s recital From Ancient Roots.

Malka continued to work for CBC producing radio documentaries including: The Bite of the Big Apple (following the Broadway run of the play Kronberg: 1582 and winner of the ACTRA Award in 1977). She also produced several other documentaries such as: The Bedouins, My Jerusalem, and the Holocaust. She hosted a weekly CBC Radio program called Songs of our People as well Mosaic on CityTV. She also did a series of shows profiling musicians, singers and poets; such as Joni Mitchell and Leonard Cohen.

In 1999 Malka published Sulha, a novel set in the Bedouin tents of the Sinai desert, Israel and Canada that chronicles the story of an Israeli war widow who while grieving for her husband must decide whether to allow her son to serve in the same air force.

More recently she published Joni Mitchell: In Her Own Words, a narrative based on a series of interviews conducted with the singer over four decades

== Work ==
Publications:

- Sulha (1999)
- Joni Mitchell: In Her Own Words (2014)

Documentaries:

- "A Bite of the Big Apple" (ACTRA Award)
- "Desert Diaries"
- "My Jerusalem"
- "The Holocaust"
- "The Bedouins" (Ohio State Award)
- "Joni Mitchell" (1975)
- "Joni Mitchell" (1979)
- "Pablo Casals (a one-hour interview broadcast on CBC series: Ideas)"
- "Leanord Cohen"
- "Music of Israel"
- "Music of Mexico"
- "Jilles Vinault"
- "Nana Mouskouri"
- "Irving Layton"
- "Alden Nowlan"

Music:

- "Malka & Joso: Forever"
- "Malka & Joso: Mostly Love Songs"
- "Malka & Joso: Jewish Songs"
- "Malka & Joso: Folk Songs Around the World"
