= Robin Rowland (author) =

Robin Rowland is a Canadian author, playwright, journalist and photographer, based in British Columbia.

He grew up in Kitimat, British Columbia. His family then moved to Toronto, where he attended York University and later Carleton University. He began as a reporter for the Sudbury Star and later worked for CBC News. While living in London, he worked for as a Videotex producer before returning to Canada and rejoining CBC New's teletext experiment Project Iris. He also wrote a number of radio plays for CBC Radio Drama as well as short stories and science fiction. In the mid-1980s he began collaborating with James Dubro writing about organized crime in Canada. After six years with CTV News, in 1994, as he returned to CBC News. Rowland also co-wrote the pioneering manual Researching on the Internet with Dave Kinnaman. In 1998, he became the producer of online content for CBC News: The National.

In 2003, Rowland was named as the first photo editor in the history of CBC News. At the same time, he earned a multidisciplinary master's degree from York University and Osgoode Hall Law School specializing in the history of war crimes. As a result of his research, Rowland wrote A River Kwai Story, The Sonkrai Tribunal, the story of a war crimes trial for guards in one of the most infamous camps on the during the building of the Burma Railway along the on Khwae Noi River

== Selected works ==
A River Kwai Story: The Sonkrai Tribunal

The Creative Guide to Research

Researching on the Internet (co-authored with Dave Kinnaman)

Undercover Cases of the RCMP's Most Secret Operative (co-authored with James Dubro)

King of the Mob: Rocco Perri and the Women Who Ran His Rackets (co-authored with James Dubro)

Morningside (radio program) drama series" King of the Bootleggers" starring Bruno Gerussi and Barbara Budd (co-authored with James Dubro)
