= Each Man's Son =

1951 novel by Hugh MacLennan

- First edition
- Author: Hugh MacLennan
- Language: English
- Genre: Historical
- Publisher: Macmillan of Canada
- Publication date: 1951
- Publication place: Canada
- Pages: 280
- ISBN: 978-0771034831

Each Man's Son is the fourth novel by Canadian writer Hugh MacLennan. First published in 1951 by Macmillan of Canada, it takes place in a coal mining town on Cape Breton, Nova Scotia just before the First World War.

== Plot summary ==
Mollie MacNeil and her son Alan, miss Archie (Mollie's husband) who is away in the United States trying to make a living as a professional boxer. Archie has been away for four years and it is not clear whether he will return at all. He is adamant that he will never go and work in the coal mines. Meanwhile, Louis Camire, a French expatriate, is trying to convince Mollie to come with him to France where people are more equal than those in the company-owned mining town.

The company doctor, Daniel Ainslie, takes a liking to young Alan, since his own wife Margaret is unable to bear children herself. Margaret was made barren by her own husband, who had to perform a procedure on her. Dr. Ainslie tries to exert his influence on Mollie and Alan. He believes that Alan has the intelligence to escape the mining town. Mollie and Margaret share their fears about Dr. Ainslie's influence and contrive to blunt it.

After much soul-searching, the doctor realizes that he cannot both have Alan like a son and his wife Margaret at the same time. This contradiction is violently resolved in the book's conclusion.

== Legacy ==
Actor Billy MacLellan narrated an audiobook edition of the novel in 2022, for which he won an ACTRA Award for Best Male Voice Performance in 2023.
