= Connections: An Investigation into Organized Crime in Canada =

Television documentary

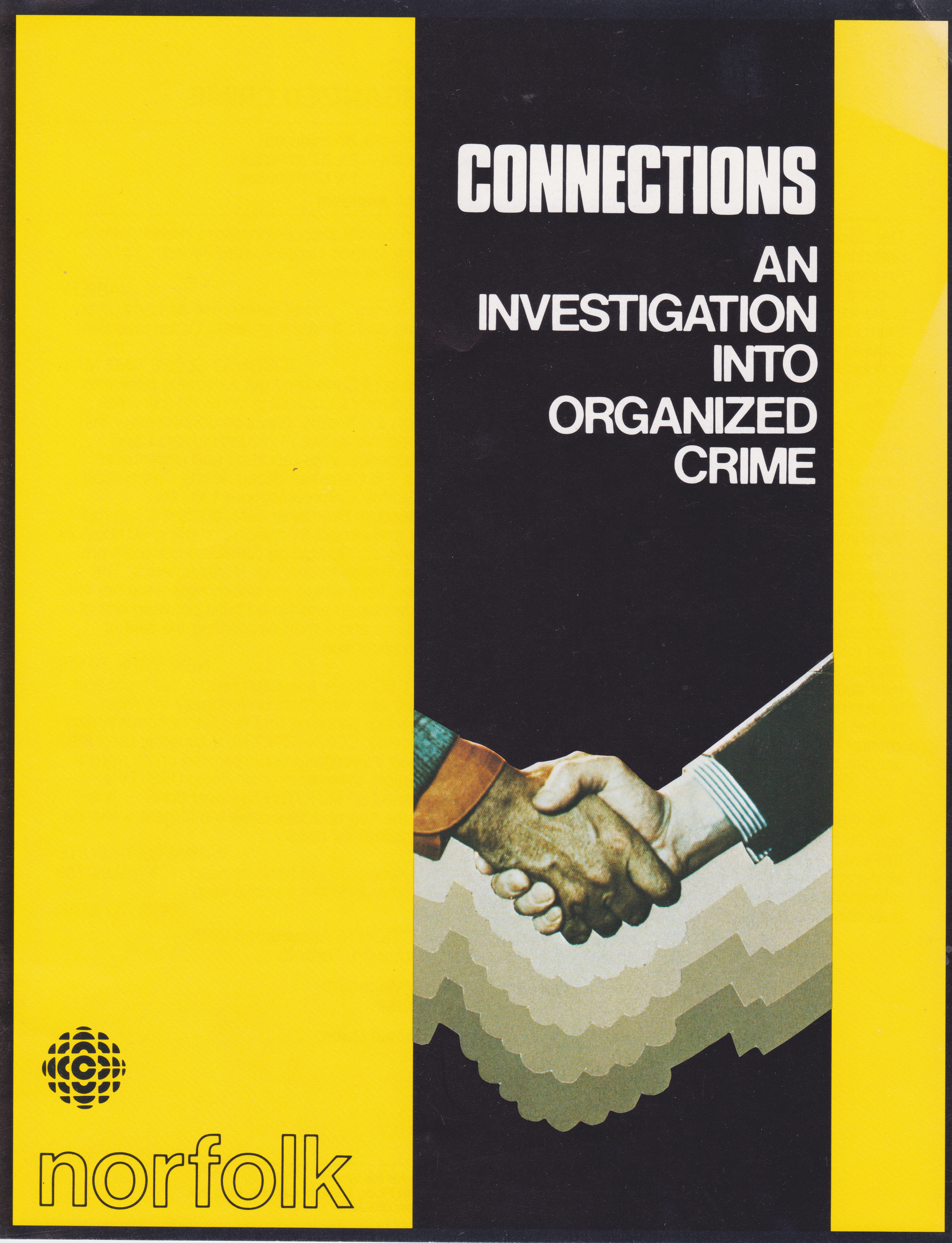
- Country of origin: Canada

Production
- Producers: William Macadam & Martyn Burke
- Production company: A CBC/Norfolk Communications Ltd. coproduction

Original release
- Release: June 12 – June 13, 1977

Connections: An Investigation into Organized Crime in Canada consisting of two television documentary programs broadcast as a CBC/Norfolk Communications Ltd coproduction transmitted by the Canadian Broadcasting Corporation in two 90-minute segments on successive nights: Sunday, June 12 and Monday, June 13, 1977.

The second series was Connections: a further Investigation into organized crime in Canada also a CBC/Norfolk Communications Ltd coproduction which was broadcast by the CBC on three successive nights beginning on Monday, March 26, 1979 as a 90-minute program followed as two 60-minute programs on Tuesday, March 27 and Wednesday, March 28.

The series was notable for its use of advanced equipment - including pioneering night film and hidden microphones - and for interviews with criminal leaders. (Note: Among other organized crime groups it exposed the activities & personalities of the Mafia, bikers, Asian gangs and corruption by some mobsters of certain politicians.) The programs were realised before the advent of the internet.

Both series covered the growth of organized crime in cities across Canada and connections to US organised crime. Both series were commissioned by Peter Herrndorf (Note: Peter Herrndorf was the then head of CBC Current Affairs television.) from Bill Macadam and his Norfolk Communications. Among organized crime groups they exposed the activities & personalities of the Mafia, bikers, Asian gangs and corruption by mobsters of certain public figures.

William Macadam and Martyn Burke were co-producers of both series. The third senior member of the production team was James Dubro (his screen credit on the first series was "Research Director" and on the second series "Associate Producer").

== Investigative process ==
=== Research ===
The exhaustive research stage (which took more than a year) was conducted by producer William Macadam and by James Dubro, working for Norfolk Communications, along with a further research team working for the company (see full numbers in list of credits below). Research was carried out throughout Canada and the United States. Initially the research team did not even know that organized crime really existed in Canada but they steadily uncovered its tentacles often reaching across the US/Canadian border. This was before the era of the internet. A complex cross file system ultimately amounting to 37,000 files was set-up back at Norfolk's nerve centre and all new names which came up daily during research were entered so that cross checks could be made. In this way they gradually were able to identify the tentacles of organized crime: and the police with their Provincial jurisdictions were often unaware of these connections.

=== Filming ===
The filming stage was carried out the following year when it had been arranged at the outset that Martyn Burke would join the production team for that stage. (A similar arrangement was followed for both series). The interviews were done by both of the coproducers William Macadam and Martyn Burke (who both then also directed for each other). The research stage had identified the names of the people involved and what they looked like. However Burke and Macadam were fully aware that they would have to find new ways of filming (the equipment then available was still large and cumbersome) if they were to get their prey on camera while minimising the danger to themselves and their camera, sound and production team in the process. Macadam, Burke and Dubro worked out the form of the filming however the filming of criminals created a new research challenge as their whereabouts at any given moment had in itself to be researched.

=== Editing ===
With a huge amount of film footage amounting to over 90 hours the editing into coherent sections became a daunting undertaking for Burke and Macadam. Richard Nielsen, a long time former Executive Producer of CBC's Weekend but by then a partner with Pat Ferns (Note: W. Paterson Ferns C.M. Later president of the Banff Television Foundation, now producing as president of Ferns Productions Inc.) in Nielsen-Ferns, an independent pioneering production company like Norfolk Communications, was shown some of the footage and felt "What I saw was the most exciting television film I had ever seen" and..."after years ... producing current affairs programming ...you're sure you've seen it all ...". He suggested the easiest way to handle the mountain of footage was to divide it into individual crime connections. This soon became an obvious solution. He was immediately asked to act as the Executive Producer to be able to advise from the distance of not having prior involvement. The arrangement meant that Macadam and Burke could take on the editing and scripting the narration of separate sections without concern for overlap. It turned out to be a brilliant suggestion out of which the name Connections logically evolved.

=== Legal ===
A team of CBC lawyers scrutinized every word of the narration and every inch of the footage. The team would not take "no" for an answer so if the narration created a legal problem Macadam, Burke and Nielsen would push the lawyers for wording that conveyed the same meaning but would not create a legal problem. James Dubro would produce from the Norfolk files the legal documentation the producers and legal team required at any point in the lengthy vetting process. The legalities of such a massive project took many months. Sometimes when a source could not be put on the stand in a court of law to protect the source's life for expected lawsuits, the team would work with the lawyers on an appropriate way around it or modify the editing and narration.

== Music and sound ==
Bruce Nyznik was brought on by Norfolk to work the sound score at an early stage. The CBC management was surprised that Macadam had put aside a few thousand dollars for a sound score. The CBC usually paid no more than a hundred or two for "Music" which was hardly needed, their accountants argued, for a documentary. Nyznik had suggested an individual sound for each character. The CBC and the rest of the team had screened rough cuts as they became ready and these had been re-edited for legal reasons where necessary. Nyznik's sound score was finally laid into one of these later screenings and the effect was electric. The score heightened the effect of the footage and was felt to be an exceptional addition and ahead of its time in documentary production.

== Reception ==
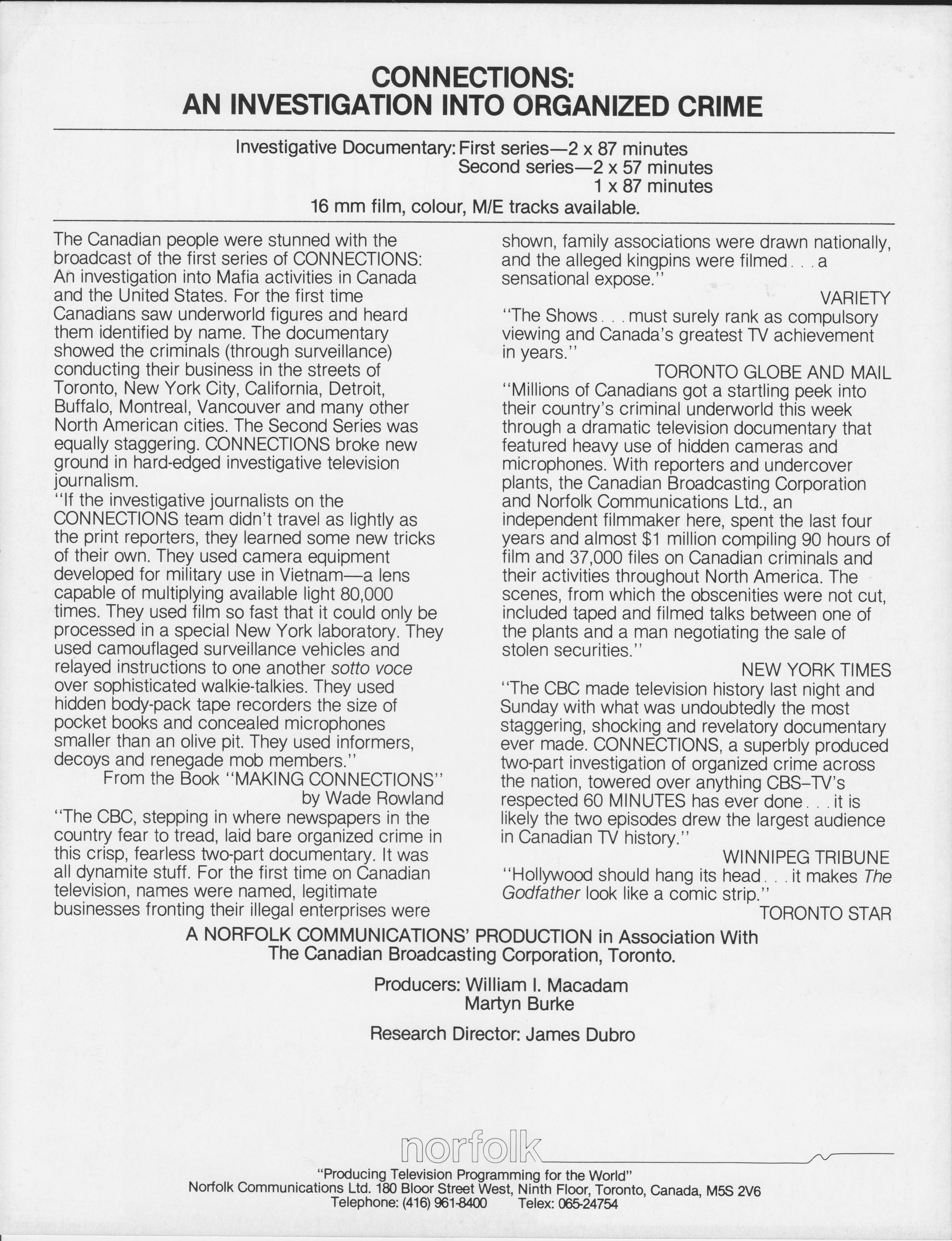
Connections organized crime tv series sales brochure back details

Millions of Canadians got a startling peek into their country's criminal underworld this week through a dramatic television documentary that featured heavy use of hidden cameras and microphones.

With reporters and undercover plants, the Canadian Broadcasting Corporation and Norfolk Communication Ltd., an independent filmmaker here, spent the last four years and almost $1 million compiling 90 hours of film and 37,000 files on Canadian criminals and their activities throughout North America.

The scenes, from which obscenities were not cut, included taped and film talks between one of the plants and a man negotiating the sale of stolen securities.

— The New York Times, April 1, 1979

== Awards ==
The programs received a Prix Anik Award (Wilderness Documetaire for best CBC documentary of the year) and the ACTRA Award (both in 1977). They also received a Canadian Film and Television Association CFTA Award and an honourable mention as a Michener Award finalist in 1977. Finalist for Second series in 1979 first Banff International Festival of Films for Television.
