= ACTRA Foster Hewitt Award =

Discontinued annual Canadian media award

The Foster Hewitt Award for Excellence in Sports Broadcasting was presented annually by ACTRA, the Canadian association of actors and broadcasters, to honour outstanding work by Canadian television and radio sportscasters. The award was named after legendary Canadian sportscaster Foster Hewitt.

Prior to the introduction of the Foster Hewitt Award, ACTRA presented an award for Best Sportscaster at the 3rd ACTRA Awards in 1974. At the 4th ACTRA Awards in 1975, the Foster Hewitt Award was introduced as a lifetime achievement award for sports broadcasting, and was presented to a different person than the Best Sportscaster award for work within the broadcast year, but this differentiation was not maintained thereafter, and the Foster Hewitt Award became the award for sportscasting work within the eligibility period rather than a lifetime award.

First presented in 1975, ACTRA discontinued the Foster Hewitt Award along with other individual awards program in 1986 when the Academy of Canadian Cinema & Television took over presenting the awards. The Academy subsequently reintroduced awards for television sportscasting, but not named for Hewitt.

== Winners ==
=== Best Sportscaster ===
- 3rd ACTRA Awards (1974) - Danny Gallivan
- 4th ACTRA Awards (1975) - Don Chevrier

=== Foster Hewitt Award ===
- 4th ACTRA Awards (1975) - Bill Good Sr.
- 5th ACTRA Awards (1976) - Fred Sgambati
- 6th ACTRA Awards (1977) - Ernie Afaganis
- 7th ACTRA Awards (1978) - Don Wittman
- 8th ACTRA Awards (1979) - Brian Williams
- 9th ACTRA Awards (1980) - Dave Hodge
- 10th ACTRA Awards (1981) - Jim Robson
- 11th ACTRA Awards (1982) - Brian Williams
- 12th ACTRA Awards (1983) - Steve Armitage
- 13th ACTRA Awards (1984) - George Young, Don Cherry
- 14th ACTRA Awards (1985) - Sue Prestedge
- 15th ACTRA Awards (1986) - Ernie Nairn
