= The Phoenix Team =

Canadian drama television series

- Genre: Spy drama
- Written by: John C. W. Saxton
- Starring: Don Francks; Elizabeth Shepherd
- Country of origin: Canada
- Original language: English
- No. of seasons: 1
- No. of episodes: 7

Production
- Executive producer: Stanley Colbert
- Producer: Lawrence S. Mirkin

Original release
- Network: CBC Television
- Release: 16 September – 28 October 1980

The Phoenix Team is a Canadian spy drama television series that aired on CBC Television in 1980.

== Plot ==
David Brook (Don Francks), a Canadian spy during the Cold War, teams up with former British secret service agent Valerie Koester (Elizabeth Shepherd) and return to the espionage business. Brook and Koester are also former lovers. Other characters include General (Mavor Moore), the Canadian secret service chief, and Graydon (Brian Linehan), the spies' manager, Carvallo (Steve Pernie), Janev (Lee Broker), Moffat (Gerry Crack), Theo (Arnie Achtman) and Miss Woods (Amelia Hall).

== Scheduling ==
Hour-long episodes were broadcast on Tuesdays at 10:00 p.m. from 16 September to 28 October 1980.

=== Episodes ===
- "Old Times' Sake" (part 1, part 2) – John Trent director
- "Like Father, Like Son"
- "Sanctuary"
- "Saving Grace"
- "The Judas Game"
- "Close Shave"
- "The Fourth Man"
