= Linden Soles =

Canadian television journalist (born 1956)

Linden Soles (born October 26, 1956, in Winnipeg, Manitoba) is a Canadian television journalist, best known to international audiences as an anchor on CNN. He was known for reporting the death of Diana, Princess of Wales on CNN.

His employment was terminated by the network in 1998 in a management shakeup by Rick Kaplan, after Kaplan concluded that the network had too many anchors for viewers to keep track of.

Prior to joining CNN in 1993, Soles worked for Canadian radio stations including CHIQ-FM Winnipeg and television stations including CKND-TV in Winnipeg, and both CKVU-TV and CHAN-TV in Vancouver, British Columbia. Soles also served for a time during the late 1970s as host of the CBC Radio program "90 Minutes With A Bullet".
