= Paul Bernard, Psychiatrist =

- Genre: Soap opera
- Written by: William Bankier; Vicki Branden; Lucille Chaplan; Jack Cunningham; Dennis Donovan; Tony Flanders; Cornne Langston; Barry Pearson; Grace Richardson; Les Rose; Michael Spivak; Warren Waxler; Valerie Wise
- Starring: Chris Wiggins
- Country of origin: Canada
- Original language: English
- No. of seasons: 1
- No. of episodes: 130

Production
- Producer: Michael Spivak
- Running time: 30 minutes
- Production companies: Jaylar Productions; Fremantle International

Original release
- Network: CBC Television
- Release: 13 September 1971 – 29 November 1972

Paul Bernard, Psychiatrist is a Canadian soap opera that aired on CBC Television from 1971 to 1972.

== Premise ==
Each episode portrayed a patient's appointment with psychiatrist Paul Bernard (Chris Wiggins) at his office. The patient, typically female, would lie on the doctor's couch and reveal her thoughts in keeping with the practices of psychoanalysis. Patients often reappeared on the series for approximately monthly follow-up visits. Script material was derived from Canadian Mental Health Association patient histories.

== Production ==
The series was produced by Michael Spivak (Science International) as a joint effort of his Jaylar Productions and Fremantle International for broadcast on CBC. Two pilot episodes were created prior to the full 130-episode production. Since the plot was limited to the doctor-patient dialogue within Bernard's office, the series was described as a "one-set semi-soap".

== Cast ==
Besides Wiggins, the following actors were cast as patients during the series run:

- Josephine Barrington
- Anna Cameron
- Marcia Diamond
- Nuala Fitzgerald
- Gale Garnett
- Dawn Greenhalgh
- Til Hanson
- Kay Hawtrey
- Valerie Jean Hume
- Barbara Kyle
- Carole Lazare
- Peggy Mahon
- Phyllis Marshall
- Paisley Maxwell
- Arlene Meadows
- Micki Moore
- Michele Oricoine
- Diane Polley
- Vivian Reis
- Shelley Sommers
- Tudi Wiggins

== Scheduling ==
This half-hour series was broadcast on CBC weekdays at 4:00 p.m. (Eastern) from 13 September 1971 to 14 January 1972. The series moved to the 2:00 p.m. time slot from 17 January to 29 November 1972.

The series was also purchased for broadcast in Australia, Hong Kong and the United States (selected CBS stations).
