= Deven Mack =

Canadian voice actor

Deven Mack** is a Canadian voice actor. He is known for voicing Dez in Wishfart and Sonic the Hedgehog (character) in Sonic Prime.
