= The Play's the Thing (TV series) =

- Genre: Drama
- Presented by: Gordon Pinsent
- Country of origin: Canada
- Original language: English
- No. of seasons: 1
- No. of episodes: 11

Production
- Running time: 60 minutes

Original release
- Network: CBC Television
- Release: 17 January – 28 March 1974

The Play's the Thing is a Canadian theatrical drama television series that aired on CBC Television in 1974.

== Premise ==
This anthology series was based on Canadian-written plays, especially from new playwrights.

== Scheduling ==
This hour-long series was broadcast Thursdays at 9:00 p.m. (Eastern) from 17 January to 28 March 1974 as follows:

| Date | Title | Writer | Director | Comments |
|---|---|---|---|---|
| 17 January 1974 | "How I met My Husband" | Alice Munro | Herb Roland | |
| 24 January 1974 | "The Bells of Hell" | Mordecai Richler | George Jonas | |
| 31 January 1974 | "And then Mr. Jones" | Morley Callaghan | Paddy Sampson | |
| 7 February 1974 | "Friends and Relations" | Hugh Hood | Rudi Dorn | |
| 14 February 1974 | "Brothers in the Black Art" | Robertson Davies | Mario Prizek | |
| 21 February 1974 | "The Man from Inner Space" | Eric Nicol | Paddy Sampson | |
| 28 February 1974 | "The Servant Girl" | Margaret Atwood | George Jonas | |
| 7 March 1974 | "Roundelay" | Pierre Berton | Rudi Dorn | |
| 14 March 1974 | "The Roncarelli Affair" | Mavor Moore | George McCowan | Dramatic portrayal of the Roncarelli v. Duplessis case, adapted from the writings of F. R. Scott who was part of Roncarelli's legal team |
| 21 March 1974 | "Back to Beulah" | W. O. Mitchell | Eric Till | |
| 28 March 1974 | "The Executioners" | Farley Mowat and Len Peterson | Rudi Dorn | Featured Inuit actors in a story which concerns a 1964 murder trial, documented by Farley Mowat for Maclean's magazine. |
