= Fred Sgambati =

Canadian radio personality (1921–1979)

Fred Sgambati (1921 – November 23, 1979) was a Canadian radio and television sports broadcaster, most noted as the winner of the ACTRA Foster Hewitt Award for excellence in sports broadcasting at the 5th ACTRA Awards in 1976.

Born and raised in Toronto, Ontario, he studied physical education at the University of Toronto in 1949. He then briefly worked for the university athletic department while studying for a teaching certificate, but put his plans to become a physical education teacher on hold to join Foster Hewitt's new sports radio station CKFH in 1951. He joined the Canadian Broadcasting Corporation in 1957, covering a variety of sporting events for both CBC Radio and CBC Television throughout his career, including collegiate and CFL football, NHL and international hockey, golf, figure skating, horse racing and bowling.

He was diagnosed with cancer in 1975 and underwent treatment, but continued to work as much as he was able, and served as a national campaign chair for the Canadian Cancer Society. He died of cancer in November 1979.

== Honours ==
In addition to the Foster Hewitt Award, he was posthumously inducted into the Canadian Football Hall of Fame as a media figure in 1989.

In honour of his passionate support of college and university athletics, the Canadian Intercollegiate Athletic Union named him as the recipient of its inaugural Cansave Award in 1979 shortly before his death, although due to Sgambati's health he was unable to attend the award ceremony in person, and the award was accepted on his behalf by wrestler Whipper Billy Watson. The award was renamed the Fred Sgambati Award in his honour, and is still to this day presented by U Sports as an annual award for distinguished achievement in journalistic coverage of collegiate sports.

An annual Fred Sgambati memorial golf tournament was launched in his memory as a fundraiser for the Canadian Cancer Society.

In 2010, the CBC named him to its own CBC Sports Hall of Fame.
