= The Canadian Establishment (TV series) =

Canadian television series

- Genre: Documentary
- Presented by: Patrick Watson
- Country of origin: Canada
- Original language: English
- No. of seasons: 1
- No. of episodes: 7

Production
- Executive producer: Cameron Graham
- Running time: 60 minutes

Original release
- Network: CBC Television
- Release: 21 September – 2 November 1980

The Canadian Establishment is a Canadian documentary television miniseries which aired on CBC Television in 1980.

== Premise ==
The series profiles the lives and work of wealthy Canadians. It is based on Peter C. Newman's book, The Canadian Establishment whose first volume was published in 1975.

Patrick Watson was the series host and narrator.

== Production ==
The $1 million series had one of the highest CBC Television project budgets of its time.

== Scheduling ==
Hour-long episodes were first broadcast on Sundays at 9 p.m. (Eastern) from 21 September to 2 November 1980. The series was repeated in 1981 between May and July.

The series was broadcast in the United States on WNYC-TV from April to May 1985.

== Episodes ==
No.	Title	Original release date
1	"Ten Toronto Street"	21 September 1980
Conrad Black becomes chairman of Argus Corporation following the death of John A. "Bud" McDougald.
2	"Shoemaker to the World"	28 September 1980
Thomas J. Bata of Bata Shoes
3	"Store Wars"	5 October 1980
Simpsons' Allan Burton recounts the sale of his department store to the Hudson's Bay Company and the subsequent involvement of the Thomson Corporation
4	"To Whom Much Is Given"	12 October 1980
A comparison between Canada's present and past wealth.
5	"The Best Job in Canada"	19 October 1980
Ian Sinclair, chairman of Canadian Pacific Railway
6	"The Little Guy From Sudbury"	26 October 1980
Paul Desmarais, CEO of Power Corporation of Canada
7	"The Establishment Challenged"	2 November 1980
The growing concentration of Calgary's millionaires and their effect on the national economy.
