= Len Peterson =

Canadian novelist, playwright, screenwriter and novelist (1917–2008)

Leonard Byron Peterson (March 15, 1917 – February 28, 2008) was a Canadian novelist, playwright, and screenwriter.

Peterson wrote more than a thousand different dramatic works for film, radio stage, and television.

== Early life and education ==
A native of Regina, Saskatchewan, Peterson attended Luther College in Regina; Northwestern University in Evanston, Illinois; and served in the Canadian Infantry Corps during World War II.

== Career ==
His career started in 1939 when he sold a script to the Canadian Broadcasting Corporation; one of his earliest successes was the radio play They're All Afraid (1944), which was written for the CBC Radio program Stage '44. The play received much criticism for depicting life in Canada negatively at a time when it was thought that boosting wartime morale was more appropriate. They're All Afraid went on to win the award for best drama in a broadcasting festival in Ohio. It was later adapted by Peterson for the stage.

In addition to his writing, Peterson was a key figure in the establishment of both the trade union ACTRA and the charity Playwrights Guild of Canada.

=== Award ===
He was the winner of ACTRA's John Drainie Award for distinguished lifetime contributions to Canadian broadcasting at the 3rd ACTRA Awards in 1974.

=== Novels ===
- Chipmunk (1949)

=== Plays ===
- Burlap Bags (1960)
- The Great Hunger (1960)
- Look Ahead! (1962)
- All About Us (1963)
- Almighty Voice (1970)
- Women in the Attic (1971)
- The Workingman (1972)
- Let's Make a World (1973)
- Billy Bishop and the Red Baron (1975)
- Your World on a Plastic Platter (1976)
- Etienne Brule (1977)
- They're All Afraid (1980)
- Eye of the Storm (1985)

=== Radio shows ===
- Stage '44 (1943)
- Nightfall (1981)

=== Screenplays ===
- It's Fun to Sing (1948)
- Passport to Canada (1949)
- Iron from the North (1955)

=== Television shows ===
- The Executioners
- Folio
- General Motors Presents
- Camera Canada
