= John Drainie Award =

Discontinued annual Canadian media award

- Awarded for: Significant contribution to broadcasting in Canada
- Country: Canada
- Presented by: ACTRA (1968–1985, 2000s–), Academy of Canadian Cinema and Television (1986–2000)
- Reward: Plaque with John Drainie's likeness
- First award: 1968
- Most recent winner: Mack Furlong (2014)

The John Drainie Award was an award given to an individual who has made a significant contribution to broadcasting in Canada. Although meant to be presented annually, there have been years where it was not presented.

Originally created by ACTRA in 1968 as a standalone award, the award was named in memory of Canadian actor John Drainie following his death in 1966, and was presented as part of the Canadian Film Awards ceremonies for its first four years. Beginning in 1972 it was presented as part of the expanded ACTRA Awards program.

The award was transferred in 1986 to the Academy of Canadian Cinema and Television and presented as part of the Gemini Awards; the award was later transferred back to the ACTRA Awards in the 2000s, and presented as part of the Banff Television Festival.

Unlike other awards which are voted on by the Academy's board of directors, the recipient of the John Drainie Award was selected by a committee of previous winners. Any branch of the Academy's Television Division may put forth nominations to the Drainie Committee for consideration. The recipient receives a plaque with Drainie's likeness rather than a Gemini statuette. It was presented posthumously on some occasions but current ACTRA policy is to present this award to living people.

== Winners ==
The following people have won the award since 1968.

=== Canadian Film Awards ===
- 1968: Esse Ljungh, W. O. Mitchell, Jean Murray, Tommy Tweed
- 1969: Andrew Allan
- 1970: Harry J. Boyle
- 1971: Lister Sinclair

=== ACTRA Awards ===
- 1972: Graham Spry
- 1973: Rupert Caplan
- 1974: Len Peterson
- 1975: Robert Weaver
- 1976: Jane Mallett
- 1977: John Reeves
- 1978: Wayne and Shuster
- 1979: Ruth Springford
- 1980: Norman Campbell
- 1981: Frances Hyland
- 1982: Mavor Moore
- 1983: Lucio Agostini
- 1984: Robert Christie
- 1985: Fred Diehl
- 1986: Bernard Cowan

=== Gemini Awards ===
- 1986: Pat Patterson
- 1987: Ross McLean
- 1988: Davidson Dunton
- 1989: Peter Gzowski
- 1990: Allan McFee
- 1991: not presented
- 1992: Gordon Pinsent
- 1993: Barbara Frum
- 1994: Max Ferguson
- 1995: Knowlton Nash
- 1996: Dodi Robb
- 1997: Joe Schlesinger
- 1998 (Mar): Peter Herrndorf
- 1998 (Oct): Bernie Lucht
- 1999: Pierre Berton
- 2000: Shelagh Rogers

=== Banff World Media Festival ===
- 2001: not presented
- 2002: David Suzuki
- 2003: Jim Murray
- 2004: Daryl Duke
- 2005: Vicki Gabereau
- 2006: Wendy Mesley
- 2008: Carol Off
- 2011: Barbara Budd
- 2014: Mack Furlong

== See also ==
- Canadian television awards
