= Pierre Berton =

Canadian author (1920–2004)

Pierre Berton CC OOnt
- Berton and Ruby in their later years at Kleinburg, Ontario
- Born: Pierre Francis de Marigny Berton; July 12, 1920; Whitehorse, Yukon, Canada
- Died: November 30, 2004 (aged 84); Toronto, Ontario, Canada
- Resting place: Kleinburg, Ontario, Canada (cremated ashes scattered)
- Education: University of British Columbia
- Occupations: Author, journalist, broadcaster
- Spouse: Janet Berton (m. 1946)
- Children: 8
- Writing career
- Genres: Canadiana, Canadian history
- Notable awards: Companion of the Order of Canada; Order of Ontario; Governor General's Award for English-language non-fiction (1956, 1958, 1971, 1988); John Drainie Award; Stephen Leacock Memorial Medal for Humour; Gabrielle Léger Award for Lifetime Achievement in Heritage Conservation; National Newspaper Award; Governor General’s History Award

Pierre Francis de Marigny Berton (July 12, 1920 – November 30, 2004) was a Canadian historian, writer, journalist and broadcaster. Berton wrote 50 best-selling books, mainly about Canadiana, Canadian history and popular culture. He also wrote critiques of mainstream religion, anthologies, children's books and historical works for youth. He was a reporter and war correspondent, an editor at Maclean's Magazine and The Toronto Star and, for 39 years, a panelist on Front Page Challenge. He was a founder of the Writers' Trust of Canada, and won many honours and awards.

== Early years ==
Berton was born on July 12, 1920, in Whitehorse, Yukon, where his father had moved for the 1898 Klondike Gold Rush. His family moved to Dawson City, Yukon in 1921. His mother, Laura Beatrice Berton (maiden name Laura Beatrice Thompson), was a schoolteacher in Toronto until she was offered a job as a teacher in Dawson City at the age of 29 in 1907. She met Frank Berton in the nearby mining town of Granville shortly after settling in Dawson and teaching kindergarten. Laura Beatrice Berton's autobiography of life in the Yukon entitled I Married the Klondike was published in her later years and gave her what her son Pierre describes as "a modicum of fame, which she thoroughly enjoyed." At the time, Dawson City was a highly remote place. After visiting Dawson City in the summer of 1939 to see some old friends, it took Berton a week to go from Dawson City to Whitehorse as the only means of transport was an old paddle-wheeler named the Casca that moved slowly up the Yukon River. Growing up in Dawson City, which had briefly during the Klondike gold rush of the 1890s been one of Canada's largest cities, left Berton with an eye for the colourful. During his childhood he encountered numerous eccentric people who had gone north during the gold rush and ended up staying in Dawson City after the gold rush ended.

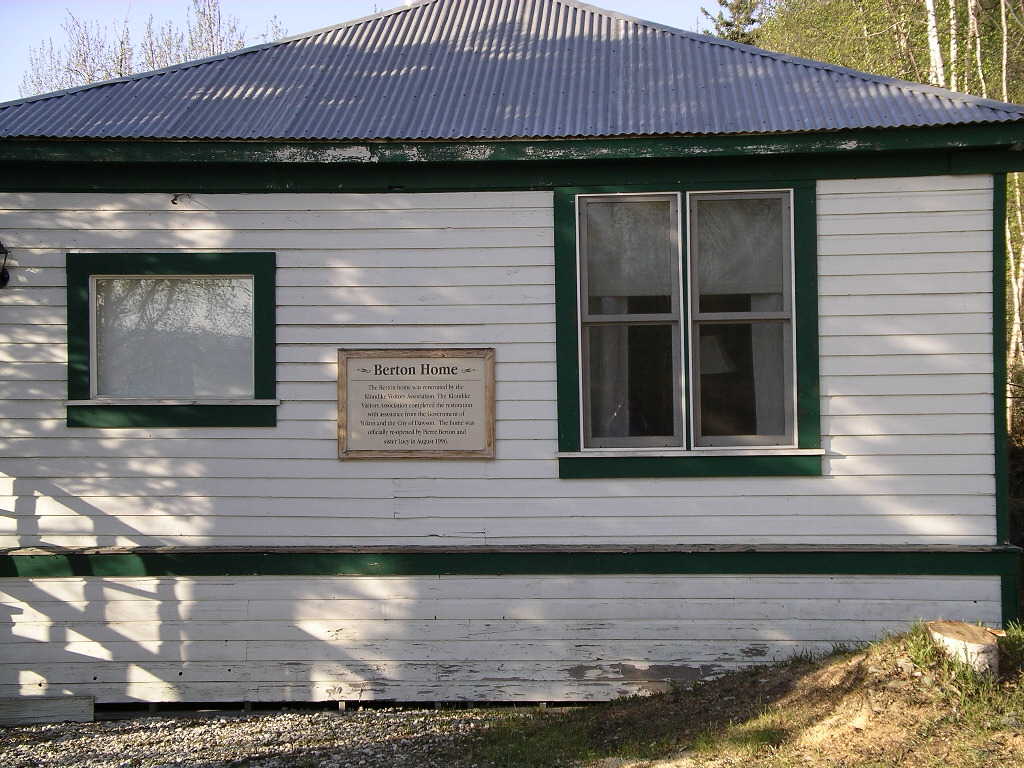
Pierre Berton's childhood home in Dawson City

Berton's family moved to Victoria, British Columbia in 1932. At age 12, he joined the Scout Movement. Berton later wrote that "The Scout Movement was the making of me". He credited Scouting with keeping him from becoming a juvenile delinquent. He started his journalism career in scouting and later wrote that "the first newspaper I was ever associated with was a weekly typewritten publication issued by the Seagull Patrol of St. Mary's Troop." He remained in scouting for seven years and wrote about his experiences in an article titled "My Love Affair with the Scout Movement". Like his father, Pierre Berton worked in Klondike mining camps during his years as a history major at the University of British Columbia, where he also worked on the student paper The Ubyssey.

== Early career ==
He spent his early newspaper career in Vancouver, where at 21 he was the youngest city editor on any Canadian daily, at the Vancouver News-Herald, replacing editorial staff that had been called up to serve in the Second World War. On 7 December 1941, the Japanese Navy bombed the American naval base at Pearl Harbor while on the same day, the Japanese Army invaded the British colonies of Hong Kong and Malaya. The extent and rapidity of the Japanese victories in the winter of 1941–1942 came as a considerable surprise, and Berton stated that from his vantage in Vancouver that the war felt much closer than it had done before. In February 1942, he noted Japanese-Canadians being held in Vancouver's Hastings Park prior to being sent to internment camps in the interior of the province. Meanwhile all over Greater Vancouver the businesses and homes of Japanese-Canadians were seized by the federal government, which proceeded to promptly auction off most of the assets it seized.

Berton himself was conscripted into the Canadian Army under the National Resources Mobilization Act in 1942 and attended basic training in British Columbia, nominally as a reinforcement soldier intended for The Seaforth Highlanders of Canada. Under the National Resources Mobilization Act, the government had the power to impose conscription for the defence of Canada and only volunteers were sent to fight overseas until late 1944. The men who were conscripted and chose to remain in Canada were popularly known as "the Zombies", a term that was highly disparaging. Because the "Zombies" refused to fight overseas, in many quarters they were viewed as cowards. He elected to "go Active" (the euphemism for volunteering for overseas service). By 1942, the Axis powers were winning the war, and Berton came to feel that the two very different visions of the world offered up by the respective sides were such that he had to take a stand by "going active", instead of remaining safely in Canada as a "Zombie". His aptitude as a soldier was such that he was appointed Lance Corporal and attended NCO school, and became a basic training instructor in the rank of corporal. Due to a background in university Canadian Officers' Training Corps (COTC) and inspired by other citizen-soldiers who had been commissioned, he sought training as an officer.

Berton spent the next several years attending a variety of military courses, becoming, in his words, the most highly trained officer in the military. He was warned for overseas duty many times, and was granted embarkation leave many times, each time finding his overseas draft being cancelled. A coveted trainee slot with the Canadian Intelligence Corps saw Berton, now a Captain, trained to act as an Intelligence Officer (IO), and after a stint as an instructor at the Royal Military College in Kingston, Ontario, he finally went overseas in March 1945. In the UK, he was told that he would have to requalify as an IO because the syllabus in the UK was different from that in the intelligence school in Canada. By the time Berton had requalified, the war in Europe had ended.

He volunteered for the Canadian Army Pacific Force (CAPF), granted a final "embarkation leave", and found himself no closer to combat employment by the time the Japanese surrendered in September 1945.

== Print journalism ==
=== Vancounver Sun ===
In 1947, he went on an expedition to the Nahanni River with pilot Russ Baker. Berton's account for the Vancouver Sun was picked up by International News Service, making him a noted adventure-travel writer.

=== Maclean's ===
==== Reporting on Japanese Canadian internment ====
On 1 February 1948, an article by Berton appeared in Maclean's under the title "They're Only Japs", which was the first account of the internment of Japanese Canadians to appear in the Canadian media that provided interviews with some of the interned people. Most notably, Berton interviewed Marie Suzuki, a second-generation Japanese Canadian school-teacher whose career had been ruined by the internment. Berton was quite critical of the decision made by Prime Minister William Lyon Mackenzie King to order the internment on 24 February 1942 that saw all Japanese Canadians interned, regardless if they were immigrants or Canadian-born, unlike the case-by-case policy with interning German Canadians and the partial internment of Italian Canadians that saw all Italian immigrants interned. Berton's article was also the first to note that greed was a major factor behind the demand for the internment as many of the people in British Columbia who agitated for total internment of all Japanese Canadians were very interested in seizing their assets for themselves.

==== War correspondent in Korea ====
In 1951, Berton covered the Korean War as the war correspondent of Maclean's. To make up for not seeing action in World War Two, Berton was highly keen to work as a war correspondent and lobbied Ralph Allen, the editor of Maclean's, to go to Korea as soon as the Korean War started in 1950. In late 1950, Berton wrote profiles in Maclean's of the two commanding officers of the all-volunteer Canadian Special Brigade, namely Brigadier John Meredith Rockingham and Colonel Jacques Dextraze, which were highly flattering to the subjects of his profiles and led the Canadian Army to expect that Berton would take a pro-war line in his reportage. In February 1951, Berton's profile of Rockingham was published in Maclean's under the title "Rocky" noted that Rockingham was a highly decorated Second World War veteran who had won the Distinguished Service Order at Dieppe in 1942 who was much liked and respected by the men who served under him.

The arrival of Canadian Special Brigade at the front in February 1951 finally provided the occasion for him to work as a war correspondent. Berton arrived in South Korea in March 1951 at a critical moment as the Chinese had just taken Seoul and were preparing for a spring offensive that was launched in April 1951 that was aimed at winning the war by driving out United Nations forces of Korea. The Chinese Spring Offensive was launched, which saw the Anglo-Canadian-Australian-New Zealander 27th Infantry Commonwealth Brigade in the thick of the fighting. After the failure of the Chinese spring offensive, the United Nations launched a counter-offensive that saw Seoul retaken. By June 1951, the war had reached a stalemate and negotiations were opened for an armistice, which took two years to conclude with the armistice finally being signed on 27 July 1953.

During the stalemate phase of the war, both sides sought limited advantages to improve their bargaining positions in the armistice talks by capturing hills, which improved the tactical situation while having no impact on the wider strategical situation in Korea. Berton in his reportage noted that the Canadian soldiers were frustrated by the "war of the hills", complaining that it seemed pointless to them to be used essentially as pawns to improve the bargaining positions in the armistice talks by fighting to capture or hold some barren hill in Korea. Berton reported that the average Canadian soldier in Korea hated their Chinese enemies, but had a grudging respect for their fighting abilities while holding their South Korean allies in complete and utter contempt as the South Koreans always broke under Chinese assaults. Berton also noted, but was prevented by censorship from saying that though the Canadian soldiers respected the British, Australians and New Zealand soldiers they served alongside, but held a lower opinion of the U.S. Army. The majority of American soldiers in Korea were teenage draftees, who generally came from the more poorer and less educated elements of American society, which led to morale problems. Berton's experiences in Korea left him with a dislike for the U.S. Army, whose mostly white and middle-class officers he charged were callous in their treatment of their own soldiers, especially if they were black or Hispanic. Berton was to later write in the 1990s that all of the problems that the U.S. Army had experienced during the Vietnam war such as morale issues, racial tensions, drug use, and a wide gap between officers and other ranks he had seen first-hand in Korea, led to his conclusion that the U.S. Army had failed to learn anything from the Korean war.

Though most of the Canadians in Korea routinely referred to the Koreans as "gooks", Berton's articles often mentioned the suffering of Korean civilians such as one profile he did of a Mrs. Sook whose son was shot by the North Koreans in 1950 when he refused to join the North Korean People's Army, leaving her broken and destitute. In another article entitled "Seoul, the saddest city in the world" Berton described the war devastated city of Seoul as being in ruins with the people living there reduced to begging to stay alive and that the deeply corrupt South Korean government of President Syngman Rhee had no interest in helping its own people.

Berton complied with the requests of the military censors during his time in Korea, altering one story about the killing of 60 black American soldiers in a Chinese raid that began with the line "Killed in their sleeping bags with their boots on" to instead say that the 60 American soldiers were heroically killed in battle resisting the Chinese raid. Berton came to deeply dislike the censorship that he was faced during the Korean war, complaining that he was writing reports that were full of lies and half-truths. Despite agreeing to the requests of the censors, Berton's reports focusing on the bleakness and savagery of the Korean War led to accusations that he was anti-war, and hence pro-Communist. Berton was later to write that though he had much respect for the Canadian veterans of Korea, he felt that Canada's involvement in the Korean war was a major mistake.

==== Managing editor and columnist ====
At the age of 31 he was named managing editor of Maclean's.

In January 1963, Berton started to work as a Maclean's columnist, where the other writers such as Robert Fulford and Peter Gzowski wanted to have him fired because the often frivolous and trivial nature of his columns was felt to be embarrassing. In May 1963, Berton was fired from Maclean's for a column he wrote entitled "It's time we stopped hoaxing the kids about sex", where he wrote that he would not object if his teenage daughters engaged in premarital sex, saying he hoped that they had enough wisdom to use a comfortable bed instead of a dingy backseat of a car. The column, which was intended as a criticism of sexualized advertising as Berton contended that teenage sex was the logical consequence of sexualized marketing, provoked national outrage and led to calls for a boycott of Maclean's if Berton continued to write. Berton always felt that being fired was unjustified, especially because the editors of Maclean's had wanted him to write provocative columns about contemporary issues to boost circulation.

=== Toronto Star ===
Berton joined the Toronto Star as associate editor of the Star Weekly and columnist for the daily paper in 1958.

Following the Sharpeville massacre of 21 March 1960, when the South African police opened fire on a crowd of black South Africans protesting apartheid, killing 69 people while wounding about 180 people, Berton was one of the speakers at a fundraiser at Massey Hall that sought to raise money to treat those wounded in the massacre. Greatly shaken by the massacre, Berton used his column to criticize the apartheid system in South Africa, writing: "The time has come for this country to finally take a stand on South Africa". At the time, there was a split within the Commonwealth (considered more important at the time than today) between its predominately white members such as Britain, Australia, and New Zealand who wanted South Africa to stay vs. nonwhite members such as India, Pakistan, Ghana, and Malaya who were pressing to have South Africa expelled while Canada initially equivocated about where it stood. At the time, there were concerns that the question of South African membership might cause the break-up of the Commonwealth. Berton argued that Canada should side with the nonwhite bloc and use its influence to have South Africa expelled from the Commonwealth and not be permitted to return until apartheid ended.

In 1960, he performed an experiment, which demonstrated widespread anti-Semitism in the resort industry when he first mailed out a letter under the name Sol Cohen to 106 resorts in the Ontario countryside, asking to stay for two weeks, and the next day he mailed another set of letters to the same resorts under the name D.M. Douglas, again asking to stay for two weeks. The majority of the letters sent out under the name Cohen received the reply that the resorts were all booked up and there was no space or alternatively did not answer at all. By contrast, the majority of the letters sent out under the name Douglas all received the replies that he could stay for the requested two weeks. Berton compared the replies he received, noting there was a frosty tone to the replies to the Cohen letters while there was more warmth in the replies to the Douglas letters. Only the Green Gables lodge in Muskoka had been willing to allow Berton under the name Cohen to stay. In his column, Berton named all of the resorts that they were willing to rent to someone with the typically Scottish surname of Douglas while refusing to rent to someone with the typically Jewish surname of Cohen. The column provoked much discussion at the time, and led to demands to end the anti-Semitic policies of the resort owners.

In 1960, he visited Japan as part of his duties as a Toronto Star columnist to investigate Japan 15 years after the end of World War Two, where he was stunned by Japanese economic miracle as he noted all of the Japanese cities had been rebuilt after having bombed to utter ruin during the war. Berton visited Hiroshima and its Peace Memorial, where he found himself sickened by the photographs of the survivors of the atomic bombing of that city, writing that:

"for sheer horror it outdoes everything save the relics of Belsen and Buchenwald...I seemed to feel the little eyes of the Japanese boring into my back as I stared at those terrible pictures of heaped and peeling human bodies...The Germans, we are told, were stunned by motion pictures of the extermination camps. No sensitive Westerner can escape the same sense of guilt in the museum of Hiroshima. We roasted people to death over a slow fire. We tortured them just as surely as the Nazis tortured the Jews".

The comparison of the atomic bombing of Hiroshima to the Holocaust provoked controversy. Berton expressed much sadness in his columns about the fading of traditional Japanese culture as he noted the most popular form of plastic surgery for Japanese women was making their eyes appear Western; that Western music was being played everywhere including Shinto shrines; and the "this typical Japanese family [that he had stayed with] was about typical as John David Eaton's would be in Toronto". As a columnist, he turned the beating of the gambler Maxie Bluestein by the gangster Johnny Papalia on 21 March 1961 who used a steel pipe to nearly beat Bluestein to death in public into a cause célèbre. Berton called the beating of Bluestein a "semi-execution" brazenly committed in the front lobby of the popular Town Tavern nightclub of Toronto, and demanded that the police bring Papalia to justice despite the unwillingness of nearly 100 witnesses to testify. Berton described the beating:

"...as terrible a beating as it is possible to give a man without killing him...Iron bars with ropes attached to them for greater leverage rained down on Bluestein's head and across his forehead, eyes and cheekbones. His scalp was split seven or eight times. Knuckledusters were smashed into his eyes and a broken bottle was ground into his mouth. When Bluestein dropped to the floor, he was kicked in the face. His overcoat, torn and slashed, was literally drenched in his own blood... When I saw Bluestein, some 10 days after the affair, he looked like a piece of meat".

Papalia finally turned himself in as the case was attracting too much media attention for the comfort of his underworld associates.

== Television, film and recordings ==
=== Early television, film and recordings ===
In 1957, he became a key member of the CBC's public affairs flagship program, Close-Up along with Charles Templeton, who became a longtime friend and broadcasting partner. Berton became a permanent panelist on the popular television show Front Page Challenge.

That same year, he also narrated the Academy Award-nominated National Film Board of Canada documentary City of Gold, exploring life in his hometown of Dawson City during the Klondike Gold Rush. He then released an album in conjunction with Folkways Records, entitled The Story of the Klondike: Stampede for Gold – The Golden Trail.

In April 1959, Berton went to Cairo with a camera crew from the Close-Up television show with the aim of interviewing President Gamal Abdel Nasser who turned out to be unwilling to be interviewed. To relieve the boredom as he waited for an entire month to interview Nasser, Berton had the Close-Up camera crew make a documentary about life in Egypt, which he credited with broadening his perspective.

=== The Pierre Berton Show ===
Berton left the Star in 1962 to commence The Pierre Berton Show, which ran until 1973.

In 1963, Berton received death threats when an episode about the Front de libération du Québec (FLQ) aired on The Pierre Berton Show. The show featured an interview with Sergeant Walter "Rocky" Leja of the Canadian Army, who had been badly injured when he attempted to dismantle a bomb planted by the FLQ in Montreal. The same episode featured an interview with Pierre Trudeau, at the time a law professor at the Université de Montréal. In his interview with Berton, Trudeau stated that Quebec had received a "raw deal" from the rest of Canada, but went on to denounce Quebec separatism. Trudeau stated that the FLQ's claims that Quebec's situation was analogous to Algeria under French rule (with the FLQ playing the same role as the FLN) was nonsense; he said that French-Canadians like himself had nothing remotely like the status of Algerian Muslims under French rule. Trudeau stated that if Quebec became independent, it would be a "banana republic". Berton's interview with Trudeau is credited with first introducing him to an English-Canadian audience.

In 1964, an episode of The Pierre Berton Show attracted national controversy when Berton examined the subject of homosexuality, which was illegal in Canada at the time. Berton interviewed several American homosexuals (no Canadian gays were willing to appear on the show) about their lifestyles, but the CBC would not air the episode again after receiving a flood of complaints.

Berton was able to persuade famous people to appear on his television show; in September 1964, during a visit to London, Berton interviewed the philosopher Bertrand Russell, the actress Vivien Leigh, the singer Noël Coward and the actor Douglas Fairbanks Jr.

In November 1964, Berton devoted an episode of his show to the youth culture of Britain, which had attracted worldwide attention following the success of the Beatles. In the episode, Berton unknowingly scored a scoop when he interviewed Mick Jagger and the other members of the newly-formed Rolling Stones. When Berton asked Jagger about the charge that he was a bad influence on young people, he replied, "I don't feel morally responsible for anyone". The episode was credited with helping to popularize hairstyles and clothing associated with the mods and rockers, the two major sub-cultures within British culture at the time.

Like many journalists, Berton was interested in the "Banks affair", concerning an American gangster, Hal C. Banks, who, with the support of the Canadian government, had been allowed to take over the Communist-dominated Seafarers International Union in 1949. The way that Banks had operated as a sort of state-sanctioned criminal who had been allowed to engage in many acts of violence was immensely controversial. In an episode aired on 22 November 1964, Berton pressed Prime Minister Lester B. Pearson about the Banks affair, leading Pearson to admit that Banks had been a major campaign donor to the Liberal Party in the 1950s, which Pearson had denied up until that time.

Starting in December 1964, Berton started to broadcast a Christmas special on his TV show from his home in Kleinburg, covering his family's celebration of Christmas.

The Pierre Berton Show was a popular television show owing to famous guests from Canada and around the world. In the 1968–1969 season, Berton interviewed from the United States the burlesque entertainer Gypsy Rose Lee, the actress Sharon Tate, the pornographer Bob Guccione, the "playmate novelist" Alice Denham, the actor Charlton Heston, and Rachel Jones (an airline stewardess who was presented at the time as one of the co-authors of the bestselling 1967 pseudo-memoir Coffee, Tea or Me? detailing her supposed erotic history). That season, Canadian guests included the singer Neil Young, Montreal mayor Jean Drapeau, the journalist Laurier LaPierre, the columnist Peter C. Newman and the feminist activist June Callwood.

In early 1969, Berton's show aired a five-part series called The Indian Revolution, about the emerging Red Power movement. One of the episodes, The Rape of the Languages, featured an early expose of the residential schools. Berton interviewed several First Nations people in support of his thesis that indigenous peoples had been "beaten, starved, and otherwise punished by church and federal schools". The choice of guests and themes that season reflected what had become the show's main focus, namely a mixture of "celebrities, sex, and social justice".

In 1971, Berton interviewed Bruce Lee, the famous martial artist's only surviving television interview. Berton's television career included spots as host and writer on My Country, The Great Debate, Heritage Theatre, The Secret of My Success and The National Dream.

=== Radio ===
From 1966 to 1983, Berton and long-time collaborator Charles Templeton made the daily syndicated radio debate show Dialogue, based first at CFRB and later at CKEY. Previously, in the late-1950s and early-1960s, Berton and Templeton had separately presented 20 commentaries a week for All-Canada Radio, a national radio syndication service. The segments generally ran between 40 and 75 seconds and dealt with current affairs, editorials and other topical subjects.

== Books ==
=== The Mysterious North ===
In the 1950s, he published a series of articles in Maclean's that was later turned into his 1956 book The Mysterious North, which recounted his experiences in the far north of Canada in a highly romanticized way. The book had only modest sales, but it led to Berton being perceived within the Canadian media as an expert on the far north, causing him to appear on television in that capacity.

=== Klondike The Last Great Gold Rush ===
In 1958, he published his best-selling book Klondike The Last Great Gold Rush, a social history about the Klondike gold rush. Berton traced the appalling hardships faced by the thousands of people who came from around the world to seek their fortunes in the Klondike, the vast majority of whom failed to achieve their dreams of riches. Berton also covered the rise and fall of Dawson City, a boomtown that was full of bars, brothels and gambling halls that catered to the gold prospectors, giving it a disreputable reputation both at the time and since. The book's hero was the tough and stern Colonel Sam Steele, the Yukon commissioner of the North-West Mounted Police, a policeman with an almost legendary reputation who upheld law and order during the gold rush. Berton's background as someone who grew up in the Yukon added to the book's appeal as many reviewers praised Klondike The Last Great Gold Rush for its sense of "authenticity".

=== The Secret World Of Og ===
In 1961, Berton wrote a children's book, The Secret World Of Og based on the whimsical stories he told his daughters in the 1950s. Berton's publisher, Jack McClelland, was skeptical about the sales potential of The Secret World of Og, which he reluctantly published in the fall of 1961, apparently as a favour to Berton. The book turned out be very popular, selling out its first print run of 8,284 copies by the summer of 1962, and by the 1980s The Secret World of Og had sold 70,000 copies worldwide, making it into one of Berton's most successful books. Berton always answered the fan mail he received from children who liked The Secret World of Og right up to his death, which was the only fan mail that he consistently answered.

=== The Comfortable Pew ===
In 1965, Berton published a best-selling book, The Comfortable Pew, which was quite critical of the Anglican Church, whose teachings Berton condemned as sanctimonious, conformist, submissive to power, and hypocritical with respect to sexuality and other social issues. Within weeks of its publication, the book's first print run of 100,000 copies sold out, making Berton about $25,000. At the time, the Church of England was one of the leading social institutions in English-Canadian society, and the book produced a storm of controversy as Berton urged church leaders to accept birth control, premarital sex and homosexuality. Berton called for the Anglican Church to accept what he called "real Christian love, in all its flexibility, with all of its concern for real people rather than for any fixed set of principles".

The controversy caused by The Comfortable Pew made Berton an ubiquitous figure in Canadian media, leading the columnist Denis Braithwaite to complain in The Globe & Mail that Canadians were now living in the "Berton era". Braithwaite wrote: "Virtually every media outlet is preoccupied with Pierre Berton and his new book. We get Berton in the morning and Berton at night. He is in the book section, the religion section, the TV section of our daily newspapers; he is the subject of feature articles and gossipy items in the national magazines; he is interviewed by every disc jockey, advice to the housewife dispenser, numerologist and pitchmen on every radio station in the land; he is on every television program, on every Canadian television channel, not just once in a while or two or three times a day, but all day, everyday-or so it seems. Our children lisp his name, our teenagers take his advice on sex; our wives curtsey to his image".

=== The National Dream and The Last Spike ===
In 1968, Berton became concerned that his books dealing with contemporary issues would become dated and forgotten with the passage of time. He noted that Klondike, his account of the Klondike gold rush of the 1890s, had a more timeless quality since it covered a subject that would not become dated, and indeed was the subject of enduring popular fascination. At the same time, he noted that with the notable exceptions of Donald Creighton and W. L. Morton, Canada had no story-teller historians who wrote popular and accessible narratives of Canadian history. For reasons of pride and Canadian nationalism, Berton set out to become a story-teller historian who would write books for a mass audience.

For his first book, his subject was the building of the Canadian Pacific Railway (CPR) in the 19th century, which he intended as a national epic. Berton wanted to give the struggle to build the CPR a role analogous to that of the Revolutionary War in American memory, as the founding national epic. In this regard, Berton acknowledged the importance of Confederation in 1867, but argued that Canada did not truly become a nation until the CPR was completed in 1885. Berton defined the building of the railroad as a struggle of man against nature, seeing it as a triumph of human ingenuity and willpower, as the builders defeated the harsh landscape of northern Ontario, the seemingly endless Prairies, and the imposing Rocky Mountains.

In the spring of 1968, Berton began his research for his railroad saga, which became The National Dream and The Last Spike. In July 1969, Berton had the telephone removed from his house in Kleinburg, and claimed he was leaving for Mexico. He spent the summer of 1969 writing his railroad epic, which came to be divided into two volumes owing to its length with his work finally being finished in December 1969.

In 1970, book one of Berton's epic about the building of the CPR, The National Dream was published, becoming a great critical and commercial success by 1971. Book two of the series, The Last Spike, was published in 1971 and was even more successful with the public. The success of The Last Spike transformed Berton into a sort of "national institution" as he became the popular story-teller historian that he set out to be. Such was the popularity of The Last Spike that in 1972 that stores sold mementoes related to the book, which was most unusual for a history book.

In a review, the American historian Ralph Hidy wrote that Berton's railroad saga was an "essentially sound" history that was relatively free of errors. Hidy stated that though Berton broke no new ground in his railroad saga, his work was very "lively" and carried "the reader through one cliff-hanging situation after another". The sections dealing with the building of the Rocky mountains section of the CPR are generally considered to be the vivid and exciting part of Berton's railroad epic. Berton described how the railroad builders had to quite literally blast and hack their way through the sheer granite of the Rocky mountains, which was an extremely difficult, dangerous and arduous task, given the technology of the time. Hidy wrote that as a work of narrative popular history, Berton succeeded admirably in telling the story of the construction of the CPR over daunting odds, and in impressing the reader as to why the building of the CPR, which was completed five years ahead of schedule, was considered one of the great engineering feats of the 19th century. However, other historians were more critical. Michael Bliss felt that Berton's picture of the Prime Minister, Sir John A. MacDonald, was too colored by hero-worship as Bliss in a critical review stated that Berton went beyond even Creighton (whose two-volume biography of MacDonald was very sympathetic towards its subject) in portraying MacDonald as the heroic prime minister.

=== The Invasion of Canada and Flames Across the Border ===
In common with many other Canadians, Berton found the 1970s to be an unpleasant decade as the recession caused by the Arab oil shock of 1973–1974 put an end to the "long summer" of prosperity that had begun in 1945 while the election of the separatist PQ government in Quebec in 1976 led to doubts about whatever Canada would even last as a nation. By 1979, on the threshold of a new decade that seemed to promise only more trouble, Berton came to feel that Canada needed another national epic to give hope in dark and uncertain times.

As the subject of his new national epic, Berton chose the War of 1812 with the first of his books, The Invasion of Canada dealing with the subject being published in 1980, and the second one, Flames Across the Border in 1981. Berton chose to interpret the War of 1812 as not a war between the United States and Great Britain which just happened to be fought in North America, but rather as the beginning of a Canadian national identity. Though Berton's nationalist interpretation of the War of 1812 was not accepted by most historians it certainly appealed to the Canadian public and his books dealing with the War of 1812 sold very well.

=== The Promised Land ===
In his 1984 book The Promised Land, he covered the settlement of the Prairie provinces in the late 19th and early 20th centuries. Pierre set out to debunk the heroic image of the colonization of the West by focusing on the hardships and suffering of the farmers who could be easily ruined by crop failures. He focused instead on the tenacity and sheer determination of the settlers and provided a new heroic image of the settlement of the West.

=== Vimy ===
In 1986, he published Vimy, which was one of his more successful books dealing with the Battle of Vimy Ridge in 1917. Berton provoked much controversy that his thesis that Vimy may have been a great victory that saw all the four divisions of the Canadian corps fight together for the first time to achieve what had been considered an impossible task, namely to take the heavily fortified Vimy ridge that towered about the Douai plain, but the victory was not worth the sacrifices of thousands of young men who were either killed or wounded. Berton noted that 1 out of 10 Canadians who stormed up the heights of Vimy Ridge on 9 April 1917 was either killed or wounded, leading him to the conclusion that it would be better if the battle had not been fought at all.

=== Later books ===
In 1992, he published Niagara: A History, a social history dealing with the people associated with the Niagara Falls together with a follow-up picture book of Niagara falls in 1993. Unlike his other books, the Niagara books sold poorly, which marked the beginning of his decline from his position as Canada's preeminent public intellectual.

The decline of the appeal of his books was linked to the decline of the "new nationalism" he had been associated with. Berton almost seemed to acknowledge the decline of the "new nationalism" in his 1997 book 1967 The Last Good Year, arguing that the Centennial year of 1967 was the highpoint of Canadian history and everything that had happened since 1967 had been a story of decline and decay.

In a review of Onward to War in the Globe & Mail in October 2001, the historian Modris Eksteins wrote:

"'Canada's historian', as his publishers are describing him in recent advertising, takes us with his usual narrative verve across sundry battlefields, of South Africa, northern Europe and Korea, but also Ottawa and other venues of our domestic political strife....is this kind of judgmental narrative what history should be in the 21st century? If the world changed in the last century as dramatically as Berton insists, can - or should - history be written in much the same way Carlyle and Macaulay presented it over a century ago? ...That vision of the past as an interconnected whole has shattered over the century about which Berton writes, as if hit by a mammoth artillery shell, but there's no sign of this in his account."

In 2004, Berton published his 50th book, Prisoners of the North, after which he announced in an interview with CanWest News Service that he was retiring from writing.

== Marriage, children and relationships ==
During his time in Britain, he dated a woman named Frances who informed him on VE Day that she was pregnant with his child and did not want him involved, as told by Berton in his autobiography and retold in his biography. Berton never knew his British child.

Berton married Janet Walker in 1946. They had eight children.

By the early 1960s, Berton's company, Pierre Berton Enterprises, was making an annual income of $37,000 at a time when the typical Canadian had an annual income of $5,187, making him and his family comfortably upper middle-class.

In the 1960s, Berton was a leading member of the Sordsmen's Club [sic], a group of Toronto intellectuals and businessmen who met for expensive lunches with women who were not their wives, and who were forbidden to attend its meetings unless their husband was not present.

Other members included Jack McCllelland, John C. Parkin, Harold Town, George Fryer, Chuck Rathgreb, Arthur Hailey, and Ralph McCreath. Women who attended the lunches included the columnist Nancy Philips; the journalist Adrienne Clarkson; the singer Dinah Carroll; the journalist Barbara Moon; Joan Taylor, the wife of a sports journalist; the broadcaster Joan McCormack; and the art gallery owner Dorothy Cameron.

About the club, Philips said in 1986: "We had an idea that we shouldn't go home alone, let's put it that way". A later controversy developed when it emerged that at end of the lunches, which typically occurred on a Friday afternoon and lasted five hours, each man stood behind a woman of his choosing with whom he expected to have sex.

The Sordsmen's Club attracted unwanted publicity when Toronto Telegram journalist McKenzie Porter, who had previously worked with Berton at Maclean's, exposed the group. Porter arrived at one of its Friday luncheons at Toronto's Franz Josef Room accompanied by a photographer, prompting members to flee through a back exit to avoid being photographed. Porter subsequently wrote about the incident and published the luncheon menu, briefly making the club the subject of public gossip.

Berton and the club's inner circle, including June Callwood, Farley Mowat, Charles Templeton, Lister Sinclair, Elsa Franklin and Fred Davis, responded by refusing to discuss the club publicly while privately ridiculing Porter, whom Berton later described as "an oddball Englishman ... the master of the low-profile character sketch ... a self-declared snob".

He was survived by his wife and their eight children, along with 14 grandchildren.

== Later life and death ==
Berton attracted attention in October 2004 by discussing his 40 years of recreational use of marijuana on two CBC Television programs, Play and Rick Mercer Report. On the latter show he gave a "celebrity tip" on how to roll a joint.

Berton died at Sunnybrook Hospital in Toronto, of heart failure, at the age of 84 on November 30, 2004. His cremated remains were scattered at his home in Kleinburg. Berton was an atheist.

== Legacy ==
Before the 1960s, the major divisions in English-Canadian society were between continentalism (i.e., moving Canada closer to the United States), associated with the Liberal Party, and imperialism (which in a Canadian context meant closer ties with Great Britain), associated with the Conservative party. The 1960s saw the emergence of the "new nationalism" that rejected both continentalism and imperialism as options. Berton became one of the principle spokesmen for this new nationalism, as he argued that Canada could stand alone as a great nation.

Established in 1994, the Pierre Berton Award is presented annually by Canada's National History Society for distinguished achievement in presenting Canadian history in an informative and engaging manner. Berton was the first recipient and agreed to lend his name to future awards.

His childhood home in Dawson City, Yukon, now called Berton House, is currently used as a retreat for professional Canadian writers. Established authors apply for a three-month-long subsidized residency, adding to the area's literary community with events such as local public readings. Previously, the Berton House Writers' Retreat was administered by the Berton House Writers' Retreat Society and Elsa Franklin, Pierre Berton's long-time editor and agent. In October 2007, the deed to Berton House was passed to the Writers' Trust of Canada; the literary organization now oversees the program as part of its roster of literary support.

On October 17, 2004, the CA$12.6-million Pierre Berton Resource Library, named in his honour, was opened in Vaughan, Ontario.

Berton came to be Canada's best-known intellectual. His biographer, Brian McKillop wrote:

"No one in Canada or for that matter in North America, managed to take hold of the full range of the mainstream media with the same kind of commanding presence and authority. One searches in vain for an American or British equivalent. It is if he somehow carried the DNA of Edward R. Murrow and Jack Paar, Vance Packard and Michael Harrington, Bernard DeVoto and Studs Terkel, with more than a little Garrison Keillor in the mix. Each of these figures—a war correspondent who spoke truth to power; a host of the most watched and enduring television interview program of its era; a muckraking journalist in the age of the consumer; a left-wing critic of North American society; a popular and respected historian of nation and empire in North America; a collector of the kind of folklore that serves as the first draft of history; a folksy, story-telling humorist of nostalgic bent—was or is a man of exceptional accomplishment in his own area. The magnitude of Berton's achievement was that he spanned them all and become more than their sum".

== Awards and honours ==
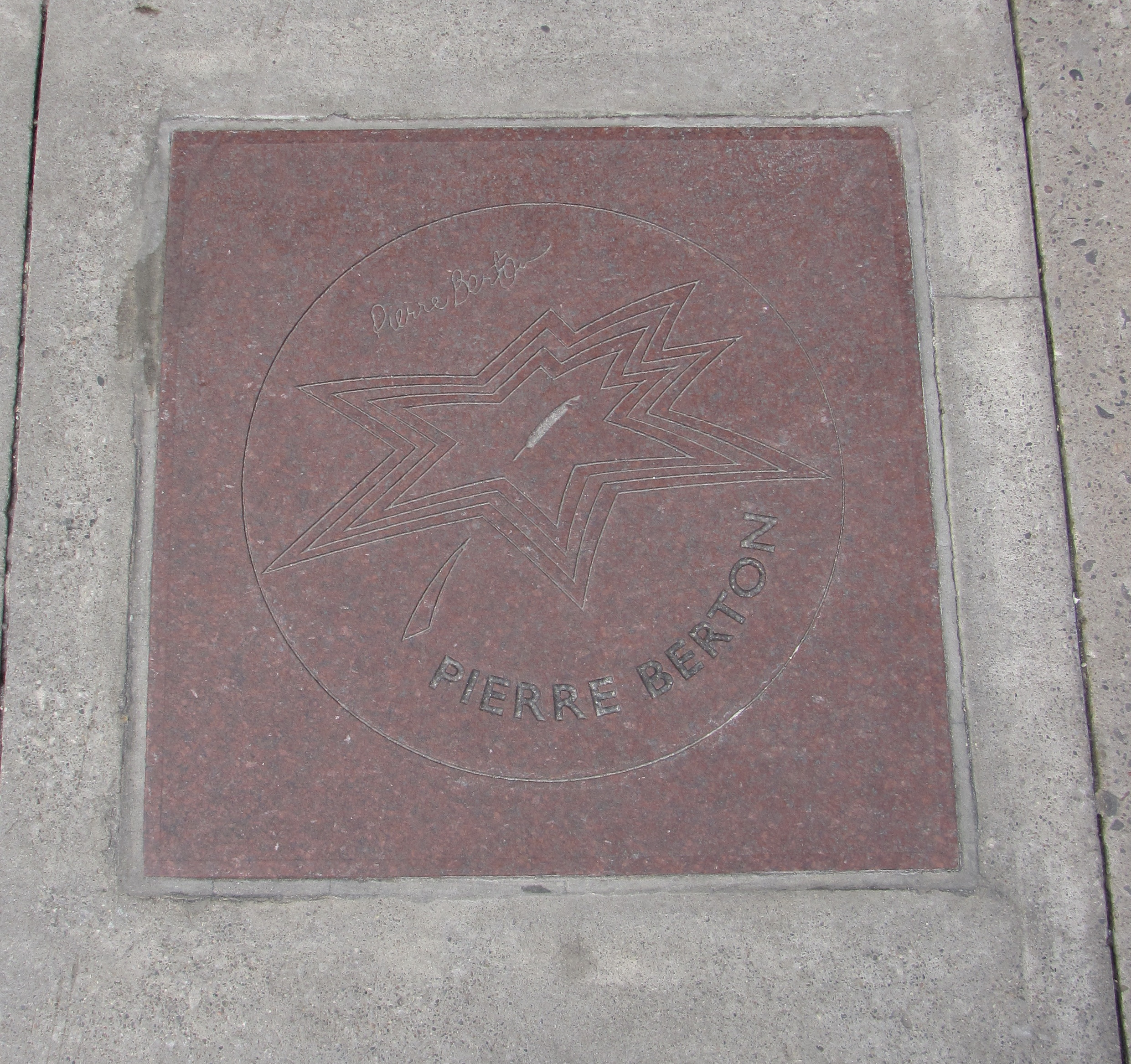
Pierre Berton's Star on Canada's Walk of Fame

=== Literary and history awards ===
- 1956: Governor General's Award for English-language non-fiction for The Mysterious North.
- 1958: Governor General's Award for English-language non-fiction for Klondike.
- 1960: Stephen Leacock Memorial Medal for Humour for Just Add Water and Stir.
- 1971: Governor General's Award for English-language non-fiction for The Last Spike.
- 1981: Canadian Authors Association Literary Award for non-fiction.
- 1982: Canadian Booksellers Award.
- 1994: First recipient of the Pierre Berton Award from Canada's National History Society.

=== Journalism and broadcasting awards ===
- 1978: Nellie Award for best public affairs broadcaster in radio.
- 1996: Responsibility in Journalism Award from the Committee for the Scientific Investigation of Claims of the Paranormal (CSICOP).
- John Drainie Award.
- National Newspaper Award.

=== Orders and commemorative medals ===
- 1974: Appointed an Officer of the Order of Canada.
- 1977: Queen Elizabeth II Silver Jubilee Medal.
- 1986: Promoted to Companion of the Order of Canada.
- 1992: Appointed a member of the Order of Ontario.
- 1992: 125th Anniversary of the Confederation of Canada Medal.
- 2002: Queen Elizabeth II Golden Jubilee Medal.

=== Other honours ===
- 1989: Gabrielle Léger Medal for Lifetime Achievement in Heritage Conservation.
- 1998: Inducted into Canada's Walk of Fame.
- 2003: named Toronto Humanist of the Year 2003 by the Humanist Association of Toronto.
- Voted No. 31 in the list of great Canadians in The Greatest Canadian project.

=== Honorary degrees ===
- 1973: University of Prince Edward Island, honorary degree.
- 1974: York University, Doctor of Letters.
- 1978: Dalhousie University, Doctor of Laws.
- 1981: Brock University, Doctor of Laws.
- 1981: University of Windsor, Doctor of Letters.
- 1982: Athabasca University, Doctor of Athabasca University.
- 1983: University of Victoria, Doctor of Laws.
- 1983: McMaster University, Doctor of Letters.
- 1984: Royal Military College of Canada, Doctor of Laws.
- 1984: University of Alaska Fairbanks, honorary degree.
- 1985: University of British Columbia, Doctor of Letters.
- 1988: University of Waterloo, Doctor of Laws.
- 2002: University of Western Ontario, Doctor of Laws.

== Bibliography ==
=== Year of publication and title ===
1. 1953 The Royal Family
2. 1954 The Golden Trail: The Story of the Klondike Rush (Young Reader)
3. 1956 The Mysterious North: Encounters with the Canadian Frontier, 1947–1954
4. 1958 The Klondike Fever: The Life and Death of the Last Great Gold Rush
5. 1959 Just Add Water and Stir
6. 1960 Adventures of a Columnist
7. 1961 The Secret World of Og (Young Reader)
8. 1961 The New City : a prejudiced view of Toronto (Picture Book)
9. 1962 Fast, Fast, Fast Relief
10. 1963 The Big Sell
11. 1965 My War with the Twentieth Century (Anthology)
12. 1965 The Comfortable Pew
13. 1965 Remember Yesterday (Picture Book)
14. 1966 Pierre & Janet Berton's Canadian Food Guide (Anthology)
15. 1966 The Cool, Crazy, Committed World of the Sixties
16. 1968 The Smug Minority
17. 1970 The National Dream: The Great Railway, 1871–1881
18. 1971 The Last Spike: The Great Railway, 1881–1885
19. 1972 Klondike: The Last Great Gold Rush, 1896–1899 (Revised and information added to 1958 Edition)
20. 1972 The Great Railway: The Building of the Canadian Pacific Illustrated (Picture Book)
21. 1973 Drifting Home
22. 1975 Hollywood's Canada: The Americanization of the National Image
23. 1976 My Country: The Remarkable Past
24. 1977 The Dionne Years: A Thirties Melodrama
25. 1978 The Wild Frontier: more tales from the remarkable past
26. 1980 The Invasion of Canada: 1812–1813
27. 1981 Flames Across the Border: 1813–1814
28. 1982 Why We Act Like Canadians: A Personal Exploration of Our National Character
29. 1983 The Klondike Quest (Picture Book)
30. 1984 The Promised Land: Settling the West 1896–1914
31. 1985 Masquerade (as "Lisa Kroniuk") (Fiction)
32. 1986 Vimy
33. 1987 Starting Out: 1920–1947
34. 1988 The Arctic Grail: The Quest for the North West Passage and the North Pole, 1818–1909
35. 1990 The Great Depression: 1929–1939
36. 1992 Niagara: A History of the Falls
37. 1993 Niagara: Picture Book (Picture Book)
38. 1994 Winter (Picture Book)
39. 1995 My Times: Living With History, 1947–1995
40. 1996 Farewell to the Twentieth Century (Anthology)
41. 1996 The Great Lakes (Picture Book)
42. 1997 1967: The Last Good Year
43. 1998 Worth Repeating: A Literary Resurrection (Anthology)
44. 1999 Seacoasts (Picture Book)
45. 1999 Welcome To The 21st Century: More Absurdities From Our Time (Anthology)
46. 1999 Pierre Berton's Canada: The Land and the People (Picture Book)
47. 2001 Marching as to War: Canada's Turbulent Years
48. 2002 Cats I Have Known and Loved
49. 2003 The Joy of Writing: A Guide for Writers Disguised as a Literary Memoir
50. 2004 Prisoners of the North

=== History for Young Canadians ===
==== The Battles of the War of 1812 ====
1. 1991 The Capture of Detroit
2. 1991 The Death of Isaac Brock
3. 1991 Revenge of the Tribes
4. 1991 Canada Under Siege
5. 1994 The Battle of Lake Erie
6. 1994 The Death of Tecumseh
7. 1995 Attack on Montreal

==== Exploring the Frozen North ====
1. 1992 Parry of the Arctic
2. 1992 Jane Franklin's Obsession
3. 1993 Dr. Kane of the Arctic Seas
4. 1993 Trapped in the Arctic

==== Canada Moves West ====
1. 1992 The Railway Pathfinders
2. 1992 The Men in Sheepskin Coats
3. 1992 A Prairie Nightmare
4. 1992 Steel Across the Plains
5. 1994 Steel Across the Shield

==== The Great Klondike Gold Rush ====
1. 1991 Bonanza Gold
2. 1991 The Klondike Stampede
3. 1992 Trails of '98, City of Gold
4. 1992 City of Gold
5. 1993 Kings of the Klondike
6. 1993 Before the Gold Rush

There is also Berton's abridged version of "The National Dream" and "The Last Spike" that was published in 1974 and a compendium of the two books "The Invasion of Canada" and "Flames Across the Border" entitled the "War of 1812" published in 1980,

A comprehensive biography of Pierre Berton was written by A. B. McKillop. It was published in 2008, four years after Berton's death aged 84.

All of Pierre Berton's writings, including finished books and articles as well as manuscripts, drafts, and research material are now held in the Pierre Berton fonds at the McMaster University Archives.

== Sources ==
- Auger, Michel; Edwards, Peter (2012). The Encyclopedia of Canadian Organized Crime: From Captain Kidd to Mom Boucher. Toronto: McClelland & Stewart. ISBN 978-0-7710-3049-9.
- Hidy, Ralph W (Summer 1973). "Review of The Impossible Railroad (The American title of The Last Spike)". The Business History Review. 47 (2): 284–285. doi:10.2307/3113409. JSTOR 3113409. S2CID 155329804.
- Langton, Jerry (2010). Showdown: How the Outlaws, Hells Angels and Cops Fought for Control of the Streets. Toronto: John Wiley. ISBN 978-0-470-67878-7.
- McKillop, Brian (2011). Pierre Berton A Biography. Toronto: McClelland & Stewart. ISBN 978-1-55199-622-6.
