= List of Canadian films of 1988 =

This is a list of Canadian films which were released in 1988:

Title	Director	Cast	Genre	Notes
Alias Will James	Jacques Godbout	Will James	National Film Board documentary	Music by Robert M. Lepage & Ian Tyson
American Gothic	John Hough		Horror	
Apprentice to Murder	Ralph L. Thomas		Thriller	
Backfire	Gilbert Cates		Thriller	
The Box of Sun (La boite à soleil)	Jean Pierre Lefebvre		Drama	
The Brain	Ed Hunt	Cyndy Preston, George Buza	Horror	
Bruce and Pepper Wayne Gacy's Home Movies	Bruce LaBruce		Short	
Calling the Shots	Holly Dale & Janis Cole	Includes Agnès Varda, Amy Heckling, Martha Coolidge, Jeanne Moreau	Documentary	
Candy Mountain	Robert Frank	Kevin J. O'Connor, Tom Waits, Bulle Ogier	Drama	Canada-France-Switzerland co-production
The Carpenter	David Wellington	Wings Hauser	Slasher film	
The Cat Came Back	Cordell Barker		National Film Board animated short	Genie Award – Animated Short; Academy Award nominee – Animated Short
Clair Obscur	Bashar Shbib		Drama	
Comic Book Confidential	Ron Mann	with Jack Kirby, Will Eisner, Robert Crumb	Documentary	Script by Ron Mann & bp Nichol; Genie Award - Feature documentary
Cowboys Don't Cry	Anne Wheeler	Ron White, Zachary Ansley, Janet-Laine Green, Rebecca Jenkins	Drama	Genie Award - Song
Dead Ringers	David Cronenberg	Jeremy Irons, Geneviève Bujold, Shirley Douglas, Stephen Lack, Heidi Von Palleske	Drama	Made with U.S. financing
Finding Mary March	Ken Pittman	Rick Boland, Jacinta Cormier	Historical drama	
Gaspard and Son (Gaspard et fil$)	François Labonté	Jacques Godin, Gaston Lepage, Monique Miller	Comedy	
Glory Enough for All	Eric Till		Historical drama	
God Bless the Child	Larry Elikann		Drama	
Growing Up in America	Morley Markson		Documentary	
The Heat Line (La ligne de chaleur)	Hubert-Yves Rose	Gabriel Arcand, Gerard Parkes	Drama	
Inside/Out	Lori Spring	Emma Richler, Jackie Burroughs	Short drama	
Into the Fire	Graeme Campbell	Susan Anspach, Art Hindle	Thriller	
Iron Eagle II	Sidney J. Furie	Louis Gossett Jr., Mark Humphrey, Stuart Margolin, Alan Scarfe, Maury Chaykin, Colm Feore	Action adventure	Canada-Israel co-production
Kalamazoo	André Forcier	Rémy Girard, Marie Tifo, Tony Nardi	Drama	
The Kiss	Pen Densham	Joanna Pacula, Meredith Salenger, Mimi Kuzyk	Horror	Made with U.S. financing
Malarek	Roger Cardinal	Elias Koteas, Kerrie Keane, Al Waxman, Daniel Pilon	Drama	
Martha, Ruth and Edie	Norma Bailey, Deepa Mehta, Danièle J. Suissa	Jennifer Dale, Andrea Martin, Lois Maxwell, Margaret Langrick	Drama	
Milk and Honey	Glen Salzman & Rebecca Yates	Josette Simon, Lyman Ward, Fiona Reid, Tom Butler	Drama	Genie Award – Screenplay; Canada-U.K. co-production
The Mills of Power (Les Tisserands du pouvoir)	Claude Fournier		Historical drama	Two-part film which received brief theatrical distribution before airing as a television miniseries in 1989 (French) and 1990 (English)
The Mysterious Moon Men of Canada	Colin Brunton	Gerry Quigley	Short	Genie Award – Live-Action Short
Office Party	George Mihalka	David Warner, Michael Ironside, Kate Vernon, Jayne Eastwood	Thriller	
The Outside Chance of Maximilian Glick	Allan Goldstein	Noam Zylberman, Saul Rubinek, Jan Rubeš, Fairuza Balk, Aaron Schwartz, Susan Rubeš	Coming-of-age drama	Toronto Festival of Festivals – Best Canadian Feature
Palais Royale	Martin Lavut	Kim Cattrall, Matt Craven, Kim Coates, Dean Stockwell	Crime drama	
Pin	Sandor Stern	David Hewlett, Cyndy Preston, John Pyper-Ferguson	Horror	
Pissoir	John Greyson	Paul Bettis, Pauline Carey	Experimental gay feature	Berlin Film Festival – Teddy Award
The Revolving Doors (Les Portes tournantes)	Francis Mankiewicz	Monique Spaziani, Gabriel Arcand, Miou-Miou, François Méthé, Rémy Girard	Drama	Canada-France co-production
A Rustling of Leaves: Inside the Philippine Revolution	Nettie Wild		Documentary	
Shadow Dancing	Lewis Furey	Nadine van der Velde, Christopher Plummer, James Kee, John Colicos	Gothic mystery/dance	
Something About Love	Tom Berry	Stefan Wodoslawsky, Jan Rubeš, Jennifer Dale, Ron James	Drama	
The Squamish Five	Paul Donovan	Nicky Guadagni, Michael McManus, Robyn Stevan, Albert Schultz	Docudrama	
Straight for the Heart (À corps perdu)	Léa Pool	Matthias Habich, Johanne-Marie Tremblay, Michel Voïta, Jean-François Pichette	Drama	Canada-Switzerland co-production
The Tadpole and the Whale (La grenouille et la baleine)	Jean-Claude Lord	Fanny Lauzier, Denis Forest, Marina Orsini, Félix-Antoine Leroux, Jean Lajeunesse	Children's film	From the Tales for All series; Golden Reel Award
Tales from the Gimli Hospital	Guy Maddin	Kyle McCulloch	Drama	Guy Maddin's first feature
Tenderfoot (Le Pied tendre)	Roger Boire	Massimo Agostinelli, Mario Bertrand, Andréa Davidson	Short drama/dance	
Tommy Tricker and the Stamp Traveller	Michael Rubbo	Lucas Evans, Anthony Rogers	Children's film	From the Tales for All series
The Understudy: Graveyard Shift II	Jerry Ciccoritti		Horror	Direct to video
Watchers	Jon Hess	Corey Haim, Michael Ironside, Barbara Williams, Lala Sloatman	Horror	
Witnesses: The Untold War in Afghanistan	Martyn Burke		Documentary	
The World Is Watching	Peter Raymont	Peter Jennings, Ted Koppel	Documentary	Genie Award - Short documentary
You're Beautiful, Jeanne (T'es belle, Jeanne)	Robert Ménard	Marie Tifo, Michel Côté, Pierre Curzi	Drama	

== See also ==
- 1988 in Canada
- 1988 in Canadian television
