= Kay Sumner =

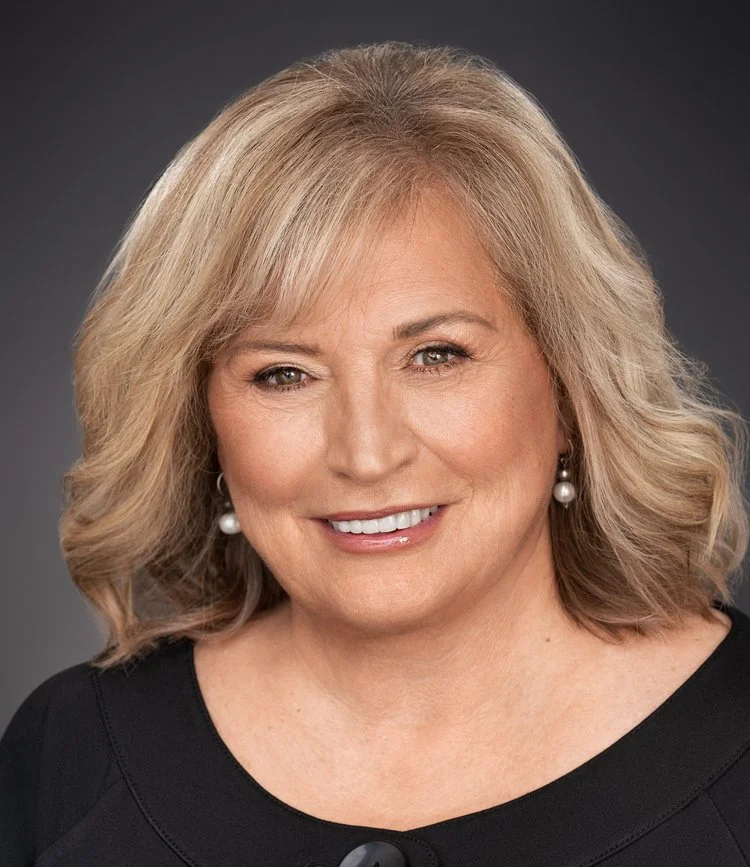
Kay Bachman Sumner

Kay Bachman Sumner is a Los Angeles based television and film producer who was best known as the producer and co-creator for the television series Dog Whisperer with Cesar Millan, which built a library of more than 170 episodes and spanning nine seasons. The series received Emmy Award nominations in 2006, 2007, and 2009 for Outstanding Reality Program, won the People’s Choice Award in 2010 for Best Animal Show and Best Variety or Reality Show, and won Best Variety or Reality Show at the 2008 Imagen Awards. She continues to own and serve as Partner to Dog Whisperer Productions, which manages the entire library, to this day.

Her 1988 film, Shadow Dancing, received several Genie Award nominations, including for cinematography, costume design, and original song, and won a CSC Award for Best Cinematography in a Theatrical Feature.

Earlier in her career, Sumner was creator and producer for Eye Bet for WXYZ-TV in Detroit which played on ABC's O&O stations. Subsequently, she created a Canadian version of Eye Bet for CFTO Studios for the CTV Network. She created and produced of Any Woman Can Fix It, a home improvement television series for women that ran for sixty-five episodes on CBC (Canada) and was syndicated for eleven years. In addition, she also worked as staff producer for ABC O&O's, Morning Show and The Anniversary Game for WXYZ-TV, and the Chicago Show for WLS-TV.

Sumner was invited by Executive Producer Jeff Cowan to produce The New Quiz Kids with Norman Lear for CBS Cable, which was nominated for an Ace Award for Best Children’s Show. She previously produced The New Quiz Kids with RKO, as well as producing The New Quiz Kids in Toronto on the Global Network.

She served as Vice Chair of Activities for the Television Academy from 2003 to 2005, and in 2005 was honored by the Academy for her contributions to The Art of the Deal: How to Negotiate. Additionally, she was involved in the Reality TV peer group from 2000 to 2010 and is currently an active member.

In 2018, Kay Sumner with her husband, Murray Sumner, established their non-profit, Not One More Time, Inc. for the purposes of creating, packaging, and disseminating film, print and media educational content on addiction awareness. Their first project was her directorial debut, a critically acclaimed 54 min. documentary film entitled SURVIVORS: UNTOLD STORIES IN AMERICA'S OPIOID CRISIS, detailing real stories of opioid recoveries and losses which has won multiple best feature documentary awards.

== Partial filmography ==
Year	Title	Role	Notes
2023	SURVIVORS: UNTOLD STORIES IN AMERICA'S OPIOID CRISIS	Producer, Director and Creator	
2010	Dreams	Executive Producer	
2004	Dog Whisperer with Cesar Millan	Producer and Co-Creator	174 Episodes
1988	Shadow Dancing	Producer	
1978	The New Quiz Kids	Producer	
1974	Any Woman Can Fix It	Producer and Creator	65 Episodes
1971	Eye Bet	Producer and Creator	

== Recognition ==
=== Awards and nominations ===
Her 1988 film Shadow Dancing won a CSC Award from the CSC in 1989 for 'Best Cinematography in Theatrical Feature', as well as receiving Genie Award nominations for 'Best Achievement in Cinematography', 'Best Achievement in Costume Design', and 'Best Original Song'. Her produced series The Dog Whisperer, received Emmy Award nominations in 2006, 2007, and 2009 for 'Outstanding Reality Program'. The Dog Whisperer also won the People's Choice Award in 2010 for 'Best Animal Show' and 'Best Variety or Reality Show' at the 2008's Imagine Awards.

Her 2021 documentary, Survivors, won the Accolade Global Film: Best Christian Film Documentary, Award of Excellence: Best Women Filmmakers, Christian Film Festival: Best Film Documentary, ETHOS Film Awards: Best Documentary Film- Short or Feature, Europe Independent Movie Festival: Best Film Documentary Feature Film, Festival Napoleon on Champs Elysses in Paris: Best Film Documentary, Milan Gold Awards: Best Original Song, Milan Gold Awards: Best Documentary Feature, Silver Award: Best Original Song from International Gold Awards, Silver Award: Best Feature Documentary from International Gold Awards.

As well as being selected for CA Women's Film Festival: Documentary Feature, Florence Film Awards: Feature Documentary, London Movie Awards: Feature Documentary, and the Zion International Film Festival: Feature Narrative.
