= Alex Tilley =

Alex Tilley may refer to:

- Alexandra Tilley (born 1993), Scottish alpine ski racer
- Alexander Tilley, founder of Tilley Endurables hatmakers
