= 1988 in Canada =

- Decades: 1960s; 1970s; 1980s; 1990s; 2000s
- See also: History of Canada; Timeline of Canadian history; List of years in Canada

Events from the year 1988 in Canada.

== Incumbents ==
=== Crown ===
- Monarch – Elizabeth II

=== Federal government ===
- Governor General – Jeanne Sauvé
- Prime Minister – Brian Mulroney
- Chief Justice – Brian Dickson (Manitoba)
- Parliament – 33rd (until 1 October) then 34th (from December 12)

=== Provincial governments ===
==== Lieutenant governors ====
- Lieutenant Governor of Alberta – Helen Hunley
- Lieutenant Governor of British Columbia – Robert G. Rogers (until September 9) then David Lam
- Lieutenant Governor of Manitoba – George Johnson
- Lieutenant Governor of New Brunswick – Gilbert Finn
- Lieutenant Governor of Newfoundland – James McGrath
- Lieutenant Governor of Nova Scotia – Alan Abraham
- Lieutenant Governor of Ontario – Lincoln Alexander
- Lieutenant Governor of Prince Edward Island – Lloyd MacPhail
- Lieutenant Governor of Quebec – Gilles Lamontagne
- Lieutenant Governor of Saskatchewan – Frederick Johnson (until September 7) then Sylvia Fedoruk

==== Premiers ====
- Premier of Alberta – Don Getty
- Premier of British Columbia – Bill Vander Zalm
- Premier of Manitoba – Howard Pawley (until May 9) then Gary Filmon
- Premier of New Brunswick – Frank McKenna
- Premier of Newfoundland – Brian Peckford
- Premier of Nova Scotia – John Buchanan
- Premier of Ontario – David Peterson
- Premier of Prince Edward Island – Joe Ghiz
- Premier of Quebec – Robert Bourassa
- Premier of Saskatchewan – Grant Devine

=== Territorial governments ===
==== Commissioners ====
- Commissioner of Yukon – John Kenneth McKinnon
- Commissioner of Northwest Territories – John Havelock Parker

==== Premiers ====
- Premier of the Northwest Territories – Dennis Patterson
- Premier of Yukon – Tony Penikett

== Events ==
- January 28 – Canada's abortion laws are repealed by the Supreme Court.
- March 19 – Jacques Parizeau becomes leader of the Parti Québécois.
- May – HMCS Halifax, the first Halifax-class frigate, is launched in Saint John, New Brunswick.
- May 9 – Gary Filmon becomes premier of Manitoba, replacing Howard Pawley.
- June 4 – The Canadian Heraldic Authority is established, with a mandate to grant armorial bearings to worthy Canadians and Canadian corporations. It is the first heraldic authority in the Commonwealth of Nations outside the United Kingdom.
- July 21 – The War Measures Act is replaced by the Emergencies Act.
- September 1 – Several new cable channels sign-on: YTV, VisionTV, Family, WeatherNow, MétéoMédia, TV5 Québec Canada.
- September 1 – All rail service is terminated in Newfoundland after CN Rail abandons its rail lines on the island operated by its Terra Transport subsidiary.
- September 22 – Prime Minister Brian Mulroney officially apologizes for the World War II internment of Japanese Canadians.
- November 1 – The Canadian Centre on Substance Abuse is created.
- November 21 – In the federal election, Brian Mulroney's Progressive Conservative Party wins a second majority government in an election fought over the Canada-US Free Trade Agreement.
- December 15 – The Supreme Court rules that Quebec's Charter of the French Language is unconstitutional.
- December 21 – The Quebec Legislature reinstates the language laws using the notwithstanding clause.

=== Full date unknown ===
- Svend Robinson becomes Canada's first Member of Parliament to come out as homosexual.
- Maher Arar emigrates to Canada.
- David Lam becomes Lieutenant-Governor of British Columbia.
- CHUM Limited buys the CHUM-City Building at the corner of Queen and John streets in Toronto as their headquarters.
- Conrad Black gains control of The Spectator.

== Arts and literature ==
- May 21 – The new National Gallery of Canada building opens in Ottawa.

=== New works ===
- Timothy Findley – Stones
- Morley Callaghan – A Wild Old Man on the Road
- Jeffrey Simpson – Spoils of Power
- bill bissett – What We Have

=== Awards ===
- See 1988 Governor General's Awards for a complete list of winners and finalists for those awards.
- Books in Canada First Novel Award: Marion Quednau, The Butterfly Chair
- Geoffrey Bilson Award: 1988 – Carol Matas, 'Lisa
- Gerald Lampert Award: Di Brandt, Questions I Asked My Mother
- Marian Engel Award: Edna Alford
- Pat Lowther Award: Gwendolyn MacEwen, Afterworlds
- Stephen Leacock Award: Paul Quarrington, King Leary
- Trillium Book Award: Timothy Findley, Stones
- Vicky Metcalf Award: Barbara Smucker

== Sport ==
- February 13–February 28 – The XV Olympic Winter Games are held in Calgary.
- May 14 – The Medicine Hat Tigers win their second (consecutive) Memorial Cup by defeating the Windsor Spitfires 7 to 6. The final game was played at Centre Georges-Vézina in Chicoutimi, Quebec
- May 26 – The Edmonton Oilers win their fourth (second consecutive) Stanley Cup by defeating the Boston Bruins 4 games to 0. Brantford, Ontario's Wayne Gretzky was awarded his second Conn Smythe Trophy
- July – The 1988 World Junior Championships in Athletics take place in Sudbury, Ontario.
- August 9 – Wayne Gretzky is traded to the Los Angeles Kings by the Edmonton Oilers with Mike Krushelnyski and Marty McSorley for Jimmy Carson, Martin Gélinas, US$15 million and the Kings' first-round draft picks in 1989 (later acquired by New Jersey Devils, who selected Jason Miller), 1991 (Martin Ručinský), and 1993 (Nick Stajduhar)
- September 26 – Sprinter Ben Johnson is stripped of his Olympic gold medal and world record when he tests positive for steroids.
- Figure skater Kurt Browning completes the first-ever quadruple toe loop in competition.
- November 19 – The Calgary Dinos win their third Vanier Cup by defeating the Saint Mary's Huskies by a score of 52–23 in the 24th Vanier Cup
- November 27 – The Winnipeg Blue Bombers win their ninth Grey Cup by defeating the BC Lions in the 76th Grey Cup played at Lansdowne Park in Ottawa. Ancaster, Ontario's Bob Cameron was awarded the game's Most Valuable Canadian

== Births ==
- January 6 – Andrew Robinson, water polo player
- January 12 - Claude Giroux, ice hockey player
- January 19 – Tyler Breeze, pro wrestler
- February 14 – Katie Boland, actress, writer, and producer
- February 20 – Tracy Spiridakos, actress
- February 22 - Marieve Heringgton, voice actor
- February 27 – Dustin Jeffrey, ice hockey player
- March 15 – James Reimer, ice hockey goaltender
- March 16 – Jessica Gregg, speed skater
- April 21 – Robbie Amell, actor
- April 22 - Deven Mack, voice actor
- April 29 – Jonathan Toews, hockey player
- May 3 – Kaya Turski, freestyle skier
- May 5 – Skye Sweetnam, singer-songwriter and actress
- May 9 –
  - J. R. Fitzpatrick, race car driver
- May 11 - Brad Marchand, ice hockey player
- May 16 – Amanda Asay, baseball and ice hockey player (died 2022)
- May 18 – Ryan Cooley, actor
- May 26 – Kelly MacDonald, diver
- June 6 – Keshia Chanté, singer-songwriter, model, actress, and philanthropist
- June 7 –
  - Michael Cera, actor
  - Milan Lucic, ice hockey player
- June 12 – Dakota Morton, actor and radio host
- June 16 – Keshia Chanté, singer-songwriter, model and actress
- June 18 – Yannick Riendeau, ice hockey player
- July 2 – Seanna Mitchell, swimmer
- July 6 – Mathieu Bois, swimmer
- July 12 – Melissa O'Neil, singer
- July 25 – Heather Marks, model
- July 29 – Emily Csikos, water polo player
- August 4 –
  - Carly Foulkes, model and actress
  - David A. Kaye, voice actress and producer
- August 8 –
  - Jake Goldsbie, actor
  - Zoe Slusar, voice actor
- August 16 – Tara Teng, model, activist, and television presenter
- August 23 - Alice Glass, singer
- August 28 - Rosie MacLennan, trampoline gymnast
- September 10 –
  - Jordan Staal, hockey player
  - Coco Rocha, model
- September 23 - Shannon Chan-Kent, voice and stage actress
- September 24 – Kirsten Sweetland, triathlete
- September 26 – Lilly Singh, YouTuber, comedian and TV host
- October 17 – Cristine Rotenberg, crime statistics analyst and YouTube personality
- October 7 – Yvonne Chapman, actress and model
- October 21 – Mark Rendall, actor
- November 3 – Jessie Loutit, rower
- November 8 – Jessica Lowndes, actress and singer-songwriter
- November 16 – Kier Maitland, swimmer
- November 21 – Len Väljas, cross-country skier
- November 22 – Reece Thompson, actor
- December 16 – Gael Mackie, artistic gymnast

=== Full date unknown ===
- Anastasia De Sousa, student (died 2006)

== Deaths ==
=== January to June ===
- February 2 – Louis-Marie Régis, philosopher, theologian, scholar and member of the Dominican Order (born 1903)
- March 20 – Gil Evans, jazz pianist, arranger, composer and bandleader (born 1912)
- June 19 – Fernand Seguin, biochemist, professor and television host (born 1922)

=== July to December ===
- July 4
  - Donald MacLaren, World War I flying ace, businessman (born 1893)
  - Dave McKigney, professional wrestler (born 1932)
- July 9 – Richard Spink Bowles, lawyer and Lieutenant Governor of Manitoba (born 1912)
- August 8 – Félix Leclerc, folk singer, poet, writer, actor and political activist (born 1914)
- August 28 – Jean Marchand, trade unionist and politician (born 1918)
- September 6 – Frederic McGrand, physician and politician (born 1895)
- September 8 – Joseph Algernon Pearce, astrophysicist (born 1893)
- September 25 – bpNichol, poet (born 1944)
- September 27 – George Grant, philosopher, teacher and political commentator (born 1918)
- October 15 – Victor Copps, politician and Mayor of Hamilton (born 1919)
- October 31 – Alfred Pellan, painter (born 1906)
- November 26 – John Dahmer, politician (born 1937)
- December 20 — Alphonse Ouimet, president of CBC from 1958 to 1968 (born 1908)

== See also ==
- 1988 in Canadian television
- List of Canadian films of 1988
