= 10th Genie Awards =

Awards for 1988 Canadian films

- Date: March 22, 1989
- Site: Westin Harbour Castle Hotel; Toronto, Ontario
- Hosted by: Dave Thomas

Highlights
- Best Picture: Dead Ringers
- Most awards: Dead Ringers
- Most nominations: Dead Ringers

Television coverage
- Network: CBC Television

The 10th Genie Awards were held on March 22, 1989 to honour achievements of Canadian films which were released in 1988. The event was held at the Westin Harbour Castle Hotel in Toronto and was hosted by actor Dave Thomas.

The event was one of the most challenging in the history of the event. The venue had to be changed due to a scheduling conflict and, seven days before the show, CBC members of the Canadian Union of Public Employees (CUPE) went on strike. This meant that the production lost access to staging and set elements, which were built by, and stored at, the CBC. The Genies also lost 100 CUPE production staff and crew. While the CBC was still able to air the event, to allow it to proceed, the network cancelled its co-production contract, and the academy received emergency funding from Telefilm Canada, the Ontario Film Development Corporation and the federal Department of Communication. New sets were completed and, with a leaner crew, the ceremony was ready to proceed when, 45 minutes before air, a bomb threat was received. The hotel was swarmed by police, who found no bomb, and the event was able to take place.

For this year, a record 35 features and 38 short films and documentaries were entered. The awards were dominated by David Cronenberg's Dead Ringers, which won ten awards.

== Winners and nominees ==
Motion Picture	Direction
Dead Ringers — David Cronenberg, Marc Boyman; The Outside Chance of Maximilian Glick — Stephen Foster; The Revolving Doors (Les Portes tournantes) — Francyne Morin and René Malo; Straight for the Heart (À corps perdu) — Robin Spry, Denise Robert; A Winter Tan — Aerlyn Weissman, John Frizzell, Louise Clark, Jackie Burroughs, John Walker	David Cronenberg, Dead Ringers; Roger Cardinal, Malarek; Louise Clark, Jackie Burroughs, John Walker, Aerlyn Weissman, and John Frizzell, A Winter Tan; Francis Mankiewicz, The Revolving Doors (Les Portes tournantes); Anne Wheeler, Cowboys Don't Cry
Actor in a leading role	Actress in a leading role
Jeremy Irons, Dead Ringers; Zachary Ansley, Cowboys Don't Cry; Elias Koteas, Malarek; Saul Rubinek, The Outside Chance of Maximilian Glick; Jan Rubeš, Something About Love; Ron White, Cowboys Don't Cry	Jackie Burroughs, A Winter Tan; Geneviève Bujold, Dead Ringers; Kerrie Keane, Hitting Home; Josette Simon, Milk and Honey; Monique Spaziani, The Revolving Doors (Les Portes tournantes)
Actor in a supporting role	Actress in a supporting role
Rémy Girard, The Revolving Doors (Les Portes tournantes); Maury Chaykin, Iron Eagle II; Ron James, Something About Love; Michael Rudder, Buying Time	Colleen Dewhurst, Hitting Home; Janet-Laine Green, Cowboys Don't Cry; Helen Hughes, Martha, Ruth and Edie; Miou-Miou, The Revolving Doors (Les Portes tournantes); Susan Douglas Rubeš, The Outside Chance of Maximilian Glick
Original Screenplay	Adapted Screenplay
Glen Salzman and Trevor D. Rhone, Milk and Honey; Claude Fournier, Michel Cournot, and Marie-José Raymond, The Mills of Power (Les Tisserands du pouvoir); Guy Maddin, Tales from the Gimli Hospital; André Melançon and Jacques Bobet, Tadpole and the Whale (La Grenouille et la baleine); Michael Rubbo, Tommy Tricker and the Stamp Traveller	David Cronenberg and Norman Snider, Dead Ringers; Douglas Bowie and Robin Spry, Hitting Home; Jackie Burroughs, A Winter Tan; Phil Savath, The Outside Chance of Maximilian Glick; Jacques Savoie and Francis Mankiewicz, The Revolving Doors (Les Portes tournantes)
Best Feature Length Documentary	Best Short Documentary
Comic Book Confidential — Ron Mann; Calling the Shots — Janis Cole, Holly Dale; Growing Up in America — Morley Markson; A Rustling of Leaves: Inside the Philippine Revolution — Nettie Wild; Witnesses: The Untold War in Afghanistan — Martyn Burke, David M. Ostriker	The World Is Watching — Harold Crooks, Jim Munro, Peter Raymont; Dying to Be Perfect — Eileen Hoeter; Space Pioneers, a Canadian Story — Rudy Buttignol
Best Live Action Short Drama	Best Animated Short
The Mysterious Moon Men of Canada — Bruce McDonald, Colin Brunton; Inside/Out — Lori Spring; The Job — Donald Scott; The Milkman Cometh — Lorne Bailey; Tenderfoot (Le Pied tendre) — Roger Boire, Viateur Castonguay	The Cat Came Back — Cordell Barker, Richard Condie; Nocturnes — Yves Leduc; Primiti Too Taa — Ed Ackerman
Art Direction/Production Design	Cinematography
Carol Spier, Dead Ringers; Vianney Gauthier, Straight for the Heart (À corps perdu); Anne Pritchard, The Revolving Doors (Les Portes tournantes)	Peter Suschitzky, Dead Ringers; Thomas Burstyn, Tadpole and the Whale (La Grenouille et la baleine); Karol Ike, Malarek; Pierre Mignot, Straight for the Heart (À corps perdu); René Ohashi, Shadow Dancing; Thomas Vámos, The Revolving Doors (Les Portes tournantes)
Costume Design	Editing
François Barbeau, The Revolving Doors (Les Portes tournantes); Renée April, The Kiss; Christine Cost and Michèle Hamel, The Mills of Power (Les Tisserands du pouvoir); Denise Cronenberg, Dead Ringers; Maya Mani, Shadow Dancing; Charlotte Penner, The Outside Chance of Maximilian Glick	Ronald Sanders, Dead Ringers; Michel Arcand, Straight for the Heart (À corps perdu); Susan Martin and Allan Lee, A Winter Tan
Overall Sound	Sound Editing
Don White, Andy Nelson and Bryan Day, Dead Ringers; Don Cohen, Austin Grimaldi, Keith Elliott, and Dino Pigat, The Kiss; Michael Liotta, Joe Grimaldi, Eli Yarkoni, and Dino Pigat, Iron Eagle II; Michael Liotta, Don White, and Aerlyn Weissman, A Winter Tan; Don White, Gabor Vadnay, Michael Liotta, and Joe Grimaldi, Hitting Home	Terry Burke, Richard Cadger, David Giammarco, Wayne Griffin, and David Evans, Dead Ringers; Alison Clark, Greg Glynn, Alison Grace, Andy Malcolm, and Denise McCormick, A Winter Tan; David Evans, Kenneth Heeley-Ray, Richard Cadger, Robin Leigh, Drew King, Iron Eagle II; Andy Malcolm, Alison Grace, Michael O'Farrell, Peter Thilaye, and Penny Hozy, The Kiss; Jane Tattersall, Tony Currie, Terry Burke, Marta Nielsen Sternberg, and Wayne Griffin, Buying Time
Achievement in Music: Original Score	Achievement in Music: Original Song
Howard Shore, Dead Ringers; Billy Bryans and Aaron Davis, Office Party; François Dompierre, The Revolving Doors (Les Portes tournantes); Richard Grégoire, The Heat Line (La ligne de chaleur); Osvaldo Montes, Straight for the Heart (À corps perdu); Maribeth Solomon and Micky Erbe, Milk and Honey	Louis Natale and Anne Wheeler, "Cowboys Don't Cry" — Cowboys Don't Cry; Louise Bennett, "You're Going Home" — Milk and Honey; Normand Dubé, Guy Trépanier and Nathalie Carson, "We Are the One" — Tadpole and the Whale (La Grenouille et la baleine); Jay Gruska and Marc Jordan, "Shadow Dance" — Shadow Dancing; Rufus Wainwright, "I'm Running" — Tommy Tricker and the Stamp Traveller
Special Awards	
Golden Reel Award: Tadpole and the Whale (La Grenouille et la baleine)	
