= 1988 Toronto International Film Festival =

Annual Canadian film festival

- Festival poster by Marie-Louise Cusack
- Opening film: Dead Ringers
- Location: Toronto, Ontario, Canada
- Hosted by: Toronto International Film Festival Group
- No. of films: 279 films
- Festival date: September 8, 1988–September 17, 1988
- Language: English
- Website: tiff.net
- 1989 1987

The 13th Toronto International Film Festival (TIFF) took place in Toronto, Ontario, Canada between September 8 and September 17, 1988. Midnight Madness programme was introduced at the festival. The festival screened 279 films from 38 countries. Women on the Verge of a Nervous Breakdown by Pedro Almodóvar won the Classic Film Award at the festival.

Dead Ringers by Toronto born David Cronenberg was selected as the opening film. Madame Sousatzka was the closing night film, with Shirley Maclaine attending.

The Ryerson Theatre was the venue for most of the 10 nightly galas. The only Canadian one was The Revolving Doors.

The festival featured a retrospective of 47 films from the Soviet Union, including the early films of Elem Klimov, and a tribute to Finnish brothers Mika and Aki Kaurismäki, including the 1983 Crime and Punishment and Helsinki Napoli All Night Long (1987).

== Awards ==
Award	Film	Director
John Labatt Classic Film Award	Women on the Verge of a Nervous Breakdown	Pedro Almodóvar
Toronto-City (Best Canadian Feature Film)	The Outside Chance of Maximilian Glick	Allan A. Goldstein
Four Seasons Hotel Critics' Award	Distant Voices, Still Lives	Terence Davies

Runners-up for the Classic Film Award were Earth Girls Are Easy, The Thin Blue Line, The Revolving Doors and Hawks. Runners-up for the Critics' Award were Women on the Verge of a Nervous Breakdown, Commissar and A Short Film About Killing.

== Programme ==
=== Main Gala Presentations ===
- (September 8) Dead Ringers by David Cronenberg
- (September 9) Earth Girls Are Easy by Julien Temple
- (September 10) Far North by Sam Shepard
- (September 11) A Few Days With Me by Claude Sautet
- (September 12) Miles from Home by Gary Sinise
- (September 13) The Revolving Doors by Francis Mankiewicz
- (September 14) Memories of Me by Henry Winkler
- (September 15) Criminal Law by Martin Campbell
- (September 16) Women on the Verge of a Nervous Breakdown by Pedro Almodóvar
- (September 17) Madame Sousatzka by John Schlesinger

=== Other Gala Presentations ===
- Distant Voices, Still Lives by Terence Davies
- Ei (Egg) by Danniel Danniel
- A Short Film About Killing by Krzysztof Kieślowski
- Chocolat by Claire Denis
- The Last of England by Derek Jarman
- Track 29 by Nicolas Roeg
- The Thin Blue Line by Errol Morris
- Red Sorghum by Zhang Yimou
- Wherever You Are... by Krzysztof Zanussi
- Love Is a Fat Woman by Alejandro Agresti
- The Way Things Go by Peter Fischli & David Weiss
- Hard Times by João Botelho
- Rouge by Stanley Kwan
- Story of Women by Claude Chabrol
- The Beast by Kevin Reynolds
- Três Menos Eu by João Canijo
- Tango Bar by Marcos Zurinaga

=== Canadian Perspective ===
- The Box of Sun (La boîte à soleil) by Jean Pierre Lefebvre
- Calling the Shots by Janis Cole and Holly Dale
- Comic Book Confidential by Ron Mann
- Consolations by R. Bruce Elder
- The Forgotten War by Richard Boutet
- Growing Up in America by Morley Markson
- The Heat Line by Hubert-Yves Rose
- I Will Make No More Boring Art by William D. MacGillivray
- Lac La Croix by Judith Doyle
- A Life by Frank Cole
- Milk and Honey by Glen Salzman and Rebecca Yates
- Name Your Poison It's a Scream Channel No. 5 by John Gagne
- Obsessed by Robin Spry
- The Outside Chance of Maximilian Glick by Allan A. Goldstein
- Palais Royale by Martin Lavut
- Pissoir by John Greyson
- Shadow Dancing by Lewis Furey
- Something About Love by Tom Berry
- The Squamish Five by Paul Donovan
- Straight for the Heart by Léa Pool
- Strangers in a Strange Land by Bob McKeown
- Turnabout by Don Owen
- Walking After Midnight by Jonathan Kay
- Witnesses: The Untold War in Afghanistan by Martyn Burke

=== Midnight Madness ===
- The Decline of Western Civilization Part II: The Metal Years by Penelope Spheeris
- Big Time by Chris Blum
- Hellbound: Hellraiser II by Tony Randel
- Heavy Petting by Obie Benz
- Forbidden to Forbid by Lothar Lambert
- Smoke 'Em If You Got 'Em by Ray Boseley
- Brand New Day by Amos Gitai
- Brain Damage by Frank Henenlotter

=== Open Vault ===
- Blackmail (1929) by Alfred Hitchcock
- Humoresque (1920) by Frank Borzage
- She Wore A Yellow Ribbon (1949) by John Ford
- Sodom and Gomorrah (1922) by Michael Curtiz

=== Other Films ===
- 36 Fillette by Catherine Breillat
- Avanti Popolo by Rafi Bukaee
- Because the Dawn by Amy Goldstein
- Bingo, Bridesmaids & Braces by Gillian Armstrong
- Birds of Prey by Gil Portes
- Borderline by Houchang Allahyari
- Break of Dawn by Isaac Artenstein
- Burning Snow by Patrick Tam
- The Cannibals by Manoel de Oliveira
- El Dorado by Carlos Saura
- The Comedy of Work by Luc Moullet
- Commissar by Aleksandr Askoldov
- Count Your Blessings by Pieter Verhoeff
- The Cry of Reason by Robert Bilheimer
- The Cry of the Owl by Claude Chabrol
- Damnation by Béla Tarr
- Daughter of the Nile by Hou Hsiao-hsien
- A Day on the Grand Canal with the Emperor of China by Philip Haas
- Dear America: Letters Home from Vietnam by Bill Couturié
- Dragon Chow by Jan Schütte
- Driving Me Crazy by Nick Broomfield
- Drowning by Numbers by Peter Greenaway
- Dzusovy Roman by Fero Fenič
- Encore by Paul Vecchiali
- Exti Jiban (Portrait of a Life) by Raja Mitra
- The Eye Above the Well by Johan van der Keuken
- Fable of the Beautiful Pigeon Fancier by Ruy Guerra
- Facades by Paul Winkler
- Filou by Samir Jamal al Din
- Four Adventures of Reinette and Mirabelle by Éric Rohmer
- Full Moon (Dolunay) by Sahin Kaygun
- Further and Particular by Stephen Dwoskin
- Georgia by Ben Lewin
- Ghosts... of the Civil Dead by John Hillcoat
- The Harms Case by Slobodan D. Pešic
- Havinck by Frans Weisz
- Hawks by Robert Ellis Miller
- Himmo, King of Jerusalem by Amos Guttman
- Imagen latente by Pablo Perelman
- In Georgia by Jürgen Böttcher
- Issue de secours by Thierry Michel
- Jane B. par Agnès V. by Agnès Varda
- The Jester and the Queen by Věra Chytilová
- Krik? Krak! Tales of a Nightmare by Jac Avila and Vanyoska Gee
- The Lair of the White Worm by Ken Russell
- Land of Dreams by Jan Troell
- Les Keufs by Josiane Balasko
- Let's Get Lost by Bruce Weber
- Lightning Over Braddock: A Rustbowl Fantasy by Tony Buba
- Linie 1 by Reinhard Hauff
- Little Dorrit by Christine Edzard
- Macao by Clemens Klopfenstein
- Macho Dancer by Lino Brocka
- The Man with Three Coffins by Lee Jang-ho
- Manifesto by Dušan Makavejev
- Miracle Mile by Steve De Jarnatt
- Mr. Jolly Lives Next Door by Stephen Frears
- El misterio Eva Perón by Tulio Demicheli
- My Dear Subject by Anne-Marie Miéville
- Nadie escuchaba by Néstor Almendros and Jorge Ulla
- The Navigator: A Medieval Odyssey by Vincent Ward
- Nice Coloured Girls by Tracey Moffatt
- On the Black Hill by Andrew Grieve
- Painted Faces by Alex Law
- Palisade by Laurie McInnes
- Paperhouse by Bernard Rose
- People's Hero by Derek Yee Tung-sing
- The Prince of Pennsylvania by Ron Nyswaner
- Rogue of the North by Fred Tan
- Salaam Bombay! by Mira Nair
- Snuff Bottle by Li Han-hsiang
- Soursweet by Mike Newell
- Spike of Bensonhurst by Paul Morrissey
- Summer Thefts by Yousry Nasrallah
- Superstar: The Karen Carpenter Story by Todd Haynes
- Sur by Fernando Solanas
- Suspended by Waldemar Krzystek
- Talking to Strangers by Rob Tregenza
- Tango: Our Dance by Jorge Zanada
- Tapeheads by Bill Fishman
- A Taxing Woman's Return by Juzo Itami
- Testament by John Akomfrah
- Three Sisters by Margarethe von Trotta
- Tiger Warsaw by Amin Q. Chaudhri
- Tudawali by Steve Jodrell
- Two Hotels in Our Troubled Middle East by Christian Blackwood
- A Very Old Man with Enormous Wings by Fernando Birri
- Verónico Cruz by Miguel Pereira
- Virgin Machine by Monika Treut
- Voices of Sarafina! by Nigel Noble
- War Party by Franc Roddam
- The Wash by Michael Toshiyuki Uno
- We Think the World of You by Colin Gregg
