= Any Woman Can =

Any Woman Can may refer to:

- Any Woman Can (TV series), a 1974–1975 home improvement series for women on CTV in Canada
- Any Woman Can!, a sex advice book written by David Reuben
