= Primiti Too Taa =

- Directed by: Ed Ackerman; Colin Morton
- Written by: Kurt Schwitters
- Produced by: Ed Ackerman; Colin Morton
- Narrated by: Colin Morton
- Animation by: Ed Ackerman; Herwig Gayer
- Production company: Meta Media
- Distributed by: Canadian Filmmakers Distribution Centre
- Release date: July 12, 1987 (Harbourfront)
- Running time: 6 minutes
- Country: Canada

Primiti Too Taa is a Canadian experimental animated short film, directed by Ed Ackerman and Colin Morton and released in 1987. Set to Morton reciting an excerpt from Kurt Schwitters's sound poem Ursonate, the film illustrates the soundtrack entirely through the movement of letters typed on paper with a Remington typewriter. The analogue typography was created by animator Herwig Gayer.

The film premiered at Harbourfront Centre in Toronto in July 1987, as part of a screening series staged by the Canadian Filmmakers Distribution Centre to mark its 20th anniversary. It was later screened at the 1987 Festival of Festivals as a prelude to the feature drama film Life Classes, before going on a wider tour of other Canadian and international film festivals.

The film was a Genie Award nominee for Best Animated Short at the 10th Genie Awards in 1989.
