= 1988 in Canadian television =

This is a list of Canadian television related events from 1988.

== Events ==
Date	Event
February 20	9th Genie Awards.
February 20	1988 Gemini Awards.
February 20	The 1988 Winter Olympics which were hosted in Calgary aired on all the CTV stations for two weeks.
May 1	Peter Mansbridge takes over as anchor and chief correspondent for The National. He replaces Knowlton Nash who had held the job since 1978.
August 6	The Raccoons begins airing on RTÉ in Ireland for the very first time. The series was starting transmitting on RTÉ One.
September 1	A number of new channels launch including Family Channel, MétéoMédia, TV5, VisionTV, VRAK.TV, The Weather Network, and YTV.
September 5	CIHF-TV launches. It launched as an independent station and would remain that until 1997 when it would join the Global system and be branded Global Maritimes, then renamed to Global Halifax in 2013.

=== Debuts ===
Show	Station	Premiere Date
Adrienne Clarkson Presents	CBC Television	January 3
Just for Laughs	CBC Television	January 3
Mount Royal	CTV	January 3
My Secret Identity	CTV	September 1
Tickle on the Tum	YTV	September 1
Maple Town	YTV	September 1
Zardip's Search for Healthy Wellness	TVOntario	September 1
The Ghosts of Motley Hall	YTV	September 16
Learning The Ropes	CTV	September 16
Electric Circus	Citytv	September 18
MovieTelevision	Citytv	unknown date
La Course destination monde	Télévision de Radio-Canada	unknown date

=== Ending this year ===
Show	Station	Cancelled
Adderly	Global	March 9
Check it Out!	CTV	April 1
Mount Royal	CTV	May 24
City Lights	Citytv	Unknown
Blizzard Island	CBC Television	Unknown

=== Changes of network affiliation ===
Show	Moved From	Moved To
Five Times Dizzy	Knowledge Network	YTV

== Television shows ==
=== 1950s ===
- Country Canada (1954–2007)
- Hockey Night in Canada (1952–present)
- The National (1954–present)
- Front Page Challenge (1957–1995)
- Wayne and Shuster Show (1958–1989)

=== 1960s ===
- CTV National News (1961–present)
- Land and Sea (1964–present)
- Man Alive (1967–2000)
- Mr. Dressup (1967–1996)
- The Nature of Things (1960–present, scientific documentary series)
- Question Period (1967–present, news program)
- The Tommy Hunter Show (1965–1992)
- W-FIVE (1966–present, newsmagazine program)

=== 1970s ===
- The Beachcombers (1972–1990)
- Canada AM (1972–2016, news program)
- Definition (1974–1989)
- the fifth estate (1975–present, newsmagazine program)
- Live It Up! (1978–1990)
- Marketplace (1972–present, newsmagazine program)
- Polka Dot Door (1971-1993)
- You Can't Do That on Television (1979–1990)
- 100 Huntley Street (1977–present, religious program)

=== 1980s ===
- Bumper Stumpers (1987–1990)
- The Campbells (1986–1990)
- CityLine (1987–present, news program)
- CODCO (1987–1993)
- The Comedy Mill (1986–1991)
- Danger Bay (1984–1990)
- Degrassi Junior High (1987–1989)
- The Journal (1982–1992)
- Midday (1985–2000)
- Night Heat (1985–1989)
- On the Road Again (1987–2007)
- The Raccoons (1985–1992)
- Street Legal (1987–1994)
- Super Dave (1987–1991)
- Switchback (1981–1990)
- Talkabout (1988-1990)
- T. and T. (1987–1990)
- Under the Umbrella Tree (1986–1993)
- Venture (1985–2007)
- Video Hits (1984–1993)

== TV movies ==
- Care Bears Nutcracker Suite
- Family Reunion
- The King Chronicle
- Mama's Going to Buy You a Mockingbird
- A Nest of Singing Birds
- The Squamish Five
- Two Men

== Television stations ==
=== Debuts ===
Date	Market	Station	Channel	Affiliation	Notes/References
June 28	Rivière-du-Loup, Quebec	CFTF-TV		TQS	
September 5	Saint John, New Brunswick	CIHT-TV-2	12	Independent	

== Births ==
Date	Name	Notability
April 21	Robbie Amell	Actor

== See also ==
- 1988 in Canada
- List of Canadian films of 1988
