= Allan Armitage =

American botanist

- Born: Allan M. Armitage; June 1, 1946 (age 80); Canada
- Education: University of Guelph; Michigan State University
- Scientific career
- Fields: Geology
- Workplaces: University of Georgia

Allan M. Armitage (1 June 1946) is professor of horticulture at the University of Georgia, US, where he teaches, conducts research, and runs the University of Georgia Horticulture Gardens—producing annual guidelines for annuals and perennials suitable for heat and humidity.

== Career ==
Armitage travels widely as a lecturer and consultant and has received numerous awards from nursery trade groups and horticultural organizations, including the Medal of Honor from the Garden Club of America. He was recognized as one of the best teachers in the nation when he received the distinguished National Educator Award from the American Horticultural Society.

He is well known as a writer, speaker and researcher throughout the world. He holds his B.Sc. from Macdonald College, Quebec, M.Sc. from University of Guelph, Ontario, and his Ph.D. from Michigan State. His publications include nine books and more than 350 articles and papers.

Armitage has lectured in Canada, the United States, China, Colombia, New Zealand, Australia and Europe. He has visited research centers and production centers throughout the world and is constantly studying annuals, perennials, cut flowers, and greenhouse crops in various climates. He teaches courses in greenhouse production, greenhouse crop management, and herbaceous plant identification and use.

He writes a monthly column for Greenhouse Grower magazine, a national trade journal, in which he discusses new crops and new trends in floriculture.

In the plant community Armitage is well known for wearing a Tilley hat. It is such a part of his personal image that when he published his memoir in 2015, it was titled, It's Not Just About The Hat: The Unlikely Journey of a Plantsman.

== Publications ==
- Armitage, Allan M. Armitage's Native Plants for North American Gardens. Timber Press: Portland, 2006. ISBN 978-0-88192-760-3.
- Armitage, Allan M. Armitage's Garden Annuals: A Color Encyclopedia. Timber Press: Portland, 2004. ISBN 978-0-88192-617-0.
- Armitage, Allan M., and Judy M. Laushman. Specialty Cut Flowers: The Production of Annuals, Perennials, Bulbs, and Woody Plants for Fresh and Dried Cut Flowers. Second Ed. Timber Press: Portland, 2003. ISBN 978-0-88192-579-1.
- Armitage, Allan M. Armitage's Manual of Annuals, Biennials, and Half-Hardy Perennials. Timber Press: Portland, 2001. ISBN 978-0-88192-505-0.
- Armitage, Allan M. Armitage's Garden Perennials: A Color Encyclopedia. Timber Press: Portland, 2000. ISBN 978-0-88192-435-0.
- Armitage, Allan M. Herbaceous Perennial Plants: A Treatise on Their Identification, Culture, and Garden Attributes. 2nd Edition. Ball Publishing: Batavia, 1998. ISBN 0-87563-810-4.
