= Walking After Midnight =

Walking After Midnight may refer to:

- Walking After Midnight (1988 film), Canadian documentary film
- Walking After Midnight (1992 film), Turkish film
- Walkin' After Midnight, 1957 Patsy Cline song
