= The Assignment (1997 film) =

- Theatrical release poster
- Directed by: Christian Duguay
- Written by: Dan Gordon; Sabi H. Shabtai
- Produced by: Franco Battista; Tom Berry
- Starring: Aidan Quinn; Donald Sutherland; Ben Kingsley
- Cinematography: Christian Duguay; David Franco
- Edited by: Yves Langlois
- Music by: Normand Corbeil
- Production company: Triumph Films
- Distributed by: Sony Pictures Releasing
- Release date: 26 September 1997
- Running time: 119 minutes
- Countries: Canada; United States
- Language: English
- Box office: $332,597

The Assignment is a 1997 spy action thriller film directed by Christian Duguay and starring Aidan Quinn (in two roles), with Donald Sutherland and Ben Kingsley. The film, written by Dan Gordon and Sabi H. Shabtai, is set mostly in the late 1980s and deals with a CIA plan to use Quinn's character to masquerade as the Venezuelan terrorist Carlos the Jackal.

== Plot ==
In 1974, Carlos the Jackal has sex and kills a spider with his cigarette then evicts the woman from his room. He dons a disguise and walks to a cafe where CIA agent Henry Fields is sitting at a table. Recognizing Fields, Carlos asks for a light. Fields does not recognize Carlos, because of his disguise. Carlos then detonates a grenade, killing dozens of people.

The next year, Carlos attacks an OPEC meeting in Austria to earn a ransom. To identify Carlos, the CIA sends Fields, who secretly plans to assassinate him with a concealed pistol. The plan is foiled when his CIA superior stops him from reaching out to shake Carlos' hand because he might be photographed doing so by nearby journalists.

In 1986, Carlos is apparently apprehended in an open-air market in Jerusalem and brutally interrogated by Mossad commander Amos. The man claims to actually be a US naval officer named Annibal Ramirez whose identification was lost in the chaos of his arrest. Amos confirms his identity and lets him go, stunned that Ramirez looks exactly like Carlos. Back at home, Ramirez is visited by Fields (now using the name Jack Shaw) who tries to recruit him to impersonate the terrorist leader. Ramirez refuses.

Shaw persists, turning up at a Navy ball and trying to goad Ramirez into taking the assignment. He succeeds by confronting Ramirez with the human cost of Carlos' terrorism by taking him to Bethesda Naval Hospital to see a boy who was crippled by one of Carlos' bombs.

Amos and Shaw train Ramirez at a former prison in Canada. Much of his training is devoted to situational awareness and internalizing details of Carlos' life. His training concludes with Carla, one of Carlos' ex-mistresses, training Ramirez in how to have sex like Carlos. The plan revolves around convincing the KGB, which is financing his terrorism, that Carlos has begun selling information to the CIA. Shaw lures one of Carlos' ex-lovers, Agnieska, to Libya, where Ramirez convinces her of his legitimacy. However, he notices she has become an informant for French intelligence. French agents arrive at their apartment, and Ramirez is forced to kill them.

Carlos sends an assassin to kill Agnieska in France, ordering him to leave Europe through London. The assassin happens to be in Heathrow Airport at the same time as Ramirez, and realizes Ramirez is an impostor after he fails to recognize a code phrase. During a struggle, Amos and the assassin kill each other. After Amos' death, the CIA suspends the operation and Ramirez returns home.

Ramirez has sex with his wife as Carlos would, and she is disturbed by his change. The next day, at his son's little league game, he gets into a confrontation with another father and nearly kills him. Shaw bails him out of jail; both men are suffering from the failure of their mission. Ramirez accuses Shaw of fabricating the scene at the hospital to trick him into accepting the assignment and Shaw threatens to use the Ramirez family as bait to lure out Carlos if he tries to back out. That night, Ramirez reveals the mission to his wife.

Ramirez and Shaw meet up in East Berlin and the KGB photographs them, assuming Carlos has been turned. Enraged, the KGB raids Carlos' safe house, but he escapes. Shaw and Ramirez wait outside for him, and Ramirez fights Carlos on the bank of the Spree River. Eventually, one of the two men is held under water by the other. To save the latter, Shaw shoots at the former. He realizes too late that he has shot Ramirez, and Carlos swims away. Ramirez presses Shaw to leave him and kill Carlos, but Shaw insists that their plan has worked and that Carlos is now a target of the KGB.

Back home, a car bomb appears to kill Ramirez and his family, and Shaw attends the funeral. In St. Martin, Ramirez receives a news clipping of the bombing with a congratulatory note from Shaw, implying that he staged the killing to liberate the Ramirez family. Ramirez nearly kills a spider in its web like Carlos, but does not. Carlos is arrested in 1994.

== Cast ==
- Aidan Quinn as Lt. Cmdr. Annibal Ramirez / Carlos
- Donald Sutherland as Jack Shaw (Henry Fields)
- Ben Kingsley as Amos
- Claudia Ferri as Maura Ramirez
- Vlasta Vrána as KGB Head Officer
- Liliana Komorowska as Agnieska
- Von Flores as Koj
- Daniel Pilon as Admiral Crawford
- Claude Genest as Baseball Dad
- Céline Bonnier as Carla

== Reception ==
Rotten Tomatoes gives The Assignment a rating of 62% from 21 reviews.

Roger Ebert of the Chicago Sun-Times gave the film 3.5 out of 4 stars, calling it "fascinating because its characters can be believed, because there is at least a tiny nugget of truth in the story, and because from the deceptive opening credits, this is a film that creates the right world for these characters to inhabit."
