= A Choice of Futures =

Canadian television series

- Genre: Science documentary; Science fiction
- Country of origin: Canada
- Original language: English
- No. of seasons: 1
- No. of episodes: 3

Production
- Executive producer: Vincent Tovell

Original release
- Network: CBC Television
- Release: 24 May – 7 June 1967

A Choice of Futures is a Canadian television miniseries that aired on CBC Television in 1967.

== Premise ==
The series was a Canadian centennial project, generally based on the theme of Canada's future, and that of Earth.

== Episodes ==
=== "The Earth Is a Very Small Spaceship" ===
The first episode, "The Earth Is a Very Small Spaceship", is a documentary broadcast on 24 May 1967 concerning the environmental situation of Earth and speculating on its future, likening the planet to a spaceship with a limited capacity. Potential settlement of the moon and undersea locations was also discussed. It was written, directed and narrated by William Whitehead. Vincent Tovell was its producer.

=== "Therefore Choose Life" ===
"Therefore Choose Life" was broadcast 31 May 1967 as an essay which described how technology was capable of degrading and destroying life on the planet. Despite its negative viewpoint, the programme promoted the contrasting notion that technology should instead be used to preserve life. Tom Koch was the episode's producer and director.

=== "1999" ===
The final episode airing on 7 June 1967 was the futuristic drama "1999", written by Eric Koch. Its plot features future Prime Minister Robert Ghiberti (John Colicos) who faces a student uprising on the last day of 1999 that puts a multilateral weapons control pact in jeopardy.

"1999" was directed by Melwyn Breen.

== Scheduling ==
The series was rebroadcast on 10–24 September 1967, and 3–10 July 1968.
