= Forbidden Journey =

- Directed by: Richard J. Jarvis; Cecil Maiden
- Written by: Richard J. Jarvis; Cecil Maiden
- Produced by: Richard J. Jarvis; Cecil Maiden
- Starring: John Colicos; Jan Rubeš; Susan Douglas Rubeš
- Cinematography: Roger Racine
- Edited by: Richard J. Jarvis
- Music by: Oskar Morawetz
- Production company: Selkirk Films
- Distributed by: United Artists
- Release date: September 22, 1950
- Running time: 95 minutes
- Country: Canada
- Language: English

Forbidden Journey was a 1950 political thriller film situated in post-World War II Canada.

A communist spy (Jan Rubeš) attempts to pass information to his uncle in Canada while spies try to hunt him down. It starred Jan Rubeš and his future wife Susan Douglas.

The film premiered at the Princess Theater in Montreal, Quebec, Canada on September 22, 1950. The release did not sell well and had mixed reviews. It was criticized for insufficient excitement, weak villains and a poor plot and sound.
