= Life Classes =

- Directed by: William D. MacGillivray
- Written by: William D. MacGillivray
- Produced by: William D. MacGillivray (executive producer); Stephen Reynolds (producer)
- Starring: Jacinta Cormier; Leon Dubinsky; Leo Jessome; Frances Knickle
- Cinematography: Lionel Simmons
- Edited by: William D. MacGillivray
- Music by: Alexander Tilley
- Distributed by: Cinephile
- Release date: October 2, 1987
- Running time: 117 minutes
- Country: Canada
- Language: English

Life Classes is a 1987 Canadian drama film directed by William D. MacGillivray.

== Plot ==
Mary Cameron (Cormier) lives on the Canadian island of Cape Breton, Nova Scotia. There, she enjoys a warm relationship with an old woman she calls Nanny (Garbary), who regales her with stories of the Gaelic past. The rest of her time, when she isn't working at her father's pharmacy, she completes paint by numbers artworks. On discovering that she is pregnant by her boyfriend, she decides to go to Halifax, to have her baby. After giving birth, she starts modeling for life-drawing classes and eventually picks up the skills of an artist herself. Soon, she has become a successful artist and moves back to the house her friend Nanny left her to fill an entirely new role in her community.

== Cast ==
- Jacinta Cormier as Mary Cameron
- Leon Dubinsky as Earl
- Leo Jessome as Mary's father
- Frances Knickle as Gloria

== Awards ==
- 1988
  - Genie Award for Best Motion Picture - Nominated (Stephen Reynolds)
  - Genie Award for Best Original Song - Nominated (William D. MacGillivray)
  - Genie Award for Best Performance by an Actor in a Supporting Role - Nominated (Leon Dubinsky)
  - Genie Award for Best Performance by an Actress in a Leading Role - Nominated (Jacinta Cormier)
  - Genie Award for Best Original Screenplay - Nominated (William D. MacGillivray)
  - 38th Berlin International Film Festival: Golden Bear - Nominated
- 1989
  - Istanbul International Film Festival Special Prize of the Jury - William D. MacGillivray - Won
