= Nocturnes (film) =

- Directed by: François Aubry
- Written by: François Aubry
- Produced by: Yves Leduc; Robert Forget
- Starring: Martin Foster
- Cinematography: Francois Aubry; Jacques Avoine; Jimmy Chin
- Edited by: Werner Nold
- Music by: Denis Larochelle
- Animation by: François Aubry
- Production company: National Film Board of Canada
- Release date: 1988 (FFM)
- Running time: 9 minutes
- Country: Canada

Nocturnes is a Canadian animated short film, directed by François Aubry and released in 1988. Mixing live action with animation, the film imagines the creative process through a depiction of Martin Foster, at the time a violinist with the Montreal Symphony Orchestra, as a composer who is accessing the ultimate cosmic source of all artistic inspiration as he creates a new work.

Some sources have attributed British actor Hugh Grant with a role in the film as Frédéric Chopin; however, this may be an erroneous conflation with a different film, as Aubry's film features neither spoken dialogue nor any depiction of Chopin, and does not list Grant in its credits.

The film premiered at the 1988 Montreal World Film Festival.

It received a Genie Award nomination for Best Animated Short at the 10th Genie Awards in 1989.
