= Crazy Moon (film) =

- Directed by: Allan Eastman
- Written by: Tom Berry; Stefan Wodoslawsky
- Produced by: Franco Battista; Tom Berry; Stefan Wodoslawsky
- Starring: Kiefer Sutherland; Vanessa Vaughan; Peter Spence
- Cinematography: Savas Kalogeras
- Edited by: Franco Battista
- Music by: Lou Forestieri
- Production companies: Allegro Films; Telefilm Canada; National Film Board of Canada
- Distributed by: Miramax Films
- Release date: 11 December 1987
- Running time: 82 minutes
- Countries: Canada; United States
- Language: English

Crazy Moon is a 1987 romantic comedy film directed by Allan Eastman and written by Tom Berry and Stefan Wodoslawsky. Starring Kiefer Sutherland and Vanessa Vaughan, it follows the relationship between a deaf woman and an offbeat hearing man.

Crazy Moon was produced with the participation of Telefilm Canada and the National Film Board of Canada. Miramax Films acquired the distribution rights and released the film in the United States on 11 December 1987.

== Plot ==
Brooks is a misfit teenager and kleptomaniac who has an affinity for Big Band music and the 1940s-era style of dressing. He clashes with his wealthy, straight-laced father and is looked down on by his older brother Cleveland. One day, Brooks goes to a sporting goods store to steal a mannequin. He catches the attention of Anne, a young deaf woman who works at the store. Brooks and Anne begin a relationship in which each teaches the other to confront a personal fear; Anne shows Brooks how to overcome his fear of swimming, and Brooks coaches Anne on how to improve her speech.

== Cast ==
- Kiefer Sutherland as Brooks
- Vanessa Vaughan as Anne
- Peter Spence as Cleveland
- Ken Pogue as Alec
- Eve Napier as Mimi
- Sean McCann as Anne's Father
- Bronwen Mantel as Anne's Mother
- Terri Hawkes as Pamela

== Critical reception ==
Crazy Moon received mixed critical reviews. Caryn James of The New York Times said the film "keeps threatening to become "Children of a Lesser God Goes to High School", but Sutherland and "his co-star, Vanessa Vaughan, save 'Crazy Moon' from its own worst tendencies". James added the film "glosses over the difference between learning to swim – no matter how deep Brooks's fears – and adjusting as a deaf person in a hearing world. It diminishes the problems of both characters, and cheapens the film's message." Of Vaughan, James said she "acts defiantly against this dreadful script, and gives Anne remarkable composure; she is the most level-headed, engaging character."

Michael Walsh of Reeling Back also praised Vaughn, saying "she steals the show with her performance and provides Eastman's picture with its best moments." Shaun Lang of Hollywood North Magazine wrote the film "is a light, quirky romance that mixes just the right amount of classic screwball comedy with the spirit of John Hughes."

== See also ==
- List of films featuring the deaf and hard of hearing
