= Witnesses: The Untold War in Afghanistan =

1988 Canadian documentary film

- Directed by: Martyn Burke
- Written by: Martyn Burke
- Produced by: David M. Ostriker
- Narrated by: Martyn Burke
- Cinematography: Francis Granger; Pascal Manoukian
- Edited by: Daria Milne
- Production company: Stornoway Productions
- Release date: September 11, 1988 (TIFF)
- Running time: 90 minutes
- Country: Canada
- Language: English

Witnesses: The Untold War in Afghanistan is a Canadian documentary film, directed by Martyn Burke and released in 1988. The film is a portrait of the Soviet–Afghan War of the 1980s, as told through the testimonies of various people who had been on the ground as first-hand witnesses to the events.

The film premiered at the 1988 Festival of Festivals.

The film received a Genie Award nomination for Best Feature Length Documentary at the 10th Genie Awards in 1989.
