= Something About Love (film) =

1988 film

- Directed by: Tom Berry
- Written by: Tom Berry; Stefan Wodoslawsky
- Produced by: Tom Berry; Stefan Wodoslawsky; Franco Battista; Eric Rose
- Starring: Stefan Wodoslawsky; Jan Rubeš; Jennifer Dale; Ron James
- Cinematography: Rodney Gibbons
- Edited by: Franco Battista
- Music by: Lou Forestieri
- Production companies: Allegro Films; National Film Board of Canada
- Distributed by: Malo Video; New World Video
- Release date: September 1988
- Running time: 93 minutes
- Country: Canada
- Language: English

Something About Love is a Canadian drama film, directed by Tom Berry and released in 1988. The film stars Stefan Wodoslawsky as Wally Olynyk, a man returning home to Cape Breton Island after several years living in the United States, to reunite with his estranged father Stan (Jan Rubeš) as the older man begins to suffer from dementia.

The film's cast also includes Jennifer Dale, Ron James, Lenore Zann, Don Lake, Wayne Robson and Susan Rubeš.

The film received two Genie Award nominations at the 10th Genie Awards in 1989, for Best Actor (Jan Rubeš) and Best Supporting Actor (James).
