= John Colicos =

Canadian actor (1928–2000)

John Colicos OOnt
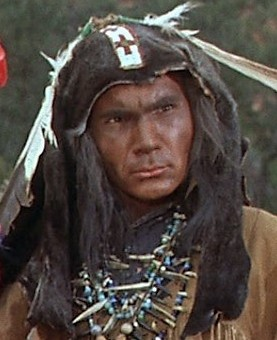
- Colicos in War Drums (1957)
- Born: December 10, 1928; Toronto, Ontario, Canada
- Died: March 6, 2000 (aged 71); Toronto, Ontario, Canada
- Occupation: Actor
- Years active: 1950–1999
- Spouse: Mona McHenry (m. 1956; div. 1981)
- Children: 2

John Colicos OOnt (December 10, 1928 – March 6, 2000) was a Canadian actor noted for his Shakespearean roles on stage, particularly with the Stratford Festival, but became well-known to science fiction fans for his roles as Klingon commander Kor on Star Trek: The Original Series and Star Trek: Deep Space Nine, and as the villainous Baltar on the original Battlestar Galactica.

== Early life ==
Colicos was born in Toronto, Ontario, to a Greek father and a Canadian mother. He was raised in Montreal. He made his acting debut playing Jesus in a Christmas pageant, later joking "one of the first roles I ever played was the Son of God, and I've been going downhill ever since."

As a teenager, he acted with the Canadian Art Theatre and trained at the Brae Manor Playhouse in Knowlton, before making his professional debut with the Montreal Repertory Theatre.

== Career ==
=== Theatre ===
Colicos worked on CBC Radio dramas with Douglas Rain. In 1951, Colicos won the Best Actor Award at the Dominion Drama Festival. He moved to England to work at the Old Vic for the 1951-52 season. At the age of 22 he played the title role in King Lear, the youngest actor to play the part at the Old Vic. He also starred in a production of Timon of Athens, then starred in The Ghost Writers on the West End.

In 1956, Colicos made his Broadway debut, playing Edmund in Orson Welles' production of King Lear. In 1957, he starred in Mary Stuart at the Phoenix Theatre. That same year, he joined the American Shakespeare Theatre for two seasons. In 1961, Colicos joined the Stratford Festival, for four seasons. He played King Lear in the Festival's first-ever production of the play in 1964.

His other New York theatre credits included The Devils (1965–66), Serjeant Musgrave's Dance (1966), and Soldiers (1967–68). His role in the latter play, where he portrayed Winston Churchill, was described as "uncannily believable.... hypnotically interesting. The actor created, not a replica, but a strong impression of the great man."

In 1982, he played "Sir" in The Dresser at the Citadel Theatre in Edmonton.

=== Film and television ===
Colicos made his screen acting debut in the Canadian film Forbidden Journey (1950).

He appeared as Monks in a television version of Oliver Twist for the DuPont Show of the Month series in 1959. He also gave memorable performances in 1966 on the CBS soap opera The Secret Storm; as the unscrupulous Thomas Cromwell in the 1969 movie version of Anne of the Thousand Days; and as the governor of Umakran in the episode "The Goddess Calabra" from the 1973 TV show The Starlost.

On American television, he established himself as a science-fiction villain icon, portraying the first Klingon ever seen in the Star Trek franchise, Commander Kor in the Original Series episode "Errand of Mercy" (1967). Colicos worked with Gene Roddenberry designing the look the Klingons have on Star Trek (1966). Budget constraints prevented the extensive makeup the Klingons were supposed to have so Colicos suggested they have a leathery Genghis Khan look, dark skin and hair. Over a quarter-century after his initial appearance in the Star Trek franchise, Colicos reprised his role as the 140-year-old Kor in three episodes of Star Trek: Deep Space Nine, telecast between 1994 and 1998.

He also portrayed Lord Baltar in the original Battlestar Galactica movie and television series.

Aside from his science-fiction roles, Colicos also appeared numerous times in episodic television from the 1960s onwards, including the portrayal of the villain on three episodes of Mission: Impossible. He appeared in four episodes of the CBC docu-drama The National Dream as the "railway general" William Cornelius Van Horne. He appeared in seven episodes of Mannix. The last person shot and killed in the television series Gunsmoke (1955–1975) was Judge Flood, played by Colicos in episode 631, "Hard Labor".

Several years after his Battlestar Galactica tenure, Colicos again ventured into science fiction. In August and September 1981, he portrayed Mikkos Cassadine, a demented, power-mad businessman bent on freezing the world, on the ABC soap opera General Hospital. He was also the voice of the X-Men villain Apocalypse/En Sabah Nur (1993–1995) in the Fox Kids animated X-Men television series in the nineties, and twice played rogue alien Quinn in the first season (1988–1989) of War of the Worlds.

In 1982 he ventured into educational TV with TVOntario's award-winning production of Prophecy with John Colicos. The writer/director, Robert Gardner, recalled his initial meeting with the actor: "I had seen him scores of times in movies and television and I was very nervous. In truth, though, he was a joy to work with. Once he sensed that you were prepared he was thoroughly professional. His presence in the ninety-minute production was the main reason it went on to win the prestigious Gold Medal at the Atlanta International Film Festival."

He appeared in TV commercials during the 1990s for America's Best Contacts & Eyeglasses. Colicos' final acting appearance was his reprise of Baltar in the concept demonstration trailer Battlestar Galactica: The Second Coming, exhibited at many science fiction conventions in 1999.

== Personal life ==
Colicos wed Mona McHenry in 1956 and divorced in 1981. They had two sons, Nicolas (also an actor) and Edmund. The family lived at a Victorian-style mansion in Toronto, where Colicos owned a 4,000-volume theatrical research library.

Colicos received the Order of Ontario in 1997.

=== Death ===
Colicos died in Toronto on March 6, 2000, at the age of 71, after a series of heart attacks.

== Partial stage credits ==
Year	Title	Role	Venue	Ref.
1951-52	Timon of Athens		The Old Vic, London	
1951-52	King Lear	Lear	The Old Vic, London	
1955	The Ghost Writers	Ralph Sherman	Cambridge Arts Theatre, London	
1956	King Lear	Edmund	New York City Center, New York	
1957	The Merchant of Venice	Gratiano	American Shakespeare Theatre, Stratford	
1957	Much Ado About Nothing	Leonato	American Shakespeare Theatre, Stratford	
1957	Othello	Lodovico	American Shakespeare Theatre, Stratford	
1957	Mary Stuart	Sir Edward Mortimer	Phoenix Theatre, New York City	
1958	Hamlet	Laertes	American Shakespeare Theatre, Stratford	
1958	The Winter's Tale	Leontes	American Shakespeare Theatre, Stratford	
1958	A Midsummer Night's Dream	Lysander	American Shakespeare Theatre, Stratford	
1961	Love's Labour's Lost	Berowne	Festival Theatre, Stratford	
1961	Coriolanus	Tullus Aufidius	Festival Theatre, Stratford	
1962	The Tempest	Caliban	Festival Theatre, Stratford	
1962	The Taming of the Shrew	Petruchio	Festival Theatre, Stratford	
1963	Troilus and Cressida	Hector	Festival Theatre, Stratford	
1963	Timon of Athens	Timon	Festival Theatre, Stratford	
1963	Cyrano de Bergerac	Cyrano de Bergerac	Festival Theatre, Stratford	
1964	Timon of Athens	Timon	Festival Theatre, Stratford	
1964	Love's Labour's Lost	Berowne	Festival Theatre, Stratford	
1964	Love's Labour's Lost	Berowne	Chichester Festival Theatre, Chichester	
1964	King Lear	Lear	Festival Theatre, Stratford	
1964	The Country Wife	Mr. Horner	Festival Theatre, Stratford	
1965-66	The Devils	Baron de Laubardemont	Broadway Theatre, New York City	
1966	Serjeant Musgrave's Dance	Serjeant "Black Jack" Musgrave	Lucille Lortel Theatre, New York City	
1967	Macbeth	Macbeth	American Shakespeare Theatre, Stratford	
1968	Soldiers	Winston Churchill	Billy Rose Theatre, New York City	
1968	Soldiers	Winston Churchill	New Theatre, London	
1968	Soldiers	Winston Churchill	Royal Alexandra Theatre, Toronto	
1982	The Dresser	Sir	Citadel Theatre, Edmonton	

== Filmography ==
=== Film ===
John Colicos film credits
Year	Title	Role	Notes	Ref.
1950	Forbidden Journey	Student		
1953	Appointment in London	Pip	Uncredited	
1955	Barbados Quest	Mustachioed Henchman	U.S. title: Murder On Approval	
1956	Bond of Fear	Dewar		
1956	Passport to Treason	Pietro		
1956	Breakaway	First Kidnapper		
1957	War Drums	Chino		
1964	The Naked Flame	Blackmailer	Uncredited	
1969	Anne of the Thousand Days	Thomas Cromwell		
1971	Doctors' Wives	Dr. Mort Dellman		
1971	Raid on Rommel	Sgt. Allan MacKenzie		
1971	Red Sky at Morning	Jimbob Buel		
1972	The Wrath of God	Colonel Santilla		
1973	Scorpio	McLeod		
1976	Breaking Point	Vincent Karbone		
1976	Drum	Bernard DeMarigny		
1978	Battlestar Galactica	Count Baltar	125-minute Theatrical release	
1979	King Solomon's Treasure	Allan Quatermain		
1979	Mission Galactica: The Cylon Attack	Lord Baltar	Theatrical release of a merger of 2 TV episodes	
1980	Conquest of the Earth	Lord Baltar	Theatrical release of a merger of 2 TV episodes	
1980	The Changeling	Captain DeWitt		
1980	Phobia	Inspector Larry Barnes		
1981	The Postman Always Rings Twice	Nick Papadakis		
1986	The Last Season	Walter Batterinski	AKA L'Ultima Stagione	
1987	Nowhere to Hide	General Clay Howard		
1988	Shadow Dancing	Anthony Podopolis		
1995	No Contest	Senator Donald Wilson		
1999	Battlestar Galactica: The Second Coming	Baltar	Short film (4-minute promotional for potential sequel film)	

=== Television ===
John Colicos television credits
Year	Title	Role	Notes	Ref.
1953	Captain Brassbound's Conversion	Sidi el Assif	Television film	
1953	Sunday Night Theatre	Christopher 'Kit' Marlowe	Episode: "Will Shakespeare"	
1953	Douglas Fairbanks Presents	Brown	Episode: "The Heel"	
1953	Playbill	Unknown	Episode: "Lord Arthur Savile's Crime"	
1953–1960	General Motors Theatre	Uturu / Luke Richardson / Kroll	4 episodes	
1954	The Secret Storm	Matthew Devereaux		
1955	London Playhouse	Charlie	Episode: "Adeline Girard"	
1956	The Taming of the Shrew	Lucentio	Television film	
1956	You Are There	Alexander Smith	Episode: "Mr. Christian Seizes the Bounty (April 28, 1789)"	
1956	The Adventures of Hiram Holliday	Thief	Episode: "Lapidary Wheel"	
1957	Studio One	Gold Root	Episode: "The Rice Sprout Song"	
1958	DuPont Show of the Month	Hindley Earnshaw	Episode: "Wuthering Heights"	
1958–1960	DuPont Show of the Month	Fernand Mondego / Monks / Mr. Arrow	Episodes: "The Count of Monte Cristo", "Olifer Twist", "Treasure Island"	
1959	Folio	Unknown	Episode: "Ward No. Six"	
1959	Berkeley Square	Tom Pettigrew	Television film	
1959	The Unforeseen	Count Cagliostro	Episode: "Checkmate"	
1959	Startime	Andy	Episode: "A Clearing in the Woods"	
1960	The Play of the Week	Mortimer	Episode: "Mary Stuart"	
1960	NBC Sunday Showcase	Aaron Burr	Episode: "Our American Heritage: Not Without Honor"	
1960	Our American Heritage	Aaron Burr	2 episodes	
1960	Omnibus	Gen. George McClellan	Episode: "He Shall Have Power"	
1960	Family Classics: The Three Musketeers	Porthos	Television film	
1960–1963	The United States Steel Hour	Dr. Steve Bruchesi / Edmund Hobert / Silvio	3 episodes	
1961	Vanity Fair	Rawdon Crawley	Episode: "Part 1"	
1961	The Man Born to Be King	Jesus Christ	Television film	
1961	Festival	Lord Arthur Savile	Episode: "Lord Arthur Savile's Crime"	
1962	John Brown's Body	Unknown	Television film	
1962	Playdate	Puff / Ernst Herman / Dr. Bruchesi	3 episodes	
1962	Cyrano De Bergerac	Comte de Guiche	Television film	
1963	Festival	Poet	Episode: "Ivan"	
1963	Festival	Gregers Werle	Episode: "The Wild Duck"	
1963	Festival	Galileo Galilei	Episode: "Galileo"	
1965	The Defenders	District Attorney / District Attorney Scott Turner	2 episodes	
1965	Profiles in Courage	Sen. Davis / Patrick Henry	2 episodes	
1965	Armchair Mystery Theatre	Ricardo	Episode: "Licence to Murder"	
1967	T.H.E. Cat	King Delphine	Episode: "A Slight Family Trait"	
1967	Star Trek: The Original Series	Kor	Episode: "Errand of Mercy"	
1967	A Choice of Futures	Prime Minister Robert Ghiberti	Episode: "1999"	
1967–1970	Mission: Impossible	Chief of Internal Security Manuel Ferrar / Milos Kuro / Commissioner Taal Jankowski	3 episodes	
1967–1974	Mannix	Dr. Myles Considine / Lytell / Duke Benedict / Alton K. Moore / David Barker / Eddie Lee Prentiss	7 episodes (Including Pilot)	
1969	Dulcima	Mr. Parker	Television film	
1969	The Name of the Game	Rafael	Episode: "High Card"	
1970	The High Chaparral	Matthew Kendall	Episode: "The Journal of Death"	
1970	Then Came Bronson	Harve Traine	Episode: "Still Waters"	
1970	It Takes a Thief	The Man	Episode: "Project "X""	
1970	The Young Rebels	British Colonel	Episode: "The Blood of an Englishman"	
1970, 1975	Hawaii Five-O	Lorenzo Corman / Mr. Thorncrest	2 episodes	
1971	Night Gallery	Survivor	Segment: "Lone Survivor"	
1971	Goodbye, Raggedy Ann	Paul Jamison	Television film	
1972	Longstreet	Arnold Zaduck	Episode: "Sad Songs and Other Conversations"	
1972	The F.B.I.	Logan	Episode: "The Test"	
1972–1975	Dr. Simon Locke	Dekker / Police Sergeant	2 episodes	
1973	Portrait: A Man Whose Name Was John	Numan Menemengioglu	Television film	
1973	The Starlost	The Governor	Episode: "The Goddess Calabra"	
1974	The Magician	Paul Gunther	2 episodes	
1974	The Lives of Benjamin Franklin	Wentworth	Episode: "The Ambassador"	
1974	Salty	Dobbs	Episode: "For the Price of Freedom"	
1974	The National Dream	Cornelius Van Horne	Television miniseries	
1974–1975	Performance	Smirnov	2 episodes	
1974–1976	Medical Center	Tom Evans / Weldman	2 episodes	
1975	Gunsmoke	Judge Flood	Episode: "Hard Labor"	
1975	Insight	Gus Mangel	Episode: "The Pendulum"	
1975	Bronk	Martin	Episode: "Terror"	
1975	Petrocelli	Dimitri	Episode: "Terror on Wheels"	
1975	Harry O	Walter Nesbitt	Episode: "The Madonna Legacy"	
1976	The Whiz Kid and the Carnival Caper	Moroni	Television film	
1976	The Wonderful World of Disney	Moroni	2 episodes	
1976	A Matter of Wife... and Death	Joe Ruby	Television film	
1977	The New Adventures of Wonder Woman	Ambassador Orrick	Episode: "The Queen and the Thief"	
1978	Switch	Gilchrist	Episode: "Coronado Circle"	
1978	Quincy, M.E.	Harlan Standish	Episode: "Gone But Not Forgotten"	
1978	The Six Million Dollar Man	General Norbukov	Episode: "The Moving Mountain"	
1978	The Bastard	Lord North	Television film	
1978	W.E.B.	Harry Brooks	2 episodes	
1978	The Hardy Boys/Nancy Drew Mysteries	Col. L. Morbius	Episode: "Search for Atlantis"	
1978	Saga of a Star World (Battlestar Galactica)	Count Baltar	Television film (148-minute pilot)	
1978–1979	Battlestar Galactica	Lord Baltar	21 episodes	
1979	Sergeant T.K. Yu	Gangster	Television film	
1979	Charlie's Angels	Anton Karazna	Episode: "Angel in a Box"	
1979	The Paradise Connection	Major Barclay-Battles	Television film	
1979	Vegas	Dr. Victor Durrand	Episode: "Dan Tanna Is Dead"	
1981	General Hospital	Mikkos Cassadine	Episode: #1.4715	
1984	The Yellow Rose	Nick Pappas	Episode: "Sport of Kings"	
1984	Scarecrow and Mrs. King	Ilya Kreschenko	Episode: "Playing Possum"	
1985	The Hitchhiker	Mr. Stregga	Episode: "Petty Thieves"	
1987	Street Legal	Farraday	Episode: "A Little Knowledge"	
1987	I'll Take Manhattan	banker, Lester Maypole	Television miniseries	
1987–1988	Night Heat	Karakonis / Lech Koretski	2 episodes	
1987–1989	Alfred Hitchcock Presents	Lestrade / Moriarty / Carter Talbot	2 episodes	
1989	War of the Worlds	Quinn	2 episodes	
1989	Love and Hate: The Story of Colin and JoAnn Thatcher	Serge Kujawa	Television film	
1990	In Defense of a Married Man	Charles Evers	Television film	
1991	E.N.G.	Lionel Hirsch	Episode: "Smoke and Mirrors"	
1992–1993	X-Men: The Animated Series	Apocalypse / En Sabah Nur (voice)	4 episodes	
1993	Beyond Reality	Sinclair	Episode: "Bloodstone"	
1993	Counterstrike	Vince Egan	Episode: "The Contender"	
1994–1998	Star Trek: Deep Space Nine	Kor	3 episodes	
1997	The Last Don	Eli Marrion	Television miniseries	
1997	Fast Track	Dr. Wallace Beckett	Episode: "Fathers & Sons"	
1997	Windsor Protocol	Gerhardt Heinzer / Albert Greenfield	Television film	
1998	Thunder Point	Heinzer	Television film	
1998	My Father's Shadow: The Sam Sheppard Story	Richard Eberling (in jail)	Television film	
