= Dakota Morton =

Canadian radio host (born 1988)

Dakota Morton (born June 12, 1988, in Canada) (also known as Cody) is known as the World's Youngest Radio Host. He created the record and set it on January 16, 1999 at the age of 10 years, 218 days. The record was awarded while Dakota was hosting his radio show at CJAV radio in Port Alberni.

Morton is now a professional film editor and received a 2022 Leo Award "Best Picture Editing Feature Length Documentary" for the documentary Precious Leader Woman.

== See also ==
- List of radio stations in British Columbia
