= Jacinta Cormier =

Canadian singer and actress

Jacinta Cormier, sometimes credited as Jace Cormier, is a Canadian singer and actress from Newfoundland and Labrador. She is most noted for her performance as Mary Cameron in the film Life Classes, for which she received a Genie Award nomination for Best Actress at the 9th Genie Awards in 1988.

Originally from Stephenville, Cormier was active on the music scene in St. John's as a pianist and vocalist, including with the Wonderful Grand Band, before being cast in Life Classes. She subsequently appeared in a supporting role in the film Finding Mary March, but returned to music and did not have any other significant film or television roles.

In 2001, she toured a stage show in which she played Marlene Dietrich; she also released her first album as a recording artist.
