= The Outside Chance of Maximilian Glick =

- Theatrical release poster
- Directed by: Allan A. Goldstein
- Screenplay by: Phil Savath
- Based on: The Outside Chance of Maximilian Glick by Morley Torgov
- Produced by: Richard Davis; Stephen Foster
- Starring: Jan Rubeš; Noam Zylberman; Aaron Schwartz; Saul Rubinek; Fairuza Balk
- Cinematography: Ian Elkin
- Edited by: Richard Martin
- Music by: Graeme Coleman
- Production company: National Film Board of Canada
- Distributed by: Alliance Films (Canada); Southgate Entertainment (International)
- Release date: 3 March 1989
- Running time: 97 minutes
- Country: Canada
- Language: English
- Budget: $2,354,900
- Box office: $179,981 (Canada)

The Outside Chance of Maximilian Glick is a 1988 Canadian film based on the novel by Morley Torgov. The film was shot in Winnipeg and Beausejour, Manitoba.

== Plot ==
The early 1960s: In preparation for his Bar Mitzvah, a Jewish boy from a small Manitoba community with an overbearing family tries to navigate his coming-of-age with his family's condescension and bigotry using his sarcastic Jewish humor. The town's rabbi dies, and a subplot develops in which Max's father and grandfather (synagogue leaders) are saddled with a traditional Hassidic rabbi who sticks out like a sore thumb among the otherwise assimilated Jewish community. To make matters more difficult, Max likes a Catholic girl, with whom he later duets in a piano competition. The quirky, fun-loving rabbi tries to help him with his problems, yet harbours a secret ambition of his own.

== Primary cast ==
- Noam Zylberman - Maximilian Glick
- Jan Rubeš - Augustus Glick
- Susan Douglas Rubeš - Bryna Glick
- Sharon Corder - Sarah Glick
- Aaron Schwartz - Henry Glick
- Howard Jerome - Zelig Peikes
- Nigel Bennett - Derek Blackthorn
- Fairuza Balk - Celia Brzjinski
- Saul Rubinek - Rabbi Teitelman

== Production ==
=== Development ===
In 1985, Stephen Foster was hired by Meta Communications, led by his friend Alan Morinis, to work as vice president of development for its production division, Northern Lights Media Corporation. Foster bought the film rights to Morley Torgov's novel The Outside Chance of Maximilian Glick for $25,000, but was unable to buy the television rights due to opposition from other members of Northern Lights Media Corporation.

Joe Wiesenfeld, the writer of the Canadian Broadcasting Corporation's adaption Anne of Green Gables, was asked to write the film, but he was involved with another project. Paul Shapiro was also asked, but Shapiro wanted to work on a feature film while Foster was planning The Outside Chance of Maximilian Glick to be a television film. Phil Savath was hired to write the script in June 1986, but was doubtful about the project due to Foster and his company's inexperience.

Savath wrote a treatment in two weeks and offered to write a first draft if further funds were raised for the film. Foster unsuccessfully sought funding from numerous groups, including the Jewish community of Vancouver. Don Smith, who worked at an affiliate of CTV News, gave the film $1,000 for its treatment, thousands for further script development, and a $11,000 equity position in the production financing. Telefilm Canada provided $5,000 in funding. Foster later sought a development budget of $50,000-60,000 which was funded by CBC, BCTV, and Telefilm.

Savath was shocked that the film received its funding and started writing the script in November 1986, and his first draft received positive reviews from friends in February 1987. Foster and Savath did not like the title of the film, but chose to retain it as their proposed titles of Red River Rabbi, Bar Mitzvah Boy, and Maximilian Glick and the Master of the Universe were not better.

=== Funding ===
The film cost $2,354,900. It was given a preliminary budget of $1.5 million, based on My American Cousin which Foster believed to be in similar scale, and cost $2,354,900 to make. Foster hired Richard Davis, a film producer from Australia who once headed the New South Wales film commission, to co-produce the film as he understood budgeting better. This was Davis' first film in Canada. Foster attempted to hire Peter O'Brian as an executive producer, but rejected O'Brian's creative demands.

Foster wanted the project to be a television film for the CBC, but CBC executives were opposed to the idea and requested a second draft before agreeing to a broadcast license pre-sale of $500,000. Foster wanted the pre-sale in order to apply for $725,000 from Telefilm's Broadcast Fund. John Kennedy, the head of drama at CBC, agreed to finance the film after a 15 minute meeting with Foster and Foster then received the funding from Telefilm. Foster attempted to obtain the remaining $250,000 needed from the Cultural Industries Development Office, but the organization's contribution was below its maximum of $300,000 and left Foster $75,000 below his target.

Linda Beath, the head of production at Telefilm, supported turning the project into a feature film. Telefilm's Broadcast Fund was running out of money while its fund with the National Film Board of Canada saw the project as a good candidate for funding. The film's budget was increased beyond its initial $1.5 million as Foster wanted to shoot in 35 mm instead of 16 mm. The NFB contributed $456,811 to the project and the B.C. Film Fund contributed $170,000, half of its equity in the film was sold to the Beacon Group.

The CBC opposed the project becoming a theatrical film and threatened to end its funding, but agreed to only reduce it to $250,000. The NFB demanded that it be given a lead credit against the wishes of Foster, but agreed to compromise with an "in association with" credit instead. Telefilm was going through budgetary problems at the time and froze all project funding resulting in Foster needing $50,000 to prevent suspending operations. Rudy Carter agreed to have the CBC give Foster the funds. B.C. Film and the NFB provided additional funding for until the beginning of Telefilm's next fascial year.

The budget of the film consisted of $1,153,000 in funding from Telefilm, $456,811 from the NFB, $250,000 from CBC, $245,000 from CIDO, $170,000 from B.C. Film, $68,188 in tax deferrals, and $11,000 from BCTV. It was the most expensive film made in Manitoba up to that point.

=== Casting and crew ===
Foster wanted Sheldon Larry to direct the film and talked to Larry about casting Robin Williams or Jeff Goldblum for the role of Rabbi Teitleman. However, Telefilm would not commit as much money if an American actor was cast. Foster offered the position of director to Shapiro, Sandy Wilson, and George Bloomfield. He sent Torgov's novel to Allan A. Goldstein, who liked it and requested to see Savath's script. Goldstein accepted the offer while filming for American Playhouse and was paid $100,000. This was the first feature film Goldstein directed. Davis later hired Goldstein to direct Chaindance.

Foster hired casting agent Arlene Berman and she was able to hire all of the actors on his list except for two. Foster rejected all of the child actors that auditioned for Max Glick as he wanted Seth Green to play the role. However, he was not allowed to hire Green as he was American and Noam Zylberman was selected instead.

Foster wanted Saul Rubinek to play Rabbi Teitelman, but auditioned other actors first. He sent the script to Rubinek, but told him that he was to audition for Max's father. Rubinek made multiple requests to play Teitleman, but Foster declined to answer them in order to gain negotiating leverage. Rubinek agreed to play the role for $25,000 despite protests from his agent Ralph Zimmerman.

The film was edited by Richard Martin.

=== Filming ===
The film was shot in Winnipeg and Beausejour, Manitoba over the course of five weeks from November to December 1987. Eight indoor sets were built in an abandoned Winnipeg apartment, which the production managed to delay from being turned into an urban housing project. Foster and Davis used a local non-union crew in accordance with the agreement with CIDO.

Ian Elkin, who had never worked on a feature film, was originally selected as Director of Photography by Foster. Goldstein wanted Elkin replaced, but CIDO refused stating that a Manitoban was required for the position. Goldstein had a poor relationship with the crew with Davis stating that "Allan's not the most balanced of people" and that the "crew thought he was somewhere to the right of Attila the Hun". Goldstein punched his fist through a wall at one point during production.

Synagogue and piano competition scenes were filmed at the Baha'i Temple of Winnipeg.

Outdoor shooting had to be delayed due to a lack of snow in December resulting in indoor scenes being filmed first and some outdoor scenes being turned into indoor scenes. Savath considered changing the film from Christmas to Easter. The production planned on delaying filming until January, but it started snowing one day before production was meant to stop.

The film was subsequently adapted into the CBC Television comedy-drama series Max Glick.

== Release ==
Foster first asked Northstar, headed by his friend Daniel Weinzweig, to distribute the film, but Weinzweig believed the film was better on television. Foster sold the Canadian distribution rights to René Malo's Malofilm for $250,000. However, Foster later decided that he needed a different distributor as "Malo kept sending these bizarrely Draconian contracts". A fine-cut screening of the film at Famous Players received unanimous praise except from the Malo representatives. Telefilm allowed Foster to end the distribution contract with Malofilm.

The film was shown at the 1988 Toronto Festival of Festivals. The distribution rights were sold to Alliance Films for a minimum of $250,000 after this screening. Alliance spent $100,000 advertising the film, including $10,000 spent on the film's trailer.

The Outside Chance of Maximilian Glick premiered in Winnipeg on 3 March 1989. Alliance did not want to open in Winnipeg as it felt it was too small, but Foster supported the decision. Foster stated that the premiere had "the deadest audience" and was mainly seen by local politicians. It was released in Toronto and Vancouver on 10 March. Foster stated that Cineplex Entertainment promised them multiple theatres in Toronto, but the film was only shown in one. Foster lobbied for the film to be shown in Vancouver's Jewish district as its original location would hurt the film. The film was released in Montreal on 19 May, and earned $40,106 during its theatrical run in the city. The film earned $179,981 in Canada after it was shown in Toronto for twelve weeks, Montreal for ten weeks, and Vancouver for six weeks.

Foster wanted The Samuel Goldwyn Company to distribute the film in the United States and hired Linda Beath, a former Telefilm employee, to shop the distribution rights around. Foster formed his own company, Fosterfilm, in 1989, leaving the foreign distribution rights to Northern Lights. Goldstein stated Davis and Foster "dropped the ball on the U.S. release" as according to him New Line Cinema, The Samuel Goldwyn Company, Orion Classics, and other companies made offers for the rights after the Toronto Festival of Festivals showing. International Movie Group gained the distribution rights after acquiring Northern Lights in 1989.

The United States and Israeli distribution rights were sold to South Gate Entertainment. The film performed poorly during test marketing in San Francisco. South Gate Entertainment lacked enough money for a proper theatrical run and later filed for Chapter 11 bankruptcy and instead did a home video release. A theatrical run lasted in the Miami and Fort Lauderdale area for twenty-two weeks.

== Reception ==
The film received mixed reviews. Variety's review stated that "Stereotypes never get out of the box in this slight, small-town comedy". Rick Groen, writing in The Globe and Mail, stated that the film was a "sweetly comic ode to the virtues of middle class life". Brian D. Johnson, writing in Maclean's, stated that the film was full of "brotherhood themes too cutely portrayed".

== Accolades ==
| Award | Date of ceremony | Category | Recipient(s) | Result | Ref. |
|---|---|---|---|---|---|
| Toronto Festival of Festivals | 8-17 September 1988 | Best Canadian Film | The Outside Chance of Maximilian Glick | Won | |
| Fort Lauderdale Film Festival | | Best Film | The Outside Chance of Maximilian Glick | Won | |
| Genie Awards | 22 March 1989 | Best Picture | The Outside Chance of Maximilian Glick | Nominated | |
| Genie Awards | 22 March 1989 | Best Actor | Saul Rubinek | Nominated | |
| Genie Awards | 22 March 1989 | Best Supporting Actress | Susan Douglas Rubeš | Nominated | |
| Genie Awards | 22 March 1989 | Best Adapted Screenplay | Phil Savath | Nominated | |
| Genie Awards | 22 March 1989 | Best Costume Design | Charlotte Penner | Nominated | |

== Works cited ==
- Posner, Michael (1993). Canadian Dreams: The Making and Marketing of Independent Films. Canadian Independent Film Caucus. ISBN 1550541145.
