= Communication Canada =

Communication Canada was an agency of the Department of Public Works and Government Services in the Government of Canada. Its responsibility was primarily for keeping federal government departments and their agencies connected with Canadian citizens. Responsibility for developing the federal government's web presence and primary web site rested with Communication Canada.

The agency was created in the mid-1990s following the 1995 Quebec referendum, ostensibly to promote federal government communications with all of Canada; however, many Canadians viewed it as a government propaganda agency. Communication Canada became linked to the Sponsorship Scandal and was disbanded in a federal government reorganization at the end of the fiscal year, effective March 31, 2004.

Communication Canada was accountable to its executive director, who reported to the chair of the Cabinet Committee on Government Communications and there was a Minister Responsible for Communication Canada. On April 1, 2004, the agency was disbanded and its responsibilities divided among the Department of Public Works and Government Services and the Privy Council Office.

Communications Canada was created in 1969 as the Department of Communications and was headed by the Minister of Communications. It was disbanded in 1995 with its responsibilities for telecommunications going to Industry Canada and culture going to Canadian Heritage.
