= Finding Mary March =

1988 Canadian drama film

- Directed by: Ken Pittman
- Written by: Ken Pittman
- Produced by: Ken Pittman; Rob Iveson; Stirling Norris; John Harris
- Starring: Rick Boland; Jacinta Cormier; Yvon Joe; Tara Manual; Andrée Pelletier
- Cinematography: Michael Jones
- Edited by: Derek Norman
- Music by: Pamela Morgan; Paul Steffler
- Production company: Marchco Films Limited
- Release date: August 31, 1988
- Running time: 100 minutes
- Country: Canada
- Language: English

Finding Mary March is a 1988 Canadian film, written and directed by Ken Pittman. A historical drama, the film discusses the search for the last remains of Demasduit (Mary March), one of the last of the Beothuk people, set in the Beothuk Lake (then known as "Red Indian Lake") area of Central Newfoundland. A young girl, Bernadette Buchans, believes that she is related to Mary March. Throughout the film, Bernadette and her father Ted are searching for the grave of her mother. An archaeologist/photographer, Nancy George, accompanies them; she also believes that she has family connections to the Beothuk.

== Plotline ==
Nancy George, a new character, is accompanied by some big city folk while flying in a helicopter. They discuss Nancy's purpose of coming to town and her desire to photograph Beothuk burial sites. Nancy notifies the others of her belief that there are still some important archeological remains in the place and that a mine should not be opened in risk of destroying the lost heritage of the Beothuk. Next, we are introduced to Ted and Bernadette as they canoe along the river, a tourist discovers an arrowhead along the shore as Ted notices this he aims his rifle at him, he drops the arrow head and quickly runs into the woods. They continue to row along the river.

The next morning Nancy wakes to find Bernadette has taken the piece of pendant and broken the board from the Indian boy. Nancy tells Ted that Bernadette has taken it. Ted becomes very angry and asks Nancy if she would "let someone open [her] mother’s coffin and take her wedding ring." Nancy tells him she did it to understand, explaining the relation of Mi'Kmaq and Beothuk written language. Nancy believes this may be the lost key of the written language of the Beothuk. Ted leaves without saying anything.

Nancy gets aboard the helicopter and Ted asks her where she is going from here, she says she is going to get a new lens and is going to come back and finish what she started. Ted tells her he will finish it too. The helicopter leaves and Ted and Bernadette rebury Mary March.

== Cast ==
=== Main cast ===
- Rick Boland - Ted Buchans
- Jacinta Cormier - Mary March
- Yvon Joe - Micmac Boy
- Tara Manual - Bernadette Buchans
- Andrée Pelletier - Nancy George

== Production crew ==
=== Producers ===
- John Harris - Executive Producer
- Stirling Norris - Executive Producer
- Rob Iveson - Producer
- Ken Pittman - Producer

=== Original music ===
- Pamela Morgan
- Paul Steffler

=== Cinematography ===
- Michael Jones

=== Film editing ===
- Derek Norman

== Reception ==
Finding Mary March was released on August 31, 1988, being played at select theatres and film festivals across Canada. Though not gaining much of a following or popularity, the film was success among certain Canadian film critics and received good reviews. Canadian film critic Patrick Keans gave the film a lengthy and positive review in film review newspaper Cinema Canada. Keans describes Finding Mary March as a "spiritual film" saying, "(Director) Pittman’s attempts to answer compelling questions about how we act integrate many ways of knowing and we can't help but know a little more after watching and listening to Finding Mary March".
