= Canadian Centre on Substance Abuse Act =

1988 Government of Canada legislation

Parliament of Canada
- Long title: An Act to establish the Canadian Centre on Substance Abuse
- Citation: Canadian Centre on Substance Abuse Act
- Enacted by: Parliament of Canada
- Assented to: September 13, 1988
- Commenced: November 1, 1988
- Status: In force

The Canadian Centre on Substance Abuse Act (French: Loi sur le Centre canadien de lutte contre les toxicomanies) is Government of Canada legislation signed into law on September 13, 1988. The purpose of the Act is to establish the Canadian Centre on Substance Abuse (now the Canadian Centre on Substance Use and Addiction), recognized as a charity, for the purposes of the Income Tax Act, overseen by Health Canada. The Centre's purpose is to promote increased awareness on the part of Canadians of matters relating to alcohol and drug abuse and their increased participation in the reduction of harm associated with such abuse, and to promote the use and effectiveness of programs of excellence that are relevant to alcohol and drug abuse by:

(a) promoting and supporting consultation and co-operation among governments, the business community and labour, professional and voluntary organizations in matters relating to alcohol and drug abuse;

(b) contributing to the effective exchange of information on alcohol and drug abuse;

(c) facilitating and contributing to the development and application of knowledge and expertise in the alcohol and drug abuse field;

(d) promoting and assisting in the development of realistic and effective policies and programs aimed at reducing the harm associated with alcohol and drug abuse; and

(e) promoting increased awareness among Canadians of the nature and extent of international efforts to reduce alcohol and drug abuse and supporting Canada's participation in those efforts.

The organization is overseen by a board of directors consisting of a director and other members, appointed by the Governor-General in Council.
