= Shadow Dancing (film) =

- Directed by: Lewis Furey
- Written by: Christine Foster
- Produced by: Kay Sumner; Don Haig
- Starring: Nadine Van der Velde; James Kee; John Colicos; Shirley Douglas; Gregory Osborne; Brent Carver; Christopher Plummer
- Cinematography: Rene Ohashi
- Edited by: James Lahti
- Music by: Jay Gruska
- Production company: Cineplex Odeon Films
- Distributed by: Shapiro-Glickenhaus Entertainment
- Release date: September 12, 1988
- Running time: 100 minutes
- Country: Canada
- Language: English

Shadow Dancing is a 1988 thriller film directed by Lewis Furey and starring Nadine Van der Velde and Christopher Plummer.

The film premiered at the 1988 Festival of Festivals, before going into commercial release in December 1988.

== Plot ==
Jess is a struggling dancer trying to land a dream role in musical about Medusa. As she practices, the director, who has been haunted for decades by the memory of his former dancer and lover, notices how much she resembles his former lover. The ballerina had died in a bizarre on-stage accident 50 years ago while performing exactly the same dance that Jess is doing. As Jess becomes more obsessed with winning the part she slowly takes on the physical and emotional characteristics of the woman. Eerily, as more unexplainable coincidences continue to surround the production.

== Cast ==
- Christopher Plummer as Edmund Beaumont
- Nadine Van der Velde as Jessica "Jess" Lilliane
- James Kee as Paul
- Gregory Osborne as Philip Crest
- John Colicos as Anthony Podopolis
- Charmion King as Grace Meyerhoff
- Shirley Douglas as Nicole
- Kay Tremblay as Sophie Beaumont
- Brent Carver as Alexei
- Jennifer Inch as Karen
- Sandi McCarthy as Patricia
- Patric A. Creelman as Charles
- Craig Hempsted as Matt
- Marcia Plummer as Judy
- Sergio Trujillo as Sam
- Claire Ann Gironella as Lisa
- Rene Carlisle as Young Anthony Podopolis
- Joseph Caporale as Emma
- Anthony Caporale as Emma
- Michael Caporale as Emma
- Adrian Foster as ASM #1
- Jennifer Graham as ASM #2
- Richard Greenblatt as Barman
- Kenneth McGregor as Johnny (as Ken McGregor)

== Critical response ==
Isabel Vincent of The Globe and Mail reviewed the film negatively, writing that "Besides an incredibly weird and awkward plot that has Van Der Velde stumbling through two totally disparate characters and time sequences followed by a parrot, the film lacks energy and that redeeming quality: good dance. The National Ballet's Gregory Osborne, who plays a temperamental choreographer (everyone in this film is temperamental - after all, they're artistes) has the best dance sequence, but it's hopelessly short and comes toward the end of the film. Osborne is cast in a bland role and turns in a clumsy performance as a hip Toronto choreographer infatuated with the spirit of La Nuit."

Allyson Latta of the Ottawa Citizen described the film as a cross between Fame and The Phantom of the Opera "with a touch of Raising Arizona thrown in for the baby-boomers in the audience", but ultimately concluded that "despite moments of promise, Shadow Dancing's obsession with chasing shadows of multiple genres prevents it from developing a character of its own."

Fred Haeseker of the Calgary Herald wrote that "The mouldy story and the bad acting aren't compensated for in the music or the dancing, neither of which is memorable enough to linger beyond the movie's end. In its worst moments Shadow Dancing looks like an amateur production, with the cast members costumed to the nines and giving their eager best to lines like, 'There's an infectious charm about a woman who lives each moment as if it were going to be her last.' If there is, the film certainly doesn't show it."

== Accolades ==
The film received three Genie Award nominations at the 10th Genie Awards in 1989, for Best Cinematography (René Ohashi), Best Costume Design (Maya Mani) and Best Original Song (Jay Gruska and Marc Jordan for "Shadow Dance").
