= Blizzard Island =

Canadian television series

Blizzard Island is a television show consisting of twelve episodes produced by CBC between 1988–1989. These episodes were later edited together to form the 1992 movie The Argon Quest.

== History ==
The Canadian children's television program "Blizzard Island" was created by Terry Angus and Stoney Ripley from Nova Scotia. The original story was written by the two in high school as an English project. Once out of high school they shot a homemade version of the show using a video camera bought by Angus with money from working on Jim Henson's "Fraggle Rock" in Toronto. Eventually they scored a deal with Studio East Limited in Halifax and two pilots were produced. Having liked the two pilots the CBC ordered up twelve more episodes which were shot in 1988 in conjunction with Studio East and Telefilm Canada. The show fell victim to budget cuts at the CBC and failed to return despite better than average ratings in Canada. In 1990 several episodes from the series were pieced together to form the movie The Argon Quest.

Right now Terry Angus is trying to find out if any one still owns the rights to Blizzard Island.

As of May, 2020, the Encore+ Youtube channel featured all 12 episodes of Blizzard Island. These became unavailable with the shutdown of the Encore Youtube channels on November 30, 2022.

Angus and Ripley went on to work together on the projects "Four Fish Fly Free" in Manhattan Kansas and "Tooth And Claw" also out of Halifax Nova Scotia

Blizzard Island Episodes SEASON ONE 1988/89

Episode One: Of Necklaces & Things

Episode Two: The Battlefield Of The Gods

Episode Three: Dune Da-Dune Dune Day

Episode Four: Crystals In A Darkling Wood

Episode Five: The Secret Of The Sirens Song

Episode Six: The Bellringers Of Argon

Episode Seven: In The Heart Of The Heart Of The Stone

Episode Eight: By The Night Of THe Covered Sun

Episode Nine: The Legend Of The Last Leaf

Episode Ten: The River Of The Distant Thunder

Episode Eleven: The Vale Of Fears

Episode Twelve: When Giants Wake
