= Rick Boland =

Richard Michael Boland (August 7, 1953 – January 30, 2024) was a Newfoundland actor, director, and activist.

== Early life and education ==
Richard Michael Francis Peter Aloysius Boland was born in Curling, Newfoundland. His family later relocated to Corner Brook, where he joined the improvisational group Youtheatre.

In 1971, Boland enrolled at Memorial University of Newfoundland to study cultural anthropology and became active in the university's Drama Society. He left his degree program to tour with the Newfoundland Travelling Theatre Company before joining the Mummers Troupe.

== Career ==
With the Mummers Troupe, Boland participated in the creation and touring of collective productions that addressed local issues, including Buchans a Mining Town, Gros Mourn, and What's That Got To Do With the Price of Fish? During the early 1980s, he worked with the Resource Centre for the Arts to develop plays based on oral histories, such as Terras de Bacalhau and Makin' Time With the Yanks, for which he archived interview and script materials.

In 1978, Boland co-founded Rising Tide Theatre with Donna Butt, David Ross, and others. He was a regular performer in the company's annual political satire, Revue, which began in 1984. He also co-authored the New Founde Land Trinity Pageant, a historical walking tour in Trinity created in response to the 1992 cod moratorium to promote cultural tourism. The production's success supported the establishment of Rising Tide’s summer theatre season in the town.

Boland's film credits include Finding Mary March, Extraordinary Visitor, and The Divine Ryans. His television appearances included roles in Yarns From Pigeon Inlet, Up at Ours, and the series Hatching, Matching and Dispatching.

== Activism and archival work ==
Boland was involved in political and social activism. A supporter of the New Democratic Party (NDP), he served as a campaign manager and was a candidate for the party in provincial by-elections in 2003 and 2007. He was also active with the LGBTQ community, the Native Friendship Centre (now First Light), and the Newfoundland and Labrador AIDS Committee.

In 1982, Boland co-founded the Newfoundland Performing Arts and Archives Project at Memorial University. In 2009, he was inducted into the Newfoundland and Labrador Arts Council Hall of Honour.
