= Jan Rubeš =

Czech-Canadian opera singer, actor (1920–2009)

Jan Rubeš CM
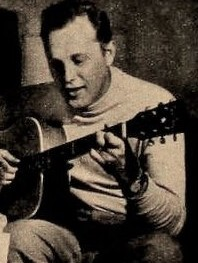
- Born: Jan Ladislav Rubeš; 6 June 1920; Volyně, Czechoslovakia
- Died: 29 June 2009 (aged 89); Toronto, Ontario, Canada
- Occupations: Actor, opera singer
- Years active: 1935–2006
- Spouse: Susan Douglas Rubeš (m. 1950)
- Children: 3

Jan Ladislav Rubeš CM (6 June 1920 – 29 June 2009) was a Czech-Canadian bass opera singer and actor.

== Life and career ==
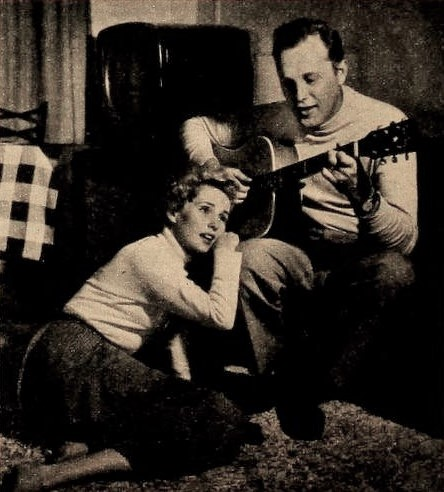
Susan Douglas and Jan Rubeš singing Czech folk songs, 1953

Rubeš was born in Volyně, Czechoslovakia, to Ružena (née Kellnerová) and Jan Rubeš. Not long after World War II, he graduated from the Prague Conservatoire and joined the Prague Opera House as a bass singer. In 1948, he won first prize at the Geneva International Music Festival and emigrated to Canada at the end of the year to pursue a career in a wider sphere. Beginning as a singer with the Canadian Opera Company, he subsequently directed and became director of touring, before switching to radio and television, where he became well known as an actor and presenter in Canada. He is noted for his portrayal of Amish patriarch Eli Lapp in Peter Weir's major-market film Witness and Jan in D2: The Mighty Ducks.

== Family ==
On 22 September 1950, Rubeš married actress Susan Douglas. The couple had three sons: Christopher (died 1996), Jonathan, and Anthony. They remained married until his death in 2009. He is the great-uncle of Czech YouTuber Janek Rubeš.

== Death ==
On 29 June 2009, Rubeš died following a stroke at Toronto General Hospital.

== Awards and recognition ==
- 1989: nominee, 10th Genie Awards, Best Actor, Something About Love
- 1990: winner, Earle Grey Award
- 1995: appointed Member, Order of Canada

== Filmography ==
=== Motion pictures ===
- 1950: Forbidden Journey - Jan Bartik
- 1963: The Incredible Journey - Carl Nurmi
- 1975: Lions for Breakfast - Ivan
- 1980: Mr. Patman - Vrakettas
- 1981: The Amateur - Kaplan
- 1981: Your Ticket Is No Longer Valid - Psychiatrist
- 1983: Utilities - Mort
- 1985: Witness - Eli Lapp
- 1985: One Magic Christmas - Santa Claus
- 1987: Dead of Winter - Dr. Joseph Lewis
- 1988: Blood Relations - Andreas
- 1988: The Outside Chance of Maximilian Glick - Augustus Glick
- 1988: The Kiss - Gordon Tobin
- 1988: Something About Love - Stan Olynyk
- 1989: The Experts - Illyich
- 1989: Cold Front - Zoubov
- 1989: Blind Fear - Lasky
- 1990: Divided Loyalties
- 1990: Courage Mountain - Grandfather
- 1990: The Amityville Curse - Priest
- 1991: Class Action - Pavel
- 1991: Deceived - Tomasz
- 1991: On My Own - The Colonel
- 1992: Don Gio - Journalist No. 2
- 1994: Boozecan - Pops
- 1994: D2: The Mighty Ducks - Jan
- 1994: Mesmer - Prof. Stoerk
- 1995: Roommates - Bolek Krupa
- 1996: Never Too Late - Joseph
- 1997: Bach Cello Suite #4: Sarabande - Dr. Kassovitz
- 1998: Music from Another Room - Louis Klammer
- 1998: The White Raven - Markus Strand
- 1999: Snow Falling on Cedars - Ole Jurgensen
- 1999: Nightmare Man - Evan Hannibal
- 2000: Believe - Jason Stiles
- 2001: Anthrax - Arthur Kowalski
- 2002: The Burial Society - Marvin Telekunsky
- 2003: The Republic of Love - Strom
- 2004: Daniel and the Superdogs - The Colonel

=== Television movies ===
- 1975: Deadly Harvest
- 1977: The Day My Granddad Died
- 1978: Catsplay
- 1985: Charlie Grant's War - Jacob
- 1985: Murder by Reason of Insanity - Giorgi Denerenko
- 1986: The Marriage Bed - Max Ehrlich
- 1988: No Blame - Dr. Bloomer
- 1988: Two Men - Michael Barna
- 1990: Descending Angel - Bishop Dancu
- 1992: Devlin - Vittorio Di Fabrizi
- 1993: Coming of Age - Tomas Havel
- 1994: The Birds II: Land's End - Karl
- 1994: Lamb Chop in the Haunted Studio - Phantom
- 1995: Serving in Silence: The Margarethe Cammermeyer Story - Far
- 1997: Flood: A River's Rampage
- 1999: What Katy Did - Dr. Reinhart
- 2000: The Christmas Secret - Andree
- 2005: Our Fathers - Pope John Paul

=== Television series ===
- 1963: The Forest Rangers - Jaworski / Gregor Kowalski
- 1970: Castle Zaremba - Col. Kazimir Zaremba
- 1970: The Barbara McNair Show - Himself
- 1983: Vandenberg - Lewis Vanderberg
- 1975–1983: Guess What (host)
- 1985: Kane & Abel (miniseries) - The Polish Consul
- 1985: Murder in Space - Gregory Denarenko
- 1986: Kay O'Brien - Dr. Josef Wallach
- 1986: Crossings (miniseries) - Isaac Zimmerman
- 1988: Sharon, Lois & Bram's Elephant Show (as a special guest) - Jan Rubes
- 1989: The Beachcombers (Episode, "A Bearish Market") - Brink
- 1989: War of the Worlds - (Episode, "Choirs of Angels") - Dr. Erik von Deer
- 1990: Street Legal (season 4, Episode 4X13 "Leon's Story") - Arthur Robinovitch
- 1990: Max Glick - Augustus Glick
- 1992–1993: By Way of the Stars (miniseries) - Hausierer Nathan
- 1996: The X-Files (Episodes Tunguska [uncredited] and Terma) - Vassily Peskow
- 1996–1998: Due South - Dr. Mort Gustafson
- 1997: The Third Twin (miniseries)
- 1999: The Outer Limits (Episode, "Tribunal") - Robert Greene / Older Karl Rademacher
- 2000: Stargate SG-1 (season 3, Episode 21 "Crystal Skull") - Nicholas Ballard
