= Walking After Midnight (1988 film) =

- Directed by: Jonathan Kay
- Starring: Ringo Starr (narration)
- Release date: 1988
- Running time: 92 mins
- Country: Canada

Walking After Midnight is a 1988 Canadian documentary film directed by Jonathan Kay. It screened in the Perspectives Canada section of the Toronto Festival of Festivals in late 1988. The film features celebrities from film and music, as well as the Dalai Lama, discussing reincarnation and speculating on their past lives. Narrated by Ringo Starr, it includes appearances by Martin Sheen, James Coburn, k.d. lang, Willie Nelson, Donovan, Catherine Oxenberg, Rae Dawn Chong and Helen Shaver.

The stories are supported by musical accompaniment and partly told through re-enactments. Sheen recalls a near-death experience he had while filming Apocalypse Now in the 1970s, and Lang asserts that in a past life she was country singer Patsy Cline.
