= The New Quiz Kids =

Canadian quiz show

The New Quiz Kids is a Canadian television series, based on the 1950s game show Quiz Kids. Two separate seasons were produced in Canada in 1978-1979 by the Global Television Network in association with RKO Television and Columbia Pictures.

Episodes were rebroadcast several times in the following seasons. The host was Terry David Mulligan. Five high school students competed in each episode, with the top three earning the right to continue. Michael Mullerbeck of University of Toronto Schools made the most appearances (33), followed by Bettina Weber (22), of Silverthorn CI, and John Chew (11), also of UTS.
