= Frank Cole (filmmaker) =

Canadian filmmaker (1954–2000)

- Born: 1954; Saskatchewan, Canada
- Died: 2000 (aged 45–46)
- Occupation: Filmmaker
- Years active: 1979-2000
- Known for: A Documentary and A Life

Frank Cole (1954 – 2000) was a Canadian filmmaker who became the first North American to cross the Sahara alone on camel from the Atlantic Ocean to the Red Sea, in 1990. This voyage earned Cole an entry in the Guinness Book of World Records. His documentary Life Without Death chronicled his experience and won him several awards as well as being released theatrically in Paris. Cole was murdered by bandits near Timbuktu, Mali, in late October 2000.

== Early life and career ==
Born in Saskatchewan to a New Brunswick father from the diplomatic field and a lawyer mother. Cole grew up in Pakistan, Afghanistan, Czechoslovakia, Switzerland and South Africa. A well-educated traveller, he studied languages at Carleton University and later film production at Algonquin College in Ottawa. His films include A Documentary (1979), The Mountenays (1981), A Life (1986) and Life Without Death (2000).

== 1990 journey across the Sahara ==
Cole managed to cross the Sahara Desert alone on camel, the first North American to do so. The journey took more than 11 months and covered 7,300 km, Cole travelled through Mauritania, Mali, Niger, Chad and Sudan, often passing through civil or tribal war zones, his journey ending at the Red Sea. Cole earned a place in the Guinness Book of Records. Footage from this journey was used in his critically acclaimed documentary Life Without Death.

== 2000 return journey and murder ==
In 2000, Cole returned to cross the Sahara again; this time his plan was to cross and then return from the Red Sea back to the Atlantic Ocean. In October 2000, he left Timbuktu for Gao on the sand track known as Autoroute Nationale. He arrived in Ber and departed eastwards after speaking with the Malian Gendarmerie.

Cole was killed by bandits.

His killing included the theft of most of his exposed film recordings and camera gear. The last images of his last trip were filmed in Mauritania and shipped back to his family in Ottawa where they now rest. His camels, bought and tattooed in Mauritania, have never been found.

His remains are thought to have been cryonically preserved at the Michigan Cryonics Institute.
