= Tom Berry (filmmaker) =

Canadian businessman and filmmaker

Tom Berry is a Canadian businessman, film producer, and screenwriter known for founding and scaling several entertainment and real estate ventures. He is the founder of Reel One Entertainment and Champlain Media, both of which have become prominent producers and distributors of television content worldwide. Berry is also active in real estate through Irwell Properties Ltd. and the Berry Family Office.

== Early career ==
Berry began his career in the 1980s as a screenwriter and director. His film credits include Crazy Moon (starring Kiefer Sutherland), Never Too Late (starring Olympia Dukakis), Screamers (distributed by Columbia Tri-Star), The Assignment (featuring Aidan Quinn, Donald Sutherland, and Ben Kingsley), and The Unsaid (starring Andy Garcia). While his early work established him as a creative professional, he transitioned into entrepreneurial and executive roles within the media industry.

== Business ventures ==
In 1985, Berry co-founded Allegro Films, which grew into one of Canada’s leading entertainment companies, with operations in production, distribution, and technical services. The company was acquired by Groupe Québecor in 1997.

In 2002, Berry founded Reel One Entertainment (also known as Première Bobine), focusing on the financing, production, and global distribution of television movies. Under his leadership, the company established offices in Los Angeles, London, Vancouver, and Toronto. Reel One was later acquired by Studio TF1 (a division of the French TF1 Group) and A+E Networks. Berry remains involved with the company as a board member and chairman.

In 2019, Berry co-founded Champlain Media, which has become a key player in the production and distribution of TV movies and series in Canada. The company specializes in romantic comedies, holiday-themed films, and thrillers.

Throughout his career, Berry has produced or executive-produced over 662 films and has been recognized for his expertise in deal-making, market expansion, and strategic partnerships.

== Industry involvement and recognition ==
Berry served as chairman of the Canadian Film and Television Production Association (CFTPA) from 1995 to 1997. He has also contributed to various charitable initiatives and supported organizations focused on homelessness, housing, and medical service delivery.

He is a recipient of the Jack Chisholm Award for Entrepreneurial Excellence, recognizing his impact on the Canadian entertainment industry.

== Real estate and private investment ==
Berry currently operates Irwell Properties Ltd., a real estate investment firm based in Manchester, United Kingdom, and the Berry Family Office, headquartered in Montreal, Quebec. Both entities focus on investments in multi-unit residential real estate—Irwell Properties Ltd. in the UK and Berry Family Office in Canada. Berry’s interest in real estate began while studying film at Concordia University, where he managed rental properties to fund his early film projects.
