= Alexander Tilley =

Canadian entrepreneur (1938–2025)

Alex Tilley
- Born: Alexander Joseph Tilley; January 8, 1938; Mount Albert, Ontario, Canada
- Died: October 28, 2025 (aged 87); Muskoka, Ontario, Canada
- Education: University of British Columbia (BA)
- Years active: 1980–2015
- Spouse: Hilary Clark Cole (m. 2008)
- Children: 4

Alexander Joseph Tilley (January 8, 1938 – October 28, 2025) was a Canadian entrepreneur and philanthropist known for founding hat manufacturer Tilley Endurables in 1984. After selling the company in 2015, he focused on supporting various charitable causes and supporting young business owners.

== Early life and education ==
Born in Mount Albert, Ontario, Tilley spent his childhood in nearby Kitchener, where he had his first entrepreneurial experience reselling pumpkins door-to-door. At age 12, Tilley suffered a head injury in a car accident, leading to ongoing memory issues. Upon moving to Sudbury in his teens, Tilley began sailing regularly.

At the recommendation of his father, Tilley obtained bachelor's degrees in Economics and Psychology from the University of British Columbia and took a job at Bell Canada. After 30 days, Tilley left to pursue his own ventures. After moving to Toronto, Tilley launched Fine Art Consultants of Canada, working to connect artists with corporate customers.

== Tilley Endurables ==
Tilley's position as an art dealer left him time to continue enjoying his hobbies, particularly sailing, travelling, and photography. During this time, he grew increasingly frustrated with the unavailability of a suitable sailing hat, and in 1980 he worked with a milliner to create a new hat to address the issues present in existing ones. The new hat was water and mildew resistant, could float, and featured a fisherman's knot to secure the hat to the head of the wearer. After initially selling the hats from home, Tilley saw demand increase and began bringing them to boat shows. At the request of his customers, Tilley also introduced product lines of shorts and pants designed for sailing, before expanding to a variety of other travel apparel and accessories. In 1984, he left his job and created Tilley Endurables, a company specializing in durable and lightweight travel gear.

Tilley met his fourth wife, Hilary Clark Cole, in 1993, when he purchased a large moose statue from her. They married in 2008.
