= Any Woman Can (TV series) =

- Genre: home improvement
- Presented by: Monica Parker
- Country of origin: Canada
- Original language: English

Production
- Producers: Kay Benko; Ken Benko
- Running time: 30 minutes

Original release
- Network: CTV
- Release: October 1974 – September 1975

Any Woman Can is a Canadian home improvement television series which aired on CTV between October 1974 and September 1975. Hosted by Monica Parker, the show featured home repair tips for homemakers such as small machine repairs.
