= Susan Douglas Rubeš =

Austrian-Canadian actress, producer (1925–2013)

Susan Douglas Rubeš CM
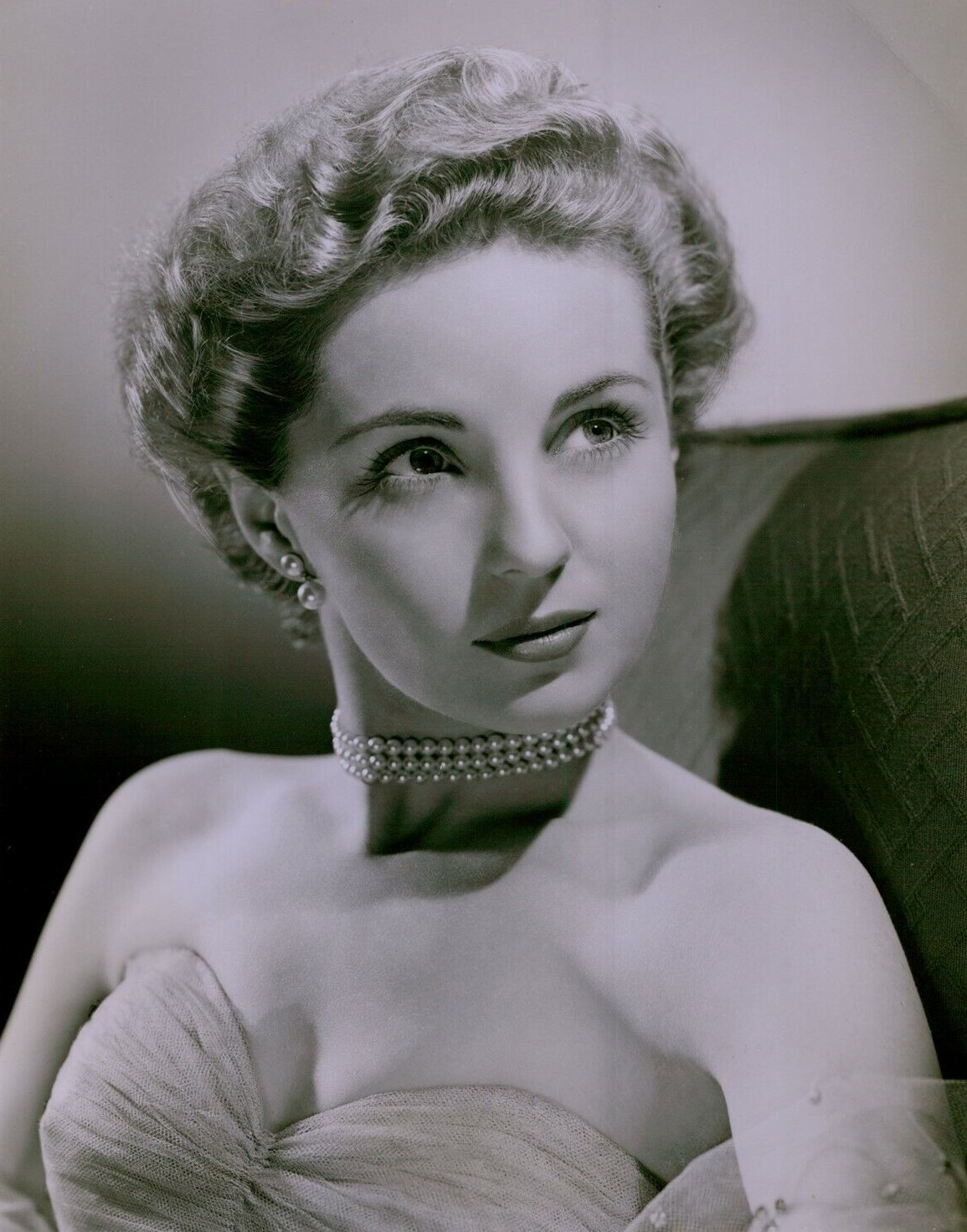
- Susan Douglas Rubeš in 1951
- Born: Zuzka Zenta Bursteinová; March 13, 1925; Vienna, Austria
- Died: January 23, 2013 (aged 87); Ontario, Canada
- Other name: Suzi Burstein
- Occupations: Actor, Film producer
- Years active: 1947-1999
- Spouse: Jan Rubeš (m. 1950; died 2009)
- Children: 3

Susan Douglas Rubeš CM (13 March 1925 – 23 January 2013) was an Austrian-born Canadian actress and producer. She was sometimes credited as Susan Douglas or Susan Rubes.

== Life and career ==
Rubeš was born Zuzka Zenta Bursteinová in Vienna, Austria, the only child of Charlotte and Alfred Burstein. Her family was Jewish. When Zuzka was a child, her parents moved to a farm in Czechoslovakia, where they bred race horses. Her family took her to the theater or opera in Brno, and, on occasion, would visit Zuzka's maternal grandmother in Vienna, the manager of the Burgtheater. She began studying ballet at the age of eight. In 1939, Alfred and Charlotte moved to Paris to escape the German invasion, and a year later, Zuzka and her mother moved to the United States to escape the war in Europe, three months before the Germans invaded Paris. Emigration to the U.S. was allowed on the basis of annual quotas. Charlotte was allowed in the country on the basis of her birth in Italy, as Italy's quota had not been filled for that year. Alfred Burstein moved to London to work for the Czechoslovak government-in-exile.

As Charlotte was not happy in her marriage, she arranged a divorce in absentia in Las Vegas and married Edward Weinberger, an agriculturalist. Zuzka learned English (her fourth language) by watching three movies a day. Under the name Suzi Burstein, she attended George Washington High School in New York City. After graduating in 1943, she changed her name to Susan Douglas. Her first name, Zuzka, is Czech for Susan, while she selected Douglas from a phone book.

Beginning in 1945, she began a career spanning radio, television, theater and film; she was both an actress and producer. Her 1947 movie debut was in The Private Affairs of Bel Ami. Following the film, she was offered a standard seven-year contract by Albert Lewin of MGM, but turned it down to live in New York. Between 1946 and 1959, she appeared on hundreds of television shows, including both the radio and TV versions of The Guiding Light. As her character was unmarried, and Douglas was pregnant three times during her appearance on The Guiding Light, the producer had her character sick and in an oxygen tent for the first child, and using a wheelchair for the second child, then finally had her character killed off for the third.

In 1953, she co-starred with James Dean in the half-hour Campbell Summer Soundstage television special: "Something For an Empty Briefcase".

In 1959, she moved to Toronto. In 1963, she began introducing plays to schools. She founded the Young People's Theatre in Toronto in 1965, with the goal of introducing children to the live theater experience. This was renamed the Susan Douglas Rubes Theatre Center in 1977. Today, the main venue is known as the Susan Rubes Mainstage. In 1972 she served as associate editor of A Collection of Canadian plays, volume 4. She remained artistic director of the center until 1979, then moved to CBC Television. From 1982–86, she was the head of CBC Radio Drama. From 1987–89, she was president of the Family Channel.

== Personal life ==
She married the Czech-Canadian opera singer Jan Rubeš on September 22, 1950 in New York City. Later the same year the couple appeared together in Forbidden Journey. The couple had three sons: Christopher (died 1996), Jonathan, and Anthony. They remained married until his death in 2009.

== Awards and honors ==
- Tony Award for best debut on Broadway
- Drama Bench Award, 1974
- Member of the Order of Canada, 1975
- Woman of the Year Award, B'nai Brith Women's Council of Toronto, 1979

== Filmography ==
| Year | Title | Role | Notes |
|---|---|---|---|
| 1947 | The Private Affairs of Bel Ami | Suzanne Walter | |
| 1949 | Lost Boundaries | Shelly Carter | |
| 1950 | Forbidden Journey | Mary Sherritt | |
| 1951 | Five | Roseanne | |
| 1968 | Targets | Other at the Drive-In | |
| 1971 | Face-Off | Mrs. Hunter | |
| 1982 | Jen's Place | | |
| 1987 | Haunted by Her Past | Karen's Mother | TV movie |
| 1988 | The Outside Chance of Maximilian Glick | Bryna Glick | |
| 1988 | Something About Love | Doctor | |
| 1990–1991 | Max Glick | Bryna Glick | 26 episodes |
| 1994 | Boozecan | Braston's Mum | |
