= Tilley Endurables =

Canadian hat company (founded 1980)

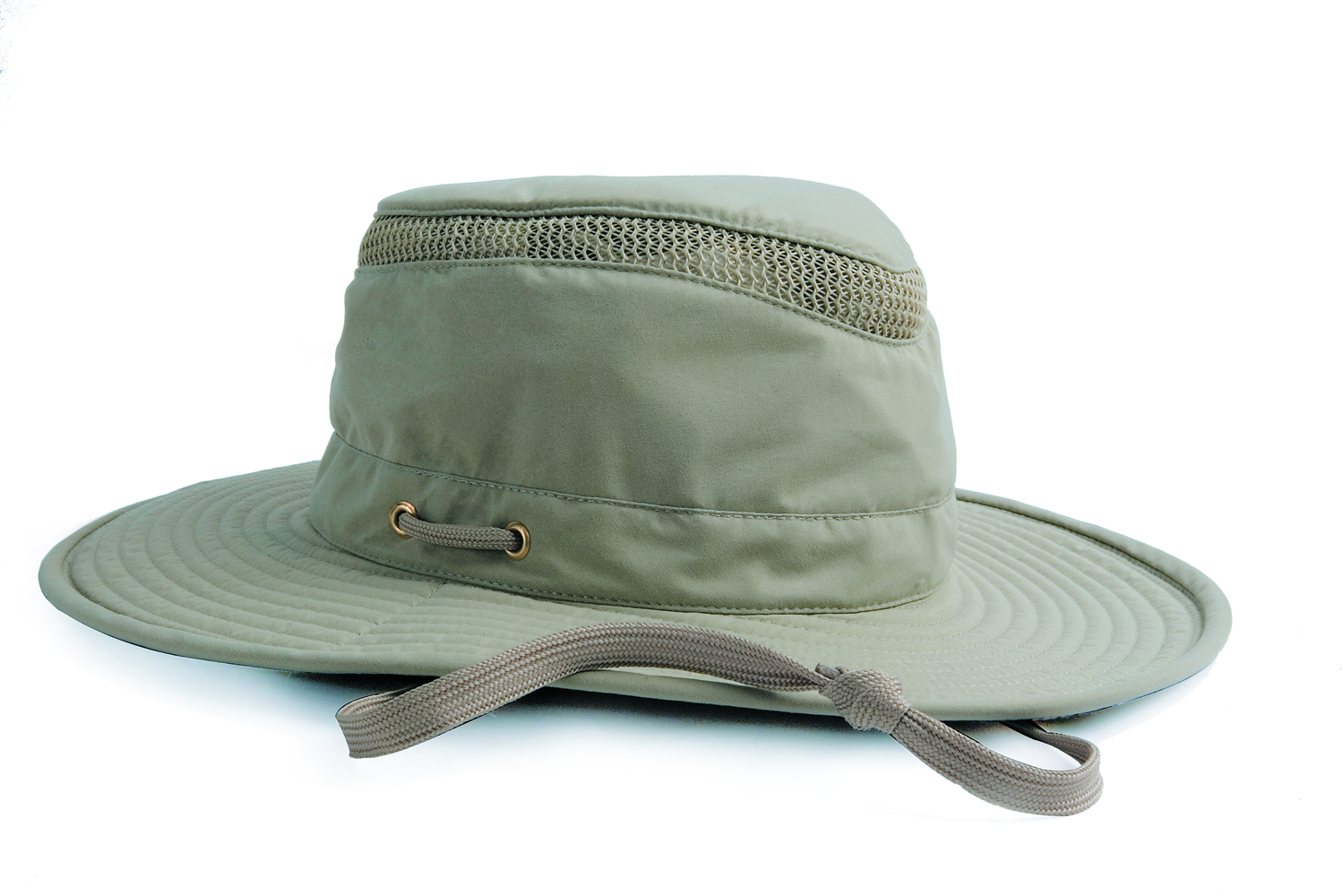
Tilley hat

Tilley Endurables is a Canadian hat company founded in 1980 by Alex Tilley (January 8, 1938 – October 28, 2025), which also manufactures travel clothing and some accessories. Tilley expanded the product line to shorts and pants designed for sailing, but soon found that many of the Tilley products were being used for travel. Tilley then expanded into "lightweight, easy to pack, practical travel clothing".

The original hat was made of cotton duck and included a brim that snaps up. As the hats were originally made for sailing, they include two straps to prevent them from blowing off. Tilley customers often write stories on the Tilley website, explaining strange experiences they have had with the hats. One such story (and shown as part of an advertisement) includes a hat being eaten by an elephant, and defecated out later that week entirely intact.

In 2015, Tilley sold the company to the Canadian subsidiary of the UK-based Hilco Capital. It was not clear whether manufacturing would remain in Canada. In 2018 Hilco Capital sold the company to Toronto, Canada-based Gibraltar & Company.
