= List of Canadian films of 1979 =

This is a list of Canadian films which were released in 1979:

Title	Director	Cast	Genre	Notes
An Adventure for Two (À nous deux)	Claude Lelouch	Catherine Deneuve, Jacques Dutronc, Jacques Villeret, Paul Préboist, Bernard Lecoq, Émile Genest	Crime, romance	Canada-France co-production
Arthur Miller on Home Ground	Harry Rasky	Arthur Miller	Documentary	
Bear Island	Don Sharp	Donald Sutherland, Vanessa Redgrave, Richard Widmark, Christopher Lee	Action drama	Canada-U.K. co-production
Blue Winter (L'hiver bleu)	André Blanchard		Docufiction	
Bravery in the Field	Giles Walker	Les Rubie, Matt Craven	Drama	
The Brood	David Cronenberg	Oliver Reed, Samantha Eggar, Art Hindle	Horror	
Bye, See You Monday (Au revoir... à lundi)	Maurice Dugowson	Carole Laure, Miou-Miou, Claude Brasseur	Romance	France-Canada co-production
Certain Practices	Martin Lavut	Richard Monette, Alan Scarfe	Drama	
Chocolate Eclair (Éclair au chocolat)	Jean-Claude Lord	Lise Thouin, Jean Belzil-Gascon, Jean-Louis Roux, Colin Fox	Drama	
City on Fire	Alvin Rakoff	Barry Newman, Susan Clark, Shelley Winters	Drama	Made with U.S. financing
Crossbar	John Trent	Brent Carver, Kim Cattrall, John Ireland, Kate Reid	Drama	CBC television film
Dieppe 1942	Terence Macartney-Filgate		Documentary	
Every Child	Derek Lamb		National Film Board animated short	Best Short Film at the Academy Awards
Every Person Is Guilty	Paul Almond	Ken Pogue, Lynne Griffin	Drama	
Fast Company	David Cronenberg	William Smith, Claudia Jennings, John Saxon, Nicholas Campbell, Cedric Smith	Race track drama	
Fish Hawk	Donald Shebib	Will Sampson, Don Francks, Charles Fields	Family film	
Getting Started	Richard Condie		NFB animated short	
Going the Distance	Paul Cowan		NFB documentary	Academy Award nominee
Heartbreak (L'arrache-cœur)	Mireille Dansereau	Louise Marleau, Françoise Faucher, Michel Mondie	Drama	
Ida Makes a Movie	Kit Hood, Linda Schuyler	Zoe Newman	Drama	Pilot film for the Degrassi television franchise
Interview	Caroline Leaf		Animated short	
Jigsaw (L'Homme en colère)	Claude Pinoteau	Lino Ventura, Angie Dickinson	Drama	Canada-France coproduction
King Solomon's Treasure	Alvin Rakoff	John Colicos	Adventure drama	
The Log Driver's Waltz	John Weldon		Animated short	
A Man, a Woman, and a Bank	Noel Black	Donald Sutherland, Brooke Adams	Crime drama	
Meatballs	Ivan Reitman	Bill Murray, Harvey Atkin, Kate Lynch	Summer camp comedy	Bill Murray's first film
Murder by Decree	Bob Clark	Christopher Plummer, James Mason, David Hemmings	A Sherlock Holmes mystery based on the Jack the Ripper killings	Canada-U.K. co-production
Nails	Phillip Borsos		Short	Academy Award nominee; Genie Awards – Live-Action Short, Non-Feature Musical Score
The Only Game in Town	Ron Mann, David Fine		Animated short	
Paper Wheat	Albert Kish			
Paperland: The Bureaucrat Observed	Donald Brittain		Documentary	
Plague	Ed Hunt	Daniel Pilon, Kate Reid, Celine Lomez	Science fiction	
Revolution's Orphans	John N. Smith	Rudi Lipp, Bronwen Mantel	Short drama	
Riel	Roy Moore	Raymond Cloutier, Christopher Plummer	Historical drama	
Romie-0 and Julie-8	Clive A. Smith		Animated	
Running	Steven Hilliard Stern	Michael Douglas, Susan Anspach, Lawrence Dane, Eugene Levy, Chuck Shamata	Melodrama	
A Scream from Silence (Mourir à tue-tête)	Anne Claire Poirier	Julie Vincent, Germain Houde, Paul Savoie	Docudrama	
Search and Destroy	William Fruet	Don Stroud, Perry King, Tisa Farrow, George Kennedy	Action drama	Made with U.S. financing
The Shape of Things to Come	George McCowan	Jack Palance, Carol Lynley, Barry Morse	Science fiction	
Something's Rotten	Harvey Frost	Charlotte Blunt, Geoffrey Bowes, Christopher Barry, Cec Linder	Drama	
Stone Cold Dead	George Mendeluk			
Summer's Children	Julius Kohanyi	Thomas Hauff, Michael Ironside, Don Francks	Drama	
Taking Chances	Robert Lang		Short docudrama	
Title Shot	Les Rose	Tony Curtis, Richard Gabourie	Crime drama	
To Be Sixteen (Avoir 16 ans)	Jean Pierre Lefebvre	Yves Benoît, Louise Choquette, Aubert Pallascio	Drama	
Track Stars: The Unseen Heroes of Movie Sound	Terry Burke	Peter Muir, Paul Amato	Short documentary	
Twice Upon a Time... (Il était deux fois)	Giles Walker	Michel Choquette, Wayne Robson	Satirical short	
Wild Horse Hank	Eric Till		Drama	
The Wordsmith	Claude Jutra	Saul Rubinek, Janet Ward, Peter Boretski	Drama	

== See also ==
- 1979 in Canada
- 1979 in Canadian television
