= 1st Genie Awards =

1980 Canadian film awards

- Date: March 20, 1980
- Site: Royal Alexandra Theatre, Toronto
- Hosted by: Bruno Gerussi; Ben Wicks

Highlights
- Best Picture: The Changeling
- Most nominations: The Changeling

The 1st Genie Awards were presented on March 20, 1980, and honoured films released in 1979.

Immediately after the 1978 Canadian Film Awards, which were nearly cancelled due to disputes and controversy, industry leaders met to design a new awards organization based on the academy system of industry nomination and secret ballot. Members of the Canadian Film Awards committee were skeptical about nominator qualifications, and about the motivations of those who wanted the academy system, fearing that they would imitate the American model and that big-budget commercial films would swamp Canadian films.

After a year of discussion, it was agreed that 14 members of the CFA committee and 14 elected representatives from industry organizations would form a board to oversee a new association whose mandate was to stimulate higher standards of filmmaking, foster educational service and develop public awareness of the industry. On April 11, 1979, the creation of the Academy of Canadian Cinema & Television was formally announced.

For the first time 500 filmmakers were responsible for nomination and voting. Films were screened for members in Montreal and Toronto and then chosen by secret nomination and final ballot before being submitted to an impartial accounting firm.

== Ceremony ==
The first Genie Awards, as they were now known, were given out at a gala event at the Royal Alexandra Theatre in Toronto with actor Bruno Gerussi as host.

The show was broadcast live on CBC Television and was noted for its Oscars-like production design, with production numbers including a jazz dance performance by Jeff Hyslop and Karen Kain set to the tune of "Dancing in the Dark", and female impersonator Craig Russell in character as Judy Garland.

On March 19, cartoonist Ben Wicks hosted a luncheon for the 105 entrants in the non-feature categories. Also this year, on November 6, and under the administration of the academy, the Canadian Film Editors Guild, the Canadian Society of Cinematographers and the Canadian Film Sound Society hosted the 1980 Film Craft Awards.

== Controversies ==
The event was not without controversy. Despite having duly released three nominations in the category of Editing in a Dramatic Film (Non-Feature), the jury used the moment of presentation to announce that they had deemed none worthy of an award. Producer Sam Levene, in his acceptance speech for another award, called the decision an "arrogant slap in the face" to the nominees. The fact that no French language films won any major awards was an issue. Award winner Christopher Plummer used his speech to criticize the distinction made between Canadian and foreign actors, calling on the academy to treat "Canadian or Samothracian" actors equally. The Foreign Actors categories were dropped in 1984.

== Award winners and nominees ==
=== Films ===
Best Motion Picture	Outstanding Theatrical Short
The Changeling – Chessman Park Productions, Garth Drabinsky and Joel B. Michaels producers, Peter Medak director; Cordélia – National Film Board of Canada, Jean-Marc Garand, Jacques Gagné and Roger Frappier producers, Jean-Marc Garand director; Klondike Fever – CFI Investments, Gilbert W. Taylor and Harry Alan Towers) producers, Peter Carter director; Meatballs – Famous Players, CFDC and Haliburton Films, Daniel Goldberg, John Dunning and André Link producers, Ivan Reitman director; Running – CFDC, Robert M. Cooper, John M. Eckert and Ronald I. Cohen producers, Steven Hilliard Stern director	Nails – National Film Board of Canada and Mercury Pictures, Phillip Borsos producer and director; Twice Upon a Time... (Il était deux fois) – National Film Board of Canada, Roman Kroitor and Stefan Wodoslawsky producers, Giles Walker director; Track Stars: The Unseen Heroes of Movie Sound – Film Arts, Movement Films, Terry Burke and Don Haig producers, Terry Burke director
Outstanding Documentary 30 Minutes and Under	Outstanding Documentary 30 Minutes and Over
Priory: The Only Home I've Got – National Film Board of Canada, Anne Wheeler and Tony Karch producers, Mark Dolgoy director; It's Not an Illness – Claire Prieto producer, Roger McTair director; Taking Chances – Mobius Productions, Marilyn Belec producer, Robert Lang director	Paperland: The Bureaucrat Observed – National Film Board of Canada, Donald Brittain and Marrin Canell producers, Donald Brittain director; Cities: Glenn Gould's Toronto – John McGreevy Productions and Nielsen-Ferns International, John McGreevy and Pat Ferns producers, John McGreevy director; Dieppe 1942 – Canadian Broadcasting Corporation, Terence Macartney-Filgate producer and director
Outstanding TV Drama 30 Minutes and Under	Outstanding TV Drama 30 Minutes and Over
Bravery in the Field – National Film Board of Canada, Roman Kroitor and Stefan Wodoslawsky producers, Giles Walker director; Revolution's Orphans – National Film Board of Canada, Rob Iveson and Roman Kroitor producers, John N. Smith director; The Spirit of the River to China – Barb Wiseberg and Barry Pearson producers	Certain Practices – Canadian Broadcasting Corporation, Bill Gough and Sam Levene producers; For the Record: "Every Person Is Guilty" – Canadian Broadcasting Corporation, Sam Levene and Vivienne Leebosh producers; The Wordsmith – Canadian Broadcasting Corporation, Robert Sherrin and Robert Allen producers, Claude Jutra director
Outstanding Animation	Outstanding Independent Film
Every Child (Chaque enfant) – National Film Board of Canada, Derek Lamb producer, Eugene Fedorenko director; Caninabis – National Film Board of Canada, Gaston Sarault producer, Kaj Pindal director; Tukiki and His Search for a Merry Christmas – Atkinson Film-Arts, Titlecraft, Pooled Film Services, W.H. Stevens, Jr. and Beryl Friesen producers, Vic Atkinson director	Track Stars: The Unseen Heroes of Movie Sound – Film Arts and Movement Films, Don Haig and Terry Burke producers, Don Haig director; Cities: Glenn Gould's Toronto – John McGreevy Productions, Nielsen-Ferns International, Pat Ferns and John McGreevy producers, John McGreevy director; Tukiki and His Search for a Merry Christmas – Atkinson Film-Arts, Titlecraft, Pooled Film Services, W.H. Stevens, Jr. and Beryl Friesen producers, Vic Atkinson director

=== Feature film craft awards ===
Best Performance by an Actor in a Leading Role	Best Performance by an Actress in a Leading Role
Christopher Plummer, Murder by Decree; Geoffrey Bowes, Something's Rotten; Robin Gammell, Klondike Fever; Thomas Hauff, Summer's Children; Stephen Lack, The Rubber Gun	Kate Lynch, Meatballs; Micheline Lanctôt, A Scream from Silence {Mourir à tue-tête); Louise Marleau, (Heartbreak (L'arrache-coeur); Claire Pimparé, Yesterday; Louise Portal, Cordélia
Best Performance by an Actor in a Supporting Role	Best Performance by an Actress in a Supporting Role
Gordon Pinsent, Klondike Fever; Harvey Atkin, Meatballs; Lawrence Dane, Running; Chris Makepeace, Meatballs; Saul Rubinek, Agency; Robert A. Silverman, The Brood	Geneviève Bujold, Murder by Decree; Helen Burns, The Changeling; Patricia Collins, Summer's Children; Barbara Gordon, Wild Horse Hank; Frances Hyland, The Changeling
Best Performance by a Foreign Actor	Best Performance by a Foreign Actress
George C. Scott, The Changeling; Michael Douglas, Running; Bill Murray, Meatballs; Will Sampson, Fish Hawk; Rod Steiger, Klondike Fever	Trish Van Devere, The Changeling; Susan Anspach, Running; Samantha Eggar, The Brood; Sally Kellerman, It Rained All Night the Day I Left; Cloris Leachman, Yesterday
Best Achievement in Art Direction	Outstanding Achievement in Costume Design
Trevor Williams, The Changeling; Denis Boucher and Vianney Gauthier, Cordélia; Seamus Flannery, Fish Hawk; Seamus Flannery, Klondike Fever; Wolf Kroeger, It Rained All Night the Day I Left; Roy Forge Smith, Yesterday; Carol Spier, The Brood	Louise Jobin, Cordélia; François Barbeau, Chocolate Eclair (Éclair au chocolat); Linda Matheson, Fish Hawk; Patti Unger, Klondike Fever; Julie Whitfield, Something's Rotten; Julie Whitfield, Tanya's Island
Best Achievement in Cinematography	Best Achievement in Direction
John Coquillon, The Changeling; Miklós Lente, Agency; Pierre Mignot, Cordélia; Reginald H. Morris, Murder by Decree; Laszlo George, Running	Bob Clark, Murder by Decree; Peter Carter, Klondike Fever; Anne-Claire Poirier, A Scream from Silence (Mourir à tue-tête); Donald Shebib, Fish Hawk; Eric Till, Wild Horse Hank
Best Achievement in Film Editing	Best Achievement in Sound Editing
Stan Cole, Murder by Decree; George Appleby, Wild Horse Hank; Jean Beaudin, Cordélia; Debra Karen, Meatballs; Debra Karen, Yesterday; Marcel Pothier, Heartbreak (L'arrache-coeur); Ron Wisman, Fish Hawk	Patrick Drummond, Dennis Drummond and Robert Grieve, The Changeling; Michael Clark and Brian French, Wild Horse Hank; Kenneth Heeley-Ray, Agency; Kenneth Heeley-Ray, Murder by Decree; Marcel Pothier, Chocolate Eclair (Éclair au chocolat)
Best Achievement in Sound	Outstanding Original Music Score
Joe Grimaldi, Austin Grimaldi, Dino Pigat and Karl Scherer, The Changeling; David Appleby and Joe Grimaldi, Murder by Decree; Gary C. Bourgeois and Richard Lightstone, Meatballs; Joe Grimaldi and Bryan Day, The Brood; Owen Langevin, Joe Grimaldi and David Appleby, Running	Carl Zittrer and Paul Zaza, Murder by Decree; Hagood Hardy, Klondike Fever; Paul Hoffert, Wild Horse Hank; Alain Leroux, It Rained All Night the Day I Left; Howard Shore, The Brood
Best Original Screenplay	Best Screenplay Adapted from Another Medium
Len Blum, Dan Goldberg and Janis Allen, Meatballs; Mireille Dansereau, Heartbreak (L'arrache-coeur); Allan Moyle, John Laing and Stephen Lack, The Rubber Gun; Jim Osborne, Summer's Children; Anne Claire Poirier and Marthe Blackburn, A Scream from Silence (Mourir à tue-tête); Steven Hilliard Stern, Running	William Gray and Diana Maddox, The Changeling; Ted Allan, It Rained All Night the Day I Left; Jean Beaudin and Marcel Sabourin, Cordélia; R. J. Dryer and Martin Lager, Klondike Fever; Jean-Claude Lord and Jean Salvy, Chocolate Eclair (Éclair au chocolat)

=== Non-feature craft awards ===
Outstanding Performance by an Actor	Outstanding Performance by an Actress
Rudi Lipp, Revolution's Orphans; Ken Pogue, For the Record: "Every Person Is Guilty"; Saul Rubinek, The Wordsmith	Martha Henry, The Newcomers; Lynne Griffin, For the Record: "Every Person Is Guilty"; Bronwen Mantel, Revolution's Orphans; Janet Ward, The Wordsmith
Outstanding Cinematography in a Dramatic Film	Outstanding Cinematography in a Documentary
Savas Kalogeras, Bravery in the Field; David De Volpi, Revolution's Orphans; Kenneth W. Gregg, For the Record: "Every Person Is Guilty"	Roger Rochat, Ice Birds (Le Pilier de cristal); Ron Orieux, Nails; Barry Perles and Douglas Kiefer, Paperland: The Bureaucrat Observed; Charles Stewart, Dieppe 1942
Outstanding Direction in a Dramatic Film	Outstanding Direction in a Documentary
Paul Almond, For the Record: "Every Person Is Guilty"; Barry Healey, The Night Before the Morning After; John N. Smith, Revolution's Orphans	Donald Brittain, Paperland: The Bureaucrat Observed; Phillip Borsos, Nails; Terence Macartney-Filgate, Dieppe 1942
Outstanding Art Direction	Outstanding Editing in Documentary
Milton Parcher, The Wordsmith; William Beeton, Riel; Earl Preston, Revolution's Orphans	Richard Todd, Paperland: The Bureaucrat Observed; Thomas Berner, Dieppe 1942; Raymond Hall, Nails; Andy Malcolm and Terry Burke, Track Stars: The Unseen Heroes of Movie Sound
Outstanding Editing in a Dramatic Film	Outstanding Sound in a Non-Feature Film
Not awarded; Haida Paul, The Night Before the Morning After; Arla Saare, The Wordsmith; Myrtle Virgo, For the Record: "Every Person Is Guilty"	Tony Van den Akker, Al Caruso, Andy Malcolm and Terry Burke, Track Stars: The Unseen Heroes of Movie Sound; Hans Oomes and Bernard Bordeleau, Paperland: The Bureaucrat Observed; Alex Taylor, Michael Lax and Austin Grimaldi, Dieppe 1942
Outstanding Screenplay	Outstanding Non-Dramatic Script
Mordecai Richler, The Wordsmith; Barry Healey, The Night Before the Morning After; János Szanyi, Laszlo Gefin and John N. Smith, Revolution's Orphans; Ralph L. Thomas, For the Record: "Every Person Is Guilty"	Ronald Blumer, John Random and Donald Brittain, Paperland: The Bureaucrat Observed; Timothy Findley and William Whitehead, Dieppe 1942; Glenn Gould, Cities: Glenn Gould's Toronto
Outstanding Original Music Score	Golden Reel Award
Michael Conway Baker, Nails; Hagood Hardy, Tukiki and His Search for a Merry Christmas; Rick Wilkins, Dieppe 1942	Daniel Goldberg and Ivan Reitman, Meatballs
Special Awards	
Air Canada Award: George Destounis (Famous Players president), for outstanding contributions to the business of filmmaking in Canada; John Grierson Award: Rex Tasker, for outstanding contributions to Canadian cinema; Certain Practices, for direction, screenplay and editing; Every Child (Chaque enfant) — Hans-Peter Strobl for sound
