= Canadian Screen Award for Best Editing in a Documentary =

Annual Canadian film award

- Country: Canada
- Presented by: Academy of Canadian Cinema & Television
- First award: 1980
- Currently held by: Nicole Bazuin for Modern Whore (2025)
- Website: academy.ca/awards

The Canadian Screen Award for Best Editing in a Documentary is an annual award, presented as part of the Canadian Screen Awards program to honour the year's best editing in a documentary film. It is presented separately from the Canadian Screen Award for Best Editing for narrative feature films.

An award for Best Editing in a Non-Feature, with its nominees consisting entirely of short or television documentary films, was presented at the 1st Genie Awards in 1980, and an award for Best Editing in a Documentary was presented at the short-lived Bijou Awards in 1981, although the academy never presented an award for editing in theatrical feature documentaries until the 3rd Canadian Screen Awards in 2015. The non-feature winners from 1980 and 1981 have, however, been included below.

== 1980s ==
Year	Nominees	Film	Ref
1980; 1st Genie Awards (Non-Feature)
1980; 1st Genie Awards (Non-Feature)	Richard Todd	Paperland: The Bureaucrat Observed	
1980; 1st Genie Awards (Non-Feature)	Thomas Berner	Dieppe 1942	
1980; 1st Genie Awards (Non-Feature)	Raymond Hall	Nails	
1980; 1st Genie Awards (Non-Feature)	Andy Malcolm, Terry Burke	Track Stars: The Unseen Heroes of Movie Sound	
1981; Bijou Awards (Non-Feature)
1981; Bijou Awards (Non-Feature)	Harvey Zlatarits	The Hawk	

== 2010s ==
Year	Nominees	Film	Ref
2014; 3rd Canadian Screen Awards
2014; 3rd Canadian Screen Awards	Reginald Harkema, Alex Shuper	Super Duper Alice Cooper	
2014; 3rd Canadian Screen Awards	Mathieu Bouchard-Malo	Guidelines (La marche à suivre)	
2014; 3rd Canadian Screen Awards	Tony Girardin	Marinoni: The Fire in the Frame	
2014; 3rd Canadian Screen Awards	Robert Kennedy	Altman	
2014; 3rd Canadian Screen Awards	Myriam Magassouba	All That We Make (Fermières)	
2015; 4th Canadian Screen Awards
2015; 4th Canadian Screen Awards	James Scott	How to Change the World	
2015; 4th Canadian Screen Awards	Geoffrey Boulangé, Sophie Deraspe	The Amina Profile	
2015; 4th Canadian Screen Awards	Emmanuelle Lane	Welcome to F.L. (Bienvenue à F.L.)	
2015; 4th Canadian Screen Awards	Louis-Martin Paradis	The Price We Pay	
2015; 4th Canadian Screen Awards	Elric Robichon	Last of the Elephant Men	
2016; 5th Canadian Screen Awards
2016; 5th Canadian Screen Awards	Dave De Carlo	Giants of Africa	
2016; 5th Canadian Screen Awards	Mathieu Bouchard-Malo	Gulîstan, Land of Roses	
2016; 5th Canadian Screen Awards	Michael Brockington	Koneline: Our Land Beautiful	
2016; 5th Canadian Screen Awards	Nathalie Lamoureux	Waseskun	
2016; 5th Canadian Screen Awards	Eric Pedicelli	Black Code	
2017; 6th Canadian Screen Awards
2017; 6th Canadian Screen Awards	Benjamin Duffield, Jeremiah Hayes	Rumble: The Indians Who Rocked the World	
2017; 6th Canadian Screen Awards	Frank Cassano	Sled Dogs	
2017; 6th Canadian Screen Awards	Anouk Deschênes	Manic	
2017; 6th Canadian Screen Awards	François Jacob, Jéricho Jeudy	A Moon of Nickel and Ice (Sur la lune de nickel)	
2017; 6th Canadian Screen Awards	Roland Schlimme	Long Time Running	
2018; 7th Canadian Screen Awards
2018; 7th Canadian Screen Awards	Michel Giroux	The Devil's Share (La Part du diable)	
2018; 7th Canadian Screen Awards	Michael Aaglund, Graeme Ring	What Walaa Wants	
2018; 7th Canadian Screen Awards	Dave Kazala	Dolphin Man	
2018; 7th Canadian Screen Awards	Rich Williamson	Take Light	
2018; 7th Canadian Screen Awards	Graham Withers	Transformer	
2019; 8th Canadian Screen Awards
2019; 8th Canadian Screen Awards	Sophie Leblond, Pedro Pires, Sylvia de Angelis	Alexander Odyssey (Alexandre le fou)	
2019; 8th Canadian Screen Awards	Nick Hector	Prey	
2019; 8th Canadian Screen Awards	Bruce Lapointe	Invisible Essence: The Little Prince	
2019; 8th Canadian Screen Awards	David New	Propaganda: The Art of Selling Lies	
2019; 8th Canadian Screen Awards	Eamonn O'Connor, Daniel Roher	Once Were Brothers: Robbie Robertson and The Band	

== 2020s ==
Year	Nominee	Film	Ref
2020; 9th Canadian Screen Awards
2020; 9th Canadian Screen Awards	Natalie Lamoureux	A Woman, My Mother (Une femme, ma mère)	
2020; 9th Canadian Screen Awards	Natacha Dufaux	The Free Ones (Les libres)	
2020; 9th Canadian Screen Awards	Lawrence Le Lam	The World Is Bright	
2020; 9th Canadian Screen Awards	Jonah Malak	Dave Not Coming Back	
2020; 9th Canadian Screen Awards	Peter Roeck	The New Corporation: The Unfortunately Necessary Sequel	
2021; 10th Canadian Screen Awards
2021; 10th Canadian Screen Awards	Ben Lawrence	My Tree	
2021; 10th Canadian Screen Awards	Jennifer Abbott	The Magnitude of All Things	
2021; 10th Canadian Screen Awards	Sophie Farkas Bolla	The Gig Is Up	
2021; 10th Canadian Screen Awards	Natalie Lamoureux	I Might Be Dead by Tomorrow (Tant que j'ai du respir dans le corps)	
2021; 10th Canadian Screen Awards	Hans Olson	Kímmapiiyipitssini: The Meaning of Empathy	
2022; 11th Canadian Screen Awards
2022; 11th Canadian Screen Awards	Mike Munn, Dave Kazala	To Kill a Tiger	
2022; 11th Canadian Screen Awards	Jeremiah Hayes	Dear Audrey	
2022; 11th Canadian Screen Awards	Noura Kevorkian, Mike Munn	Batata	
2022; 11th Canadian Screen Awards	René Roberge	Bloom (Jouvencelles)	
2022; 11th Canadian Screen Awards	Jeremy Schaulin-Rioux	Handle With Care: The Legend of the Notic Streetball Crew	
2023; 12th Canadian Screen Awards
2023; 12th Canadian Screen Awards	Anouk Deschênes	The Longest Goodbye	
2023; 12th Canadian Screen Awards	Denys Desjardins, Michel Giroux	I Lost My Mom (J'ai placé ma mère)	
2023; 12th Canadian Screen Awards	Derek Esposito, Cecilio Escobar	Summer Qamp	
2023; 12th Canadian Screen Awards	Marianna Khoury	Someone Lives Here	
2023; 12th Canadian Screen Awards	Rich Williamson	Cynara	
2024; 13th Canadian Screen Awards
2024; 13th Canadian Screen Awards	David Schmidt	Wilfred Buck	
2024; 13th Canadian Screen Awards	Jon Affolter, Heath Affolter, Nathan Affolter, Thomas Affolter	Altona	
2024; 13th Canadian Screen Awards	Marie-Pier Grignon	Okurimono	
2024; 13th Canadian Screen Awards	Geoff Klein	I Shall Not Hate	
2024; 13th Canadian Screen Awards	Sonia Godding Togobo	A Mother Apart	
2025; 14th Canadian Screen Awards
2025; 14th Canadian Screen Awards	Nicole Bazuin	Modern Whore	
2025; 14th Canadian Screen Awards	Ricardo Acosta	Parade: Queer Acts of Love and Resistance	
2025; 14th Canadian Screen Awards	Cindy Au Yeung	Arthur Erickson: Beauty Between the Lines	
2025; 14th Canadian Screen Awards	Andrew Beach, Graham Withers	It's All Gonna Break	
2025; 14th Canadian Screen Awards	Greg Ng, Hart Snider	Saints and Warriors	

== See also ==
- Prix Iris for Best Editing in a Documentary
