= Genie Award for Best Actress (Non-Feature) =

Retired annual Canadian media award

Best Performance by an Actress (Non-Feature) was a Canadian award which was presented by the Canadian Film Awards from 1969 to 1978, by the Genie Awards in 1980 and by the shortlived Bijou Awards in 1981, to honour the best performance by an actress in film which was not a theatrical feature film, such as television films or short films.

== 1960s ==
Year	Nominee	Film
1969; 21st Canadian Film Awards
1969; 21st Canadian Film Awards	Jackie Burroughs	Dulcima
1969; 21st Canadian Film Awards	Josephine Barrington	McQueen: "There's a Car Upside Down on My Lawn"
1969; 21st Canadian Film Awards	Margot Kidder	Corwin: "Does Anybody Here Know Denny?"

== 1970s ==
Year	Nominee	Film
1970; 22nd Canadian Film Awards
1970; 22nd Canadian Film Awards	Linda Goranson	The Manipulators: "The Spike in the Wall"
1971; 23rd Canadian Film Awards
1971; 23rd Canadian Film Awards	Carole Lazare	The Megantic Outlaw
1972; 24th Canadian Film Awards
1972; 24th Canadian Film Awards	Patricia Collins	The Golden Handshake
1973; 25th Canadian Film Awards
1973; 25th Canadian Film Awards	Jackie Burroughs	Vicky
1974
1974	No award presented	
1975; 26th Canadian Film Awards
1975; 26th Canadian Film Awards	Jayne Eastwood	The Collaborators: "Deedee"
1976; 27th Canadian Film Awards
1976; 27th Canadian Film Awards	Luce Guilbeault	Bargain Basement
1977; 28th Canadian Film Awards
1977; 28th Canadian Film Awards	Marina Dimakopoulos	Happiness Is Loving Your Teacher
1978; 29th Canadian Film Awards
1978; 29th Canadian Film Awards	Chapelle Jaffe	One Night Stand
1978; 29th Canadian Film Awards	Sylvie Lachance	The Machine Age (L'Âge de la machine)
1978; 29th Canadian Film Awards	Roberta Maxwell	A Matter of Choice
1978; 29th Canadian Film Awards	Sarah Torgov	Drying Up the Streets

== 1980s ==
Year	Nominee	Film
1980; 1st Genie Awards
1980; 1st Genie Awards	Martha Henry	The Newcomers
1980; 1st Genie Awards	Lynne Griffin	Every Person Is Guilty
1980; 1st Genie Awards	Bronwen Mantel	Revolution's Orphans
1980; 1st Genie Awards	Janet Ward	The Wordsmith
1981; Bijou Awards
1981; Bijou Awards	Lally Cadeau	You've Come a Long Way, Katie
1981; Bijou Awards	Sharry Flett	War Brides
1981; Bijou Awards	Dixie Seatle	A Population of One
