= Custard Pie (TV series) =

- Genre: Sitcom
- Directed by: Perry Rosemond
- Country of origin: Canada
- Original language: English
- No. of seasons: 1

Production
- Producer: Perry Rosemond
- Running time: 30 minutes

Original release
- Network: CBC Television
- Release: 20 September – 27 December 1977

Custard Pie is a Canadian sitcom television series that aired on CBC Television in 1977.

== The Rimshots pilot ==
This series began as The Rimshots, a pilot directed and produced by Perry Rosemond and directed by George Bloomfield. It starred Second City Television cast members Andrea Martin, Catherine O'Hara, and Dave Thomas with Saul Rubinek. Its plot concerned a household of performing artists who expected to perform at the O'Keefe Centre, only to find their concert cancelled. They accept a gig at a Hungarian venue instead, dealing with the challenges of an audience who did not understand their language.

CBC management approved a series run, however most of the cast, still committed to their work on Second City Television, demanded various controls over the production, scheduling and creative content. CBC's Drama department proceeded to select a new cast, retitle the series to Custard Pie, and record on videotape rather than on film as was done for the pilot.

== Series premise ==
In the series, the four members of a comedy team are roommates in a house. Leo Strauss (Peter Kastner) functions as the troupe's manager. Another team member, Sheila Ann Murphy (Kate Lynch), wishes to perform in more serious dramatic roles instead. Maggie Tucker (Nancy Dolman), besides being one of the performers, has a part-time job at Aldo Ludwit's (Les Carlson) gas station and eatery. Finally, Harvey Douglas (Derek McGrath) is the owner of the team's only vehicle, a van. The troupe's landlady, Vicie DeMarco (Vivian Reis), was also a regular series character.

== Scheduling ==
This half-hour series was broadcast on Tuesdays at 7:30 p.m. (Eastern) from 20 September to 27 December 1977. It was cancelled after its sole 13-week season amid negative critical reaction and the perceived inferiority of the series compared to its The Rimshots pilot episode.
