= Summer's Children =

- Directed by: Julius Kohanyi
- Written by: Jim Osborne
- Produced by: Don Haig; Julius Kohanyi
- Starring: Thomas Hauff; Paully Jardine; Don Francks; Kate Lynch
- Cinematography: Josef Seckeresh
- Edited by: Michael Manne
- Music by: Christopher L. Stone (as Chris Stone)
- Production company: Ha Ha Productions
- Distributed by: Green Acre Films
- Release date: 1979
- Running time: 83 minutes
- Country: Canada
- Language: English
- Budget: CAD 200,000

Summer's Children is a 1979 Canadian drama film directed by Julius Kohanyi and written by Jim Osborne. It stars Thomas Hauff, Paully Jardine, Don Francks, Kate Lynch, and Patricia Collins.

The film received three Genie Award nominations at the 1st Genie Awards in 1980: Hauff for Best Actor, Collins for Best Supporting Actress and Osborne for Best Original Screenplay.

== Synopsis ==
The film is about the bond of love between a brother and sister, and depicts their escape to Toronto from a small Ontario town and a broken family. Steve is the first to leave to start a new life in Toronto, but he soon hears that his sister Jenny has also came to Toronto and is living in less than desirable conditions.

The cast of characters includes Kathy, Steve's new girlfriend; Albert, a bookie who becomes Steve's guide to the new life he's trying to build for himself; and Elaine, a bisexual artist who has had sex with both Steve and Jennie.

After discovering that Jenny has followed him to the city, he begins searching for her. In the end, they finally come face to face, only to discover their relationship as siblings is irreparable.

== Cast ==
- Thomas Hauff as Steve Linton
- Paully Jardine as Jennie Linton
- Don Francks as Albert
- Kate Lynch as Kathy
- Patricia Collins as Elaine
- Richard Eden as Mechanic
- Kay Hawtrey as Mrs. Baines
- Michael Ironside as Pimp
- Brian Miller as Fred
- Ken James as Tony
- Frank Aldous as Painter
- Wayne Best as Bob
- David Bolt as Adjuster
- Stephen Bush as Phil
- Joyce Gordon as Alice
- Lynne Cavanagh as Hooker
- Marily Harris as Iris

== Reception ==
J. Paul Costabile of Cinema Canada wrote "to an extent, the inconsistencies of the plot are mitigated by some uniformly excellent performances; the director has shown that he can draw sensitive and compelling performances from actors and deal with controversial material without sensationalism; but, it must be admitted, this film's scaffold-like plotting is a distinct handicap."

Pearl Rowell opined in The Gazette that "a film is supposed to be either educational or entertaining, it is not to encourage and sell every kind of degenerated behavior; it's hard to believe the graphic display of two men urinating brought any new light on the subject."

Film critic Geoff Pevere stated "a film purported to be a 'sensitive and tasteful treatment' of an incestuous brother/sister relationship, Summer's Children fails miserably; cheaply made and carelessly constructed; there is little in this squalid production; most of the shots, while quite attractive when taken separately, have no continuity whatsoever, and are confusing and irritating to follow; the script is incredibly pretentious and the two young leads are obviously uncomfortable in front of a camera, something usually avoided in the hands of a confident filmmaker."

== Accolades ==
The film received three Genie Award nominations at the 1st Genie Awards in 1980: Best Actor (Hauff), Best Supporting Actress (Collins) and Best Original Screenplay (Jim Osborne). Sid Adilman of the Toronto Star singled out Francks' failure to receive a Best Supporting Actor nomination as one of the biggest oversights of the entire awards ceremony.

The film won an award for Best First Feature at the Texas International Film Festival. It received only limited theatrical distribution in Canada, and was instead seen primarily as a television film on CBC Television.

== See also ==
- Cinema of Canada
- List of Canadian films of 1979
- List of films shot in Toronto
- List of LGBTQ-related films of 1979
