= Arla Saare =

Canadian film and television editor

Arla Agnes Isabella Axelsdotter Saarukka (November 28, 1915 – May 9, 2013), commonly known as Arla Saare, was a Canadian film and television editor. She was noted for being a two-time Canadian Film Award winner for her work in both sound and picture editing.

Born in Finland, Saare came to Canada with her family in childhood and grew up in Vancouver, British Columbia. A graduate of the Vancouver School of Art, she first worked as an x-ray technician at Vancouver General Hospital. She joined the National Film Board of Canada in 1942, working as a negative cutter and in the optical and special effects department, becoming the head of the department by 1945. Saare joined the Canadian Broadcasting Corporation at the launch of CBC Television in 1952, working for the Toronto affiliate CBLT for about a year until transferring back to Vancouver upon the launch of CBUT in 1953. In Vancouver, she was a key figure in both the emergence of the CBUT Film Unit as one of the major documentary production houses in Canada and the development of British Columbia's regional film industry.

After leaving the CBC in 1967 she worked as a freelance editor for a number of years, predominantly but not exclusively on documentary films. She won the CFA for Best Sound Editing, Non-Feature at the 25th Canadian Film Awards in 1973 for The Shield, and Best Picture Editing, Non Feature at the 26th Canadian Film Awards in 1975 for Next Year in Jerusalem. She was also a Genie Award nominee for Best Editing, Non-Feature at the 1st Genie Awards in 1980 for The Wordsmith, and Best Editing at the 3rd Genie Awards in 1982 for Silence of the North.

Her other credits include the films A Married Couple, Come on Children, Rose's House, Homage to Chagall: The Colours of Love, and Who Has Seen the Wind, as well as two documentary series, Mexico and The National Dream.

In 1991 she was the recipient of a lifetime achievement award from the Toronto chapter of Women in Film and Television International.
