= Priory: The Only Home I've Got =

- Directed by: Mark Dolgoy
- Produced by: Anne Wheeler; Tony Karch
- Cinematography: Doug McKay
- Edited by: Christopher Tate
- Music by: Geoff Venables
- Production company: National Film Board of Canada
- Release date: 1978
- Running time: 59 minutes
- Country: Canada
- Language: English

Priory: The Only Home I've Got is a Canadian short documentary film, directed by Mark Dolgoy and released in 1978. The film is a portrait of the Priory Hospital in Victoria, British Columbia, a long-term care facility organized around the then-new model of independent living.

The film won the Genie Award for Best Documentary Under 30 Minutes at the 1st Genie Awards in 1980.
