= Taking Care =

- Directed by: Clarke Mackey
- Written by: Rebecca Schechter
- Produced by: Pasia Schonberg
- Starring: Janet Amos; Kate Lynch; Saul Rubinek
- Cinematography: Keith Hlady
- Edited by: Teresa Hannigan
- Music by: Jane Fair
- Production companies: Telltales; Intesa Corporation
- Release date: 1987
- Running time: 90 minutes
- Country: Canada
- Language: English

Taking Care, also known as Prescriptions for Murder, is a 1987 Canadian drama film, directed by Clarke Mackey. Loosely based on the real-life case of Susan Nelles, the film stars Janet Amos as Marie, a maternity ward nurse who is accused of murder after three women die in childbirth under her care, and Kate Lynch as Angie O'Connell, her colleague who attempts to collect evidence to prove Marie's innocence.

The cast also includes Saul Rubinek, Barry Flatman, Jackie Richardson, Allan Royal and Ron White.

The film premiered at the 1987 Toronto International Film Festival.

Lynch received a Genie Award nomination for Best Actress at the 9th Genie Awards in 1988.
