= 1979 in Canadian television =

The following is a list of events affecting Canadian television in 1979. Events listed include television show debuts, finales, cancellations, and channel launches.

== Events ==
Date	Event
February 26	CBC Television broadcasts live coverage of the total solar eclipse that occurred over the Canadian Prairies and parts of what is now Nunavut (originally the eastern parts of the Northwest Territories).
March 21	Juno Awards of 1979.
May 22	Live coverage of the 1979 Canadian election airs on all the main networks.
Sep 1	The CBC Parliamentary Television Network is launched and is replaced by CPAC beginning in 1992.

=== Debuts ===
Show	Station	Premiere Date
The Great Detective	CBC Television	January 17
You Can't Do That on Television	CJOH-TV	February 3
Romie-0 and Julie-8	CBC Television	April 14
Smith & Smith	CJOH-TV	May 2
Read All About It!	TVOntario	May 2
Cities	CBC Television	May 2
Flappers	CBC Television	September 21
The Littlest Hobo	CTV	October 11

=== Ending this year ===
Show	Station	Cancelled
Canada After Dark	CBC Television	January 26
The Magic Lie	CBC Television	March 28
Science Magazine	CBC Television	April 15
A Gift To Last	CBC Television	December 16
Celebrity Cooks	Global	Unknown

== Television shows ==
=== 1950s ===
- Country Canada (1954–2007)
- CBC News Magazine (1952–1981)
- The Friendly Giant (1958–1985)
- Hockey Night in Canada (1952–present)
- The National (1954–present)
- Front Page Challenge (1957–1995)
- Wayne and Shuster Show (1958–1989)

=== 1960s ===
- CTV National News (1961–present)
- Land and Sea (1964–present)
- Man Alive (1967–2000)
- Mr. Dressup (1967–1996)
- The Nature of Things (1960–present, scientific documentary series)
- Question Period (1967–present, news program)
- Reach for the Top (1961–1985)
- Take 30 (1962–1983)
- The Tommy Hunter Show (1965–1992)
- University of the Air (1966–1983)
- W-FIVE (1966–present, newsmagazine program)

=== 1970s ===
- The Beachcombers (1972–1990)
- Canada AM (1972–present, news program)
- Canadian Express (1977–1980)
- Celebrity Cooks (1975–1984)
- City Lights (1973–1989)
- Definition (1974–1989)
- the fifth estate (1975–present, newsmagazine program)
- Grand Old Country (1975–1981)
- Headline Hunters (1972–1983)
- King of Kensington (1975–1980)
- Let's Go (1976–1984)
- Live It Up! (1978–1990)
- The Mad Dash (1978–1985)
- Marketplace (1972–present, newsmagazine program)
- Ombudsman (1974–1980)
- Parlez-moi (1978–1980)
- Polka Dot Door (1971-1993)
- Second City Television (1976–1984)
- This Land (1970–1982)
- V.I.P. (1973–1983)
- The Watson Report (1975–1981)
- 100 Huntley Street (1977–present, religious program)

== TV movies ==
- Cementhead
- Certain Practices
- Every Person Is Guilty
- Homecoming
- Je me souviens / Don't Forget Me
- One of Our Own
- The Wordsmith

== Television stations ==
=== Debuts ===
Date	Market	Station	Channel	Affiliation	Notes/References
September 3	Toronto, Ontario	CFMT-TV	47	Multicultural independent	
Unknown	Rouyn-Noranda, Quebec	CFEM-TV	13	TVA	

=== Network affiliation changes ===
Date	Market	Station	Channel	Old affiliation	New affiliation	Source
Unknown	Vancouver, British Columbia (Licensed to Bellingham, Washington, USA)	KVOS-TV	12	CBS	Independent (primary); CBS (secondary)	Most CBS programs on KVOS-TV (with a few exceptions) were dropped by the station due to complaints made by Seattle-based KIRO-TV, which is also carried on Vancouver-area cable systems.

== Births ==
Date	Name	Notability
February 23	Maryke Hendrikse	Voice actress

== See also ==
- 1979 in Canada
- List of Canadian films
