= Heartbreak (1979 film) =

- L'arrache-cœur
- Directed by: Mireille Dansereau
- Written by: Mireille Dansereau
- Produced by: Bram Appel; Mireille Dansereau; Robert Ménard
- Starring: Louise Marleau; Françoise Faucher; Michel Mondie
- Cinematography: François Protat
- Edited by: Marcel Pothier
- Music by: Alexandre Luigini
- Production companies: Films Cybèle; Productions Ciné-Plurielles; Productions Vidéofilms
- Release date: September 7, 1979 (MWFF)
- Running time: 92 minutes
- Country: Canada
- Language: French

Heartbreak (French: L'arrache-cœur) is a Canadian drama film, directed by Mireille Dansereau and released in 1979. The film stars Louise Marleau as Céline, a woman navigating complicated relationships with her husband Michel (Michel Mondie) and her mother Françoise (Françoise Faucher).

The film premiered at the Montreal World Film Festival, where Marleau won the award for Best Actress. The film received three Genie Award nominations at the 1st Genie Awards in 1980, for Best Actress (Marleau), Best Screenplay (Dansereau) and Best Editing (Marcel Pothier).
