= Lawrence O'Toole =

Lawrence O'Toole may refer to:

- Lorcán Ua Tuathail, Irish archbishop and Roman Catholic saint
- Lawrence O'Toole (journalist), Canadian film critic and memoirist
