= Cities (TV series) =

Canadian documentary television series

Cities is a Canadian documentary television series broadcast on CBC Television from 1979 to 1980. Produced and directed by John McGreevy, the series featured a celebrity who would appear in an episode profiling a personal favourite city or more specific location.

The series premiere featured Peter Ustinov profiling Leningrad, Russia. Later episodes included Glenn Gould in Toronto, Elie Wiesel in Jerusalem, R. D. Laing in Glasgow, Anthony Burgess in Rome, Mai Zetterling in Stockholm, George Plimpton in New York City, Germaine Greer in Sydney, John Huston in Dublin, Jonathan Miller in London, Melina Mercouri in Athens, Studs Terkel in Chicago, and Hildegard Knef in Berlin.

Gould's episode received three Genie Award nominations at the 1st Genie Awards, for Outstanding Independent Film, Non-Dramatic Script and Outstanding Documentary - 30 Minutes and Over.
