= Mexico (TV series) =

- Genre: Documentary
- Written by: Lister Sinclair
- Directed by: James Murray; Lister Sinclair; Bill Banting
- Narrated by: Lister Sinclair
- Country of origin: Canada
- Original language: English
- No. of seasons: 1
- No. of episodes: 4

Production
- Producer: James Murray
- Editors: Arla Saare; Moses Weingarten
- Running time: 30 minutes

Original release
- Network: CBC Television
- Release: 25 April – 16 May 1966

Mexico is a Canadian documentary television miniseries that aired on CBC Television in 1966.

== Premise ==
This four-part documentary series was an economic and socio-political overview of Mexico.

== Scheduling ==
Half-hour episodes were broadcast on Mondays at 10:00 p.m. as follows:

1. "Gunpowder And Guitars", describing Mexico's early history (25 April 1966)
2. "I Used To Be An Indian", regarding the effects of Spanish rule on Mexico's aboriginal peoples (2 May 1966)
3. "Fiesta of Bullets", about the nation's social and political challenges (9 May 1966)
4. "The Lucky Ticket", comparing Canada and Mexico in the context of American relations (16 May 1966)
