= Twice Upon a Time... =

1979 film

- French: Il était deux fois...
- Directed by: Giles Walker
- Written by: Peter Bierman
- Produced by: Roman Kroitor; Stefan Wodoslawsky
- Starring: Michel Choquette; Wayne Robson
- Cinematography: Savas Kalogeras
- Edited by: David Wilson
- Distributed by: National Film Board of Canada
- Release date: 1979
- Running time: 10 minutes
- Country: Canada
- Languages: English; French

Twice Upon a Time... (French: Il était deux fois...) is a Canadian satirical short film, directed by Giles Walker and released in 1979.

== Plot ==
A satire of the cultural separation and lack of understanding between English Canada and French Canada, the film is set in Stereoville, a community in which unilingual anglophones and unilingual francophones are permanently tied to each other back to back, and deal with encounters with speakers of the other language by simply turning around so that their backmates can handle the conversation. One day, however, their rules for life are confounded when a tourist (Michel Choquette) arrives who does not have another person strapped to his back, and is in fact capable of speaking both languages himself.

== Cast ==
The cast includes Jeannette Casenave and Évelyn Regimbald as the hotel manager, Wayne Robson and Jean Archambault as the desk clerk, Basil Fitzgibbon and Camille Ducharme as the governor, Graham Batchelor and Jacques Lavallée as the secretary, Kevin Fenlon and Michel Forgues as the choreographer, and Valda Dalton and Madeleine Sicotte as a customer.

== Award nomination ==
The film received a Genie Award nomination for Best Theatrical Short Film at the 1st Genie Awards in 1980.
