= Genie Award for Best Actor (Non-Feature) =

Canadian award

Best Performance by an Actor (Non-Feature) was a Canadian award which was presented by the Canadian Film Awards from 1969 to 1978, by the Genie Awards in 1980 and by the shortlived Bijou Awards in 1981, to honour the best performance by an actor in film which was not a theatrical feature film, such as television films or short films.

== 1960s ==
Year	Nominee	Film
1969; 21st Canadian Film Awards
1969; 21st Canadian Film Awards	Chris Wiggins	The Best Damn Fiddler from Calabogie to Kaladar
1969; 21st Canadian Film Awards	John Colicos	Dulcima
1969; 21st Canadian Film Awards	Eric House	Quentin Durgens, M.P.: "The Night Nothing Happened"

== 1970s ==
Year	Nominee	Film
1970; 22nd Canadian Film Awards
1970; 22nd Canadian Film Awards	Joey Smallwood	A Little Fellow from Gambo
1971; 23rd Canadian Film Awards
1971; 23rd Canadian Film Awards	Colin Fox	Durham and the Two Nations
1972; 24th Canadian Film Awards
1972; 24th Canadian Film Awards	Sean Sullivan	Springhill
1973; 25th Canadian Film Awards
1973; 25th Canadian Film Awards	Marcel Sabourin	Weapons and Men (Des armes et les hommes)
1974
1974	No award presented	
1975; 26th Canadian Film Awards
1975; 26th Canadian Film Awards	William Hutt	The National Dream
1976; 27th Canadian Film Awards
1976; 27th Canadian Film Awards	Ed McNamara	For Gentlemen Only
1976; 27th Canadian Film Awards	Hugh Webster	For Gentlemen Only
1977; 28th Canadian Film Awards
1977; 28th Canadian Film Awards	George Clutesi	Dreamspeaker
1978; 29th Canadian Film Awards
1978; 29th Canadian Film Awards	Brent Carver	One Night Stand
1978; 29th Canadian Film Awards	Gabriel Arcand	The Machine Age (L'Âge de la machine)
1978; 29th Canadian Film Awards	Gary Reineke	A Matter of Choice
1978; 29th Canadian Film Awards	R. H. Thomson	Tyler

== 1980s ==
Year	Nominee	Film
1980; 1st Genie Awards
1980; 1st Genie Awards	Rudi Lipp	Revolution's Orphans
1980; 1st Genie Awards	Ken Pogue	Every Person Is Guilty
1980; 1st Genie Awards	Saul Rubinek	The Wordsmith
1981; Bijou Awards
1981; Bijou Awards	Chuck Shamata	The Running Man
1981; Bijou Awards	Richard Monette	A Far Cry from Home
1981; Bijou Awards	Al Waxman	The Winnings of Frankie Walls
