= Dulcima (1969 film) =

- Written by: Matt Segal; H. E. Bates
- Directed by: Matt Segal
- Starring: Jackie Burroughs; John Colicos; Chuck Shamata
- Country of origin: Canada
- Original language: English

Production
- Running time: 90 minutes

Original release
- Network: CBC Television
- Release: October 1969

Dulcima is a 1969 Canadian television film directed and co-written by Matt Segal. The film stars Jackie Burroughs as Dulcima, a carefree girl who begins working on a run-down farm in rural Ontario owned by the miserly Mr. Parker (John Colicos). The farmer quickly becomes enamoured of the pretty and lively girl and invites her to stay, but their relations become strained when he discovers her affections for a surveyor visiting from the city (Chuck Shamata).

The story was adapted from a novella of the same name by H. E. Bates, which was also later adapted into the British feature film Dulcima in 1971.

The film aired on CBC Television in 1969. At the Canadian Film Awards that year, Burroughs won the award for Best Actress in a Non-Feature, and Colicos was nominated for Best Actor in a Non-Feature.

== Cast ==
- Jackie Burroughs as Dulcima
- John Colicos as Mr. Parker
- Chuck Shamata as Surveyor
