= Taking Chances (1979 film) =

- Directed by: Robert Lang
- Written by: Robert Lang; David McIlwraith
- Produced by: Marilyn Belec
- Cinematography: Vic Sarin
- Edited by: Steven Best
- Music by: Andrew Thompson
- Production company: Mobius Productions
- Release date: 1979
- Running time: 22 minutes
- Country: Canada
- Language: English

Taking Chances is a Canadian short educational docudrama film, directed by Robert Lang and released in 1979. The film centres on Leigh and Kathy, teenagers who are conflicted on the question of whether to introduce sex into their relationship.

John Brooke of Cinema Canada praised the film for offering a well-rounded portrait of the conflicting array of messages and social pressures that teenagers face around matters of sex rather than simply moralizing about it.

The film was a Genie Award nominee for Best Documentary Under 30 Minutes at the 1st Genie Awards in 1980.
