= Something's Rotten =

- Directed by: Harvey Frost
- Written by: Norman Fox
- Produced by: David Eustace; Nancy Stewart
- Starring: Charlotte Blunt; Christopher Barry; Geoffrey Bowes; Cec Linder
- Cinematography: Brian Hebb
- Edited by: Brian Ravok
- Music by: John Kuipers
- Production company: Hazelton Motion Pictures
- Release date: February 21, 1979
- Running time: 76 minutes
- Country: Canada
- Language: English

Something's Rotten is a Canadian drama film, directed by Harvey Frost and released in 1979. The film stars Charlotte Blunt as the queen of an unnamed European country, who is being pressured by the Prime Minister (Cec Linder) to abdicate the throne in favour of one of her sons, but who must wrestle with the question of which son, the older but emotionally unstable Prince Calvin (Geoffrey Bowes) or the younger but more mature Prince George (Christopher Barry), will be named as her successor. Meanwhile, a series of murders of the palace staff is being committed by an unidentified "Skulker", whom the queen begins to suspect may in fact be one of the princes.

The film was shot at Casa Loma in Toronto.

The film garnered two Genie Award nominations at the 1st Genie Awards in 1980, for Best Actor (Bowes) and Best Costume Design (Julie Whitfield).
