= Arthur Erickson: Beauty Between the Lines =

2024 Canadian documentary film

- Directed by: Danny Berish; Ryan Mah
- Written by: Danny Berish; Ryan Mah
- Produced by: Danny Berish; Ryan Mah; Leah Mallen
- Starring: Arthur Erickson
- Cinematography: Richard Tran
- Edited by: Cindy Au Yeung
- Music by: Jason Sharp; Jesse Zubot; Josh Zubot
- Production company: Black Rhino Creative
- Distributed by: Knowledge Network
- Release date: October 23, 2024
- Running time: 80 minutes
- Country: Canada
- Language: English

Arthur Erickson: Beauty Between the Lines is a Canadian documentary film, directed by Danny Berish and Ryan Mah and released in 2024. The film is a portrait of the influential Canadian architect Arthur Erickson, exploring both the impact of his work and his personal life, including his relatively unknown private relationship with furniture designer Francisco Kripacz.

People appearing in the film include writer Hugh Brewster, whose memorial piece about his friendship with Erickson for Xtra Magazine following Erickson's death was the only published obituary of Erickson which acknowledged that he was gay.

The film premiered at the Toronto edition of the Architecture & Design Film Festival in 2024, and was subsequently screened at the editions in Vancouver and Los Angeles. In May 2025 it premiered on Knowledge Network, followed by a November broadcast on TVO.

Cindy Au Yeung received a Canadian Screen Award nomination for Best Editing in a Documentary at the 14th Canadian Screen Awards in 2026.
