= Track Stars: The Unseen Heroes of Movie Sound =

1979 Canadian documentary film

- Directed by: Terry Burke
- Produced by: Terry Burke; Don Haig
- Starring: Peter Muir; Paul Amato
- Cinematography: Mark Irwin
- Edited by: Terry Burke; Andy Malcolm
- Production companies: Movement Films; Film Arts
- Release date: 1979
- Running time: 8 minutes
- Country: Canada
- Language: English

Track Stars: The Unseen Heroes of Movie Sound is a Canadian short documentary film, directed by Terry Burke and released in 1979. The film depicts the process of film sound through a portrait of two foley artists, Peter Muir and Paul Amato, creating sound for a film action sequence, using split screen photography to illustrate the creative process on one side, and the finished film on the other.

The film won two Genie Awards at the 1st Genie Awards in 1980, for Outstanding Independent Film and Outstanding Sound in a Non-Feature Film (Burke, Tony Van den Akker, Al Caruso, Andy Malcolm). It received two other Genie nominations, for Best Theatrical Short Film (Burke, Don Haig) and Outstanding Editing in a Documentary, Non-Feature (Burke, Andy Malcolm). It was also the winner of an award for Film as Art from the National Educational Film Festival in Oakland, California, in 1980.
