= The Most Toys =

- Star Trek: The Next Generation episode
- Episode no.: Season 3 Episode 22
- Directed by: Tim Bond
- Written by: Shari Goodhartz
- Cinematography by: Marvin Rush
- Production code: 170
- Original air date: May 7, 1990

Guest appearances
- Nehemiah Persoff as Toff; Jane Daly as Varria; Colm Meaney as Miles O'Brien; Saul Rubinek as Kivas Fajo

Episode chronology
← Previous "Hollow Pursuits"	Next → "Sarek"
- Star Trek: The Next Generation season 3

"The Most Toys" is the 22nd episode of the third season of the American science fiction television series Star Trek: The Next Generation, and the 70th episode of the series overall.

Set in the 24th century, the series follows the adventures of the Starfleet crew of the Federation starship Enterprise-D. In this episode, Lieutenant Commander Data (Brent Spiner) is kidnapped by an obsessive collector, who leads the Enterprise crew to believe that Data was destroyed in a shuttlecraft accident. The episode's title references a quote popular in the 1980s, "Whoever dies with the most toys wins."

== Plot ==
The Enterprise-D is called to assist the colony on planet Beta Agni II with their contaminated water supply. They meet with trader Kivas Fajo (Saul Rubinek) who happens to have the extremely rare compound needed to neutralize the contamination. The volatile substance cannot be beamed aboard, so Lieutenant Commander Data (Brent Spiner) is assigned to make several shuttle trips to collect it. Just before the final trip, Data is kidnapped and his shuttle is rigged to explode. The Enterprise crew believe he is dead and continue their mission to the colony.

Data is reactivated and met by Fajo, who explains he collects rare and valuable objects—like Data himself. The "gallery" where Data is to be displayed has a reinforced door preventing escape and Fajo himself is protected by a personal force field preventing Data from physically attacking him. Fajo asks Data whether he is capable of killing, and Data states he is programmed with "a fundamental respect for life in all its forms". Data remains defiant against Fajo's attempts to make him an object of display. Fajo shows Data a Varon-T disruptor, a weapon banned for causing an extremely painful death, and summons his assistant Varria. Only seconds away from Fajo using the disruptor on Varria does Data agree to follow Fajo's orders.

The crew mourns the loss of their friend. Picard and Riker select Worf as Data's replacement. Geordi and Wesley note that Data did not follow standard procedures prior to the explosion, suggesting something is amiss. At the contaminated colony, the Enterprise crew discover the contamination had been caused deliberately. They deduce Fajo caused the outbreak and used the cure to lure the Enterprise and Data to him.

Varria helps Data escape, but Fajo is alerted and kills Varria with the disruptor. After Data picks up Varria's disruptor, Fajo threatens to kill more of his assistants if Data doesn't comply with his demands. Fajo goads Data into shooting him, believing that his programming won't allow him to and his lack of emotions won't drive him to kill in revenge. Data coldly concludes he cannot allow Fajo to kill others and points the disruptor at Fajo. The Enterprise arrives and suddenly beams Data back aboard just as he begins to fire, preventing him from killing Fajo. Commander Riker asks why his disruptor was discharging, and Data enigmatically suggests that something may have happened during transport. Fajo is taken into custody, and all his possessions are returned to their rightful owners.

== Production ==
The episode's title comes from a popular saying found on bumper stickers and T-shirts in the 1980s which read, "He who dies with the most toys wins." The quote was originally attributed to flamboyant millionaire Malcolm Forbes. The character’s name Kivas Fajo comes from script coordinator Lolita Fatjo, and a mineral mentioned as an item Spock deals in for the episode "Errand of Mercy". Writer Shari Goodhartz was dissatisfied with the ending and wished she had been able to come up with something more clever, finding it a little too convenient. Spiner agreed with Goodhartz that Data purposely shot Fajo, but the producers wanted Data’s intentions to be kept ambiguous. Goodhartz said "If I had a chance to do it over, with all the experience I have behind me now, I would argue passionately for Data’s actions and their consequences to have been clearer, and hopefully more provocative."

David Rappaport, a well-known British dwarf actor, had originally been cast for the part of Kivas Fajo. Rappaport struggled with depression during his life, and attempted suicide shortly after filming some scenes as Fajo. (Rappaport later died by suicide on 2 May 1990, three days before the airing of this episode). Saul Rubinek was brought in to take over the role and complete the episode. Select scenes with Rappaport were included in a special In Memoriam reel on disc five of the third-season TNG Blu-ray set.

Makeup supervisor Michael Westmore had designed an alien look for Rappaport but when the role was recast there was not enough time to recreate the alien prosthetics for another actor and had to settle for a small face tattoo. Furthermore, Fajo's assistant Varria had a flatted face and antennae that came out of her forehead, that wove into an alien hairdo. Actress Jane Daly did not like wearing the makeup or the elaborate hairdo and when the costume went for approval she convinced Gene Roddenberry to remove the antennae and change the hair style. Westmore said that instead of looking alien they were left with "a woman with a flat face and an Annette Funicello hairdo" and compared the look to a car crash victim, and noted that they inserted a line into the script to cover how terrible she looked. Westmore said it was his least favorite episode of all his work on Star Trek.

Famous artwork is heavily featured in this episode, to demonstrate Fajo's taste in what he considers unique and valuable.

- Among the artifacts that Fajo has collected, there is a copy of Salvador Dalí's The Persistence of Memory. The copy was created by artist Elaine Sokoloff.
- Although it is never seen, Vincent van Gogh's The Starry Night is mentioned by the Enterprise computer as one of the artifacts collected by Fajo.
- In a small scene before the one where Fajo threatens to kill Varria with a disruptor in order to get Data to obey him, Data is looking at Leonardo da Vinci's famous Mona Lisa, trying to imitate her famously enigmatic smile.

== Reception ==
Zack Handlen of The A.V. Club gave the episode a grade "A−". Handlen wrote that in one way the episode could be considered a variation on the episode The Measure of a Man, but that it stands quite well on its own and that "subtle character exploration" of Data gives it its edge. Keith R.A. DeCandido reviewed the episode and gave it 8 out of 10, praising the ambiguous ending, and the performances of Spiner and Rubinek.

In 2014, io9 ranked "The Most Toys" as the 95th best episode of Star Trek in their list of the top 100 Star Trek episodes.

In 2021, Robert Vaux writing for Comic Book Resources, said this was a "strong episode" in season 3, and that it tested the morality of the crew.

== Home video ==
The episode was released with Star Trek: The Next Generation season three DVD box set, released in the United States on July 2, 2002. This had 26 episodes of Season 3 on seven discs, with a Dolby Digital 5.1 audio track. It was released in high-definition Blu-ray in the United States on April 30, 2013.

== Resources ==
- Star Trek The Next Generation DVD set, volume 3, disc 6, episode 2
