= Agency (film) =

1980 film directed by George Kaczender

- Directed by: George Kaczender
- Written by: Noel Hynd
- Based on: The Agency by Paul Gottlieb
- Starring: Robert Mitchum; Lee Majors; Saul Rubinek; Valerie Perrine; Alexandra Stewart
- Cinematography: Miklós Lente
- Distributed by: Jensen Farley Pictures
- Release date: 5 September 1980
- Running time: 94 minutes
- Country: Canada
- Language: English
- Budget: $4 million

Agency (known as Mind Games on video) is a 1981 Canadian thriller drama film directed by George Kaczender. The film was written by Noel Hynd.

Based on a novel by Paul Gottlieb, it is a thriller involving creative director Philip Morgan (Lee Majors) who discovers the advertising agency he works for, run by Ted Quinn (Robert Mitchum), is using subliminal advertising to manipulate a senatorial election. It features appearances by Canadian actors Saul Rubinek as a copywriter (earning a "Best Supporting Actor" Genie nomination), Jonathan Welsh as a police detective, and familiar supporting players Michael Kirby and Gary Reineke as hitmen, and Hugh Webster as a prison inmate.

The film was shot on locations in Montreal and rural Quebec.

== Home media ==
A low-resolution DVD transfer of the film was released in Australia by Flashback Entertainment (cat. 8206).

== Sources ==
- Craddock, Jim, editor. VideoHound's Golden Movie Retriever, p. 49, "The Agency" [sic]. Detroit, Michigan: Thomson Gale, 2007. ISBN 0-7876-8980-7.
- Agency at IMDb
