= Dieppe 1942 =

- Written by: Timothy Findley; William Whitehead
- Directed by: Terence Macartney-Filgate
- Music by: Rick Wilkins
- Country of origin: Canada
- Original language: English

Production
- Producer: Terence Macartney-Filgate
- Cinematography: Charles Stewart
- Editor: Thomas Berner
- Running time: 180 minutes
- Production company: Canadian Broadcasting Corporation

Original release
- Network: CBC Television
- Release: November 11, 1979

Dieppe 1942 is a Canadian television documentary film, directed by Terence Macartney-Filgate and broadcast on CBC Television in 1979. An examination of Canada's role in the Dieppe Raid of World War II, the film was written by Timothy Findley and William Whitehead.

The three-hour film was broadcast in two 90-minute parts on November 11 and 12, 1979.

The film received seven Genie Award nominations at the 1st Genie Awards in 1980, for Outstanding Documentary - 30 Minutes and Over, Direction in a Non-Feature Documentary (Macartney-Filgate), Non-Dramatic Script (Findley, Whitehead), Cinematography in a Non-Feature Documentary (Charles Stewart), Sound in a Non-Feature (Alex Taylor, Michael Lax and Austin Grimaldi), Editing in a Non-Feature (Thomas Berner) and Musical Score in a Non-Feature (Rick Wilkins). It did not win any of the awards.
