= Saul Rubinek =

Canadian actor & director (born 1948)

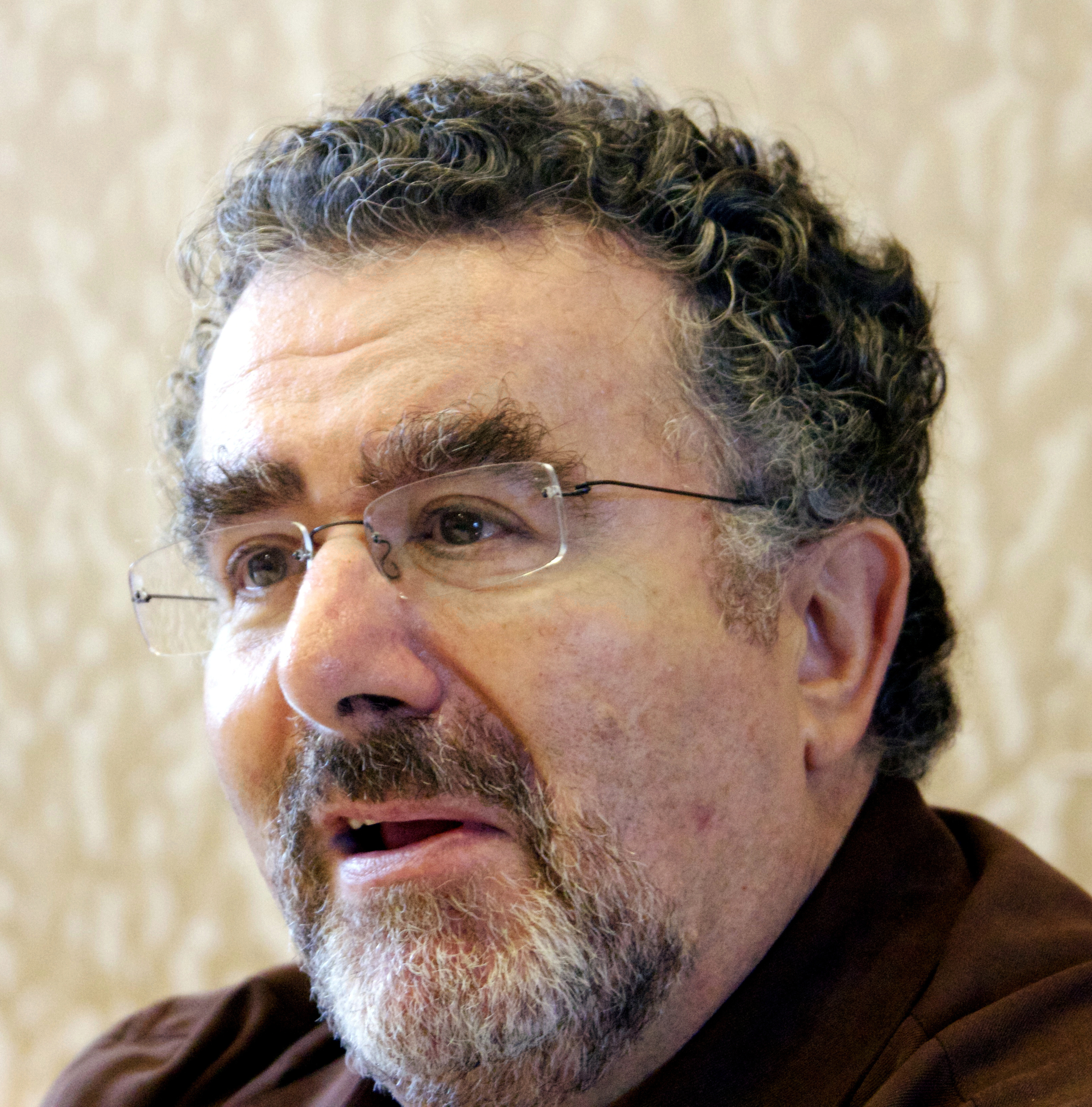
- Rubinek in 2013
- Born: Saul Hersh Rubinek; July 2, 1948 (age 78); Föhrenwald, Wolfratshausen, Upper Bavaria, Allied-occupied Germany
- Occupations: Actor; director; producer; playwright
- Years active: 1968–present
- Spouse: Elinor Reid (m. 1990)
- Partner: Kate Lynch (1976—1980s)
- Awards: See below

Saul Hersh Rubinek (born July 2, 1948) is a Canadian actor, director, producer, and playwright.

He is widely known for his television roles, notably Artie Nielsen on Warehouse 13, Donny Douglas on Frasier, Lon Cohen on A Nero Wolfe Mystery, and Louis B. Mayer on The Last Tycoon. He also starred in the films Against All Odds (1984), Wall Street (1987), The Bonfire of the Vanities (1990), Unforgiven (1992), Nixon (1995), True Romance (1993), The Express (2008), Barney's Version (2010), and The Ballad of Buster Scruggs (2018).

Rubinek is a five-time Genie Award nominee, winning Best Supporting Actor for Ticket to Heaven (1981), and a two-time Gemini Award nominee. His directorial film debut, Jerry and Tom (1998), was nominated for the Grand Jury Prize at the 1998 Sundance Film Festival. He was previously a stage actor and director, working with the Stratford Shakespeare Festival and Theatre Passe Muraille, and co-founding the Canadian Stage Company.

== Early life ==
Rubinek was born in Föhrenwald, a displaced-persons camp in Allied-occupied Germany. His parents, Frania and Israel Rubinek, were both Yiddish-speaking Polish Jews who were hidden by Polish farmers for over two years during World War II. So Many Miracles, a book written by Rubinek and published by Penguin Canada in 1988, recounts his parents' experiences in Poland during the Holocaust.

The family emigrated to Canada soon after Rubinek was born. His family settled down in Canada's capital city, Ottawa. He spoke Yiddish, French and then learned heavily accented English, which caused him to be bullied when he was in school. In his youth, he attended Camp B'nai Brith, a Jewish summer overnight camp in Sainte-Agathe-des-Monts, Quebec. At the encouragement of his parents, Rubinek began taking acting lessons and joined the Ottawa Little Theatre in 1965.

== Career ==
Rubinek began performing at the Stratford Festival in 1969. He contributed to the Toronto theatre scene, co-founding the Toronto Free Theatre (now the Canadian Stage Company) and working with Theatre Passe Muraille as an actor and producer. He began working in the United States in the 1970s, acting in Off-Broadway productions. In 1984, he won a Drama-Logue Award for Des McAnuff's La Jolla production of As You Like It.

Early in his career, Rubinek gained the attention of Canadian audiences when he starred as detective Benny Cooperman in two TV films: The Suicide Murders (1985) and Murder Sees the Light (1986). These are based on the series of mystery novels by author Howard Engel set in the Niagara Region of Canada. Rubinek starred as Owen Hughes, the antagonist, in Obsessed (1987). In the 1987 Canadian film Taking Care, he played Carl, the husband of the main protagonist, played by his then spouse Kate Lynch. It was a medical drama based on the Toronto hospital baby deaths that was the foundation of the Susan Nelles false-conviction case. In another TV film, Liberace: Behind the Music (1988), he played Seymour Heller, the long-time friend and manager of Liberace.

In 1982, Rubinek played Allan in the sex-themed romantic comedy Soup for One, directed and written by Jonathan Kaufer and produced by Marvin Worth. Rubinek appeared in: Taylor Hackford's Against All Odds (1984); Alan Alda's Sweet Liberty (1986) as director Bo Hodges; Oliver Stone's Wall Street (1987), as a lawyer; The Outside Chance of Maximilian Glick (1988), as a fun-loving rabbi; Brian De Palma's The Bonfire of the Vanities (1990), again as a lawyer; and in a lead part as a rabbi in The Quarrel (1991). He is noted for his performance in Clint Eastwood's Unforgiven (1992) as a pulp fiction writer. He had a notable role in Tony Scott's True Romance (1993) as Lee Donowitz, a pompous, cocaine-addicted film producer based on Joel Silver.

Rubinek co-starred in the 1993 Emmy Award-winning American made-for-television docudrama And the Band Played On as Dr. Jim Curran. He played the character Kivas Fajo in the Star Trek: The Next Generation episode "The Most Toys." Rubinek, an ardent Star Trek fan, took over the part on short notice after David Rappaport, the actor originally cast in the role, attempted suicide shortly after the filming of the episode had begun. (Rappaport later committed suicide just before the episode premiered.) Photographs of Rubinek in character were used on two cards in Decipher's 1994 ST:TNG card game: a character card entitled "Kivas Fajo" and an event card entitled "Kivas Fajo: Collector." In 1998, "The Fajo Collection," a limited (40,000 copies) edition set of 18 new cards, was released as an addition to this card game.

Another science fiction role portrayed by Rubinek was as a documentary film director named Emmett Bregman, on the seventh season of the Canadian-American military science fiction television series Stargate SG-1, in a two-part episode called "Heroes, Parts 1 & 2".

Rubinek played Donny Douglas (Daphne Moon's fiancé and Niles Crane's divorce lawyer) in several episodes of the American sitcom Frasier.

Rubinek appeared, in various roles, in two episodes of the 1995 revival of The Outer Limits. Rubinek played the role of Louis the Lion on YTV's The Adventures of Dudley the Dragon (1995). He had a cameo appearance as a casino pit boss in the film Rush Hour 2.

Rubinek played Alan Mintz opposite Nicolas Cage in the 2000 film The Family Man. In 2000, Rubinek played Detective Saul Panzer in The Golden Spiders: A Nero Wolfe Mystery, the series pilot for the 2001–02 A&E TV series A Nero Wolfe Mystery, in which he would subsequently play the recurring role of reporter Lon Cohen. In 2005 he appeared in the short-lived American television series Blind Justice, and has appeared from 2006 to 2012 in the supporting role of Hasty Hathaway in the Jesse Stone series of TV films, starring Tom Selleck.

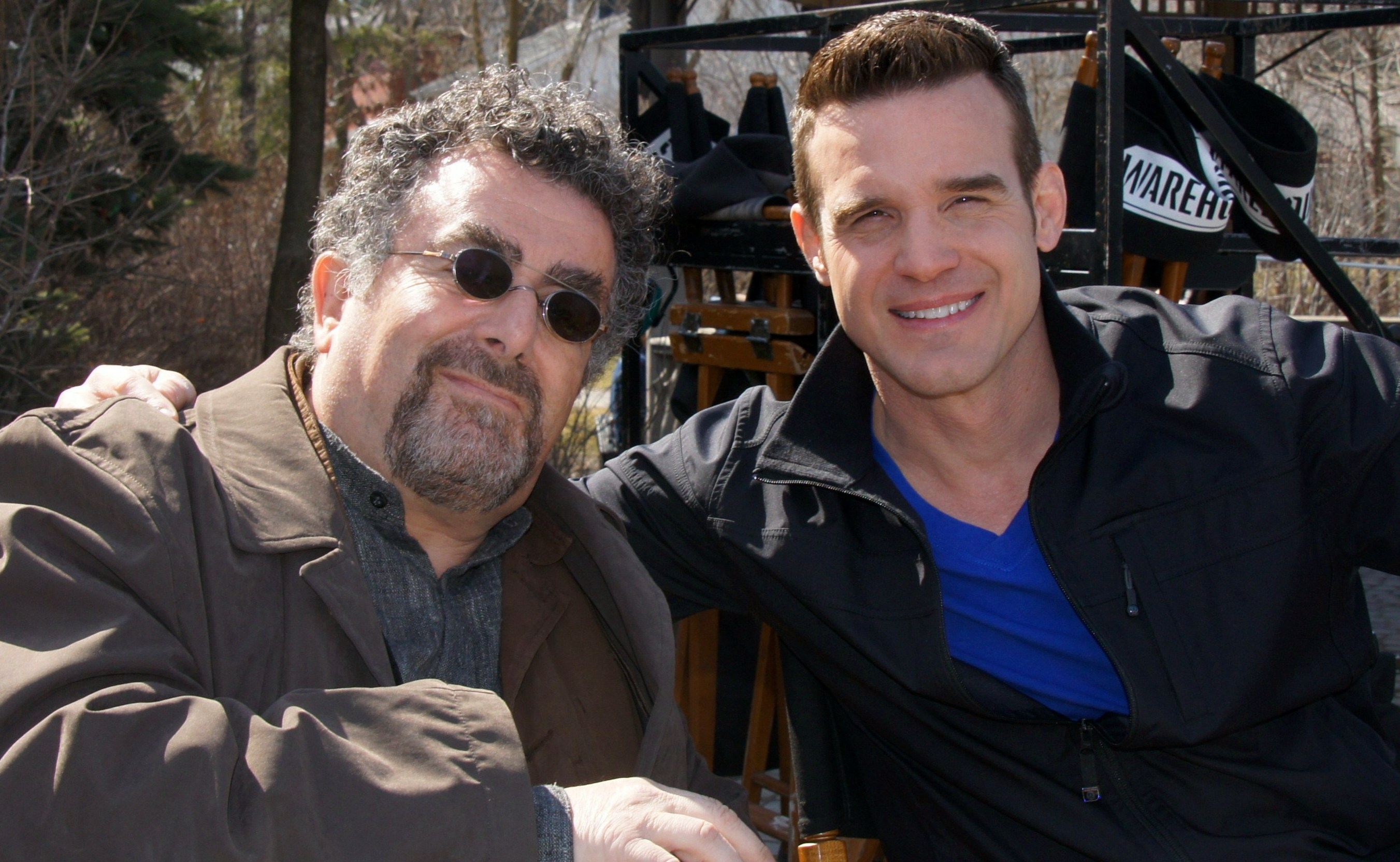
Rubinek with his Warehouse 13 costar Eddie McClintock

His single-episode guest appearances during the 2000s include two 2004 episodes of Curb Your Enthusiasm as Dr. Saul Funkhouser, the "Adrift" episode in the beginning of Lost's second season in 2005, the 2006 "Invincible" episode of Eureka, the 2007 episode of the TV series Masters of Horror "The Washingtonians", and a 2008 episode of the TV series Psych. That same year he guest-starred as Victor Dubenich, the antagonist in the pilot episode of Leverage, reappearing in 2012 for the last two episodes of season 4. In 2013, he guest-starred in two subsequent episodes of the TV series Person of Interest.

In 2005, he directed the independent film Cruel but Necessary. The following year he appeared in a supporting role in the 2009 Canadian feature comedy The Trotsky. Rubinek starred in the Syfy series Warehouse 13 as Artie Nielsen, a covert agent employed by a secretive council to recover mystical artifacts with his team. The series finale was aired on May 19, 2014, on Syfy.

His first play, Terrible Advice, premiered in September 2011 at the Menier Chocolate Factory Theatre in London, starring Scott Bakula, Sharon Horgan, Andy Nyman and Caroline Quentin. In 2018, he was cast as a series regular on the Amazon Prime series Hunters.

From October 26 to December 8, 2024 and again in April 2025, he appeared on stage in Toronto as a fictionalized version of himself as a Jewish second generation Holocaust survivor in the one act production Playing Shylock in which the Jewish actor plays a Jewish actor who portrays Shylock in a production of Merchant of Venice that is cancelled during intermission because of concerns that the play encourages antisemitism and the theatre can't guarantee security as there are demonstrators. Ironically this is the actor's dream role because Jews are rarely cast as Shylock and because the actor's late father wanted to play the role and never could.

From October 22 to December 7, 2025, Rubinek performed in Playing Shylock in its US premiere, off Broadway at the Polonsky Shakespeare Center in Brooklyn.

== Filmography ==
=== Film ===
| Year | Title | Role | Notes |
|---|---|---|---|
| 1968 | Slow Run | Narrator (voice) | Short film |
| 1980 | Death Ship | Jackie | |
| 1980 | Agency | Sam Goldstein | |
| 1980 | Nothing Personal | Pete Braden | Uncredited |
| 1981 | Ticket to Heaven | Larry | |
| 1981 | By Design | Terry Loeb | |
| 1982 | Soup for One | Allan Martin | |
| 1982 | Young Doctors in Love | Floyd Kurtzman | |
| 1982 | Highpoint | Centino | |
| 1984 | Against All Odds | Steve Kirsch | |
| 1985 | Martin's Day | Hitchhiker | |
| 1986 | Sweet Liberty | Bo Hodges | |
| 1987 | Wall Street | Harold Salt | |
| 1987 | Taking Care | Carl | |
| 1987 | Hitting Home | Owen Hughes | |
| 1988 | The Outside Chance of Maximilian Glick | Rabbi Teitelman | |
| 1990 | The Bonfire of the Vanities | Jed Kramer | |
| 1990 | Falling Over Backwards | Mel Rosenblum | |
| 1991 | The Quarrel | Hersh Rasseyner | |
| 1992 | Man Trouble | Laurence Moncrief | |
| 1992 | Unforgiven | W.W. Beauchamp | |
| 1993 | Undercover Blues | Mr. Ferderber | |
| 1993 | True Romance | Lee Donowitz | |
| 1994 | Death Wish V: The Face of Death | D.A. Brian Hoyle | |
| 1994 | I Love Trouble | Sam Smotherman | |
| 1994 | Getting Even with Dad | Bobby Drace | |
| 1995 | Nixon | Herb Klein | |
| 1996 | Memory Run | Dr. Munger | |
| 1996 | Rainbow | Sam Cohen | |
| 1997 | Bad Manners | Matt Carroll | |
| 1997 | Pale Saints | Whitey | |
| 1998 | Jerry and Tom | Dogtrack Victim | Directorial debut |
| 1999 | Dick | Henry Kissinger | |
| 2000 | Lakeboat | Cuthman | |
| 2000 | The Contender | Jerry Tolliver | |
| 2000 | The Family Man | Alan Mintz | |
| 2001 | Rush Hour 2 | Red Dragon Box Man | Cameo appearance |
| 2001 | Bleacher Bums | Chicago Bruins Manager | Also director (TV movie) |
| 2002 | Triggermen | Jazzer | |
| 2003 | The Singing Detective | Skin Specialist | |
| 2003 | Hollywood North | Paul Linder | |
| 2003 | Baadasssss! | Howie Kaufman | |
| 2004 | Pursued | Dexter O'Neill | |
| 2004 | Intern Academy | Dr. Sam Bonnert | |
| 2005 | Santa's Slay | Mr. Green | |
| 2005 | Cruel but Necessary | N/A | Also producer |
| 2007 | War | Dr. Sherman | |
| 2008 | A Broken Life | Boss | |
| 2008 | Julia | Mitch | |
| 2008 | The Express | Art Modell | |
| 2009 | Oy Vey! | Martin Hirsch | |
| 2009 | The Trotsky | David Bronstein | |
| 2010 | Barney's Version | Mr. Charnofsky | |
| 2010 | Knucklehead | Rabbi | Cameo appearance |
| 2010 | Kill Me Please | M. Breiman | |
| 2015 | Gridlocked | Marty | |
| 2018 | The Ballad of Buster Scruggs | Frenchman/René | Segment: "The Mortal Remains" |
| 2019 | The Song of Names | Mr. Feinman | |
| 2022 | Shttl | Rebbe Weitsenzang | |
| 2023 | BlackBerry | John Woodman | |
| 2023 | Clock | Joseph | |

=== Television ===
Saul Rubinek television credits
| Year | Title | Role | Notes |
|---|---|---|---|
| 1975–1977 | King of Kensington | Jerry Beck / Ansons Phelps | Episodes: "The Gambler" & "The End of the World" |
| 1978 | Love on the Nose | The Idealist | TV movie |
| 1979 | The Wordsmith | Mervyn Kaplansky | TV movie |
| 1980 | The Littlest Hobo | Tim Reagan | Episode: "Escape" |
| 1980 | Bizarre | Various characters | 24 episodes |
| 1981 | Clown White | Mr. Freed | TV movie |
| 1983 | The Terry Fox Story | Dan Grey | TV movie |
| 1984 | Seeing Things | Jeffries | Episode: "An Eye on the Future" |
| 1984 | Hill Street Blues | Armand Bittar | Episode: "Fuched Again" |
| 1985 | The Suicide Murders | Benny Cooperman | TV movie |
| 1985 | Oakmount High | Paul Green | TV movie |
| 1985–1986 | The Equalizer | Jason Masur | 3 episodes: "The Distant Fire" (S1.E8); "Dead Drop" (S1.E15); "Torn" (S1.E17) |
| 1986 | Murder Sees the Light | Benny Cooperman | TV movie |
| 1988 | The Ray Bradbury Theater | John Griffths | Episode: "Gotcha!" |
| 1988 | Liberace: Behind the Music | Seymour Heller | TV movie |
| 1988 | Street Legal | Grant Mitchell | Episode: "The Homecoming" |
| 1989 | Men | Paul Armas | 6 episodes |
| 1990 | Star Trek: The Next Generation | Kivas Fajo | Episode: "The Most Toys" |
| 1993 | Matrix | Jeremy Winter | Episode: "Collateral Damage" |
| 1993 | And the Band Played On | Dr. Jim Curran | TV movie |
| 1994 | L.A. Law | Harold Schoen | Episode: "Finish Line" |
| 1995 | Hiroshima | Dr. Leo Szilard | TV movie |
| 1995–1999 | The Outer Limits | Professor Hugaro/Aaron Zgierski | Episode: "Caught in the Act" & "Tribunal" |
| 1996 | Ink | Alan Mesnick | 22 episodes |
| 1998 | Blackjack | Thomas | TV movie |
| 1999 | The Practice | Arnold Hunter | Episodes: "Home Invasions" & "Infected" |
| 1999 | Mentors | Napoleon Bonaparte | Episodes: "Little Emperor" |
| 1999–2002 | Frasier | Donny Douglas | 15 episodes |
| 2000 | The Bookfair Murders | Martin P. Barrett | TV movie |
| 2000 | The Golden Spiders: A Nero Wolfe Mystery | Saul Panzer | TV movie |
| 2001 | Laughter on the 23rd Floor | Ira Stone | TV movie |
| 2001–2002 | Once and Again | Colin Fleischer | Episodes: "Kind of Blue" & "Chance of a Lifetime" |
| 2001–2002 | A Nero Wolfe Mystery | Lon Cohen | 10 episodes |
| 2002 | Gleason | George "Bullets" Durgom | TV movie |
| 2002 | The Brady Bunch in the White House | Sal Astor | TV movie |
| 2003 | Coast to Coast | Gary Pereira | TV movie |
| 2003 | Law & Order | Ira Simpkis | Episode: "Genius" |
| 2003 | And Starring Pancho Villa as Himself | Eli Morton | TV movie |
| 2003 | NYPD Blue | Barry Tytel | Episode: "Only Schmucks Pay Income Tax" |
| 2004 | Curb Your Enthusiasm | Dr. Saul Funkhouser | Episodes: "The Weatherman" & "The 5 Wood" |
| 2004 | Stargate SG-1 | Emmett Bregman | Episodes: "Heroes" |
| 2004 | Dr. Vegas | Jonathan Selznick | Episode: "Lust for Life" |
| 2004 | Threat Matrix | Peter Tomashevski | Episode: "19 Seconds" |
| 2004 | Call Me: The Rise and Fall of Heidi Fleiss | Paul Fleiss | TV movie |
| 2004 | Jack & Bobby | Nahum Mayhew | Episode: "Today I am a Man" |
| 2005 | Blind Justice | Dr. Alan Galloway | 7 episodes |
| 2005 | Jesse Stone: Stone Cold | Hasty Hathaway | TV movie |
| 2005 | Trump Unauthorized | Peter Wennik | TV movie |
| 2005 | Lost | Clark Finney | Episode: "Adrift" |
| 2006 | Jesse Stone: Night Passage | Hasty Hathaway | TV movie |
| 2006 | Eureka | Dr. Carl Carlson | Episode: "Invincible" |
| 2007 | Masters of Horror | Professor Harkinson | Episode: "The Washingtonians" |
| 2007 | Jesse Stone: Sea Change | Hasty Hathaway | TV movie |
| 2007 | Blackout | Sol | TV movie |
| 2008 | Psych | Lance | Episode: "Lights, Camera... Homicidio" |
| 2008 | The Trojan Horse | Rafe Kott | TV movie |
| 2008 | Boston Legal | Donald Feldcamp | Episode: "Kill, Baby, Kill" |
| 2008–2012 | Leverage | Victor Dubenich | 3 episodes |
| 2009–2014 | Warehouse 13 | Artie Nielsen | 64 episodes |
| 2010 | Rubicon | David Hadas | 2 episodes |
| 2010 | Jesse Stone: No Remorse | Hasty Hathaway | TV movie |
| 2011 | Jesse Stone: Innocents Lost | Hasty Hathaway | TV movie |
| 2012 | Jesse Stone: Benefit of the Doubt | Hasty Hathaway | TV movie |
| 2013 | Law & Order: Special Victims Unit | Mr. Price | Episode: "Funny Valentine" |
| 2013–2014 | Person of Interest | Arthur Claypool | Episodes: "Lethe" & "Aletheia" |
| 2015 | Beauty & the Beast | Dr. Glenroy | Episode: "Heart of the Matter" |
| 2015 | The Good Wife | Judge Thomas Treem | Episode: "Taxed" |
| 2016 | Angie Tribeca | Pfoopa | Episode "Boyz II Dead" |
| 2016 | Blue Bloods | Sy Goodman | Episode: "The Price of Justice" |
| 2017 | Doubt | Judge Julius Routbort | Episode: "Finally" |
| 2017 | The Last Tycoon | Louis B. Mayer | 6 episodes |
| 2017 | Survivor's Remorse | Leonard Moscowitz | Episode: "Optics" |
| 2018 | Caught | Andre Lefevre | 2 episodes |
| 2018 | Grey's Anatomy | Rabbi Eli | Episode: "One Day Like This" |
| 2018–2022 | The Marvelous Mrs. Maisel | Pauly Auerbach | Episodes: "We're Going to the Catskills!" & "Everything is Bellmore" |
| 2019 | For All Mankind | Rep. Charles Sandman | Episode: "He Built the Saturn V" |
| 2019–2020 | Billions | Hap Halloran | 3 episodes |
| 2020 | Hunters | Murray Markowitz | 10 episodes |
| 2020 | Schitt's Creek | Tippy Bernstein | Episode: "Sunrise, Sunset" |
| 2023 | FBI | David Becker | Episode: "Privilege" |
| 2025 | The Copenhagen Test | Victor Simonek | 8 episodes |

== Accolades ==
Academy of Canadian Cinema & Television

- 1980 Genie Award for Best Actor (Non-Feature): The Wordsmith (nominated)
- 1980 Genie Award for Best Supporting Actor: Agency (nominated)
- 1982 Genie Award for Best Supporting Actor: Ticket to Heaven (won)
- 1983 Genie Award for Best Supporting Actor: By Design (nominated)
- 1989 Genie Award for Best Supporting Actor: The Outside Chance of Maximilian Glick (nominated)
- 1998 Gemini Award for Best Performance by an Actor in a Featured Supporting Role in a Dramatic Program: Hiroshima (nominated)
- 1998 Genie Award for Best Supporting Actor: Pale Saints (nominated)
- 2008 Gemini Award for Best Performance by an Actor in a Featured Supporting Role in a Dramatic Program: The Trojan Horse (nominated)

Broadcast Film Critics Association

- 2001 Alan J. Pakula Award for Artistic Excellence: The Contender (won)

FilmOut LGBT Film Festival

- 2010 Audience Award for Best Supporting Actor: Oy Vey! My Son Is Gay!! (nominated)

Sundance Film Festival

- 1998 Grand Jury Prize: Jerry and Tom (nominated)
