= Chuck Shamata =

Canadian actor (born 1942)

- Born: Charles Shamata; April 26, 1942 (age 84); Toronto, Ontario, Canada
- Education: Toronto Metropolitan University
- Occupation: Actor

Charles "Chuck" Shamata (born April 26, 1942) is a Canadian actor.

== Early life and education ==
Born and raised in Toronto, he worked at Honest Ed's, and studied acting at Toronto Metropolitan University.

== Career ==
Shamata had stage roles and bit parts in film and television, before his breakthrough role in the 1969 television film Dulcima, as the love interest of Jackie Burroughs' title character. His later roles included the films Between Friends (1973), Death Weekend (1976), Welcome to Blood City (1977), Power Play (1978), I Miss You, Hugs and Kisses (1978), Stone Cold Dead (1979) and Running (1979), and guest appearances in the television series The Mod Squad, Police Surgeon, Baretta and The Littlest Hobo. In 1980 he appeared alongside Earl Pennington and Marcel Sabourin in The Mounties, Stuart Gillard's pilot for a proposed comedy series about the Royal Canadian Mounted Police, but the show was not picked up to series.

In 1981 he played the lead role in The Running Man, an episode of the CBC Television anthology series For the Record which was the first LGBT-themed television film ever to air in Canada. He won the award for Best Actor in a Non-Feature at the Bijou Awards for his performance.

Through the 1980s, he continued to appear in films such as The Devil and Max Devlin (1981), The Terry Fox Story (1983), Hyper Sapien: People from Another Star (1986), Nowhere to Hide (1987), Night Friend (1987) and Martha, Ruth and Edie (1988), and in television series such as Seeing Things, Joshua Then and Now, Sylvanian Families, Katts and Dog, Street Legal and Night Heat. In the 1990s, he appeared in films such as Princes in Exile (1990), Death Wish V: The Face of Death (1994) and Virus (1996), and on television in Bordertown, E.N.G., Scales of Justice, Due South, Traders and Wind at My Back.

In 2005, Shamata appeared as Det. Henry Messina in the short-lived Ving Rhames revival of Kojak. His most recent roles have included a regular voice role as Uncle Cheech in Fugget About It, the films The Day After Tomorrow (2004), Cinderella Man (2005), The Sentinel (2006), Flash of Genius (2008), One Week (2008), Still Mine (2012), Clown (2014) and Miss Sloane (2016), and guest appearances in the television series Cracked, Beauty and the Beast and The Art of More.

== Family ==
His son Jesse Shamata is a film and television director most noted as the creator of Gaming Show (In My Parents' Garage).

== Filmography ==
=== Film ===
Year	Title	Role	Notes
1969	Change of Mind	Second Reporter	
1973	Between Friends	Chino	
1976	Death Weekend	Harry	
1977	Welcome to Blood City	Ricardo	
1978	Power Play	Hillsman	
1978	I Miss You, Hugs and Kisses	Gershen Isen	
1979	Running	Howard	
1979	Stone Cold Dead	Sergeant Tony Colabre	
1981	Scanners	Tony	Uncredited
1981	The Devil and Max Devlin	Jerry Nadler	
1984	Unfinished Business	Carl	
1985	Joshua Then and Now	Seymour Kaplan	
1986	Hyper Sapien: People from Another Star	Patterson	
1987	Nowhere to Hide	Mike Watson	
1987	Night Friend	Jack	
1988	Martha, Ruth and Edie	Mario Cellini	
1990	Princes in Exile	Dr. Merritt	
1990	A Touch of Murder	Detective	
1994	Death Wish V: The Face of Death	Sal Paconi	
1996	Virus	Leo Burns	
1999	When Justice Fails	Captain Tanner	
1999	Alegría	The Narrator	
2000	The Spreading Ground	Captain Nieman	
2001	Getting In	Mr. Thomas	Writer and director
2002	19 Months	Rob's Dad	
2003	Behind the Red Door	Father	
2004	The Day After Tomorrow	General Pierce	
2005	Cinderella Man	Father Rorick	
2006	The Sentinel	Director Overbrook	
2008	WarGames: The Dead Code	Bill Carter	
2008	Flash of Genius	Professor Irwin	
2008	One Week	Gerald Tyler	
2008	The Two Mr. Kissels	Bill Kissel	
2012	Still Mine	Judge	
2014	Clown	Walt	
2015	Gone Tomorrow	Frank Thompson	
2016	Miss Sloane	Bill Sanford	
2019	Breakthrough	Chief Marlo	

=== Television ===
Year	Title	Role	Notes
1969	Dulcima	The Surveyor	Television film
1969	The Mod Squad	The Dispatcher	Episode: "Ride the Man Down"
1969	Adventures in Rainbow Country	Sky Pilot	Episode: "Wall of Silence"
1971	Play for Today	Bongo	Episode: "Reddick"
1972	Dr. Simon Locke	Carl Vincent	Episode: "Crossfire"
1976	Teleplay	Reinhardt	Episode: "The Italian Machine"
1976	Baretta	Lynch	Episode: "Can't Win for Losin'"
1977, 1981	For the Record	Ben Carfield	2 episodes
1979–1980	The Littlest Hobo	Jake / Grimaldi	3 episodes
1980	King of Kensington	Ray	Episode: "Good News, Bad News"
1983	The Terry Fox Story	Wilson	Television film
1983	Between Friends	Dr. Seth Simpson	Television film
1984	Seeing Things	Gary	Episode: "Someone Is Watching"
1985	Starcrossed	The Chairman	Television film
1985	In Like Flynn	Danton	Television film
1985	The Edison Twins	Coach Hinks	Episode: "The Fix"
1985	A Time to Live	Dr. Strathmore	Television film
1985	The Suicide Murders	Pete Staziak	Television film
1985–1986	Check It Out!	(various)	2 episodes
1985–1988	Night Heat	(various)	5 episodes
1986	The Right of the People	Phil Petroni	Television film
1986	Mafia Princess	Louie	Television film
1986	Act of Vengeance	Millard Atler	Television film
1987	The Kidnapping of Baby John Doe	Frank Syncroni	Television film
1987	Echoes in the Darkness	Costopoulos	2 episodes
1987	Sylvanian Families	Papa Forrest Evergreen	13 episodes
1987, 1989	Street Legal	Various roles	2 episodes
1988–1991	Katts and Dog	Al Logan	5 episodes
1989	T. and T.	Bill Stratton	Episode: "The Contender"
1989	Alfred Hitchcock Presents	Philip Bellamy	Episode: "The Man Who Knew Too Little"
1990	Uncut Gem	Max	Television film
1990	War of the Worlds	Colonel James Bradley	Episode: "Max"
1990	Counterstrike	Eric Morley	Episode: "Dealbreaker"
1990	On Thin Ice: The Tai Babilonia Story	Connie Babilonia Sr.	Television film
1990–1991	Top Cops	Various roles	2 episodes
1991	Bordertown	Frank Wilson	Episode: "Tall in the Saddle"
1991–1992	Tarzán	Roger Taft Sr.	2 episodes
1992	Tropical Heat	Ray Hampton	Episode: "Deceit"
1992	Secret Service	Teals / Rick	2 episodes
1992	E.N.G.	Vince Fonseca	Episode: "Harvest"
1993	Family of Strangers	Tim	Television film
1993	Scales of Justice		Episode "Rex v De Marigny"
1994	Kung Fu: The Legend Continues	McIllroy	Episode: "An Ancient Lottery"
1994	Due South	Captain Walsh	Episode: "Pilot"
1994	RoboCop	Richard Gless	Episode: "Midnight Minus One"
1995	The Great Defender	Dr. Arledge	Episode: "I Wuz Robbed"
1995	Almost Golden: The Jessica Savitch Story	Al Binder	Television film
1995	Ultraforce	Additional Voices	Episode: "Prime Time"
1995	Sugartime	Michael Delfano	Television film
1996	Escape Clause	Captain Vincent Nalli	Television film
1996	F/X: The Series	"Mini", The Pickpocket	Episode: "Zero Hour"
1996	Traders	The Therapist	Episode: "Dancing with Mr. D."
1996–1997	Wind at My Back	Principal Pagnutti	2 episodes
1997	A Father for Brittany	Bob Minkowitz	Television film
1998	Highlander: The Raven	Martin Foster	Episode: "So Shall Ye Reap"
1999	Twice in a Lifetime	Coach Rybeck	Episode: "Blood Brothers"
2000	La Femme Nikita	Stephan Vacek	Episode: "Kiss the Past Goodbye"
2000	The Thin Blue Lie	Vinnie	Television film
2000	Jackie Bouvier Kennedy Onassis	Pierre Salinger	Television film
2001	The Associates	Gregory Kassan	3 episodes
2001	Snap Decision	Jack Bradley	Television film
2001–2004	Doc	Paul Nichol	5 episodes
2002	Guilty Hearts	Detective Mike Virgilio	Television film
2002	Whitewash: The Clarence Brandley Story	Dan Brown	Television film
2003	DC 9/11: Time of Crisis	Hugh Shelton	Television film
2004	Crimes of Fashion	Sal Hugo	Television film
2004	Wild Card	Angelo Antonello	Episode: "Bada Bing, Bada Busiek"
2004	Saving Emily	Russo	Television film
2005	The Perfect Neighbor	Detective Lupo	Television film
2005	Kojak	Detective Henry Mussina	9 episodes
2005	The Engagement Ring	Johnny Anselmi	Television film
2007	Tipping Point	John Patterson	Television film
2007	The Dresden Files	Joe Murphy	Episode: "Second City"
2007	The Company	John Roselli	Episode #1.3
2008	ReGenesis	Eric Dixon	Episode: "Hearts and Minds"
2011	Flashpoint	Robert Logasto	Episode: "Terror"
2011	Republic of Doyle	Anton Strata	Episode: "Will the Real Des Courtney Please Stand Up?"
2012	The Listener	Charles Harrow	Episode: "Now You See Him"
2012–2016, 2024–2025	Fugget About It	Uncle Cheech	27 episodes
2013	Cracked	Officer Vince Wisnefski	2 episodes
2014	Beauty & the Beast	Freddy DeMarco	Episode: "Held Hostage"
2016	The Art of More	Howard Brannan	5 episodes
2017	Designated Survivor	Senator Charlie Krauss	Episode: "The Ninth Seat"
2019	The Hot Zone	Nancy's Father	3 episodes
2019	Good Witch	Jonathan Radford	2 episodes
2019	Blood & Treasure	Sharif Gazal	Episode: "The Brotherhood of Serapis"
