= Will Sampson =

Native American actor (1933–1987)

- Born: William Sampson Jr. September 27, 1933; Okmulgee, Oklahoma, U.S.
- Died: June 3, 1987 (aged 53); Houston, Texas, U.S.
- Resting place: Graves Creek Cemetery, Hitchita, Oklahoma
- Citizenship: United States; Muscogee Nation
- Occupations: Painter, actor, and rodeo performer
- Years active: 1975–1987
- Height: 6 ft 7 in (201 cm)

William Sampson Jr. (September 27, 1933 – June 3, 1987) was a Native American painter, actor, and rodeo performer. He was best known for his performance as the apparently mute Chief Bromden in the 1975 film One Flew Over the Cuckoo's Nest and as Crazy Horse in the 1977 western The White Buffalo, as well as his roles as Taylor in Poltergeist II: The Other Side and Ten Bears in 1976's The Outlaw Josey Wales.

== Early life ==
Sampson was born in Okmulgee County, Oklahoma to William "Wiley" Sampson Sr. and Mabel Sampson (née Lewis). He and his family were members of the Muscogee Nation.

== Career ==
=== Rodeo performer ===
Sampson competed in rodeos for about 20 years. His specialty was bronco busting, and he was on the rodeo circuit when One Flew Over the Cuckoo's Nest producers Saul Zaentz and Michael Douglas were looking for a large Native American man to play the role of Chief Bromden. Sampson stood 6 ft 7 in (201 cm) tall. Rodeo announcer Mel Lambert mentioned Sampson to them, and after lengthy efforts to find him, they hired him on the strength of an interview. Sampson's only prior acting experience was as an extra in the B-movie Crazy Mama.

=== Actor ===
Sampson's most notable roles were as Chief Bromden in One Flew Over the Cuckoo's Nest and as Chief Ten Bears The Outlaw Josey Wales and Taylor the Medicine Man in the horror film Poltergeist II. He had a recurring role on the TV series Vega$ as Harlon Twoleaf, and starred in the movies Fish Hawk, and Orca. Sampson appeared in the production of Black Elk Speaks with the American Indian Theater Company in Tulsa, Oklahoma, where David Carradine and other Native American actors (such as Wes Studi and Randolph Mantooth) have appeared in stage productions. He also played Crazy Horse in The White Buffalo with Charles Bronson and the archetypal Elevator Attendant in Nicolas Roeg's 1985 film, Insignificance.

=== Artist ===
Sampson was a visual artist. His large painting depicting the Ribbon Dance of the Muscogee (Creek) is in the collection of the Creek Council House Museum in Okmulgee, Oklahoma. His artwork has been shown at the Gilcrease Museum and the Philbrook Museum of Art. Sampson created a series of paintings entitled Escape of the Winged Mind that depicts life on the American Frontier. One painting in particular is called Buffalo Kill and can be found featured in the book Beyond Cuckoo's Nest: The Art and Life of William Sampson, Jr. His works have sold in auction houses and galleries, including the Pierson Gallery.

== Personal life ==
Sampson Jr. had at least five children.

=== Illness and death ===
Sampson suffered from scleroderma, a chronic degenerative condition that affected his heart, lungs, and skin. During his lengthy illness, his weight fell from 270 lb (120 kg) to 150 lb (68 kg), causing complications related to malnutrition. After undergoing a heart and lung transplant at Houston Methodist Hospital in Houston, he died on June 3, 1987, of post-operative kidney failure. Sampson was 53 years old.

== Legacy ==
Will Sampson Road, in Okmulgee County (east of Highway 75 near Preston, Oklahoma), is named after him.

During the filming of The White Buffalo, Sampson halted production by refusing to act when he discovered that producers had hired white actors to portray Native Americans for the film. In 1983, with assistance from his personal secretary Zoe Escobar, Sampson founded the "American Indian Registry for the Performing Arts" for Native American actors. He also served on the registry's board of directors.

== Filmography ==
=== Film ===
Year	Title	Role	Notes
1975	Crazy Mama	Indian at Trading	Uncredited
1975	One Flew Over the Cuckoo's Nest	Chief Bromden	
1976	Buffalo Bill and the Indians, or Sitting Bull's History Lesson	The Interpreter / William Halsey	
1976	The Outlaw Josey Wales	Ten Bears	
1977	The White Buffalo	Crazy Horse / Worm	
1977	Orca	Umilak	
1978	Cowboysan	Indian Chief	Short film
1979	Fish Hawk	Fish Hawk	
1985	Insignificance	Elevator Attendant	
1986	Poltergeist II: The Other Side	Taylor	
1986	Firewalker	Tall Eagle	

=== Television ===
Year	Title	Role	Notes
1977	Relentless	Sam Watchman	TV movie
1977	The Hunted Lady	Uncle George	TV movie
1978	Standing Tall	Lonny Moon	TV movie
1978–79	Vega$	Harlon Two-Leaf	6 episodes
1979	From Here to Eternity	Sgt. Cheney	Miniseries
1980	Alcatraz: The Whole Shocking Story	Clarence's Father	TV movie
1982	Born to the Wind	Painted Bear	4 episodes
1982	The Great Spirit within the Hole	Narrator	Twin Cities Public Television
1983–84	The Yellow Rose	John Strongheart	7 episodes
1984	The Mystic Warrior	Evan Freed	Miniseries
1985	Wildside	Fake Sitting Bull	Episode: "Buffalo Who?"
1986	Roanoak	Wingina	Miniseries
1986	Tall Tales & Legends	Chief	Episode: "Johnny Appleseed"
1987	The Gunfighters	Train Passenger	TV movie

== Awards and nominations ==
Institution	Year	Category	Nominated work	Result
Genie Awards	1980	Best Performance by a Foreign Actor	Fish Hawk	Nominated

== Bibliography ==
- Escobar, Zoe (2009). Beyond the Cuckoo's Nest: the Art and Life of William 'Sonny' Sampson, Jr., the Muscogee Creek Indian Cowboy, Painter and Actor Girldog Publishing, Issaquah, Washington. ISBN 978-0-615-18164-6
