= Every Child (film) =

- Directed by: Eugene Fedorenko
- Written by: Derek Lamb; Bernard Carez; Raymond Pollender
- Produced by: Derek Lamb
- Starring: Bernard Carez; Sophie Cowling; Raymond Pollender
- Cinematography: Jacques Avoine; Robert Humble; Richard Moras
- Music by: Normand Roger
- Production company: National Film Board of Canada
- Distributed by: National Film Board of Canada; UNICEF
- Release date: September 1979
- Running time: 6 minutes
- Country: Canada
- Languages: English; French
- Budget: $67,778

Every Child is an animated short film produced in 1979 by the National Film Board of Canada in association with UNICEF.

It is a film without words, incorporating sounds by Les Mîmes Électriques (The Electric Mimes).

== Plot ==
This animated short tells the story of a child rejected from every home, then found by two tramps who give her love and tenderness.

== Cast ==
- Bernard Carez
- Sophie Cowling as the Child
- Raymond Pollender

== Production ==
Every Child was a UNICEF sponsored film created by the National Film Board of Canada in order to promote the Declaration of Children's Rights. The film was directed and animated by Eugene Fedorenko and written by Derek Lamb and Les Mîmes électriques. It had a budget of $67,778 (equivalent to $278,229 in 2025). Fedorenko later lost his job at the NFB due to budgetary problems in March 1980.

== Awards ==
- In 1980 Derek Lamb won an Oscar for Best Short Film, Animated at the Academy Awards, United States
- Best Animation and Special Award, 1st Genie Awards, 1980
- In 1980 Eugene Fedorenko won the OIAF Award for First Films at the Ottawa International Animation Festival

== Works cited ==
- Evans, Gary (1991). In the National Interest: A Chronicle of the National Film Board of Canada from 1949 to 1989. University of Toronto Press. ISBN 0802027849.
