= Running (1979 film) =

- Theatrical release poster
- Directed by: Steven Hilliard Stern
- Written by: Steven Hilliard Stern
- Produced by: Robert Cooper; Ronald Cohen
- Starring: Michael Douglas; Susan Anspach
- Cinematography: Laszlo George
- Edited by: Kurt Hirschler
- Music by: André Gagnon
- Production company: CFDC
- Distributed by: Universal Pictures
- Release date: October 30, 1979 (Montreal)
- Running time: 102 minutes
- Country: Canada
- Language: English
- Budget: $4 million or $3.5 million
- Box office: $6 million

Running is a 1979 Canadian sports drama film written and directed by Steven Hilliard Stern and starring Michael Douglas and Susan Anspach. It is about the fictional American marathon runner and Olympic hopeful Michael Andropolis and his struggle to compete in the Olympic Games.

== Plot ==
Michael Andropolis is a US hopeful for the 1976 (Montreal) Summer Olympics as a marathon runner. However, his life is fraught with trouble. His marriage, which produced two children, has fallen apart and his wife wants a divorce. He struggles with unemployment and at one point in the movie is seen snapping due to frustration with the unemployment office bureaucracy. Additionally, his coach is reluctant to endorse him for the games. Andropolis always starts races strong, but because of his over-competitive strive, he pulls ahead of the pack too soon, sapping strength he'll need for the final minutes of the race. So he tends to not come in first, having used his stamina too early. His coach feels he is a quitter.

However, he providentially makes it through to Montreal by finishing fourth in the qualifiers, but getting the ticket due to an injury in one of the top three finishers. Andropolis surprises everyone, by pacing himself early in the race, only pulling ahead halfway through the race. Well on his way to the finish line ahead of the main pack, Andropolis slips on wet leaves rounding a turn. The fall leaves him with shoulder and leg injuries as other runners pass him by.

As darkness falls, paramedics tend to him where he fell. Andropolis is overcome by the need to "finish" the task of the race. He gets up, limping by and winding his way through traffic on roads that have been re-opened, as the marathon rules mark, and since the presumed final competitor had crossed the finish line hours earlier. Exhausted by the grueling ordeal of finishing the race with numerous injuries, Andropolis is greeted with cheers and support from the entire Olympic Stadium. He is met at the finish line by his wife, who has come to Montreal to watch him and promises that he will come home with her whatever happens. His coach witnesses his finish with a proud smile, while his daughters watch him on TV.

== Cast ==
- Michael Douglas as Michael Andropolis
- Susan Anspach as Janet Andropolis
- Chuck Shamata as Howard Grant
- Eugene Levy as Richard Rosenberg
- Philip Akin as Chuck
- Gordon Clapp as Kenny
- Lawrence Dane as Coach Walker
- Lesleh Donaldson as Andrea Andropolis
- Robin Duke as Olympic Office Receptionist
- David Eisner as Man In Unemployment Office
- Giancarlo Esposito as Teenager
- Marvin Goldhar as Maloney
- Robert Hannah as Stuntman
- Shawn Lawrence as Kenny's Trainer
- Jim McKay as Himself
- Jennifer McKinney as Susan Andropolis
- Monica Parker as Fat Lady
- Tony Rosato as Italian Athlete
- Murray Westgate as Mr. Finlay
- Trudy Young as Pregnant Woman

== Production ==
Many of the scenes including the start of the marathon as well as scenic shots were filmed in Georgetown, Ontario, Canada.

Additional scenes were filmed at Lakeshore Studio in Toronto, Ontario; Montreal, Quebec; and New York City.

The film was made for $4 million and sold to TV for $5 million even before it was released.

== Reception ==
Vincent Canby of The New York Times described the film as "earnest but not particularly affecting." Variety wrote: "Scriptwriter Steven Stern, who directed, never really capitalizes on the sport of running which has become so popular, but Douglas overcomes to deliver a polished performance." Gene Siskel of the Chicago Tribune gave the film one star out of four and called it "easily one of the year's worst movies ... This picture was made by a TV writer-director, and it shows." Charles Champlin of the Los Angeles Times wrote that the film was "enlivened by some outstanding performances," but also stated that "I didn't get any real sense of the pain or the glory, the mystique or the physicality or the mechanics of running ... and it presents difficulties in a film called 'Running.'" Gary Arnold of The Washington Post described the film as "insufferable ... this sporting tearjerker is the dopiest imitation yet of 'Rocky,' already imitated into absurdity." James K. Loutzenhiser of BoxOffice gave the film a rating of "Good" and called it "an entertaining film" with Douglas "likable and convincing in the leading role." Lawrence O'Toole of Maclean's wrote, "A formula movie, nicely shot by Laszlo George and acted with real vigor by Douglas, Running is Television City, its script easily accessible to any prime-time child."

== See also ==
- List of films about the sport of athletics
