= Fish Hawk (film) =

- DVD Cover
- Directed by: Donald Shebib
- Screenplay by: Blanche Hanalis
- Based on: Old Fish Hawk by Mitchell Jayne
- Starring: Will Sampson; Charles Fields
- Cinematography: René Verzier
- Edited by: Ron Wisman
- Music by: Samuel Matlovsky
- Production company: Canadian Film Development Corporation (CFDC)
- Distributed by: AVCO Embassy Pictures
- Release date: August 22, 1979 (Moscow)
- Running time: 94 minutes
- Country: Canada
- Language: English
- Budget: $2 million

Fish Hawk is a 1979 Canadian drama film directed by Donald Shebib. The screenplay was written by Blanche Hanalis, based on the novel Old Fish Hawk by Mitchell Jayne. The film was nominated for several Genie Awards including for direction, editing and best performance by a foreign actor. It was also entered into the 11th Moscow International Film Festival.

The film sold to US TV for $1.5 million.

== Plot ==
A young boy befriends a Native American man who has become an alcoholic after the death of his wife and children from small pox.

== Principal cast ==
Actor	Role
Will Sampson	Fish Hawk
Don Francks	Deut Boggs
Charles Fields	Corby Boggs
Mary Pirie	Sarah Boggs
Karen Austin	Mrs. Gideon
Allan Royal	Will Fellows
Michael J. Reynolds	Mr. Gideon
Chris Wiggins	Marcus Boggs

== Filming locations ==
- Kleinburg, Ontario and Forks of the Credit, Ontario

== Critical reception ==
Vincent Canby of The New York Times did not give high praise to the film:

It's not quite a nature film, but it's not strong enough to be classified as an adventure... The performances are adequate but never for a minute especially affecting.
