= Nails (1979 film) =

1979 film

- Opening titles
- Directed by: Phillip Borsos
- Produced by: John Taylor
- Cinematography: Ron Orieux
- Edited by: Raymond Hall
- Music by: Michael Conway Baker
- Distributed by: National Film Board of Canada
- Release date: 1979
- Running time: 13 minutes
- Country: Canada
- Language: English

Nails is a 1979 Canadian short documentary film directed by Phillip Borsos. It was nominated for an Academy Award for Best Documentary Short, and was named Best Theatrical Short in 1980 at the 1st Genie Awards.

== Synopsis ==
A blacksmith is seen labouring at his forge, shaping nails from single strands of steel rods. The scene shifts from this peaceful setting to the roar of a 20th-century nail mill, where banks of machines draw, cut and pound the steel rods faster than the eye can follow.
