= Françoise Faucher =

Canadian actress (born 1929)

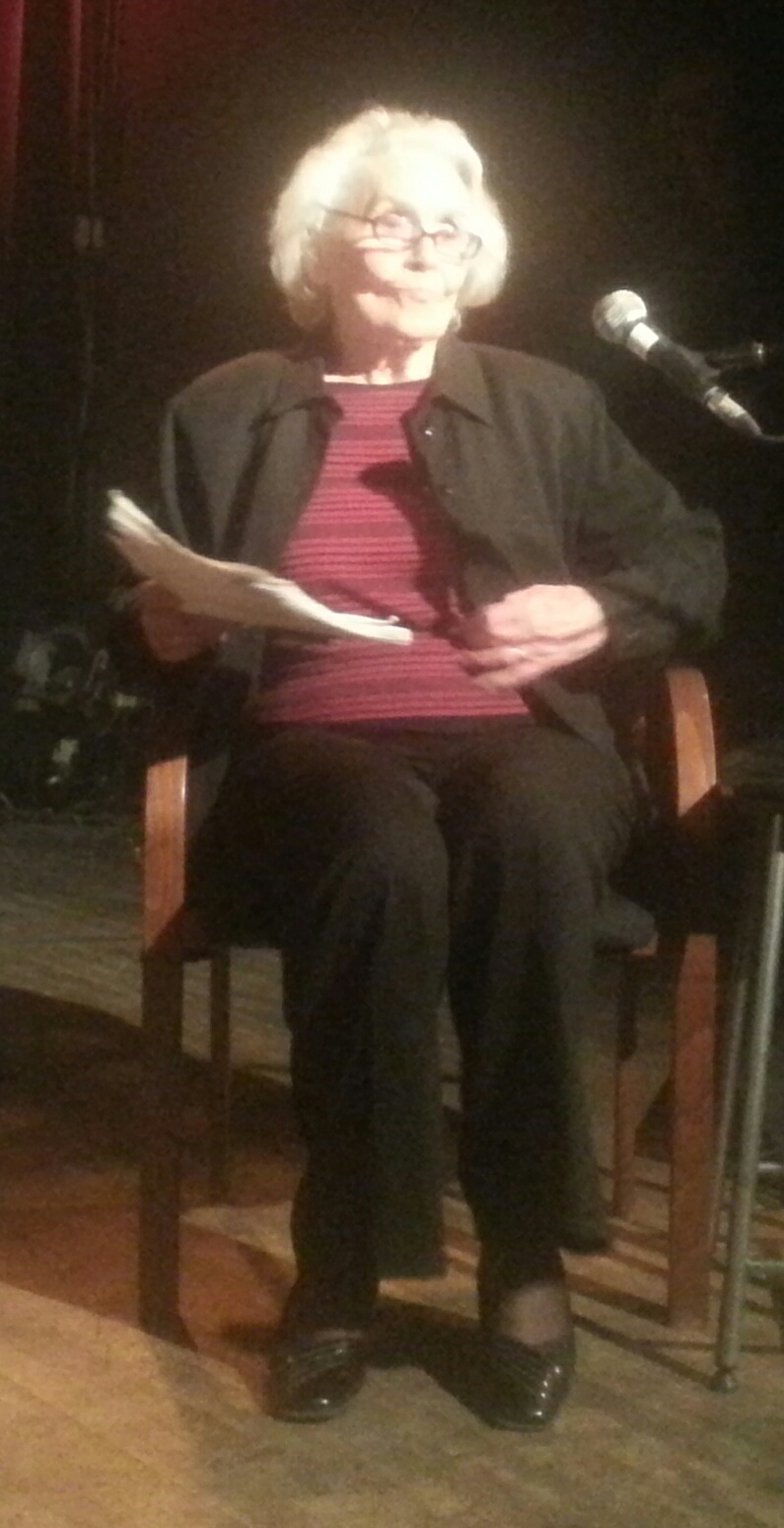
- Faucher at Cabaret Lion D'Or
- Born: 4 September 1929 (age 97); Montmorency, France
- Occupation: Actress

Françoise Faucher O.C. (born 1929 in Montmorency, France) is a French actress. She trained in drama in France under René Simon and Bernard Bimont before immigrating to Canada in the 1950s. She became a member of Montreal's Théâtre du Nouveau Monde, participating in many plays. She wrote scripts for radio and TV programs, sparking off a productive career as a moderator. Although most of her work has been in live theatre, her credits include many French-Canadian TV series such as: Les Mont-Joye, Les Bergers, La pension Velder, etc. Faucher was appointed an Officer of the Order of Canada in 1982. In 2010, she received the Governor General's Performing Arts Award.
