= The Newcomers (miniseries) =

- Original title screen
- Genre: Historical drama
- Theme music composer: Hagood Hardy
- Country of origin: Canada
- Original language: English
- No. of episodes: 7

Production
- Executive producer: Gordon Hinch
- Producers: Richard Nielsen and Pat Ferns
- Production location: Various locations across Canada
- Running time: 60 minutes

Original release
- Network: CBC
- Release: 20 November 1977 – 19 November 1979

The Newcomers is a series of seven hour-long Canadian television specials that aired from 1977 to 1979 on CBC Television. These dramas explored the theme of Canada as a nation built by immigrants, spanning from the era before Canada was founded until modern times. The series was sponsored by Imperial Oil to mark the company's 100th anniversary in 1980. The series was produced by Nielsen-Ferns. McClelland and Stewart published a related book in 1979.

A French version aired on Radio-Canada with the title Les Arrivants.

The opening theme music for the series was composed by Hagood Hardy.

== Episodes ==
No.	Title	Directed by	Written by	Original release date
1	"Prologue"	Eric Till	Charles Israel	20 November 1977
Filmed in British Columbia, this opening episode focused on the Tsimshiam, and told the story of Ksaweal's rite of passage and test before becoming the chief.
2	"1847"	Eric Till	Alice Munro	8 January 1978
This episode was about Mary Thompson Norris (Linda Goranson), a woman who left Ireland for North America to join her husband (David McIlwraith) who had left some time earlier, only to have him die of cholera by the time she arrived. Sean McCann plays McConnell and Ian D. Clark also appears.
3	"1740"	Claude Fournier	Story by : Guy Fournier; Teleplay by : Claude Fournier	19 March 1978
Set in what is now Quebec, this story is about Nicholas de Lugny (played by Michel Côté), a soldier bearing the hardships of a new land and learning how to live as a pioneer in New France.
4	"1832"	John McGreevy	Timothy Findley	10 December 1978
A look at John Symons (played by Kenneth Welsh), a Scottish radical who works against the adversity of settling Canada, and takes advantage of what opportunities are available to him to become a wealthy landowner. Chris Wiggins makes an appearance in this episode.
5	"1911"	Eric Till	Story by : Richard Nielsen; Teleplay by : Timothy Findley	18 February 1979
Hans and Camila Nielsen are the subject of this installment. They emigrated from Denmark to a company town in New Brunswick. Guest starring Hollis McLaren as Camilla and R.H. Thomson as Hans. Fiona Reid also appears.
6	"1927"	René Bonnière	Story by : George Ryga; Teleplay by : George Ryga and Charles Israel	11 March 1979
John Lypa, a Ukrainian homesteader in Saskatchewan, suffers through the Depression. While he has to look for work as a labourer, his young wife takes care of the farm. After she dies, their son is placed with relatives in the city, and Lepa is left embittered and alone. This episode is set both in the present of the 1970s and the 1920s in flashback sequences. Ken Pogue plays the Older Lypa while Duncan Regehr plays the Younger Lypa as seen in flashbacks.
7	"The Present (aka 1978)"	René Bonnière	Story by : David Humphreys; Teleplay by : Douglas Bowie	19 November 1979
The story of an Italian family in Toronto, and the clash of old world, rural values with those of a modern, city-centred society. Filmed in and around Toronto and in Italy in Opi, Abruzzo. Guest starring Bruno Gerussi of The Beachcombers. Also appearing were two semi-regulars of King of Kensington Ardon Bess and Bob Vinci.

All seven episodes were re-aired between 12 March and 2 April 1980.
