= Paperland: The Bureaucrat Observed =

- Directed by: Donald Brittain
- Written by: Donald Brittain; Ronald Blumer; John T. Random
- Produced by: Donald Brittain; Marin Canell
- Narrated by: Donald Brittain
- Cinematography: Douglas Kiefer; Barry Perles
- Edited by: Richard Todd
- Distributed by: National Film Board of Canada
- Release date: 1979
- Running time: 58 minutes
- Country: Canada
- Language: English

Paperland: The Bureaucrat Observed is a 1979 documentary film critiquing bureaucracy, written and directed by Donald Brittain and produced by the National Film Board of Canada and CBC-TV.

== Genie Awards ==
Paperland: The Bureaucrat Observed won four awards at the 1st Genie Awards and was nominated for two more. This was despite the fact that the NFB did not submit the film to the Academy of Canadian Cinema and Television, with Brittain paying the entry fee and shipping charges himself.

== 2007 International Documentary Filmfestival Amsterdam ==
Every year, the IDFA gives an acclaimed filmmaker the chance to screen his or her personal Top 10 favorite films. In 2007, Iranian filmmaker Maziar Bahari selected Paperland: The Bureaucrat Observed for his top ten classics from the history of documentary.
