= Lawrence O'Toole (journalist) =

Lawrence O'Toole is a Canadian former journalist, best known as a film, dance and theatre critic for The Globe and Mail and Maclean's in the 1970s and 1980s. After moving to New York City in 1988, he was a contributor to Time, Entertainment Weekly, GQ and The New York Times, and volunteered for an AIDS service organization. In 1994, he published Heart's Longing: Newfoundland, New York and the Distance Home, a memoir of his experience growing up in Newfoundland and Labrador, coming out as gay as an adult, and later returning to his hometown of Renews for a visit. The book was an expansion of an article he had previously written for Saturday Night.

He also published at least one short story, "Goin' to Town with Katie Ann", which was featured in the 1990 Journey Prize anthology.
