= Revolution's Orphans =

- Directed by: John N. Smith
- Written by: Laszlo Gefin; John N. Smith; János Szanyi
- Produced by: Rob Iveson, Roman Kroitor
- Starring: Rudi Lipp; Bronwen Mantel
- Cinematography: David De Volpi
- Production company: National Film Board
- Distributed by: National Film Board
- Release date: 1979
- Running time: 27 minutes
- Country: Canada
- Language: English

Revolution's Orphans is a 1979 Canadian short film, produced by the National Film Board of Canada and directed by John N. Smith. It is about a man who flees Hungary, with his daughter Clara, for Canada as the 1956 Hungarian Revolution happens. They feel regret for abandoning their homeland—until Clara's uncle Janos arrives.

The film won the Bronze Hugo, Short Subject-Drama at the 1979 Chicago International Film Festival. It earned six Genie Award nominations; Rudi Lipp won the Genie Award for Outstanding Performance by an Actor (Non-Feature).
