= Kate Lynch =

Canadian actor, theatre director and playwright

- Born: June 29, 1959 (age 67)
- Occupations: Actor; theatre director; playwright; drama teacher

Kate Lynch (born June 29, 1959) is a Canadian actor, drama teacher, theatre director and playwright.

== Biography ==
In 1980 she won the Genie Award for Best Actress for Meatballs. She was noted for her strong performance as a romantic foil to Bill Murray. However, in her acceptance speech, she communicated the belief that she had won the award more for being a Canadian actor in a popular film, at a time when Canadian films still predominantly cast bigger-name stars from the United States, than for her actual performance.

She was nominated for the same award in 1988 for her role in Taking Care; although she did not win, she told the press that being nominated for that film meant more to her than winning for Meatballs, as by this time the quality of Canadian film had significantly improved and the division of the Genie acting categories into separate awards for Canadian and foreign actors had been discontinued.

Her other film credits include Lie with Me, Soup for One, Def-Con 4, God Bless the Child, and The Guardian, while her television credits include Custard Pie, Anne of Avonlea and guest roles in Adderly, Danger Bay, Seeing Things, Queer as Folk, This Is Wonderland, Lost Girl, and Degrassi: The Next Generation.

As a playwright, her plays include Newcomer, Ten Minute Play: The Musical, The Road to Hell (co-written with Michael Healey), Tales of the Blonde Assassin, and Early August.

As a director, she has directed plays for the Shaw Festival, the Stratford Festival, the Blyth Festival, and Theatre Passe Muraille, including productions of William Shakespeare's Henry V, A Midsummer Night's Dream, Pericles, and Cymbeline, Samuel Beckett's Waiting for Godot, Terence Rattigan's French Without Tears, Noël Coward's Star Chamber, Eve Ensler's The Vagina Monologues and Michael Healey's The Nuttalls.

She has taught for University of Toronto, the Shaw Festival, the Stratford Festival, George Brown College, and Ryerson University.

== Filmography ==
=== Film ===
Year	Title	Role	Notes
1979	Meatballs	Roxanne	
1979	Summer's Children	Kathy	
1980	Nothing Personal	Audrey Seltzer	
1983	Skullduggery	Janet	
1985	Def-Con 4	Jordan	
1987	Taking Care	Angie	
1989	Eddie and the Cruisers II: Eddie Lives!	Lyndsay Caputo	
1992	The Shower	Sheila	
2003	The Republic of Love	Dr. French	
2003	Masterpiece Monday	Vivian	Short
2005	Lie with Me	Marla	
2010	New Year	Carla Cook	
2011	The Fair Sex	Kim	Short
2014	The Box	Woman	Short
2016	Acting Up	Missy Taylor	Short

=== Television ===
Year	Title	Role	Notes
1977	Custard Pie	Sheila Ann Murphy	TV series
1978	For the Record	Becky	"Cementhead"
1979	The Littlest Hobo	Susan	"Smoke"
1980	A Population of One	Marg	
1984	Seeing Things	Edna	"An Eye on the Future"
1984	The Guardian	Fran	TV film
1985	The Edison Twins	Diane Comstock	"Running on Empty"
1985	Murder in Space	Eleanor	TV film
1985	Murder: By Reason of Insanity	Eleanor Sterling	TV film
1986	Reckless Disregard	Lauren Gartner	TV film
1986	Easy Prey	Fran Altman	TV film
1986	Murder Sees the Light	Eleanor Sterling	TV film
1986-87	Danger Bay	Dr. Woodward	"The Ultimate Gift", "Time Out"
1987	Adderly	Dr. Cook	"Nemesis"
1987	Anne of Avonlea	Pauline Harris	TV miniseries
1987	Sadie and Son	Angela Pedroza	TV film
1987	Night Heat	Sally Koretski	"The Victim"
1987	Street Legal	Anne Madison	"Gold Rush"
1988	The Ray Bradbury Theater	Alicia Hart	"Gotcha!"
1988	God Bless the Child	Carrie	TV film
1988	The Twilight Zone	Claire	"Acts of Terror"
1991	Maniac Mansion	Erlene	"Brainiac Mansion"
1991	Road to Avonlea	Theodora Dixon	"It's Just a Stage"
1991	Counterstrike	Maureen	"Tie a Yellow Ribbon"
1991	Street Legal	Daria Roberts	"Reasonable Doubt"
1992	Amy Fisher: My Story	Roseann Fisher	TV film
1993	E.N.G.	Dr. Claire Shemko	"Pandora's Box"
1993	X-Rated	Louise Foster	TV film
1994	Lives of Girls and Women	Greta Storey	TV film
1996	The Haunting of Lisa	Ann	TV film
2003	Coast to Coast	Nessle Carroway	TV film
2003	Doc	Mrs. Stoddard	"Angels in Waiting"
2004	Open Heart	Violet Wells	TV film
2004	Fungus the Bogeyman	Septic	TV series
2005	This Is Wonderland	Barbara Spiddick	"2.3", "2.9"
2008	Of Murder and Memory	Anna	TV film
2011	Lost Girl	Baba Yaga	"Mirror, Mirror"
2012	Degrassi: The Next Generation	Dr. Frank	"Need You Now: Part 2"
2015	Saving Hope	Dr. Clara Levine	"Beasts of Burden"

=== Theatre ===
Year	Title	Company	Role	Ref.
2000	Smudge by Alex Bulmer	Nightwood Theatre		
