= Janet Ward =

American actress

- Born: February 19, 1925; New York City, New York, U.S.
- Died: August 2, 1995 (aged 70); Manhattan, New York City, New York, U.S.
- Occupation: Actress
- Years active: 1953–1992

Janet Ward (February 19, 1925 – August 2, 1995) was an American actress. She appeared in the films Fail Safe (1964), The Anderson Tapes (1971) and Night Moves (1975). She appeared in the television series Alfred Hitchcock Presents, Perry Mason, The Defenders, N.Y.P.D., Cannon, Barney Miller, Kojak and Law & Order.

She died of a heart attack on August 2, 1995, in Manhattan, New York City, New York at age 70.

== Filmography ==
Year	Title	Role	Notes
1955	Alfred Hitchcock Presents	Ethel Montgomery	Season 1 Episode 8: "Our Cook's a Treasure"
1964	Fail Safe	Mrs. Grady	
1971	The Anderson Tapes	Mrs. Bingham	
1975	Night Moves	Arlene Iverson	

She appeared in season 6, episode 7 of Perry Mason playing guest character, Freda Chase.
