= Genie Awards =

Canadian film awards (1980–2012)

- Awarded for: Best film productions in Canada
- Country: Canada
- Presented by: Academy of Canadian Cinema and Television
- First award: 1980
- Final award: 2012
- Website: genieawards.ca (defunct)
- Related: Canadian Screen Awards

The Genie Awards were given out annually by the Academy of Canadian Cinema and Television to recognize the best of Canadian cinema from 1980–2012. They succeeded the Canadian Film Awards (1949–1978). In 2013, the Academy merged the Genie Awards with its sister presentation for television, the Gemini Awards, to form the Canadian Screen Awards.

Genie Award candidates were selected from submissions made by the owners of Canadian films or their representatives, based on the criteria laid out in the Genie Rules and Regulations booklet which were distributed to Academy members and industry members. Peer-group juries, assembled from volunteer members of the Academy, met to watch the submissions and select a group of nominees. Academy members then voted on these nominations.

== Broadcasting ==
The Genie Awards were aired by CBC from 1980 to 2003, before moving to CHUM Limited's networks (Citytv, Bravo! and Star!). After CTVglobemedia purchased CHUM Limited, the Genie Awards moved to Canwest Global's E and IFC for 2008. The last two Genie Awards (2011–2012) were broadcast by the CBC.

== Awards ceremonies ==
Listing of all Genie Awards ceremonies:

Ceremony	Date	Host(s)	Venue	Best Motion Picture Winner	Best Performance by an Actor in a Leading Role	Best Performance by an Actress in a Leading Role
Canadian Film Awards prior to 1980
1st Genie Awards	March 20, 1980	Bruno Gerussi	Royal Alexandra Theatre, Toronto	The Changeling	Christopher Plummer	Kate Lynch
2nd Genie Awards	March 12, 1981	Brian Linehan	Royal Alexandra Theatre, Toronto	Good Riddance (Les Bons débarras)	Thomas Peacocke	Marie Tifo
3rd Genie Awards	March 3, 1982	Brian Linehan	Royal Alexandra Theatre, Toronto	Ticket to Heaven	Nick Mancuso	Margot Kidder
4th Genie Awards	March 23, 1983	Dave Thomas	Royal Alexandra Theatre, Toronto	The Grey Fox	Donald Sutherland	Rae Dawn Chong
5th Genie Awards	March 21, 1984	Louis Del Grande	Royal Alexandra Theatre, Toronto	The Terry Fox Story	Eric Fryer	Martha Henry
6th Genie Awards	March 21, 1985	Al Waxman and Kerrie Keane	Metro Toronto Convention Centre, Toronto	The Bay Boy	Gabriel Arcand	Louise Marleau
7th Genie Awards	March 20, 1986	Leslie Nielsen and Catherine Mary Stewart	Metro Toronto Convention Centre, Toronto	My American Cousin	John Wildman	Margaret Langrick
8th Genie Awards	March 18, 1987	Helen Shaver, Linda Sorensen and Jean LeClerc	Metro Toronto Convention Centre, Toronto	The Decline of the American Empire (Le Déclin de l'empire américain)	Gordon Pinsent	Martha Henry
9th Genie Awards	March 22, 1988	Gordon Pinsent and Megan Follows	Metro Toronto Convention Centre, Toronto	Night Zoo (Un Zoo la nuit)	Roger Lebel	Sheila McCarthy
10th Genie Awards	March 22, 1989	Dave Thomas	Westin Harbour Castle Hotel Toronto	Dead Ringers	Jeremy Irons	Jackie Burroughs
11th Genie Awards	March 20, 1990	Brian Linehan	Metro Toronto Convention Centre, Toronto	Jesus of Montreal (Jésus de Montréal)	Lothaire Bluteau	Rebecca Jenkins
12th Genie Awards	November 26, 1991	Leslie Nielsen	Pantages Theatre, Toronto	Black Robe	Rémy Girard	Pascale Montpetit
13th Genie Awards	November 22, 1992	Leslie Nielsen	Metro Toronto Convention Centre, Toronto	Naked Lunch	Tony Nardi	Janet Wright
14th Genie Awards	December 12, 1993	Marc Labrèche	Société Radio-Canada Studio 42, Montreal	Thirty-Two Short Films About Glenn Gould	Tom McCamus	Sheila McCarthy
15th Genie Awards	December 7, 1994	Graham Greene	Metro Toronto Convention Centre, Toronto	Exotica	Maury Chaykin	Sandra Oh
16th Genie Awards	January 14, 1996	CBC: Mary Walsh SRC: Pascale Bussières and René Homier-Roy	Société Radio-Canada Studio 42, Montreal	The Confessional (Le Confessionnal)	David La Haye	Helena Bonham Carter
17th Genie Awards	November 27, 1996	Rebecca Jenkins and Mark Farrell	The Guvernment, Toronto	Lilies	William Hutt	Martha Henry
18th Genie Awards	December 14, 1997	Cameron Bailey and Geoff Pevere	The Westin Harbour Castle, Toronto	The Sweet Hereafter	Ian Holm	Molly Parker
19th Genie Awards	February 4, 1999	Albert Schultz	The Living Arts Centre, Mississauga	The Red Violin	Roshan Seth	Sandra Oh
20th Genie Awards	January 30, 2000	Patrick McKenna	Metro Toronto Convention Centre, Toronto	Sunshine	Bob Hoskins	Sylvie Moreau
21st Genie Awards	January 29, 2001	Brian Linehan	Metro Toronto Convention Centre, Toronto	Maelström	Tony Nardi	Marie-Josée Croze
22nd Genie Awards	February 7, 2002	Brian Linehan	Metro Toronto Convention Centre, Toronto	Atanarjuat: The Fast Runner	Brendan Fletcher	Élise Guilbault
23rd Genie Awards	February 13, 2003	Arsinée Khanjian and Peter Keleghan	Metro Toronto Convention Centre, Toronto	Ararat	Luc Picard	Arsinée Khanjian
24th Genie Awards	May 1, 2004	Scott Thompson	Metro Toronto Convention Centre, Toronto	The Barbarian Invasions (Les Invasions barbares)	Rémy Girard	Sarah Polley
25th Genie Awards	March 21, 2005	Andrea Martin	Metro Toronto Convention Centre, Toronto	The Triplets of Belleville	Roy Dupuis	Pascale Bussières
26th Genie Awards	March 13, 2006	Lisa Ray and Terry David Mulligan	The Carlu, Toronto	C.R.A.Z.Y.	Michel Côté	Seema Biswas
27th Genie Awards	February 13, 2007	Lucie Laurier and Terry David Mulligan	The Carlu, Toronto	Bon Cop, Bad Cop	Roy Dupuis	Julie Le Breton
28th Genie Awards	March 3, 2008	Sandra Oh	Metro Toronto Convention Centre, Toronto	Away From Her	Gordon Pinsent	Julie Christie
29th Genie Awards	April 4, 2009	Dave Foley	Canada Aviation Museum, Ottawa	Passchendaele	Natar Ungalaaq	Ellen Burstyn
30th Genie Awards	April 12, 2010		The Guvernment/Kool Haus Entertainment Complex, Toronto, Ontario	Polytechnique	Joshua Jackson	Karine Vanasse
31st Genie Awards	March 10, 2011	William Shatner	National Arts Centre, Ottawa	Incendies	Paul Giamatti	Lubna Azabal
32nd Genie Awards	March 8, 2012	George Stroumboulopoulos	Westin Harbour Castle Hotel, Toronto, Ontario	Monsieur Lazhar	Mohamed Fellag	Vanessa Paradis
Canadian Screen Awards from 2013

=== Awards presented until 2012 ===
- Best Motion Picture
- Best Actor
- Best Actress
- Best Supporting Actor
- Best Supporting Actress
- Best Director
- Best Original Screenplay
- Best Adapted Screenplay
- Best Cinematography
- Best Art Direction/Production Design
- Best Costume Design
- Best Editing
- Best Overall Sound
- Best Sound Editing
- Best Visual Effects
- Best Make-Up
- Best Original Song
- Best Original Score
- Best Feature Length Documentary
- Best Short Documentary
- Best Live Action Short Drama
- Best Animated Short
- Golden Reel

=== Awards retired before 2012 ===
- Best Performance by a Foreign Actor: 1980 to 1983
- Best Performance by a Foreign Actress: 1980 to 1983
- Outstanding TV Drama Under 30 Minutes: 1980 only
- Outstanding Independent Film: 1980 only
- Outstanding Performance by an Actor (Non-Feature): 1980 to 1981
- Outstanding Performance by an Actress (Non-Feature): 1980 to 1981
- Outstanding Art Direction (Non-Feature): 1980 only
- Outstanding Cinematography in a Dramatic Film (Non-Feature): 1980 only
- Outstanding Cinematography in a Documentary (Non-Feature Film): 1980 only
- Outstanding Editing in a Dramatic Film (Non-Feature): 1980 only
- Outstanding Original Music Score (Non-Feature Film): 1980 only
- Outstanding Non-Dramatic Script: 1980 only
- Outstanding Sound in a Non-Feature Film: 1980 only

== Special Achievement Genie ==
The Special Achievement Genie is an award occasionally given to an individual or individuals in recognition of lifetime achievement or an important career milestone. The Special Achievement Genie is a special award given irregularly by the Academy of Canadian Cinema and Television at the Genie Awards.

=== List of past recipients ===
- (1981) Micheline Lanctôt For displaying her award-winning talents in both the French and English languages, as an actress, a writer, an animator and (most recently) as a director.
- (1984) Norman McLaren - Academy Award and BAFTA winning short film maker. Winner of 10 Canadian Film Awards (The predecessor to the Genie Awards) In recognition of his long, successful and internationally acclaimed career in the world of animation filmmaking.
- (1985) Paul LeBlanc For his impressive body of work in film and television hairstyling
- (1985) Ivan Reitman For his outstanding success with some of the biggest comedy hits of our generation. The Academy singled out the films Animal House, Meatballs, Stripes and Ghostbusters.
- (1986) Graeme Ferguson For his work with IMAX
- (1987) Emil Radok, Paul Kravicky For the film Taming of the Demons which played primarily at Vancouver's Expo '86
- (1988) Norman Jewison - 7 time Academy Award nominated filmmaker. This award is given to Norman Jewison for founding and establishing the new Canadian Centre for Advanced Film Studies.
- (1989) Presented to The National Film Board of Canada
- (1991) John Kemeny

== See also ==
- Prix Jutra – Canadian French-language counterpart
- Canadian Screen Awards
