= Change of Heart (1993 film) =

1993 Canadian-British family movie

- Theatrical poster
- Directed by: Donald Shebib
- Written by: Terence Heffernan
- Story by: Donald Shebib; Terence Heffernan
- Produced by: Chalmers Adams; Donald Shebib
- Starring: Jeremy Ratchford; Sarah Campbell; Lenore Zann; Barbara Hamilton; Heath Lamberts
- Cinematography: Richard Leiterman
- Edited by: Ron Wisman
- Music by: Milan Kymlička
- Production companies: Clearwater Films; D.E.S.C.A. Productions; Odeon Films
- Distributed by: Cineplex Odeon Films
- Release date: 21 May 1993 (Canada)
- Running time: 96 minutes
- Countries: Canada; United Kingdom
- Language: English

Change of Heart is a 1993 Canadian-British family road movie directed and co-produced by Donald Shebib, based on a story by Shebib and Terence Heffernan. The film stars newcomer Sarah Campbell (ten years old when the film was released) Jeremy Ratchford, and veteran Canadian actors Barbara Hamilton and Heath Lamberts.

== Synopsis ==
Maggie (Sarah Campbell) is a precocious girl of about seven, who, since the recent accidental death of her mother, lives with her bedridden aunt Bea (Barbara Hamilton) in a small town in Ontario. With Bea's health failing and the bills piling up she may lose the house and Maggie may end up in a foster home. Maggie does what she can to help, washing cars among other odd jobs.

When Maggie wins $10,000 in a lottery, her ne'er-do-well grifter uncle Felix (Jeremy Ratchford) tries to con her out of her winnings, making a deal with her to find her unknown father in exchange for paying his $8,000 gambling debt. She agrees and they go on a road trip to Toronto together even though she does not trust him and he does not like children.

During her adventure with Felix, Maggie meets many colourful characters. They find Maggie's father Axel (Heath Lamberts), a very flamboyant gay millionaire whom her mother befriended while singing in lounges. Felix is able to rid himself of his debt and Maggie's home is safe in time for Christmas. By this point, he and Maggie have grown to respect and love one another.

== Cast ==
Main

- Jeremy Ratchford as Felix
- Sarah Campbell as Maggie
- Lenore Zann as Carmen
- Heath Lamberts as Axel
- Barbara Hamilton as Bea

Supporting

- Michael Copeman as Mitch
- Victor Ertmanis as Billy "Billy K"
- Kelly Fiddick as Parker
- Christopher Bondy as Bobby
- Robert Hawkins as Sam
- Gerry Mendicino as Raoul
- Martin Doyle as Paul
- Joseph Griffin as Mr. Saturday Night
- Claire Cellucci as Ms. Saturday Night
- Len Doncheff as Vince
- Jonathan Wilson as Mikey
- Eric Fink as Photographer
- Terry Doyle as Priest
- Shawn Lawrence as Commercial Director
- Felicity Williams as Andrea
- Barbara Franklin as Singer #1
- Arnie Hardt as Singer #2
- Wesley Pantling as Boy
- Carrol Galloway as Nurse

== Production ==
=== Background and writing ===
Change of Heart was Donald Shebib's first film since directing the 1990 made for television film The Little Kidnappers. Screenwriter Terence Heffernan had previously collaborated with Shebib on the TV movie The Canary (1974) and on Shebib's 1981 feature Heartaches. The screenplay, titled Maggie & Felix, was developed from a story by both Heffernan and Shebib. Shebib thought the final script was very funny and called it a "classic redemption story."

=== Casting and filming ===
In a 2013 interview, Shebib remarked that Felix was supposed to be more like the character of Uncle Buck, and that he had hoped to cast John Candy for the part, suggesting the film would have been "a huge success" had that happened: "I think he got [the script] and his agent said, "You're not even allowed to read it," because it didn't come with an offer. That's too bad, because he would have been great in it." Shebib further remarked that Jeremy Ratchford was very young and "not very good" in most of the film but did finally get "really good in the last part". By contrast, he considered Sarah Campbell, a child actor and member of ACTRA since the age of two and ten years old when the film was released, "magnificent".

Like most of his previous films, Change of Heart was shot primarily in Toronto, from 19 January to 29 February 1992.

=== Financing ===
Shebib said that Change of Heart was made "very cheaply." Shebib described raising money for the project as "sheer hell": "I was scrambling around looking for ways of making money. There just wasn't anything." Producer Chalmers Adams, who was also Shebib's lawyer, was responsible for the film finally securing funding.

== Release and reception ==
With little or no advance promotion, Change of Heart premiered theatrically in Toronto on 21 May 1993 and closed after one week. It was also screened in September at the Cinefest Sudbury International Film Festival.

=== Broadcasts, home media, and streaming ===
The film is known to have aired occasionally on Canadian premium channels Moviepix and Bravo! as late as 2000, but was not released for the domestic video market, the only one of Shebib's feature films not to receive such a release; it remains unavailable for streaming. When Chalmers Adams was asked about it by Sam Weisberg in 2013, he responded "very tersely" to "several emails".

=== Critical response ===
==== Contemporary ====
Writing for the Toronto Star, Jamie Kastner described Change of Heart a "charming, warmer twist on the road movie genre", while the Star's critic Rob Salem described the film as "a gentle, heartfelt little family drama, well-cast and nicely acted". The same paper's Susan Kastner said it was a "feel-good" movie "sweetly done", lamenting its lack of exposure in the media and that other critics had found it "too uncool, too undeep, too sweet".

Writing for Maclean's, Joe Chidley panned the film: "Like most family dramas, it tries to warm the heart and tickle the imagination. Instead, Change of Heart is so heavily laden with cheesy sentimentality that it could probably cause coronary failure. For adults, the film ... fails on almost every front. For kids, Change of Heart seems more like an after-school time-filler on TV than a feature movie."

==== Retrospective ====
The Great Canadian Guide to the Movies calls the film an "O.K. family comedy" with "some very clever scenes and ideas," though it is "a bit clunkily put together." The reviewer on the German Cinema website suggests an otherwise nice film is sometimes overly sweet and kitsch.
