= Donald Shebib =

Canadian film director (1938–2023)

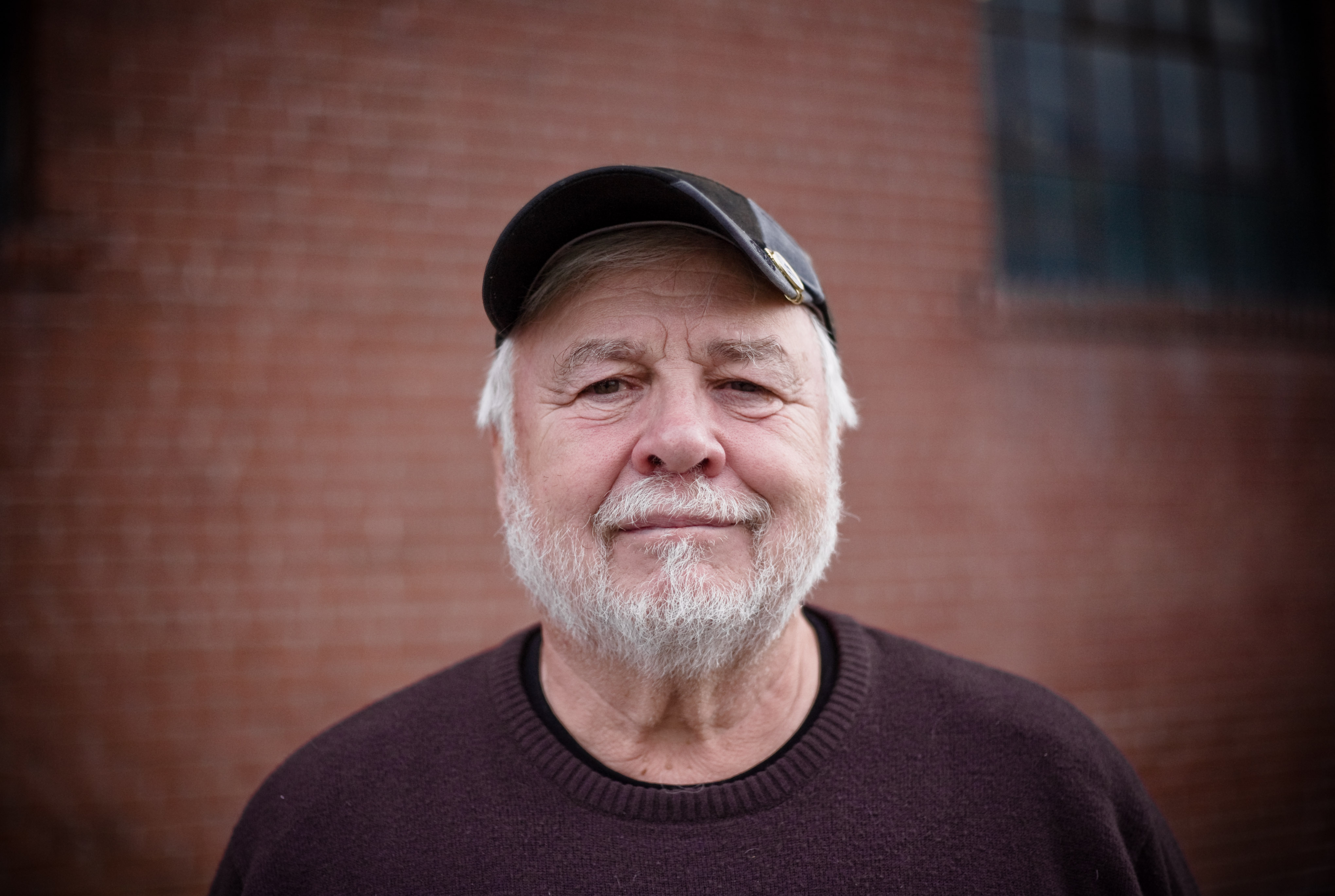
- Born: Donald Everett Shebib; 27 January 1938; Toronto, Ontario, Canada
- Died: 5 November 2023 (aged 85); Toronto, Ontario, Canada
- Education: University of Toronto
- Occupations: Film and television director, screenwriter, editor
- Years active: 1962–2023
- Known for: Canadian feature films, short documentaries, television films
- Notable work: Goin' Down the Road (1970); Between Friends (1973); Second Wind (1976)
- Spouse: Tedde Moore
- Children: 3, including Noah Shebib (Note: Two biological children and one step-child.)

Donald Everett Shebib (27 January 1938 – 5 November 2023) was a Canadian film and television director. Shebib was a central figure in the development of English Canadian cinema who made several short documentaries for the National Film Board of Canada and CBC Television in the 1960s before turning to feature films, beginning with the influential Goin' Down the Road (1970) and what many call his masterpiece, Between Friends (1973). He soon became frustrated by the bureaucratic process of film funding in Canada and chronic problems with distribution as well as a string of box office disappointments. After Heartaches (1981), he made fewer films for theatrical release and worked more in television.

Shebib was Noah "40" Shebib's father.

== Early life ==
Shebib was born in Toronto, Ontario, the son of Mary Alice Long, a Newfoundlander of Irish descent, and Moses "Morris" Shebib, born in Sydney, Nova Scotia, in 1910, himself the son of Lebanese immigrants.

Shebib grew up in an economically precarious household, and in a neighbourhood where he felt he was an outsider, "growing up with a name like Shebib, very working class, being raised a Catholic in Orange Ontario", conceding he "probably took it more sensitively" than he had to, adding that he was always shy in high school: "I didn't know where I fit in. I grew up feeling pretty inferior." In a 2011 interview with Andrea Nemetz in the Halifax Chronicle Herald, Shebib said: "I was aware of migratory experiences – like the Okies in California in the dust bowl. I had a cousin who came to stay with us in Toronto in the late 1950s and he tried to make a go of it and couldn't and went back to the Maritimes."

The young Shebib grew up loving sports, comic books, and Hollywood "chestnuts" or vintage films, the family acquired their first television set in 1952; for a certain time, Shebib refused to watch any film made after 1940.

== Education ==
Shebib played semi-pro football as a young man, and studied sociology and history at the University of Toronto. While very interested in sociological patterns from history, he did not enjoy reading enough to pursue this interest further academically, but was still looking for something to do that would appeal to his "jock and artist impulses".

In 1961, Shebib enrolled in the UCLA School of Theater, Film and Television, where he gained early experience working on Roger Corman productions, notably as a cinematographer and assistant editor on Dementia 13 (1962), his classmate Francis Ford Coppola's first film, and The Terror (1963). He also made his earliest short films. In 1965, he graduated with a Master of Arts, but decided to return home rather than pursue a career in Hollywood.

== Career ==
Over the next five years, Shebib found his way into the Canadian film industry and quickly established himself, reflecting on his decision to return in 1970:

There's more of a chance here... and it's much easier to get started. There isn't really all that much filmmaking to be done in the States. Educational TV has opened up some opportunities for the documentary, but other than that there is nothing at all. Period. Flat. Nothing exists. Nothing at all.

=== Short documentaries ===
Shebib directed, shot, and edited several award-winning, "lucid" documentaries for the National Film Board of Canada, CTV Television Network, and the Canadian Broadcasting Corporation in the 1960s, notably his thesis film, The Duel (1962), Surfin' (1964), Satan's Choice (1965), an inside view of the motorcycle club, and Good Times, Bad Times (1969), before turning to feature filmmaking.

=== Feature films ===
==== Debut ====
Shebib gained prominence and critical acclaim in Canadian cinema for his seminal 1970 feature Goin' Down the Road, which combined narrative storytelling with Canadian documentary tradition influenced by the British. The low-budget film crew travelled around Toronto in a station wagon, supported by funding from the newly formed Canadian Film Development Corporation. The movie was screened in New York and hailed by Pauline Kael and Roger Ebert. Kael wrote that the movie showed up the ostensibly forced sincerity and perceived honesty of the films of John Cassavetes. It has consistently remained near the top of the list of top 10 films made in Canada in three separate surveys of academics, critics, and film programmers, and was designated a "masterwork" by the Audio-Visual Preservation Trust of Canada. In 1998, a DVD copy was struck from the master negative by the Toronto International Film Festival in conjunction with Telefilm Canada. The film was digitally remastered as one of the key films in the Canadian film canon and was honoured with a screening at the Art Gallery of Ontario.

==== Later features and sequel ====
Following the success of Goin' Down the Road, Shebib expressed a preference for making dramatic rather than documentary films going forward, and directed a mix of commercially unsuccessful genre films beginning with the teen comedy Rip-Off (1971) and the critically acclaimed Between Friends (1973), a somber story of a pair of aspiring surfers who plan a mining robbery in Northern Ontario that goes wrong. Shebib was one of four directors, and many critics, who felt the wrong film had won the Best Feature Film at the 25th Canadian Film Awards, which was already under pressure from a boycott of the awards by Quebec filmmakers. In its December 1973 year in review The Globe and Mail singled out the Canadian Film Award jury for a special "Grand Prix for General All-Around Stupidity" for the Awards' choice over four much stronger nominees. Worse still, the ceremony itself was cancelled and all the promotional planning along with it:

In unison, the long promise of the Canadian industry and Don Shebib seemed to be coming to fruition this year: Shebib had made the film which was the confirmation of all his earlier work; there were six strong feature entries in the Canadian Film Awards; the Awards were to be carried on network television; the films were booked to open across the country with full publicity—all firsts. But instead both had their heads bitten off. Today, Don Shebib says he will never again enter a film in the Canadian Film Awards, that he needs a job and would take one in the U.S. in a minute. This is not sour grapes from someone who's inadequate. This is English Canada's best feature filmmaker reacting to the treatment of the best feature film he's ever made.

The awards scheduled for the following year were cancelled and did not return until 1975. Shebib did enter his next film, Second Wind (1976) and won the award for Best Editing. Neither it nor Fish Hawk (1979) were commercial successes. He found success once more with Heartaches (1981), described by Wyndham Wise as a variation of Goin' Down the Road with a pair of working-class women.

Beginning in the 1980s, Shebib worked primarily in television, but occasionally returned to feature films with Running Brave (1983), Change of Heart (1993), The Ascent (1994), and Down the Road Again (2011), a sequel to Goin' down the Road, featuring some of the original cast members as well as a new generation of characters.

In between The Ascent and Down the Road Again, Shebib said there had been little work, though he had written a few scripts. There was some talk of Shebib directing Rob Stefaniuk in a film called Bart Fargo, an homage to La Petomane, in 2004 and 2005, but it is unclear as to whether it was made, completed, and released. In 2008, he was quoted as saying that Canada was a great place to make a first film, but "a hard place to keep things going."

==== Nightalk ====
Shebib's son Noah "40" Shebib is the executive producer of his father's last film, Nightalk, which stars Ashley Bryant and Al Mukadam. The film premiered on September 16, 2022, at the Toronto International Film Festival.

=== Television ===
Shebib earned critical acclaim and a Canadian Film Award for Good Times, Bad Times, made for the CBC in 1969. Another television film, The Fighting Men (1977), was later given a theatrical release.

The director's later television work included By Reason of Insanity (1982), Slim Obsession (1984) both made for the CBC series For the Record and sold to overseas markets, and the television movies The Climb (1986), The Little Kidnappers (1990) and The Pathfinder (1996). In the 21st century, the Gilbert and Sullivan documentary A Song to Sing-O (2007) was well received.

Drama series work included The Edison Twins, Night Heat, Counterstrike and The Zack Files.

== Philosophy and aesthetics ==
In 1970, Shebib said that his personal philosophy was influenced by television and the Canadian media theorist Marshall McLuhan.

Shebib watched Turner Classic Movies "religiously", and after John Ford, his favourite directors were Frank Capra, William Wellman, Howard Hawks, Marcel Carné, David Lean ("especially his early stuff") and F.W. Murnau ("Sunrise is one of my favorite films"):

These films made from 1930 to 1934, the Pre-Code films, are among the best Hollywood films ever made. People always think 1939 was the sort of glory year of American film. Actually I'd say it was 1933. The films made before the code were infinitely superior.

He said he approved of a few contemporary Canadian feature filmmakers, but found CBC film dramas "just dreadful" and "boring", dismissing them as "silly stories of girls growing up in the prairies", while at the same time he found the broadcaster's "tape dramas" were still "wonderful, they still have that expertise".

I don't know too much about Quebec ... Obviously, Denys Arcand and Jutra and Gilles Carle are good filmmakers. In English Canada, I don't know. Whatever happened to Colin Low? ... He was a brilliant filmmaker, and Tom Daly was a very important film person, and Don Owen and myself.

— Donald Shebib on outstanding Canadian filmmakers

In 2011, Shebib told Geoff Pevere he had expanded his range of Hollywood cinematic viewing from watching only films up to 1950 to films made as late as and even later than 1950, but contended that movies mainly "went in the toilet" after 1950 (with some notable exceptions like Stanley Kramer's The Defiant Ones, a "perfect movie" made in 1958). His dislike for the styles (and subjects) employed by contemporary films was matched by his "seething disdain of critics" and a "testy" ambivalence with respect to the quality of his own work (he called himself "lazy and sloppy" in the execution of his work): Pevere's assessment: "Shebib is an old-fashioned traditionalist adrift in a modernist cultural movement, and therefore as much an outsider as anybody he'd make movies about." His feelings of ambivalence extend to a "reluctance to accept being the designated representative of Canadian anything": "I don't like the idea of suddenly being used as a model for Canada or something. Why take me – whatever my feelings are – and blame that on the Canadian people?"

=== Style and technique ===
In 1973, Shebib said that an independent filmmaker must become involved in all aspects of the filmmaking process. Restating this in a 1982 interview, he noted that few filmmakers were capable of directing, writing, and editing the same film, and that, as a Canadian commercial filmmaker, he believed his own taste was more in tune with that of the general public than other "intellectual" filmmakers who were making "pretentious" and "dull" films. Shebib believed in the John Ford style of cinematic storytelling. In 1993, he said that conflict is essential to a film and should be inherent to the basic structure, and should be present in every scene, every change of scene, of a film: "Conflict is one of the basic essences of humanity."

=== Recurring themes and socio-political views ===
The director's own youth as an "outsider" is particularly reflected in the early short films: "every one of Shebib's two dozen films has studied the shades of yet another caste of society's disbarred... who never quite make it to their place in the sun." Geoff Pevere remarked that almost without exception, the documentary shorts dealt with "isolated individuals or groups existing on the periphery of mainstream society", sometimes as a lifestyle choice as in Surfin' and Satan's Choice (1966), but also as "a forced condition dictated by an unfeeling, ungrateful society", referencing Good Times, Bad Times and the later We've Come Along Way Together, "a poignant, compassionate exploration of old age in a world busting its ass to stay young and beautiful."

In the mid-1970s, Peter Harcourt remarked on the frequent moments of silence denoting introspection in Shebib's films, both in the early documentaries and in the feature films, a "feeling of emptiness, of restlessness, often of irrelevance". Shebib places great value on "male comradeship" and "the need of real challenges to give individuals a sense of their dignity". Piers Handling noted that Shebib was so preoccupied with male bonding that women were absent from his work prior to the start of his feature film career, and likewise identified a tension between the desire to transcend boundaries and existential limits. Sam Weisberg asserts that "all of his films share a common interest in, and empathy with, the extraordinary aspirations of ordinary people," whether "goofy teenagers" trying to make it as a rock band (Rip-Off), a "bored businessman" who takes up jogging (Second Wind), or an Italian prisoner of war "itching to climb Mount Kenya" (The Ascent).

Shebib still considered himself a sociologist at heart, and suggested his films had a strong sociological basis, incorporating social commentary, human relationships being a frequent theme. However, he never considered himself an intellectual: he "didn't talk like one"; not that he was anti-intellectual, just "anti-bullshit": politically "liberal" but not laissez-faire or "bleeding heart", and with "socialist leftist leanings", but believing that Marxism is "just another form of bullshit", not that capitalists were "any better".

The wonder of Don Shebib is not that he makes good films but that he makes them here.

— Martin Knelman (1973) in an article for Toronto Life Magazine

== Critical assessment and influence ==
John Hofsess remarked in 1971 that Shebib's documentary style, developed over five years, is "suffused with a wry, ironic humanism", a "superb style for needling the sacred cows of the establishment and the sanctimonious bull of counter-culture groups" a style often maintained even in Shebib's second dramatic feature, Rip-Off. Sandra Gathercole found it impossible to overstate his significance as "one of the few English Canadian filmmakers whose work illustrates what is meant by indigenous, rather than derivative, Canadian films – films with a character, integrity and identity that are the backbone of any hope we have for an autonomous Canadian industry."

As late as 1993, Goin' Down the Road still had "legendary status" and as of the Toronto International Film Festival's most recent poll of greatest Canadian films, is ranked 6th. It had done more than any other work to advance the Canadian film industry at the time of its release. Within a few years, Shebib's body of work had made him a "unique and recognizable film presence" in Canada and beyond, "verging on international stature." Scholar Katherine A. Roberts remarks how, since the release of Shebib's film, "numerous Canadian filmmakers have sought to explore the mobility/masculinity nexus as it relates to landscape and the national narrative."

Sam Weisberg opines that, with the exception of Between Friends (1973), none of Shebib's feature films made after Goin' Down the Road have quite the same resonance.

Despite his artistic vision and technical skills, a perception grew that Shebib was "his own worst publicity agent", complaining regularly that his scripts were weak or else that he had difficulties with actors. By 1993, after having directed eight feature length dramatic films, around thirty documentaries, and "scores of TV dramas and series" over twenty-five years, Shebib was finding it hard to find work, even in television: "People have given me the reputation of being terrible-tempered on the set, of being hard to work with. But I don't know where that comes from, I'm really the softest guy in the world." When Geoff Pevere interviewed him in 2011, then aged 73, he found Shebib "generous, courteous, and thoughtful", but he had certainly not mellowed: "He can't help himself, even if it has cost him dearly in professional terms."

In 2017, Shebib was presented with a Directors Guild of Canada Lifetime Achievement Award.

== Legacy ==
=== Don Shebib Collection ===
In 1999, the TIFF Reference Library in Toronto received "records created by Shebib and his collaborators," consisting of "script drafts and occasional production records" ranging in production date from "circa 1969 to 1994."

== Personal life ==
=== Pastimes ===
Shebib surfed while he lived in Los Angeles, and continued to play football until 1981 when he had to stop due to shoulder injuries, nevertheless remaining active: he played golf and rock climbed, still able to train enough in 1993 to make the mountain climbing film, The Ascent, for which he climbed up to 15,000 feet.

In 2011, Shebib said of his hobbies and sporting life that he was "a very serious, obsessive person. If it isn't golf it's football or it's stamp collecting. And I was a serious airplane model maker."

=== Marriage and children ===
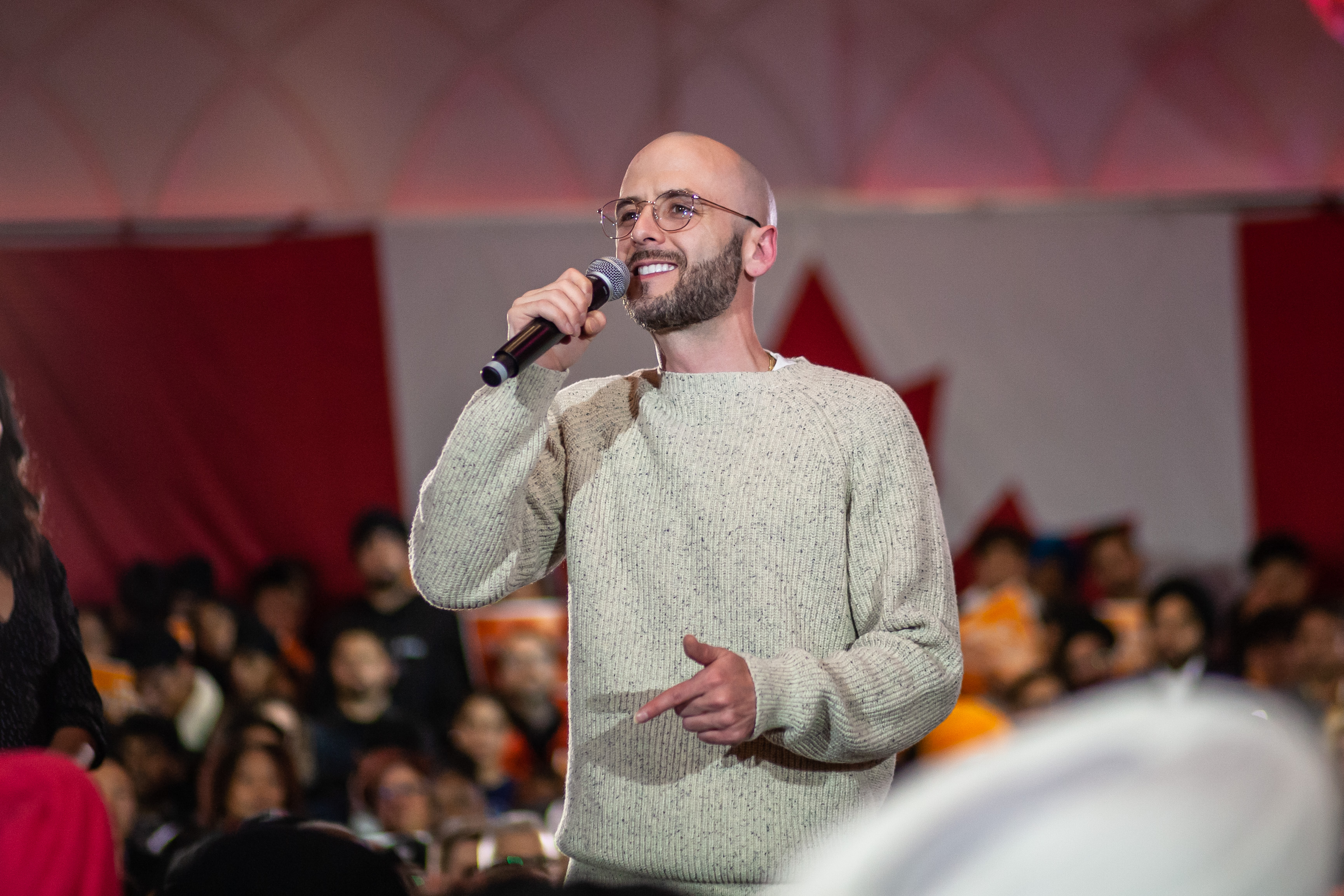
Noah Shebib, better known as 40, in 2019

Shebib married Canadian actress Tedde Moore, whom he met through a mutual friend. Tedde Moore is known for her role as Miss Shields in A Christmas Story and she was pregnant with their son Noah during filming. They no longer lived together, though Moore called him her "life partner."

Their two children Noah and Suzanna are both involved in the performing arts: Suzanna began her career an actress, while Noah, better known as OVO Sound's "40", is an actor and music producer (the siblings have an older half-sister, Zoe). Suzanna is now a chemistry teacher at Toronto's Central Technical School.

=== Friendships and connections ===
Shebib met his lifelong friend Carroll Ballard, with whom he often collaborated, while attending classes at UCLA. In a 1982 interview, he said that Ballard was one of the few contemporary filmmakers he admired.

Shebib attended classes at UCLA with Francis Ford Coppola and worked with him on Dementia 13. He also "hung out" with Jim Morrison during this period, and one summer Beach Boys guitarist Al Jardine stayed with him and his roommates, sharing a love of Gilbert and Sullivan musical numbers.

On his return to Toronto, Shebib met and befriended writer and editor William Fruet when he began working for the CBC on The Way It Is. He was close friends with and dated dancer and columnist Zella Wolofsky who provided guidance on the beginning and ending of Nightalk. She and his son Noah shared Don's primary caregiving during his final weeks alive.

=== Death ===
Donald Shebib died on 5 November 2023, at the age of 85.

== Selected accolades ==
- Canadian Film Awards
  - Best Feature Length Documentary, Good Times, Bad Times (1969)
  - Best Feature Film, Goin' Down the Road (1970)
  - Best Editing, Second Wind (1976)
- Columbus International Film Festival
  - Chris Bronze Plaque, Slim Obsession (1984)
- Directors Guild of Canada
  - Lifetime Achievement Award (2017)

== Filmography ==
=== Films ===
==== Early short films and documentaries ====
• Student films (UCLA)

- 1961 The Train (13 min., 16mm)
- 1962 Joey (10 min., 16mm)
  - The Duel (27 min., 16mm) (thesis)
- 1963 Revival (10 min., 16mm)
  - Reparations (unfinished, 16mm)
- 1964 Surfin' (25 min., 16mm)
  - Eddie (40 min., 16mm)
  - Autumnpan (60 min., 16mm)

• National Film Board

- 1965 Satan's Choice (28 min., 16mm)
- 1966 A Search for Learning (13 min., 16mm)

==== Feature films ====
- 1970 — Goin' Down the Road (87 min., 16mm; also writer)
- 1971 — Rip-Off (89 min.; co-editor)
- 1973 — Between Friends (91 min.; co-editor)
- 1976 — Second Wind (93 min.; also editor)
- 1979 — Fish Hawk (97 min.)
- 1981 — Heartaches (105 min.; video release 90 min.)
- 1983 — Running Brave (106 min.; as "D.S. Everett")
- 1993 — Change of Heart (96 min.)
- 1994 — The Ascent (96 min.)
- 2011 — Down the Road Again (84 min.)
- 2022 — Nightalk

=== Television ===
==== Films ====
• Documentaries

- 1966 Allan (CBC, 22 min., 16mm)
- 1966-67 CTV, This Land Is People
  - 1966 David Secter (14 min., 16mm); June Marks (15 min., 16mm); Christalot Hanson (15 min., 16mm)
  - 1967 Everdale Place (22 min., 16mm)
- 1967 CBC, TBA: Basketball (24 min., 16mm)
- 1967-69 CBC,The Way It Is
  - 1967 Satan's Choice (short version, 8 min., 16mm); Haight-Ashbury;
  - 1968 San Francisco Summer 1967 (59 min., 16mm); Unknown Soldier (7 min., 16mm); Stanfield (20 min., 16mm); Graduation Day (7 min., 16mm)
  - 1969 Good Times, Bad Times (40 min.;; rebroadcast 1974: Such Is Life)
- 1972 CBC, Telescope: Born Hustler (25 min., 16mm)
- 1974 CBC, Gallery: Winning is the Only Thing! (24 min., 16mm)
  - CBC, Of All People: Mrs. Gray (22 min., 16mm)
  - CTV, We've Come a Long Way Together (29 min., 16mm)
- 1990 CBS, Top Cops: Larry Mullane/John Benedict
- 2007 Bravo!: A Song to Sing-O

• Dramas and docudramas

- 1975 The Canary (48 min., 16mm; CBC, Performance)
- 1977 Old Man Reever (40 min., 16mm; CBC, This Monday)
  - The Fighting Men (75 min., 16mm; CBC, Saturday Night Movies; 1988 theatrical release: Men of Steel, 91 min., 35mm)
- 1982 By Reason of Insanity (60 min., 16mm; CBC, For the Record)
- 1984 Slim Obsession (60 min., 16mm; CBC, For the Record)
- 1986 The Climb (90 min.; BBC/CTV, Mountain Men; edited version in Summits of Glory anthology)
  - The Little Kidnappers (CBC/Disney)
- 1996 The Pathfinder (Hallmark)
- 1997 Highwayman (Showtime, Dead Man's Gun)

==== Dramatic series episodes ====
Shebib directed at least one episode of the following series.

- 1974 The Collaborators (CBC): "Deedee", "Once Upon a Time in Genarro"
- 1978 Sidestreet (CBC): "Holiday for Homicide"
- 1985–1986 The Edison Twins (CBC): 4 episodes
- 1987 Danger Bay (CBC): "All the King's Horses", "S.S. Friendship"
  - Diamonds
  - Night Heat: "Bad Timing" "Vantage Point", "The Mercenary"
  - Sea Hunt: 5 episodes
  - T. and T.
- 1987–1988: Katts and Dog
- 1988–1990: The Campbells: "Ancient Wounds", "The Miller's Son", "The Reluctant Candidate", "Fortunes of War", "The Sky Is the Limit"
  - My Secret Identity: "The Lost Weekend", "Look Before You Leap", "When the Sun Goes Down", "White Lies", "Seems Like Only Yesterday"
- 1990–1992 E.N.G.: "All Things Betray Thee", "Lest You Be Judged", "Harvest"
- 1991 Street Justice (CBC): "Shadows"
  - 1990–1993: Counterstrike: "Verathion", "Masks", "Clearcut"
- 1994–1995 Lonesome Dove: The Series: "Law and Order", "Blood Money", "Rebellion"
- 1997–1999 Wind at My Back: "Triple Trouble", "New Directions", "Grace of Hollywood"
- 1998 Police Academy: The Series: "Mr. I.Q.", "The Truth Ain't What It Used to Be", "Luke...Warm"
- 1998 The New Addams Family: "Cousin Itt Visits the Addams Family", "Thing Is Missing"
- 2000 Code Name: Eternity: "Dark of Night"
- 2001–2002 Caitlin's Way: "Duh Truth, Uh-Huh"
- 2000–2002 The Zack Files: "Captain Sonic", "Things to Do at Horace Hyde White When You're Dead", "Zack Greenburg's Day Off"
- 2003 Radio Free Roscoe
