= For the Record (Canadian TV series) =

Canadian television series

- Genre: Drama anthology
- Country of origin: Canada
- Original language: English
- No. of episodes: 51

Production
- Executive producers: Ralph Thomas; Stephen Patrick; Sam Levene; Sig Gerber
- Production company: CBC Television

Original release
- Release: 8 February 1976 – 1985

For the Record is a Canadian television drama anthology series that aired on CBC Television from 1976 to 1985. The series aired docudrama-style television films on contemporary social issues, typically airing between four and six films per year.

After a nearly decade run, the series was cancelled in 1985, although the CBC opted to continue commissioning similar television films as standalone productions, beginning with 1986's Turning to Stone.

== Concept ==
For the Record was intended as a series of dramas which would take an honest look at problems in Canadian society, among them many about mental illness and "flawed social institutions". It evolved out of the anthology series Performance, with some of its early films having been originally announced as entering production for that series before ultimately airing as episodes of For the Record instead.

== Critical assessment ==
Gail Henley remarked in 1985 that For the Record dramas were "information laden" when compared to their more emotional American counterparts and emphasises the importance of research and documentation for the series. As Bill MacVicar put it:

Topicality is both a blessing and a bane for television. Since the time from concept to telecast can be much shorter than for movies, television appears better briefed and more up-to-date. But the voraciousness of the medium encourages clumsy or cynical abuse of topicality; all too often (as in the slack Lou Grant the mere act of raising an issue is assumed to be tantamount to solving it; in other cases, solutions are so slickly simplified that what purports to be an investigation is little more than a case of special pleading. In contrast to this frequent shortcoming, the CBC's For the Record series tends to do justice to the problems it airs.

== Episodes ==
=== 1976 ===
Number	Title	Director	Writer	Cast	Date
1	"The Insurance Man from Ingersoll"	Peter Pearson	Peter Pearson, Norman Hartley	Michael Magee, Charlotte Blunt, Warren Davis, Mavor Moore	8 February 1976
An opposition MPP in the Legislative Assembly of Ontario makes explosive charges of political corruption against the government.
2	"A Nest of Shadows"	Peter Carter	Michael Mercer	Louise Rinfret, Ralph Endersby	15 February 1976
3	"A Thousand Moons"	Gilles Carle	Mort Forer	Carole Laure, Nick Mancuso, Adeline Coppaway	29 February 1976
An elderly Métis woman living in Toronto wants to return to her hometown before her death.
4	"Kathy Karuks Is a Grizzly Bear"	Peter Pearson	Ralph L. Thomas	Lesley Angus, Red Burnett, Rudi Lipp, Donnelly Rhodes, Dixie Seatle	7 March 1976
A swimmer who aspires to perform a marathon swim across Lake Ontario copes with an unscrupulous coach.
5	"What We Have Here Is a People Problem"	Francis Mankiewicz	Michael Mercer	George Waight, Heath Lamberts, Sandy Webster	1976

=== 1977 ===
Number	Title	Director	Writer	Cast	Date
6	"Maria"	Allan King	Rick Salutin	Diane D'Aquila, Enzina Bertini, Jean Gascon	9 January 1977
A woman organizes a labour union.
7	"Someday Soon..."	Don Haldane	Rudy Wiebe, Barry Pearson	John Vernon	16 January 1977
Farmers in Manitoba try to resist a hydroelectric dam development that threatens to flood their land.
8	"Dreamspeaker"	Claude Jutra	Anne Cameron	Ian Tracey, George Clutesi	23 January 1977
Adaptated into Anne Cameron's novel Dreamspeaker.
9	"Hank"	Don Haldane	Don Bailey, Ralph L. Thomas	Bob Warner	30 January 1977
10	"Ada"	Claude Jutra	Claude Jutra, Margaret Gibson	Janet Amos, Jayne Eastwood, David Fox	6 February 1977
Several women struggle in the mental health system.
11	"The Tar Sands"	Peter Pearson	Peter Pearson, Peter Rowe, Ralph L. Thomas	Kenneth Welsh, Ken Pogue	12 September 1977

=== 1978 ===
Number	Title	Director	Writer	Cast	Date
12	"A Matter of Choice"	Francis Mankiewicz	Anne Cameron	Michael Ironside, Roberta Maxwell, Fiona Reid, Gary Reineke	29 January 1978
After being sexually assaulted by her acquaintance David (Reineke), Carol (Maxwell) struggles with the moral and legal complexities of whether to report her assault to the police.
13	"Scoop"	Anthony Perris	Douglas Bowie	Scott Hylands, Lloyd Bochner, Deborah Templeton, Sabina Maydelle	12 February 1978
14	"Dying Hard"	Don Haldane	Bill Gough	Neil Munro, Clyde Rose, Claude Bede, Austin Davis, Estelle Wall	12 March 1978
15	"Seer Was Here"	Claude Jutra	Claude Jutra, Don Bailey	David Hemblen, Robert Forsythe	3 December 1978

=== 1979 ===
Number	Title	Director	Writer	Cast	Date
16	"Cementhead"	Ralph L. Thomas	Ralph L. Thomas, Roy MacGregor	Tom Butler, Peter Dvorsky, Martin Short, Kate Lynch, Geraint Wyn Davies	18 February 1979
Bear Bernier, a minor league hockey player from Sudbury, is willing to do whatever it takes to make the National Hockey League.
17	"Je me souviens / Don't Forget Me"	Robin Spry	Carmel Dumas		25 February 1979
18	"Homecoming"	Gilles Carle	Anne Cameron		4 March 1979
19	"Certain Practices"	Martin Lavut	Ian Sutherland	Richard Monette, Alan Scarfe	11 March 1979
A young doctor challenges his hospital's chief surgeon over experimental surgeries. Winner of the Genie Award for Outstanding TV Drama Over 30 Minutes at the 1st Genie Awards in 1980.
20	"Every Person Is Guilty"	Paul Almond	Ralph L. Thomas, Roy MacGregor	Ken Pogue, Lynne Griffin	1979
A journalist (Ken Pogue) tries to investigate a physical attack on his daughter.
21	"One of Our Own"	William Fruet	Florrie Adelson		3 October 1979

=== 1980 ===
Number	Title	Director	Writer	Cast	Date
22	"The Winnings of Frankie Walls"	Martin Lavut	Rob Forsyth	Al Waxman, Chapelle Jaffe	2 March 1980
Blue collar worker Frankie Walls (Waxman) struggles to find a new job after being laid off.
23	"Harvest"	Giles Walker	Rob Forsyth	Jan Rubeš	9 March 1980
24	"Maintain the Right"	Les Rose	Tony Sheer	Laurie Brown, Nicholas Campbell	16 March 1980
After political activist Jane Kohl's (Brown) apartment is robbed, RCMP officer Tom Kelby (Campbell) is forced to decide whether to stand with her in the face of evidence that his superiors may be engaging in surveillance of Jane.
25	"A Question of the Sixth"	Graham Parker	Grahame Woods	Lawrence Dane, Maureen McRae	23 March 1980
Garnet Burton (Dane), a middle-aged hog breeder, fights to be allowed to die by assisted suicide after being diagnosed with terminal cancer.
26	"Lyon's Den"	Graham Parker	Tony Sheer	Mary Bellows, James Blendick, Mogens Gander	1980

=== 1981 ===
Number	Title	Director	Writer	Cast	Date
27	"A Far Cry from Home"	Gordon Pinsent	Helen Weils, Bill Gough	Mary Ann McDonald, Richard Monette	1 February 1981
28	"Snowbird"	Peter Pearson	Margaret Atwood	Robert Christie, Jayne Eastwood, Doris Petrie	8 February 1981
Willa (Doris Petrie), an older widow, resists her daughter's desire that she move into a nursing home by moving out of her family home and going out on the road to travel.
29	"The Running Man"	Donald Brittain	Anna Sandor	Chuck Shamata, Barbara Gordon, Colm Feore, Kate Trotter	22 February 1981
A married man struggles to come to terms with his homosexuality.
30	"Cop"	Al Waxman	Grahame Woods		8 March 1981
31	"Final Edition"	Peter Rowe	Tony Sheer	Alan Scarfe, Neil Munro, Donald Davis, Robert Clothier, Michael Hogan	22 March 1981
A media company decides to shut down its long-running flagship newspaper.

=== 1982 ===
Number	Title	Director	Writer	Cast	Date
32	"An Honourable Member"	Donald Brittain	Roy MacGregor	Fiona Reid, Don Francks, Eric House	28 February 1982
Trish Baldwin, a backbench Member of Parliament, is named to the Cabinet of Canada but struggles to balance her political ambitions with her personal integrity when she has to defend a major government project in her riding to which she is personally opposed.
33	"By Reason of Insanity"	Donald Shebib	David McLaren	Patricia Collins, John Wildman, Hrant Alianak	7 March 1982
Psychiatrists try to evaluate whether or not an accused murderer is insane.
34	"High Card"	Bill Gough	Anna Sandor	Chuck Shamata, Celine Lomez, Helen Hughes	14 March 1982
A photographer gets himself into financial trouble by overusing his credit cards.
35	"Becoming Laura"	Martin Lavut	Gordon Knot	Jennifer Jewison, Tom McCamus, Shelley Thompson	21 March 1982
A troubled teenager tries to establish her identity.
36	"Blind Faith"	John Trent, Jack Nixon-Browne	Ian Sutherland	Sneezy Waters, Florence Paterson, Peter MacNeill, Martha Burns	28 March 1982
Marge Aylesworth (Paterson) inherits her late husband's horse racing business.

=== 1983 ===
Number	Title	Director	Writer	Cast	Date
37	"Ready for Slaughter"	Allan King	Roy MacGregor	Gordon Pinsent, Diana Belshaw, Layne Coleman, Booth Savage	6 March 1983
A farmer struggles to hold onto his business despite his increasing financial debt.
38	"Out of Sight, Out of Mind"	Zale Dalen		Nicholas Campbell, Robert Joy, John Wildman	13 March 1983
39	"Reasonable Force"	Peter Rowe	Brian Kit McLeod, Peter Lower	Deepa Mehta, Abdul Merali, Lee Taylor	20 March 1983
An Indo-Canadian family in Vancouver struggles to deal with racism.
40	"Moving Targets"	John Trent	Ian Sutherland	Allan Royal	27 March 1983

=== 1984 ===
Number	Title	Director	Writer	Cast	Date
41	"Kate Morris, Vice President"	Danièle J. Suissa	John C. W. Saxton	Kate Trotter, Scott Hylands	19 February 1984
A woman struggles to be taken seriously in her business career.
42	"I Love a Man in Uniform"	Don McBrearty	John Frizzell	Tom Butler, Denis Forest, Dan MacDonald, Stephanie Morgenstern, Dixie Seatle, Timothy Webber, Kenneth Welsh	26 February 1984
43	"Hide & Seek"	René Bonnière	Barry Wexler	Bob Martin, Ingrid Veninger, David Patrick, Alan Scarfe	4 March 1984
Adaptation of Thomas J. Ryan's 1977 science fiction novel The Adolescence of P-1.
44	"Slim Obsession"	Donald Shebib	Janet Kranz, Martin Langer	Susan Wright, Paul Kelman	11 March 1984
45	"Rough Justice"	Peter Yalden-Thomson			25 March 1984
46	"A Change of Heart"	Anne Wheeler		Joy Coghill, Ken James	1 April 1984

=== 1985 ===
Number	Title	Director	Writer	Cast	Date
47	"The Boy Next Door"	John Hunter	John Hunter	Chris Owens, Chapelle Jaffe, Michael Hogan	10 February 1985
A mother struggles to cope with the behaviour of her troubled teenage son.
48	"Where the Heart Is"	Carol Moore Ede	Suzette Couture	Margo Kane, Gary Farmer, Tantoo Cardinal, Tom Jackson	23 February 1985
After divorcing from her white husband, an indigenous woman discovers that she has lost her First Nations status.
49	"The Front Line"	Douglas Jackson	Ken Mitchell	Brent Carver, Monique Mercure	3 March 1985
An activist priest encourages his congregation to protest a local factory which is manufacturing parts for military equipment.
50	"Tools of the Devil"	Peter Yalden-Thomson	Don Truckey	Marc Strange, Heath Lamberts	10 March 1985
A journalist (Strange) tries to investigate the secret agenda of a politician (Lamberts).
51	"The Exile"	Gordon Pinsent	Michael Mercer, Peter Lower	Denis Akiyama, Robert Ito, Hiroshi Nakashimi, Jim McLarty	15 September 1985
Three generations of a Japanese Canadian family deal with the ongoing consequences of the Japanese Canadian internment in World War II.
