= George Bloomfield =

George Bloomfield may refer to:

- George Bloomfield (cricketer) (1882–1958), Australian cricketer
- George Bloomfield (director) (1930–2011), Canadian film, television and stage director
