= The Fighting Men =

The Fighting Men may refer to:

- Fighting Men (1942), a series of U.S. short educational films for soldiers
- The Fighting Men (1950 film), an Italian melodrama film
- The Fighting Men (1977 film), a Canadian survival television film
