= Slim Obsession =

- Genre: Drama
- Screenplay by: Janet Kranz, Martin Langer
- Directed by: Donald Shebib
- Starring: Susan Wright, Paul Kelman, Lindsay Connell, Michael J. Reynolds; C. Kerry Keane, Lynda Mason Green, Sharon Dyer
- Music by: Glenn Morley; Lawrence Shragge
- Country of origin: Canada
- Original language: English

Production
- Executive producer: Sig Gerber
- Producer: Bonita Siegel
- Cinematography: Vic Sarin
- Editor: Myrtle Virgo
- Running time: 60 minutes
- Production company: CBC

Original release
- Network: CBC Television
- Release: March 11, 1984

Slim Obsession is a 1984 Canadian short drama television film directed by Donald Shebib and produced by Bonita Siegel and Sig Gerber, about a small-town school teacher (Susan Wright), who, after moving to Toronto, begins to diet and exercise to excess, almost destroying her marriage and her own physical and mental health. The film was made for the anthology series For the Record and garnered an award at the Columbus International Film Festival. Wright won an ACTRA for her performance in 1985.

== Synopsis ==
Liz (Susan Wright) is a small town school teacher who, after moving to Toronto, begins to feel she must lose weight in order to be accepted by a society that judges women by their figures. She becomes obsessed with dieting and exercise to the detriment of her physical health and emotional well-being.

== Themes ==
Richard Collins describes Slim Obsession as the depiction of the experience and consequences of a "general social problem", namely the "attempt to conform to the prescribed norm of female beauty", a goal which is not only self-defeating but self-destructive. Collins relates this theme to a more general or universal theme of control, "the general human project of achieving command over the world" and notes that the film "displays a number of Shebib's authorial markings" in that his films are often about loners.

== Production ==
=== Background ===
Sig Gerber took over as executive producer of For the Record in 1983, in its eighth season. Like his predecessors, he emphasised the role of the series as an honest look at problems in Canadian society. Gail Henley remarked in 1985 that For the Record dramas were "information laden" when compared to their more emotional American counterparts and emphasises the importance of research and documentation for the series.

Slim Obsession was one of twelve dramas made about women by the series, and the second made by Donald Shebib, after By Reason of Insanity (1982).

=== Filming ===
Slim Obsession was filmed in Toronto, which is also, as Richard Collins notes, "unmistakably" the story's setting, as neither flags nor license plates were obscured. Principal photography was scheduled for 20 April through 6 May 1983.

== Release and reception ==
Slim Obsession was first broadcast on 11 March 1984 and was shown the same year at the Columbus International Film Festival.

=== Distribution ===
The film was sold to overseas markets in Germany, Bermuda, Bahamas, Trinidad, Norway, Finland, and Yugoslavia.

=== Critical response ===
Richard Collins calls Slim Obsession a "finely produced, modest drama" that transcends "both naturalistic concentration on an individual history and abstract sociological discourse about a big social problem." Shebib's film perfectly exemplifies the Chabrolian "little subject" where an extensive representation is created out of a relatively modest subject.

=== Accolades ===
- Columbus International Film Festival, Chris Bronze Plaque, 1984
- ACTRA Award, Best Actress (Susan Wright), 1985
