= Zella Wolofsky =

Canadian modern dancer and HCI researcher

- Born: 1947 (age 78–79); Canada
- Education: McGill University, Simon Fraser University, University of Toronto
- Known for: Modern dance, dance research, human-computer interaction research, teaching
- Spouse: Douglas Tyndall Wright (died 2020)

Zella Wolofsky (born 1947) is a Canadian modern dancer, researcher, columnist, and educator. During her dance career, she danced with various dance companies including Dancemakers, Winnipeg's Contemporary Dancers, Burnaby Dance, Laura Dean, and independent choreographers such as Jean Pierre Perrault, Muna Tseng, Elizabeth Chitty as part of 15 Dance Labs, founded by Miriam Adams and Lawrence Adams in Toronto, Canada.

Her research became the launchpad for applying computer interpretation to Labanotation at Simon Fraser University, which led to the development of LifeForms, the computer program used by Merce Cunningham in the later part of his career. Journalist Robert Sarti described her research as a way for choreographers to eventually be able to try out new movements, similar to how a composer might "doodle" on a piano.

== Biography ==
Zella Wolofsky was born in 1947 in Canada. She was known for her reconstruction and performances of Doris Humphrey 1931 iconic masterpiece solo, Two Ecstatic Themes, and was the first to perform this solo widely in Canada. Clement Crisp, the dance critic at The Financial Times praised her performance of this solo when he saw it at The Place, in London UK. She studied modern dance with Merce Cunningham, Viola Farber, Peggy Baker, Ruth Currier, Milton Myers, Bella Lewitzky and ballet with Alfredo Corvino and Maggie Black.

She received a 1967 B.Sc. degree from McGill University, a 1974 M.Sc. degree from Simon Fraser University, and after she retired from performing, a Doctorate in Education from University of Toronto in 1990. Her graduate studies were supported by Canada Council Humanities Grant, National Research Council Canada Award, and Social Sciences and Humanities Research Council Doctoral Fellowship. LifeForm software was the brainchild of Wolofsky and Tom Calvert, and later, Thecla Schiphorst. Wolofsky was the first person who applied Labanotation, a system of human movements, to computers, which was part of her masters thesis. She had been interested in the creation of computer animation of dancers and their movement.

Wolofsky was on the Board of Directors of Dancer Transition Resource Centre and Peggy Baker Dance Projects and served as Board Secretary for both organizations. While in Vancouver in the 1970s, she wrote for Dance Magazine as Foreign Correspondent from Vancouver. She taught modern dance part time during her dance career at University of Waterloo, Simon Fraser University, York University, and George Brown College

== Personal life ==
She was married to Douglas Tyndall Wright, President of University of Waterloo and its first Dean of Engineering. They had met when she taught at University of Waterloo in the late 1970s, but only started dating in 1987 after she began her doctoral studies. He died in May 2020. She was close friends with and dated the Canadian filmmaker Donald Shebib, whose legendary 1970 feature Goin' Down the Road, was seminal to English language Canadian film. Wolofsky provided guidance on the beginning and ending of his last film, Nightalk. She and his son Noah (AKA 40) shared Don's primary caregiving during his last weeks.
