= Barbara Hamilton (actress) =

Canadian actress (1926–1996)

- Hamilton in 1970
- Born: 11 December 1926; Toronto, Ontario, Canada
- Died: 7 February 1996 (aged 69); Toronto, Ontario, Canada
- Resting place: Mount Pleasant Cemetery, Toronto
- Education: University of Toronto
- Occupation: Actress
- Years active: 1940s–1996

Barbara Hamilton (11 December 1926 – 7 February 1996) was a Canadian actress. She was known for her comedic roles and was dubbed 'The Funniest Woman in Canada.' Outside of Canada, her live theatre career took her to London, New York and Bermuda. Hamilton is known for roles in films and television series such as Road to Avonlea. Her theatre performances have included the Spring Thaw revue. She is also known for originating the role of Marilla Cuthbert in both the Canadian and West End productions of Anne of Green Gables.

== Early life ==
Hamilton was born in Toronto, Ontario on 11 December 1926 and educated in Cobourg, Ontario. She was the youngest of three children. The others, Mary and Bob both died of cancer. After studies at Brockville Collegiate Institute, she attended the University of Toronto where her early performances were featured at the Hart House Theatre.

== Career ==
Hamilton's first professional role was in Kesselring's Arsenic and Old Lace at Toronto's Royal Alexandra Theatre (Royal Alex) in 1943. This was the first of 14 appearances at the Royal Alex, the most of any actor.

She played in the Razzle Dazzle revue on Broadway. According to Hamilton, that folded so quickly, she had to take a job in the luggage department at Selfridge's. "I was the only girl in the place, but I did all of the muscle work, lifting trunks and suitcases. None of the men were as big as me."

Hamilton returned to Canada and toured for several seasons with the Canadian Players troupe and acted for three seasons in Bermuda. She then joined the cast of Spring Thaw which established her comedic credentials. She developed her own revue That Hamilton Woman at Toronto's Crest Theatre as well as appearing in numerous dramatic productions at the Crest. According to Hamilton herself "I don't pretend to be a classical actress, but I have a tough time convincing people that I am not just a clown."

In 1965, Hamilton originated the role of Marilla at the Charlottetown Festival production of Anne of Green Gables. She repeated the role in a London, England production and was awarded the best actress award by the London drama critics. She portrayed Marilla for five seasons at the Festival, at Expo '70, and at the Royal Alex.

In 1985, she appeared in No Sex Please, We're British and in 1987 in Pride and Prejudice as Lady Catherine de Bourgh.

While known for theatre, Hamilton also appeared in television and film and did animation voice work. She was disappointed that Colleen Dewhurst was cast as Marilla in the live action Anne of Green Gables by Sullivan Productions, but did appear in its Road to Avonlea TV series. Hamilton has appeared as Marilla in two British TV series based on the Lucy Maud Montgomery books. Hamilton played Mavis in the CBC-TV drama series "Mavis" in the 1960s. Her final film role was in Norman Jewison's Bogus, released after her death.

== Personal life and death ==
Hamilton's long-time companion was Wayne Lonergan from 1972 until his death in 1986. They had no children. Hamilton died as a result of breast cancer in 1996 at the age of 69. That year, the Toronto Alliance for the Performing Arts established the Barbara Hamilton Award to honour those who demonstrate excellence in the performing arts.

== Filmography ==
=== Film ===
Year	Title	Role	Notes
1948	A Song Is Born	Woman at Dorsey Club (uncredited)	
1950	The Lady Craved Excitement	Chorus Girl	
1950	Come Dance with Me	Kiki – Stage Girl	
1994	Car 54, Where Are You?	Mrs. Muldoon	
1996	Bogus	Mrs. Partridge	Posthumous release

=== Television ===
Year	Title	Role	Notes
1952	Sunshine Sketches	Poet's Wife	
1952	Stopwatch and Listen		
1954–1959	Howdy Doody (Canadian version)	Willow The Witch	
1956	Is It a Woman's World?		
1956	Anne of Green Gables	Shop Assistant	TV movie
1957	On Camera	Mother	Episode: "Black Cats Are Good Cats"
1959	A Dangerous Age		
1960	Encounter		Episode: "How to Make More Money Than Men"
1960	Just Mary		
1961	One Plus One		Segment: "Baby"
1961	Razzle Dazzle	Mother Mayonnaise	
1964	The Forest Rangers	Mrs. Aggie Apple	4 episodes
1970–1971	The Trouble With Tracy	Maid	
1972	The Year of the Yahoo!	Barbara	
1972	Anne of Green Gables	Marilla Cuthbert	Miniseries
1973	Delilah	Aunt Peggy	
1974	And That's the News, Goodnight	Various	
1974	The Naked Mind		
1975	Anne of Avonlea	Marilla Cuthbert	6 episodes
1978	Mathmakers		
1979	Lost and Found	Mrs. Bryce	
1980	Archie Bunker's Place	Woman #2	Episode: "The Wildcat Strike"
1981	B.C.: A Special Christmas	Fat Broad (voice)	TV movie
1981	Sanford	Old Woman Juror	Episode: "Jury Duty"
1983	Gimme a Break!	Lady Customer	Episode: "Nell and the Kid"
1984	Today's Special	Dr. Bennett	Episode: "Hospitals"
1985	Today's Special	Dr. Bennett	Episode: "Muffy"
1985	Check It Out	Mrs. Cobb	
1985	Night Heat	Irma Deutch	Episode: "Secrets"
1986	Seeing Things	Mrs. Coitart	Episode: "Snow Blind"; Episode: "That Hang Dog Look"
1987	Diamonds		Episode: "Here Comes the Bride"
1988	Diamonds		Episode: "Where There's a Will"
1988	Sharon, Lois & Bram's Elephant Show	The Curio Shoppe Owner	Episode: "Curio Shoppe"
1988	Hot Paint		TV movie
1988	C.O.P.S.	Additional Voices	Episode: "The Case of the Stuck-Up Blimp"
1989	Glory! Glory!	Selma	TV movie
1989	Babar	Additional Voices	13 episodes
1989	Street Legal	Dr. Bernstein	Episode: "Confession"
1990	Clarence	Mrs. Duckworth	TV movie
1990–1991	E.N.G.	Christy Callwood	4 episodes
1991	Rin Tin Tin: K-9 Cop	Mrs. Baker	Episode: "Abused Child"
1991–1995	Shining Time Station	Ginny Johnson	15 episodes
1992	Change of Heart	Aunt Bea	
1992–1996	Road to Avonlea	Eulalie Bugle	23 episodes
1994	The Mighty Jungle	Rose Hufnagel	Episode: "Hairy Proposal"

== Awards and recognition ==
- Earle Grey Award (1993)
