= Stopwatch and Listen =

- Genre: Comedy
- Starring: Sam Aaron; Barbara Hamilton; Alfie Scopp
- Country of origin: Canada
- Original language: English
- No. of seasons: 1
- No. of episodes: 5

Production
- Producer: Ross McLean
- Running time: 30 minutes

Original release
- Network: CBC Television
- Release: 12 September – 10 October 1952

Stopwatch and Listen is a Canadian comedy television series that aired on CBC Television in 1952.

== Premise ==
This mockumentary series was based on a 1951 programme on CBC Radio's Trans-Canada Network. All aspects of the production were managed by producer Ross McLean. He chose a theme such as feature films or telephones six weeks prior to airdate then conducted rehearsals on the resulting scripts four weeks later. This culminated in a live broadcast of that episode.

Stopwatch and Listen was one of CBC's very first regular TV series, debuting the week the TV network went on the air. It was not a success, with Peter Gzowski opining "it may well have been the most catastrophic flop in CBC history and which left the air in a flurry of bad taste." (The final broadcast, which like all episodes in this series was broadcast live, apparently included some ad-libs that were considered to be off-colour by 1952 standards.) A contemporary review by Alex Barris after the first broadcast noted that the show suffered from "poor timing - on the part of the producer", but praised cast members Sam Aaron and Barbara Hamilton. A few weeks later, Gordon Sinclair of The Toronto Star reported Stopwatch and Listen was cancelled "because it was so unfunny...[and] was replaced by a concert last night."

Producer Ross McLean later wrote that the show was "nothing but a trauma".

== Scheduling ==
This half-hour series debut was broadcast on Fridays at 9:00 p.m. (Eastern) from 12 September to 10 October 1952. Its time slot was filled by CBC Concert after this.
