= By Reason of Insanity (film) =

- Genre: Courtroom drama
- Screenplay by: David McLaren
- Directed by: Donald Shebib
- Starring: John Wildman, Patricia Collins, Michael Kirby, Barbara Williams, Hrant Alianak
- Country of origin: Canada
- Original language: English

Production
- Executive producer: Sam Levene
- Producer: Alan Burke
- Running time: 60 minutes
- Production company: CBC

Original release
- Network: CBC Television
- Release: March 7, 1982

By Reason of Insanity is a 1982 Canadian short courtroom drama television film written by David McLaren and directed by Donald Shebib which examines the use of insanity pleas in murder cases. The film was produced by Alan Burke and made for the anthology series For the Record.

== Synopsis ==
Teenager Mark Devlin (John Wildman) shoplifts a curved linoleum knife from a hardware store and then, seeing a customer pay for a television set in cash, follows the stranger to the parking lot. He attacks and brutally kills the man impulsively during the robbery by slitting his throat in full view of multiple witnesses and the victim's five-year-old son, who watches in stunned silence. Devlin is arrested almost immediately and charged with first-degree murder, a seemingly open and shut case.

Just because he's medically nuts doesn't mean he's legally nuts... The key word in Section 16 of the Criminal Code is "appreciate".

— Jane Dexter, By Reason of Insanity

Devlin's lawyer is young, bright and ambitious Jane Dexter (Patricia Collins). The only way Devlin can beat the rap is through an insanity plea, as specified in Section 16 (2) of the Criminal Code, which defines an insane person having a mental illness such that he cannot appreciate the "nature or quality of an act". Dexter must therefore argue that Devlin was insane when he killed his victim.

There are long preparations to defend Devlin. Psychiatrists try to evaluate him. But it is at the trial where it will be determined whether he is legally insane and therefore innocent or guilty.

Devlin's mother (Barbara Williams) testifies that her son was beaten by his father "but it never did any good." She never "really" knew him. He hurt people and "never cared that he did." Devlin testifies that he was unmoved by the killing of a man he did not know: "I didn't feel nothing... It was like a movie. The killing was a movie." The defence psychiatrist (Hrant Alianak) defines Devlin as a psychopath: impulsive, egocentric, and completely indifferent to the reactions of others. Furthermore, he is suffering from a "disorder of consciousness" and entered a "psychotic state" just before he killed.

The Crown introduces its own psychiatric evidence. The prosecutor (Michael Kirby) maintains that, since Devlin stole a knife with intent to commit murder, the act was premeditated.

The jury must decide whether the accused "appreciated" the nature of his act.

== Cast ==
- John Wildman as Mark Devlin, a "smouldering, sullen" young man on trial for first-degree murder.
- Patricia Collins as Jane Dexter, a "cool, professional," defence attorney.
- Michael Kirby as Richard Smith, a "smarmy" crown attorney, a bit of a "ham".
- Barbara Williams as Mrs. Devlin, Mark Devlin's mother
- Hrant Alianak as Dr. Gregarin

== Genre and themes ==
A courtroom drama, By Reason of Insanity is an exploration of the ethics and social consequences of the "humane and enlightened" insanity plea, which fell under Section 16 (2) of the Criminal Code. At the time the film was made, s. 16(2) stated: "a person is insane when he ... has a disease of the mind to an extent that renders him incapable of appreciating the nature or quality of the act." Questioning the "market" of expert witnesses and the adversarial system itself, the film asks who is served by the insanity defence.

For Donald Shebib, the question of legal responsibility for one's actions becomes a question of whether "anyone is morally responsible for anything," and then "Is there morality?" and "Is there a God?"

== Production ==
=== Background ===
For the Record was intended as a series of dramas which would take an honest look at problems in Canadian society, among them many about mental illness and "flawed social institutions". Gail Henley remarked in 1985 that For the Record dramas were "information laden" when compared to their more emotional American counterparts and emphasises the importance of research and documentation for the series.

=== Writing ===
By Reason of Insanity was the first of two dramas directed by Donald Shebib for the series. Shebib said he was not sure how the audience would respond to the "tricky subject matter," since it was not known whose side the audience would take: "I felt that one of the problems with the script was that it didn't make clear where sympathies should lie. Eventually, I decided I may as well stay on the tightrope and not come down on one side or another."

=== Casting and filming ===
In casting John Wildman as Mark Devlin, Shebib had been determined to cast "in a soft way, avoiding the stereotype of the drooling homicidal maniac", while for Jane Dexter he wanted someone cool and professional, "just someone doing a job."

By Reason of Insanity was filmed in Toronto over a two-week period in late October 1981. The last twenty minutes of the film take place in a courtroom, and as Shebib related: "The thing the courtroom scenes had going for them was a good sense of reality... We shot them in an actual courtroom in Toronto's old city hall and used real court clerks. That helped a lot."

== Release ==
By Reason of Insanity was first broadcast on 7 March 1982, at a time when revelations of the Clifford Olson serial murders were still fresh in the minds of the audience. Shebib remarked: "We couldn't have lucked out better... With the public interest in the Olson case, this will have enormous topicality."

=== Distribution ===
The film was sold to overseas markets in Curaçao, Trinidad, Jamaica, Singapore, Philippines, Israel and New Zealand.

=== Broadcast rights and home media ===
The film was also sold to cable channels in the United Kingdom and United States, and released in video formats in South Africa and Scandinavia.

== Reception ==
=== Critical response ===
Reviewing For the Record's 1982 season of dramas, Bill MacVicar judged By Reason of Insanity to be the best, "well-crafted" and displaying "praiseworthy equilibrium" and found it "refreshing" that the film withholds editorial judgement:

By Reason of Insanity questions the market in "expert" witnesses and the adversarial system itself, but it leaves us with a disturbing paradox. ... Who is best served, the drama asks. The answer seems to be neither the accused nor society, but the victorious lawyer.

Wessley Hicks calls the film "a terse, spare, provoking drama", that, while making no judgments, does create uneasiness. Mike Boone was impressed by John Wildman, who he found projects everyone's "nightmare image of adolescent menace alternately unfeeling and touchingly vulnerable, impulsive and full of pent-up hostility." He also found the film as a whole was a "refreshing change" from American TV trial scenes from Perry Mason on down: "No cries of "Objection!" every two minutes, no histrionics or long-winded oratory by flamboyant attorneys." Moreover, the film offers "fascinating insights into the workings of the Canadian legal system" and psychiatric testimony.

=== Accolade ===
David McLaren was nominated for an ACTRA Award for his screenplay.
