= Gallery (TV series) =

Canadian documentary television program

- Genre: Documentary
- Country of origin: Canada
- Original language: English
- No. of seasons: 2

Production
- Executive producer: Sam Levene
- Producer: David Pears
- Running time: 30 minutes

Original release
- Network: CBC Television
- Release: 19 May 1973 – 4 April 1975

Gallery is a Canadian documentary television program that aired on CBC Television from 1973 to 1979.

== Premise ==
This series featured various documentaries, taking an approach which was less serious than usual.

== Scheduling ==
This half-hour series was first broadcast on Saturdays at 10:00 p.m. (Eastern) from 19 May to 11 August 1973. It was rebroadcast on Wednesdays at 10:00 p.m. from 10 October to 7 November 1973. The second and final season of original episodes was from 3 January to 4 April 1975 on Fridays at 10:30 p.m. Further rebroadcasts were shown on CBC as mid-year programming in 1977 and 1979.

== Episodes ==
Documentaries featured during the series run included the following:

- Bluegrass Country (Bob Fresco, Max Engel), featuring a music festival in The Ozarks
- The Bricklin Story (Pen Densham, John Watson, Insight Productions), featuring Malcolm Bricklin and his SV-1 automobile
- The Master Blasters, featuring a family-run demolition company
- To Be A Clown (Paul Saltzman), featuring an Ottawa-based clown school
- Whatever Became of Hollywood? (Eric Riisna director), an adaptation of Richard Lamparski's biographies on historic entertainers
- Winning Is The Only Thing (Donald Shebib director), concerning a minor league hockey team in Manitoba
