= Riel (film) =

1979 film

- Genre: Biography; Drama; War
- Written by: Roy Moore
- Directed by: George Bloomfield
- Starring: Raymond Cloutier; Christopher Plummer; Roger Blay; Lloyd Bochner; James Bradford
- Theme music composer: William McCauley
- Country of origin: Canada
- Original language: English

Production
- Executive producer: Stanley Colbert
- Producer: John Trent
- Cinematography: Vic Sarin
- Editor: Myrtle Virgo
- Running time: 150 minutes

Original release
- Network: CBC
- Release: April 15, 1979

Riel is a 1979 Canadian made-for-television biographical film about Métis leader Louis Riel.

== Plot ==
Louis Riel leads the Red River and North-West Rebellions against the Canadian government's expansionist ideas. The first was a successful rebellion in which created the Province of Manitoba and a later more violent and unsuccessful one in Saskatchewan in 1885 which led to his capture, trial and eventual execution

== Cast ==
- Raymond Cloutier as Louis Riel
- Christopher Plummer as Prime Minister John A. Macdonald
- Roger Blay as Gabriel Dumont
- Maury Chaykin as Howard
- Barry Morse as William Mactavish
- Leslie Nielsen as Major Leif Newry Fitzroy Crozier
- Dave Thomas as Militia Captain
- William Shatner as The Barker
- Don Harron as Donald Smith
- Chris Wiggins as General Frederick Dobson Middleton
- John Neville as General Garnet Wolseley
- Lloyd Bochner as Dr. John Christian Schultz
- James Bradford as Captain Bradshaw
- Brenda Donohue as Agnes Schultz
- Marcel Sabourin as Joseph-Noël Ritchot
- Gary Reineke as Thomas Scott
- Fern Henry as Maguerite Riel
- Tony Robinow as Lemieux

== Production ==
The film was shot at Cinespace Film Studios in Kleinburg, Ontario, with additional photography at Ottawa, Ontario. The production utilized the local community to fulfill extra roles and stunt riders. Community members like Jim Naish, and others, earned a spot with their shooting and riding abilities.

== Release ==
Prior to its showing on television, a special premiere showing of the film was done at the Governor General's residence in Ottawa (Government House). Prior to the viewing, a private dinner was held with Jean Allard and Joe Teillet, descendants of Riel; Willie Dumont, a descendant of Gabriel Dumont; Eric Wells, who discovered the Riel diaries; and E. B. Osler, author of a book on Riel. The full cast and director attended the screening, as well as Al Johnson, president of the CBC, who introduced the film as "what the CBC is all about".
