= List of The Elephant Show episodes =

The Elephant Show (from the second season onward, Sharon, Lois & Bram's Elephant Show) is a Canadian children's television series, starring children's entertainers Sharon, Lois & Bram and made for CBC Television. The series premiered on October 8, 1984 and ended on February 26, 1989, with a total of 65 episodes over the course of 5 seasons. The show also aired on Nickelodeon's Nick Jr. block in the United States starting in 1987.

== Series overview ==
Season	Episodes	Originally released	
Season	Episodes	First released	Last released
1	13	October 8, 1984	December 31, 1984
2	13	January 6, 1986	March 31, 1986
3	13	October 6, 1986	December 29, 1986
4	13	October 5, 1987	January 4, 1988
5	13	October 31, 1988	February 26, 1989

== Episodes ==
=== Season 1 (1984) ===
No. overall	No. in season	Title	Directed by	Written by	Guest(s)	Original release date
1	1	"Schoolyard"	Stan Swan	Mark Shekter	Bob Schneider	October 8, 1984
Sharon, Lois & Bram, Elephant and Eric Nagler spend the day at school, where it's Elephant's first day of class.
2	2	"Farm Show"	Stan Swan	Mark Shekter	Scott Woods	October 15, 1984
Elephant, Sharon, Lois & Bram and Eric Nagler explore life on a farm.
3	3	"Picnic"	Stan Swan	Mark Shekter	Canadian Children's Dance Theatre	October 22, 1984
The gang goes on a picnic in the park.
4	4	"Friendship"	Stan Swan	Mark Shekter	Ann Mortifee	October 29, 1984
Elephant, Sharon, Lois & Bram and Eric Nagler explore the meaning of friendship.
5	5	"Food Show"	Stan Swan	Mark Shekter	Circus Shmirkus	November 5, 1984
The gang spends the day preparing a feast, but when they forget about their concert they have to rush out and leave the feast behind.
6	6	"Elephant's Doctor"	Ted Regan	Mark Shekter	Nion	November 12, 1984
When Elephant becomes ill, his doctor spends the day with Sharon, Lois & Bram instead. Note: This was intended to be the pilot episode of the show and was supposed to air first, but it wound up being aired the sixth episode.
7	7	"Amusement Park"	Stan Swan	Mark Shekter	Denis Simpson	November 19, 1984
Elephant, Sharon, Lois & Bram and Eric Nagler spend the day at Toronto's Centreville Island Amusement Park.
8	8	"Rainy Day"	Stan Swan	Mark Shekter	National Tap Dance Company	November 26, 1984
The rain outside causes Elephant, Sharon, Lois & Bram, Eric Nagler and the kids to spend the day finding what there is to do inside on a rainy day.
9	9	"Zoo"	Stan Swan	Mark Shekter	Paul Gaulin	December 3, 1984
The gang spends the day at the Toronto Metro Zoo where Marlow and Elephant get lost and need help finding their way back to Sharon, Lois & Bram.
10	10	"Lifestyles"	Stan Swan	Mark Shekter	Fred Penner	December 10, 1984
Elephant, Sharon, Lois & Bram, Eric Nagler and the kids spend the day reminiscing of times past with a photo album.
11	11	"Neighbourhood"	Stan Swan	Mark Shekter	Whole Loaf Theatre	December 17, 1984
When the kids are bored, Sharon, Lois & Bram, Elephant and Eric Nagler decide to explore what there is to do in their neighbourhood.
12	12	"Party"	Stan Swan	Mark Shekter	Bob Berky	December 24, 1984
Sharon, Lois & Bram have a party at the studio and invite friends and a clown to share the festivities.
13	13	"Camp"	Stan Swan	Mark Shekter	Susan Mendelson	December 31, 1984
Elephant, Sharon, Lois & Bram and Eric Nagler go camping at summer camp.

=== Season 2 (1986) ===
No. overall	No. in season	Title	Directed by	Guest(s)	Original release date
1	1	"Funny Field Day"	George Broomfield	John Pattison & Garlou	January 6, 1986
Neighborhood friends are invited to Sharon, Lois & Bram's annual picnic where they play lots of games and have a great time.
2	2	"Masquerade"	Stan Swan	Maya	January 13, 1986
Sharon, Lois & Bram and Elephant reminisce with Eric Nagler about a frightful Halloween party from the past.
3	3	"Reversal"	George Broomfield	John Allan Cameron	January 20, 1986
Elephant and the children think its time they ran things instead of adults, so Sharon, Lois & Bram agree to change roles for the day. John Allen stops by and recounts the backwards tale of Rindercella.
4	4	"Marathon"	Stan Swan	Denis Simpson	January 27, 1986
Elephant is chosen to run in a marathon to help raise money for the community center's new musical instruments. In order to train for the event, Denis Simpson comes over to help out.
5	5	"Clean-Up"	Stan Swan	Nancy White	February 3, 1986
Elephant, Sharon, Lois & Bram and the kids think they are doing Eric Nagler a favor when they clean up his messy garage, but when he comes home, he is more than surprised.
6	6	"Kensington Market"	Stan Swan	The Inter-Community Group	February 10, 1986
Sharon, Lois & Bram and Eric Nagler take a quick trip to Kensington Market in between concerts to help Elephant try some new foods instead of his usual fare of peanuts.
7	7	"Babysitting"	Stan Swan	Circus Shmirkus	February 17, 1986
Due to Elephant's antics, Sharon, Lois & Bram end up babysitting a handful of kids.
8	8	"Hobby"	Stan Swan	Major Conrad Flapps	February 24, 1986
Everyone spends the day exploring different kinds of hobbies so that Elephant can find one.
9	9	"Pioneer Village"	Stan Swan	The Leahy Family	March 3, 1986
Sharon, Lois & Bram and Elephant explore Pioneer Village during apple harvest time and discover the various aspects of life in the 1860s. The day is filled with fun and old time fiddling and dancing!
10	10	"Dance School"	Stan Swan	The Dancesmiths of George Brown College	March 10, 1986
Elephant, Sharon, Lois & Bram and Eric Nagler are invited to a school for performing arts, and Elephant decides to be a ballet dancer! The Dancesmiths show Elephant the dedication and hard-work that dancing requires.
11	11	"Beach Show"	Stan Swan	The Flying Dutchmen	March 17, 1986
The gang spends the day at the beach, but Elephant has a cold.
12	12	"Sleepover"	George Bloomfield	The Potato People	March 24, 1986
Sharon, Lois & Bram invite some neighborhood kids and Eric Nagler over to their studio for a sleepover.
13	13	"Treasure Hunt"	Stan Swan	Naomi Tyrell	March 31, 1986
A mysterious letter arrives with a clue that sends Sharon, Lois & Bram on a musical treasure hunt with an extra special treasure awaiting them at the end.

=== Season 3 (1986) ===
From this season onwards, Elephant is a female character.

No. overall	No. in season	Title	Directed by	Guest(s)	Original release date
1	1	"Duet Show"	Terry Maskell	Jim & John Coburn	October 6, 1986
Sharon, Lois & Bram and Elephant take a look at pairs, twins and things that go together.
2	2	"Treasure Island"	George Bloomfield	The Nylons	October 13, 1986
The kids discover a treasure map in Sharon, Lois & Bram's closet and everyone embarks on an adventure to find the treasure, with some unexpected results.
3	3	"Overnight"	Wayne Moss	Reverend Ken & The Washboard Supper Club	October 20, 1986
The gang goes on an overnight camping trip and run into some very noisy and strange neighbours.
4	4	"Caribana"	Terry Maskell	Panman Pat McNeilly	October 27, 1986
The gang takes part in a Caribbean Caribana Festival complete with costumes, and floats. They learn about brotherhood and peace at the same time.
5	5	"Fairy Tale"	Stan Swan	Tony Molesworth	November 3, 1986
Elephant stars in a play called "CinderElephant" and Sharon, Lois & Bram and all the kids play supporting roles.
6	6	"Grandma Bessie's Birthday"	George Bloomfield	Fred Bean	November 10, 1986
When one of the children has a birthday on the same day as her grandmother, Sharon, Lois & Bram decide to stage a dual celebration at the Senior Citizen's Home where the girl's grandmother lives.
7	7	"Who Stole the Cookies?"	George Bloomfield	Bob Berky	November 17, 1986
Lois bakes sixty cookies and later discovers that all but one have disappeared. Elephant plays sleuth in the case of the missing cookies!
8	8	"Soap Box Derby"	George Bloomfield	Ron Rubin (voice actor)	November 24, 1986
Sharon, Lois & Bram and Elephant help the children construct a soapbox and they all enter it in an exciting soap box derby.
9	9	"Library"	Wayne Moss	Carol Robinson	December 1, 1986
Sharon, Lois & Bram and Elephant take the children to the library where they all find their own special books. Fantasy takes over when Elephant finds a book that inspires her imagination.
10	10	"Topsy-Turvy Elephant"	Stan Swan	Luba Goy	December 8, 1986
Sharon, Lois & Bram and Elephant have fun doing things backwards for a day, with some pretty topsy-turvy results!
11	11	"There's An Elephant Up That Tree!"	George Bloomfield	Maury Chaykin	December 15, 1986
Elephant unexpectedly takes refuge up in a tree. Sharon, Lois & Bram try everything they can think of to get Elephant down, but have to resort to calling the fire department instead. The filming location was at Rennie Park in Western Toronto.
12	12	"Growing Up"	George Bloomfield	Valdy	December 22, 1986
Everyone spends the day exploring different kinds of careers and Elephant comes up with some interesting career ideas of her own.
13	13	"Hospital"	Stan Swan	Ron Wagner	December 29, 1986
When one of the children goes to the hospital to have his tonsils removed, Sharon, Lois & Bram and Elephant take the kids for a surprise visit to the Hospital For Sick Kids' Tonsil Ward.

=== Season 4 (1987–88) ===
No. overall	No. in season	Title	Directed by	Guest(s)	Original release date
1	1	"Urban Cowboy"	Wayne Moss	Murray McLauchlan	October 26, 1987
Bronte Creek Park sets the scene for fun on the farm and a hayride with Murray who entertains all with his Juno Award winning classic, "The Farmer's Song".
2	2	"SuperElephant: The Movie"	Wayne Moss	Bruce Pirrie	October 19, 1987
The kids get together to make their own movie: Someone's been stealing all the peanut butter from the children's homes around the city and SuperElephant sets out to save the day and catch the culprit "butter"-handed.
3	3	"Cooking School"	Eleanore Lindo	Sam Moses	October 5, 1987
Elephant's interest in cooking lands Sharon, Lois & Bram, Eric Nagler and the kids in the middle of a zany cooking lesson with a madcap chef! Things get extra wild when Sharon, Lois & Bram bring out their dessert cart.
4	4	"Mother Goose"	Wayne Moss	Roy Wordsworth & Don Cullen	November 2, 1987
A day of child care turns into fantasy fun amidst a fairy glade forest when playmates Wee Willie Winkie and Terrence McDiddler entertain with nostalgic delight.
5	5	"Pet Fair"	Stan Swan	Max the Dog	November 9, 1987
Excitement abounds as Sharon, Lois & Bram and the neighborhood kids gear up for the community pet fair. Talking rabbits, Bram's pet rock, Sharon & Lois' pet goldfishes, Eric's pet flea, and more join in the fun!
6	6	"Blackout"	Stan Swan	Robert Desrosiers	November 16, 1987
It's Elephant's birthday and the day is filled with fun, magic and many splendid surprises even when the electricity goes out. Elephant's birthday wish comes true as Robert invites Elephant to dance a duet to the tune of Waddaly Atcha with him.
7	7	"Newspaper"	Eleanore Lindo	The Beirdo Brothers & Sister Sheila	November 23, 1987
The gang earn their press cards when their newly formed neighborhood newspaper scoops one of the hottest exclusives in town!
8	8	"Snow White Elephant"	Stan Swan	Jayne Eastwood	November 30, 1987
In what is quickly becoming a series tradition, Sharon, Lois & Bram bring a beloved fairy tale back to life - with a few fun filled changes! Jayne Eastwood stars as the Evil Queen in this tribute to the 50th Anniversary of the Snow White Legend.
9	9	"An Elephant Never Forgets"	Richard Mortimer	The Shuffle Demons	December 7, 1987
An elephant never forgets. Unless, of course, it is plagued by a case of pachyderm amnesia. Sharon, Lois & Bram search for Elephant and try to get her to regain her memory just in time for the trio's big concert!
10	10	"Radio Show"	Richard Mortimer	Ron Rubin	December 14, 1987
A mysterious antique radio possesses the ability to transport Sharon, Lois & Bram and the kids back in time to radio's heyday! The gang gets to see what it is like inside a radio studio in this old-fashioned romp down memory lane.
11	11	"Sibling Rivalry"	Richard Mortimer	Kate & Anna McGarrigle	December 21, 1987
The arrival of Aunt Elephant and her new baby brings mixed feelings for Elephant. When Elephant becomes upset, Kate & Anna McGarrigle show Elephant that new additions to a family can be a trying but wonderful experience for other siblings.
12	12	"Elephant Finds Its Game"	Richard Mortimer	Toller Cranston	December 28, 1987
Elephant sets out to find her game. The gang tries everything from hula-hoops, to golfing, to hiking, to jogging, to doing nothing, but finally they discover Elephant's flair for figure skating with a special dance partner extraordinaire.
13	13	"Band on the Run"	Richard Mortimer	The Mammoth Band	January 4, 1988
Sharon, Lois & Bram and The Mammoth Band wind up on a wild goose chase to their next concert after the Elephant Show tour bus breaks down in the middle of nowhere! From roller skates to bicycles and wheelbarrows to wagons, the gang tries it all - because the show must go on!

=== Season 5 (1988–89) ===
This season does not feature the three in live concert segments.

No. overall	No. in season	Title	Directed by	Guest(s)	Original release date
1	1	"The Early Years"	Stan Swan	Louis Del Grande	December 11, 1988
The Elephant Show blasts into the past as Sharon, Lois & Bram reminisce about the early days and rekindle fond memories of their rise to fame and glory. Louis guest stars as the trio's fast talking, wise cracking agent "Willy Bookem".
2	2	"Unicef"	Stan Swan	Jayne Eastwood & Andrea Martin	October 31, 1988
As UNICEF Canada's newly appointed Canadian Ambassadors, Sharon, Lois & Bram join their friends in this humorous and uplifting lesson in caring and sharing. The whole gang teams up to share in the holiday spirit and put on the neighborhood's best Halloween ever!
3	3	"Elephant's Lamp"	Stan Swan	Rick Green	December 18, 1988
Elephant's discovery of a magic lamp at the street vendors leads to mayhem as Sharon, Lois & Bram and the kids try to figure out what to wish for and how to deal with an overly zealous genie!
4	4	"Moonlighting"	Stan Swan	Maurice Solway	January 1, 1989
When the neighborhood kids decide it's time for a new playground, Sharon, Lois & Bram kick into high gear to raise funds for the project. Mr Withers, played by Solway, however demands for a new park bench because his old one is uncomfortable.
5	5	"Museum"	Michael McNamara	Dan Redican	December 25, 1988
Following a day at the museum, Sharon, Lois & Bram and the gang find themselves locked in after hours! The night watchman finds himself unwillingly drawn into the adventures as the night prowls on.
6	6	"Playhouse"	Joan Tosoni	Taborah Johnson	January 8, 1989
Sharon, Lois & Bram and the kids encounter a disgruntled neighbor (Taborah Johnson) while building a playhouse in the backyard. The conflict with the neighbor ends when they complete their playhouse.
7	7	"Three Bears"	Douglas Williams	Chuck Mangione	January 15, 1989
Once again a traditional fairy tale is turned topsy-turvy in the hands of Sharon, Lois & Bram and the rest of the gang. The trio plays the three bears in this contemporary remake of the three-bears classic.
8	8	"Sunday in the Park"	Douglas Williams	Mendelson Joe	January 22, 1989
Elephant searches for her artistic forte in this episode a la Georges Seurat. Joe gives some insightful advice to Elephant.
9	9	"Curio Shoppe"	Allan Z. Novak	Barbara Hamilton	January 29, 1989
Sharon, Lois & Bram, Elephant and the kids discover a curious shop where their grandest wishes come true. The mysterious shopkeeper's bric-a-brac knick-knacks take the gang on an unforgettable journey into the world of imagination.
10	10	"Making A Record"	John Bertram	Joe Sealy	February 19, 1989
The kids follow Sharon, Lois & Bram into the studio for a day to learn the A to Z's of making a record. The kids and Eric Nagler plan a surprise for the trio for their 10th anniversary together.
11	11	"Young & Old"	Joan Tosoni	Jan Rubeš	February 12, 1989
Sharon, Lois & Bram and the kids discover that childhood has no age limits when they visit their old friend on the farm. The Interlink Choir helps bridge the generation gap between young and old.
12	12	"Awards Show"	Stan Swan	(none)	February 26, 1989
The neighbourhood kids and Eric Nagler plan a surprise of their own for Sharon, Lois & Bram: a trip down memory lane, looking back at the best moments throughout The Elephant Show. Everything from the Most Fabulous Face to Most Outrageous Mode of Transportation is covered in the series historical flashback.
13	13	"Birth of the Show"	John Bertram	Sneezy Waters	February 5, 1989
How did The Elephant Show begin anyway? Sharon, Lois & Bram and Eric Nagler answer the musical question "why?" in this nostalgic episode.
