= The Way It Is (TV program) =

- Genre: Current affairs
- Directed by: Garth Goddard; Ray McConnell; Jack Sampson
- Presented by: John Saywell
- Country of origin: Canada
- Original language: English
- No. of seasons: 2

Production
- Executive producer: Ross McLean
- Producers: Patrick Gossage; Peter Herrndorf; Perry Rosemond
- Running time: 60 minutes

Original release
- Network: CBC Television
- Release: 24 September 1967 – 29 June 1969

The Way It Is is a Canadian public affairs television program that aired on CBC Television from 1967 to 1969.

== Premise ==
Following the cancellations of Close-Up, Sunday and This Hour Has Seven Days, this new journalistic program occupied the traditional Sunday night current affairs time slot on CBC.

The set included three screens which displayed images projected from behind.

Jan Tennant was a script assistant who later became one of the network's announcers. Story editors included Barbara Amiel and Tim Kotcheff.

John Saywell, a Toronto professor, hosted the program. Other presenters included Warren Davis, Peter Desbarats, Ken Lefolii, Percy Saltzman, Patrick Watson and Moses Znaimer. Pierre Trudeau was among the program's guests.

The program often featured long-form documentaries. "Mr. Pearson", a profile of Prime Minister Lester B. Pearson, was originally completed in the mid-1960s. It was not broadcast until this program, after director Richard Ballentine made minor edits, added some narration and adjusted the audio mix. Douglas Leiterman (This Hour Has Seven Days) produced "Fasten Your Seatbelts: A Report on Airline Safety" as a co-production with the US Public Broadcasting Service. Donald Shebib produced films such as "San Francisco Summer 1967" and "Good Times Bad Times" for the program. Beryl Fox's documentary "Vietnam, Last Reflections on a War" was also featured.

Joni Mitchell wrote a theme song.(page 5)

The Way It Is was cancelled in 1969 by Knowlton Nash when he became chief of the CBC's news and public affairs.

== Scheduling ==
This hour-long program was broadcast on Sundays at 10:00 p.m. (Eastern). Its first season ran from 24 September 1967 to 23 June 1968, then its second season was from 29 September 1968 to 29 June 1969.
