= Where's Pete =

1986 Canadian short film

- Directed by: Jim Purdy
- Written by: Jim Purdy
- Produced by: Michael J. F. Scott
- Starring: Heath Lamberts; Nancy Beatty; Yannick Bisson
- Cinematography: Douglas Kiefer
- Edited by: Jeff Warren
- Music by: Glenn Morley; Lawrence Shragge
- Release date: 1986
- Running time: 26 minutes
- Country: Canada
- Language: English

Where's Pete is a Canadian drama short film, directed by Jim Purdy and released in 1986. The film stars Heath Lamberts and Nancy Beatty as parents grieving the recent death of their teenage son Pete (Yannick Bisson) in a car accident.

The film was a Genie Award nominee for Best Live Action Short Drama at the 8th Genie Awards.
