= To Kill a Clown =

1972 film by George Bloomfield

- Theatrical release poster
- Directed by: George Bloomfield
- Screenplay by: George Bloomfield; I. C. Rapoport
- Based on: The Master of the Hounds by Algis Budrys
- Produced by: Theodore B. Sills
- Starring: Alan Alda; Blythe Danner; Heath Lamberts; Eric Clavering
- Cinematography: Walter Lassally
- Edited by: Ralph Kemplen
- Music by: Richard Hill; John Hawkins
- Production company: Palomar Pictures
- Distributed by: 20th Century Fox
- Release date: August 23, 1972
- Running time: 84 minutes
- Country: United Kingdom
- Language: English

To Kill a Clown is a 1972 British psychological thriller horror film directed by George Bloomfield and written by Bloomfield and I. C. Rapoport. The film stars Alan Alda, Blythe Danner, Heath Lamberts and Eric Clavering. The film was released on August 23, 1972, by 20th Century Fox.

== Plot ==
Timothy Frischer (Heath Lamberts) is a hippie artist/painter who has been married for four years to Lily (Blythe Danner) a fellow hippie. Their marriage is shaky, so they agree to spend the summer together as a trial period at an isolated beach house on Choke Cherry Bay. They quarrel shortly after arriving and, when Lily threatens to leave, Timothy throws her suitcase into the water. Frustrated with his childish immaturity, Lily gets in the car to drive away, but Timothy jumps onto the moving vehicle, hangs onto the windshield and cajoles her into stopping. Although she is weary of his antics, she is also amused and decides to remain.

Their landlord and only neighbor for miles around is Major Evelyn Ritchie (Alan Alda), a Vietnam veteran about 10 years their senior who owns two highly trained Doberman Pinschers and walks with crutches due to one of his legs being amputated. When the Frischers meet Ritchie for the first time, Timothy fires off questions about garbage and other practicalities and repeatedly interrupts Lily. Although Ritchie chuckles at the Frischers' gentle bickering, Lily intuits that he is growing annoyed by Timothy's questioning and apologizes for their enthusiasm. Ritchie seems at first aloof, but surreptitiously watches them through their unshuttered windows. When they start to make love, he raps on the door and offers wine as a welcoming gift. Ritchie compliments the "feminine touch" within the beach house and looks troubled when Timothy takes credit for a table decoration. After Ritchie leaves, Lily scolds Timothy for his lack of hospitality and accuses him of needing to brood. Timothy admits he has a bad feeling about their landlord, but Lily disagrees with him. When Timothy tries to drive off in anger, Ritchie's dogs suddenly appear and viciously circle his car, frightening him into honking until Ritchie comes out of his house to call them off. Amused by Timothy's fear, Ritchie says condescendingly that the dogs are unfamiliar with his smell.

Another day later, as Lily and Ritchie walk along the beach, she explains that she met Timothy when he jumped out at her wearing a clown nose and made her laugh. Proudly, she explains that Timothy studied mime in Paris, art, photography and drawing. Aware of Ritchie's unspoken disapproval of Timothy, Lily adds that she hopes the beach house will bring out Timothy's good qualities. While talking, she strips down to her bikini in order to get a tan, embarrassing Ritchie. At her questioning, Ritchie admits that Timothy seems younger than his age, but evades answering her direct question of whether he thinks Timothy is immature. Lily points out that, while Ritchie feels certain about himself, Timothy "does not know who he is yet." Meanwhile, as Timothy is taking photographs of himself and the area, he encounters another bay resident, an older veteran named Stanley (Eric Clavering), who simply stares at him in amusement when he tries to start a conversation.

One night, Ritchie invites the couple to his house for dinner, where Lily and Timothy get inebriated. Lily asks Timothy to perform mime and his clown act. As Timothy prepares in another room, Lily, sensing Ritchie's disdain of Timothy and wanting his respect, tentatively explains that she is more than she may seem and makes the money in their household. Timothy then bursts into the room, with his face covered in shaving cream to imitate the white makeup of a mime and begins to perform "the definitive ape." This disappoints Lily, who prefers his clown act, but Ritchie comments that Timothy shows more concentration when he does his ape routine than he shows in the rest of his life. He points out that gorillas are usually seen behind bars and, claiming that the experience of prison focuses a person, convinces Timothy to agree to meet him at dawn for a psychological experiment.

The next morning, Ritchie wakens the hungover Timothy and, treating him like a subordinate in the military, orders him to carry a pile of rocks to the beach. Timothy treats it as a joke, but Ritchie insists that he carry out the task. Leaving one of the dogs to guard Timothy, Ritchie proceeds to the beach house, where he wakens Lily, and stands at the door to her bedroom until she gets up and dresses. Then, after asking if he can "borrow" items, he walks through the rooms and gathers knives, razors, belts and other implements that could be used as weapons. Although bewildered, Lily plays along, acknowledging that they are playing a "prison game." As Timothy continues to move the pile of rocks, Ritchie and Lily sit and watch from the beach house porch. When Timothy starts to take a break, Ritchie orders him to stand and hold a large rock, telling Lily that Timothy is undergoing the most therapeutic experience of his life. Ritchie informs Lily that, during American Revolutionary War battles, families of officers often watched from nearby. He also describes how he collected guns from the enemy corpses in Vietnam and that when he was wounded, someone stole his guns, believing he was dead. Unexpectedly, the dog attacks Timothy, causing him to bleed and, although the wound is minor, both Lily and Timothy panic.

In the evening, Timothy paints, ignoring Lily, who resumes a former smoking habit. At the same time, Stanley visits Ritchie, who shares with him military stories of tormenting subordinates, and their loud laughter, amplified by the water, unnerves Lily and Timothy. Later, the Frishers awaken to discover Ritchie towing away their car. When they go out to protest, the dogs threaten to attack them. During the night, Timothy tries to escape using the motorboat, forcing the frightened Lily to join him. However, the boat is cabled to the dock and Ritchie takes them back to the beach house, where he orders both dogs to guard them.

The next day, which happens to be the Fourth of July, American Legionnaires ceremoniously present Ritchie with a flag to honor his deceased father, a colonel, as part of an annual ritual. Afterward, while Timothy continues to move the rocks, Lily goes to Ritchie's house to talk. When she admits she is lonely, Ritchie asks if it is because of Timothy and promises that the situation will soon be different. She asks Ritchie's opinion of her and he says she needs a man, not a boy, who will bring her "peace and pleasure" that she has never known. Lily agrees that her soul is starved and, as Ritchie confides to her a story about a little girl he knew as a child, she removes her clothing, angering Ritchie. When she begs him to let them leave, he yells at her, forcing her to retreat, naked, to the beach house. Ritchie then shouts at Timothy, who has removed his shirt in the hot sun, and tells him to put it back on and button it up. Almost incoherently, he bellows that buttons are the difference between wild savages and civilization.

That night, still out of control, Ritchie prays for God to kill his enemies and burn them. He begs, "Bring fire on them!" and, as if on cue, a fireworks display commences, causing Ritchie to rejoice in sardonic glee. Meanwhile, Timothy pens up a dog and tries to barricade himself and Lily in the beach house. In retaliation, Ritchie shouts an attack command to the dogs and while Timothy fends off one of the dogs, Lily manages to stab the dog attacking him to death. Soon after, Ritchie gains entrance through a window and he and Timothy fight in the dark. Their struggling ends and Ritchie, lying on the ground exhausted, catches his breath. Near him lies Timothy, who, between bursts of fireworks, relives moments from his recent past. Shortly after, Lily announces that Timothy is dead.

== Cast ==
- Alan Alda as Maj. Evelyn Ritchie
- Blythe Danner as Lily Frischer
- Heath Lamberts as Timothy Frischer
- Eric Clavering as Stanley

== Production ==
The anti-war theme of the film caused the backers to want changes. Director Bloomfield refused script changes from the producer, and punched the producer. According to Bloomfield, he lost a chance to direct the film Sleuth. After filming was completed, the production team changed Bloomfield's filmed ending against his wishes, replacing it with filmed flashbacks.

== See also ==
- List of American films of 1972
