= A Great Big Thing =

1968 Canadian film

- Directed by: Eric Till
- Written by: Terence Heffernan
- Produced by: Pierre Patry; Martin Rosen
- Starring: Reni Santoni; Louise Latraverse; Paul Sand
- Cinematography: Jean-Claude Labrecque
- Edited by: Ralph Rosenblum
- Music by: Robert Prince
- Production company: Argofilm
- Release date: June 23, 1968 (Berlin)
- Running time: 80 minutes
- Country: Canada
- Language: English

A Great Big Thing is a Canadian-American comedy-drama film, directed by Eric Till and released in 1968. The film stars Reni Santoni as Vinny Shea, an aimless young man and aspiring writer who gets into various misadventures around Montreal while trying to write his first novel.

The film's cast also included Louise Latraverse, Paul Sand, Marcy Plotnick, Gerard Parkes, François Yves Carpentier, Roberta Maxwell, Leon Pownall and Heath Lamberts.

Screenwriter Terence Heffernan had originally submitted the film's screenplay to the CBC Television drama anthology series Festival, but after Till signed on as director, he instead opted to make the film independently with the participation of the American Argo Films studio.

The film premiered in 1968 at the 18th Berlin International Film Festival as part of Young Canadian Film, a non-competitive program highlighting recent films by new and emerging Canadian film directors. It had its Canadian premiere in 1970 at Gerald Pratley's Ontario Film Institute.
