= Of All People =

- Genre: Biography
- Country of origin: Canada
- Original language: English
- No. of seasons: 3

Production
- Executive producer: Ross McLean
- Running time: 30 minutes

Original release
- Network: CBC Television
- Release: 12 June 1972 – 2 January 1974

Of All People is a Canadian biographical television program that aired on CBC Television from 1972 to 1974.

== Premise ==
This program featured profiles of Canadians who were not celebrities, such as couple Fred and Mary Allison celebrating a 50th anniversary, octogenarian coin and stamp collector Vinnie Green, Newfoundlander Leonard Evans and his 14 children, and Uxbridge Township dogcatcher Anne Barrett. One episode included poet Al Purdy who later received the Order of Canada and Order of Ontario.

== Production ==
Segment producers included Martyn Burke, Martin Lavut and Donald Shebib. The theme music for the series was a song called "You of All People", written and performed by Jack Schechtman. The song was released on his album, "From Soup to Nuts".

== Scheduling ==
This half-hour program was broadcast on Mondays at 10:00 p.m. (Eastern) from 12 June to 21 August 1972. It returned the following year on Sundays at 10:30 p.m. from 27 May to 19 August 1973, then finally Mondays at 10:00 p.m. from 3 June to 2 September 1974.
