= Good Times, Bad Times (film) =

1969 documentary by Donald Shebib

- Genre: Documentary
- Screenplay by: Donald Shebib
- Directed by: Donald Shebib
- Narrated by: Jon Granik
- Country of origin: Canada
- Original language: English

Production
- Executive producer: Ross McLean
- Cinematography: Donald Shebib
- Editor: Donald Shebib
- Running time: 40 minutes
- Production company: CBC Television

Original release
- Network: CBC Television
- Release: May 4, 1969

Good Times, Bad Times is a 1969 Canadian short television documentary film created by Donald Shebib with narration by Jon Granik featuring interviews with veterans intercut by wartime footage. Shebib's presentation of war and the social status of Canada's veterans is blunt and "non-romanticized". The film was well-received and is Shebib's most distinguished short film. It won the Canadian Screen Award for Best Feature Length Documentary.

== Synopsis ==
War's so terrible we can only remember the good things, and there weren't many of them. Nobody wants to remember the bad things.

— A Canadian veteran of the First World War, Good Times, Bad Times (as quoted by The Ottawa Citizen)

Combat footage and old photographs from extant BBC documentary footage from the First and Second World Wars is intercut with contemporary footage of First World War veterans recalling their experiences at Royal Canadian Legion halls, memorial day commemorations and veterans' hospitals.

The war scenes include "some particularly brutal footage" of the Normandy landings, rest areas, WAACs dancing in slow motion with combat soldiers... "and then, the grim shaky records of the next campaigns—artillery barrage, automatic-weapons fire cutting down the distant running figures, and a final sweep of slumped corpses, obscene, rotting, flies unaffected by the presence of the camera." The last corpse dissolves into a still of a laughing teenaged private and then the photograph itself dissolves into a veteran in the pub.

Shebib lashes out at a society which casts aside its war veterans like so much embarrassing refuse, only to make limp, appreciative gestures each Nov. 11. The film is a taut synthesis of sound and images threatening to explode onscreen.

— Geoff Pevere, writing for The Charlatan

The war footage blurs in time between 1917 and 1945, in people between German and Allied forces, and battlefields, between Passchendaele, Tobruk, Ypres, Normandy, and St. Julien. At the ceremony, the veterans stand solemnly and remove their hats as The Last Post sounds over them and echoes through rooms of companies stricken with palsy, amputatations, resectioning, and senility. A light-show of night combat flares over the screen with searchlights, bombardment and incineration accompanied by an acid rock raga.

Final scenes include a few old friends who watch a BBC documentary of their campaigns with little reaction and a compilation of 1944 liberation sequences, returning to wards of bedridden and semi-conscious veterans. An elderly little man sings "God Save the Queen" facing the viewer and then says "I'm tired now, put me to bed" as the camera zooms in for a close up of his face.

== Themes and interpretations ==
Geoff Pevere remarks that the documentary was made at a time when "those who made war" were an unsympathetic subject, and is in that sense about "the marginalized and the misunderstood." The veterans are "sidelined relics", which galvanizes Shebib's empathy for them. However, as Ian McKay and Jamie Swift note, Shebib "shuns all patriotic tropes", and presents the audience images with a sense of irony that would have done Paul Fussell proud, for example juxtaposing "an ironically absurd war song" along with Gustav Holst's The Planets orchestral suite and a "throbbing rock anthem". Good Times, Bad Times subverts past documentaries on the subject such that the ordinary becomes "savage, and the obvious arcane", as Mark McCarthy puts it in his review, and then proceeds to interpret a central scene in phenomenological terms:

The last corpse dissolves to a beautiful old still of some teen-age private, hair awry, laughing in delight at something off-camera, and we know they are the same person. But then the lovely photograph dissolves to a toothless veteran in the pub, his face blank in some mindless odyssey, and we know that he was that boy, once; and by some magic we in the audience are all three, stinking carrion, bright youth, and haunted age. Our hearts begin to break with memories of wars we never fought in.

== Production ==
Good Times, Bad Times was made for the CBC Television documentary series The Way It Is. Its working title was The Veterans.

=== Filming ===
Shot on black and white 16 mm film and intercut with documentary footage from many films made decades earlier, Shebib's film makes use of what Mark McCarty refers to as "double-frame printing", which makes the veterans' pace in half-step appear "out of sync" with the viewer.

=== Sound and music ===
Shebib's musical selections for the film ranged from classical to contemporary rock. Mark McCarty describes John Granik's narration as "sometimes laconic, only reminiscent names of half-forgotten battlegrounds," and at other times, "consciously poetic" in the vein of Wilfred Owen or Siegfried Sassoon.

== Release ==
=== Broadcast history ===
The documentary aired for the first time at 10 pm (EST) Sunday 4 May 1969, four days before VE Day.

Good Times, Bad Times was rebroadcast on 11 November 1970 (Remembrance Day) and again in 1974 for the programme Such Is Life. On 7 November 1992 it aired as the eighth episode of The Passionate Eye, a documentary series which runs on the CBC News Network channel.

=== Home media and streaming ===
As of 2013, Good Times, Bad Times, which is Shebib's favourite of his entire repertoire, is unavailable for viewing in any format.

== Reception ==
=== Critical response ===
==== Contemporary ====
Mark McCarty was unsettled at first by the documentary's formal design, but this gave way to admiration for the director's "craft and imagination", its "elegance in its passion."

This is a young Canadian's very personal and original rendering of our elders' blackest nightmare; the savage and insane armed slaughter of the two great wars. In its effect, the film lies somewhere between Huston's [Edge of Darkness] and Renais's Night and Fog, but it resembles neither in conception or materials.

Peter Harcourt came away from the film asking "For who, finally, won the war? Certainly not the people who fought it", and wrote of a difficult-to-describe feeling evoked by the closing poetic lines, images, and music, "creating a rich emotional effect", a "fusion of exhilaration plus a sense of loss, a movement into accusation and uselessness."

Shebib himself said that Good Times, Bad Times "turned people's heads around" by explaining another point of view, as had been true of a lot of his films.

==== Retrospective ====
The Canadian Film Encyclopedia describes the "moving and powerful documentary" as a "personal, passionate elegy for the past," and a "tautly structured, elegantly crafted dirge" reflecting the guilt and madness of war.

It benefits from the inherent sense of irrelevance that serves as the central mood for virtually all of Shebib's films, and has been justly compared to such pacifist classics as Georges Franju's Hôtel des Invalides (1952) and Alain Resnais's Night and Fog (1955).

Geoff Pevere calls the documentary a "wrenching portrait" of the "forgotten war vets", the most "eloquent attainment" of the balancing act of passion and objectivity by Shebib as a non-fiction filmmaker. The film is a powerful statement against countercultural narcissism and "an indictment against collective memory". Referencing Harcourt's writing above, he argues that the sense of "uselessness" is the "real horror and tragedy in this film, the idea that these men, of all men, have become somehow redundant."

The film is on Piers Handling's list of top 100 Canadian films.

=== Accolades ===
Good Times, Bad Times is Donald Shebib's most distinguished short film, winning Canadian Film Awards for Best Feature Length Documentary and Sound Design in 1969.
