= Heath Lamberts =

Canadian actor

- Born: James Langcaster; December 15, 1941; Toronto, Ontario, Canada
- Died: February 22, 2005 (aged 63); Pittsburgh, Pennsylvania, US
- Education: National Theatre School of Canada
- Occupation: actor
- Years active: 1968-2002
- Spouse(s): Carole MacOmber, Louise Silk
- Parent(s): Cyril and Patricia Langcaster

Heath Lamberts, CM (December 15, 1941 – February 22, 2005) was a Canadian dramatic and comedic actor of stage, film, and television.

== Early life and education ==
Lamberts was born James Lancaster in Toronto, Ontario, the eldest son of Cyril and Patricia Langcaster, a factor worker and retail clerk (respectively).

As a boy, he and his brothers John and Raymond performed pantomime shows for senior citizens and Kiwanis groups. Heath won singing contests at school, allowing him to perform with Toronto's Opera Festival Association. In high school, he took a two-year course in art before leaving to study acting.

Lamberts took an apprenticeship at Vineyard Theatre near Niagara Falls, learning his craft from stars such as Tallulah Bankhead and Jack Carter. In 1960 he was admitted into the National Theatre School of Canada (NTS) in Montreal and graduated in 1963. At the NTS, Lamberts came under the tutelage of George Bloomfield, who cast Lamberts in the play The Red Eye of Love in Toronto in 1962, although still studying acting.

He also studied mime in Paris, France, at Le Coq d'Or.

He pursued the arts as a career, changing his name to Heath Lamberts.

== Career ==
Lamberts worked extensively in theaters across Canada, especially at the Shaw Festival and the Stratford Festival, where he grew into a great comedic actor, starring in popular farces such as Rookery Nook and One for the Pot. From 1982 to 1983 he played the demanding title role of Cyrano de Bergerac. On Broadway his longest role was in the original cast of Beauty and the Beast as Cogsworth. In later years, he performed numerous roles in Pittsburgh theatre.

Although most prominently a stage actor, he also had more than twenty roles in theatrical and made-for-television films including A Great Big Thing (1968), Where's Pete (1986), and Sam & Me (1991), as well as appearances on television series such as Counterstrike (1991), Law & Order (1996), and Remember WENN (1998).

== Awards and honors ==
Lamberts was inducted as a Member of the Order of Canada in 1987 by Queen Elizabeth II and the Governor General of Canada to recognize his distinction as an actor.

He won a Dora Mavor Moore Award (the "Toronto Tony") for his role in the 1996 Toronto rivival of One for the Pot.

The Pittsburgh Post Gazette named Lamberts, "Performer of the Year" (2000) for his central role in Quills at the Pittsburgh Playhouse.

== Personal life ==
Lamberts was married to Carole Macomber, stage manager for the Shaw Festival, for a brief period in the 1980s. He later had an eight year relationship with Louise Silk, a Pittsburgh artist. Lamberts was a recovering alcoholic with a twenty-three year membership in Alcoholics Anonymous, in which he was an inspiration to his friends.

== Death ==
Lamberts died at UPMC Shadyside in Pittsburgh, Pennsylvania, US, on February 22, 2005, from cancer. He was cremated. His ashes were sprinkled into the Allegheny River afterwards.

== Theatre ==
Some of Lamberts' many stage roles include the following.

- 1982–1983: Cyrano de Bergerac as Cyrano de Bergerac – Shaw Festival, Niagra-on-the-Lake
- 1994–: Beauty and the Beast as Cogsworth
- 1996: One for the Pot – Toronto revival
- 1997: Once Upon a Mattress as King Sextimus – Broadway's Broadhurst Theatre
- 1998: A Midsummer Night's Dream as Bottom – Pittsburgh Public Theater
- 1999: Gross Indecency as Marquis of Queensbury – City Theatre
- 2000: Quills – Pittsburgh Playhouse
- 2000: La Bête – Pittsburgh Playhouse
- 2001: By Jeeves as Sir Watkyn Basset – Pittsburgh Public Theater
- 2002: La Bête as Title role – Playhouse Rep
- 2003: Hamlet as Gravedigger – Pittsburgh Playhouse
- 2003: Macbeth as Porter
- 2003: Uncle Vanya as Telegin – Pittsburgh Irish & Classical Theatre
- 2004: e-lectricity – Pittsburgh Playhouse

== Filmography ==
Heath Lamberts film and television credits
Year	Title	Role	Notes	Ref.
1968	A Great Big Thing	Bill	Theatrical film	
1972	To Kill a Clown	Timothy Frischer	Theatrical film	
1980	Nothing Personal	Mr. Farkus	Theatrical film	
1986	Where's Pete	Dad	Short film	
1991	Sam & Me	Morris Cohen	Theatrical film	
1991	Street Legal	Steve Parker	1 episode	
1991	Counterstrike	Sheldon Blake	Episode: "Hidden Assets"	
1992	Alligator Pie	Mr. Hoobody	Television Film	
1993	Ordinary Magic	Mayor	Theatrical film	
1994	TekWar: TekLords	Gordon Chesterton	Television film	
1995	Tom and Huck	Schoolmaster Dobbins	Theatrical film	
1996	Law & Order	Forensic Handwriting Expert	Episode: "Trophy" (S6.E12)	
1998	More Tales of the City	Arnold Littlefield	TV miniseries	
1998	Remember WENN	Brian Wilburforce	1 episode	
2001	By Jeeves	Sir Watkyn Bassett	Television film (Video of the stage performance)	
