= Saturday Night Movies =

- Genre: Feature film presentation
- Country of origin: Canada
- Original language: English
- No. of seasons: 1

Production
- Running time: 120 minutes

Original release
- Network: CBC Television
- Release: 28 May – 1 October 1977

Saturday Night Movies is a Canadian film presentation that aired on CBC Television in 1977.

== Premise ==
Various feature films from Canada and other nations were presented during this time, as Saturday night replacement programming between hockey seasons.

== Scheduling ==
This normally two-hour series was broadcast on Saturdays from 8:30 p.m. from 28 May to 1 October 1977.

- 28 May 1977: Goldenrod
- 4 June 1977: Monty Python and the Holy Grail
- 11 June 1977: The Man Inside
- 18 June 1977: Love Among the Ruins
- 25 June 1977: I Will Fight No More Forever
- 2 July 1977: Wings in the Wilderness
- 9 July 1977: Guys and Dolls
- 16 July 1977: Wuthering Heights
- 23 July 1977: Sudden Fury
- 30 July 1977: (pre-empted for music special, The Magic Flute)
- 6 August 1977: The Bishop's Wife
- 13 August 1977: Between Friends
- 20 August 1977: The Secret Life of Walter Mitty
- 27 August 1977: Brethren
- 3 September 1977: Hans Christian Andersen
- 10 September 1977: Second Wind
- 17 September 1977: The Apprenticeship of Duddy Kravitz
- 24 September 1977: The Fighting Men (8 p.m.)
- 1 October 1977: Love is a Long Shot (9 p.m.)
