= George Bloomfield (cricketer) =

Australian cricketer

Personal information
- Full name: George Thomas Bloomfield
- Born: 5 February 1882; Adelaide, South Australia
- Died: 1 November 1958 (aged 76); Adelaide, South Australia
- Batting: Left-handed
- Role: Batsman

Domestic team information
- Years: Team
- 1908/09: South Australia

Career statistics
Competition	First-class
Matches	3
Runs scored	132
Batting average	26.40
100s/50s	0/1
Top score	65
Catches/stumpings	2/–
- Source: Cricinfo, 18 May 2018

George Thomas Bloomfield (5 February 1882 – 1 November 1958) was an Australian cricketer. He played three first-class matches for South Australia between 1908 and 1909.
