= Encounter (1960 TV program) =

- Genre: Talk show
- Presented by: Nathan Cohen
- Country of origin: Canada
- Original language: English
- No. of seasons: 1

Production
- Producer: Gordon Babineau
- Running time: 30 minutes

Original release
- Network: CBC Television
- Release: 9 October – 18 December 1960

Encounter is a Canadian talk show television program which aired on CBC Television in 1960.

== Premise ==
Nathan Cohen hosted this interview program with guests such as James Baldwin, Samuel Freedman, John Kenneth Galbraith, Stanley Kramer, Louis Kronenberger, Marshall McLuhan, Karl Shapiro and E. W. R. Steacie (National Research Council president).

== Scheduling ==
This half-hour program was broadcast on Sundays at 10:30 p.m. (Eastern) from 9 October to 18 December 1960. Encounter temporarily replaced Fighting Words, also hosted by Cohen.
