= Terence Heffernan =

Canadian screenwriter and playwright

- Born: October 10, 1941
- Died: 13 January 1998 (aged 56); Thailand
- Citizenship: Canada
- Occupations: Screenwriter and playwright
- Notable work: Heartaches

Terence Heffernan (October 10, 1941 – January 13, 1998) was a Canadian screenwriter and playwright. He was most noted for writing the film Heartaches, for which he won the Genie Award for Best Original Screenplay at the 3rd Genie Awards.

The son of former Montreal Canadiens hockey player Gerald Heffernan, Heffernan was educated at Lower Canada College. His theatrical play Blossom Hill was produced by Montreal's Shoestring Theatre in 1961. The play was also produced for television as part of Shoestring Theatre's CBC Television anthology series. He subsequently submitted a script to the CBC anthology series Festival; although it was not produced, it led to Eric Till directing his screenplay for A Great Big Thing in 1968.

Terry worked with Suzanne Findlay as his editor in his early Toronto days and later often worked with filmmaker Don Shebib.

His other film screenplays included Mahoney's Last Stand, The Young Adventurers and Change of Heart.

He died in 1997 of lung cancer in Thailand.
