= The Campbells =

Scottish-Canadian television drama series

- DVD cover
- Written by: Allan Prior
- Directed by: George Bloomfield, Timothy Bond
- Countries of origin: United Kingdom; Canada
- Original language: English
- No. of series: 4
- No. of episodes: 100

Production
- Producer: John Delmage
- Running time: 30 minutes
- Production companies: Scottish Television; CTV

Original release
- Network: ITV (UK); CTV (Canada)
- Release: April 4, 1986

The Campbells is a period drama television drama series produced by Scottish Television, an affiliate of British television network ITV, and Canadian television network CTV which ran from 1986 to 1990. The series starred Malcolm Stoddard as James Campbell, a Scottish doctor living in 1830s Upper Canada with his three children, seventeen-year-old Neil (John Wildman), fourteen-year old Emma (Amber-Lea Weston) and eleven-year-old John (Eric Richards). Cedric Smith played their neighbor, Captain Sims.

In Canada, it aired on CTV on Thursdays at 7:30 p.m. and in the United States on CBN on Saturdays at 7:00 p.m. The series also aired in the United Kingdom on ITV starting on 27 April 1986.

== Premise ==
The series begins in 1832 in Scotland, during the Highland Clearances, when many families were evicted from their homes. This led to a surge in immigration to Canada. Dr. James Campbell, a widower with three children, treated the broken leg of the son of a wealthy landowner but, after a servant woman applied unsterile folk remedies to the leg, the boy died of infection. Dr. Campbell was blamed for the death, and he lost his livelihood.

The Campbells heard of Canada's need for settlers and decide to start a new life in a new land. Dr. Campbell sets up a medical practice, and the entire family takes up farming as well.

The series has been described as the "Canadian Little House on the Prairie" but producer John Delmage stated that, while The Campbells might be similar to Little House, "we don’t have as much sugar."

== Production ==
The series was given a green light in 1985 with production stating in June of that year. Most of the episodes were shot on location at a fifty acre farm owned by the Ontario Heritage Foundation, and all clothing, furnishings, and the doctor's medical treatments were historically accurate.

The premiere episode was partly filmed in Scotland, as were two episodes broadcast in 1989, when Dr. Campbell and his daughter, Emma, briefly return to their native country.

== Cast ==
- Malcolm Stoddard as Dr. James Campbell
- John Wildman as Neil Campbell
- Amber-Lea Weston as Emma Campbell
- Eric Richards as John Campbell
- Cedric Smith as Captain Thomas Sims
- Brigit Wilson as Harriet Sims
- Wendy Lyon as Rebecca Sims
- Barbara Kyle as Charlotte Logan
- Rosemary Dunsmore as Mary McTavish

== Episodes ==
=== Season 1 ===
No. overall	No. in season	Title	Directed by	Written by	Original release date
1	1	"A Magic Medicine"	TBD	TBD	1986
2	2	"A Great Decision"	TBD	TBD	1986
3	3	"First Day"	TBD	TBD	1986
4	4	"The Haunting"	TBD	TBD	1986
5	5	"75 Miles from Nowhere"	TBD	TBD	1986
6	6	"The Visitors"	TBD	TBD	1986
7	7	"A Real Lady"	TBD	TBD	1986
8	8	"Treasures of Jean Lafitte"	TBD	TBD	1986
9	9	"Gift Horse"	TBD	TBD	1986
10	10	"Vendetta"	TBD	TBD	1986
11	11	"To Love and Protect"	TBA	TBA	TBA
12	12	"Heaven Sent"	Timothy Bond	Suzette Couture	TBA
13	13	"Rites of Passage"	George Bloomfield	Glenn Norman	TBA
14	14	"Pig at Large"	TBA	TBA	TBA
15	15	"Autumn and Smoke: Part 1"	TBA	TBA	TBA
16	16	"Autumn and Smoke: Part 2"	TBA	TBA	TBA
17	17	"Burning Cures"	TBA	TBA	TBA
18	18	"Harvest Gold"	Joseph L. Scanlan	Suzette Couture	TBA
19	19	"Free and Clear"	George Bloomfield	Peter Such	TBA
20	20	"Declarations of Independence"	TBA	TBA	TBA
21	21	"Child of Fortune"	George Bloomfield	Ken Gass	TBA
22	22	"End of the River"	TBA	TBA	TBA

=== Season 2 ===
No. overall	No. in season	Title	Directed by	Written by	Original release date
23	1	"An Eye for an Eye"	Don Haldane	Michael Mercer	May 29, 1988
24	2	"A Blessing in Disguise"	Unknown	Unknown	June 5, 1988
25	3	"Of Fathers and Sons"	Unknown	Unknown	June 12, 1988
26	4	"The Runaway"	Unknown	Unknown	June 19, 1988
27	5	"Judgement from the Heart"	Unknown	Unknown	June 26, 1988
28	6	"Unwelcomed Suitor"	TBA	TBA	TBA
29	7	"Women's Work"	Unknown	Unknown	July 10, 1988
30	8	"Bingham's Gold"	Unknown	Unknown	July 17, 1988
31	9	"Star Light, Star Bright"	Peter Rowe	Glenn Norman	July 24, 1988
32	10	"Last Time Around"	Don McCutcheon	Paul Aitken & Peter Mitchell	July 31, 1988
33	11	"The Rifle Company"	Unknown	Unknown	August 7, 1988
34	12	"Sins of the Fathers"	TBA	TBA	TBA
35	13	"The Last Performance"	Peter Rowe	M. Charles Cohen	TBA
36	14	"Sweetest Song"	TBA	TBA	TBA
37	15	"Blinded by Love"	TBA	TBA	TBA
38	16	"Desperate Remedy"	TBA	TBA	TBA
39	17	"Dr. Colt of Calcutta"	TBA	TBA	TBA
40	18	"A Matter of Distinction"	Peter Rowe	Glenn Norman	TBA
41	19	"Kith and Kin"	Steve DiMarco	Rob Forsyth	TBA
42	20	"Living Legends"	TBA	TBA	TBA
43	21	"Room at the Inn"	TBA	TBA	TBA
44	22	"The Legacy"	TBA	TBA	TBA
45	23	"Cabin Fever"	TBA	TBA	TBA
46	24	"Miss Quincy"	F. Harvey Frost	Michael Mercer	TBA
47	25	"Rough Justice"	TBA	TBA	TBA
48	26	"The Siege"	TBA	TBA	TBA
49	27	"Mr. Stevenson"	Ken Girotti	Peter Mitchell	TBA
50	28	"Homeward Bound"	TBA	TBA	TBA
51	29	"Lady Helen's Love"	TBA	TBA	TBA
52	30	"The Sentence of the Court"	TBA	TBA	TBA

=== Season 3 ===
No. overall	No. in season	Title	Directed by	Written by	Original release date
53	1	"Partners"	Sturla Gunnarsson	Suzette Couture	TBA
54	2	"Stand and Deliver"	Allan Kroeker	Michael Mercer	TBA
55	3	"Gateway to the World"	Ken Girotti	Scott Barrie	TBA
56	4	"And in the Spring"	TBA	TBA	TBA
57	5	"Dreams Stay with You"	TBA	TBA	TBA
58	6	"Peter Was a Saint"	Timothy Bond	Michael Mercer	TBA
59	7	"Face of a Stranger"	F. Harvey Frost	Bill Gough	TBA
60	8	"When the Bough Breaks"	TBA	TBA	TBA
61	9	"The Eyes of Angels"	TBA	TBA	TBA
62	10	"The Reluctant Candidate"	Don Shebib	Tony Aspler	TBA
63	11	"Something's Rotten"	TBA	TBA	TBA
64	12	"Fortunes of War"	Don Shebib	Paul Ledoux	TBA
65	13	"Partners"	TBA	TBA	TBA
66	14	"Welcome Strangers"	TBA	TBA	TBA
67	15	"The Dragonslayers"	Larry Kent	Suzette Couture	TBA
68	16	"Back to School"	Steve DiMarco	Paul Aitken & Peter Mitchell	TBA
69	17	"A Proposal of Marriage"	Paul Shapiro	Paul Ledoux	TBA
70	18	"The Raid"	TBA	TBA	TBA
71	19	"Partners"	TBA	TBA	TBA
72	20	"Mirrors of the Soul"	TBA	TBA	TBA
73	21	"Partners"	TBA	TBA	TBA
74	22	"A Time for Goodbyes"	Don McCutcheon	Scott Barrie	TBA
75	23	"The Firebrand"	TBA	TBA	TBA
76	24	"Comfort and Joy"	Paul Shapiro	Peter Mitchell & Paul Aitken	TBA
77	25	"Old Ways and New"	TBA	TBA	TBA
78	26	"Truth Will Out"	Jim McCann	Julia Jones	TBA

=== Season 4 ===
No. overall	No. in season	Title	Directed by	Written by	Original release date
79	1	"Becky"	Steve DiMarco	Suzette Couture	TBA
80	2	"See No Evil"	Allan Kroeker	Michael Mercer	TBA
81	3	"The Shiners"	Sturla Gunnarsson	Paul Ledoux	TBA
82	4	"Many Happy Returns"	Carlo Liconti	Story by : Scott Barrie & Catherine Disher & Daphne Ballon; Teleplay by : Scott Barrie	TBA
83	5	"The Sky Is the Limit"	TBA	TBA	TBA
84	6	"A Medal for Valour"	Don McCutcheon	Scott Barrie	TBA
85	7	"The Elusive Mr. Smith"	TBA	TBA	TBA
86	8	"The Hunting Party"	TBA	TBA	TBA
87	9	"Souls of Like Mind"	René Bonnière	Jana Veverka & Tony Robertson	TBA
88	10	"A Man of Means"	Carlo Liconti	Story by : Jeffrey Cohen & Steve Lucas; Teleplay by : Steve Lucas	TBA
89	11	"The Miller's Son"	Don Shebib	Story by : Christine Cornish and Peter Mitchell & Paul Aitken; Teleplay by : Peter Mitchell & Paul Aitken	TBA
90	12	"Down to the Sea"	Don McCutcheon	Rob Forsyth	TBA
91	13	"Duty Bound"	TBA	TBA	TBA
92	14	"Anniversary Waltz"	F. Harvey Frost	Scott Barrie	TBA
93	15	"Disguises"	Otta Hanus	Michael Mercer	TBA
94	16	"The Fine Art of Horsetrading"	TBA	TBA	TBA
95	17	"Boys' Brigade"	Steve DiMarco	Peter Mitchell & Paul Aitken	TBA
96	18	"Ancient Wounds"	Don Shebib	Michael Mercer	TBA
97	19	"From Chimborazo to Canton"	Ken Girotti	Michael Mercer	TBA
98	20	"Flying the Coop"	Steve DiMarco	Paul Ledoux	TBA
99	21	"Bringing Up Thomas"	Malcolm Stoddard	Suzette Couture	TBA
100	22	"Tales of the Canadas"	Steve DiMarco	Susan Snooks & Scott Barrie	TBA

== Media availability ==
In 1996 GoodTimes Entertainment released a two volume VHS set of selected episodes entitled Adventures On the Prairie With The Campbells. On June 23, 2015, Timeless Media Group released The Campbells - The Complete Series on DVD in Region 1.
