= Nightalk =

2022 Canadian film

- Directed by: Donald Shebib
- Written by: Donald Shebib; Claude Harz
- Produced by: Emily Andrews
- Starring: Ashley Bryant; Al Mukadam; Art Hindle
- Cinematography: Gregory Bennett
- Edited by: Donald Shebib
- Music by: Jonathan Goldsmith
- Production companies: Evdon Productions; Filmcoop
- Release date: September 16, 2022 (TIFF)
- Running time: 90 minutes
- Country: Canada
- Language: English

Nightalk is a 2022 Canadian thriller drama film, directed by Donald Shebib. It stars Ashley Bryant as Brenda, a police officer investigating the murder of a young woman; after learning that the woman was active on an online dating application called Nightalk, she joins the application under cover only to be drawn into a relationship with Tom (Al Mukadam), the primary suspect.

The cast also includes Ted Hallett, Art Hindle, Emily Andrews, Rena Polley, Kent Sheridan, Stefano DiMatteo, Martin Doyle, Jim Codrington, William Poulin, Brian Bisson, Jennifer Hui, Eric Fink, Samantha Swan, Lina Yakovlieva, Jen Pogue and Emily Summers.

It is Shebib's first film since Down the Road Again in 2011, and his final film due to his death in 2023. Shebib's son, Noah "40" Shebib, is an executive producer.

The film premiered in the Contemporary World Cinema program at the Toronto International Film Festival on September 16, 2022. The film was released in North America on May 13, 2023 as a Tubi Original.
