= Heartaches (1981 film) =

- Directed by: Donald Shebib
- Written by: Terence Heffernan
- Produced by: David J. Patterson; Jerry Raibourn; Bruce Mallen
- Starring: Margot Kidder; Annie Potts; Robert Carradine; Winston Rekert
- Cinematography: Vic Sarin
- Edited by: Gerry Hambling; Peter Boita
- Music by: Simon Michael Martin
- Distributed by: Motion Picture Marketing (MPM)
- Release date: July 4, 1981
- Running time: 92 minutes
- Country: Canada
- Language: English

Heartaches is a 1981 Canadian comedy film written by Terence Heffernan and directed by Donald Shebib. It stars Margot Kidder, Annie Potts, Winston Rekert and Robert Carradine. The movie is about two young women who form an unlikely friendship on a bus ride to Toronto.

The plot bears similarities to Shebib's best known film, Goin' Down the Road, in which two male partners-in-crime deal with poverty, factory jobs, pregnancy, and moving to a big city.

== Plot ==
Young housewife Bonnie is on a bus to Toronto. She is pregnant, which her husband Stanley, an auto mechanic and aspiring race car driver, is delighted about. However, Stanley is unaware he is not the real father of the baby and that Bonnie is seeking an abortion. On the bus, Bonnie meets Rita, a free-spirited itinerant between jobs. The two women become friends and decide to get an apartment together in Toronto, eventually finding jobs at a mattress factory. Dealing with romance and poverty, they learn that they have more in common than they thought.

Rita sets her romantic sights on Marcello, the factory owner’s nephew. As Bonnie contemplates getting an abortion, Stanley tracks her down and she is forced to admit the truth. Rita’s affair with Marcello ends in betrayal when his fiancée from Italy arrives. Stanley and Bonnie eventually reunite after he comes to terms with Bonnie’s infidelity and agrees to help raise the baby as his own.

== Cast ==
- Margot Kidder as Rita Harris
- Annie Potts as Bonnie Howard
- Robert Carradine as Stanley Howard
- Winston Rekert as Marcello
- Mario DiStasi as George Touliatos
- Guy Sanvido as Aldo
- Arnie Achtman as Alvin
- Peggy Feury as Doctor

== Production ==
Donald Shebib had been planning to make Heartaches since 1976. According to Shebib, “the script was originally based upon a book called 'The Bottle Factory Outing' [by Beryl Bainbridge]...I changed it from a bottle factory to a mattress factory. Eventually the script was so different from the book that we paid [Bainbridge] the rights for the book back. When she did see the film, she loved it.”

The start of filming was delayed several weeks because of an unpaid bond that was required by ACTRA, the Canadian actors' trade union. Filming resumed when movie financing and management company Seven Arts Studios was able to raise the needed funds. Heartaches was shot mostly in Toronto, with one week in Atlanta, Georgia.

== Reception ==
The film was very well-received. The New York Times wrote, "Nothing happens in 'Heartaches' that isn't telegraphed 15 minutes ahead of time, but Miss Kidder and Miss Potts are good fun to watch, not because they convince you of the reality of their characters but because they handle their assignments with such unbridled, comic, actressy enthusiasm.”

Variety said, the "cast is outstanding with Kidder giving full performance. However, it is basically Potts’ film as the runaway wife who’s tired of her husband’s immature attitude.”

== Accolades ==
Heartaches was nominated for eleven Genie Awards, winning for Lead Actress for Margot Kidder, Foreign Actress for Annie Potts, and Original Screenplay for Terence Heffernan.
