= The Fighting Men (1977 film) =

1977 Canadian television film

- Theatrical poster
- Also known as: Men of Steel
- Genre: Action-adventure
- Written by: Tony Sheer
- Directed by: Donald Shebib
- Starring: Allan Royal; Robert Lalonde; David Ferry; Mavor Moore; Yvan Ponton
- Music by: Samuel Matlovsky
- Country of origin: Canada
- Original language: English

Production
- Executive producer: John Trent
- Producer: Dale Falconer
- Cinematography: Laszlo George; Vic Sarin
- Editors: Myrtle Virgo; Ildy Zander
- Running time: 74 minutes
- Production companies: CBC; Via-Tel/TFM Productions
- Budget: C$400,000

Original release
- Network: CBC Television
- Release: 24 September 1977

The Fighting Men is a 1977 Canadian survival television film directed by Donald Shebib, produced by John Trent, and written by Tony Sheer, later released in theatres (retitled Men of Steel).

== Synopsis ==
Wayne Archer (Allan Royal) and Jean-Claude Archambeault (Robert Lalonde) are two military officers from Canada's "two solitudes," an Anglophone and a Francophone. A barracks room fight breaks out between the two young servicemen over whether to watch Kojak or the elections in Quebec. Shortly thereafter, they are assigned together to a remote northern radio outpost north of Goose Bay, Labrador, for three months, much to their mutual displeasure.

En route, their plane crashes in a severe snow storm, killing the pilot. Archer saves Archambeault from certain death by dragging him out of the aircraft at the cost of severe burns to his hands, while both of Archambeault's legs are broken. Forced by circumstance and personal injury to make the best of a bad situation, the "dumb Anglo" and the "stupid Pepsi", as they had called each other, work together to survive in the frozen wilderness and develop a grudging mutual respect as they leave aside their differences and bitter prejudices.

== Cast ==
Main

- Allan Royal • Wayne Archer
- Robert Lalonde • Jean-Claude Archambault
- David Ferry • Merrigan
- Mavor Moore • Colonel Munro
- Yvan Ponton • Laberge

Supporting

- Michael J. Reynolds • Major Burns
- Henry Beckman • Coxswain
- Sara Botsford • Maggie
- Anne Dandurand • Nicole
- R.D. Reid • Jakes
- Charles Foster • Comm. Daniel Arnold
- Richard Blackburn • Lt. Morrissey
- Peter Jobin • Leclerc
- Deborah Templeton • Waitress
- Chick Roberts • CPO Mason
- Mac Bradden • Bury

== Themes ==
The Fighting Men is, according to Frank Daiey, pursuing Margaret Atwood's "survival theme" in Canadian arts. It also explores the Canadian problem of how individual French and English Canadians relate to each other.

== Production ==
=== Background and writing ===
The Fighting Men was made to be shown as part of a weekly programme of Canadian and international films which aired on Saturday Night Movies, on a budget of $400,000. Tony Sheer's story was titled Men of Steel.

=== Filming ===
Principal photography took place in Toronto and in the Vivian Forest from 14 February to 11 March 1977.

== Release and reception ==
The Fighting Men was first broadcast on 24 September 1977 on CBC Television. A longer, 35 mm film version (91 minutes) was released in theatres under the title Men of Steel in 1988.

=== Home media ===
As Men of Steel, the film was made available on VHS on 15 September 1988 (91 min., Trans World Entertainment).

=== Critical response ===
Frank Daiey said that while The Fighting Men was "a good shot", it was not good enough, commending Shebib's direction, particularly the realistic set up of the military base. While he found Allan Royal's acting superficial, Robert Lalonde was far more believable, despite the fact that Archambeault comes across as "quite dumb" during the encounter with wolves, and leaving the transmitter on through the storm: "this guy was supposed to be a radioman... Errors like this undermine the credibility of a melodrama." Daiey finds more holes in the plot, as well as unbelievable and sentimental moments "phoney" enough to make an audience wince: "this kind of dramatic manipulation, not related to what is actually going on reveals a satisfaction with what is hoped will be dramatic plotting and instead of thinking more and coming up with incidents that actually convince us."

Contrastingly, Keith Ashford found both the film's leads came up with "strong performances" and praised the special effects and make up for the crash and exposure scenes, the film "ploughing through to a happy ending with power to spare." However, the film's premise simplistic, as though "all that's needed to unite the two solitudes in loving harmony is a common catastrophe", thereby "reducing that notion to the level of personal conflict":

The Fighting Men fleshes out the dual conflicts of man against man and man against nature with an unseemly degree of melodrama... The net result is too much clutter, too many hangnail relationships and too many supporting characters in a drama built for two.

George Pratley described the film as a well-made, "familiar service story made fresh and interesting by taking place in the Canadian armed forces."

VideoHound's Golden Movie Retriever gives the theatrical version a single star.
