= George Bloomfield (director) =

Canadian television and film director (1929–2011)

- Born: December 2, 1929; Montreal, Quebec, Canada
- Died: May 13, 2011 (aged 81); Toronto, Ontario, Canada
- Occupations: Television and film director and producer
- Known for: SCTV; Fraggle Rock; Due South
- Spouses: Barbara Amiel (1965–1971, div.); Louisa "Jane" Veralta
- Relatives: Maury Chaykin (nephew); Daccia Bloomfield (daughter)

George Norman Bloomfield (December 2, 1929 – May 13, 2011) was a Canadian director, producer and actor in film and television, mostly in Canada. He was the director of the sketch comedy television series Second City Television (SCTV) from 1977 to 1979, the comedy series Fraggle Rock from 1983 to 1987, and the comedy series Due South from 1994 to 1999. He directed feature films, beginning with Jenny in 1970. He directed several television feature films, such as Riel. He also was a stage director, such as the premiere of The Ecstasy of Rita Joe in 1967.

== Personal life ==
Bloomfield was born in Montreal, Quebec, Canada in 1929, the youngest of four children in a Jewish family. His father Charles Bloomfield dressed the windows of The Seagram Company. His mother Bessie was a pianist who accompanied silent films and played for opera singers. He had two sisters, Clarice and Joy, and a brother Sunny. Clarice had a son, Maury who became an actor on the recommendation of George.

He attended McGill University, where he joined the college review and the player's club. He wrote a play at college and ended up directing it himself "because nobody else could understand it". He graduated and entered law school. He left law school after one year and he went to work at the National Film Board. He was fired after three years and he spent the next year in England following actors to learn their craft. He returned to law school for second-year law but quit law for good after three weeks.

Bloomfield was married twice. His first wife was journalist Barbara Amiel, ending in divorce in 1971. He married Louisa Veralta in 1977 and they stayed married for the rest of Bloomfield's life. Louisa and George had a daughter Daccia Bloomfield, who is an actor and author.

Bloomfield died of complications from surgery after a heart attack in Toronto, Ontario, Canada in 2011 at the age of 81. He had suffered from heart disease, diabetes, cancer and kidney disease for over 30 years and recovered several times, including two previous heart attacks.

== Career ==
Bloomfield was considered a pioneer in Canadian film and television. He was considered an "actor's director", attributing this to his acting experience. For much of his career, Bloomfield would also act in his projects, usually in uncredited or small roles.

Bloomfield started out on the stage. In 1956, he was in the cast of Three Rings for Michelle, at the Avenue Theatre. In 1958, he was a co-star in The Rainmaker with Sylvia Gillespie at the La Poudriere theatre in Montreal.

Also in the 1950s, he worked on films for the National Film Board of Canada (NFB) as an assistant director. After being fired from the NFB, he helped found a stage production company in Montreal. In 1960, he helped found the National Theatre School of Canada, where he was one of its first teachers.

He moved to Toronto in 1962 to direct the play Red Eye of Love at the Village Playhouse. In the theatre audience was Robert Alan, head of drama at the Canadian Broadcasting Corporation (CBC). Alan invited Bloomfield to do a dry run of a production. Bloomfield produced 20 minutes of Death of a Salesman and was hired on contract. This led to directing television drama and comedies, starting with six episodes of stage adaptations for the "Festival" anthology series. He would go on to work on CBC projects for most of his professional career.

Bloomfield did not completely leave stage direction behind. Bloomfield directed the premiere of the stage play The Ecstasy of Rita Joe at the Vancouver Playhouse in 1967. This was a very political and timely play about indigenous issues, written by George Ryga, whom Bloomfield befriended.

Bloomfield then left Canada, moving to New York where he worked in movie direction. Bloomfield's first movie in the States was Jenny with Alan Alda and Marlo Thomas. A financial success, he moved on to the horror/drama To Kill a Clown again with Alda, in 1972. Bloomfield had a confrontation with the movie's producer Ed Scherick over the anti-war theme of the movie. Scherick produced alternate script pages, dangling the possibility of directing the movie Sleuth. However, Bloomfield was offended, rejected the changes and punched Scherick and lost the Sleuth directing assignment. As well, after filming was complete, the ending was cut and replaced against Bloomfield's wishes.

Bloomfield, disillusioned with the US, returned to Canada and resumed his television career. He directed several TV movies, including The Rimshots, Nellie McClung, Love on the Nose, Hedda Gabler and Paradise Lost, based on the 1935 play. Paradise Lost, made to coincide with the US Bicentennial, was chosen by Bloomfield as an alternative to the TV specials highlighting success stories of the US. "I thought it would be nice to provide our audience - which is going to be bathed in heroes this year - with what it was really like."

Beginning in 1977, he directed 39 episodes of Second City Television sketch comedy series, better known as SCTV, which became widely successful. Several of the actors in SCTV would make appearances in small parts in his two movies in 1980, including John Candy, Joe Flaherty, Eugene Levy and Catherine O'Hara, some making their film debuts. Two sequel series, SCTV Network and SCTV Channel with many of the same actors were produced from 1981 to 1984, Bloomfield directing the latter.

In 1979, Bloomfield directed the controversial Riel television movie for the CBC, about Louis Riel and the Red River and North-West Rebellions in western Canada. As the movie was based on historical events, and the actors were portraying real-life characters, he had each actor research the history of their characters, and adapt the script to match what they learned. Bloomfield himself stated that he learned a lot about the distinctive Métis culture.

Bloomfield returned to stage direction in 1982, directing Talley's Folly at the St. Lawrence Centre for the Arts in Toronto. He also directed Memoir about Sandra Bernhardt at Toronto Free Theatre, and a revival of The Ecstasy of Rita Joe at the St. Lawrence Centre.

Bloomfield was a prolific director of television series and films in the 1980s, 1990s and early 2000s. He was the primary director of several series, including Fraggle Rock and Due South. He directed episodes of several Canadian series, including Street Legal, North of 60, La Femme Nikita, The Campbells, and The Jane Show.

== Filmography ==
Source: IMDB unless otherwise referenced.

Feature Movies
Year	Name		Role
1959	Threshold: The Immigrant Meets the School	NFB	director
1966	Henry V	TV	director
1970	Jenny		director
1972	To Kill a Clown		director
1974	Child Under a Leaf		director
1976	Paradise Lost	TV	director
1976	The Rimshots	TV	director
1978	Hedda Gabler	TV	director
1978	Nelly McClung	TV	director
1978	Love on the Nose	TV	director
1979	Riel	TV	director
1980	Nothing Personal		director
1980	Double Negative		director
1989	St Nicholas and the Children		director
1990	African Journey	TV	director
1990	African Journey 2	TV	director
1992	The Argon Quest		director
1992	Wojeck: Out of the Fire	TV	director
1994	TekWar: TekLords	TV	director
1995	The Awakening	TV	director
1999	Jacob Two Two Meets the Hooded Fang		director
2000	Deadly Appearances	TV	director
2000	Love and Murder	TV	director

Television
Year	Name	Type	Role
1956	Guest Stage	series	director, 1 episode "Etc."
1958	Midsummer Theatre	series	actor, 1 episode "The Equalizer"
1959	Frontiers	series	director, 1 episode
1964	Quest	series	director, 1 episode
1965	The Serial	series	director, 4 episodes
1964–1967	Festival	series	director, 6 episodes actor, 1 episode "Heloise and Abelard"
1967	The Way It Is	series	director, 1 episode "Carpenter by Trade"
1975–1976	Performance	series	director, 2 episodes "The Good and Faithful Servant" and "Portrait of a Mask"
1976	Peep Show	series	executive producer
1977	Custard Pie	series	director, 13 episodes
1977	The King of Kensington	series	director, 1 episode
1977–1979	SCTV	series	director, 39 episodes
1978	Sidestreet	series	director, 1 episode
1983–1984	SCTV Channel	series	director
1983–1987	Fraggle Rock	series	director, 29 episodes
1986	Sharon, Lois & Bram's Elephant Show	series	director, 3 episodes
1986–1988	The Campbells	series	director, 12 episodes
1987	Adderly	series	director, 1 episode
1988–1989	Blizzard Island	series	director, 6 episodes
1988–1989	War of the Worlds	series	director, 6 episodes
1989	Friday the 13th: TV Series	series	director, 1 episode
1989–1991	My Secret Identity	series	director, 4 episodes
1990–1991	Street Legal	series	director, 6 episodes
1990–1992	Neon Rider	series	director, 6 episodes
1990–1993	E. N. G.	series	director, 11 episodes
1991	Max Glick	series	director, 1 episode
1992	Road to Avonlea	series	director, 2 episodes
1993	North of 60	series	director, 3 episodes
1994–1999	Due South	series	director, 24 episodes
1994	Lonesome Dove: The Series	mini-series	director, 1 episode
1995	Tekwar	series	director, 1 episode
1995	Hawkeye	series	director, 1 episode
1995	Kung Fu: The Legend Continues	series	director, 1 episode
1997	The Outer Limits	series	director, 1 episode
1997	La Femme Nikita	series	director, 3 episodes
1998–2000	Emily of New Moon	series	director, 3 episodes
1999–2000	Beggars and Choosers	series	director, 2 episodes
2001	Doc	series	director, 4 episodes
2001–2002	The Associates	series	director
2002	Tracker	series	director, 1 episode
2002	A Nero Wolfe Mystery	series	director, 2 episodes
2004	Wild Card	series	director, 1 episode
2006–2007	The Jane Show	series	director, 8 episodes
