= John Wildman (actor) =

Canadian actor

- Born: 7 November 1960 (age 65); Montreal, Quebec, Canada
- Occupation: Actor
- Years active: 1970-present

John Wildman (born November 7, 1960) is a Canadian television and film actor. His parents divorced when he was a child and his mother, a model and actress, moved often to find work. Wildman attended fourteen schools in thirteen years.

== Career ==
Wildman began his career as a child actor, performing his first film role in The Huntsman when he was nine. He studied acting at the Dome Theatre in Montreal, and had parts in eight shows over a three year period.

He is best known for his role as Butch in the 1985 film My American Cousin, for which he won a Genie Award. He played the same character in the 1989 sequel American Boyfriends. Beginning in 1986 Wildman played Neil Campbell on the television series The Campbells.
