= 25th Canadian Film Awards =

Canadian film awards ceremony

- Date: October 12, 1973
- Location: Chevalier Theatre, Montreal

Highlights
- Most awards: Kamouraska; The Sloane Affair
- Best Motion Picture: Slipstream

The 25th Canadian Film Awards were announced on October 12, 1973, to honour achievements in Canadian film.

== Quebec boycott ==
The awards were marred by controversy, when 14 Quebec film directors signed an open letter announcing a boycott of the awards over their handling of Quebec films. The signatories were Gilles Carle, Denis Héroux, Claude Jutra, Marcel Carrière, Denys Arcand, Clément Perron, André Melançon, Jacques Gagné, Gilles Therien, René Avon, André Bélanger, Jean Saulnier, Roger Frappier and Aimée Danis. They expressed the view that English Canadian and French Canadian film were two different domains which could not be directly compared against each other in the same categories but instead needed to each have their own selection criteria and even their own separate awards, and criticized the funding processes of organizations such as the Canadian Film Development Corporation, the National Film Board of Canada and the Canadian Broadcasting Corporation. The directors chose to protest even though the awards had been scheduled to be presented, as a bi-cultural event, in Montreal.

Although the directors stated that they intended their letter as a "quiet" gesture, it had an explosive impact; the Canadian Film Award gala scheduled for October 12 was cancelled. An awards luncheon for sponsored and educational films went ahead, but winners in other categories were announced at a press conference, and the awards were entirely cancelled in 1974, with the 26th Canadian Film Awards not taking place until 1975.

Despite the boycott, several of the boycotting directors' films were named as winners, although Carle's win of the Wendy Michener Award, for "outstanding contribution to the Canadian Film Awards and the Canadian film industry", was booed in the theatre. But English-language filmmakers felt betrayed and angry, and producers and film distributors from Quebec, dissociated themselves from the directors' move.

== Best Picture controversy ==
The awards faced further controversy when Slipstream was announced as the winner of the award for Best Feature Film. The film's Best Feature Film win, over Kamouraska, Réjeanne Padovani, Paperback Hero and Between Friends, was widely derided by critics. The Globe and Mail film critic Betty Lee acknowledged that the film showed some promise on Acomba's part, but concluded that it "sags embarrassingly under its weight of honors". In its December 1973 year in review, the paper named it as the worst film of the year and singled out the Canadian Film Awards for a special "Grand Prix for General All-Around Stupidity", both for choosing Slipstream as Best Picture over four much stronger nominees and for giving the Michener Award to Carle. Its victory was later cited as an indication that the boycotting directors had been correct in their beliefs that the Canadian Film Awards had a systemic bias against Quebec films.

== Winners ==
=== Films ===
- Film of the Year: Not awarded
- Feature Film: Slipstream — Pacific Rim Films, James Margellos producer, David Acomba director
- Theatrical Documentary: Coming Home — National Film Board of Canada, Tom Daly and Colin Low producers, Bill Reid director
- Documentary: Grierson — National Film Board of Canada, Roger Blais producer and director, and

Faire hurler les murs — Office du film du Québec, Jean Saulnier director

- Theatrical Short: Goodbye Sousa — National Film Board of Canada, George Pearson producer, Tony Ianzelo director
- Animated: The Family That Dwelt Apart — National Film Board of Canada, Wolf Koenig producer, Yvon Mallette director
- TV Drama: The Sloane Affair — National Film Board of Canada, Douglas Jackson producer and director
- TV Information: The Ungrateful Land: Roch Carrier Remembers Ste-Justine — National Film Board of Canada, Ian McLaren producer, Cynthia Scott director
- Nature and Wildlife: Return of the Giants — Keg Productions, Ralph Ellis and Gerald S. Kedley producers
- Travel and Recreation: Island Eden — Government of British Columbia Department of Travel, Norman Keziere director, and

Ski Alberta — Ranson Photographers, C. N. Ross producer

- Public Relations: We Are Running Out of Time — Simon Fraser University, Jan Turek director
- Sales Promotion: Way of Wood — Canawest Film Productions, Roy E. Burns producer
- Training and Instruction: Moccasin Flats — Immedia Inc., Patrick Watson producer, and

The Trial of Polly Upgate — Gertrude McCance, Don S. Williams producers, Don S. Williams director

=== Feature Film Craft Awards ===
- Performance by a Lead Actor: Jacques Godin - O.K. ... Laliberté (NFB)
- Performance by a Lead Actress: Geneviève Bujold - Kamouraska (France Cinéma Productions/CFDC et al)
- Supporting Actor: Willie Lamothe - The Death of a Lumberjack (La mort d'un bûcheron) (Les Productions Carl-Lamy/Famous Players)
- Supporting Actress: Camille Bernard - Kamouraska (France Cinéma Productions)
- Art Direction: François Barbeau - Kamouraska (France Cinéma Productions)
- Cinematography: Donald Wilder - Paperback Hero (Agincourt Productions)
- Director: David Acomba - Slipstream (Pacific Rim Films)
- Film Editing: Kirk Jones - Paperback Hero (Agincourt Productions)
- Sound Editing: Alan Lloyd - Slipstream (Pacific Rim Films)
- Music Score: Willie Lamothe, Tristan Hansinger, Chick Peabody and Peter Van Ginkel - La mort d'un bûcheron (The Death of a Lumberjack (CFDC)
- Screenplay: Jacques Benoît and Denys Arcand - Réjeanne Padovani (Cinak)
- Overall Sound: Jean Rival - Unfinished Infonie (L'Infonie inachevée...) (Faroun Films), and

Joe Grimaldi - Paperback Hero (Agincourt Productions)

=== Non-Feature Craft Awards ===
- Performance by a Lead Actor: Marcel Sabourin - Weapons and Men (Des armes et les hommes) (NFB)
- Performance by a Lead Actress: Jackie Burroughs - Vicky (CBC)
- Art Direction: Denis Boucher - The Sloane Affair (NFB)
- Cinematography: Paul Vézina and Paul Maltais - Faire hurler les murs (Office du film du Québec), and

Pierre Letarte - The Ungrateful Land: Roch Carrier Remembers Ste-Justine (NFB)

- Direction: Douglas Jackson - The Sloane Affair (NFB), and

Arthur Lamothe - A bon pied, bon œil

- Film Editing: Claude Lavoie - Faire hurler les murs (Office du film du Québec), and

Danielle Gagné - A bon pied bon œil

- Sound Editing: Arla Saare - The Shield (KIAAS)
- Music Score: Les Stein - Faire hurler les murs (Office du film du Québec), and

Herbert Helbig - To War and Back

- Screenplay: Douglas Jackson and Alvin Goldman - The Sloane Affair (NFB)
- Non-Dramatic Script: André Melançon - Weapons and Men (Des armes et les hommes) (NFB), and

Keith Harley - The Winning of Nickel (Westminster Films), and
Pen Densham, J. Fisher and John Watson - Streetworker

- Sound Recording: Richard Besse and Jacques Chévigny - Station 10 (NFB), and

Karen Foster and Clarke Da Prato - Are You Listening (You Out There?)

- Sound Re-Recording: Michel Descombes - Le vent (NFB)

== Special awards ==
- Special Achievement: Claude Jutra - Kamouraska, and

Cameron Graham - To War and Back

- Certificate of Merit: Gilles Thérien - Ratopolis (NFB)
- Grierson Award: Robert Forget, for outstanding contributions to Canadian cinema.
- Wendy Michener Award: Gilles Carle, for outstanding contribution to the Canadian Film Awards and the Canadian film industry.
