= 1937 in radio =

The year 1937 saw a number of significant events in radio broadcasting history.

== Events ==
- 9 January – Nature magazine takes up physicist S. K. Mitra's campaign to persuade the Government of India to establish a Radio Research Board.
- 1 February – First broadcast of the continuing Swedish radio programme Dagens dikt ("Poem of the day").
- 9 March – Fireside chat by the President of the United States: On the Reorganization of the Judiciary.
- 14 March – The Jack Benny - Fred Allen 12-year "feud" begins, when both comedians participate in "The Battle of the Century" at the Hotel Pierre.
- 6 May – The Hindenburg disaster takes place in Lakehurst, New Jersey. Herbert Morrison is assigned by NBC Red affiliate WLS (AM) in Chicago to cover the landing of the zeppelin; as he has no ability to broadcast the event live, he and his engineer decide to record it as an experiment. The ensuing transcription (including the now-famous "Oh, the humanity" idiom) airs from Chicago that evening and on the NBC Red Network the next day, a first for the network given that NBC's policy at the time forbade the use of prerecorded news actualities.
- 12 May – Coronation of King George VI and Queen Elizabeth at Westminster Abbey in London. The BBC makes its first outside broadcast covering the event.
- 4 July – Following the alteration of frequencies at the BBC's Washford transmitter to enable it to radiate separate regional services for Wales and the West of England, a new Welsh Regional Programme begins, broadcast from Washford on 1050 kHz and Penmon on 804 kHz.
- 13 July – Schools in France are sent a list of state-approved radio receivers from which they can choose in order to obtain a government subsidy of 400 francs on the purchase.
- 8 September – CBS broadcasts a two-and-a-half hour memorial concert in the US in memory of George Gershwin, live from the Hollywood Bowl. It features such stars as Oscar Levant, Fred Astaire, Otto Klemperer, Lily Pons and the Los Angeles Philharmonic.
- 14 September – Britain's Foreign Secretary, Anthony Eden, broadcasts from Geneva following the Nyon Conference.
- 1 October – First Dagens Eko news broadcast on Swedish radio.
- 12 October – Fireside chat: On Legislation to be Recommended to the Extraordinary Session of the Congress.
- 14 November – Fireside chat: On the Unemployment Census.
- 12 December – American actress Mae West makes a risqué guest appearance on The Chase and Sanborn Hour that eventually results in her being banned from radio.
- Undated – In the United States:
  - Frederic Ziv and John L. Sinn form the Ziv Company for syndication of radio programs.
  - The Oklahoma Network Inc. begins operation with eight stations in Oklahoma as initial members.

== Debuts ==
- 6 January – Broadway Merry-Go-Round debuts on the Blue Network.
- 18 January – Aunt Jenny's Real Life Stories (1937–1956) debuts on CBS.
- 24 January - Good Will Hour (1937-1953) debuts on WMCA before moving to Mutual on August 1, 1937.
- 25 January – The Guiding Light (1937–1952) debuts on NBC Red. In June 1952, this series will spawn a television version of the same name.
- 29 March – Our Gal Sunday (1937–1959) debuts on CBS.
- 5 July – Arnold Grimm's Daughter debuts on CBS.
- 12 July – Laugh and Grow Fit, presented by Joe Murgatroyd, broadcast by Radio Normandy.
- 10 September - The Song Shop debuts on CBS.
- 26 September – The Shadow debuts in the United States.
- 11 October – The Court of Missing Heirs debuts on CBS.
- 19 October – Big Town debuts on CBS.
- 1 November – Brave New World debuts on CBS.
- 1 November – Hilltop House debuts on CBS.
- 4 November – Good News of 1938 debuts on NBC.
- 5 November – Black Night (horror program) debuts on WBAP.
- 7 November – Dr. Christian debuts on CBS.
- UNDATED
  - The American Scene debuts in syndication.
  - The Fascination of Brechfa, presented by G. Arbour Stevens (BBC)

== Endings ==
- 18 April – The Adventures of Captain Diamond ends its run on network radio.
- 26 April – Bughouse Rhythm ends its run on network radio (Blue Network).
- 25 June – Ma and Pa ends its run on network radio (CBS).
- 28 July – Broadway Merry-Go-Round ends its run on network radio (Blue Network).
- 30 July – Broadway Varieties ends its run on network radio (CBS).

== Births ==
- 16 February – Peter Hobday (died 2020), English broadcast news presenter.
- 13 May – Trevor Baylis (died 2018), English inventor of the windup radio.
- 20 July – Michael Oliver (died 2002), English radio arts presenter.
- 9 November – Roger McGough, English poet and radio presenter.
- 11 December – Stephen Moore (died 2019), English actor (The Hitchhiker's Guide to the Galaxy).
- 17 December – Brian Hayes (died 2025), Australian-born radio phone-in presenter.
- 18 December – Frankie Crocker (died 2000), famous New York City radio disc jockey.

== Deaths ==
- 25 March – John Drinkwater, English poet and playwright, 54
- 20 July – Guglielmo Marconi, Italian physicist and wireless telegraphy pioneer, 63
- 23 November – Jagadish Chandra Bose, Indian scientist, pioneer in radio wave technology, 78
- 29 December – Don Marquis, American writer and broadcaster, 59
