= Slipstream (1973 film) =

- Directed by: David Acomba
- Written by: William Fruet
- Produced by: James Margellos
- Starring: Luke Askew; Patti Oatman; Eli Rill; Scott Hylands
- Cinematography: Marc Champion
- Edited by: Tony Lower
- Distributed by: Pacific Rim; Cinepix Film Properties
- Release date: 1973
- Running time: 93 min
- Country: Canada
- Language: English

Slipstream is a Canadian drama film, released in 1973. Directed by David Acomba and written by William Fruet, it won the Canadian Film Award for Best Feature Film at the 25th Canadian Film Awards in 1973.

== Synopsis ==
The film stars Luke Askew as Mike Mallard, a popular but reclusive radio DJ who broadcasts his show from an isolated barn in the wilderness. After he is discovered by four young people, he begins to get romantically involved with one of them, Kathy (Patti Oatman), while simultaneously battling with Alec (Eli Rill), his producer who wants him to play more contemporary pop hits.

The film's soundtrack includes music by Van Morrison, Eric Clapton, and Townes Van Zandt.

== Critical reception ==
The film's Best Feature Film win, over Kamouraska, Réjeanne Padovani, Paperback Hero and Between Friends, was widely derided by critics. The Globe and Mail film critic Betty Lee acknowledged that the film showed some promise on Acomba's part, but concluded that it "sags embarrasingly under its weight of honors". In its December 1973 year in review, the paper named it as the worst film of the year, and singled out the Canadian Film Award jury for a special "Grand Prix for General All-Around Stupidity" for choosing it over four much stronger nominees. Writing for Cinema Canada, journalist A. Ibrányi-Kiss opined that the film would have been an eminently deserving winner of an award for best first feature or most promising newcomer, but agreed that it was nowhere near the best Canadian film of the year.

Its victory was also later cited as an indication that the Quebec film directors who had boycotted the 1973 awards out of a perception that the event had a systemic bias against Quebec filmmakers, prompting the 1973 awards to be announced only by press conference and the subsequent 1974 awards to be cancelled entirely, had been correct in their beliefs.
