= Kamouraska =

Kamouraska may refer to:

- Kamouraska Regional County Municipality, Quebec
- Kamouraska, Quebec, a municipality
- Kamouraska (novel), a novel by Anne Hébert
- Kamouraska (film), a film by Claude Jutra, based on the novel
- Kamouraska (federal electoral district), a former federal electoral district in the Canadian province of Quebec
- Kamouraska (provincial electoral district), a former provincial electoral district in Quebec
