= Paperback Hero =

Paperback Hero may refer to:

- Paperback Hero (1973 film), a 1973 Canadian film
- Paperback Hero (1999 film), a 1999 Australian film
- "Paperback Hero!", a 1988 episode of The Raccoons
