= Margaret Sangster (radio writer) =

American writer (1894–1981)

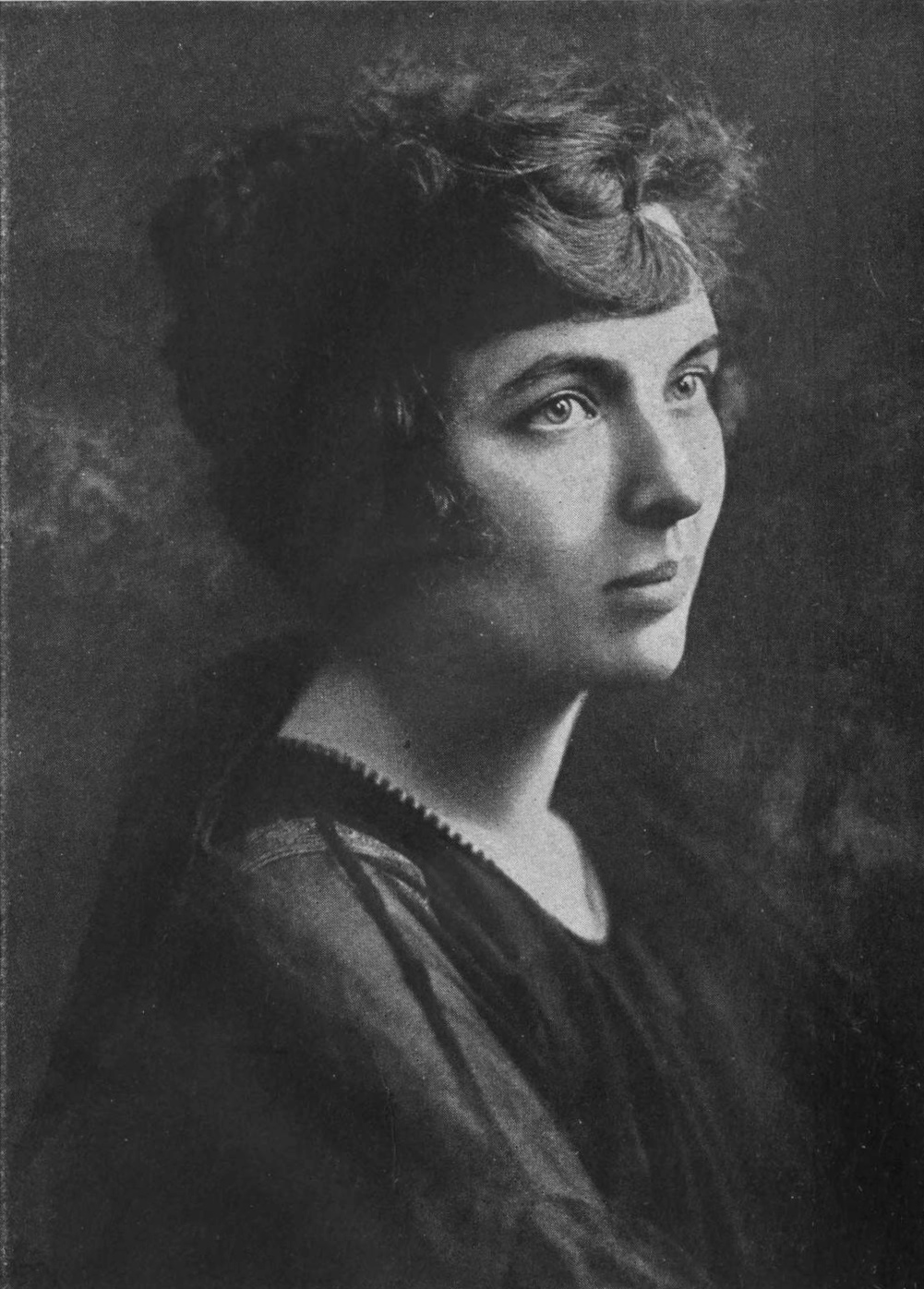
Image of Margaret E. Sangster

Margaret Sangster (1894 - October 23, 1981) was an American writer who primarily produced scripts for radio programs.

== Early years ==
Sangster was the daughter of Mr. and Mrs. George Manson Sangster. She grew up in Brooklyn, New York, living there until she was 20 years old. Her mother was an invalid, which limited Sangster's activity as a child. When she ventured beyond the front stoop of their home, her mother tapped sharply on her upstairs window with a thimble, beckoning her back to the stoop. "On occasion," she recalled in 1934, "I was permitted to sit on a hassock while tea was served, but I wasn't permitted to talk. I really was a model child. It was very uninteresting." Her father was a newspaperman in New York, and her grandmother was Margaret Elizabeth Sangster, a writer and editor. Her grandmother became blind, and the younger Margaret spent several hours a day reading to her.

Sangster's childhood shaped her outlook as a professional writer, causing her to say, "I never have written a story that I thought was really good. I think it's partly because I was brought up in a family in which any man was so much more important than the most important women, and I developed a profound sense of my shortcomings."

== Career ==
Sangster's career began at age 16 when she sold poems to the religious periodical the Christian Herald and began to work for that publication. She spent three months in 1918-1919 as a war correspondent for the Christian Herald in Belgium, France, and Germany. Her travel in Germany took her to "the farthest outpost visited by any American woman up to that time." After several years there, she became editor of Photoplay magazine, and after that she edited The Smart Set magazine. Although she left the Christian Herald to pursue other career options, she continued to write a monthly column for that magazine for nearly a half-century.

Leaving salaried opportunities behind, Sangster began to freelance in 1930, forming her own company with an office about two blocks from her home. Depositing her earnings into the company and allocating a salary for herself enabled her to avoid the "feast or famine" situation that she had observed in other freelance writers. She also followed a regular schedule, working five days a week in her office.

Sangster's first project on radio was writing scripts for Hope Alden's Romance. Other radio programs for which she wrote included Ellen Randolph, Arnold Grimm's Daughter, Dick and Jeannie, House on Q Street, Joyce Jordan, M.D., My True Story, The Story of Ellen Randolph, Whispering Streets, and Living Dramas of the Bible. TV Radio Mirror said, in a 1937 article about Sangster, "Actors and audience have always sensed the wit and wisdom, the love of people and of life that flow into each script."

Sangster also wrote the TV version of My True Story.

Sangster wrote articles, poems, and short stories for magazines and newspaper. Some of those items were printed with her own byline, and some used pen names.

=== Approach to writing ===
Sangster described her writing for soap operas as "corny", which she clarified by saying, "Everything that happens every day is a corny thing. And as for cliches, which are so looked-down-on by the so-called sophisticates, I am all for them. I think they're honest. I think that in hours of great extremity, people turn quite simple in their language". She sometimes wrote for four soap operas concurrently, and she could complete a script for a 30-minute episode in 90 minutes. She was constantly looking for ideas for plots. During one taxi ride the driver asked where she found her ideas. She replied, "I've gotten three from you in the last five minutes." As she observed people she imagined things that might happen to those individuals and developed stories from those thoughts.

== Personal life and death ==
Sangster married Carroll McCoy Sheridan at her parents' Brooklyn home on June 26, 1920. She also was married to Gerrit Van Deth, an accountant. She died on October 23, 1981, in the Barnwell Health Center in Valatie, New York. Her funeral was at St. Paul's Episcopal Church in Kinderhook, New York.

== Papers and recognition ==
Sangster's papers are housed in the Margaret E. Sangster Jr. Collection at Brooklyn College. Material there contains a limited amount of information about her personal life. Most of the collection consists of scripts that she wrote for soap operas. Other contents include her poems, short stories, and material related to proposed programs.

My True Story, which was written by Sangster, won the Radio Television Mirror Award for favorite radio daytime program (non-serial) for 1950. In 1958, the American Cancer Society honored the program for educating the public about cancer.
