= Coming Home (1973 film) =

1973 film by Bill Reid

- Directed by: Bill Reid
- Produced by: Tom Daly; Colin Low
- Cinematography: Barry Perles
- Edited by: David Wilson
- Production company: National Film Board of Canada
- Release date: June 30, 1973
- Running time: 85 minutes
- Country: Canada
- Language: English

Coming Home is a Canadian documentary film, directed by Bill Reid and released in 1973. Made for the National Film Board of Canada, the film documents Reid's own trip home to visit his parents in Sarnia, Ontario, and the family's conversations about the communication difficulties and generational differences in values that have complicated their familial relationship.

The film won the Canadian Film Award for Best Theatrical Documentary at the 25th Canadian Film Awards.
