= Lonely Women =

1942-1943 radio soap opera

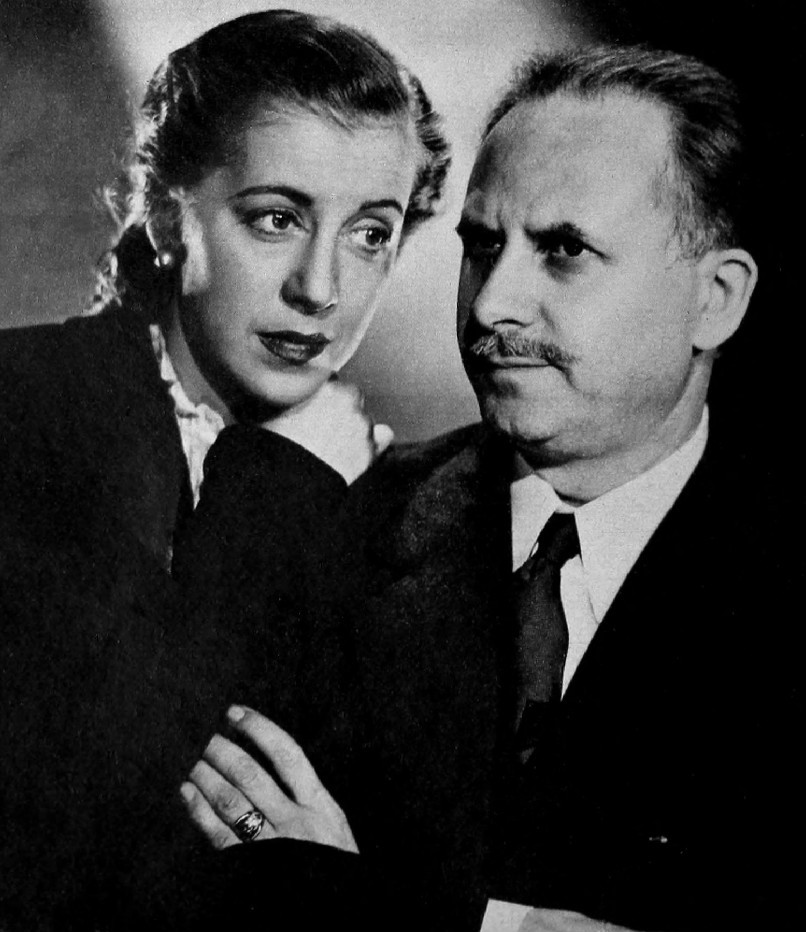
- Muriel Bremner and Herb Butterfield in Lonely Women (1943)
- Genre: Soap Opera
- Running time: 15 minutes
- Country of origin: United States
- Language(s): English
- Syndicates: NBC
- Starring: Betty Lou Gerson; Barbara Luddy
- Announcer: Marvin Miller
- Created by: Irna Phillips
- Written by: Irna Phillips
- Original release: June 29, 1942 – 1943
- Sponsored by: General Mills

Lonely Women is a radio soap opera that was broadcast in the United States during World War II. It "told of women separated from their men by war." The 15-minute program, which was sponsored by General Mills, ran one season on NBC, with its first episode broadcast June 29, 1942.

== Creator ==
Lonely Women was conceived and written by Irna Phillips, a prolific producer of radio soap operas. Her entry on the Jewish Women's Archive website notes her contributions to the genre as follows:

Working with a full-time secretary and staff of writers and researchers, Phillips produced five daytime serials during the early 1940s. Among her most popular radio soap operas were The Guiding Light, Woman in White, The Right to Happiness, Lonely Women, and The ‘New’ Today’s Children. Known for her trademark cliff-hangers, the use of organ music to create moods, and the “crossover” (when characters from one show appeared on another), she was among the first scriptwriters to utilize the amnesia victim and the murder trial. Shunning sensationalism, Phillips preferred to focus on real-life families as they coped with such socially significant issues as juvenile delinquency during World War II, the adjustments of returning war veterans, adultery, adoption, and divorce. In contrast with other radio soap operas, which typically endorsed traditional visions of domesticity and femininity, Phillips’s serials frequently conveyed the complexities of modern women’s choices.

== Cast ==
The show's main characters were Fifth Avenue model Marilyn Larimore (played by Betty Lou Gerson) and lovesick secretary Judith Clark (played by Barbara Luddy). Although the cast was originally all-female, men were added later. Additional characters and the actor or actress who played the part were as follows:

Character	Actor/Actress
Mrs. Schultz	Virginia Payne
Nora	Nanette Sargent
Judith Evans	Eileen Palmer
Helen	Florence Brower
Peggy	Harriette Widmer
Mr. Schultz	Murray Forbes
Bertha Schultz	Patricia Dunlap
George Bartlett	Reese Taylor
Jack Crandall	Les Tremayne
Edith Crandall	Muriel Bremner
Laura Richardson	Kay Campbell
Henry	Cliff Soubier
Virginia Marshall	Eunice Topper
Mr. Conway	John Barclay
Judge Carter Colby	Herb Butterfield
Mrs. Carter Colby	Muriel Bremner
John Murray	Willard Waterman
Announcer	Marvin Miller

== Production ==
Guilbert Gibbons was the director. When the show started, it replaced Arnold Grimm's Daughter.

== See also ==
- List of radio soaps
