= Faire hurler les murs =

1972 Canadian film directed by Jean Saulnier

- Directed by: Jean Saulnier
- Written by: Denys Morisset
- Starring: Jordi Bonet
- Cinematography: Yves Maltais; Paul Vézina
- Edited by: Claude Lavoie
- Music by: Les Stein
- Production companies: Cinéclique; Quebec Ministry of Cultural Affairs; Office du film du Québec
- Release date: 1972
- Running time: 22 minutes
- Country: Canada
- Language: French

Faire hurler les murs is a Canadian short documentary film, directed by Jean Saulnier and released in 1972. The film is a portrait of artist Jordi Bonet, as he works on the mural at the Grand Théâtre de Québec.

The film was co-winner, with Roger Blais's Grierson, of the Canadian Film Award for Best Documentary at the 25th Canadian Film Awards in 1973. The film also won the awards for Best Editing in a Non-Feature (Claude Lavoie), Best Cinematography in a Non-Feature (Paul Vézina, Yves Maltais) and Best Musical Score in a Non-Feature (Les Stein).
