= The Sloane Affair =

- Directed by: Douglas Jackson
- Written by: Douglas Jackson; Alvin Goldman
- Produced by: Douglas Jackson
- Starring: Michael Kane; John Bethune; Cec Linder; Ron Hartmann
- Cinematography: Douglas Kiefer
- Edited by: Les Halman; Ginny Stikeman
- Production company: National Film Board of Canada
- Distributed by: CBC Television
- Release date: February 14, 1973
- Running time: 54 minutes
- Country: Canada
- Language: English

The Sloane Affair is a Canadian docudrama television film, directed by Douglas Jackson and broadcast by CBC Television in 1973. Created by the National Film Board of Canada, the film starred Michael Kane as Alan Sloane, a businessman being prosecuted by the government for tax fraud.

The cast also included Cec Linder, Ron Hartmann, John Bethune, Rex Sevenoaks, Dave Broadfoot, Alfie Scopp and Al Waxman.

The film was funded in part by the Department of National Revenue as an educational film about the legal ramifications of tax fraud, with its screenplay based in part on real tax fraud prosecutions. Critic Blaik Kirby of The Globe and Mail criticized it on these grounds, calling it an "out-and-out propaganda film" and writing that "it's as if writer-producer-director Doug Jackson had an assistant deputy minister assigned to look over his shoulder as he typed, to make sure that the message was sufficiently heavy-handed."

The film won four Canadian Film Awards at the 25th Canadian Film Awards in 1973, for Best TV Drama, Best Art Direction in a Non-Feature, Best Direction in a Non-Feature and Best Screenplay for a Non-Feature.
