= The Collaborators (TV series) =

- Genre: Crime drama; Police procedural
- Created by: Richard Gilbert
- Starring: Michael Kane; Donald Pilon; Paul Harding; Toby Tarnow; Lawrence Benedict; Les Carlson
- Country of origin: Canada
- Original language: English
- No. of seasons: 2
- No. of episodes: 20

Production
- Executive producers: Richard Gilbert; René Bonnière

Original release
- Network: CBC
- Release: December 1973 – December 1974

The Collaborators is a Canadian police procedural crime drama television series that aired on CBC Television between December 1973 and December 1974.

== Premise ==
A team of Metropolitan Toronto Police Department forensic scientists investigate crime scenes, frequently in conflict with the hard-boiled detectives and street cops who work on the front line.

== Cast ==
- Michael Kane as Detective Sergeant Jim Brewer
- Paul Harding as Dr. Charles Erickson (season 1)
- Toby Tarnow as Liz Roman
- Lawrence Benedict as Detective Quinn
- Les Carlson as Detective Kaminski
- Donald Pilon as Detective Sergeant Richard Tremblay (season 2)

== Production ==
=== Concept ===
The Collaborators has been described as an example of how the CBC "continually tried to find an angle in the professions of its investigators." The titular collaborators are the forensic scientists who work with the police. The program ostensibly attempted to deal with the investigative process in an "egalitarian way, from the scene of the crime to the police station to the lab." When Paul Harding left the series after the first season of eight one-hour episodes (before they had even aired), however, he noted that Michael Kane had dominated the show as the principal crime solver.

=== Personnel ===
The show drew on many of English Canada's distinguished directors, including Peter Carter, Don Owen, René Bonnière ("All The King's Men," "A Touch of Madness"), Don Haldane ("Beyond All Reasonable Doubt"), Graham Parker, Allan King, Don Shebib ("Deedee," "Once Upon A Time In Genarro"), and Stan Olson. Show writers included Grahame Woods, George Robertson, Lyal Brown, Tony Sheer, Claude Harz, and Carol Bolt.

Creator Richard Gilbert left the series over a salary dispute and the fact he had not been allowed to direct. Head of Drama John Hirsch replaced Gilbert with a veteran director but novice producer René Bonnière who intended to "lighten" the series.

=== Casting and characterization ===
Michael Kane played the "gruff and instinctive" Brewer, who, with his rugged looks, looking harassed and given to strong emotional expression, fit the type of the television cop or detective. Kane described the character as a combination of various film or television police, like Columbo and John Shaft, but with an "earthly appeal", somewhat like Johnny Cash. Kane appeared in only three episodes in the second season, leaving for health reasons as he found filming series television too much. His character's disappearance was left unexplained.

Kane's replacement, Quebec actor Donald Pilon, is introduced in a forty second scene. Supposedly from Kirkland Lake and unable to speak French, the actor nevertheless spoke with "a francophone lilt" and "Gallic charm and warmth." Pilon plays Tremblay as a different sort of police officer: rational and relaxed to the point of stoicism. Pilon said he wanted the character to be the type of man who makes mistakes and sometimes "doesn't get his man."

=== Filming locations ===
Episodes were filmed in Toronto.

== Marketing ==
Publicity releases for The Collaborators emphasised suspense and "the strange world of modern crime detection techniques" as well as plot intricacies and intrigue.

== Release and reception ==
The Collaborators aired in the "prestigious" Sunday 9 pm time slot, which may have given it a boost: its eight episode first season eventually reached an audience of 2 million, or a 20% share of all the audience watching that night in that time slot, with an enjoyment index average of 70. Audiences liked Kane and Harding, the "naturalistic action and design" and "true to life" plots.

=== Critical response ===
==== Contemporary ====
Jack Miller, writing for the Toronto Daily Star, called the first season the "slickest commercial adventure series" produced to date by the CBC.

The second season received mixed reviews and its audience share declined to 13%.

==== Retrospective ====
Ed Conroy remarks on the series' "seatbelt-less high-speed chases" in yellow police cars and "a menagerie of exotic villains that ranged from gay Nazi bikers to roaming gangs of mute children," asserting that it could only have ever been made in the "brown and orange haze of 1970s Toronto."
