= Betty Lou Gerson =

American actress (1914–1999)

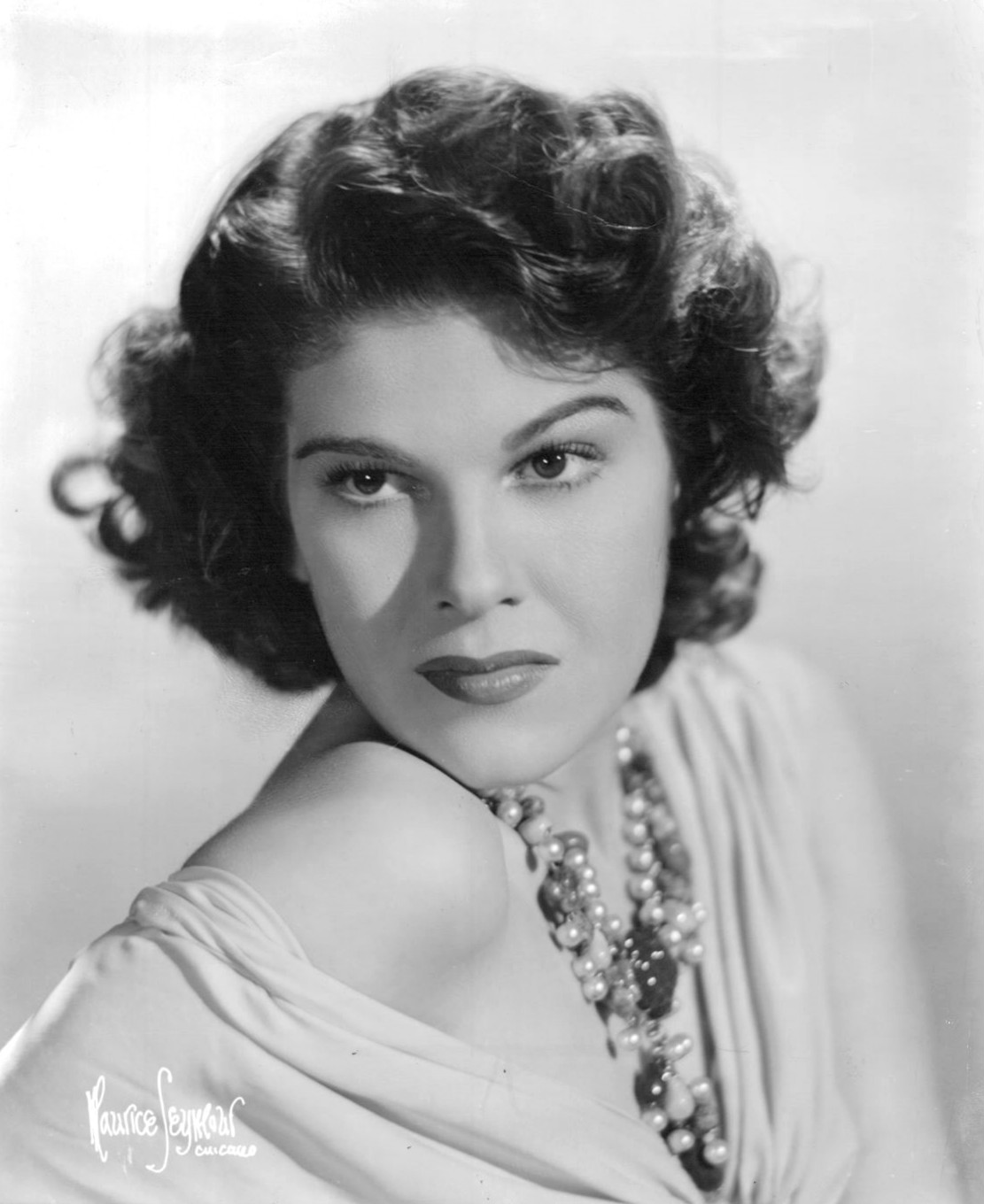
- Gerson in 1941
- Born: April 20, 1914; Chattanooga, Tennessee, U.S.
- Died: January 12, 1999 (aged 84); Los Angeles, California, U.S.
- Occupation: Actress
- Years active: 1935–1997
- Known for: Cruella de Vil in One Hundred and One Dalmatians (1961)
- Spouses: Joe Ainley (m. 1936; died 1965) Louis R. Lauria (m. 1966; died 1994)
- Children: 3 stepchildren
- Awards: Disney Legends (1996)

Betty Lou Gerson (April 20, 1914 – January 12, 1999) was an American actress, predominantly active in radio but also in film and television and as a voice actress. She is best known as the voice of Cruella de Vil in One Hundred and One Dalmatians (1961) for which she was named a Disney Legend in 1996.

== Life and career ==
=== Early life ===
Betty Lou Gerson was born in Chattanooga, Tennessee, on April 20, 1914, but raised in Birmingham, Alabama, where her father was an executive with a steel company. She was Jewish. She was educated in private schools in Birmingham and Miami, Florida. At age 16, she moved with her family to Chicago, where she performed in the radio serial The First Nighter Program. She later moved to New York City.

=== Radio and film ===
She began her acting career in radio drama in 1935, while still in her 20s, and became a mainstay of soap operas during this period, appearing on Arnold Grimm's Daughter (as the titular daughter Constance in 1938), Midstream (in the lead role of Julia), Women in White (as Karen Adams), Road of Life (as Nurse Helen Gowan), Lonely Women (as Marilyn Larimore), and the radio version of The Guiding Light, as Charlotte Wilson in the mid-1940s. She co-starred with Jim Ameche in the 1938 summer drama Win Your Lady and was the resident romantic lead on romantic anthologies such as Curtain Time and Grand Hotel.

Moving to Los Angeles in the 1940s, she established herself on series such as The Whistler, Mr. President (as the presidential secretary), Crime Classics, Escape, and Yours Truly, Johnny Dollar. She was heard in several episodes of Lux Radio Theatre, cast in such roles as Glinda in a 1950 dramatization of The Wizard of Oz. She also played a variety of roles on Johnny Modero, Pier 23. In an early example of the comic genius that her Cruella later showcased, she parodied her main radio persona in the Sam Spade detective series, "The Soap Opera Caper" episode which aired on February 16, 1951.

Around this time, she was cast as the narrator in Walt Disney's animated version of Cinderella (1950). Eleven years later, she provided the voice of the villainous, selfish socialite Cruella de Vil in Disney's animated feature One Hundred and One Dalmatians (1961).

Gerson's film debut occurred in The Red Menace (1949). Her few on-camera film roles include appearances in The Fly (1958), The Miracle of the Hills (1959), and Mary Poppins (1964) in a small cameo as an old crone. In television, she made three guest appearances on Perry Mason, including the role of murderer Marjory Davis in the episode, "The Case of the Foot-Loose Doll" (1959). She also guest starred on The Twilight Zone, The Dick Van Dyke Show, Hazel, Wanted Dead or Alive, and The Rifleman.

=== Family and later life ===
In 1936, Gerson married Joseph T. Ainley at Fourth Presbyterian Church in Chicago. At that time, he was radio director of the Leo Burnett Company, Incorporated. The couple remained married until his death in 1965. The union was childless.

Gerson retired in 1966, though still using her voice, working at the telephone answering service of her second husband, Louis R. "Lou" Lauria, to whom she was married from 1966 until his death in 1994. The second union was also childless.

She was honored as a Disney Legend in 1996. She returned to films one last time in 1997, providing the voice of Frances in Cats Don't Dance.

== Death ==
Gerson died from a stroke in Los Angeles on January 12, 1999, at the age of 84.

== Filmography ==
- The Red Menace (1949) as Greta Bloch, alias Yvonne Kraus
- Cinderella (1950) as Narrator (voice, uncredited)
- Undercover Girl (1950) as Pat (nurse)
- An Annapolis Story (1955) as Mrs. Lord
- The Walter Winchell File, episode titled "A Day in the Sun", as Minna DiOngu (1957)
- The Green-Eyed Blonde (1957) as Mrs. Ferguson (uncredited)
- The Fly (1958) as Nurse Andersone
- The Miracle of the Hills (1959) as Kate Peacock
- One Hundred and One Dalmatians (1961) as Cruella de Vil / Miss Birdwell (voice)
- Mary Poppins (1964) as Old Crone (uncredited)
- Cats Don't Dance (1997) as Frances (voice; final role)
- Chip 'n Dale: Rescue Rangers (2022) as Sweet Pete's laugh (archive recordings, posthumous role)
