= Al Waxman =

Canadian actor and director (1935–2001)

Al Waxman CM OOnt
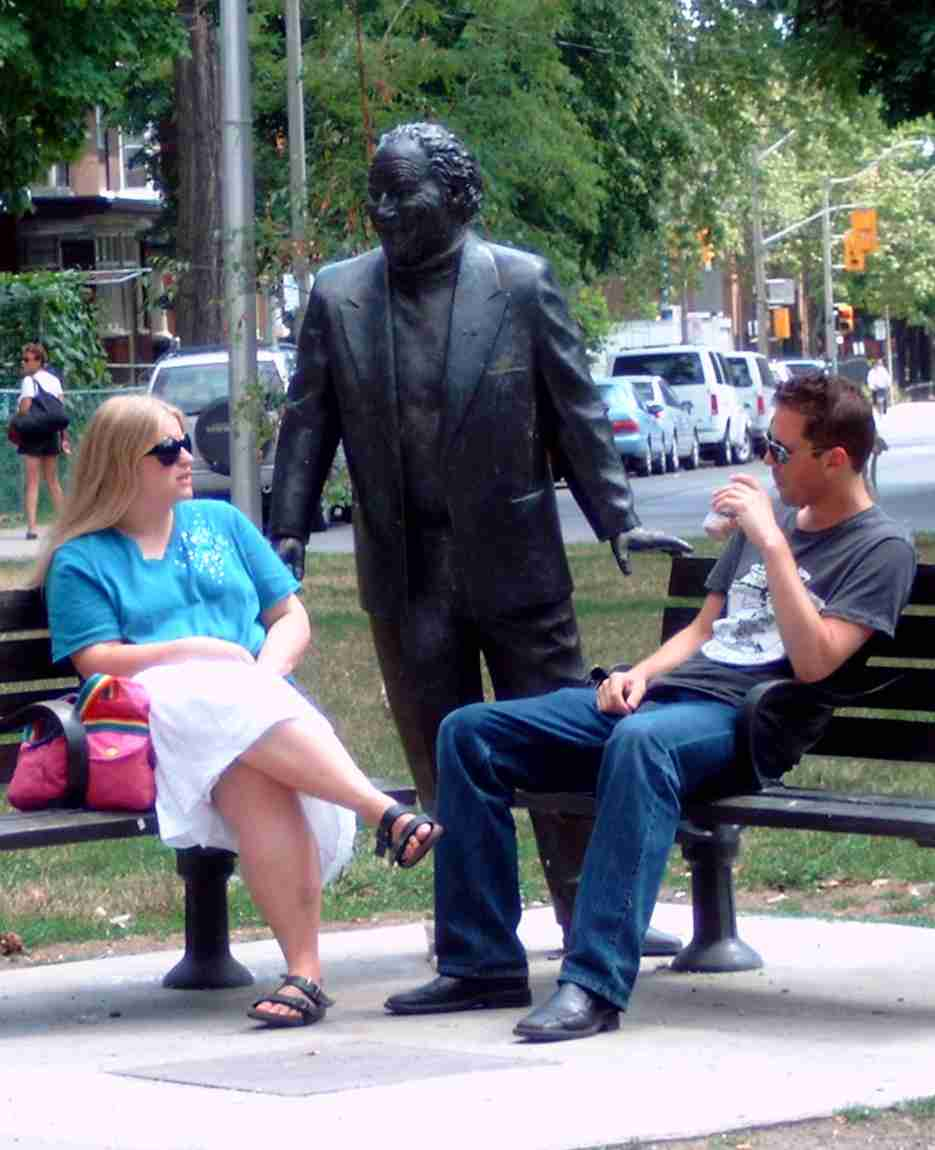
- Statue of Al Waxman in Kensington Market
- Born: Albert Samuel Waxman; March 2, 1935; Toronto, Ontario, Canada
- Died: January 18, 2001 (aged 65); Toronto, Ontario, Canada
- Resting place: Pardes Shalom Cemetery, Vaughan, Ontario, Canada
- Occupations: Actor; director
- Years active: 1959–2001

Albert Samuel Waxman, CM OOnt (March 2, 1935 – January 18, 2001) was a Canadian actor and director of over 1,000 productions on radio, television, film, and stage. He is best known for his starring roles in the television series King of Kensington (CBC), Cagney & Lacey (CBS) and Twice in a Lifetime (CTV).

== Early life ==
Waxman was born in Toronto, Ontario to Jewish immigrants from Poland. His parents operated and owned Melinda Lunch, a small restaurant. His father, Aaron Waxman, died when Al was nine. Waxman attended Central Technical School in Toronto.

== Career ==
Waxman's career began at the age of twelve on CBC Radio, but it was not until 1975, when he began playing the role of Larry King on CBC's King of Kensington, that he became a Canadian icon.

In the 1980 award-winning film Atlantic City, starring Burt Lancaster, Waxman appeared as a rich cocaine buyer with a seemingly endless amount of cash.

Waxman, who attended Central Technical School in Toronto, returned to play Detective Stewiski in Class of 1984 (1982).

During the 1980s, Waxman starred as the gruff but endearing Lt. Bert Samuels in the highly successful CBS television drama Cagney & Lacey.

During the 1990s, Waxman appeared in a variety of films and television shows, but began spending more time acting and directing in the theatre. In 1991, Al hosted Missing Treasures: The Search for Our Lost Children, a TV show which profiled missing children in Canada. He was also a founding member of the Academy of Canadian Cinema & Television.

In 1997, he was awarded the best actor Gemini Award for his performance in the television film Net Worth.

Waxman also appeared at the Stratford Festival, beginning with his critically acclaimed performance as Willy Loman in Death of a Salesman in 1997. He also directed The Diary of Anne Frank at the Stratford Festival in 2000. He was to return to Stratford for his highly anticipated portrayal of Shylock in The Merchant of Venice in 2001. In the wake of Waxman's death, one month before rehearsals were to begin, Paul Soles accepted the part of Shylock and the play was performed in honour of Waxman.

In 1999, he published a memoir, That's What I Am, which received a Canadian Jewish Book Award.

== Community activism ==
Waxman was a spokesperson for organizations such as United Appeal, United Jewish Appeal, Variety Club, Children's Miracle Network, and Big Brothers (also becoming an honorary member). From June 1979 to August 1981, he was the National Campaign Chairman for the Canadian Cancer Society, and from 1988 to 1989, he was an official spokesperson for the Heart & Stroke Foundation of Ontario. Together with his wife, Sara, he created the Sara and Al Waxman Center for Maternal and Fetal Medicine at the Shaare Zedek Medical Center in Jerusalem.

Al Waxman was accorded many tributes for his volunteer and philanthropic work. In 1978, he was honoured with the Queen's Silver Jubilee Medal. In 1989, he was the recipient of the B'nai B'rith of Canada Humanitarian Award. In 1996, Waxman was inducted into the Order of Ontario and, in 1997, into the Order of Canada. In 1998, he was given the Earle Grey Award for lifetime achievement in Canadian television.

== Death and legacy ==
Waxman died in Toronto during heart surgery on January 18, 2001, at the age of 65. He was buried at Pardes Shalom Cemetery in Maple, Ontario.

Following his death, a statue of him, created by Ruth Abernethy, was erected in Kensington Market, the Toronto neighbourhood where King of Kensington takes place. The inscription in front of the statue reads "There's lots to do down the road, there's always more. Trust your gut instincts. In small matters trust your mind, but in the important decisions of life – trust your heart."

Musician Jaymz Bee started the Al Waxman Fan Club while in high school, and started a punk band with his pals Bazl Salazar, Clay Tyson and Graham Leethat performed only songs about Waxman and his life: "'We ended up with an hour-long show, just about Al Waxman.'" What began as a publicity stunt became a long association between Bee and Waxman. Waxman attended some of the fan club events as organized by Bee, most of which raised money for charities such as the Canadian Cancer Foundation and Big Brother. Bee attended Waxman's funeral and, with his fan club, held a wake in Toronto on January 25, 2001.

== Filmography ==
=== Movies ===
- 1959: Sun in My Eyes
- 1961: The Hired Gun
- 1962: The War Lover as Prien: Crew of 'The Body'
- 1963: The Victors as 'The Squad' Member
- 1964: Man in the Middle as Cpll. Zimmerman
- 1967: Do Not Fold, Staple, Spindle or Mutilate
- 1968: Isabel as Herb
- 1970: The Last Act of Martin Weston
- 1971: The Crowd Inside as Director
- 1972: When Michael Calls as Sheriff Hap Washbrook
- 1973: The Sloane Affair as Hogan
- 1974: Child Under a Leaf as Storekeeper
- 1974: Sunday in the Country as Sergeant
- 1974: A Star Is Lost! as Inspector Bruno
- 1975: My Pleasure Is My Business
- 1975: The Heatwave Lasted Four Days as Harry
- 1976: The Clown Murders as Police Sergeant
- 1979: Wild Horse Hank as Jay Connors
- 1980: Atlantic City as Alfie
- 1980: Double Negative as Dellassandro
- 1981: Heavy Metal as Rudnick (segment "Harry Canyon") (voice)
- 1981: Tulips as Bert Irving
- 1982: Class of 1984 as Detective Stewiski
- 1983: Spasms as Warren Crowley
- 1986: Meatballs III: Summer Job as Peter
- 1988: Switching Channels as Berger
- 1988: Malarek as Stern
- 1989: Collision Course as Dingman
- 1989: Millennium as Dr. Brindle
- 1989: Mob Story as Sam
- 1991: Scream of Stone as Stephen
- 1991: The Hitman as Marco Luganni
- 1991: White Light
- 1991: I Still Dream of Jeannie as Gen. Wescott
- 1992: Quiet Killer as Mayor Andy Carmichael
- 1992: Live Wire as James Garvey
- 1992: The Diamond Fleece
- 1994: Operation Golden Phoenix as Chief Gordon
- 1994: Death Junction as Captain Jenkow
- 1994: Cagney & Lacey: The Return as Lt. Bert Samuels
- 1995: Iron Eagle on the Attack as Maj. Gen. Brad Kettle
- 1995: Net Worth as Jack Adams
- 1996: Gotti as Bruce Cutler
- 1996: Bogus as School Principal
- 1996: Holiday Affair as Mr. Corley
- 1997: The Assignment as Carl Mickens - CIA
- 1997: Critical Care as Sheldon Hatchett (a Lawyer)
- 1998: At the End of the Day: The Sue Rodriguez Story as John Hofsess
- 1999: A Saintly Switch as Coach Beasily
- 1999: Summer's End as Grandpa Trapnell
- 1999: The Hurricane as Warden
- 2000: The Thin Blue Lie as Art Zugler
- 2001: Life with Judy Garland: Me and My Shadows as Louis B. Mayer (released posthumously)
- 2001: What Makes a Family as Frank Cataldi (released posthumously)

=== Television series ===
- 1975–1980: King of Kensington as Larry King
- 1981: Circus International
- 1981–1988: Cagney & Lacey as Lt. Bert Samuels
- 1990–1991: Missing Treasures
- 1997: Simply Wine and Cheese
- 1999–2001: Twice in a Lifetime as Judge Othniel / Judge Jepthah / M.C.

=== Television appearances ===
- 1965: For the People as Berkowitz
- 1969: Adventures in Rainbow Country
- 1979, 1983–1984: The Littlest Hobo as Vic Carrano / Vernie Davis
- 1979: The Winnings of Frankie Walls as Frankie Walls
- 1985: Night Heat
- 1986: Philip Marlowe, Private Eye as Trimmer Waltz
- 1988: My Secret Identity
- 1988: Street Legal as Judge John R. Caldwell
- 1988: Alfred Hitchcock Presents as Dale Linseman
- 1989: Hard Time on Planet Earth
- 1989: Murder, She Wrote as Carl Wilson
- 1993: Sweating Bullets as Brennan
- 1993: Scales of Justice
- 1994–1998: Due South as Nicholas Van Zandt / Vince Leggett
- 1995–2000: Ace Ventura: Pet Detective as Aguado (voice)
- 1998: Twitch City as Bum
- 1998–2000: Power Play
