= Guiding Light (1950–1959) =

American television soap opera

The Guiding Light (known since 1975 as Guiding Light) is an American television soap opera. Between 1952 and 1956, it was the only soap opera to play on both radio and television.

== Show development ==
On June 30, 1952, The Guiding Light began airing on CBS television. From June 30, 1952, to August 31, 1956, The Guiding Light ran on both CBS radio and television, with the actors performing, the same scenes but for different audiences, live twice each weekday. The live television performances were in the morning, and then in the afternoon the actors read for the live radio show. On September 3, 1956, The Guiding Light became a CBS television show, only, and the show no longer was heard on radio. Episodes continued at 15 minutes in length.

In 1954, CBS strongly persuaded Irna Phillips to let The Guiding Light experiment with television's first color broadcast. Phillips was not thrilled with the concept of color television, and thwarted the effort by CBS by having that day's episode take place entirely in a hospital setting with gray walls and white uniforms. The Guiding Light was broadcast in black and white for the remainder of the decade.

In 1956, Phillips created As the World Turns, which first started airing on April 2, 1956 on CBS. When the workload of writing both that show and The Guiding Light became too much for her, Phillips handed the reins at The Guiding Light to her protégé Agnes Nixon. Though Agnes was the head writer, Irna dictated one last storyline, and on February 27, 1958, popular heroine Katherine "Kathy" Roberts Lang Grant Holden (played by the equally popular Susan Douglas Rubeš) was killed off. Kathy, who used a wheelchair, was killed after being struck by a car. CBS was deluged with protest letters.

Prior to the launches of the half-hour shows As the World Turns, and The Edge of Night (both launched the same day), CBS and Procter & Gamble tried to convince Phillips to combine The Guiding Light and Search for Tomorrow into one single half-hour show. Phillips declined.

== Major characters ==
The Bauer's
Character	Actor	Start date	End date
Friedrich 'Papa' Bauer	Theo Goetz	July 3, 1952	Ongoing
Meta Bauer Roberts	Jone Allison	June 30, 1952	December 26, 1952
Meta Bauer Roberts	Ellen Demming	January 12, 1953	Ongoing
Trudy Bauer Palmer	Anne Marie Gayer	June 30, 1952	July 10, 1952
Trudy Bauer Palmer	Lisa Howard	March 4, 1957	March 7, 1957
Trudy Bauer Palmer	Lisa Howard	November 26, 1957	July 14, 1958
Trudy Bauer Palmer	Unknown Actress	July 7, 1959	August 25, 1959
Bill Bauer	Lyle Sudrow	July 1, 1952	December 26, 1958
Bill Bauer	Ed Bryce	August 4, 1959	Ongoing
Bert Bauer	Charita Bauer	July 3, 1952	Ongoing
Michael 'Mike' Bauer	Glenn Walken	December 24, 1953	April 19, 1957
Michael 'Mike' Bauer	Michael Allen	June 25, 1957	Ongoing
William "Billy" Edward Bauer Jr.	Pat Collins	March 5, 1957	Ongoing

- Michael Bauer is the eldest son of Bill and Bert Bauer, born March 31, 1952 and first seen without lines on August 5, 1953. Glenn's brother Christopher Walken filled in temporarily when Glenn was sick.
- Billy Bauer is the second son of Bill and Bert Bauer, born on December 30, 1954.

The Robert's
Character	Actor	Start date	End date
Joe Roberts	Herbert "Herb" Nelson	June 30, 1952	December 13, 1955
Kathy Roberts Lang Grant Holden	Susan Douglas Rubeš	June 30, 1952	February 14, 1958
Joey Roberts	Tarry Green	July 3, 1952	July 15, 1953
Joey Roberts	Richard Holland	June 25, 1954	August 2, 1954
Joey Roberts	Richard Holland	December 8, 1955	December 15, 1955

The Grant's
Character	Actor	Start date	End date
Dr. Richard 'Dick' Grant, Jr.	James Lipton	July 28, 1952	Ongoing
Richard Grant, Sr.	Ed Prentiss	September 9, 1952	August 8, 1955
Richard Grant, Sr.	Ed Prentiss	May 31, 1957	May 31, 1957
Laura Grant	Alice Yourman	August 4, 1952	Ongoing
Karen 'Bunny' Grant	Unknown Actress	August 7, 1952	December 29, 1952
Karen 'Bunny' Grant	Barbara Joyce	September 15, 1953	September 16, 1953
Karen 'Bunny' Grant	Unknown Actress	April 16, 1955	June 8, 1955
Karen 'Bunny' Grant	Unknown Actress	May 15, 1956	May 16, 1956
Karen 'Bunny' Grant	Unknown Actress	May 31, 1957	May 31, 1957

The Fletcher's/Benedict's
Character	Actor	Start date	End date
Dr. Paul Fletcher	Michael Kane	December 13, 1956	May 31, 1957
Dr. Paul Fletcher	Bernard Grant	June 17, 1957	Ongoing
Fred Fletcher	John Gibson	December 5, 1958	March 9, 1959
Marian Winters Lipsey	Katherine Meskill	February 13, 1958	April 27, 1959
John Lipsey	Unknown Actor	November 5, 1957	March 20, 1959
Jane Fletcher	Unknown Actress	November 24, 1958	March 6, 1959
Anne Benedict Fletcher	Joan Gray	April 30, 1958	Ongoing
Henry Benedict	John Boruff	September 22, 1958	March 9, 1959
Helene Benedict	Unknown Actress	August 25, 1958	March 9, 1959

- The family was built around Paul Fletcher, his adoptive father John, mother Marian, biological father Fred, half-sister Jane and his wife Anne and her parents Henry and Helene. Jane, Henry and Helene would return to the show after their initial departures.

The Holden's
Character	Actor	Start date	End date
Mark Holden	Whitfield Connor	March 23, 1956	Ongoing
Alice Holden	Sandy Dennis	February 26, 1957	April 15, 1957
Alice Holden	Diane Gentner	June 27, 1957	March 12, 1958
Alice Holden	Lin Pearson	April 4, 1958	July 14, 1959
Robin Lang Holden	Judy Sanford	June 24, 1955	December 30, 1955
Robin Lang Holden	Zina Bethune	January 9, 1957	July 10, 1959
Robin Lang Holden	Judy Robinson	August 28, 1959	Ongoing
Ruth Jannings Holden	Irja Jensen	September 24, 1958	January 14, 1959
Ruth Jannings Holden	Louise Platt	February 2, 1959	June 22, 1959
Ruth Jannings Holden	Virginia Dwyer	August 20, 1959	Ongoing
Karl Jannings	Karl Morse	August 20, 1959	Ongoing

- Family was built around Mark Holden who married Kathy Roberts and adopted her daughter Robin. When Kathy died he re-married to Ruth Jannings who had a son Karl from a previous marriage. Mark's sister Alice also lived with him for a short time.

Other characters

- Dr. Bruce Banning (Lester "Les" Damon, July 1, 1952 to July 9, 1952 and November 26, 1957 to end of decade)
- Gloria La Rue Harper (Anne Burr McDermott, July 4, 1952 to November 2, 1953)
- Sid Harper (Philip Sterling, July 4, 1952 to June 3, 1954)
- Alice Graham (Jean Gillespie, July 8, 1952 to March 4, 1953) Kathy's roommate.
- Bob Lang (William Redfield, July 25, 1952 to September 12, 1952) Kathy's first husband, father of Robin, killed in car accident.
- John 'Mac" McIntyre (Arnold Peterson, September 25, 1952 to August 25, 1953; Charles Bang, March 8, 1955 to January 25, 1956)
- Don Crane (Nat Polen, October 09, 1952 to March 03, 1953)
- Reverend Dr. Paul Keeler (Melville Ruick January 12, 1953 to June 25, 1954)
- Richard Hanley (Mandel Kramer, January 26, 1953 to September 21, 1954)
- Dr. Baird (Peter Capell, February 10, 1953 - August 8, 1955)
- Peggy Regan (Patricia Wheel, February 13, 1953 to March 28, 1955)
- Janet Johnson (Ruth Warrick, May 14, 1953 to October 8, 1954; Lois Wheeler, October 29, 1954 to August 12, 1955, then June 11, 1957 to July 23, 1958 then May 26, 1959 to September 25, 1959)
- Helen Allen (Muriel Kirkland, September 9, 1953 to July 23, 1954; Margaret Draper, April 7, 1955 to January 25, 1957 and June 29, 1959 to September 28, 1959) Bob Lang's mother
- Elsie Miller Franklin (Margaret Burlan, August 18, 1953 to October 23, 1953; Ethel Remey June 17, 1955 to July 31, 1957) Bert and Alma-Jean's mother.
- Carl Miller (September 23, 1953 to October 16, 1953) Bert and Alma-Jean's father. Died in 1955.
- Dr. Jim Kelly (Paul Potter, November 30, 1953 to May 31, 1957)
- Dan Peters (Paul Ballantyne, December 1, 1953 – July 15, 1954)
- Dr. Bart Thompson (Barry Thomson, September 3, 1954 to August 12, 1955)
- Dr. John Brooks (Charles Baxter, December 22, 1954 to June 27, 1955)
- Mrs. Maggie Laurey (Lois Wilson, January 4, 1955 to September 5, 1955; Virginia Payne, March 30, 1956 - June 7, 1956 and November 29, 1957)
- Marie Wallace Grant (Lynne Rogers, January 14, 1955 to end of decade)
- Lila Taylor Kelly (Nancy Wickwire, October 10, 1955 to August 17, 1956; Teri Keane, September 5, 1956 to May 31, 1957)
- Dan Clark (Unknown, April 23, 1956 to May 14, 1957)
- Albert Franklin (Unknown, August 28, 1956 to June 24, 1957) Elsie's second husband, character killed off.
- Clyde Palmer (Carl Low, March 5 & 7, 1957 and November 26, 1957 to July 10, 1958) Trudy's husband.
- Judith Morrow (Unknown, February 17, 1958 to March 12, 1959)
- Nora Gibbs (Joanne Linville, May 19, 1959 to December 22, 1959)
- Joe Turino (Joseph Campanella, April 9, 1959 to end of decade)

== 1952 ==
Meta runs away from her marital problems with Joe Roberts but quickly returns home determined to save her marriage, only to find Kathy still unwilling to accept her and living with the manipulative Alice Graham. Kathy, lonely and confused, clings to memories of Dick Grant despite Laura Grant’s interference. She keeps Bob Lang on a string until she impulsively marries him. The marriage collapses instantly, and during an argument in the car, Bob speeds off, crashes, and dies. Terrified, Kathy flees and lets Alice convince her to stay silent, as she also discovers she’s pregnant. Dick, finally learning his mother kept them apart, reconciles with Kathy and pushes for a quick wedding, unaware of the truth. Kathy confesses everything to Meta and pressures her into keeping the secret.

Meanwhile, Gloria LaRue leaves her TV show rather than work with Bill Bauer, and Alice replaces her—using what she knows about Kathy to blackmail Bill and protect her new job. Reporter Don Crane begins investigating Bob’s death, uncovering Kathy’s marriage license and suspecting foul play. Joe confronts Kathy repeatedly, but she lies until Meta finally breaks and tells him the truth. Joe informs Crane, who refuses to drop the story. Under pressure, Alice flees to New York. Amid the turmoil, the Bauers cling to a moment of peace on Christmas Day, celebrating baby Michael’s first holiday together.

== 1953 ==
Kathy pleads with reporter Don Crane to stay silent, but he refuses, triggering a police investigation that leads to her arrest. Meta panics and tells Dick about Kathy’s secret marriage to Bob. Under pressure, Kathy breaks down and falsely confesses to killing Bob, while Laura urges Dick to divorce her. Dick refuses, and Joe launches his own investigation, eventually uncovering evidence that Bob’s brakes were faulty. The grand jury clears Kathy, but emotionally shattered, she enters a sanatorium. Kathy’s baby Robin is born by caesarean, and Kathy’s choice of name reignites Dick’s doubts about the baby’s paternity. When Kathy becomes delirious with pneumonia, Nurse Peggy overhears her confess the truth about Robin’s father. Kathy survives but remembers nothing of the birth.

Meanwhile, Bill loses his job, relapses into drinking, and disappears with Papa’s money. Bert briefly leaves for Arizona before returning to support him, and Bill eventually accepts a job in New York. Dick graduates’ medical school and begins working with Nurse Janet Johnson, who draws him into an affair as Kathy becomes obsessively attached to Robin and shuts him out. Helen Allen, Bob’s mother, confronts Kathy, who finally admits Robin’s true paternity. Dick reveals he already knew and decides to divorce her and marry Janet, horrifying his family. Peggy grows close to the mysterious Dan Peters, and Dr. Jim Kelly challenges Dick at work. The year ends with Bill, Bert, Papa, and Michael spending Christmas with Kathy—where Michael and Robin meet for the first time.

== 1954 ==
Joe investigates Judith Weber’s shooting and discovers clues linking Dan to her. Dan confesses privately to Peggy that Judith died accidentally during his attempt to get money for surgery, and Peggy protects him even as Joe grows suspicious. After his bandages come off, Dan flees to Chicago to confront his brother Paul, who refuses to help. Dan returns to Los Angeles, turns himself in, and receives a twenty year sentence, leaving Peggy devastated. Dick seeks to end his marriage so he can be with Janet, pursuing an annulment when he can’t get a divorce. Kathy contests it by insisting Robin is his child, but the lie pushes Dick to fury and Kathy collapses. Dick begins to have doubts about Janet, but Janet tightens her grip, even buying her own engagement ring. Kathy eventually gives in to Dick, and Helen takes her and Robin to Miami Beach to recover.

Meanwhile, Mike is having behavioural problems because he misses Bill, nearly running away to find him. Bill decides to stay in Los Angeles for his son despite fearing relapse. Dick considers a job in New York but ultimately stays in Los Angeles and tells Janet he never loved her, prompting her to quietly vow revenge. Dr. Bart Thompson takes the position Dick hoped for and immediately clashes with him. Kathy returns without Robin and begins dating Jim, worrying Meta. Bart humiliates Dick in surgery, and Dick disappears. At home, Bert discovers she’s pregnant. Mike resents the idea of a new baby. The year ends with the Bauers celebrating Christmas together, and on New Year’s Eve, baby Billy Edward Bauer is born.

== 1955 ==
Dick hides in New York under an alias, watched over by Mrs. Laury, who senses how fragile he is. Marie Wallace befriends him and becomes the first person he begins to trust, even as he keeps his past hidden. After an Easter sermon pushes him to reach out, he finally writes home and admits his identity to Mrs. Laury—who reveals she and Marie already knew. Kathy, realizing she still loves him, heads to New York just as Dick returns to Los Angeles. At Cedars, Bart replaces Dick with Dr. John Brooks, secretly his son. When John and Janet are involved in a car crash, Bart panics and confesses the truth to Jim, who tries but fails to save John. John dies never knowing Bart was his father, leaving Bart devastated and clinging to Dick, who has returned, as the son he lost. Meanwhile, Bert’s father dies, Elsie moves in, and tensions rise as she openly favors the new baby over Mike.

In New York, Marie is told she must give up painting and grows lonelier. She meets Kathy, who sees Marie’s portrait of Dick and suspects she was the woman in his life. Mrs. Laury, protective of Marie, reveals Dick’s past and pushes her toward him. Dick urges Marie to come to Los Angeles for treatment, unaware Kathy is also returning. Marie arrives first and, under Laura’s influence, hides Kathy’s return. Laura lies that Dick and Marie are engaged, and by the time Dick seeks Kathy out, she has already left for Zurich. Marie’s eyesight worsens, and she begins sketching a mysterious woman, Lila Taylor, who soon draws Jim’s interest. Joe suddenly falls ill, and Kathy is summoned home, but he dies before she arrives. Kathy and Meta grieve together, and when Kathy and Dick finally meet again, they uncover Laura’s lies. Though the truth is finally out, both accept that too much has changed. They part gently, and Kathy returns to Switzerland, leaving Dick to face the future alone.

== 1956 ==
Dick cuts ties with Laura, while Marie refuses to help her reconcile with him. At home, Elsie’s favoritism toward the new baby drives Mike to run away; Marie’s sketch helps police find him. Bill introduces Meta to Mark Holden, and after Elsie returns to Arizona, Meta and Mark grow close.

Meanwhile, Jim and Lila fall in love, and when she’s diagnosed with tuberculosis, Jim stays with her through quarantine. Marie is cleared by her specialist and must choose between Los Angeles and New York, forcing her to confront her feelings for Dick. Kathy, now in New York with Helen and Robin, is dating Dan Clark but rejects his marriage proposal. Marie also returns to New York, meets Kathy, and the two reflect on their shared past with Dick.

Back in Los Angeles, Bert learns Elsie plans to marry Albert Franklin. Though Bill fears a scam, Albert proves sincere, and Meta, seeing Elsie’s happiness, finally feels ready to move on. Mark proposes, and she accepts, though Bill and Papa worry the match is uneven. Kathy returns home, meets Mark, and quickly senses he belongs with her, not Meta.

Dan tells Meta the truth about Kathy and Mark, confirming her fears, and the family rallies around her. Kathy plans for Mark to adopt Robin, upsetting Helen, and Robin becomes ill from fear of losing her father’s memory. Lila recovers and elopes with Jim to Chicago. Dick injures his hand in a car crash, ending his surgical career, and shifts to internal medicine, where he meets his new roommate, Dr. Paul Fletcher. On Christmas Day, the Bauers gather quietly at Meta’s home as she struggles through the holiday.

== 1957 ==
Mark pressures Kathy to marry him, while Bill shuts them both out. Meta, lonely, reaches out to Robin despite warnings. Kathy prepares for the wedding haunted by Bob’s memory, and Robin refuses to attend. Afterward, Papa urges Meta to let Mark go, but she can’t. Mark, exhausted, considers sending Robin away. Kathy, overwhelmed, thinks of leaving California—until she learns she’s pregnant. Robin overhears and tells Mark first. Paul and Dick open a practice, and Paul hides Albert’s terminal diagnosis. Mark proposes adopting Robin, but Kathy begins to hemorrhage and is confined to bed. Dick and Marie marry, as Paul suddenly disappears, resurfacing mysteriously in Arizona. Back home, Robin meets a now teenage Michael and briefly bonds with Paul before turning hostile again when Mark’s teenage sister Alice arrives. Kathy falls, loses the baby, and learns she may never walk again. While she recovers, Robin moves in with Meta. Albert dies, and Elsie stays behind in Arizona.

Mark is furious when Robin says she’s glad Kathy lost the baby, and Dick shares his outrage. Kathy is told her paralysis may be permanent. Family tensions rise as Robin openly chooses Meta over her mother, and Mark’s patience snaps. Dick offers Kathy a slim chance at recovery through risky surgery, and she worries what will happen to Robin if she dies. Marie accepts she cannot have children and longs to adopt. Meta travels to New York, confronting old wounds with Bruce and Trudy. Kathy is relieved when Robin finally softens, and they begin rebuilding their relationship. Mark formally adopts Robin, giving her the name she’s long wanted. The families gather for the holidays, while Paul delivers the first baby of 1958 alone, feeling the distance between himself and the others.

== 1958 ==
Kathy refuses the surgery that might let her walk again, and is struck by a car and killed, leaving Mark, Robin, and the Bauers devastated. Bruce proposes to Meta, but she hesitates, returning home to care for Robin, who clings to Paul for comfort. As Meta grows closer to Robin, Bill and Bruce both fear that Meta is drifting back toward Mark. Bruce eventually releases Meta from their engagement, knowing her heart still belongs to Mark, while Meta temporarily leaves town with Robin, unsure of her future. Meanwhile, Mark collapses from exhaustion, and while recuperating, Janet tries to pursue him, but he insists he’ll never love anyone but Kathy. Meta bristles when Bert reminds her she isn’t Robin’s mother and later finally confesses to Bill that she never stopped loving Mark. Robin overhears this confession and becomes excited at the prospect of having Meta and Mark together.

Marian Winters, a woman from Paul’s past, reappears and reveals she's his mother. Paul throws himself into caring for the gravely ill Anne Benedict, working beside Marian despite his resentment. Anne admits to her parents, Henry and Helene that she no longer wants the life planned for her in San Francisco or her engagement to fiancé Tom. While Paul fights his feelings for Anne, Anne’s parents fear Paul is after her money but she stands firm. Paul begins searching for his father, only to panic when he meets his half sister and learns of a brother he never knew. Terrified his past will be exposed, Paul convinces Anne to elope. Their marriage lands in the society pages, catching the attention of Paul’s father, Fred Fletcher, who sends a letter that arrives after they leave on their honeymoon.

Mark offers Bill a job in Boston, but Bert resists uprooting Mike. Papa suggests Bert and the boys stay with him and Meta. Christmas brings the Bauers and Holdens together at Meta’s house, where Bill takes a family photo before leaving for Boston. As Paul and Anne spend New Year’s Eve alone, Paul wonders what the truth about his past will mean for the life he has just begun.

== 1959 ==
Henry exposes Paul’s illegitimate birth hoping to break up his marriage, but Anne refuses to leave him, however the shock sends her to the hospital, where she briefly learns she’s pregnant before miscarrying. Fred, feeling guilty, suggests marrying Marian so Paul can finally have his name. When Fred suffers a heart attack, Paul rushes to him and they finally meet and Paul forgives him as he dies.

Marie and Dick drift apart, so they agree to begin the adoption process. At the same time a pregnant woman, Nora Gibbs, asks Marie to raise her baby. The agency rejects Marie’s adoption request after learning Dick never wanted a child, and Marie’s anger spreads to everyone. Nora gives birth, and Marie insists on caring for both mother and baby. Nora abruptly leaves for Las Vegas, abandoning her baby with Marie. When Nora and her husband are presumed dead, Marie lies to keep the baby.

Meta grows more determined to win Mark, and Robin keeps trying to push them together, but Mark has been seeing Ruth Jannings and they admit they’re in love, devastating Robin. Meta tries to guilt Ruth into stepping aside, and Robin’s desperation becomes deadly. Ruth, feeling guilty, decides to leave for Chicago—until Mark insists that she stay and marry him. Mark and Ruth marry quietly in San Francisco. Meta’s meddling pushes Robin to call their hotel, where she learns there is now a “Mrs. Holden.” Robin runs away to her grandmothers in New York, and Meta confesses she engineered the call. In New York, Meta admits to Robin that she manipulated her to keep Mark from Ruth, destroying their bond, and Robin leaves for Europe with her grandmother. Mark and Ruth return with Ruth’s son Karl, while Robin comes home wanting to live with Meta. Karl and Mike bond during a road trip to enrol at UCLA, while Robin pursues acting, grows more alienated, secretly dates Karl, and rejects Mark as her father, calling herself Robin Lang.

At Christmas, Bruce proposes to Meta, and she accepts. Marie’s obsession with the baby pushes Dick to the breaking point. As the decade ends, Paul and Anne welcome their son, Johnny Fletcher, on New Year’s Eve.
