= Fox News (1919–1930) =

First newsreel broadcast in the United States

“National Colored Tournament” Shot at the Shady Rest Golf and Country Club in Scotch Plains, New Jersey, the frame shows members of the nation’s first African-American golf club posing for Fox News on July 12, 1925.

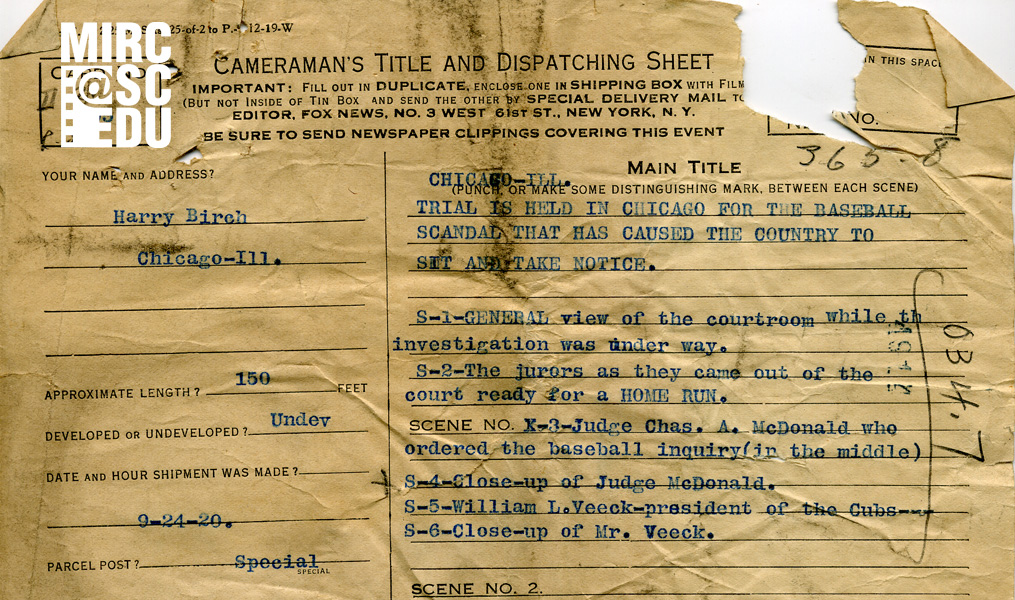
A portion of the original cameraman's information sheet for Fox News story 4914, which covered the Chicago Black Socks trial in 1920. The cameraman, Harry Birch, was Fox News' first Chicago staff cameraman.

Fox News was the original newsreel established by movie mogul William Fox. It was eventually replaced by Fox's pioneering sound newsreel, Fox Movietone News, which began regular operations in December 1927.

William Fox had great ambitions for his newsreel from the very beginning; he even managed to secure a letter from President Woodrow Wilson endorsing his newsreel. At its launch in 1919, Fox had already secured a network of camera operators spanning the globe. Ernest Howard Culbertson served as head of the newsreel features department. Although the newsreel began acquiring stories in August 1919, the newsreel did not begin a regular, twice-weekly release until October 1919. From the beginnings of its operations, Fox News' main domestic rivals were Hearst News, Pathé News, International News and Kinograms.

Like its competitors, Fox News released two newsreels each week. The scope and content of these reels established a pattern for moving image journalism that carried forward to television news. Headlining stories of global or national importance were followed by others touching on events both serious and not-so-serious. Sports and celebrity news (especially arrivals on ocean liners docking in New York) were common items. Human interest stories were also of import. The final issue of Fox News (volume 11, number 53) was released to theaters in March 1930.

During its production, Fox's New York offices acquired millions of feet of negative film from all over the world. Also included in this library were the negatives for Fox's other non-fiction shorts like Fox Varieties. When Fox Films ceased production of Fox News, the extensive library of unused and outtake film was folded into the Fox Movietone News library and was used internally as stock footage by Fox Films and 20th Century Fox until the corporation ceased production of Fox Movietone News in 1963.

As part of its gift of newsreel material to the University of South Carolina announced in 1979, 20th Century Fox donated all remaining elements from the original Fox News library. Estimated at 3 million feet of film, the original, camera‐negative nitrate film from this newsreel is arguably the most significant film record of American life, politics, and culture in the 1920s.

Fox News developed a comprehensive library system to keep track of the negative films being sent to New York from all over the world. Library story numbers were assigned to each roll of film and these numbers are still used today by the University of South Carolina to identify the films. On each "dope sheet" (i.e., the notes taken by newsreel camera operators in the field) was stamped a unique library number and this number was then written onto the tail of the film negative. Fox News story numbers run in series: 0001–9999, A0001–A9999, B0001–B9999, C0001–C9999, and D0001–D4444. The last films registered into the Fox News library date from April 1930.

Moving Image Research Collections at the University of South Carolina provides access to Fox News and Fox Movietone News materials online. A comprehensive listing of companies and camera operators that submitted film to Fox News is available online. This listing provides names and locations of over 700 individuals and 170 businesses or organizations.
