= Living Dramas of the Bible =

American radio Biblical anthology

Living Dramas of the Bible is an American Biblical anthology radio program that was broadcast on CBS in 1937.

== Overview ==
Living Dramas of the Bible presented Biblical stories adapted by contemporary authors. CBS said that episodes "employ a more contemporary idiom and at the same time retain all the poetic qualities of the original stories." At least one episode, "Susannah and the Elders", was adapted from the Apocrypha. The first episode depicted the trials of Job, and the second related the story of Joseph. A minister, a priest, and a rabbi reviewed the contents of episodes, and CBS offered to provide copies of the scripts to American churches.

Actors who appeared on the program included Stefan Schnabel and George Gaul.

Writers for the series included Margaret Widdemer, Charles G. Jackson, Albert Tracy Huntington, John Alcorn, Stanley Silverman, Thyra Samter Winslow, Ernest Howard Culbertson, Margaret Sangster and Lewis Beach.

== Selected episodes ==
Selected Episodes of Living Dramas of the Bible
Date	Episode
July 4, 1937	"Esther"
July 11, 1937	"Susannah and the Elders"
July 18, 1937	"Deborah"
August 8, 1937	"The Shunnamite Woman"
August 15, 1937	"The Destruction of Jericho"
September 5, 1937	"Jacob and Esau"
September 12, 1937	"King Solomon"
September 19, 1937	"Absalom"
September 26, 1937	"David and Bathsheba"

== Production ==
Douglas Coulter conceived the program, Max Wylie was the producer and William N. Robson was the director, with Earl McGill sometimes substituting for him. The show was broadcast on Sundays from 2:30 to 3 p.m. Eastern Time. It was sustaining.

Creating realistic sounds for the dramas sometimes required sound personnel to conduct research and reproduce ancient hardware. For example, to create an authentic sound of a door being unlocked in "The Shunnamite Woman", the sound-effects crew used a Bible concordance to find plans for the locks used in the Old Testament era. They then built one to use in the episode. That lock was in a door that turned on stone hinges, which the crew also reproduced to make the sound realistic.

== Critical response ==
Time magazine called the premiere episode "a thoughtful, serene projection of the familiar troubles of Job."

A review in the trade publication Radio Daily said of the premiere episode, "the cast under the direction of William N. Robson is an excellent one." It concluded that the program "makes good entertainment aside from its elevating and worthwhile qualities."
