= Michael Kane (actor) =

Canadian actor (1922–2007)

Michael Kane (March 21, 1922 – December 14, 2007) was a Canadian film and television actor, who worked in both Canadian and American film and television. He was most noted as a two-time ACTRA Award nominee for Best Television Performance, receiving nods at the 2nd ACTRA Awards in 1973 for the television film The Disposable Man, and at the 4th ACTRA Awards in 1975 for the drama series The Collaborators.

== Background and family ==
A native of Montreal, Quebec, he served in the Royal Canadian Air Force during World War II, and decided to pursue acting after participating in variety shows.

He was the uncle of actor Art Hindle.

== Career ==
He began his acting career in New York City, appearing in dramatic anthology television series such as Lights Out, The Web, Omnibus and Camera Three. He also played Angus in the 1954 television production of Macbeth, and had a role for several months in the soap opera Guiding Light.

In 1957 he won an award for his performance in an Off-Broadway production of James Joyce's play Exiles. In the same year he was cast as Laertes in the Stratford Festival production of Hamlet, but was dropped from the production and subsequently sued for wrongful dismissal. The following year he staged his own one-man show in Stratford, without festival participation, receiving acclaim for his selection of monologues by various playwrights.

In 1959 he starred as Jamie in a production of Long Day's Journey into Night for Montreal's Théâtre du Nouveau Monde, alongside Ian Keith as James, Mildred Dunnock as Mary, Eileen Clifford as Cathleen and Roland Hewgill as Edmund.

In the early 1960s he moved to England, where he had some success in stage roles until his career was disrupted by the rise to fame of the similarly-named Michael Caine.

In 1965 he appeared in the film The Bedford Incident.

In 1967, he returned to Montreal to perform the one-man show Michael Kane on Stage. He returned to living in Canada permanently soon afterward, and was again regularly featured in Canadian television and stage productions, including a 1968 guest appearance in Quentin Durgens, M.P., the theatrical film Love in a Four Letter World, and the television films Fringe Benefits, The Day They Killed the Snowman, The Disposable Man, and The Sloane Affair.

Beginning in 1973 he starred as Jim Brewer in the first season of the police drama series The Collaborators. After shooting three episodes of the show's second season he left the series, with the Canadian Broadcasting Corporation stating that he left for health reasons, but Kane disputed that, claiming that he had been fired for demanding a pay increase due to excessive overtime work.

Throughout his career, he was also a frequent narrator of documentary films for the National Film Board of Canada and other documentary producers.

== Filmography ==
=== Film ===
Year	Title	Role	Notes
1962	Lonely Are the Brave	Paul Bondi	
1965	The Bedford Incident	Cmdr. Allison	
1965	Promise Her Anything	Staff doctor	
1970	Love in a Four Letter World	Harry Haven	
1975	Three Days of the Condor	S.W. Wicks	
1980	Middle Age Crazy	Abe Titus	
1980	The Kidnapping of the President	Herb Morris	
1981	Your Ticket Is No Longer Valid	Steinhart	
1983	Cross Country	Harry Burns	

=== Television ===
Year	Title	Role	Notes
1950	Lights Out		One episode
1950	The Web		One episode
1954	Macbeth	Angus	
1955	Omnibus	Homer	
1955-58	Camera Three	Various roles	
1956	Guiding Light	Paul Fletcher	
1957	The Seven Lively Arts	Narrator	One episode
1959-60	R.C.M.P.	Various characters	Three episodes
1960	The Romance of Science	Charles Darwin	
1968	Quentin Durgens, M.P.	Damon Kingsley Branch	One episode
1969	Fringe Benefits		
1970	The Day They Killed the Snowman	Eli Sommer	Television film
1972	The Disposable Man	George Harris	Television film
1973	The Sloane Affair	Alan Sloane	
1973-74	The Collaborators	Det. Sgt. Jim Brewer	
1987	The Gunfighters	Governor Hornbeck	

=== Documentary narration ===
Year	Title	Notes
1958	The Face of the High Arctic	
1965	Buster Keaton Rides Again	
1966	Never a Backward Step	
1973	Grierson	
1978	Harness the Wind	
1979	Going the Distance	
