= Sharon Keogh =

Canadian broadcaster and naturalist

- Born: Toronto, Ontario, Canada
- Occupations: Writer; Producer
- Years active: 1970-present

Sharon Keogh is a television and radio writer/producer and naturalist. Her programs have been featured on CBC radio and television, Showtime, TVOntario, Arte, Bravo, SCN, and Vision. Her environmental work includes restoring historical landscapes.

== Biography ==
Keogh was born and raised in Toronto, Ontario and attended Loretto Abbey Catholic Secondary School, where she graduated with honours as an Ontario Scholar. Winning scholarships, she attended first the University of Windsor followed by the University of Toronto, majoring in English literature.

After graduation, Keogh began working as a radio producer for the CBC in Toronto. In 1970 she met her husband, David Acomba, a Canadian film and television producer/director. In 1998 Keogh and her husband David purchased the historic Catharine Parr Traill Mount Ararat property outside Toronto where they currently live.

=== Career ===
Keogh began here career at the CBC, producing national radio programming. In the early 1970s she was part of the famed “radio revolution” and joined the production team that started the long-running This Country in the Morning, hosted by Peter Gzowski. Later Sharon moved to CBC television and produced Three Women, an acclaimed 90 minute documentary music special featuring performers Maureen Forrester, Pauline Julien, and Sylvia Tyson.

In the 1980s Keogh wrote and produced current affairs programming for TVOntario, including the show Options. In the 1980s she became a producer on the dramatic series Some Honourable Gentlemen, a six-part historical feature-length series for CBC-TV. Early in the 1990s Keogh produced the comedy special Together Again, starring Andrea Martin, for the CBC and Showtime.

In 2001 Keogh wrote and produced the ecological television series Down To Earth, profiling remarkable Canadians and the landscapes that inspire them. In 2003, Keogh wrote and produced the performance documentary A Marriage In Music, featuring concert pianist Anton Kuerti and cellist Kristine Boygo, for CBC’s premier arts program, Opening Night. The Globe & Mail called the show “artfully told and a joy to watch”.

=== Activism ===
In Toronto during the 1990s, Keogh was part of the National Round Table on the Environment and the Economy's sustainability initiative, which brought together leading thinkers from across Canada. In 1998 Keogh and her husband moved to Mount Ararat and purchased the Catharine Parr Traill historical property near Gore's Landing, Ontario. Spearheading a lengthy land restoration, Keogh hosted tours with the Royal Ontario Museum, the Field Botanists of Ontario, and the Township of Hamilton Historical Society. Keogh has been a member of the Willow Beach Field Naturalists since 1988.

=== Awards and honours ===
For her land stewardship efforts at Mount Ararat, Keogh was awarded the 2010 Moraine Hero Award as a Landowner Champion, given by the Province of Ontario. In 2012 she received the Paul McGaw Memorial Conservation Award, given by the North American Native Plant Society.
