= Circus International =

- Directed by: Paul Starkman
- Presented by: Al Waxman
- Country of origin: Canada
- Original language: English
- No. of seasons: 1

Production
- Producer: Paul Starkman
- Running time: 60 minutes

Original release
- Network: CBC Television
- Release: 9 October – 13 November 1981

Circus International is a Canadian documentary television miniseries that aired on CBC Television in 1981.

== Premise ==
Episodes followed circus entertainers in situations such as rehearsals. Al Waxman hosted this series. Circus troupes from Moscow and China (Wu Hang) were included in the series coverage.

== Scheduling ==
This hour-long series was broadcast on Fridays at 8:00 p.m. (North American Eastern time) from 9 October to 13 November 1981.
