= Action Autographs =

American television talk show (1949–1950)

Action Autographs is an American television talk show that was broadcast on ABC April 24, 1949 - January 8, 1950.

== Overview ==
Action Autographs used films "to drop in on many interesting people and watch their activities". Episodes included interviews and "human-interest films". Jack Brand was the initial host; Ed Prentiss succeeded him. Topics of episodes included: the Shark Men ("World War II's most incredible combat team"), a four-month hunt for gold, a water show, psychoanalysis of Richard Basehart's character in the film She Walks at Night, and harness racing. Guests on the program included lecturer Burton Holmes, water-skiing champion Willa Worthington, actor Eddie Albert, singer Burl Ives and automobile racer Wilbur Shaw.

== Production ==
Action Autographs was initially broadcast on Sundays from 10 to 10:15 p.m. Eastern Time. Its competition included Girl About Town on NBC and a newscast on CBS. When it returned in 1950, it was seen on Sundays from 6:30 to 6:45 p.m. E. T.

Brand and Marge Bishop produced and directed the series, which was owned by Brand Productions. Bell & Howell was the sponsor in that company's first venture into advertising on TV. The program originated from WENR in Chicago.

== Critical response ==
A review in the trade publication Variety said that children and camera enthusiasts should like the program, which it equated to "a solid commercial" for the sponsor's cameras while acknowledging that the demonstrations of cameras integrated smoothly with the format of the show.
