= Whispering Streets =

American radio romance drama (1952–1960)

Whispering Streets is an American radio romance drama that was broadcast from March 3, 1952, until November 25, 1960, first on ABC and later on CBS.

== Overview ==
Described as a series of "dramas played daily by professionals and laborers — by people who live in mansions — and by those who live across the tracks", TV Radio Mirror magazine wrote in 1955 that each week offered "a new, dramatic story that takes us one step farther down life's path and helps us to understand more fully the whisperings we ourselves hear."

Whispering Streets began as a 20-minute program on weekdays with each episode containing a complete story. From 1956 on, it ran 15 minutes on weekdays, and stories spanned five episodes. Fictional Hope Winslow was the show's hostess and the narrator of each episode. She related the stories as if they had come from her experiences traveling the world as a writer. Actresses who portrayed Winslow included Gertrude Warner, Cathy Lewis, Bette Davis, and Anne Seymour. Jack Fitzmaurice was the announcer.

== Production ==
In 1959, the program moved from ABC to CBS. Ted Lloyd was the producer, with Gordon Hughes and Bruno Zirato Jr. as the directors. Margaret Sangster was the writer. When it was moved in late March 1958 to the 11:05-11:30 a.m. Eastern Time slot, it replaced a radio simulcast of Arthur Godfrey's television program. Its competition included My True Story on NBC.

Sponsors included Bon Ami, Whitney Frozen Foods, Doan's Pills, Union Pharmaceutical, Carnation Evaporated Milk, Friskies dog food, The Toni Company, General Mills, and Seaman Brothers.

When the show debuted, it replaced The Betty Crocker Magazine of the Air on the ABC schedule, with that program moving to another time.

== Critical response ==
A review of the premiere episode in the trade publication Variety called Whispering Streets "a choice hit of femme dialing bait." It said that the narrator "knits the yarn together with finesse" and complimented the actors, the direction and the script.
