= Ernest Howard Culbertson =

American newsreel editor

Ernest Howard Culbertson, also known as E. H. Culbertson and Howard Culbertson, (April 29, 1886, New York – July 1972, New York City) was an American newsreel editor, journalist, playwright, and screenwriter. Educated in Washington D. C., Culbertson began his career working for William Randolph Hearst as a features writer for The Washington Times. A pioneer in newsreel journalism, he was appointed head of the features department for William Fox's newly created Fox News in 1919; the organization that invented the newsreel. He later worked as a newsreel editor for Universal Newsreel. As a dramatist he is best known for the play Goat Alley which was first staged on Broadway in 1921 and later revived in 1927. He also wrote screenplays for films made by Pathé Exchange and Paramount Pictures, and was a writer for the 1937 CBS Radio program Living Dramas of the Bible.

== Early life and education ==
Born Ernest Howard Culbertson, Jr on April 29, 1886, in New York state, the son of Ernest Howard Culbertson, Sr. (1860–1895) and Marie A. Gillmore (b. 1890). His primary school and middle school education took play at Seaton School in Washington D.C. from which he graduated in 1901. He then attended the McKinley Manual Training High School in Washington D.C., where he was a First Sergeant in the United States Navy's Cadet Corps. In 1903, he was the president of the Young Washingtonians' Pleasure Club, an organization for youth in Washington D.C. which put on music and dramatic performances.

== Career ==
=== Journalist and screenwriter ===
After graduating from high school, Culbertson began his career as a writer and journalist working for William Randolph Hearst as a features writer for The Washington Times. His 1910 play Beulah was an adaptation of Augusta Jane Evans Wilson's 1859 novel of the same name. After leaving his position with Hearst, he co-authored the story for the 1918 Pathé Exchange silent film Enemies Within.

In 1919, he was appointed the head of the features department for William Fox's newly created and groundbreaking Fox News, the organization that pioneered the newsreel. He later left that organization to work as an editor for Universal Newsreel and as a screenwriter for Paramount Pictures. He also worked as a features writer for the Los Angeles Evening Post-Record.

=== Goat Alley ===
As a playwright, Culbertson's best known play was Goat Alley; a work whose plot was about African American life in a slum of that name in Washington D.C. A social progressive for his day, Culbertson's play was informed from his past experiences reporting on the Goat Alley neighborhood of Washington D.C. while working for The Washington Times. He wrote articles covering advocacy by the National Civic Federation and other civic action groups attempting to enact reforms in the Goat Alley neighborhood. His play was written as an attempt to raise the visibility of the Goat Alley neighborhood among white communities in order to gain support among voters for welfare, housing, and education programs to assist the improvement of the neighborhood. In keeping with its goals of social and political advocacy, the play was adopted and advocated by the Medical Review of Reviews (MRR).

Goat Alley premiered on Broadway at the Bijou Theatre on June 20, 1921, and was subtitled "Tragedy of Negro Life". The original production was produced by Alice Wade Mulhern of the MRR and directed by Cecil Owen. The play was introduced at its performances by sociologist Dr. Victor Robinson of the MRR who endorsed the work as being of sociological importance, and used Freud's psychology as a means of validating the play. Robinson also introduced government statistics about the Goat Alley neighborhood which at that time had the highest murder rate of any community in the United States. The play was published in Cincinnati in 1922 by Stewart Kidd Company.

Reviews of Goat Alley were mixed at the time of its premiere. George Jean Nathan wrote it was "probably the most acute transcription of the Negro yet made visible in our native dramatic literature." Hubert Harrison ripped the play in The New Republic for faulty dialect and inauthentic portrayal of African American life in D.C. A brief review in The South Atlantic Quarterly was more favorable and credited the play for its realism but concluded the tragic subject matter was heavy. The play was revived on Broadway in 1927.

Goat Alley has left a mixed and complicated legacy when it comes to the issues of race and racism in relation to the American theatre. On the positive side, the work was groundbreaking in that it was the first full-length drama with an all-black cast staged on Broadway. At this period in American theater history there was much racial prejudice against black actors appearing in dramatic roles as their performances in dramas were viewed as inferior to white performers. Given this prevailing racial prejudice, it was common practice for white actors to portray black characters in blackface rather than having black actors in these roles. The New York Times review of Goat Alley was indicative of the racial prejudice of the period and it criticized the work specifically for its decision to cast a serious drama with an all-black cast; arguing that it would have had better acting if had it used white actors in blackface. In this sense, Goat Alley has been praised for its role in challenging racist casting practices and opening the door to black performers in the dramatic repertory.

In spite of this positive achievement and its well-meaning goal of racial uplift, Goat Alley included themes of Social Darwinism which propagated racist stereotypes, and played into the controversial and often negative politics surrounding birth control, eugenics, and the black urban poor during that period of American history.

=== Other works ===
Culbertson 's one-act play The End of the Trail was published in Theatre Arts in 1924. He was a writer for 1937 CBS Radio program Living Dramas of the Bible.

== Death ==
Ernest Howard Culbertson died in July 1972, in New York City, at the age of 86.
