= The Romance of Science =

1960 Canadian television series

- Genre: Docudrama
- Country of origin: Canada
- Original language: English
- No. of seasons: 1
- No. of episodes: 13

Production
- Running time: 30 minutes
- Production company: Niagara Film Productions

Original release
- Network: CBC Television
- Release: 5 June – 28 August 1960

The Romance of Science is a Canadian science docudrama television series that aired on CBC Television in 1960.

== Premise ==
Each episode featured dramatic portrayals of noted scientists. Niagara Film Productions produced the series for CBC Television.

== Scheduling ==
Half-hour episodes were broadcast on Sundays at 5:30 p.m. (Eastern) from 5 June to 28 August 1960.

== Episodes ==
1. 5 June 1960: James Watt and his improvements to steam engine technology
2. 12 June 1960: Michael Faraday discovers electromagnetic induction, starring William Needles
3. John Dalton and his contributions to atomic theory
4. 26 June 1960: Carl Friedrich Gauss and his mathematical works such as statistics
5. 3 July 1960: Physicist Hermann von Helmholtz (Norman Ettlinger) and his development of electrodynamics
6. 10 July 1960: Chemist Antoine Lavoisier (Lloyd Bochner)
7. 17 July 1960: Charles Darwin (Michael Kane), inventor of evolutionary theory
8. 24 July 1960: Gottfried Leibniz and his development of infinitesimal calculus, starring Ivor Barry and Mavor Moore
9. 31 July 1960: Johannes Kepler and his work in mathematics and astronomy
10. 7 August 1960: Carl Linnaeus and his invention of the binary taxonomy of plants
11. 14 August 1960: Engineer and physicist William Thomson, 1st Baron Kelvin
12. 21 August 1960: Inventor and physicist Benjamin Thompson (Count Rumford) and his theories on heat
13. 28 August 1960: Sigmund Freud (Gilles Pelletier) and his development of psychoanalysis
