= The Heatwave Lasted Four Days =

1975 Canadian thriller film

- Directed by: Douglas Jackson
- Written by: Douglas Jackson; Milo Sperber; David Hargreaves
- Produced by: Douglas Jackson
- Starring: Gordon Pinsent; Alexandra Stewart; Lawrence Dane
- Cinematography: Douglas Kiefer
- Edited by: Edward Le Lorrain; Jeanette Lerman
- Music by: Ben Low
- Production company: National Film Board of Canada
- Release date: April 28, 1975
- Running time: 72 minutes
- Country: Canada
- Language: English

The Heatwave Lasted Four Days is a 1975 Canadian thriller drama film, directed by Douglas Jackson. The film stars Gordon Pinsent as Cliff Reynolds, a television news cameraman in Montreal who becomes drawn into the city's criminal underworld after witnessing a heroin deal while filming a news report.

The cast also includes Lawrence Dane, Alexandra Stewart, Domini Blythe, Jon Granik, Al Waxman, and Walter Massey, as well as cameo appearances by real-life CFCF-TV journalists Andrew Marquis and Don McGowan as colleagues of Reynolds.

== Background ==
The film was made as part of the National Film Board of Canada's "Filmglish" series, an experiment in producing films that could function both as commercial entertainment when screened as a feature film, and as educational material when edited into a series of 20 to 30 minute short films to be screened in English as a Second Language classrooms and paired with a lesson on various words and phrases used in the dialogue. The NFB initiated the project after having some success repackaging its 1962 film Drylanders as a set of shorter films for classroom use, and decided in the early 1970s to experiment with making new films that were designed for that dual use from the outset.

Other films in the series included Bernard Devlin's A Case of Eggs, Rudi Dorn's A Moving Experience, John Howe's A Star Is Lost! and Michael Scott's The Winner (Albert la grenouille), although Heatwave was the only one of the five newer films that was relatively well received by critics or audiences.

Jackson noted that one of the key limitations imposed by the educational aspect of the film's mandate was that even though the film was set in Montreal, he was unable to depict any characters speaking with a French Canadian accent.

== Distribution ==
The film premiered on April 28, 1975, as an episode of the ABC late-night anthology Wide World of Entertainment. It was promoted as the first Canadian feature film ever sold to network television in the United States. It received strong ratings in that broadcast, with ABC purchasing rights to rerun it later in the year.

It was later broadcast by CBC Television in Canada on August 10.

== Reception ==
The film was submitted to the 26th Canadian Film Awards. Martin Knelman of The Globe and Mail erroneously listed it as a finalist for Best Motion Picture on October 9, but the paper published a correction a few days later indicating that it was not up for Best Picture, and instead Knelman had omitted the film Lions for Breakfast from his earlier report.
