= Kamouraska (novel) =

Novel by Anne Hébert

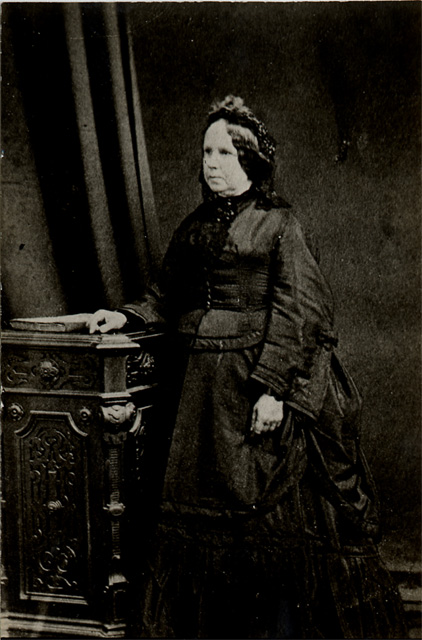
Joséphine-Eléonore d'Estimauville (1816-1893), the historical inspiration for Elisabeth d'Aulnières

Kamouraska (1970) is a historical novel written by Canadian Anne Hébert. Written in French, the book has been translated into many languages.

Set in 19th century Quebec, it tells the story of Elisabeth D’Aulnières, who conspires with her lover, an American doctor, to kill her husband, the seigneur of Kamouraska in the Bas-Saint-Laurent region. The narrative begins with Elisabeth beside the deathbed of her second husband, Jérôme Rolland, a notary. The story is told in a series of flashbacks. The narrative begins in the third person, but later switches to the viewpoint of Elisabeth telling her story in the first person.

The book is used in many schools for the study of novels.

The story is based on events surrounding the 1838 murder of Achille Taché, seigneur of Kamouraska, by George Holmes, an American doctor. He was said to be in love with Taché's wife, Josephte-Joséphine-Eléonore d'Estimauville; Holmes and d'Estimauville were both living in Sorel, Quebec at the time. Holmes fled to the United States to evade the 1839 trial, and d'Estimauville was acquitted by the jury of any role in the killing of her husband.

The book sold 30,000 copies in France in 1970. The book was translated into English by Norman Shapiro, a professor at Wesleyan University.

== Awards ==
The book was nominated for the Prix Femina in 1970, and won the Prix des libraires in 1971.

== Adaptations ==
In 1973 the novel was adapted as a film of the same name directed by Claude Jutra. It starred Geneviève Bujold and Richard Jordan. Jutra and Hébert collaborated on the screenplay. Charles Wilson adapted the book as an opera in three acts, to his own libretto; it was premiered in concert in Toronto in 1979.

== Sources ==
- Brian Busby, Character Parts: Who's Really Who in CanLit (2003) - ISBN 0-676-97579-8
