= Arnold Grimm's Daughter =

American radio soap opera series (1937–1942)

Arnold Grimm's Daughter is an American radio soap opera that was broadcast from July 5, 1937, until June 26, 1942, first on CBS and later on NBC.

== Premise ==
After Connie Grimm eloped with Dallas Tremaine (her childhood sweetheart) her tyrannical father, Arnold, opposed the marriage so much that he disowned Connie, while Dal's mother ("a schemer") "disliked Connie and plotted against her". Connie found second-hand furniture and an old house in which to set up their home while artist Dal never finished the pictures that he began painting. She also provided financial support by operating a business in partnership with French lingerie dealer Madame Babette. At one point Dal took all of the money from Connie's purse and used it on a fling in Chicago. She forgave him when he returned, but he continued to brood over their poverty.

Gladys Grimm was Arnold's wife. Jimmy Kent was a designer and Bill Hartley was Arnold Grimm's business partner. Judy was Connie's outspoken and sometimes funny maid. Mr. Tweedy was a lovable, good man. Sonia Kirkoff was a loyal friend to Connie.

As the series progressed, Connie became pregnant. Before Little Dal was born, Dal died while saving a child from being hit by a fire engine. After her husband's death, Connie's attention turned to helping her father and his struggling business.

== Cast ==
Cast of Arnold Grimm's Daughter
Character	Actor(s)
Connie Grimm Tremaine	Margarette Shanna; Betty Lou Gerson; Luise Barclay
Dal Tremaine	Ed Prentiss; Robert Ellis
Arnold Grimm	Don Merrifield
Sonia Kirkoff	Genelle Gibbs
Madame Babette	Jeanne Juvelier
Jimmy Kent	Frank Dane
Bill Hartley	Verne Smith
Judy	Mento Everett
Dal's mother	Gertrude Bondhill
Dal's father	Orson Brandon
Gladys Grimm	Jeanne Dixon; Bonita Kay
Mr. Tweedy	Butler Mandeville

== Production ==
Arnold Grimm's Daughter began as a local program on WGN radio in Chicago on April 19, 1937. Frank and Anne Hummert produced the series. Margaret Sangster was the writer. W. P. Wright was the production manager. Directors included Wright and Edwin H. Morse was the director. The theme song was "Modern Cinderella".

The program replaced Modern Cinderella when it debuted on CBS. Sponsored by Softasilk, it was broadcast daily at 1:30 p.m. Eastern time from July 5, 1937, until May 27, 1938. It was moved to NBC, where it was broadcast daily at 2:15 p.m. E. T. from May 30, 1938 until March 1941. It was moved to 2:45 p.m. E. T., where it stayed through its last broadcast on June 26, 1942. It was replaced on NBC by Lonely Women.
