= My True Story (radio and TV series) =

American radio and TV dramatic anthology series

My True Story is an American radio dramatic anthology series that ran from February 15, 1943, until February 1, 1962, and was adapted into an American television series that ran from May 5, 1950, until September 22, 1950. Material for episodes of both programs was taken from articles in True Story magazine. Margaret Sangster wrote the scripts for both series.

== Radio ==
The radio version of My True Story was "a confession magazine of the air, with stories of people driven by 'strange, selfish desire'". It ran on the Blue Network and its successor, ABC, until July 1957, when it moved to NBC as ABC ended its live morning dramatic shows. Its final season (1961-1962) was on Mutual.

Initially, Sangster faced "quite a bit of consternation" about the concept of My True Story. She was warned, "It can't possibly succeed in the face of daytime serial competition", with its unusual status of having a complete story each day—no day-to-day cliffhangers and no "overwhelming weekend suspense to interest the audience in a follow-through".

Ted Lloyd was the producer, Martin Andrews and Charles Warburton were the directors, Glenn Riggs was the announcer in the 1940s, and Rosa Rio provided organ music. It was sponsored by Libby, McNeill & Libby and Sterling Drug.

=== Recognition ===
My True Story won the Radio and Television Mirror award for favorite radio daytime program (non-serial) for 1950. In 1958, the American Cancer Society honored the program for educating the public about cancer.

== Television ==
My True Story
- Written by: Margaret Sangster
- Directed by: Charles Powers
- Presented by: Herbert Duncan

Production
- Producer: Charles Powers

Original release
- Network: ABC
- Release: May 5, 1950 – September 22, 1959

Charles Powers produced and directed the TV version of My True Story. Herbert Duncan was the announcer. The series was broadcast on ABC on Fridays, initially from 8:30 to 9 p.m. Eastern Time; in June 1950 it was moved to 8 to 8:30 p.m. E. T. The sustaining series originated from WJZ-TV.

=== Critical response ===
A review in the trade publication Variety described the premiere episode as "a carefully planned, well-rehearsed half hour" but found fault with the script, saying that the story and characters seemed artificial from the beginning. The review complimented the "better-than-usual visual effect" achieved via camera movement and described the production as "smoothly polished".
