= David Acomba =

Canadian film director and producer (born 1944)

- Born: Montreal, Quebec, Canada
- Occupations: Film director; producer
- Years active: 1970–present

David Acomba (born 1944) is a Canadian film producer and director whose television programmes have been featured on CBS, ABC, PBS, CBC, CTV, BBC, Channel 4, Showtime, and HBO.

== Early life and education ==
David Acomba was raised in Montreal, Quebec, and attended Bishop Whelan High School in the suburb of Lachine. In the early 1960s, he attended Northwestern University in Evanston, Illinois, where he majored in Film and Television. In 1967, he attended film school at the University of Southern California at Los Angeles where he received a Master of Performing Arts degree.

== Career in film ==
=== Creative history ===
Acomba moved to Toronto in 1969 and began producing and directing specials for Canada's national network. A musically oriented director, Acomba began in 1969 by directing a television special for the Canadian Broadcasting Corporation, Mariposa: A Folk Festival, with Joan Baez and Joni Mitchell. He then directed the first U.S. television network rock special for PBS (NET), Welcome To The Fillmore East, with Van Morrison, Albert King and The Byrds.

In 1973, he won the Canadian Film Award for Best Direction for his feature film Slipstream, about a popular disk jockey's struggle for personal and professional integrity, with music by Eric Clapton and Van Morrison. In the autumn of 1974, he was asked to film George Harrison's North American Dark Horse Tour.

In 1978, he was chosen by George Lucas to direct the CBS Star Wars Holiday Special. He was a classmate of George Lucas at USC film school. Acomba, used to substantial artistic control as a film director, felt there was a wide creative divide between himself and the shows television producers. He chose to leave the project after finishing a few scenes, including the Mos Eisley cantina musical number and Jefferson Starship. During the subsequent prescheduled pause in shooting he was replaced by Steve Binder.

In 1980, he directed the feature-length drama/performance film Hank Williams: The Show He Never Gave. The movie was screened at TIFF, the London Film Festival, Filmex in Los Angeles, and featured on HBO. It was also screened at a TIFF retrospective in 2017.

In the early 1980s, Acomba pioneered television skating specials with Strawberry Ice for the CBC. The format combined visual story telling utilizing ground breaking visual effects with Olympic level skating choreography. The production won many international awards and was shown in over 45 countries. This success led to his producing and directing the Magic Skates special for Mace Neufeld and ABC.

In 1985, he began to work in comedy with Four on the Floor, a sketch series for the CBC also shown on Showtime and the BBC, as well as in over 20 other countries. His other comedy programmes in the late eighties included a special for Showtime with Andrea Martin and a Second City pilot for CBS late night with, among others, Mike Myers. In the early nineties, Acomba directed three seasons of the Canadian comedy series CODCO starring Andy Jones, Tommy Sexton, Mary Walsh, Cathy Jones and Greg Malone.

Interested in utilizing television to promote awareness of the environment, Acomba directed and co-produced two seasons of the documentary ecology series Down To Earth, which featured remarkable Canadians and the landscapes that inspire them.

In 2003, Acomba directed the performance documentary A Marriage In Music featuring concert pianist Anton Kuerti and cellist Kristine Boygo for CBC's premier arts program, Opening Night. The Globe & Mail reported that the work was "artfully told and a joy to watch".

In 2007, 33 years after initial filming, Acomba revisited his original director's cut of George Harrison's 1974 Dark Horse Tour with Billy Preston, Tom Scott and Ravi Shankar. Because George lost his voice for most of the tour the film was never released. This new cut is a portrait of the first Beatle to tour North America on his own. The film captures Harrison's prescient world music vision as he brought together the eastern music of Ravi Shankar with western rock and jazz. The movie, which has never been screened publicly, includes cameo appearances by John Lennon and Paul McCartney as well as rock promoter Bill Graham. This new director's version has been placed in the Harrison archive.

In 2008, he wrote and directed the short film ANTON & the PIANO for the National Film Board of Canada.

== Personal life ==
Acomba met his wife Sharon Keogh, a Canadian radio and television producer, in 1970. In 1999, they purchased the historic Catharine Parr Traill Mount Ararat property outside Toronto. In 2015 they moved to Cobourg, Ontario where they now live.

Over the years he has designed several country houses for himself and friends. His last design, a modern town house near Lake Ontario, was featured in the Toronto Star and illustrates the similarities between film making and the process of architecture.

== Awards and honors ==
Acomba's dramatic films have been shown at the London, Los Angeles and Toronto film festivals. In Canada he received awards for Best Director at the Canadian Film Awards and the Yorkton Film Festival. In the US, he has received the Golden Gate Award for Best Entertainment Program, an International Emmy and several Ace nominations. Acomba has been invited to lecture at York University, Trent University and Ryerson University (now Toronto Metropolitan University).

== Activism ==
David Acomba is founder and formerly the executive director of the All-Canadian Jazz Festival Port Hope in Port Hope, Ontario. In 2006, he and his wife began working on the establishment of a Catharine Parr Traill Land Trust. Their efforts are concerned with land restoration on the Mount Ararat homestead outside Gore's Landing, Ontario and the promotion of Mrs. Traill's important early Canadian botanical work.
