= Douglas Jackson (filmmaker) =

Canadian film director

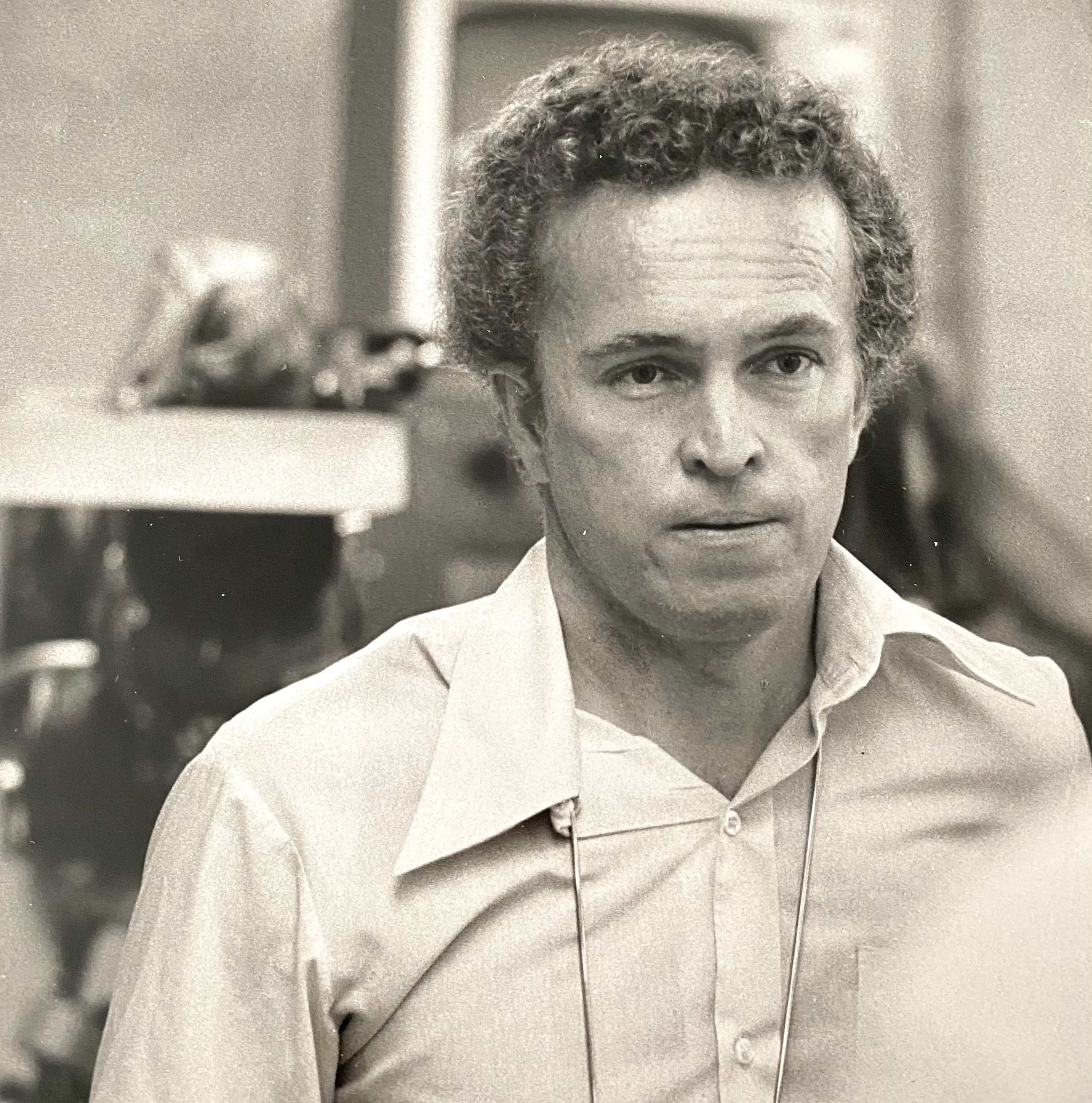
- Born: January 26, 1940 (age 86); Montreal, Quebec, Canada
- Occupations: Director, producer, scriptwriter
- Years active: 1964–present
- Spouse: Tanya Jackson

Douglas Jackson (born January 26, 1940) is a Canadian film and television director and producer. As a television director, he is best known for the 1983 CBC Television miniseries Empire, Inc., which he co-directed with Denys Arcand. Jackson began his film career in the 1960s on staff at the National Film Board of Canada (NFB). His NFB credits include producing Bill Mason's short documentary Blake, which was nominated for an Academy Award for Best Live Action Short Film.

== Filmography ==
- The Sloane Affair (1973)
- The Heatwave Lasted Four Days (1974)
- Empire, Inc. (1983)
- The Front Line (1985)
- Whispers (1990)
- Deadbolt (1992)
- The Paperboy (1994)
- The Wrong Woman (1995)
- Midnight in Saint Petersburg (1996)
- Natural Enemy (1996)
- Twists of Terror (1997)
- Random Encounter (1998)
- Dead End (1998)
- Requiem for Murder (1999)
- The Witness Files (1999)
- Someone Is Watching (2000)
- The Ghost (2001)
- Nowhere in Sight (2001)
- Aftermath (2002)
- Saving Emily (2004)
- Stranger at the Door (2004)
- Her Perfect Spouse (2004)
- A Lover's Revenge (2005)
- A Killer Upstairs (2005)
- The Perfect Neighbor (2005)
- The Rival (2006)
- The Perfect Marriage (2006)
- Maid of Honor (2006)
- My Daughter's Secret (2007)
- Christie's Revenge (2007)
- Framed for Murder (2007)
- Dead at 17 (2008)
- Her Only Child (2008)
- The Perfect Assistant (2008)
- My Nanny's Secret (2009)
