= Ed Prentiss =

American actor (1908–1992)

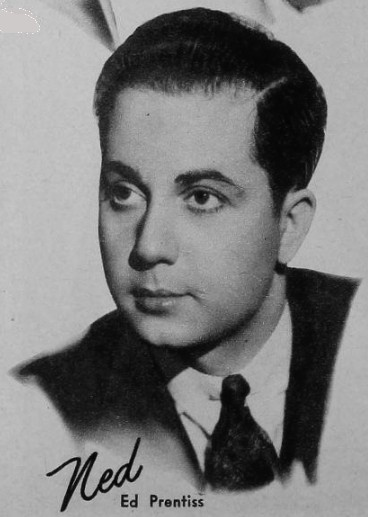
- Ed Prentiss is pictured in his role of Ned in the radio soap opera The Guiding Light.
- Born: Paul Edward Prentiss; September 9, 1908; Chicago, Illinois, US
- Died: March 19, 1992 (aged 83)
- Education: University of Iowa
- Occupation: Actor
- Spouse: Ivah Davidson (1941-?)
- Children: 1 son

Paul Edward Prentiss (September 9, 1908 – March 19, 1992) was an American actor in the era of old-time radio. He was perhaps best known for portraying the title role on the radio version of Captain Midnight.

== Early years ==
Prentiss was born in Chicago, Illinois. He attended the University of Iowa.

== Radio ==
Radio historian Jim Harmon noted, in his book The Great Radio Heroes, "Ed Prentiss was not the first actor to play Captain Midnight, contrary to some published reports." After Bill Bouchey had the role in the program's second season, Prentiss auditioned for the third season, got the part, and continued as Captain Midnight for seven years.

On The Guiding Light soap opera, Prentiss played Ned (a "neglected youth") and was the program's "omniscient host." Beginning in 1943, Prentiss was narrator for an hour-long block consisting of three soap operas: Today's Children, The Guiding Light and Woman in White. The three programs had interconnecting story lines, with Prentiss's narration "introducing each program segment and linking all three together."

Prentiss's other roles on radio programs included those shown in the table below.

Program	Role
Armstrong of the SBI	Announcer
The First Nighter Program	Host
Jack Armstrong, the All-American Boy	Announcer
Johnny Lujack of Notre Dame	Lujack's sidekick
Silver Eagle	Narrator
Sweet River	Minister
A Tale of Today	Michael Denby

Prentiss had his own syndicated program, This Is The Story. An ad for the 15-minute program described it as follows: "Ed Prentiss, America's greatest story teller ... offers true and unusual tales, each with a surprisingly different ending."

He also was a regular on Arnold Grimm's Daughter, Painted Dreams, Bud Barton, The Romance of Helen Trent, Springtime and Harvest and Holland Housewarming.

== Film ==
Prentiss appeared in Westbound (1959) and The FBI Story (1959).

== Television ==
Prentiss played Dr. Snyder on As the World Turns. He was one of the hosts of Action Autographs, was the host for Majority Rules.. He played Edward Elliott on Morning Star and Mr. Bailey on Leave It to Beaver. He also was the announcer for That's O'Toole. He also played roles in various TV Westerns of the late 1950s-early '60s, often as a sheriff. He is easily recognized by his voice, as well as his physical appearance. In 1957 Prentiss appeared on the TV western Cheyenne in the episode titled "Top Hand," appearing as the character Bob Gentry.

Prentiss appeared on Perry Mason, "The Case of the Badgered Brother" (season 7, episode 12) as the recorded voice reading a will in Mason's office.

== Personal life ==
Prentiss married Ivah Davidson on November 21, 1941. They had a son, born September 14, 1943.

== Filmography ==
Year	Title	Role	Notes
1957	Cheyenne	Ben Gentry	Episode: Top Hand
1958	Violent Road	Mr. Nelson	
1958	Home Before Dark	Dr. Collins	Uncredited
1959	Westbound	James Fuller - U.S. Post Office	Uncredited
1959	The FBI Story	U.S. Marshal	
1959	Beloved Infidel	Attendee at Preview	Uncredited
1960	Wanted Dead or Alive (TV series)	Sheriff Truxton	Episode: Mental Lapse
1960	Man on a String	Adrian Benson	
1960	The Crowded Sky	Joseph Bruce aka J.B.	Uncredited
1960	Sunrise at Campobello	Barker	Uncredited
1961	A Fever in the Blood	Convention Chairman	Uncredited
1961	Ada	Clergyman at Legislative Meeting	Uncredited
1961	The Children's Hour	Head of Hospital	Uncredited
1961	Lover Come Back	Zachary, Ad Council Member	Uncredited
1961	The Outsider	Speaker	Uncredited
1962	Leave it to Beaver	Mr. Bailey	Episode: Beaver’s Typewriter
1963	A Gathering of Eagles	Duty Controller	
1963	Wall of Noise	Paddock Steward	
1963	Leave it to Beaver	Mr. Bailey	Episode: The Clothing Drive
1964	One Man's Way	Mr. Boardman	
1964	Kisses for My President	Max Kloch	Uncredited
1964	Quick, Before It Melts	Dentist in Antarctica	Uncredited
1967	Eight on the Lam	Minister	Uncredited
1968	Project X	Hicks	
1968	The Virginian (TV series)	Carl Jensen	saison 7 episode 6 (Image of an outlaw)
1969	The Virginian (TV series)	Dave Owens	saison 7 épisode 16 (Last grave at socorro creek)
1971	The Barefoot Executive	Harry - Justice Dept. Man	
1971	The Marriage of a Young Stockbroker	Mr. Franklin	
