= Camille Bernard =

Canadian opera singer, actress and music educator

Camille Bernard CM
- Born: February 25, 1898; Quebec, Canada
- Died: July 16, 1984 (aged 86); Montreal, Quebec, Canada
- Occupations: Opera singer; actress; music educator
- Known for: Founding the Institut Camille-Bernard
- Awards: Member of the Order of Canada (1981); Canadian Film Award for Best Supporting Actress (1973)

Camille Bernard CM (February 25, 1898 – July 16, 1984) was a Canadian opera singer, actress and music educator from Quebec. She was most noted as the founder of the Institut Camille-Bernard, a prominent theatre and music school in Montreal.

Trained under Béatrice La Palme and Salvator Issaurel, she was a regular performer in Quebec until being invited in 1924 to study in Paris. Completing her training under Pauline Donalda and Yvette Guilbert, and regularly performed in both France and Canada for a number of years thereafter.

In 1929, she founded the Théâtre des petits, a children's school of diction, and later founded the École nouvelle, a school for children with language difficulties; the two institutions later merged into the Institut Camille-Bernard. The Théâtre des petits also had a regular radio program on Montreal's CKAC.

In 1973, she had her only major acting role, in Claude Jutra's film Kamouraska. She won the Canadian Film Award for Best Supporting Actress.

She was inducted into the Order of Canada in 1981.
