= Kamouraska (film) =

- Film poster
- Directed by: Claude Jutra
- Written by: Claude Jutra
- Screenplay by: Anne Hébert
- Produced by: Mag Bodard; Pierre Lamy
- Starring: Geneviève Bujold; Richard Jordan; Philippe Léotard
- Cinematography: Michel Brault
- Edited by: Renée Lichtig
- Music by: Maurice Leroux
- Production company: France Cinéma Productions
- Distributed by: New Line Cinema
- Release date: March 29, 1973 (Canada)
- Running time: 124 minutes
- Countries: Canada; France
- Languages: English; French
- Budget: $905,000

Kamouraska is a 1973 French-Canadian film directed and written by Claude Jutra, based on the 1970 novel of the same name by Anne Hébert. At the time of its release it was the most expensive film ever made in Canadian history. It won four Canadian Film Awards, but was unsuccessful at the box office.

== Plot ==
The film is set in rural Québec in the 1830s. Élisabeth at the deathbed of her second husband, Jérôme Rolland, is recounting her past, which is conveyed through a series of flashbacks. She was first married to Antoine, the brutish seigneur of Kamouraska, and fell in love with a Loyalist American doctor, Georges Nelson. He murdered Antoine. At her trial for complicity in the killing, Élisabeth is acquitted. She marries Jérôme to save her honour.

== Cast ==
- Geneviève Bujold as Élisabeth d'Aulnières
- Richard Jordan as Georges Nelson
- Philippe Léotard as Antoine Tassy
- Marcel Cuvelier as Jérôme Rolland
- Huguette Oligny as The Mother of Élisabeth
- Camille Bernard as The Mother of Antoine
- Janine Sutto as Tante
- Olivette Thibault as Tante
- Marie Fresnières as Tante
- Suzie Baillargeon as Aurélie
- Colette Cortois as Florida
- Gigi Duckett as Anne-Marie
- Marcel Marineau as Greffier, Médecin
- Len Watt as Le Gouverneur

== Production ==
Claude Jutra agreed to direct the film on the condition that Geneviève Bujold played the lead role.

The film based on Anne Hébert's novel was directed and written by Jutra and Michel Brault was the directory of cinematography. The French-Canadian co-production was shot from 1–29 March and 26 April to 30 June 1972. Three hours and forty minutes worth of footage was shot for the film.

The film had a budget of $750,000, but cost $905,000 (equivalent to $6,785,434 in 2025) to make. 75% of the funding came from Canada and 25% came from France. It was the most expensive film made in Canada at that point.

Jutra's first cut of the film was three hours and forty minutes long and his second cut was two hours and thirty minutes long. Renée Lichtig replaced him as editor and Jutra praised her work.

== Release ==
The film was previewed in Kamouraska, Quebec, and premiered at Théâtre Saint-Denis in Montreal on 29 March 1973. It was distributed by France Film in Quebec and New Line Cinema in Europe. The Death of a Lumberjack was selected over Kamouraska as Canada's submission to the 1973 Cannes Film Festival, but was shown at Cannes through a special screening by the French Association of Film Critics. It was the first time the organization held a special screening since its showing of Hiroshima mon amour in 1959.

The television rights to the film were sold to the Canadian Broadcasting Corporation for $100,000, the highest amount for a Canadian film at that time. It was shown by the CBC on 6 September 1980. The theatrical version of the film was 124 minutes while the 1983 television version was 173 minutes.

== Reception ==
The film was unsuccessful at the box office. The film was poorly reviewed by critics. Henry Herx gave it a mixed review in his Family Guide to Movies on Video: "[T]he movie captures a vanished era, has excellent acting and the beauty of its settings[,] but its story of hot passion in a cold climate is heavily melodramatic." Vincent Canby, writing in The New York Times, stated that the actors were not "able to give emotional urgency to material that depends so heavily on our believing in these characters and sharing their sense of sin and guilt".

The film won multiple awards at the Canadian Film Awards, but Bujold was the only person from Quebec to accept an award.

== Accolades ==
Award	Date of ceremony	Category	Recipient(s)	Result	Ref.
Canadian Film Awards	12 October 1973	Special Jury Prize	Kamouraska	Won	
Canadian Film Awards	12 October 1973	Best Actress	Geneviève Bujold	Won	
Canadian Film Awards	12 October 1973	Best Supporting Actress	Camille Bernard	Won	
Canadian Film Awards	12 October 1973	Best Art Direction	François Barbeau	Won	

== Works cited ==
- Hofsess, John (1975). Inner Views: Ten Canadian Film-Makers. McGraw Hill Education. ISBN 0-07-082190-9.
- Topalovich, Maria (1984). A Pictorial History of The Canadian Film Awards. Stoddart Publishing. ISBN 0-7737-2036-7.
- Marshall, Bill (2001). Quebec National Cinema. McGill–Queen's University Press. ISBN 0-7735-2103-8.
- Turner, D. John, ed. (1987). Canadian Feature Film Index: 1913-1985. Canadian Film Institute. ISBN 0660533642.
- Pallister, Janis (1995). The Cinema of Quebec: Masters in Their Own House. Associated University Presses. ISBN 0838635628.
