= Paperback Hero (1973 film) =

Paperback Hero (Last of the Big Guns)
- Directed by: Peter Pearson
- Written by: Barry Pearson; Les Rose
- Produced by: John F. Bassett; James Margellos
- Starring: Keir Dullea; Elizabeth Ashley; John Beck; George R. Robertson; Dayle Haddon
- Cinematography: Donald Wilder
- Edited by: Kirk Jones
- Music by: Ron Collier
- Production company: Agincourt International
- Release date: September 21, 1973 (Canada)
- Running time: 93 minutes
- Country: Canada
- Language: English
- Budget: C$500,000
- Box office: $700,000 (Canada)

Paperback Hero is a 1973 Canadian film, directed by Peter Pearson, which starred Keir Dullea and Elizabeth Ashley. It is set in Saskatchewan and portrays the life of a big-fish minor-league hockey player in a little-pond town. The movie was filmed in Delisle, Saskatchewan.

It was originally titled Last of the Big Guns, but was renamed to reflect the lyrics of Gordon Lightfoot's "If You Could Read My Mind", which was featured on the soundtrack.

It won the Canadian Film Awards in 1973 for Film Editing, Overall Sound, and Cinematography.

It was later screened at the 1984 Festival of Festivals as part of Front & Centre, a special retrospective program of artistically and culturally significant films from throughout the history of Canadian cinema. It was selected in 2006 for TIFF's Canadian Open Vault program, which preserves examples of notable Canadian cinema.

== See also ==
- List of films about ice hockey
