= Canada in the Cold War =

Canada in the Cold War era
- 1946–1991 (Note: The origins of the Cold War, and when it began is a subject of academic debate. However, the Gouzenko affair has been used by Canadian historians to mark the beginning of the Cold War in Canada.)
| World Wars and Interwar era | Post-Cold War era |
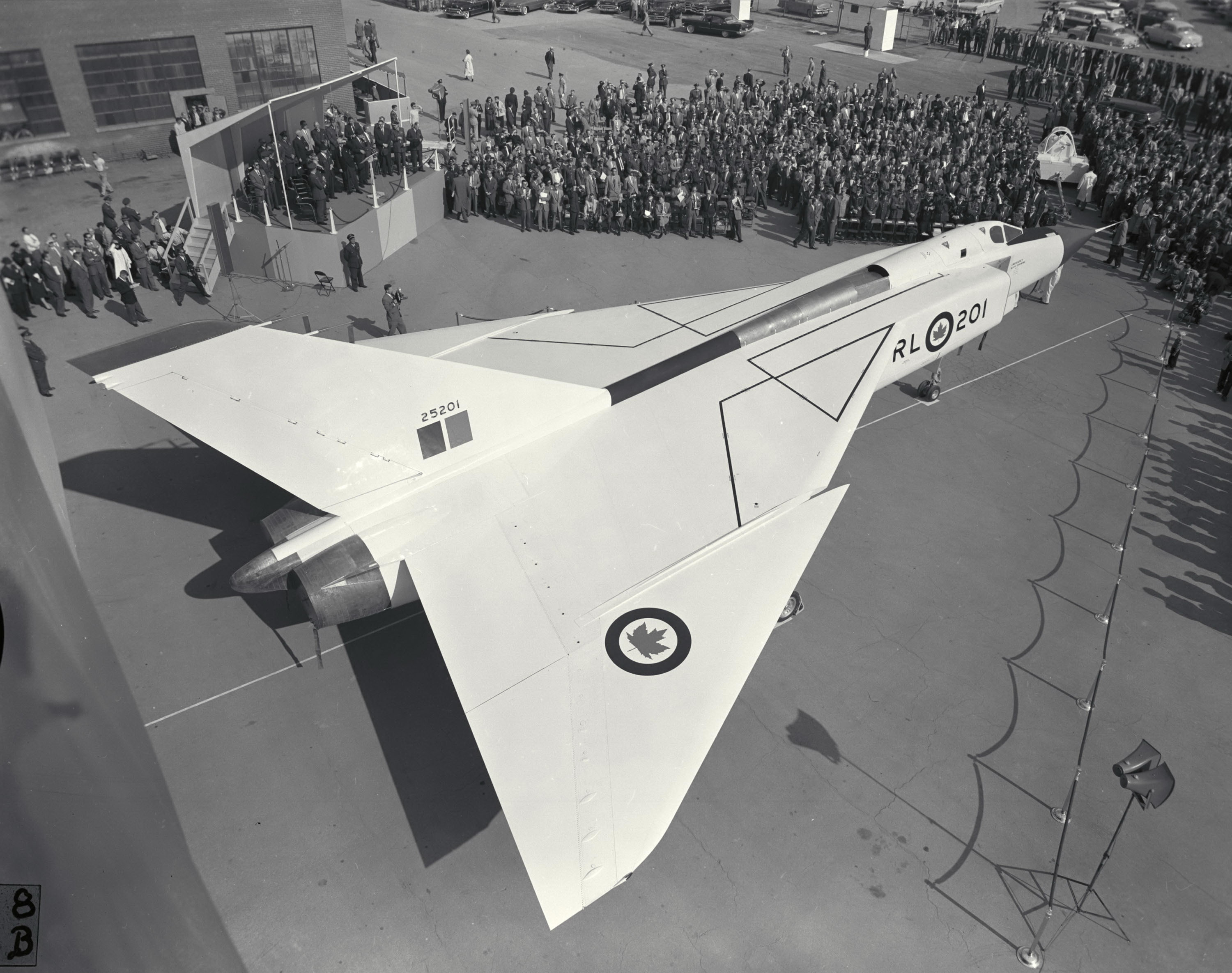
- Roll-out for the Avro Arrow in October 1957
- Including: 1945–60, 1960–81, 1982–92
- Leader(s): W. L. Mackenzie King; Louis St. Laurent; John Diefenbaker; Lester B. Pearson; Pierre Trudeau; Joe Clark; John Turner; Brian Mulroney

During the Cold War, Canada was one of the western powers playing a central role in the major alliances. It was an ally of the United States, but there were several foreign policy differences between the two countries over the course of the Cold War. Canada's peacekeeping role during the Cold War has played a major role in its positive global image. The country served in every UN peacekeeping effort from its inception in 1948 until 1989. This resulted in Canada providing the greatest amount of UN peacekeepers during the Cold War.

Canada was a founding member of the North Atlantic Treaty Organization (NATO) in 1949, the North American Aerospace Defence Command (NORAD) in 1958, and played a leading role in United Nations peacekeeping operations—from the Korean War to the creation of a permanent UN peacekeeping force during the Suez Crisis in 1956. Subsequent peacekeeping interventions occurred in the Congo (1960), Cyprus (1964), the Sinai (1973), Vietnam (with the International Control Commission), Golan Heights, Lebanon (1978), and Namibia (1989–1990).

Canada did not follow the American lead in all Cold War actions, sometimes resulting in tensions between the two countries. For instance, Canada refused to join the Vietnam War; in 1984, the last nuclear weapons based in Canada were removed; diplomatic relations were maintained with Cuba; and the Canadian government recognized the People's Republic of China before the United States.

The Canadian military maintained a standing presence in Western Europe as part of its NATO deployment at several bases in Germany—including long tenures at CFB Baden-Soellingen and CFB Lahr, in the Black Forest region of West Germany. Also, Canadian military facilities were maintained in Bermuda, France, and the United Kingdom. From the early 1960s until the 1980s, Canada maintained weapon platforms armed with nuclear weapons—including nuclear-tipped air-to-air rockets, surface-to-air missiles, and high-yield gravity bombs principally deployed in the Western European theatre of operations as well as in Canada.

== Background ==
Canada emerged from the Second World War as a world power, radically transforming a principally agricultural and rural dominion of a dying empire into a truly sovereign nation, with a market economy focused on a combination of resource extraction and refinement, heavy manufacturing, and high-technology research and development. As a consequence of supplying so much of the war effort for six long years, Canada's military grew to an exceptional size: over a million service personnel, the world's fifth largest surface fleet and fourth largest air force. Despite a draw-down at the end of the war, the Canadian military nonetheless executed Operation Muskox, a massive deployment across the Canadian Arctic designed in part to train for a ground and air war in the region. Canadians also assisted in humanitarian efforts, and sent observers for the United Nations to India and Palestine in 1947 and 1948.

There was never any doubt early on as to which side Canada was on in the Cold War due to its location and historical alliances. On the domestic front, the Canadian state at all levels fought vehemently against what it characterized as communist subversion. Canadian and business leaders opposed the advance of the labour movement on the grounds that it was a Bolshevik conspiracy during the interwar period. The peak moments of this effort were the Winnipeg General Strike of 1919 and the anticommunist campaigns of the depression, including the stopping of the On-to-Ottawa Trek. Canada, along with other major, Allied Powers convened at the Yalta Conference in 1945 to discuss the reorganization of Europe, laying the groundwork for a new Europe.

== Early Cold War (1946–1960) ==
In February 1946, the Canadian government disclosed to the public the defection of a Soviet cipher clerk, Igor Gouzenko, in Ottawa; who also disclosed the existence of a Soviet spy ring in the country. The event has been used by historians to mark the beginning of the Cold War era in Canada, with the Gouzenko Affair triggering another red scare in Canada.

Canada was a founding member of NATO (North Atlantic Treaty Organization), of which Prime Minister Louis St. Laurent was a chief architect. Canada was one of its most ardent supporters and pushed (largely unsuccessfully) to have it become an economic and cultural organization in addition to a military alliance.

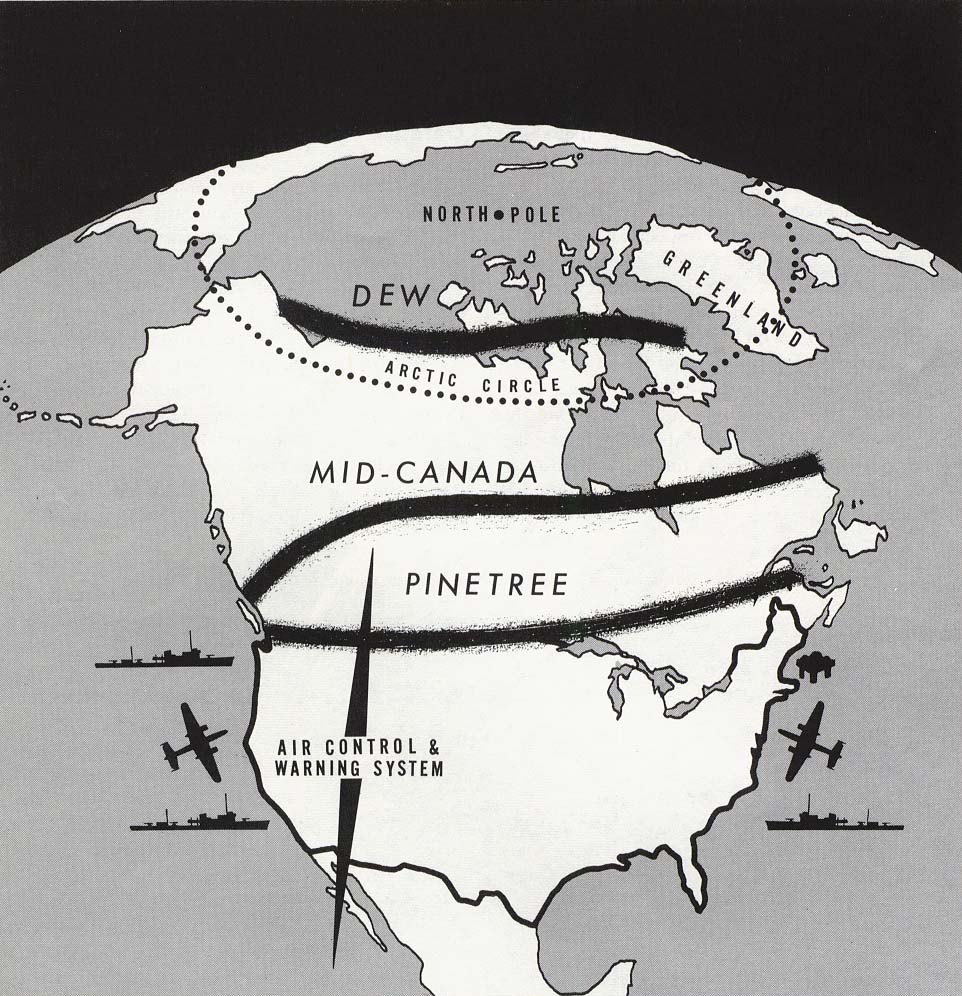
A map depicting the location for the Dew Line, the Mid-Canada Line, and the Pinetree Line, a series of early warning radar systems developed in the 1950s.

To defend North America against a possible enemy attack, Canada and the United States began to work very closely together in the 1950s. The North American Aerospace Defense Command (NORAD) created a joint air-defence system. In northern Canada, the Distant Early Warning Line (or Dew Line) was established to give warning of Soviet bombers heading over the north pole. Similar early warning radar systems were also developed in the middle of Canada, known as the Mid-Canada Line; and across the 50th parallel north, known as the Pinetree Line.

=== Domestic anti-Communism ===
Canada addressed the threat posed by Communist sympathizers in a manner more moderate than in the United States. The United States wished the Canadian government would go further, asking for a purge of trade unions, but the Canadian government left the purge of trade unions to the AFL–CIO. The American officials were especially concerned about the sailors on Great Lakes freight vessels, and, in 1951, Canada added them to those already screened by its secret anti-communist screening program. The Communist Party of Canada had not been outlawed since Section 98, which was repealed by Prime Minister William Lyon Mackenzie King in 1935.

Despite its comparatively moderate stance towards Communism, the Canadian state continued intensive surveillance of Communists and sharing of intelligence with the United States. PROFUNC was a Government of Canada top secret plan to identify and detain Communist sympathizers during the height of the Cold War.

Tensions between Canada and the United States heightened during this time as on April 4, 1957, Canadian Ambassador to Egypt, E. Herbert Norman, leaped to his death from a Cairo building after the United States Senate Subcommittee on Internal Security released a textual record of a previous hearing to the media. Despite having been cleared several years earlier—first by the RCMP in 1950, then again by the Canadian Minister of External Affairs, Lester B. Pearson (later Prime Minister)—the American media portrayed Norman as a spy and traitor. The only evidence the United States had was that as a student at Cambridge and Harvard he was a part of a Marxist communist study group. This made Pearson, who was still External Affairs Minister, backed by outrage across the country, send a note to the U.S. Government, threatening to offer no more security information on Canadian citizens until it was guaranteed that this information would not slip beyond the executive branch of the government.

=== Peacekeeping ===
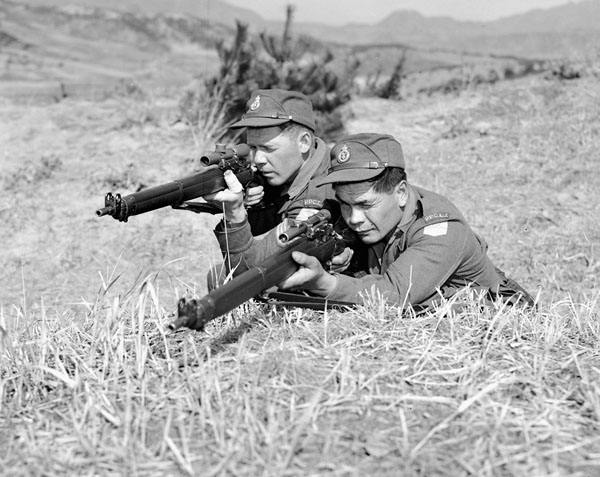
Two snipers of the Princess Patricia's Canadian Light Infantry in Korea during the Korean War.

It was during the Cold War period that Canada began to assert the international clout that went along with the reputation it had built on the international stage in World War I and World War II.

In the Korean War, the moderately sized contingent of volunteer soldiers from Canada made noteworthy contributions to the United Nations forces and served with distinction. Of particular note is the Princess Patricia's Canadian Light Infantry's contribution to the Battle of Kapyong.

Canada's major Cold War contribution to international politics was made in the innovation and implementation of 'Peacekeeping'. Although a United Nations military force had been proposed and advocated for the preservation of peace vis a vis the U.N.'s mandate by Canada's representatives Prime Minister Mackenzie King and his Secretary of State for External Affairs Louis St. Laurent at the United Nations Conference on International Organization in San Francisco in June 1945, it was not adopted at that time. During the Suez Crisis of 1956, the idea promoted by Canada in 1945 of a United Nations military force returned to the fore. The conflict involving Britain, France, Israel and Egypt quickly developed into a potential flashpoint between the emerging 'superpowers' of the United States and the Soviet Union as the Soviets made intimations that they would militarily support Egypt's cause. The Soviets went as far as to say they would be willing to use "all types of modern weapons of destruction" on London and Paris—an overt threat of nuclear attack. Canadian diplomat Lester B. Pearson re-introduced then-Prime Minister Louis St. Laurent's UN military force concept in the form of an 'Emergency Force' that would intercede and divide the combatants, and form a buffer zone or 'human shield' between the opposing forces. Pearson's United Nations Emergency Force (UNEF), the first peacekeeping force, was deployed to separate the combatants, and enforce a ceasefire and resolution that was drawn up to end the hostilities.

== Canada–U.S. tensions (1961–1980) ==
=== Diefenbaker and the Missile Crisis (1961–1963) ===
Great debate broke out while John Diefenbaker was Prime Minister as to whether Canada should accept U.S. nuclear weapons on its territory. Diefenbaker had already agreed to buy the BOMARC missile system from the Americans, which would be not as effective without nuclear warheads, but balked at permitting the weapons into Canada.

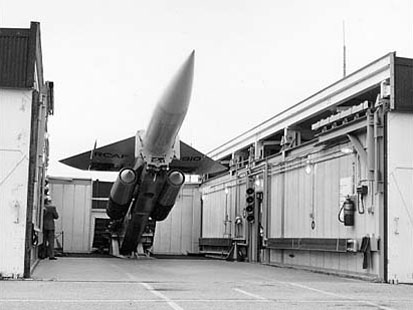
A RCAF CIM-10 Bomarc missile in North Bay, Ontario. Viewed as an alternative to the defunct Avro Arrow program, its adoption garnered controversy given its nuclear payload.

Canada also maintained diplomatic and economic ties with Cuba following the Cuban Revolution. Prior to the 1962 Cuban Missile Crisis, the insistence on a much more placated policy towards the Cuban government had been a source of contention between the United States and Canada. Diefenbaker firmly stood by his policy decision, insisting that this was the result of the rights of states to establish their own forms of government, rejection of current US interpretation of the Monroe Doctrine as well as Canada's right to establish its own foreign policy. Concern in the Canadian government was focused primarily on nuclear weapons, many politicians in the opposition and in power believed that as long as the US president retained absolute control of the nuclear weapons, Canadian forces could be ordered to undertake nuclear missions for the US without Canadian consent.

During the Cuban Missile Crisis in 1962, Canada was expected to fall in line with American foreign policy, in that Canada's military forces were expected to go on immediate war alert status. Diefenbaker however, refused to do so emphasizing the need for United Nations intervention. It would only be after a tense phone call between President John F. Kennedy and Diefenbaker that Canada's armed forces would begin preparations for "immediate enemy attack."

Although the crisis would eventually be solved by diplomatic talks between Nikita Khrushchev and Kennedy, nothing would loom larger over the Canadian state in the months following the crisis than the governing party's disarray on the question of nuclear arms.

=== Pearson and Trudeau (1963–1984) ===
In the 1963 Canadian election, Diefenbaker was replaced by the famed diplomat Lester B. Pearson, who accepted the warheads. Further tensions developed when Pearson criticized the American role in the Vietnam War in a speech he gave at Temple University in Philadelphia, Pennsylvania. (Also of note: In 1968, Canada's three separate armed services were unified into the Canadian Armed Forces.)

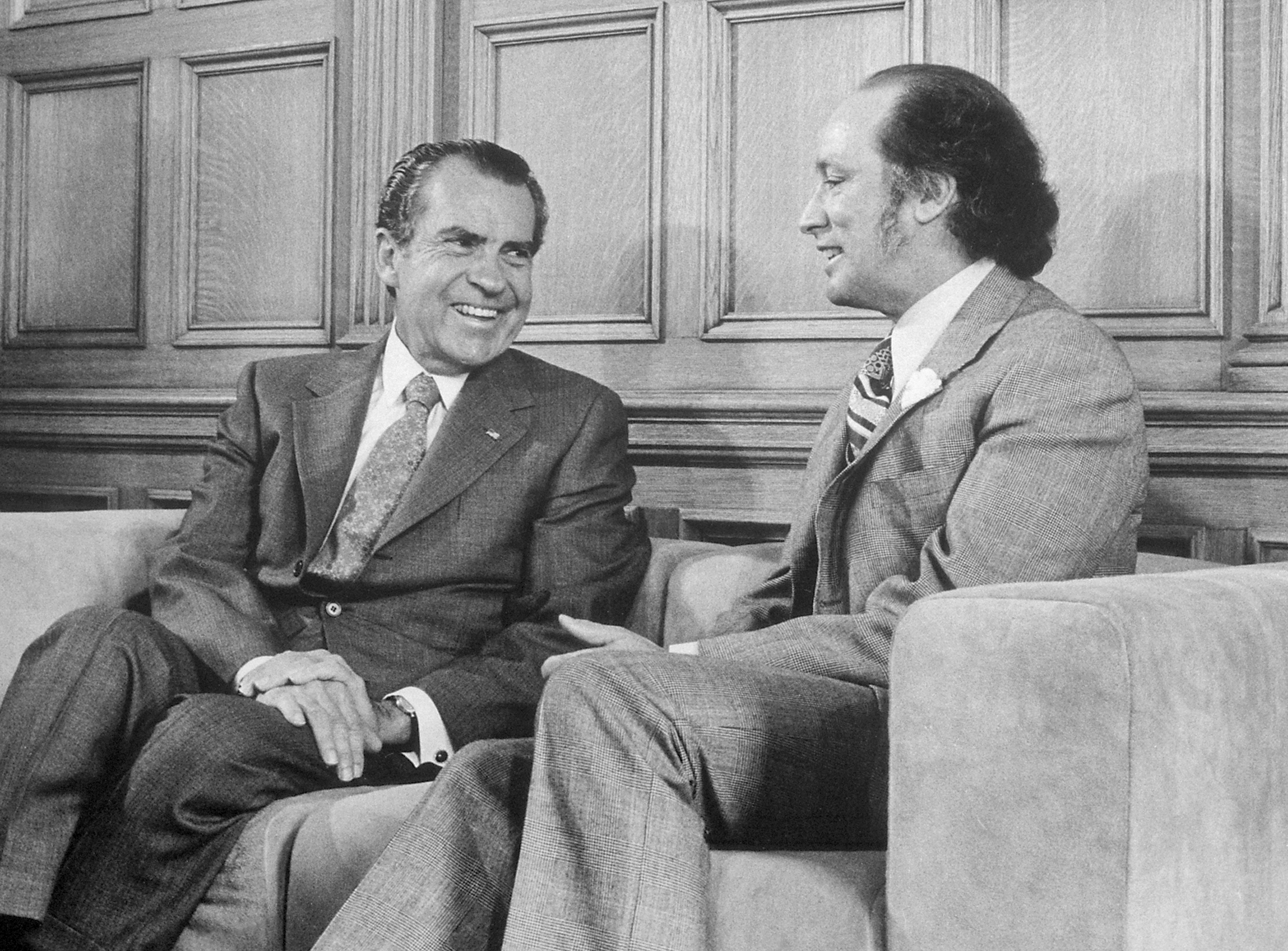
Canadian Prime Minister Pierre Trudeau and U.S. President Richard Nixon in Ottawa, 1972.

Shortly after the implementation of economic policies and tariffs in 1971, known as the Nixon shock, the Canadian government began to articulate a Third Option policy; with plans to diversify Canadian trade and to downgrade the importance of its relationship with the United States. In a 1972 speech in Ottawa, Nixon declared the "special relationship" between Canada and the United States dead.

During this period, Canada played a middle power role in international affairs, and pursued diplomatic relations with Communist countries that the US had severed ties with, such as Cuba and Red China after their respective revolutions. (The latter was not internationally recognized at the time.) Canada argued that rather than being soft on Communism, it was pursuing a strategy of "constructive engagement" whereby it sought to influence Communism through the course of its international relationships.

Canada also refused to join the Organization of American States, disliking the support and tolerance of the Cold War OAS for dictators. Under Pearson's successor, Prime Minister Pierre Trudeau, U.S.-Canadian policies grew further apart. Trudeau removed nuclear weapons from Canadian soil, formally recognized the People's Republic of China, established a personal friendship with Cuban leader Fidel Castro, and decreased the number of Canadian troops stationed at NATO bases in Europe.

In addition, Canada may have played a small role in helping to bring about glasnost and perestroika. In the mid-1970s, Alexander Yakovlev was appointed as ambassador to Canada, remaining at that post for a decade. During this time, he and Trudeau became close friends.

== Final years of the Cold War (1980–1991) ==
Prime Minister Brian Mulroney and President Ronald Reagan had a close relationship, but the 1980s also saw widespread protests against American testing of cruise missiles in Canada's north.

In the early 1980s, Yakovlev accompanied Mikhail Gorbachev, who at the time was the Soviet official in charge of agriculture, on his tour of Canada. The purpose of the visit was to tour Canadian farms and agricultural institutions in the hopes of taking lessons that could be applied in the Soviet Union; however, the two began, tentatively at first, to discuss the need for liberalization in the Soviet Union. Yakovlev then returned to Moscow, and would eventually be called the "godfather of glasnost," the intellectual force behind Gorbachev's reform program.

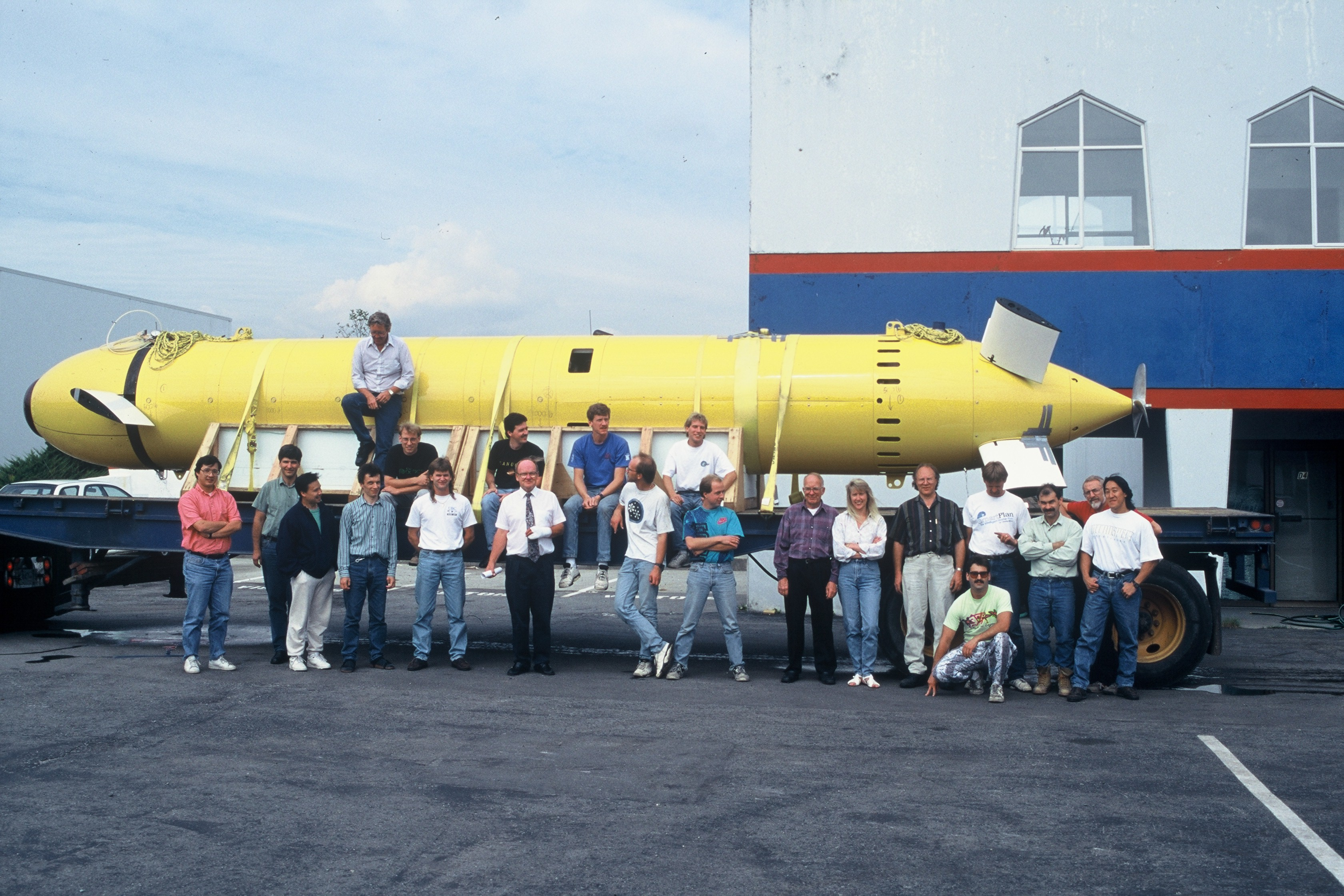
The Theseus prior to its sea trials. The AUV was developed in the late 1980s as a part of a larger project to detect Soviet submarines in the Arctic.

In 1987, Canada released a long-awaited White Paper on Defence; signalling its intent to re-assert sovereignty over its Arctic waters. Concerned that Soviet submarines were operating in Canada's Arctic Archipelago, several programs were proposed to close the gap between Canada's current capabilities and its commitments to NATO. Project Spinnaker was born, a joint Canada–US endeavour whose secret purpose was to provide the capability to monitor submarine traffic in Canadian Arctic waters by deploying acoustic listening posts on the seafloor. This project required the development of a large autonomous underwater vehicle—named Theseus—whose sole purpose was to lay communications trunk cables on the seafloor in waters with a permanent ice cover. In the spring of 1996, Theseus was transported to CFS Alert (on the northeastern tip of Ellesmere Island) and then was deployed from an ice camp where it laid 180 km of fibre optic cable on the seafloor in ice-covered waters, successfully delivering it to an acoustic array deployed on the edge of the Continental Shelf.

== Post-Cold War ==
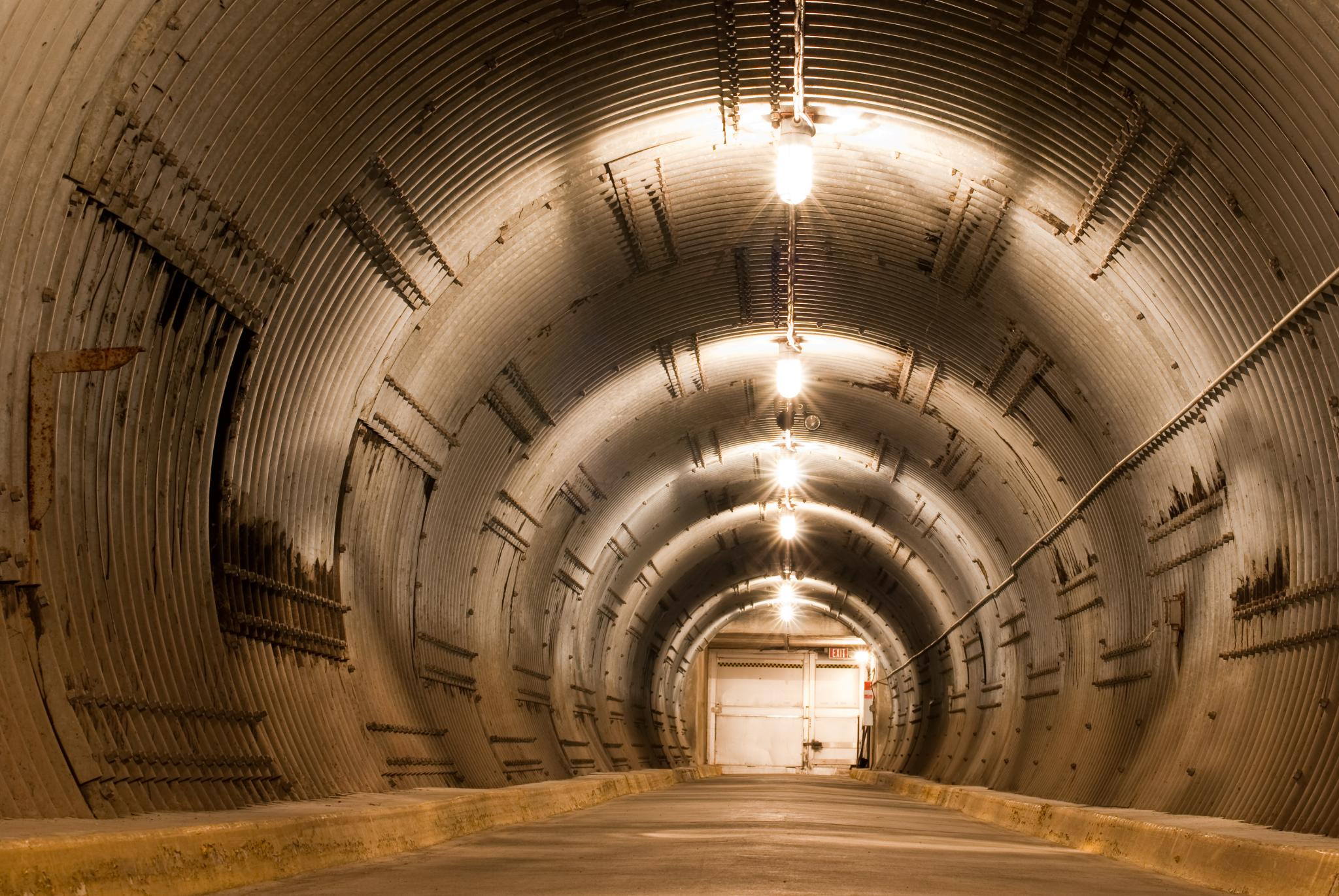
Blast tunnel entrance to CFS Carp, or the "Diefenbunker". The nuclear fallout shelter is one of several Emergency Government Headquarters decommissioned after the Cold War.

When the Cold War ended, Canadian Forces were withdrawn from their NATO commitments in Germany, military spending was cut, and air raid sirens were removed across the country. The Diefenbunkers, Canada's military-operated fallout shelters designed to ensure continuity of government, were decommissioned. In 1994, the last active United States military base in Canada, Naval Station Argentia Newfoundland, was decommissioned and the facility was turned over to the Government of Canada. The base was a storage facility for the Mk 101 Lulu and B57 nuclear bombs and a key node in the US Navy's SOSUS network to detect Soviet nuclear submarines. Canada continues to participate in Cold War institutions such as NORAD and NATO, but they have been given new missions and priorities.

The Cold War in Canada came to an end during the period of 1990–1995 as the traditional mission to contain Soviet expansion faded into the new realities of warfare. The Cold War required permanent foreign deployments to Western Europe, something which was no longer necessary, and as such bases closed down. Less equipment was needed, and so much was sold off, soon to be replaced by newer equipment designed for future conflicts. At home, bases were closed and operations consolidated and streamlined for maximum efficiency, as by the early 1990s many Canadians were openly questioning the necessity of large defence budgets.

In 1990, Canadian troops were deployed to assist provincial police in Québec in an effort to defuse tensions between Mohawk Warriors and the Sûreté du Québec and local residents. In 1991 Canadian Forces personnel deployed in support of the American liberation of Kuwait. By 1992, Canadian peacekeepers were deployed to Cambodia, Croatia and Somalia. In 1993 Balkan involvement expanded into Bosnia and Canadian troops participated in some of the fiercest combat since the Korean War during Operation Medak Pocket.

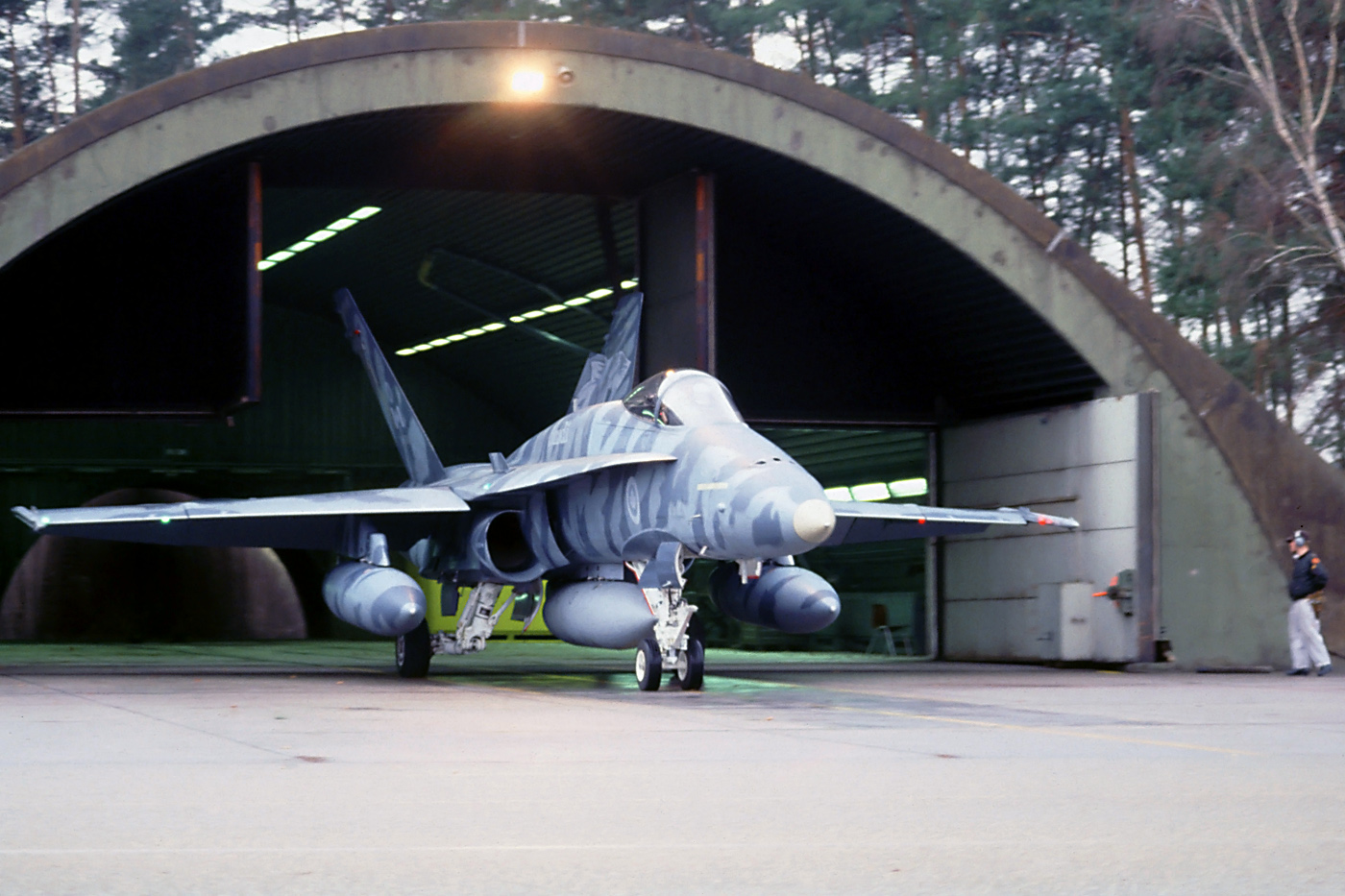
A CF-18 Hornet at CFB Baden–Soellingen, shortly before the airbase's closure in 1993. The end of the Cold War saw the withdrawal of Canadian military formations in Europe.

By the end of the 1990s, Canada would have a completely different military, one more inclined towards the rigours of peacekeeping and peace-making operations under multinational coalitions. The country would be further involved in the Yugoslav Wars throughout the rest of the decade, would become involved in Haiti, and would further see action again in Zaire and East Timor. The Navy, by decade's end (and prior to the modern post-9/11 era), was comparatively brand new, the Air Force well-balanced and modern as well. The Army began to acquire new equipment, such as the LAV-III, Bison APC and the Coyote Reconnaissance Vehicle as it transitioned to fighting irregular warfare instead of the large tank battles once feared would rage across Western Europe. It is with Canada's late-Cold War and early-Peacekeeping Era military that Canada would embark on its deployment to Afghanistan, currently Canada's longest-running war.

In recent years, Canada has been involved in tensions with Russia following the takeover of Crimea from Ukraine and China due to its diplomatic spat over various issues such as treatment of Uyghurs, Meng Wenzhou and Hong Kong protests.

== See also ==
- ABCANZ Armies
- History of Canada (1982–present)
- On Guard For Thee (1981) — a documentary series about Canada's national security operations during the Cold War
- Structure of the Canadian Armed Forces in 1989
