= Bijou Awards =

Retired annual Canadian media award

The Bijou Awards were a Canadian award for non-feature films, launched in 1981 but presented only once before being discontinued. Created as a joint project of the Academy of Canadian Cinema and the Canadian Film and Television Association (CFTA), the awards were essentially a new home for many of the categories, particularly but not exclusively the ones for television films, that had been dropped after the old Canadian Film Awards transitioned into the Genie Awards in 1980, as well as for the CFTA's trade and craft awards in areas such as television advertising and educational films.

The ceremony was held on October 28, 1981, at Casa Loma in Toronto, Ontario, and hosted by Nancy White.

The awards were not presented in 1982, as the Academy of Canadian Cinema undertook detailed planning toward introducing permanent television awards. In 1983, the Academy formally proposed that the Bijou Awards replace the ACTRA Awards as the primary national television award, although this did not occur and the Bijous were ultimately never presented again; instead, the Gemini Awards, the Academy's permanent awards for television production, were launched in 1986, and in 2012 the Genies and the Geminis were merged into the contemporary Canadian Screen Awards.

Some later sources have occasionally misattributed the Bijou winners as Genie or Gemini winners.

== Winners and nominees ==
Best Television Drama Over 30 Minutes	Best Television Drama Under 30 Minutes
War Brides — Bill Gough; The Running Man; You've Come a Long Way, Katie	The Olden Days Coat — Michael MacMillan, Seaton McLean, Janice Platt; Dernier Voyage; Irene Moves In
Best Documentary Over 30 Minutes	Best Documentary Under 30 Minutes
Challenger: An Industrial Romance — Stephen Low; The Last Days of Living; The Lost Pharaoh	Nose and Tina — Wolf Koenig; Laughlines; Steady as She Goes
Best Actor	Best Actress
Chuck Shamata, The Running Man; Richard Monette, A Far Cry from Home; Al Waxman, The Winnings of Frankie Walls	Lally Cadeau, You've Come a Long Way, Katie; Sharry Flett, War Brides; Dixie Seatle, A Population of One
Best Animation	Best Television Variety or Music
Getting Started — Richard Condie, Jerry Krepavich; One Way Street (Les Naufragés du quartier) — Bernard Longpré; Premiers jours — Clorinda Warny, Suzanne Gervais, Lina Gagnon	Royal Canadian Air Farce — Trevor Evans; Catulli Carmina; The Hawk
Best Director of a Drama	Best Director of a Documentary
Donald Brittain, The Running Man; Martin Lavut, War Brides; Peter Rowe, Final Edition	Norma Bailey, Nose and Tina; Robert Fresco, Steady as She Goes; Nick Kendall, The Last Pharaoh
Nielsen-Ferns International First Production Award	Chetwynd Award for Business Promotion
Exposure - Wayne Arron; Against the River — York University Film Department; Steady as She Goes — Pretty Pictures	PFA Labs
Best Screenplay	Best Non-Dramatic Script
Gilles Carle and Roger Lemelin, The Plouffe Family (Les Plouffe); Tony Sheer, Final Edition; Grahame Woods, War Brides	Michel Gerard, The Canadian Establishment: "Ten Toronto Street"; Donald Brittain, The Lost Pharaoh; Gail Singer, Love, Honoured and Bruised
Best Instructional Program	Best Commercial
Estuary — Peter Jones; Class Project: The Garbage Movie; What's Bugging Him?	Imperial Oil: "Energy Efficiency" — Patti Grech; Coffee Council: "Cowboys" — Rabko Television Productions; Sunlight: "Wedding" — The Partners Film Co.
Best Art Direction	Best Music Score
Barbara McLean, War Brides	Larry Crosley, The Lost Pharaoh
Best Cinematography in a Drama	Best Cinematography in a Documentary
Vic Sarin, War Brides	Robert Fresco, Steady as She Goes
Best Independent Production	Best Sales, Promotion or Public Relations Film
The Breakthrough — Ira Levy, Peter Williamson; The Olden Days Coat; One Thousand Dozen; Le Paradis des Chefs — Badji le pur	Snow — Lloyd Walton for Ontario Parks; Be a Winner! — Pro Creation Canada; The Little Paper That Grew — Extra Modern Productions
Best Editing in a Drama	Best Editing in a Documentary
Myrtle Virgo, War Brides	Harvey Zlatarits, The Hawk
Best Sound	Best Visual Effects
Ed Chong, The Running Man	Colin Chivers, RC Cola: "Innertube"
Best Audio-Video, 1-7 Projector Programs	Best Audio-Video, 8-18 Projector Programs
Modulighting	The Green Network
