= 11th ACTRA Awards =

Canadian television awards ceremony

- Date: May 12, 1982
- Hosted by: Jim Carrey, Dixie Seatle

Highlights
- Best TV Program: Just Another Missing Kid
- Best Radio Program: This Year in Jerusalem

Television/radio coverage
- Network: CBC Television

The 11th ACTRA Awards were presented on May 12, 1982. The ceremony was hosted by Jim Carrey and Dixie Seatle.

The Canadian Broadcasting Corporation, as the broadcaster of the ceremony, had originally proposed Dan Aykroyd as host, but he was rejected by ACTRA on the grounds that he was working in the United States and not an active ACTRA member.

== Television ==
Best Television Program	Best Children's Television Program
Just Another Missing Kid; Cambodia: Tragedy in Eden; On Guard For Thee: "The Most Dangerous Spy"	Switchback; The Olden Days Coat; Polka Dot Door
Best Television Actor	Best New Performer
Lally Cadeau, You've Come a Long Way, Katie; Mary Ann McDonald, A Far Cry from Home; Chuck Shamata, The Running Man	Leslie Toth, Once; Colm Feore, The Running Man; Cecily Thomson, Snowbirds
Best Supporting TV Performance	Best TV Variety Performance
Ken James, You've Come a Long Way, Katie; Robert Christie, Snowbirds; Richard Monette, A Far Cry from Home; Vivian Reis, Talk Show	Evelyn Hart and David Peregrine, Belong; Roger Abbott, Dave Broadfoot, Don Ferguson, Luba Goy and John Morgan, Royal Canadian Air Farce; John Candy, Joe Flaherty, Eugene Levy, Andrea Martin, Rick Moranis, Catherine O'Hara and Dave Thomas, SCTV
Best Television Host or Interviewer	Best Writing, Television Drama
Adrienne Clarkson, The Fifth Estate: "Hebron"; Ian Parker, Just Another Missing Kid; Patrick Watson, Titans; Elwy Yost, Saturday Night at the Movies	Tony Sheer, Final Edition; Louis Del Grande and David Barlow, Seeing Things: "I May Be Seeing Things, But I'm Not Crazy"; Rob Forsyth, Takeover
Best Writing, Television Comedy/Variety	Best Writihg, Television Public Affairs
Roger Abbott, Dave Broadfoot, Don Ferguson, Gord Holtam, John Morgan and Rick Olsen, Royal Canadian Air Farce; Dick Blasucci, Paul Flaherty, Andrea Martin, Rick Moranis and Catherine O'Hara, SCTV: "The Libby Wolfson Wraparound"; Alden Nowlan, Christmas at King's Landing	Donald Brittain, On Guard For Thee: "The Most Dangerous Spy"; Ian Parker and John Zaritsky, Just Another Missing Kid; Wendy Strazdine, Pacific Report: "The People vs. Policy"

== Radio ==
Best Radio Program	Best Radio Host or Interviewer
This Year in Jerusalem; On Golden Pond; Sunday Morning: "Under the Olive Tree"	Don Harron, Morningside; Jay Ingram, Quirks & Quarks; Peter Gzowski, Morningside
Best Radio Actor	Best Radio Variety Performance
Mary Pirie, Sunday Matinee: "Party Girl"; Douglas Campbell, Nightfall: "The Appetite of Mr. Lucraft"; Len Cariou, Cyrano de Bergerac	Roger Abbott, Dave Broadfoot, Don Ferguson, Luba Goy and John Morgan, Royal Canadian Air Farce; Bill Buck, Norm Grohmann, Maria Gropper and Bill Reiter, Mr. Bundolo; Nancy White, Morningside
Best Writing, Radio Drama	Best Writing, Radio Variety
Erika Ritter, Automatic Pilot; Michael Mercer, Hope: The Colours of Time; John Murrell, Waiting for the Parade	Philip Bedard, Glen Davis and Larry Lalonde, The Continuing Adventures of John Locke, Private Eye; Paul Chato, Rick Green, Peter Wildman and Dan Redican, Frantic Times; Maynard Collins, Hank Williams: The Show He Never Gave
Best Writing, Radio Documentary
Jurgen Hesse, Leon Trotsky in Exile; Wendy Lill, Who Is George Forest?; Barbara Nichol, Ideas: "Televangelism"

== Journalism and special awards ==
Gordon Sinclair Award	Foster Hewitt Award
Stephen Lewis; Elizabeth Gray; Joan Watson	Brian Williams; Mike Anscombe; Dave Hodge; Pat Marsden
John Drainie Award
Mavor Moore
