= Sharry Flett =

Canadian actress

Sharry Flett is a Canadian actress. She is most noted for her performances in the television films War Brides, for which she was a Bijou Award nominee for Best Actress in a Non-Feature in 1981, and The Suicide Murders, for which she was a Gemini Award nominee for Best Supporting Actress in a Drama Program or Series at the 1st Gemini Awards in 1986.

Flett trained as an opera singer, but began performing in speaking theatrical roles after finding herself being typecast in soubrette roles due to the quality of her singing voice.

== Filmography ==
=== Film ===
Year	Title	Role	Notes
1978	Drying Up the Streets	Nurse	

=== Television ===
Year	Title	Role	Notes
1978	The Arctic Adventure	The Polar Goddess	Television film
1980	The Great Detective	Emily	Episode: "Too Many Cooks"
1980	War Brides	Ellie	Television film
1982	The Taming of the Shrew	Katharina	Television film
1983	The Tempest	Miranda	Television film
1983	The Littlest Hobo	Sister Sarah	2 episodes
1985	Night Heat	Nurse	Episode: "Obie's Law"
1985	Love and Larceny	Alice Bigley	Television film
1985	The Suicide Murders	Hilda Blake	Television film
1986	Philip Marlowe, Private Eye	Miss Kolchenko	Episode: "Red Wind"
1987	I'll Take Manhattan	—	2 episodes
1987–1994	Street Legal	Various roles	5 episodes
1988	Alfred Hitchcock Presents	Judith Richardson	Episode: "A Stolen Heart"
1989	Lantern Hill	Lillian Morrow	Television film
1990	Friday the 13th: The Series	Ruth Stevens	Episode: "Repetition"
1990	My Secret Identity	Dean Patricia Simpson	Episode: "More Than Meets the Eye"
1990	C.B.C.'s Magic Hour	Susan	Episode: The Prom"
1992	Top Cops	Hester Bellomo	Episode: "Hester Bellomo and Carol Anne Natale"
1996	Forever Knight	Barbara Vetter	Episode: "Avenging Angel"
2002	The Eleventh Hour	Sophie Buckman	Episode: "The 37-Year-Itch"
2006	Shades of Black	Betty	Television film
