= You've Come a Long Way, Katie =

1981 Canadian television miniseries

- Genre: Drama
- Written by: Jeannine Locke; James Telfer
- Directed by: Vic Sarin
- Starring: Lally Cadeau; Douglas Campbell; Dinah Christie; Catherine O'Hara; Booth Savage
- Country of origin: Canada
- Original language: English
- No. of episodes: 3

Production
- Running time: 60 minutes

Original release
- Network: CBC Television
- Release: January 4 – January 6, 1981

You've Come a Long Way, Katie is a Canadian television miniseries, directed by Vic Sarin and broadcast by CBC Television in 1981. The series stars Lally Cadeau as Kate Forbes, a television talk show host struggling with alcoholism.

The cast also includes Douglas Campbell, Dinah Christie, Ken James, Catherine O'Hara and Booth Savage.

The miniseries aired as three one-hour episodes on January 4, 5 and 6, 1981, and was followed immediately by the premiere of the sitcom Hangin' In, also starring Cadeau, on January 7. Writing for Maclean's, Bill MacVicar likened the four-night streak of the two series to "the video equivalent of being shot from a cannon or, at least, making a premiere entrance on a red carpet, with klieg lights and a ravenous crowd of autograph seekers".

The miniseries was a Bijou Award nominee for Best Television Drama Over 30 Minutes, and Cadeau won the award for Best Actress in a Non-Feature. Cadeau also won the Earle Grey Award for Best Performance in a Television Film at the 11th ACTRA Awards in 1982.

== Cast ==
- Lally Cadeau
- Douglas Campbell
- Dinah Christie
- Catherine O'Hara
- Booth Savage

== Episodes ==
No.	Title	Directed by	Written by	Original release date
1	"Madder Music"	Unknown	Unknown	January 4, 1981
2	"A Month on the Moon"	Unknown	Unknown	January 5, 1981
3	"The Bottom Line"	Unknown	Unknown	January 6, 1981
