= The Hawk (1982 film) =

1982 Canadian documentary film

- Directed by: Martin Kahan
- Produced by: Henry Less
- Starring: Ronnie Hawkins
- Edited by: Harvey Zlatarits
- Production company: Amulet Pictures
- Release date: September 18, 1982 (CBC)
- Running time: 90 minutes
- Country: Canada
- Language: English

The Hawk is a Canadian television documentary film, directed by Martin Kahan and broadcast in 1982. The film is a profile of Canadian rock legend Ronnie Hawkins.

The film was broadcast by CBC Television on September 18, 1982.

The film was a Bijou Award nominee for Best Television Variety or Music Program, and Harvey Zlatarits won the award for Best Editing in a Documentary.
