= The Wake (1986 film) =

Canadian drama film

- Directed by: Norma Bailey
- Screenplay by: Sharon Riis
- Produced by: Norma Bailey; Ches Yetman
- Starring: Victoria Snow; Michelle Thrush; Timothy Webber
- Cinematography: Ian Elkin
- Edited by: Lara Mazur
- Production company: National Film Board of Canada
- Release date: 1986
- Country: Canada
- Language: English

The Wake (also known as Veillée funèbre) is a 1986 Canadian drama film directed by Norma Bailey and written by Sharon Riis. The film was produced by the National Film Board of Canada and was part of the organization's "Daughters of the Country" series, which looked at the lives of Métis women.

== Plot ==
Set in Alberta, The Wake centers around a love affair that forms between a Canadian police officer and a young Métis woman.

== Starring ==
- Victoria Snow as Joan Laboucane
- Diane Debassige as Donna Desjarlais
- Timothy Webber as Jim Whalen
- Michelle Thrush as Marlene
