= The Running Man (1981 film) =

- Genre: Narrative fiction
- Written by: Anna Sandor
- Directed by: Donald Brittain
- Starring: Chuck Shamata; Barbara Gordon; Don Scanlon
- Country of origin: Canada
- Original language: English

Production
- Producer: Bill Gough
- Running time: 60 minutes

Original release
- Network: CBC Television
- Release: 22 February 1981

The Running Man is a Canadian television film, directed by Donald Brittain and broadcast in 1981 as an episode of the CBC Television drama anthology For the Record. It was Brittain's first narrative fiction film in a career making documentary films, and the first Canadian television film ever to explicitly address the subject of homosexuality.

The film won three Bijou Awards in 1981, for Best Actor in a Non-Feature (Shamata), Best Director of a Drama (Brittain) and Best Sound (Ed Chong). It received two ACTRA Award nominations at the 11th ACTRA Awards in 1982, for Best Television Actor (Shamata) and Best New Performer (Feore).

== Synopsis ==
Ben Garfield is a high school teacher and coach, married for 10 years with two children, who has to come to terms with the fact he is gay. His wife Liz, initially believes he is having an affair and is mad, but when she finds out the truth about her husband, she is confused and angry.

After having a lengthy conversation, the couple come to the realization that they can not start over again, but they also acknowledge they do not know how to resolve Ben's revelation either. Meanwhile, to complicate matters, a priest who heads a local community morality organization writes a letter to the school principal informing the principal that Ben is gay.

Ben is then asked to resign from his position at the school. After considering the request, and also thinking about moving from Toronto to Vancouver, he decides to stay at his job with the support of his wife. Ben declares that "all my life I've hated myself, I've tried to be someone else, it's time I stopped lying."

== Cast ==
- Chuck Shamata as Ben Garfield
- Barbara Gordon as Liz Garfield
- Don Scanlon as Michael
- Colm Feore as Rick
- David Field as Jeff
- Kate Trotter as Professor
- Linda Sorenson as Elaine
- Shelley Hoffman as Student

== Background and production ==
This was Brittain's first drama film that he directed, having been known for spending his career making documentary films. Brittain said he was pleased the film's release was at the same time of recent police raids on gay clubs in the Toronto area. He said that he was "appalled" by the recent police action, and found it "shocking and repugnant." Senior executives at CBC originally wanted to label the film with a disclaimer "virtually outlining the entire plot", but after objections from Sam Levene from For the Record and John Kennedy, a CBC executive, they relented and instead agreed to a simpler warning that the drama was not intended for children.

Brittain says the film was shot in just eleven days, and remarked:

In a documentary, the director is virtually invisible, if he starts directing the subject, then the film is no longer a documentary. With drama, my role is to direct the actors and thereby shape the film.

== Reception ==
David Mole of The Body Politic who covered the film's production, said the film "is not really about homosexuality at all; the gay world makes only a fleeting appearance, and the show takes up the issue of homosexuality only in the most personal kind of way." He went on to say that the "gay angle mattered much more to me, but I was on a wild goose chase, I was asking questions about a drama they weren't making." Rick Groen of The Globe and Mail wrote that "it's well observed, nicely acted and tightly directed; unfortunately, at its centre, there beats the mechanical pulse of a calculated script long on good intentions but short on resonance."

Wessely Hicks from The Gazette wrote if the film "has a fault, it is that it moves almost too swiftly; but it attempts no facile answers and leaves the viewer, not with a sense of impending doom, but certainly with a sense of impending struggle and tragedy." Jim Bawden of The Toronto Star opined that "so many plot threads are left hanging about in this busy story that the viewer is justified in feeling confused; because the film runs away from some of the problems it tries to confront it is not wholly satisfying as drama or documentary." Canadian film critic Gerald Pratley commented it was a "moving and compassionate work."

Richard Labonté wrote in The Ottawa Citizen that "a month ago, the film might have been dismissed as a mawkish exercise in documentary fiction; but real life has a way of authenticating what appear to be the most melodramatic of stories; that fact was made more clear than ever earlier this month when Toronto police raided four bathhouses and arrested 286 men, some of them married." David Wesley of The Hamilton Spectator stated that "what saves it from being just another coming-out-of-the-closet story is a sensitive script, direction by the famed filmmaker Brittain, and a strong performance by Shamata."

== Accolades ==
The film won three Bijou Awards in 1981, for Best Actor in a Non-Feature (Shamata), Best Director of a Drama (Brittain) and Best Sound (Ed Chong). It received two ACTRA Award nominations at the 11th ACTRA Awards in 1982, for Best Television Actor (Shamata) and Best New Performer (Feore).
