= War Brides (1980 film) =

1980 Canadian television film

- Genre: Drama
- Written by: Grahame Woods
- Directed by: Martin Lavut
- Starring: Elizabeth Richardson; Sonja Smits; Wendy Crewson; Sharry Flett
- Country of origin: Canada
- Original language: English

Production
- Producer: Bill Gough
- Cinematography: Vic Sarin
- Editor: Myrtle Virgo
- Running time: 120 minutes

Original release
- Network: CBC Television
- Release: September 20, 1980

War Brides is a Canadian television film, directed by Martin Lavut and broadcast by CBC Television in 1980.

The film stars Elizabeth Richardson, Sonja Smits, Wendy Crewson and Sharry Flett, and Geoffrey Bowes, Ken Pogue, Timothy Webber and Layne Coleman.

== Plot ==
Four women, three from the United Kingdom and one from Germany, come to Canada as war brides of Canadian soldiers after the end of World War II.

== Release ==
The film was broadcast by CBC Television on September 20, 1980.

== Awards ==
The film won four awards at the Bijou Awards in 1981 for Best Television Drama Over 30 Minutes, Best Art Direction (Barbara McLean), Best Cinematography in a Drama (Vic Sarin) and Best Editing in a Drama (Myrtle Virgo). It also received nominations for Best Actress in a Non-Feature (Flett), Best Director of a Drama (Lavut) and Best Screenplay (Grahame Woods). Woods won the ACTRA Award for Best Writing in a TV Drama.
