= Nose and Tina =

- Directed by: Norma Bailey
- Produced by: Wolf Koenig
- Cinematography: Ian Elkin
- Edited by: Sally Paterson
- Music by: Ron Halldorson; Ray St. Germain
- Production company: National Film Board of Canada
- Release date: 1981
- Running time: 27 minutes
- Country: Canada
- Language: English

Nose and Tina is a Canadian short documentary film, directed by Norma Bailey and released in 1981. The film profiles Dorian "Nose" Ozykowski and Linda "Tina" Migwans, a brakeman and a prostitute in Winnipeg who are in a romantic relationship with each other, which is tested when one of Tina's clients physically assaults her, leading Nose to face criminal charges after he finds and beats the client up in retaliation.

Bailey was inspired to contact the couple and make the film after reading an article about the arrest in the newspaper.

The film was made in 1980, and had its theatrical premiere in Winnipeg in 1981.

Larry Krotz of The Globe and Mail wrote that "Miss Bailey has dealt competently with a tough subject. Competently, but not spectacularly. The documentary form is simultaneously the film's great strength and its weakness. There is strength in the authenticity of the movie; these are real people quite courageously, if a bit self-consciously, playing themselves. However, since Nose and Tina are living their own lives, Miss Bailey can't give them a script. Thus while there are moments of warmth, the moments of insight are few."

The film won the award for Best Documentary Under 30 Minutes, and Bailey won Best Director of a Documentary, at the Bijou Awards in October 1981.

In 1995 Bailey released The True Story of Linda M., a sequel film which expanded on Migwans's life since the original film.
