= History of Canada (1982–present) =

Post-Canada Act
- 1982–present
History of Canada (1960–1981)
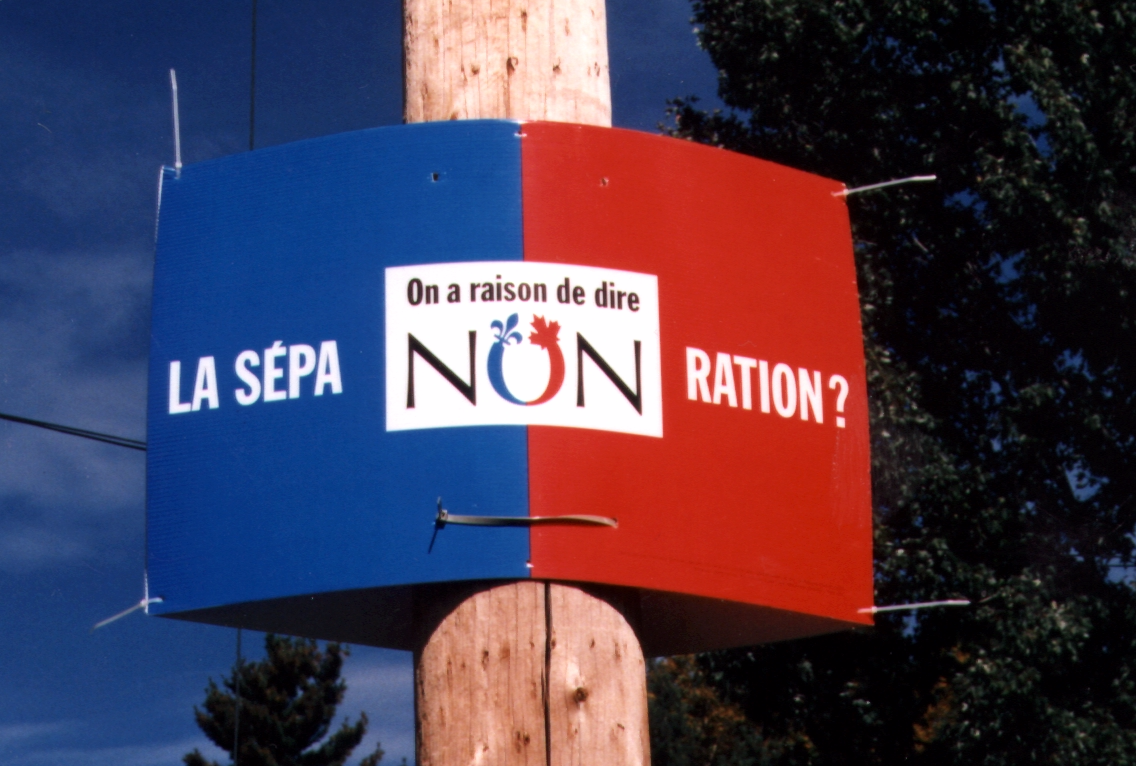
- The "No" sign, during the 1995 Quebec referendum
- Monarch(s): Elizabeth II; Charles III
- Leaders: Brian Mulroney; Kim Campbell; Jean Chrétien; Paul Martin; Stephen Harper; Justin Trudeau; Mark Carney

== The Canada Act (1982) ==
In 1982, the Canada Act was passed by the British parliament and granted Royal Assent by Queen Elizabeth II on March 29. The corresponding Constitution Act was passed by the Canadian parliament and granted Royal Assent by the Queen on April 17, thus patriating the Constitution of Canada, and marking one of Trudeau's last major acts before his resignation in 1984. Previously, the constitution has existed only as an act of British parliament, and the documents remained there. Canada had established complete sovereignty as an independent country, with the Queen's role as monarch of Canada separate from her role as the British monarch or the monarch of any of the other Commonwealth realms.

At the same time, the Canadian Charter of Rights and Freedoms was added in place of the previous Canadian Bill of Rights. Some of the negotiations between provincial and federal leaders, specifically those concerning the so-called Notwithstanding Clause, had failed to include Quebec Premier René Lévesque. Resentment over this "stab in the back" led to attempts to veto the constitution, which were ultimately ruled out.

== Mulroney and Campbell governments (1984–1993) ==
Brian Mulroney came to power in the 1984 election, and quickly restored friendlier relations with the United States, which had been strained during Trudeau's time as prime minister. Prime Minister Mulroney's major focus was the establishment of free trade with the US, a very controversial topic. Eventually, the Canada-United States Free Trade Agreement was signed in January 1988.

Mulroney also worked to appease the sovereignty movement in Quebec. In 1987, he attempted to draft the Meech Lake Accord, amending the 1982 constitution so that it would be acceptable to Quebec, which had not yet signed it. However, the Meech Lake Accord failed to be ratified by all provinces. In 1994, Canada signed the North American Free Trade Agreement; it was eventually succeeded by the United States–Mexico–Canada Agreement in 2018.

In 1989, the Progressive Conservative government of Prime Minister Mulroney proposed the creation of a national sales tax on goods and services (GST). The proposal was an instant controversy; a large proportion of the Canadian population was irritated and disapproved of the tax. Despite protests from the other parties and even members of Mulroney's own caucus, the GST was introduced on January 1, 1991. The political ramifications of the GST were severe. It contributed to the Mulroney government becoming one of the least popular in Canadian history.

=== Air India Disaster ===
On June 23, 1985, Air India Flight 182 exploded while at an altitude of 31,000 feet (9,400 m) above the Atlantic Ocean, south of Ireland; all 329 on board were killed, of whom 82 were children and 280 were Canadian citizens. Up until September 11, 2001, the Air India bombing was the single deadliest terrorist attack involving aircraft. It is also the largest mass murder in Canadian history.

=== École Polytechnique massacre ===
On December 6, 1989, Marc Lépine entered the École Polytechnique in Montreal. He went into an engineering class, separated the men from the women, forced out the men at gunpoint, began to scream about how he hated feminists, and then opened fire on the women. Lépine continued his rampage in other parts of the building, opening fire on other women he encountered. He killed 14 women (13 students and one employee of the university) and injured thirteen others before committing suicide. The massacre profoundly shocked Canadians. The Quebec government and the Montreal city government declared three days of mourning.

Initial news reports did not note that all 14 victims were women. When Lépine's motive became clear, the event served as a massive spur for the Canadian feminist movement and for action against violence against women. In 1991 Parliament officially designated December 6 as the National Day of Remembrance and Action on Violence Against Women.

=== Oka Crisis ===
The Oka Crisis was a land dispute between the Mohawk nation and the town of Oka, Quebec, which began on July 11, 1990, and lasted until September 26. It resulted in three deaths, and was the first of a number of violent conflicts between Indigenous people and the Canadian Government in the late 20th century.

=== Gulf War ===
Canada was one of the first nations to agree to condemn Iraq's 1990 invasion of Kuwait, and promptly agreed to join the US-led coalition. When the UN authorized the full use of force in the 1991 Gulf War, Canada sent three warships, two CF18 fighter squadrons and field hospital with support personnel. This was the first time since the Korean War that its forces had participated in combat operations. Canada suffered no casualties during the conflict, but since its end, many veterans have complained of suffering from Gulf War Syndrome.

=== Good and Services Tax Implementation ===
On January 1, 1991, the Goods and Services Tax (GST) legislation became effective. This decision was particularly controversial because Prime Minister Mulroney lacked sufficient votes in the Senate to pass the legislation enabling the tax, as the Senate had a Liberal majority and who refused to support the legislation. Mulroney bypassed the Liberal majority by invoking section 26 of the Constitution Act, 1867 and appointing eight new Senators, creating a Progressive Conservative Senate majority. While originally intended to be set at 9%, the rate was lowered to 7%.

=== 1992 Atlantic Cod Moratorium ===
In 1992, Prime Minister Brian Mulroney's Fisheries and Oceans Minister John Crosbie declared a moratorium on the northwestern Atlantic cod fishery, which had dominated the Newfoundland and Labrador economy for 500 years and provided sustenance for generations of residents. The moratorium was declared after cod biomass levels dropped to 1% of its historical level. The moratorium resulted in a loss of 35,000 jobs in 400 coastal communities in Newfoundland and Labrador, the largest one day job loss in Canadian history.

=== Resignation of Mulroney ===
The failure of the Meech Lake Accord and the animosity towards Prime Minister Brian Mulroney, his government and his GST played a significant role in the defeat of the 1992 referendum on the Charlottetown Accord, another package of proposed constitutional amendments. These setbacks, along with the deep recession of the late 1980s and early 1990s forced Mulroney to resign in 1993. He was replaced, albeit only briefly from June to November 1993, by Kim Campbell, Canada's first, and so far only, female prime minister. The PC party was defeated in the 1993 federal election, with Campbell losing her seat in the House of Commons and the PC's only winning 2 seats in a major political realignment.

== Chrétien government (1993–2003) ==
Jean Chrétien became prime minister in the 1993 election, pledging to repeal the Goods and Services Tax, although this proved unfeasible due to the economic circumstances at the time (or, apparently, any time during his prime ministership, showing the new source of income was needed, as the outgoing Progressive Conservative party had claimed). By 1995, however, Canada had eliminated the federal deficit, becoming the only G7 country to have a budget surplus.

Some of the problems faced by the Chrétien government included the debate over the universal health care system, as well as military spending, which Chrétien's government decreased significantly throughout its term. Canada did not play as large a role in United Nations peacekeeping as it once had, and Chrétien faced some criticism for not participating in the 2003 invasion of Iraq, most notably from Opposition Leader Stephen Harper and the United States government. However, with the mounting criticisms about the false pretences for that war and the United States' troubled occupation of Iraq, Chrétien was hailed for keeping the nation out of the affair. The value of the Canadian dollar was greatly weakened during Chrétien's time as prime minister, dropping as low at 67 cents; although in 2003, it regained about 20% of its value during the year due to the declining economic situation in the United States—such a dramatic climb that industry leaders worried that the high currency would harm exports.

=== Turbot War ===
The "Turbot War" of 1990 was an international fishing dispute between Canada and the European Union which ended in the Canadian Department of Fisheries and Oceans boarding a Spanish fishing trawler, the Estai, in international waters and arresting its crew. Canada claimed that European Union factory fishing trawlers were illegally overfishing the nose and tail of the Grand Banks, just outside Canada's declared 200 nautical mile (370 km) Exclusive Economic Zone (EEZ).

The Spanish ship's crew had been using a net with a mesh size that was smaller than permitted (larger mesh sizes permit juvenile fish to escape and grow). The 17-story net was shipped to New York City and hung from a crane on the East River where federal Minister of Fisheries and Oceans, Brian Tobin called an international press conference outside the United Nations headquarters. Spain never denied that the net was from the Estai but continued to protest Canada's use of "extra-territorial force". The Spanish government asked the International Court of Justice in The Hague, Netherlands for leave to hear a case claiming Canada had no right to arrest the Estai. However, the court later refused the case.

=== 1995 Quebec referendum ===
In October 1995, Canada faced its second Quebec referendum on sovereignty. The federal Bloc Québécois and the provincial Parti Québécois favoured separation from Canada. Federalists rallied to keep Quebec as part of Canada and claimed the referendum question ("Do you agree that Quebec should become sovereign after having made a formal offer to Canada for a new economic and political partnership within the scope of the bill respecting the future of Quebec and of the agreement signed on June 12, 1995?") was vague and confusing. After large campaigns from both the "oui" and "non" sides, the referendum was defeated by the narrowest of margins: a victory for those opposed to secession, with 50.58% of the vote.

=== Creation of Nunavut ===
Nunavut on the map of Canada

In April 1982, a majority of Northwest Territories residents voted in favour of a division of the area, and the federal government gave a conditional agreement seven months later. After a long series of land claim negotiations between the Inuit Tapirisat of Canada and the federal government (begun earlier in 1976), an agreement was reached in September 1992. In June 1993, the Nunavut Land Claims Agreement Act and the Nunavut Act were passed by the Canadian Parliament, and the transition to the new territory of Nunavut was completed on April 1, 1999.

=== Peacekeeping ===
After the end of the Cold War, the frequency of international peacekeeping missions and humanitarian interventions grew dramatically and Canadian participation grew along with it. In the 1990s, Canadians were active in United Nations peacekeeping missions in Western Sahara, Cambodia, the former Yugoslavia, Haiti, East Timor and Sierra Leone. During the US-led humanitarian mission to Somalia in 1993, Canadian soldiers tortured a Somali teenager to death, leading to the Somalia Affair. Following an inquiry, the elite Canadian Airborne Regiment was disbanded and the reputation of the Canadian Forces suffered within Canada.

== Martin government (2003–2006) ==
Following the resignation of Prime Minister Chrétien at the end of 2003, Canadian Auditor General Sheila Fraser released a report in February 2004 which revealed that $100 million was mishandled by government officials in the purchasing of advertisements under the Chrétien government. The opposition was quick to make charges of corruption in what become known as the Sponsorship Scandal.

Owing in large part to the scandal, the Liberal Party (by this time, led by Paul Martin) lost its majority in the 2004 election, but was able to form a minority government. The 38th Canadian Parliament successfully passed the Civil Marriage Act, legalizing same-sex marriage in Canada, despite the opposition of the newly formed Conservative Party of Canada. Ultimately, the Liberals fell to a motion of no confidence in November 2005, leading to another election after only two years.

== Harper government (2006–2015) ==
Stephen Harper's Conservatives were able to secure minority governments in the 2006 and 2008 federal elections. In December 2008, a parliamentary dispute began when the Liberal leader Stéphane Dion and the New Democratic Party leader Jack Layton announced an agreement to form a coalition government with the support of the Bloc Québécois if they were successful in ousting the Conservative minority government in a confidence vote. Governor General Michaëlle Jean, however, granted Harper's request to prorogue parliament until January 26, 2009, thereby delaying the confidence vote. The potential coalition collapsed during the prorogation, and no confidence vote was held.

The succession of minority governments ended on May 2, 2011, when Stephen Harper and his Conservative party won the 41st Canadian federal election with a majority of seats (166 of a total of 308 seats) over Jack Layton's New Democratic Party (which formed the official opposition, with 103 seats, after winning all but four of the seats formerly held by the Bloc Québécois in Quebec and making gains elsewhere in Canada) while the Liberals under Michael Ignatieff finished third for the first time in that party's history, with 34 seats. During his premiership, Harper reduced Canada's budget deficit from $55.6 billion in 2009 to $2.9 billion in 2015, faced the In and Out scandal, passed the Federal Accountability Act, withdrew from the Kyoto Protocol, passed the Québécois nation motion, negotiated free trade agreements, passed the Veterans' Bill of Rights, and faced the 2011 Canadian federal election voter suppression scandal. Harper was the first prime minister from the modern Conservative Party of Canada, which was formed following the merger of the Reform Party and the PC party.

== Trudeau government (2015–2025) ==
In October 2015, Canada's 42nd general federal election was held. The Liberal Party won 39.5% of the popular vote and 184 seats in the House of Commons, with Justin Trudeau elected prime minister.

In 2019, allegations that the Trudeau government was putting pressure on then-attorney general Jody Wilson-Raybould were reported by The Globe and Mail. This became known as the SNC-Lavalin affair. Despite this and an additional blackface controversy, Trudeau managed to win the 2019 federal election, though with a minority of seats. He later faced the WE Charity scandal.

The COVID-19 pandemic was first detected in Canada in late mid-January 2020 and by March, all provinces and territories had declared states of emergency. As of June 2022, Canada has reported 41,000 COVID-19 related deaths, the third highest mortality rate in North America followed by the United States and Mexico. Trudeau's government announced a ban on "assault-style" weapons after the 2020 Nova Scotia attacks, which resulted in the deaths of 22 victims. Amid the Canada convoy protest in early 2022, Trudeau's government invoked the Emergencies Act for the first time. In October 2022, the House of Commons passed a motion declaring the Indigenous residential school system as genocide following the discovery of gravesites.

Trudeau called a snap election in 2021 to try and increase the Liberal party's seat share and reach a majority government. Trudeau won the 2021 federal election, albeit maintaining the Liberal party's minority number of seats. The Liberals and the NDP had a confidence and supply agreement from March 2022 to September 2024, helping pass legislation including a national childcare program. The 2024–2025 Canadian political crisis erupted following the resignation of deputy prime minister and finance minister Chrystia Freeland. Multiple Liberal MPs called on Trudeau to resign, which he announced in early January 2025. It took effect following a Liberal leadership race.

== Carney government (2025–present) ==
Former Bank of Canada governor Mark Carney won the Liberal leadership election and was sworn in as prime minister in March 2025. Carney became the first prime minister to never have served in elected office. In the 2025 Canadian federal election, on April 28, Carney led the Liberals to a minority government, winning 169 seats. The campaign was dominated by U.S. president Donald Trump's threats to annex Canada and announcement of tariffs against the country.

== See also ==
- First Nations
- History of Canada
- Meech Lake Accord
