= Norma Bailey =

Canadian film director

Norma Bailey (born 1949) is a Canadian film writer, producer, and director whose work is rooted in feminist and intersectional film theory. Bailey has directed several films, both in English and French and in various different genres, including fiction and non-fiction films. Her prolific career within the film industry has awarded her various awards and professional accolades including being named to the Order of Manitoba in 2010.

== Career ==
Norma Bailey was born in Gimli, Manitoba, Canada, and graduated from the University of Manitoba and began her film career as a production assistant on David Cronenberg's Rabid. She joined the National Film Board of Canada where her first short, The Performer (1980), made for the Canada Vignettes series, won a jury prize for short film at the Cannes Film Festival. Bailey has since then had an extensive career writing, producing, and directing numerous shorts, documentaries, features, and television dramas including The Sheldon Kennedy Story for CTV, Cowboys and Indians: The Killing of J. J. Harper for CBC and the Genie Award–winning Bordertown Café in 1992, which was an adaptation of a play by Kelly Rebar. Norma Bailey also served as a producer for a four-part series Daughters of the Country about aboriginal women's interactions with white society.

== Filmography ==
- The Performer (1978)
- Chasing the Eclipse (1979)
- Rice Harvest (1980)
- Bush Pilot: Reflections on a Canadian Myth (1980)
- Nose and Tina (1981)
- It's Hard to Get It Here (1984)
- Discussions in Bioethics: Family Tree (1985)
- The Wake (1986)
- Ikwe (1986)
- Heart Land (1987)
- Martha, Ruth and Edie (1988)
- Women in the Shadows (1992)
- Bordertown Café (1992)
- The True Story of Linda M. (1995)
- My Life as a Dog: "Widgeon", "The Fugitive" (1995)
- For Those Who Hunt the Wounded Down (1996)
- Nights Below Station Street (1997)
- The Sheldon Kennedy Story (1999)
- The Adventures of Shirley Holmes: "The Case of the Hidden Heart", "The Case of the Desperate Dancer", "The Case of the Falling Star", "The Case of the Vanishing Virus", "The Case of the Forbidden Mountain", "The Case of the Miracle Mine", "The Case of the Broken Oath", "The Case of the Doggone Cats", "The Case of the Exact Change", "The Case of the King of Hearts" (1997–2000)
- Secret Cutting (2000)
- The Stalking of Laurie Show, a/k/a Rivals (2000)
- Queen of Swords: "Betrayed", "End of Days" (2001)
- Stolen Miracle (2001)
- 2030 CE: "Strange Medicine", "Free Jake" (2002)
- Mercy Peak: "To Kill a Minah Bird", "Cruel to Be Kind" (2002)
- The Atwood Stories: "Isis in Darkness" (2003)
- Cowboys and Indians: The J.J. Harper Story (2003)
- The Shields Stories: "Hazel" (2004)
- Ladies Night (2005)
- Ken Leishman: The Flying Bandit (2005)
- North of Hope (2005)
- Eight Days to Live (2006)
- Falcon Beach: "Permanent Collection", "Lovers and Cheaters", "Thirteen Minutes to Midnight", "Sins of the Father", "The Spins", "Desperados", "Trust This", "Summer Solstice", Getting to Know You" (2006–2008)
- The Capture of the Green River Killer (2008)
- Too Late to Say Goodbye (2009)
- The Christmas Hope (2009)
- Cashing In: All episodes (2009–2014)
- The Devil's Teardrop (2010)
- Committed (2011)
- The Pastor's Wife (2011)
- An Officer and a Murderer (2012)
- Romeo Killer: The Chris Porco Story (2013)
- Cracked: "The Hold Out" (2013)
- The Christmas Secret (2014)
- The Pinkertons: "Mudd and Clay", "On Account of Huckleberries" (2015)
- Garage Sale Mystery: "The Novel Murders" (2016)
- Beauty and the Beast: "Beast of Times, Worst of Times", "Patient X", "Catch Me If You Can" (2014–2016)
- Murdoch Mysteries: "Concocting a Killer" and "A Study in Pink" (2016)
- Heartland: "Sound of Silence", "Faking It", "Eclipse of the Heart" (2015–2017)
- Reign: "The Shakedown", "Strand Bedfellows", "Wedlock", "Fugitive", "Blood for Blood", "Dirty Laundry" (2014–2017)
- Outlander: "Crème de Menthe", "A. Malcome" (2017)
- Frankie Drake Mysteries: "Summer in the City" (2017)
- Ransom: "The Client" (2018)
- Mary Kills People: "Girl Problems", "The Key to Faith", "Ride or Die", "Twin Flames" (2018–2019)
- Anne with an E: "The Summit of My Desires", "A Hope of Meeting You in Another World", "The Determining Acts of Her Life" (2018–2019)
- Spinning Out: "Healing Time May Vary", "Have a Nice Day!" (2020)
- Project Blue Book: "Broken Arrow" "Curse of the Skinwalker", "The Green Fireballs", "Foo Fighters" (2019–2020)
- Star Trek: Discovery: "Su'Kal" (2020)
- Batwoman - "Gore on Canvas" (2021)
- Superman & Lois: "Holding the Wrench" (2021)
- Home Before Dark: "The Smoking Gun" (2021)
- The Lost Symbol: "Order Eight" (2021)
- The Way Home: "The Day the Music Died", "Not All Who Wander Are Lost" (2023)
- SkyMed: "Code Silver", "Little Lies" (2023)
- Love on the Danube: Royal Getaway (2024)

== Awards ==
=== American Indian Film Festival ===
Year	Title	Award	Result
2003	Cowboys and Indians: The J.J. Harper Story	American Indian Movie Award - Best Director	Winner
2003	Cowboys and Indians: The J.J. Harper Story	American Indian Movie Award - Best Film	Nominee

=== Canadian Screen Awards, CA ===
Year	Title	Award	Result
2020	Mary Kills People	Canadian Screen Award - Best Direction in a Dramatic Series	Winner
2019	Mary Kills People	Canadian Screen Award - Best Direction in a Dramatic Series	Winner
2013	The Pastor's Wife	Canadian Screen Award - Best Direction in a Dramatic Program or Mini-Series	Nominee

=== Cannes Film Festival ===
Year	Title	Award	Result
1980	Canada Vignettes: The Performer	Jury Prize - Best Short Film	Winner
1980	Canada Vignettes: The Performer	Palme d'Or - Best Short Film	Nominee

=== Directors Guild of Canada ===
Year	Title	Award	Result
2019	Mary Kills People	Outstanding Directorial Achievement - Movies for Television and Mini-Series	Winner
2013	An Officer and a Murderer	DGC Team Award - Television and Mini-Series	Nominee
2011	The Devil's Teardrop	DGC Craft Award - Direction - Television Movie/Mini-Series	Nominee
2011	The Devil's Teardrop	DGC Team Award - Television and Mini-Series	Nominee
2010	Too Late to Say Goodbye	DGC Craft Award - Outstanding Achievement in Direction - Television Movie/Mini-Series	Winner
2009	The Capture of the Green River Killer	DGC Craft Award - Direction - Television Movie/Mini-Series	Winner
2006	Ken Leishman: The Flying Bandit	DGC Team Award - Outstanding Documentary	Nominee
2004	Cowboys and Indians: The J.J. Harper Story	DGC Craft Award - Outstanding Achievement in Direction - Television Movie or Mini-Series	Nominee

=== Gemini Awards ===
Year	Title	Award	Result
2008	The Capture of the Green River Killer	Gemini - Best Direction in a Dramatic Program or Mini-Series	Nominee
2007	Eight Days to Live	Gemini - Best Direction in a Dramatic Program or Mini-Series	Nominee
2004	Cowboys and Indians: The J.J. Harper Story	Gemini - Best Direction in a Dramatic Program or Mini-Series	Nominee
2000	The Sheldon Kennedy Story	Gemini - Best Direction in a Dramatic Program or Mini-Series	Nominee
1987	Ikwe	Gemini - Best Pay TV Dramatic Program or Series	Winner
1987	Ikwe	Gemini - Best Direction in a Dramatic Program or Mini-Series	Nominee

=== Bijou Awards ===
Year	Title	Award	Result
1981	Nose and Tina	Best Documentary Under 30 Minutes	Winner
1981	Nose and Tina	Best Director of a Documentary	Winner
