= Theseus (AUV) =

Large autonomous underwater vehicle for laying fibre-optic cable

Theseus is a large autonomous underwater vehicle (AUV) designed for laying fibre-optic cable on the seafloor.

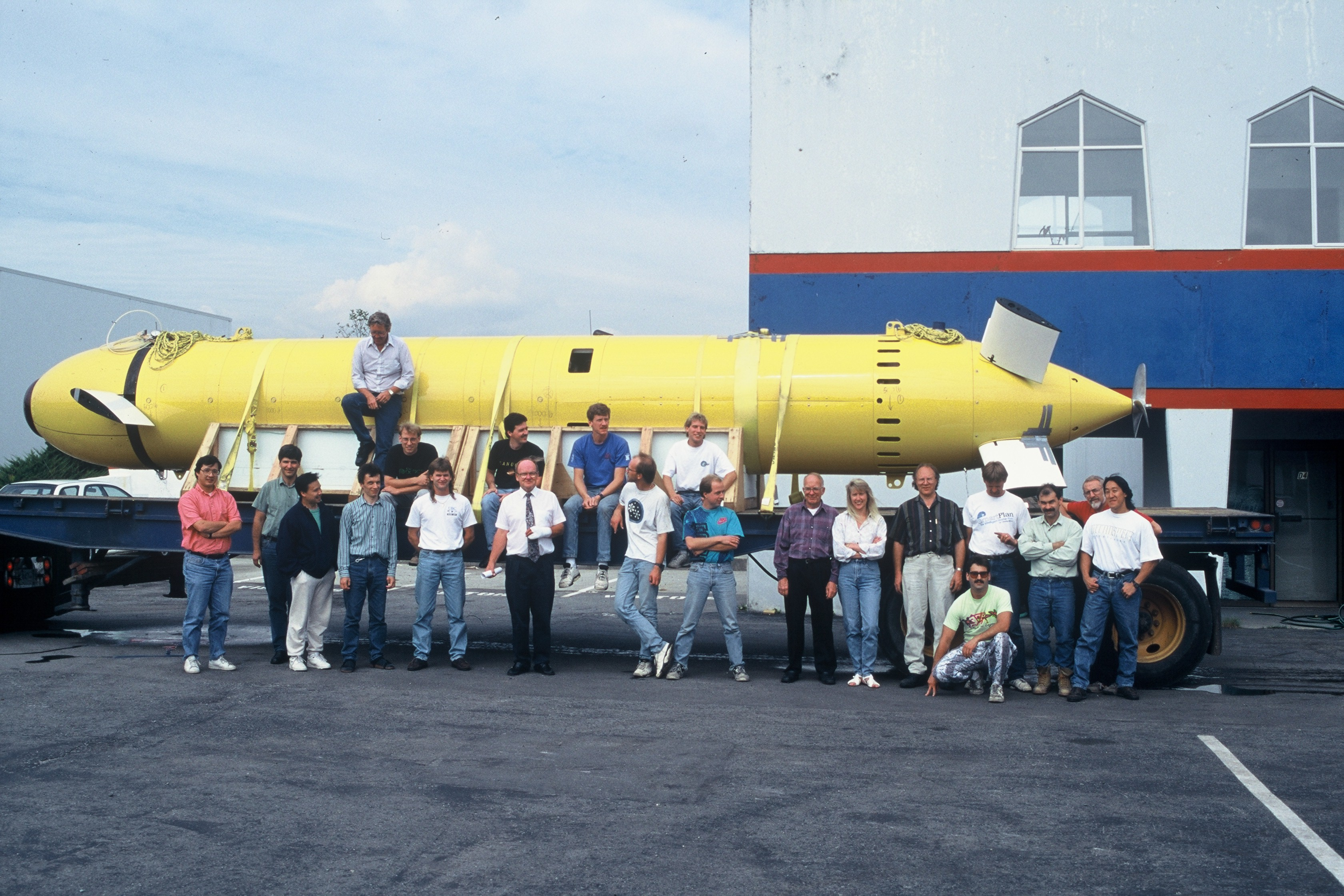

== History ==
In 1987, the Canadian government released a long-awaited white paper on defence; one of the key points in this paper was Canada's commitment to maintaining sovereignty over its Arctic waters, through both the acquisition of nuclear submarines and advances in passive subsea surveillance techniques.

Project Spinnaker was a defence research project initiated to develop the technologies needed to deploy acoustic listening posts on the seafloor in Canada's Arctic Archipelago. These arrays needed to be deployed in deep waters on the edge of the Continental Shelf; since these waters were ice-covered year round, a novel solution was needed to lay trunk cables from on-shore data processing centres out to the arrays.

Project Spinnaker was the brainchild of the Defense Research Establishment Pacific (DREP), a defence research laboratory specializing in Arctic acoustics. To help solve the cable-laying problem, DREP turned to International Submarine Engineering Ltd, of Port Coquitlam, BC.

Feasibility studies began in 1988, using ISE's ARCS AUV as a test platform. In 1990, ARCS autonomously laid fibre-optic cable on the seafloor off Port Moody, BC, validating the concept of using an AUV to lay cable.

Design of the Theseus AUV began in 1991, with construction following from 1993 to 1994. Theseus began sea trials in the summer of 1994 and was deployed to the Arctic in the spring of 1995 and the spring of 1996.

== Operation ==
Theseus was first deployed to the Arctic in the spring of 1995 to validate transportation logistics, confirm vehicle operations, and to develop cable delivery and recovery techniques. At ISE's headquarters in Port Coquitlam, Theseus was broken down into modular sections, flown to CFS Alert in C-130 Hercules aircraft, then slung by helicopter out to Jolliffe Bay where it was re-assembled under a large heated tent. A large ice hole, 40’ x 5’ was cut through the 6-foot-thick ice cover, and Theseus was launched and recovered horizontally, performing several under-ice test missions.

In the spring of 1996, Theseus was deployed back to Jolliffe Bay for a full-length cable-laying mission in support of Project Spinnaker. An acoustic array was deployed on the seafloor on the edge of the Continental Shelf approximately 180 kilometres from shore, and Theseus successfully delivered the cable to the array after just over 24 hours of running. Theseus was then commanded to return to Jolliffe Bay, which it did.

A second cable laying mission was also performed, out to another array. This mission was not successful, as the trunk cable broke half-way into the mission. However, Theseus completed the cable delivery maneuvers and was subsequently sent on its way back to Jolliffe Bay.

== Construction ==
=== Hull ===
The overall hull was 10.7m long (35 feet), a diameter of 1.27m (50 inches), with a displacement of 8600 kg (19,000 lbs). It was designed in a modular fashion, so it could be broken down for transport by helicopter or Twin Otter aircraft.

The bow section was free-flooding and contained the obstacle avoidance sonar, forward variable ballast tank/pump, acoustic telemetry transducer, and strobe lights.

The pressure hull consisted of 6 modular hull sections, and contained the batteries, electronics, and dry sensors.

The payload bay contained the fibre-optic cable packs.

The tail section housed the aft variable ballast tank/pump and thruster.

Six electrically operated dive planes (2 at the bow, 4 at the stern) provide control and stability in the pitch, roll, and yaw axes.

=== Propulsion ===
A single, 61 cm propeller was driven by a 6 hp brushless DC motor and gearbox. This allowed for operation at a nominal speed of 2 m/s (4 knots).

=== Navigation ===
Theseus navigated using a hybrid inertial/acoustic positioning system. For dead-reckoning positioning from the launch ice hole, a Honeywell MAPS ring laser gyroscope was loosely coupled with an EDO 3050 Doppler Velocity Log, providing a position accuracy of approximately 0.5% of distance travelled.

For mid-mission course correction and terminal guidance for cable delivery, a Datasonics ACU-206 acoustic positioning system was operated in an inverted USBL mode to measure range and bearing to ORE 6701 low-frequency acoustic transponders deployed at key locations along the mission route.

=== Obstacle Avoidance ===
A Sonatech STA-013-1 TOAS obstacle detection sonar was mounted in the bow of the vehicle, providing a ±25° horizontal x ±9° high field of view to detect ice keels and bottom obstacles out to a range of 180 metres. Detection and avoidance control software was not completed in time for the cable laying mission, so for the outbound mission, a manual obstacle avoidance control function was available (but never used) over the fibre-optic cable.

=== Control ===
The onboard mission computer was a Gespac-based MC68030 processor running Proteus, a proprietary real-time kernel. The mission-specific application software was written in C++ with a layered architecture and subsumption, cooperation, and supervision hierarchy.

=== Payload ===
A dedicated hull section contained 11 spools of fibre-optic cable spliced together providing 220 km of cable available for dispensing. Each spool was surrounded by a toroidal buoyancy compensation tank that was filled as cable was dispensed.

=== Energy ===
Theseus was powered by Yardney silver-zinc secondary cells; 280 individual cells arranged in 6 battery boxes and providing 360 kWh, enough for a 450 km mission and 24 additional hours of hotel load (and a safety factor of 1.25).

=== Communications ===
Four modes are available for communications between the Theseus onboard computer system and an operator console, depending on the operations mode:

- Tether: serial communications, used for in-shop and on-deck diagnostics
- Radio: a Dataradio 9600bit/s radio was used for local sea trials (towing a surface antenna) down to 5m depth
- Fibre optic: optical mux providing bi-directional communications over the trunk cable being laid (outbound mission only)
- Acoustic: Datasonics ATM-851 (15-20 kHz MFSK)
