= Lally Cadeau =

Canadian actress (b.1948)

- Born: Alice Mary Cadeau; 10 January 1948 (age 78); Burlington, Ontario, Canada
- Occupation: Actress
- Years active: 1958–present
- Spouse: Robin Weatherstone
- Children: 3

Lally Cadeau (born Alice Mary Cadeau, 10 January 1948) is a Canadian stage, television, film, and radio actress.

== Life and career ==
Alice Mary Cadeau was born in Burlington, Ontario, the youngest child and only daughter of a once-aspiring actress from Hamilton and a French-Canadian from Penetanguishene. Her father died when she was 6 years old. She attended Stoneleigh-Prospect Hill School for girls in Greenfield, Massachusetts; Edenhall Convent of the Sacred Heart in Philadelphia; and Havergal College in Toronto. Cadeau appeared as Elizabeth Rex at age 10 with the Hamilton Players Guild, and when 13 in Terrence Rattigan's Five Finger Exercise. She studied under Dora Mavor Moore.

A perennial stage, television, film and radio actress, she has been a mainstay with the Stratford Festival since 1997. She was in two television series, the CBC's Hangin' In and Sullivan Entertainment's Road to Avonlea. Since 1980, she has been the recipient of many nominations and awards, including a Bijou, a Genie, two Geminis, and two Dora Mavor Moore awards. These were for her work in Harvest, You've Come a Long Way, Katie, Road to Avonlea, and the stage plays Saturday, Sunday, Monday and Rose. Her work for the Stratford Festival has included the roles of Filumena, Juno Boyle, Jean Brodie, Mrs. van Damm, The Duchess of York, The Nurse and Lottie Childs.

== Personal life ==
Cadeau was married to Robin Weatherstone (d. 2018), with whom she had two sons, Christopher, and Bennet. She also had a daughter, Sara Brooke Cadeau, from a previous relationship.

== Filmography ==
=== Film ===
Year	Title	Role	Notes
1981	Threshold	Anita	
1983	Videodrome	Rena King	
1986	Separate Vacations	Shelley the Wife	
2000	Rats	Jean	
2005	Anne: Journey to Green Gables	Madame Poubelle (voice)	

=== Television ===
Year	Title	Role	Notes
1980	Harvest	Elizabeth	TV series
1980	Bizarre	Various	TV series
1980	You've Come a Long Way, Katie	Katie	TV miniseries
1980	Passengers		TV film
1980	King of Kensington	Nurse	Episode: "Counter Attack"
1981–1987	Hangin' In	Kate Brown	Main role
1983	Between Friends	Lolly	TV film
1985	Kane and Abel	Maisie	TV miniseries
1987	Adderly	Gilda	Episode: "Run to Darkness"
1988	Street Legal	Aileen Prouse	Episode: "The Homecoming"
1989	The Twilight Zone	Becky Robb	Episode: "Something in the Walls"
1990	Under the Umbrella Tree	Aunt Bonnie	Episode: "Thanksgiving"
1990–1996	Road to Avonlea	Janet King	Main role
1991	Rupert	Mrs. Bear (voice)	Recurring role
1992	Deadly Matrimony	Hannah Klein	TV film
1992–1997	X-Men	Dr. Moira MacTaggert and Phalanx Nexus (voice)	Recurring role
1996	Rossini's Ghost	Elder Martina	TV film
1998	Silver Surfer	Lady Chaos (voice)	Episode: "The End of Eternity: Part 2"
1998	Happy Christmas, Miss King	Janet King	TV film
1998–2000	Mythic Warriors: Guardians of the Legend	Athena (voice)	Recurring role
2006	Booky Makes Her Mark	Lucy Maud Montgomery	TV film
2006	ReGenesis	Judge	Episode: "The Wild and the Innocent"
2006	Why I Wore Lipstick to My Mastectomy	Geralyn's Mom	TV film
2007	Peep and the Big Wide World	Spider (voice)	Episode: I Spy a Spider
2010	Murdoch Mysteries	Lady Minerva	Episode: "Blood and Circuses"
