= On Guard for Thee =

- Written by: Donald Brittain
- Directed by: Donald Brittain
- Country of origin: Canada
- Original language: English
- No. of seasons: 1
- No. of episodes: 3

Production
- Executive producers: Adam Symansky (NFB); Paul Wright (CBC)
- Running time: 60 minutes

Original release
- Network: CBC Television
- Release: 18 October – 1 November 1981

On Guard for Thee is a Canadian documentary television miniseries that aired on CBC Television in 1981.

== Premise ==
This series concerns the history and status of Canadian national security following World War II, particularly the national security role which the Royal Canadian Mounted Police held until the formation of the Canadian Security Intelligence Service in 1984. Episodes included historic footage, dramatized reconstructions, excerpts from the 1948 motion picture The Iron Curtain and new interview footage. It was a co-production of the National Film Board of Canada and CBC.

== Scheduling ==
This hour-long series was broadcast Sundays at 10:00 p.m. as follows:

1. 18 October 1981: "The Most Dangerous Spy" features Igor Gouzenko who defected to Canada in 1946 and revealed Soviet Union spy activities in Canada
2. 25 October 1981: "A Blanket Of Ice" regards the Cold War, with investigations of the diplomatic and public service sectors, and RCMP secret operations up to the 1970 October Crisis
3. 1 November 1981: "Shadows Of A Horseman" features the actions and controversies of the RCMP since the McKenzie Commission report of 1969 which recommended that national security operations be separated from the RCMP, and the 1977 establishment of the McDonald Commission
