= Timothy Findley: Anatomy of a Writer =

- Genre: Documentary
- Directed by: Terence Macartney-Filgate
- Starring: Timothy Findley; William Hutt; Martha Henry; Susan Coyne
- Country of origin: Canada
- Original language: English

Production
- Producers: Terence Macartney-Filgate; Silva Basmajian; Don Haig; Dennis R. Murphy
- Cinematography: Terence Macartney-Filgate
- Editor: Darryl Cornford
- Running time: 58 minutes
- Production company: National Film Board of Canada

Original release
- Network: CBC Television
- Release: January 30, 1992

Timothy Findley: Anatomy of a Writer is a Canadian television documentary film, directed by Terence Macartney-Filgate and released in 1992. The film is a portrait of writer Timothy Findley, featuring both interview segments and scenes which try to illuminate his creative process by dramatizing several rewritten variations on his then-forthcoming theatrical play The Stillborn Lover as acted by William Hutt, Martha Henry and Susan Coyne.

The film was broadcast on CBC Television on January 30, 1992, as an episode of Adrienne Clarkson Presents.

The film won the Donald Brittain Award for best social or political documentary at the 7th Gemini Awards in 1993.
