= Robbie Ross =

British journalist and art critic; lover of Oscar Wilde (1869–1918)

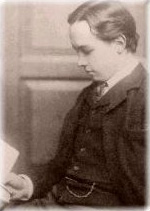
- Robert Ross at twenty-four
- Born: Robert Baldwin Ross; 25 May 1869; Tours, France
- Died: 5 October 1918 (aged 49); London, England
- Other name: Robbie Ross
- Occupation: Journalist
- Known for: Executor of the estate of Oscar Wilde

Robert Baldwin Ross (25 May 1869 – 5 October 1918) was a British journalist, art critic and art dealer, best known for his relationship with Oscar Wilde, to whom he was a devoted friend, lover and literary executor. A grandson of the Canadian reform leader Robert Baldwin, and son of John Ross and Augusta Elizabeth Baldwin, Ross was a pivotal figure on the London literary and artistic scene from the mid-1890s to his early death, and mentored several literary figures, including Siegfried Sassoon. His open homosexuality, in a period when male homosexual acts were illegal, brought him many hardships.

== Biography ==
=== Family ===
Ross was born in Tours, France. His mother, Elizabeth Baldwin, was the eldest daughter of Robert Baldwin, a Toronto lawyer and politician who in the 1840s, together with his political partner Louis Hippolyte Lafontaine, led Canada to autonomy from Britain. Ross's father, John Ross, was a Baldwinite and a Toronto lawyer who had a very successful political career, serving as Solicitor General for Upper Canada, Attorney General, Speaker of the Legislative Council, President of the Legislative Council, director, and, for a time, president, of the Grand Trunk Railway, and Canadian senator. He became Speaker of the Senate in 1869.

Ross was the youngest of five children, with two sisters, Mary and Maria, and two brothers, John and Alexander. The family moved to Tours, France, in 1866 while Elizabeth was pregnant with Maria, who was born in 1867, the year of Canadian Confederation. John fulfilled his duties as senator largely in absentia until he was chosen as Speaker of the Senate in 1869, the year of Robbie's birth, making his return to Canada unavoidable. The rest of the family followed in 1870. John died in January 1871 and Elizabeth moved the family to London the following April.

=== At Cambridge ===
In 1888, Ross was accepted at King's College, Cambridge, where he became a victim of bullying, probably because of his homosexuality, of which he made no secret, and perhaps also his outspoken journalism in the university paper. Ross caught pneumonia after being dunked in a fountain by other students who had, according to Ross, the full support of Arthur Augustus Tilley, the Junior Tutor of King's. After recovering, he fought for and received an apology from his fellow students. He also sought Tilley's dismissal. The college refused to punish Tilley, who resigned as Junior Tutor. Ross dropped out and soon revealed his sexuality to his parents.

=== Oscar Wilde ===
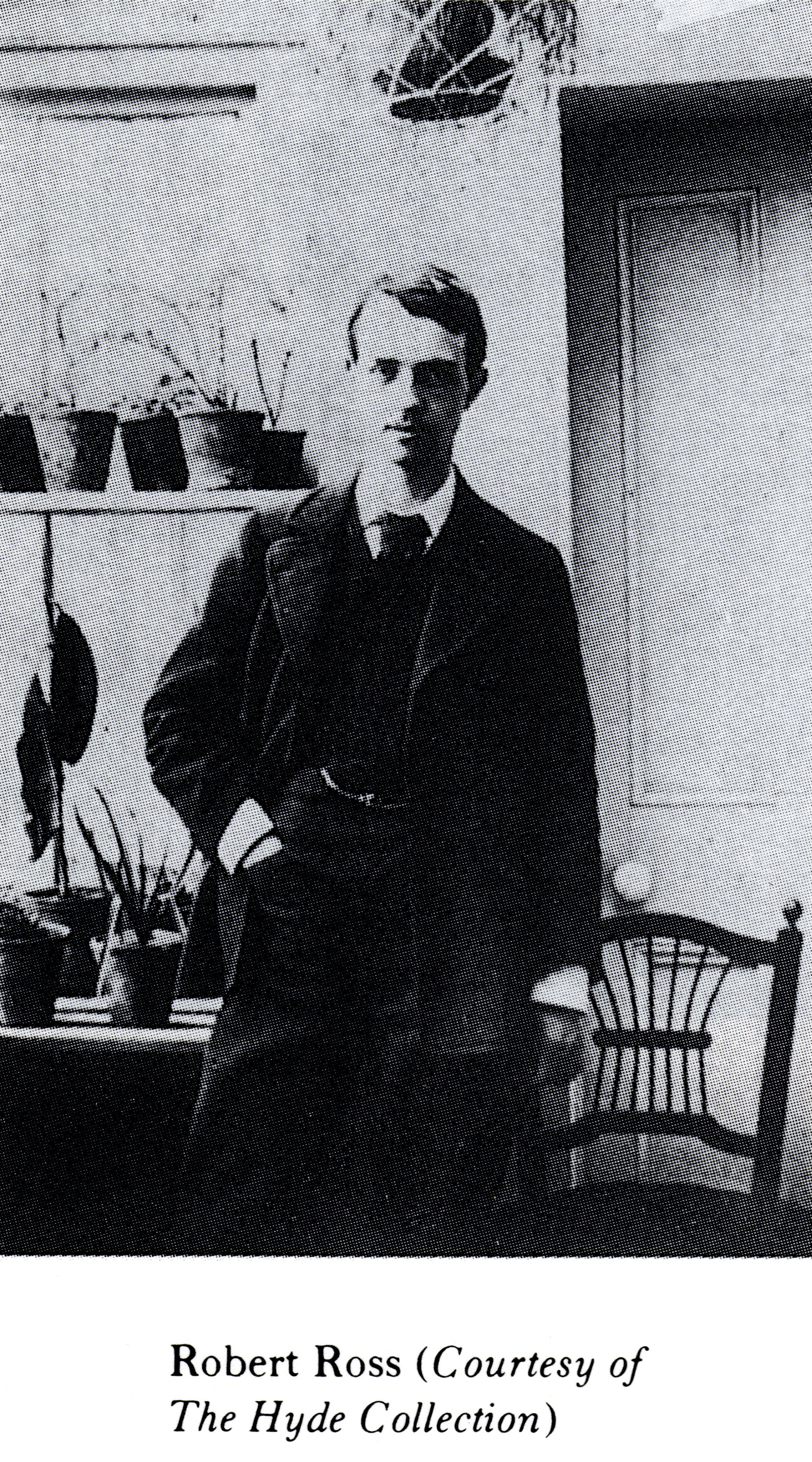
Robert Ross

Ross found work as a journalist and critic but he did not escape scandal. He is believed to have become Oscar Wilde's first male lover in 1886, even before he went to Cambridge. In 1893, a few years before Wilde's imprisonment, Ross had a sexual relationship with a boy of sixteen, the son of friends. The boy confessed to his parents that he had engaged in sexual activity with Ross and also admitted to a sexual encounter with Lord Alfred Douglas while he was a guest at Ross's house. After a good deal of panic and frantic meetings with solicitors, the parents were persuaded not to go to the police, since at that time their son might be seen as equally guilty and face the possibility of going to prison.

On 1 March 1895, Wilde, Douglas, and Ross approached a solicitor, Charles Octavius Humphreys, with the intention of suing the Marquess of Queensberry, Douglas's father, for criminal libel. Humphreys asked Wilde directly whether there was any truth to Queensberry's allegations of homosexual activity between Wilde and Douglas, to which Wilde replied "No." Humphreys applied for a warrant for Queensberry's arrest, and approached Sir Edward Clarke and Charles Willie Mathews to represent Wilde. His son, Travers Humphreys, appeared as junior counsel for the prosecution in the subsequent case of Wilde v Queensberry.

The libel hearings unearthed evidence that caused Wilde to drop his charges and led to an arrest warrant for him on charges of sodomy and gross indecency. Ross found Wilde at the Cadogan Hotel, in Knightsbridge, with Reginald Turner. Both men advised Wilde to get a boat-train to France, but he refused. His mother had advised him to stay and fight, and Wilde reportedly said: "The train has gone. It's too late." Following Wilde's imprisonment in 1895, Ross went abroad but he returned to offer both financial and emotional support to Wilde during his last years. Ross remained loyal to Wilde and was with him when he died in Paris on 30 November 1900.

=== After Oscar Wilde ===
Ross became Wilde's literary executor, which meant that he had to track down and purchase the rights to all of Wilde's texts, which had been sold off along with Wilde's possessions when Wilde was declared bankrupt. It also meant fighting the rampant trade in black market copies of his books and, in particular, books, usually erotic, that Wilde did not write, but which were published illegally under his name.

Ross was assisted in this task by Christopher Sclater Millard, who compiled a definitive bibliography of Wilde's writings. Ross gave Wilde's sons the rights to all their father's works along with the money earned from their publication or performance while he was executor. In 1905, he attended the first performances in England of Wilde's Salome at the Bijou Theatre. One of the actors was Frederick Stanley Smith (1885–1953), with whom Ross had a relationship.

About 1902, he arranged for the transfer of Wilde's remains "from the obscure Bagneux cemetery to Père Lachaise, the most celebrated cemetery in France", and later instructed his heirs to have his own ashes buried in Wilde's tomb.

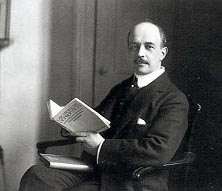
Robert Baldwin Ross, 1911

In 1908, some years after Wilde's death, Ross produced the definitive edition of his works. Ross was also responsible for commissioning Jacob Epstein to produce the sculpture that can now be seen on Wilde's tomb. He even requested that Epstein design a small compartment for Ross's own ashes. As a result of his faithfulness to Wilde even in death, Ross was vindictively pursued by Lord Alfred Douglas, who repeatedly attempted to have him arrested and tried for homosexual conduct.

From 1901 to 1908, in personal and professional partnership with the art critic More Adey, Ross managed the Carfax Gallery, a small commercial gallery in London co-founded by John Fothergill and the artist William Rothenstein. The Carfax held exhibitions of works by such artists as Aubrey Beardsley, William Blake, Sylvia Gosse, and John Singer Sargent. After leaving the Carfax, Ross worked as an art critic for The Morning Post.

During the First World War, Ross mentored a group of young, mostly homosexual, poets and artists including Siegfried Sassoon and Wilfred Owen. He was also a close friend of Wilde's sons Vyvyan Holland and Cyril Holland.

In early 1918, during the German spring offensive, Noel Pemberton Billing, a right-wing member of Parliament, published an article entitled "The Cult of the Clitoris" in which he accused members of Ross's circle of being among 47,000 homosexuals who were betraying the nation to the Germans. Maud Allan, an actress who had played Wilde's Salome in a performance authorised by Ross, was identified as a member of the "cult". She unsuccessfully sued Billing for libel, causing a national sensation in Britain. The incident brought embarrassing attention to Ross and his associates.

Ross died suddenly on 5 October 1918 in London where he was preparing to travel to Melbourne to open an exhibition at the National Gallery of Victoria.

In 1950, on the 50th anniversary of Wilde's death, an urn containing Ross's ashes was placed into Wilde's tomb in Père Lachaise Cemetery in Paris.

== Ross's work ==
Ross was able to rely on an allowance and then an inheritance from his wealthy family, leaving him free to pursue his interests. His main contribution to literature lies in his work, not only as Wilde's executor, but also, earlier, as a friendly but critical reader of many of Wilde's texts. If Ross is to be believed, he frequently suggested changes and improvements.

Ross also tried his hand as a writer. He provided an introduction to Wilde's play Salome. His book Masques and Phases is a collection of previously published short stories and reviews. As an art critic, Ross was highly critical of the post-impressionist painters. Ross also wrote a book about Aubrey Beardsley.

== Appearances in media ==
- Florence Earle Coates dedicated her poem To R. R.: On Rereading the "De Profundis" of Oscar Wilde (1912) to him.
- Ross has a brief appearance in the Pat Barker novel The Eye in the Door. His part in Noel Pemberton Billing's agitation against him and his circle is mentioned throughout as a backdrop to the main story.
- The protagonist of Timothy Findley's novel The Wars (1977) is named after him. The historical Ross appears as a character in Findley's novel Pilgrim.
- In films he has been portrayed by Dennis Price in Oscar Wilde (1960), Emrys Jones in The Trials of Oscar Wilde (1960), Michael Sheen in Wilde (1997), Edwin Thomas in The Happy Prince (2018), and by Simon Russell Beale in Benediction (2022).
- Ross is a major character in David Hare's play The Judas Kiss (1998).
- Robert Ross has a major role in Dave Sim's graphic novel Melmoth, which chronicles the final days and death of Wilde.
