= Hardee T. Lineham =

Canadian actor

- Occupation: Actor
- Awards: Dora Mavor Moore Award for Best Leading Actor (General Theatre) (1993)

Hardee T. Lineham is a Canadian actor. He is most noted for his performance in the 1996 film Shoemaker, for which he was a Genie Award nominee for Best Supporting Actor at the 18th Genie Awards in 1997.

Most prominently a stage actor, he won the Dora Mavor Moore Award for Best Leading Actor (General Theatre) in 1993 for Canadian Stage's production of Richard III. He was previously nominated in the same category in 1981 for The Crackwalker. His other stage roles have included Sean Harris in the original Factory Theatre production of George F. Walker's Love and Anger, and Daniel Jackman in the original Grand Theatre production of Timothy Findley's The Stillborn Lover.

He has also appeared in the films Wild Horse Hank, The Wars and Pale Saints, and had a regular television role as Carey in The Jane Show.
