= The Wars =

Book by Timothy Findley

- First edition
- Author: Timothy Findley
- Language: English
- Publisher: Clarke, Irwin
- Publication date: 1977
- Publication place: Canada
- Pages: 226
- ISBN: 0-7720-1188-5 (first edition)
- OCLC: 3689735
- Dewey Decimal: 813/.5/4
- LC Class: PZ4.F494 War PR9199.3.F52
- Preceded by: The Butterfly Plague
- Followed by: Famous Last Words

The Wars is a 1977 novel by Timothy Findley that follows Robert Ross, a nineteen-year-old Canadian who enlists in World War I after the death of his beloved older sister in an attempt to escape both his grief and the social norms of oppressive Edwardian society. Drawn into the madness of war, Ross commits "a last desperate act to declare his commitment to life in the midst of death." Years later, a historian tries to piece together how he came to commit this act, interviewing the various people Ross interacted with.

== Style ==
The Wars utilizes first-, second-, and third-person narrative points of view, which is very rare in literature. The narrative moves between voices, each telling part of Robert's story.

The novel is also an example of historiographic metafiction.

== Plot summary ==
=== Prologue ===
A young man named Robert Ross is introduced as squatting in a tattered Canadian military uniform, with a pistol in hand. A nearby building is on fire, and a train is stopped. There is evidence of war, and Ross is shown to be in the company of a black horse and a dog. Robert, the horse, and the dog seem to have been together for a while, as they understand each other. He decides to free a herd of horses from the train, and the prologue ends with the horses, rider, and dog all running as a herd.

=== Part One ===
Robert Ross enlists in the army to escape the guilt he feels after the recent death of his sister, Rowena, who died from falling out of her wheelchair while playing with her beloved rabbits in the barn. Robert feels guilty because he was unable to save her since he was making love to his pillows in his bedroom when he should have been watching her. His mother orders Robert to kill the rabbits after Rowena's death; when he refuses, his father hires Teddy Budge to kill the rabbits. In an attempt to stop Teddy, Robert is beaten up. Later, while he soaks the resulting bruises in the bathtub, Robert's mother comes in to talk to him. Drunk and visibly upset, she says that she knows Robert wants to go to war, and she accepts that she cannot stop him.

Robert goes to army training. There, he meets Eugene Taffler, a lauded war hero. Taffler shows him how to break bottles with stones, prompting Robert to think of him as David throwing stones at Goliath. Robert then goes with his soldiers-in-training to a brothel named Wet Goods. He goes into a room with the prostitute Ella; when she realizes that he has accidentally ejaculated in his pants and therefore will not be having sex, she decides to pass the time by showing him a peephole into the next room. Here Robert sees Taffler having sadomasochistic sex with another man. Out of anger, Robert throws his boots at a mirror and a water jug, scaring Ella.

While sailing to England on the S.S. Massanabie, Robert must kill a horse that broke its leg. While struggling to kill the horse, he fires and misses many times before landing his shots.

=== Part Two ===
Robert is now in France and in charge of a convoy. While scouting ahead in the fog, he falls into a muddy sinkhole and nearly drowns. After saving himself, he is met by Poole and Levitt, two of his men. They eventually reach the dugout that will be their temporary home. There, they meet the three other men that live in the dugout: Devlin, Bonnycastle, and Rodwell.

Rodwell cares for injured animals he finds: birds, rabbits, toads, and hedgehogs. The rabbits painfully remind Robert of Rowena. However, Robert manages to build a bond with Rodwell, the only other civil soldier who cares and respects animals.

Robert remembers Harris, another soldier whom he had befriended on the ship when both fell ill. On land, Harris died two days before Robert was scheduled to leave for France. It is during their time in the infirmary together that Robert and Harris meet Taffler again. After Harris dies, Robert asks Taffler to help him in burying his friend. However, Robert learns that Harris has already been cremated. Disappointed by this turn of events, Robert and Taffler dump the ashes into the sea. Robert says, "This is not a military funeral. This is just a burial at sea. May we take off our caps?"

On February 28, 1916, the Germans set off a string of land mines, strategically placed along the St. Eloi Salient. The whole countryside goes up in flames. This is the second half of a battle that the Canadians thought was already over. "30,000 men would die and not an inch of land would be won."

=== Part Three ===
Robert is now experiencing trench warfare at its worst. Following a shelling of the dugout, his fellow soldier Levitt loses his mind, and Robert finds himself close to the brink.

Ordered to place guns in a location sure to be a deathtrap, Robert and his men find themselves on the wrong end of a gas attack in the middle of a freezing cold winter. Robert is instructed to place the guns in a crater that is formed by the shelling attacks. As he descends the side of crater, Robert slips and smashes his knees on a discarded machine gun, creatin? the men start descending the side of crater, there is a sudden gas attack. The bottom of the crater is full of freezing water, and many begin jumping into it. Robert takes control with his pistol and instructs the men to urinate on strips of clothing and hold them over their faces. One man is too scared to urinate, and Robert must do it for him. The men then lie down, feigning death. Hours later, Robert finally sits up and surveys their surroundings. He immediately realizes that they are being watched by an enemy German soldier sitting at the lip of the crater. Rather than shooting the soldiers, the German allows all of Robert's men to escape the crater. Just as Robert is leaving, however, the German makes a quick motion, and Robert shoots the German. Thinking that the German had been reaching for his rifle, Robert is shocked when he realizes that the German was only reaching for a pair of binoculars to look at the bird flying overhead; Robert is even more horrified to see that the German had had a sniper rifle, meaning that he could have killed Robert and his men if he had wanted to. Robert hears a bird chirping above him and, from then on, is haunted by the sound.

=== Part Four ===
In an interview, Juliet d'Orsey explains that the d'Orsey home was converted into a hospital for soldiers during the war. It is here that Robert recovers from his own injuries sustained in Part Three. Once again he meets Taffler, another patient at the d'Orsey home; Robert is devastated to find that Taffler has lost both of his arms in the war. While Taffler seems to be in good spirits, he ends up attempting suicide; one day, as Juliet comes into Taffler's room to give him some flowers, she finds him trying to rub his raw arm stumps against the walls and subsequently bleed to death. Various people, including Robert, respond to Juliet's screams, and Taffler is saved.

Juliet tells Robert that his assigned room is haunted by the ghost Lady Sorrel, who comes into the room every night and lights the candles. One night, Juliet thinks it would be a neat prank to dress up as Lady Sorrel, walk into Robert's room, and light the candles. When Juliet opens the door, she sees her older sister Barbara and Robert Ross having sex, so violently that Juliet at first thinks that Robert is hurting Barbara. Although they do not see who opens the door, Juliet begins to feel guilty. When Robert eventually leaves the home, Juliet slips him a candle and a box of matches in an effort to explain herself and apologize.

=== Part Five ===
Robert heads back to battle on a small train. He gets hopelessly lost on the way and loses his pack. After many weeks of travelling in circles, he arrives at Désolé, a mental institution. In the bath house, he is brutally raped by four men. Although he assumes that they are patients of the institution, he is horrified to learn that they are fellow soldiers. When he returns to his room, he finally receives his lost pack. He burns his only picture of Rowena, as an act of charity, reasoning that it would be horrible for something so innocent to exist in such a perverse world.

Robert then returns to the front. The Germans begin firing shells. Robert asks Captain Leather to let the horses out of the barn, as they will die if the barn is hit, but Captain Leather refuses. Robert returns to the barn and asks his friend Devlin to help him release the horses. As Devlin runs out to open the gate, Captain Leather comes out of hiding and shoots Devlin dead. He then fires at Robert but misses. At that moment, three shells land. Soon everything is burning around Robert; even the horses are slowly burning alive. Robert finds Captain Leather and shoots him dead.

Robert runs away, as he knows he will be court-martialed for disobeying orders. He finds a black horse with a black dog beside an abandoned train. Before riding the horse down the track, he realizes that there are horses in the train. He frees 130 horses from the train and flees the area with them. As Robert is riding with all the horses, a soldier stops him and tries to force him to return the horses; Robert shoots him dead.

Robert is finally caught in a barn with the horses. The soldiers surrounding Robert set the barn on fire in an attempt to smoke him out. However, the doors of the barn are locked. Before Robert can open them, the roof collapses on him and the horses. Robert is saved but badly burned, and all the horses and possibly the dog are killed.

Robert turns down an offer of euthanasia from a nurse from Bois de Madeleine hospital before being sent to England and tried in absentia. Since he could not be kept in prison, he was given leave to stay in St Aubyn's for longterm treatment.

Juliet d'Orsey remains by Robert's side until his death in 1922. Mr. Ross is the only member of his family to come see Robert buried.

== Characters ==
=== Robert Ross ===
The character of protagonist Robert Ross was inspired by T. E. Lawrence and the author's uncle, Thomas Irving Findley, to whom the author dedicated the novel. Findley named the character after Canadian literary figure Robbie Ross.

Robert Ross enlisted when he was eighteen and served as a second lieutenant in the Canadian field artillery from 1916-1917.

He is a compassionate, handsome fellow. He is also an idealist, hindered by youth and inexperience. Robert's personality is serious, practical, determined, and observant of things that other people cannot see. His observations also allow him to react quickly to the situations he encounters in this novel. Robert suffers great guilt over the accidental death of his sister, Rowena, who died from a fall onto cement ground in the barn. After Rowena's death, Robert became distant from his mother and much closer to his father, who continued to support and encourage him throughout his experience in the war.

Rowena's death also leaves him with violent streaks and leads an internal war with himself while also trying to cope with the war going on in the world. Even though Robert is determined, he was not a natural killer; this weakness was seen in his inability to kill the injured horse or Rowena's rabbits. Robert strove to learn from Eugene Taffler, whom Robert hoped could help teach him to kill by example. After all the terrible things Robert witnesses, he gradually descends into madness, and goes AWOL. He kills two fellow officers in an attempt to save hundreds of horses from slaughter.

He dies of his war wounds several years after the war ends.

=== Rowena Ross ===
Rowena is Robert's older sister, with whom Robert felt a connection from a very early age. She was hydrocephalic, meaning she was born with water in the brain. This caused her to have an adult-sized head but a body of a ten-year-old, and made her unable to walk. Robert acted as her guardian for most of his life. She was 25 years old when she fell out of her wheelchair onto the concrete floor of their barn and died as a result. Robert took it as his duty to protect her, but Robert was in his room masturbating when she fell out of her chair. Thus, he feels guilty throughout the novel for inadvertently causing her death. She remains in Robert's heart and mind throughout the novel and is constantly referenced.

Rowena had ten rabbits that she looked after and kept as pets while she was alive, but Mrs. Ross insisted that they be killed, against Robert's wishes, shortly after Rowena's death. Robert's desperate attempts to save animals throughout his war experiences reflects his love for the dead animal-loving sister.

The character of Rowena was inspired by Mary Macdonald, daughter of Prime Minister John A. Macdonald, who was similarly afflicted with hydrocephalus.

=== Thomas Ross ===
Commonly referred to as Mr. Ross in the novel, he is the wealthy father of protagonist Robert Ross. He was the more lenient parent in the family and loved every member enough to encourage Robert to go for what he wants while withstanding the accusations surrounding Rowena's death. His relationship with his wife became helpless after Rowena's death and Robert's enlisting in the army. He has a strong relationship with his son Robert, and he is the only member of the family to attend Robert's funeral.

=== Marian Turner ===
Marian Turner is a young nurse during the war. She cares for Robert when he is injured late in the novel, but the reader is introduced to her earlier. Via transcripts of interviews, an 80-year-old Marian gives accounts of what Robert was like as a young man, and of life during the war.

=== Lady Juliet d'Orsey ===
Juliet d'Orsey gives an account of Robert, whom she knew at the age of twelve and for whom she had romantic feelings. She is Barbara d'Orsey's younger sister, who saw too much and acted too maturely for her age. She seems to be the only character who understands the delicate homoerotic undertones in male friendships without being confused or disturbed by them.

=== Lady Barbara d'Orsey ===
This lady is Juliet's older sister, who became Robert's lover at a point in the novel. She was uncaring and moved easily from one man to another. She admired athletes and heroes. She constantly frustrated the delicate homoerotic relationships around her without understanding her own destructiveness.

=== Eugene Taffler ===
This man was a war hero who was often accompanied by a dog and a horse. From the very beginning when he is first introduced, he plays the game of hitting bottles off of posts with stones, displaying strength and perfect accuracy. This reflects Taffler's reputation in the war as a soldier who kills as though it were some kind of game.

He later loses his arms. When Taffler loses his arms he no longer wants to live because his arms were so much a part of him and his identity that without them he doesn't have the will to live. He attempts suicide, by rubbing his stubs against the wall, but is thwarted by Lady Juliet d'Orsey. Taffler's reputation and self-image are linked closely with his arms. First as he's introduced using them to hit bottles with stones, and even later when he helps Robert toss Harris's ashes into the river.

Taffler is a complex character because although when introduced, Robert makes Taffler his model of masculinity. Later, upon discovering him having sex with the Swede, Robert's homophobia causes him to cease regarding Taffler as a role model. Nevertheless, Taffler goes on to have a seemingly heterosexual relationship with Barbara d'Orsey. It is also noteworthy that Robert himself may have been struggling with his own homosexual tendencies.

=== Harris ===
Robert meets Harris in the ship's infirmary. Harris's condition grows progressively worse while in England and he eventually dies before being sent off to France. While under Robert's care at a hospital, Harris talks at great length of his love of the sea. Robert describes Harris as someone he loved deeply.

== Analysis ==
=== Introduction by Guy Vanderhaeghe (2005) ===
In Penguin's Modern Classic edition, published 2005, Canadian author Guy Vanderhaeghe wrote the “Introduction” for The Wars. Vanderhaeghe describes his first experience reading the novel on the “last leg of a long bus trip.” Vanderhaeghe states that he could not stop reading and, upon finishing the book, he was "strangely exalted and disturbed by an encounter with a novel harrowing and uplifting, a novel that was both a marvelous work of art and a passionate indictment of the first cruel idiocy of the twentieth century." Vanderhaeghe also sets The Wars in the context of other works of historical war fiction. His main distinction between The Wars and works like War and Peace, The Naked and the Dead, From Here to Eternity, For Whom the Bell Tolls, and A Farewell to Arms is the compressed size of The Wars, usually being under two hundred pages (depending on the edition). Vanderhaeghe points towards Erich Maria Remarque's All Quiet on the Western Front as being perhaps the only other work to "so efficiently compress and crystallize the horrors of combat in so few pages." Vanderhaeghe continues, however, that "But unlike Remarque, Findley achieves this impressive economy by piecing together a collage of arresting images and brief, telling scenes that not only cohere in a compelling narrative but whose form mimics the fractured lives of soldiers and civilians shattered by war."

Throughout his introduction, Vanderhaeghe also argues that "The Wars is the finest historical novel ever written by a Canadian," ending with the personal confession that "The Wars has always been, and shall remain for me, the loveliest, the most moving of novels."

=== Symbols ===
==== Wars ====
The plural "Wars" in the title implies that there are multiple conflicts within the novel. Robert's time in the army and his personal conflicts are among them, creating both external and internal struggles. Guy Vanderhaeghe, in his introduction to The Wars in Penguiern Classics 2005 edition, states that "Like the frieze of horse and dog, or the occasional glimpse of Harris's blue scarf, the wars [emphasis in original] hovers in the reader's consciousness, heard as the faintest of dire whispers. It is as impossible to boil simple meaning from these two words as it is to impute clear and unambiguous motives' for Ross's actions, or to determine how many angels can dance on the head of a pin."

The bald third-person summaries of casualties, contrasted with Robert's idealized view of war, also heighten the book's impact on readers.

==== Animals ====
Animals appear throughout the story. Among the most common or meaningful:

- Birds represent danger and often appear as a sort of warning, with an attack following every time that Robert notices that the birds have stopped singing. Birds are sometimes shown to reflect what Robert is feeling. Birds also represent life and the personal freedom for which Robert fights.
- The coyote represents the relationship between man and beast. It symbolizes companionship and loyalty, as the coyote willingly ran with Robert.
- Rabbits appear throughout the novel, most notably as the pets that Rowena kept and that Robert was told to kill after her death. Rabbits, along with Rowena, symbolize innocence and purity.
- Horses appear throughout the novel as well. Horses bring Robert to Eugene Taffler: Robert was corralling mustangs when he came across Taffler, who had returned and reenlisted in the war. The horse was often used in the novel as a means of transportation and companionship. When Robert finds a black mare while attempting to free a group of doomed military horses; this refers to the Book of Revelation, in which St. John the Divine describes a vision of a black horse whose rider is holding balances. In Robert's mind, the horses from the abandoned train represent his men, whom he had also been unable to save, as well as the last living creatures that he can attempt to protect. Horses also represent the happiness that Robert experienced before the war, as demonstrated in the old photograph of Rowena on a pony.

==== Elements ====
The four classical elements of earth, air, fire, and water are all featured in the novel. They each represent a trial that Robert Ross must overcome on his journey:

- Earth appears as the mud that almost claims Robert's life in Ypres.
- Air represents life. In the chlorine gas attack against the Allies, Robert neutralizes it with urine.
- Fire represents destruction, pain, and death. It appears as gunfire, artillery fire, and flamethrowers. Harris's body is cremated instead of being buried. Finally, the flaming barn which appears in the Prologue and in Part Five claims the lives of Robert's horses and dog.
- Water represents change: Robert takes a bath after Rowena's death; the skies are snowing at Rowena's funeral; Robert stands in the rain at the train station; the snow begins to melt when Mrs Ross leaves the church; and the war trenches are filled with rain.

==== Pistol ====
Robert's pistol is a powerful symbol of authority and security. It is also a tool with which Robert vents his violent feelings, such as when Juliet witnesses him destroying a tree with his gun.

== In other media ==
A feature film version of The Wars was released in 1983. The film was directed by Robin Phillips from a screenplay written by Findley, and starred Brent Carver as Robert Ross. It was produced by Neilsen-Ferns International.

The novel has also been adapted for the stage by Dennis Garnhum. It premiered at Theatre Calgary in September 2007.
