= The National Dream =

The National Dream may refer to:

- The National Dream (book), the 1970 Canadian book by Pierre Berton
- The National Dream (miniseries), the Canadian TV miniseries based on Pierre Berton's book
