= The Stillborn Lover =

Play by Timothy Findley

The Stillborn Lover is a theatrical play by Timothy Findley, first staged in 1993. Based in part on the true stories of Canadian diplomats E. Herbert Norman and John Watkins, the story centres on Harry Raymond, a Canadian diplomat who is being questioned after he is accused of involvement in the murder of a young man.

== Plot ==
Harry Raymond, Canada's ambassador in Moscow, and his wife Marianne, who is in the early stages of Alzheimer's-related dementia, are summoned back to Ottawa by Michael Riordan, the Minister of Foreign Affairs, where Raymond is interrogated by Royal Canadian Mounted Police officers Daniel Jackman and Greg Mahavolitch, and defended by his lawyer daughter Diana Marsden. Riordan is planning to run for the leadership of his political party following the recent announcement that incumbent Prime Minister Prescott is stepping down due to poor health; both he and his wife Juliet are anxious to avoid any taint of scandal that may ruin his path to the Prime Ministership, but the investigation takes a turn when Raymond reveals both that he is gay and that he knows the secrets that may bring Riordan's career down as well.

== Production history ==
In advance of the play's premiere, some scenes from it were acted as part of the 1992 documentary film Timothy Findley: Anatomy of a Writer.

The play had its theatrical premiere at London, Ontario's Grand Theatre in March 1993, before moving to Ottawa at the end of April for staging at the National Arts Centre. The original cast included William Hutt as Harry Raymond, Donald Davis as Michael Riordan, Martha Henry as Marianne Raymond, Patricia Collins as Juliet Riordan, Kate Trotter as Diana Marsden, Hardee T. Lineham as Daniel Jackman and Michael McManus as Greg Mahavolitch.

The play had its Toronto premiere at Theatre Passe Muraille in 1995 under the direction of Baņuta Rubess. The Passe Muraille cast included David Fox as Harry Raymond, Marion Gilsenan as Marianne Raymond, Guy Bannerman as Michael Riordan, Kate Lynch as Juliet Riordan, Sarah Orenstein as Diana Marsden, Michael Hanrahan as Daniel Jackman and Adrian Hough as Greg Mahavolitch. Following this production, the play was one of the winners of the Floyd S. Chalmers Canadian Play Award in 1996.

At the Stratford Festival in 1995, Hutt, Henry and Collins reprised their roles from the original Grand Theatre/NAC production, while James Blendick performed the role of Michael Riordan, Martha Burns played Diana Marsden, Peter Donaldson played Daniel Jackman and Paul Haddad played Greg Mahavolitch.

The play received its first American production at the Berkshire Theatre Festival in 2003, with its cast including Richard Chamberlain as Harry Raymond, Keir Dullea as Michael Riordan, Lois Nettleton as Marianne Raymond, Jessica Walter as Juliet Riordan, and Jennifer Van Dyck as Diana Marsden.

== Accolades ==
The play won the Arthur Ellis Award for Best Play in 1994, the only time in the entire history of the awards that the Crime Writers of Canada ever presented an award in that category.

== External Affairs ==
The play was adapted as a television film under the title External Affairs. The film, which aired on CBC Television in 1999, starred Victor Garber as Henry Raymond, Kenneth Welsh as Michael Riordan, Louise Marleau as Marianne Raymond, Domini Blythe as Sylvia (renamed from Juliet) Riordan, Kate Greenhouse as Diana Marsden, Henry Czerny as Daniel Jackman and Mark Lutz as Greg Mahavolitch.
