= Elizabeth Rex =

Play by Timothy Findley

- Written by: Timothy Findley
- Original language: English
- Genre: Comedy-drama
- Setting: A barn in Stratford-upon-Avon

Premiere
- Date premiered: June 29, 2000
- Place premiered: Tom Patterson Theatre; Stratford, Ontario, Canada

Elizabeth Rex is a play by Timothy Findley. It premiered in a 2000 production by the Stratford Festival. The play won the 2000 Governor General's Award for English language drama.

== Plot ==
The plot involves a meeting between Queen Elizabeth I and an actor from Shakespeare's troupe who specializes in playing women's parts (since at that time women were not allowed to act in the theatre). The Queen had summoned them to perform Much Ado About Nothing for her as a diversion from waiting for the execution for treason of a man she may have loved, the Earl of Essex. She struggles with her feelings, knowing that her whole life she has had to act like a man in order to govern, and has had to reject her passionate side in order to remain unmarried. At the same time, Ned Lowenscroft, a gay man, has had to act like a woman in order to succeed in his profession, and conceal his passionate side since, being gay, his love is forbidden. He is currently mourning a soldier whom he loved, but who also gave him syphilis. His syphilis gives him skin lesions and the play hints that they are analogous to Kaposi's sarcoma of the modern day. The Queen rejects the idea that she should mourn, while Ned very much wishes to mourn and have his sorrow acknowledged.

This play takes place in two different barns on the night before the execution of the earl of Essex. There is a curfew on that night because the authorities are afraid that there will be riots. William Shakespeare is a supporting character in the play, writing down lines and exchanges between the characters that appear in his later plays, but not interacting much otherwise.

One of the play's central themes is challenging notions of gender, as each of the two protagonists has a problematic relationship with the way they enact their gender, and the ways they pretend to be a different gender. In one of the play's central lines, Elizabeth says to the actor, "if you will teach me how to be a woman, I will teach you how to be a man."

== Characters ==
The Lord Chamberlain's Men (The names in parentheses are the characters played in Much Ado About Nothing.)

- Will: William Shakespeare, actor-playwright and shareholder of the Lord Chamberlain's men
- Ned: Edward Lowenscroft, actor (Beatrice)
- Jack: Jonathan Edmund, actor (Benedick)
- Matt: Matthew Welles, actor (Claudio)
- Percy: Percy Gower, character actor (Watch)
- Harry: Henry Pearle, actor (Hero)
- Tom: Tom Travis, boy actor (Margaret)
- Ben: Benjamin Herlie, boy actor (Boy)
- Tardy: Kate Tardwell, the wardrobe mistress
- Luddy: Luddy Beddoes, character actor (Friar Francis)
- Bear: Ned's tame bear

The Court

- Stanley: Lady Mary Stanley, maid of honour to the Queen
- Elizabeth: Queen Elizabeth I
- Henslowe: Anne, Countess of Henslowe, lady-in-waiting to the Queen
- Cecil: Lord Robert Cecil, Private Secretary to the Queen
- Servants, Watch, Boys, Men, etc.

== Productions ==
The play premiered at the Stratford Festival of Canada in 2000, directed by Martha Henry and starring Diane D'Aquila as Elizabeth, Brent Carver as Ned, Peter Hutt as Will, and Scott Wentworth as Jack.

The US premiere was at Stages Repertory Theatre in Houston, where it played from September 5–30, 2001. The production was directed by Rob Bundy,

In 2002, the play was produced at Performance Network, Ann Arbor, Michigan.

In 2004, the play received its northern-California premiere in a Pacific Repertory Theatre production at the Golden Bough Playhouse in Carmel, California.

In 2005, The New Place of St. Paul, Minnesota, produced the play's American Midwest Area Premiere.

In May 2006, the play made its Los Angeles premiere at The NoHo Arts Center starring Karesa McElheny as Elizabeth, David H. Ferguson as Ned, and Jay Willick as William Shakespeare. In 2006, the play was produced in Japan.

In 2007, it received its Australian premiere from the Canberra Repertory Society.

In 2008, it received its French-language premiere (Elizabeth, roi d'Angleterre) at the Théâtre du Nouveau Monde in Montreal, translated by René-Daniel Dubois. as well as its New York City premiere at the Nicu's Spoon Theater Company, where it later moved to an Off-Broadway premiere and garnered two NY Innovative Theater Award nominations.

In March 2009, the play made its Washington, D.C., premiere at the Keegan Theatre. In May 2009, Elizabeth Rex was also staged for the first time in South Korea by Theatre Group Mythos under the direction of professor Oh Kyong-sook in the Woosuk Repertoire Theater.

A production at Chicago Shakespeare Theater, with Diane D'Aquila reprising the role of Queen Elizabeth I and co-starring Steven Sutcliffe, opened on December 7, 2011.

The production staged by Vancouver's Bard on the Beach opened July 14, 2013 with Colleen Wheeler playing Queen Elizabeth I and Haig Sutherland playing Ned Lowenscroft.

For its 2014 season, the Illinois Shakespeare Festival presented the play in rotating rep with Much Ado About Nothing and Antony and Cleopatra, with the actors who appeared in Much Ado taking the corresponding characters in Rex. The production was directed by Paula Suozzi and featured Deborah Staples as Elizabeth (and Cleopatra in A&C), Christopher Prentice as Ned, Thomas Anthony Quinn as Will, and Matt Daniels as Jack.

== 2004 TV version ==
A version was broadcast on Bravo! network in 2004. It starred Diane D'Aquila and Brent Carver in the leads, and also Peter Hutt, Scott Wentworth and Bernard Hopkins.

== See also ==
- Elizabeth R
