= Rod Beattie =

Canadian actor

Rod Beattie (born 1948) is a Canadian actor who has been active in Canadian theatre for over 50 years. He is best known for performing the Wingfield Series of plays by Dan Needles. In these plays Beattie plays all the characters, employing changes in voice or facial expression to denote which character he is playing. He has appeared in productions of these plays across Canada and on TV, and in 1991-1992 he won the Dora Mavor Moore Award for best actor in leading role for his performances in the first three Wingfield plays. The plays are directed by his brother Douglas Beattie. The Beatties and the Needles had cottages near each other in the area where the fictitious Wingfield Farm is located.

== Career ==
Beattie has appeared at the Stratford Festival for 16 seasons over the course of 45 years. He has appeared in productions outside Stratford including: The Loveliest and Sylvia in Victoria, The Crucible and Blessings in Disguise in Manitoba, Oleanna at the National Arts Centre opposite Sandra Oh, and Love Letters opposite his then-wife Martha Henry in an Ontario tour. Beattie has a flair for the comic and usually plays the antihero in the comic subplot in Shakespearean productions at Stratford. He is also cast often as the fop or the fool. In his younger days he played the protagonist in Shakespearean plays including Hamlet at Hart House.

Beattie also appeared in the movie The Wars.

On January 14, 2010, the opening night performance of Wingfield Lost and Found at the Citadel Theatre in Edmonton, Alberta was Beattie's 4,000th performance of a Wingfield play in a little over twenty-five years.

From the Orange Hall in Rosemont, Ontario (August 1984) to Edmonton (January 2010), with opening nights in 1985 (Letter from Wingfield Farm), in 1987 (Wingfield's Progress), in 1990 (Wingfield's Folly), in 1997 (Wingfield Unbound), in 2001 (Wingfield on Ice), in 2005 (Wingfield's Inferno) and in 2009 (Wingfield Lost and Found), Beattie has performed across Canada in most major regional theatres, including Victoria's Belfry, the Vancouver Playhouse, Edmonton's Citadel Theatre, Theatre Calgary, the Globe Theatre (Regina), the Manitoba Theatre Centre in Winnipeg, the Grand Theatre in London, the Stratford Festival, Theatre Aquarius in Hamilton, the Royal Alexandra Theatre and Canadian Stage Company in Toronto, Theatre New Brunswick in Fredericton, and Neptune Theatre in Halifax, as well as hundreds of smaller venues.

Beattie has also taken part in seasons at Cincinnati's Playhouse in the Park and the Asolo Theater in Sarasota, Florida. The first three Wingfield plays were broadcast on CBC Radio's Morningside; a TV version of Letter from Wingfield Farm (produced by Primedia Productions) won the 1991 Gemini (Canadian TV) Award for Best Performing Arts Program; and in November 1998, a series of thirty half-hour TV episodes, entitled Wingfield, produced by Norflicks Productions, made its CBC debut. The series currently airs on Bravo! Canada.

== Personal life ==
Beattie was raised in Toronto, attending University of Toronto Schools and later the University of Toronto. He was married to Martha Henry in 1990; although they later separated, they remained married until Henry's death in 2021. He has since married arts administrator Patricia McKinna.

== Recognition ==
Beattie has won three best actor awards for his stage performances in the Wingfield plays: a Sterling in 1988 (Edmonton, Alberta), a Dora in 1992 (Toronto), and a Critics' Award in 1995 (Sarasota). He is a member of the Order of Canada.

== See also ==
- Dan Needles homepage
- Walt Wingfield homepage
