= The Wars (film) =

1983 Canadian film

- Directed by: Robin Phillips
- Written by: Timothy Findley
- Based on: The Wars by Timothy Findley
- Produced by: Richard Nielsen
- Starring: Brent Carver; William Hutt; Martha Henry
- Cinematography: John Coquillon
- Edited by: Tony Lower
- Music by: Glenn Gould
- Production companies: Nielsen-Ferns International; National Film Board of Canada
- Distributed by: International Spectrafilm
- Release date: March 20, 1983
- Running time: 120 minutes
- Country: Canada
- Language: English

The Wars is a Canadian historical drama, directed by Robin Phillips and released in 1983. An adaptation of the Governor General's Award-winning novel The Wars by Timothy Findley, the film centres on Robert Ross (Brent Carver), the privileged and immature son of an upper class Rosedale family who enlists to serve in the Canadian Army during World War I. The film's original musical score was composed by Glenn Gould prior to his death.

As with the novel, the film blends a number of scenes set at war with depictions of the formative experiences from childhood that have led Robert to enlist, including his relationships with his disabled sister Rowena (Ann-Marie MacDonald) and their parents (William Hutt and Martha Henry). The cast was drawn predominantly from the ensemble of actors Phillips had worked with at the Stratford Festival.

== Cast ==
- Brent Carver as Robert Ross
- Martha Henry as Mrs. Ross
- William Hutt as Mr. Ross
- Ann-Marie MacDonald as Rowena Ross
- Jackie Burroughs as Miss Davenport
- Jean LeClerc Captain Taffler
- Domini Blythe as Lady Barbara d'Orsey
- Alan Scarfe as Captain Leather
- Margaret Tyzack as Lady Emmeline
- Barbara Budd as Nurse Turner
- Susan Wright as Ella
- Richard Austin as Michael
- Rodger Barton as Charles
- Paul Batten as Poole
- Rod Beattie as Levitt
- Tom Bishop as Rider
- Kirsten Bishopric as Peggy Ross
- Richard Blackburn as Sergeant
- Fred Booker as Verger
- Dwayne Brenna as Tom Bryant
- Michael Caruana as Soldier
- Shirley Cassedy as Honor
- Clare Coulter as Eena
- Richard Curnock as Minister
- Shirley Douglas as Mrs. Lawson
- David Dunbar as Mr. Brown
- Rupert Frazer as Clive
- Craig Gardner as German Soldier
- Graeme Gibson as Devlin
- Maurice Good as Sergeant Joyce
- Bob Hannah as Major Mickle
- Paul Hubbard as Captain Ord
- Jeff Hyslop as Clifford Purchas
- Eleanor Kane as Woman
- James Kidnie as Martial
- Leo Leyden as Bishop
- Hardee T. Lineham as Bonnycastle
- Robin McKenzie as Stuart Ross
- David Main as Mr. Lawson
- William Merton Malmo as Collins Louis Negan
- Jefferson Mappin as Teddy Budge
- Marti Maraden as Lady of Easy Virtue
- Anne McKay as Child
- Richard McMillan as Harris
- David Robb as Major Terry
- Stephen Russell as Cigarette
- Abigail Seaton as Juliet
- Heather Summerhayes as Heather
- Irene Sutcliffe as Nurse
- Simon Treves as Patient
- Annette Vyge as Madam
- Timothy Webber as Corporal Bates

== Production ==
The film was co-produced by Nielsen-Ferns International and the National Film Board of Canada, the first time the NFB had ever collaborated on a narrative feature film with a commercial production company. Shooting began in May 1981 near Longview, Alberta, but within days Phillips had to revise the production schedule due to unforeseen late snowfall in the area.

Other scenes for the film were shot in Calgary, Kleinburg, Hamilton and Montreal. However, due to technical problems with the sound, much of the film had to be rerecorded in the post-production phase, resulting in one of the key delays from the film's originally planned release date of early 1982. These sound issues were eventually resolved.

== Distribution ==
Organizers of the Festival of Festivals attempted to secure the film as the opening gala of the 1982 Festival of Festivals; however, due to a conflict between Nielsen-Ferns, the NFB and key funder Torstar, it was unable to secure the premiere and instead opened with the Australian film We of the Never Never.

Additional production conflict was also reported between Nielsen-Ferns and the NFB, resulting in additional delays in securing distribution. While theatrical distribution in North America and the United Kingdom was still in flux, a subtitled version of the film was broadcast on German television in March 1983.

The film was acquired by Spectrafilm in May 1983 for theatrical distribution, and had its theatrical premiere in November. Its premiere was organized as a fundraising benefit for the Parkinson Foundation of Canada, following Findley's father's death of Parkinson's disease.

The film was subsequently screened at the 1984 Festival of Festivals as part of Eyes Write, a special program of film adaptations of literary works that was programmed in conjunction with the Harbourfront Centre.

Following its brief initial theatrical run, the film was not seen for over 35 years, until it was unearthed and licensed by the Canada Media Fund for distribution on the Encore+ YouTube channel in 2020. In 2022, Encore+ in association with Telefilm Canada commissioned the remastering of The Wars, undertaken in partnership with the National Film Board of Canada and the Stratford Festival. As of 2024, The Wars Remastered - as well as The Making of The Wars, featuring Martha Henry and leading talents looking back on the making of the film (2020) - can be streamed from the Stratford Festival's StratFest@Home digital streaming platform.

== Awards ==
The film received three Genie Awards from the Academy of Canadian Cinema & Television in 1984, for Best Actress (Henry), Best Supporting Actress (Burroughs) and Best Sound Editing (Sharon Lackie, Bruce Nyznik, and Bernard Bordeleau). It was also nominated for Best Picture, Best Editing (Tony Lower), Best Overall Sound (Hans Peter Strobl), and Best Screenplay (Findley).
