= From Stone Orchard =

- First edition
- Author: Timothy Findley
- Language: English
- Genre: Memoir
- Publisher: HarperFlamingo
- Publication date: 1998

From Stone Orchard is a memoir by Timothy Findley, published in 1998.

The book, which includes some articles Findley had originally written for Harrowsmith magazine, is a memoir of Findley's life at Stone Orchard, the farm near Cannington, Ontario where he lived with his partner William Whitehead.
