= Christopher Sclater Millard =

English author

- Born: 7 November 1872; Basingstoke, Hampshire, England
- Died: 21 November 1927 (aged 55); Hospital of St John and St Elizabeth, London, England
- Resting place: St Mary's Catholic Cemetery, Kensal Green, London
- Education: Bradfield College
- Alma mater: St Mary's Basingstoke; Keble College, Oxford
- Occupation: Author
- Writing career
- Language: English
- Subject: Oscar Wilde

Christopher Sclater Millard (7 November 1872 – 21 November 1927) was the author of the first bibliography of the works of Oscar Wilde as well as several books on Wilde. Millard's bibliography was instrumental in enabling Wilde's literary executor, Robert Baldwin Ross, to establish copyright on behalf of his estate.

== Early life and first imprisonment ==
Millard was born in Basingstoke, Hampshire, England, on 7 November 1872. He was the second son of James Elwin Millard, an Anglican clergyman and Fellow of Magdalen College, Oxford, and Dora Frances Sclater.

He was educated at Bradfield College and St Mary's Basingstoke before matriculating at Keble College, Oxford. At Keble Millard read theology in accordance with his father's ambition that he follow him into the Church. He became a committed Jacobite during his time at university. He moved on to Salisbury Theological College but then converted to Roman Catholicism.

After graduating, Millard taught at Ladycross Preparatory School in Bournemouth and then at his own school—a Catholic establishment in Woodford Wells, Essex, which he left during 1904 for reasons that remain obscure. However, he continued working as a tutor first in Wadhurst in Sussex and then at Iffley, near Oxford. At the same time, he began writing articles on Jacobitism and developing his interest in socialism and the Labour Party. He joined the Legitimist Jacobite League of Great Britain and Ireland the leading group in the Neo-Jacobite Revival of the 1890s.

In April 1906, Millard was arrested at Iffley and charged with two counts of gross indecency under the 1885 Labouchere Amendment to the Criminal Law Act which criminalised all sexual acts between men. He pleaded guilty to avoid a third more serious charge of sodomy, which carried a maximum penalty of ten years' penal servitude, and was sentenced to three months' imprisonment with hard labour.

After his release Millard went to live with his brother, the Rev. Elwin Millard, at St Edmund's vicarage in Forest Gate, East London and Robert Ross helped him obtain a position at The Burlington Magazine, edited by More Adey and Roger Fry. Shortly afterwards he met Charles Scott Moncrieff, later the translator of Proust, then a pupil at Winchester College, who became a lifelong friend. Millard was unhappy in England and spent several months during 1907 in France, though he then returned to London where he spent the rest of his life.

== Scholarship on Oscar Wilde ==
Around 1900, Millard began his compilation and collection of Wildeana in earnest, collaborating with Robert Ross and another scholar of Wilde's works, Walter Edwin Ledger, and he continued to acquire material on and off from much of his life. In 1904 he travelled to Bagneux, south of Paris, with Wilde's friend and biographer Robert Sherard to visit Wilde's grave there. It was, he wrote, "a pilgrimage of love when we watered with our tears the roses and lilies with which we covered the poet's grave". (Wilde's remains were later removed to Père Lachaise Cemetery in Paris.)

In 1905, Millard published his first book, a translation of Prétextes, André Gide's study of Wilde, under the pseudonym Stuart Mason. In November 1907, he published the first volume of his bibliography, a comprehensive catalogue of Wilde's poetic works, with a dedication to Charles Scott Moncrieff.

In 1908, Millard released Oscar Wilde: Art and Morality, a defence of The Picture of Dorian Gray. This was followed in the same year by a privately printed bibliography of Oscar Wilde and, in 1910, by The Oscar Wilde Calendar with a "quotation from the works of Oscar Wilde for every day in the year with some unrecorded sayings selected by Stuart Mason". In early 1912, he published Oscar Wilde: Three Times Tried, the first complete account of the trials which later became the basis for the 1960 film The Trials of Oscar Wilde starring Peter Finch as Wilde.

In July 1914, Millard's Bibliography of Oscar Wilde appeared to wide acclaim. "It is my life's work", he wrote to Walter Ledger, "and the only thing I am likely to be remembered for to my merit." Ross called it "an astonishing and ingenious compilation", claiming that in ten minutes of turning the proofs he had learned "more about Wilde's writings than Wilde himself ever knew".

In 1920, Millard published his last work on Wilde—Oscar Wilde and the Aesthetic Movement—which dealt with the caricatures of Wilde in the music of the 1880s.

Throughout his career, Millard sought to defend Wilde and to expose works incorrectly or fraudulently attributed to Wilde. In 1926 he was sued for libel by Messrs. Hutchinson and Methuen publishers for a letter he had circulated among the bookselling trade claiming that Methuen had knowingly "succeeding in foisting on an unsuspecting public" a play called For Love of the King allegedly by Wilde, but according to Millard, in fact a forgery authored by Mrs. Wodehouse Pearse, also known as Princess Chantoon. Although the play was agreed to be a fake, the jury found in favour of Methuen.

== Private secretary to Robert Ross ==
In 1911, he became private secretary to Robert Ross. In 1914 he gave testimony on Ross's behalf in a libel suit against Lord Alfred Douglas and Thomas William Hodgson Crosland, who were charged with conspiring to falsely accuse Ross with acts of gross indecency with a young man called Charles Garratt.

Millard had met Garratt in 1913 and been intrigued by his "Votes for Women" badge. Garratt later visited him at his flat and they began a sexual relationship. When Garratt was arrested for importuning, Millard appeared in court to speak on his behalf, and a report of the trial in Reynolds Newspaper linking their names attracted the attention of Douglas. When Garratt was imprisoned, solicitors acting for Douglas and Crosland visited him and attempted to convince him to admit to sexual relations with Ross. He initially refused, but later signed a statement to that effect, later claiming that he had been tricked.

On learning of his relationship with Garratt, Ross dismissed Millard from his post as secretary. However, although his libel case was ultimately unsuccessful, Ross was impressed by Millard's loyalty in testifying despite the risk to himself and later reinstated him.

== Second imprisonment ==
In 1916, to avoid a second charge of gross indecency, Millard fled from London and spent several months on a farm in Northumberland before enlisting as a private in the Royal Fusiliers. He was sent to France though he was invalided back to England and discharged from the army in July 1917, whereupon he worked in the War Office as a decipherer of telegram.

In January 1918, he was arrested and charged with gross indecency. He was found guilty and sentenced to a twelve-month sentence in Wormwood Scrubs though the judge spared him hard labour on account of his ill health. Millard's second conviction emboldened Douglas to publicly denounce Ross in court during Maud Allan's libel trial against the right-wing conspiracy theorist Noel Pemberton Billing. Ross died that October while Millard was still in prison.

== Later life and death ==
After his release, Millard began a new occupation as a dealer of antiquarian books and rare manuscripts, doing business from his wooden bungalow at 8 Abercorn Place in St John's Wood. It was there that Millard first mentioned the novel Hadrian the Seventh to A. J. A. Symons, thus sparking Symons' "experiment in biography", The Quest for Corvo, a celebrated study of Frederick Rolfe.

In 1922, through a friendship with the young Anthony Powell, himself a keen collector, Millard began compiling materials for a bibliography of the artist and publisher Claud Lovat Fraser, which appeared the following year.

Millard died of an aneurysm at the Hospital of St John and St Elizabeth, London on 21 November 1927, and was buried at St Mary's Catholic Cemetery, Kensal Green.
