= Mount Royal (TV series) =

- Created by: Robert Lantos
- Starring: Patrick Bauchau; Domini Blythe; Jonathan Crombie; Guylaine St-Onge; Catherine Colvey
- Country of origin: Canada
- No. of episodes: 16

Production
- Running time: 60 minutes

Original release
- Network: CTV
- Release: January 3 – May 24, 1988

Mount Royal is a Canadian prime time television soap opera that aired on CTV. It premiered January 3, 1988 with a two-hour episode. The series starred Patrick Bauchau and Domini Blythe. It is said to be Canada's answer to the American soap opera Dynasty.

== Setting ==
The series was set in an upscale Montreal neighbourhood. It followed the Valeur family. Andre Valeur his wife Katherine and their three children Danielle, Stefanie and Rob. The Valeur family not only had a home in Montreal but also in Paris and they spent much time there during the show's short run.

== Production ==
The series was produced by CTV, Alliance Communications and the French production company Société Française de Production. It was filmed in both Montreal and Paris and at the time was one of the most expensive Canadian television productions, with a budget of $17 million.

== Awards ==
The show won a Gemini Award for best guest star thanks to Martha Henry's performance. It was also nominated for four other Gemini Awards, including best music composition and best lead actor in a continuing dramatic role.

== Music ==
The show's theme song, titled "The Power and the Glory", was sung by Sherry Kean and Alfie Zappacosta. It was released as a single in 1988 on Attic Records, but failed to chart.
