= The Telling of Lies =

1986 novel by Timothy Findley

- First edition
- Author: Timothy Findley
- Language: English
- Publisher: Viking Press
- Publication date: 1986
- Publication place: Canada
- ISBN: 0140241159
- Preceded by: Not Wanted on the Voyage
- Followed by: Stones

The Telling of Lies is a 1986 novel by Timothy Findley. A murder mystery, the novel centres on Vanessa Van Horne, a landscape architect who witnesses the apparent murder of pharmaceutical mogul Calder Maddox at the seaside Aurora Sands Hotel in Maine.

Following the book's paperback publication in the United States in 1988, the novel won the Edgar Award for Best Paperback Original in 1989.
