= Journeyman: Travels of a Writer =

2003 book

- First edition
- Author: Timothy Findley
- Language: English
- Publication date: 2003
- Publication place: Canada
- ISBN: 9780006394747
- Preceded by: Spadework

Journeyman: Travels of a Writer is a 2003 book by Timothy Findley. The book, compiled by Findley's partner William Whitehead, is a posthumous collection of journal entries, letters, poems, speeches and newspaper and magazine articles written by Findley. Some, but not all, editions of the book have been published under the alternate title Journeyman: Travels with a Writer.

The book is organized in sections, with writings addressing his travels, sojourns in the past and future, and Findley's craft as a writer and actor.
