= Dinner Along the Amazon =

1984 book by Timothy Findley

- First edition cover
- Author: Timothy Findley
- Publisher: Penguin Canada
- Publication date: February 7, 1984
- ISBN: 978-0-140-07304-1

Dinner Along the Amazon is a 1984 short story collection by Canadian writer Timothy Findley, first published by Penguin Canada.

The title story was adapted into a short film in 1996, which starred Arsinée Khanjian and Dan Lett, directed by Patrick Sisam.

== Stories ==
- "Lemonade"
- "War"
- "About Effie"
- "Sometime - Later - Not Now"
- "What Mrs. Felton Knew"
- "The People on the Shore"
- "Hello Cheeverland, Goodbye"
- "Losers, Finders, Strangers at the Door"
- "The Book of Pins"
- "Daybreak at Pisa"
- "Out of the Silence"
- "Dinner Along the Amazon"
