= Headhunter (novel) =

1993 novel by Timothy Findley

- First edition cover
- Author: Timothy Findley
- Publisher: HarperCollins
- Publication date: April 1, 1994
- ISBN: 978-0-002-23745-1
- OCLC: 27067153

Headhunter is a novel by Canadian writer Timothy Findley. It was first published by HarperCollins in 1993.

== Plot summary ==
The novel is set in a dystopic Toronto, Ontario buffeted by a mysterious plague called sturnusemia, which is believed to be carried by starlings. Against this backdrop Lilah Kemp, a schizophrenic spiritualist "of intense but undisciplined powers", accidentally sets Kurtz free from page 92 of Joseph Conrad's Heart of Darkness and is forced to find a Marlow to defeat him.

Kurtz becomes head of the Parkin Psychiatric Institute (based on the real Clarke Institute of Psychiatry) and travels among the city's elites, including a "Club of Men" which is in fact a child pornography ring. Marlow, meanwhile, is a staff psychiatrist at the Parkin.

Although the reader is clearly meant to see the parallels between Findley's Kurtz and Marlow and Conrad's original characters, the book is deliberately ambiguous about whether Lilah Kemp has really performed this act of literary magic, or is merely crazy enough to think she has.

== Reception ==
Headhunter received starred reviews from Booklist and Publishers Weekly.

Booklist's Emily Melton referred to the novel as "a powerful, brilliantly conceived, spellbinding story that will mesmerize readers from first page to last", while Publishers Weekly called it "overlong and overwrought, yet compelling and powerful". Melton further stated that the novel is "at once dazzling, mind-blowing, and unrelentingly grim", as well as "a wonderfully dark satire, a horrifying tale of decadence and evil, and a savagely witty commentary on human society." Ellen Datlow similarly praised Headhunter as "suspenseful, dark, twisted, and complex." Publishers Weekly also highlighted how Findley [...] creates witty literary allusions", pointing specifically to a character who "is a contemporary Emma Bovary" and "another [...] named Jay Gatz".

Despite an overall positive review, Publishers Weekly noted some mixed thoughts: "Some passages are brilliant, glittering with insights, while others bear the marks of haste and melodramatic excess. There are a stupefying number of characters and subplots." Kirkus Reviews similarly mentioned the novel's "obstacle course of intolerably digressive subplots" and referred to it as a "recklessly overscaled novel".

Headhunter won the Toronto Book Award in 1994.
