= Domini Blythe =

Canadian actress (1947–2010)

- Born: Domini Miranda Blythe; August 28, 1947; Upton, Cheshire
- Died: December 15, 2010 (aged 63); Montreal, Quebec
- Education: Royal Central School of Speech and Drama
- Occupation: actress
- Years active: 1969–2010
- Partner: Jean Beaudin

Domini Blythe (August 28, 1947 – December 15, 2010) was a British-born Canadian actress. Her numerous stage, film and television credits included Search for Tomorrow, External Affairs, The Wars, Savage Messiah, Montreal Stories and Mount Royal.

== Early life and education ==
Blythe was born in Upton-by-Chester. She graduated from the Central School of Speech and Drama in London.

== Career ==
She worked for the Royal Shakespeare Company and made her stage debut in London's West End in 1970 in Oh, Calcutta! She appeared as Anna Müller in the Hammer film Vampire Circus in 1972 before moving to Canada the same year, eventually settling in Stratford, Ontario. She went on to perform in many leading roles at the Stratford Festival including a solo show about the abolishionist Fanny Kemble co-created with director Peter Hinton-Davis. She also spent several years at the Shaw Festival in Niagara-on-the-Lake.

== Personal life ==
Some sources identified film writer-director Jean Beaudin as her husband. The Independent reported that he was "her partner of more than 20 years". Blythe died of cancer in Montreal on December 15, 2010, at the age of 63.

== Filmography ==
=== Film ===
Year	Title	Role	Notes
1972	Vampire Circus	Anna	
1973	A Story of Tutankhamun	Christine	
1975	The Heatwave Lasted Four Days	Gabriella	
1983	The Wars	Lady Barbara d'Orsey	
1991	Montreal Stories	Vielle dame	
1994	Mrs. Parker and the Vicious Circle	Actress in Mirror	
1995	Voices	Lady Virginia Milford	
1997	Afterglow	Helene Pelletier	
1998	When I Will Be Gone (L'Âge de braise)	Rachel	
1999	External Affairs	Sylvia Riordan	
2002	Savage Messiah (Moïse, l’affaire Roch Thériault)	Gayle	
2007	Emotional Arithmetic	Jane Radley	
2008	Affinity	Mother Prior	
2009	The Trotsky	Mrs. Davis	

=== Television ===
Year	Title	Role	Notes
1969	Boy Meets Girl	Candida	Episode: "A Name in the Lights"
1972	Thirty-Minute Theatre	Venice	Episode: "Hands"
1985, 1986	Search for Tomorrow	Estelle Kendall	2 episodes
1987, 1989	Street Legal	Elsbeth McTague / Lily Marcheson	2 episodes
1988	Mount Royal	Katherine Valeur	16 episodes
1988	Formula I	Jennifer Moore	8 episodes
1991	Urban Angel	Margaret Cogswell	Episode: "Fire & Ice"
1993	Road to Avonlea	Mrs. Campbell	Episode: "Heirs and Graces"
1994	Scoop III	Allison Carlisle	3 episodes
1994	Million Dollar Babies	Nurse Lena de Keyzer	2 episodes
1995	Vanished	Marielle's Mother	Television film
1995	Les grands procès	Mary Lindsay	Episode: "L'affaire Coffin"
1998	More Tales of the City	Helena Parrish	3 episodes
2000	Deadly Appearances	Eve Boychuk	Television film
2010	Ties That Bind	Judge Evelyn Rowe	Television film
