= Mabel Cosgrove Wodehouse Pearse =

Irish writer

Mabel Cosgrove Wodehouse-Pearse
- Born: Mary Mabel Cosgrove; 12 May 1873; Cork, Ireland
- Other names: Princess Chan-Toon
- Occupation: Writer
- Known for: novels about Burma

Mary Mabel Cosgrove Wodehouse-Pearse (12 May 1873 – ), also known as Princess Chan-toon, was an Irish writer who married Prince Chan-Toon, the nephew of the King of Burma. She is known for her novels about Burma, particularly A Marriage in Burmah, and for a controversy surrounding the authorship of For Love of the King, a play that she claimed had been written by the Irish playwright Oscar Wilde.

== Biography ==
Mary Mabel Cosgrove was born in Ireland in 1873. She was the granddaughter of Henry Bacon Julian, a prominent solicitor in Cork. In 1893, she married Prince Chan-Toon, a Burmese barrister and nephew of a hereditary king of Arakan. In a checkered life, she wrote several books, was married a second time to Armine Wodehouse-Pearse, and spent time in an English prison for theft and in a Mexican prison for blackmail.

== Oscar Wilde controversy ==
In October 1921, Hutchinson's Magazine published an undiscovered play, For Love of the King, allegedly by Oscar Wilde. The play was subsequently published in book form by Methuen Publishing in 1922. The manuscript was offered to Methuen by Wodehouse Pearse along with a letter from Wilde (written in November 1894) stating that he was sending her the fairy play "for the love of the king" for her "own amusement". In 1925, Christopher Millard, a well-known biographer of Wilde, was approached by Wodehouse Pearse who tried to sell him some letters that she said were written by Wilde. Convinced that the letters as well as the play were forgeries, Millard published a pamphlet stating that Methuen had knowingly published a play that it knew to be a forgery. Methuen sued Millard for defamation and won an award of £200. During the trial, Wodehouse Pearse could not be found to testify (she was later discovered in prison serving a sentence for theft).

== Publications ==
Novels

- What Was the Verdict? (as Mabel Cosgrove). Simpkin, Marshall, Hamilton, Kent & Co., 1892.
- Under Eastern Skies. Rangoon, Hanthawaddy Press, 1901.
- A Marriage in Burmah. London, Greening & Co., 1905.
- Leper and Millionaire. London, Greening & Co., 1910.
- Helen Wyverne's Marriage. London, Digby, Long & Co., 1912
- Love Letters of an English Peeress to an Indian Prince. London, Digby, Long & Co., 1912.
- A Shadow of Burmah. London, Digby, Long & Co., 1914.

Collections

- Told on the Pagoda: Tales of Burmah. (by Mimosa). London, T. Fisher Unwin, 1895.
- The Triumph of Love, and other stories. London, Greening & Co., 1906.
