= The Butterfly Plague =

1969 book by Timothy Findley

The Butterfly Plague is a novel by Canadian author Timothy Findley, published in 1969. Set in the period just before World War II, the novel centres on Ruth Damarosch, an Olympic swimming champion who returns to her home in Los Angeles after several years living in Germany with her now ex-husband and swimming coach Bruno, amid the context of a swarm of monarch butterflies afflicting the city.

Supporting characters include Ruth's brother Adolphus, a gay and hemophiliac film director; their father George, a failed Hollywood film mogul; Naomi, their faded movie star mother; actresses Myra Jacobs and Letitia Virden; and Octavius, a drag queen.

The novel was published by Viking Press in 1969. Out of print for many years, it was reissued in paperback by Penguin Canada in 1986.
