= John Ross (Canadian politician) =

Canadian lawyer, politician, and businessman

The Honourable John Ross QC
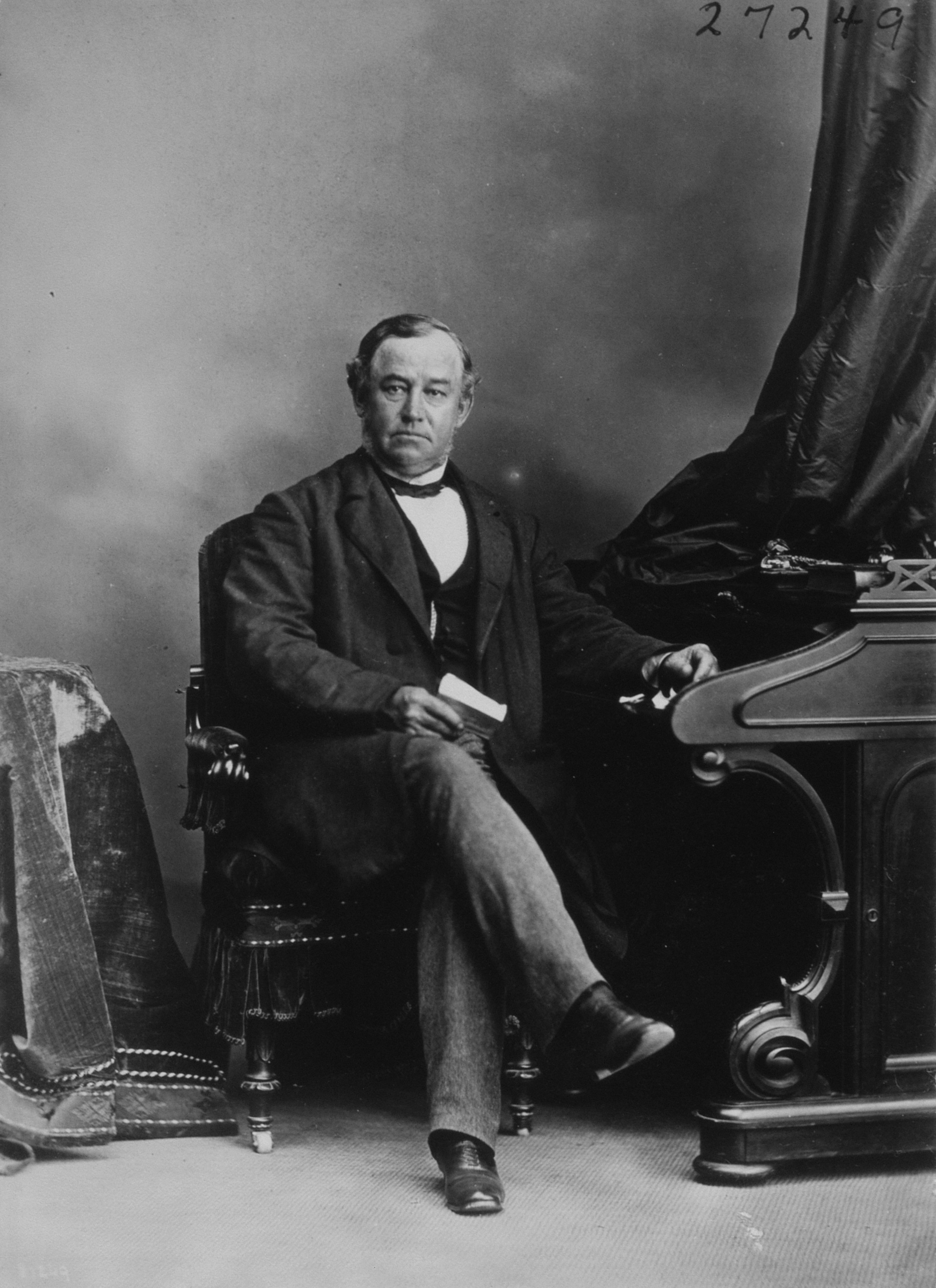

2nd Speaker of the Senate of Canada
- In office 1867–1871
- Appointed by: Royal Proclamation

Canadian Senator from Ontario
- In office May 17, 1869 – May 26, 1869
- Preceded by: Joseph-Édouard Cauchon
- Succeeded by: Joseph-Édouard Cauchon

Personal details
- Born: March 10, 1818 County Antrim, Ireland
- Died: January 31, 1871 (aged 52) Toronto, Ontario, Canada
- Party: Conservative

John Ross (March 10, 1818 – January 31, 1871) was a Canadian lawyer, politician, and businessman.

== Background ==
Born in County Antrim, Ireland, he was brought to Canada as an infant. Ross married twice, first to Margaret Crawford who died in 1847, secondly to Augusta Elizabeth Baldwin February 4, 1851, the daughter of Robert Baldwin. Ross was president of the Grand Trunk Railway from 1853 to 1862 when he was succeeded by Sir Edward William Watkin. In 1867, he was appointed to the Senate representing the senatorial division of Ontario. A Conservative, the Honourable John Ross served until his death in 1871 in Toronto, Ontario.

Ross' son Robert Baldwin Ross, known as Robbie, had a long-term relationship with Oscar Wilde.
