= The Last Spike (book) =

1971 Canadian non-fiction book by Pierre Berton

- Author: Pierre Berton
- Subject: Canadian Pacific Railway
- Publication date: 1971
- ISBN: 0-7710-1327-2

The Last Spike is a 1971 Canadian non-fiction book by Pierre Berton describing the construction and completion of the Canadian Pacific Railway between 1881 and 1885. It is a sequel to Berton's 1970 book The National Dream. Both books formed the basis for the TV miniseries The National Dream.

The book won the 1971 Governor General's Award for English-language non-fiction.

== Editions ==
- 1971 (McClelland and Stewart): ISBN 0-7710-1327-2
- 1974, combined with The National Dream (McClelland and Stewart): ISBN 0-7710-1332-9
- 2001 (Anchor Canada): ISBN 0-385-65841-9
