= Robin Phillips =

English-Canadian film and stage director (1942–2015)

Robin Phillips OC
- Phillips in 1973
- Born: 28 February 1940; Haslemere, Surrey, England
- Died: 25 July 2015 (aged 75); Canada
- Occupations: Stage actor; film and stage director
- Years active: 1962–1972 (as an actor)
- Partner: Joe Mandel (1971–2015)

Robin Phillips OC (28 February 1940 – 25 July 2015) was an English actor and film director.

== Life ==
He was born in Haslemere, Surrey in 1940 to Ellen Anne (née Barfoot) and James William Phillips. He trained at the Bristol Old Vic, where a contemporary was Patrick Stewart, and worked as an actor and director for many years in the United Kingdom, finishing as artistic director at the Greenwich Theatre from 1973 to 1975.

He was hired as artistic director at the Stratford Festival in Canada in 1975, where he spent six seasons directing many productions and cultivating new talent. Maggie Smith, Richard Monette, Martha Henry and Brian Bedford, among others, were prominently featured during his tenure, and many of his Shakespearean, classical, and contemporary productions won widespread acclaim. In a review of Phillips' 1977 Stratford production of Richard III with Bedford in the title role, The Globe and Mail theatre critic John Fraser wrote: "The production Phillips has mounted is stunning, crackling with nuances and details that are spellbinding, while radiating an over-all economy of dramatic management that demands an intense involvement from any audience". Veteran Stratford actor and director William Hutt compared Phillips to earlier artistic directors by saying: "With Guthrie, the heartbeat of a production was loud, obvious, robust and healthy. With Langham, rhythmic, predictable and safe. With Gascon it ran fast; you suspected high blood pressure. With Phillips the heartbeat is thunderingly silent: it’s the audience’s hearts you hear beating”.

Phillips' energy seemed boundless during his time at the Stratford helm. He directed 36 productions in six seasons (his predecessor Jean Gascon directed 17 productions in seven seasons), and the company, audience, and overall scale of the organization grew considerably. But the workload took its toll: exhaustion was cited as the primary reason for his departure when he resigned during the 1980 season. He would later become artistic director at the Grand Theatre in London, Ontario and return to Stratford to direct the Young Company in 1987–88. He was also director general at the Citadel Theatre in Edmonton from 1990 to 1995.

He directed a musical version of Jekyll & Hyde (1997) on Broadway (winning the Drama Desk Award for Outstanding Set Design for his contribution to the scenic design); Long Day's Journey into Night in London's West End in 2000; and a stage version of Larry's Party at Canadian Stage and the National Arts Centre in 2001.

Phillips was appointed an Officer of the Order of Canada (OC) in 2005. The citation read, in part, "Robin Phillips is revered amongst members of Canada's acting community. ... A tremendous asset to the cultural life of Canada, he is also credited with bringing new life to the Citadel Theatre in Edmonton and to theatres across the country." In 2010, Phillips received the Governor General's Performing Arts Award for Lifetime Artistic Achievement, Canada's highest honour in the performing arts. He was awarded the Queen Elizabeth II Diamond Jubilee Medal in 2012.

Phillips died in his sleep on 25 July 2015, after a prolonged illness. He was survived by a younger sister, Hilary, and by his partner, Joe Mandel (1936–2023), whom he first met in 1962 but who became his partner in 1971.

== In film ==
Though none of his stage productions were captured on film, Phillips is featured in the documentary Robin and Mark and Richard III, in which he guides veteran TV actor Mark McKinney through some key scenes in Shakespeare's Richard III. Its creators Susan Coyne and Martha Burns had both been directed and mentored by Phillips earlier in their careers, and wanted to capture some of his technique coaching McKinney, a Shakespeare novice. The film was released in 2016, shortly after Phillips' death.

== Selected film and TV credits ==
- Doctor Who The Keys of Marinus (1964) - Altos
- The Saint (1 episode, 1965) - Nigel Perry
- Broome Stages (6 episodes, 1966) - Robin Broome
- The Avengers (1 episode, 1966) - John Pettit
- The Forsyte Saga (1967) - Wilfred Desert
- Decline and Fall... of a Birdwatcher (1968) - Paul Pennyfeather
- Two Gentlemen Sharing (1969) - Roddy Pater
- David Copperfield (1970; TV) - David Copperfield
- Un estate con sentimento (1970) - Mark Faulkner
- Tales from the Crypt (1972) - James Elliot (segment 3 "Poetic Justice") (final film role)

== Director ==
- The House of Bernarda Alba [stage] (1973)
- Miss Julie [television] (1974)
- The Wars [film] (1983)
