= Stones (short story collection) =

1988 short story collection by Timothy Findley

- First edition cover Cover art by Blair Drawson
- Author: Timothy Findley
- Publisher: Viking Canada
- Publication date: 1988
- ISBN: 978-0-670-82297-3

Stones is the second book of short stories by Canadian author Timothy Findley, first published by Viking Canada in 1988.

== Contents ==
- The first two stories, "Bragg and Minna" and "A Gift of Mercy" both detail the marriage of a homosexual (or perhaps bisexual) man named Bragg and his wife Minna. In "Bragg and Minna", the two have a child (though Bragg is opposed to the idea), and it is born with six digits on each extremity and mental disabilities. Minna, after having left Bragg and moving to Australia in search of a family to take care of their child, dies at a very young age, and Bragg travels across the Pacific Ocean to pick up her ashes and then spreads across the lands of the Ku-ring-gai (an indigenous people native to Australia).
- "A Gift of Mercy" details how the couple met. Minna, working in a diner on Queen Street, saw Bragg walk into the diner in which she worked and is refused use of the telephone by the propitiator of the diner. Minna follows Bragg out of the diner and introduces herself. The two move from Queen Street, a decision made by Bragg who wanted to remove Minna from the influences of the area, but Minna still frequents the area and one evening brings a homeless woman home. Bragg is furious and eventually throws the woman out. Though the couple had been sleeping in separate beds at this point in their marriage, after Bragg returns the homeless lady to her dwelling on Queen Street, he brings home a man he picked up at a bar.
- In the story "Foxes", a Professor Glandenning, who is a reclusive communications expert who visits the Royal Ontario Museum to examine some masks acquired from Japan which were used in an ancient play and depicted the transformation of fox into a human. The professor actually tries the masks on and on his way out, one of the employees offers him polite goodbye, which Glandenning practically ignores. On his way out, the employee asks one of her fellow employees if she smells something, to which she replies “dog”, hinting that there is some sort of actual transformation taking place in Glandenning.
- "The Sky" details the life of a Kafkaesque protagonist (Morrison) who throughout the day witnesses random items fall from the sky (which he calls sky bolts), whilst considering issues in his life (one such issue is the affair he believes his wife and his brother are having, which he believes is best left unchecked). Morrison, who frequently attends symphony performances and falls in love from a distance with a redheaded performer in his youth. The story goes back into Morrison’s personal narrative and details how he met his wife, who being redheaded herself reminded Morrison of the woman he loved from afar. Upon the narrative's return to the present tense, Morrison causes a scene at the symphony, then returns home and unhappy with his life, he sits on the steps of his house drinking and crying.
- "Dreams" details the lives of pair of psychiatrists who are married to each other. The husband handles schizophrenics, and the wife treats autistic children. Both are working with very troubled cases throughout the narrative. The wife witnesses the death of a child who she had come to care about, and the husband has been losing sleep because he has been having nightmares about his patient killing people. At his hospital, his patient has been waking up covered in blood, but there is no source for the blood, and the husband begins losing sleep, worried that his dreams are giving his patient a medium in which to cause harm to others. After the patient dies, the doctor wakes up covered in blood, and his wife agrees to wait with her husband in the bathroom ‘until they both wake up’.
- In the stories, "The Name’s the Same" and "Real Life Writes Real Bad" both tell the story of two brothers, Bud, and the first-person narrator Neil. In the first story Neil takes on a voice that seems very much to be a homage to Holden Caulfield, protagonist of The Catcher in the Rye. In it, it tells of Bud’s reluctance to work and the relationship he has with a woman named Kate. In "Real Life Writes Real Bad", Bud’s partner Kate dies of cancer, and Bud, rather than dealing with the tragedy, chooses to believe that his wife has abandoned him and refuses to believe that she has died. Bud becomes even more reclusive and ends up starving himself to near death. He spends the rest of his days in hospital care and has little or no memory or awareness of what is going on around him. The narrative tone, though still first-person, is very much different from the first story.
- "Alymeyer’s Mother" tells the story of a woman who has kept her personal family history a secret. Her father had left their mother after their two sons both died in a car accidents and took on a new relationship with a girl the same age as herself. She wonders to her son what would have happened to her had her father not found another girl of her age.
- "Stones" tells the story of a man who volunteered for WWII, and while he had been much loved by his family before the war, when he returns home afterward he is no longer the same person, quick to violence and vulgar tones, a stark contrast to the way he had behaved before. It turns out that at the raid of Dieppe in WWII, upon seeing the futility of the battle, the patriarch of the narrative falls back, and is eventually dishonourably discharged from military service. At the end of the narrative, the patriarch who had lived apart from his family after having tried to kill his own wife, dies and the youngest son, who is the first-person narrator of the story, brings the ashes of his father to Dieppe and spreads them across stones which had neutralized the tanks and lead to a slaughter of the Canadian forces in WWII.
