= The National Dream (book) =

History by Pierre Berton (1970)

- Title page for The National Dream (1970)
- Author: Pierre Berton
- Language: English
- Subject: Canadian Pacific Railway
- Genre: Non-fiction
- Publisher: McClelland and Stewart
- Publication date: 1970
- Publication place: Canada
- ISBN: 0-7710-1326-4

The National Dream is a 1970 Canadian non-fiction book by Pierre Berton describing the planning and commencement of the Canadian Pacific Railway between 1871 and 1881.

Following the book's success, a 1971 sequel (The Last Spike) described the construction phase between 1881 and 1885. Both books formed the basis for the TV miniseries The National Dream in 1974.

== Editions ==
- 1970 (McClelland and Stewart): ISBN 0-7710-1326-4
- 1974, combined with The Last Spike (McClelland and Stewart): ISBN 0-7710-1332-9
- 2001 (Anchor Canada): ISBN 0-385-65840-0
