= The National Dream (miniseries) =

1974 Canadian TV docudrama miniseries

- Based on: The National Dream; The Last Spike
- Written by: William Whitehead; Timothy Findley
- Directed by: James Murray; Eric Till
- Starring: John Colicos; Gillie Fenwick; William Hutt; Joseph Shaw; Gerard Parkes; Chris Wiggins
- Narrated by: Pierre Berton
- Theme music composer: Louis Applebaum
- Country of origin: Canada
- Original language: English
- No. of episodes: 8

Production
- Producer: James Murray
- Cinematography: Harry Makin, CSC
- Editors: Don Haig; Arla Saare
- Running time: 447 minutes (approx. 56 minutes per episode)
- Budget: $2,000,000

Original release
- Network: CBC
- Release: 3 March – 28 April 1974

The National Dream, also known as The National Dream: Building the Impossible Railway, is a 1974 Canadian television docudrama miniseries based on Pierre Berton's 1970 book of the same name, plus Berton's 1971 follow-up book The Last Spike. The television adaptation was written by William Whitehead and Timothy Findley. Berton is listed as a consultant on the credits.

== Production ==
The series portrayed the concept and construction of the Canadian Pacific Railway during the late 19th century, with Berton himself as narrator. The National Dream combined dramatic reconstructions of the events (directed by Eric Till) with documentary content (directed by James Murray). Production required two years and cost $2 million. Royal Trust, which was the executor of Cornelius Van Horne's estate, paid $400,000 to be a principal sponsor.

CBC Television premiered the eight-part hour-long series on 30 March 1974 and aired its final instalment on 28 April 1974. The series' rated audience of three million within Canada set a record for CBC in terms of dramatic programming. The series was also dubbed in French and broadcast on Radio-Canada, and was later seen in modified form on BBC in the United Kingdom.

=== Principal cast ===
- John Colicos as Cornelius Van Horne
- Gillie Fenwick as Alexander Mackenzie
- William Hutt as John A. Macdonald
- Joseph Shaw as George Stephen
- Gerard Parkes as Edward Blake
- Chris Wiggins as Donald Smith
- Ted Follows as Charles Tupper

=== List of episodes ===
- The Great Lone Land
- The Pacific Scandal
- The Horrid B.C. Business
- The Great Debate
- The Railway General
- The Sea of Mountains
- The Desperate Days
- The Last Spike

== After initial release ==
The series was never intended for international sales to cover any significant portion of its production costs. Berton, however, was believed to have earned at least $250,000 from it, as well as from a re-release of the related books.

There has never been a home video release, but it is available to educational institutions in DVD on special order from the CBC.
