= Pilgrim (Findley novel) =

1999 novel by Timothy Findley

- First edition
- Author: Timothy Findley
- Language: English
- Publisher: HarperFlamingo
- Publication date: 1999
- Publication place: Canada
- Media type: Print (Hardback & Paperback)
- Pages: 486 pp
- ISBN: 0-06-019197-X
- OCLC: 41977320
- Dewey Decimal: 813/.54 21
- LC Class: PR9199.3.F52 P55 2000

Pilgrim is a novel by Timothy Findley, first published by HarperFlamingo in Canada in 1999. The first US edition was published by HarperCollins in 2000. The novel is typical of Findley's interest in Jungian psychology; in fact, Carl Jung himself is a major character.

The novel's protagonist is Pilgrim, an immortal who is brought to Jung's clinic in Zürich after his latest suicide attempt. Pilgrim has lived through the ages, moving from one life to another, and claims to be tired of living. Jung takes it upon himself to cure what he sees as a delusion and to restore Pilgrim's will to live. Pilgrim was nominated for the 1999 Giller Prize.

Pilgrim is the inspiration for a contemporary opera, The Dream Healer, composed by Lloyd Burritt, with libretto by Christopher Allan and Don Mowatt. The premiere was March 2008 at the Chan Centre for the Performing Arts at the University of British Columbia. It featured star mezzo-soprano Judith Forst as Lady Sybil Quartermaine, John Avey as Carl Jung, and Roelof Oostwould as Pilgrim.
