= More Adey =

English editor (1858–1942)

William More Adey (born William Moore Adey; 22 July 1858 – 29 January 1942) was an English art critic, editor and aesthete. He was a co-editor of The Burlington Magazine, but is perhaps best known for having been a friend and member of the inner circle of Oscar Wilde from the early 1890s until Wilde's death in 1900. As a defender of Wilde during his trial and imprisonment, Adey visited the fallen author in Reading Gaol, attempted to negotiate on behalf of the gaoled writer's interests as his de facto guardian, and oversaw a collection that was used to purchase necessities of life, including clothes, for him upon his release.

Adey was also a partner of Lord Alfred Douglas in 1895, and a close friend of the poet from the 1890s until 1913. Douglas's biographer, Rupert Croft-Cooke, refers to Adey as "a homosexual of what, among his fellows, was and is, called the 'discreet' kind." Adey also developed a professional relationship and 15-year life partnership with Wilde's other good friend, Robbie Ross. When Douglas and Ross faced each other in court in 1913 in the Arthur Ransome libel case, Adey testified in Ross's favour, which caused Douglas to sever his ties with his former friend.

Adey became assistant editor of the Burlington Magazine in November 1910, and served as co-editor, in partnership with Roger Fry and Lionel Cust, from January 1914 until May 1919. Adey can thus be seen as a point of connection between the aesthetes of the London 1890s and the Bloomsbury circle that came to prominence a generation later. He is credited with over thirty bylined articles in the magazine, as well as numerous unsigned notes and reviews, and is credited with bringing a strong iconographic appreciation to the magazine.

Ross's death in October 1918 was a blow to Adey, who wrote in a letter to a mutual friend five days after the bereavement that "no one can ever be to me what he has been". Ross made his former partner the principal beneficiary of his will, but at an unknown point in the 1920s Adey was overcome by mental challenges and had to be confined in a place of long-term care.

Adey died under care in 1942; in a brief tribute to the Burlington Magazine's early co-editor, Barbara Pezzini described him in May 2010 as follows: "More Adey has often been described as a shy and diffident man, and his tragic death in a mental health institution in 1942, after having lost contact with even his closest friends, seemed to taint retrospectively his whole life."

== Early life ==
More Adey was born on 22 July 1858 in Wotton-under-Edge, the youngest of five children and only son born to Emma Elizabeth Adey and Anthony Adey, the latter of which died in 1869. In 1870, Adey began studying at Clifton College.
