= Famous Last Words (novel) =

1981 book by Timothy Findley

- First edition (publ. Clarke Irwin)
- Author: Timothy Findley
- Language: English
- Publication date: 1981

Famous Last Words is a 1981 novel by Canadian author Timothy Findley, in which Hugh Selwyn Mauberley (originally from the Ezra Pound poem of the same name) is the main character.

In the book Findley poses a few ideas involving the flight of Rudolf Hess into Scotland.

== Reception ==
Christopher Lehmann-Haupt of The New York Times wrote that "[i]n his remarkable new novel," Findley "has mixed fact and fiction, actual people and invented ones, to produce a new and bizarre form of historical romance. Similar in mood to D.M. Thomas's The White Hotel and almost as boldly imagined, Famous Last Words reflects on the catastrophe that is 20th-century history and raises further doubts about the possibility of surviving it." In The Boston Phoenix, John Domini felt that the novel was "overwritten in places and overindulgent of its idols; yet in its creation of Mauberley, and its investigation of that sensitive man’s entrapment in evil, Famous Last Words carries forward essential work. It makes eloquent what had previously been numbed, accusatory, and silent."
