= Spadework =

Novel by Timothy Findley

- First edition
- Author: Timothy Findley
- Language: English
- Publisher: HarperCollins Canada (hardcover)
- Publication date: August 30, 2001
- Publication place: Canada
- Media type: Print (Hardcover, Paperback), e-book
- Pages: 408 pp
- ISBN: 0-00-225508-1
- OCLC: 46992155

Spadework is a novel by Canadian writer Timothy Findley set in the theater world of Stratford, Ontario. It was first published in Canada by HarperCollins Publishers in 2001.

== Plot introduction ==
Spadework focuses on the everyday drama of human relationships, enhanced by the intensity of the theater atmosphere and the ambition of young actors at a crossroads that may lead to either a brilliant career or mediocre success. These events force the protagonists to re-examine their sexuality and their loyalties in the face of temptation.

== Plot summary ==
The novel centers on the story of a few summer months in 1998 in Stratford, Ontario against the backdrop of the Clinton-Lewinsky scandal. The novel is narrated in third-person narrator, which allows change of perspective between the chapters, with Jane Kincaid (a property maker for the Stratford Shakespeare Festival) being the dominant character voice throughout. Jane Kincaid is an immigrant from a southern town somewhere in Louisiana, called Plantation. She left the United States for Ontario to begin a new life as an artist, and to escape her family who was providing her with a modest income from an inheritance. Jane shed her birth-name Aura Lee Terry during the move. She met her husband Griffin, an up-and-coming young Shakespearean actor, and the two lead what seems an entirely ordinary happy suburban existence together with their seven-year-old son Will, dog Rudyard and housekeeper/nanny Mercy Bowman.

Their peaceful existence begins to unravel when Griffin's handsome looks lead Jane to suspect that other women (specifically stage partner Zoë Walker, 21) may be after him. This is the spark for the unease and miscommunication which follows. Tony Preston, a high-school boyfriend of Jane's, then shows up out of the blue and sexually assaults her, ejaculating on her dress and face. A few hours later, Preston dies in a car accident. Jane refuses to mention this to anyone, even her psychiatrist, although the reader gets a glimpse of the assault haunting her through the narrative. The town is also menaced by a rape-murderer, who kills two women before committing suicide by drug overdose. Furthermore, Jane receives a strangely aloof letter from her mother telling her that her sister Loretta has committed suicide.

A telephone line cut by the spade of an over-eager gardener (Luke) serves as the physical manifestation or symbol for the theme of miscommunication and failure to connect. This cut telephone line prevents two phone calls: one from Griffin to his director Jonathan Crawford, and one from Jesse Quinlan to his nephew Luke, the gardener. Due to this breakdown of communication, Jesse descents to a rapist and murderer. The other missed call from Griffin, meant that he missed out on a potential break-through role due to not committing to a sexual affair with Jonathan. This devastates Griffin, and in desperation, he agrees to meet with Jonathan, where they agree to engage in sexual activities. Jonathan, who thinks of himself as "a sculptor of talent" (128) genuinely desires Griffin and believes that Griffin will grow as a man and an actor if he submits to his power: "I want to teach you how to accept the fact of being desired" (139). Griffin gives in and leaves his family without explanation. Jane is the last to find out that Griffin's affair is not with a younger woman but with an older man.

Jane develops her own overpowering desires that are quite independent from Griffin's escapades: when the telephone repairman Milos Saworski, a Polish immigrant with limited command of English, enters her house, she is completely overwhelmed by what she experiences as his unearthly beauty. After Griffin leaves, her pursuit of this "angel-man" becomes more determined and she becomes a living contradiction to Jonathan's assessment of women as sexually mostly passive and incapable of such aggressive pursuit. She asks Milos, himself married and a young father of a dying infant, to model for her in the nude, a proposal which he accepts with knowing innocence and an entirely masculine submission that mirrors the scene between Jonathan and Griffin. Jane's gaze upon Milos' beauty parallels Jonathan's desire for Griffin.

Death and betrayal are common themes in the novel - Jane and Griffin's son Will is estranged from both parents; Milos's baby dies due to his inaction and his wife's insistence to keep the baby out of the reach of doctors for religious reasons; Jonathon's 21-year-old son is killed by revolutionaries in Peru. These events spark the characters to re-think their current choices. Jonathon's sad news is brought by his former wife which makes him to realize the wrong-doings of his own marriage and hence affair with Griffin, leading him to release Griffin and send him back to his own family.

A few months later, in April, the novel comes back to Jane, Griffin and Will, a happy family unit watching a procession of Swans released from their winter domicile indoors. With the help of her mother's money, Jane has bought the house and made it the home she desired. The novel comes full circle to the peacefulness of the beginning, but this renewed peacefulness seems less precarious because it has been tempered by essential conflict and near break-up. The novel ends on a surprisingly hopeful note with a vision of spring and new life.

== Characters ==
Jane Kincaid, property artist; her real name was Aura Lee Terry and she is originally from Plantation, Louisiana in the United States;

Griffin Kincaid, her husband; an actor just turned 30;

Will Kincaid, seven years old, their son;

Jonathan Crawford, director;

Zoë Walker, an actress, 21;

Nigel Dexter, actor, Griffin's friend;

Mercy Bowman, Will's babysitter.

== Critical reception ==
Kirkus Reviews gave a negative review.
