= William Whitehead (Canadian writer) =

Canadian writer, actor and filmmaker

William (Bill) Whitehead
- Born: William Frederick Whitehead; August 16, 1931; Hamilton, Ontario, Canada
- Died: February 1, 2018 (aged 86); Toronto, Ontario, Canada
- Occupations: Radio and television documentary writer, memoirist, filmmaker, actor
- Partners: Timothy Findley, Trevor Green
- Writing career
- Language: English
- Period: 1960s-2010s
- Notable works: Dieppe 1942, The National Dream: Building the Impossible Railway, Wild Africa, Words to Live By

William Frederick (Bill) Whitehead (August 16, 1931 – February 1, 2018) was a Canadian writer, actor and filmmaker. Whitehead is best known as a writer of radio and television documentaries and as the former partner of the late Canadian writer Timothy Findley.

== Background ==
Whitehead was born in Hamilton, Ontario, to Marjorie and Berkeley Kyle Whitehead. His parents had moved there from Saskatchewan, and the family moved back to Regina when Whitehead was a child. His parents subsequently divorced due to his father's epilepsy-related inability to maintain stable employment; Whitehead did not see his father again until his late teens.

His initial career goal was to become an entomologist — by age 12 he was already a member of the Saskatchewan Natural History Society — but he also had a passion for theatre. He studied biology and theatre arts at the University of Saskatchewan, receiving a Bachelor of Arts degree in 1953 and a Master of Arts degree in 1955, but decided against pursuing work as a biologist because he found it depended too strongly on having to kill animals.

He moved to Ontario in 1957 to become an actor, having several small roles with the Stratford Festival while serving as a propmaster and stage manager. He met Findley, at the time also a Stratford Festival actor, in 1962, with their lifelong relationship beginning when Findley appeared in a CBC Television production of Jules Feiffer's play Crawling Arnold and Whitehead invited him over to watch it because Findley didn't own a television set.

== Career ==
When Findley left the theatre to concentrate on writing fiction, Whitehead simultaneously took a job writing science documentaries for the CBC Radio documentary series The Learning Stage. He remained a writer of radio and television documentaries, including the documentary film Fields of Endless Day, over 100 episodes of the CBC Television series The Nature of Things, and many episodes of the CBC Radio series Ideas.

He also co-wrote several works with Findley, including the television documentaries Dieppe 1942 and The National Dream: Building the Impossible Railway. Whitehead and Findley won the ACTRA Award for Best Writing in a Television Documentary at the 4th ACTRA Awards in 1975 for The National Dream.

Following Findley's death in 2002, Whitehead compiled and edited the posthumous collection Journeyman: Travels of a Writer. In March 2004, approximately two years after Findley's death, Whitehead donated a collection of Findley's theatre memorabilia to the University of Guelph. He subsequently began a new relationship, with Trevor Green.

In September 2012, his memoir Words to Live By was published by Cormorant Books. The book was a shortlisted nominee for the Stephen Leacock Award in 2013.

In 2014 he served on the jury of the Dayne Ogilvie Prize for LGBT writers, selecting Tamai Kobayashi as that year's winner.

He died at his home in Toronto on February 1, 2018, having earlier been diagnosed with lung cancer.
