= Timothy Findley =

Canadian novelist and playwright

Timothy Findley OC OOnt
- Born: Timothy Irving Frederick Findley; October 30, 1930; Toronto, Ontario
- Died: June 20, 2002 (aged 71); Brignoles, France
- Occupations: novelist, short story writer, playwright, actor
- Partner: Bill Whitehead
- Writing career
- Language: English
- Period: 1960s–2000s
- Notable works: The Wars, Headhunter, Pilgrim, Elizabeth Rex
- Notable awards: Governor General's Award, Trillium Book Award
- Movement: Southern Ontario Gothic

Timothy Irving Frederick Findley (October 30, 1930 – June 20, 2002) was a Canadian novelist and playwright. He was also informally known by the nickname Tiff or Tiffy, an acronym of his initials.

== Biography ==
=== Early life ===
One of three sons, Findley was born in Toronto, Ontario, to Allan Gilmour Findley, a stockbroker, and his wife, the former Margaret Maude Bull. His paternal grandfather was president of Massey-Harris, the farm-machinery company. He was raised in the upper class Rosedale district of the city, attending boarding school at St. Andrew's College (although leaving during grade 10 for health reasons). He pursued a career in the arts, studying dance and acting, and had significant success as an actor before turning to writing. He was part of the original Stratford Festival company in the 1950s, acting alongside Alec Guinness, and appeared in the first production of Thornton Wilder's The Matchmaker at the Edinburgh Festival. He also played Peter Pumpkin in Sunshine Sketches, the CBC Television adaptation of Stephen Leacock's Sunshine Sketches of a Little Town.

=== Career ===
Though Findley had declared his homosexuality as a teenager, he married actress/photographer Janet Reid in 1959. The union lasted only three months and was dissolved by divorce or annulment two years later. He eventually became the domestic partner of writer Bill Whitehead, whom he met in 1962.

Through Wilder, Findley became a close friend of actress Ruth Gordon, whose work as a screenwriter and playwright inspired Findley to consider writing as well. After Findley published his first short story in the Tamarack Review, Gordon encouraged him to pursue writing more actively, and he eventually left acting in the 1960s.

Findley's first two novels, The Last of the Crazy People (1967) and The Butterfly Plague (1969), were originally published in Britain and the United States after having been rejected by Canadian publishers. Findley's third novel, The Wars, was published to great acclaim in 1977 and went on to win the Governor General's Award for English-language fiction. Director Robin Phillips subsequently adapted the novel into the 1983 theatrical film The Wars.

Findley received a Governor General's Award, the Canadian Authors Association Award, an ACTRA Award, the Order of Ontario, the Trillium Book Award, and in 1985 he was appointed an Officer of the Order of Canada. He was a founding member and chair of the Writers' Union of Canada, and a president of the Canadian chapter of PEN International.

His writing was typical of the Southern Ontario Gothic style – Findley, in fact, first invented its name — and was heavily influenced by Jungian psychology. Mental illness, gender and sexuality were frequent recurring themes in his work. Many of his novels centred on a protagonist who was struggling to find the moral and ethical and rational course of action in a situation that had spun wildly out of control. His characters often carried dark personal secrets, and were often conflicted – sometimes to the point of psychosis — by these burdens.

Findley and Whitehead also collaborated on several documentary projects in the 1970s, including the television miniseries The National Dream and Dieppe 1942. Whitehead and Findley won the ACTRA Award for Best Writing in a Television Documentary at the 4th ACTRA Awards in 1975 for The National Dream.

He publicly mentioned his homosexuality, passingly and perhaps for the first time, on a broadcast of the programme The Shulman File in the 1970s, taking host Morton Shulman completely by surprise.

Findley and Whitehead resided at Stone Orchard, a farm near Cannington, Ontario, and in the south of France. In 1996, Findley was honoured by the French government, who declared him a Chevalier de l'Ordre des arts et des lettres.

Findley was also the author of several dramas for television and stage. Elizabeth Rex, his most successful play, premiered at the Stratford Festival to rave reviews and won a Governor General's award. His 1993 play The Stillborn Lover was adapted by Shaftesbury Films into the television film External Affairs, which aired on CBC Television in 1999. Shadows, first performed in 2001, was his last completed work. Findley was also an active mentor to a number of young Canadian writers, including Marnie Woodrow and Elizabeth Ruth.

In the final years of Findley's life, declining health led him to move his Canadian residence to Stratford, Ontario, and Stone Orchard was purchased by Canadian dancer Rex Harrington.

In 2002, he was inducted into Canada's Walk of Fame.

=== Death ===
Findley died on June 20, 2002, in Brignoles, France, not far from his house in Cotignac. Tiff: A Life of Timothy Findley, a biography by Sherrill Grace, was published in 2020.

Findley and the development of his theatrical play The Stillborn Lover were profiled by Terence Macartney-Filgate in the 1992 documentary film Timothy Findley: Anatomy of a Writer.

== Quotations ==
- "When we have stopped killing animals as though they were so much refuse, we will stop killing one another. But the highways show our indifference to death, so long as it is someone else's. It is an attitude of the human mind I do not grasp. I have no point of connection with it. People drive in such a way that you think they do not believe in death. Their own lives are their business, but my life is not their business. I cannot refrain from terrific anger when I am threatened so casually by strangers on a public road." – from 1965 journal, at p. 16 of Journeyman: Travels of a Writer.
- "A myth is not a lie, as such, but only the truth in size twelve shoes. Its gestures are wider—its voice is projected farther—its face has bolder features than reality would dare contrive." – from 1992 speech, reproduced at p. 75 of Journeyman: Travels of a Writer.

== Bibliography ==
=== Novels ===
- The Last of the Crazy People (1967)
- The Butterfly Plague (1969)
- The Wars (1977)
- Famous Last Words (1981)
- Not Wanted on the Voyage (1984)
- The Telling of Lies (1986) (1989)
- Headhunter (1993)
- The Piano Man's Daughter (1995)
- Pilgrim (1999)
- Spadework (2001)

=== Novella ===
- You Went Away (1996)

=== Short story collections ===
- Dinner Along the Amazon (1984)
- Stones (1988)
- Dust to Dust (1997)

=== Drama ===
- The Paper People (1967)
- Don't Let the Angels Fall (1969)
- The Whiteoaks of Jalna (1972)
- The Newcomers (1977)
- Can You See Me Yet? (1977)
- Catsplay (1978)
- The Stillborn Lover (1993)
- The Trials of Ezra Pound (2000)
- Elizabeth Rex (2001)
- Shadows (2001)

=== Docudrama ===
- The National Dream: Building the Impossible Railway (1974)
- Dieppe 1942 (1979)

=== Memoirs ===
- Inside Memory: Pages from a Writer's Workbook (1990)
- From Stone Orchard (1998)
- Journeyman: Travels of a Writer (2003)
