= Martha Henry =

American-Canadian actress (1938–2021)

Martha Henry CC OOnt
- Henry as "A" in Three Tall Women in 2021
- Born: Martha Kathleen Buhs; February 17, 1938; Detroit, Michigan, U.S.
- Died: October 21, 2021 (aged 83); Stratford, Ontario, Canada
- Other name: Martha Henry-Beattie
- Education: Carnegie Mellon University (BFA); National Theatre School (GrDip)
- Occupations: Actress; theater director
- Spouses: Donnelly Rhodes (m. 1962, divorced) Douglas Rain (divorced) Rod Beattie (m. 1989, divorced)
- Children: 1

Martha Kathleen Henry (née Buhs; February 17, 1938 – October 21, 2021) was an American-Canadian actress and director of stage and screen. During her lifetime, she was considered one of her country’s most acclaimed and accomplished thespians. She was the first graduate of the National Theatre School of Canada in 1961, and was most noted for her theatre work at the Stratford Festival. She was the recipient of numerous accolades, including three Genie Awards for Best Actress, and the Governor General's Performing Arts Award for her contributions to Canadian theatre.

== Early life, family, education and training ==
Martha Kathleen Buhs was born in Detroit, Michigan, on February 17, 1938. Her parents, Kathleen (née Hatch) and Lloyd Howard Buhs, divorced when she was around five years old. She was raised in the northern Detroit suburb of Bloomfield Hills, Michigan, attended the Kingswood School (later Cranbrook Kingswood School), and graduated from the drama department at Carnegie Institute of Technology (which became Carnegie Mellon University) before moving to Canada in 1959. She later adopted the stage surname Henry, the surname of her first husband Donnelly Rhodes, whom she married in 1962.

Henry performed at Crest Theatre upon her arrival in Toronto. Soon, she accepted into the first class at the National Theatre School in Montreal. In 1961, the Theatre School took its students to Stratford to perform scene selections for the Festival company. Henry caught the attention of Artistic Director Michael Langham, who offered her a spot in the 1962 company based entirely on her performance that day. Accepting the offer would have required Henry to leave the Theatre School partway through the three-year program, however NTS Director Powys Thomas advised her to take the offer, saying she would learn more with the Stratford company than at the Theatre School. She took the offer and was awarded a diploma ahead of the inaugural class, making her the Theatre School's first graduate.

== Leading actress at Stratford ==
During Henry's first season at the Stratford Festival(1962) she played Miranda to William Hutt's first Prospero in The Tempest, and Lady Macduff in Macbeth. Between the 1962 and 1980 seasons, she played leading roles in 40 productions, and made her directing debut in 1980. Some of her roles during this time included Cordelia in King Lear (1964), Viola in Twelfth Night (1966), Titania in A Midsummer Night's Dream (1968), Desdemona in Othello (1973), Isabella in Measure for Measure (1975-1976), Olga in Three Sisters (1976), Lady Anne in Richard III (1977), and Paulina in The Winter's Tale (1978). During brief periods away from Stratford, Henry performed elsewhere in Canada and abroad, including Manitoba Theatre Centre, Shaw Festival, Broadway, New York's Lincoln Centre, and London's West End.

Henry and three other directors (Urjo Kareda, Peter Moss and Pam Brighton) were appointed to lead Stratford's 1981 season after the resignation of Artistic Director Robin Phillips, but the group was dismissed a few months later when the Board of Directors had lined up English stage director John Dexter to replace them. A major uproar ensued across the Canadian arts community, and Immigration Minister Lloyd Axworthy denied Dexter a work permit. A month later, Canadian director John Hirsch was appointed artistic director for the 1981 season. The "Gang of Four" fallout caused Henry and other Stratford veterans to work away from the Festival for many years, but the enduring result was noted by actor R.H. Thomson as "Stratford turning (a corner) and becoming a deeply Canadian enterprise".

== Directing and later stage career ==
After 1980, Henry performed and directed at major arts venues across North America, including Tarragon Theatre, Canadian Stage, Globe Theatre, the National Arts Centre, Roy Thompson Hall, Citadel Theatre, Theatre Calgary, Manitoba Theatre Centre, Shaw Festival, Neptune Theatre, and Carnegie Mellon University.

Henry was artistic director of the Grand Theatre in London, Ontario, from 1988 to 1995, during which time she programmed a wide variety of contemporary works, including newer plays such as Oleanna by David Mamet, The Rez Sisters by Tomson Highway, and The Stillborn Lover by Timothy Findley.

Henry's return to the Stratford stage in 1994 as Mary Tyrone in Long Day's Journey Into Night was widely acclaimed, and the production was remounted for the 1995 season. A filmed version of the production earned her a Genie Award for Best Actress at the 17th Genie Awards. The return also marked the start of a second lengthy run for Henry at Stratford, with her performing in leading and supporting roles, directing, and instructing. In 2007, she was appointed director of Stratford's Birmingham Conservatory for Classical Theatre Training, a program that has trained many promising new Canadian actors. Her production of All My Sons by Arthur Miller was included in multiple theatre reviewers' lists of top theatre productions in 2016. In 2017, she took over leadership of Stratford's Michael Langham Workshop for Classical Direction.

In 2018, in her 44th season of performing, at age 80, Henry played Prospero in The Tempest, directed by Antoni Cimolino. Chris Jones, theater critic for the Chicago Tribune, wrote "in all my years watching shows at this theater, a miragelike fountain of excellence ... I have never seen anything quite like the experience of watching Henry".

During the COVID-19 pandemic in 2021, Henry played the role of "A" in Three Tall Women by Edward Albee at Stratford's Studio Theatre. In his review of the production, J. Kelly Nestruck of the Globe and Mail said "Henry’s performance is a reminder of how much more daringly theatrical her generation of stage actors – she’s now in her 80s – can be". A stage to screen adaptation of Henry's final performance in Three Tall Women was captured by director Barry Avrich months before Henry died; following its television broadcast in 2022, it received several Canadian Screen Award nominations at the 11th Canadian Screen Awards in 2023, including a posthumous nod for Henry in the category Best Performance in a Television Film or Miniseries.

== Television roles ==
Notable television roles include Catherine in Empire, Inc., the prime minister's mother in H_{2}O, and the owner of the Chateau Rousseau in Ken Finkleman's At the Hotel. In 1994, she starred in the TV film And Then There Was One.

== Honours ==
Henry was made an officer of the Order of Canada in 1981, and promoted to companion in 1990. She was made a member of the Order of Ontario in 1994. Henry received a Governor General's Performing Arts Award for her lifetime contribution to Canadian theatre in 1996.

== Personal life ==
Henry's marriages to Rhodes and Douglas Rain ended in divorce. She married Rod Beattie and, although they later separated, they remained married until her death. She had one child (Emma) with Rain.

=== Death ===
Henry died of cancer shortly after midnight on October 21, 2021, at her home in Stratford, Ontario, twelve days after her final stage appearance in Three Tall Women.
