= Grand Theatre (London, Ontario) =

Theatre in London, Ontario, Canada

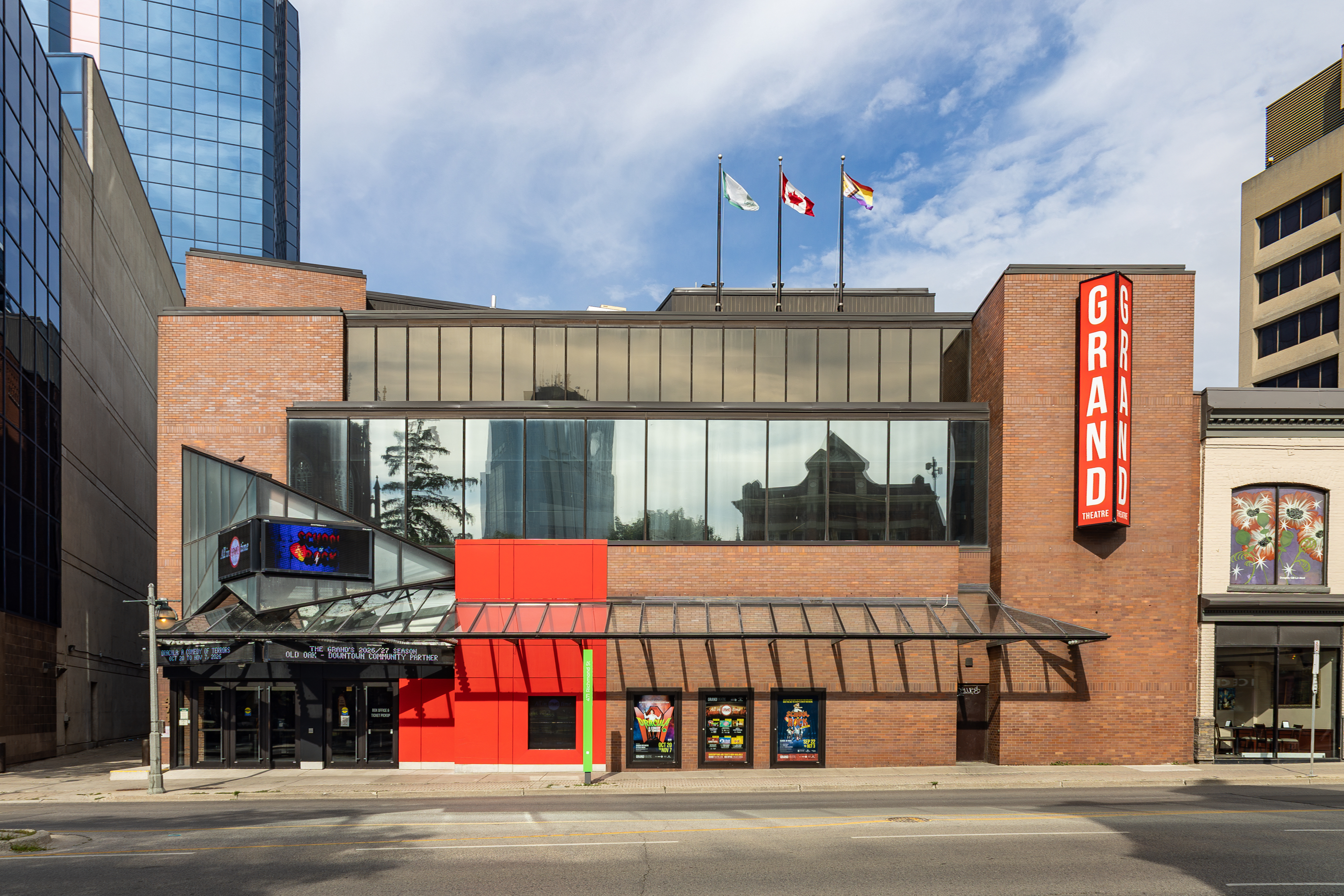
- Interactive map of Grand Theatre (London, Ontario)
- Address: 471 Richmond Street; London, Ontario; N6A 3E4
- Coordinates: 42.98592°N 81.251063°W
- Capacity: main auditorium (839); The McManus Theatre (150)
- Type: Proscenium Arch theatre
- Current use: Professional and amateur theatre

Construction
- Opened: September 9, 1901
- Years active: 1901-

Website
- Official website

The Grand Theatre is a professional theatre located at 471 Richmond Street just south of Dufferin Avenue in London, Ontario, Canada.

Its main Spriet Stage has a seating capacity of 839 with a regular season running from September to May. In addition, it has a secondary venue called The Auburn Theatre (previously the McManus Theatre), located on the lower floor with a seating capacity of 150.

== History ==
The theatre opened on September 9, 1901 under the ownership of the theatre magnate, Ambrose Small who reportedly considered this theatre his favourite of his numerous similar holdings. He disappeared mysteriously on December 2, 1919. That day, Mr. Small deposited one million dollars in a Toronto bank account, lunched with his wife and was never seen again. Weeks after his disappearance, the night watchman swore he saw Mr. Small entering The Grand Theatre. Despite this lead, police were never able to close the file. It is rumoured that he haunts the building to this day. This building was investigated in the first episode of The Girly Ghosthunters in 2005.

With the rise of film entertainment, the theatre was equipped for film presentation when it was sold to Famous Players in 1924. In 1945, the theatre chain sold the building to the London Little Theatre company for a relatively modest price and the theatre became an amateur stage venue. It was one of Canada's most active and successful amateur theatre companies.

In 1971, the theatre began a three-year process to become a fully professional regional theatre. In 1975, the governing board decided to react to the deteriorating state of the building with a major reconstruction costing five million dollars that was completed in 1978. The reconstruction included reinforcement of the main stage's proscenium arch as the sole major component of the building's original design and the addition of the McManus Studio as a secondary venue. The architectural firm that undertook the renovations was awarded a Governor General's award for their re-design of The Grand.

The Grand is an excellent example of the Proscenium Arch Theatre and is one of the more traditional forms of theatrical design. It was designed to send music and sound from the stage into the audience.

Among the notable actors who have performed at The Grand are: W.C. Fields, Sarah Bernhardt, Michael Redgrave, Donald O'Connor, Sidney Poitier, Jessica Tandy, Hume Cronyn, Maggie Smith, Michael Burgess, William Hutt, Martha Henry, Karen Kain, Victor Garber, Sandra Oh, and Leonard Nimoy.

=== COVID-19 ===
The Grand Theatre suspended the remainder of its 2019/2020 theatre season in March 2020 due to the global COVID-19 coronavirus pandemic. In June 2020, it was announced that the entire 2020/2021 theatre season was cancelled.

== The High School Project ==
The Grand Theatre's High School Project is unique in North America. It gives high school students from London and surrounding area the chance to work with professional directors, choreographers, musical directors, and stage managers.

Annually (since 1998), a full-length musical is performed on the main stage featuring a full cast of high school students. The original intention was for the productions to be annually cycled between a Broadway musical, a Shakespeare piece, and a Canadian piece. However, due to the success of West Side Story in 1998, the High School Project remained a Broadway musical from 2000 on.

Students also assist in stage management, in the painting of the set, and the building of costume and props.

In 2006, the High School Project added a Shakespearean production, to be performed in the spring in the Auburn Theatre, leaving the Musical component to be performed in the fall on the MainStage.

The following is a list of High School Project stage productions that have been performed on the Grand Theatre's main stage:

- West Side Story (1998)
- A Midsummer Night's Dream (1999)
- Guys and Dolls (2000)
- Hello, Dolly! (2001)
- Oliver! (2002)
- The Music Man (2003)
- Fiddler on the Roof (2004)
- Oklahoma! (2005)
- The Sound of Music (Fall 2005)
- Twelfth Night (Spring 2006, McManus Studio)
- West Side Story (Fall 2006)
- Romeo and Juliet (Spring 2007; McManus Studio)
- Les Misérables: School Edition (Fall 2007)
- Listen to the Wind (Spring 2008; McManus Studio)
- The Pirates of Penzance (Fall 2008)
- As You Like It (Spring 2009; McManus Studio)
- Grease (Fall 2009)
- Macbeth (Spring 2010; McManus Studio)
- Anything Goes (Fall 2010)
- The Odyssey (Spring 2011; McManus Studio)
- Footloose (Fall 2011)
- A Midsummer Night's Dream (Spring 2012)
- My Fair Lady (Fall 2012)
- Taming of the Shrew (Spring 2013)
- Legally Blonde (Fall 2013)
- The Importance of Being Earnest (Spring 2014)
- The Addams Family: A New Musical (Fall 2014)
- Much Ado About Nothing (Spring 2015)
- Hello Dolly! (Fall 2015)
- Julius Caesar (play) (Spring 2016)
- Les Misérables: School Edition (Fall 2016)
- Shakespeare: the Mixtape (Spring 2017)
- Evita (Fall 2017)
- Prom Queen (Fall 2018)
- Titanic The Musical (Fall 2019)
- The High School Project Online (Fall 2020)
- The Great Grand Road Trip (Fall 2021)
- Into the Woods (Fall 2022)
- The Phantom of the Opera (Fall 2023)
- ' ' Matilda The Musical ' ' (Fall 2024)

== Other programming ==
The Grand Theatre also presents a series of productions in the Auburn Theatre called The UnderGrand series consisting of more alternative fare. In addition to individual plays, there is the Playwright's Cabaret, a playwriting showcase where local playwrights are invited to write 10 or 30 minute sketches for public readings. The Auburn is also home to the Grand Theatre's presentations of Theatre for Young Audiences (TYA).

== Artistic Directors ==
- Peter Dearing (1957-1968)
- Heinar Pillar (1971–1976)
- William Hutt (1976–1980)
- Bernard Hopkins (1980–1983)
- Robin Phillips (1983-1984)
- Don Shipley (1984-1986)
- Larry Lillo (1986-1988)
- Martha Henry (1988–1995)
- Michael Shamata (1995–1999)
- Kelly Handerek (1999–2001)
- Susan Ferley (2001-2016)
- Dennis Garnhum (2016–2023)
- Rachel Peake (2023–Present)
