= William Hutt (actor) =

Canadian actor of stage, television and film

William Hutt CC OOnt MM
- Born: William Ian DeWitt Hutt; May 2, 1920; Toronto, Ontario, Canada
- Died: June 27, 2007 (aged 87); Stratford, Ontario, Canada
- Education: Trinity College, Toronto (BA)
- Occupation: Actor
- Years active: 1955–2007
- Awards: Canada's Walk of Fame

William Ian DeWitt Hutt, CC, OOnt, MM (May 2, 1920 – June 27, 2007) was a Canadian actor of stage, television and film. Hutt's distinguished career spanned over 50 years and won him many accolades and awards. While his base throughout his career remained at the Stratford Festival in Stratford, Ontario, he appeared on the stage in London, New York and across Canada.

== Early life ==
Hutt was born in Toronto, Ontario, the second of three children. A graduate of Toronto's Vaughan Road Collegiate Institute (now Vaughan Road Academy), he served five years as a medic during World War II, receiving a Military Medal for "bravery in the field". After the war, he received his BA in 1948 from Trinity College at the University of Toronto, and subsequently joined the Stratford Festival of Canada for its first season in 1953.

About his early life, theatre director Richard Nielsen said, "As a young man, he was openly gay at a time when being openly gay was a very dangerous identity. He shunned violence, but he volunteered as a medic in the Second World War, and he later won the Military Medal for his services; and this I found most fascinating: he committed to a career in theatre when such a thing as the 'Canadian theatre' simply did not exist."

== Career ==
Hutt's acting career was centered around the Stratford Festival where he won acclaim in many roles including those of King Lear (1988), James Tyrone in Eugene O'Neill's Long Day's Journey into Night (1994–1995) (a production which was subsequently filmed), and Lady Bracknell in The Importance of Being Earnest (1975–1979). He played such Shakespearean roles as Hamlet, Lear, Falstaff, Prospero, Macbeth and Titus Andronicus. He also performed at the Crest Theatre, Shaw Festival, Citadel Theatre, Royal Manitoba Theatre Centre, Vancouver Playhouse, National Arts Centre, Chichester Festival, and Bristol Old Vic.

He was artistic director of the Grand Theatre in London, Ontario, from 1976 to 1980.

He appeared in film and on television in such roles as Le Moyne in the 2003 film The Statement and Sir John A. Macdonald in the Canadian television production of The National Dream, as well as in Timothy Findley's The Wars.

== Awards ==
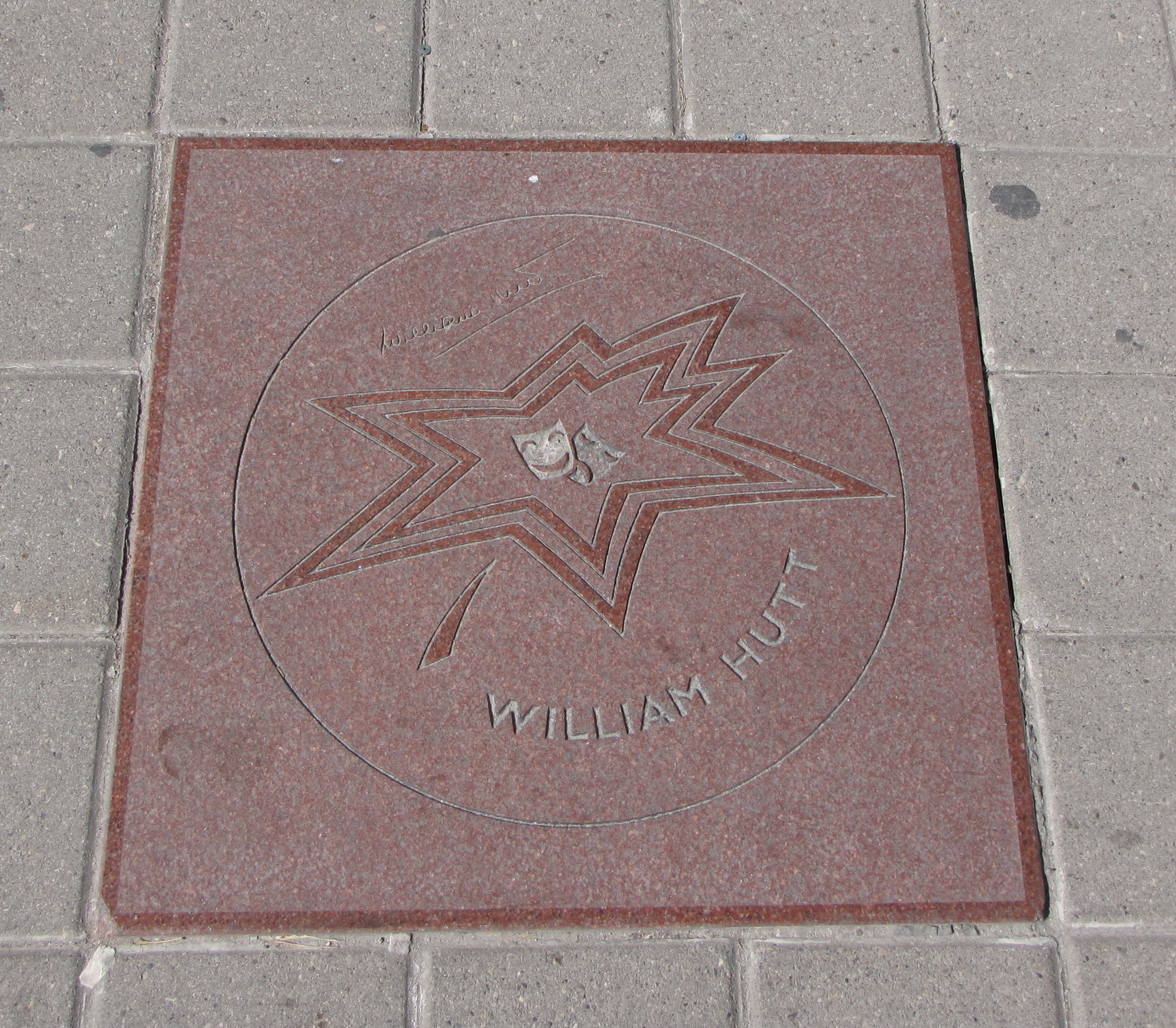
Hutt's star on Canada's Walk of Fame

In 1969 he was made a Companion of the Order of Canada and in 1992 he was awarded the Order of Ontario. He also received an Honorary Doctor of Letters degree from McMaster University in Hamilton, Ontario, in October 1997, and in 2000 was inducted into Canada's Walk of Fame. Hutt was a recipient of a Governor General's Performing Arts Award in 1992. He was awarded the 1996 Sam Wanamaker Prize. One of the very few people in North America to have appeared on a postage stamp while still alive, he appeared on a stamp that celebrated the Stratford Festival's anniversary and showed him in character as Prospero.

In 2000, a bridge on Waterloo Street North that crosses the Avon River in downtown Stratford, Ontario, was named the "William Hutt Bridge" in his honour. The bridge lies a few metres away from the house in which Hutt had lived for many years.

== Later life and death ==
Hutt retired from the Stratford stage in 2005 with his most renowned role in a reprise of Prospero in The Tempest . He appeared in the television series Slings and Arrows as an ailing stage icon who wants to play King Lear one last time. He had planned to return to Stratford in 2007 in a production of A Delicate Balance, but had to cancel due to poor health.

Hutt was diagnosed with leukemia, and died peacefully in his sleep on June 27, 2007, in Stratford, Ontario.

== Filmography ==
=== Films ===
Film
Year	Title	Role	Notes
1957	Oedipus Rex	Chorus Leader	a film version of the Canadian Stratford Festival production
1960	There Was a Crooked Man	Unnamed role	
1961	Macbeth	Ross	
1968	The Fixer	The Tzar	
1979	The Shape of Things to Come	Lomax (voice)	
1983	The Wars	Mr. Ross	
1984	Covergirl	Alton Cockridge	
1996	Long Day's Journey into Night	James	Winner, Genie Award for Best Actor
2003	The Statement	Le Moyne	

=== TV ===
Television
Year	Title	Role	Notes
1955	First Performance	Unnamed role	(TV Series), 1 episode: "The Colonel and the Lady"
1955	Scope (TV Series)	Bernardo	(TV Series), 3 episodes: "Oh, Canada!", "Hamlet" and "The Colonel and the Lady"
1955	Playbill (TV Series)	Unnamed roles	(TV Series), 1 episode: "The Mayerling Riddle" and "The Typewriter Murder"
1955-1961	Encounter (1958 TV series)Encounter (TV Series)	Unnamed role (1955)/ Harbon (1957)/ Heathcliff (1957)/ Serge (1961)/ 2 Unnamed roles (1961)	(TV Series), 6 episodes
1956	The Hill	Unnamed role	(TV Movie)
1956-1959	Folio	Unnamed role (1955)/ Gloumov, the Scoundrel (1958)/ Rakitin (1958)/ Nicholas Ivanov (1959)	(TV Series), 4 episodes
1958	Armchair Theatre	General Galway	(TV Series), 1 episode: "The Greatest Man in the World"
1958	On Camera	Conrad	(TV Series), 1 episode: "The Devil's Bar"
1959-1960	Startime	Edward Chamberlayne	(TV Series), 2 episodes: "The Secret Agent" and "The Cocktail Party"
1960	ITV Television Playhouse	Lemesle	(TV Series), 1 episode: "The Unquiet Spirit"
1961-1964	Festival	Captain Charles (1962)/ James (segment "The Collection")(1962)/ Inquisitor (1962)/ Uncle Vanya (1964)/ Unnamed role (1962)	(TV Series), 6 episodes
1962	Cyrano De Bergerac	Le Bret	(TV Movie)
1962	Playdate	The Interrogator	(TV Series), 1 episode: "The Prisoner"
1964	The Wayne and Shuster Hour	Unnamed role	(TV Series), 1 episode: "From Bombay with Love"
1966	Henry V	Chorus	(TV Movie)
1973	The Starlost	Dr. Pete Marshall	(TV Series), 1 episode: "The Beehive"
1974	The Naked Mind	Unnamed roles	(TV Series), 4 episodes
1974	The National Dream: Building the Impossible Railway	John A. Macdonald	(TV Mini-Series documentary), 5 episodes
1975	The First Night of Pygmalion	George Bernard Shaw	(TV Movie)
1982	The Elephant Man	Bishop How	(TV Movie)
1987	Much Ado About Nothing	Leonato	(TV Movie)
1998	Emily of New Moon	Reverend Pitch / Satan	(TV Series), 1 episode: "The Devil's Punchbowl"
2000	Twice in a Lifetime	Lionel	(TV Series), 1 episode: "Take Two"
2006	Slings and Arrows	Charles	(TV Series), 6 episodes
2008	The Trojan Horse	Miles Fortnum	(TV Mini-Series), 1 episode: "Part One"
