= Avon Theatre =

Theatre in Stratford, Ontario

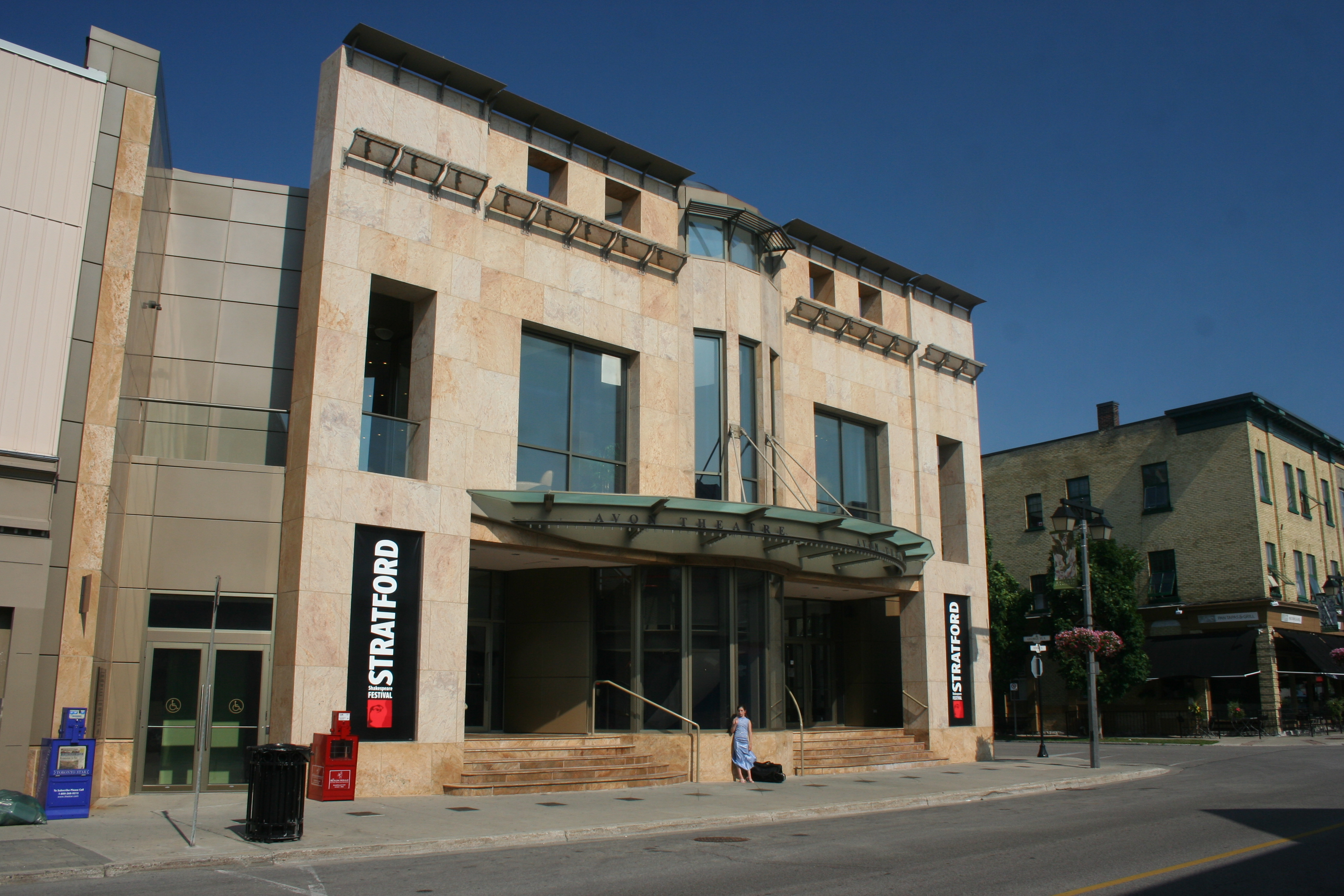
- Former names: Theatre Albert; Griffin’s Opera House; Majestic Theatre

General information
- Location: 99 Downie Street; Stratford, ON; N5A 4M9, Stratford, Ontario
- Coordinates: 43.36891°N 80.981118°W
- Named for: Stratford-upon-Avon
- Opened: 4 January 1901; 125 years ago 28 May 2002; 24 years ago
- Renovated: 1964-67 (Pounder Brothers Company); 2001-02 (DLIA)
- Owner: Stratford Festival

Technical details
- Floor count: 2

Design and construction
- Architect: Harry J. Powell

Other information
- Seating capacity: 1010
- Parking: none

The Avon Theatre (/ˈɑːvɒn/ AH-von) is a performing arts theatre in Stratford, Ontario that serves as a venue of the Stratford Festival. The original theatre was built in 1901 and named Theatre Albert. The building was purchased by the Stratford Festival in 1963, and was rebuilt and opened again in 1967. In 2002 the building was modernized to meet modern-day building standards, as part of the Stratford Festival's 50th-anniversary.

== History and design ==
=== Naming and ownership ===
Originally named Theatre Albert after Stratford resident Albert Brandenberger, the city needed a theatre after the only theatre in town (at the city hall) burned down in 1897. The site of this theatre was purchased from Mary Patterson, the grandmother of future Stratford Festival founder Tom Patterson. The theatre was originally named The House of Polite Vaudeville and Motion Pictures before being changed to Griffin Theatre, and Brandenberger sold the building in 1924. That same year, the theatre was renamed the Majestic Theatre. Ownership changed during the 1940s, and at some point in this period, the theatre received its current name: The Avon Theatre.

=== Prior to Avon Theatre ===
The building operated as a cinema and vaudeville theatre throughout its early years and advertised travel films, which that were typical of the day. Films may have been presented as early as 1913. From 1956 onwards, the venue has been used for professional theatre productions.

=== As the Avon Theatre ===
Before its ownership by the Stratford Festival in 1963, the theatre had several owners. Notably, the theatre was named the Avon Theatre long before being purchased by the Stratford Festival. In 1941, the Theatre Holding Corporation purchased the building from Sarnia Theatres Ltd. From 1961 to 1964, the Stratford Festival produced Gilbert and Sullivan operettas in this theatre—setting the stage for the theatre seasons of '81-85 and '92-95. The carving of the cartouche above the stage was completed by designer Bob Ihrig, and it remains in place until major renovations in 2002.

== Stratford Festival ==
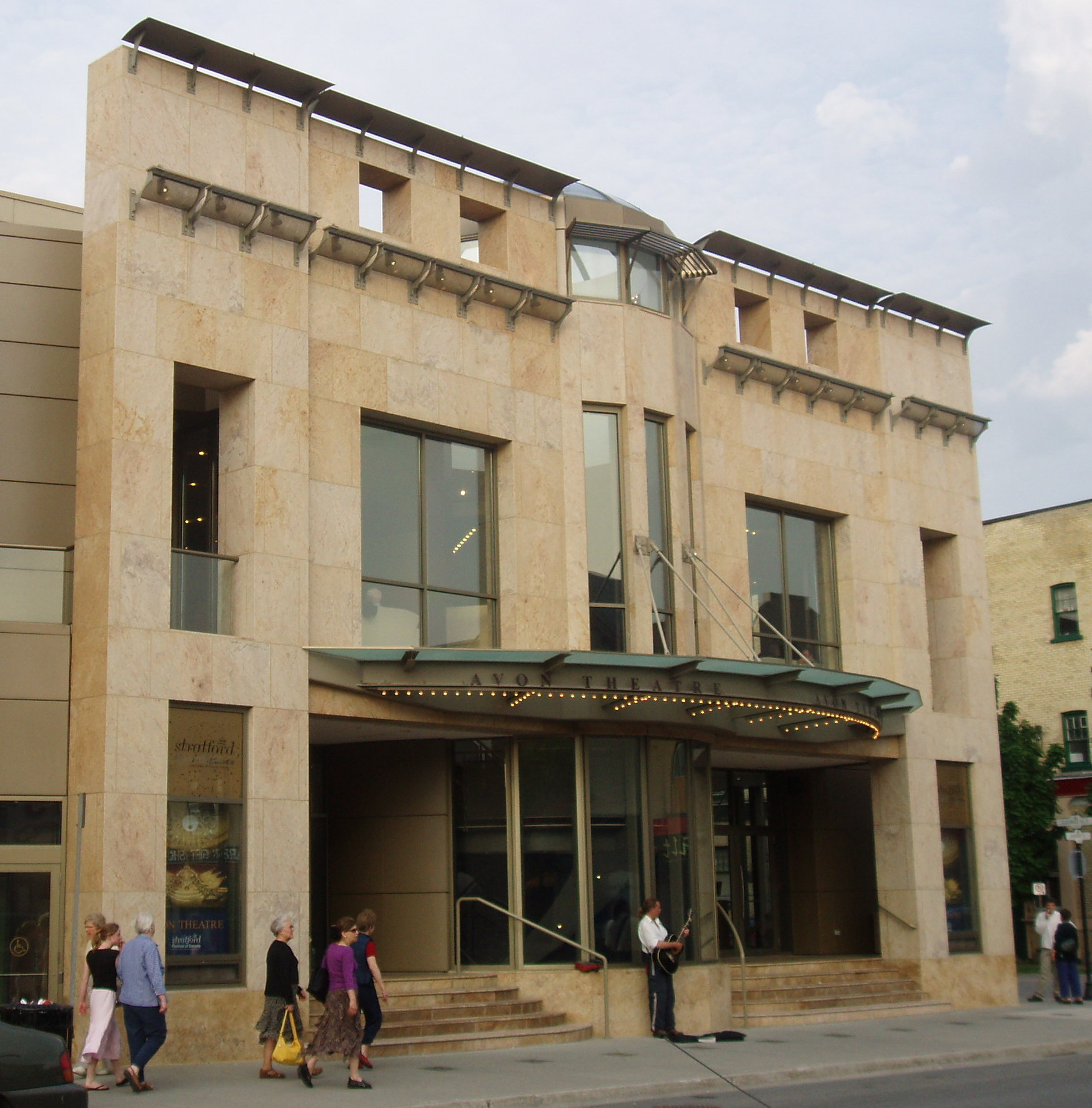
Man standing before Avon theatre where Justin Bieber sang before he was famous.

The building continued as a mixed-use space for many years during the mid-20th century, hosting performances by artists like Joni Mitchell in 1969. The facade has undergone three major changes—specifically in 1967 and 2002. The 2002 renovation was finished as part of the Stratford Festival's 50th anniversary, carried out by Davidson-Langley Incorporated Architects (DLIA) and Marklevitz Architect of Stratford. This enhanced sightlines, the theatre lobby, and various building operations. The structure is connected to the Studio Theatre, which is also owned and operated by the Stratford Festival.

== See also ==
- Festival Theatre
- Tom Patterson Theatre
- Avon River
- Justin Bieber, City of Stratford Bronze Star located here. Awarded July 1, 2011.
