= Jonathan Church =

British stage director (born 1967)

Jonathan Church CBE
- Born: March 1967 (age 59)
- Occupation: Theatre director
- Years active: 1990–present
- Employer: JCTP
- Website: jctproduction.com

Jonathan Church CBE (born March 1967) is a British stage director and producer recognized for influencing the contemporary revival of regional theatre in the UK. As an artistic director, Church has been credited with reversing the decline of Salisbury Playhouse, Birmingham Rep, and Chichester Festival Theatre, and transforming them into commercially successful theatres.

In 2015, Church was honoured for his decade of service as the artistic director of Chichester Festival Theatre, following his decision to step down from the role. During the same year, he formed his own production company in partnership with Delfont Mackintosh Theatres and was announced as the new artistic director of the Sydney Theatre Company, the first international appointment to the position. Church returned to the UK in 2016 to pursue artistic opportunities through his production company.

Between 2017 and 2022, Church was the artistic director of the summer season at Bath Theatre Royal. In 2019, he partnered with Trafalgar Entertainment to launch Jonathan Church Theatre Productions, a new production company with a portfolio spanning the West End, national tours, and international productions.

In October 2025, Church was announced as the new artistic director of the Stratford Festival, the largest repertory theatre company in North America; he is expected to take up the role in November 2026.

== Career ==
=== Early career ===
Church began his professional career as the assistant director at Nottingham Playhouse (1990–1991) and associate director at Derby Playhouse (1994–1995). In 1995, he took up the role of artistic director at Salisbury Playhouse and was tasked with re-opening the theatre after a period of enforced closure. During his four years in the role, he was credited with restoring its artistic reputation and boosting audience engagement. His final production, Colombe by Jean Anouilh, was reviewed as a fitting culmination of his successful "plaudit-laden spell" at the Playhouse. In 1999, Church was appointed associate director at Hampstead Theatre, a position he held for two years.

=== Birmingham ===
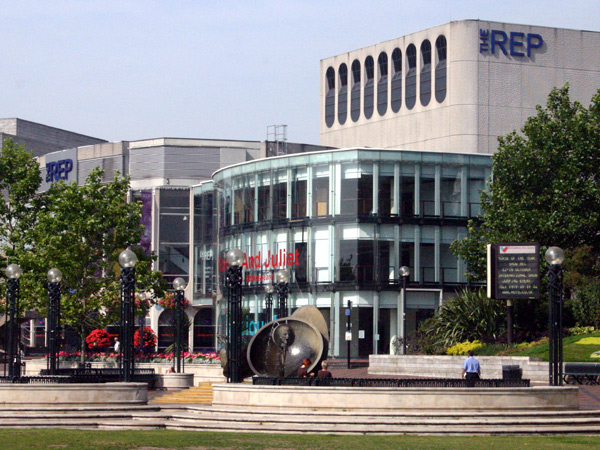
Birmingham Rep in 2005

In 2001, Church became the artistic director at the Birmingham Rep, taking over from Bill Alexander, who had described reaching a "dead-end" in his struggle to attract audiences to the Rep. Church initiated a number of changes that were credited with reviving its fortunes, such as emphasising contemporary works and doubling the number of annual productions. His opening season paired Closer by Patrick Marber with Private Lives by Noël Coward, combining contemporary and more traditional works to attract diverse audiences.

In 2003, Church directed the first revival of the David Hare trilogy, comprising The Absence of War, Murmuring Judges, and Racing Demon. In 2004, it was reported that the box office increase since 2001 was 97% in the main house and 82% in the studio. By the end of his five-year tenure at the Rep, audience sizes had increased by 92%.

=== Chichester ===
In 2006, Church moved to Chichester and was praised for saving the Chichester Festival Theatre (CFT) from closure by almost doubling audience numbers and overseeing a £22m redevelopment of the theatre. A number of Chichester productions during his tenure, including Sweeney Todd and South Downs, subsequently transferred to the West End. Church's production of Singin' in the Rain opened at London's Palace Theatre in 2012.

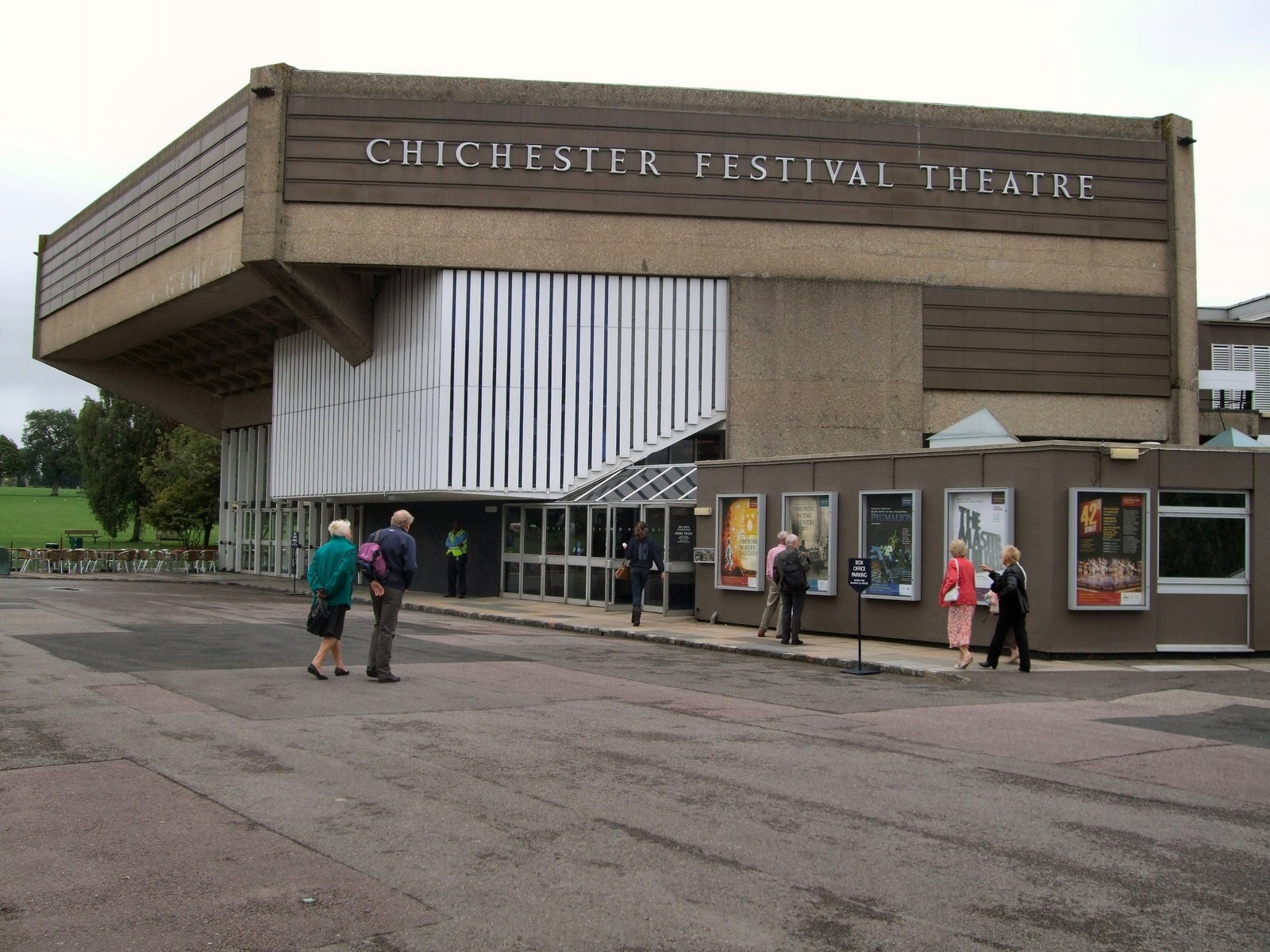
Chichester Festival Theatre in 2010

Other productions he directed at Chichester included The Life and Adventures of Nicholas Nickleby, the first major revival since its RSC premiere in 1980, and The Resistible Rise of Arturo Ui.

Church and the executive director of CFT, Alan Finch, both announced in March 2015 that they would stand down from their positions at the end of September 2016, in order to make way for "new ideas and new energies". Church subsequently formed his own production company in partnership with Delfont Mackintosh Theatres.

=== Sydney ===
At the end of 2015, Church replaced Andrew Upton as artistic director of the Sydney Theatre Company (STC) in Australia. He arrived in 2016 and began programming the 2017 season while managing ongoing commitments in the UK. However, after nine months in the role, Church resigned in May 2016, citing the difficulty of balancing his duties with other professional obligations overseas. Despite his short tenure, he had initiated programme development, built relationships with local artists, and generated expectations of fresh perspectives at STC.

=== JCTP ===
Following his departure from Sydney, Church returned to the UK and focused on developing his career as an independent director and producer. In 2017, he was appointed artistic director of the Theatre Royal Bath summer season, a post he held until 2022. His inaugural season featured works by David Hare, Alan Bennett, Alfred Hitchcock, and Hugh Whitemore, among others, and helped re-establish Bath's summer programming as a fixture of the UK regional calendar.

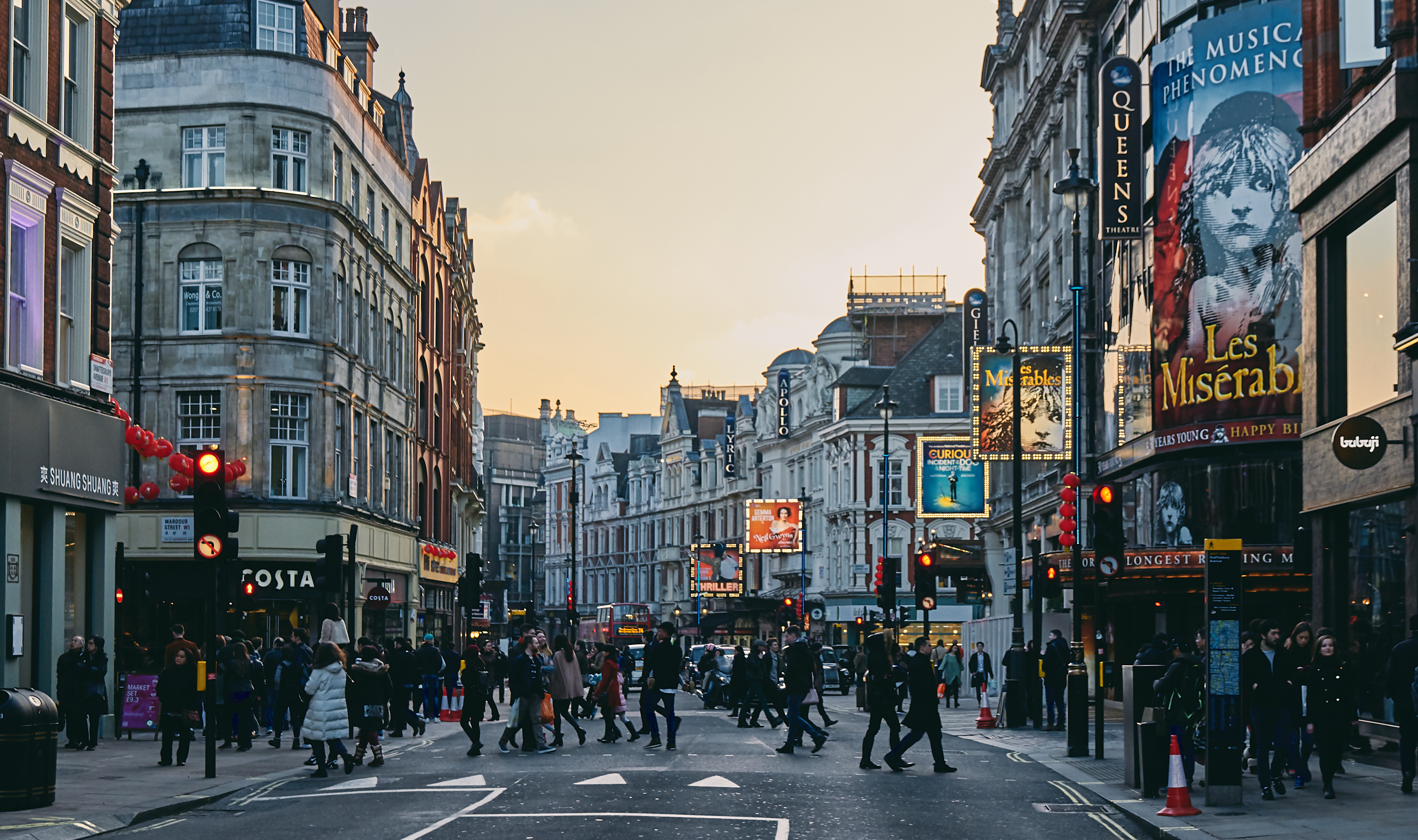
The West End in 2016

In 2019, Church launched Jonathan Church Theatre Productions (JCTP), a new commercial production company created in partnership with Trafalgar Entertainment. The company was formed to produce and manage high-quality drama and musical theatre for London, regional UK venues, and international touring markets. Georgia Gatti was appointed as the first executive producer, and in January 2022 was succeeded by Becky Barber, a theatre producer and manager with extensive experience in both subsidised and commercial theatre.

Under Church's leadership, JCTP has produced and co-produced over a dozen West End and touring productions, many of which he also directed. These include revivals such as:

- The Price (2019, Wyndham's Theatre) starring David Suchet and Brendan Coyle
- The Drifters Girl (2022, Garrick Theatre) starring Beverley Knight
- 42nd Street (2023, Sadler's Wells Theatre) starring Ruthie Henshall and Adam Garcia
- A Man for All Seasons (2025, Harold Pinter Theatre) starring Martin Shaw and Gary Wilmot

In addition to West End work, JCTP‑led productions have toured Japan and China since 2021.

=== Stratford ===
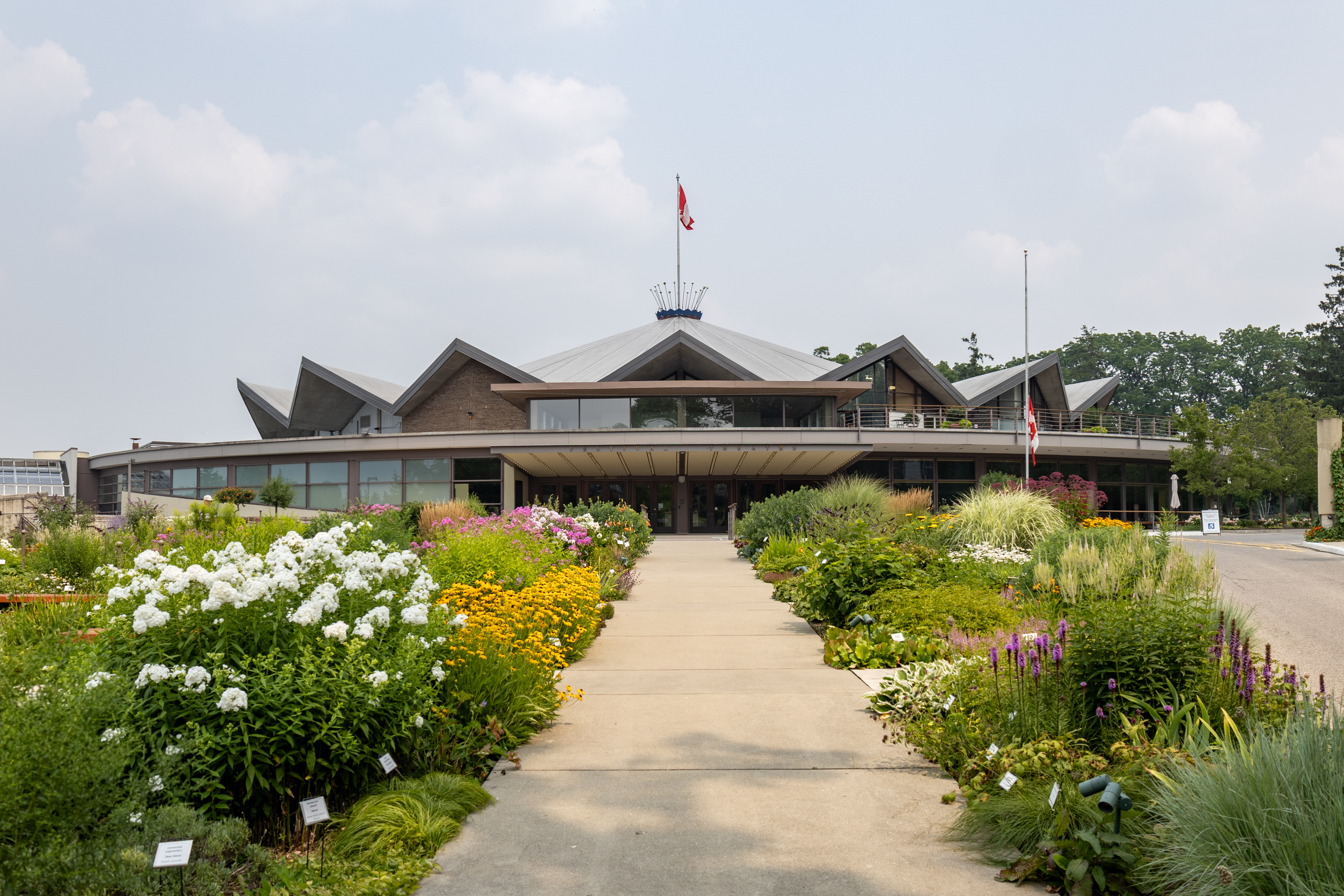
Stratford Festival Theatre in 2025

In October 2025, Church was announced as the new artistic director of the Stratford Festival, the largest repertory theatre company in North America. He will succeed Antoni Cimolino, who has held the position since 2013. Church has stated that he will step back from his role at JCTP before he arrives in Stratford in November 2026.

== Other appointments ==
Apart from his work as a director and producer, Church has held numerous leadership and advisory positions within the arts sector as well as contributing to education and national arts strategies. Since 2017, he has been the chair of the Marlowe Trust. As of 2025, he serves as a board member for the Almeida Theatre, and he previously worked as a visiting professor at Canterbury Christ Church University.

== Awards and honours ==
Over his career, Church has received numerous nominations and wins across theatre and architectural awards, both for his work as a director and producer and for his leadership in theatre redevelopment.

Under his leadership at Chichester Festival Theatre, productions that transferred to the West End earned 13 Laurence Olivier Award nominations for the theatre's 50th anniversary season, in 2012. CFT's £22 million redevelopment (completed in 2014) received wide architectural recognition, picking up five RIBA South East Regional Awards in 2015.

OBE ribbon

In June 2015, Church was appointed a Commander of the Order of the British Empire in the Queen's Birthday Honours, in recognition of his "services to the Theatre".

In 2019, Church received an honorary doctorate from Nottingham Trent University.

== Personal life ==
Church is the son of Tony Church, former broadcaster with BBC Radio Nottingham and previously chief technician at Nottingham Playhouse, and actress Marielaine Douglas.

He is married to Yvonne Thomson, CEO and founder of UKHarvest, and together they have four daughters.
