= Stratford Festival =

Theatre festival in Ontario, Canada

Coordinates: 43.374336°N 80.968468°W

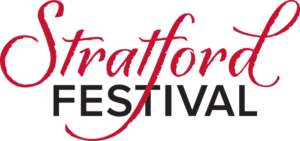
- Genre: Repertory Theatre Festival
- Dates: April to November
- Venue: Festival Theatre; Avon Theatre; Tom Patterson Theatre; Studio Theatre
- Location: Stratford, Ontario
- Founded: October 31, 1952; 74 years ago
- Filing status: Nonprofit
- Website: stratfordfestival.ca

The Stratford Festival is a repertory theatre organization that operates from April to November in the city of Stratford, Ontario, Canada. Founded by local journalist Tom Patterson in 1952, the festival was formerly known as the Stratford Shakespearean Festival, the Shakespeare Festival and the Stratford Shakespeare Festival. The festival was one of the first arts festivals in Canada and continues to be one of its most prominent. It is recognized worldwide for its productions of Shakespearean plays.

The festival's primary focus is to present productions of William Shakespeare's plays, but it has a range of theatre productions from Greek tragedy to Broadway musicals and contemporary works. In the early years of the festival, Shakespeare's works typically represented approximately one third of the offerings in the largest venue, the Festival Theatre. More recently, however, the festival's focus has shifted to encompass works by a more diverse range of playwrights.

The success of the festival changed Stratford into a city where arts and tourism play important roles in the economy. The festival attracts many tourists from outside Canada, most notably British and American visitors.

== History ==
The Festival was founded as the Stratford Shakespearean Festival of Canada, by Tom Patterson, a Stratford-native journalist who wanted to revitalize his town's economy by creating a theatre festival dedicated to the works of William Shakespeare, as the town shares the name of Shakespeare's birthplace, Stratford-upon-Avon, England. Stratford was a railway junction and major locomotive shop, and was facing a disastrous loss of employment with the imminent elimination of steam power. Patterson achieved his goal after gaining encouragement from Mayor David Simpson and the local council, and the Stratford Shakespearean Festival became a legal entity on October 31, 1952.

Already established in Canadian theatre, Dora Mavor Moore helped put Patterson in touch with British actor and director Tyrone Guthrie, first with a transatlantic telephone call. On July 13, 1953, actor Alec Guinness spoke the first lines of the first play produced by the festival, a production of Richard III: "Now is the winter of our discontent / Made glorious summer by this son of York." Guinness and Irene Worth were among the cast of Stratford's inaugural performance of Richard III, working for expenses only.

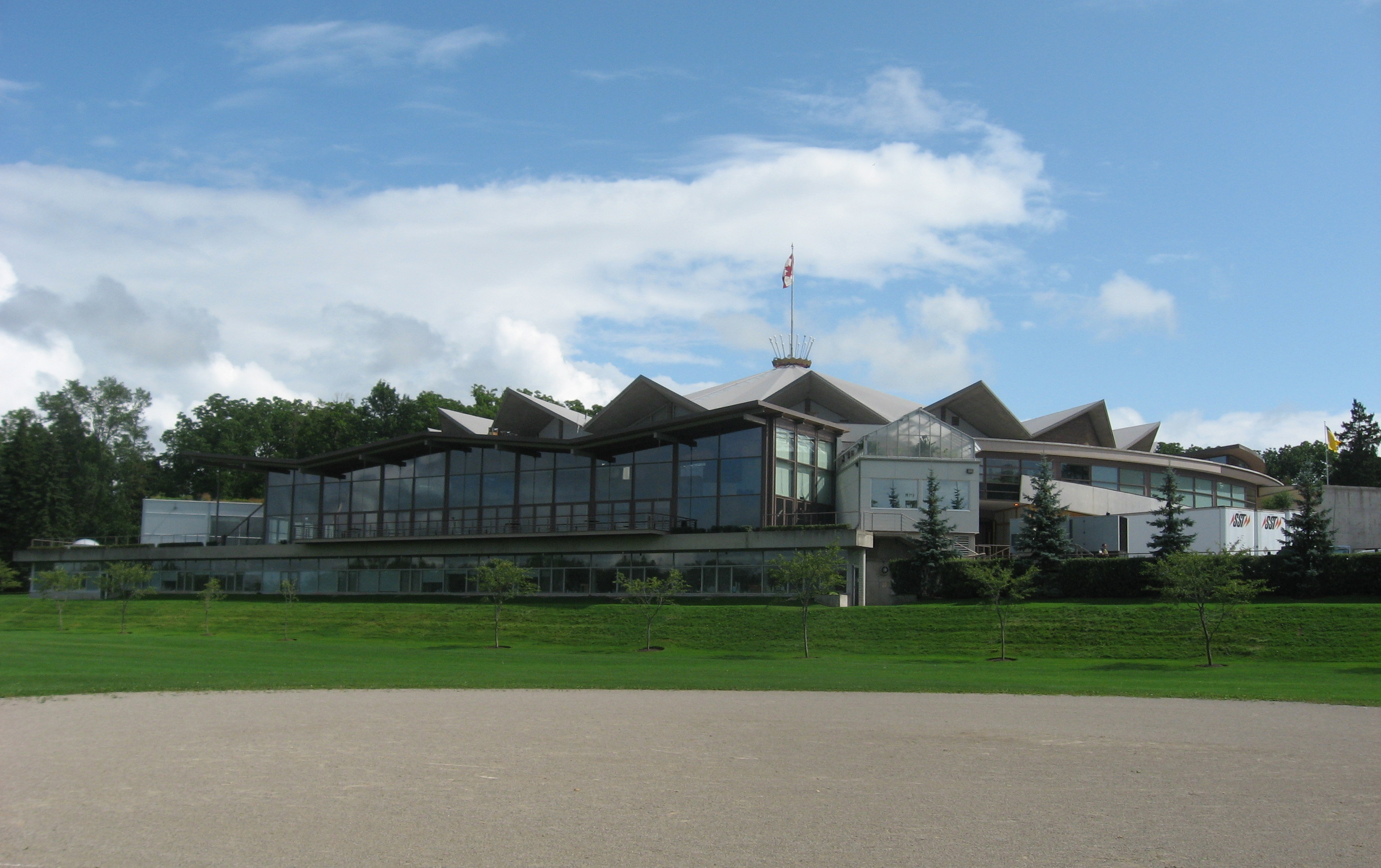
A view of the Festival Theatre as seen from the Avon River.

This first performances (like the entire first four seasons) took place in a concrete amphitheatre covered by giant canvas tent on the banks of the River Avon. The first of many years of Stratford Shakespeare Festival production history started with a six-week season opening on July 13, 1953, with Richard III and then All's Well That Ends Well, both starring Alec Guinness. The 1954 season ran for nine weeks and included Sophocles’ Oedipus Rex and two Shakespeare plays, Measure for Measure and The Taming of the Shrew. Young actors during the first four seasons included several who went on to great success in subsequent years, Douglas Campbell, Timothy Findley, Don Harron, William Hutt and Douglas Rain.

In 1954, the Festival organized the Canadian Players, a company to produce touring productions each summer to provide off-season work for Stratford actors. Canadian Players would exist until 1966, when it folded due to accumulated debt.

Fundraising to build a permanent theatre was slow but was helped significantly by donations from Governor General Vincent Massey and the Perth Mutual Insurance Company. The new Festival Theatre was dedicated on June 30, 1957, with seating for over 1,800 people; no seats are more than 65 feet from the stage. The design was deliberately intended to resemble a huge tent. That season's productions included Hamlet, Twelfth Night, the satirical My Fur Lady, The Turn of the Screw and Ibsen's Peer Gynt.

The Festival Theatre's thrust stage was designed by British designer Tanya Moiseiwitsch to resemble both a classic Greek amphitheatre and Shakespeare's Globe Theatre. It has since become a model for other stages in North America and Great Britain.

Tony Award-nominee Scott Wentworth has performed in the festival's stage productions on numerous occasions since 1985, beginning with The Glass Menagerie; the festival has helped Sara Topham launch her career in acting, performing from 2000 to 2011; and a young, unknown Christopher Walken appeared in Stratford's 1968 stage productions of Romeo and Juliet and A Midsummer Night's Dream, portraying Romeo and Lysander respectively.

Long-serving Artistic Director Richard Monette retired in 2007 after holding the position for fourteen seasons. He was replaced with an artistic team consisting of General Director Antoni Cimolino and Artistic Directors Marti Maraden, Des McAnuff, and Don Shipley. On March 12, 2008, it was announced that Shipley and Maraden would be stepping down, leaving Des McAnuff as sole Artistic Director. In 2013, Des McAnuff was replaced by Antoni Cimolino as Artistic Director.

In 2012, the Festival had a deficit of CA$3.4 million, but by 2015 had a surplus of CA$3.1 million under the control of Cimolino and executive director Anita Gaffney. The target of a half million ticket sales for the season (a previous record) had not yet been reached, but had achieved a significant increase in the number of new patrons to the theatres.

On February 17, 2015, AP News reported that the Stratford Shakespeare Festival plans to film all of Shakespeare's plays.

Actors who have participated in the festival include Alan Bates, Brian Bedford, Domini Blythe, Barbara Bryne, Martha Burns, Jackie Burroughs, Zoe Caldwell, Douglas Campbell, Len Cariou, Brent Carver, Patricia Conolly, Susan Coyne, Jack Creley, Jonathan Crombie, Hume Cronyn, Henry Czerny, Cynthia Dale, Brian Dennehy, Colm Feore, Megan Follows, Maureen Forrester, Lorne Greene, Dawn Greenhalgh, Paul Gross, Alec Guinness, Uta Hagen, Julie Harris, Don Harron, Martha Henry, William Hutt, Frances Hyland, Charmion King, Betty Leighton, Andrea Martin, Barbara March, James Mason, Roberta Maxwell, Eric McCormack, Seana McKenna, Loreena McKennitt, Richard Monette, John Neville, Stephen Ouimette, Lucy Peacock, Nicholas Pennell, David J. Phillips, Amanda Plummer, Christopher Plummer, Sarah Polley, Douglas Rain, Kate Reid, Jason Robards, Alan Scarfe, Paul Scofield, Goldie Semple, William Shatner, Maggie Smith, Jessica Tandy, Peter Ustinov, Christopher Walken, Al Waxman, Irene Worth, Geraint Wyn Davies and Janet Wright.

Female directors at Stratford have included Pam Brighton, Zoe Caldwell, Marigold Charlseworth, Donna Feore, Jill Keiley, Pamela Hawthorne, Martha Henry, Jeannette Lambermont, Diana Leblanc, Marti Maraden, Weyni Mengesha, Carey Perloff, Lorraine Pintal, Vanessa Porteous, Susan H. Schulman, Djanet Sears, Kathryn Shaw, and Jennifer Tarver.

From 1956 to 1961 and 1971 to 1976, the Stratford Festival also staged the separate Stratford Film Festival, which was credited as one of the first North American film festivals ever to schedule international films. That festival collapsed after the 1976 launch of the Festival of Festivals, now known as the Toronto International Film Festival, impacted both the Stratford Film Festival's funding and its audience.

In 2011, the visual artist, Chris Klein, started producing a series of paintings depicting the costumes from festival costume warehouse, having served as their Head of Scenic Art from 2007 to 2015.

In March 2020, as preparations for the upcoming season were underway, the Festival was forced to announce performance cancellations and layoffs due to the COVID-19 pandemic. A month later, the entire 2020 season was put on hold and effectively cancelled. Just before the season's cancellation, Cimolino announced that all productions that had been filmed as part of the Stratford Festival On Film series would be streamed online for free, with a different production being shown each week. Throughout the summer of 2020, the Festival produced four web series which, along with all the filmed productions and other Stratford documentaries and interviews, were launched in October 2020 on the new Stratfest@Home web streaming service.

In April 2021, the Festival announced a season of plays and cabarets, with most productions being held under large canopies at the Festival and Tom Patterson Theatres. Only one late-opening production was held indoors at the Studio Theatre with reduced capacity. The theme for the 2021 season was metamorphosis.

In May 2022, the Festival officially opened the rebuilt Tom Patterson Theatre. Designed by Toronto-based architect, Siamak Hariri, the building overlooks the Avon river and sits on the site of the previous Tom Patterson space. The project cost an estimated CA$100 million and was funded by private donations with support from both provincial and federal governments.

== Today ==
The Festival traditionally runs from April to November, and has four permanent venues: the Festival Theatre, the Avon Theatre, the Tom Patterson Theatre, and the Studio Theatre. Although the Festival's primary mandate is to produce the works of Shakespeare, its season playbills include contemporary works and at least one musical, as well as the classic repertory. The Stratford Festival Forum runs during the season, and features music concerts, readings from major authors, lectures, and discussions with actors or management.

The Stratford Festival is an industry partner of the University of Waterloo Stratford Campus.

== Directors ==
=== Artistic Directors ===
- Tyrone Guthrie (1953–1955)
- Michael Langham (1956–1967)
- Jean Gascon (1968–1974)
- Robin Phillips (1975–1980)
- John Hirsch (1981–1985)
- John Neville (1985–1989)
- David William (1990–1993)
- Richard Monette (1994–2007)
- Marti Maraden, Des McAnuff, Don Shipley (2007–2008)
- Des McAnuff (2008–2012)
- Antoni Cimolino (2013–2026)
- Jonathan Church (2027–) (announced)

=== Executive Directors/General Managers ===
- Victor Polley
- William Wylie
- Bruce Swerdfager—General Manager (1972–1976)
- Gary Thomas
- Mary Hofstetter—General Manager (1995–1997)
- Antoni Cimolino—Executive Director (1998–2006); General Director (2007–2012)
- Anita Gaffney—Executive Director (2013–)

== 2026 season ==
The 2026 season programmed by Artistic Director Antoni Cimolino has the theme of “This Rough Magic”.

- A Midsummer Night’s Dream – by William Shakespeare
- Othello – by William Shakespeare
- The Tempest – by William Shakespeare
- Death of a Salesman – by Arthur Miller
- Guys and Dolls – by Frank Loesser, Jo Swerling & Abe Burrows
- Something Rotten! – Book by Karey Kirkpatrick & John O'Farrell, Music & lyrics by Karey Kirkpatrick & Wayne Kirkpatrick
- Saturday, Sunday, Monday – by Eduardo De Filippo
- The Hobbit – adapted by Kim Selody from J.R.R. Tolkien
- The Importance of Being Earnest – by Oscar Wilde
- Waiting for Godot – by Samuel Beckett
- The King James Bible Play – by Charlotte Corbeil-Coleman
- The Tao of the World – by Jovanni Sy

== 2027 season (announced) ==
The 2027 season is the first programmed by incoming Artistic Director Jonathan Church, coinciding with the festival's 75th anniversary. Running from April 28 to November 28, 2027, the season also introduces updated standard performance times of 1:30 p.m. for matinees and 7:30 p.m. for evening shows.

- Mary Poppins – Book by Julian Fellowes, Music & lyrics by Richard M. Sherman, Robert B. Sherman, George Stiles & Anthony Drewe
- Chicago – Book by Fred Ebb & Bob Fosse, Music by John Kander, Lyrics by Fred Ebb
- Hamlet – by William Shakespeare
- The Taming of the Shrew – by William Shakespeare
- Wolf Hall Parts One & Two – adapted by Mike Poulton from Hilary Mantel
- Jacob Two-Two Meets the Hooded Fang – Book & lyrics by David S. Craig, Music & lyrics by Anika Johnson & Britta Johnson, from Mordecai Richler
- Present Laughter – by Noël Coward
- Almighty Voice and His Wife – by Daniel David Moses
- Anne of Green Gables – adapted by Kat Sandler from L.M. Montgomery

== See also ==
- Theatre in Canada
- List of theatre festivals
- Mary Jolliffe, the festival's first publicist
- James Alexander Cowan, one of the founders of the festival
- The Stratford Adventure, a 1954 National Film Board documentary on the founding of the festival, with Tyrone Guthrie and Alec Guinness
- Slings and Arrows, a 2003–2006 Canadian television comedy set in a fictional Shakespearean company modelled after Stratford
