= Anita Gaffney =

Canadian arts executive

- Born: Stratford, Ontario, Canada
- Citizenship: Canada
- Education: University of Western Ontario (BA); Ivey Business School (MBA)
- Occupation: Arts administrator
- Years active: 1991–present
- Employer: Stratford Festival
- Known for: Executive Director of the Stratford Festival
- Title: Executive Director

Anita Gaffney is a Canadian arts executive who has served as the executive director of the Stratford Festival in Stratford, Ontario since 2013.

== Early life and education ==
Gaffney was born and raised in Stratford, Ontario. Her father, Oliver Gaffney, owned the construction company that built the Stratford Festival's original theatre in 1953.

Gaffney attended the University of Western Ontario (now Western University), where she earned a Bachelor of Arts in English Language and Literature in 1990. She later completed a Master of Business Administration at the Richard Ivey School of Business in 2002 and participated in executive education programs at Harvard Business School.

== Career ==
Gaffney began her career at the Stratford Festival in 1991 as a publicity assistant. She progressed through administrative roles and later served as director of marketing, where she implemented a customer relationship management system to manage the patron base. As administrative director, she oversaw government relations and finance and led a coalition of cultural institutions that lobbied the Ontario government to establish a C$27 million Arts Investment Fund during the late-2000s economic downturn.

In November 2012, Gaffney was appointed executive director, working alongside Artistic Director Antoni Cimolino. She is responsible for the festival's administrative, operational, and strategic leadership. During her tenure, she eliminated a $3.4 million operating deficit and achieved consistent operating surpluses. Since her appointment in 2012, the festival has been transformed with the introduction of new initiatives like The Meighen Forum, The Laboratory, the HD film series, the Stratford Direct bus service and Stratfest@Home, the festival's streaming platform. Together with Cimolino, she led the project to redevelop the Tom Patterson Theatre and the accompanying $100 million capital campaign. The new Tom Patterson Theatre, which was completed in 2020, has attracted a number of awards.

Beyond theatre management, Gaffney has held leadership roles in regional economic and social development. She served as chair of InvestStratford, the city's economic development corporation, and as chair of the Stratford Public Library Board. In 2011, she was campaign chair for the United Way of Perth-Huron, leading a campaign that raised $1.2 million for local social services. At the provincial level, she serves on the board of Destination Ontario and has worked with the Professional Association of Canadian Theatres (PACT).

== Awards and recognition ==
Gaffney has received several awards for her work in arts management. In 2018, the Women's Executive Network named her one of Canada's Most Powerful Women in the Arts, Sports and Entertainment category. In 2019, Western University awarded her an honorary Doctor of Laws degree. Her earlier recognitions include Stratford Woman of the Year in Arts (2010), participation in the 2008 Governor General's Leadership Conference, and a Business Excellence Award from the Stratford District Chamber of Commerce in 2006.
