= Tom Patterson Theatre =

Live theatre building in Stratford, Ontario, Canada

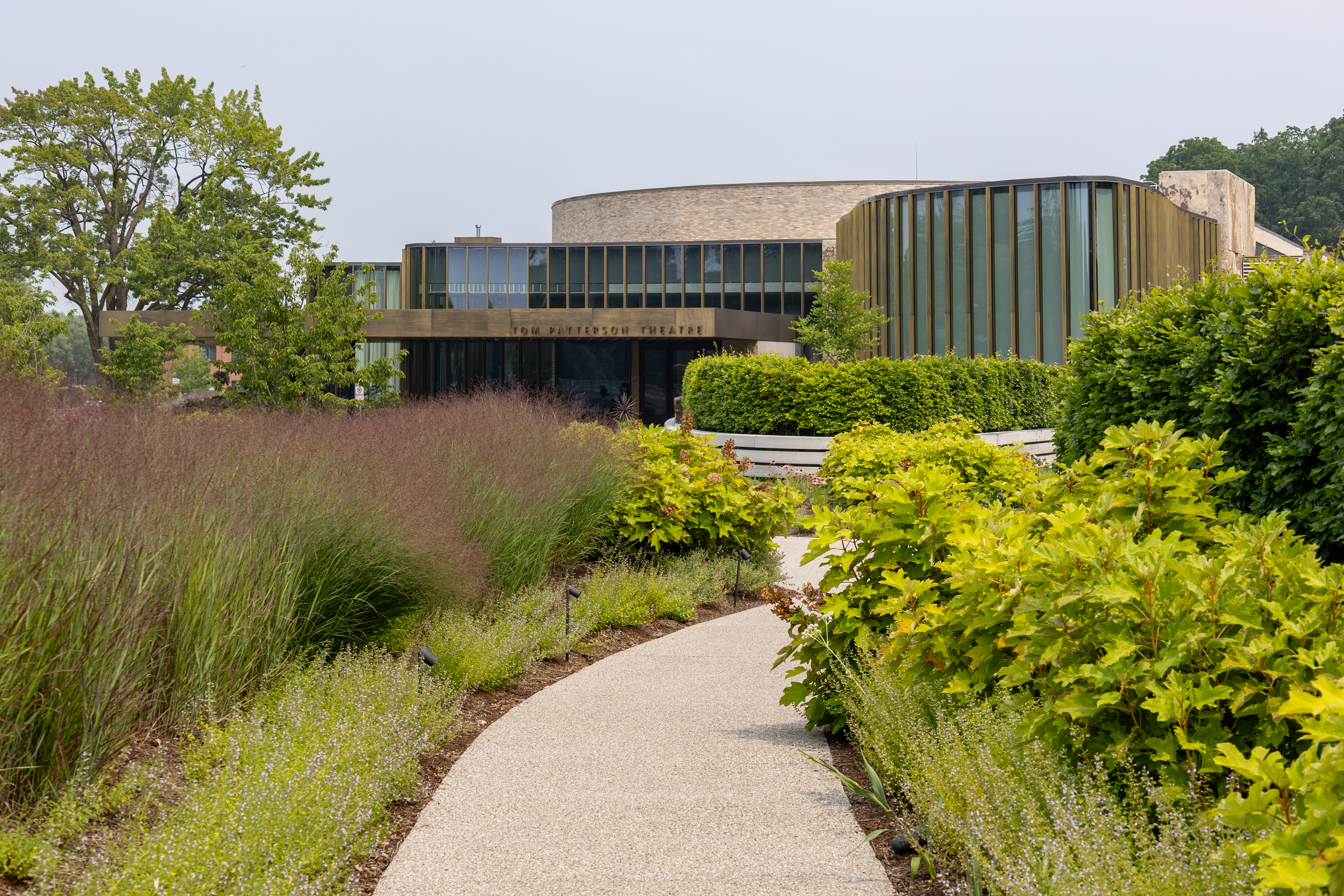
- Tom Patterson Theatre
- Interactive map of the Tom Patterson Theatre area

General information
- Location: Stratford, Ontario, 111 Lakeside Dr, Stratford, ON, Canada
- Coordinates: 43.3735°N 80.9778°W
- Completed: 2022

Technical details
- Floor count: 1
- Floor area: 7150 sq.m.

Design and construction
- Architecture firm: Hariri Pontarini Architects

The Tom Patterson Theatre is a theatre located along the Avon River in Stratford, Ontario, Canada. Construction of the theatre, which began in 2018, was later delayed due to the COVID-19 pandemic. In 2022 it opened and joined the lineup of Stratford Festival theatres.

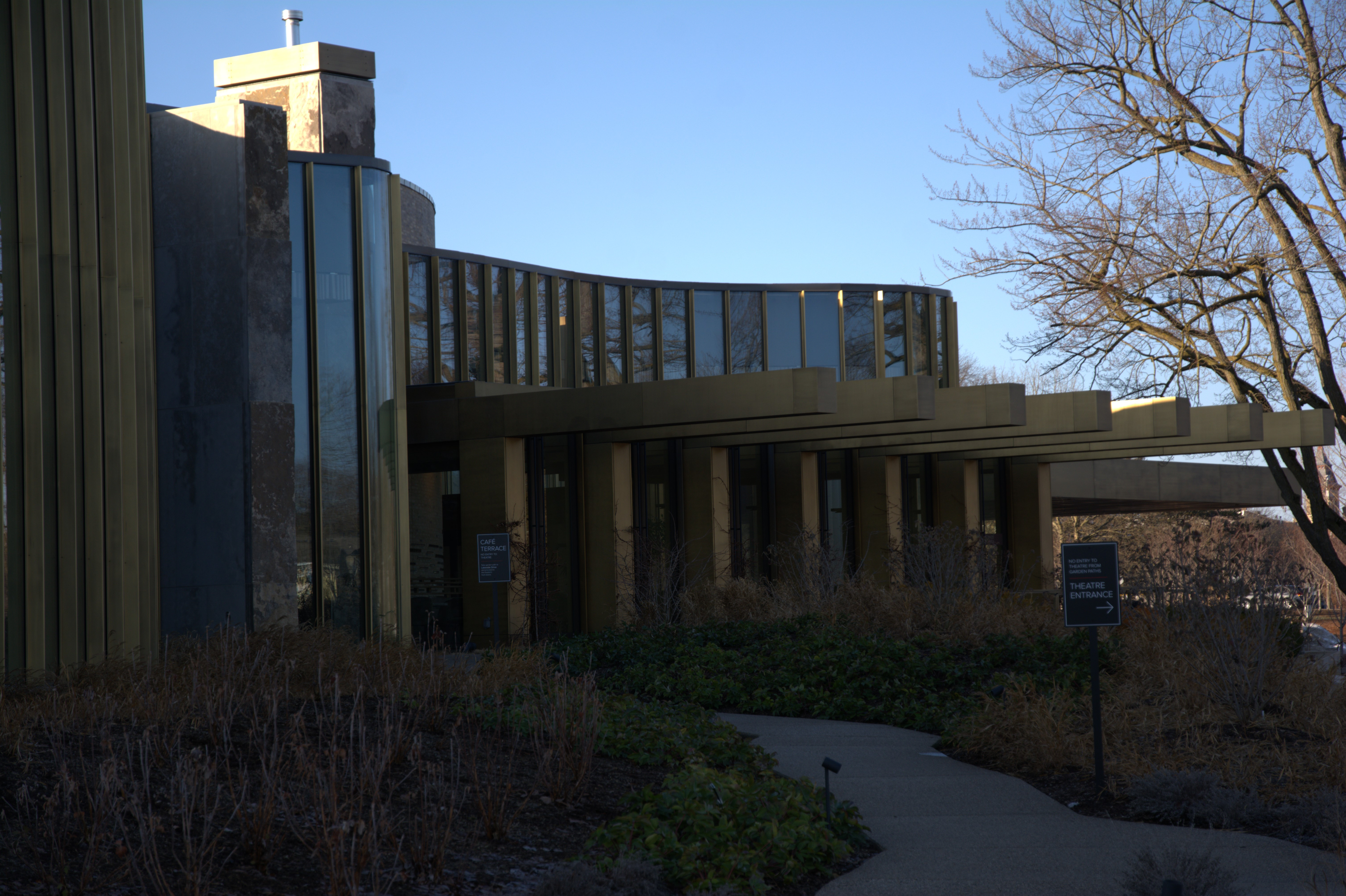
Cafe Terrance, and Ophelia Lazaridis Garden

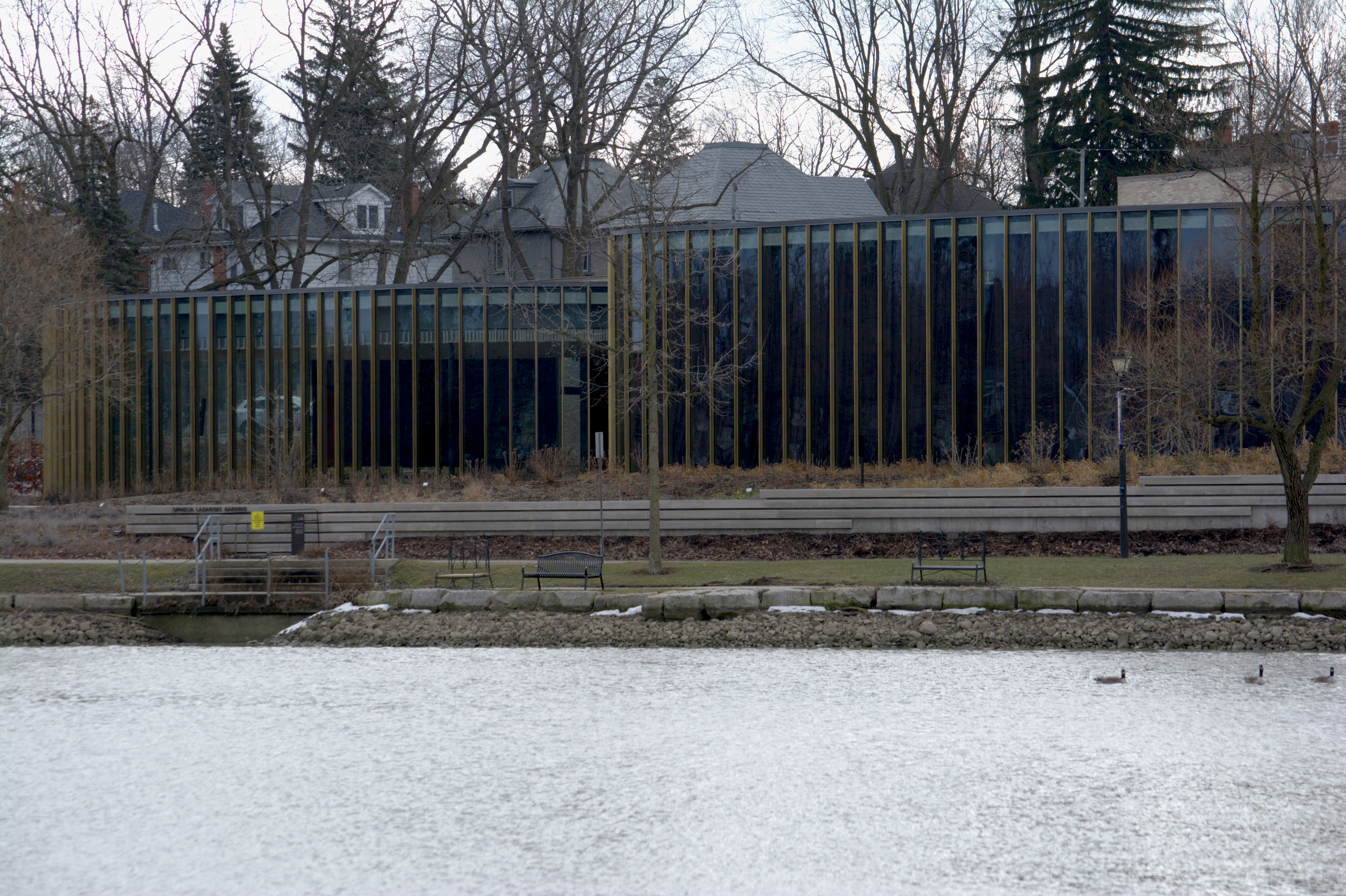
Curtain Glass Windows facing Avon River

== History ==
The theatre is named for Tom Patterson, a trade journalist who initiated the festival. After returning from World War II, Patterson wanted to bring Shakespeare to Stratford. Stratford was a struggling town that had a dwindling railroad industry.

In 1952, Patterson contacted the British director Tyrone Guthrie and also reached out to Tanya Moiseiwitsch for theatre design. These three started the first season in 1953; the festival did not have a building yet and therefore performed in a tent. The company operated three outdoor seasons before renting the Avon Theatre in 1956 and constructing their first theatre in 1957, named the Festival Theatre. In 1971, the Stratford Festival would begin leasing a local Kiwanis centre, which would later be demolished in order to build the current theatre.

Since opening in 2022, Tom Patterson Theatre is a part of the yearly festival which showcases Shakespeare plays and other theatre productions. It also has a secondary performance hall. The festival provides educational experiences for both students and teachers which includes workshops, meet and greets, and camps.

== Construction ==
Originally the Kiwanis Community Centre at 111 Lakeside Drive, the land was declared as surplus by Stratford city council in 2018. In addition to using the space since 1971, the choice of this location for theatrical performances is considered a rock in a metaphorical stream, which is reflected in the architecture of the structure. Originally there was a curling rink on this site; however, the community felt it did not serve the needs of the community.

Hariri Pontarini Architects are the designers of the new theatre. Partner Siamak Hariri was point person on this project.

Construction on the theatre began in 2018, was stalled in 2020 due to COVID restrictions, and was finally finished in 2022. The final cost of the building was around CA$72 million.

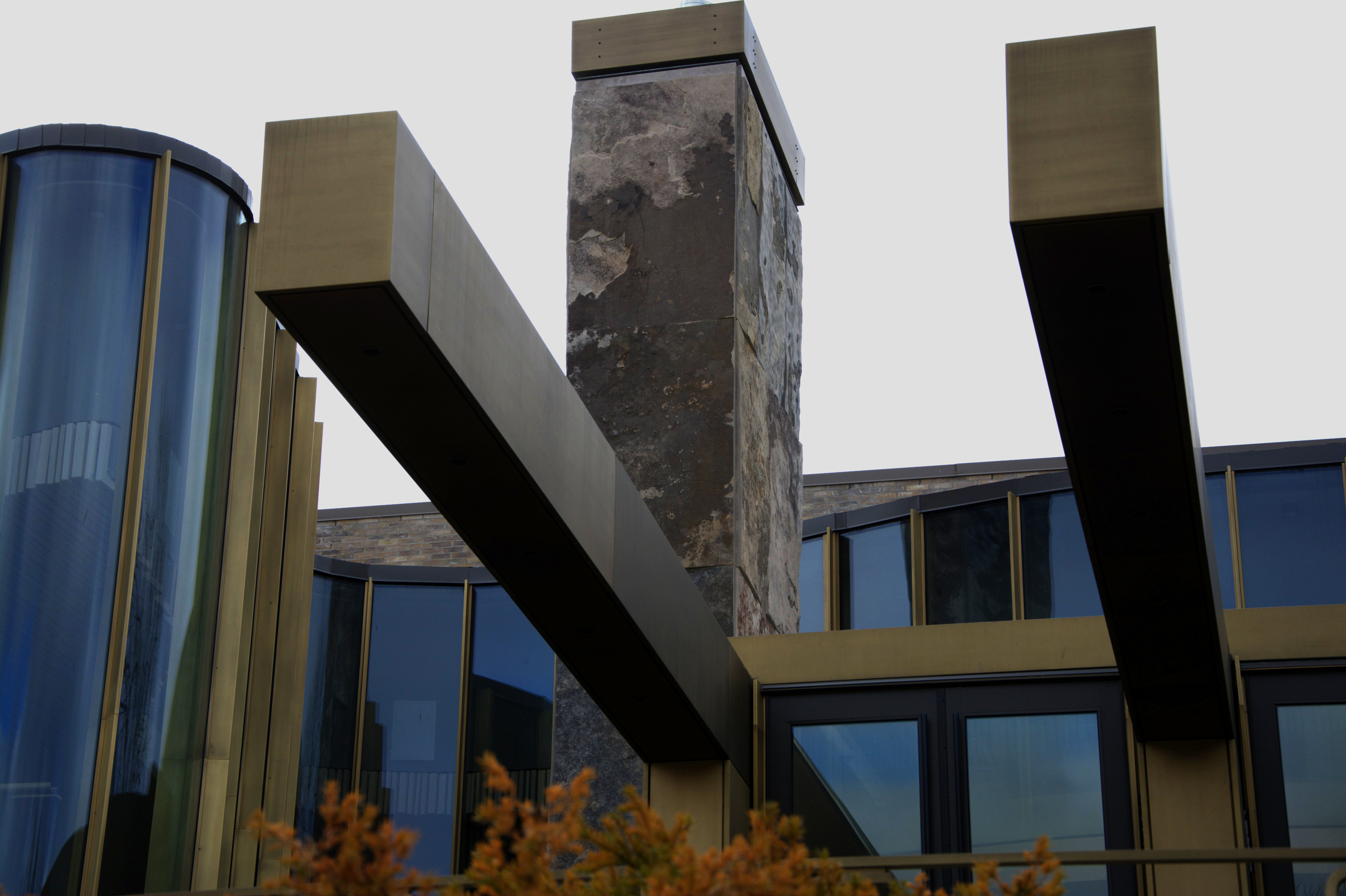
Structural Detail

The structural system includes reinforced concrete below grade and a steel frame above. There are continuous perimeter steel outriggers to frame out the curves of the building. The perimeter framing is supported by exposed custom steel plate columns. The front entrance canopy consists of a large double cantilever supported by one exterior cruciform column. The Theatre walls are made of concrete to ensure acoustic isolation from the remaining gathering space. There are twenty-four-meter-span Vierendeel trusses that support the roof and hanging catwalks above the performance space.

Built using all sustainable and natural materials, the interior of the building and theatre places include oak floors and ceilings. The stage was custom made from Canadian birch, whereas the wall cladding was made of oak in order to give the dark colour required in theatre spaces. However, the primary theatre has walnut finishes because it was designed to ensure the openings would not degrade the acoustic performance of the space.

== Exterior of the building ==
The landscaping was designed by Hariri Pontarini Architects with Holbrook & Associates and The Planning Partnership.

=== Ophelia Lazaridis Garden ===
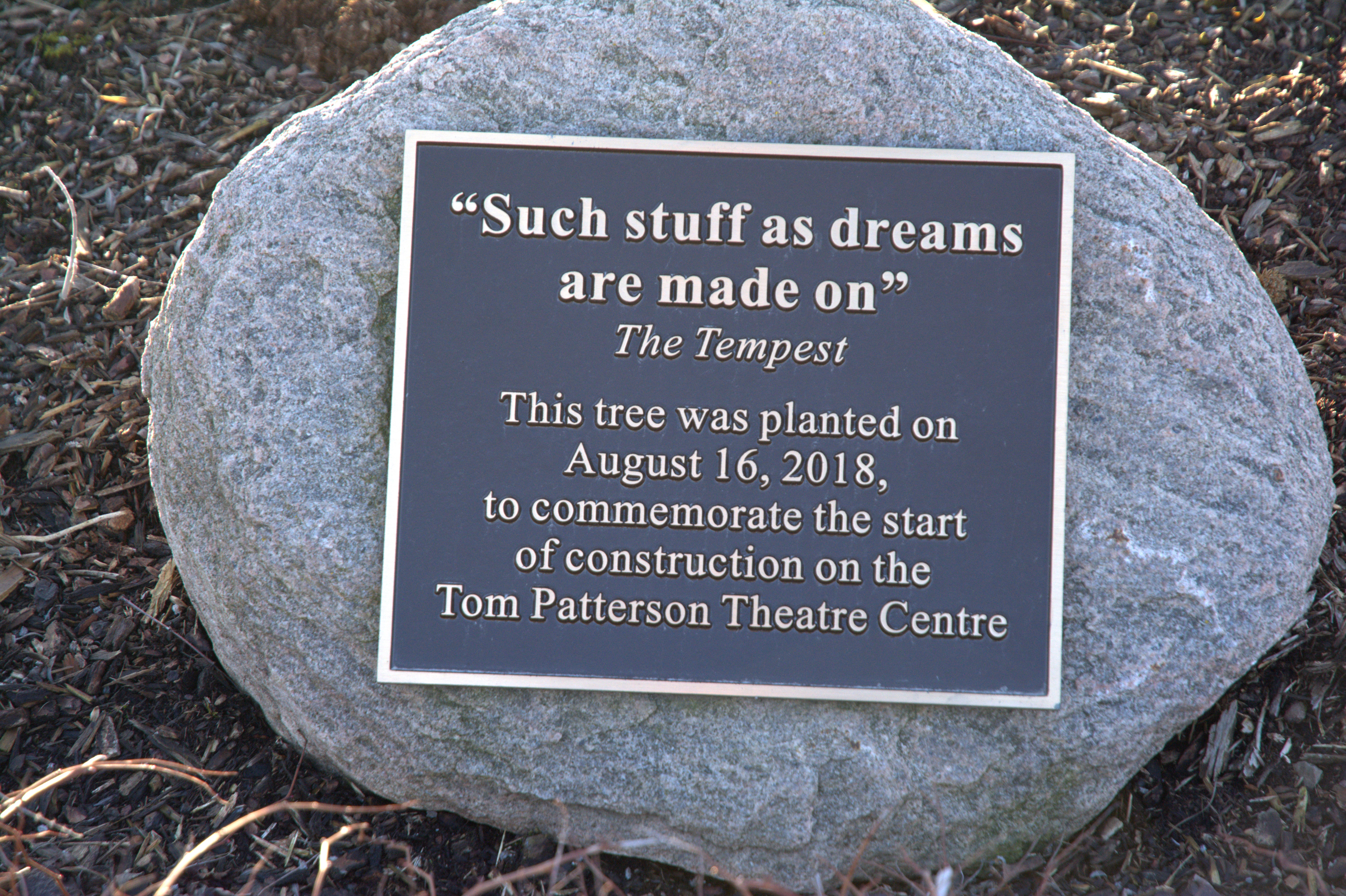
Stone in Ophelia Lazaridis Garden

The Ophelia Lazaridis Garden includes a walking path surrounded by drought-resistant and native plants. These include:

- Amsonia hubrichtii - Narrowleaf Bluestar
- Anemone hupehensis - 'September Charm' Japanese Anemone
- Baptisia australis x alba- 'Purple Smoke' False Indigo
- Calamintha nepeta sub.sp. Nepeta - Calamint
- Echinacea purpurea - 'Magnus' Purple Coneflower
- Eryngium yuccafolium - Rattlesnake Master
- Eupatorium maculatum - Joe-Pye Weed
- Helleborus x weicsmithii - 'Ivory Prince'
- Liatrus spicata - Gayfeather
- Nepeta faassenii - 'Walker's Low' Catmint
- Salvia yangii - 'Little Spire' Russian Sage

== Select awards ==
- Chicago Athenaeum International Architecture Award, 2023
- Governor General's Medals in Architecture - 2022 Recipient
- Civic Trust Award, 2022
- Architecture MasterPrize – Cultural Architecture, 2022
- Ontario Association of Architects (OAA) Design Excellence Award, 2022
- Ontario Association of Architects (OAA) People's Choice Award, 2022
- The PLAN Award – Finalist, Cultural Architecture, 2022
- Architecture MasterPrize - Best of the Best Award, Cultural Architecture, 2021
- LEED gold standard
