= Hooded Fang =

Hooded Fang may refer to:

- Hooded Fang (band), an indie rock music group from Toronto
- Jacob Two Two Meets the Hooded Fang, the films based on the book Jacob Two-Two written by Mordecai Richler
