= Marti Maraden =

Canadian actor and director (1945–2023)

- Maraden on stage (1979)
- Born: Marti Kathleen Fredrickson; June 22, 1945; El Centro, California, U.S.
- Died: August 31, 2023 (aged 78); Uppsala, Sweden
- Years active: 1970s–2023
- Spouse: Frank Maraden

Marti Kathleen Maraden (née Frederickson; June 22, 1945 – August 31, 2023) was a Canadian actor and director. Born in El Centro, California, she immigrated to Canada in 1968, and became a leading actor at the Stratford Festival in the 1970s.

Maraden was artistic director of the National Arts Centre English Theatre in Ottawa from 1997 to 2006. While in this position, and arising from her activities in that role, the National Arts Centre co-founded the Magnetic North Theatre Festival.

In 2006 Maraden was appointed to succeed Richard Monette as an artistic director of the Stratford Shakespeare Theatre in Stratford, Ontario. Unlike previous artistic directors at Stratford, Maraden was a member of a three-person artistic team, which included co-directors Des McAnuff and Don Shipley until creative differences forced the three to end their working relationship.

Directed the play Rexy at Neptune Theatre 2015. Maraden died of organ failure following emergency surgery on August 31, 2023, while visiting family in Uppsala, Sweden. She was 78.
