= David Simpson (Canadian politician) =

Canadian politician (1910–1965)

Alfred David Simpson (born March 19, 1910 - September 11, 1965) was a politician in Ontario, Canada. He served as Mayor of Stratford, Ontario when the Stratford Shakespeare Festival was founded in 1952-53 and encouraged Tom Patterson to pursue the idea further.
