= Don Shipley =

Don or Donald Shipley may refer to:

- Don Shipley (stage director), Canadian stage director
- Don Shipley (Navy SEAL), Virginia, SEAL trainer for civilians
