= John Hirsch =

Hungarian-Canadian theatre director

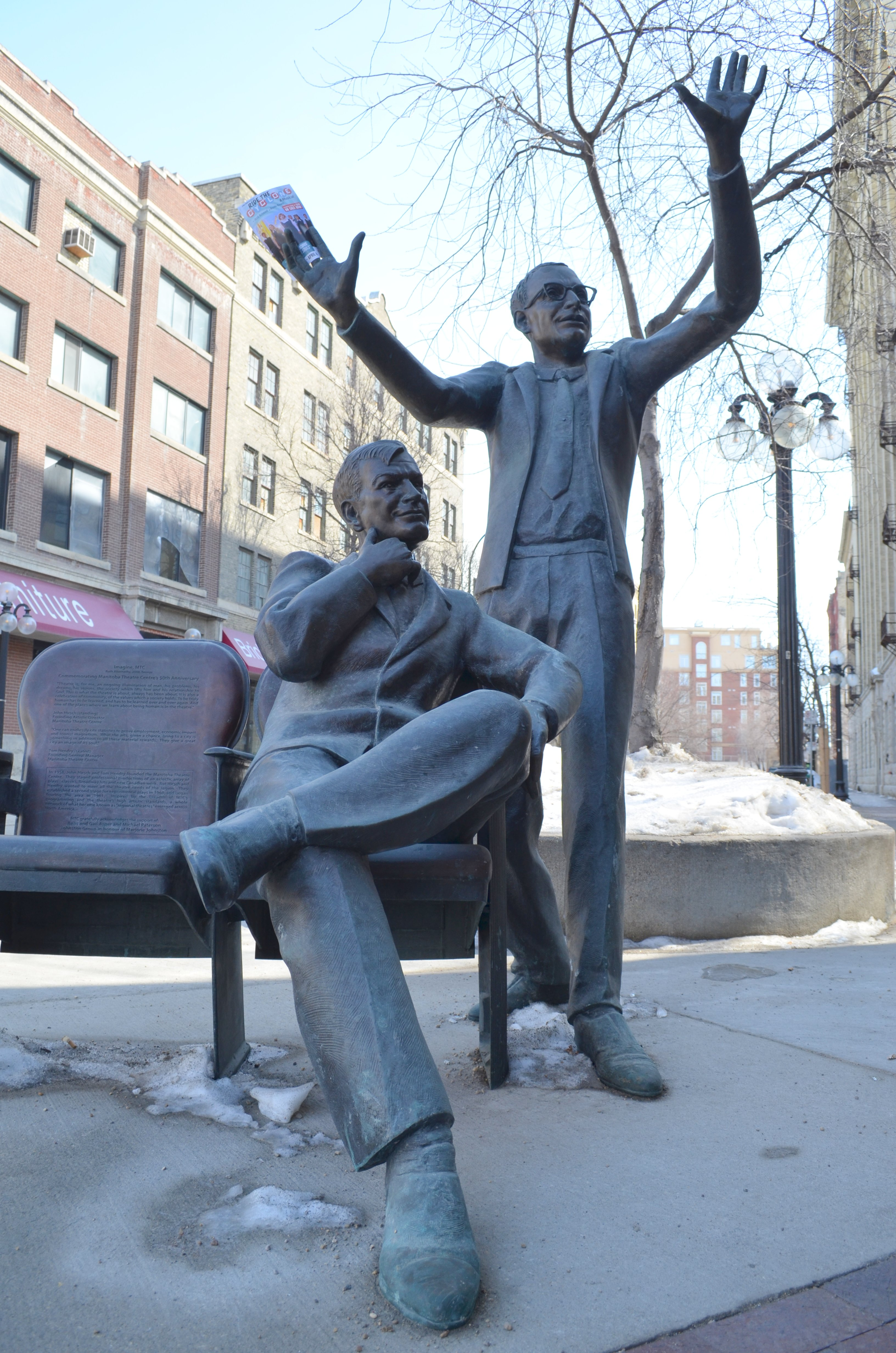
- Bronze statue of John Hirsch (standing) and Tom Hendry (seated) at the Royal MTC.
- Born: May 1, 1930; Siófok, Kingdom of Hungary
- Died: August 1, 1989 (aged 59); Toronto, Ontario, Canada
- Known for: Theater directing, artistic direction, co-founding Theatre 77, musicals, and plays

John Stephen Hirsch, OC (/hɜːrʃ/; May 1, 1930 – August 1, 1989) was a Hungarian-Canadian theatre director. He was born in Siófok, Hungary to József and Ilona Hirsch, both of whom were murdered in the Holocaust along with his younger brother István. Hirsch survived after spending most of the Second World War years in Budapest, and came to Canada in 1947 through the War Orphans Project of the Canadian Jewish Congress. Arriving in Winnipeg, Hirsch was taken into the home of Alex (Sasha) and Pauline Shack. He remained close to the Shacks for the rest of his life, and although he lived in New York City and Toronto, maintained strong ties with the city of Winnipeg.

== Co-founder of Theatre 77 ==
In 1957, Hirsch and Tom Hendry co-founded Theatre 77, which they combined with the Winnipeg Little Theatre in 1958 to form the Manitoba Theatre Centre (MTC) with Hirsch as artistic director and Hendry as manager. MTC became an influential model for regional theatres across Canada and the United States, and is one of Hirsch's most important contributions to Canadian theatre. He directed many plays and musicals at MTC, which he left in 1965.

== Directorial career ==
Over the years, he directed at many Canadian theatres such as Toronto's Crest Theatre, the National Arts Centre, Young People's Theatre, and the Shaw Festival. His 1976 production of Three Sisters at the Stratford Festival, with Maggie Smith, Martha Henry and Marti Maraden in the title roles, won great acclaim.

He was co-artistic director at the Stratford Festival (1967–1969), head of television drama for the CBC (1974–1978), and artistic director at the Stratford Festival (1981–1985). He was also consulting artistic director at the Seattle Repertory Theater (1979–81).

In the United States, Hirsch won the Outer Circle Critics' Award for Saint Joan at Lincoln Center, and an Obie Award for AC/DC at the Chelsea Theater Center in New York. In 1975, he won the Los Angeles Drama Critics Circle Award for The Dybbuk at the Mark Taper Forum in Los Angeles, a play he translated and adapted. He also directed at Israel's Habimah Theatre in 1970.

In 1967, he was made an Officer of the Order of Canada "for his contribution to the performing Arts".

In 1977, he was asked to be the artistic director for the first Canada Day extravaganza on Parliament Hill in Ottawa.

== AIDS-related death ==
Hirsch died of AIDS-related illness after being hospitalized at Mount Sinai Hospital in Toronto, Ontario on August 1, 1989.

== Legacy ==
In 1989, the Manitoba Foundation for the Arts established the John Hirsch Award for Most Promising Manitoba Writer. An endowment from the Hirsch estate provides a cash prize to the most promising Manitoba writer selected by a jury of senior members of the Manitoba writing and publishing community. Some of the past recipients include: David Bergen, Miriam Toews, and Chandra Mayor.

John Hirsch is commemorated by John Hirsch Place, a woonerf in Winnipeg's Exchange District that passes behind the Royal Manitoba Theatre Centre.

== See also ==
- Stratford Festival of Canada
- The Time of Your Life
