= Richard Monette =

Canadian actor and director

- Born: June 19, 1944; Montreal, Quebec, Canada
- Died: September 9, 2008 (aged 64); London, Ontario, Canada
- Education: Loyola College
- Occupations: Actor, administrator
- Years active: 1963–1997

Richard Jean Monette CM, DHum, LLD (June 19, 1944 – September 9, 2008), was a Canadian actor and director, best known for his 14-season tenure as the longest-serving artistic director of the Stratford Festival of Canada from 1994 to 2007.

== Early life and education ==
Monette was born in Montreal, the son of Florence M. (née Tondino) and Maurice Monette. He was educated at Loyola High School (Montreal) and Loyola College (now Concordia University) where he graduated in 1967.

== Career ==
=== Theatre ===
It was at college that his acting skills were first noticed when he took top acting honours at the 1959 Hart House Inter-Varsity Drama competition in Toronto.

Upon graduation, he chose to pursue an acting career, and his first professional role was as a 19-year-old Hamlet at the Crest Theatre in Toronto. He joined the Stratford Festival Company in 1965, and played a variety of small roles. He also won a role in Soldiers at the Royal Alexandra Theatre, a production that took him to Broadway. He also appeared in a number of television plays on CBC.

In 1969, he moved to London, England, and appeared in a variety of productions, including open-air Shakespeare in Regent's Park, and the original London production of the notorious Oh! Calcutta!.

Upon his return to Canada in 1974, he took on the title role in the premiere of the English translation of Michel Tremblay's Hosanna at the Tarragon Theatre. His definitive interpretation of the conflicted transvestite obsessed with Elizabeth Taylor's Cleopatra marked his arrival as one of Canada's leading actors. In his memoir, he recalled it as "a great role, perhaps the best I have ever played, outside of Shakespeare".

He also returned to the Stratford Company, taking on the role of Hamlet, and for the next ten years, he would be one of Stratford's main leading men.

Monette fought a lifelong battle with stage fright, and gradually refocused his energies from acting to directing. Although he had directed a short play at Stratford in 1978, his first full-length Stratford production was Taming of the Shrew at Stratford in 1988, which was an unexpected hit with audiences. Critic Richard Ouzounian believes this production served as a foundation for Monette's career as a director, calling it "a joyous romp in which the Fellinesque setting of Rome in the 1950s meshed marvelously with Shakespeare's text and the performances of Goldie Semple and Colm Feore".

Monette was selected as Artistic Director Designate of Stratford in 1992, and subsequently named artistic director in 1994. During his tenure, he not only staged every one of Shakespeare's plays, he also showcased big-production musicals such as My Fair Lady and Anything Goes. Although critics argued that the musicals were too populist, Monette erased the Festival's considerable financial deficit and brought in new audiences. His other legacies at Stratford include the Birmingham Conservatory acting school, a $50 million endowment fund, and the opening of a fourth theatre, the 260-seat Studio Theatre.

He also continued to take on occasional acting roles.

=== Film and television ===
Monette appeared in a number of Canadian films, including Dancing in the Dark (1986), and I've Heard the Mermaids Singing (1987).

On television, Monette played the Storyteller in several episodes of the BBC children's television series Jackanory (1968). Later appearances included The Littlest Hobo (1981), Street Legal (1988), and the 1985 revival series, The Twilight Zone (1989), among others.

In 1991, Monette played Mr. Norman, a corrupt city official impeding a building project at the direction of a mob boss in "Going Home," a season two episode of Counterstrike starring Christopher Plummer.

His television movie roles include Amadeus Mozart in Titans (1981), Tommy in A Far Cry from Home (1981), Stuart Kessler in Murder by Night (1989), Dr. Lloyd in And Then There was One (1994), and Sal in While My Pretty One Sleeps (1997).

== Personal life and death ==
Monette was the nephew of Canadian painter Gentile Tondino. A little over a year after his retirement, he died of a pulmonary embolism.

== Filmography ==
=== Film ===
- Big Zapper (1973) – Rock Hard
- Find the Lady (1976) – Bruce La Rousse
- Iceman (1984) – Hogan
- Dancing in the Dark (1986) – The doctor
- Mania: The Intruder (1986) – Jack Benson
- I've Heard the Mermaids Singing (1987) – Clive
- Hello Mary Lou: Prom Night II (1987) – Father Cooper
- Higher Education (1988) – Robert Bley

=== Television ===
ACTOR television credits
| Year | Title | Role | Notes | Ref. |
|---|---|---|---|---|
| 1968 | Jackanory | Storyteller | 5 episodes | |
| 1981 | Titans | Amadeus Mozart | 1 episode | |
| 1981 | The Littlest Hobo | Ed Jordan | 1 episode | |
| 1981 | A Far Cry from Home | Tommy | TV movie | |
| 1988 | Street Legal | Brock | Episode: "Mondo Condo" | |
| 1989 | The Twilight Zone | Dr. Wilson | Episode: "Father and Son Game" | |
| 1989 | Murder by Night | Stuart Kessler | TV movie | |
| 1991 | Counterstrike | Mr. Norman | Episode: "Going Home" | |
| 1994 | And Then There was One | Dr. Lloyd | TV movie | |
| 1997 | While My Pretty One Sleeps | Sal | TV movie | |
