= Belfry Theatre =

Theatre and associated theatre company in Victoria, British Columbia

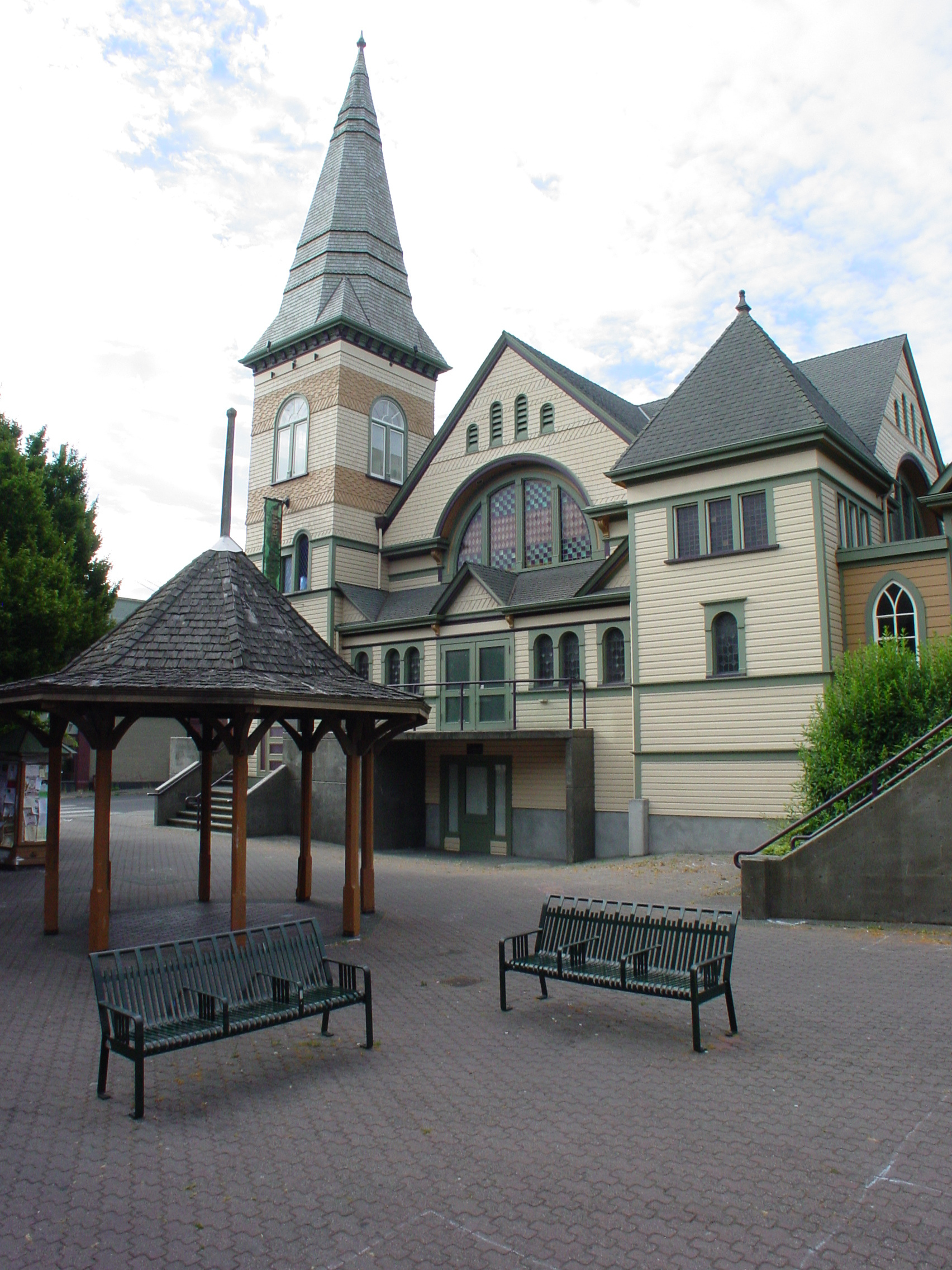
- The Belfry Theatre in Fernwood Square
- Interactive map of Belfry Theatre
- Address: 1291 Gladstone Avenue; Victoria, British Columbia; V8T 1G5
- Coordinates: 48.430119°N 123.345222°W
- Capacity: 279
- Type: Theatre

Construction
- Built: Between 1887 and 1892
- Opened: 1976
- Years active: 1976-present

Website
- www.belfry.bc.ca

The Belfry Theatre is a theatre and associated theatre company in the Fernwood neighbourhood of Victoria, British Columbia, Canada. The company produces contemporary theatre, with a focus on Canadian work. The theatre building is a converted nineteenth-century church designed by Thomas Hooper.

== Mission ==
Michael Shamata, the current artistic director of The Belfry, has said that "it is my hope that all of the plays that we produce open a door to a new world." The emphasis of the Belfry's productions has been on Canadian work, and the development of new work through "commissions, dramaturgy, workshops, readings, and first productions." The Belfry is also noted for its "commitment to Canadian and contemporary plays, and for the loyalty it has inspired from both the local community, which it has transformed, and from first-rank artists across the country."

== Building history ==
From its construction, between 1887 and 1892, until 1974, the building was the Emmanuel Baptist Church of Fernwood.

The church's congregation formed in 1874. They purchased the plot at Fernwood and Gladstone for $550, and dedicated the Spring Ridge Chapel on February 6, 1887. Under supervision of Rev. Peter H. McEwen, construction completed in 1892. The building continued to function as a church for the next 79 years until April 4, 1971, when the congregation moved to a new sanctuary in Saanich.

In 1974, the building saw its first use as a theatre space when University of Victoria graduate student Blair Shakel rented out the church's chapel. In 1975 Don Shipley (stage director) formed the Springridge Cultural Centre, based on the model of Vancouver's East Cultural Centre (The Cultch). He would later be joined by Pat Armstrong as co-director of the Belfry Cultural Centre, which would go on to be The Belfry.

In 1990 the Belfry company purchased the building. It has since undergone two major renovations, the first completed in 2003, and more recently in 2017.

== Production history ==
The first theatre production put on by The Belfry was Don Shipley's Puttin' on the Ritz, in 1977. Since then the Belfry has produced over 312 plays, of which more than 233 were Canadian, and at least 47 were premieres.

Some notable plays that premiered at The Belfry are Dan Needles's Wingfield Farm plays (Wingfield Series), Morris Panych's Vigil, and Michele Riml's plays Sexy Laundry and on the edge.

The Belfry season generally has 4 mainstage plays per year: #1 Sep-Oct, #2 Nov-Dec, #3 Feb-Mar, #4 Apr-May

Belfry Mainstage Plays 2013-2024
DATE	PLAY TITLE
2024-04	The Lehman Trilogy
2024-02	As Above (also 2018-02)
2023-11	I Think I’m Falling: The Songs of Joni Mitchell (also 2016-11)
2023-09	Yaga
2023-04	Old Stock: A Refugee Love Story
2023-02	The Unplugging
2022-11	Vigil
2022-09	Intimate Apparel
2022-04	Sexual Misconduct of the Middle Classes
2022-02	Little Red Warrior and his Lawyer
2021-11	Serving Elizabeth
2021-09	Same Old Same Old (recorded, online playback)
2021-03	Being Here: The Refugee Project (streamed online)
2020-11	A variety of play readings (online)
2020-09	A variety of play readings (online)
2020-04	(no mainstage play due to COVID)
2020-02	The Ministry of Grace
2019-11	Every Brilliant Thing
2019-09	The Children
2019-04	4000 Miles
2019-02	Bears
2018-11	Mustard
2018-09	A Doll’s House
2018-04	Salt Baby
2018-02	As Above (also 2024-02)
2017-11	Onegin
2017-09	The Children’s Republic
2017-04	Alice Munro Stories
2017-02	Grace
2016-11	I Think I’m Falling: The Songs of Joni Mitchell (also 2023-11)
2016-09	The Last Wife
2016-04	Puttin’ on the Ritz
2016-02	The Valley
2015-11	Chelsea Hotel
2015-09	Speed-the-Plow
2015-04	Vans and Sonia and Marsha and Mike
2015-02	The Best Brothers / How to Disappear Completely
2014-11	Venus in Fur
2014-09	The Rez Sisters
2014-04	Equivocation
2014-02	Home is a beautiful World
2013-11	A Tender Thing
2013-09	Good Night Desdemona (Good Morning Juliet)
2013-04	Let Me Call You Sweetheart
2013-02	Speaking in Tongues

== Community engagement ==
In accordance to their mission statement, The Belfry has many programs to increase their engagement with the local community.

Belfry 101 (and later additions of 201 and 301) is an educational program unique to the theatre. It gets high school students directly involved behind the scenes with some Belfry productions, giving them opportunity to develop their own creative abilities and practice thinking critically. The students also receive discounted season tickets.

Additional involvement and community events include a talk back feature called B4Play, post-show talk backs Afterplay and Talkback Thursdays, as well as a variety of online resources, including Heart of the Matter, the Belfry Librarian, and access to digital issues of Upstage their magazine publication.

In their 2008-09 Season the Belfry added SPARK festival, in addition to their mainstage shows. SPARK is an effort to support emerging and unique theatre in Canada, and is part of a festival with workshops and free community events.
