= Antoni Cimolino =

Canadian actor and director

Antoni Cimolino CM is a Canadian actor and director. He is the artistic director of the Stratford Festival in Stratford, Ontario.

After graduating from University of Windsor with a BFA, Cimolino began his career as an actor at Stratford in 1988. He later switched to theatre management and stage direction when Richard Monette was appointed artistic director in 1994, becoming executive director in 1998 and general director in 2007. During the Monette years, Cimolino established funds to provide financial stability for the Festival, and helped secure funding to open the Festival's Studio Theatre in 2002. An accomplished director, Cimolino has staged successful Shakespearean productions in Stratford and Detroit.

Cimolino was selected to become the artistic director at Stratford Festival in 2013, taking over the position from outgoing artistic director, Des McAnuff.

== Personal life ==
He is married to actress Brigit Wilson and has two children, Gabriel and Sophia. In December 2015, Cimolino was appointed as a Member of the Order of Canada for contributions to Canadian theatre and arts leadership.
