= Des McAnuff =

American-Canadian film director

Des McAnuff CM
- Born: Desmond Steven McAnuff; June 19, 1952 (age 74); Princeton, Illinois, U.S.
- Occupations: Film director; theatre director; producer
- Years active: 1978–present
- Spouses: Susan Berman (m. 1984; div. 2009) Bryna McCann (m. 2012)
- Children: 1

Desmond Steven McAnuff CM (born June 19, 1952) is an American-Canadian film director. He is the former artistic director of Canada's Stratford Festival and director of such Broadway musical theatre productions as Big River, The Who's Tommy and Jersey Boys.

== Biography ==
Born in Princeton, Illinois, to John Nelson and Ellen Boyd, McAnuff is a citizen of the United States and Canada. He lived briefly in Guelph, Ontario, attending grade 4 at St. George's Public School. His family then moved to Scarborough, Ontario, at the time a suburb of Toronto, and attended high school at Woburn Collegiate Institute where he made his first theatrical appearance in the school's production of The Sound of Music, playing the role of Kurt. Later, with the help of two friends, he wrote the music and lyrics to a rock musical called Urbania, which was performed by the high school drama club. He attended Ryerson Polytechnical Institute, but never completed his degree. In June 2011, he was awarded an honorary degree by the Ryerson Theatre School.

McAnuff worked with the Toronto Free Theatre as a director, and after several plays that had limited success, he left the Canadian scene for New York City, where he co-founded the Dodger Theatre Company in 1978, where he also directed the first production, entitled Gimme Shelter. He is a former faculty member of the Juilliard School.

McAnuff was artistic director of the La Jolla Playhouse, which he revived in 1983, during which time the theatre won more than 200 awards. For the Playhouse, he directed Romeo and Juliet, A Mad World, My Masters, Big River, As You Like It, The Sea Gull, The Matchmaker, A Walk in the Woods, Two Rooms, 80 Days, Macbeth, A Funny Thing Happened On The Way To The Forum, Twelfth Night, Three Sisters, Elmer Gantry, Much Ado About Nothing, The Who's Tommy and How to Succeed in Business Without Really Trying.

He turned over his leadership of the playhouse in 2005 to Michael Greif in order to take a position of leadership at Canada's Stratford Shakespeare Festival. In 2008, after a year sharing power with Don Shipley and Marti Maraden, McAnuff became the sole artistic director at Stratford.

McAnuff has directed two motion pictures, The Adventures of Rocky and Bullwinkle (2000) and Cousin Bette (1998), both of which failed critically and at the box-office. However, the animated version of The Iron Giant, which he served as producer, earned several awards.

In 2010 McAnuff was the subject of a documentary special entitled Des McAnuff: A Life In Stages which was a part of the broadcast schedule on Bravo! in Canada for February 7, 2010.

During the 2011-12 Season at the Metropolitan Opera he directed a new production of Charles Gounod's Faust starring soprano Marina Poplavskaya and tenor Jonas Kaufmann. On Sunday, October 23, 2011, a tribute for McAnuff was given by staff and students from Ryerson's Theatre School.

== Personal life ==
McAnuff married actress Susan Berman in 1984; the couple has one daughter, Julia McAnuff, who played a young Karen Sympathy in The Adventures of Rocky and Bullwinkle. The couple divorced in 2009. In 2012, McAnuff married Bryna McCann.

== Filmography ==
=== Feature films ===
- Cousin Bette (1998) (director)
- The Iron Giant (1999) (producer)
- The Adventures of Rocky and Bullwinkle (2000) (director)
- Caesar and Cleopatra (2009) (director)
- The Tempest (2010) (director)

=== Stage productions ===
- Big River (1985)
- A Walk in the Woods (1988)
- Dangerous Games (1989)
- The Who's Tommy (1993)
- How to Succeed in Business Without Really Trying (1995)
- Tartuffe (2002)
- Dracula, the Musical (2004)
- 700 Sundays (2004)
- Jersey Boys (2005)
- Romeo and Juliet (2008)
- Caesar and Cleopatra (2008)
- Guys and Dolls (2009)
- Macbeth (2009)
- A Funny Thing Happened on the Way to the Forum (2009)
- As You Like It (2010)
- The Tempest (2010)
- Jesus Christ Superstar (2011)
- Twelfth Night (2011)
- A Word or Two (2012)
- Henry V (2012)
- Yoshimi Battles the Pink Robots (2012)
- The Who's Tommy (2013)
- 700 Sundays (2014)
- Summer: The Donna Summer Musical (2017) (book writer and director)
- Ain't Too Proud (2017)
- The Who's Tommy (2024 Revival)

== Awards and nominations ==
McAnuff has won the Tony Award for Best Direction of a Musical twice: first in 1985 for Big River and again in 1993 for The Who's Tommy. He was nominated in 1993 for Best Book (Musical), with Pete Townshend on The Who's Tommy, and in 1995 as Best Director (Musical) for How to Succeed in Business Without Really Trying. He was nominated again in 2006 for Jersey Boys, based on the story of Frankie Valli and the Four Seasons. Although he did not win, the production won Best Musical that year. In 2019 he received another Tony nomination for Ain't Too Proud.

He was awarded the Laurence Olivier Theatre Award for Best Director of 1996 for The Who's Tommy at the Shaftesbury Theatre. In May 2012, McAnuff received the National Arts Centre Award, a companion award of the Governor General's Performing Arts Awards, Canada's highest honour in the performing arts. He was invested as a Member of the Order of Canada (CM) in 2013.
