= While My Pretty One Sleeps =

1989 fictional novel

- First edition
- Author: Mary Higgins Clark
- Language: English
- Genre: Thriller
- Publisher: Simon & Schuster
- Publication date: 1989
- Publication place: United States
- Media type: Print (hardback & paperback)
- ISBN: 0-671-55665-7 (first edition hardcover)

While My Pretty One Sleeps is a 1989 novel by Mary Higgins Clark. It takes place in New York City. It was number 10 in the Publishers Weekly best selling book list that year. It is listed in the OCLC top 1000 works most widely held by libraries.

== Plot ==
Neeve Kearney runs a dress shop. One of her popular customers, Ethel Lambston, a writer, is found dead in a small cave.

== Inspiration ==
The character of Bishop Stanton is based on Father Joseph A. O'Hare, president of Fordham University.

== In other media ==
While My Pretty One Sleeps was made into a television film directed by Jorge Montesi and starring Connie Sellecca as Neeve Kearny, Simon MacCorkindale as Jack Campbell, Beau Starr as Myles Kearny, and Frank Pellegrino as Gordon Steuber, released 12 January 1997 in the US.
