= Murder by Night =

1989 film directed by Paul Lynch

Murder by Night is a 1989 American made-for-television film directed by Paul Lynch and starring Robert Urich. The film's story is about a man with amnesia who is found at the scene of a murder. The film aired on USA Network.

== Background ==
Alan B. McElroy wrote the script of the film, which was shot in Toronto. An Associated Press article that appeared in the Orlando Sentinelwrote that the film was "part of a package of 24 original motion pictures for USA World Premiere Movie on the cable channel."

== Plot ==
Allan Strong is out jogging one evening when he sees a brutal attack of a woman by a hammer-wielding serial killer. As the woman tries to escape in her car, she crashes into a construction site, and her car explodes. The murder is the third in a series of brutal slayings by the serial killer. The explosion knocks Strong, a wealthy and reclusive restaurant owner, unconscious, and he develops amnesia. As the only witness to the murder, Strong is a person of interest to police investigators. Police psychologist Karen Hicks works with Strong to try to regain his memory, while police detective Lt. Carl Madsen, who is Hicks' ex-husband, disbelieves that Strong is suffering from amnesia. As the movie progresses, Urich starts to wonder if he is the serial killer.

== Cast ==
- Robert Urich as Allan Strong
- Kay Lenz as Karen Hicks
- Michael Ironside as Lt. Carl Madsen
- Jim Metzler as Kevin Carlisle
- Barbara Radecki as Hostess

== Reception ==
The film drew mixed reviews. St. Petersburg Times critic Lucy May gave the film a negative review, criticizing Urich's "flat acting" and "the movie's ridiculous dialogue." Meanwhile, the Los Angeles Times' Ray Loynd was more charitable, criticizing the plot's logic but commending the production values, writing, "if you check out the dialogue carefully, you can pick up on the killer early on. Red herrings hover about, and chess figures as a metaphor. Production values are solid. "Murder by Night" is a suspenser with more craft than logic or originality." Daniel Ruth, writing in the Chicago Sun-Times, gave Murder by Night 2-1/2 stars and noted that the film "does manage to buff and polish the venerable amnesia bit. It's flawed, but this film turns into an enjoyable little mystery." Ruth added that the film "still is an engaging, modest thriller" and that director McElroy "has crafted a nicely stylish show, with just enough twists and turns to sustain interest." Most of all, Ruth wrote, Urich "has tackled a role requiring an exceptionally high degree of vulnerability. As the amnesia-stricken Strong, Urich takes his character from a cold, aloof recluse to a man on the brink of a nervous breakdown as the terrifying thought that he might be a deranged killer begins to overwhelm him. It's a strong, convincing piece of work by Urich, who is ably supported by Lenz as his love interest." And Chicago Tribune television critic Rick Kogan gave the film mixed praise. "One measure of success for a thriller is its ability to provide enough false leads to mask the identity of the culprit," Kogan wrote. "And 'Murder by Night' does this effectively enough that one almost abandons one's Bad Guy theory and accepts that Urich must be the killer." Overall, however, Kogan wrote that he liked several of the acting performances but not the plot. "Urich does a creditable job with a difficult role," Kogan wrote. "Lenz is unusually delightful and capable. Ironside is so believably nasty that one is not at all upset when he gets a couple of nonfatal hammer knocks on the head. Still, with all the twists and turns of the plot, the ending of 'Murder by Night' is relatively unfulfilling - proving, once again, that when the Good Guys win, the viewer sometimes loses."

== Home media ==
The film was released on VHS in 1990. As of 2024, the film has still not been officially released on DVD.
