= Festival Theatre, Stratford =

Theatre in Stratford, Ontario

Coordinates: 43.374308°N 80.968375°W

Festival Theatre
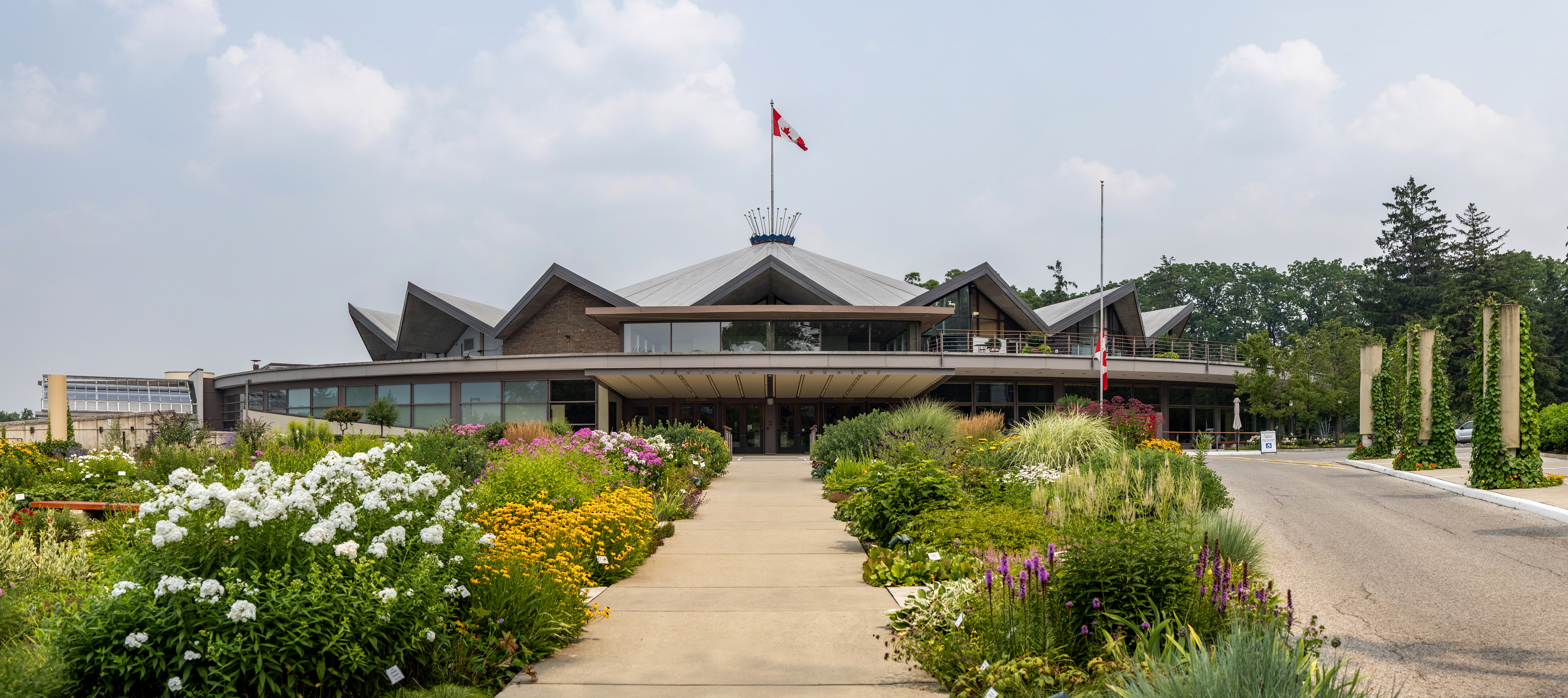

General information
- Location: 55 Queen Street, Stratford, Ontario
- Construction started: 15 April 1953 (tent); 25 August 1956 (permanent)
- Completed: 12 July 1953 (tent); 30 June 1957 (permanent)

Design and construction
- Architecture firm: Rounthwaite & Fairfield

Other information
- Seating capacity: 2,192

Festival Theatre is a performing arts theatre in Stratford, Ontario that is the main venue of the Stratford Festival. The theatre was constructed in the spring of 1953 and was completed in time for the festival's opening on 13 July of that year. The original theatre comprised concrete bleachers covered by a tent and was usable only in the summer. The tent theatre remained in use for four seasons and was taken down in August 1956. That month, construction began on a new permanent building using the existing bleachers. The permanent building opened for the start of the 1957 season. Both the tent theatre and the permanent theatre were designed by architects Rounthwaite & Fairfield of Toronto. Festival Theatre has become a civic symbol of Stratford and serves as the centre of the city's cultural life.

== History and design ==
=== Background ===
In 1951, Stratford-born journalist Tom Patterson thought up the idea for a Shakespearean festival to be held in his hometown. In July of 1952, Patterson invited Tyrone Guthrie to Canada to advise on the project. Sir Tyrone agreed to be part of the project, provided that it employed star performers and experienced personnel. After the meeting, the festival hired Alec Guinness and Irene Worth to lead the cast, made Sir Tyrone director, and hired Tanya Moiseiwitsch as its designer. On 31 October 1952, an Ontario corporation, the Stratford Shakespearean Festival of Canada Foundation received its articles of incorporation. The first president was Harrison A. Showalter, and the first vice-president was Alfred M. Bell.

=== The tent theatre, 1953 ===
In late 1952, with auditions underway for the inaugural season, the festival required an architect to design its theatre. Guthrie telephoned Ned Corbett, whom he had met in Edmonton in 1931, to ask if Corbett knew of any architects who could work on the project. Corbett recommended Robert Fairfield, who in 1946 had married his daughter Joan. The firm of Rounthwaite & Fairfield was formed by partners Cyril Frederick Thomas Rounthwaite (1917–1995) and Robert Calvin Fairfield (1918–1994), both of whom were graduates of the University of Toronto. Patterson and Guthrie arranged an initial meeting with Fairfield at the University Club of Toronto in December 1952. At a dinner in 1984, Fairfield recounted, "the kind of theatre Guthrie wanted did not exist anywhere in the world. There were, therefore, no prototypes or copybooks that would lead an architect toward a ready-made solution. Like a submersible aircraft carrier, the theatre at Stratford had to be invented, and there I was... ready to invent it."

On 22 January 1953, Rounthwaite & Fairfield received the official commission to design a theatre for the new festival's first season. The project specified that the theatre would seat around 1,500 persons and have a backstage area for around 80 persons. The entire duration of the project would be 24 weeks, including only 12 weeks of construction. The John Gaffney Construction Company Limited of Stratford was given the building contract.

Fairfield planned the theatre around the thrust stage that Moiseiwitch had designed. The architects' design for the new theatre was of a circular concrete bleacher covering 252 degrees, divided in seven 36-degree sections, and 134 feet in diameter. At the time of construction, funding for the festival itself was uncertain, therefore, the architects had to consider financial failure in their planning and keep costs as low as possible. Rather than build a permanent cover for the theatre bleachers, they designed instead a tent structure to cover it. Four main masts supported the square tent, which had rounded corners with 45 degree radiuses. A false ceiling made of cotton sheets was hung from the tent ceiling. The sheets were sprayed with fireproofing, which hardened them and allowed them to function as acoustic baffles. During construction, tent master Roy "Skip" Manley was brought in to supervise. Fairfield said of the project, "the architect-client relationship, begun in the spirit of adventure, ended in almost surprising accord in view of the difficult obstacle course negotiated by both. The words of the Bard are recalled with considerable feeling – 'all's well that ends well.' "

On Sunday, 12 July 1953 following the town's church services, citizens gathered at the new theatre for the opening ceremonies. The service was opened by the Ven. Archdeacon F. Gwynne Lightbourne of the Anglican Church, and then the Rev. Donald B. MacKay of the Presbyterian Church gave an address. Following this, Tyrone Guthrie presented Showalter a flag, based on the Shakespeare coat of arms, sent by the Royal Shakespeare Theatre in Stratford-upon-Avon. Archdeacon Lightbourne dedicated the theatre, saying, "in the faith of Jesus Christ we dedicate this theatre to the glory of God and for the deepening and enrichment of the lives of His people, in the name of the Father and of the Son and of the Holy Ghost. Amen." At the time of the dedication, decorations remained around the town from the Coronation of Elizabeth II on 2 June, lending to the atmosphere of celebration.

The first performance at the theatre took place on Monday, 13 July 1953, with a production of Richard III.

=== The permanent theatre, 1957 ===
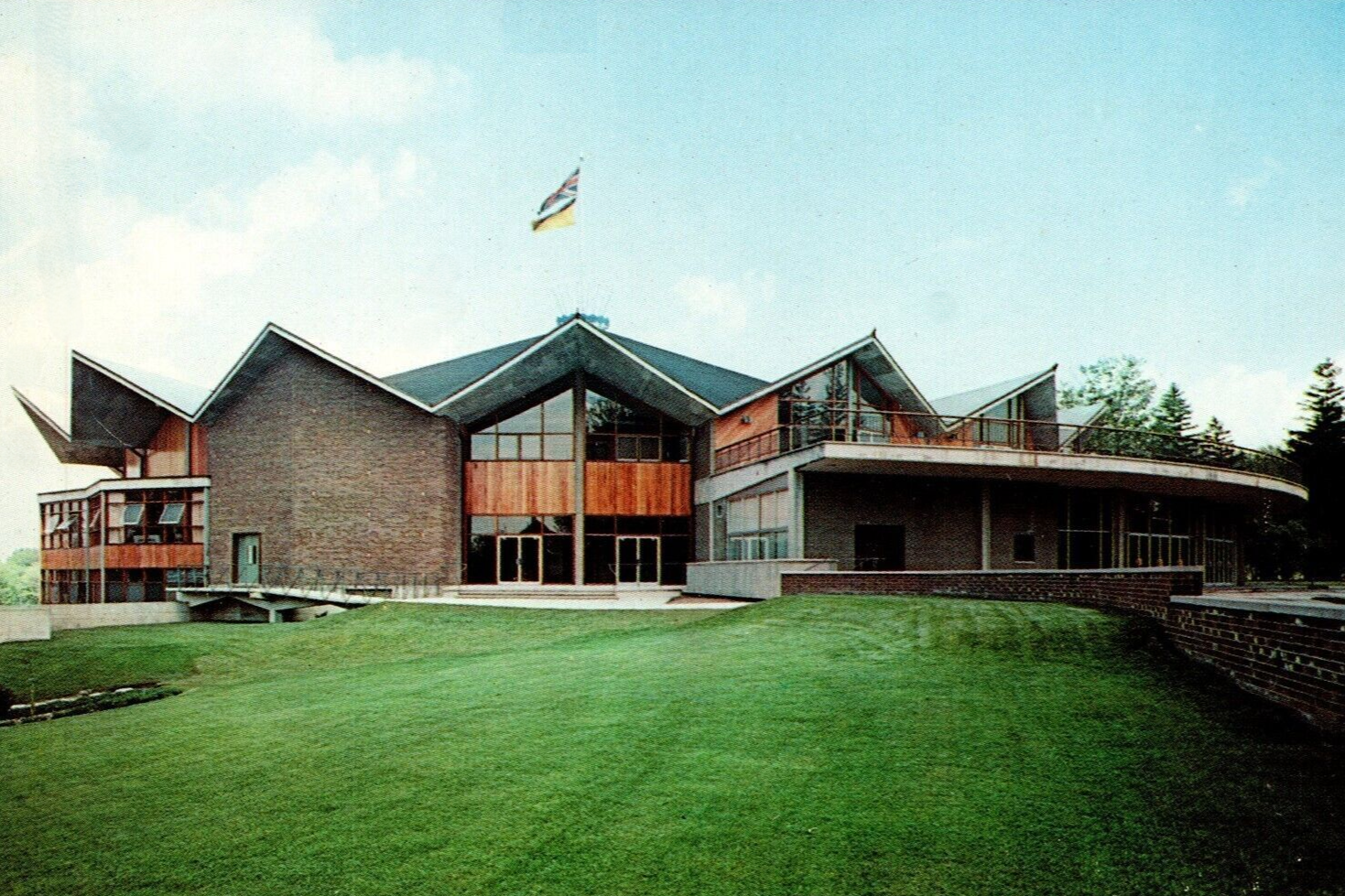
The permanent theatre in 1957

In December 1955, a sketch of the proposed permanent theatre appeared in the Toronto Daily Star. On 25 August 1956, following the end of the 1956 season, the tent came down for the final time and construction began on the new building.

In its announcement of the new permanent structure, an architectural journal noted that "the buoyant charm of a temporary shelter contending with the elements infused the tent-theatre with a sort of mystic personality. Festival goers of romantic persuasion, wilting in the summer heat and exposing themselves to the vagaries of the weather, emerge with a tingling sense of having lived briefly under the spell of adventure, at no inconsiderable risk to themselves." However, the journal noted, the theatre was liked much less by actors.

On Saturday, 26 January 1957, governor general Vincent Massey laid the cornerstone for the building. Archdeacon Lightbourn, who had dedicated the first theatre in 1953, gave the dedication for the second building also. At the ceremony, Massey said, "this is an occasion which must be profoundly moving to all of us here. It is an event unique in our history. We are marking a great moment in the story of an enterprise which began as a local effort with unbelievable ambitions. We now see it as a national achievement winning incredible success." The chairman of the campaign to raise the $1.5 million for construction was A. Bruce Matthews.

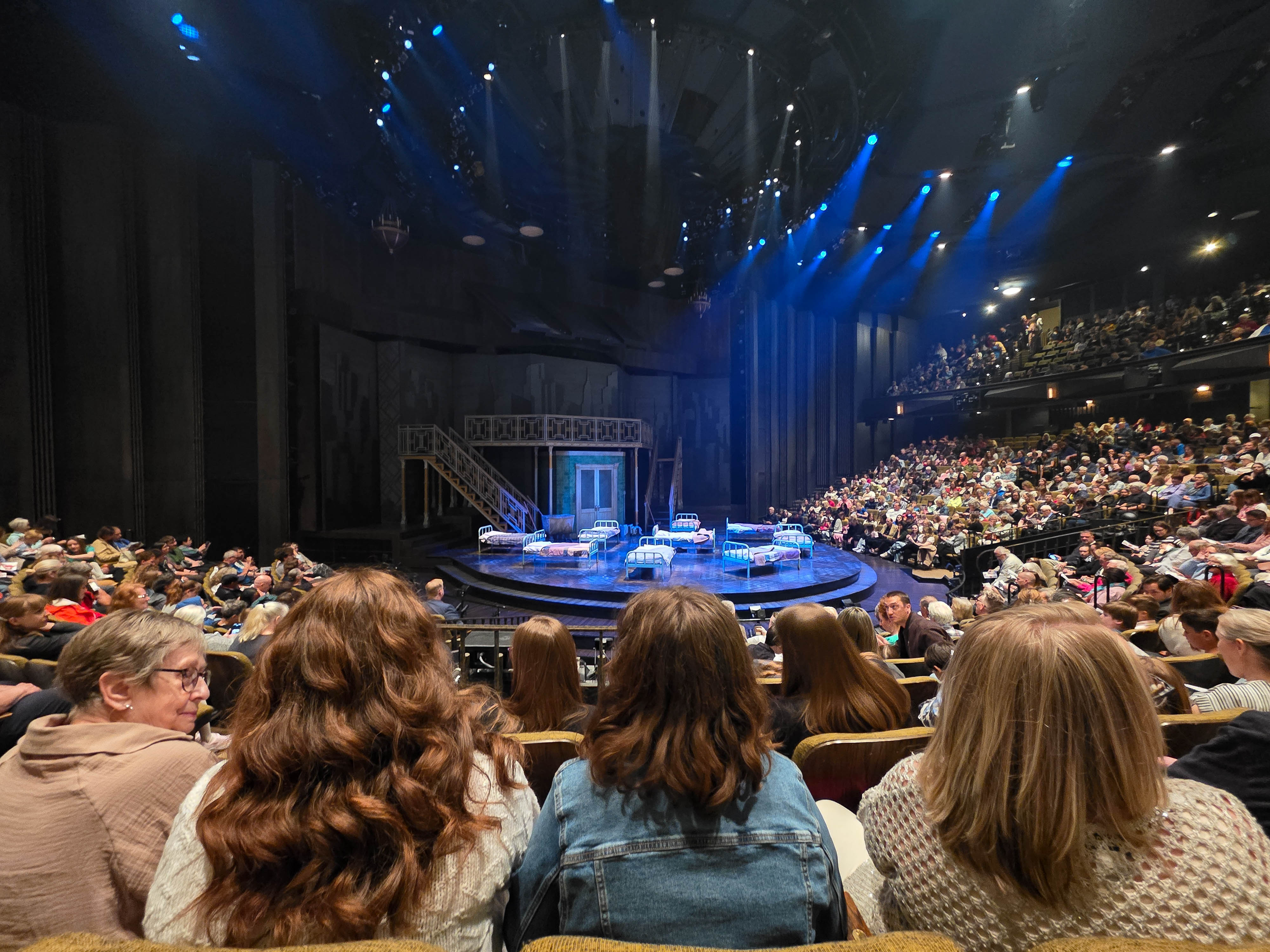
Interior of the theatre in 2025 during a production of Annie

The new theatre building was 200 feet in diameter; the foyer extended another 40 feet in diameter and ran 160 feet along the outside wall. The circular building was made up of 34 bays. The original bleachers were reduced from 252 degrees to 220 degrees; however, a new 20-foot cantilevered balcony was constructed adding 858 seats, bringing the total seating capacity to 2,192. At the end of construction, the original wooden seats were removed and replaced by new metal tip-up seats made by Canadian Office and School Furniture Company Limited of Preston, Ontario. The seats won a 1957 design award from the National Industrial Design Council.

Instead of Gaffney, the Foundation Company of Canada was awarded the contract to build the theatre. The structural engineers were Morrison Hershfield Millman & Huggins; mechanical engineers were Frost Granek & Associates; electrical consultants were Jack Chisvin & Associates; and the acoustical consultant was Robert Tanner. Shortly before the theatre opened, engineer Charles Hershfield presented a paper on its structure at the annual meeting of the Engineering Institute of Canada in Banff.

The dedication ceremony for the new theatre took place on Sunday, 30 June 1957. Over 3,000 packed into the theatre to watch the event. On stage were Walter Barfoot of the Anglican Church, Alexander D. MacKinnon of the Presbyterian Church, James S. Thomson of the United Church, John C. Cody of the Catholic Church, and Rabbi Solomon Frank. Archdeacon Lightbourne, now a member of the festival's board of governors, was on the stage also. On Monday, 1 July 1957, the new theatre opened with a performance of Hamlet.

In 1958, Festival Theatre was awarded a gold medal in the Massey Medals for Architecture.
