= Jacob Two-Two Meets the Hooded Fang =

Jacob Two-Two Meets the Hooded Fang may refer to the following:

- Jacob Two-Two Meets the Hooded Fang (book), a 1975 book by Mordecai Richler
- Jacob Two-Two Meets the Hooded Fang (1978 film), a 1978 film adaptation
- Jacob Two Two Meets the Hooded Fang (1999 film), a 1999 film adaptation
- "Jacob Two Two vs. the Hooded Fang", the first episode of the TV series Jacob Two-Two (2003-2006)
