= Don Shipley (stage director) =

- Born: Canada

Don Shipley is one of Canada’s leading Artistic Directors, with an extensive career in Canadian and International theatre and the performing arts. He is known for leading the Arts and Culture component of the 2015 Pan American Games in Toronto.

In his wide-ranging career, he has held positions as the Co-Artistic Director of the Stratford Shakespeare Festival, Artistic Director of the Dublin International Theatre Festival, Artistic Director of the World Stage Festival and Performing Arts at Harbourfront Centre, Artistic Director of the Grand Theatre Company in London, Artistic Founding Director of the Belfry Theatre. In the area of film and television he has also worked at both CBC television and the National Film Board of Canada.

More recently, Mr. Shipley has served as the Creative Advisor to the Pan Am Games for Toronto 2015, and as Artistic Associate of Soulpepper Theatre Company and Boston’s Arts Festival. He has served as an executive producer for Luminato, Festival of Arts and Creativity, and consultant for Crow’s Theatre Company (Toronto), as well as the Curitiba Festival in Brazil.

He continues his work as a casting director for Cirque du Soleil, consultant for Juste Pour Rire and the Curitiba Festival (Brazil) and is a member of the National Resource Board for the Magnetic North Festival. He is also an Associate Director for Soulpepper Theatre Company, and an Advisor for Crow’s Theatre. Mr. Shipley continues to serve on the Arts Council for Imperial Tobacco in Montreal.

He has directed at major theater companies across Canada and Europe, including the Shaw Festival, the Stratford Shakespeare Festival, The Grand Theatre, the National Arts Centre, The Vancouver Playhouse, The Belfry Theatre, Manitoba Theatre Centre, Canada Day Celebrations in Ottawa, and Palazzo Theatre in Amsterdam.

- He has been awarded Canada Council prizes, Dora Awards, Guthrie Awards, and the prestigious Prix Alliance Award from the Ministry of Culture in France.

Positions Shipley has held include:

- Artistic director at Victoria's Belfry Theatre from 1976 to 1979
- Artistic director of the Grand Theatre in London, Ontario, from 1984 to 1986
- Manager of performing arts at Harbourfront Centre, Toronto from 1988 to 2001
- Artistic director of the Dublin Theatre Festival from 2005 to 2007
- Artistic director of the Stratford Shakespeare Festival in 2008
