= Tom Patterson (theatre producer) =

Canadian journalist, founder of the Stratford Festival

- Born: 11 June 1920; Stratford, Ontario
- Died: 23 February 2005 (aged 84); Toronto, Ontario
- Education: University of Toronto (BA 1948)
- Spouse: Dorothy Westgarth Hoyle (m. 1948)

Harry Thomas Patterson OC OOnt (11 June 1920 – 23 February 2005) was a Stratford, Ontario born journalist who went on to found the Stratford Festival of Canada, then called the Stratford Shakespearean Festival, North America’s largest classical repertory theatre company.

== Biography ==
Patterson was a veteran of World War II and a journalist writing for Maclean's magazine in the early 1950s. From the time that he was a teenager, he had thought that his hometown of Stratford, Ontario should be home to performances of Shakespeare's plays. The town was suffering from industrial decline due to the declining fortunes of the rail industry. Patterson, with no experience of the theatre, proposed the idea of a theatre festival. In 1952, he invited the prominent British director Tyrone Guthrie to visit Stratford and help bring their idea of a Shakespearean theatre to fruition. When Guthrie accepted the offer to visit, national newspapers started to take notice. Patterson told The Globe and Mail he wanted to provide "Canadian acting talent the opportunity to work with top directors and actors without having to leave the country". For his part, Guthrie was interested in a venture that "offers a fresh advance in the production of Shakespeare".

With Guthrie supporting the Festival idea, Patterson persuaded the town council to back it, and had an enthusiastic committee of local citizens to help organize it. Guthrie advised him to hire a big name for the first production, so Patterson received a small loan from the city council so he could visit Alec Guinness and invite him to perform in the opening season. The festival has grown and expanded significantly since that time.

Patterson served as the festival's general manager during the first season and worked in other capacities until 1967. He also founded the touring company Canadian Players with actor Douglas Campbell and took part in the establishment of a number of cultural institutions, including the Canadian Theatre Centre and the National Theatre School. Patterson was also the founder of the Dawson City Gold Rush Festival.

Patterson was made an Officer of the Order of Canada in 1967 and was also awarded the Order of Ontario. He also received honorary degrees from the University of Toronto and the University of Western Ontario. One of the festival theatres was named after him in 1991, as is one of the islands in the Avon River.

His memoirs, First Stage: The making of the Stratford Festival, co-authored with Allan Gould, were published in 1986.
