= Avon River (Ontario) =

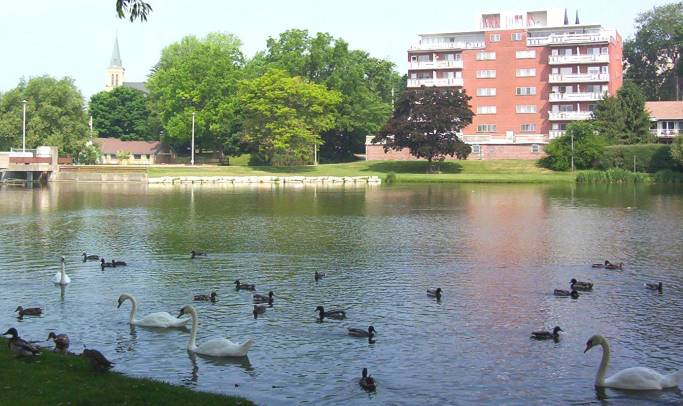
- Lake Victoria, in Stratford, part of the Avon River

- Location of the mouth of the Avon River in southern Ontario
- Etymology: after the River Avon in England

Location
- Country: Canada
- Province: Ontario
- County: Perth
- Municipalities: Perth East; Perth South

Physical characteristics
- Source: Field
  - location: Perth East
  - coordinates: 43°23′32″N 80°49′14″W
  - elevation: 390 m (1,280 ft)
- Mouth: North Thames River
  - location: Perth South
  - coordinates: 43°18′18″N 81°10′03″W
  - elevation: 308 m (1,010 ft)
- Length: 37 km (23 mi)
- Basin size: 1,678 km^{2} (648 sq mi)
- Discharge
  - average: 2.2 m^{3}/s (78 cu ft/s)

Basin features
- River system: Great Lakes Basin

The Avon River is a river in Perth County, Ontario, Canada. The river was named after the River Avon in England when the town of Stratford was founded on its banks in 1832. The Avon River rises northeast of Stratford and flows southwest, flowing into the North Thames River near St. Marys. It was originally known as the Little Thames River.

== Course ==
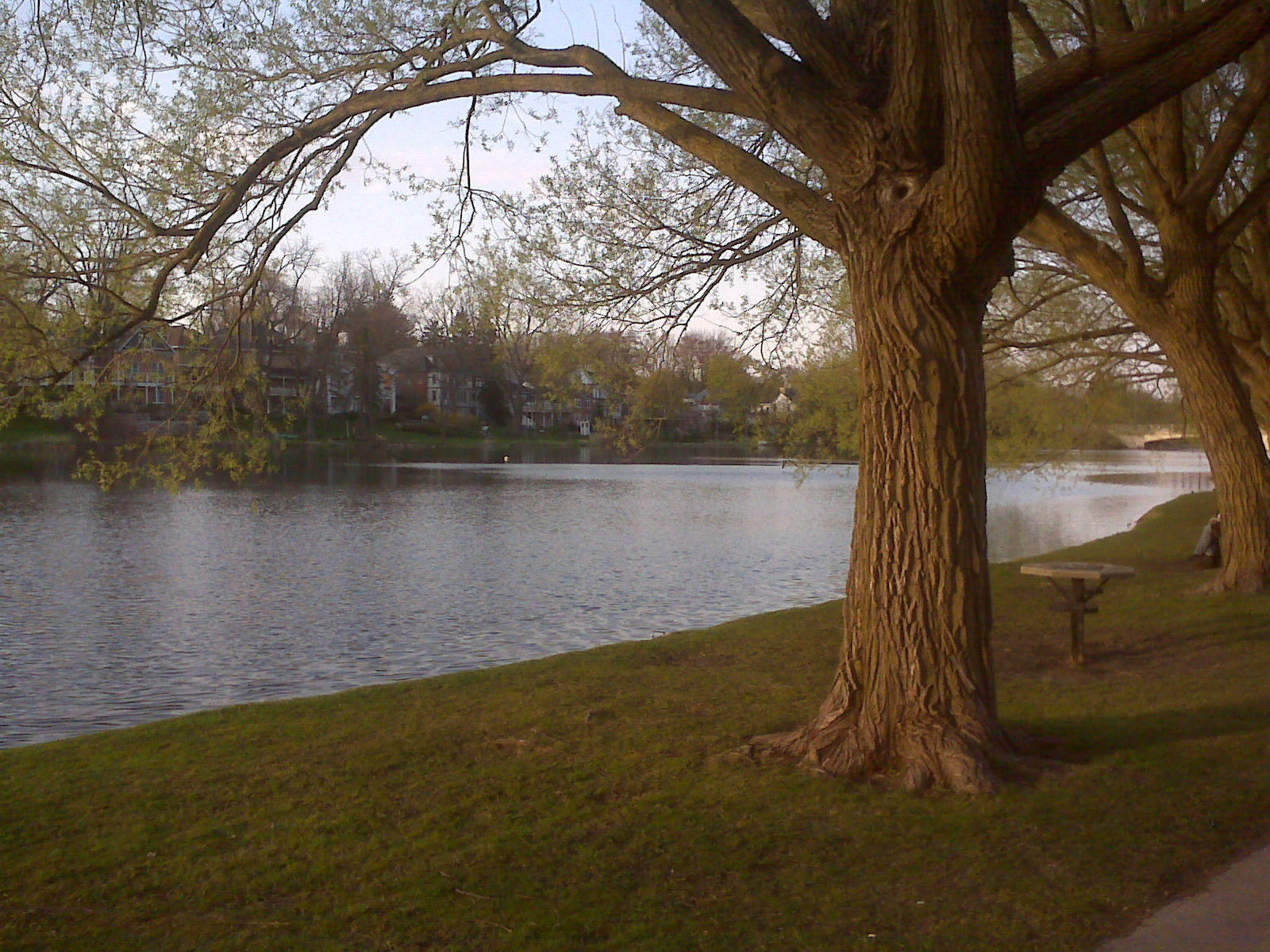
Another view of Lake Victoria in Stratford

The river begins in a field northeast of the community of Shakespeare in Perth East. It flows west to the north of the community, south of Brocksden, and into Lake Victoria, a seasonal reservoir created by the Thomas Orr Dam, in Stratford. The Avon River continues west through the community of Avonton in Perth South, and heads south through the community of Avonbank. It then empties into the North Thames River, as a left tributary, between the community of Motherwell to the north and the town of St. Marys to the south.

== Tributaries ==
- Dunseith Drain
- Douglas Drain
- Hislop Drain
- Court Drain
- Kuhne Drain
- Central School Drain
- Sheerer Drain

== See also ==
- List of rivers of Ontario

== Sources ==
- "Toporama - Topographic Map Sheet 40P6". Atlas of Canada. Natural Resources Canada. Archived from the original on 2010-02-10.
- "Avon River Watershed". Upper Thames River Conservation Authority. 2010-06-22.
- "Avon River Watershed Report Card". Upper Thames River Conservation Authority.
