= List of Saving Hope episodes =

Saving Hope is a Canadian television supernatural medical drama that debuted on the CTV and NBC networks simultaneously on June 7, 2012. The show's central character is Dr. Alex Reid (Erica Durance), a doctor whose fiancé, Dr. Charles Harris (Michael Shanks), is in a coma after being in a car crash. The show follows the life of Harris in his coma state, and Reid dealing with patients, and "hoping" that he will survive. Dr. Reid is the Chief Surgical Resident at Hope Zion Hospital in Toronto, and Dr. Harris would normally be the Chief of Surgery at Hope Zion, but had been replaced due to his current condition.

In September 2012, NBC pulled the last two episodes of the first season, releasing them online as they subsequently cancelled the series. In early 2014, Ion Television picked up the US rights to the first three seasons of the show, airing them from the start on October 13, 2015 and including those two unaired episodes. Season three premiered on April 5, 2016. And then Ion made a deal with CTV's parent Bell Media to co-produce season 4 and future seasons of the series. Season 4 premiered in 2017. On December 17, 2015, CTV and Ion ordered a fifth and final season of the series, which aired on CTV from March 12, 2017 through August 3, 2017, and premiered on Ion in early 2018 and ended in the summer of that year. During the course of the series, 85 episodes of Saving Hope aired over five seasons.

== Series overview ==
Season	Episodes	Originally released	
Season	Episodes	First released	Last released
1	13	June 7, 2012	September 13, 2012
2	18	June 25, 2013	February 27, 2014
3	18	September 22, 2014	February 18, 2015
4	18	September 24, 2015	February 14, 2016
5	18	March 12, 2017	August 3, 2017

== Episodes ==
=== Season 1 (2012) ===
No. overall	No. in season	Title	Directed by	Written by	Original release date	Can. viewers (millions)
1	1	"Pilot"	David Wellington	Malcolm MacRury & Morwyn Brebner	June 7, 2012	1.52
Dr. Alex Reid and her fiancé Dr. Charles Harris are involved in a car crash well on the way to their wedding. Minutes later, Charlie falls into a coma. He now experiences life "hoping" that he will survive. Over his patient's objection, Dr. Goran saves a veteran's arm. An unknown injured man does not survive a bus crash. On her first rotation in the ER, Maggie Lin helps deliver a baby, and deals with two teens who shared a "love potion".
2	2	"Contact"	David Wellington	Morwyn Brebner	June 19, 2012	1.60
Dr. Alex Reid deals with a kid, Cal, who has cancer. He goes into a coma, and meets Dr. Charles Harris. Charlie asks Cal to send a message to Alex for him, when Cal wakes up. Despite this, the boy forgets Charlie's name. Charlie's ex-wife suggests in-coma arousal therapy. Meanwhile, surgeons Joel Goran and Maggie Lin deal with a lady who will die without surgery. Due to their religion, her husband refuses treatment.
3	3	"Blindness"	John Fawcett	Adam Pettle	June 21, 2012	1.44
Alex and Maggie treat Benjamin Munk, a patient discovered to have psychological problems. Alex realizes that he has Münchausen syndrome, he fakes problems or inflicts injuries on himself so that he can be hospitalized. Alex tries to wake Charlie with coma arousal therapy, but Shahir later finds no change in his status. Charlie helps a deceased patient resolve his issues with his brother, who has to undergo a risky surgical procedure from Joel, which is a success. Also, the staff realizes Maggie and Joel hooked up when the two are caught acting strangely, and Gavin fails in asking Maggie on a date.
4	4	"The Fight"	Kelly Makin	Greg Nelson	June 28, 2012	1.50
An exhausted Alex works the night shift in the ER and assists a hockey star who was attacked while trying to prove his toughness. He refuses a CT scan, leading Alex to wonder if he is hiding something. The patient actually has brain trauma and is afraid the news will end his career. Also, a young victim of a stabbing appears with Charlie in spirit form several times to learn he is going to die. The boy survives and Charlie wonders if it is also possible for his own return.
5	5	"Out of Sight"	John Fawcett	Aaron Martin	July 5, 2012	1.39
Scott has been in a coma for 27 years and does not quite have the same view as Charlie does regarding his situation, although he harbours abandonment issues with his wife. Charlie then realizes that he has to assist others in his waking from his coma. After Alex successfully surgically re-attaches a hand, she has a party at her apartment with her co-workers. Although the mood is festive, her exhaustion causes her to have a breakdown and realize that she has nearly forgotten about Charlie. Joel comforts her.
6	6	"The Great Randall"	Peter Wellington	Sherry White	July 12, 2012	1.41
A patient is brought into Hope Zion with rebar protruding from his chest, but yet has no knowledge of how it got there nor exhibits any pain. His belongings are searched and a psychic's business card is found. The doctors deduce that the patient has been hypnotized. The psychic known as "The Great Randall" is called in and it is learned that the patient has been suffering from photosensitivity and stomach pain for years. Someone jokes that the patient is a vampire and Alex realizes the patient has porphyria. Randall can also see Charlie's spirit form, who asks his assistance in communicating with Alex. The idea works until Randall asks for money from Alex to continue talking to Charlie. Maggie and Joel commit to being exclusive with each other.
7	7	"Consenting Adults"	John Fawcett	Malcolm MacRury & Waneta Storms	July 19, 2012	1.41
Joel performs surgery on Karn, whose self-implanted horns have become infected. The medical team decides to remove the horns, against Karn's vehement wishes, which leads to a psychiatric consultation. Meanwhile, Alex prepares to conduct a standard tumor removal on patient Sandhya (Gia Sandhu). However, the patient has an adverse reaction to the anesthesia and slips into a coma. There, while seemingly content with not waking up from her coma, she philosophizes about love and religion with Charlie. He learns that Sandhya has been forced into marriage and has yet to find love in her own way. Their mutual discussions elicit an innocent kiss before she is brought out of her coma. Charlie's ex-wife Dawn returns to check on Charlie's condition and reveals that she is petitioning for a DNR order.
8	8	"Heartsick"	David Wellington	Morwyn Brebner & Adam Pettle	July 26, 2012	1.68
Dawn and Alex await a legal decision on whether to resuscitate Charlie. Meanwhile, they must work together on a heart transplant surgery. The donor is a deceased prisoner that Charlie must help "cross over". Their discussion is a change from those Charlie has had with others in spirit form, he has to make peace with what is eventually going to happen. Joel and Maggie continue their rocky relationship, as he still has feelings for Alex. His tension with Maggie allows Gavin to step up and make a move on her, leading to a kiss between them.
9	9	"Bea, Again"	Peter Wellington	Esta Spalding	August 16, 2012	1.67
Charlie is taken off the ventilator, but breathes on his own, causing Dawn to change her mind about the DNR. In his coma state, Charlie meets an old doctor friend whose mission is to help Charlie "cross over". During their discussions, they see Alex's patient Bea, who has been diagnosed with Hodgkin's lymphoma. The two ethereal doctors surmise that Bea is suffering from aphasia and will get worse if untreated. Alex soon realizes what is wrong with her. Meanwhile, Dr. Goran's patient is a paralyzed woman who is discovered not to be paralyzed. He deduces that she is someone who uses pain as a distraction from accepting the loss of her husband. Dr. Reycraft is appointed Chief Resident.
10	10	"A New Beginning"	Steve DiMarco	Aaron Martin	August 23, 2012	1.46
Still reeling from witnessing a patient's suicide and nursing his broken hand, Goran asks Kinney for a leave of absence, Instead, she suggests taking a road trip—together. During their travel, they assist in a roadside crash and later have sex. Back at Hope Zion, Charlie, in his coma state, meets a deceased therapist who learns the real reason Charlie is not waking up. Afraid of being left alone, which stems from his parents dying when he was young, Charlie deals with these fears by staying in a coma. He cannot be left by loved ones if he is the one who leaves.
11	11	"The Law of Contagion"	T. W. Peacocke	Greg Nelson	August 30, 2012	1.64
Dr. Hamza tries transcranial magnetic stimulation on Charlie to help him wake up. In his coma state, Charlie bleeds from his forehead where a TMS electrode is attached. He also learns that he witnessed the car crash that killed his parents when he was a boy—he simply blocked it from his memory. This causes him to temporarily wake from the coma, which no one immediately witnesses. They are distracted when a sick airline passenger is rushed to the hospital. As Alex performs emergency surgery on the passenger, she begins to realize the patient may be infected with a deadly and contagious virus. A specialist declares the hospital safe and Alex returns to notice Charlie had moved.
12	12	"Ride Hard or Go Home"	Ken Girotti	Adam Pettle	September 6, 2012	1.43
Shahir and Alex plan a last-resort procedure for Charlie, which forces Charlie to come to terms with his past. A female jockey undergoes risky surgery that results in partial paralysis, and Joel quits, feeling guilty for this outcome. Gavin crosses the line with a patient when he starts to become personally involved, and disaster ensues. After Alex urges Shahir to keep trying, Charlie finally wakes up. This episode did not air on NBC but was posted online and released on DVD.
13	13	"Pink Clouds"	David Wellington	Morwyn Brebner	September 13, 2012	1.55
Joel tries to save a patient from flesh-eating disease and Alex has some hard decisions to make. Charlie enjoys being back in the land of the living and plans on marrying Alex as soon as possible. Then he discovers he didn't leave the spiritual plane behind as much as he thought, when he realizes that a woman he's been talking to, is in fact already dead. This episode did not air on NBC but was posted online instead, and released on DVD.

=== Season 2 (2013–14) ===
No. overall	No. in season	Title	Directed by	Written by	Original release date	Can. viewers (millions)
14	1	"I Watch Death"	David Wellington	Morwyn Brebner	June 25, 2013	1.08
Charlie returns to Hope Zion for his first shift as a doctor since waking from the coma and is surprised that he can still see the spirits of people who died at the hospital.
15	2	"Little Piggies"	Kelly Makin	Adam Pettle	July 2, 2013	1.00
Alex learns to stand up to Dawn.
16	3	"Why Waste Time"	John Fawcett	Story by : Greg Nelson; Teleplay by : Waneta Storms	July 9, 2013	0.83
While struggling under the pressure of deciding on her specialty Alex is inspired by an immigrant doctor who needs her help to save his wife.
17	4	"Defense"	Kelly Makin	Malcolm MacRury	July 16, 2013	0.91
The doctors are forced to deal with people from their past as Alex, Charlie, and Joel take on the daunting task of operating on a malpractice lawyer known for suing every doctor in his path.
18	5	"The Face of the Giant Panda"	Ken Girotti	John Krizanc	July 23, 2013	0.94
Alex must become the unlikely advocate for a violent young prisoner brought in to Hope Zion Hospital, while Joel connects with a disfigured refugee and tries to convince Dr. Dana Kinney to come back to operate on him. Meanwhile, a spirit who is familiar to many Hope Zion doctors shows up in the morgue when Charlie is about to do a routine procedure.
19	6	"All Things Must Pass"	Jeff Woolnough	John Callaghan	July 30, 2013	1.01
After a young, healthy, and hunky fireman dies suddenly at a Hope Zion Hospital fundraiser, Alex must take the stand at Hope Zion's Morbidity and Mortality (M&M) Rounds to find out what went wrong and who is to blame. Meanwhile, Charlie and Zack deal with a nervous aspiring nun with an ankle fracture that turns serious when they stumble upon a potentially fatal allergy. A busy Joel struggles to balance his workload as Chief with his growing commitment to Sonja, and must decide if he's ready to step up to the plate.
20	7	"Bed One"	Peter Wellington	Noelle Carbone	August 6, 2013	1.06
When a heat wave hits the city, Alex is appointed Trauma Team Leader as the hospital is faced with an influx of patients during a blackout. With no back-up power available, Dawn and Charlie must figure out a way to continue their surgery as Joel and Maggie attempt to keep a patient alive while stuck in an elevator.
21	8	"Defriender"	Jason Priestley	Morwyn Brebner & Maggie Gilmour	August 13, 2013	1.10
When Alex and Joel end up stranded in the middle of nowhere with a severely injured couple, they’re forced to use only what's around them to stabilize the pair until paramedics arrive. Meanwhile, back at Hope Zion Hospital, Charlie must try to save the wounded leg of his former college roommate as Gavin attempts to help Shahir improve his bedside manner.
22	9	"Vamonos"	Jeff Woolnough	Adam Pettle & Amanda Fahey	August 20, 2013	1.10
When Alex is forced to put a patient's gender reassignment surgery on hold, she discovers a secret in his medical history that could save his surgery, but tear his life apart. Charlie deals with a patient who is healthy, sane – and convinced she is going to die at midnight. Meanwhile, Joel secretly helps Sonja deal with a patient of hers who's been admitted to Hope Zion Hospital.
23	10	"Wishbones"	David Wellington	Sherry White	January 2, 2014	1.67
When Alex's brother Luke is admitted to Hope Zion Hospital in critical condition, Joel and Charlie must work together to keep him alive while keeping his admittance a secret from Alex. Meanwhile, Alex figures out a way to remove a tumour from a patient pregnant with twins, while Maggie is thrown off her game by the patient's gorgeous OB/GYN.
24	11	"En Bloc"	Gregory Smith	Morwyn Brebner & Adam Pettle	January 9, 2014	1.72
Alex risks a dangerous surgery on a seemingly inoperable tumor to save a young boy's life. Meanwhile, Joel struggles with the challenges of being Chief of Surgery as Charlie struggles with the spirit of Alex's dead brother Luke.
25	12	"Nottingham 7"	David Wellington	John Krizanc	January 16, 2014	1.44
When the life of one of the doctors at Hope Zion Hospital is at risk, Alex has to put her personal and professional issues aside. Charlie has to deal with the ghost of a ballerina.
26	13	"Wide Awake"	Yon Motskin	Waneta Storms	January 23, 2014	1.52
Alex's been tricked into a blind double date, and ends up rushing her mystery man to the ER. Charlie struggles with a spirit in the middle of a soldier's life-or-death surgery.
27	14	"43 Minutes"	David Wellington	Aubrey Nealon	January 30, 2014	1.57
As Alex leaves Hope Zion she becomes a witness to an accident that brings her back to the hospital.
28	15	"Don't Poke the Bear"	Peter Wellington	John Krizanc & Sherry White	February 6, 2014	1.52
A couple is attacked by a bear, but Alex and Charlie think there's more to the story.
29	16	"Breathless"	Peter Stebbings	Noelle Carbone	February 13, 2014	1.59
Alex races to find an organ replacement, while Charlie is pushed to his breaking point.
30	17	"Twinned Lambs"	Adam Pettle	David Wharnsby	February 20, 2014	1.53
Alex struggles to help an older woman who starts to believe the year is 1985. Meanwhile, Charlie and Joel are pitted against one another by two best friends with identical shoulder injuries.
31	18	"Broken Hearts"	David Wellington	Morwyn Brebner	February 27, 2014	1.68
Dawn diagnoses Alex with an irregular heartbeat. Charlie faces the consequences of his fight with Joel. Alex gets stabbed in her chest with scissors and her heartbeat fluctuates. Dawn searches for her and finds her when Alex presses the emergency button. Charlie arrives and she is rushed into surgery. Her heart rate rises and she loses consciousness. Charlie tries to revive her and later discovers her spirit standing behind him.

=== Season 3 (2014–15) ===
Season 3 episode titles are named after films.

No. overall	No. in season	Title	Directed by	Written by	Original release date	Can. viewers (millions)
32	1	"Heaven Can Wait (Part 1)"	David Wellington	Morwyn Brebner	September 22, 2014	1.1
After being stabbed in the heart in the Season 2 finale, Dr. Alex Reid has a profound experience in the liminal space, while a desperate Charlie Harris and his ex-wife, Dawn Bell race against the clock to save her life. Meanwhile, Dr. Joel Goran is pulled in to the ER to treat a suicidal patient that tests his duty as a doctor, and Maggie Lin makes a bold decision that changes her relationship with Gavin Murphy.
33	2	"Kiss Me Goodbye (Part 2)"	Kelly Makin	Adam Pettle	September 25, 2014	1.2
With her body still in a coma, spirit form Alex shares an emotional journey with Charlie in the spirit world as he "ghost-doctors" a brain-dead mother-to-be. Meanwhile, Joel forms a tight bond with a lively drug addict while trying to treat his necrotic leg. Hope Zion Hospital also welcomes its new OB/GYN, Dr. Sydney Katz, who throws Maggie off her game.
34	3	"Awakenings"	John Fawcett	Patrick Tarr	October 2, 2014	1.76
Alex awakes from her coma suffering memory loss. Maggie deals with the aftermath of her miscarriage. The ER teams treat victims of an explosion. Another patient encourages Alex in the hallway.
35	4	"Stand By Me"	Michael Shanks	Waneta Storms	October 9, 2014	1.45
Alex returns to work for the first time since her stabbing. She is introduced to her buddy colleague, as she returns. Joel ends up involved in a deadly situation at a local street clinic. Gavin shares a euphoric experience, with someone unlikely.
36	5	"Breaking Away"	Peter Wellington	Malcolm MacRury	October 16, 2014	1.53
A car crash brings a 'she-bear' mother and her son to the hospital. Alex and Joel discover the mother is in need of a transplant and her son is very adamant that he be involved in the surgery. Dawn instructs them on procedure and, before they know it, the trio are brought before an ethics panel, including one very unconvinced psychiatrist. Meanwhile, the mother's spirit is determined to get Charlie to do her bidding, which includes stepping out of his comfort zone when consoling her son. Then, Charlie finds himself pulled into the ER to help Zach with a patient whose obsession might cost him his life. Plus, new resident Rian and Maggie search the hospital for Hope Zion's very first "code brown", which results in having to answer to a shaken Dawn.
37	6	"Joel 2:31"	T. W. Peacocke	Amanda Fahey	October 23, 2014	1.41
Alex, Joel and Maggie face a mysterious case. Charlie has an unexpected link with a patient. Zach questions his abilities as a father.
38	7	"The Way We Were"	Steve DiMarco	John Krizanc	November 26, 2014	1.19
Shahir and Alex perform surgery to try and save the memory of a woman who is suffering from Alzheimer's, but Dr. Hamza requires life-saving surgery. Tom has to make a decision when he discovers a secret. Charlie is embroiled in Dawn's plan.
39	8	"The Heartbreak Kid"	David Wharnsby	Fiona Highet	December 3, 2014	1.25
Alex and Charlie team up on a teenage girl's double surgery; Joel spends a day at a clinic and joins in a search-and-rescue mission in a ravine. Meanwhile, Maggie gets on Dr. Katz's bad side.
40	9	"The Other Side of Midnight"	Peter Wellington	Jennifer Kassabian & Tammy Marlowe Johnson	December 10, 2014	1.33
The relationship between Alex and Joel is tested by a marathon surgery session involving an injured race-car driver. Meanwhile, Charlie has an eventful day off and a hospital "frequent flyer" keeps a number of doctors hopping.
41	10	"Days of Heaven"	Peter Stebbings	Malcolm MacRury	December 17, 2014	1.34
Alex and Shahir operate on a patient who drilled his own head. Maggie suspects Dana's daughter is stealing painkillers. Meanwhile, Joel sleeps with Selena.
42	11	"The Parent Trap"	T. W. Peacocke	John Krizanc & Amanda Fahey	January 7, 2015	1.33
Alex gets caught between Dana and her daughter. Dawn and Melinda deals with a patient who intends to sue the hospital for malpractice. Charlie encounters an MMA patient and her rival.
43	12	"Hearts of Glass"	Jason Priestley	Patrick Tarr	January 7, 2015	1.33
News of Alex's pregnancy and the mystery of who the father is circles the hospital. Joel returns after his brief incarceration. Maggie studies for the board exam and deals with a patient who has a fear of doctors. Meanwhile, Alex and Dawn continue to deal with their patients in need of a heart donor.
44	13	"Narrow Margin"	Jeff Woolnough	Morwyn Brebner & Adam Pettle	January 14, 2015	1.38
Joel waits for a call from his lawyer on whether or not he goes to trial. Alex tries to save a boy who was crushed by a tree. And Zach thinks he might have prostate cancer. Guest stars: Melanie Merkosky, Marline Yan, Dylan Authors
45	14	"Trading Places"	Gregory Smith	Waneta Storms	January 21, 2015	1.33
Joel's father visits. Alex and Maggie deal with a patient who refuses Sydney's help with her baby. Charlie helps a young soul find his body.
46	15	"Remains of the Day"	Eleanore Lindo	John Krizanc	January 28, 2015	1.41
Alex wrangles the team in a high bid effort to diagnose the mysterious illness that haunts a beloved English teacher. Charlie must explain his actions. Dawn must make a big decision.
47	16	"A Simple Plan"	James Genn	Fiona Highet & Patrick Tarr	February 4, 2015	1.44
Alex and Charlie try to save the life of a man on the run; a spirit won't leave Alex alone; Maggie and Zach try to help a couple; Joel and Shahir help a bride walk down the aisle.
48	17	"Fearless"	Gregory Smith	Adam Pettle	February 11, 2015	N/A
Alex and Dana try to save a single mother's life; a hockey player's mobility is at stake; Charlie gets advice on winning back Alex; Sydney comes clean.
49	18	"All the Pretty Horses"	David Wellington	Morwyn Brebner	February 18, 2015	1.73
Joel and Zach help a soldier who's been impaled by a mortar rocket during a field training exercise. Charlie and Dawn try to save a hand while Maggie and a really pregnant Alex take their board exams. Alex gives birth. Joel's daring procedure to remove the mortar rocket saves his patient but not himself.

=== Season 4 (2015–16) ===
Season 4 episode titles are The Rolling Stones song titles.

No. overall	No. in season	Title	Directed by	Written by	Original release date	Can. viewers (millions)
50	1	"Sympathy for the Devil"	James Genn	Adam Pettle	September 24, 2015	1.49
Dr. Alex Reid returns to work, arriving at Hope Zion Hospital with a car crash victim she encountered en route, and she's forced to play nice with new General Surgeon on call, Dr. Patrick Curtis. The day gets even more chaotic when Alex is called away to treat Tom Crenshaw, a convicted murderer brought in for emergency treatment. Meanwhile, Dr. Charlie Harris begins to confront his feelings about the paternity of Alex's child, all while juggling an insistent Dr. Shahir Hamza who is looking for backup on his proposal for a new Alzheimer's study. In the ER, Dr. Zach Miller's patient is admitted with symptoms mirroring those of Ebola, putting himself and Dr. Maggie Lin at risk of exposure to the deadly virus.
51	2	"Beasts of Burden"	John Fawcett	Patrick Tarr	October 1, 2015	1.37
Back from maternity leave for just two days, Dr. Reid is given the privilege of assisting renowned surgeon Dr. Clara Levine. When the protagonist begins to question the senior surgeon's surgical decision she quickly finds herself on the wrong side of the operating table, replaced by the ever-charming and ever-tactful Dr. Patrick Curtis.
52	3	"Start Me Up"	Steve DiMarco	Noelle Carbone	October 8, 2015	1.27
Dr. Alex Reid has to juggle her duties as a new mother and a surgeon when she takes a junior resident under her wing.
53	4	"Miss You"	Peter Stebbings	Ley Lukins	October 15, 2015	1.28
Alex struggles to forgive and forget when the man responsible for her deceased brother's drug problem is admitted to the hospital. Charlie investigates ghost Crenshaw and realises he's guilty of two murders.
54	5	"Heart of Stone"	David Wellington	Waneta Storms	October 22, 2015	1.31
A young motocross rider is diagnosed with leukemia, forcing Alex to navigate family secrets in order to put her young patient on the road to recovery.
55	6	"Rock and a Hard Place"	Jason Priestley	Fiona Highet	October 29, 2015	1.27
Alex must decide whether or not to use information Charlie gets from a patient's spirit in order to save their life.
56	7	"Can't You Hear Me Knocking?"	T. W. Peacocke	Tammy Marlowe Johnson	November 5, 2015	N/A
Still shattered after being raped by her now-former boyfriend Lane, Dawn goes on a leave of absence. Shahir becomes interim chief of surgery and unnerves staffers including Alex with his strict standards, including a caffeine moratorium. But Alex persuades Shahir to sign onto an experimental aggressive treatment to attack her patient's very aggressive brain tumour.
57	8	"Waiting on a Friend"	James Genn	Adam Pettle and Graeme Stewart	November 12, 2015	N/A
The death of a trapeze artist sets off a transplant chain of donors and recipients, leading Alex and Shahir to juggle complications and patients to keep the chain moving. Meanwhile, Dana, who's cancer has returned, has to deal with an overly conversational professor of poetry during chemo.
58	9	"Shattered"	David Wellington	Malcolm MacRury	November 26, 2015	1.25
When a bomb goes off at a local charity run, Hope Zion Hospital receives the majority of the casualties, including some of its own doctors, especially Maggie, who has a delayed and dangerous reaction to the impact. After a showdown with an angry crowd and a zealous police detective over the bomber himself undergoing surgery, Dawn talks to the detective about bringing sexual assault charges against Lane, who issued her a none-too-veiled career threat.
59	10	"Emotional Rescue"	Gregory Smith	Malcolm MacRury	December 3, 2015	1.21
In the second half of a two-part episode, Charlie returns to Hope Zion Hospital to find Maggie in jeopardy. In a race against time, Charlie struggles to find out what is wrong with his colleague and friend. Meanwhile, Alex, who's still dealing with her part in treating the bomber, becomes determined to make amends by saving Maggie's last patient Shelby. Along with Sydney, who returned to Hope Zion for the case, Alex must convince Shelby and her husband that letting go is sometimes the only thing standing in between you and getting better when complications threaten her leg. In the ER, Cassie and Jeremy Bishop help a bereaved father deal with the death of his daughter. Dawn elects to file charges against Lane after the detective surprises her by hinting another, reluctant staffer also came forward.
60	11	"Shine a Light"	Peter Wellington	Patrick Tarr and Fiona Highet	December 10, 2015	1.16
When an ice storm strikes the city on Christmas Eve, Alex and Dawn struggle to keep a good Samaritan alive long enough for her family to say goodbye.
61	12	"All Down the Line"	Steve DiMarco	Jennifer Kassabian	January 7, 2016	1.13
When a chef with oral cancer refuses care, Alex must confront her own feelings about the way Dana is handling her treatment.
62	13	"Goodbye Girl"	Peter Stebbings	Noelle Carbone & Katrina Saville	January 14, 2016	1.33
Alex must maintain her professionalism when Kristine lands at Hope Zion Hospital after a drunk-driving crash with baby Luke's blanket.
63	14	"You Can't Always Get What You Want"	Michael Shanks	Ley Lukins	January 21, 2016	1.30
Alex and Jeremy struggle to find the truth when all the symptoms of a chronically ill child point towards his mother as the cause.
64	15	"Not Fade Away"	Gregory Smith	Waneta Storms	January 28, 2016	1.27
To see what his life would be like without his special gift, Charlie treats a superstitious farmer without help from his spirit intel. Zach and Dawn save an injured hiker.
65	16	"Torn and Frayed"	Steve DiMarco and Erica Durance	Patrick Tarr	February 4, 2016	1.32
Alex teams up with Cassie to free a young woman from her abusive husband, well Dawn faces a series of life-threatening complications when a patient's pacemaker malfunctions.
66	17	"Anybody Seen My Baby"	David Wharnsby	Noelle Carbone	February 14, 2016	1.21
After Kristine suffers a stroke, Alex discovers the nurse's past may not be as she remembers, so Alex teams up with Charlie to find a way to bring peace to the already troubled spirit.
67	18	"Let Me Go"	James Genn	Adam Pettle	February 14, 2016	1.21
Charlie's condition proves more dangerous than initially thought, as Alex and Shahir struggle to save his life.

=== Season 5 (2017) ===
No. overall	No. in season	Title	Directed by	Written by	Original release date	Can. viewers (millions)
68	1	"Doctor Destiny"	David Wellington	Adam Pettle	March 12, 2017	0.94
Well searching for Charlie, Alex finds a caterer who was caught in the crossfire; Grace's mother asks for a priest; Dana consults with Cassie about a male stripper.
69	2	"Midlife Crisis"	Kelly Makin	Noelle Carbone	March 19, 2017	N/A
Alex and Maggie discover that one of the car crash survivors that they are treating has breast cancer, and is a match for their cancer study. Meanwhile, Dana's resolve to re-certify in Trauma is tested when Dawn pushes her to treat a mangled motorcyclist, and Charlie is pulled into surgery before his arm is completely healed.
70	3	"Birthday Blues"	Gregory Smith	Patrick Tarr	March 26, 2017	N/A
It is a not so Happy Birthday for Alex, who's still reeling from her split with Charlie. To make matters worse, she makes a promise to a young girl, who's own birthday is derailed by her father's sickle cell crisis. Charlie treats a paranormal skeptic, only to discover this supernatural naysayer has a haunting of his own. Cassie confronts her inner fear of parasites with some exposure therapy, as she treats a brother/sister duo riddled with every infestation.
71	4	"A Stranger Comes to Town"	James Genn	Ley Lukins	April 2, 2017	N/A
Tempers flare as Dev's med school rival, Billy Scott arrives at Hope Zion, while Alex breaks the rules and puts her job in jeopardy to help Manny save the life of an at-risk youth, and Charlie and Maggie treat a War of 1812 re-enactor, who's complications align with the historical character he is playing.
72	5	"Tested and Tried"	Gregory Smith	Malcolm MacRury	April 9, 2017	N/A
Although Alex's patient is desperate for a liver-transplant, the only donor is an estranged father hiding in witness protection, forcing Alex to go to new depths to make sure both survive. Hope Zion's CEO Thomas Leffering cuts costs by banning expensive surgeries, butting heads with a defiant Dawn.
73	6	"Doctor Robot"	James Genn	Adriana Maggs	April 16, 2017	N/A
Alex copes with her mother, diagnosed as terminally ill.
74	7	"Gutted"	Gregory Smith	Graeme Stewart	April 23, 2017	0.89
Following complications with their cancer study patient, Alex and Maggie face a tough lawyer; a car crashes into the ambulance bay.
75	8	"Knowing Me, Knowing You"	Steve DiMarco	Fiona Highet	April 30, 2017	N/A
Charlie and Manny find themselves in competition; Maggie and Dawn are at odds when they have differing approaches well treating a patient.
76	9	"All Our Yesterdays"	Steve DiMarco	Patrick Tarr & Thomas Pepper	May 7, 2017	N/A
When a John Doe comes into the hospital after being struck by a subway train, it is a race against the clock to save his life.
77	10	"Change of Heart"	David Wharnsby	Noelle Carbonne & Katrina Saville	June 8, 2017	0.83
Alex tries to distract herself from her grief and finds one she never expected, a teen with a chronic kidney illness and a "saviour sister" who was conceived purely to provide a kidney. Charlie and Shahir track down Alex's older brother Doug. Charlie reinstates Sydney's privileges at Hope-Zion. Maggie processes her feelings for Sydney and admits she had always wondered what it would be like to be with her. She asks Sydney to promise that she will not leave again.
78	11	"Nightmares and Dreamscapes"	Steve DiMarco	Ley Lukins	June 15, 2017	0.93
Well Charlie tries to save a young man's life, he is haunted by a mischievous spirit named Blake who, unbeknownst to Charlie, has a tragic past.
79	12	"Leap of Faith"	Jason Priestley	Adam Pettle & Hayden Simpson	June 22, 2017	0.81
Maggie and Alex work to deliver the baby of a doctor's wife, well Charlie treats a magician who shattered his legs during an illusion gone wrong.
80	13	"Problem Child"	Teresa Hannigan	Aaron Bala & Patrick Tarr	June 29, 2017	0.90
Alex tries to help a patient who hurt himself breaking into a house; a friend of Dr. Dev Sekara has been beaten by the police; a heart patient wishes to open an animal sanctuary.
81	14	"We Need to Talk About Charlie Harris"	Michael Shanks	Adam Pettle & Graeme Stewart	July 6, 2017	0.89
Alex is challenged about the value of holistic medicine when her patient, who's also her meditation instructor, insists on being awake during her surgery. Charlie's continuing disruptions from the spirit world mean his abilities are questioned. Two young filmmakers go to Hope Zion Hospital. Charlie's psychiatrist tries to convince him he conflates the spirit world people with the real world living.
82	15	"Fix You"	Alison Reid	Katrina Saville	July 13, 2017	0.71
The board questions the hospital staff about Charlie's behaviour; Alex's instructor convinces her to use new-age techniques; Shahir agrees to do an in-utero surgery. Charlie shocks Alex and the staff with a decision he makes before the board can make a formal finding.
83	16	"La famiglia"	Peter Wellington	Noelle Carbone	July 20, 2017	1.00
Alex has to put her concerns for Charlie aside when a chance to perform a cancer surgery arises, upon a woman who's condition is compounded by guilt over having alienated her son-in-law following her daughter's death many years ago.
84	17	"First and Last"	Jordan Canning	Patrick Tarr	July 27, 2017	0.91
Alex and Charlie put their wedding plans aside; Shahir takes a special interest in a case; a coma patient who wakes up with no memory, but whose wife is willing to work with him to help restore it. Alex and Charlie marry at last, in an unusual ceremony.
85	18	"Hope Never Dies"	James Genn	Adam Pettle	August 3, 2017	1.13
Following a mass casualty crash involving a bus full of teenagers, Alex and Charlie interrupt their honeymoon journey to rush to the scene to try and save the kids well waiting for backup to arrive. The victims are transported to Hope Zion where a troubling discovery is made about the bus driver who's unexpected heart attack caused the crash. Alex and Luke survive their injuries but Charlie falls into a coma and cannot be saved this time. Grieving Alex brings the Hope Zion staff together to remember Charlie the way he would have wanted, earmarking his vital organs for critical transplants. As the hospital family looks toward their lives' next chapter, Alex and Charlie reunite in the spirit world, with a twist.
