= Long Day's Journey into Night =

1956 play by Eugene O'Neill

- First edition 1956
- Original language: English
- Written by: Eugene O'Neill
- Characters: Mary Cavan Tyrone; James Tyrone; Edmund Tyrone; James Tyrone Jr. Cathleen
- Subject: An autobiographical account of an explosive home life with a morphine-addicted mother and alcoholic father.
- Genre: Tragedy
- Setting: The summer home of the Tyrones, August 1912

Premiere
- Date: February 2, 1956
- Place: Royal Dramatic Theatre; Stockholm, Sweden

Long Day's Journey into Night is a play in four acts written by American playwright Eugene O'Neill in 1939–1941 and first published posthumously in 1956. It is widely regarded as his magnum opus and one of the great American plays of the 20th century. It premiered in Sweden in February 1956 and then opened on Broadway in November 1956, winning the Tony Award for Best Play. O'Neill received the 1957 Pulitzer Prize for Drama posthumously for Long Day's Journey into Night. The work is openly autobiographical in nature. The "long day" in the title refers to the setting of the play, which takes place during one day.

It has been called the finest work of American theater, by critic Pauline Kael.

A Moon for the Misbegotten is a sequel to the play.

== Summary ==
The play takes place on a single day in August 1912. The setting is Monte Cristo Cottage, the seaside home of the Tyrones in Connecticut. The four main characters are the semi-autobiographical representations of O'Neill, his older brother, and their parents, including his father, actor James O'Neill.

The play portrays a family struggling to grapple with the realities and consequences of each member's failings. The parents and two sons blame and resent each other for various reasons; bitterness and jealousy serve as proxies for ultimately failed attempts at tenderness and compassion. The family's enduring emotional and psychological stress is fueled by their shared self-analysis, combined with articulate honesty. The story deals with addiction, unfulfilled dreams, moral flaws, and the struggle of family relationships.

== Synopsis ==
=== Act I ===
Living-room of the Tyrones' summer home, 8:30 am on a day in August, 1912

James Tyrone is a 65-year-old actor who had long ago bought a "vehicle" play for himself and had established his reputation based on this one role in which he had toured for years. Although that "vehicle" had served him well financially, he is now resentful that his having become so identified with this character has limited his scope and opportunities as a classical actor. He is a wealthy but somewhat miserly man. His money is all tied up in property, which he hangs onto despite impending financial hardship. His dress and appearance are showing signs of his strained financial circumstances, but he retains many of the mixed affectations of a classical actor in spite of his classic attire.

His wife Mary recently returned from treatment for morphine addiction and has put on some much-needed weight as a result. (Mary's troubles are alluded to, but not made clear until much later in the play.) She is looking much healthier than the family has been accustomed to, and they remark frequently on her improved appearance. However, she still retains the haggard facial features of a long-time addict. As a recovering addict, she is restless and anxious. She also suffers from insomnia. When Edmund, her younger son, hears her moving around at night and entering the spare bedroom, he becomes alarmed, thinking she is succumbing to her addiction. He questions her about it indirectly, but she reassures him that she just wanted to get away from her husband's snoring.

In addition to Mary's problems, the family is burdened by Edmund's coughing; they fear that he might have consumption (tuberculosis), and are anxiously awaiting a doctor's diagnosis. Edmund is more concerned about the effect a positive diagnosis might have on his mother than on himself. The constant possibility that she might relapse worries him still further.

=== Act II ===
The same, around 12:45 pm; and about a half-hour later

Jamie and Edmund taunt each other about stealing their father's alcohol and watering it down so he won't notice. They speak about Mary's conduct. Jamie berates Edmund for leaving their mother unsupervised. Edmund berates Jamie for being suspicious. Both, however, are deeply worried that their mother's addiction may have resurfaced. Jamie points out to Edmund that they had concealed their mother's addiction from him for ten years, explaining that his naiveté about the nature of the disease was understandable but deluded. They discuss the upcoming results of Edmund's tests for tuberculosis, and Jamie tells him to prepare for the worst.

Mary appears. She is distraught about Edmund's coughing, which he tries to suppress so as not to alarm her, fearing anything that might trigger her addiction again. When Edmund accepts his mother's excuse that she had been upstairs so long because she had been "lying down", Jamie looks at them both contemptuously. Mary notices and starts becoming defensive and belligerent, berating Jamie for his cynicism and disrespect for his parents. Jamie is quick to point out that the only reason he has survived as an actor is through his father's influence in the business.

Mary speaks of her frustration with their summer home, its impermanence and shabbiness, and her husband's indifference to his surroundings. With irony, she alludes to her belief that this air of detachment might be the very reason he has tolerated her addiction for so long. Finally, unable to tolerate the way Jamie is looking at her, Mary asks him angrily why he is doing it. "You know!", he retorts, and tells her to take a look at her glazed eyes in the mirror.

=== Act III ===
The same, around 6:30 that evening

Mary and the family's maid/housekeeper Cathleen return home from their drive to the drugstore, where Mary has sent Cathleen in to purchase her morphine prescription. Not wanting to be alone, Mary does not allow Cathleen to go to the kitchen to finish making dinner and instead offers her a drink. Mary does most of the talking and discusses her love for fog but her hatred of the foghorn, and her husband's obsession with money. Mary, who has already taken some of her "prescription", talks about her past in a Catholic convent, the promise she had as a pianist, and plans for becoming a nun. She also makes it clear that, while she fell in love with her husband upon meeting him, she had never taken to the theatre crowd. She shows her arthritic hands to Cathleen and explains that the pain is why she needs drugs – an explanation which is untrue and transparent to Cathleen.

When Mary dozes off, Cathleen exits to prepare dinner. Mary wakes up and begins to have haunting memories about life before marriage. She decides that her prayers as an addict are not being heard by the Virgin Mary and decides to go upstairs to get more drugs. Before she can do so, Edmund and James Sr. return home.

The men are drunk, but they realize that Mary is back on morphine. Jamie has not returned home, but has elected instead to continue drinking and to visit prostitutes. After calling Jamie a "hopeless failure", Mary warns that his bad influence will drag his brother down as well. After seeing the condition that his wife is in, James wishes he hadn't bothered to come home, and tries to ignore her as she continues her remarks, which include blaming him for Jamie's drinking. Then, as often happens in the play, Mary and James try to get over their animosity and attempt to express their love for one another by remembering happier days. When James goes to the basement to get another bottle of whiskey, Mary continues to talk with Edmund.

When Edmund reveals that he has consumption, Mary refuses to believe it, and attempts to discredit Dr. Hardy, due to her inability to face the reality and severity of the situation. She accuses Edmund of attention-seeking. In retaliation, Edmund reminds his mother that her own father died of consumption, and then, before exiting, he adds how difficult it is to have a "dope fiend for a mother." Alone, Mary admits that she needs more morphine and hopes that someday she will "accidentally" overdose, because she knows that if she did so on purpose, the Virgin never would forgive her. When James comes back with more alcohol he notes that there was evidence that Jamie had attempted to pick the locks to the whiskey cabinet in the cellar, as he has done before. Mary ignores this and bursts out that she is afraid that Edmund is going to die. She also confides to James that Edmund does not love her because of her drug problem. When James attempts to console her, Mary again rues having given birth to Edmund, who appears to have been conceived to replace a baby they had lost before Edmund's birth. When Cathleen announces dinner, Mary indicates that she is not hungry and is going to bed. James goes in to dinner all alone, knowing that Mary is really going upstairs to get more drugs.

=== Act IV ===
The same, around midnight

Edmund returns home to find his father playing solitaire. While the two argue and drink, they also have an intimate, tender conversation. James explains his stinginess, and also reveals that he ruined his career by staying in an acting job for money. After so many years playing the same part, he lost his talent for versatility. Edmund talks to his father about sailing and of his failure to become a poet. They hear Jamie coming home drunk, and James leaves to avoid fighting. Jamie and Edmund converse, and Jamie confesses that although he loves Edmund more than anyone else, he wants him to fail. Jamie passes out. When James returns, Jamie wakes up, and they quarrel anew. Mary, lost in her drug-laden dreams of the past, comes downstairs. Holding her wedding gown, she talks about her convent days and how she lost her vocation by falling in love with James, while her husband and sons silently watch her.

== Cast and characters ==
Character	Stockholm premiere (1956)	Broadway debut (1956)	West End debut (1962)	Broadway revival (1986)	West End revival (2000)	Broadway revival (2003)	Broadway revival (2016)	West End revival (2018)	West End revival (2024)
James Tyrone Sr.	Lars Hanson	Fredric March	Laurence Olivier	Jack Lemmon	Charles Dance	Brian Dennehy	Gabriel Byrne	Jeremy Irons	Brian Cox
Mary Tyrone	Inga Tidblad	Florence Eldridge	Constance Cummings	Bethel Leslie	Jessica Lange	Vanessa Redgrave	Jessica Lange	Lesley Manville	Patricia Clarkson
Jamie Tyrone Jr.	Ulf Palme	Jason Robards	Dennis Quilley	Kevin Spacey	Paul Rudd	Philip Seymour Hoffman	Michael Shannon	Rory Keenan	Daryl McCormack
Edmund Tyrone	Jarl Kulle	Bradford Dillman	Ronald Pickup	Peter Gallagher	Paul Nicholls	Robert Sean Leonard	John Gallagher Jr.	Matthew Beard	Laurie Kynaston
Cathleen	Catrin Westerlund	Katherine Ross	Jodie Lynne McClintock	Jodie Lynne McClintock	Olivia Colman	Fiana Toinbin	Colby Minifie	Jessica Regan	Louisa Harland

- James Tyrone Sr. – 65 years old. He looks ten years younger and is about five feet eight inches tall but appears taller due to his military-like posture and bearing. He is broad-shouldered and deep-chested and remarkably good-looking for his age with light brown eyes. His speech and movement are those of a classical actor with a studied technique, but he is unpretentious and not temperamental at all with "inclinations still close to his humble beginnings and Irish farmer forebears". His attire is somewhat threadbare and shabby. He wears his clothing to the limit of usefulness. He has been a healthy man his entire life and is free of hang ups and anxieties except for fear of "dying in the poorhouse" and obsession with having money. He has "streaks of sentimental melancholy and rare flashes of intuitive sensibility". He smokes cigars and dislikes being referred to as the "Old Man" by his sons.
- Mary Cavan Tyrone – 54 years old, the wife and mother of the family who lapses between self-delusion and the haze of her morphine addiction. She is medium height with a young graceful figure, a trifle plump with distinctly Irish facial features. She was once extremely pretty and is still striking. She wears no make-up and her hair is thick, white and perfectly coiffed. She has large, dark, almost black, eyes. She has a soft and attractive voice with a "touch of Irish lilt when she is merry". Mary has been addicted to morphine since the difficult birth of her youngest son Edmund. The doctor who treated her simply gave her painkillers, which led to a longtime morphine addiction that continues to plague her.
- James "Jamie" Jr. – 33 years old, the older son. He has thinning hair, an aquiline nose and shows signs of premature disintegration. He has a habitual expression of cynicism. He resembles his father. "On the rare occasions when he smiles without sneering, his personality possesses the remnant of a humorous, romantic, irresponsible Irish charm – the beguiling ne'er-do-well, with a strain of the sentimentally poetic". He is attractive to women and popular with men. He is an actor like his father but has difficulty finding work due to a reputation for being an irresponsible, womanizing alcoholic. He and his father argue a great deal about this. Jamie often refers to his father as "Old Gaspard", a character from the opera Les cloches de Corneville, who is also a miser.
- Edmund – 23 years old, the younger and more intellectually and poetically inclined son. He is thin and wiry. He looks like both his parents but more like his mother. He has her big dark eyes and hypersensitive mouth in a long narrow Irish face with dark brown hair and red highlights from the sun. Like his mother, he is extremely nervous. He is in bad health and his cheeks are sunken. Later he is diagnosed with tuberculosis. He is politically inclined to have socialist leanings. He traveled the world by working in the merchant navy and caught tuberculosis while abroad.
- Cathleen – "The second girl", she is the summer maid. She is a "buxom Irish peasant", in her early twenties with red cheeks, black hair and blue eyes. She is "amiable, ignorant, clumsy with a well-meaning stupidity".

Several characters are referenced in the play but do not appear on stage:

- Eugene Tyrone – A son born before Edmund who died of measles at the age of two. He was infected by Jamie who was seven at the time and had been told not to enter his room but disobeyed. Mary believes that Jamie had the intent of hurting Eugene.
- Bridget – A cook.
- McGuire – A real estate agent who has swindled James Tyrone in the past.
- Shaughnessy – A tenant on a farm owned by the Tyrones.
- Harker – A friend of James Tyrone, "the Standard Oil millionaire", owns a neighboring farm to Shaughnessy with whom he gets into conflicts, often postulated to be based on Edward Harkness, Standard Oil heir, who had a summer home nearby in Waterford, Connecticut.
- Doctor Hardy – The Tyrones' physician at the insistence of James, though the other family members don't think much of him and suspect he is their doctor only because he is cheap.
- Captain Turner – The Tyrones' neighbor.
- Smythe – A garage assistant whom James hired as a chauffeur for Mary. Mary suspects he is intentionally damaging the car to provide work for the garage.
- The mistress – A woman with whom James had had an affair before his marriage, who had later sued him causing Mary to be shunned by her friends as someone with undesirable social connections.
- Mary's father – Died of tuberculosis.
- James's parents and siblings – The family immigrated to the United States when James was eight years old. His father abandoned the family two years later and returned to Ireland, where he died after ingesting rat poison. It was suspected suicide but James refuses to believe that. He had two older brothers and three sisters.

== History of the play ==
O'Neill finished revising the manuscript into its final version in March 1941. He did not want it ever produced as a play, and did not even want it published during his lifetime, writing to his friend, the critic George Jean Nathan: "There are good reasons in the play itself...why I'm keeping this one very much to myself, as you will appreciate when you read it."

O'Neill did not copyright the play. In 1945 he had a sealed copy of the manuscript placed in the document vault of publisher Random House, instructing that it not be published until 25 years after his death. He sent a second sealed copy to the O'Neill collection at Yale University.

Soon after O'Neill's death, his widow Carlotta Monterey demanded that Random House contravene O'Neill's explicit wishes and publish the play at once. "We refused, of course," wrote publisher Bennett Cerf in his memoirs, "but then were horrified to learn that legally all the cards were in her hand. … I do not regret that we took the stand we did, because I still think we were right." Monterey had the play published by the Yale University Press in 1956, with the bulk of the proceeds deeded to Yale's Eugene O'Neill Collection and for scholarships at its drama school.

According to Sarah Ruhl, the play was a gift Eugene O'Neill gave to his wife Carlotta Monterey on their twelfth wedding anniversary, writing: "Dearest, I give you the original script of this play of old sorrow, written in tears and blood."

== Autobiographical content ==
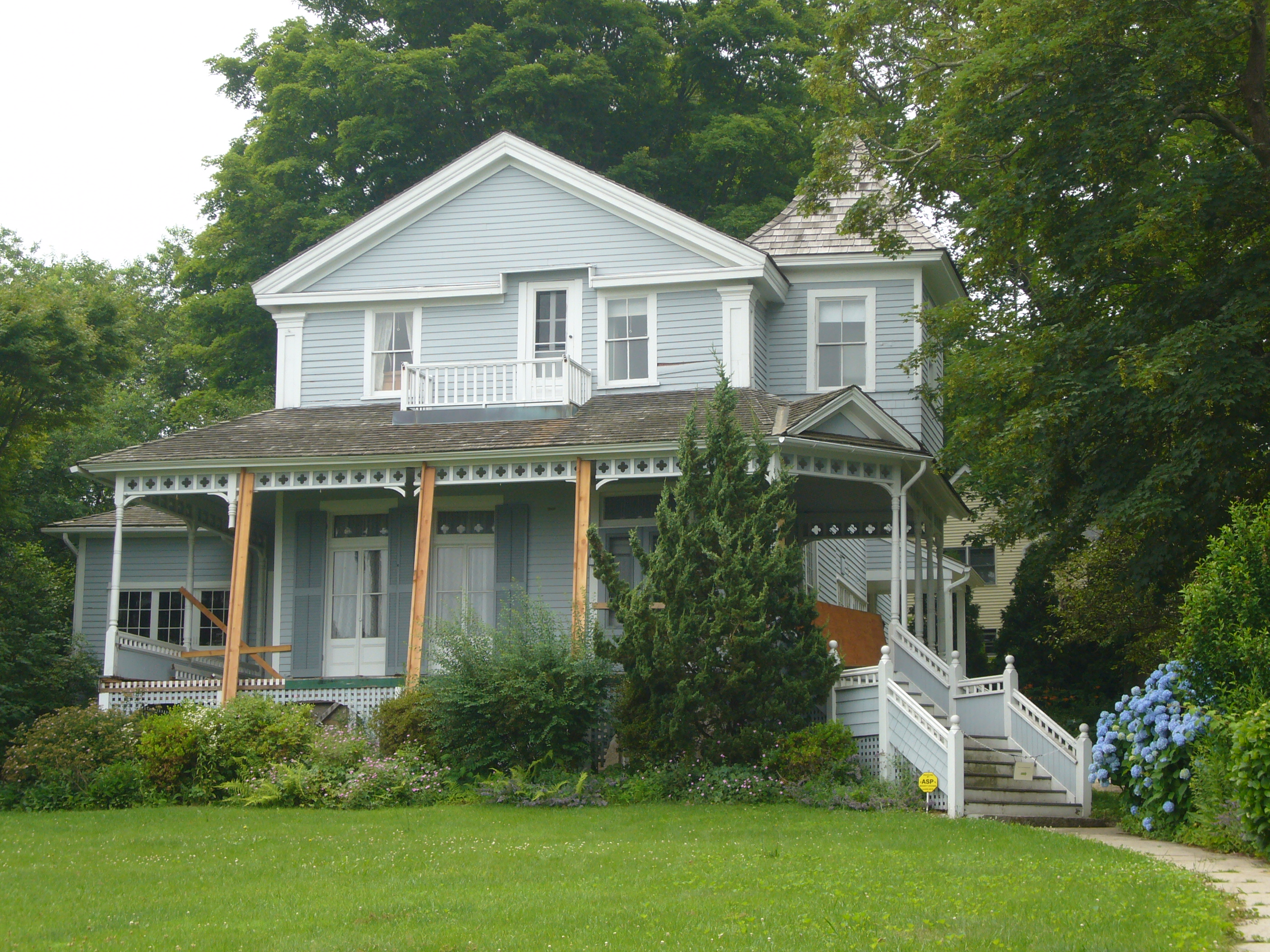
Monte Cristo Cottage, boyhood summer home of O'Neill and the setting for two of his works, Long Day's Journey into Night, and Ah, Wilderness!

In key aspects, the play closely parallels Eugene O'Neill's own life. The location, a summer home in Connecticut, corresponds to the family home Monte Cristo Cottage, in New London, Connecticut (the small town of the play). The actual cottage, today owned and operated by the Eugene O'Neill Theater Center, is made up as it may appear in the play. The family in the script corresponds to the O'Neill family, which was Irish-American, with three name changes. The family name "O'Neill" is changed to "Tyrone", which is the name of the earldom granted to Conn O'Neill by Henry VIII. The names of the second and third sons are reversed, "Eugene" with "Edmund". In fact, Eugene, the playwright, was the third and the youngest child, and he corresponds to the character of "Edmund" in the play. O'Neill's mother, Mary Ellen "Ella" Quinlan, corresponds to the character Mary Cavan. The ages are all the actual ages of the O'Neill family in August 1912.

Eugene O'Neill's father, James O'Neill, was a promising actor in his youth, as was the father in the play. He also shared the stage with Edwin Booth, who is mentioned in the play. James O'Neill achieved commercial success in the title role of Dumas' The Count of Monte Cristo, playing the title role about 6,000 times, but he was criticized for "selling out" for commercial success at the expense of artistic merit.

Eugene's mother Mary did attend Saint Mary's College, a Catholic school in the Midwest, in Notre Dame, Indiana. Subsequent to the date when the play is set (1912), but prior to the play's writing (1941–42), Eugene's older brother Jamie did drink himself to death (c. 1923).

Regarding O'Neill himself, by 1912 he had attended a renowned university (Princeton), spent several years at sea, and suffered from depression and alcoholism. He did contribute poetry to the local newspaper, the New London Telegraph, as well as reporting, and he was admitted to a sanatorium in 1912–13, suffering from tuberculosis (consumption), whereupon he devoted himself to playwriting. Thus, the events in the play are set immediately prior to O'Neill beginning his career in earnest.

== Productions ==
=== Premiere productions ===
Window card for the 1956 Broadway production of Long Day's Journey into Night starring Fredric March and Florence Eldridge

Long Day's Journey into Night was first performed on February 2, 1956, by the Royal Dramatic Theatre in Stockholm. The production was in Swedish (as Lång dags färd mot natt). It was directed by Bengt Ekerot, with the cast of Lars Hanson (James Tyrone), Inga Tidblad (Mary Tyrone), Ulf Palme (James Tyrone Jr.), Jarl Kulle (Edmund Tyrone) and Catrin Westerlund (Cathleen, the serving-maid). The production was universally praised by the critics.

The Broadway debut of Long Day's Journey into Night took place at the Helen Hayes Theatre on November 7, 1956, shortly after its American premiere at Boston's Wilbur Theatre. The production was directed by José Quintero, and its cast included Fredric March (James Tyrone), Florence Eldridge who was March's wife in real life (Mary Tyrone), Jason Robards Jr. ("Jamie" Tyrone), Bradford Dillman (Edmund), and Katherine Ross (Cathleen). The production won the Tony Award for Best Play and Best Actor in a Play (Fredric March), and the New York Drama Critics' Circle Award for Best Play of the season.

The play's first production in the United Kingdom came in 1958, opening first in Edinburgh, Scotland, and then moving to the Globe Theatre in London's West End. It was directed again by Quintero, and the cast included Anthony Quayle (James), Gwen Ffrangcon-Davies (Mary), Ian Bannen (Jamie), Alan Bates (Edmund), and Etain O'Dell (Cathleen).

=== Other notable productions ===
- 1970: Memorial Art Center (Atlanta); with Robert Foxworth (James), Gerald Richards (Jamie), Jo Van Fleet (Mary), directed by Michael Howard.
- 1971: Promenade Theatre (Off-Broadway), New York; with Robert Ryan (James), Geraldine Fitzgerald (Mary), Stacy Keach (Jamie), James Naughton (Edmund), and Paddy Croft (Cathleen), directed by Arvin Brown; 1971 Theatre World Award for Naughton and Drama Desk Vernon Rice Award for production. Recorded by Caedmon Records.
- 1971: National Theatre, London; with Laurence Olivier (James), Constance Cummings (Mary), Denis Quilley (Jamie), Ronald Pickup (Edmund), and Jo Maxwell-Muller (Cathleen), directed by Michael Blakemore. This production would be adapted into a videotaped television version, which aired 10 March 1973; the cast was as above, excepting the substitution of Maureen Lipman (Cathleen). The TV version was directed by Michael Blakemore and Peter Wood. Olivier won the Emmy Award for Outstanding Single Performance by an Actor in a Leading Role.
- 1973: The South Australian Theatre Company's Melbourne production is considered one of the landmark productions in Australian theatre, largely due to Patricia Kennedy's Mary, which was described as "the best female performance on the Melbourne stage in 1973".
- 1976: Brooklyn Academy of Music, New York; with Jason Robards Jr. (James), Zoe Caldwell (Mary), Kevin Conway (Jamie), Michael Moriarty (Edmund), and Lindsay Crouse (Cathleen), directed by Jason Robards Jr.
- 1986: Broadhurst Theatre (Broadway), New York; with Jack Lemmon (James), Bethel Leslie (Mary), Kevin Spacey (Jamie), Peter Gallagher (Edmund), and Jodie Lynne McClintock (Cathleen), directed by Jonathan Miller. A television version of this production was aired in 1987.
- 1988: Neil Simon Theatre (Broadway), New York; with Jason Robards Jr. (James), Colleen Dewhurst (Mary), Jamey Sheridan (Jamie), Campbell Scott (Edmund), and Jane Macfie (Cathleen), directed by José Quintero. This production ran in repertory with O'Neill's play, Ah, Wilderness!, (in which the author's youth and family are depicted as he wished they had been), featuring the same actors. Dewhurst was also the real-life mother of Campbell Scott (by her marriage to actor George C. Scott).
- 1988: Royal Dramatic Theatre, Stockholm; with Jarl Kulle (James), Bibi Andersson (Mary), Thommy Berggren (Jamie), Peter Stormare (Edmund), and Kicki Bramberg (Cathleen), directed by Ingmar Bergman.
- 1991: National Theatre, London and Bristol Old Vic co-production; with Timothy West (James), Prunella Scales (Mary), Seán McGinley (Jamie), Stephen Dillane (Edmund), and Geraldine Fitzgerald (Cathleen), directed by Howard Davies.
- 1994: Stratford Festival, Stratford, Ontario; with William Hutt (James), Martha Henry (Mary), Peter Donaldson (Jamie), Tom McCamus (Edmund), and Martha Burns (Cathleen), directed by Diana Leblanc. This production was made into a film in 1996, directed by David Wellington.
- 2000: Lyric Theatre, London; with Jessica Lange (Mary), Charles Dance (James), Paul Rudd (Jamie), Paul Nicholls (Edmund), and Olivia Colman (Cathleen).
- 2003: Plymouth Theatre (Broadway), New York; with Brian Dennehy (James), Vanessa Redgrave (Mary), Philip Seymour Hoffman (Jamie), Robert Sean Leonard (Edmund), and Fiana Toibin (Cathleen), directed by Robert Falls.
- 2005: Centaur Theatre, Montreal; with Albert Millaire (James), Rosemary Dunsmore (Mary), Alain Goulem (James Jr), Brendan Murray (Edmund), Laura Teasdale (Cathleen), directed by David Latham
- 2007: Druid Theatre, Galway; with James Cromwell (James), Marie Mullen (Mary), Aidan Kelly (Jamie), Michael Esper (Edmund), and Maude Fahy (Cathleen), directed by Garry Hynes.
- 2010: Co-production with Sydney Theatre and Artists Repertory Theatre, Sydney Theatre Company; with William Hurt (James), Luke Mullins (Edmund), Robyn Nevin (Mary), Emily Russell (Cathleen) and Todd Van Voris (Jamie), directed by Andrew Upton.
- 2010: Riksteatret (Norway); with Bjørn Sundquist (James), Liv Ullmann (Mary), Anders Baasmo Christiansen (Jamie), Pål Sverre Valheim Hagen (Edmund) and Viktoria Winge (Cathleen), directed by Stein Winge.
- 2011–2012 Apollo Theatre, London (UK); with David Suchet (James Tyrone) and Laurie Metcalf (Mary Tyrone), Trevor White (Jamie Tyrone), Kyle Soller (Edmund Tyrone) and Rosie Sansom as Cathleen, directed by Anthony Page. In Glasgow the production played at the Theatre Royal (26–31 March 2012).
- 2016: American Airlines Theatre (Roundabout Theatre Company), Broadway, New York; with Jessica Lange (Mary), Gabriel Byrne (James), Michael Shannon (James Jr.), John Gallagher Jr. (Edmund) and Colby Minifie (Cathleen) directed by Jonathan Kent.
- 2017: Geffen Playhouse, Los Angeles; with Jane Kaczmarek (Mary), Alfred Molina (James), Angela Goethals (Cathleen), directed by Jeanie Hackett.
- 2017, 2018: Monte Cristo Cottage (Flock Theatre), New London, CT; with Anne Flammang (Mary), Christie Max Williams (James), Eric Michaelian (James Jr.), Victor Chiburis (Edmund), Amy Bentley/Madeleine Dauer/C.S.E Cooney (Cathleen), directed by Derron Wood. This production was performed in the actual room where O'Neill set the play with an extremely limited and intimate audience. Certain performances took place over the course of entire days at the approximate times that the scenes take place to utilize natural lighting. The production received a special award from the CT Critics Circle.
- 2018: Stratford Festival, Stratford, Ontario (Canada); with Seana McKenna (Mary), Scott Wentworth (James), Gordon S. Miller (James Jr.), Charlie Gallant (Edmund), Amy Keating (Cathleen).
- 2018: Wyndham's Theatre, London (UK); with Lesley Manville (Mary), Jeremy Irons (James), Rory Keenan (James Jr.), Matthew Beard (Edmund), Jessica Regan (Kathleen), Richard Eyre’s production.
- 2022: Minetta Lane Theatre, Off-Broadway (NYC); with Bill Camp (James), Elizabeth Marvel (Mary), Ato Blankson-Wood (Edmund), Jason Bowen (Jamie). Off-Broadway production directed by Robert O'Hara (Slave Play). An audio recording of this adaption is now available to stream on Audible.
- 2024: Wyndham's Theatre, London (UK); with Patricia Clarkson (Mary), Brian Cox (James), Daryl McCormack (James Jr.), Laurie Kynaston (Edmund), Louisa Harland (Kathleen), directed by Jeremy Herrin.

== Film adaptations ==
The play was made into a 1962 film starring Katharine Hepburn as Mary, Ralph Richardson as James, Jason Robards as Jamie, Dean Stockwell as Edmund, and Jeanne Barr as Cathleen. The movie was directed by Sidney Lumet. At that year's Cannes Film Festival, Richardson, Robards and Stockwell all received Best Actor awards, and Hepburn was named Best Actress. Hepburn also earned a nomination for the Academy Award for Best Actress.

In 1973, the ITV Sunday Night Theatre program on British television presented a videotaped television version of the 1971 production at the National Theatre directed by Peter Wood and starring Laurence Olivier, Constance Cummings, Denis Quilley, and Ronald Pickup. Olivier won a Best Actor Emmy Award for this performance.

A 1982 TV film directed by William Woodman was produced by ABC featuring an all-African American cast of Earle Hyman (James), Ruby Dee (Mary), Thommie Blackwell (Jamie), and Peter Francis James (Edmund).

A 1987 TV film directed by Jonathan Miller starred Kevin Spacey as Jamie, Peter Gallagher as Edmund, Jack Lemmon as James Tyrone, Bethel Leslie as Mary, and Jodie Lynne McClintock as Cathleen. Lemmon was nominated for a Golden Globe for Best Performance by an Actor in Mini-Series or Made-for-TV Movie the following year.

A 1996 film adaptation was directed by Canadian director David Wellington and starred William Hutt as James, Martha Henry as Mary, Peter Donaldson as Jamie, Tom McCamus as Edmund and Martha Burns as Cathleen. The same cast had previously performed the play at Canada's Stratford Festival; Wellington essentially filmed the stage production without significant changes. The film swept the acting awards at the 17th Genie Awards, winning awards for Hutt, Henry, Donaldson and Burns. This version later was aired by PBS on its Great Performances series in 1999.

A 2018 Chinese film of the same name is not an adaptation: the plot is completely unrelated to the play.

A new film adaptation was filmed in 2022, directed by Jonathan Kent (in his feature directorial debut) and starring Jessica Lange, Ed Harris, Ben Foster, and Colin Morgan. The film premiered at the Dublin International Film Festival on 27 February 2025 with the UK Premiere on 28 February at Glasgow Film Festival. It will release in select theaters in the US on September 25, 2026.

== Awards and nominations ==
=== Original Broadway production ===
Year	Award ceremony	Category	Nominee	Result
1957	Tony Award	Best Play		Won
1957	Tony Award	Best Actor in a Play	Fredric March	Won
1957	Tony Award	Best Actress in a Play	Florence Eldridge	Nominated
1957	Tony Award	Best Featured Actor in a Play	Jason Robards	Nominated
1957	Tony Award	Best Direction	José Quintero	Nominated
1957	Tony Award	Best Stage Technician	Thomas Fitzgerald	Nominated
1957	Outer Critics Circle Award	Outstanding Play		Won
1957	New York Drama Critics' Circle Award	Best American Play	Eugene O'Neill	Won
1957	Theatre World Award		Jason Robards	Won
1957	Theatre World Award		Bradford Dillman	Won
1957	Pulitzer Prize	Drama	Eugene O'Neill	Won

=== 1986 Broadway revival ===
Year	Award ceremony	Category	Nominee	Result
1986	Tony Award	Best Actor in a Play	Jack Lemmon	Nominated
1986	Tony Award	Best Featured Actor in a Play	Peter Gallagher	Nominated
1986	Tony Award	Best Featured Actress in a Play	Bethel Leslie	Nominated
1986	Tony Award	Best Direction of a Play	Jonathan Miller	Nominated
1986	Drama Desk Award	Outstanding Revival		Nominated
1986	Drama Desk Award	Outstanding Actor in a Play	Jack Lemmon	Nominated
1986	Drama Desk Award	Outstanding Director of a Play	Jonathan Miller	Nominated

=== 1988 Broadway revival ===
Year	Award ceremony	Category	Nominee	Result
1989	Drama Desk Award	Outstanding Revival		Nominated
1989	Drama Desk Award	Outstanding Actress in a Play	Colleen Dewhurst	Nominated
1989	Drama Desk Award	Outstanding Lighting Design	Jennifer Tipton	Won

=== 2003 Broadway revival ===
Year	Award ceremony	Category	Nominee	Result
2003	Tony Award	Best Revival of a Play		Won
2003	Tony Award	Best Actor in a Play	Brian Dennehy	Won
2003	Tony Award	Best Actress in a Play	Vanessa Redgrave	Won
2003	Tony Award	Best Featured Actor in a Play	Philip Seymour Hoffman	Nominated
2003	Tony Award	Best Featured Actor in a Play	Robert Sean Leonard	Nominated
2003	Tony Award	Best Direction of a Play	Robert Falls	Nominated
2003	Tony Award	Best Scenic Design	Santo Loquasto	Nominated
2003	Drama Desk Award	Outstanding Revival of a Play		Won
2003	Drama Desk Award	Outstanding Actor in a Play	Brian Dennehy	Nominated
2003	Drama Desk Award	Outstanding Actor in a Play	Philip Seymour Hoffman	Nominated
2003	Drama Desk Award	Outstanding Actress in a Play	Vanessa Redgrave	Won
2003	Drama Desk Award	Outstanding Director of a Play	Robert Falls	Won
2003	Drama League Award	Distinguished Revival of a Play		Nominated

=== 2016 Broadway revival ===
Year	Award ceremony	Category	Nominee	Result
2016	Tony Award	Best Revival of a Play		Nominated
2016	Tony Award	Best Actor in a Play	Gabriel Byrne	Nominated
2016	Tony Award	Best Actress in a Play	Jessica Lange	Won
2016	Tony Award	Best Featured Actor in a Play	Michael Shannon	Nominated
2016	Tony Award	Best Direction of a Play	Jonathan Kent	Nominated
2016	Tony Award	Best Costume Design of a Play	Jane Greenwood	Nominated
2016	Tony Award	Best Lighting Design of a Play	Natasha Katz	Won
2016	Drama Desk Award	Outstanding Revival of a Play		Nominated
2016	Drama Desk Award	Outstanding Actress in a Play	Jessica Lange	Won
2016	Drama Desk Award	Outstanding Featured Actor in a Play	Michael Shannon	Won
2016	Outer Critics Circle Award	Outstanding Revival of a Play		Won
2016	Outer Critics Circle Award	Outstanding Actor in a Play	Gabriel Byrne	Nominated
2016	Outer Critics Circle Award	Outstanding Actress in a Play	Jessica Lange	Won
2016	Outer Critics Circle Award	Outstanding Featured Actor in a Play	Michael Shannon	Won
2016	Outer Critics Circle Award	Outstanding Lighting Design	Natasha Katz	Nominated
2016	Drama League Award	Distinguished Revival of a Play		Nominated
