= Peter Donaldson (actor) =

Canadian actor

- Born: Peter Thomas Donaldson; 29 October 1953; Midland, Ontario, Canada
- Died: 8 January 2011 (aged 57); Toronto, Ontario, Canada
- Occupation: Actor
- Years active: 1977–2010
- Spouse: Sheila McCarthy (m. 1986)
- Children: 2

Peter Thomas Donaldson (29 October 1953 – 8 January 2011) was a Canadian actor.

== Early life and education ==
Donaldson was the son of Betty and Norman Donaldson, and was born and raised in Midland, Ontario. While attending Midland Secondary School, he performed in Brigadoon and an abridged version of Romeo and Juliet. He attended plays at the Stratford Festival during his youth, which fueled his enthusiasm for acting.

Donaldson attended Trent University and graduated from the University of Guelph. He also later studied with Uta Hagen, Stella Adler and Olympia Dukakis in New York.

== Career ==
He began his acting career in 1975 with a summer stock company formed with fellow Guelph students that played Muskoka resorts. He subsequently worked as a stage carpenter and scene painter in Toronto.

Donaldson was known for his stage work in Shakespearean roles, particularly at the Stratford Festival in Stratford, Ontario. He unsuccessfully auditioned for the festival in 1975, but was hired years later by artistic director Robin Phillips, making his debut in Romeo and Juliet in 1977. He subsequently spent 24 seasons at the festival. Highlights of his career included his 2004 performance in Timon of Athens, as well as roles in To Kill a Mockingbird, The Seagull, Who's Afraid of Virginia Woolf?. His performance of Jamie in Long Day's Journey Into Night at Stratford in 1995 was widely praised. Toronto critic Richard Ouzounian later noted that "Of all the fine actors I've ever seen in the part, only Donaldson gave us the charm as well as the pathos, the hope as well as the despair". He received a Genie award for this performance when it was filmed by David Wellington in 1996 for the film adaptation Long Day's Journey into Night. He also worked at the Shaw Festival, and in London as part of Robin Phillips' repertory company at the Grand Theatre.

Donaldson appeared in two CBC television series based on L.M. Montgomery books. He played Ian Bowles in Emily of New Moon and Reverend Leonard in Road to Avonlea. He also appeared in the TV series Little Mosque on the Prairie and Murdoch Mysteries. In the late 1990s, he also co-starred in the Atom Egoyan film The Sweet Hereafter and played John Adams in the six-part 1997 PBS television documentary Liberty! The American Revolution.

== Personal life ==
He met actress Sheila McCarthy in 1983 while working in theatre in London, Ontario, and they were married in December 1986 in Stratford. The couple had two daughters.

In 2009, Donaldson was diagnosed with lung cancer, and while undergoing treatment continued to rehearse and perform as an actor. He would often have chemotherapy in the morning and work in the evenings. Writer George F. Walker said, "He had such great energy – he never made you feel like he needed special treatment". Roles during this period included acclaimed performances in Glengarry Glen Ross at the Soulpepper Theatre, 'Art' at Canadian Stage and Walker's And So It Goes at Factory Theatre. Donaldson died of lung cancer at Princess Margaret Hospital in Toronto at the age of 57. The director of the Stratford Festival, Antoni Cimolino, described Donaldson as "the finest actor's actor. He was deeply admired for the conviction he brought to his work and the unsparing truth of his portrayals. He was versatile and able to give outstanding performances in modern plays, musicals and classics. But his home was Shakespeare."
