= James O'Neill (actor, born 1847) =

American actor (1847–1920)

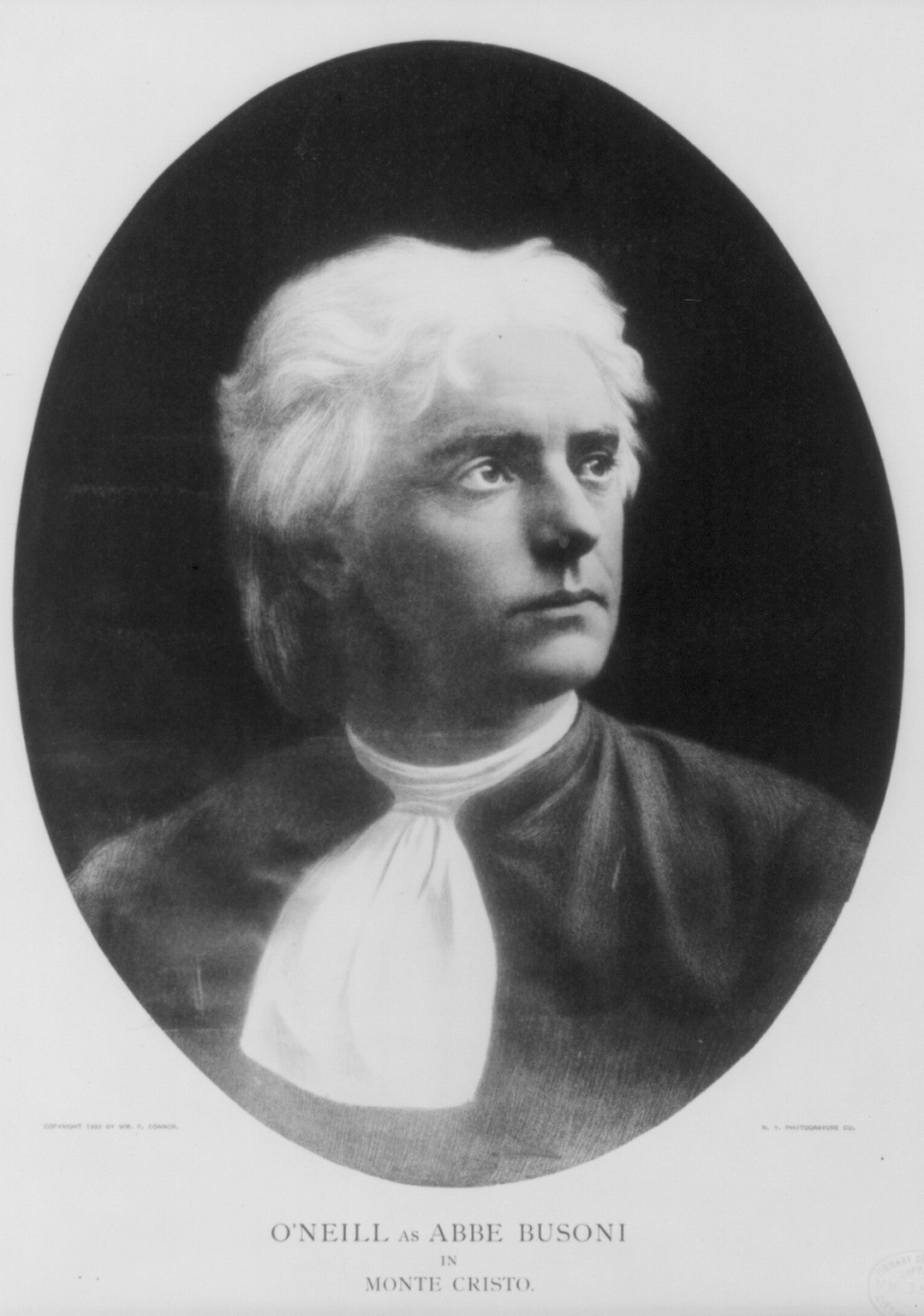
- O'Neill as Abbé Busoni in Monte Cristo, 1893
- Born: November 15, 1847; Kilkenny, Ireland
- Died: August 10, 1920 (aged 72); New London, Connecticut, U.S.
- Occupations: Stage, film actor
- Spouse: Mary Ellen Quinlan (m. 1877)
- Children: James Jr.; Edmund; Eugene

James O'Neill (November 15, 1847 – August 10, 1920) was an Irish-American theatre actor. He was the father of American playwright Eugene O'Neill and the inspiration for one of the primary characters in his son's play Long Day's Journey into Night.

== Early life ==
James O'Neill was born on November 15, 1847, in County Kilkenny, Ireland. His parents were distant cousins, Edward and Mary O'Neill. His father was a farmer. The family emigrated to America in 1851 and settled in Buffalo, New York. In 1857 they moved to Cincinnati, Ohio, where James was apprenticed to a machinist.

== Career ==
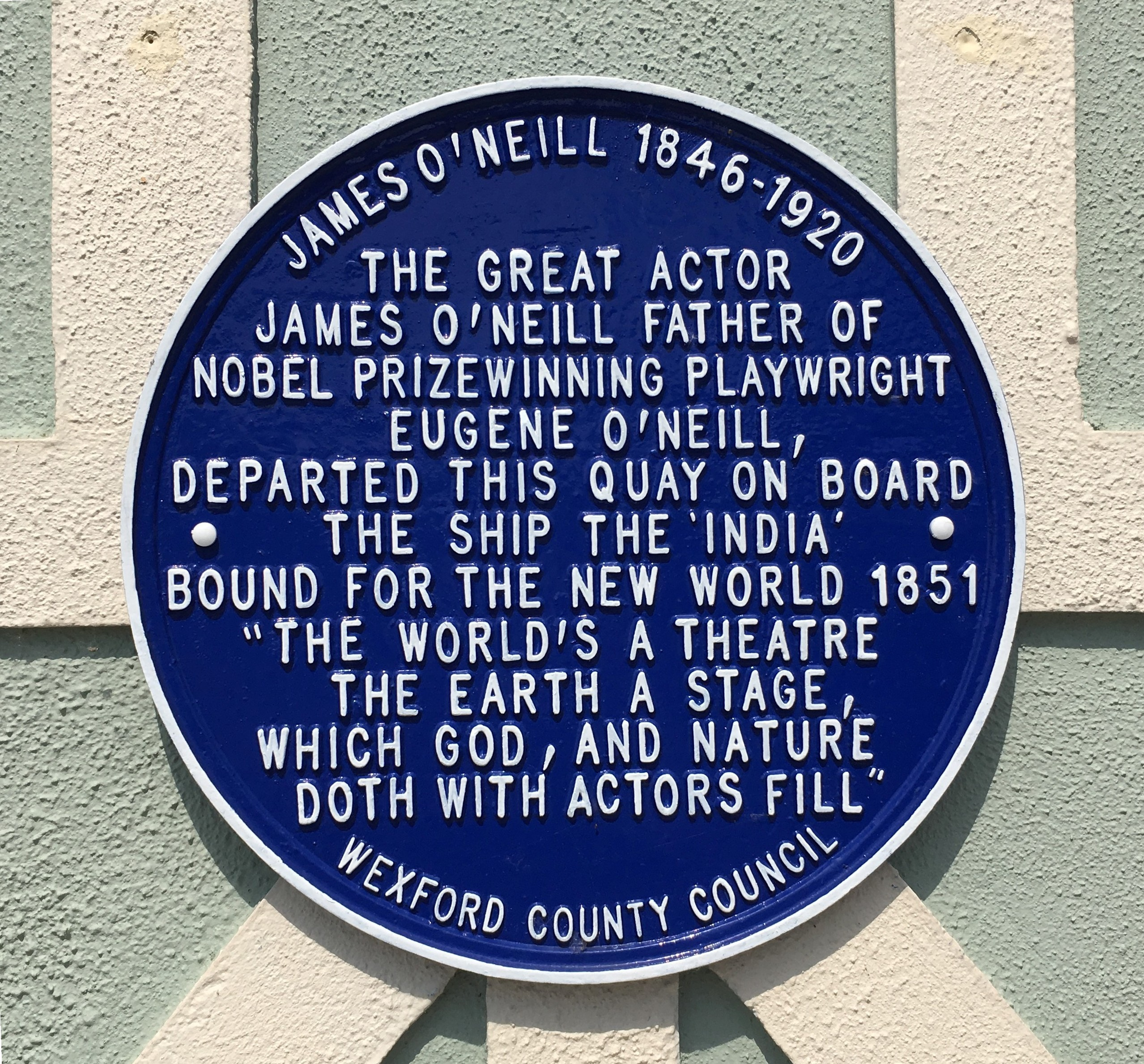
Plaque in New Ross, County Wexford recalling his emigration to America in 1851

At the age of 21, he made his stage debut in a Cincinnati, Ohio, production of Boucicault's The Colleen Bawn (1867). Also in 1867, Edwin Forrest embarked on a "farewell tour". O'Neill had a minor part in Forrest's Cincinnati production of Virginius, and then joined a travelling repertory company. He played a young sailor in Joseph Jefferson's Rip Van Winkle and for the first time found his brogue a handicap. He also played Macduff to Edwin Booth's Macbeth.

In 1874, he played the titular role in Othello in Chicago, trading off with the famous actor Edwin Booth. Casting O'Neill, who was called Black Irish because of his black hair, has been marked as one possible origin of disputes about whether the character Othello was meant to merely to have black hair and dark features, rather than to be of sub-Saharan African origin.

The San Francisco Chronicle of August 3, 1879, described James O'Neill as "...a quiet gentleman of medium height, well-proportioned figure, square shoulders and stands very erect. He has black hair, black eyes, rather dark complexion, a black mustache, and a fine set of teeth which he knows how to display to advantage." "

While in San Francisco, O'Neill became friends with fellow actor, John Elitch. When Elitch opened the Elitch Zoological Gardens in Denver, Colorado, on May 1, 1890, O'Neill attended the opening and promised "I'll come back and play on that stage whenever you say." On May 30, 1897, O'Neill kept his promise and appeared in the opening play, Helene, by Martha Morton.

He was considered a promising actor, quickly working his way up the ranks to become a matinee idol.

== Scandal ==
In 1874 O'Neill joined Richard M. Hooley's company, and the following year toured San Francisco, Virginia City and Sacramento. He then headed back east to join the Union Square Company.

On June 14, 1877, while in New York, James O'Neill married Mary Ellen Quinlan, daughter of Thomas and Bridget Quinlan, at St. Ann's Church on 12th Street. James and Ella had three sons: James (b. 1878), Edmund (b. 1883) and Eugene O'Neill (b. 1888). While James was on tour, Ella often accompanied him, and the boys were placed in boarding school. In the fall of 1877, three months after James' marriage, a woman by the name of Nettie Walsh sued O'Neill, claiming that O'Neill already married her, when she was 15, and he was the father of her three-year-old son.

The couple was in San Francisco on September 10, 1878, when their first son, James O'Neill Jr. was born in the home of one of O'Neill's friends. While in San Francisco, O'Neill took on the role of Christ in David Belasco's production The Passion for which Belasco rounded up 100 nursing mothers to appear in the tableau "the Massacre of the Innocents". The Board of Supervisors passed a local ordinance prohibiting "profane" dramas, and O'Neill and the rest of the company were arrested. O'Neill pleaded guilty and paid a $50 fine for himself and $5 for each of his co-defendants. About October 30, 1880, O'Neill and his family took a train back to New York where he re-joined the Union Square Company.

== The Count of Monte Cristo ==
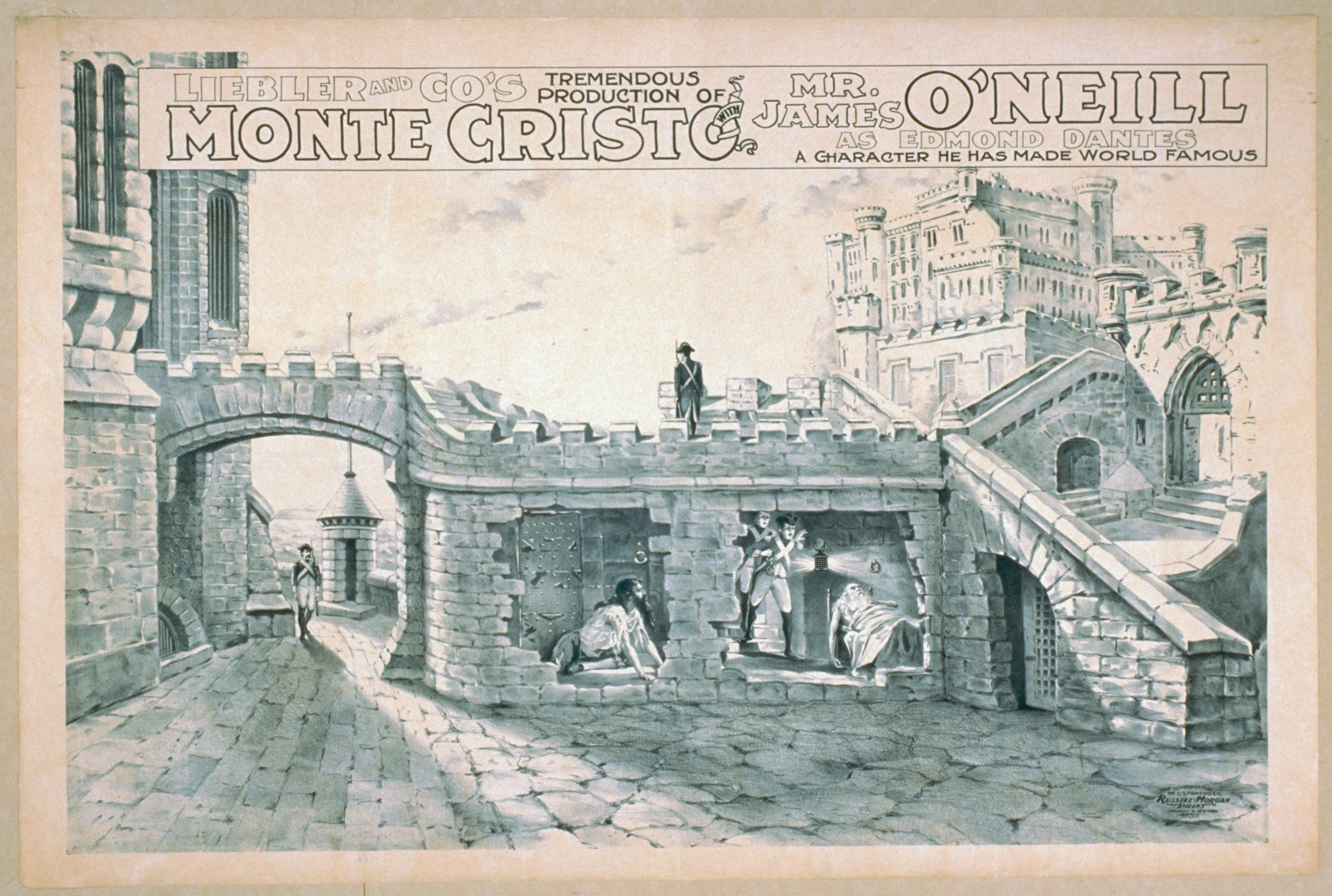
Poster for a 1900 theatre production of Monte Cristo, adapted for the stage by Charles Fechter, starring James O'Neill

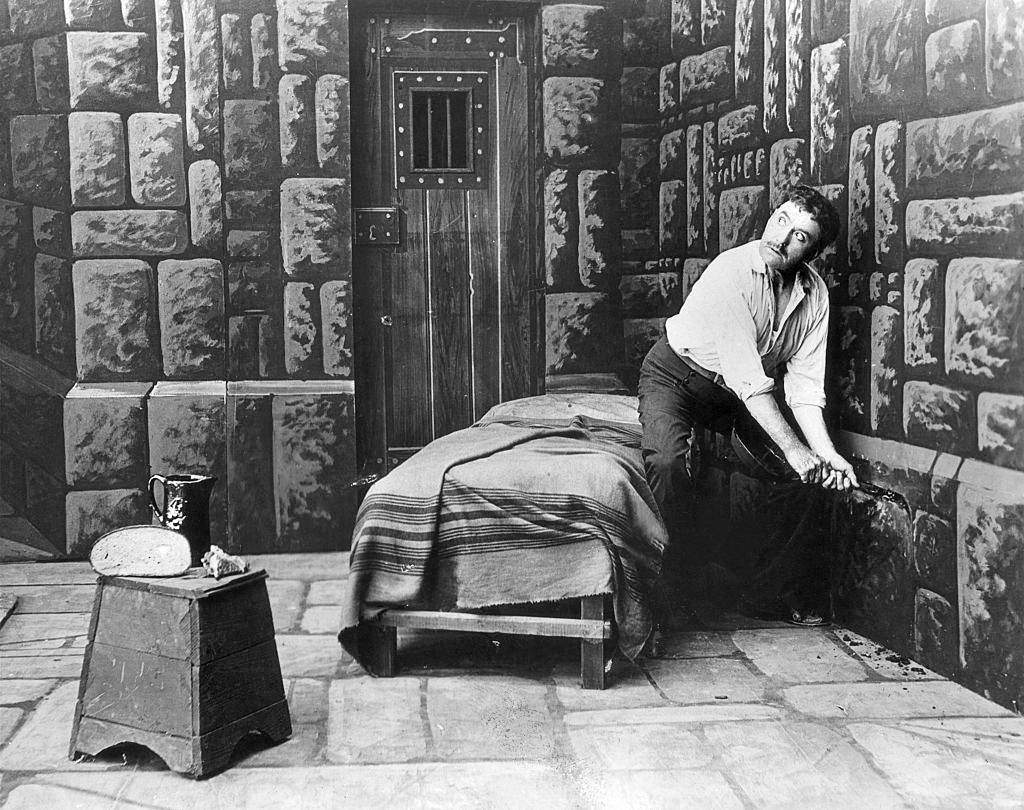
Edmond Dantès (James O'Neill) loosens a stone before making his escape from the Château d'If in The Count of Monte Cristo (1913)

As early as 1875, while a stock star at Hooley's Theatre in Chicago, O'Neill played the title role in a stage adaptation of Dumas' The Count of Monte Cristo. In early 1883 O'Neill took over the lead role in Monte Cristo at Booth's Theater in New York, after Charles R. Towne died suddenly in the wings after his first performance. O'Neill's interpretation of the part caused a sensation with the theater-going public. A company was immediately set up to take the play on tour. O'Neill bought the rights to the play. The San Francisco News Latter was less appreciative of O'Neill, saying on December 31, 1887 "In his hands the romantic story has degenerated into an extravagant melodrama. ...He is reaping the pecuniary profit of his business sagacity, but it is at the cost of art."

O'Neill soon had enough of the Count. His lines came out by rote and his performances became lackadaisical. He tried other plays but The Three Musketeers and Julius Caesar met with indifferent response, and O'Neill was forced to return to Monte Cristo in order to recoup the losses sustained in "artistic successes". Monte Cristo remained a popular favorite and would continue to make its appearance on tour as regular as clockwork. O'Neill could not afford to sacrifice wealth in the face of a growing family. His son Eugene was born in New York on October 16, 1888.

He went on to play this role over 6000 times. Some, including Eugene, saw O'Neill's willingness to play the role so many times as selling out; squandering the potential of his art in order to make money. By 1887, The San Francisco Morning Call estimated O'Neill's fortune at a quarter of a million dollars. In March 1894, O'Neill took on the role of Shane O'Neill in the play The Prince of Ulster.

According to his son, Eugene,

My father was really a remarkable actor, but the enormous success of "Monte Cristo" kept him from doing other things. He could go out year after year and clear fifty thousand in a season. He thought that he simply couldn't afford to do anything else. But in his later years he was full of bitter regrets. He felt "Monte Cristo" had ruined his career as an artist.

The company toured as far west at St. Louis; Eugene O'Neill who had given up his studies at Princeton, was the assistant treasurer. He left the company to begin his wanderings at sea. O'Neill converted "Monte Cristo" into tabloid form for the vaudeville circuit to accommodate changing taste in theater entertainment.

O'Neill's celebrity and identification with Monte Cristo led Adolph Zukor to engage O'Neill in 1912 to appear in a feature film version of the play as the first production of his Famous Players Film Company. By that time O'Neill had been continuously playing the part for nearly 40 years and was 65 years old. Directed and photographed by Edwin S. Porter and co-starring Nance O'Neil as Mercedes, the film was initially held back in release but finally appeared in late 1913.

== Death ==
In mid-1920, James was struck by an automobile in New York City and taken to Lawrence + Memorial Hospital in New London, Connecticut. He died, aged 72, on August 11, 1920, from intestinal cancer, at the family summer home, the Monte Cristo Cottage in Connecticut. His funeral at St. Joseph's Church was attended by, among others, O'Neill's sister, Mrs. M. Platt of St. Louis and Edward D. White, Chief Justice of the United States Supreme Court. O'Neill was buried in St. Mary's cemetery.

== Legacy ==
James O'Neill later became the model for James Tyrone, the tightwad, mercurial, insensitive father character in Eugene O'Neill's posthumously published autobiographical play Long Day's Journey into Night, which tells the story of the Tyrone family, which closely resembles the O'Neill family.
