= Long Day's Journey into Night (ITV Sunday Night Theatre) =

- ITV Sunday Night Theatre episode
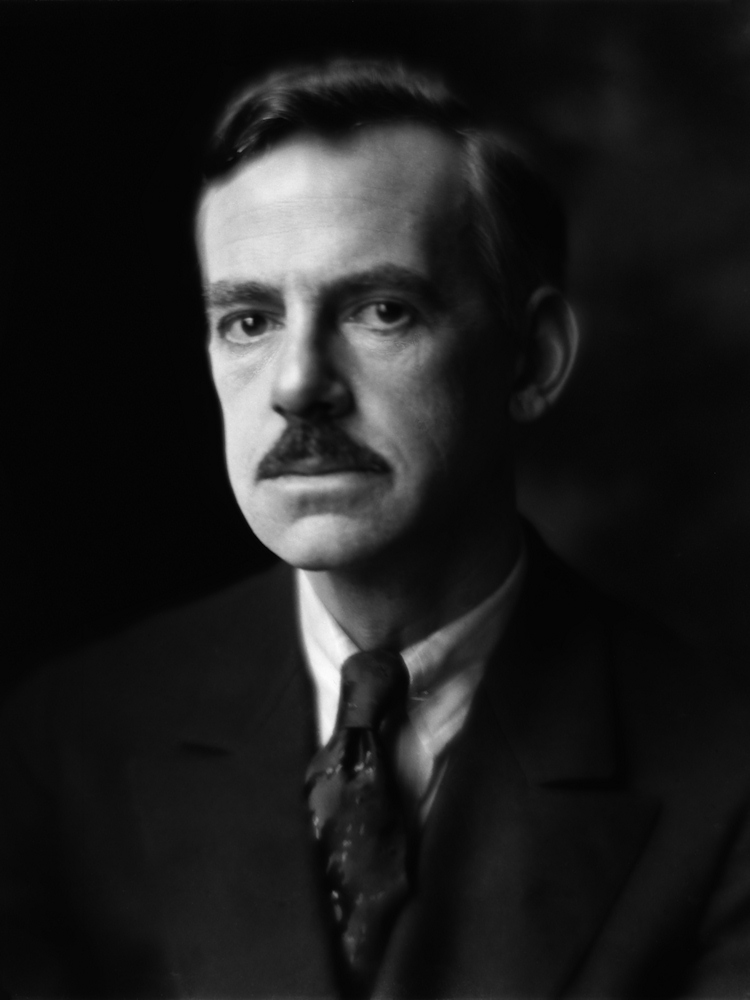
- Eugene O'Neill
- Episode no.: Series 5 Episode 20
- Directed by: Peter Wood
- Written by: Michael Blakemore
- Based on: Long Day's Journey Into Night by Eugene O'Neill
- Original air date: 10 March 1973
- Running time: 161 minutes

"Long Day's Journey Into Night" is a 1973 videotaped television adaptation of Eugene O'Neill's 1956 play of the same name. It was written by Michael Blakemore and directed Peter Wood with Cecil Clarke as executive producer. The recording is a version of Royal National Theatre's 1971 staging of the play, and features Laurence Olivier (Tyrone), Constance Cummings (Mary), Denis Quilley (Jamie), Ronald Pickup (Edmund), and Maureen Lipman (Cathleen).

== Plot ==
The play follows one day in the lives of the Tyrone family, each member is troubled and has been damaged by alcohol or other drugs. They have issues with each other that lead to fights and an inability to reconcile with one another.

== Cast and characters ==
- Laurence Olivier - James Tyrone Sr.
- Constance Cummings - Mary Tyrone
- Denis Quilley - James Tyrone Jr. ("Jamie")
- Ronald Pickup - Edmund Tyrone
- Maureen Lipman - Cathleen

== Productions ==
Olivier had often been asked to take on the role of Tyrone, but was relctuant to take the part of the ageing actor as he felt there were too many traps that would lead to the role being a stereotype of himself as an actor. His concerns proved unfounded and the play was a critical and commercial hit that revived the fortunes of the National Theatre.

== Award and nominations ==
At the 25th Primetime Emmy Awards, Olivier won for the Outstanding Single Performance by an Actor in a Leading Role, and the production was nominated for the Outstanding Single Program - Drama or Comedy. Olivier was also nominated for the British Academy Television Award for Best Actor.
