= Monte Cristo Cottage =

Historic house in Connecticut, United States

- Monte Cristo Cottage (Eugene O'Neill Summer House)
- U.S. National Register of Historic Places
- U.S. National Historic Landmark
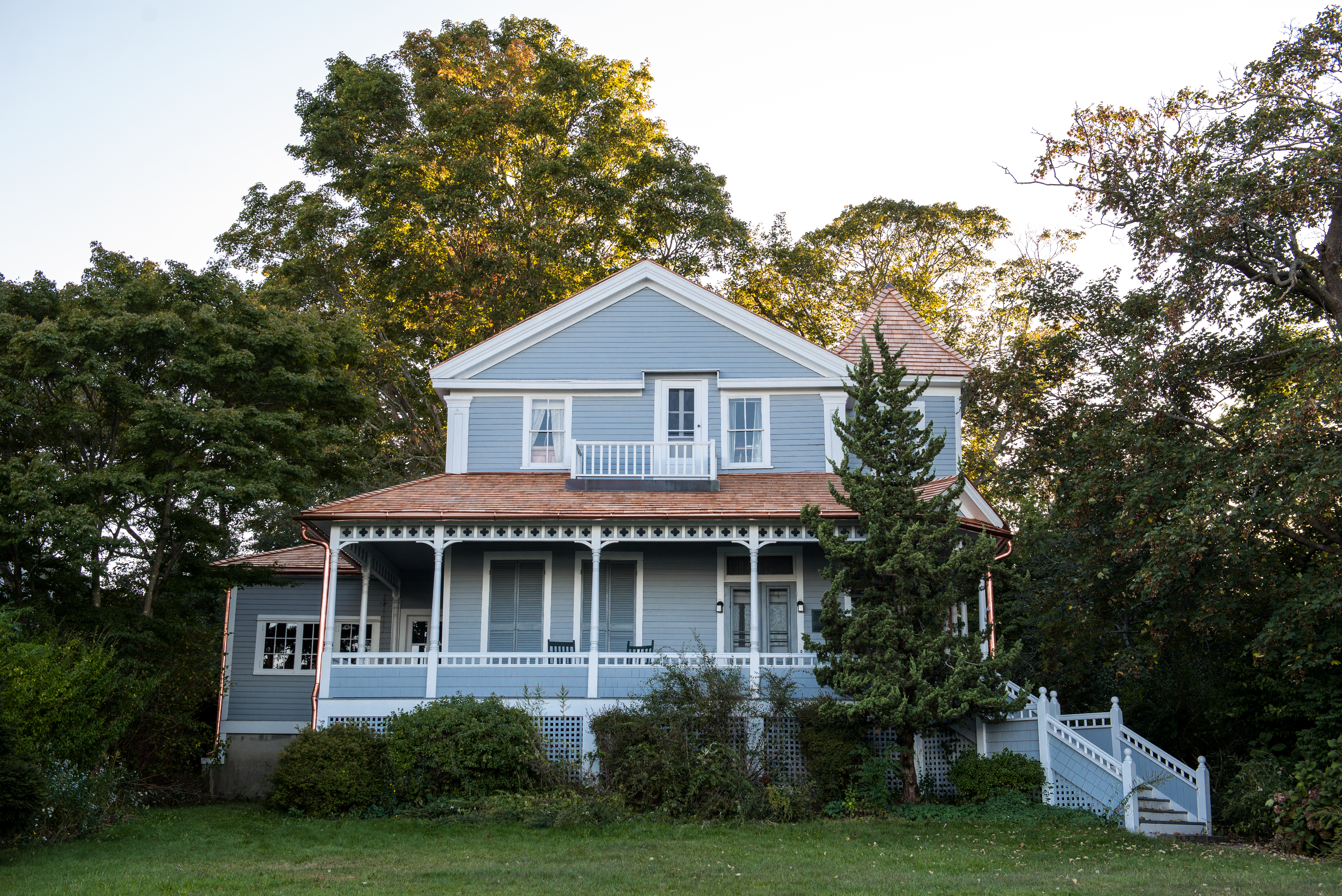
- The home in 2018

- Location within Connecticut Location within the United States
- Interactive map showing the location of Monte Cristo Cottage
- Location: 325 Pequot Avenue, New London, Connecticut
- Coordinates: 41°19′55″N 72°5′46.5″W
- Built: 1888
- Architectural style: Stick/Eastlake, Queen Anne
- NRHP reference No.: 71001010

Significant dates
- Added to NRHP: July 17, 1971
- Designated NHL: July 17, 1971

Monte Cristo Cottage (also known as Eugene O'Neill Summer House) was the summer home of American actor James O'Neill and his family, notably his son Eugene O'Neill. It is a National Historic Landmark located at 325 Pequot Avenue in New London, Connecticut.

== History ==
James O'Neill came to New London, Connecticut in June 1884 and purchased two plots of land on Pequot Avenue for his wife Ella's 27th birthday. The property included a cottage built in the 1840s which he expanded. It is now a two-story house, three bays wide with a porch that wraps around the front to the north side. A tower with pyramidal roof stands just beyond the porch on the north side. It was the principal family residence during Eugene O'Neill's childhood.

As a child, Eugene spent much of the year traveling with his actor father touring from city to city, but the family returned to this cottage each summer. It was named for the play in which his father starred in touring productions for many years. O'Neill probably wrote his first two plays here, and it is the setting of his plays Ah, Wilderness! and Long Day's Journey into Night, the latter posthumously winning him the 1957 Pulitzer Prize for Drama.

== Recent history ==
The house was declared a National Historic Landmark in 1971 for its association with O'Neill. The Eugene O'Neill Theater Center purchased it in 1976 and operates it as a historic house museum, furnished to appear as it might have for the setting of Long Day's Journey into Night. The house also features exhibits about O'Neill's life and works, as well as artifacts and memorabilia, including the desk which he used to write his drama Anna Christie which won him the Pulitzer Prize.

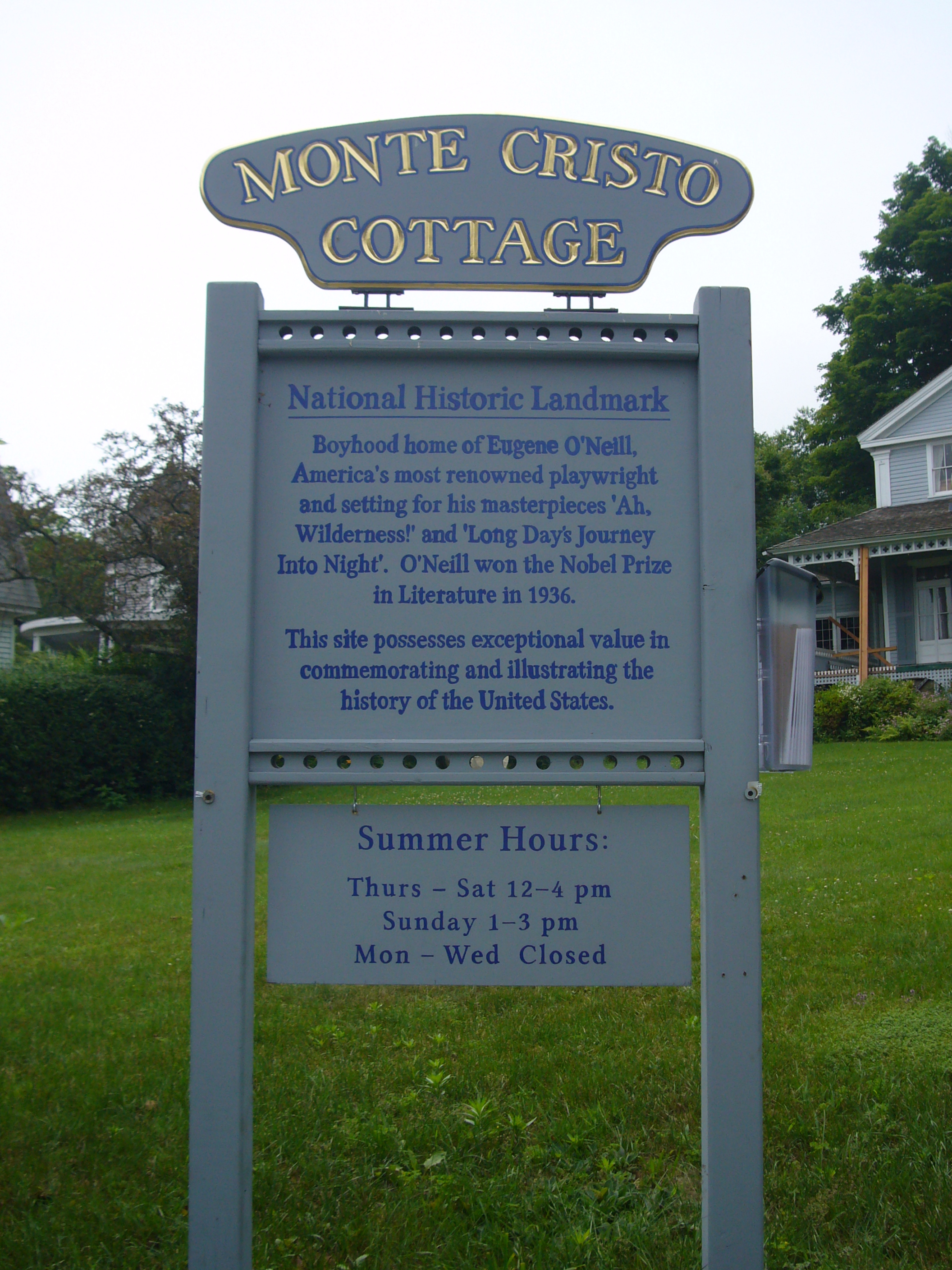
Sign at the cottage

== See also ==
- List of National Historic Landmarks in Connecticut
- National Register of Historic Places listings in New London County, Connecticut
