= Ella O'Neill =

Mother of playwright Eugene O'Neill

- Born: Mary Ellen Quinlan; August 13, 1857; New Haven, Connecticut, U.S.
- Died: February 28, 1922 (aged 64)
- Spouse: James O'Neill (m. 1877; died 1920)
- Children: James Jr.; Edmund; Eugene

Mary Ellen Quinlan; known as Ella O'Neill (August 13, 1857 – February 28, 1922) was the mother of playwright Eugene O'Neill and wife of actor James O'Neill. She was the inspiration for many of Eugene O'Neill's stories.

== Life ==
She was born in New Haven, Connecticut, the daughter of Bridget (née Lundigan) and Thomas Quinlan, both Irish immigrants from County Tipperary. Mary Ellen grew up in Cleveland, Ohio. Mary Ellen attended the Ursuline Academy on Euclid Avenue. Starting at age 15, in 1872, she attended St. Mary's Academy which would later become St. Mary's College in Notre Dame, Indiana. She graduated in 1875 with honors in music, playing Chopin's Polonaise for piano, op. 22, at the commencement.

Ella met James O'Neill at her father's house, and later married him on June 14, 1877 in Manhattan.

Ella was on tour with James in San Francisco when in September 1878, her first son, James, Jr., was born in the house of one of the actor's friends.

A second son, Edmund Burke O'Neill was born in 1883 in St. Louis. In late winter 1885, Ella left her sons with her mother in New York to be with James O'Neill while he was traveling in Denver. While she was away, both of her children contacted measles, and Edmund died in 1886. Ella blamed herself and James, Jr., whom she believed gave Edmund the virus. Another son, Eugene O'Neill, was born in October 1888. Ella was administered morphine while giving birth and became addicted to it, which she was cured of in 1914. Her husband died in August 1920, and she died of a brain tumor on February 28, 1922.

== In popular culture ==
Ella O'Neill later became the model for Mary Tyrone in Eugene O'Neill's final work Long Day's Journey Into Night, which tells the story of the Tyrone family, who closely resemble the members of Eugene's family. This character says the famous line "Something I need terribly. I remember when I had it I was never lonely nor afraid. I can't have lost it forever, I would die if I thought that. Because then there would be no hope."
