= The Carpenter (film) =

- Film poster
- Directed by: David Wellington
- Written by: Doug Taylor
- Produced by: Pierre Grise
- Starring: Pierre Lenoir; Lynne Adams; Wings Hauser; Beverly Murray; Barbara Ann Jones
- Cinematography: David Franco
- Edited by: Roland Pollack
- Music by: Pierre Bundock
- Production company: Gold-Gems Ltd.
- Distributed by: Cineglobe
- Release date: August 27, 1988 (Montréal World Film Festival)
- Running time: 89 minutes
- Country: Canada
- Language: English
- Budget: $350,000

The Carpenter is a 1988 Canadian supernatural horror film directed by David Wellington, written by Doug Taylor, and starring Pierre Lenoir, Lynne Adams, and Wings Hauser. Its plot follows a woman recently released from a psychiatric hospital who finds herself haunted by the ghost of a murderous carpenter in the home she and her husband are renovating.

== Plot ==
After being released from the institution in Québec where she was placed in due to suffering a mental breakdown, housewife Alice Jarett relocates to another part of Canada with her husband Martin, a professor. The house the couple moves into was never finished, so Martin hires a cheap construction crew to complete it. One night, Alice is awakened by hammering in the basement, caused by a carpenter she had not seen with the rest of the crew. Unlike the other workers, this one has a pleasant demeanor and good work ethic, and while Martin is away one night, he stops another carpenter from trying to rape Alice by cutting the man's arms off with a circular saw, sending the dazed Alice back to bed, and cleaning up the mess afterward.

Alice has a few more run-ins with the carpenter, and comes to the conclusion that he is the spirit of the house's builder, a man named Edward who was executed for killing several repo men when his obsession with perfecting his home caused him to incur massive debt. Despite Ed's murderous past, Alice finds herself falling for his charms, even after witnessing him murder two disgruntled former workers who break into the house to loot it.

One day, a student of Martin named Laura Bell shows up at the house to confess to Alice she and Martin are having an affair, and that she is pregnant with his child. An argument breaks out between Laura and Alice, who uses a nail gun to kill Laura with help from Ed. When Martin returns home and discovers Laura's mangled body, he attacks Alice, but is subdued and has his head crushed in a vise by Ed. Sometime later, Alice's sister Rachel drops by, and tries to leave with Alice after spotting Martin and Laura's bodies, but she is stopped by Ed, who gets violent with her. Angered by Ed harming her sister, Alice turns against him, and the two fight. During the scuffle, Alice realizes that damaging the house hurts Ed, so she starts a fire with a blow torch. As the flames spread through the house, Alice and a recovered Rachel flee, being briefly chased by Ed before he burns away.

== Cast ==
- Wings Hauser as Edward Byrd
- Lynne Adams as Alice Jarett
- Pierre Lenoir as Martin Jarett
- Barbara Ann Jones as Rachel
- Louise-Marie Mennier as Laura Bell
- Johnny Cuthbert as Roland
- Robert Austern as Barns
- Anthony Ulc as Landis
- Bob Pot as Barry Farnsworth
- Richard Jutras as Mr. Mort
- Ron Lea as Sheriff Jonah "J.J." Johnston
- Beverly Murray as Crazy Woman
- Griffith Brewer as Doctor Flanders
- Anne Farquhar as Nurse
- David Gow as Larry
- Theresa Jutras as Bleeding Woman
- Nancy Brayman as Real Estate Agent

== Reception ==
DVD Talk gave The Carpenter three stars out of five, opening its review with "Even by the admittedly low standards of the slasher film, The Carpenter is goofy. Not just in premise, mind you, but in execution as well. Goofy, however, can also be fun which is absolutely the case with this low budget horror film". Despite deeming the finale weak, DVD Verdict also enjoyed the film, writing that it was "filled with quirky characters, and this—at least for me—is why The Carpenter works. As a horror film, it's pretty silly (as is the wont of horror films) but it proceeds with a logic dictated by its characters that makes it far more interesting and entertaining than the usual slasher pic". Oh, the Horror! had a mixed reaction to the film (which they described as being "like Ghost if Swayze were psychotic") and concluded "I can somewhat recommend it, if only because some moments are absurdly brilliant".

The website Alternate Ending praised The Carpenter's originality and energy.

== Home media ==
The film was released on DVD by Scorpion Releasing on November 11, 2011. The only special features it contained were an optional intro and epilogue by Katarina Waters. Vinegar Syndrome released the film on Blu-ray on February 25, 2025.

== Bibliography ==
- Borseti, Francesco (2016). It Came from the 80s!: Interviews with 124 Cult Filmmakers. McFarland & Company, Inc., Publishers. ISBN 978-1-4766-6604-4.
