= Contact (Saving Hope) =

- Saving Hope episode
- Dr Alex Reid deals with a kid, Cal, who has a disease.
- Episode no.: Season 1 Episode 2
- Written by: Morwyn Brebner
- Original air date: June 14, 2012

Episode chronology
← Previous "Pilot"	Next → "Blindness"

"Contact" is the second episode of the first season of the Canadian supernatural medical drama television series Saving Hope. The episode premiered on June 14, 2012 in Canada on CTV, and was simultaneously broadcast on NBC in the United States.

== Plot ==
The show centers on Dr. Alex Reid (Erica Durance), the chief surgical resident at Hope Zion Hospital, who is involved in a car accident with her fiance, Dr Charles Harris (Michael Shanks). Minutes later, Charlie falls into a coma. In this episode, Alex deals with a child, Cal, who has a disease. He goes into a coma, and meets Charlie. Charlie asks him to send a message to Alex for him, when Cal wakes up. Despite this, the boy forgets Charlie's name. Charlie's ex-wife suggests in-coma arousal therapy. Meanwhile, surgeons Joel Goran (Daniel Gillies) and Maggie Lin (Julia Taylor Ross) deal with a lady who will die without surgery. Due to their religion, her husband refuses treatment.

== Reception ==
"Contact" received mixed reviews from television critics. Commentators noted that parts were good, and parts weren't. They also noted that it raised many questions, and that it was better than "Pilot", the previous episode. Upon airing, the episode garnered 1.6 million viewers in Canada, according to BBM Canada. It obtained 3.98 million viewers and 0.7 rating in the 18–49 demographic, in the United States, according to Nielsen ratings.
