= Pilot (Saving Hope) =

- Saving Hope episode
- Episode no.: Season 1 Episode 1
- Directed by: David Wellington
- Written by: Malcom MacRury; Morwyn Brebner
- Original air date: June 7, 2012

Episode chronology
← Previous —	Next → "Contact"

"Pilot" is the first episode of the supernatural medical drama television series Saving Hope. The episode premiered on June 7, 2012, in Canada on CTV, and was simultaneously broadcast on NBC in the United States.

== Synopsis ==
In the episode, surgeon Alex Reid (Erica Durance) and her fiancé Charles Harris (Michael Shanks) are involved in a car accident while on the way to their wedding. Minutes later, Charles falls into a coma. He now experiences life "hoping" that he will survive.

== Production ==
The episode was written by series creators Malcom MacRury and Morwyn Brebner, and directed by David Wellington. MacRury had previously created Cra$h & Burn for the Global Television Network, and Brebner had previously created Rookie Blue also for the Global Television Network. Principal photography for the pilot installment commenced in Toronto, Ontario, Canada.

== Reception ==
"Pilot" received mixed reviews from television critics. Commentators noted that it is similar to Grey's Anatomy, that "hope" nearly pulls off, and adulated the performances of various cast members. Upon airing, the episode garnered 1.52 million viewers in Canada, debuting at #1 in the country, and 3.124 million viewers in the United States with a 0.7 rating in the 18–49 demographic, according to Nielsen ratings.
