= Long Day's Journey into Night (1996 film) =

- Directed by: David Wellington
- Screenplay by: Eugene O'Neill
- Based on: Long Day's Journey into Night by Eugene O'Neill
- Produced by: Daniel Iron; Niv Fichman; Sheena Macdonald; Barbara Willis Sweete; Jac Venza; Larry Weinstein
- Starring: William Hutt; Martha Henry; Peter Donaldson; Tom McCamus; Martha Burns
- Cinematography: David Franco
- Edited by: Susan Shipton
- Music by: Ron Sures
- Production company: Rhombus Media
- Release date: September 6, 1996 (TIFF)
- Running time: 173 minutes
- Country: Canada
- Language: English

Long Day's Journey into Night is a 1996 Canadian drama film directed by David Wellington. An adaptation of Eugene O'Neill's 1956 play of the same name, the film starred William Hutt as James, Martha Henry as Mary, Peter Donaldson as Jamie, Tom McCamus as Edmund and Martha Burns as Cathleen.

== Background ==
The same cast had performed the play at Canada's Stratford Festival from 1994 to 1996; Wellington essentially filmed the stage production without significant changes.

== Reception ==
The film swept the acting awards at the 17th Genie Awards, for Hutt as Best Actor, Henry as Best Actress, Donaldson as Best Supporting Actor and Burns as Best Supporting Actress. McCamus was also nominated for Best Actor, losing to Hutt. It was named Best Canadian Film at the 1996 Toronto International Film Festival.

The film was later aired by PBS on its Great Performances series in 1999.

== Cast ==
- William Hutt as James Tyrone
- Martha Henry as Mary Tyrone
- Tom McCamus as Edmund Tyrone
- Peter Donaldson as James Tyrone Jr.
- Martha Burns as Cathleen
