= Saving Hope =

Canadian supernatural medical drama television series

- Genre: Medical drama; Supernatural drama; Mystery; Thriller
- Created by: Malcolm MacRury; Morwyn Brebner
- Starring: Erica Durance; Michael Shanks; Daniel Gillies; Husein Madhavji; Julia Taylor Ross; Kristopher Turner; Wendy Crewson; Benjamin Ayres; Glenda Braganza; Salvatore Antonio; K. C. Collins; Joseph Pierre; Michelle Nolden; Stacey Farber; Kim Shaw
- Country of origin: Canada
- Original language: English
- No. of seasons: 5
- No. of episodes: 85 (list of episodes)

Production
- Executive producers: Ilana Frank; David Wellington; Lesley Harrison; Morwyn Brebner; Malcolm MacRury; Adam Pettle
- Producers: Linda Pope; Kathy Avrich-Johnson; Erica Durance
- Cinematography: Steve Danyluk
- Editor: Tad Seaborn
- Running time: 44 minutes
- Production companies: Ilana C. Frank Films; Entertainment One; Bell Media

Original release
- Network: CTV
- Release: June 7, 2012 – August 3, 2017

Saving Hope is a Canadian supernatural medical drama television series set in Toronto in the fictional hospital Hope Zion. The series stars Erica Durance and Michael Shanks. The show's premise originated with Malcolm MacRury and Morwyn Brebner, who are both credited as creators and executive producers. Saving Hope aired on CTV for five seasons from June 7, 2012, to August 3, 2017, with the first season airing on NBC.

== Plot ==
The protagonist of the show is Dr. Alex Reid, a doctor whose fiancé, Dr. Charles Harris, is in a coma after a car accident while on his way to their wedding.

The show follows the life of Charlie in his comatose state and Alex dealing with her patients, all the while hoping that he will survive. Dr. Reid is the Chief Surgical Resident while Dr. Harris was the Chief of Surgery until his accident. Dr. Harris recovers at the end of season 1, but in subsequent seasons he continues to be able to see the spirits of comatose and dead patients.

The show also stars Dr. Joel Goran, an orthopedic surgeon and Alex's ex-boyfriend. Reid also works along with Dr. Shahir Hamza, a neurosurgeon, Dr. Maggie Lin, a third year surgical resident on rotation in the General Surgery department, Dr. Gavin Murphy, a psychiatry resident, Dr. Zachary Miller, the ER doctor, OR nurse Victor Reis, Dr. Tom Reycraft, Dr. Melanda Tolliver and Dr. Dawn Bell, a cardiologist, who is Charlie's ex-wife.

== Cast and characters ==
=== Main ===
- Erica Durance as Dr. Alexandra "Alex" Reid: At the start of the series, Chief Surgical Resident and Charlie Harris' fiancée.
- Michael Shanks as Dr. Charles "Charlie" Harris: Chief of Surgery, orthopedic surgeon and Alex's fiancé.
- Daniel Gillies as Dr. Joel Goran: New orthopedic surgeon at Hope Zion and Alex's on-and-off boyfriend (seasons 1–3).
- Husein Madhavji as Dr. Shahir Hamza: Chief of Neurosurgery, who is highly skilled but socially awkward due to his Asperger syndrome.
- Julia Taylor Ross as Dr. Maggie Lin: A third year surgical resident on rotation in the hospital's General Surgery department and then in the OB-GYN department.
- Kristopher Turner as Dr. Gavin Murphy: A psychiatry resident and Maggie's former boyfriend (seasons 1–2; recurring season 3).
- Wendy Crewson as Dr. Dana Kinney: Chief of Plastic Surgery, who is appointed Interim Chief of Surgery following Charlie's coma (seasons 1 & 4; recurring seasons 2, 3 & 5).
- Benjamin Ayres as Dr. Zach Miller: An ER doctor.
- Glenda Braganza as Dr. Melanda Tolliver: A friend of Alex's and an ICU doctor (seasons 1–3).
- Salvatore Antonio as Victor Reis: An OR nurse and Shahir's former boyfriend (seasons 1 & 2).
- K. C. Collins as Dr. Tom Reycraft: A fourth year surgical resident, who is appointed Chief Surgical Resident in place of Alex (seasons 1 & 2; recurring season 3).
- Joseph Pierre as Jackson Wade: An ICU nurse (seasons 2–5; recurring season 1).
- Michelle Nolden as Dr. Dawn Bell: A cardiologist and Charlie's ex-wife, later chief of staff (seasons 2–5; recurring season 1).
- Stacey Farber as Dr. Sydney Katz: An OB/GYN and later Maggie's girlfriend (season 3; guest seasons 4 & 5).
- Kim Shaw as Dr. Cassie Williams: A book smart intern learning to apply the applications of medication rather than just reading about them (seasons 4–5).

=== Recurring ===
- Conrad Coates as Bryan Travers: The main executive of Hope Zion (seasons 1 & 2).
- Steve Cumyn as Dr. George Baumann: An anesthesiologist (seasons 2–4).
- Mac Fyfe as Dr. James Dey: A psychiatry resident (season 3).
- Max Bennett as Dr. Patrick Curtis: A general surgeon and surgical fellow who filled in for Alex during her maternity leave (season 4).
- Dejan Loyola as Dr. Dev Sekara: A junior resident doctor (seasons 4 & 5).
- Parveen Kaur as Dr. Asha Mirani: A junior resident doctor (season 4).
- Jess Salgueiro as Nurse Carbrera: A nurse (seasons 4 & 5).
- Nicole Underhay as Kristine Fields: A nurse in palliative care who, like Charlie, is a medium (season 4).
- Peter Mooney as Dr. Jeremy Bishop: A general surgeon and who has a past with Charlie (seasons 4 & 5).
- Allison Wilson-Forbes as Nurse Alice: A nurse who works in the ER.
- Jarod Joseph as Dr. Emanuel Palmer: A young interventional radiologist with a unique prospective and a laissez-faire attitude (season 5).
- Greg Calderone as Dr. Billy Scott: A new transfer intern and Dev's former med school rival (season 5).
- Christopher Jacot as Jonathan: Shahir's boyfriend (season 5).

== Overview ==
Season	Episodes	Originally released	
Season	Episodes	First released	Last released
1	13	June 7, 2012	September 13, 2012
2	18	June 25, 2013	February 27, 2014
3	18	September 22, 2014	February 18, 2015
4	18	September 24, 2015	February 14, 2016
5	18	March 12, 2017	August 3, 2017

The series premiered on June 7, 2012, on both CTV in Canada and NBC in the United States. On July 25, 2012, CTV ordered a second, 13-episode season for the summer of 2013. NBC, however, pulled the show's final two episodes from its broadcast schedule and made them available on their official website. On November 16, 2012, CTV announced they had increased their episode order for season 2 to eighteen episodes. On November 7, 2013, CTV ordered a third season of Saving Hope that consisted of eighteen episodes and aired in 2014. On November 10, 2014, CTV ordered a fourth season of Saving Hope that consisted of eighteen episodes, and premiered on September 24. 2015. On December 17, 2015, CTV ordered a fifth and final season of Saving Hope that consisted of 18 episodes.

In 2014, Ion Television announced that they had secured the American broadcast rights to the show.

== Home media ==
DVD title	Region 1	Region 2
The Complete First Season	July 1, 2016 (U.S.); May 21, 2013 (Canada)	October 28, 2013 (UK); November 28, 2014 (Germany)
The Complete Second Season	October 7, 2014 (Canada)	December 8, 2014 (UK); April 10, 2015 (Germany)
The Complete Third Season	September 13, 2016 (U.S.); February 9, 2016 (Canada)	October 7, 2016 (Germany)
The Complete Fourth Season	March 7, 2017 (U.S.); June 7, 2016 (Canada)	N/A
The Complete Fifth Season	October 24, 2017 (U.S. & Canada)	N/A

== Production ==
=== Conception ===
Malcolm MacRury and Morwyn Brebner devised the concept of the series. The series draws on a 3-part newspaper series, also called "Saving Hope," written by Ian Brown and published in 2005 in The Globe and Mail. MacRury had previously co-created the comedy series Republic of Doyle for CBC, while Brebner had previously co-created television drama Rookie Blue for the Global Television Network. Canadian broadcaster CTV had picked up the pilot episode in November 2011. Executive producers of the show went to Los Angeles, California, to pitch the series to U.S. broadcasters. Their efforts convinced NBC to pick up the series for airing in the United States. CTV and NBC ordered 13 episodes for the first season.

The Los Angeles Times claimed that MacRury and Brebner are trying to "combine a doctors-in-love medical soap opera modeled on Grey's Anatomy with something completely different, a paranormal ghost story with elements of A Gifted Man and Ghost Whisperer". Principal photography for the pilot episode took place in Toronto, Ontario in the spring of 2011.

== Reception ==
=== Ratings ===
In Canada, the premiere figures were the highest recorded for the summer season in 2012. The American premiere attracted 3.1 million viewers on NBC, which some critics were unimpressed with.

Season	Timeslot (ET)	Episodes	Premiered		Ended		TV Season	Viewers (millions)
Season	Timeslot (ET)	Episodes	Date	Viewers (millions)	Date	Viewers (millions)	TV Season	Viewers (millions)
1	Thursday 9:00 p.m.	13	June 7, 2012	1.52	September 13, 2012	1.55	2012–13	1.70
2	Tuesday 10:00 p.m.	18	June 25, 2013	1.08	February 27, 2014	1.68	2013–14	1.30
3	Thursday 9:00 p.m. (fall); Wednesday 9:00 p.m. (midseason)	18	September 22, 2014	1.1	February 18, 2015	—N/a	2014–15	N/A
4	Thursday 9:00 p.m.	18	September 24, 2015	1.49	February 14, 2016	1.21	2015–16	N/A
5	Sunday 10:00 p.m. (winter); Thursday 9:00 (spring)	18	March 12, 2017	0.94	August 3, 2017	N/A	2017	N/A

=== Reviews ===
Saving Hope received mixed reviews on Metacritic with a score of 49 out of 100 based on 15 critics' reviews. Verne Gay of Newsday stated the series "is modeled out of particularly sturdy, comfortable and reliable material." He added that it is "a sober, intelligent, placidly paced drama as only the Canadians can make." The Chicago Sun-Times's Lori Rackl said the series "has some fun, clever and emotion-stirring moments, but they’re handicapped by cheesy montages and one too many scenarios designed to remind us of the importance of having hope." Alan Sepinwall of HitFix called Charlie Harris' "spirit walk" around the hospital "an interesting solution to the problem of telling stories we've seen a million times before. But doing it this way ultimately does more harm than good." He added: "It's not bad so much as tired." The San Francisco Chronicle's David Wiegand called the series "a lukewarm stew of ideas from other shows... and films... with stock characters and situations that occasionally jerk a demi-tear or two, but with absolutely no authenticity. The sloppy sentimentality is cheap and unearned."

== Broadcast ==
In September 2014, the American television network Ion Television announced a partnership with eOne to have exclusive broadcast rights for current and future American television seasons. In Australia, the series premiered on SoHo on February 6, 2015.

== See also ==
- List of ghost films
- A Gifted Man
