= Peter Wood (director) =

English theatre and film director

Peter Wood (8 October 1925 – 11 February 2016) was an English theatre and film director.

== Biography ==
Wood was born on 8 October 1925 in Colyton, Devon. His father Frank Wood was a basketmaker and his mother, Lucy Eleanor (Nell), née Meeson was a seamstress. Wood developed his interest in acting while at Taunton School. After school, he spent his National Service with the RAF in Canada and on his return he studied English at Downing College, Cambridge. Wood joined an acting troupe after university, and by 1955 he was running the Oxford Playhouse. The following year, he became resident director at the London Arts Theatre, working alongside Peter Hall.

During the late 1950s, Wood directed plays at Edinburgh festival and the Old Vic before travelling to Broadway to direct Five Finger Exercise. He returned to England to direct plays at Old Vic, Globe Theatre and Theatre Royal Haymarket in the 1960s.

Amongst his early stage work was direction of Harold Pinter's debut work, The Birthday Party at the Lyric Theatre, Hammersmith, and later Joe Orton's Loot. He was also responsible for regularly directing premiere productions of plays by Tom Stoppard, from Jumpers (1972) to Hapgood (1988).

His film work included In Search of Gregory (1969) starring Julie Christie, an adaptation of Long Day's Journey into Night (1973) starring Laurence Olivier, and a television special adaptation of the Stoppard play The Dog It Was That Died (1988).

Wood lived his final years in a restored barn house at a Batcombe, Somerset and died on 11 February 2016 as a result of dementia and old age.
