= David Wellington (director) =

Canadian film and television director (born 1963)

- Born: 1963 (age 62–63)
- Occupations: Film, television director
- Known for: Long Day's Journey into Night

David Wellington (born 1963) is a Canadian film and television director, best known for the films I Love a Man in Uniform and the 1996 adaptation of Long Day's Journey into Night.

He has also directed episodes of the television series The Hidden Room, The Eleventh Hour, Queer as Folk, Saving Hope, Rookie Blue and Orphan Black.

His brother Peter is also a film and television director, who along with David, directs for Saving Hope.

== Filmography ==
- The Carpenter (1988)
- I Love a Man in Uniform (1993)
- Long Day's Journey into Night (1996)
- Of Murder and Memory (2008)
- Would Be Kings (2008)
