= Stratford Shakespeare Festival production history =

Summer theatre in Stratford, Ontario, Canada

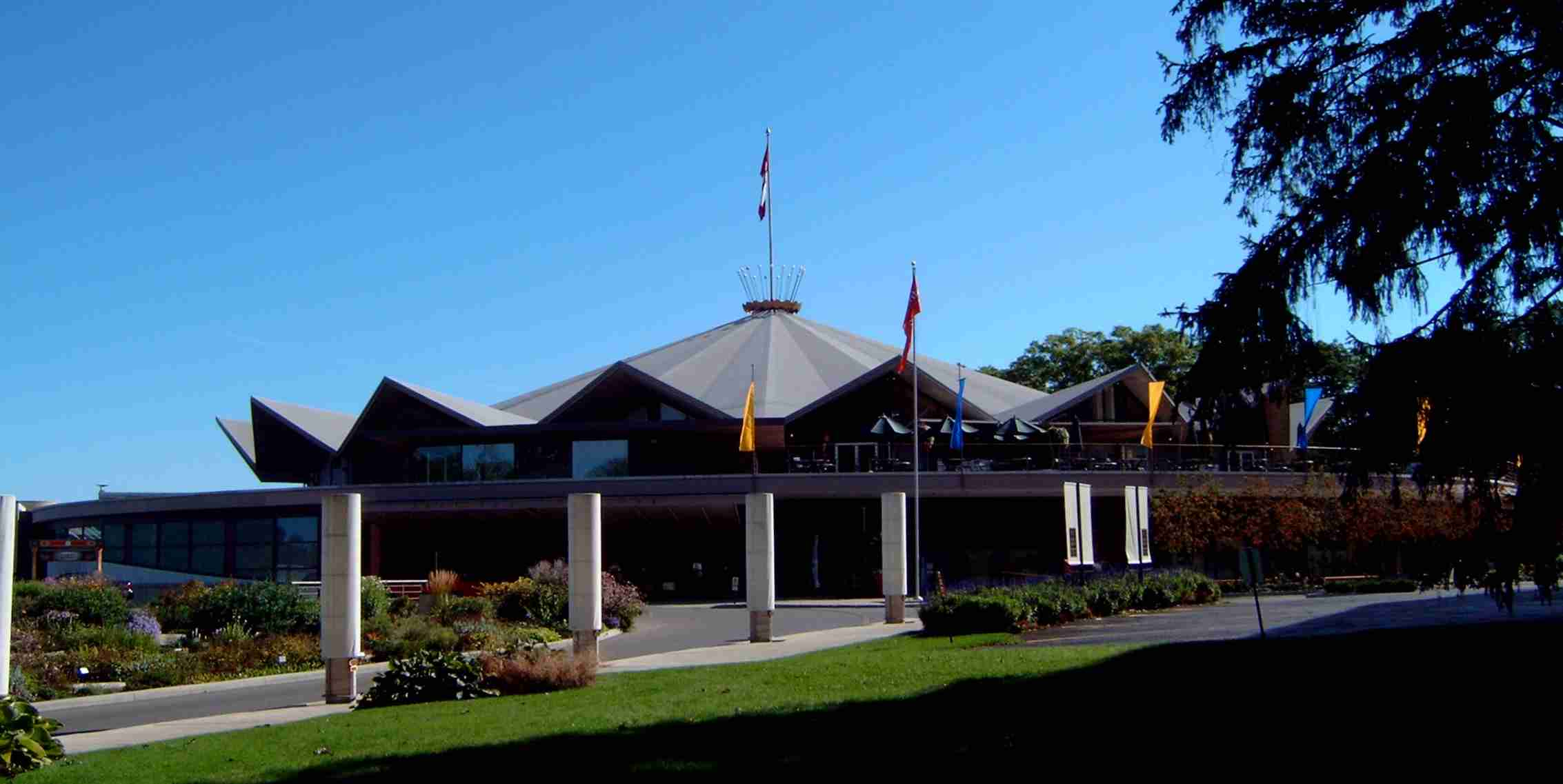
The Festival Theatre

This page describes the production history of the Stratford Festival.

The Stratford Festival (formerly known as the Stratford Shakespearean Festival, the Stratford Festival of Canada, and the Stratford Shakespeare Festival) is a summer-long celebration of theatre held each year in Stratford, Ontario. Theatre-goers, actors, and playwrights flock to Stratford to take part—many of the greatest Canadian, American and British actors have played roles at Stratford. It was one of the first and is still one of the most prominent arts festivals in Canada.

The Festival's primary mandate is to present productions of Shakespeare's plays, but it also produces a wide variety of theatre from Greek tragedy to Gilbert and Sullivan to Broadway musicals to contemporary works. By 2017, only three of the 14 productions were based on Shakespeare's works. The following is a chronological list of the productions that have been staged as part of the Stratford Festival since its inception.

On February 17, 2015, AP News reported that the Stratford Festival plans to film all of Shakespeare's plays.

== 1953 ==
- Richard III – by William Shakespeare
- All's Well That Ends Well – by William Shakespeare

== 1954 ==
- Measure for Measure – by William Shakespeare
- The Taming of the Shrew – by William Shakespeare
- Oedipus Rex – by Sophocles

== 1955 ==
- Julius Caesar – by William Shakespeare
- King Oedipus – by Sophocles
- The Merchant of Venice – by William Shakespeare

== 1956 ==
- Henry V – by William Shakespeare
- The Merry Wives of Windsor – by William Shakespeare
- Le Mariage forcé / Sganarelle / La Jalousie du barbouillé – by Molière
- The Rape of Lucrece – by William Shakespeare

== 1957 ==
- Hamlet – by William Shakespeare
- Twelfth Night – by William Shakespeare
- My Fur Lady – by Galt MacDermot
- The Turn of the Screw – composed by Benjamin Britten, libretto by Myfanwy Piper
- Peer Gynt – by Henrik Ibsen

== 1958 ==
- The Two Gentlemen of Verona – by William Shakespeare
- Henry IV, Part 1 – by William Shakespeare
- Much Ado About Nothing – by William Shakespeare
- The Winter's Tale – by William Shakespeare
- The Beggar's Opera – by John Gay
- Le Malade Imaginaire – by Molière

== 1959 ==
- As You Like It – by William Shakespeare
- Othello – by William Shakespeare
- Orpheus in the Underworld – by Jacques Offenbach
- After Hours
- The Heart Is Highland – by Robert Kemp

== 1960 ==
- King John – by William Shakespeare
- A Midsummer Night's Dream – by William Shakespeare
- Romeo and Juliet – by William Shakespeare
- H.M.S. Pinafore – music by Arthur Sullivan, libretto by W. S. Gilbert

== 1961 ==
- Coriolanus – by William Shakespeare
- Henry VIII – by William Shakespeare
- Love's Labour's Lost – by William Shakespeare
- The Pirates of Penzance – music by Arthur Sullivan, libretto by W. S. Gilbert
- The Canvas Barricade – by Donald Jack

== 1962 ==
- The Pirates of Penzance – music by Arthur Sullivan, libretto by W. S. Gilbert
- Macbeth – by William Shakespeare
- The Taming of the Shrew – by William Shakespeare
- The Tempest – by William Shakespeare
- The Gondoliers – music by Arthur Sullivan, libretto by W. S. Gilbert
- Cyrano de Bergerac – by Edmond Rostand

== 1963 ==
- Troilus and Cressida – by William Shakespeare
- Cyrano de Bergerac – by Edmond Rostand
- The Comedy of Errors – by William Shakespeare
- The Mikado – music by Arthur Sullivan, libretto by W. S. Gilbert
- Timon of Athens – by William Shakespeare

== 1964 ==
- Love's Labour's Lost – by William Shakespeare
- Le Bourgeois gentilhomme – by Molière
- Timon of Athens – by William Shakespeare
- Richard II – by William Shakespeare
- King Lear – by William Shakespeare
- The Yeomen of the Guard – music by Arthur Sullivan, libretto by W. S. Gilbert
- The Country Wife – by William Wycherley
- The Marriage of Figaro – by Wolfgang Amadeus Mozart

== 1965 ==
- Henry IV, Part 1 – by William Shakespeare
- Henry IV, Part 2 – by William Shakespeare
- Julius Caesar – by William Shakespeare
- Rise and Fall of the City of Mahagonny – by Kurt Weill, libretto by Bertolt Brecht
- The Marriage of Figaro – by Wolfgang Amadeus Mozart
- The Cherry Orchard – by Anton Chekhov

== 1966 ==
- Henry V – by William Shakespeare
- Henry VI – by William Shakespeare
- Twelfth Night – by William Shakespeare
- Don Giovanni – by Wolfgang Amadeus Mozart
- The Last of the Tsars – by Michael Bawtree
- The Dance of Death – by August Strindberg

== 1967 ==
- Henry V – by William Shakespeare
- The Government Inspector – by Nikolai Gogol
- Twelfth Night – by William Shakespeare
- Richard III – by William Shakespeare
- The Merry Wives of Windsor – by William Shakespeare
- Così fan tutte – by Wolfgang Amadeus Mozart
- Albert Herring – by Benjamin Britten
- Colours in the Dark – by James Reaney
- Antony and Cleopatra – by William Shakespeare

== 1968 ==
- A Midsummer Night's Dream – by William Shakespeare
- Romeo and Juliet – by William Shakespeare
- Tartuffe – by Molière
- Cinderella – by Gioacchino Rossini
- The Three Musketeers – by Alexandre Dumas
- The Seagull – by Anton Chekhov
- Waiting for Godot – by Samuel Beckett

== 1969 ==
- The Alchemist – by Ben Jonson
- Hamlet – by William Shakespeare
- Measure for Measure – by William Shakespeare
- Tartuffe – by Molière
- The Satyricon – by Petronius Arbiter
- Hadrian VII – by Frederick Rolfe

== 1970 ==
- The School for Scandal – by Richard Brinsley Sheridan
- The Merchant of Venice – by William Shakespeare
- Hedda Gabler – by Henrik Ibsen
- The Architect and the Emperor of Assyria – by Fernando Arrabal
- Cymbeline – by William Shakespeare
- The Friends – by Arnold Wesker
- Vatzlav – by Slawomir Mrozek

== 1971 ==
- Much Ado About Nothing – by William Shakespeare
- The Duchess of Malfi – by John Webster
- Macbeth – by William Shakespeare
- An Italian Straw Hat – by Eugène Labiche
- The Red Convertible – by Enrique Buenaventura
- Volpone – by Ben Jonson
- There's One In Every Marriage – by Georges Feydeau

== 1972 ==
- As You Like It – by William Shakespeare
- Lorenzaccio – by Alfred de Musset
- King Lear – by William Shakespeare
- The Threepenny Opera – by Bertolt Brecht and Kurt Weill
- Orpheus
- Mark
- She Stoops to Conquer – by Oliver Goldsmith
- Pinocchio – by John Wood and Alan Laing
- La Guerre Yes Sir! – by Roch Carrier

== 1973 ==
- The Taming of the Shrew – by William Shakespeare
- King Lear – by William Shakespeare
- She Stoops to Conquer – by Oliver Goldsmith
- Othello – by William Shakespeare
- A Month in the Country – by Ivan Turgenev
- The Collected Works of Billy the Kid – by Michael Ondaatje
- Pericles – by William Shakespeare
- Inook and the Sun – by Henry Beissel
- The Marriage Brokers – by Nikolai Gogol
- Exiles – by James Joyce

== 1974 ==
- The Imaginary Invalid – by Molière
- Pericles – by William Shakespeare
- Love's Labour's Lost – by William Shakespeare
- La Vie Parisienne – composed by Jacques Offenbach, libretto by Henri Meilhac and Ludovic Halévy
- The Summoning of Everyman – by Charles Wilson
- The Medium – by Gian Carlo Menotti
- King John – by William Shakespeare
- Walsh – by Sharon Pollock
- Ready Steady Go – by Sandra Jones

== 1975 ==
- The Two Gentlemen of Verona – by William Shakespeare
- The Comedy of Errors – by William Shakespeare
- Saint Joan – by George Bernard Shaw
- Twelfth Night – by William Shakespeare
- Measure for Measure – by William Shakespeare
- The Crucible – by Arthur Miller
- Trumpets and Drums – by Bertolt Brecht
- The Fool – by Harry Somers and Michael Fram
- Le Magicien – by Jean Vallerand
- Ariadne Auf Naxos – by Richard Strauss
- Fellowship – by Michael Tait
- Oscar Remembered – by Maxim Mazumdar
- Kennedy's Children
- The Importance of Being Earnest – by Oscar Wilde

== 1976 ==
- Hamlet – by William Shakespeare
- The Way of the World – by William Congreve
- The Merchant of Venice – by William Shakespeare
- The Tempest – by William Shakespeare
- Antony and Cleopatra – by William Shakespeare
- The Importance of Being Earnest – by Oscar Wilde
- Measure for Measure – by William Shakespeare
- Eve – by Larry Fineberg
- A Midsummer Night's Dream – by William Shakespeare
- Three Sisters – by Anton Chekhov

== 1977 ==
- A Midsummer Night's Dream – by William Shakespeare
- Romeo and Juliet – by William Shakespeare
- All's Well That Ends Well – by William Shakespeare
- Ghosts – by Henrik Ibsen
- Miss Julie – by August Strindberg
- Richard III – by William Shakespeare
- The Guardsman – by Ferenc Molnár
- Much Ado About Nothing – by William Shakespeare
- As You Like It – by William Shakespeare
- Hay Fever – by Noël Coward

== 1978 ==
- A Gala Shakespeare Revel
- The Devils – by John Whiting
- The Merry Wives of Windsor – by William Shakespeare
- Macbeth – by William Shakespeare
- Uncle Vanya – by Anton Chekhov
- Candide – music by Leonard Bernstein – book by Hugh Wheeler
- The Winter's Tale – by William Shakespeare
- As You Like It – by William Shakespeare
- Judgement – by Barry Collins
- Heloise and Abelard: Love Letters from the Middle Ages – by Ronald Duncan
- Ned and Jack – by Sheldon Rosen
- Medea – by Larry Fineberg
- Private Lives – by Noël Coward
- Julius Caesar – by William Shakespeare
- Come and Go, Not I, From an Abandoned Work, Footfalls – by Samuel Beckett
- Stargazing – by Tom Cone
- Titus Andronicus – by William Shakespeare

== 1979 ==
- Shakespeare Gala
- Love's Labour's Lost – by William Shakespeare
- Ned and Jack – by Sheldon Rosen
- Henry IV, Part 1 – by William Shakespeare
- Henry IV, Part 2 – by William Shakespeare
- Richard II – by William Shakespeare
- The Importance of Being Earnest – by Oscar Wilde
- Happy New Year – book by Burt Shevelove, music and lyrics by Cole Porter
- The Taming of the Shrew – by William Shakespeare
- The Woman – by Edward Bond
- Othello – by William Shakespeare
- Victoria – by Steve Petch
- Barren/Yerma – by Federico García Lorca
- King Lear – by William Shakespeare

== 1980 ==
- The Beggar's Opera – by John Gay
- Twelfth Night – by William Shakespeare
- Henry V – by William Shakespeare
- Virginia – by Edna O'Brien
- The Servant of Two Masters – by Carlo Goldoni
- Titus Andronicus – by William Shakespeare
- The Gin Game – by Donald L. Coburn
- Much Ado About Nothing – by William Shakespeare
- Bosoms and Neglect – by John Guare
- Brief Lives – by Patrick Garland, based on the writings of John Aubrey
- Foxfire – by Susan Cooper and Hume Cronyn
- The Seagull – by Anton Chekhov
- Henry VI – by William Shakespeare
- King Lear – by William Shakespeare
- Long Day's Journey into Night – by Eugene O'Neill

== 1981 ==
- The Misanthrope – by Molière
- H.M.S. Pinafore – music by Arthur Sullivan, libretto by W. S. Gilbert
- Coriolanus – by William Shakespeare
- The Taming of the Shrew – by William Shakespeare
- The Rivals – by Richard Brinsley Sheridan
- The Comedy of Errors – by William Shakespeare
- The Visit – by Friedrich Dürrenmatt
- Wild Oats – by John O'Keeffe

== 1982 ==
- Julius Caesar – by William Shakespeare
- The Mikado – music by Arthur Sullivan, libretto by W. S. Gilbert
- The Merry Wives of Windsor – by William Shakespeare
- The Tempest – by William Shakespeare
- A Midsummer Night's Dream – by William Shakespeare
- All's Well That Ends Well – by William Shakespeare
- Translations – by Brian Friel
- Damien – by Aldyth Morris
- Arms and the Man – by George Bernard Shaw
- Mary Stuart – by Friedrich Schiller
- A Variable Passion – by Nicholas Pennell and Elliott Hayes
- Blithe Spirit – by Noël Coward

== 1983 ==
- Macbeth – by William Shakespeare
- The Gondoliers – music by Arthur Sullivan, libretto by W. S. Gilbert
- As You Like It – by William Shakespeare
- Richard II – by William Shakespeare
- Blake – by Elliott Hayes
- Damien
- The Mikado – music by Arthur Sullivan, libretto by W. S. Gilbert
- When That I Was
- The Country Wife – by William Wycherley
- Tartuffe – by Molière
- Love's Labour's Lost – by William Shakespeare
- Much Ado About Nothing – by William Shakespeare
- Death of a Salesman – by Arthur Miller

== 1984 ==
- A Midsummer Night's Dream – by William Shakespeare
- Iolanthe – music by Arthur Sullivan, libretto by W. S. Gilbert
- Romeo and Juliet – by William Shakespeare
- Love's Labour's Lost – by William Shakespeare
- The Gondoliers – music by Arthur Sullivan, libretto by W. S. Gilbert
- Waiting for Godot – by Samuel Beckett
- The Two Gentlemen of Verona – by William Shakespeare
- The Mikado – music by Arthur Sullivan, libretto by W. S. Gilbert
- Tartuffe – by Molière
- Henry IV, Part 1 – by William Shakespeare
- The Merchant of Venice – by William Shakespeare
- A Streetcar Named Desire – by Tennessee Williams
- Separate Tables – by Terence Rattigan

== 1985 ==
- King Lear – by William Shakespeare
- The Pirates of Penzance – music by Arthur Sullivan, libretto by W. S. Gilbert
- Twelfth Night – by William Shakespeare
- Measure for Measure – by William Shakespeare
- Antigone – by Sophocles
- The Beaux' Stratagem – by George Farquhar
- She Stoops to Conquer – by Oliver Goldsmith
- The Government Inspector – by Nikolai Gogol
- The Glass Menagerie – by Tennessee Williams

== 1986 ==
The 1986 season was staged by Artistic Director John Neville with Shakespeare plays produced against a modern play with similar themes or characters (i.e. Hamlet and Rosencrantz and Guildenstern are Dead).

- The Boys from Syracuse – by Richard Rodgers, lyrics by Lorenz Hart
- Hamlet – by William Shakespeare
- The Winter's Tale – by William Shakespeare
- Rosencrantz & Guildenstern Are Dead – by Tom Stoppard
- Pericles – by William Shakespeare
- Henry VIII – by William Shakespeare
- The Resistible Rise of Arturo Ui – by Bertolt Brecht
- Macbeth – by William Shakespeare
- A Man for All Seasons – by Robert Bolt
- Cymbeline – by William Shakespeare

== 1987 ==
Artistic Director John Neville staged the 1987 season with an Anti-War theme.

- Cabaret – book by Joe Masteroff, lyrics by Fred Ebb, music by John Kander
- Nora – by Henrik Ibsen
- Mother Courage – by Bertolt Brecht
- As You Like It – by William Shakespeare
- Troilus and Cressida – by William Shakespeare
- The School for Scandal – by Richard Brinsley Sheridan
- The Cherry Orchard – by Anton Chekhov
- Romeo and Juliet – by William Shakespeare
- Not About Heroes – by Stephen MacDonald
- Intimate Admiration – by Richard Epp
- Journey's End – by R. C. Sherriff
- Othello – by William Shakespeare
- Much Ado About Nothing – by William Shakespeare

== 1988 ==
- Richard III – by William Shakespeare
- All's Well That Ends Well – by William Shakespeare
- The Taming of the Shrew – by William Shakespeare
- Murder in the Cathedral – by T. S. Eliot
- Twelfth Night – by William Shakespeare
- My Fair Lady – book and lyrics by Alan Jay Lerner, music by Frederick Loewe
- King Lear – by William Shakespeare
- The Two Gentlemen of Verona – by William Shakespeare
- Not About Heroes – by Stephen MacDonald
- The Three Musketeers – by Alexandre Dumas
- Irma La Douce – music by Marguerite Monnot, lyrics and book by Alexandre Breffort
- Oedipus / The Critic – by Sophocles / Richard Brinsley Sheridan

== 1989 ==
- Titus Andronicus / The Comedy of Errors – by William Shakespeare
- A Midsummer Night's Dream – by William Shakespeare
- The Merchant of Venice – by William Shakespeare
- Three Sisters – by Anton Chekhov
- Kiss Me, Kate – book by Samuel and Bella Spewack – music and lyrics by Cole Porter
- Henry V – by William Shakespeare
- Love's Labour's Lost – by William Shakespeare
- The Changeling – by Thomas Middleton and William Rowley
- The Shoemaker's Holiday – by Thomas Dekker
- The Relapse – by Sir John Vanbrugh
- The Proposal – by Anton Chekhov
- Cat on a Hot Tin Roof – by Tennessee Williams
- Guthrie on Guthrie – by Margaret Dale
- The Lunatic, the Lover & the Poet – adapted by Brian Bedford

== 1990 ==
- Macbeth – by William Shakespeare
- The Merry Wives of Windsor – by William Shakespeare
- As You Like It – by William Shakespeare
- Home – by David Storey
- Guys and Dolls – music and lyrics by Frank Loesser, book by Jo Swerling and Abe Burrows
- Love for Love – by William Congreve
- Memoir – by John Murrell
- Forever Yours, Marie-Lou – by Michel Tremblay
- Phaedra – by Jean Racine
- Julius Caesar – by William Shakespeare
- Ah, Wilderness! – by Eugene O'Neill
- The Knight of the Burning Pestle – by Francis Beaumont
- The Lunatic, the Lover & the Poet – adapted by Brian Bedford
- The Grand Inquisitor / Swan Song – by Fyodor Dostoevsky / Anton Chekhov
- One Tiger to a Hill – by Sharon Pollock

== 1991 ==
- Hamlet – by William Shakespeare
- Carousel – by Richard Rodgers and Oscar Hammerstein II
- Much Ado About Nothing – by William Shakespeare
- Twelfth Night – by William Shakespeare
- Homeward Bound – by Elliott Hayes
- Les Belles-sœurs – by Michel Tremblay
- Our Town – by Thornton Wilder
- Timon of Athens – by William Shakespeare
- Homeward Bound – by Elliott Hayes
- The Knight of the Burning Pestle – by Francis Beaumont
- Rules of the Game – by [Luigi Pirandello]
- Treasure Island – by Robert Louis Stevenson
- Love Letters – by A. R. Gurney

== 1992 ==
- The Tempest – by William Shakespeare
- Romeo and Juliet – by William Shakespeare
- Love's Labour's Lost – by William Shakespeare
- Measure for Measure – by William Shakespeare
- The Two Gentlemen of Verona – by William Shakespeare
- H.M.S. Pinafore – music by Arthur Sullivan, libretto by W. S. Gilbert
- World of Wonders – by Robertson Davies – adapted by Elliott Hayes
- Entertaining Mr. Sloane – by Joe Orton
- Uncle Vanya – by Anton Chekhov
- Bonjour, là, bonjour – by Michel Tremblay
- Shirley Valentine – by Willy Russell

== 1993 ==
- Antony and Cleopatra – by William Shakespeare
- A Midsummer Night's Dream – by William Shakespeare
- Gypsy – music by Jule Styne, lyrics by Stephen Sondheim, book by Arthur Laurents
- The Imaginary Invalid – by Molière
- The Mikado – music by Arthur Sullivan, libretto by W. S. Gilbert
- The Importance of Being Earnest – by Oscar Wilde
- King John – by William Shakespeare
- The Wingfield Trilogy – by Dan Needles
- Bacchae – by Euripides
- Fair Liberty's Call – by Sharon Pollock
- The Illusion – by Pierre Corneille

== 1994 ==
- Twelfth Night – by William Shakespeare
- Othello – by William Shakespeare
- Hamlet – by William Shakespeare
- The Comedy of Errors – by William Shakespeare
- Cyrano de Bergerac – by Edmond Rostand
- The School for Wives – by Molière
- Long Day's Journey into Night – by Eugene O'Neill; this version was later filmed by David Wellington as the 1996 film Long Day's Journey into Night.
- The Pirates of Penzance – music by Arthur Sullivan, libretto by W. S. Gilbert
- Alice Through the Looking-Glass – by Lewis Carroll
- In the Ring – by Jean-Marc Dalpé

== 1995 ==
- Macbeth – by William Shakespeare
- The Country Wife – by William Wycherley
- The Merry Wives of Windsor – by William Shakespeare
- Amadeus – by Peter Shaffer
- The Gondoliers – music by Arthur Sullivan, libretto by W. S. Gilbert
- The Boy Friend – by Sandy Wilson
- Long Day's Journey into Night – by Eugene O'Neill
- The Comedy of Errors – by William Shakespeare
- The Stillborn Lover – by Timothy Findley

== 1996 ==
- King Lear – by William Shakespeare
- The Music Man – by Meredith Willson
- Amadeus – by Peter Shaffer
- The Little Foxes – by Lillian Hellman
- A Fitting Confusion – by Georges Feydeau
- The Merchant of Venice – by William Shakespeare
- Alice Through the Looking-Glass – by Lewis Carroll
- As You Like It – by William Shakespeare
- Sweet Bird of Youth – by Tennessee Williams
- Waiting for Godot – by Samuel Beckett
- Barrymore – by William Luce

== 1997 ==
- Camelot – by Alan Jay Lerner and Frederick Loewe
- The Taming of the Shrew – by William Shakespeare
- Romeo and Juliet – by William Shakespeare
- Oedipus Rex – by Sophocles
- Death of a Salesman – by Arthur Miller
- Little Women – by Louisa May Alcott
- Filumena – by Eduardo De Filippo
- Richard III – by William Shakespeare
- Juno and the Paycock – by Seán O'Casey
- Coriolanus – by William Shakespeare
- Wingfield Unbound – by Dan Needles
- Equus – by Peter Shaffer

== 1998 ==
- Julius Caesar – by William Shakespeare
- Man of La Mancha – book by Dale Wasserman, lyrics by Joe Darion, music by Mitch Leigh
- A Man for All Seasons – by Robert Bolt
- The Night of the Iguana – by Tennessee Williams
- The Prime of Miss Jean Brodie – by Jay Presson Allen
- The Winter's Tale – by William Shakespeare
- The Two Gentlemen of Verona – by William Shakespeare
- Much Ado About Nothing – by William Shakespeare
- The Miracle Worker – by William Gibson
- The Miser – by Molière
- The Cherry Orchard – by Anton Chekhov, translation by John Murrell
- Waiting for Godot – by Samuel Beckett

== 1999 ==
- The Tempest – by William Shakespeare
- A Midsummer Night's Dream – by William Shakespeare
- Pride and Prejudice – by Jane Austen
- The Alchemist – by Ben Jonson
- The School for Scandal – by Richard Brinsley Sheridan
- Dracula: A Chamber Musical – book and lyrics by Richard Ouzounian, music by Marek Norman
- West Side Story – book by Arthur Laurents, music by Leonard Bernstein, lyrics by Stephen Sondheim
- Macbeth – by William Shakespeare
- Glenn – by David Young
- Richard II – by William Shakespeare

== 2000 ==
- Hamlet – by William Shakespeare
- As You Like It – by William Shakespeare
- Titus Andronicus – by William Shakespeare
- Fiddler on the Roof – music by Jerry Bock, lyrics by Sheldon Harnick, book by Joseph Stein
- Tartuffe – by Molière
- The Diary of Anne Frank – by Frances Goodrich and Albert Hackett
- Patience – music by Arthur Sullivan, libretto by W. S. Gilbert
- Medea – by Euripides
- Elizabeth Rex – by Timothy Findley
- The Three Musketeers – by Alexandre Dumas
- The Importance of Being Earnest – by Oscar Wilde

== 2001 ==
- The Merchant of Venice – by William Shakespeare
- Twelfth Night – by William Shakespeare
- The Sound of Music – by Richard Rodgers and Oscar Hammerstein II
- Inherit the Wind – by Jerome Lawrence and Robert Edwin Lee
- Private Lives – by Noël Coward
- Who's Afraid of Virginia Woolf? – by Edward Albee
- The Seagull – by Anton Chekhov
- Wingfield on Ice – by Dan Needles
- Henry V – by William Shakespeare
- Henry IV, Part 1 – by William Shakespeare
- Henry IV, Part 2 (Falstaff) – by William Shakespeare
- Tempest-Tost – by Robertson Davies
- The Trials of Ezra Pound – by Timothy Findley
- Good Mother – by Damien Atkins

== 2002 ==
- All's Well That Ends Well – by William Shakespeare
- My Fair Lady – book and lyrics by Alan Jay Lerner, music by Frederick Loewe
- Romeo and Juliet – by William Shakespeare
- King Lear – by William Shakespeare
- The Threepenny Opera – by Bertolt Brecht and Kurt Weill
- The Scarlet Pimpernel – by Baroness Emmuska Orczy
- Richard III: Reign of Terror – by William Shakespeare
- Henry VI: Revenge in France – by William Shakespeare
- Henry VI: Revolt in England – by William Shakespeare
- The Two Noble Kinsmen – by William Shakespeare
- The Lunatic, the Lover & the Poet – adapted by Brian Bedford
- High-Gravel-Blind / Eternal Hydra – by Paul Dunn / Anton Piatigorsky
- Bereav'd of Light / The Fellini Radio Plays – by Ian Ross / Federico Fellini, adapted by Damiano Pietropaolo
- Walk Right Up / Shadows – by Celia McBride / Timothy Findley
- The Swanne: George III (The Death of Cupid) – by Peter Hinton

== 2003 ==
- The Taming of the Shrew – by William Shakespeare
- The King and I – by Richard Rodgers and Oscar Hammerstein II
- The Adventures of Pericles – by William Shakespeare
- Love's Labour's Lost – by William Shakespeare
- Gigi – book and lyrics by Alan Jay Lerner, music by Frederick Loewe
- The Hunchback of Notre Dame – by Victor Hugo
- Present Laughter – by Noël Coward
- Antony and Cleopatra – by William Shakespeare
- No Exit – by Jean-Paul Sartre
- The Birds – by Aristophanes
- Troilus and Cressida – by William Shakespeare
- Quiet in the Land – by Anne Chislett
- Agamemnon – by Aeschylus
- Electra – by Jean Giraudoux
- The Flies – by Jean-Paul Sartre
- The Swanne: Princess Charlotte (The Acts of Venus) – by Peter Hinton

== 2004 ==
- A Midsummer Night's Dream – by William Shakespeare
- Guys and Dolls – music and lyrics by Frank Loesser, book by Jo Swerling and Abe Burrows
- Macbeth – by William Shakespeare
- King Henry VIII (All Is True) – by William Shakespeare
- The Count of Monte Cristo – by Alexandre Dumas
- Anything Goes – by Cole Porter
- Noises Off – by Michael Frayn
- Timon of Athens – by William Shakespeare
- Cymbeline – by William Shakespeare
- King John – by William Shakespeare
- The Triumph of Love – by Pierre Carlet de Chamblain de Marivaux
- The Swanne: Queen Victoria (The Seduction of Nemesis) – by Peter Hinton
- The Elephant Song – by Nicolas Billon
- The Human Voice – by Jean Cocteau

== 2005 ==
- The Tempest – by William Shakespeare
- Hello, Dolly! – lyrics and music by Jerry Herman, book by Michael Stewart
- As You Like It – by William Shakespeare
- The Lark – by Jean Anouilh
- Cat on a Hot Tin Roof – by Tennessee Williams
- Fallen Angels – by Noël Coward
- Into the Woods – by Stephen Sondheim and James Lapine
- The Brothers Karamazov – by Fyodor Dostoevsky
- Wingfield's Inferno – by Dan Needles
- Orpheus Descending – by Tennessee Williams
- Measure for Measure – by William Shakespeare
- The Donnellys: Sticks & Stones – by James Reaney
- The Measure of Love – by Nicolas Billon
- Ruth Draper on Tour – by Raymond O'Neill
- Edward II – by Christopher Marlowe

== 2006 ==
- Coriolanus – by William Shakespeare
- Oliver! – by Lionel Bart
- Much Ado About Nothing – by William Shakespeare
- Twelfth Night – by William Shakespeare
- The Glass Menagerie – by Tennessee Williams
- London Assurance – by Dion Boucicault
- South Pacific – by Richard Rodgers and Oscar Hammerstein II
- Don Juan – by Molière
- Henry IV, Part 1 – by William Shakespeare
- The Duchess of Malfi – by John Webster
- Ghosts – by Henrik Ibsen
- Harlem Duet – by Djanet Sears
- The Blonde, the Brunette and the Vengeful Redhead – by Robert Hewett
- Fanny Kemble – by Peter Hinton
- The Liar – by Pierre Corneille

== 2007 ==
- King Lear – by William Shakespeare
- Oklahoma! – by Richard Rodgers and Oscar Hammerstein II
- The Merchant of Venice – by William Shakespeare
- An Ideal Husband – by Oscar Wilde
- To Kill a Mockingbird – by Harper Lee and Christopher Sergel
- My One and Only – book by Peter Stone and Timothy S. Mayer, music and lyrics by George Gershwin and Ira Gershwin
- The Comedy of Errors – by William Shakespeare
- Othello – by William Shakespeare
- Of Mice and Men – by John Steinbeck
- A Delicate Balance – by Edward Albee
- The Blonde, the Brunette and the Vengeful Redhead – by Robert Hewett
- Shakespeare's Will – by Vern Thiessen
- The Odyssey – by Derek Walcott
- Pentecost – by David Edgar

== 2008 ==
- Hamlet – by William Shakespeare
- The Taming of the Shrew – by William Shakespeare
- Romeo and Juliet – by William Shakespeare
- All's Well That Ends Well – by William Shakespeare
- Love's Labour's Lost – by William Shakespeare
- The Music Man – by Meredith Willson
- Cabaret – book by Joe Masteroff, lyrics by Fred Ebb, music by John Kander
- Caesar and Cleopatra – by George Bernard Shaw
- Fuente Ovejuna – by Lope de Vega
- The Trojan Women – by Euripides
- Emilia Galotti – by Gotthold Ephraim Lessing
- Palmer Park – by Joanna McClelland Glass
- Moby-Dick – by Morris Panych
- Krapp's Last Tape / Hughie – by Samuel Beckett / Eugene O'Neill
- Her Infinite Variety – by Peter Hinton
- There Reigns Love – by Simon Callow

== 2009 ==
- A Midsummer Night's Dream – by William Shakespeare
- Macbeth – by William Shakespeare
- Julius Caesar – by William Shakespeare
- Bartholomew Fair – by Ben Jonson
- Cyrano de Bergerac – by Edmond Rostand
- Three Sisters – by Anton Chekhov
- The Importance of Being Earnest – by Oscar Wilde
- Phèdre – by Jean Racine
- The Trespassers – by Morris Panych
- Zastrozzi – by George F. Walker
- Rice Boy – by Sunil Kuruvilla
- West Side Story – book by Arthur Laurents, music by Leonard Bernstein, lyrics by Stephen Sondheim
- A Funny Thing Happened On The Way To The Forum – music and lyrics by Stephen Sondheim, book by Burt Shevelove and Larry Gelbart

== 2010 ==
- The Tempest – by William Shakespeare
- As You Like It – by William Shakespeare
- The Winter's Tale – by William Shakespeare
- The Two Gentlemen of Verona – by William Shakespeare
- Do Not Go Gentle – by Leon Pownall
- Kiss Me, Kate – by Cole Porter
- Dangerous Liaisons – by Christopher Hampton
- Evita – book by Arthur Laurents, music by Andrew Lloyd Webber, lyrics by Tim Rice
- Peter Pan – by J.M. Barrie
- Jacques Brel is Alive and Well and Living in Paris – by Jacques Brel and Eric Blau
- King of Thieves – by George F. Walker
- For the Pleasure of Seeing Her Again – by Michel Tremblay

== 2011 ==
- Twelfth Night – by William Shakespeare
- The Merry Wives of Windsor – by William Shakespeare
- Titus Andronicus – by William Shakespeare
- Richard III – by William Shakespeare
- Camelot – by Alan Jay Lerner and Frederick Loewe
- Jesus Christ Superstar – by Andrew Lloyd Webber and Tim Rice
- The Grapes of Wrath – by Frank Galati
- The Homecoming – by Harold Pinter
- The Misanthrope – by Molière
- Hosanna – by Michel Tremblay
- The Little Years – by John Mighton
- Shakespeare's Will – by Vern Thiessen

== 2012 ==
- Much Ado About Nothing – by William Shakespeare
- 42nd Street – book by Michael Stewart and Mark Bramble, lyrics by Al Dubin, music by Harry Warren
- Henry V – by William Shakespeare
- The Matchmaker – by Thornton Wilder
- A Word or Two – by Christopher Plummer
- The Pirates of Penzance – music by Arthur Sullivan, libretto by W. S. Gilbert
- You're a Good Man, Charlie Brown – music and lyrics by Clark Gesner, based on characters created by Charles M. Schulz
- Cymbeline – by William Shakespeare
- Elektra – by Sophocles
- Wonderlust – by Morris Panych, music by Marek Norman
- The Hirsch Project – by Alon Nashman and Paul Thompson
- The Best Brothers – by Daniel MacIvor
- MacHomer – by Rick Miller
- The War of 1812 – by Michael Hollingsworth

== 2013 ==
The 2013 season was staged by Artistic Director Antoni Cimolino around the themes of Societies Divided and The Outsider

- Romeo and Juliet – by William Shakespeare
- Fiddler on the Roof – music by Jerry Bock, lyrics by Sheldon Harnick, book by Joseph Stein
- The Three Musketeers – by Peter Raby, adapted from the novel by Alexandre Dumas
- The Merchant of Venice – by William Shakespeare
- Blithe Spirit – by Noël Coward
- The Who's Tommy – by Pete Townshend and Des McAnuff
- Othello – by William Shakespeare
- Measure for Measure – by William Shakespeare
- Mary Stuart – by Friedrich Schiller
- Waiting for Godot – by Samuel Beckett
- Taking Shakespeare – by John Murrell
- The Thrill – by Judith Thompson

== 2014 ==
The 2014 season was staged by Artistic Director Antoni Cimolino around the theme of Madness: Minds Pushed to the Edge

- King Lear – by William Shakespeare
- Crazy for You – book by Ken Ludwig, lyrics by Ira Gershwin, music by George Gershwin
- A Midsummer Night's Dream – by William Shakespeare
- The Beaux' Stratagem – by George Farquhar
- Hay Fever – by Noël Coward
- Man of La Mancha – book by Dale Wasserman, lyrics by Joe Darion, music by Mitch Leigh
- Alice Through the Looking-Glass – by Lewis Carroll, adapted by James Reaney
- Mother Courage – by Bertolt Brecht
- King John – by William Shakespeare
- Antony and Cleopatra – by William Shakespeare
- Christina, The Girl King – by Michel Marc Bouchard, translated by Linda Gaboriau

== 2015 ==
The 2015 season was staged by Artistic Director Antoni Cimolino around the theme of Discovery, with a selection of 13 plays that explore "eureka" moments

- Hamlet – by William Shakespeare
- The Sound of Music – by Richard Rodgers and Oscar Hammerstein II
- The Taming of the Shrew ‚ by William Shakespeare
- Love's Labour's Lost – by William Shakespeare
- She Stoops to Conquer – by Oliver Goldsmith
- Carousel – by Richard Rodgers and Oscar Hammerstein II
- The Diary of Anne Frank – by Frances Goodrich and Albert Hackett
- Oedipus – by Sophocles
- Pericles – by William Shakespeare
- The Physicists – by Friedrich Durrenmatt
- The Alchemist – by Ben Jonson
- Possible Worlds – by John Mighton
- The Last Wife – by Kate Hennig

== 2016 ==
The 2016 season was staged by Artistic Director Antoni Cimolino around the theme of After the Victory

- Shakespeare in Love – by Lee Hall, adapted from the screenplay by Tom Stoppard and Marc Norman
- Breath of Kings – adapted by Graham Abbey, based on four plays by William Shakespeare
- As You Like It – by William Shakespeare
- Macbeth – by William Shakespeare
- A Chorus Line – music by Marvin Hamlisch, lyrics by Edward Kleban, book by James Kirkwood, Jr. and Nicholas Dante
- A Little Night Music – music and lyrics by Stephen Sondheim, book by Hugh Wheeler
- Bunny – by Hannah Moscovitch
- John Gabriel Borkman – by Henrik Ibsen
- The Hypochondriac – by Richard Bean
- The Lion, the Witch and the Wardrobe – by C.S. Lewis, adapted by Adrian Mitchell
- All My Sons – by Arthur Miller
- The Aeneid – adapted by Olivier Kemeid, translated by Maureen Labonté

== 2017 ==
The 2017 season was staged by Artistic Director Antoni Cimolino around the theme of Questions of Identity

- Twelfth Night – by William Shakespeare
- Romeo and Juliet – by William Shakespeare
- Tartuffe – by Molière
- Guys and Dolls – music and lyrics by Frank Loesser, book by Jo Swerling and Abe Burrows
- H.M.S. Pinafore – music by Arthur Sullivan, libretto by W. S. Gilbert
- Treasure Island – by Robert Louis Stevenson
- The School for Scandal – by Richard Brinsley Sheridan
- The Komagata Maru Incident – by Sharon Pollock
- The Breathing Hole – by Colleen Murphy
- The Virgin Trial – by Kate Hennig
- Bakkhai – by Euripides
- The Changeling – by Thomas Middleton and William Rowley
- The Madwoman of Chaillot – by Jean Giraudoux
- Timon of Athens – by William Shakespeare

== 2018 ==
For the 2018 season, Artistic Director Antoni Cimolino chose 12 productions that explored the theme of Free Will.

- The Tempest – by William Shakespeare
- The Music Man – by Meredith Willson
- Julius Caesar – by William Shakespeare
- Coriolanus – by William Shakespeare
- Napoli milionaria – by Eduardo De Filippo, in a new translation by John Murrell, from a literal translation by Donato Santeramo
- To Kill a Mockingbird – by Harper Lee, dramatized by Christoper Sergel
- The Rocky Horror Show – by Richard O'Brien
- An Ideal Husband – by Oscar Wilde
- Paradise Lost – by John Milton, adapted for the theatre by Erin Shields
- Brontë – by Jordi Mand
- The Comedy of Errors – by William Shakespeare
- Long Day's Journey Into Night – by Eugene O'Neill

== 2019 ==
For the 2019 season, Artistic Director Antoni Cimolino has chosen 12 productions that explore the theme of Breaking Boundaries

- Othello – by William Shakespeare
- Billy Elliot the Musical – Book and Lyrics by Lee Hall, music by Elton John
- The Merry Wives of Windsor – by William Shakespeare
- Henry VIII – by William Shakespeare
- The Crucible – by Arthur Miller
- The Neverending Story – by Michael Ende, adapted for the stage by David S. Craig
- Little Shop of Horrors – Book and Lyrics by Howard Ashman, music by Alan Menken
- Birds of a Kind – by Wajdi Mouawad, English translation by Linda Gaboriau
- The Front Page – by Ben Hecht and Charles MacArthur
- Nathan the Wise – by Gotthold Ephraim Lessing, in a version by Edward Kemp
- Private Lives – by Noël Coward
- Mother's Daughter – by Kate Hennig

== 2020 ==
The 2020 season had a theme of Power, and was to mark the opening of the new Tom Patterson Theatre Centre.

In March 2020, as preparations for the upcoming season were underway, the Festival was forced to announce performance cancellations and layoffs due to the COVID-19 pandemic. A month later, the entire 2020 season was put on hold and effectively cancelled. Just before the season's cancellation, Cimolino announced that all productions that had been filmed as part of the Stratford Festival On Film series would be streamed online for free, with a different production being shown each week. Throughout the summer of 2020, the Festival produced four web series which, along with all the filmed productions and other Stratford documentaries and interviews, were launched in October 2020 on the new Stratfest@Home web streaming service. Some of the cancelled stage productions were presented in subsequent seasons.

- Richard III – by William Shakespeare
- All's Well That Ends Well – by William Shakespeare
- Here's What It Takes – music and lyrics by Steven Page, book by Daniel MacIvor, additional music and lyrics by Craig Northey
- Frankenstein Revived – by Morris Panych, based on the novel by Mary Shelley
- An Undiscovered Shakespeare – by Rebecca Northan
- Much Ado About Nothing – by William Shakespeare
- Chicago – music by John Kander, lyrics by Fred Ebb, and book by Ebb and Bob Fosse
- Hamlet – by William Shakespeare
- The Miser – by Molière, translated by Ranjit Bolt
- Wendy & Peter Pan – by Ella Hickson, from the book by J.M. Barrie
- Monty Python's Spamalot – book and lyrics by Eric Idle, music by John Du Prez and Eric Idle
- Wolf Hall – by Hilary Mantel, adapted for the stage by Mike Poulton
- Three Tall Women – by Edward Albee
- The Rez Sisters – by Thomson Highway
- Hamlet–911 – by Ann-Marie MacDonald

== 2021 ==
In April 2021, the Stratford Festival announced a season of plays and cabarets, most of which took place under canopies outside the Festival and Tom Patterson Theatres with reduced cast sizes and social distancing. Only Three Tall Women was presented indoors at the Studio Theatre. The 2021 season theme was metamorphosis.

Plays

- Three Tall Women – by Edward Albee
- R + J – by William Shakespeare, adapted by Ravi Jain, Christine Horne & Alex Bulmer
- A Midsummer Night's Dream – by William Shakespeare
- The Rez Sisters – by Thomson Highway
- I Am William – by Rébecca Déraspe
- Serving Elizabeth – by Marcia Johnson

Cabarets

- Why We Tell the Story: A Celebration of Black Musical Theatre – curated and directed by Marcus Nance
- You Can't Stop the Beat: The Enduring Power of Musical Theatre – curated and directed by Thom Allison
- Play On! A Shakespeare-Inspired Mixtape – curated and directed by Robert Markus, Julia Nish-Lapidus and James Wallis
- Freedom: Spirit and Legacy of Black Music – curated and directed by Beau Dixon
- Finally There's Sun: A Cabaret of Resilience – curated and directed by Sara Farb and Steve Ross

== 2022 ==
- Hamlet – by William Shakespeare
- Chicago – music by John Kander, lyrics by Fred Ebb, and book by Ebb and Bob Fosse
- The Miser – by Molière, translated by Ranjit Bolt
- Richard III – by William Shakespeare
- All's Well That Ends Well – by William Shakespeare
- Death and the King's Horseman – by Wole Soyinka
- Little Women – by Louisa May Alcott, adapted by Jordi Mand
- Every Little Nookie – by Sunny Drake
- Hamlet–911 – by Ann-Marie MacDonald
- 1939 – by Jani Lauzon and Kaitlyn Riordan

== 2023 ==
- King Lear – by William Shakespeare
- Rent – Book, Music and Lyrics by Jonathan Larson
- Much Ado About Nothing – by William Shakespeare
- Les Belles-sœurs – by Michel Tremblay
- Monty Python's Spamalot – book and lyrics by Eric Idle, music by John Du Prez and Eric Idle
- A Wrinkle in Time – by Madeleine L'Engle, Adapted for the stage by Thomas Morgan Jones
- Frankenstein Revived – by Morris Panych, based on the novel by Mary Shelley
- Richard II – by William Shakespeare, Adapted by Brad Fraser
- Grand Magic – by Eduardo De Filippo, in a new English translation by John Murrell
- Wedding Band – by Alice Childress
- Casey and Diana – by Nick Green, a Stratford Festival commission
- Women of the Fur Trade – by Frances Koncan
- Love's Labour's Lost – by William Shakespeare

== 2024 ==
- Twelfth Night – by William Shakespeare
- Something Rotten! – Book by Karey Kirkpatrick & John O'Farrell, Music & lyrics by Karey Kirkpatrick & Wayne Kirkpatrick
- Romeo and Juliet – by William Shakespeare
- London Assurance – by Dion Boucicault
- La Cage Aux Folles – book by Harvey Fierstein, music & lyrics by Jerry Herman
- Wendy & Peter Pan – by Ella Hickson, adapted from the original play and novel by J.M. Barrie
- Salesman in China – by Leanna Brodie, and Jovanni Sy Suggested by the memoirs of Arthur Miller & Ying Ruocheng, World Premiere
- Cymbeline – by William Shakespeare
- Hedda Gabler – by Henrik Ibsen
- The Diviners – based on the novel by Margaret Laurence
- The Goat, or Who Is Sylvia? – by Edward Albee
- Get That Hope – by Andrea Scott, World Premiere

== 2025 ==
- As You Like It – by William Shakespeare
- Annie – Book by Thomas Meehan Music by Charles Strouse Lyrics by Martin Charnin
- Sense and Sensibility – by Kate Hamill based on the novel by Jane Austen
- Dangerous Liaisons – by Christopher Hampton based on the novel by Choderlos de Laclos
- Macbeth – by William Shakespeare
- Anne of Green Gables – by Kat Sandler, based on the novel by Lucy Maud Montgomery
- Dirty Rotten Scoundrels – Book by Jeffrey Lane Music and Lyrics by David Yazbek
- The Winter's Tale – by William Shakespeare
- Forgiveness – by Hiro Kanagawa Adapted from the book Forgiveness: A Gift From My Grandparents by Mark Sakamoto
- Ransacking Troy – By Erin Shields, a Stratford Festival commission
- The Art of War – by Yvette Nolan

== 2026 ==
- A Midsummer Night’s Dream – by William Shakespeare
- Othello – by William Shakespeare
- The Tempest – by William Shakespeare
- Death of a Salesman – by Arthur Miller
- Guys and Dolls – by Frank Loesser, Jo Swerling and Abe Burrows
- Something Rotten! – book by Karey Kirkpatrick and John O'Farrell, music and lyrics by Karey Kirkpatrick and Wayne Kirkpatrick
- Saturday, Sunday, Monday – by Eduardo De Filippo
- The Hobbit – adapted by Kim Selody from J.R.R. Tolkien
- The Importance of Being Earnest – by Oscar Wilde
- Waiting for Godot – by Samuel Beckett
- The King James Bible Play – by Charlotte Corbeil-Coleman
- The Tao of the World – by Jovanni Sy

== Frequency of production of Shakespeare's plays ==
Comedies

- The Tempest – 1962, 1976, 1982, 1992, 1999, 2005, 2010, 2018, 2026
- The Two Gentlemen of Verona – 1975, 1984, 1988, 1992, 1998, 2010
- The Merry Wives of Windsor – 1956, 1967, 1978, 1982, 1990, 1995, 2011, 2019
- Measure for Measure – 1954, 1969, 1975, 1976, 1985, 1992, 2005, 2013
- The Comedy of Errors – 1963, 1975, 1981, 1989, 1994, 1995, 2007, 2018
- Much Ado About Nothing – 1959, 1971, 1977, 1980, 1983, 1987, 1991, 1998, 2006, 2012, 2023
- Love's Labour's Lost – 1961, 1974, 1979, 1983, 1984, 1989, 1992, 2003, 2008, 2015, 2023
- A Midsummer Night's Dream – 1960, 1968, 1976, 1977, 1982, 1984, 1989, 1993, 1999, 2004, 2009, 2014, 2021, 2026
- The Merchant of Venice – 1955, 1970, 1976, 1984, 1989, 1996, 2001, 2007, 2013
- As You Like It – 1959, 1972, 1977, 1978, 1983, 1987, 1990, 1996, 2000, 2005, 2010, 2016, 2025
- The Taming of the Shrew – 1954, 1962, 1973, 1979, 1981, 1988, 1997, 2003, 2008, 2015
- All's Well That Ends Well – 1953, 1977, 1982, 1988, 2002, 2008, 2022
- Twelfth Night – 1957, 1966, 1975, 1980, 1985, 1988, 1991, 1994, 2001, 2006, 2011, 2017, 2024
- The Winter's Tale – 1958, 1978, 1986, 1998, 2010, 2025
- Pericles, Prince of Tyre – 1973, 1974, 1986, 2003, 2015
- The Two Noble Kinsmen – 2002

Histories

- King John – 1960, 1974, 1993, 2004, 2014
- Richard II – 1964, 1979, 1983, 1999, 2016, 2023
- Henry IV, Part 1 – 1958, 1965, 1979, 1984, 2001, 2006, 2016
- Henry IV, Part 2 – 1965, 1979, 2001, 2016
- Henry V – 1966, 1980, 1989, 2001, 2012, 2016
- Henry VI, Part 1 – 1966, 1980, 2002
- Henry VI, Part 2 – 1966, 1980, 2002
- Henry VI, Part 3 – 1966, 1980, 2002
- Richard III – 1953, 1967, 1977, 1988, 1997, 2002, 2011, 2022
- Henry VIII – 1961, 1986, 2004, 2019

Tragedies

- Troilus and Cressida – 1963, 1987, 2003
- Coriolanus – 1961, 1981, 1997, 2006, 2018
- Titus Andronicus – 1978, 1980, 1989, 2000, 2011
- Romeo and Juliet – 1960, 1968, 1977, 1984, 1987, 1992, 1997, 2002, 2008, 2013, 2017, 2021, 2024
- Timon of Athens – 1963, 1991, 2004, 2017
- Julius Caesar – 1955, 1965, 1978, 1982, 1990, 1998, 2009, 2018
- Macbeth – 1962, 1971, 1978, 1983, 1986, 1990, 1995, 1999, 2004, 2009, 2016, 2025
- Hamlet – 1957, 1969, 1976, 1986, 1991, 1994, 2000, 2008, 2015, 2022
- King Lear – 1964, 1971, 1979, 1980, 1985, 1988, 1996, 2002, 2007, 2014, 2023
- Othello – 1959, 1973, 1979, 1987, 1994, 2007, 2013, 2019, 2026
- Antony and Cleopatra – 1967, 1976, 1993, 2003, 2014
- Cymbeline – 1970, 1986, 2004, 2012, 2024

Note: All 3 parts of Henry VI were performed in 1966 and 1980 in an abridged version. In 2002, using the Barton/Hall method of combining 1 Henry VI with the first half of 2 Henry VI, and the second half of 2 Henry VI with 3 Henry VI, the plays were renamed Henry VI: Revenge in France and Henry VI: Revolt in England. In 2016, "Richard II" and "1 Henry IV" were combined as were "2 Henry IV" and "Henry V". The Plays were renamed "Breath of Kings: Rebellion" and "Breath of Kings: Redemption".

== Works by other authors produced three times or more ==
- Alice Through the Looking-Glass – 1994, 1996, 2014
- The Cherry Orchard – 1965, 1987, 1998
- Cyrano de Bergerac – 1962/1963, 1994, 2009
- The Gondoliers – 1962, 1983/1984, 1995
- Guys and Dolls – 1990, 2004, 2017, 2026
- H.M.S. Pinafore – 1960, 1981, 1992, 2017
- The Importance of Being Earnest – 1975/1976, 1979, 1993, 2009, 2026
- Long Day's Journey into Night – 1980, 1994/1995, 2018
- The Mikado – 1963, 1982/1983/1984, 1993
- The Music Man – 1996, 2008, 2018
- Oedipus Rex – 1954/1955, 1988, 1997, 2015
- The Pirates of Penzance – 1961/1962, 1985, 1994, 2012
- Private Lives – 1978, 2001, 2019
- The School for Scandal – 1970, 1987, 1999, 2017
- She Stoops to Conquer – 1972/1973, 1985, 2015
- Tartuffe – 1968/1969, 1983/1984, 2000, 2017
- The Three Musketeers – 1968, 1988, 2000, 2013
- Waiting for Godot – 1968, 1984, 1996, 1998, 2013, 2026
