= Colin George =

Welsh actor and director (1929–2016)

Colin George (20 September 1929 – 15 October 2016) was a Welsh actor and director, who was the founding Artistic Director of the Crucible Theatre in Sheffield (1971).

Colin George was also a member of the Royal Shakespeare Company during the years 1994–1999, in plays such as Peer Gynt, Coriolanus, Measure for Measure, The Merchant of Venice and The Tempest and a stage musical adaptation of the French film Les Enfants du Paradis. Television work has included The Doctors in 2005.

George also directed many plays including Antony and Cleopatra and A Man For All Seasons, Richard III, Autumn Crocus, The Merchant of Venice, The Chairs and The Persians, The Boy Friend and The Heiress and The Stirrings in Sheffield on Saturday Night.

He died on 15 October 2016 at the age of 87.

== Early life ==
Colin George was born in Pembroke Dock, Wales. His father was a Congregational minister from a coalmining family in the Rhondda Valley; his mother was the star of Tenby’s local amateur operatic society. George was interested in acting from a young age, inspired by his hero, Sir Laurence Olivier, and encouraged by his mother and her brother, Harold. George went to boarding school in Caterham, Surrey, and in 1949 – after completing two years’ national service – he went up to University College Oxford to read English. At university he was heavily involved in amateur dramatics, writing, directing and acting in numerous shows and reviews.

== Early career (1952–1962) ==
After completing his degree in 1952, George teamed up his with friend, Paul Almond, and a group of aspiring actors from Cambridge University—among them John Barton, Toby Robertson and Peter Hall—to create the Oxford and Cambridge Players (this later became the Elizabethan Theatre Company). George toured England with the company for three years, acting and directing in numerous Shakespeare plays. His roles included Petruchio, Romeo, Cassius, Bassanio and Henry V, the latter being performed at the Old Vic and recorded in a live performance for the BBC in 1953.

In 1955, the Company disbanded and George acted in a number of theatres, including one season at the Coventry Rep, before joining the Birmingham Rep in April 1956, the same day as another young actor, Albert Finney. In 1958, George joined the Nottingham Playhouse as Assistant Director to Val May, where he was a driving force in bringing work by new playwrights to the theatre, including Arnold Wesker, John Osborne and Harold Pinter. George also directed outside Nottingham, in 1961 taking productions of ‘A Man for All Seasons’ and ‘Macbeth’ with John Neville in both lead roles to the Manoel Theatre in Malta. He also worked in London, creating the role of Jack Lucas in Keith Waterhouse & Willis Hall’s ‘Celebration’ at the Duchess Theatre (1961), and directing Paul Daneman in ‘Richard III’ at the Old Vic (1962).

== Sheffield (1962–1974) ==
In 1962 George was appointed Assistant Director of the Sheffield Playhouse, rising to Artistic Director in 1965. Under George’s tenure the Playhouse moved to performing in true repertoire, introduced new and controversial playwrights to Sheffield audiences, and created a children’s theatre company, Theatre Vanguard, which took plays and improvisation into schools across Sheffield. George’s championing of children’s theatre led to his appointment as one of the original members of the Arts Council Panel for Young People’s Theatre.

In August 1966 it was announced that the Sheffield Playhouse would get a new theatre, and George was a leading force in the creation of what was to become the Crucible Theatre. He worked closely with the theatre director Sir Tyrone Guthrie and designer Tanya Moiseiwitsch to create a radical thrust stage auditorium. The controversial design aroused fierce opposition from Sheffield’s conservative quarters and the so-called ‘Three Knights’: Sir Bernard Miles, Sir Laurence Olivier & Sir John Clements. But it also galvanised a new generation of actors, directors, designers and playwrights who launched a passionate defence of the thrust stage, among them Michael Elliott, Peter Cheeseman, Keith Waterhouse, David Campton, David Rudkin and Alan Ayckbourn. George served as the Crucible’s Artistic Director from its opening in November 1971 to July 1974.

During this period, George also directed productions outside Sheffield. He was Artistic Director of the Ludlow Festival (1964–66), and directed productions abroad, including ‘Romeo & Juliet’ at the Boško Buha Theatre, Belgrade (April 1969), ‘Vatzlav’ at the Festival Theatre, Stratford, Ontario (April 1970), ‘The Hostage’ at the NAC, Ottawa (January 1971), ‘Playboy of the Western World’ at the Abbey Theatre, Dublin (April 1971) and ‘The Duchess of Malfi’ at the Warsaw Palace of Culture (June 1973).

== Australia and Hong Kong (1975–1992) ==
One month after leaving the Crucible, in August 1974 George appeared in ten episodes of Coronation Street as Jimmy Graham, Rita Littlewood’s love interest. The story of a married man having an affair with one of the show’s stars stirred up so much interest in the press that he was one of the first actors in England to be harassed by Corrie fans who were outraged by his on-screen behaviour.

In 1975, George took up the post of Head of Drama at the University of New England in Armidale, New South Wales, and the following year was offered the artistic directorship of the Adelaide State Theatre Company, which he ran from 1976–80. While at Adelaide, George directed some of the rising generation of Australian actors, among them Judy Davis, Colin Friels, Mel Gibson and Michael Siberry, as well as a production of ‘Oedipus’ (1978) designed by Tanya Moiseiwitsch.

After a short spell as Artistic Director of the Leicester Haymarket Theatre (1980–81), George joined the Anglo-Chinese Chung Ying Theatre Company in Hong Kong as an actor, later taking over as Artistic Director. In 1985 he was appointed Head of Drama at the new Hong Kong Academy for Performing Arts, where he spent eight years and was influential in the development of many of the current generation of Hong Kong actors and directors. While at the Academy, George toured his Chinese-language production of Euripides’ ‘The Bacchae’ to Beijing and Shanghai.

== Later years (1993–2016) ==
In 1993 George returned to England to resume his career as an actor and the following year joined the Royal Shakespeare Company, where he spent two seasons (1994–1996 and 1997–1999). His roles included Aragon in The Merchant of Venice and Alonso in The Tempest, as well as understudying the leads in both plays, and Angelo in Measure for Measure. His other productions included ‘Peer Gynt’ at the Young Vic and Simon Callow's production of Les Enfants du Paradis at the Barbican.

After leaving the RSC, George toured a number of shows around the country, most of which premiered at the Edinburgh Festival Fringe, including Me and Shakespeare, Image of an Actor, The Black Monk, Lying for a Living, Shakespeare’s London and in 1999 with My Son—Will! at Venue 40 The Quaker Meeting House, Edinburgh.

George also acted in touring shows, playing the roles of Polonius and the Gravedigger in Hamlet with the Oxford Stage Company in 1996 and Underwood in Alan Bennett's The Lady and the Van at the Birmingham Rep in 2000–01. In 2002, he was awarded a Joseph Rowntree Fellowship to write and tour a show about the life of George Fox, founder of the Quakers. George also had a number of television and film roles (see section below).

In 2011 George was invited by the Artistic Director of the Crucible Theatre, Daniel Evans, to join the company for the 40th anniversary production of Othello, in which he played the roles of Brabantio and Gratiano. This production was to be his last professional role performed on the stage he had created.

Following Othello, George produced the first draft of a book about his experience of designing and building the Crucible Theatre, before his death on 15 October 2016 at the age of 87. In 2020 his son, Tedd, edited the manuscript into a book – Stirring Up Sheffield: An insider's account of the battle to build the Crucible Theatre – which was published by Wordville Press in November 2021, and won the Society for Theatre Research's 2022 Theatre Book Prize.

== TV and film ==
- Passage (2008)
- Doctors (2005)
- Afterlife (2005)
- Soldier Soldier (1992)
- Once Upon a Time in China (1991)
- Shadow of China (1989)
- Ladykillers, Granada TV (1980)
- South Australian Theatre Company's production of Macbeth by William Shakespeare, with narration by Colin George (1977)
- Poldark (1975)
- The Hanged Man (1975)
- Coronation Street (1974)

== Publications ==
- ‘Stirring Up Sheffield: An insider’s account of the battle to build the Crucible Theatre’, co-author with his son Tedd George, Wordville Press, November 2021.
- 神火 Deadly Ecstasy, by Euripides, adapted by Colin George, The Chinese University of Hong Kong Press, 2005.
- 雨後彩虹 Look for the Rainbow, Mystery cycle plays, adapted by Colin George, The Chinese University of Hong Kong Press, 2005.
- The Stirrings in Sheffield on Saturday night; introductions by Alan Cullen and Colin George, foreword by John Hodgson, Alan Cullen, Eyre Methuen (London), 1974.

== Personal life ==
Colin George was married three times. His wives were Patricia Voysey (1956–1967), Dorothy Vernon (1967–1990) and Sue George (1992–2016). He had one child from his first marriage (Gwendolyn) and three children from his second (Caroline, Lucy & Tedd).

George became a Quaker while in Australia in the late 1970s. His involvement with the Quakers in Hong Kong led to him volunteering in the Vietnamese refugee camps, where he ran a drama club for children there, as he had with the Pegasus Theatre Club at the Sheffield Playhouse in the early 1960s. It was through the Quakers that George met his third wife, Sue, whom he married in 1992.
