= David William =

British Canadian actor and director

- Born: 24 June 1926; London, England
- Died: 28 July 2010 (aged 84)

David William (24 June 1926 – 28 July 2010) was a British Canadian actor and director.

He was born Bryan David Williams in London, the only child of Eric Williams and Olwen Roose. His family was London-based wine merchants. He was educated at Bryanston School and University College, Oxford. He played Prospero in an outdoor production of The Tempest in the gardens of Worcester College, directed by Nevill Coghill in 1949. He also acted as Hamlet and Richard II in Oxford University Dramatic Society productions. Upon joining Equity, the actor's trade union, he dropped the "s" in his name.

He was artistic director at the New Shakespeare Company at the Open Air Theatre in London, England, from 1962 to 1968, and artistic director of the Stratford Festival in Stratford, Ontario, Canada, from 1990 to 1993. During his tenure at Stratford, the Festival produced works by Canadian playwrights Elliott Hayes, Sharon Pollock, Michel Tremblay, and John Murrell. He died on 28 July 2010 from injuries he suffered in a fall.

== See also ==
- List of Stratford Festival productions during William's tenure
