= Atlantic Theatre Festival =

The Festival Theatre in March, 2007.

The Atlantic Theatre Festival (ATF) was a professional theatre company located in Wolfville, Nova Scotia, Canada. The Theatre Festival presented a "broad range of critically acclaimed theatre classics" during the summer in Wolfville's Festival Theatre, the former town hockey arena that was converted into a 504 seat, thrust stage theatre and professional production facility by the Atlantic Theatre Festival Society (a non-profit charity).

== History ==
Over two million dollars was contributed by the local, Nova Scotian, and Canadian governments to create the Festival Theatre. Stratford Festival veteran Michael Langham was among the directors who brought national acclaim to the festival during the Founder's Season of 1995. The reputation of the festival grew over the following seasons as it attracted the likes of Megan Follows, Christopher Plummer, and area native Peter Donat to join its company. In later years, despite originally being conceived as a classical repertory, the festival maintained its critical success as it began to include works by Canadian playwrights as well as family-friendly musicals.

Despite a strong critical reputation, mounting debts over the first five years forced the Atlantic Theatre Festival to reduce cast sizes, lay-off crew, and cancel productions. The construction of the Festival Theatre initially came as a result of a twenty-year (dollar-a-year) lease from Acadia University. In 2002, this agreement was terminated and a new lease was offered that reduced the professional theatre company to a seasonal tenant. This arrangement threatened the Atlantic Theatre Festival's existence, causing the cancellation of the 2004 season. The festival theatre stage remained dark in 2005, but had a successful renewal in 2006. With one main stage production and comedic readings to form the "Summer of Laughter" season both audiences and tourists returned. The financial success did not continue the following season as the festival returned to a multi-play format. In August 2007, artistic director Nigel Bennett was forced to resign mid-season after the Board of Directors informed him that sufficient funds were not available to continue. One production completed its run while two others, one on stage and the other in rehearsal, were cancelled. A lack of funding from both provincial and federal levels was named as the main cause of the closure.

Currently, the Festival Theatre is used for the Acadia University Performing Arts Series, which are held throughout the University school year, and for conferences.

== Artistic Directors ==
- Nigel Bennett (2006–2007)
- Jerry Etienne (1999–2004)
- Michael Bawtree (1995–1998)

== Production history ==
2007

- Shirley Valentine by Willy Russell
- The Drawer Boy by Michael Healey
- A Midsummer Night's Dream by William Shakespeare (Unstaged; season cancelled during rehearsal process)

2006

- Noises Off by Michael Frayn

2003

- Into the Woods by Stephen Sondheim and James Lapine
- Blithe Spirit by Noël Coward
- Three Sisters by Anton Chekhov

2002

- Charley's Aunt by Brandon Thomas
- The Taming of the Shrew by William Shakespeare
- The Miracle Worker by William Gibson

2001

- The Hobbit adapted by Kim Selody
- A Streetcar Named Desire by Tennessee Williams
- Billy Bishop Goes to War by John Gray and Eric Peterson

2000

- Amadeus by Peter Shaffer
- High Notes: A Musical Revue by Jerry Etienne
- Private Lives by Noël Coward
- Macbeth by William Shakespeare
- Billy Bishop Goes to War by John Gray and Eric Peterson

1999

- Hedda Gabler by Henrik Ibsen
- The Constant Wife by W. Somerset Maugham
- The Boar Hog and The Pregnant Pause by Georges Feydeau

1998

- Othello by William Shakespeare
- Pygmalion by George Bernard Shaw
- The Matchmaker by Thornton Wilder
- Sam Slick Goes Ahead by Andrew Gillis

1997

- Tartuffe by Molière
- The Importance of Being Earnest by Oscar Wilde
- Uncle Vanya by Anton Chekhov

1996

- Twelfth Night by William Shakespeare
- She Stoops to Conquer by Oliver Goldsmith
- A Doll's House by Henrik Ibsen

1995

- The Tempest by William Shakespeare
- The Cherry Orchard by Anton Chekhov
- A Flea in Her Ear by Georges Feydeau
