= Michael Bawtree =

Canadian actor, director, author and educator (1937–2024)

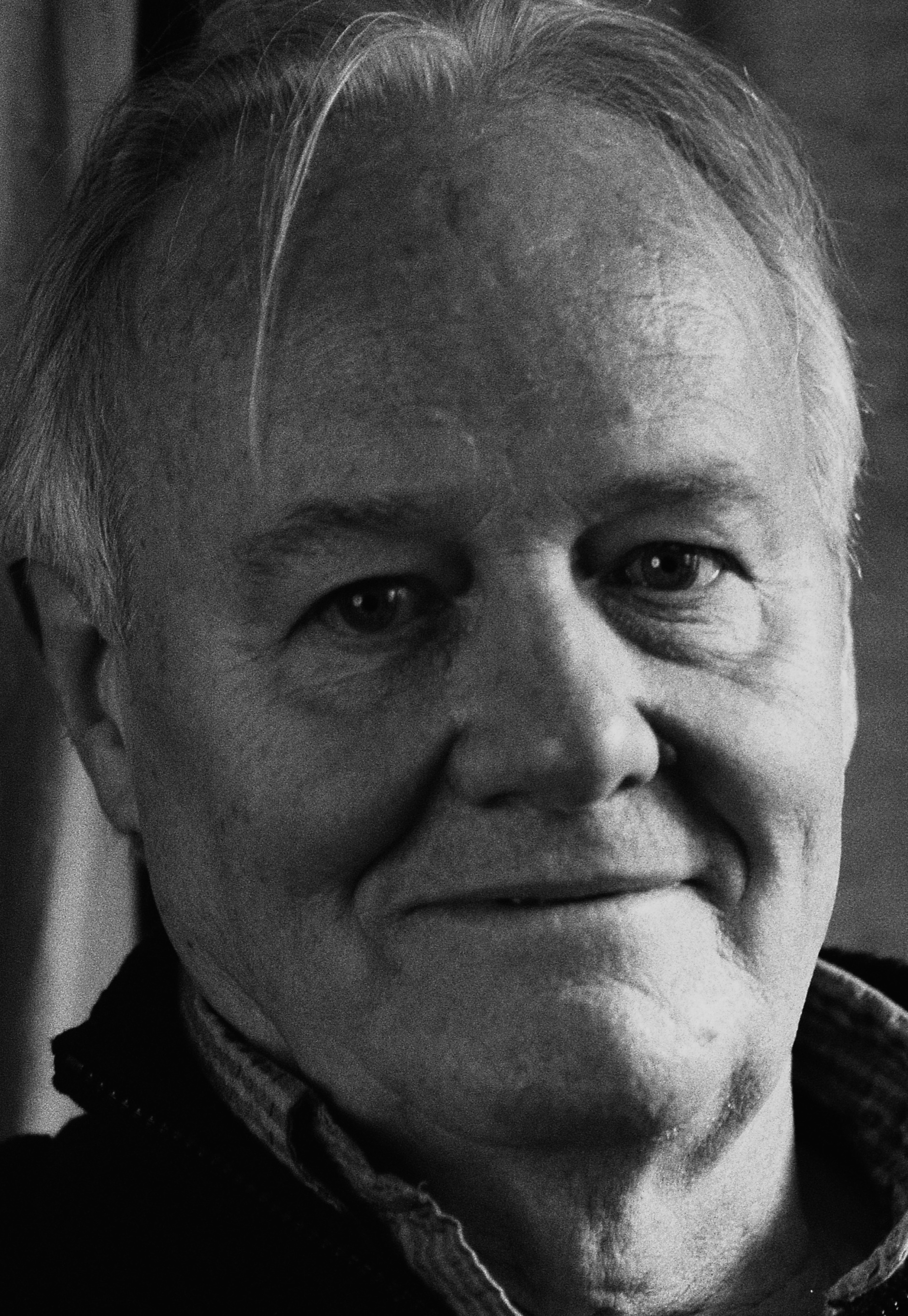
- Bawtree in 2008
- Born: 25 August 1937; Newcastle, New South Wales, Australia
- Died: 24 August 2024 (aged 86)
- Occupations: Actor, director, author, educator

Michael Bawtree (25 August 1937 – 24 August 2024) was a Canadian actor, director, author and educator.

== Early life and education ==
Bawtree was born in Australia, brought up in England and educated at Radley College. After two years of National Service (commissioned into the Oxfordshire and Buckinghamshire Light Infantry and serving in Cyprus), he read English Language and Literature at Worcester College, Oxford, leaving with a B.A. in 1961 (M.A. 1963).

== Career ==
=== Early career in Canada ===
Bawtree emigrated to Canada in 1962, and acted on stage and television in Toronto for three years. He also taught for one year at Victoria College, University of Toronto, and working as dramaturge at the Stratford Shakespeare Festival, Stratford, Ontario, for the 1964 season, under Michael Langham. After serving as the Toronto Telegram's book critic for six months in 1965, he resigned to take up a position at the newly formed Simon Fraser University, Burnaby, British Columbia, as Resident in Theatre. There, he was responsible for founding the university's theatre program. He held the position for four years, resigning in 1969.

In 1966 he returned to the Stratford Festival, being commissioned to write a play for the company. His The Last of the Tsars premiered at the Avon Theatre, Stratford, in July 1966, and was directed by Michael Langham and starred William Hutt, Amelia Hall and Tony van Bridge. In 1967, on receiving a Canada Council travel and study bursary, he went to live for eight months in Cali, Colombia, where he learned Spanish, wrote poetry and worked at the Teatro Experimental di Cali under its artistic director Enrique Buenaventura.

Returning to Ontario in 1969, Bawtree assisted Michael Langham on his 1970 production of The School for Scandal, and was then appointed as Director of English Theatre at the National Arts Centre in Ottawa. He resigned the next year after Jean Gascon offered him the post of Literary Manager and Assistant to the Director at the Stratford Festival. That year he first directed at the Shaw Festival, Niagara-on-the-Lake. At Stratford, he also became director of Stratford's Third Stage, where he initiated four seasons of theatre and music theatre productions, including Patria II: Requiems for a Party Girl by R. Murray Schafer (1971), starring Phyllis Mailing, The Red Convertible by Buenaventura, and The Medium of Menotti (1974), starring Maureen Forrester. In 1972 he directed Oliver Goldsmith's She Stoops To Conquer on the Stratford Festival's main stage; it was revived for the 1973 season, televised by CBC in 1974, and broadcast in 1975.

Bawtree was appointed an Associate Director of the Festival in 1973, but resigned from Stratford in 1974. He lived in New York City for a year, directing two off-Broadway productions, and directing also in Cincinnati, Westport, and the Guthrie Theatre, Minneapolis. For the Guthrie he also wrote a television adaptation of The School for Scandal, directed by Michael Langham for PBS-TV.

=== Later career ===
In 1975, back in Toronto, he founded COMUS Music Theatre with Maureen Forrester. For COMUS he co-wrote and directed Harry's Back In Town in 1976, and directed The Medium in 1978. He also directed The Beggar's Opera for the Guelph Spring Festival in 1976. In 1978 he became Director of the Banff School of Fine Arts summer musical theatre training program, which he ran until 1983. In 1979 he moved to Banff to become Arts Planner and Director of Inter Arts for the newly established Winter Cycle of arts programs.

In 1981 he founded the Music Theatre Studio Ensemble at Banff, a training program for actors, singer, designers, writers and composers. The program achieved international notice, and he was made a member of the International Theatre Institute's Music Theatre Committee, whose meetings and seminars took him over the next years to the USSR, France, Hungary, Norway, Sweden, Czechoslovakia, Cuba, East Germany and Turkey.

Bawtree resigned from the Banff School – by now renamed The Banff Centre – in 1986, and for three years worked freelance, while also completing his book on music theatre, The New Singing Theatre.

In 1988 he was invited to Finland to direct the Finnish language premiere of Oh! What a Lovely War [Sota On Mahtava!], in Tampere. This was the first of many visits to Finland, where over the next years he directed student-professional productions, including Working in Tampere and Albert Herring at the Sibelius Academy. He also co-directed two music theatre training programs, and in 1992 directed 70, Girls, 70 (Kevättä Rinnassa) at Tampereenteatteri. He was also one of the founders of Sumute, a Finnish music theatre company.

In 1989 he was commissioned to write a one-woman play for Quebec actor and chanteuse Monique Leyrac. The play, Sarah Bernhardt and the Beast, premiered in Montreal, and toured in English and French through Ontario and Quebec 1989–90.

In 1990 he was invited to be Director of Drama at Acadia University, Wolfville, Nova Scotia, a position he held until his retirement in 2003, teaching acting and directing many student productions of classics, including plays of Shakespeare, Chekhov and Brecht.

In 1994 he founded the Atlantic Theatre Festival, overseeing the conversion of Acadia University's disused ice rink into a 500-seat thrust stage theatre. With major support from Christopher Plummer, the festival opened in 1995, and Bawtree served as its artistic director for the first four years. He parted company with the festival in 1998. In 2017, Acadia University named the Festival Theatre stage the 'Bawtree Bernhardt Festival Stage', in honour of Michael and his Acadia University colleague Colin Bernhardt.

In 2003 he founded the Joseph Howe Initiative, to celebrate in 2004 the 200th birthday of Joseph Howe, Nova Scotia's greatest son. He performed as Joseph Howe on several occasions in 2004, including in a version of Howe's famous defence against a charge of seditious libel in 1835, and in a CBC-TV documentary on Howe. He also wrote a young adult's novel, Joe Howe to the Rescue, to introduce Howe to the young generation. In 2008 he appeared as Joseph Howe on many occasions for Democracy250, an initiative set up by the Province of Nova Scotia to celebrate the birth of Canadian democracy in Nova Scotia in 1758. These performances took him all over Nova Scotia, as well as to Ottawa, Boston and London UK.

In recent years he toured in Nova Scotia and the UK with readings of A Christmas Carol and Three Men in a Boat, and in the UK with his own one-man show The Pegasus Bridge Show, raising money for charity.

== Personal life ==
From 1967 Bawtree lived with his partner the voice and speech teacher Colin Bernhardt, who died in 2012.

Bawtree lived in Wolfville, Nova Scotia, where he published two volumes of memoirs (2015 and 2017), and later worked on a final volume. He died on 24 August 2024, at the age of 86.

== Awards ==
- Queen Elizabeth II Golden Jubilee Medal (2002) for services to the community.
- Awarded Honorary Doctor of Letters by Acadia University (2022)

== Publications ==
As author

- The Last of the Tsars 1972 (Clarke Irwin, Toronto)
- The New Singing Theatre 1990 (Bristol Classical Press, UK and OUP New York 1990)
- Joe Howe to the Rescue 2004 (Nimbus Publishing, Halifax)
- As Far As I Remember 2015 (Mereo Books UK and Like No Other Press, Wolfville)
- The Best Fooling 2017 (Mereo Books UK and Like No Other Press, Wolfville)
- The Pegasus Bridge Show book version 2021 (Mereo Books UK and Like No Other Press, Wolfville)

As contributor

- The State of the Language ed. Christopher Ricks and Leonard Michaels 1990 (Faber)
- Something Like Fire: Peter Cook Remembered ed. Lin Cook 1995 (Methuen, London)
- William Hutt: Masks and Faces 1995 ed. Keith Garebian (Mosaic Press, Buffalo)
- Today's Joe Howe 2004 (Joseph Howe Initiative, Halifax)

As editor

- Remembering Colin: a Gathering of Poems for Colin Bernhardt 2013 (Like No Other Press, Wolfville)

As playwright

- The Last of the Tsars (Stratford Festival 1966)
- Sarah Bernhardt and the Beast (Montreal 1989), commissioned for Monique Leyrac
- Joseph Howe's Libel Speech of 1835 (adapted and performed, Halifax, Boston) 2004, 2005
- The Pegasus Bridge Show (UK Tour 2008)

As translator

- The Red Convertible (Stratford, 1971)
- An Italian Straw Hat (Stratford 1971)
- Orphée II (Stratford 1972)

As librettist

- Drummer with composer/lyricist David Warrack (Banff 1981, toured Alberta)
- Peking Dust with composer Stephen McNeff (Banff 1981)
- The Music Theatre Machine with composer Richard Thomas (Banff 1982, 1983, 1984. Toured Texas 1989)

== Selected productions ==
- Summer Days (Director Shaw Festival) 1971, starring Jack Creley and Eric House (English premiere)
- The Red Convertible (Director Stratford Third Stage) 1971 (English premiere), starring Mari Gorman
- She Stoops To Conquer (Director Stratford Festival Stage) 1972, 1973
- Patria II: Requiems for a Party Girl – opera (Director, Stratford Third Stage) 1972 (premiere)
- Exiles – opera (Director, Stratford Third Stage) 1973 (premiere)
- Love's Labour's Lost (Director, Stratford Festival Theatre) 1974
- Everyman – opera (Director, Stratford Third Stage) 1974 (premiere)
- The Medium – opera (Director, Stratford Third Stage) 1974, starring Maureen Forrester
- The Rivals (Director, Roundabout Theatre NYC) 1975, starring Christopher Hewett
- Tartuffe (Director, Guthrie Theatre Minneapolis) 1975, starring Ken Ruta
- In Praise of Love (Director, Westport County Playhouse) 1975, starring Tammy Grimes
- By Bernstein – musical revue (Director, Chelsea Theater Group NYC) 1975 (premiere)
- What The Butler Saw (Director, Cincinnati Playhouse) 1976
- The Beggar's Opera (Director, Guelph Spring Festival) 1976
- Harry's Back In Town – musical (Director, COMUS Music Theatre, Toronto) 1976, starring Martin Short (premiere)
- The Telephone and The Old Maid and the Thief – operas (Director Algoma Fall Festival) 1978
- The Medium – opera (Director, COMUS Music Theatre) 1977, starring Maureen Forrester
- The Eye of the Beholder – music theatre (Director, Canadian Electronic Ensemble/COMUS Music Theatre) 1980 (premiere)
- Sarah Bernhardt and the Beast (Director and Author, Montreal Productions) 1989 starring Monique Leyrac (premiere)
- Kevättä Rinnassa – musical (Director, Tampereenteatteri, Finland) 1992 (Finnish premiere
- A Flea In Her Ear (Director, Atlantic Theatre Festival, Nova Scotia) 1995
- She Stoops To Conquer (Director, Atlantic Theatre Festival, Nova Scotia) 1996
- Love Letters (Director, Atlantic Theatre Festival, Nova Scotia) 1996, with Peter Donat
- Tartuffe (Director, Atlantic Theatre Festival, Nova Scotia) 1997
- The Matchmaker (Director, Atlantic Theatre Festival, Nova Scotia) 1998
- Sam Slick Goes Ahead (Director, Atlantic Theatre Festival) 1998 (premiere)

In addition to these professional productions, Bawtree has directed over thirty productions with students and young professionals, at Simon Fraser University, The Banff Centre, Acadia University and in Finland.

== Work for television ==
- Poetry for Schools (Host, series of 6, CBC Children's TV) 1964
- Introduction to the United Nations (Host, series of 4, CBC Children's TV) 1965
- The School for Scandal (Adaptation for TV, Director Michael Langham PBS/Guthrie Theatre) 1974
- She Stoops To Conquer (Director with Norman Campbell, CBC-TV/Stratford Festival) 1975
- Messe pour Le Temps Présent (Translation and recitation of text danced by Ballet du XXième Siècle for Maurice Béjart. Radio-Canada TV) 1975
- The Medium (Director, CBC-TV/COMUS Music Theatre) starring Maureen Forrester 1978
- The Great Joe Howe (Performer, CBC-TV) 2004
