= The Police (play) =

- Original language: Polish
- Written by: Sławomir Mrożek
- Characters: Chief of police Sergeant; Sergeant's wife General; Policeman; Prisoner
- Genre: grotesque drama

Premiere
- Date: 27 June 1958
- Place: Warsaw, Polish People's Republic

The Police is a play written by Polish playwright Sławomir Mrożek.

Written in 1958, it is Mrozek's first play and one of his most acclaimed early works. Written in the style of Theatre of the Absurd, and listed in the Martin Esslin book of the same name, it was produced at the Phoenix Theatre in New York in 1961. A television production was aired in the United States in 1971 by PBS. It was directed by Christopher Loscher in 2007 at the Battersea Arts Centre in London as part of the TimeOut Critics' Choice season.

The play takes place in a mythical country where all opposition to the state has disappeared and the last remaining political prisoner is to be released. Rather than face the prospect of retiring the police force, the chief of police decides to create an enemy of the state by ordering one of his officers to commit political crimes. The absurdity of the play culminates when the characters mutually arrest each other repeatedly, in an attempt to restore order and meaning to their world.
