= The Last of the Tsars =

Play by Michael Bawtree

The Last of the Tsars is a play by Michael Bawtree. The action takes place in Russia between 1912 and 1919, and follows the fortunes of the Romanov family and of Russia in the tumultuous years leading up to the Revolution of 1917, and beyond, to the assassination of the Romanov family by the Bolsheviks. The story is told through the eyes of Tsar Nicholas's brother Grand Duke Michael, who had been exiled from Russia by the Tsar in 1912 when he married a divorcee. Michael was called back to Russia at the outbreak of the First World War, where he served in the Russian Army. When Tsar Nicholas abdicated in March 1917, he did so in favour of Grand Duke Michael, who himself abdicated some 48 hours later. So Michael was in fact 'the last of the Tsars.' The play was commissioned by the Stratford Festival, Stratford, Ontario, Canada, in the spring of 1966, after another play on the same subject, "Nicholas Romanov" by William Kinsolving, had been tried out by the Stratford Festival Company at the Manitoba Theatre Centre in February, 1966, and found insufficiently dramatic. In spite of the shared general theme, the two plays are distinctly different works.

The Last of the Tsars opened at the Avon Theatre, Stratford Festival on July 12, 1966. It was directed by Stratford's artistic director Michael Langham, and designed by Leslie Hurry, with music by Louis Applebaum, and featured many of the leading actors of the Festival Company. Grand Duke Michael was played by William Hutt; the Tsar by Joel Kenyon; the Tsarina by Amelia Hall; Rasputin by Powys Thomas; and Samoilov, the revolutionary who fights Grand Duke Michael for control of the play, by Tony Van Bridge. Michael's wife Natalie Sergeevna was played by Kim Yaroshevskaya, and his manservant Johnson was played by Barry MacGregor. The production received generally very favourable notices, and ran for 22 performances.

The script of The Last of the Tsars was published by Clarke, Irwin, Toronto, in 1973, with an introduction by the distinguished scholar Clifford Leech, who described it as "the most sensitively written Canadian play that I have seen."
