= Blake (monologue) =

Blake is a monologue by Elliott Hayes. It is based on the life of the English poet William Blake and infused with poetry from Blake's Songs of Innocence and Experience. Performances include:

- The Writers' Theater (1996)
- The 1983 Stratford Festival of Canada
