= The Blonde, the Brunette and the Vengeful Redhead =

- Author: Robert Hewett
- Cover artist: Kate Florance
- Language: English
- Genre: Play
- Publisher: Currency Press
- Publication date: 2007
- Publication place: Australia
- Media type: Print (Paperback)
- ISBN: 978-0-86819-806-4

The Blonde, the Brunette and the Vengeful Redhead is a one-woman play by Australian playwright Robert Hewett. It is presented as a series of eight individual monologues by seven characters who were affected by the actions of Rhonda Russell, the first character in the play. It was published by Currency Press in 2007.

The play was premiered at the Stables Theatre in Sydney, Australia in 2004. It was later produced at other theatres in Australia, New Zealand, Switzerland, Canada, USA, Mexico, Germany, Austria, Italy, Ireland, Zimbabwe, Taiwan and Greece.

== Synopsis ==
An adulterous husband, a meddlesome neighbour and a dropped ice-cream cone are among the circumstances that combine to shatter the life of suburban housewife Rhonda Russell.

Everyone has their own story to tell about the day that Rhonda went berserk in the shopping mall. And who's to know where the truth lies? With the best friend who might have egged her on? With the husband who denies responsibility? Or with the victim's family whose lives were changed forever? And then there's the story of the vengeful redhead herself, but she's probably the least likely to know what really happened.

In this gripping adventure, the world is turned upside down in a disastrous and comic sequence of events. As the intrigue unfolds, seven different characters give a fresh twist of perspective – all played by one multifaceted performer.

== First production ==
The Blonde, the Brunette and the Vengeful Redhead was first produced by Stewart D'Arrietta for Saxophone Productions at the Stables Theatre, Sydney, on 26 February 2004 with the following participants:

- Performer: Jacki Weaver
- Director: Jennifer Hagan
- Assistant Director: Sean Taylor
- Designer: Laurence Eastwood
- Lighting Designer: Peter Neufeld
- Sound Designer: Wei Han Liao
- Composer: Stewart D'Arrietta
