= Sławomir Mrożek =

Polish playwright (1930–2013)

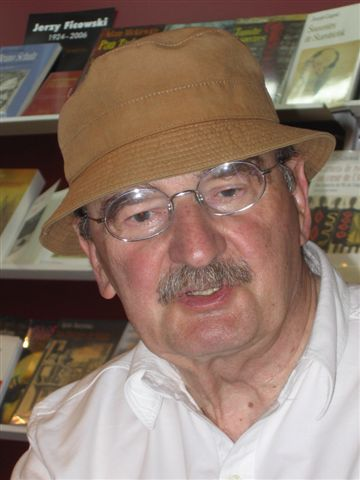
- Mrożek in 2006
- Born: 29 June 1930; Borzęcin, Poland
- Died: 15 August 2013 (aged 83); Nice, France
- Citizenship: Polish, French
- Occupation: Playwright
- Writing career
- Notable works: Tango; The Police
- Notable awards: Kościelski Award (1962); Austrian State Prize for European Literature (1972); Legion of Honour (2003); Grand Cross of the Order of Polonia Restituta (2013)

Sławomir Mrożek (Polish pronunciation: [swaˈvɔmir ˈmrɔʐɛk]; 29 June 1930 – 15 August 2013) was a Polish playwright.

Mrożek joined the Polish United Workers' Party during the reign of Stalinism in the People's Republic of Poland, and made a living as a political journalist. He began writing plays in the late 1950s. His theatrical works belong to the genre of absurdist fiction, intended to shock the audience with non-realistic elements, political and historic references, distortion, and parody.

In 1963 he emigrated to Italy and France, then further to Mexico. In 1996 he returned to Poland and settled in Kraków. In 2008 he moved back to France. He died in Nice at the age of 83.

== Life and career ==
=== Postwar period ===
Mrożek's family lived in Kraków during World War II. He finished high school in 1949 and in 1950 debuted as a political hack-writer on Przekrój. In 1952 he moved into the government-run Writer's House (ZLP headquarters with the restricted canteen). In 1953, during the Stalinist terror in postwar Poland, Mrożek was one of several signatories of an open letter from ZLP to Polish authorities supporting the persecution of Polish religious leaders imprisoned by the Ministry of Public Security. He participated in the defamation of Catholic priests from Kraków, three of whom were condemned to death by the Communist government in February 1953 after being groundlessly accused of treason (see the Stalinist show trial of the Kraków Curia). Their death sentences were not enforced, although Father Józef Fudali died in unexplained circumstances while in prison. Mrożek wrote a full-page article for the leading newspaper in support of the verdict, entitled "Zbrodnia główna i inne" (The Capital Crime and Others), comparing death-row priests to degenerate SS-men and Ku-Klux-Klan killers. He married Maria Obremba living in Katowice and relocated to Warsaw in 1959. In 1963 Mrożek travelled to Italy with his wife and decided to defect together. After five years in Italy, he moved to France and in 1978 received French citizenship.

After his defection, Mrożek turned critical of the Polish communist regime. Later, from the safety of his residence in France, he also protested publicly against the 1968 Warsaw Pact invasion of Czechoslovakia. Long after the collapse of the Soviet empire, he commented thus on his fascination with Communism:

Being twenty years old, I was ready to accept any ideological proposition without looking a gift-horse in the mouth – as long as it was revolutionary. [...] I was lucky not to be born German say in 1913. I would have been a Hitlerite because the recruitment method was the same.

His first wife, Maria Obremba, died in 1969. In 1987 he married Susana Osorio-Mrozek, a Mexican woman. In 1996, he relocated back to Poland and settled in Kraków. He had a stroke in 2002, resulting in aphasia, which took several years to cure. He left Poland again in 2008, and moved to Nice in southern France. Sławomir Mrożek died in Nice on 15 August 2013. Not a religious person by any means, on 17 September 2013 he was buried at the St. Peter and Paul Church in Kraków. The funeral mass was conducted by the Archbishop of Kraków, Cardinal Stanisław Dziwisz.

=== Literary career ===
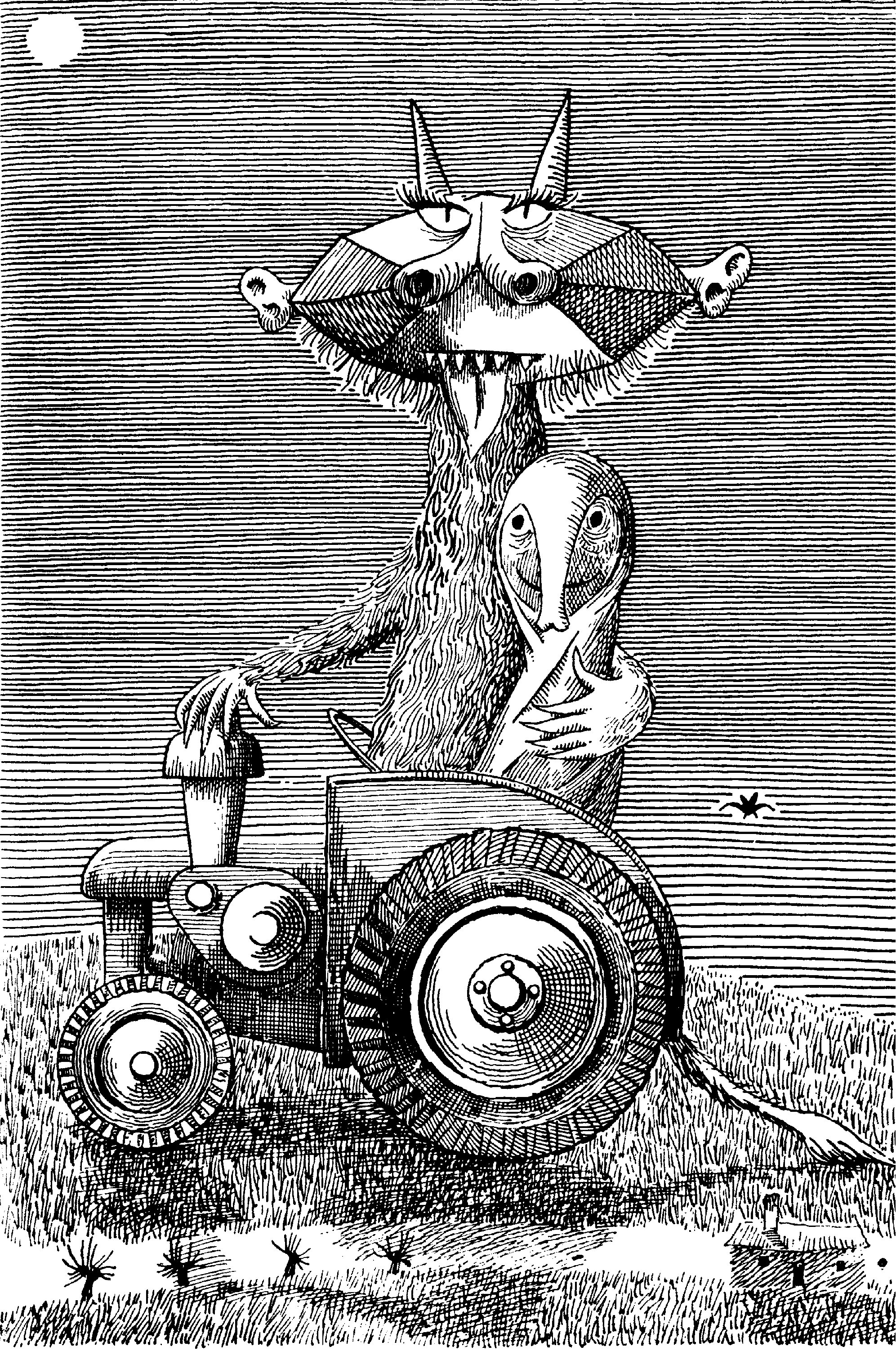
Daniel Mróz illustration for Mrożek's 1957 book Słoń (The Elephant)

Mrożek's first play, The Police, was published in 1958. His first full-length play, Tango (1965) written about totalitarianism in the style of Theatre of the Absurd, made him, according to Krystyna Dąbrowska, one of the most recognizable Polish contemporary dramatists in the world. It became also Mrożek's most successful play, according to Britannica, produced in many Western countries. In 1975 his second popular play Emigranci (The Émigrés), a bitter and ironic portrait of two Polish emigrants in Paris, was produced by director Andrzej Wajda at the Teatr Stary in Kraków.

Mrożek traveled to France, England, Italy, Yugoslavia and other European countries. After the military crackdown of 1981 Mrożek wrote the only play he ever regretted writing, called Alfa, about the imprisoned Solidarity leader Lech Wałęsa who became President of Poland after the collapse of the Soviet empire. See also "fałszywka". After the introduction of martial law in Poland, productions of Alfa were banned, along with two of Mrożek's other plays, The Ambassador and Vatzlav. The later play, in Gdańsk, in the city known as the birth and home to Solidarity (Polish trade union) and its leader Lech Wałęsa, Theater Wybrzeze courageously premiered "Vatzlav". These were the times that the country had food shortages, curfews and a police hour. Many actors were interned including actor Jerzy Kiszkis who played the title role of "Vatzlav". A Gdańsk born actress, activist and Solidarity Solidarność (Solidarity)supporter Beata Pozniak, was asked to play Justine, a character that symbolized justice. Censorship in theaters were enforced. It was noted that in this 1982 Gdańsk production, the censor stopped Mrozek's play not allowing many gestures made by actors on stage, including Justine's father wearing a beard, because he reminded her too much of Karl Marx.

== Works ==
List of plays by Mrożek (below) is based on Małgorzata Sugiera's "Dramaturgia Sławomira Mrożka" (Dramatic works of Sławomir Mrożek):

- Professor / The professor
- Policja / The Police, "Dialog" 1958, nr 6
- Męczeństwo Piotra Oheya / The Martyrdom of Peter Ohey, "Dialog" 1959, nr 6
- Indyk / The Turkey, "Dialog" 1960, nr 10
- Na pełnym morzu / At Sea, "Dialog" 1961, nr 2
- Karol / Charlie, "Dialog" 1961, nr 3
- Strip-tease, "Dialog" 1961, nr 6
- Zabawa / The Party, "Dialog" 1962, nr 10
- Kynolog w rozterce / Dilemmas of a dog breeder, "Dialog" 1962, nr 11
- Czarowna noc / The magical night, "Dialog" 1963, nr 2
- Śmierć porucznika / The death of the lieutenant, "Dialog" 1963, nr 5
- Der Hirsch, trans. Ludwik Zimmerer (in:) STÜCKE I, Berlin (West), 1965 (no Polish version)
- Tango, "Dialog" 1965, nr 11
- Racket baby, trans. Ludwik Zimmerer (in:) STÜCKE I, Berlin (West), 1965 (no Polish version)
- Poczwórka / The quarter, "Dialog" 1967, nr 1
- Dom na granicy / The house on the border, "Dialog" 1967, nr 1
- Testarium, "Dialog" 1967, nr 11
- Drugie danie / The main course, "Dialog" 1968, nr 5
- Szczęśliwe wydarzenie / The fortunate event, "Kultura" 1971, nr 5
- Rzeźnia / The slaughterhouse, "Kultura" 1971, nr 5
- Emigranci / The Émigrés, "Dialog" 1974, nr 8
- Garbus / The Hunchback, "Dialog" 1975, nr 9
- Serenada / The Serenade, "Dialog" 1977, nr 2
- Lis filozof / The philosopher fox, "Dialog" 1977, nr 3
- Polowanie na lisa / Fox hunting, "Dialog" 1977, nr 5
- Krawiec / The Tailor (written in 1964) "Dialog" 1977, nr 11
- Lis aspirant / The trainee fox, "Dialog" 1978, nr 7
- Pieszo / On foot, "Dialog" 1980, nr 8
- Vatzlav (written in 1968), published by the Instytut Literacki (Literary Institute in Paris)
- Ambassador / The Ambassador, Paris 1982
- Letni dzień / A summer day, "Dialog" 1983, nr 6
- Alfa / Alpha, Paryz, 1984
- Kontrakt / The contract, "Dialog" 1986, nr 1
- Portret / The portrait, "Dialog" 1987, nr 9
- Wdowy / Widows (written in 1992)
- Milość na Krymie / Love in the Crimea, "Dialog" 1993, nr 12
- Wielebni / The reverends, "Dialog" 2000, nr 11
- Piękny widok / A beautiful sight, "Dialog" 2000, nr 5

=== English translations ===
- Tango. New York: Grove Press, 1968.
- The Ugupu Bird (selected stories from: Wesele w Atomicach, Deszcz and an excerpt from Ucieczka na południe). London: Macdonald & Co., 1968.
- Striptease, Repeat Performance, and The Prophets. New York: Grove Press, 1972.
- Vatzlav. London: Cape, 1972.
- The Elephant (Słoń). Westport: Greenwood Press, 1972.
