= Quaker Meeting House, Edinburgh =

Coordinates: 55°56′56″N 3°11′37″W

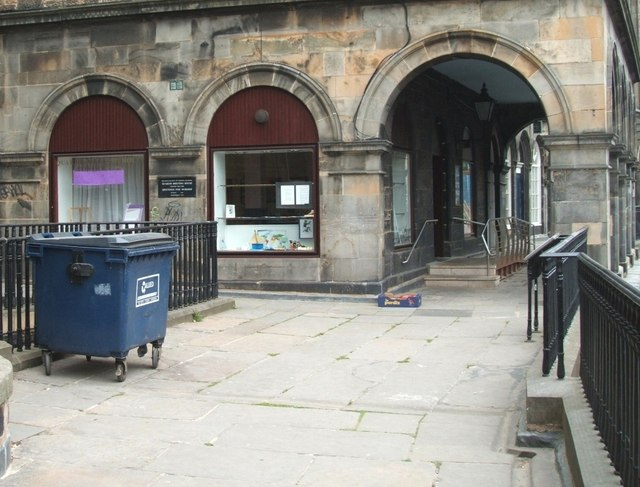
Entrance to the Quaker Meeting House, Edinburgh

The Quaker Meeting House, Edinburgh is a Category B listed building in Edinburgh, Scotland, situated on Victoria Terrace in the city's Old Town. It is the central meeting house for members of the Quakers in Edinburgh. There is also another Quaker meeting held in the Open Door cafe in Morningside in the south of the city.

The three-storey Italian Gothic church was built by architects Paterson and Shiells in 1865–66. It can be accessed from the Lawnmarket or from George IV Bridge, via a terrace that overlooks Victoria Street.

As a religious building, it is managed by the South East Scotland Area Meeting of the Religious Society of Friends (Quakers). It is no longer used as a venue (Venue 40) at the Edinburgh Festival Fringe every August.

There are four event spaces in the building:

- The Meeting Room (second floor, capacity: 60)
- The Hall (first floor, capacity: 80)
- The Library (first floor, capacity: 30)
- The Bow Room (ground floor, capacity: 15)
