= Homeward Bound (play) =

Stage drama by Elliott Hayes

Homeward Bound is a 1991 Canadian play drama by Elliott Hayes. It was originally commissioned and produced by the Stratford Festival.

Novelist Margaret Atwood wrote about the play: "Elliott Hayes has fashioned a brisk, intricate, deranging and tightly strung play...[his] art is a funhouse mirror, and what we see in it are fragments of ourselves, distorted, grotesque even, but recognizable.".

Canadian journalist and theatre artist Richard Ouzounian wrote in 2004 that Homeward Bound "remains one of the greatest plays that anybody has written in this country in my lifetime".

The play has also been translated into French by Jean-Marc Dalpé and Robert Marinier, as Tout va pour le mieux.

== Productions ==
The play has been produced numerous times since its Stratford debut. Notable productions include:

- Theatre Three, Dallas (1992)
- Griffin Theatre Company, Illinois Theatre Center, Chicago (1992)
- Canadian Stage, Toronto (1994)
- Vancouver Playhouse (1995)
- Royal Manitoba Theatre Centre, Winnipeg (1995)
- National Arts Centre, Ottawa (1999)
- Grand Theatre, London, Ontario (1999)
- Neptune Theatre, Halifax (2001)
- Citadel Theatre, Edmonton (2003)
- Gateway Theatre, Vancouver (2005)
- Western Gold Theatre, Vancouver (2017)
