= Vatzlav =

Play by Polish dramatist and writer Slawomir Mrozek

Vatzlav is a play by Polish dramatist and writer Slawomir Mrozek. It was written between 1968 and 1969 and has 77 scenes. It has been widely produced with productions at the Stratford Festival, off Broadway, and the Edinburgh Festival Fringe.

New York Times writer Mel Gussow called it "a three-ring circus of a comedy, cataloguing the injustices - and the sheer craziness - of civilization".

Vatzlav is a comedic farce that turns political at every stage. A family has a grown son who wears diapers and is a bear. Oedipus Rex is an old blind man and the protector of all things right. A Genius has a daughter called Justice, who must be 'revealed' to the world. And there's Vatzlav himself, stuck on the island with them.

One of the most talked about stage performances of Vatzlav was created in Teatr Wybrzeze, Gdańsk (1982) during the times when the play was banned in Poland. Actors were interned, and after their release they wore masks on stage. Censorship was imposed in theaters. A Gdańsk born actress and activist Beata Pozniak played Justine, a character that symbolized justice. These performances had hope and reflected the times people lived in.
