= Michael Langham =

British actor and director

- Born: 22 August 1919; Bridgwater, Somerset, England
- Died: 15 January 2011 (aged 91); Cranbrook, Kent, England
- Occupations: Theatre director; actor
- Spouse: Helen Burns
- Children: Chris Langham

Michael Seymour Langham (22 August 1919 – 15 January 2011) was an English director and actor, who spent much of his career living and working in Canada and the United States.

He was educated at Radley College and studied law at the University of London before enlisting in the British Army in 1939. After spending five years as a prisoner of war, Langham set his sights on the theatre and led several repertory theatres in the UK including Coventry (1946–1948), Birmingham (1948–1950) and Glasgow (1953–1954).

Langham was the second artistic director at the Stratford Festival in Canada from 1956 to 1967, and he directed 38 productions over a 53 year association with Stratford. He was the third artistic director of the Guthrie Theater from 1971 to 1977. He was also director of the Juilliard School from 1979 to 1982, and again from 1987 to 1992. In 1995 he directed two plays for the inaugural season of the Atlantic Theatre Festival in Wolfville, Nova Scotia.

Langham was married to actress Helen Burns. Their son is the writer and comedy actor Chris Langham.

Langham died on 15 January 2011 in Cranbrook, Kent, England, after a short illness.

== Video clips ==
- Interview for TheatreMuseumCanada on YouTube
- Interview with Stratford Festival costumer Cynthia MacLennan on working with Langham.
