= Elliott Hayes =

Canadian playwright

- Born: June 22, 1956; Stratford, Ontario
- Died: February 28, 1994 (aged 37); Fairview, Ontario
- Occupation: Playwright
- Writing career
- Genres: plays, poetry, novels, short stories

Elliott Hayes (June 22, 1956 – February 28, 1994) was a Canadian playwright. In 1994, he was killed in a car accident by a drunk driver.

Elliott Hayes was born in Stratford, Ontario to a theatrical family. He was the grandson of classical actor, George Hayes and the son of John Sullivan Hayes who was one of the original company members of the Stratford Festival.

He graduated from the Old Vic Theatre School in Bristol, and worked in Hollywood for several years before returning to Canada in 1981. He then served for many years as the literary manager, dramaturge and occasional lyricist and assistant director at the Stratford Festival.

His career was brief but produced several important works, including short stories, novels, poems and plays. His most produced work, Homeward Bound, was noted by author Margaret Atwood as "a brisk, intricate, and tightly-strung play with a lot of laughter", and by Canadian journalist Richard Ouzounian as "one of the greatest plays that anybody has written in this country in my lifetime". It was first produced at the Stratford Festival and has since been performed across Canada and the United States. In a Globe and Mail feature on Hayes published just over a month before his death entitled "Bound for success", journalist Val Ross wrote that he "is emerging as one of Canada's most successful playwrights".

The Elliott Hayes Award, which recognizes high achievement in the creation or adaptation of a work for the stage, has been awarded annually by the Literary Managers and Dramaturgs of the Americas since 1999.

== Works ==
- Blake, 1983
- Homeward Bound, 1991
- World of Wonders (adapted from the novel by Robertson Davies), 1992
- Happily Ever After, 1993
- Hard Hearts, 1993
- Life on Mars, 1993
