= 3rd ACTRA Awards =

Canadian television awards ceremony

- Date: March 2, 1974
- Hosted by: Pierre Berton

Television/radio coverage
- Network: CBC Television

The 3rd ACTRA Awards were presented on March 2, 1974, at a ceremony hosted by Pierre Berton.

It marked the first time that the ceremony was broadcast by CBC Television, although that took place as a "highlights" show following the end of the event rather than as a live broadcast. It also marked the first time that ACTRA divided some categories up into separate awards for radio and television content, a process that would continue in future years.

== Winners and nominees ==
Earle Grey Award	Best Radio Actor
Jackie Burroughs, Vicky; Diana Leblanc, Lighten My Darkness; Chuck Shamata, Between Friends; John Vernon, More Joy in Heaven	Denise Pelletier, Colette; Marie Hohtanz, We Don't Need Another Widow McEachern; Sean Mulcahy, Shadow of a Gunman; Billie Mae Richards, Echo of No Return
Best Public Affairs Broadcaster, Television	Best Public Affairs Broadcaster, Radio
Adrienne Clarkson, Take 30; Fred Davis, Screen Gems; Bill Guest, Reach for the Top	Barbara Frum, As It Happens; Harry Brown, As It Happens; Peter Gzowski, This Country in the Morning; Betty Kennedy, China Today
Best Dramatic Writer, Television	Best Documentary Writer, Television
Grahame Woods, Vicky; Warren Graves, What You Always Wanted to Know About the Establishment; Charles Israel, Lighten My Darkness; Marian Waldman, The Trial of Polly Upgate	Harry Rasky, Tennessee Williams' South; Munroe Scott, The Days Before Yesterday: "King of Canada"; Chuck Weir, Fiddles of Shelburne; George Woodcock, In the South Seas: "Island of Solomon"
Best Dramatic Writer, Radio	Best Documentary Writer, Radio
Munroe Scott, The Devil's Petition; Helen French, Games; Paul Kligman, It All Ends Up in a Shopping Bag; James W. Nichol, Feast of the Dead	Rod Coneybeare, The Entertainers: "Frank Sinatra"; Warren Wilson, Jon Vickers: A Life in Music; David Windsor, Death of an Empress
Best Variety Performer	Best Sportscaster
Diane Stapley, Inside Canada; Juliette, Juliette and Friends; Wayne and Shuster, My Fair Partner	Danny Gallivan; Don Chevrier; Pat Marsden
Gordon Sinclair Award	John Drainie Award
Howie Meeker; Gordon Atkinson; Bruce Marsh; Charles Templeton	Len Peterson
