= Give Sorrow Words =

1979 book by Maryse Holder

- Cover of the 1979 Grove Press first edition.
- Author: Maryse Holder
- Language: English
- Subject: Feminism
- Genre: Memoir
- Publisher: Grove Press
- Publication date: 1979
- Publication place: United States
- Media type: Print (Hardcover)
- Pages: 302
- ISBN: 0-394-50621-9

Give Sorrow Words: Maryse Holder's Letters from Mexico is a memoir of feminism and sexual adventurism in Mexico by American author Maryse Holder. The book was published posthumously in 1979 by Grove Press, after Holder was murdered in Mexico in 1977, at age 36.

== History ==
After being dismissed as a Professor at City University in a mass firing due to NYC fiscal problems, Holder decided to pursue a life exploring sex in Mexico. During the course of two long trips to Mexico from 1975 to 1977, she wrote a series of letter to Edith Jones, a friend in New York City. In these letters she describes her experiences, including her many sexual adventures, in what she called her "vacation from feminism." Holder's writing, which she describes as an attempt to "...wring a masterpiece from my life." has been compared to Jean Genet, Jean Rhys and Henry Miller in its candor, artistry and intelligence. In addition to the letters, the published book has an introduction by feminist author Kate Millett, and concludes with an epilogue describing Holder's life and death by Selma Yampolsky, a close friend of Holder's.

== Publication history ==
Give Sorrow Words was first published in a hardbound edition in 1979 by Grove Press. A paperback edition was published in 1980 by Avon Books. A German hardbound edition was published under the title Ich Atme Mit Dem Herzen in 1981 by Büchergilde Gutenberg. The SoHo Weekly News ran excerpts from the book ran as a three-part series in March/April 1979.

== Critical response ==
The New York Times Review of Books praised the book, calling it “...a compelling document... the letters are her legacy, her testament, her vindication.”. The LA Times described it as "...intellectual erotica... In Holder's progressively self-destructive odyssey there emerges a classic confrontation between North American feminism and Mexican machismo." It has also been described by writer Lynne Segal as a "...harrowing tale of one woman's neurotic self-destruction."

== Film adaptation ==
In 1987, A Winter Tan, a Canadian film, was adapted from the Give Sorrow Words. It was shown at the Toronto and New York Film Festivals in 1988. Jackie Burroughs won a Genie award for her portrayal of Maryse Holder in the film.
