= The Loony-Bin Trip =

1990 book by Kate Millett

- Cover of the first edition
- Author: Kate Millett
- Language: English
- Publisher: Simon & Schuster
- Publication date: 1990
- Publication place: United States
- Media type: Print
- Pages: 316
- ISBN: 0-671-67930-9

The Loony-Bin Trip is the seventh book by American feminist and anti-psychiatry writer and activist Kate Millett. It was published in 1990 by Simon & Schuster. In a review for Hypatia, Thomas Steinbuch described the book as "an extraordinary account of [Millett's] personal experience with involuntary psychiatric commitment." It was nominated for the 3rd Lambda Literary Awards in the Lesbian Non-Fiction category.

== Synopsis ==
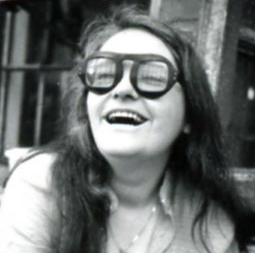
Millett in 1970

Millett's memoir, The Loony-Bin Trip, begins at her sustainable farm in Poughkeepsie, New York. She decides to stop taking lithium which she was using for seven years after being involuntarily committed twice by her family. One reason she wants to stop taking lithium is its side effects. Millett experiences hand trembling and brain fog. As a painter and a writer, she knows these symptoms have tremendous effects. She uses descriptive details regarding her romantic relationship with Sophie Keir. Recently, the couple has been having increasingly spiteful arguments. Attempting to mend the relationship, Millett announces that she has stopped taking the drug. Millet's family and Keir tell her that she is acting foolishly. The book deals with the aftermath of this decision.

In the next part of the book, there are flashbacks to the times she was committed. Millett offers her experience with psychiatry and mental institutions. At the age of 18, she held a summer job at St. Peter's Asylum; Millett now recalls how terribly the patients were treated. Her family does not believe her stories from the asylum which becomes a common theme throughout the book. As a free, independent, published writer, she never would have thought she could be committed involuntarily to a mental hospital. Her first "bust" as she refers to it in the memoir lasted 10 days before she agreed to sign a voluntary patient form. Her mother, sister, and husband, Fumio Yoshimura, admitted her without consent. During that same year, her mother admitted her to a mental facility in St. Paul which lasted two weeks. A lawyer named Donald Heffernan freed her by winning a sanity trial. It was with that lawyer that Millett changed Minnesota laws regarding involuntary commitment without a trial. Millett became increasingly depressed after her second release, especially when those around her believed she was "crazy".

About seven years later, her younger sister, Mallory, tried to admit her as she was worried about Kate's decision to stop taking lithium. With Dr. Pulp accompanying her, Mallory ambushed Kate asking her to consider admitting herself to a mental institution. Dr. Pulp, not caring if Kate consented, had two ambulances ready outside Kate's apartment. When hearing the sirens waiting for her, Kate had to fight against her instinct to cry and scream. With the help of New York State laws and a kind-hearted police officer, Kate is not forced into the loony bin. Millett had plans to fly to Ireland to speak to the Irish Labour Party. When leaving Ireland, she was intercepted at the Shannon Airport under suspicion. According to Millet, airport security found her suspicious and ran a background check on her. She is arrested and committed to an asylum that she calls, "the worst bin of all". At first, she dreamily pictured her escape. Quickly, she was pushed into a true escape attempt, but she was caught by guards. A friend, actress Margaretta D'Arcy, and members of the women's movement rescued Millett by transferring her to a better facility where the chances of release were higher. In the acknowledgments, she thanks her saviors: Margaretta D'Arcy, Deirdre McCarten, Sylvia Meehan, Nell McCafferty, Maere Rountree, and Dr. Ivor Browne.

While she was committed, a psychiatrist diagnosed her with manic depression, now understood as bipolar disorder. Throughout her personal account, Millett is adamant that she does not have manic depression. She argues that all her mental health issues were a result of being institutionalized. However, after she stops taking lithium, she is worried about expressing anger and madness and proving her family right. She wonders if her partner, Sophie, will perceive her actions as manic all because she stopped taking her medication. The following excerpt from the memoir perfectly encapsulates her thoughts on psychiatric hospitalization:

That is the purpose of this place; it was made for you to be mad in. ... The crime of the imaginary. The lure of madness as illness. And you crumble day by day and admit your guilt. Induced madness. Refuse a pill and you will be tied down and given a hypodermic by force. Enforced irrationality. With all the force of the state behind it, pharmaceutical corporations, and an entrenched bureaucratic psychiatry. Unassailable social beliefs, general throughout the culture. And all the scientific prestige of medicine. Locks, bars, buildings, cops. A massive system.

In the last two chapters of the memoir, Yoshimura, her husband of twenty years, divorces her to start a new life elsewhere. Despite the fact that their relationship was a marriage of convenience for immigration purposes, and they had been living separately for years, Millet selfishly wanted to maintain their friendly connection. Millett was still "sick with depression" and did not wish for him to see her so broken. She knew he would delay the divorce and his move if he knew she was hurt. A chapter's conclusion shows that Millett's life is changing when she writes, "... I am getting better." In the final chapter, Millett is visited by a former lover, Rae, who was institutionalized for many years. Rae appeared so devastated that Millett decided the next morning to write The Looney-Bin Trip.
