= Yoshimura =

Yoshimura (written: 吉村) is a Japanese surname. Notable people with the surname include:

- Akira Yoshimura (吉村 昭), Japanese novelist
- Fumio Yoshimura (吉村 二三夫; 1926–2002), Japanese sculptor
- Gotaro Yoshimura (吉村 剛太郎), Japanese politician
- Haruka Yoshimura (佳村 はるか), Japanese voice actress
- Hirofumi Yoshimura (吉村 洋文), Japanese politician
- Hiroshi Yoshimura (佳村 はるか), Japanese musician and composer
- Junzō Yoshimura (吉村 順三), Japanese architect
- Kazuhiro Yoshimura (吉村 和弘; born 1996), Japanese table tennis player
- Keiji Yoshimura (吉村 圭司), Japanese footballer
- Koji Yoshimura (吉村 光示), Japanese footballer
- Kōzaburō Yoshimura (吉村 公三郎), Japanese film director
- Naomi Yoshimura (吉村 直巳; born 1995), Japanese professional wrestler
- Pops Yoshimura (吉村 秀雄, Yoshimura Hideo), Japanese motorcycle tuner and race team owner
- Reimi Yoshimura (吉村 玲美; born 2000), Japanese long-distance runner
- Sakuji Yoshimura (吉村 作治), Japanese archaeologist
- Shiho Yoshimura (吉村志穂; born 1989), Japanese volleyball player
- Yō Yoshimura (吉村よう; 1954–1991), Japanese voice actor
- Yumi Yoshimura (吉村 由美), Japanese singer
