= Kay Hawtrey =

Canadian actress (1926–2021)

- Born: Katharine Mary Craven Hawtrey; November 8, 1926; Toronto, Ontario, Canada
- Died: June 11, 2021 (aged 94); Toronto, Ontario, Canada
- Education: University of Trinity College
- Occupation: Actress
- Years active: 1971–2020
- Spouse: John Clark (m. 1956; div. 1967)
- Children: 1

Katharine Mary Craven Clark (née Hawtrey, November 8, 1926 – June 11, 2021) was a Canadian actress.

Hawtrey was born on November 8, 1926 and educated at Toronto's Trinity College. She began her career at Hart House Theatre and then went to England for a year's engagement with the Embassy Theatre in London. On her return, Hawtrey appeared in television plays for the CBC, before marrying English actor John Clark in 1956. They moved to New York City in 1959, where they had a son in 1963, naming him Jonathan Hawtrey Clark. They divorced in 1967 and she returned to Toronto with their son, appearing in many film and television productions. She is best remembered for her appearance in the 1980 film Funeral Home.

On Broadway, Hawtrey appeared in Love and Libel (1960).

Hawtrey died in Toronto on June 11, 2021, at the age of 94.

== Partial filmography ==
Year	Title	Role	Notes
1971	Face-Off	Mother	
1978	High-Ballin'	Ma	
1979	Fish Hawk	Mary Bryan	
1979	Summer's Children	Mrs. Baines	
1980	Funeral Home	Maude Chalmers	
1980	Hank Williams: The Show He Never Gave	Gospel Woman	
1981	The Intruder	Crossing Guard	
1981	Silence of the North	Mrs. Miller	
1983	Videodrome	Matron	
1984	Police Academy	Surprise Party Lady (uncredited)	
1984	Mrs. Soffel	Peter's Secretary (uncredited)	
1986	Confidential	Doris	
1987	Police Academy 4: Citizens on Patrol	Poetess	
1987	Love at Stake	Mrs. Johnson	
1987	Goofballs	Miss Meyers	
1989	The Dream Team	Nurse	
1989	The Raccoons	Miss Primrose	
1992	Baby on Board	Matron #1	
1994	Trial by Jury	Clara, Juror	
1994	Trapped in Paradise	Rose Weyerhauser	
1995	At the Midnight Hour	Mrs Pram	
1995–2001	Little Bear	Granny	
1996	Two If by Sea	Lady With Dog	
1996	Kids in the Hall: Brain Candy	Wally's Neighbor	
1996	In Love and War	Grace Hall Hemingway	
1997	Critical Care	Dr. Butz's Secretary	
1997	The Secret Life of Algernon	Mrs. Binney	
1998	Dirty Work	Gladys	
1998	Urban Legend	Library Attendant	
1999	The Third Miracle	Wheelchair Mother	
2001	Dead by Monday	Hospital Cafeteria Lady	
2001	Focus	Mrs. Newman	
2002	Perfect Pie	English Teacher	
2002–20	Max & Ruby	Grandma Bunny	
2006	.45	Marge	

== See also ==
- List of show business families
