= Jackie Burroughs =

Canadian actress (1939–2010)

- Born: Jacqueline West Burroughs; 2 February 1939; Southport, Lancashire, England
- Died: 22 September 2010 (aged 71); Toronto, Ontario, Canada
- Occupation: Actress
- Years active: 1966–2010
- Spouse: Zal Yanovsky (m. 1967; div. 1968)
- Children: 1

Jacqueline Burroughs (2 February 1939 – 22 September 2010) was a Canadian actress. Burroughs starred in over 100 films and television shows over her career, including Heavy Metal, The Care Bears Movie, The Grey Fox, and Anne of Green Gables, and was best known for her role as Hetty King in the TV series Road to Avonlea.

== Early life ==
Born in Southport, Lancashire (now Merseyside), England, on 2 February 1939, Burroughs emigrated to Canada with her family in 1951. She attended the University of Toronto, graduating in 1962. At university, Burroughs appeared in Trinity College productions of Saint Joan, The Cave Dwellers and Resounding Tinkle.

== Career ==
After graduating, Burroughs travelled to England and was a member of the Chesterfield Civic Repertory Theatre for a season, before returning to Toronto. Burroughs appeared with Crest summer-time spinoff Straw Hat Players, before her debut at Toronto's Crest Theatre in 1963 in the play Arms and the Man. In 1967, she married Zal Yanovsky and moved to New York City. After they divorced in 1968, Burroughs returned to Canada and live theatre, performing at Ottawa's National Arts Centre, Ontario's Stratford Festival and Shaw Festival, including starring as Portia in The Merchant of Venice in 1976. Burroughs won the 1969 Canadian Film Award for best actress, for starring in the television film Dulcima. Burroughs acted in over 100 films and television programs, including a voice-over stint in the animated anthology Heavy Metal (1981), appearances in The Grey Fox (1982), and The Dead Zone (1983). Burroughs played the voice of The Evil Spirit in 1985's The Care Bears Movie.

In 1987, Burroughs produced, directed, co-wrote, and starred in A Winter Tan, a film based on the letters of Maryse Holder, published in 1979 as the book Give Sorrow Words – Maryse Holder's Letters from Mexico, later receiving a Genie Award for best performance by an actress in a leading role for the film. She played role of Mrs. Amelia Evans in Anne of Green Gables (1985). She was perhaps best known for her portrayal of the fictional character, Hetty King, in the CBC Television series Road to Avonlea from 1990 to 1996. The series was based on the works of Canadian author Lucy Maud Montgomery. She also played Mother Mucca in the television adaptations of Armistead Maupin's More Tales of the City and Further Tales of the City. Burroughs again played a mother role in 2003's Willard.

In 2001, she was awarded the Earle Grey Award for her contributions to arts and entertainment over the years by the Academy of Canadian Cinema and Television. In 2005, Burroughs received a Governor General's Performing Arts Award for Lifetime Artistic Achievement, Canada's highest honour in the performing arts. Over her career, Burroughs was nominated ten times and won seven, including four Gemini Awards and two Canadian Film Awards. Burroughs also won three Genie Awards.

== Personal life ==
Burroughs was married to Zalman Yanovsky, co-founder (with John Sebastian) of The Lovin' Spoonful; they separated in 1968. They had one daughter.

== Death ==
Burroughs died at her home in Toronto on 22 September 2010, aged 71, after suffering from stomach cancer.

== Filmography ==
=== Film ===
Year	Title	Role	Notes
1966	Notes for a Film About Donna and Gail	Gail	
1967	The Ernie Game	Gail	
1971	Eat Anything		
1972	A Fan's Notes	Betty Blind	
1974	Monkeys in the Attic	Wanda	
1974	125 Rooms of Comfort	Bobbie Kidd	
1975	My Pleasure Is My Business	Old lady at pool	Uncredited
1980	The Kidnapping of the President	Woman Agent	
1981	Heavy Metal	Katherine	Voice, (segment "Den")
1981	The Intruder	Eleanor	
1982	The Grey Fox	Katherine 'Kate' Flynn	
1983	The Wars	Miss Davenport	
1983	The Dead Zone	Vera Smith	
1983	Gentle Sinners	Mrs. Smith	
1984	Chautauqua Girl	Mrs. Ferguson	
1984	The Surrogate	Woman at Anouk's	
1985	The Care Bears Movie	The Evil Spirit	Voice
1986	A Judgment in Stone	Joan Smith	
1987	A Winter Tan	Maryse Holder	
1987	John and the Missus	Missus	
1988	Inside/Out		
1989	Food of the Gods II	Dr. Treger	
1989	The Midday Sun	Lilian	
1990	Whispers	Mrs. Yancey	
1991	Elizabeth Smart: On the Side of the Angels	Elizabeth Smart	
1992	Careful	Frau Teacher	
1997	Bleeders	Lexie	
1998	Last Night	The Runner	
1999	Have Mercy	Lulu	
2000	Washed Up	Tosca	
2000	How Dinosaurs Learned to Fly	Narrator	Voice, Short
2001	Lost and Delirious	Fay Vaughn	
2001	On Their Knees	Flora	
2002	Night's Noontime	Queen Victoria	Short
2003	A Guy Thing	Aunt Budge	
2003	Willard	Henrietta Stiles	
2003	Rhinoceros Eyes	Mrs. Walnut	
2003	The Republic of Love	Betty Avery	
2004	Cavedweller	Grandma Windsor	
2004	Going the Distance	Mother Libby	
2004	Re-Generation	Grandmother	
2005	Fever Pitch	Mrs. Warren	
2005	King's Ransom	Grandma	
2005	Bailey's Billion$	Constance Pennington	
2005	Leo	Felicity	Short
2005	Heidi	Frau Rottenmeier	Voice
2006	The Sentinel	Mrs. Miller	Uncredited
2006	First Snow	Maggie	
2006	Deck the Halls	Mrs. Ryor	
2008	Into the Labyrinth	Ariadne	
2010	Higglety Pigglety Pop!	Mother Goose	Voice, Video short
2010	Small Town Murder Songs	Olive	posthumously released in 2011

=== Television ===
Year	Title	Role	Notes
1969	Dulcima	Dulcima Gaston	Canadian Film Award winner for Best Actress (Non-Feature), 21st Canadian Film Awards
1970	The Psychiatrist	Jane	Episode: "God Bless the Children"
1970	Twelve and a Half Cents	Vicky	
1973	Vicky	Vicky	Earle Grey Award winner, 3rd ACTRA Awards; Canadian Film Award winner for Best Actress (Non-Feature), 25th Canadian Film Awards
1978	Great Performances	Maria Mitchell	Episode: "Out of Our Father's House"
1981	Chairman of the Board	Prof. Hannah Cohen	TV series
1985	Evergreen	Dorothy	TV miniseries
1985	American Playhouse	Emmaline Ozmondo Fingal	Episode: "Overdrawn at the Memory Bank"
1985	Seduced	Mrs. Riordan	TV film
1985	The Undergrads	Nancy Galik	TV film
1985	Star Wars: Ewoks	Morag	Voice, 13 episodes
1985	Anne of Green Gables	Mrs. Amelia Evans	TV miniseries
1987	Taking Care of Terrific	Mrs. Forbes	TV film
1989	The Twilight Zone	Jean Reed	Episode: "Many, Many Monkeys"
1990–1996	Road to Avonlea	Hetty King	Main role
1992	Heritage Minutes	Narrator	Episode: "Rural Teacher"
1993	Night Owl	Dr. Matthews	TV film
1994	The Adventures of Dudley the Dragon	Aggie	Recurring role
1995	Lonesome Dove: The Outlaw Years	Ozza Starks	Episode: "The Hanging"
1997	Elvis Meets Nixon	Dodger	TV film
1997	Due South	Gladys Caunce	Episode: "Eclipse"
1997	Platinum	Sir Ian Ball-Worthington	TV film
1998	Evidence of Blood	Granny Dollar	TV film
1998	More Tales of the City	Mother Mucca	TV miniseries
1998	Happy Christmas, Miss King	Hetty King	TV film
1999	Cover Me	Caitlin Crawford	TV miniseries
2001	Further Tales of the City	Mother Mucca	TV miniseries
2001	Smallville	Cassandra Carver	Episode: "Hourglass"
2003	Just Cause	Lily Zimmer	Episode: "Death's Details"
2003	Made in Canada	Helga Lemper	"Beaver Creek Valentine"
2003	Dead Like Me	Florence	Episode: "Reaping Havoc"
2004	The Eleventh Hour	Arlene Garwood	Episode: "Georgia"
2004	The Winning Season	Mrs. Young	TV film
2004	Snow	Lorna	TV film
2005	Slings & Arrows	Moira	3 episodes
2005	Martha: Behind Bars	Big Martha	TV film
2008	Skip Tracer	Florence	TV film
2009	Sophie	Aunt Sheil	Episode: "Stolen Kisses"
