= The Politics of Cruelty =

The Politics of Cruelty may refer to:

- The Politics of Cruelty (album), a 2007 punk album by Gay for Johnny Depp
- The Politics of Cruelty: An Essay on the Literature of Political Imprisonment, a 1994 book by Kate Millett
