= Going to Iran =

1982 book by Kate Millett

- Cover of the first edition
- Author: Kate Millett
- Language: English
- Publisher: Coward, McCann & Geoghegan
- Publication date: 1982
- Publication place: United States
- Media type: Print
- Pages: 334
- ISBN: 0-698-11095-1

Going to Iran is the sixth book by American feminist writer and activist Kate Millett. It was published in 1982 by Coward, McCann & Geoghegan. It documents the experience of Millett and her partner Sophie Keir when they traveled to Iran's first International Women's Day in 1979.

== Plot ==
Going to Iran follows the personal account of Millett and Sophie Keir's stay in the country during the early days of revolution. Millett was invited to Iran along with several prominent American feminists of the time to speak at a rally in Tehran in celebration of International Women's Day, 1979, less than two months after the Shah's departure. The rally transitioned to a large-scale demonstration, following Ayatollah Khomeini's announcement that women in government offices be required to wear Islamic dress.

== See also ==
- 1979 International Women's Day protests in Tehran
- Feminism in Iran
