= Kate Millett =

American writer and artist (1934–2017)

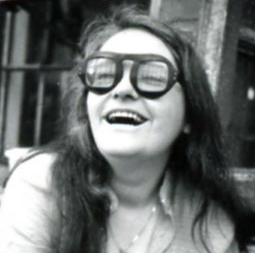
- Photograph by Linda Wolf, 1970
- Born: Katherine Murray Millett; September 14, 1934; Saint Paul, Minnesota, U.S.
- Died: September 6, 2017 (aged 82); Paris, France
- Education: University of Minnesota (BA); St Hilda's College, Oxford (MA); Columbia University (PhD)
- Occupations: Writer; educator; artist; activist
- Spouses: Fumio Yoshimura (m. 1965; div. 1985): Sophie Keir
- Writing career
- Notable work: Sexual Politics (1970)

Katherine Murray Millett (September 14, 1934 – September 6, 2017) was an American feminist writer, educator, artist, and activist. She attended the University of Oxford, and was the first American woman to be awarded a degree with first-class honors, after studying at St Hilda's College, Oxford. She has been described as "a seminal influence on second-wave feminism", and is best known for her book, Sexual Politics (1970), which was based on her doctoral dissertation at Columbia University. Journalist Liza Featherstone attributes the attainment of previously unimaginable "legal abortion, greater professional equality between the sexes, and a sexual freedom" in part to Millett's efforts.

The feminist, human rights, peace, civil rights, and anti-psychiatry movements were some of Millett's principal causes. Her books were motivated by her activism, such as woman's rights and mental health reform, and several were autobiographical memoirs that explored her sexuality, mental health, and relationships. In the 1960s and 1970s, Millett taught at Waseda University, Bryn Mawr College, Barnard College, and the University of California, Berkeley. Some of her later written works are The Politics of Cruelty (1994), about state-sanctioned torture in many countries, and Mother Millett (2001), a book about her relationship with her mother. Between 2011 and 2013, she won the Lambda Pioneer Award for Literature, received Yoko Ono's Courage Award for the Arts, and was inducted into the National Women's Hall of Fame.

Millett was born and raised in Minnesota, and then spent most of her adult life in Manhattan and the Woman's Art Colony, established in Poughkeepsie, New York, which became the Millett Center for the Arts in 2012. Millett came out as a lesbian in 1970, the year the book Sexual Politics was published. However, late in the year 1970 she came out as bisexual. She was married to sculptor Fumio Yoshimura (1965 to 1985), and later, until her death in 2017, she was married to Sophie Keir.

== Early life and education ==
Katherine Murray Millett was born on September 14, 1934, to James Albert and Helen (née Feely) Millett in Saint Paul, Minnesota. According to Millett, she was afraid of her father, an engineer, who beat her. He was an alcoholic who abandoned the family when she was 14, "consigning them to a life of genteel poverty". Her mother was a teacher and insurance saleswoman. She had two sisters, Sally and Mallory; (Note: For Mallory's impression of her sister, see Millett, Mallory (August 29, 2020). "My Sister Kate: The Destructive Feminist Legacy of Kate Millett". MalloryMillett.com.) the latter was one of the subjects of Three Lives. Of Irish Catholic heritage, Kate Millett attended parochial schools in Saint Paul throughout her childhood.

Millett graduated in 1956 magna cum laude from the University of Minnesota with a Bachelor of Arts degree in English literature; she was a member of the Kappa Alpha Theta sorority. A wealthy aunt paid for her education at St Hilda's College, Oxford, (Note: Her aunt paid for her education at Oxford, which was considered "a gesture that had less to do with her aunt's respect for Kate's intellectual gifts than with the family's discovering that she was in love with another woman" and/or due to her aunt's annoyance with Millett's "tendency to defy convention".) gaining an English literature first-class honors degree in 1958. She was the first American woman to be awarded a degree with first-class honors having studied at St. Hilda's. After spending about 10 years as an educator and artist, Millett entered the graduate school program for English and comparative literature at Columbia University in 1968, during which she taught English at Barnard. While there, she championed student rights, women's liberation, and abortion reform. She completed her dissertation in September 1969 and was awarded her doctorate, with distinction, in March 1970.

== Career ==
=== Early career as an artist and educator ===
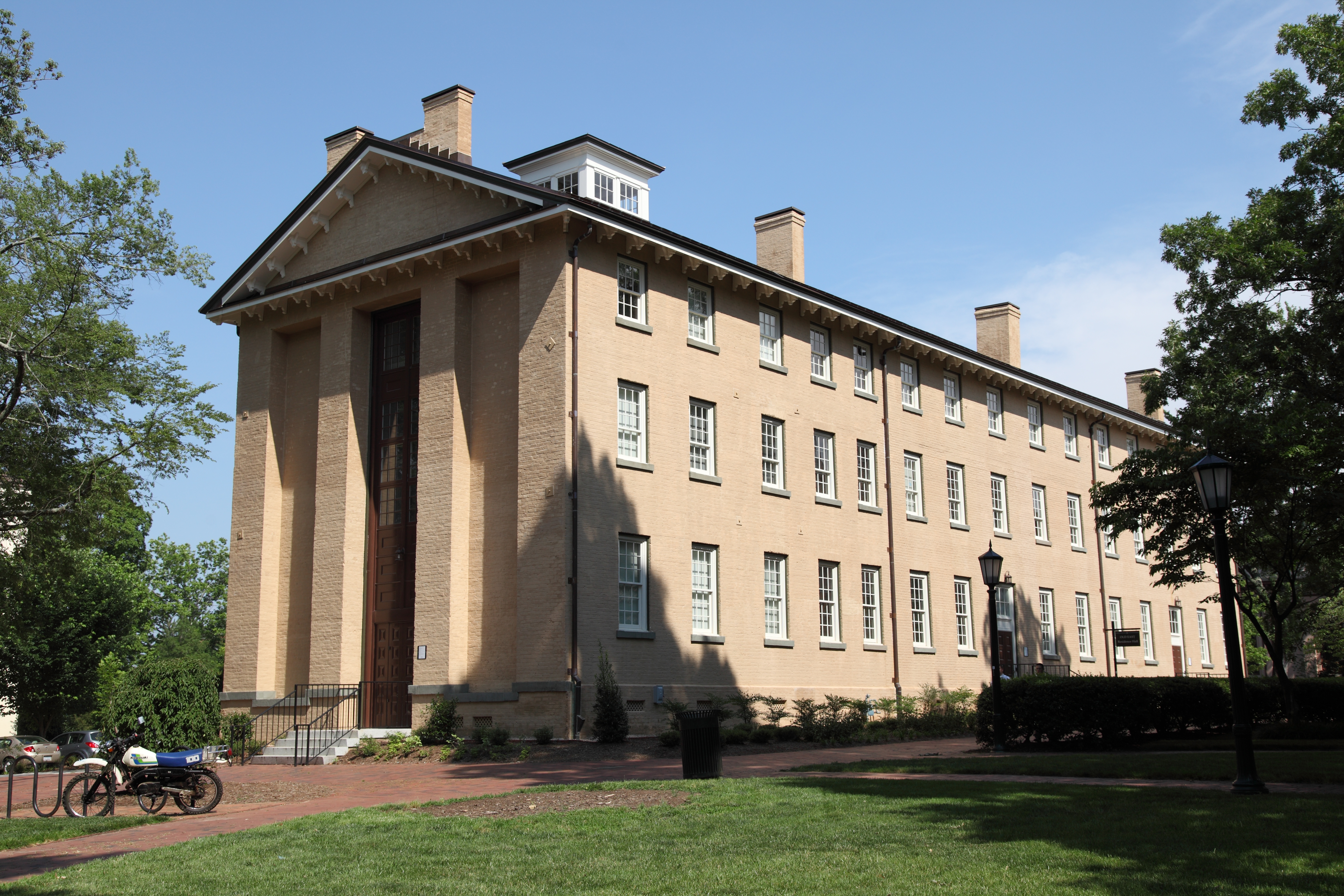
University of North Carolina building

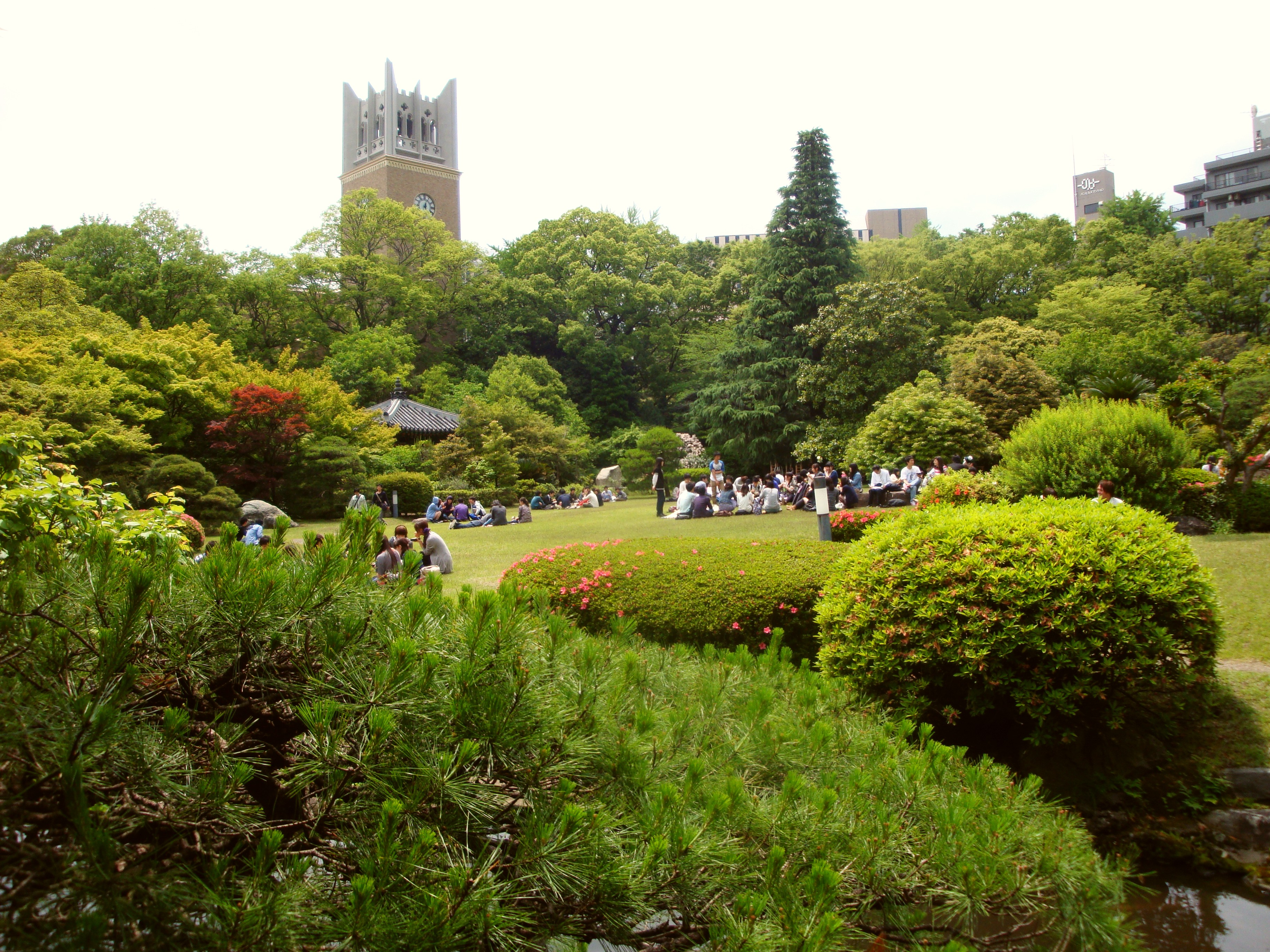
Ōkuma Garden, Waseda University

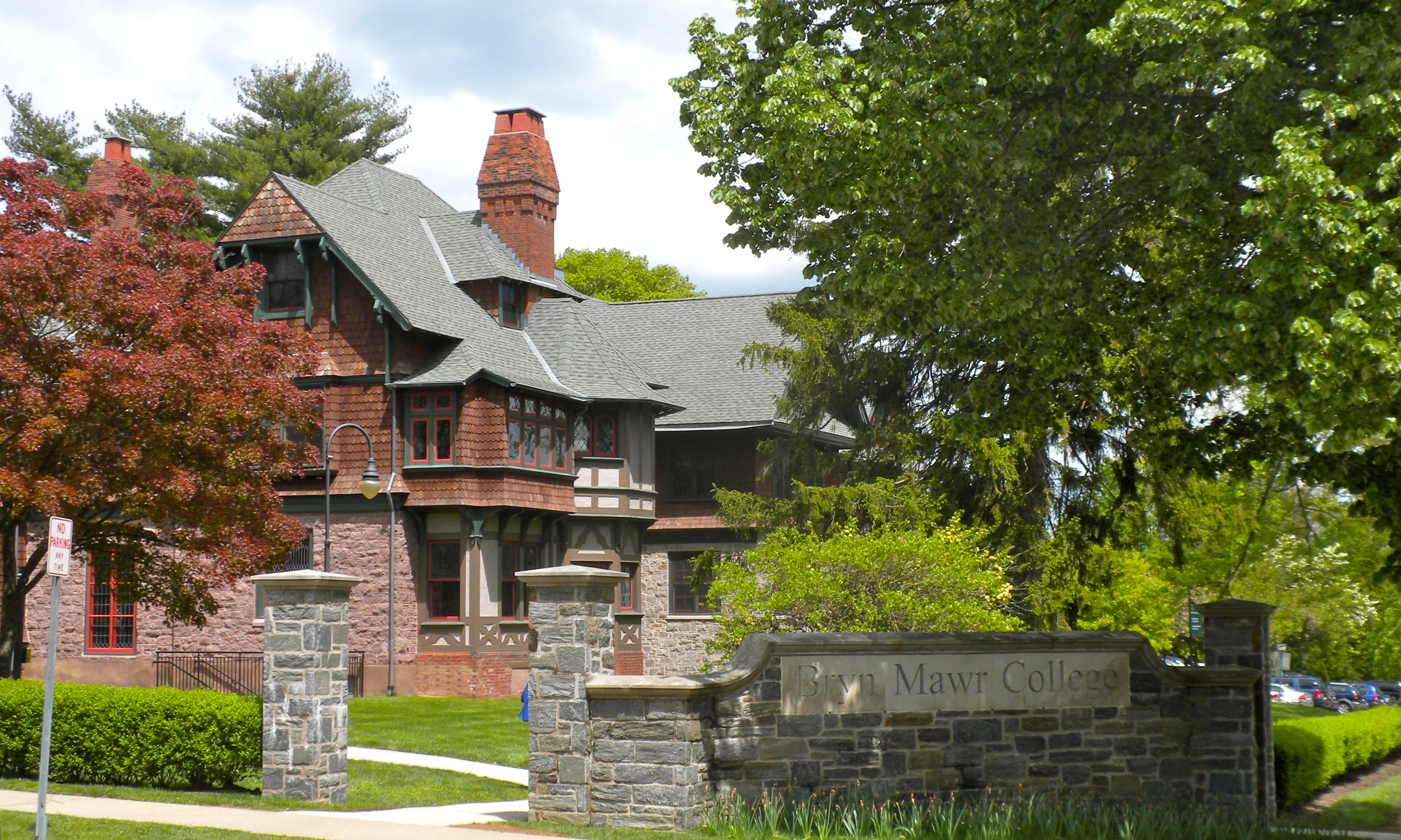
Bryn Mawr College, campus entrance

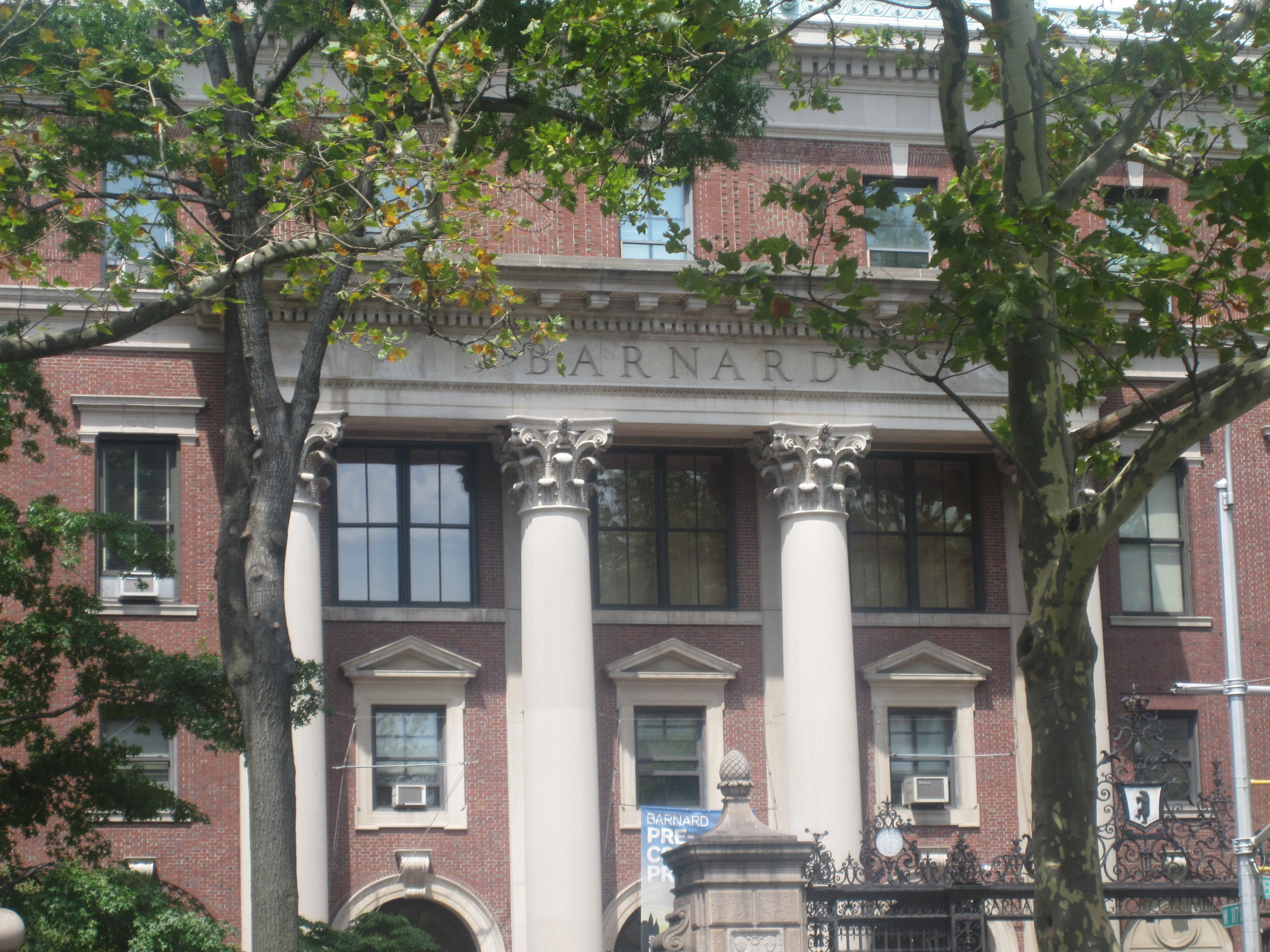
Barnard College

Millett taught English at the University of North Carolina after graduating from Oxford University, but she left mid-semester to study art.

In New York City she worked as a kindergarten teacher and learned to sculpt and paint from 1959 to 1961. She then moved to Japan and studied sculpture. Millett met fellow sculptor Fumio Yoshimura, had her first one-woman show at Tokyo's Minami Gallery, and taught English at Waseda University. She left Japan in 1963 and moved to New York's Lower East Side.

Millett taught English and exhibited her works of art at Barnard College beginning in 1964. She was among a group of young, radical, and untenured educators who wanted to modernize women's education; Millett wanted to provide them with "the critical tools necessary to understand their position in a patriarchal society." Her viewpoints on radical politics, her "stinging attack" against Barnard in Token Learning, and a budget cut at the college led to her being dismissed on December 23, 1968. Her artwork was featured in an exhibit at Greenwich Village's Judson Gallery. During these years Millett became interested in the peace and Civil Rights Movement, joined the Congress of Racial Equality (CORE), and participated in their protests.

In 1971, Millett taught sociology at Bryn Mawr College. She started buying and restoring property that year, near Poughkeepsie, New York; this became the Women's Art Colony and Tree Farm, a community of women artists and writers and Christmas tree farm. Two years later she was an educator at the University of California, Berkeley.

=== The 1980s through 2000s ===
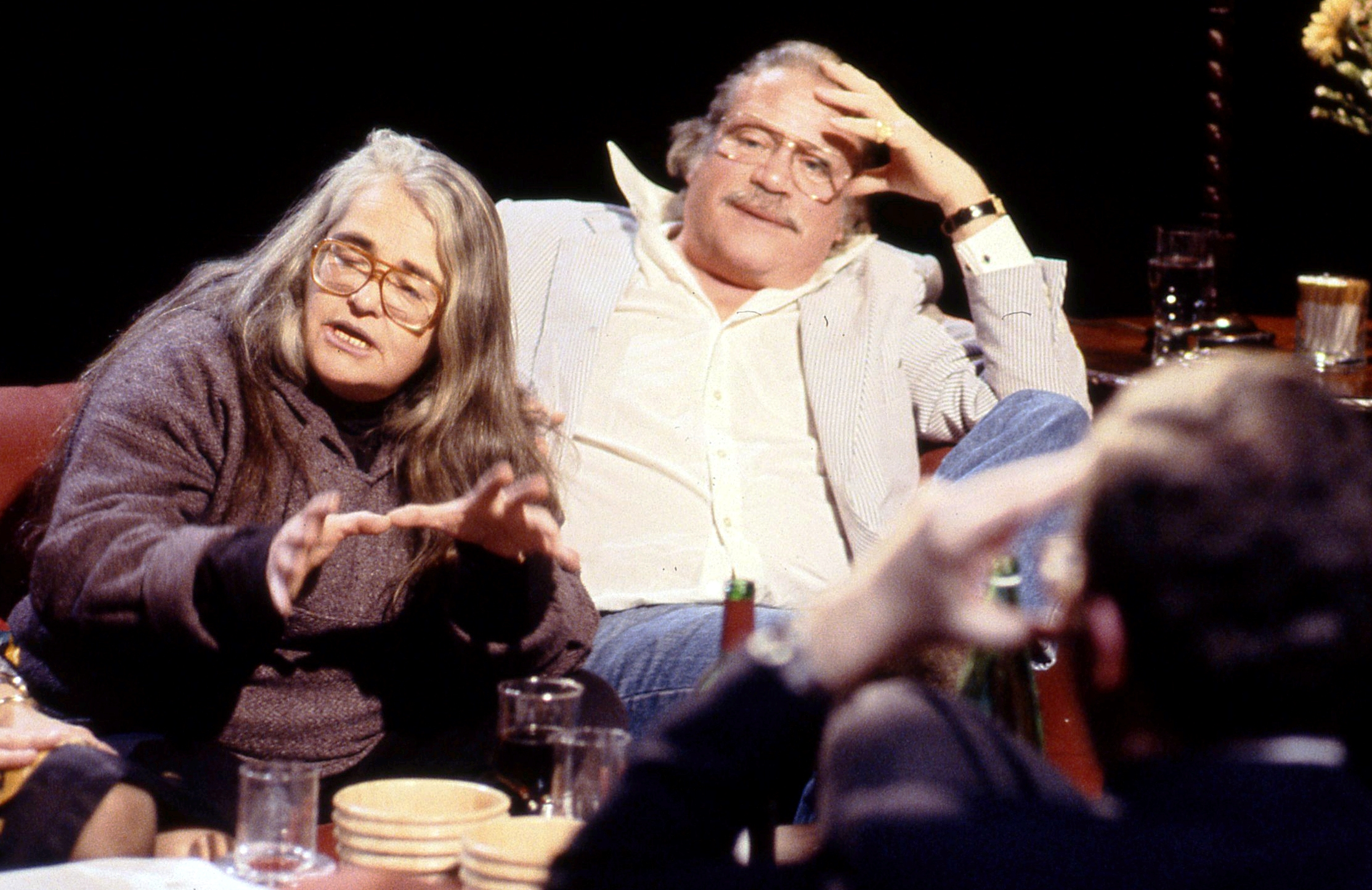
Appearing on UK discussion programme After Dark with Oliver Reed in 1991

In 1980, Millett was one of the ten invited artists whose work was exhibited in the Great American Lesbian Art Show at the Woman's Building in Los Angeles, although Millett identified as bisexual. Millett was also a contributor to On the Issues magazine, and continued writing into the early 2000s. She discussed state-sanctioned torture in The Politics of Cruelty (1994), bringing attention to the use of torture in many countries.

Millett was involved in the controversy resulting from her appearance on a UK television programme called After Dark. Actor Oliver Reed, who had been drinking during the programme, moved in on her and tried to kiss her. Millett pushed him away but reportedly later asked for a tape of the show to entertain her friends. Throughout the programme Reed was being especially obnoxious.

Millett was also involved in prison reform and campaigns against torture. Journalist Maureen Freely wrote of Millett's viewpoint regarding activism in her later years: "The best thing about being a freewheeler is that she can say what she pleases because 'nobody's giving me a chair in anything. I'm too old, mean and ornery. Everything depends on how well you argue.'" In 2012, The Women's Art Colony became a 501(c)3 non-profit organization and changed its name to the Millett Center for the Arts.

== Activism ==
=== Feminism ===
Millett was a leading figure in the women's movement, or second-wave feminism, of the 1960s and 1970s. For example, she and Sidney Abbott, Phyllis Birkby, Alma Routsong, and Artemis March were among the members of CR One, the first lesbian-feminist consciousness-raising group, although Millett identified as bisexual by late 1970.

In 1966, Millett became a committee member of National Organization for Women and subsequently joined the New York Radical Women, Radical lesbians, and Downtown Radical Women organizations.

She contributed the piece "Sexual politics (in literature)" to the 1970 anthology Sisterhood Is Powerful: An Anthology of Writings from the Women's Liberation Movement, edited by Robin Morgan.

She became a spokesperson for the feminist movement following the success of the book Sexual Politics (1970), but struggled with conflicting perceptions of her as arrogant and elitist, and the expectations of others to speak for them, which she covered in her 1974 book, Flying.

Millett was one of the first writers to describe the modern concept of patriarchy as the society-wide subjugation of women. Biographer Gayle Graham Yates said that "Millett articulated a theory of patriarchy and conceptualized the gender and sexual oppression of women in terms that demanded a sex role revolution with radical changes of personal and family lifestyles". Betty Friedan's focus, by comparison, was to improve leadership opportunities socially and politically and economic independence for women.

Millett wrote several books on women's lives from a feminist perspective. For instance, in the book The Basement: Meditations on a Human Sacrifice (1979), completed over four years, she chronicled the torture and murder of Indianapolis teenager Sylvia Likens by Gertrude Baniszewski in 1965 that had preoccupied her for 14 years. With a feminist perspective, she explored the story of the defenseless girl and the dynamics of the individuals involved in her sexual, physical and emotional abuse. Biographer Roberta M. Hooks wrote, "Quite apart from any feminist polemics, The Basement can stand alone as an intensely felt and movingly written study of the problems of cruelty and submission." Millett said of the motivation of the perpetrator: "It is the story of the suppression of women. Gertrude seems to have wanted to administer some terrible truthful justice to this girl: that this was what it was to be a woman".

Millett and Sophie Keir, a Canadian journalist, traveled to Tehran, Iran in 1979 for the Committee for Artistic and Intellectual Freedom to work for Iranian women's rights. Their trip followed actions taken by Ayatollah Khomeini's government to prevent girls from attending schools with boys, to require working women to wear veils, and not to allow women to divorce their husbands. Thousands of women attended a protest rally held at Tehran University on International Women's Day, March 8. About 20,000 women attended a march through the city's Freedom Square; many of whom were stabbed, beaten, or threatened with acid. Millett and Keir, who had attended the rallies and demonstrations, were removed from their hotel room and taken to a locked room in immigration headquarters two weeks after they arrived in Iran. They were threatened that they might be put in jail and, knowing that homosexuals were executed in Iran, Millett also feared she might be killed when she overheard officials say that she was a lesbian. After an overnight stay, the women were put on a plane that landed in Paris. Although Millett was relieved to have arrived safely in France, she was worried about the fate of Iranian women left behind, "They can't get on a plane. That's why international sisterhood is so important." She wrote about the experience in her 1982 book Going to Iran. Millett is featured in the feminist history film She's Beautiful When She's Angry (2014).

== Academic works ==
=== Sexual Politics ===
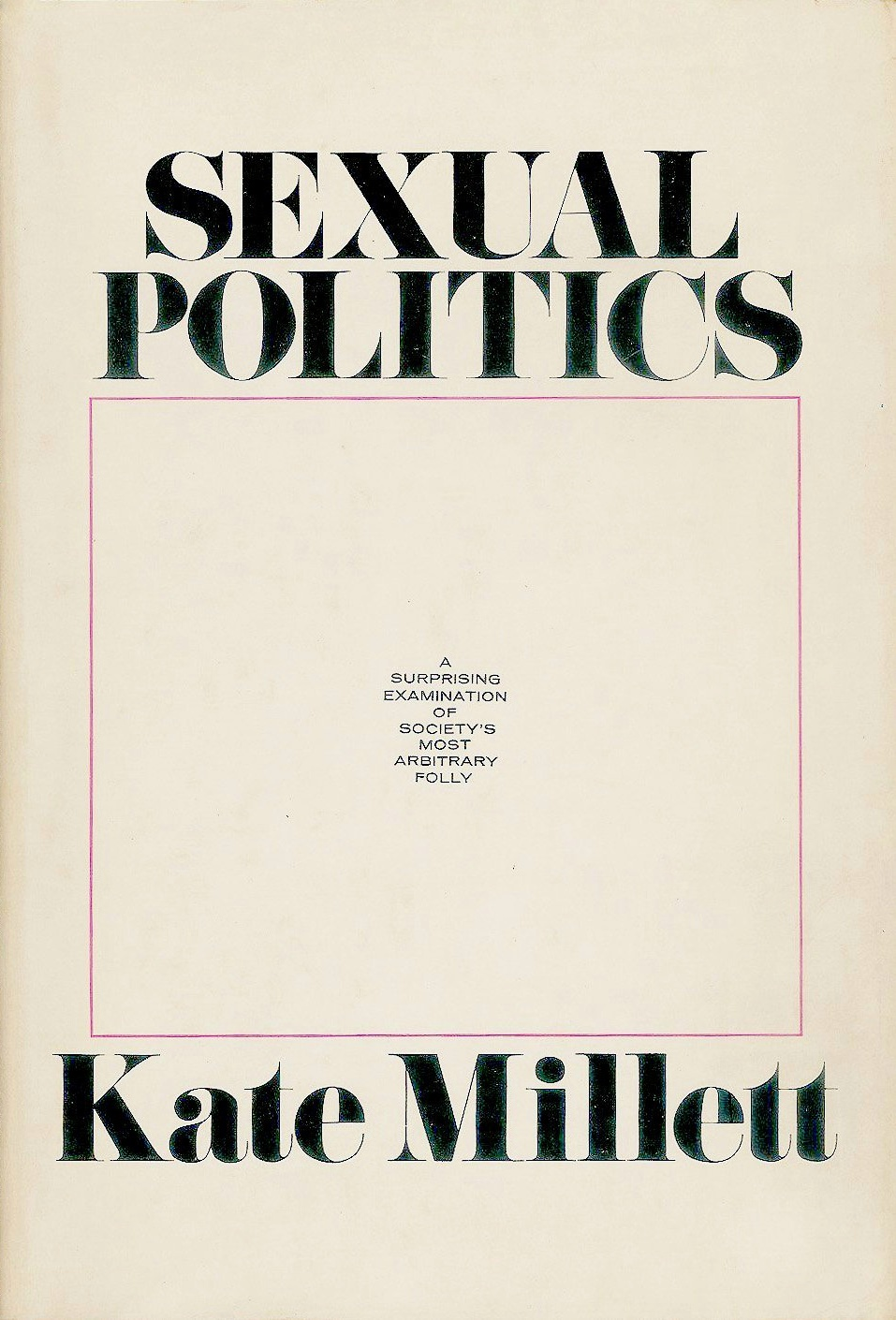
Cover of the first edition

Sexual Politics originated as Millett's PhD dissertation and was published in 1970, the same year that she was awarded her doctorate from Columbia University. The bestselling book, a critique of patriarchy in Western society and literature, addressed the sexism and heterosexism of the modern novelists D. H. Lawrence, Henry Miller, and Norman Mailer and contrasted their perspectives with the dissenting viewpoint of the homosexual author Jean Genet. Millett questioned the origins of patriarchy, argued that sex-based oppression was both political and cultural, and posited that undoing the traditional family was the key to true sexual revolution. In its first year on the market, the book sold 80,000 copies and went through seven printings and is considered to be the movement's manifesto.

As a symbol of the women's liberation movement, Millett was featured in a Time magazine cover story, "The Politics of Sex", which called Sexual Politics a "remarkable book" that provided a coherent theory about the feminist movement. Alice Neel created the depiction of Millett for the August 31, 1970, cover.

According to biographer Peter Manso, The Prisoner of Sex was written by Norman Mailer in response to Millett's Sexual Politics. Andrew Wilson, author of Norman Mailer: An American Aesthetic, noted that "The Prisoner of Sex is structured as a contest. His rhetoric against her prose, his charm against her earnestness, his polemic rage against her vitriolic charges. The aim is to convert the larger audience, the stronger presence as the sustaining truth. The Prisoner of Sex combines self parody and satire..."

=== Sexism and sexuality ===
While Millett was speaking about sexual liberation at Columbia University, a woman in the audience asked her, "Why don't you say you're a lesbian, here, openly. You've said you were a lesbian in the past." Millett hesitantly responded, "Yes, I am a lesbian". A couple of weeks later, Time's December 8, 1970, article "Women's Lib: A Second Look" reported that Millett admitted she was bisexual, which it said would likely discredit her as a spokesperson for the feminist movement because it "reinforce[d] the views of those skeptics who routinely dismiss all liberationists as lesbians." In response, a press conference was organized two days later in Greenwich Village by lesbian feminists Ivy Bottini and Barbara Love. It led to a statement in which 30 lesbian and feminist leaders declared their "solidarity with the struggle of homosexuals to attain their liberation in a sexist society".

Millett's 1971 film Three Lives is a 16 mm documentary made by an all-woman crew, including co-director Susan Kleckner, cameraperson Lenore Bode, and editor Robin Mide, under the name Women's Liberation Cinema. (Note: After its release, three women from the film crew sued Millett for violating the profit-sharing terms of their contract. Millett represented herself in court, with emotional outbursts. The judge ruled in the plaintiffs' favor, but Millett reluctantly paid only a portion of the earnings to the women.) The 70-minute film focuses on three women—Mallory Millett-Jones, the director's sister; Lillian Shreve, a chemist; and Robin Mide, an artist—reminiscing about their lives. Vincent Canby, The New York Times' art critic, wrote: "Three Lives is a good, simple movie in that it can't be bothered to call attention to itself, only to its three subjects, and to how they grew in the same male-dominated society that Miss Millett, in her Sexual Politics, so systematically tore apart, shook up, ridiculed and undermined—while, apparently, tickling it pink." It received "generally excellent reviews" following its premiere at a New York City theater.

In her 1971 book The Prostitution Papers, Millett interprets prostitution as residing at the core of the female's condition, exposing women's subjection more clearly than is done with marriage contracts. According to her, degradation and power, not sex, are being bought and sold in prostitution. She argues for the decriminalization of prostitution in a process directed by the sex workers themselves.

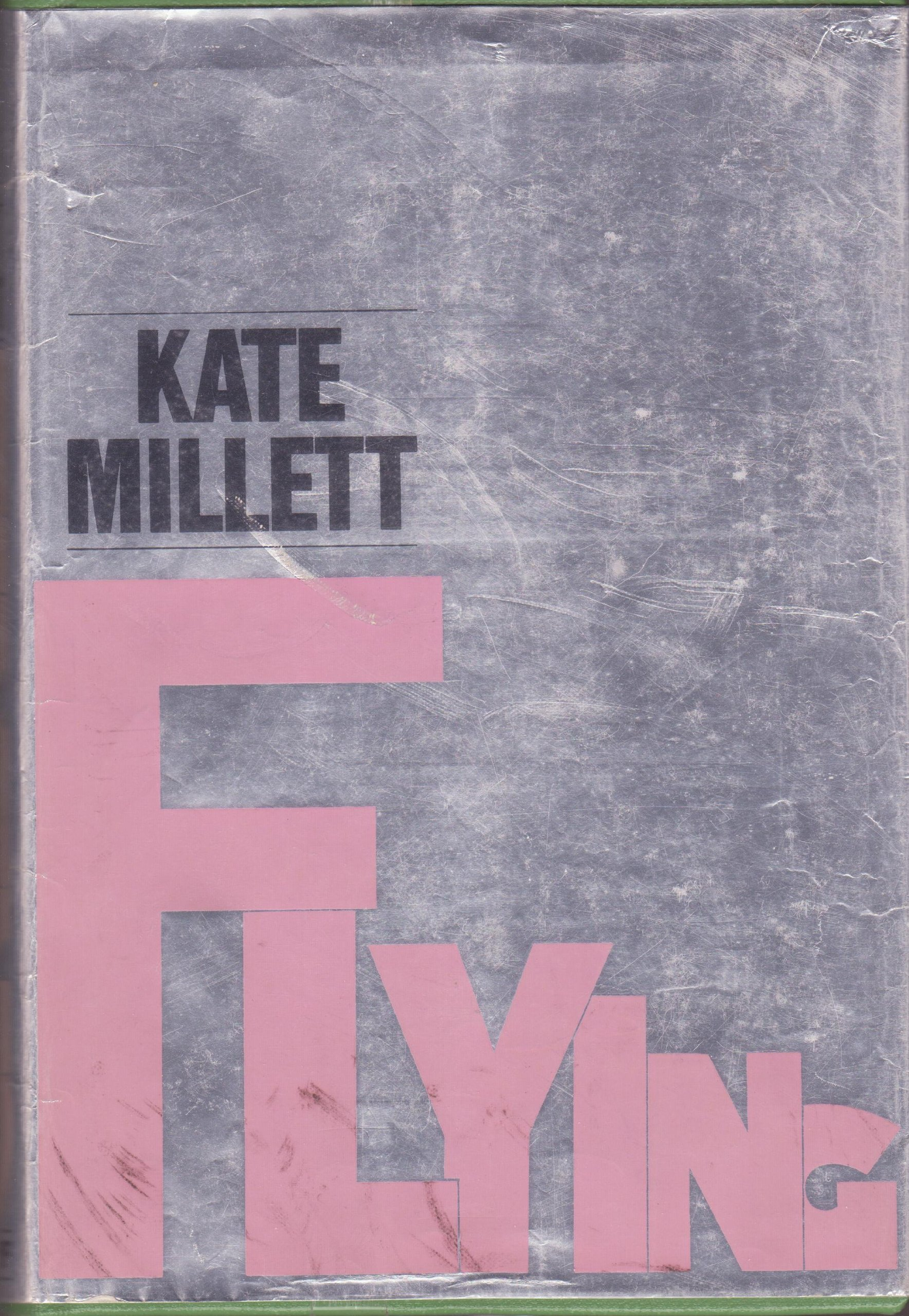
Flying book cover

In 1974 and 1977, respectively, Millett published two autobiographical books. The first was Flying (1974), a "stream-of-consciousness memoir about her bisexuality", which explores her life after the success of Sexual Politics in what was described in The New York Times Book Review as an example of "dazzling exhibitionism". Millett captured life as she thought, experienced and lived it, in a style like a documentary film. Sita (1977) explores her sexuality, particularly her lesbian lover who committed suicide and the effect on Millett's personal and private life. Millett and Sidney Abbott, Phyllis Birkby, Alma Routsong, and Artemis March were among the members of CR One, the first lesbian-feminist consciousness-raising group.

=== Views on pedophilia ===
In an interview with Mark Blasius, Millett was sympathetic to the concept of intergenerational sex, describing age of consent laws as "very oppressive" to gay male youth in particular but repeatedly reminding the interviewer that the question cannot rest on the sexual access of older men or women to children but a rethinking of children's rights broadly understood. Millett added that "one of children's essential rights is to express themselves sexually, probably primarily with each other but with adults as well" and that "the sexual freedom of children is an important part of a sexual revolution ... if you don't change the social condition of children you still have an inescapable inequality". In this interview, Millett criticized those who wished to abolish age-of-consent laws, saying the issue was not focused on children's rights but "being approached as the right of men to have sex with kids below the age of consent" and added that "no mention is made of relationships between women and girls".

=== Mother Millett ===
Kate wrote Mother Millett (2001) about her mother, who in her later years developed several serious health problems, including a brain tumor and hypercalcaemia. Made aware of her mother's declining health, Millett visited her in Minnesota; their visits included conversations about their relationship and outings to baseball games, museums, and restaurants. When her mother was no longer able to care for herself in her apartment, she was placed in a nursing home in St. Paul, Minnesota, which was one of Helen Millett's greatest fears. Kate visited her mother and was disturbed by the care she received and her mother's demoralized attitude. Nursing home residents who were labeled as "behavioral problems", as Helen was, were subject to forcible restraint. Helen said to Kate, "Now that you're here, we can leave."

Aware of the efforts her mother made to give her life, support her and raise her, Millett became a care-giver and coordinator of many daily therapies, and pushed her mother to be active. She wanted to give her "independence and dignity". In the article "Her Mother, Herself", Pat Swift wrote: "Helen Millett might have been content to go "gently into that good night"—she was after all more afraid of the nursing home than dying—but daughter Kate was having none of that. Feminist warrior, human rights activist, gay liberationist, writer and artist, Kate Millett has not gone gently through life and never hesitates to rage at anyone—friend or foe, family or the system—to right a perceived wrong. When the dignity and quality of her ailing mother's life was at stake, this book's unfolding tale became inevitable." Even though Helen played a role in having her daughter committed to the University of Minnesota's Mayo wing, Kate had her mother removed from the nursing home and returned to her apartment, where attendants managed her care. During this period, Millett could also "bully" her mother for her lack of cultural sophistication and the amount of television she watched and could be harsh with caregivers.

== Personal life ==
=== Interpersonal relationships ===
Millett was not the "polite, middle-class girl" that many parents of her generation and social circle desired; she could be difficult, brutally honest, and tenacious. Liza Featherstone, author of "Daughterhood Is Powerful", says that these qualities helped to make her "one of the most influential radical feminists of the 1970s." They could also make for difficult interpersonal relationships. Millett wrote several autobiographical memoirs, with what Featherstone calls "brutal honesty," about herself, her husband, lovers, and family. (Note: Of Millett's frankness about people close to her, Marilyn Yalom said in her Washington Post article, "What right did she have, I wondered (recalling what George Sand termed as 'Rousseau's Confessions' for disclosures made at other people's expense), to 'confess' so many others as she confessed herself?" Liza Featherstone wondered in her review of Mother Millett, "how Kate's sisters would tell this story.") Her relationship with her mother was strained by her radical politics, domineering personality, and unconventional lifestyle. Helen was particularly upset about examination of her lesbianism in her books. (Millett identified as bisexual by late 1970.) Family relationships were further strained after Millett was involuntarily committed to psychiatric wards and again when she wrote The Loony Bin Trip.

Millett focused on her mother in Mother Millett, a book about how she was made aware by her sister Sally of the seriousness of Helen Millett's declining health and poor nursing home care. Kate removed her mother from the home and returned her to an apartment, where caregivers managed her health and comfort. In the book, "Millett writes about the situation—her mother's distance and imperiousness, her family's failure to recognize the humanity of the old and the insane—with brutal honesty. Yet she also describes moments of forgiveness, humility and admiration." During this time, she developed a close relationship, previously inconceivable, with her mother, which she considered "a miracle and a grace, a gift." Her relationships with her sisters were troubled during this time, but they all came to support their mother's apartment-living. The suggestion of her role as the heroine in Mother Millett, however, may have been "at the expense of her two siblings".

=== Marriage ===
In 1961 Millett moved to Japan and met fellow sculptor Fumio Yoshimura. In 1963 Yoshimura and Millett left Japan and moved to New York's Lower East Side in the Bowery district. In 1965 they married to prevent Yoshimura from being deported, and during their marriage Millett said that they were "friends and lovers". She dedicated her book Sexual Politics to him. Author Estelle C. Jelinek says that during their marriage he "loves her, leads his own creative life, and accepts her woman lovers". In 1985 they were divorced. At the time of her death, Millett had recently married Sophie Keir, her partner for 39 years.

=== Mental illness ===
Mental illness affected Millett's personal and professional life from 1973, when she lived with her husband in California and was an activist and teacher at the University of California, Berkeley. Yoshimura and Sally, Kate's eldest sister, became concerned about Kate's extreme emotions. Her family claimed that she went for as many as five consecutive nights without sleep and could talk nonsensically for hours. During a screening of one of her films at University of California, Berkeley, Millett "began talking incoherently". According to her other sister, Mallory Millett-Danaher, "There were pained looks of confusion in the audience, then people whispered and slowly got up to leave." Sally, who was a law student in Nebraska, signed papers to have her younger sister committed. Millett was forcefully taken and held in psychiatric facilities for ten days. She signed herself out using a release form intended for voluntary admissions. During a visit to St. Paul, Minnesota, a couple of weeks later, her mother asked Kate to visit a psychiatrist and, based upon the psychiatrist's suggestion, signed commitment papers for Kate. She was released within three days, having won a sanity trial, due to the efforts of her friends and a pro bono attorney.

Following the two involuntary confinements, Millett became depressed, particularly so about having been confined without due process. While in the mental hospitals, she was given "mind-altering" drugs or restrained, depending upon whether she complied or not. She was stigmatized for having been committed and diagnosed with manic depression (now commonly called bipolar disorder). The diagnosis affected how she was perceived by others and her ability to attain employment. In California doctors had recommended that she take lithium to manage wide manic and depression swings. Her depression became more severe when her housing in the Bowery was condemned and Yoshimura threatened divorce. To manage the depression, Millett again began taking lithium.

In 1980, with support of two friends and photojournalist Sophie Keir, Millett stopped taking lithium to improve her mental clarity, relieve diarrhea and hand tremors, and better uphold her philosophies about mental health and treatment. She began to feel alienated and was "snappish" as Keir watched for behavioral changes. Her behavior was that of psychiatric drug withdrawal, including "mile-a-minute" speech, which turned her peaceful art colony to "a quarrelsome dystopia." Mallory Millett, having talked to Keir, tried to get her committed but was unsuccessful due to New York's laws concerning involuntary commitments.

Millett visited Ireland in the fall of 1980 as an activist. Upon her intended return to the United States, there was a delay at the airport and she extended her stay in Ireland. She was involuntarily committed in Ireland after airport security "determined from someone in New York" that she had a "mental illness" and had stopped taking lithium. While confined, she was heavily drugged. To combat the aggressive pharmaceutical program of "the worst bin of all", she counteracted the effects of Thorazine and lithium by eating a lot of oranges or hid the pills in her mouth for later disposal. She said of the times when she was committed, "To remain sane in a bin is to defy its definition," she said.

[Millett] describes with loathing the days of television-induced boredom, nights of drug-induced terror, people deprived of a sense of time, of personal dignity, even of hope. What crime justifies being locked up like this, Millett asks. How can one not be crazy in such a place?

— Journalist Mary O'Connell

After several days, she was found by her friend Margaretta D'Arcy. With the assistance of an Irish parliament member and a therapist-psychiatrist from Dublin, Millett was declared competent and released within several weeks. She returned to the United States, became severely depressed, and began taking lithium again. In 1986, Millett stopped taking lithium without adverse reactions. After one lithium-free year, Millett announced the news to stunned family and friends.

Millett's involvement with psychiatry caused her to attempt suicide several times due to both damaging physical and emotional effects but also because of the slanderous nature of psychiatric labeling that affected her reputation and threatened her very existence in the world. She believed that her depression was due to grief and feeling broken. She said, "When you have been told that your mind is unsound, there is a kind of despair that takes over..." In The Loony Bin Trip, Millett wrote that she dreaded her depressed periods:

At one point, listening to others talk about her "freaking out," Millett muses, "How little weight my own perceptions seem to have," and goes on: "Depression is the victim's dread, not mania. For we could enjoy mania if we were permitted by the others around us ... A manic person permitted to think ten thousand miles a minute is happy and harmless and could, if encouraged and given time, perhaps be productive as well. Ah, but depression – that is what we all hate. We the afflicted. Whereas the relatives and shrinks ... they rather welcome it: You are quiet and you suffer.

==== Views on mental illness ====
Feminist author and historian Marilyn Yalom wrote that "Millett refuses the labels that would declare her insane", continuing "she conveys the paranoid terror of being judged cruelly by others for what seems to the afflicted person to be a reasonable act."

==== Activism ====
Angered by institutional psychiatric practices and lenient involuntary commitment processes, (Note: She did not oppose "supportive, inquiring and sensitive psychotherapy.") Millett became an activist. With her lawyer, she changed the State of Minnesota's commitment law so that a trial is required before a person is involuntarily committed.

Millett was active in the anti-psychiatry movement. As a representative of MindFreedom International, she spoke out against psychiatric torture at the United Nations during the negotiations of the text of the Convention on the Rights of Persons with Disabilities (2005).

In 1978, Millett became an associate of the Women's Institute for Freedom of the Press (WIFP). WIFP is an American nonprofit publishing organization. The organization works to increase communication between women and connect the public with forms of women-based media.

=== Bowery redevelopment ===
In the late 1990s and early 2000s, Millett was involved in a dispute with the New York City authorities, who wanted to evict her from her home at 295 Bowery as part of a massive redevelopment plan. Millett and other tenants held out but ultimately lost their battle. Their building was demolished, and the residents were relocated.

== Scholarship ==
Kristan Poirot, author of Mediating a Movement, Authorizing Discourse, says that the release of Millett's Sexual Politics (1970) was a pivotal event in the second wave of the feminist movement. Although there were other important moments in the movement, like the founding of the National Organization for Women and release of The Feminine Mystique by Betty Friedan, it was in 1970 that the media gave greater attention to the feminist movement, first with a front-page article in The New York Times and coverage on the three network's news programs about the Women's Strike for Equality event that summer. Millett used psychology, anthropology, the sexual revolution, and literary criticism to explain her theory of sexual politics, which is that western societies have been driven by a belief that men are superior to women.

According to Poirot, the book, which received widespread media coverage, "was considered to be the first book-length exposition of second wave radical feminist theory." Published accounts of Millett's lesbianism played a part in the fracture in the feminist movement over lesbians' role within the movement and reduced her effectiveness as a women's rights activist. However, Millett identified as bisexual by late 1970. Scholar Camille Paglia described Millett's scholarship as deeply flawed, declaring that "American feminism's nose dive began" when Millett achieved prominence. According to Paglia, Millett's Sexual Politics "reduced complex artworks to their political content and attacked famous male artists and authors for their alleged sexism," thereby sending serious academic literary appreciation and criticism into eclipse.

Millett wrote her autobiographical books Flying (1974) and Sita (1977) about coming out as gay, partly an important consciousness-raising activity. She realized beginning an open dialogue is important to break down the isolation and alienation that hiding in privacy can cause. She wrote in Flying what Alice Henry calls in her off our backs review of Sita an "excruciating public and political 'coming out'" and its effect on her personal, political, and artistic lives. While she discussed some of her love affairs in Flying, in Sita she provides insight into a lesbian love affair and her fears of being alone or inadequate. Henry writes, "Kate's transparent vulnerability and attempts to get to the root of herself and grasp her lover are typical of many women who love women."

Millett recorded her visit to Iran and the demonstrations by Iranian feminists against the fundamentalist shift in Iran politics under Khomeini's government. Her book Going to Iran, with photography by Sophie Keir (1979), is "a rare and therefore valuable eyewitness account of a series of important developments in the history of Iranian women", albeit told from the perspective of a feminist from the western world.

== Death ==
Millett died in Paris on September 6, 2017, from cardiac arrest, eight days before her 83rd birthday. Her spouse Sophie Keir was with her at the time of her death.

== Awards and honors ==
Millett won the Best Books Award for Mother Millett from Library Journal in 2001. In 2012, she was awarded one of that year's Courage Award for the Arts by Yoko Ono, which Ono created to "recognize artists, musicians, collectors, curators, writers—those who sought the truth in their work and had the courage to stick to it, no matter what" and "honor their work as an expression of my vision of courage". Between 2011 and 2012, she was also awarded the Lambda Pioneer Award for Literature and a Foundation for Contemporary Arts Grants to Artists award (2012). She was honored in the summer of 2011 at a Veteran Feminists of America gala; attendees included feminists such as Susan Brownmiller and Gloria Steinem.

In March 2013, the U.S. National Women's Hall of Fame announced that Millett was to be among the institution's 2013 inductees. Beverly P. Ryder, board of directors co-president, said that Millett was a "real pillar of the women's movement". The induction ceremony took place on October 24, 2013, at the National Women's Hall of Fame headquarters in Seneca Falls, New York.

== Works ==
=== Books ===
List of books, with first edition details
Title	First edition details	
Title	Year	Publisher
Sexual Politics	1970	Doubleday
The Prostitution Papers: A Candid Dialogue	1973	Avon
Flying	1974	Alfred A. Knopf
Sita	1977	Farrar, Straus and Giroux
The Basement: Meditations on a Human Sacrifice	1979	Simon & Schuster
Going to Iran	1982	Coward, McCann & Geoghegan
The Loony-Bin Trip	1990	Simon & Schuster
The Politics of Cruelty: An Essay on the Literature of Political Imprisonment	1994	W. W. Norton & Company
A.D., A Memoir	1995	W. W. Norton & Company
Mother Millett	2001	Verso Books

=== Other publications ===
Title	Year	Publication
Journal chapters
"Sexual Politics: A Manifesto for Revolution"	1970	Firestone, Shulamith; Koedt, Anne (eds.). Notes from the Second Year: Women's Liberation. New York: New York Radical Women. pp. 111–112.
Book chapters
"The Prostitution Papers: A Quarter for Female Voice"	1971	Gornick, Vivian; Moran, Barbara K. (eds.). Woman in Sexist Society: Studies in Power and Powerlessness. Basic Books.
"Introduction"	1979	Holder, Maryse. Give Sorrow Words: Maryse Holder's Letters from Mexico. Grove Press.
"From the Basement to the Madhouse"	1997	O'Dell, Kathy (ed.). Kate Millett, Sculptor: The First 38 Years. Catonsville, Maryland: University of Maryland, Baltimore County. pp. 41–50.
"The Illusion of Mental Illness"	2007	Stastny, Peter; Lehmann, Peter (eds.). Alternatives Beyond Psychiatry. Berlin Eugene, Oregon: Peter Lehmann Publishing. pp. 29–38.
"Preface"	2014	Burstow, Bonnie; LeFrancois, Brenda; Diamond, Shaindl (eds.). Psychiatry Disrupted: Theorizing Resistance and Crafting the Revolution. Montreal: McGill/Queen's University Press.

- 1968 – "Token Learning: A Study of Women's Higher Education in America". New York: National Organization for Women.
- 1998 – "Out of the Loop". On the Issues.

=== Exhibitions ===
Some of her exhibitions and installations are:

- 1963 – Minami Gallery, Tokyo
- 1967 – Group exhibition, 12 Evenings of Manipulation, Judson Gallery, New York City
- 1968 – Situations, Brooklyn Community College, New York
- 1970 – The American Dream Goes to Pot, The People's Flag Show, Phoenix Art Museum; Judson Memorial Church, New York
- 1972 – Terminal Piece, Women's Interart Center, New York
- 1973 – Small Mysteries, Womanstyle Theatre Festival, New York
- 1977 – Naked Ladies, Los Angeles Women's Building, California
- 1977 – Solo exhibition, Andre Wauters Gallery, New York
- 1977 – The Lesbian Body, Chuck Levitan Gallery, New York
- 1978 – The Trial of Sylvia Likens, Noho Gallery, New York
- 1979 – Elegy for Sita, Noho Gallery, New York
- 1979 – Women's Caucus for Art
- 1980 – Group exhibition, Great American Lesbian Art Show, Los Angeles
- 1980 – Solo exhibition, Lesbian Erotica, Galerie de Ville, New Orleans; Second Floor Salon
- 1981 – Solo exhibition, Lesbian Erotica, Galerie des Femmes, Paris
- 1986 – Group exhibition, Feminists and Misogynists, Center on Contemporary Art, Seattle
- 1988 – Fluxus, Museum of Modern Art, New York
- 1991–1994 – Courtland Jessup Gallery, Provincetown, Massachusetts
- 1992 – Group exhibition, Body Politic, La MaMa La Galleria
- 1991 – Solo exhibition, Freedom from Captivity, Courtland Jessup Gallery, Provincetown, Massachusetts
- 1997 – Kate Millett, Sculptor: The First 38 Years, Fine Arts Gallery, University of Maryland, Catonsville
- 2009 – Black Madonna, multimedia show of 41 artists, HP Garcia Gallery, New York

=== Film ===
- Three Lives (documentary). Women's Liberation Cinema Company. 1971. "Producer"
- Not a Love Story: A Film About Pornography (documentary). National Film Board of Canada (NFB). 1981. "Herself, writer, artist"
- Bookmark: Daughters of de Beauvoir (1 episode) (biography). British Broadcasting Corporation (BBC), Union Pictures Productions. 1989. "Herself"
- Playboy: The Story of X (documentary). Calliope Films, Playboy Entertainment Group. 1998. "Herself"
- The Real Yoko Ono (television). 2001. "Herself"
- Des fleurs pour Simone de Beauvoir (documentary short) (in French). France. 2007. "Herself"
