= Michael Duhig =

Canadian actor and radio presenter

- Born: Charles Michael Duhig; 21 April 1953; Toronto, Ontario, Canada
- Died: 9 January 2010 (aged 56); Orillia, Ontario, Canada
- Occupation: actor
- Known for: Swiss Family Robinson

Charles Michael Duhig (21 April 1953 – 9 January 2010) was a Canadian actor and radio host.

He is noted for his appearances in television commercials from age 10 and his regular role in the television series Swiss Family Robinson (1974). Although Duhig attracted substantial amounts of fan mail for his work on Swiss Family Robinson, he left acting after the series was cancelled. He later became a presenter at a radio station in Kitchener, Ontario.

== Filmography ==
=== Television series ===
Year	Title	Role	Notes
1972	Almost Home/On the Move		OECA
1974	Swiss Family Robinson	Ernest	CTV
