= Madonna: Innocence Lost =

- Based on: Madonna Unauthorized by Christopher Andersen
- Written by: Michael J. Murray
- Directed by: Bradford May
- Starring: Terumi Matthews; Wendie Malick; Jeff Yagher; Diana Leblanc; Dean Stockwell
- Composers: Louis Natale; Tony Shimkin
- Country of origin: United States
- Original language: English

Production
- Producers: Christine A. Sacani; Michael J. Murray; Christopher Andersen
- Cinematography: Bradford May
- Editor: Bernadette Kelly
- Running time: 90 minutes
- Production companies: 20th Century Fox Television; Jaffe/Braunstein Films

Original release
- Network: Fox
- Release: November 29, 1994

Madonna: Innocence Lost is a 1994 American drama film directed by Bradford May and written by Michael J. Murray based on Christopher Andersen's biography of the star, Madonna Unauthorized. The film stars Terumi Matthews, Wendie Malick, Jeff Yagher, Diana Leblanc, Dean Stockwell and Nigel Bennett. The film premiered on Fox on November 29, 1994.

== Cast ==
- Terumi Matthews as Madonna
  - Stephane Scalia as Madonna (age 4)
  - Maia Filar as Madonna (age 10)
- Wendie Malick as Camille Barbone
- Jeff Yagher as Paul
- Diana Leblanc as Ruth Novak
- Dean Stockwell as Tony Ciccone
- Nigel Bennett as Bennett
- Dominique Briand as Toussant
- Don Francks as Jerome Kirkland
- Tom Melissis as Stu
- Christian Vidosa as Emmerich
- Rod Wilson as Mitch Roth
- Dino Bellisario as Brad Raines
- Gil Filar as Madonna's brother
- Diego Fuentes as Salvador
- Matthew Godfrey as Peter Barbone
- Ephraim Hylton as Thom Hillman
- Evon Murphy as Bette Ciccone
- Jenny Parsons as Madonna Louise Ciccone I
- Cynthia Preston as Jude O'Mally
- Chandra West as Kelsey Lee
- Jeff Woods as Flynn
- Mischke Butler as Doo-wop Singer

== Broadcast and reception ==
=== Accolades ===
The movie garnered a nomination for the Outstanding Individual Achievement in Costume Design for a Miniseries or a special in the 1995 Emmy Awards.
