= Inside/Out (1988 film) =

1988 Canadian short film

- Directed by: Lori Spring
- Written by: Lori Spring; Alan Zweig
- Produced by: Lori Spring
- Starring: Emma Richler; Jackie Burroughs
- Cinematography: Steven Deme
- Edited by: Lori Spring; Sally Patterson
- Music by: John Tucker
- Release date: 1988
- Running time: 27 minutes
- Country: Canada
- Language: English

Inside/Out is a Canadian drama short film, directed by Lori Spring and released in 1988. The film stars Emma Richler as Joanna, a woman who is suffering from clinical depression and has decided to stop leaving her home.

The cast also includes Jackie Burroughs, Larry Epp, Alan Zweig, Donna LaPointe, John Carr, Mark Fawcett and Rhonda Kristi.

The film received a Genie Award nomination for Best Live Action Short Drama at the 10th Genie Awards in 1989.
