= Women's Art Colony Farm =

Women's art community and farm in Poughkeepsie, New York

Women's Art Colony Farm (also referred to as The Farm or Women's Art Colony and Tree Farm) was a self-supporting women's artist colony in LaGrange, New York (outside of Poughkeepsie, New York) founded by Kate Millett and Sophie Keir in 1978.

== Founding ==
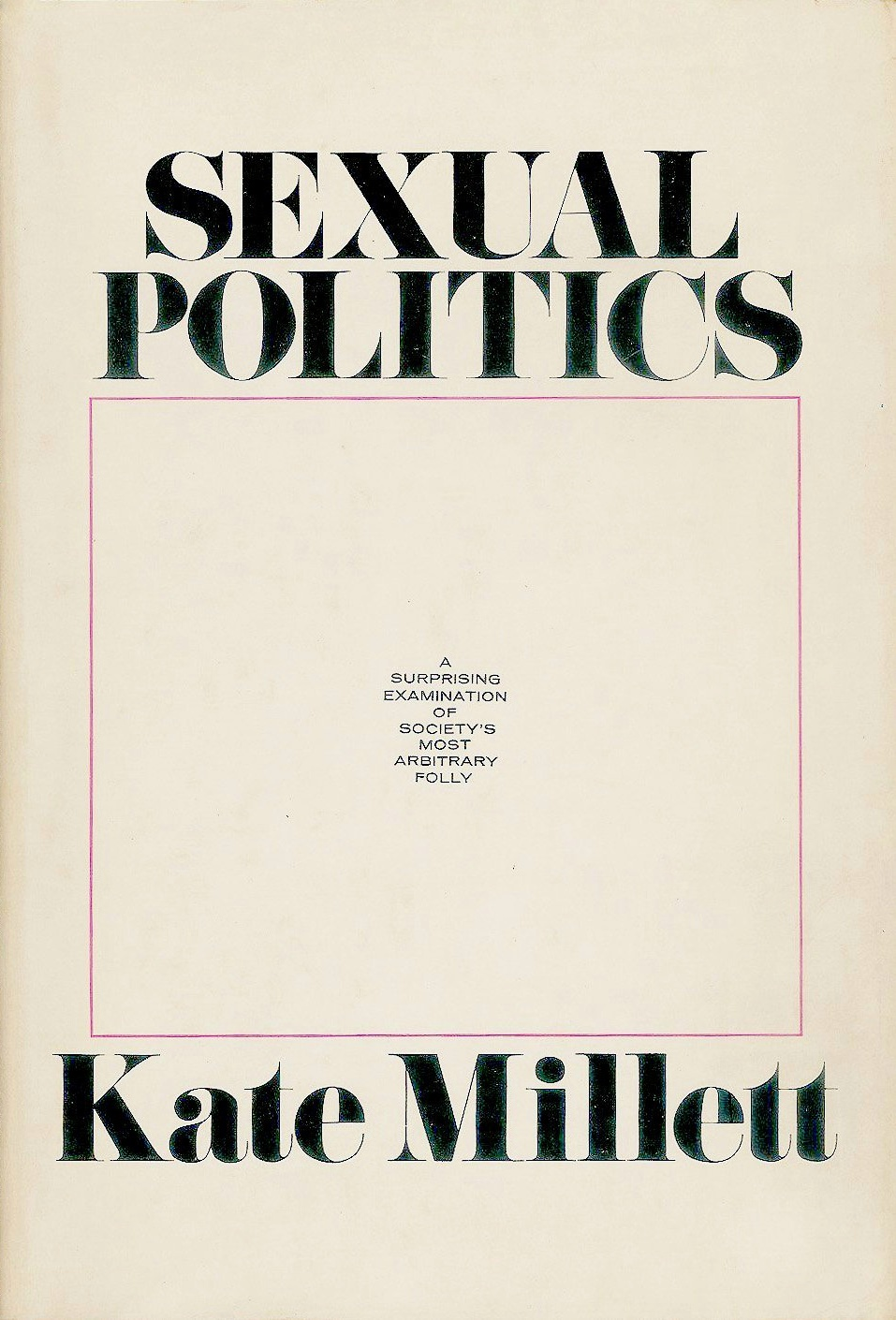
Cover of the first edition of Kate Millett's Sexual Politics, the proceeds of which contributed greatly to establishing The Farm.

In 1970 the artist and activist Kate Millett published Sexual Politics. The wildly popular book netted Millett approximately $30,000 in earnings. One year later, in 1971, Millett—along with future wife, photojournalist Sophie Keir—bought 10 acres of land and buildings in LaGrange, New York, a small town in Dutchess County and close to Poughkeepsie. The pair began restoring the property's fields and buildings.

In 1978, the Women's Art Colony was established, financed by selling Christmas trees.

Women applied to work at The Farm, also paying a small fee for food, in exchange for room, board and studio space.

The Farm was also a space for feminist discussion.

The New York Times described The Farm as:

"a utopian women’s arts colony, and where bare-breasted women grew Christmas trees that Ms. Millett would sell on the Bowery each December. In the early days, said Linda Clarke, an old friend, neighbors would complain about the nudity and call the police, until Ms. Millett won them over."

In 2012, The Farm was registered as a non-profit organization, and was renamed the Millett Center for the Arts.

== Awards ==
In 2012, Millett won a grant from the Foundation for Contemporary Arts to, in-part, create an archive of The Farm.

== Legacy ==
Sisters of Jam, an artists collective based in Stockholm, Sweden, created a book based on The Farm, called A Piece of Land. The collective was invited to stay at The Farm in 2010, by Millett. The book includes photographs by Michelle Koals and Jane Winter, past residents of The Farm, as well as archival artifacts. The collective have participated in several talks and exhibitions to showcase work based around The Farm.
