= The Politics of Cruelty: An Essay on the Literature of Political Imprisonment =

1994 book by Kate Millett

- Cover of the first edition, with a picture of Millett's Homage to the Old Men at the Houston Hotel (1976) by Jack Beshears.
- Author: Kate Millett
- Cover artist: Francine Kass
- Language: English
- Publisher: W. W. Norton & Company
- Publication date: 1994
- Publication place: United States
- Media type: Print
- Pages: 335
- ISBN: 0-393-31312-3

The Politics of Cruelty: An Essay on the Literature of Political Imprisonment is the eighth book by American feminist writer and activist Kate Millett. It was published in 1994 by W. W. Norton & Company. Advertised as Millett's "most important work since Sexual Politics" (1970), American writer E. J. Levy described it as "an examination of twentieth-century torture, as it is revealed through the literature of its witnesses".

== Reception ==
Kirkus Reviews stated that "the almost total absence of research or firsthand interviews, and the heavy-handed use of 'patriarchy' as a generic explanation for the world's ills are disappointing" and that Millett's final analysis "doesn't rise far over the level of op-ed exhortation". In a review from Socialist Review, Austin Challen found the book "a reminder of the barbarity of the capitalist state ... but offers no suggestions on how to organise in opposition". In a review in the journal Signs, Stanlie James described the book as "highly readable, passionate, and polemical", while also praising Millet's scrutiny and wide-ranging, comprehensive approach. As appears on the back cover, feminist scholar Catharine Stimpson said it is "perhaps her strongest book since Sexual Politics", and Stan Persky of Toronto Globe and Mail described it as an "eloquent, important book."
