= CBC Drama '73 =

Drama television series

- Genre: Drama anthology
- Country of origin: Canada
- Original language: English
- No. of seasons: 1
- No. of episodes: 8

Production
- Executive producer: Ron Weyman
- Running time: 60 minutes

Original release
- Network: CBC Television
- Release: 30 September – 2 December 1973

CBC Drama '73 is a Canadian drama anthology television miniseries that aired on CBC Television in 1973.

== Premise ==
This series of Canadian dramas included adaptations of novels.

== Scheduling ==
This hour-long series was broadcast on Sundays at 9:00 p.m. (Eastern) from 30 September to 2 December 1973.

== Episodes ==
| No. | Title | Directed by | Written by | Original release date |
|---|---|---|---|---|
| 1 | "More Joy in Heaven" | Ron Weyman | Ron Weyman | 30 September 1973 |
| 2 | "More Joy in Heaven" | Ron Weyman | Ron Weyman | 7 October 1973 |
Adapted from the novel More Joy in Heaven by Morley Callaghan, the film stars John Vernon as Kip Caley, an ex-convict struggling to rebuild his life after being released from prison. Cast also includes Linda Goranson, Budd Knapp and Paul Bradley. Aired in two parts on 30 September and 7 October.
| 3 | "Vicky" | René Bonnière | Grahame Woods | 14 October 1973 |
Stars Jackie Burroughs as Vicky, a woman who has been institutionalized after being found responsible for the death of her children, and is being examined by a psychiatrist (Julia Amato). The film was a sequel to Woods' 1970 CBC television film Twelve and a Half Cents, which centred on the children's deaths due to Vicky's negligence.
| 4 | "A Bird in the House" | Allan King | Patricia Watson | 21 October 1973 |
Adapted from Margaret Laurence's short story collection A Bird in the House. Stars Paul Harding, Louise Vallance, Wendy Thatcher, Patricia Hamilton and Nan Stewart.
| 5 | "Our Ms. Hammond" | Grahame Woods | Joseph Schull | 28 October 1973 |
A young secretary (Mia Anderson) finds herself the other woman in an affair with a married man. Cast also includes Michael Tait, Amelia Hall, Ruth Springford, Murray Westgate and Lynne Gorman.
| 6 | "Welcome Stranger" | Rudi Dorn | Kaino Thomas | 4 November 1973 |
A Swiss doctor (Horst Buchholz) who has recently immigrated to Canada, and is not yet licensed to practice medicine in Canada, finds himself in legal jeopardy after trying and failing to save a young boy's life in an emergency.
| 7 | "The Changeling" | Ron Weyman | Tony Sheer | 25 November 1973 |
Stars Neil Munro as a shy young man who turns to a life of crime.
| 8 | "Lighten My Darkness" | Graham Parker | Charles E. Israel | 2 December 1973 |
Diana Leblanc stars as a blind woman who regains her sight due to new advances in eye surgery, but who cannot cope with the ways in which her familiar world has changed.

== Awards ==
Burroughs' performance in Vicky won both ACTRA's Earle Grey Award for best television performance at the 3rd ACTRA Awards, and the Canadian Film Award for Best Actress in a Non-Feature at the 25th Canadian Film Awards, and Woods won the ACTRA Award for Best Writing in a Television Drama.

Leblanc and Vernon were both also nominated for the Earle Grey Award, and Charles Israel was nominated for Best Writing in Television Drama, at the ACTRA Awards.
