= Almost Home (Canadian TV series) =

Canadian television series

- Genre: Educational
- Country of origin: Canada
- Original language: English
- No. of episodes: 10

Production
- Running time: 15 minutes

Original release
- Network: TVOntario

Almost Home (a.k.a. On the Move) was an educational television show which was produced and broadcast by TVOntario (known at the time as the Ontario Educational Communications Authority) in 1972 and 1973. The premise of the show is about a young man from Cornwall, Ontario, Ken Matthews, who travels to Manitoba and returns into Ontario, hitchhiking his way home through Northern Ontario and southward. The stories of each episode detail the various people he meets in his travels. The show was also shown in junior high and high schools as a teaching tool.

== Actors and actresses ==
- Michael Duhig as Ken Matthews
- Beth Amos
- Jack Mather
- James Barron
- Mel Tuck
- Syd Brown
- Larry Reynolds
- Les Rubie

== Episodes ==
Ten episodes were broadcast. Another was scripted but never filmed. Here are the titles for all eleven:

- 1- "That’s a Nice Pair of Boots, Boy"- Ken meets a shopkeeper who accuses him of stealing a pair of boots.
- 2- "I'm Looking For Volunteers And You're It"- Ken is conscripted to help battle a forest fire.
- 3- "Words are Wild Birds"- Ken learns about business from the owners of a roadside service station. He also learns about music and poetry from a lovely, travelling musician and her friend.
- 4- "Playing the Angles"- Ken meets a smart, talkative fellow who shares insights on how to become successful. The two mistakenly attempt to catch two bank robbers at large.
- 5- "It's My Country and You Better Believe It"- On Manitoulin Island Ken learns about its rich native history from a local girl and an elderly native man.
- 6- "Just Talk to Us"- Ken witnesses the struggles between an immigrant construction owner and the union.
- 7- "All the World’s a Stage"- Ken hopes to take the bus to Niagara Falls but it is headed for Stratford for the Shakespeare Festival. He is not too keen on plays, but he meets some peers who help him to open his eyes to the arts. This episode was scripted but never filmed.
- 8- "An Old Man With A Suitcase Full Of Books"- Ken gets a job picking tobacco and meets a drifter who teaches him a valuable lesson.
- 9- "Remember All the Things We Were Going to Do?"- Ken heads to Niagara Falls to meet his childhood friend, who happens to have moved to Burlington, where he is raising a young family.
- 10- "Almost Home"- Ken heads back home when he meets a professional car racer, and an architect, whom he saves by driving him to the hospital. All of this makes Ken question his own future as he arrives home in Cornwall at the end of the episode.
- 11- "Never the Same Again"- The final program integrates Ken's adventures into a TV movie about his travels and his responsibility to others.

== Filming locations ==
- Kakabeka Falls, Ontario
- Wawa, Ontario
- Manitoulin Island
- Niagara Falls, Ontario
- Uxbridge, Ontario
- Schomberg, Ontario
- King City, Ontario
