= 1979 International Women's Day protests in Tehran =

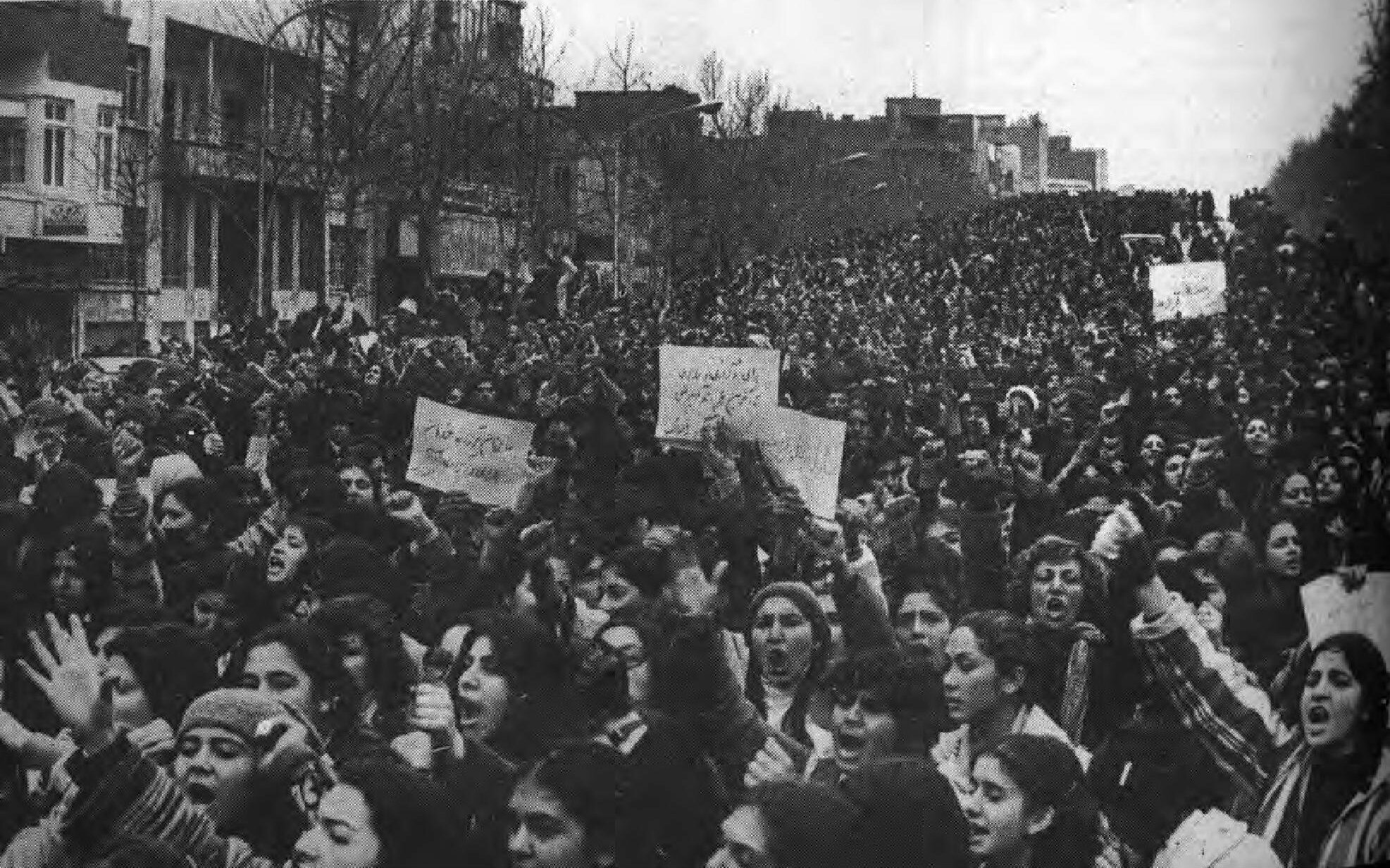
- 1979 Iranian Women Day's protests against compulsory Hijab
- Date: 8–14 March 1979
- Location: Tehran, Qom (Iran)
- Caused by: Opposition to the Islamic Republic and its policy on women's rights, specifically compulsory hijab
- Methods: Demonstrations
- Result: Women and women's rights activist victory Mandatory hijab laws postponed Tactical retreat of Islamist Khomeinist forces

Parties
Women and women's rights activists	Pro-Khomeini Islamist forces

Lead figures
	Ayatollah Khomeini

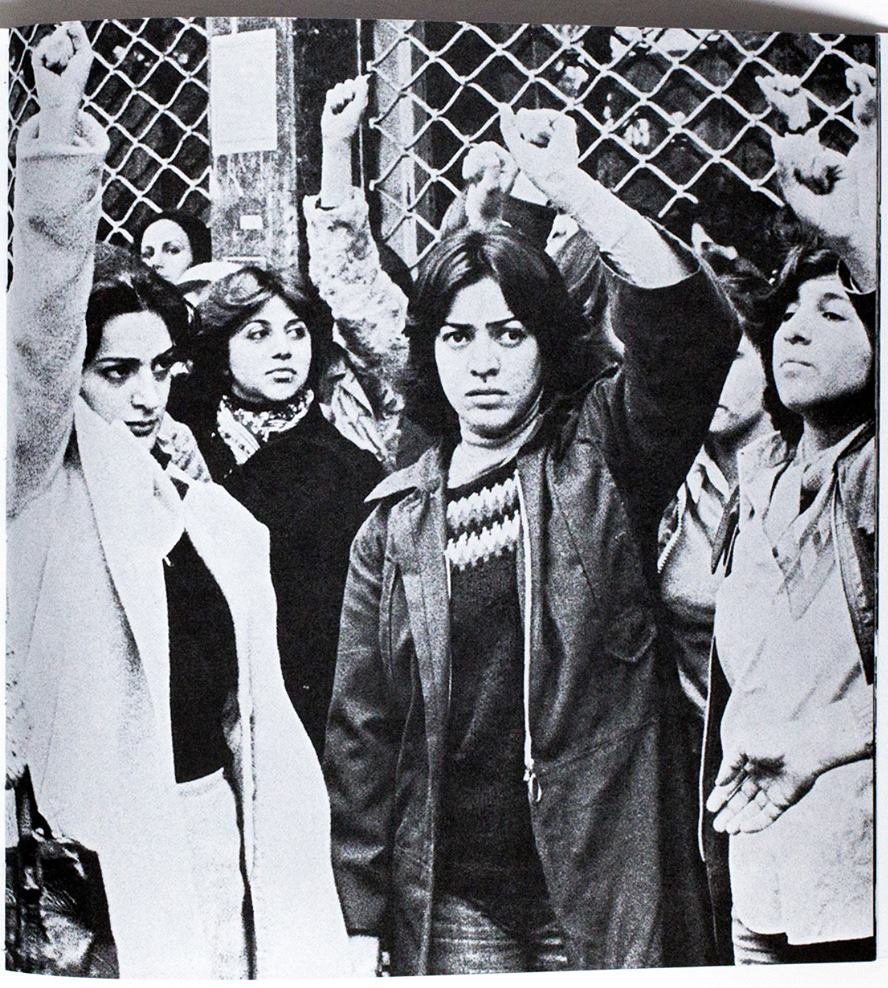
8 March 1979 protest in Tehran

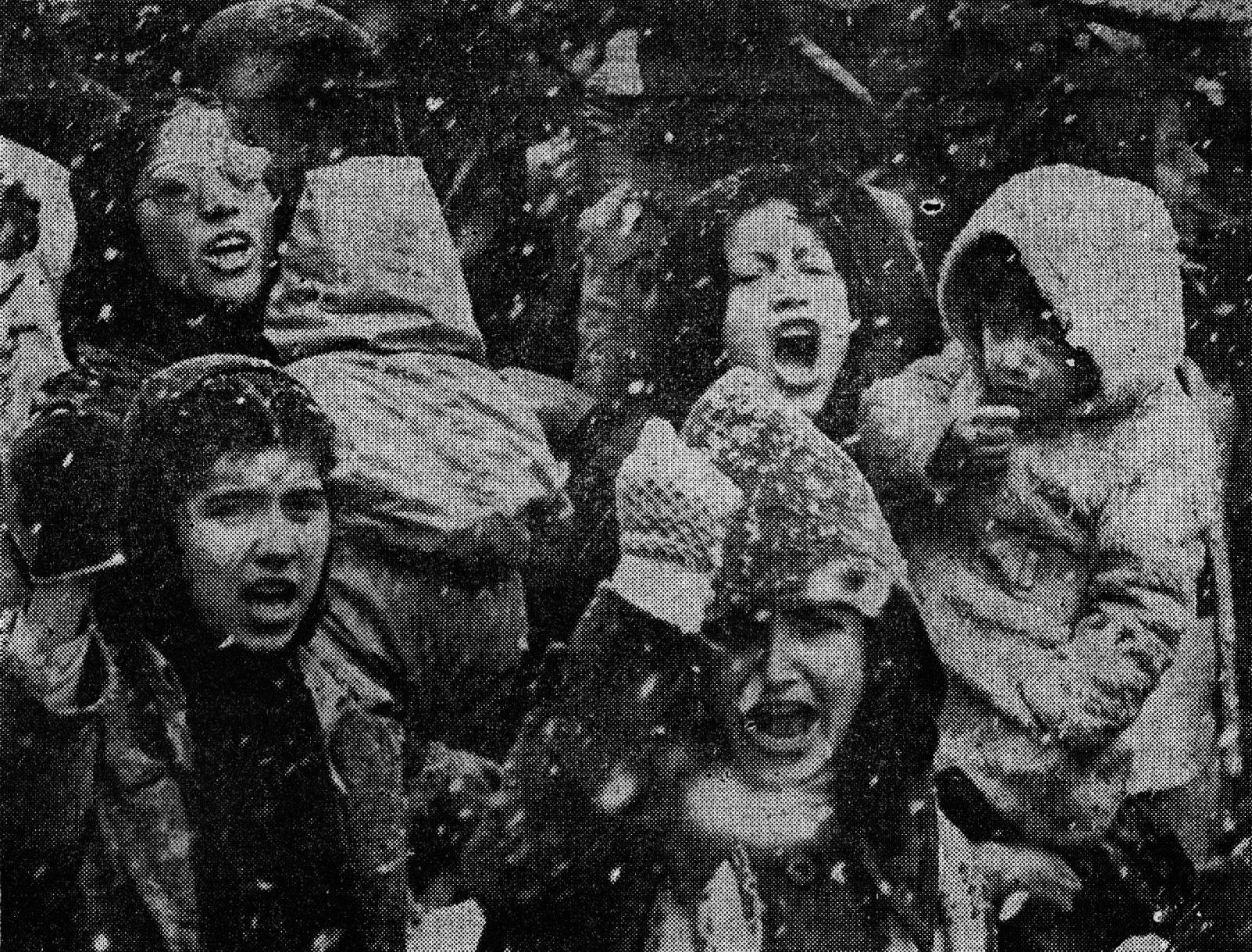
8 March 1979 protest in Tehran

On International Women's Day on 8 March 1979, a women's march took place in Tehran, Iran. The march was originally intended to celebrate the International Women's Day, but transformed into massive protests against the changes taking place in women's rights during the Iranian Revolution, specifically the introduction of mandatory hijab (veiling), which had been announced the day before. The protests lasted for six days, from 8 March to 14 March 1979, with thousands of women participating. The protests were met with violence and intimidation by pro-Khomeini Islamist forces.

The clerical-led Islamist faction at the time, lacking the capacity and hegemony to marginalize rival political contenders, were forced into retreat following the protests as far as these goals were concerned. Shortly after however, the Islamist faction mobilised Islamist women to rally on behalf of the new political and social order that they wished to implement. By June 1981, the greater part of Iran's liberal and leftist political spectrum was destroyed by the pro-Khomeini faction. Then, in 1983, the Iranian parliament (Majles) approved of a law "punishing women who refused to comply with state-enforced veiling". Ever since, such laws that favour mandatory veiling have become a key point in "policing women's political activism and dissidence", and have given Iran's post-1979 leadership a convenient pretext to "harass, intimidate, assault, and imprison women activists from across the ideological spectrum".

== Background ==
Veiling had been abolished in the Kashf-e hijab of 1936 during the reign of Reza Shah, and for a period of five years, veiling had been banned. From 1941 onward, under Reza Shah's son and successor Mohammad Reza Pahlavi, women had been free to dress as they wished. However, under his regime, the chador was considered a badge of backwardness, and an indicator of being a member of the lower class. Veiled women were assumed to be from conservative religious families, with limited education, while unveiled women were assumed to be from the educated and professional upper- or middle class.

During the revolution of the late 1970s, hijab became a political symbol. Hijab was considered by conservative traditionalists as a sign of virtue, and, thus, unveiled women as the opposite. Unveiled women came to be seen by some of the opposition as a symbol of Western culture colonialism, Westoxication; as a propagator of "corrupt Western culture", undermining the traditionalist conception of "morals of society"; and as overly dressed up "bourgeois dolls", who had lost their honor. The hijab was considered by the Pahlavis as a rejection of their modernization policy, and, thereby, of their rule, and during the Iranian revolution, many secular non-conservative women belonging to the opposition had worn the veil, since it had become a symbol of opposition against the Pahlavi regime.

During the mass protests leading to the revolution, women participating in the protests often wore the veil, and women who appeared unveiled were often harassed by fundamentalist revolutionaries. Two slogans of the 1979 revolution were: "Wear a veil, or we will punch your head" and "Death to the unveiled". In 1978–1979, in the dawn of the Islamic Revolution, the anti-Shah front consisted of a very broad group of liberals, religious nationalists, militant Islamists, Marxists-Leninists, bazaaris, and striking oil workers. Yet it was Ayatollah Khomeini, a Shia cleric, who quickly established himself as the revolution's major leader. In his goal to overthrow the shah, he actively encouraged women to join the cause, but, simultaneously, showed little to no indication that he wanted to introduce mandatory veiling, or even wished to abrogate specific women's rights in a post-revolutionary Iran. It was upon his return to Iran that his rhetoric and that of his political allies quickly shifted.

There had been no formal law issued mandating the veil immediately following the revolution, but since unveiled women were often harassed and put under pressure, many of them resorted to wear the veil to avoid harassment.

On 7 March 1979, Ayatollah Khomeini decreed mandatory veiling for all women in their workplace, and decreed that women were no longer to enter their workplace or a government office unveiled, which he termed as "naked":

"At Islamic ministries, women should not appear naked. Women can be present so long as they are with hijab. They face no barrier to work as long as they observe Islamic hijab."

However, non-conservative women, who had worn the veil as a symbol of opposition during the revolution, had not expected veiling to become mandatory, and when the mandatory veil decree became known, it was met with protests and opposition, particularly by liberal and leftist women.

The veil decree was received by many as evidence that, despite having fought in the revolution, women were being relegated, as one protest leader expressed it, "back to dog status". There was a fear among women that they were about to lose the civil rights gained under the Shah.

== The protests ==
On the morning of 8 March, tens of thousands of women gathered outside the new Prime Minister's office in Tehran. A further 3,000 women went to protest in the religious city of Qom, which was the residence of Ayatollah Khomeini. The protestors appeared unveiled. The women who participated were from all backgrounds, although the majority were middle-class and educated.

The women chanted protests against the attempts to limit their rights, such as, "We didn't have a revolution to go backwards". One protestor recalled, "There was no question in our mind that this is the first step to suppress us, and we should stand up to it – both as women [and] as revolutionaries." Another slogan chanted was, "In the dawn of freedom, there is an absence of freedom".

Protesters said that many Muslim activists regarded unveiled women as "unclean", since they had taken the Ayatollah's remarks literally. One protester said:

"If a doorman throws an eggplant at you when you try to enter a government office, that isn't Imam Khomeini's fault, that is the doorman's fault", one protester said. "They can clarify and try to appease us all they want, but until the revolution tells the people that it is all right for women to wear modem dress, to earn decent wages, to hold good jobs, and not to bow and scrape, we will be harassed from the moment we leave our homes."

Militiamen were reportedly restrained, but guns were fired in the air when the women and their counter-protestors appear to be near collision.

Male supporters formed human chains on both sides of the women protesters marchers to shield them. However, the chain were broken up on several occasions, and some protesters were attacked. The women protestors were attacked at the streets by mobs of counter-protestors with knives, stones, bricks, and broken glass. Both male bystanders as well as veiled women in chadors shouted epithets to the protesters.

During one demonstration, 15,000 protesters took over the Palace of Justice for a three-hour sit-in. The protestors had a list of eight demands read. The list included the right of choice of dress; equal civil rights with men; no discrimination in political, social, and economic rights; and a guarantee of full security for women's legal rights and liberties.

== Reactions in Iran ==
Government and Islamic leaders attempted to calm the protests. The Ayatollah's aides reacted to the protests by saying that he had merely called for the wearing of "modest dress". This statement by Mahmoud Taleghani from the government, assuring the public that the hijab would not be enforced, only encouraged, resulted in calming the protests.

== International reactions ==
The protests were given some solidarity from feminists abroad. Feminists from Germany, France, Egypt, and a number of other countries united to form a Solidarity Committee (CIDF). A delegation of solidarity was sent by the International Committee for Women's Rights (another name for the Solidarity Committee or CIDF), chaired by Simone de Beauvoir.

The protests were attended by the American feminist Kate Millett, who had been invited to attend by student activists. Millett said:

"I'm here because it's inevitable", she added. "This is the eye of the storm right now. Women all over the world are looking here. It's a whole corner, the Islamic world, the spot we thought it would be hardest to reach, and, wow, look at it go!"

A 12-minute documentary about the protests was made by the militant French feminist group, Psychoanalysis and Politics, who attended the march while documenting what they saw. The documentary remains the only existing film of those events.

== Results and aftermath ==
The protests resulted in a temporary retraction of the decree of mandatory veiling. When the left and the liberals were eliminated by June 1981, and the conservatives secured solitary control, however, veiling was enforced on all women. This began with the "Islamification of offices" in July 1980, when unveiled women were refused entry to government offices and public buildings, and banned from appearing unveiled at their work place, under risk of being fired. On the streets, unveiled women were attacked by revolutionaries. In July 1981, an edict of mandatory veiling in public was introduced, which was followed in 1983 by an Islamic Punishment Law introducing corporal punishment on unveiled women: "Women who appear in public without hijab will be sentenced to whipping up to 74 lashes." The law was enforced by members of the Islamic Revolution Committees patrolling the streets, and later by the Guidance Patrols, also called the Morality Police.

Ever since, such laws that favour mandatory veiling have become a key point in "policing women's political activism and dissidence", and have given Iran's post-1979 leadership a convenient excuse to "harass, intimidate, assault, and imprison women activists from across the ideological spectrum".

== See also ==
- Acid attacks on women in Isfahan
- Iranian protests against compulsory hijab
- Mahsa Amini protests
