= Swiss Family Robinson (1974 TV series) =

- Created by: Johann David Wyss (novel)
- Starring: Chris Wiggins; Diana Leblanc
- Country of origin: Canada
- Original language: English
- No. of episodes: 26

Production
- Executive producer: Gerald Mayer
- Running time: 30 minutes

Original release
- Network: CTV
- Release: September 1974 – 1975

Swiss Family Robinson is a 1974–75 Canadian television drama series, based on Johann David Wyss' 1812 novel The Swiss Family Robinson.

The series consisted of twenty-six 30-minute episodes, and diverged somewhat from the original novel. Only one season was produced, due to the development of a Swiss Family Robinson series in 1975 by ABC in the United States. This situation precluded sales of the Canadian series to the lucrative American market. Reruns, however, continued to be syndicated in Canada for many years, with stations often scheduling the program as part of their Saturday morning line-up.

== Cast ==
- Diana Leblanc as Elizabeth Robinson (Mother)
- Chris Wiggins as Johann Robinson (Father)
- Michael Duhig as Ernest Robinson
- Ricky O'Neill as Franz Robinson
- Heather Graham as Marie Robinson

== Production ==
The series was produced by CTV, and Trident Television. Filming of beach scenes was conducted in Jamaica, while jungle scenes were filmed in Kleinburg, Ontario, Canada.

== Characters ==
- Johan Robinson – referred to mostly as father, by sons Ernest and Franz and papa by daughter Marie. A strong father figure, the children respect him. He in turn, is understanding, yet firm on the decisions he makes. Each episode begins and ends with a narration from a journal he was keeping.
- Elizabeth Robinson – Mother to her 3 children, strong, like her husband, it was her idea to build the treehouse. She is compassionate, yet can be tough when the situation calls for it.
- Ernest Robinson – oldest child, at 17, he helps his father protect the family. Ernest at times longs to be independent, can be over confident at times, which some times gets him into trouble, but otherwise, is protective, and cares very much for his younger brother and sister.
- Franz Robinson – at 13 years old, Franz, is very intelligent, and very inquisitive. He was separated from his family during the storm that caused them to be marooned on the island, and after a few days found his family. Franz, at times feels competitive with older brother Ernest, and often wishes his family would let him have more grown up responsibilities.
- Marie Robinson – 8 year old Marie is the only character not to appear in the original story. In this version, the Robinsons have a young daughter. Marie is known for finding dangerous animals, like wild boars, lions, snakes. Marie is also known for her sense of humor, although, whether or not her jokes are funny, is debatable. Her brothers have been known to run away from her jokes, which was a running theme on the show.

== DVD release ==
The Swiss Family Robinson – The Complete Series was released on DVD by Morningstar Entertainment on 20 March 2007 in a 4-disc set. The DVDs are Region 1, NTSC format, digitally enhanced and colour-corrected. One special feature on the discs is a split-screen demonstration of the enhancement.

The DVD cover features a compass and a logo but not the one used on the TV series. There are a few cast-specific photos on the back.

The series received a second DVD release in 2009 (released this time by Image Entertainment) as a 3-disc set.

== List of episodes ==
1. "The Arrival" – 10 January 1974
2. "Bruno" – 9 February 1801
3. "Dead Man's Gold" – 11 February 1801
4. "The Secret of Shark Island" – 4 March 1801
5. "Nature's Child" – 28 March 1801
6. "Return from Paradise" – 28 March 1801
7. "The Animal Kingdom" – 4 April 1801
8. "Disappearance" – 13 May 1801
9. "The Weakest Link" – 23 May 1801
10. "Somewhere on this Earth" – 11 June 1801
11. "Rogue" – 9 July 1801
12. "A Time to Live & A Time to Die" – 12 July 1801
13. "Skeleton Clue" – 1 August 1801
14. "Lost at Sea" – 4 August 1801
15. "Deadly Feast" – 11 August 1801
16. "The Visitor" – 13 August 1801
17. "Cave of the Tiger" – 19 August 1801
18. "Attack of the Cat" – 11 September 1801
19. "Curse of the Idol" – 11 September 1801
20. "The Intruder" – 22 September 1801
21. "Second Honeymoon" – 13 October 1801
22. "Monsoon" – 27 October 1801
23. "The Mark of Captain Keel" – 4 November 1801
24. "The Castaway" – 26 November 1801
25. "Rescue!" – 8 December 1801
26. "Terror on South Island" – 11 December 1801
