= Courage Award for the Arts =

- Sponsored by: Yoko Ono Lennon
- Country: USA
- Presented by: Yoko Ono Lennon
- First award: 2009
- Website: https://imaginepeace.com

The Courage Award for the Arts is a private award presented annually by Yoko Ono Lennon to artists, musicians, collectors, curators, writers who sought the truth in their work and demonstrated leadership, courage, resourcefulness in their work, and risked their careers by pursuing a larger vision of the local or national interest despite pressure to succumb to commercial and political constraints.

These awards are very meaningful to me. I’m deeply inspired by all the honorees—by their courage, their determination, their spirit. In their own ways, they’re all working for peace.

— Yoko Ono Lennon, Courage Award for the Arts

The award was established in 2009 by Yoko Ono Lennon. Courage Award for the Arts laureates receive a prize of US$25,000.

== Recipients ==
- 2016:
  - Laurie Anderson
  - Mohammed el Gharani
- 2014:
  - Laurie Anderson
  - Valie Export
  - Marianne Faithfull
  - Gustav Metzger
- 2013: Julian Assange
- 2012:
  - Nabeel Abboud-Ashkar
  - Sabine Breitwieser and Jenny Schlenzka
  - Kate Millett
  - Carolee Schneemann
  - Martha Wilson
- 2011:
  - Simone Forti
  - Jean-Jacques Lebel
  - Meredith Monk
  - Yvonne Rainer
- 2010:
  - Guerrilla Girls
  - GuerrillaGirlsBroadBand
  - Guerrilla Girls On Tour
  - Printed Matter
  - Émile Zola
- 2009:
  - Gilbert and Lila Silverman
  - La Monte Young and Marian Zazeela
