= A Winter Tan =

- Directed by: Jackie Burroughs; Louise Clark; John Frizzell; John Walker; Aerlyn Weissman
- Written by: Jackie Burroughs; John Frizzell; Maryse Holder (book)
- Produced by: Dulce Kuri; Servando Gaja
- Starring: Jackie Burroughs; Hernando Gonzáles
- Cinematography: John Walker
- Edited by: Allan Lee; Susan Martin
- Music by: Ahmed F. Hassan; John Lang
- Production company: Canada Council for the Arts
- Distributed by: Circle Films
- Release date: 29 June 1989 (Australia)
- Running time: 91 minutes
- Country: Canada
- Language: English

A Winter Tan is a 1987 Canadian drama film. Based on the book Give Sorrow Words by Maryse Holder, the film stars Jackie Burroughs as Holder.

The screenplay was written by Burroughs and John Frizzell, and the film was directed and produced jointly by Burroughs, Frizzell, Louise Clark, John Walker and Aerlyn Weissman.

== Plot summary ==
Jackie Burroughs stars as Maryse Holder, the ill-fated feminist author who met an untimely death in Acapulco. Her behavior toward Mexican men was to regard them as subjects for the pursuit of sexual and romantic adventure. Her own pursuits of sex, booze and love lead to her death at the hands of one of her many macho partners.

== Cast ==
- Jackie Burroughs as Maryse Holder
- Erando Gonzalez as Miguel Novaro
- Anita Olanick as Pam
- Diane D'Aquila as Edith

== Awards ==
Burroughs won the Genie Award for Best Actress.
