= Maryse Holder =

American memoirist and feminist writer (1940–77)

- Born: October 19, 1940; Paris, France
- Died: September 1977 (aged 36); Mexico
- Cause of death: Murder
- Education: Brooklyn College; Cornell University
- Occupation: Writer

Maryse Holder (October 19, 1940 – September 1977) was an American memoirist and feminist writer, who was the author of Give Sorrow Words. The book was published posthumously in 1979 by Grove Press, with an introduction by feminist author Kate Millett, after Holder was murdered in Mexico in 1977, at the age of 36.

== Early life ==
Maryse Holder was born in Paris on October 19, 1940. Her mother, a member of the French Resistance, died in a concentration camp after being sent to Nazi Germany by the Vichy government. She came to the United States with her father when she was seven years old, as a stateless person.

== Education ==
Holder graduated from Brooklyn College. She was a graduate student at Cornell University, where she studied under Paul de Man, and a PhD candidate in Comparative Literature at City University of New York.

== Career and publications ==
After being dismissed as a professor at City University in a mass firing, due to New York city fiscal problems, Holder decided to pursue a life exploring sexual adventure in Mexico. While in Mexico, she wrote a series of letters describing her experiences to Edith Jones, a friend in New York City, from which she hoped to "wring a masterpiece from my life." Following Holder's brutal murder in Mexico under mysterious circumstances, the letters became the basis for the book Give Sorrow Words: Maryse Holder's Letters from Mexico. It was adapted to film in 1987, under the title A Winter Tan.
