= The Days Before Yesterday =

- Genre: Historical documentary
- Written by: Peter C. Newman
- Directed by: Brian Nolan; Edmund Reid; Munroe Scott
- Presented by: Bruce Hutchinson
- Starring: Karl Starling; Will Hosker
- Narrated by: Bruce Hutchinson
- Country of origin: Canada
- Original language: English
- No. of seasons: 1
- No. of episodes: 7

Production
- Producer: Cameron Graham

Original release
- Network: CBC Television
- Release: 4 November – 16 December 1973

The Days Before Yesterday is a Canadian historical documentary television miniseries that aired on CBC Television in 1973.

== Premise ==
The series covered developments in Canadian history from 1897 to 1957.

== Episodes ==
1. 4 November 1973: "The Jewel in the Crown" concerns the administrations of Wilfrid Laurier and Robert Borden between 1897 and 1917 during which time conflict with Quebec developed and ending with Canada's participation in World War I (Brian Nolan director)
2. 11 November 1973: "Lord Byng, Canada Welcomes You" concerns the administrations of Arthur Meighen and William Lyon Mackenzie King as World War I ends and the Great Depression begins; other events include the 1919 Winnipeg General Strike, Prohibition and the development of western Canadian immigration (Brian Nolan director)
3. 18 November 1973: "The Best of Times. . . The Worst of Times" concerns the administration of R. B. Bennett during the Depression (Brian Nolan director)
4. 25 November 1973: "King or Chaos" concerns the administration of William Lyon Mackenzie King as Canadian life transitions from the Depression to World War II (Brian Nolan director)
5. 2 December 1973: "For King and Country" concerns the culture, economy and military participation of Canada during World War II (Munroe Scott director)
6. 9 December 1973: "King of Canada" concerns post-war growth and rebuilding in Canada, during the last years of Mackenzie King's administration, and concerns Canada's reactions to the international development of Communism (Munroe Scott director)
7. 16 December 1973: "Chairman of the Board" concerns the work of Prime Minister Louis St. Laurent until his defeat by John Diefenbaker in 1957 (Edmund Reid director)

== Scheduling ==
This hour-long series was broadcast Sundays at 10 p.m. from 4 November to 16 December 1973. It was rebroadcast from April to June 1976.
