= In the South Seas =

- Genre: Travel
- Written by: George Woodcock
- Narrated by: George Woodcock
- Country of origin: Canada
- Original language: English
- No. of seasons: 1
- No. of episodes: 9

Production
- Producer: Gordon Babineau
- Camera setup: William Brayne
- Running time: 30 minutes

Original release
- Network: CBC Television
- Release: 10 September – 19 November 1973

In the South Seas is a Canadian travel documentary television series that aired on CBC Television in 1973.

== Premise ==
George Woodcock wrote and hosted this series featuring the life and culture of various Pacific Ocean nations such as British Solomon Islands, Fiji, Gilbert Islands, New Caledonia, New Hebrides, Tonga and Western Samoa.

Woodcock published the 1976 book South Sea Journey which included research seen on this series.

== Scheduling ==
This half-hour series was broadcast on Mondays at 10:00 p.m. (Eastern) from 10 September to 19 November 1973.
