= Diana Leblanc =

Canadian actress

- Born: 1943 (age 81–82); Montreal, Quebec, Canada
- Education: National Theatre School of Canada
- Occupation: Actress
- Known for: Swiss Family Robinson; More Tales of the City; Further Tales of the City

Diana Leblanc (born 1943) is a Canadian television and film actress, best known to US audiences for her portrayal of Frannie Halcyon in the TV miniseries More Tales of the City (1998) and its follow-up Further Tales of the City (2001). These miniseries were sequels to Tales of the City (1994), which starred Nina Foch in the role of Frannie.

== Early life and education ==
Leblanc was born in Montreal and enrolled in the French program at the National Theatre School of Canada, switching to the English program in her second year. She was a founding member of the Soulpepper Theatre Company in Toronto and a member of the Neptune Theatre company in Halifax. Leblanc was artistic director for the Théâtre français de Toronto.

== Career ==
Leblanc had roles in the films Mahoney's Last Stand, Lies My Father Told Me and The Third Walker and the television series Swiss Family Robinson. She played Grace Elliott, the mother of Pierre Trudeau, in the 2005 television miniseries Trudeau II: Maverick in the Making. She also appeared in the television series North of 60.

As a director, she has worked not only in the theatre but in radio, directing 75 one-minute radio dramas for the Bronfman Heritage Minutes series, when it evolved from film into radio. Leblanc has directed at the Stratford Shakespeare Festival including a 1994 production of Long Day's Journey into Night, at the National Arts Centre in Ottawa, at the Segal Centre for Performing Arts in Montreal and at the Tarragon Theatre in Toronto. She has also directed productions for the Canadian Opera Company, Calgary Opera, Pacific Opera Victoria and the International Opera Centrum in Amsterdam. She continues to work in Toronto theatre as a director.

In 2015, Leblanc received a Governor General's Performing Arts Award for Lifetime Artistic Achievement, Canada's highest honour in the performing arts, for her work in theatre. She has also received the Gascon-Thomas Award from the National Theatre School of Canada and a Gemini Award.

== Filmography ==
=== Film ===
Year	Title	Role	Notes
1972	Mahoney's Estate	Joy	
1978	The Third Walker	The Nun	
1982	Jen's Place	Jennifer's Mother	
1992	Oh, What a Night	Dora / Donald's mother	
2012	The Samaritan	Celia	
2014	Wet Bum	Judith	

=== Television ===
Year	Title	Role	Notes
1962	Playdate	Elfie	Episode: "The Broken Sky"
1963	Festival	Hedvig Ekdal	Episode: "The Wild Duck"
1966	Henry V	Princess	Television film
1971–1974	Dr. Simon Locke	Various roles	4 episodes
1973	Lighten My Darkness		
1974–1976	Swiss Family Robinson	Elizabeth Robinson	26 episodes
1981	The Great Detective	Veronica Batcherly	2 episodes
1989	Friday the 13th: The Series	Judith Horn	Episode: "Crippled Inside"
1993	Bonds of Love	Psychologist	Television film
1993	North of 60	Sister Simone	Episode: "Sisters of Mercy"
1994	Madonna: Innocence Lost	Ruth Novak	Television film
1995	Lady Killer	Dr. Sachs	Television film
1997	The Adventures of Shirley Holmes	Rebecca Ratcliff	Episode: "The Case of the Second Sight"
1998	More Tales of the City	Frannie Halcyon	6 episodes
2001	Further Tales of the City	Frannie Halcyon	3 episodes
2001	The Pretender: Island of the Haunted	Ocee	Television film
2004	Snakes & Ladders	Tamlyn Barnes	Episode: "Squattergate"
2005	Trudeau II: Maverick in the Making	Grace Elliott Trudeau	Television film
2005, 2006	This Is Wonderland	Joan Demchek	2 episodes
2008	Of Murder and Memory	Grace	Television film
2009	The Good Times Are Killing Me	Celia Derby	Television film
2010	Living in Your Car	Judge Puddicombe	5 episodes
2014	Murdoch Mysteries	Caroline Hill	Episode: "The Death of Dr. Ogden"
2015	Remedy	Marielle Kavanaugh	Episode: "Fight or Flight"
2016	Kim's Convenience	Mary	3 episodes
2017	Private Eyes	Martha Caspary	Episode: "Now You See Her"
2021	SurrealEstate	Sister Mary Ellen	Episode: "Ft. Ghost Child"
