= Fumio Yoshimura =

Japanese and American sculptor (1926–2002)

- 吉村 二三夫
- Born: 1926; Japan
- Died: July 23, 2002 (aged 75–76); New York City, U.S.
- Education: Tokyo University of the Arts
- Occupation: Sculptor
- Spouses: Yoshiko Yoshimura; Kate Millett (m. 1965; div. 1985); Carol Yoshimura

Fumio Yoshimura (Japanese: 吉村 二三夫, Hepburn: Yoshimura Fumio; 1926 – July 23, 2002) was a Japanese and American sculptor. He was known for his wooden replicas of everyday objects such as plants and machines.

== Life and work ==
Fumio Yoshimura studied painting at Tokyo University of the Arts, graduating in 1949. He came to Manhattan in the early 1960s. He was married to Kate Millett, who dedicated her book Sexual Politics to him. In 1985, the couple divorced.

In New York he taught himself to work wood with various knives, chisels and drills and developed a virtuoso technique. He started with forms of plants and vegetables. He used white unpainted basswood, which gave a ghostly pallor to his sculptures of everyday objects such as typewriters, sewing machines, bicycles, or a hot-dog stand. His style is often associated with hyperrealism, but he has described his works as embodying the "ghost" of objects. Objects used for human activity were often the subject of his art, but he never depicted humans. "Three Bicycles" was the central work in an exhibition at the Museum of Arts and Design (MAD) in New York City in 1986.

In 1981 Yoshimura was artist in residence at the Hood Museum of Art at Dartmouth College, where he then taught sculpture as an adjunct professor until 1993. Works by Fumio Yoshimura are in the collections of the Philadelphia Museum of Art, the Pennsylvania Academy of the Fine Arts, and the Hood Museum.

== Works ==
=== Exhibit guides ===
- Yoshimura, Fumio (1979). Sculptures and Drawings by Fumio Yoshimura: March 29 to April 29, 1979. United States: Mead Art Museum, Amherst College.
- Yoshimura, Fumio (1984). Fumio Yoshimura: Spirits. United States: Mitchell Museum.
- Courtney, J.; Yoshimura, F. (1987). Fumio Yoshimura: December 4, 1987-January 23, 1988. United States: Temple Gallery.
- Yoshimura, Fumio (1993). Fumio Yoshimura: Harvest of a Quiet Eye. United States: Hood Museum of Art, Dartmouth College.
