= Acid attacks on women in Isfahan =

2014 attacks on women in Isfahan, Iran

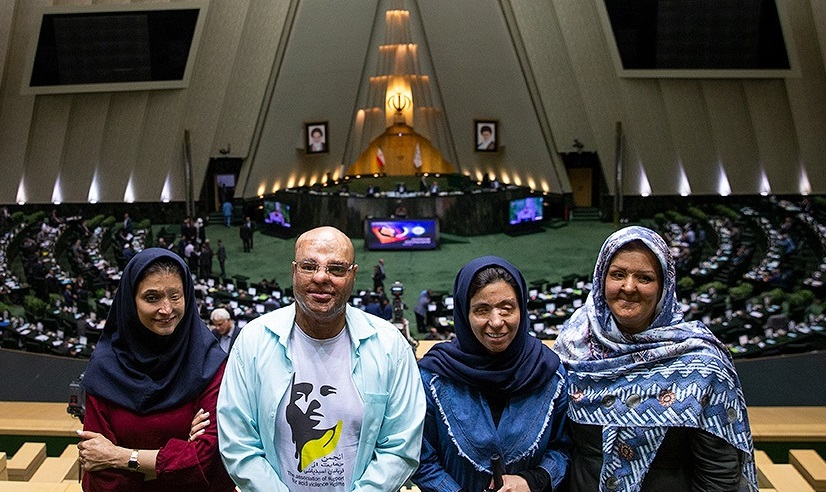
Attack victims in Iran’s Parliament

A series of acid attacks on women in the Iranian city of Isfahan, starting sometime around October 2014, raised fears and prompted reports that the victims were targeted for not being properly veiled. As of October 27, 2014, at least twenty-five such attacks had occurred in Isfahan. At least one woman died and many more received severe burns to their faces and hands. Following public outrage over the attacks, the Iranian Parliament passed a law in 2019 that provided broader legal protection to survivors and increased the prison term for perpetrators of acid attacks.

The attacks were reportedly carried out by 2 unknown assailants riding together on the same motorbike. They wore helmets with visors down to hide their faces and flung acid into the faces of women who were walking or driving automobiles. None of the perpetrators were found, and as a result the victims were given blood money (“Diyah” in Farsi) from the government.

== Known victims ==
There are four named victims from the 2014 acid attacks in Isfahan.

Neda M was a young woman in Isfahan who was reportedly driving to take clothes to a friend who needed them. She pulled over to answer a call from her mother when the acid was thrown at her through the car window. She lost her sight completely in one eye and only had 30% of her sight remaining in the other eye.

Maryam (no last name given) thought herself to be one of the early victims. She was a mother and student at the university who had gone shopping for her son’s upcoming birthday. She stated “A rider threw nearly two liters of acid through the car driver’s window towards me, which affected my face, hands and my body.”

Marziyeh Ebrahimi turned to politics and activism following the acid attack against her in Isfahan in 2014. She was featured as one of the strongest activists for Iran government passing a law against acid attacks in January 2019. She has publicly exhibited photographs of her scars.

Sohelia Jorkesh lost her right eye to the acid attack and has been working with medical teams in Iran and the United States to try and preserve what sight she has left in her left eye. Jorkesh has been outspoken regarding her discontent with the government of Iran, including how they failed to find the culprits behind the attacks and how they have not paid her the full amount necessary for the blood money.

== Motivation ==
While many Iranians believed the attackers were conservative Islamist vigilantes trying to intimidate women into wearing (what the vigilantes deemed) modest dress, Iranian officials denied this. The authorities were said to be "particularly angry with any suggestion that attackers were driven by religious extremism, or that victims were targeted because they wore clothing that could be deemed inappropriate in the eyes of hardliners". One "semi-official" plainclothes group, Ansar-e Hezbollah, which has conducted 'morality patrols' to enforce Islamic dress in the past, blamed "the enemy" attempting to "strike a blow against security," for the acid attacks.

Iranian liberals believed the attacks were connected to a parliamentary measure passed October 19, 2014, that “enjoined good and forbade wrong” by providing protection for vigilantes patrolling the streets and helping enforce the country’s strict social mores on public dress or behavior. According to Hadi Ghaemi, the executive director of the International Campaign for Human Rights in Iran, the attacks came "in the midst of a year-long verbal attack by conservative forces in Iran attacking women for their clothes,” giving “verbal warnings and calls that blood must be shed. These are not isolated incidents.”

== Reactions ==
=== Arrests ===
Iranian authorities arrested four people suspected of throwing acid on women, according to a report by the official IRNA news agency. But Interior Minister Abdolreza Rahmani Fazli stated that authorities don’t have sufficient evidence to charge any of the suspects in connection to the attacks. As of 2018, no one had been charged in the attacks. As a result, the government has paid blood money to the victims.

=== Protests ===
Protest rallies to denounce the attacks were held in Isfahan and the capital Tehran. Mindful of past crackdowns, however, the demonstrators generally dispersed quickly when confronted by police. On October 27, hundreds of Iranian security forces thwarted a planned protest in Tehran to demand tougher government action against the attacks.

=== Government anger at media reports ===
Four journalists and a photographer from the Islamic Students' News Agency were arrested after their organization covered the attacks, according to Al-Monitor. The four journalists were released within a day, while photographer Arya Jafari remained in custody. One hundred and twenty-nine Iranian journalists signed a letter of protest on October 30, and Jafari was released on bail on October 31, nine days after his arrest.

Interior Minister Fazli declared in late October that “Foreign media are exaggerating about the acid attacks.” On October 28, the chief of staff of the Iranian armed forces, Hassan Firouzabadi, said the impact of some media reports was “worse than acid attacks”. Iran’s prosecutor general, Ibrahim Raeesi, has denied that the acid attacks were linked in any way to the state’s policing of morality.

According to Jason Stern of the Committee to Protect Journalists, “this case deals with everything Iranian hardliners can’t stand: critical media coverage, street protests, women’s rights and government accountability.”

== See also ==
- Human rights in Iran
