= The Intruder (1981 film) =

The Intruder is a film released in 1981.

== Plot summary ==
The Intruder is a film in which a stranger with a coffin comes to a small Canadian town to put on a show.

== Reception ==
Colin Greenland reviewed The Intruder for Imagine magazine, and stated that "Decorated with soap-opera sex and squabbles, and burdened with dialogue of supernatural stupidity, The Intruder fails to thrill."
