= Sexual Politics =

1970 book by Kate Millett

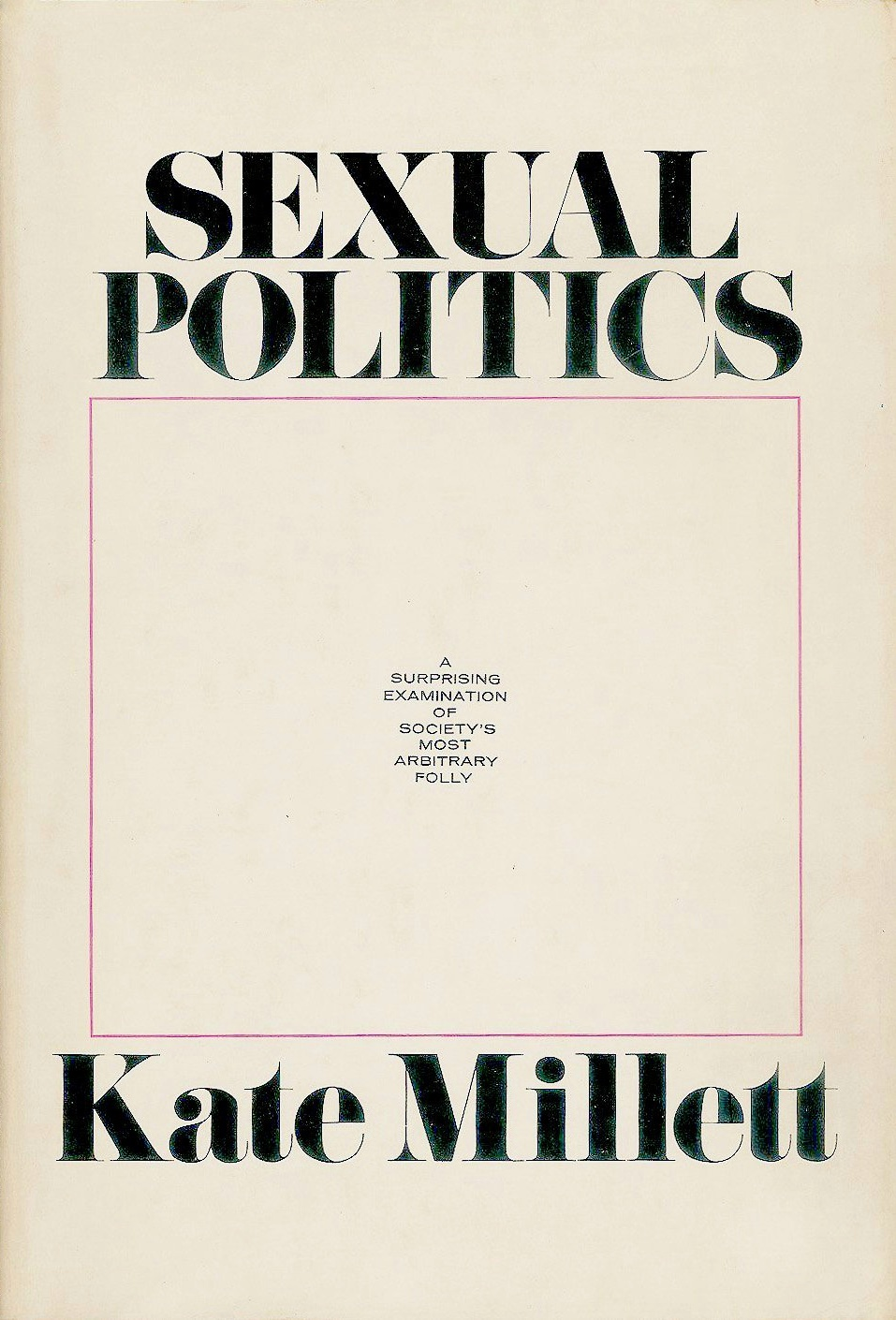
- Cover of the first edition
- Author: Kate Millett
- Language: English
- Subjects: Sexism
- Publisher: Doubleday
- Publication date: 1970
- Publication place: United States
- Media type: Print (hardcover and paperback)
- Pages: 393
- ISBN: 0-385-05292-8
- OCLC: 88446

Sexual Politics is the debut book by American writer and activist Kate Millett, based on her PhD dissertation at Columbia University. It was published in 1970 by Doubleday. It is regarded as a classic of feminism and one of radical feminism's key texts, a formative piece in shaping the intentions of the second-wave feminist movement. In Sexual Politics, an explicit focus is placed on male dominance throughout prominent 20th century art and literature. According to Millett, Western literature reflects patriarchal constructions and the heteronormativity of society. She argues that men have established power over women, but that this power is the result of social constructs rather than innate or biological qualities.

== Summary ==
The book begins by quoting Henry Miller and Norman Mailer. Millett examines sex scenes by both authors in which a male main character seduces a compliant woman who is insatiably hungry for sex, then humiliates, beats, sexually assaults, or murders the women.

Millett argues that the scenes have political undertones. By punishing women for their sexuality the male characters enforce the rules of patriarchy, which Millett defines as "the birthright priority whereby males rule females." She feels these male characters are stand-ins for the authors themselves, whom she feels are mired in violent sexual myths designed to maintain men as a ruling class. In contrast, she applauds the writer Jean Genet for writing queer sex scenes that critically examine these myths. Genet's work points to the "sick delirium of power and violence" that must be analyzed if society is to achieve sexual liberation.

These literary scenes serves as examples of what Millett names "sexual politics." She clarifies that she does not mean politics in the narrow sense of political parties and elections. Instead, politics describes any situation in which one group of people has power over another.

Millett points to her observation that the military, the police, political offices, science fields, etc., are populated almost exclusively by men. Even the concept of God is typically portrayed as male. Because men hold all these positions of power, they dominate the relationship between the sexes; women are subordinate. Men are rewarded in life for adopting an attitude of dominance, whereas women are encouraged to be passive and ignorant. This training makes patriarchy appear natural, as though it were determined by biology, when in fact it is a social convention or a political relationship.

The rest of the book is largely her literary reflections of different authors and books, including Lady Chatterley's Lover and others.

=== Central claims ===
Millett makes the claim that romantic love disguises the mismatch in power between men and women, but it leaves women vulnerable to emotional exploitation. As evidence, she points to the fact that women tend to have less economic power than men, and make less income. Millett says we don't often consider the ways that outright force is used to uphold patriarchy, yet this is the purpose of sexual violence, which is common.

Millett often critiques the sexual revolution of the 1960s, arguing that it did not bring about true liberation for women as intended. She explores how traditional gender roles persisted despite changes in sexual behavior and norms. She later delves into the history and politics of sexuality, which is where she discusses how sexual pleasure has been defined and controlled throughout history by men and their expectations for women.

She discusses the social construction of femininity and critiques how women's bodies have been objectified and commodified. She discusses the impact of societal expectations on women's self-perception and relationships and examines how, due to the socialization of children, gender roles are often ingrained from an early age. She discusses the ways in which societal expectations shape children's understanding of gender and sexuality. She touches upon and analyzes Freudian ideas to explain her points, and goes on to offer new interpretations of them.

== Influences ==
Sexual Politics was largely influenced by Simone de Beauvoir's 1949 book The Second Sex.

== Reception ==
Sexual Politics has been seen as a classic feminist text, said to be "the first book of academic feminist literary criticism", and "one of the first feminist books of this decade to raise nationwide male ire", though like Betty Friedan's The Feminine Mystique (1963) and Germaine Greer's The Female Eunuch (1970), its status has declined. Sexual Politics was an important theoretical touchstone for the second wave feminism of the 1970s. It was also extremely controversial. Norman Mailer, whose work, especially his novel An American Dream (1965), had been criticised by Millett, wrote the article "The Prisoner of Sex" in Harper's Magazine in response, attacking Millett's claims and defending Miller and Lawrence, and later extensively attacked her writings in his non-fiction book of the same name.

The psychoanalyst Juliet Mitchell argues that Millett, like many other feminists, misreads Freud and misunderstands the implications of psychoanalytic theory for feminism. Christina Hoff Sommers writes that, by teaching women that politics is "essentially sexual" and that "even the so-called democracies" are "male hegemonies", Sexual Politics helped to move feminism in a different direction, toward an ideology that Sommers calls "gender feminism". The author Richard Webster writes that Millett's "analysis of the reactionary character of psychoanalysis" was inspired by the philosopher Simone de Beauvoir's The Second Sex (1949). The critic Camille Paglia called Sexual Politics an "atrocious book", which "reduced complex artworks to their political content". She accused it of spawning what she sees as the excesses of women's studies departments, especially for attacks on the alleged pervasive sexism of the male authors of the Western canon.

The historian Arthur Marwick described Sexual Politics as, alongside Shulamith Firestone's The Dialectic of Sex (1970), one of the two key texts of radical feminism. Doubleday's trade division, although it declined to reprint it when it went out of print briefly, said Sexual Politics was one of the ten most important books that it had published in its hundred years of existence and included it in its anniversary anthology.

The New York Times published a review of the book in 1970 that predicted it would become "the Bible of Women's Liberation." The article was written by Marcia Seligson and praised the book as "a piece of passionate thinking on a life-and-death aspect of our public and private lives."

== Editions (incomplete list) ==
- Kate Millett, Sexual Politics (Garden City, New York: Doubleday, 1970)
- Kate Millett, "Sexual Politics" (New York: Avon Discus (trade paperback reprint), 1971
- Kate Millett, Sexual Politics (London: Rupert Hart-Davis Ltd., 1971)
- Kate Millett, Sexual Politics (London: Virago, 1977)
- Kate Millett, Sexual Politics (Urbana: University of Illinois Press, 2000)
- Kate Millett, Sexual Politics (New York: Columbia University Press, 2016)
