= Alice Winchester =

American art historian

Alice Winchester (December 9, 1907 – December 9, 1996) was an American magazine editor and art historian.

== Biography ==
Born in Chicago, Winchester was the daughter of a Congregationalist clergyman. She grew up in Concord, Massachusetts, and received her bachelor's degree from Smith College. Upon graduation she worked briefly at Chase National Bank in New York City before joining the staff of Antiques, where in 1930 she became secretary to Homer Eaton Keyes. He died in October 1938; the following March Winchester was named his successor as editor.

Winchester became an influential voice in the world of antique collecting, publishing scholarship by such historians and curators as Joseph Downs, Charles F. Montgomery, Marshall B. Davison, Irving W. Lyon, and Helen Comstock. In the field of folk art, she published work by Mabel M. Swan, Esther Stevens Brazer, E. Alfred Jones, Carl W. Dreppard, Jean Lipman, and Nina Fletcher Little, among others. She devoted entire issues of the magazine to the Winterthur Museum, Colonial Williamsburg, the Shelburne Museum, Greenfield Village, the Henry Ford Museum, Historic Deerfield, and the Shaker museums at Hancock, Massachusetts and Pleasant Hill, Kentucky. Antiques also profiled notable collectors and their homes in the "Living With Antiques" feature. Upon her retirement in 1972, Winchester continued to publish on the subject of American folk art, writing about Jonathan Fisher and publishing two books with Jean Lipman. She also worked at the Whitney Museum of American Art from 1972 until 1974.

== Awards and honors ==
During her career she received the Smith College Medal in 1968 and the Henry Francis du Pont Award for the Decorative Arts from the Winterthur Museum in 1990.

== Legacy ==
An oral history interview with Winchester, conducted between 1993 and 1995, is held by the Archives of American Art at the Smithsonian Institution. The archives also own a collection of her papers, donated in 1993.
