= Morrison Heckscher =

American art historian and curator (born 1940)

- Born: Morrison Harris Heckscher; December 12, 1940 (age 85); Pennsylvania, US
- Other name: Morrison H. Heckscher
- Education: Wesleyan University (BA 1962); University of Delaware (MA 1966); Columbia University (PhD 1986)
- Occupations: Curator, art historian
- Employer: Metropolitan Museum of Art

Morrison Harris Heckscher (born December 12, 1940) is an American retired curator and art historian who served as the Lawrence A. Fleischman Chair of the American Wing at the Metropolitan Museum of Art from 2001 to 2014. He had worked in various curatorial roles at the Met since 1966. As chair, he oversaw a complete renovation of the interior and exhibits. He is a recipient of the Antique Dealers' Association Award of Merit and the Winterthur Museum's Henry Francis du Pont Award.

== Early life and education ==
Heckscher was born and raised west of Philadelphia and educated at the Episcopal Academy. His grandfather, Morris Harris, made furniture as a hobby and inspired his grandson's youthful dream of moving to rural Vermont to become a cabinetmaker. Heckscher received his BA degree in American history from Wesleyan University in 1962, his MA from the Winterthur Program in Early American Culture at the University of Delaware in 1964, and his PhD in art history from Columbia University (ABD 1968; PhD 1986). His dissertation focused on English architect and interior designer William Kent. Mentors included Samuel M. Green at Wesleyan, Charles F. Montgomery at Winterthur, and Rudolf Wittkower at Columbia. He developed special interests in 18th-century American furniture and 19th- and 20th-century American architecture.

== Career at the Met ==
Heckscher arrived at the Metropolitan Museum of Art in 1966 under a Chester Dale Fellowship to work with English architectural drawings in the prints department. His career in the American Wing began in 1968, when he became assistant curator of American decorative arts. He put his dissertation on hold to accept the full-time role and ultimately received his PhD in 1986. He gained promotions to Curator of American Decorative Arts in 1978, to Anthony W. and Lulu C. Wang Curator of American Decorative Arts in 1998, and to Lawrence A. Fleischman Chair of the American Wing at the Metropolitan Museum of Art in 2001. As chair, he envisioned and oversaw the decade-long renovation and reinstallation of the entire American Wing, culminating in galleries of American paintings and sculpture that opened to acclaim in 2012. Heckscher retired in 2014 and now serves as curator emeritus of the American Wing. Sylvia Yount, former chief curator at the Virginia Museum of Fine Arts, succeeded him as chair.

== Scholarly contributions ==
Heckscher mounted numerous Met exhibitions with accompanying catalogs: In Quest of Comfort: The Easy Chair in America (1971), An Architect and His Client: Frank Lloyd Wright and Francis W. Little (1973), The Architecture of Richard Morris Hunt (1986), American Rococo: Elegance in Ornament, 1750–1775 (with Leslie Greene Bowman, 1992), American Furniture and the Art of Connoisseurship (1998); John Townsend: Newport Cabinetmaker (2005); The Metropolitan Museum of Art: An Architectural History, 1870–1995 (1995); and Creating Central Park (2008). His monograph American Furniture in The Metropolitan Museum of Art: The Late Colonial Period, Vol. II: Queen Anne and Chippendale Styles (1985) won the Charles F. Montgomery Award of the Decorative Arts Society. Heckscher has served in leadership roles at the New York Chapter of the Society of Architectural Historians, the Society of Winterthur Fellows, the Winterthur Museum, Locust Grove Estate, Scenic Hudson, and Strawbery Banke.

== Awards ==
- Eric M. Wunsch Award for Excellence in the American Arts (Wunsch Americana Foundation, 2016)
- Henry Francis du Pont Award (Winterthur Museum, Garden and Library, 2016)
- Iris Foundation Award for Outstanding Achievement in Scholarship (Bard Graduate Center, 2013)
- Frederic E. Church Award (Olana Partnership, 2012)
- Lawrence A. Fleischman Award for Scholarly Excellence in the Field of American Art History from the Smithsonian Institution's Archives of American Art (2012)
- Award of Merit from the Antique Dealers' Association (2011)
- Charles F. Montgomery Award from the Decorative Arts Society (1986)

== Personal life ==
Heckscher married Fenella Greig in 1974. She is a British-born retired pediatric endocrinologist who attended the University of Oxford. The couple owns a rustic summer home on Louds Island in Maine and a Gothic Revival house near Newburgh in upstate New York, in addition to an apartment on the West Side of Manhattan.
