= Florence M. Montgomery =

American museologist, art historian, and curator (1914–1998)

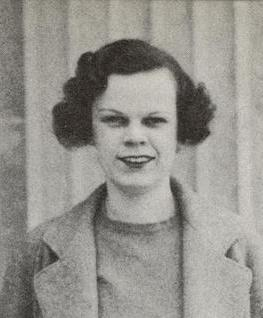
- Montgomery in 1936
- Born: Florence Elizabeth Mellowes; July 22, 1914; Fort Wayne, Indiana, US
- Died: January 20, 1998 (aged 83); Hamden, Connecticut, US
- Education: University of Wisconsin–Madison (BA), Radcliffe College (MFA)
- Occupations: Museologist, art historian, curator
- Employer: Winterthur Museum
- Spouse: Charles F. Montgomery

Florence Mellowes Montgomery (July 22, 1914 – January 20, 1998) was an American museologist, art historian, and curator, specializing in textiles. She authored two influential books and worked as a curator at Winterthur Museum, Garden and Library. She was married to Charles F. Montgomery, a fellow curator and art historian who was Winterthur Museum's first director.

== Life and career ==
Born Florence Elizabeth Mellowes in Fort Wayne, Indiana, she earned her BA in art history from the University of Wisconsin–Madison in 1936. She traveled and studied in Europe and worked as a library secretary at the Art Institute of Chicago before receiving an MFA from Radcliffe College in 1943. She also completed the Fogg Art Museum course at Harvard University. She went on to become an assistant to the director of the Rhode Island School of Design Museum. She subsequently moved to New York to work at the Metropolitan Museum of Art with Joseph Downs, curator of the American Wing.

In 1946, she married Charles F. Montgomery (1910–1978), with whom she had two children: William Phelps, who went on to become a digital fine artist, and Agnes Nisbet, who died at the age of five. She and her husband moved to Delaware in 1949 and to Connecticut in 1970. When Yale University published a posthumous tribute to Charles's career (originally intended to celebrate his retirement), the volume underscored the professional contributions of his wife and collaborator.

At the Winterthur Museum in Delaware, where her husband became the museum's inaugural director in 1954, Montgomery organized the training of the museum's docents. She also taught art history in the influential Winterthur Program in Early American Culture. For ten years, she served as the assistant curator of textiles at the museum.

Montgomery continued to write, teach, volunteer, and work as a museum consultant until her death. Her first book, Printed Textiles: English and American Cottons and Linens 1700–1850 (Viking, 1970), remains a "standard reference in the field." The publication of her monumental historical dictionary of fabrics, Textiles in America 1650–1870 (Norton, 1984), was an "event much anticipated" by scholars. Both continue to appear on syllabi for courses in material culture and the decorative arts.

Montgomery died in Hamden, Connecticut, at the age of 83. Her papers are held in the archives of the Winterthur Library.
