= Leslie Bowman =

Leslie Bowman may refer to:

- Leslie W. Bowman (born 1949), American painter and illustrator
- Leslie Greene Bowman (born 1956), American museum administrator and decorative arts historian
