= Paris green =

Highly toxic arsenic-based pigment

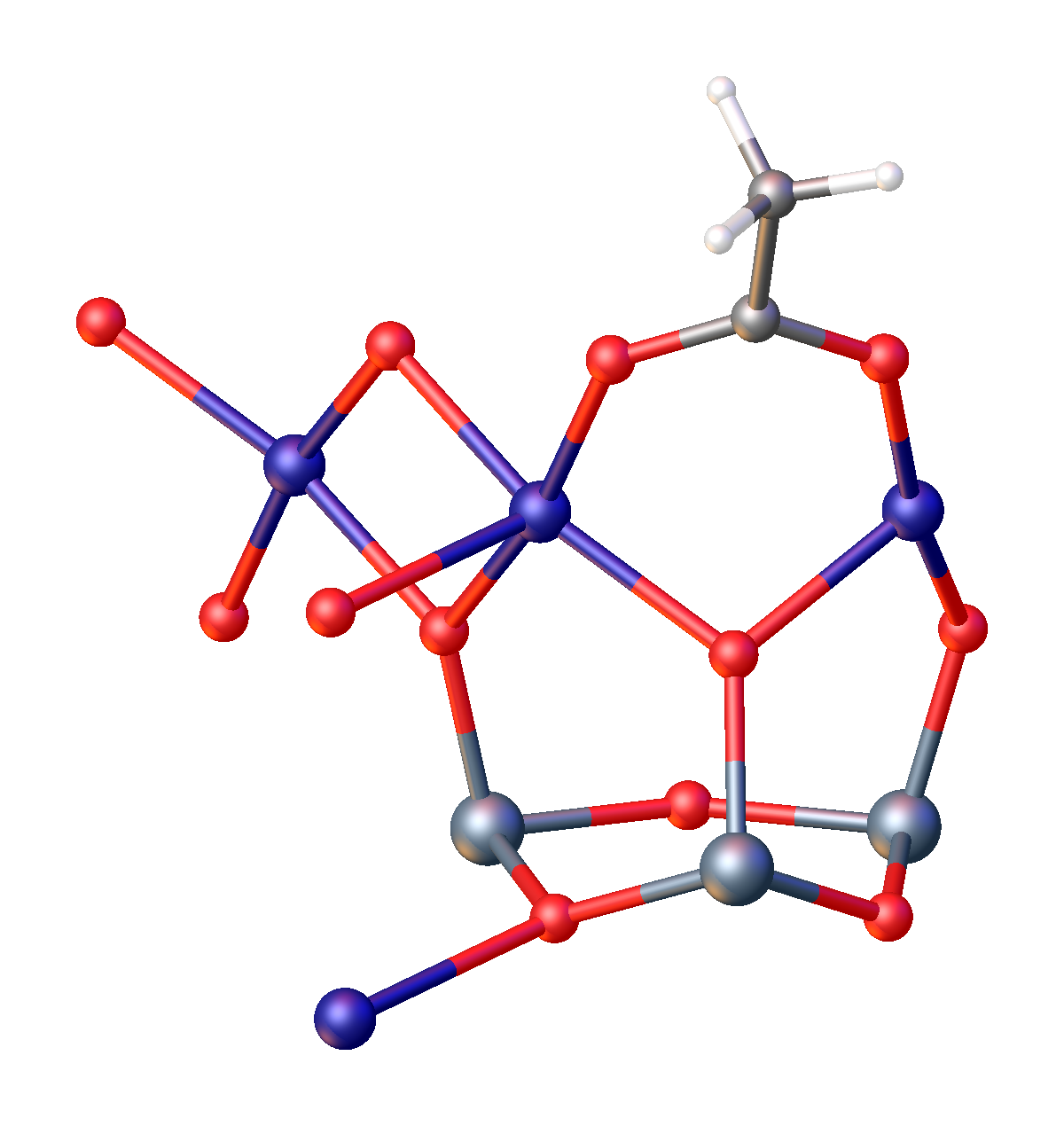
- A subunit of the Cu(C_{2}H_{3}O_{2})_{2}·3Cu(AsO_{2})_{2} framework, highlighting the As_{3}O^{3−}_{6} ligand. Color code: Cu = blue, As = large gray, C = gray, O = red.

Names
- Other names: Copper(II) acetate triarsenite; C.I. pigment green 21; Emerald green; Imperial green; Mitis green; Schweinfurt green; Veronese green; Vienna green

Identifiers
CAS Number	12002-03-8
3D model (JSmol)	Interactive image; Interactive image
ChemSpider	17215797
ECHA InfoCard	100.125.242
EC Number	601-658-7
PubChem CID	22833492
UNII	X4916E1P1M
UN number	1585
CompTox Dashboard (EPA)	DTXSID0024846
- InChI: InChI=1S/2C2H4O2.6AsHO2.4Cu/c2*1-2(3)4;6*2-1-3;;;;/h2*1H3,(H,3,4);6*(H,2,3);;;;/q;;;;;;;;4*+2/p-8 Key: HTSABAUNNZLCMN-UHFFFAOYSA-F
- SMILES: CC(=O)[O-].CC(=O)[O-].[O-][As]=O.[O-][As]=O.[O-][As]=O.[O-][As]=O.[O-][As]=O.[O-][As]=O.[Cu+2].[Cu+2].[Cu+2].[Cu+2]; CC(=O)[O-].CC(=O)[O-].[O-][As]0O[As]([O-])O[As]([O-])O0.[O-][As]0O[As]([O-])O[As]([O-])O0.[Cu+2].[Cu+2].[Cu+2].[Cu+2]

Properties
Chemical formula	Cu(C_{2}H_{3}O_{2})_{2}·3Cu(AsO_{2})_{2}
Molar mass	1013.790 g·mol^{−1}
Appearance	Emerald green crystalline powder
Density	>1.1 g/cm^{3} (20 °C (68 °F; 293 K))
Melting point	> 345 °C (653 °F; 618 K)
Boiling point	decomposes
Solubility in water	insoluble

Structure
Space group	P2_{1}/m–C_{2h}^{2}
Lattice constant	a = 9.93 Å, b = 9.40 Å, c = 5.48 Å α = 90°, β = 102.0°, γ = 90°
Formula units (Z)	2
Coordination geometry	Tetragonal at Cu.

Hazards
- GHS labelling
Pictograms	(GHS06: Toxic) (GHS09: Environmental hazard)
Signal word	Danger
Hazard statements	H300, H313, H331, H411
Precautionary statements	P261, P264, P273, P280, P301+P310, P304+P340
NFPA 704 (fire diamond)	4 1 0
- Lethal dose or concentration (LD, LC)
LD_{50} (median dose)	22 mg/kg
- NIOSH (US health exposure limits)
PEL (Permissible)	TWA 0.01 mg/m^{3} (as As)
REL (Recommended)	0.002 mg/m^{3} (15-minute, as As)
IDLH (Immediate danger)	5 mg/m^{3} (as As)
Safety data sheet (SDS)	Toronto Research Chemicals SDS
- Except where otherwise noted, data are given for materials in their standard state (at 25 °C [77 °F], 100 kPa). verify (what is ?) Infobox references

Paris green

Color coordinates
- Hex triplet: #50C878
- sRGB^{B} (r, g, b): (80, 200, 120)
- HSV (h, s, v): (140°, 60%, 78%)
- CIELCh_{uv} (L, C, h): (72, 71, 137°)
- Source: Maerz and Paul (Note: The color displayed in the color box above matches the color called emerald green in the 1930 book by Maerz and Paul A Dictionary of Color New York: 1930 McGraw-Hill; the color emerald green is displayed on page 75, Plate 26, Color Sample J10.)
- ISCC–NBS descriptor: Vivid yellowish green
- B: Normalized to [0–255] (byte)

Paris green (copper(II) acetate triarsenite or copper(II) acetoarsenite) is an arsenic- and copper-containing pigment. It is an emerald-green crystalline powder that is also known as Mitis green, Schweinfurt green, Sattler green, emerald green, Vienna green, emperor green or mountain green. It is highly toxic and has thus also been used as a rodenticide and insecticide. Its formula is Cu(C_{2}H_{3}O_{2})_{2}·3Cu(AsO_{2})_{2}.

It was invented in 1814 to be a pigment to make a vibrant green paint, and was used by many notable painters in the 19th century. The color of Paris green is said to range from a pale blue-green when very finely ground to a deeper green when coarsely ground. Due to the presence of arsenic, the pigment is extremely toxic. In paintings, the color can degrade quickly.

== Preparation and structure ==
Paris green may be prepared by combining copper(II) acetate and arsenic trioxide. The structure was confirmed by X-ray crystallography.

== History ==
In 1814, Paris green was invented by paint manufacturers Wilhelm Sattler and Friedrich Russ, in Schweinfurt, Germany for the Wilhelm Dye and White Lead Company. They were attempting to produce a more stable pigment than Scheele's green, seeking to make a green that was less susceptible to darkening around sulfides. In 1822, the recipe for emerald green was published by Justus von Liebig and André Braconnot.

In 1867, the pigment was named Paris green and was officially recognized as the first chemical insecticide in the world. Because of its arsenic content, the pigment was dangerous and toxic to manufacture, often resulting in factory poisonings. The production of Paris green exposed factory workers in pigment production facilities to hazardous airborne arsenic compounds, leading to frequent cases of both acute and chronic poisoning. Because the pigment was handled as a fine powder, workers were especially vulnerable to inhalation and long-term internal exposure. These health risks made Paris green one of the most dangerous industrial pigments of the era.

At the time, emerald green was praised as a more durable and vibrant substitute for Scheele's green, even though it would later prove to degrade quickly and react with other manufactured paints.

== Pigment ==
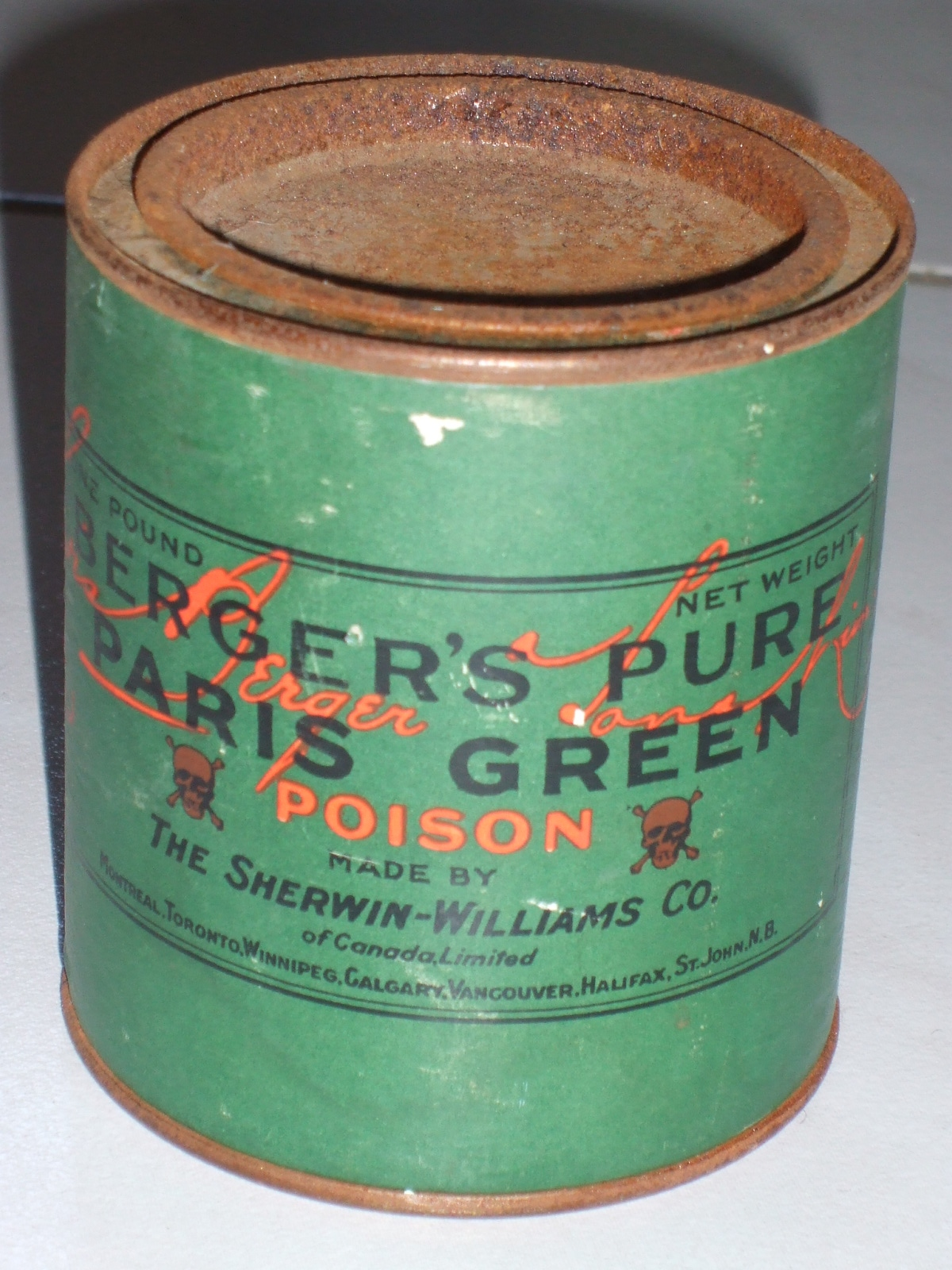
Can of Paris green pigment by Sherwin-Williams Co.

In paintings, the pigment produces a rich, dark green with an undertone of blue. In comparison, Scheele's green is more yellow, and therefore, more lime-green. Paris green became popular in the 19th century because of its brilliant color. It was also called emerald green because of its resemblance to the gemstone's deep color.

=== Permanence ===
The pigment has a tendency to darken and turn brown. The issue was already apparent in the 19th century. In a 1888 study, watercolors with the pigment were shown to darken and turn brown when exposed to natural light and air. Experiments at the turn of the 20th century gave mixed results. Some found that the Paris green degraded slightly while other sources said the pigment was weatherproof. This discrepancy could be due to the fact that each experiment used a different brand of Paris green.

Paris green in Descente des Vaches by Théodore Rousseau has changed significantly.

==== Related pigments ====
Similar natural compounds are the minerals chalcophyllite (Cu_{18}Al_{2}(AsO_{4})_{3}(SO_{4})_{3}(OH)_{27}·36H_{2}O), conichalcite (CaCu(AsO_{4})(OH)), cornubite (Cu_{5}(AsO_{4})_{2}(OH)_{4}·H_{2}O), cornwallite (Cu_{5}(AsO_{4})_{2}(OH)_{4}·H_{2}O), and liroconite (Cu_{2}Al(AsO_{4})(OH)_{4}·4H_{2}O). These minerals range in color from greenish blue to slightly yellowish green.

Scheele's green is a chemically simpler, less brilliant, and less permanent, copper-arsenic pigment used for a rather short time before Paris green was first prepared, which was approximately 1814. It was popular as a wallpaper pigment and would degrade, with moisture and molds, to arsine gas. Paris green was used in wallpaper to some extent and may have degraded similarly. Both pigments were once used in printing ink formulations.

The ancient Romans used one of them, possibly conichalcite, as a green pigment. Later, the chemical was produced with increasingly small grinds and without carefully removing impurities. Its permanence suffered. It is likely that it was ground more finely for use in watercolors and inks.

== Historical uses ==
=== Painting ===
Paris green was widely used by 19th-century artists. It is present in several paintings by Claude Monet and Paul Gauguin, who found its color difficult to replicate with natural materials.

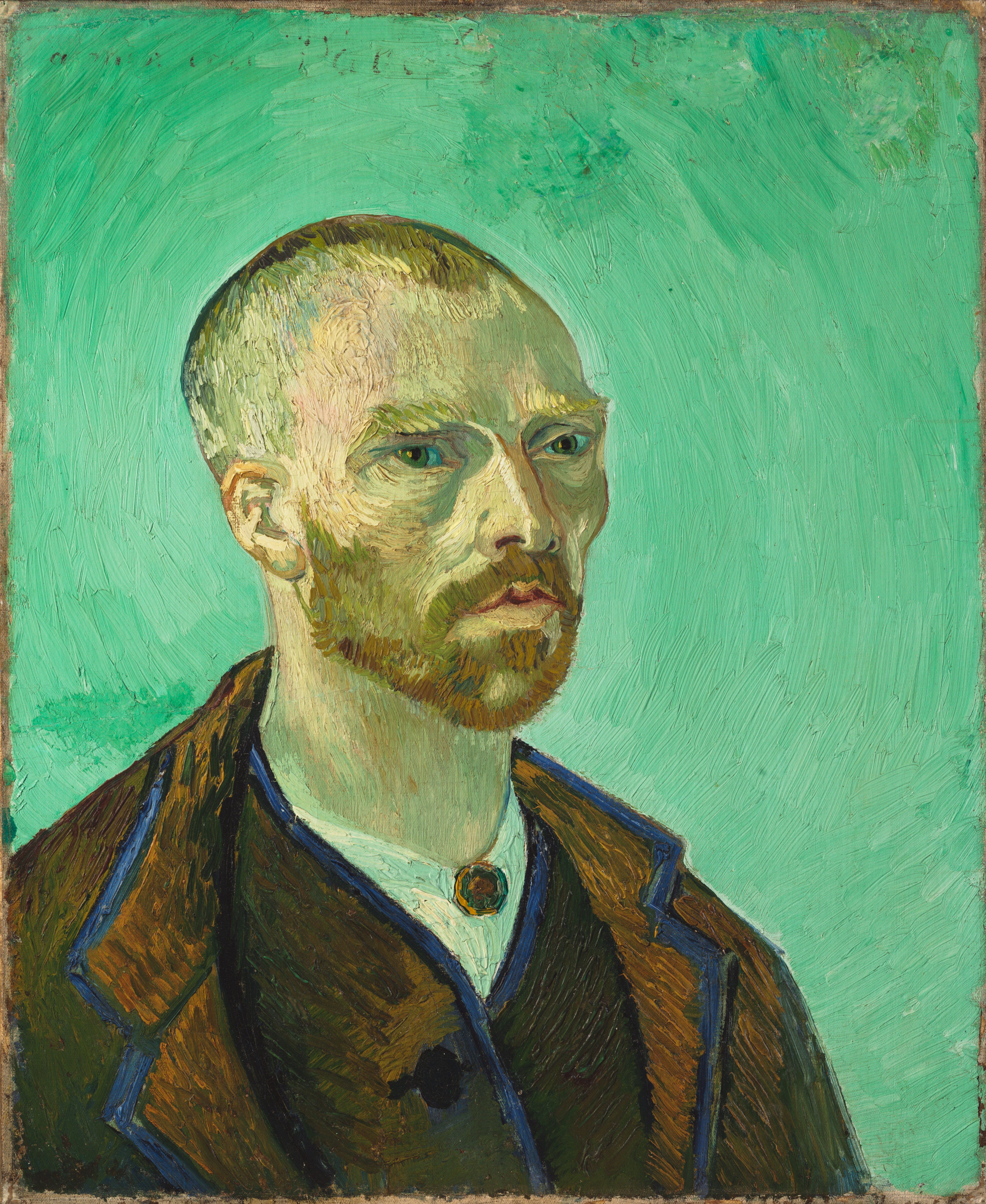
Vincent van Gogh, Self-Portrait (Dedicated to Paul Gauguin), September, 1888. Note the vivid background and undercoat of Paris green.

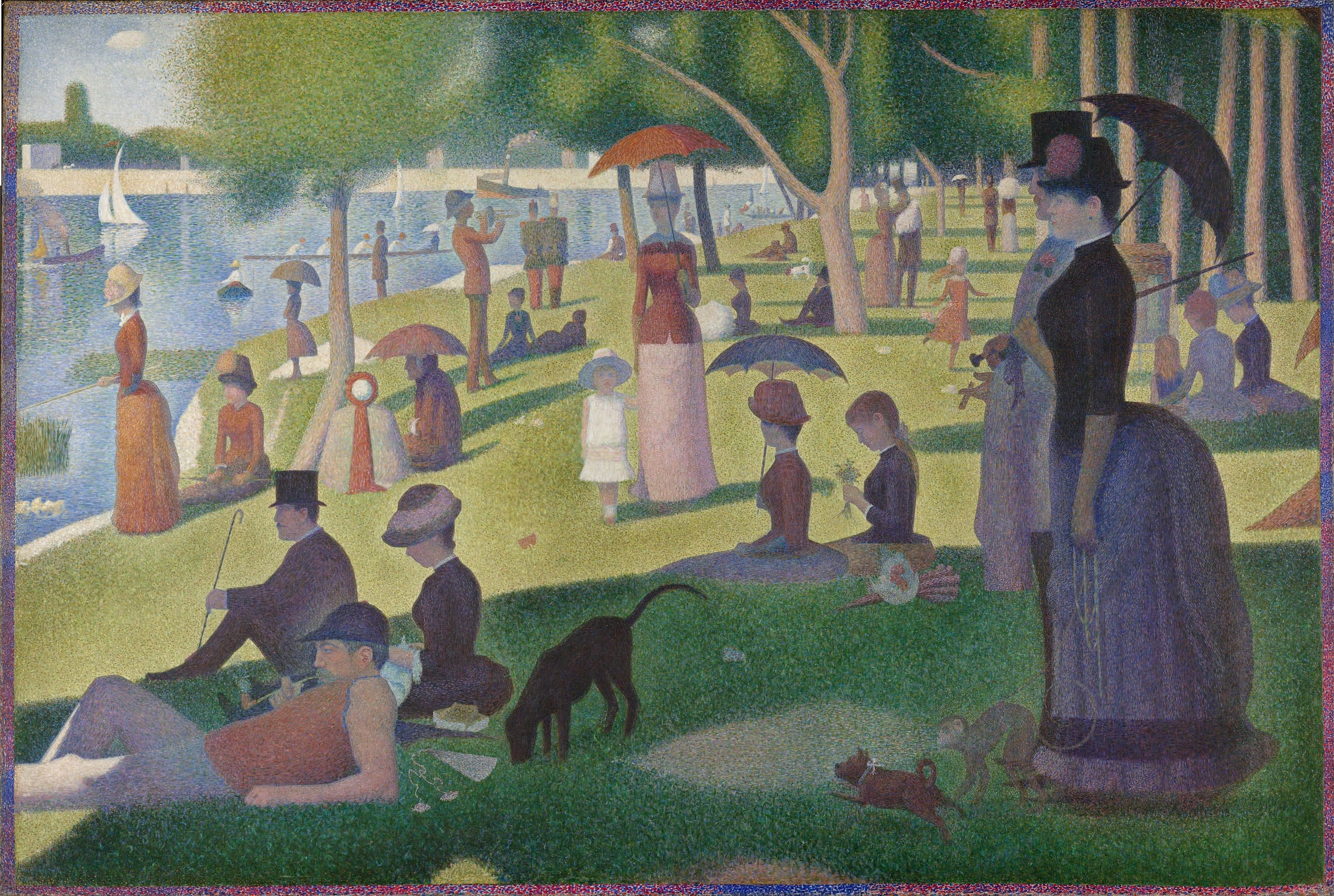
Georges Seurat, A Sunday on la Grande Jatte: an example of a neo-Impressionist work using emerald green

=== Insecticide ===
In 1867, farmers in Illinois and Indiana found that Paris green was effective against the Colorado potato beetle, an aggressive agricultural pest. Despite concerns regarding the safety of using arsenic compounds on food crops, Paris green became the preferred method for controlling the beetle. By the 1880s, Paris green had become the world's first widely used chemical insecticide. The widespread agricultural use of Paris green as an insecticide also contributed to long-term environmental contamination, as arsenic compounds accumulated in soil and water systems after repeated spraying on crops and orchards. The compound did not break down easily, allowing toxic residues to persist in treated environments. It was also used widely in the Americas to control the tobacco budworm, Heliothis virescens. To kill codling moth, it was mixed with lime and sprayed on fruit trees.

Paris green was heavily sprayed by airplane in Italy, Sardinia, and Corsica during 1944 and in Italy in 1945 to control malaria. It was once used to kill rats in Parisian sewers, which is how it acquired its common name.

However, the manufacturing of the insecticide caused many health complications for factory workers, and in certain cases was lethal.

Illustrations of Paris green
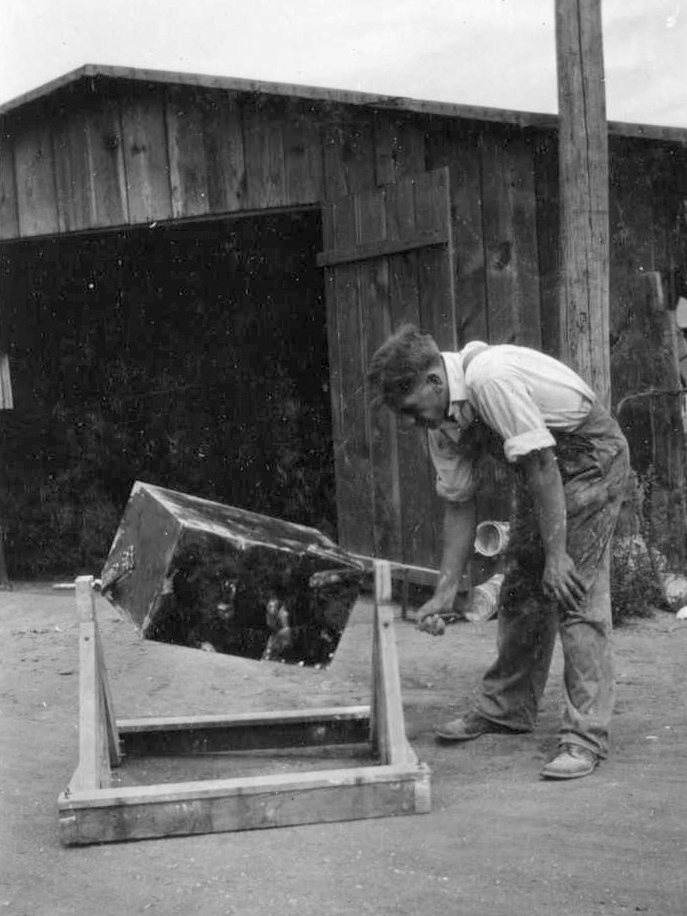
Mixing "Paris green" and road dust preparatory to dusting streams and breeding places of mosquitoes during World War II

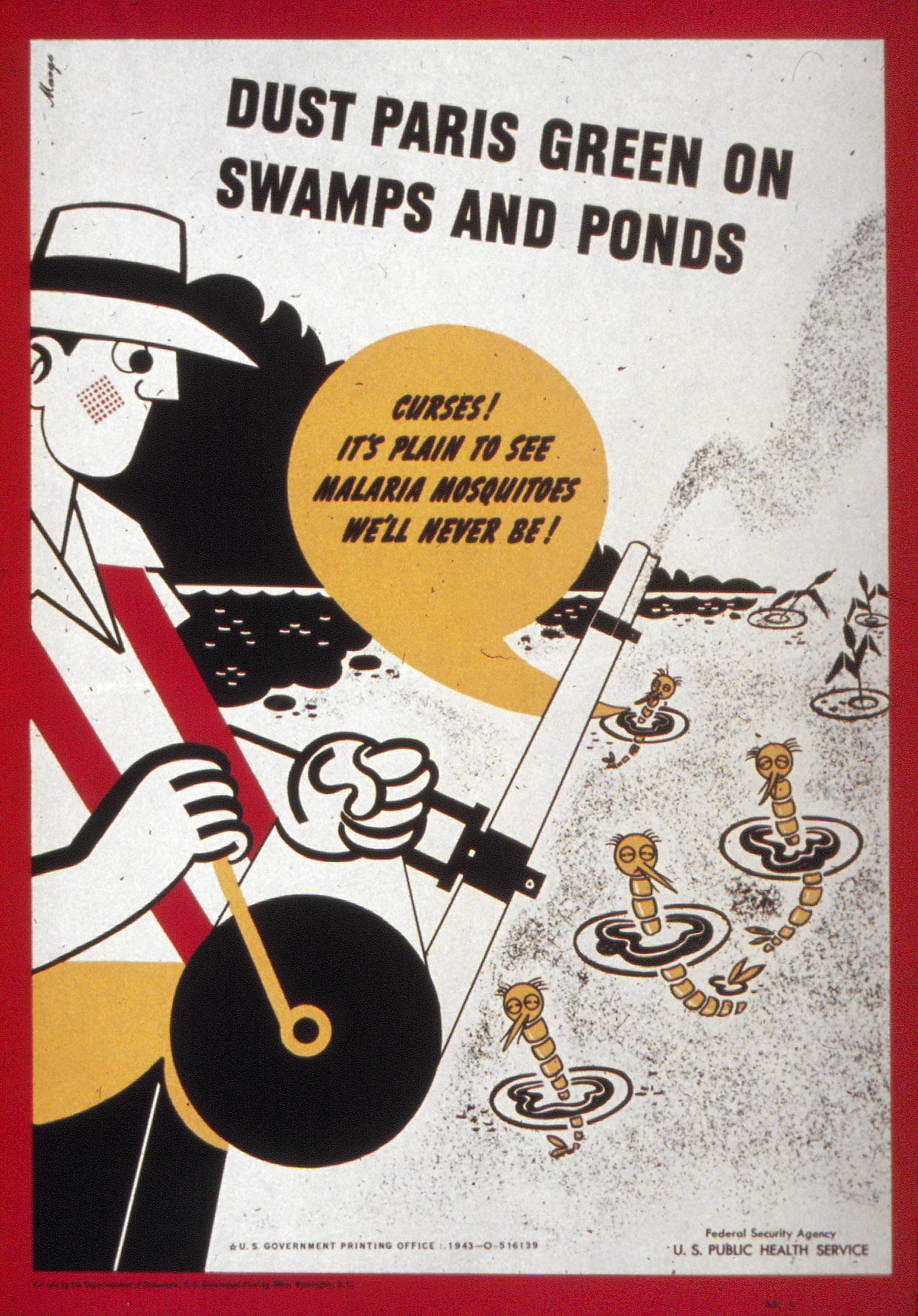
Use as insecticide, poster issued by US Public Health Service

=== Bookbindings ===
Throughout the 19th century, Paris green and similar arsenic pigments were used in books, particularly on bookcloth coverings, textblock edges, decorative labels and onlays, and in printed or manual illustrations. The colorant is particularly prevalent in bookbindings from the 1850s and 1860s published in Germany, England, France, and the United States. Use of arsenic-containing pigments waned in the later part of the 19th-century with heightened awareness of their toxicity and the availability of less toxic chromium- and cobalt-based alternatives. Since February 2024, several German libraries have started to block public access to their stock of 19th century books, to check for the degree of poisoning. The Poison Book Project has cataloged books with these bindings.

=== Wallpaper ===
Paris green became a popular paint in mass-produced wallpaper, which is believed to have shortened lifespans. Prolonged exposure to Paris green pigment dust as a result of its use in wallpaper could result in chronic arsenic poisoning affecting the nervous and digestive systems. Wallpaper swatches from this era have been preserved in the book Shadows from the Walls of Death.

=== Fireworks ===
The pigment was used by various historical pyrotechnic compositions to create blue flame effects. However, commercial use is precluded due to the compound's high toxicity.

== See also ==
- List of colors
- List of inorganic pigments
