= Esther Stevens Brazer =

American historian

Esther Stevens Brazer (April 7, 1898 – October 30, 1945) was an American historian, noted especially for her interest in painted tinware.

Brazer was the great-great-granddaughter of a tinsmith from Maine, Zachariah Brackett Stevens. Alongside Janet Waring, she was a pioneer in the study of American decorative art, especially the field of wall stenciling; she is also remembered for her research into the field of japanning.

Her book Early American Decoration was the first scholarly work on the subject. She was active as a researcher for most of the last twenty years of her life, and was a collector and teacher in addition to being a writer. She was among those experts invited to contribute to The Magazine ANTIQUES under the editorship of Alice Winchester.

She died at age 47 in 1945 and is buried in Evergreen Cemetery in Portland, Maine. After her death, the Historical Society of Early American Decoration was founded in her honor by a group of her students to propagate her work. A small box decorated by Brazer in the style of a book, similar to works made by Zachariah Stevens, is held in the collection of the National Museum of American History.
