= Jacobus Van Der Spiegel =

American silversmith

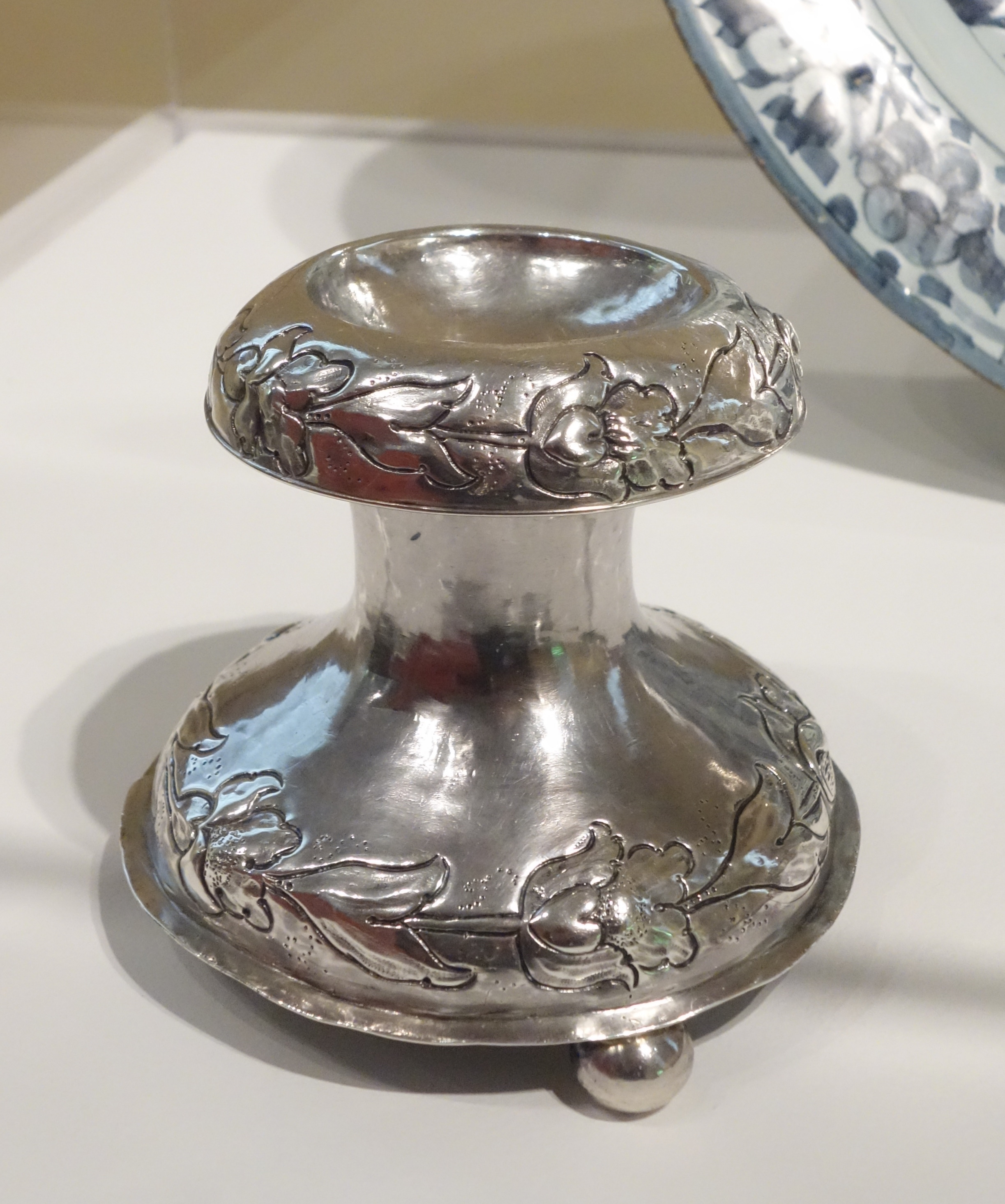
Salt by Jocobus Vander Spiegel, c. 1690

Jacobus Van Der Spiegel (February 5, 1668 – 1708), also known as Jacobus Vander Spiegel, was a silversmith from the Thirteen Colonies, active in New York City.

Van Der Spiegel was born in New York City, where he married Ann Saunders on 21 September 21, 1692, and with whom he had three children. He served in the Union Army along the Albany frontier. He was appointed in 1698 as Constable in New York City, freeman on February 24, 1701, and served as a Deacon of the Reformed Dutch Church at various times from 1703 until his death. His work is collected in the Brooklyn Museum, Metropolitan Museum of Art, Winterthur Museum, and Yale University Art Gallery.
