= Carol Cadou =

American curator and museum director

- Born: Carol Borchert
- Other name: Carol Borchert Cadou
- Education: Wellesley College (BA); University of Delaware (MA); Ohio University (MBA)
- Occupations: Curator; museum director
- Employers: Mount Vernon; Winterthur Museum; Dumbarton House

Carol Borchert Cadou is an American museum curator and administrator who served as the former executive director of The National Society of The Colonial Dames of America, running the society's headquarters at Dumbarton House in Washington, D.C.

== Life and career ==
Born and raised in Ohio, Cadou holds a Bachelor of Arts degree from Wellesley College. She taught English in Japan before earning an American Arts certification at Sotheby's Institute of Art and a Master of Arts degree from the Winterthur Program in Early American Culture at the University of Delaware in 1996. She later received an MBA from Ohio University in 2019.

Prior to becoming NSCDA executive director in September 2021, Cadou served as the Charles F. Montgomery Director and CEO of Winterthur Museum, Garden and Library from May 2018 through May 2021. As Winterthur's director, she oversaw the restoration of the Chandler Farm historic building to serve as her family residence and guided the organization through the COVID-19 pandemic. Cadou had held curatorial and senior leadership roles at George Washington's Mount Vernon historic house and estate since 1999, serving as senior vice president of historic preservation and collections since 2014. She has worked as curator of the Maryland State Art Collection in Annapolis and as a curator at the Historic Charleston Foundation. She has served on the board of governors for the Decorative Arts Trust since 2008.

Cadou has authored, edited, or contributed to a number of books on American decorative arts, architecture, and historic preservation. In 2018, the University of Virginia Press published her edited volume entitled Stewards of Memory: The Past, Present, and Future of Historic Preservation at George Washington’s Mount Vernon.

She is married to Chris Cadou, a professor of aerospace engineering at the University of Maryland, College Park. They have two children, Lilly and William.
