= Bernie, Missouri =

City in Stoddard County, Missouri, United States

- City
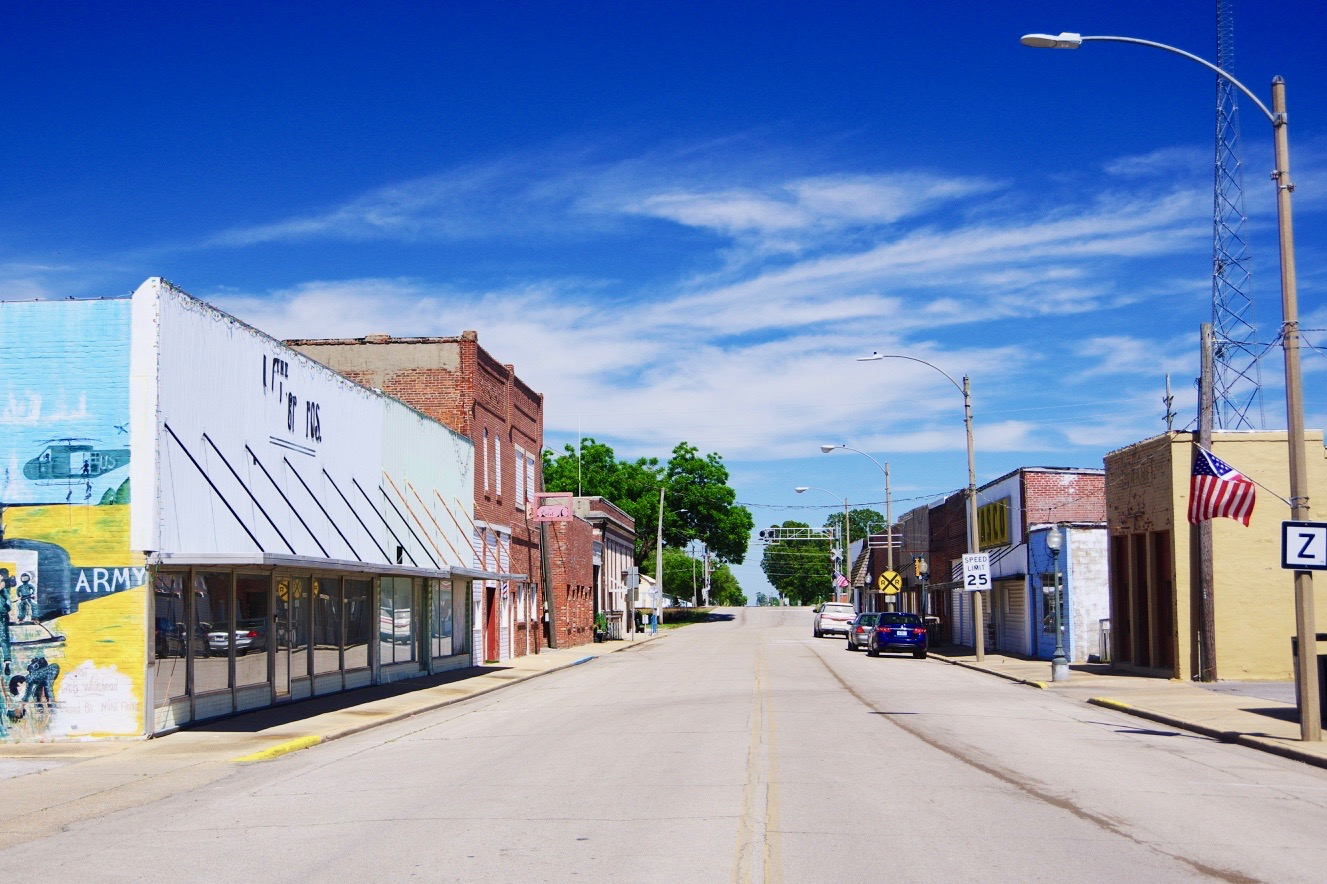
- Main Street

- Location of Bernie, Missouri
- Coordinates: 36°40′18″N 89°58′15″W
- Country: United States
- State: Missouri
- County: Stoddard

Area
  - Total: 1.31 sq mi (3.39 km^{2})
  - Land: 1.31 sq mi (3.39 km^{2})
  - Water: 0 sq mi (0.00 km^{2})
- Elevation: 305 ft (93 m)

Population (2020)
  - Total: 1,859
  - Density: 1,421.4/sq mi (548.81/km^{2})
- Time zone: UTC-6 (Central (CST))
  - Summer (DST): UTC-5 (CDT)
- ZIP code: 63822
- Area code: 573
- FIPS code: 29-04960
- GNIS feature ID: 2394150
- Website: City of Bernie, Missouri

Bernie is a city in southern Stoddard County, Missouri, United States. The population was 1,859 at the 2020 census.

== History ==
Bernie was laid out in 1890, and named after Bernice "Bernie" Crumb, the daughter of an early Euro-American settler. A post office called Bernie has been in operation since 1889. The city was incorporated in 1889. Bernie was situated along the St. Louis Southwestern Railway.

== Geography ==
Bernie is located in the Missouri Bootheel, eight miles south of Dexter and approximately nine miles north of Malden on Missouri Route 25. The St. Francis River is about ten miles to the west on Missouri Route U.

According to the United States Census Bureau, the city has a total area of 1.31 square miles (3.39 km^{2}), all land.

== Demographics ==
Historical population
Census	Pop.	Note	%±
1900	333		—
1910	742		122.8%
1920	1,571		111.7%
1930	1,031		−34.4%
1940	1,160		12.5%
1950	1,308		12.8%
1960	1,578		20.6%
1970	1,641		4.0%
1980	1,975		20.4%
1990	1,847		−6.5%
2000	1,777		−3.8%
2010	1,958		10.2%
2020	1,859		−5.1%
U.S. Decennial Census

=== 2020 census ===
As of the 2020 census, Bernie had a population of 1,859. The median age was 40.4 years. 25.3% of residents were under the age of 18 and 19.8% of residents were 65 years of age or older. For every 100 females there were 88.2 males, and for every 100 females age 18 and over there were 86.7 males age 18 and over.

0.0% of residents lived in urban areas, while 100.0% lived in rural areas.

There were 756 households in Bernie, of which 31.1% had children under the age of 18 living in them. Of all households, 41.0% were married-couple households, 20.1% were households with a male householder and no spouse or partner present, and 32.4% were households with a female householder and no spouse or partner present. About 31.8% of all households were made up of individuals and 14.5% had someone living alone who was 65 years of age or older.

There were 874 housing units, of which 13.5% were vacant. The homeowner vacancy rate was 2.2% and the rental vacancy rate was 10.3%.

Racial composition as of the 2020 census
Race	Number	Percent
White	1,674	90.0%
Black or African American	69	3.7%
American Indian and Alaska Native	7	0.4%
Asian	0	0.0%
Native Hawaiian and Other Pacific Islander	0	0.0%
Some other race	23	1.2%
Two or more races	86	4.6%
Hispanic or Latino (of any race)	46	2.5%

=== Income and poverty ===
As of 2000 the median income for a household in the city was $24,085, and the median income for a family was $30,847. Males had a median income of $24,922 versus $16,196 for females. The per capita income for the city was $13,096. About 15.8% of families and 26.6% of the population were below the poverty line, including 28.1% of those under age 18 and 28.3% of those age 65 or over.

=== 2010 census ===
As of the census of 2010, there were 1,958 people, 831 households, and 549 families residing in the city. The population density was 1,494.7 inhabitants per square mile (577.1/km^{2}). There were 916 housing units at an average density of 699.2 per square mile (270.0/km^{2}). The racial makeup of the city was 94.89% White, 2.20% Black or African American, 0.61% Native American, 0.10% Asian, 0.77% from other races, and 1.43% from two or more races. Hispanic or Latino of any race were 1.43% of the population.

There were 831 households, of which 32.1% had children under the age of 18 living with them, 47.4% were married couples living together, 13.6% had a female householder with no husband present, 5.1% had a male householder with no wife present, and 33.9% were non-families. 29.1% of all households were made up of individuals, and 14.7% had someone living alone who was 65 years of age or older. The average household size was 2.36 and the average family size was 2.91.

The median age in the city was 40 years. 24.5% of residents were under the age of 18; 8.2% were between the ages of 18 and 24; 23.9% were from 25 to 44; 26.2% were from 45 to 64; and 17.3% were 65 years of age or older. The gender makeup of the city was 47.1% male and 52.9% female.

== Education ==
Bernie R-XIII School District, which covers the municipality, operates one elementary school and Bernie Junior High/High School.

The town has a lending library, the Bernie Public Library.

== Notable people ==
- Carl Edward Bailey, 31st governor of Arkansas from 1937 to 1941, was born in Bernie in 1894.
- Narvel Felts, a member of the Rockabilly Hall of Fame, attended Bernie High School.
- James Morton Smith, director of the Wisconsin Historical Society and Winterthur Museum; born in Bernie in 1919.

== See also ==
- List of cities in Missouri
