= Jewett-Kemp-Marlens House =

Historic house in New Hampshire, United States

- U.S. National Register of Historic Places
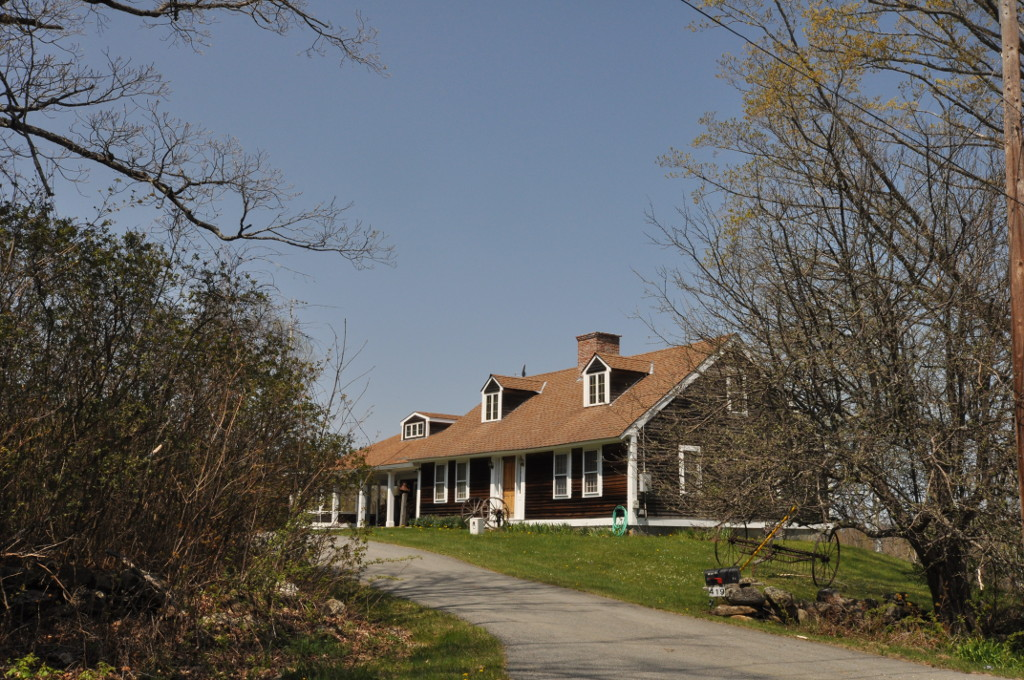

- Location within New Hampshire Location within the United States
- Location: North Rd. 2 mi. N of jct. NH 123, Alstead, New Hampshire
- Coordinates: 43°9′26″N 72°17′36″W
- Area: less than one acre
- Built: 1803
- Architectural style: Colonial, Full New England Cape
- NRHP reference No.: 97000506
- Added to NRHP: May 30, 1997

The Jewett-Kemp-Marlens House is a historic house on North Road in Alstead, New Hampshire. Probably built sometime between 1798 and 1806, the house is notable for the well-preserved and conserved stencilwork of the itinerant 19th-century folk artist Moses Eaton. The house was listed on the National Register of Historic Places in 1997.

== Description and history ==
The Jewett-Kemp-Marlens House stands in what is now a remote rural location, at the effective end of North Road, an unpaved road that was once a main road between Keene and Acworth. It is a 1 1/2-story timber-frame structure, with a gabled roof, clapboarded exterior, and large central chimney. The front roof face is pierced by two gabled dormers, and the center entrance is flanked by sidelight windows. A single-story ell extends to the left of the main block.

The house was probably built sometime between 1798 and 1803, and was definitely standing by 1806. The building was restored in 1996, principally to conserve the artwork of Moses Eaton, an itinerant folk art stenciler, that is on its walls. The stencilwork was probably applied not long after the house's construction, and was protected from damage by alterations in the 1860s that doubled the thickness of the walls as protection against the severe weather conditions that sometimes afflict the area. Although this caused some damage to this artwork, the five walls that have been stenciled are among the best preserved of Eaton's work. Their attribution to the elder Moses Eaton is significant, as much of the known Eaton stencilwork is attributed to his son, who would have been seven in 1806.

== See also ==
- National Register of Historic Places listings in Cheshire County, New Hampshire
