= Joseph Downs =

American decorative arts curator (1895–1954)

- Born: July 24, 1895; Shutesbury, Massachusetts, US
- Died: September 8, 1954 (aged 59); Philadelphia, Pennsylvania, US
- Education: Boston Museum School
- Occupations: Museum curator, scholar
- Employer(s): Metropolitan Museum of Art, Winterthur Museum
- Known for: Founding curator of the Winterthur Museum

Joseph Downs (July 24, 1895 – September 8, 1954) was an American museum curator and scholar of American decorative arts. After 17 years at the Metropolitan Museum of Art, Downs became founding curator of the Winterthur Museum, Garden and Library from 1949 to 1954. His assistant, Charles F. Montgomery, became Winterthur's first director after Downs' death.

== Early life and education ==
Downs was born in Shutesbury, Massachusetts on July 24, 1895, to parents Daniel and Mary MacDonald Downs. He served overseas with the American Expeditionary Forces during World War I, graduated from the Boston Museum School in 1921, and traveled to Europe on a postgraduate fellowship from his alma mater in 1922–23.

== Career ==
Downs worked for two years at the Museum of Fine Arts in Boston and designed furniture for another two years in New York City. He worked as assistant curator and then curator of the decorative arts at the Philadelphia Museum of Art from 1925 to 1932. He returned to New York in 1932 to serve as curator of the American Wing of the Metropolitan Museum of Art, where he created exhibitions and authored more than 150 publications in venues such as Magazine Antiques. He installed the first folk art (Pennsylvania German) period rooms ("House of the Miller at Millbach") ever put in place at an American museum.

In 1949, Henry Francis du Pont hired Downs to catalog du Pont's vast antiques collection at his Winterthur estate in Delaware. When the Winterthur Museum opened to the public in 1951, Downs became the museum's first curator. His associate, Charles F. Montgomery, became assistant curator and succeeded him as chief curator and museum director after his death.

In 1952, Downs published the first volume (American Furniture of the Queen Anne and Chippendale Periods) of a planned monumental study on American furniture. However, his untimely death in Philadelphia on September 8, 1954, meant the three sequel volumes were never written.

== Legacy ==
In 1955, the Joseph Downs Collection of Manuscripts and Printed Ephemera at Winterthur was named in his honor.
