= Scheele's green =

Highly toxic arsenic-based pigment

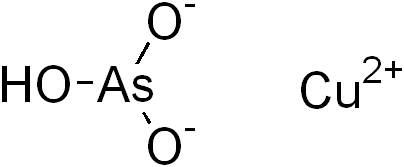

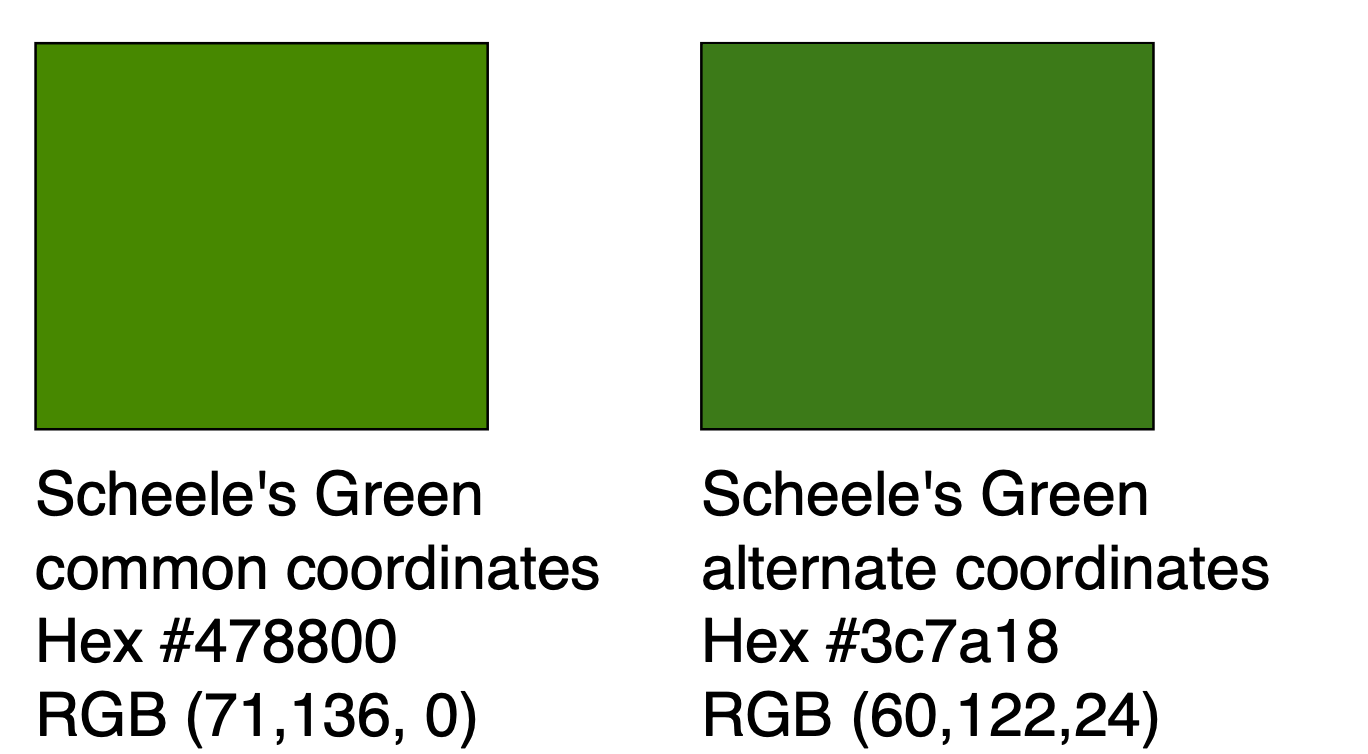

Names
- IUPAC name copper hydrogen arsenite
- Other names Copper arsenite Copper arsenate Swedish green Cupric green

Identifiers
CAS Number	1345-20-6
3D model (JSmol)	Interactive image
ChemSpider	23475
ECHA InfoCard	100.030.573
PubChem CID	25130
CompTox Dashboard (EPA)	DTXSID4058285
- InChI: InChI=1S/AsHO3.Cu/c2-1(3)4;/h2H;/q-2;+2 Key: BPQWCZKMOKHAJF-UHFFFAOYSA-N; InChI=1/AsHO3.Cu/c2-1(3)4;/h2H;/q-2;+2 Key: BPQWCZKMOKHAJF-UHFFFAOYAR
- SMILES: [Cu+2].[O-][As]([O-])O

Properties
Chemical formula	AsCuHO_{3}
Molar mass	187.474

Hazards
- NIOSH (US health exposure limits)
PEL (Permissible)	[1910.1018] TWA 0.010 mg/m^{3}
REL (Recommended)	Ca C 0.002 mg/m^{3} [15-minute]
IDLH (Immediate danger)	Ca [5 mg/m^{3} (as As)]
- Except where otherwise noted, data are given for materials in their standard state (at 25 °C [77 °F], 100 kPa). verify (what is ?) Infobox references

Scheele's green, also called Schloss green, is chemically a cupric hydrogen arsenite (also called copper arsenite or acidic copper arsenite), CuHAsO_{3}. It is chemically related to Paris green. Scheele's green was invented in 1775 by Carl Wilhelm Scheele. Scheele published his method for preparing the pigment in 1778 in the journal of the Royal Swedish Academy of Sciences.By the end of the 19th century, it had virtually replaced the older green pigments based on copper carbonate. It is a yellowish-green pigment commonly used during the early to mid-19th century in paints as well as being directly incorporated into a variety of products as a colorant. It began to fall out of favor after the 1860s because of its toxicity and the instability of its color in the presence of sulfides and various chemical pollutants. The acutely toxic nature of Scheele's green as well as other arsenic-containing green pigments such as Paris green may have contributed to the sharp decline in the popularity of the color green in late Victorian society. By the dawn of the 20th century, Scheele's green had completely fallen out of use as a pigment but was still in use as an insecticide into the 1930s. At least two modern reproductions of Scheele's green hue with modern non-toxic pigments have been made, with similar but non-identical color coordinates: one with hex#3c7a18 (RGB 60, 122, 24) and another with hex#478800 (RGB 71, 136, 0). The latter is the more typically reported color coordinate for Scheele's green.

== Preparation ==
Scheele's green

Color coordinates
- Hex triplet: #478800
- sRGB^{B} (r, g, b): (71, 136, 0)
- HSV (h, s, v): (89°, 100%, 53%)
- CIELCh_{uv} (L, C, h): (51, 68, 118°)
- Source: [10]
- B: Normalized to [0–255] (byte)

The pigment was originally prepared by making a solution of sodium carbonate at a temperature of around 90 °C (194 °F), then slowly adding arsenious oxide, while constantly stirring until everything had dissolved. This produced a sodium arsenite solution. Added to a copper sulfate solution, it produced a green precipitate of effectively insoluble copper arsenite. After filtration the product was dried at about 43 °C (109 °F). To enhance the color, the salt was subsequently heated to 60–70 °C (140–158 °F). The intensity of the color depends on the copper : arsenic ratio, which in turn was affected by the ratio of the starting materials, as well as the temperature.

It has been found that Scheele's green was composed of a variety of different compounds, including copper metaarsenite (CuO·As_{2}O_{3}), copper arsenite salt (CuHAsO_{3} and Cu(AsO_{3})_{2}·3H_{2}O)), neutral copper orthoarsenite (3CuO·As_{2}O_{3}·2H_{2}O), copper arsenate (CuAsO_{2} and Cu(AsO_{2})_{2}), and copper diarsenite (2CuO·As_{2}O_{3}·2H_{2}O).

== Uses ==
Scheele's green was used to color wallpapers, paper furniture linings, and textiles used in clothing and bookbindings, along with paints, wax candles, and even some children's toys. Modern researchers, including the University of Delaware's Poison Book Project, have identified numerous 19th-century cloth-case bindings coloured with Scheele's green, and they advise handling such books with care because the pigment can flake off as toxic dust. Scheele's green is more brilliant and durable than the then-used copper carbonate pigments. However, because of its copper content it tends to fade and blacken when exposed to sulfides, whether in the form of atmospheric hydrogen sulfide or in pigment mixtures based on or containing sulfur. Emerald green, also known as Paris green, was developed later in an attempt to improve Scheele's green. It had the same tendency to blacken, but was more durable.

Despite evidence of its high toxicity, Scheele's green was also used as a food dye for sweets such as green blancmange, a favorite of traders in 19th-century Greenock; this led to a long-standing Scottish prejudice against green sweets.

While sources may conflict with each other, one source accounts that the color Scheele’s green was used on posters for the Siege and commune of Paris. These “posters range in date from 1869–1887."

Scheele's green was used as an insecticide in the 1930s, together with Paris green.

== Toxicity ==
In the 19th century, the toxicity of arsenic compounds was not readily known. Nineteenth-century journals contained reports of children wasting away in bright green rooms, of ladies in green dresses swooning, and of newspaper printers being overcome by arsenic vapors. There is one example of acute poisoning of children attending a Christmas party where dyed candles were burned.

Although some European nations started banning arsenic-containing pigments in the 1830s and 1840s, Scheele's green did not completely fall out of favor until the 1860s. Publicity associated with the 1861 death of 19-year-old Matilda Scheueur as a result of her job dusting artificial foliage with the pigment increased public awareness of the toxicity of Scheele's green. An article "Pretty Poison-Wreaths" described her repeated illness from arsenic poisoning leading to her death, and detailed autopsy findings of eyes and fingernails turned green from the pigment. By the 1890s the last brand of wallpaper using it ceased production.

=== Illness associated with arsenic containing wallpaper ===
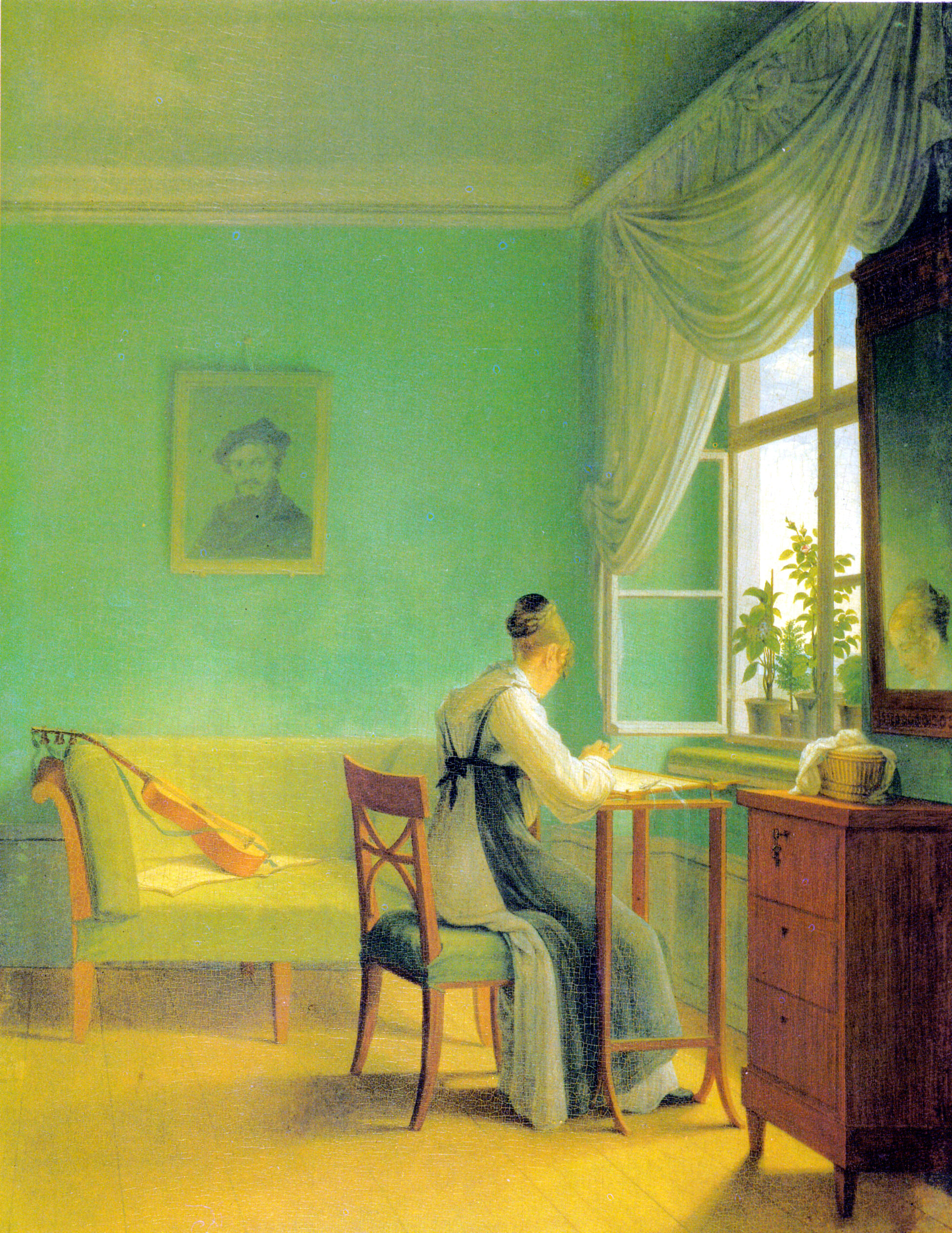
Woman Embroidering by Georg Friedrich Kersting (1812)

Two main theories on the cause of wallpaper poisoning events have been proposed: dust particles caused by pigment and paper flaking, and toxic gas production. Tiny particles of the pigment can flake off and become airborne, and then are absorbed by the lungs. Alternatively, toxic gas can be released from compounds containing arsenic following certain chemical processes, such as heating, or metabolism by an organism. When the wallpaper becomes damp and moldy, the pigment may be metabolised, causing the release of poisonous arsine gas (AsH_{3}). Fungi genera such as Scopulariopsis or Paecilomyces release arsine gas, when they are growing on a substance containing arsenic. The Italian physician Bartolomeo Gosio published in 1893 his results on "Gosio gas", that was subsequently shown to contain trimethylarsine. Under wet conditions, the mold Scopulariopsis brevicaulis produced significant amounts of methyl arsines via methylation of arsenic-containing inorganic pigments, especially Paris green and Scheele's green.

In these compounds, the arsenic is either pentavalent or trivalent (arsenic is in group 15), depending on the compound. In humans, arsenic of these valences is readily absorbed by the gastrointestinal tract, which accounts for its high toxicity. Pentavalent arsenic tends to be reduced to trivalent arsenic and trivalent arsenic tends to proceed via oxidative methylation in which the trivalent arsenic is made into mono, di and trimethylated products by methyltransferases and an S-adenosyl-methionine methyl donating cofactor. However, newer studies indicate that trimethylarsine has a low toxicity, and could therefore not account for the death and the severe health problems observed in the 19th century.

Arsenic is not only toxic, but it also has carcinogenic effects.

=== Role in Napoleon's death ===
During his exile on St. Helena, Napoleon resided in a house in which the rooms were painted bright green, his favorite color. The cause of his death is generally believed to have been stomach cancer, and arsenic exposure has been linked to an increased risk of gastric carcinoma. Analysis of samples of his hair revealed significant amounts of arsenic. As St. Helena has a rather damp climate, it is likely that fungus grew on the walls. It has also been suggested that the presence of such abnormally high levels of arsenic might be due to attempts at preserving his body. However, more recent research has argued that this theory is false, and Napoleon did indeed die of stomach cancer.

== See also ==
- Not to be confused with copper arsenate
- List of inorganic pigments
- Shadows from the Walls of Death
