= Poison Book Project =

University of Delaware cataloging project

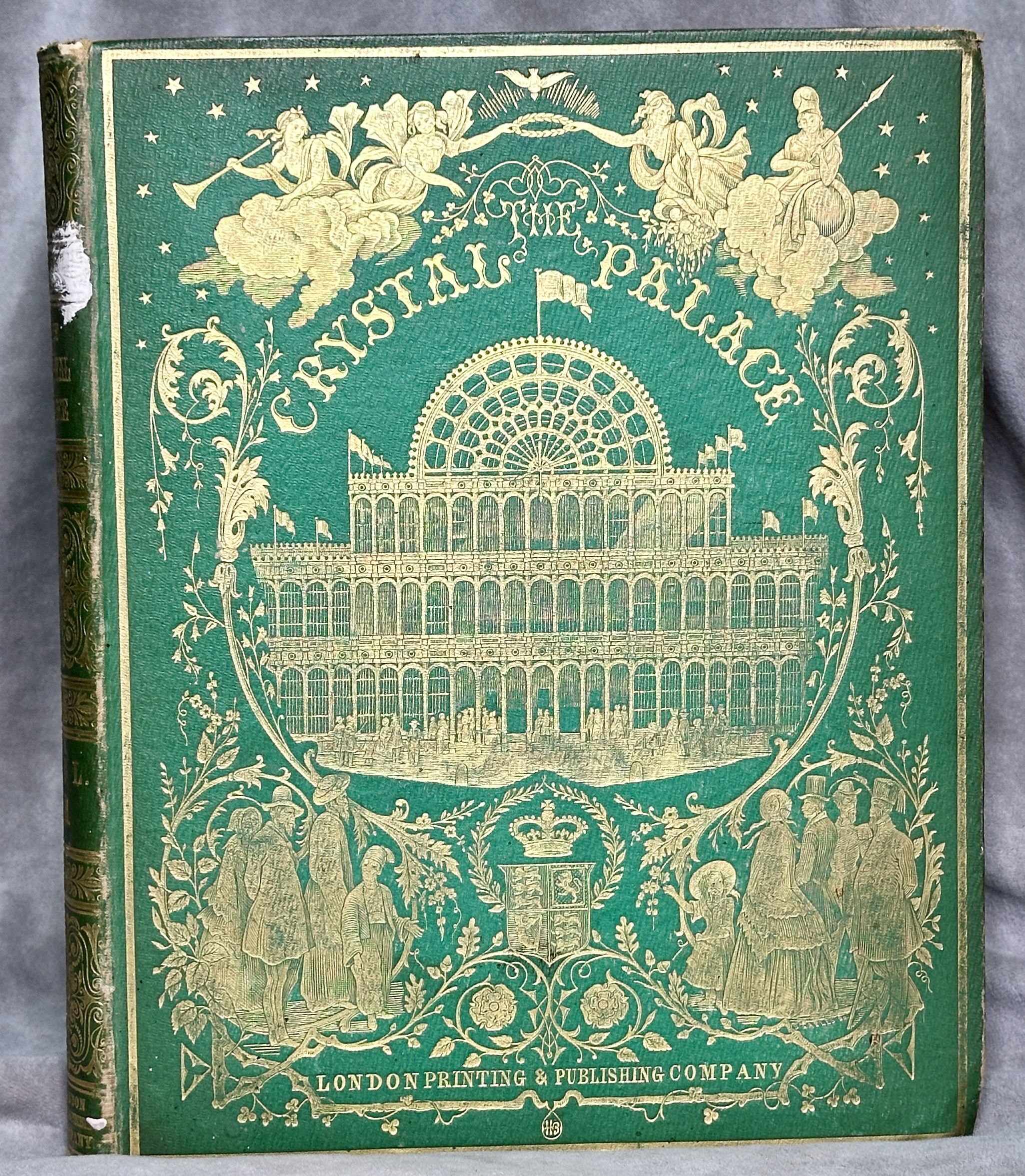
The bookcloth of the green variant of this work has been identified to contain arsenic

The Poison Book Project is a project of the Winterthur Museum, Garden and Library and the University of Delaware to identify and catalog books known to contain poisonous substances, particularly arsenic in Paris green pigments. It was started in 2019 when Winterthur staff members Melissa Tedone and Rosie Grayburn identified a book containing Paris green in the institution's collection. The project has since confirmed at least 100 other books from libraries across the world that contain Paris green, allowing librarians to take measures to minimize the risk to those handling the books.

== Origins ==
The project was started by Melissa Tedone, head of library materials conservation at the Winterthur Museum, Garden and Library in Delaware, United States. In 2019, whilst conserving one of the library's books, the 1857 Rustic Adornments for Homes and Taste, she noticed through a microscope that fragments of the green pigment-dyed starch used to strengthen the bookcloth were flaking away. Tedone gave samples to the museum's laboratory head Rosie Grayburn. Grayburn used an x-ray fluorescence spectrometer on the substance which showed it contained copper and arsenic.

The use of bookcloths as a cheaper replacement for leather bindings became popular in the 1840s. They were colored with pigments from a number of substances. One of these, Paris green, also known as emerald green, was an arsenic-based pigment that produced a vivid green color. It is estimated that tens of thousands of books were printed by the 1860s, when Paris green went out of fashion.

Paris green bookcloths are unlikely to be a risk to the general public, but they might cause arsenic poisoning in those who handle the books frequently, such as librarians and researchers. Paris green readily flakes into a dust, invisible to the naked eye, that coats nearby surfaces. Exposure to the dust can irritate the eyes, nose, and throat and might cause dizziness and nausea. The project has also identified other hazardous substances used in pigments, including lead, chromium, and mercury. These are less toxic than Paris green and less likely to flake when handled. These pigments include chrome yellow, which contains lead, and vermillion, which contains mercury sulfide.

Shortly after starting the project Tedone and Grayburn identified nine further books from the Winterthur collection that contained arsenic. These were removed from general circulation and sealed in plastic bags. An early project at the Library Company of Philadelphia found 28 books.

== Work ==
The project attempts to identify individual editions of historic books that contain hazardous materials such as arsenic. The editions are added to a database that is shared so that institutions can check it against their collections. The project wants to make sure librarians are aware of potentially hazardous books and take measures to store the books safely.

The initial stage of checking new books begins with a visual assessment followed by x-ray fluorescence (XRF) spectroscopy. Positive XRF results are confirmed by Raman spectroscopy by the Winterthur/University of Delaware Program in Art Conservation. Rarely, in complex cases, a sample of material is sent for destructive testing at the University of Delaware's College of Agriculture and Natural Resources Soil Testing Program.

By April 2022 the project had identified 88 books containing Paris green, of which more than 70 contained the pigment in their bookcloths (the remainder in illustrations or labels). By September 2022 more than 101 books had been identified. The project does not seek to have the books destroyed but rather kept in controlled conditions. The project advertises itself with bookmarks showing examples of books containing Paris green; these have been sent to libraries in 49 US states and 19 countries abroad.

== See also ==
- Shadows from the Walls of Death, a book compiled by Dr. Robert C. Kedzie from samples of arsenic-laced wallpapers
