= Wendell Garrett =

American art historian and editor

Wendell D. Garrett (October 9, 1929 – November 14, 2012) was an American historian, expert on Americana and American-origin decorative arts and editor.

== Early life and education ==
Born in Los Angeles, Garrett received a bachelor's degree in history from the University of California, Los Angeles. He obtained a master's degree from the Winterthur Program in American Material Culture at the University of Delaware and a second master's degree in American history from Harvard University.

== Career ==
Wendell Garrett served as the editor of The Magazine Antiques from 1972 to 1990. He remained as Antiques editor at large from 1990 until his death in 2012. Garrett also served as the senior vice president in the American Decorative Arts department at Sotheby's from 1989 until March 2009. In April 2009 he launched Wendell Garrett and Associates, an appraisal service for the fine and decorative arts with his associate Patricia Arnold, which remained active until his death.

Wendell Garrett appeared as an appraiser in every season of Antiques Roadshow, beginning with its debut season in 1997, through filming of the 2013 season during the summer of 2012. He received the Henry Francis du Pont Award from the Winterthur Museum, Garden and Library in 1994.

In the last month of his life Garrett moved from his Manhattan apartment to a hospice in Williston, Vermont due to declining health. He died at the Williston hospice on November 14, 2012 at the age of 83.

== Books ==
- Apthorp House, 1760-1960 (1960)
- The Diary and Autobiography of John Adams (1961), with L.H. Butterfield
- Adams Family Correspondence, vols. 1-2 (1963), with L.H. Butterfield
- The Arts in Early American History (1965), with Walter Muir Whitehill
- The Earliest Diary of John Adams (1966), with L.H. Butterfield
- Reverend E.B. Hillard’s Last Men of the Revolution (1968), with Archibald Macleish
- The Arts in America: The Nineteenth Century (1969), with Joseph T. Butler
- Thomas Jefferson Redivivus (1971)
- Classical America: The Federal Style and Beyond (1992)
- Victorian America: Classical Romanticism to Gilded Opulence (1993)
- Monticello and the Legacy of Thomas Jefferson (1994)
- Our Changing White House (1994), editor
- American Colonial: Puritan Simplicity to Georgian Grace (1994)
- George Washington’s Mount Vernon (1998), editor
- American Home: From Colonial Simplicity to the Modern Adventure (2001)
- The Legacy of John Adams (2008)
- Thomas Jefferson Illuminated (2009)
