= Homer Eaton Keyes =

American author and professor

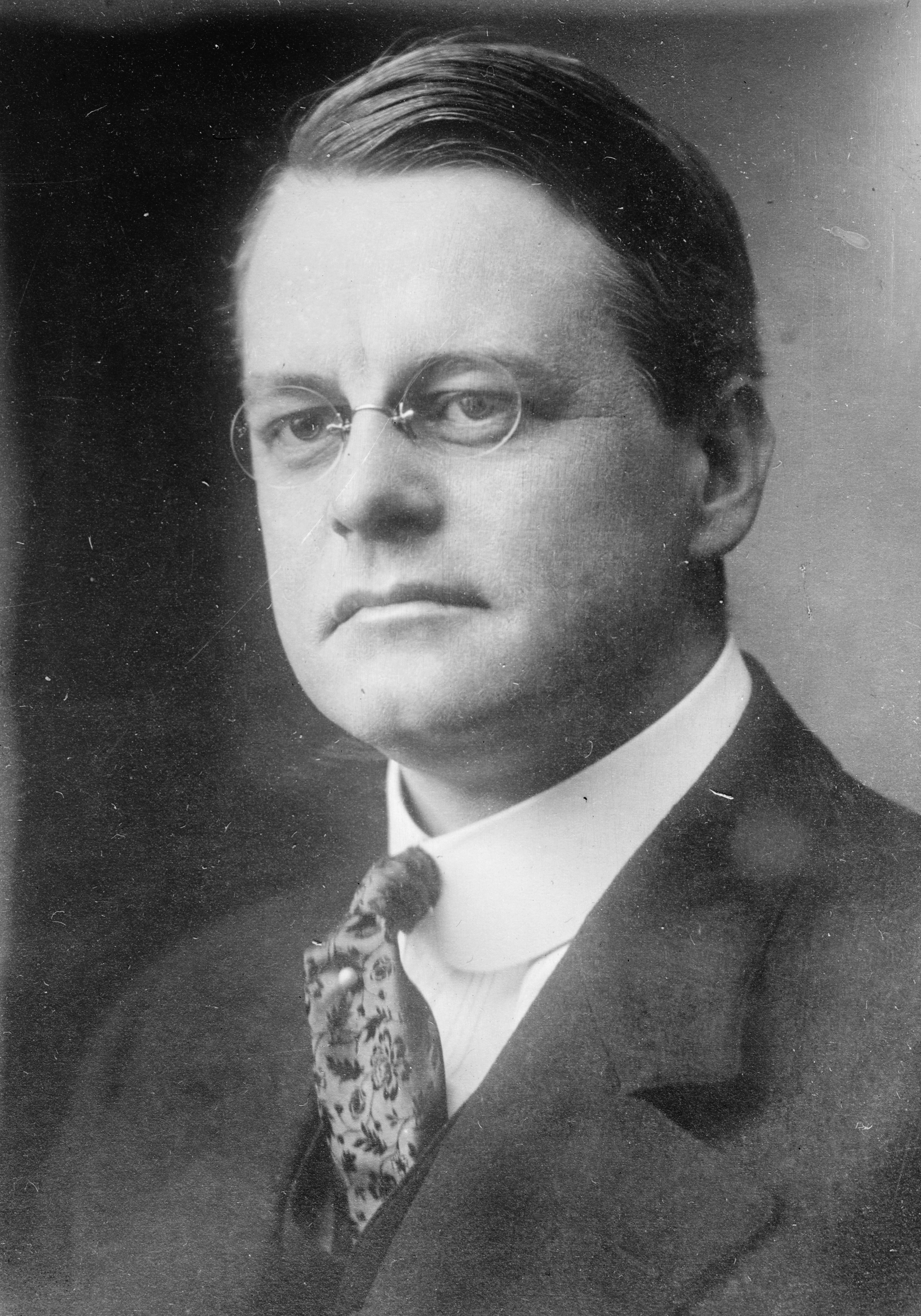
Homer Eaton Keyes c. 1913–1915

Homer Eaton Keyes (1875 – October 8, 1938), was an author and professor at Dartmouth College, and the founder and editor of the magazine Antiques.

He had a sister, Rowena Saxe Keyes, who married William Sheafe Chase, rector of Christ Church in Brooklyn, in 1912. Homer Eaton Keyes was married to Caroline Abbott (c.1875–1938).

At his death Keyes was succeeded as editor of Antiques by Alice Winchester, his former secretary.
