= Jean Lipman =

American artist, art historian and art collector

Jean Herzberg Lipman (1909 – June 20, 1998) was an American artist, collector, and art historian, a pioneer in the study of American folk art.

== Biography ==
A native of Manhattan, where she was born Jean Herzberg, Lipman grew up in Midtown before receiving her BA from Wellesley College and her MA in art history from New York University, taking as the topic of her master's thesis a collection of profile portraits from Florence. She was married to Howard Lipman, an investment banker and sculptor, who shared her interests. She began collecting folk art in 1936 with the goal of furnishing a home in Connecticut. In 1938 she became an associate editor of Art in America, moving to the position of editor two years later; she remained in this post until 1971, when she moved to the Whitney Museum of American Art to become director of publications. Art in America was devoted to the entire history of American art, but Lipman took especial care to introduce American folk art to its pages; during her tenure it grew from a small scholarly publication, with a circulation of a few hundred, to a widely influential magazine.

Jean and Howard Lipman sold their collection of folk art to Stephen Clark of the New York State Historical Association in 1950; nevertheless, she remained committed to the subject, continuing to research and write. She collaborated with Alice Winchester and Mary Black in some of her work, and produced monographs about Rufus Porter and Jurgan Frederick Huge, among other works. With her husband she began again to collect American folk art, selling the new collection to the American Folk Art Museum in 1981. The couple also collected modern American sculptor, eventually acquiring works by Alexander Calder, Donald Judd, Louise Nevelson, and David Smith, among others; these they donated to the Whitney Museum of American Art. Lipman wrote extensively in this field as well. In 1974, Lipman organized an exhibit of American folk art at the Whitney Museum, writing the accompanying book, The Flowering of American Folk Art, with Alice Winchester. In 1980 she and Thomas N. Armstrong III co-edited another exhibition catalogue for the museum. Other exhibits followed in 1986 and 1990.

As a historian, Lipman came to specialize in the fields of American painted furniture and folk carving. She was a trustee of the American Folk Art Museum from 1965 to 1978, later becoming a trustee emerita. Later in life, she was also active as a painter and a collage artist; beginning in 1981 she showed her work in numerous museum and gallery shows. Late in life she moved to Carefree, Arizona, where she died. She was survived by her son, Peter, and two grandsons, Howard having died in 1992.

The Lipmans' papers are currently housed in the Archives of American Art of the Smithsonian Institution, which also owns an interview conducted with her in 1973. Other archives related to her work are housed at the American Folk Art Museum and the Museum of Modern Art.
