= Janet Waring =

American art historian

Janet Waring (January 4, 1870 – January 8, 1941) was an American art historian specializing in American decorative arts.

== Biography ==
A native of Yonkers, New York, Waring was the daughter of hat manufacturer John T. Waring; her father was the original builder of Greystone, later to become the home of Samuel J. Tilden and Samuel Untermyer. For much of her life she was active in the affairs of the Episcopal Church, serving on the Westchester County branch of the women's auxiliary of the board of missions, and chairing the women's auxiliary of St. John's Protestant Episcopal Church; at one time she was vice-chairman of the women's auxiliary of the Episcopal Diocese of New York. She was a member of the Colony Club of New York and the Society of Mayflower Descendants. Interested in the history of stenciling, she compiled a large collection of stencil designs taken from rooms and furniture. Her research, along with that of Esther Stevens Brazer, was instrumental in reviving interest in the art of stenciling in the twentieth century, some years after it had gone out of fashion. Her 1937 book, Early American Stencils on Walls and Furniture, has been called "seminal" and "definitive" in the field. Waring died in Yonkers after a long illness. She is buried at Woodlawn Cemetery.

A collection of Waring's photographs of stencils, likely made in connection with the publication of her book in 1937, is held by the Archives of American Art of the Smithsonian Institution; it contains images of work by Moses Eaton, Jr., William Eaton, Ivers White, George Lord, Lambert Hitchcock, Jarred Johnson, and Thomas Jefferson Gildersleeve.
