= Bernie R-XIII School District =

School district in Missouri, U.S.

Address
- 516 West Main Avenue Bernie, Missouri, 63822; United States

District information
- Grades: PreK-12
- Superintendent: Brad Botsch
- NCES District ID: 2904950

Students and staff
- Enrollment: 550
- Staff: 42.55 (on an FTE basis)
- Student–teacher ratio: 12.34

Other information
- Telephone: (573) 293-5333
- Fax: (573) 293-5731
- Website: www.bernie.k12.mo.us

The Bernie R-XIII School District is a public school district in Stoddard County, Missouri, United States, based in Bernie, Missouri.

Much of it is in Stoddard County. A portion extends into Dunklin County.

== Schools ==
The Bernie R-XIII School District has one elementary school and one high school.

- Bernie Elementary School
- Bernie Junior High/High School
