= Debra Hess Norris =

U.S. art conservator and academic administrator

Debra Hess Norris is an American art conservator and academic administrator who is the incoming interim dean of the University of Delaware College of Arts and Sciences. She is the chair and professor of photograph conservation. She is also the Unidel Henry Francis du Pont Chair and director of the Winterthur/University of Delaware Program in Art Conservation (WUDPAC). She received her master's degree from the same program at which she teaches.
