= James Morton Smith =

American historian, educator, and museum director

- Smith in 1975
- Born: May 28, 1919; Bernie, Missouri, US
- Died: March 19, 2012 (aged 92); Elkton, Maryland, US
- Education: Southern Illinois University (BA); University of Oklahoma (MA); Cornell University (PhD)
- Occupations: Historian, educator, administrator
- Employer(s): Winterthur Museum, Wisconsin Historical Society
- Spouse: Kathryn E. Hegler (married 1945)

James Morton Smith (May 28, 1919 – March 19, 2012) was an American historian and educator who served as director of the Wisconsin Historical Society from 1970 to 1976 and director of Winterthur Museum, Garden and Library from 1976 to 1984. He received a Guggenheim Fellowship and a fellowship from the American Council of Learned Societies, both in 1960.

== Life and career ==
Born in Bernie, Missouri, Smith served in the United States Coast Guard during World War II and earned his BA from Southern Illinois University in 1941, his MA from the University of Oklahoma in 1942, and PhD in US history and constitutional law from Cornell University in 1951. He taught US history at Butler University, Ohio State University, Duke University, College of William & Mary, and Cornell University in addition to his director roles at the Wisconsin Historical Society and Winterthur Museum. He authored seven scholarly books, including a seminal three-volume collection of the correspondence of Thomas Jefferson and James Madison in 1995, and also edited publications at Omohundro Institute of Early American History and Culture.

Smith married Kathryn E. Hegler in 1945 and had two children, James and Melissa. He died after a long illness at his home in Elkon, Maryland, at the age of 92.

== Publications ==
- Jefferson, Thomas; Madison, James (1995). Smith, James Morton (ed.). The Republic of Letters: The Correspondence between Thomas Jefferson and James Madison, 1776-1826. Vol. 1–3. New York: Norton. ISBN 978-0-393-03691-6. OCLC 31243414.
- Smith, James Morton (1973). Politics and Society in American History. Englewood Cliffs, NJ: Prentice-Hall. ISBN 978-0-13-686782-1. OCLC 402353.
- Smith, James Morton (1971). The Constitution: Interpretations of American History. New York: Harper and Row. ISBN 978-0-06-046337-3. OCLC 1154305849.
- Smith, James Morton (1969). George Washington: A Profile. New York: Hill and Wang. ISBN 978-0-8090-9669-5. OCLC 12614.
- Smith, James Morton (1956). Freedom's Fetters: The Alien and Sedition Laws and American Civil Liberties. Ithaca, NY: Cornell University Press. OCLC 290889.
- Smith, James Morton, ed. (1959). Seventeenth-Century America: Essays in Colonial History. Chapel Hill: Published for the Omohundro Institute of Early American History and Culture by the University of North Carolina Press. ISBN 978-0-8078-4018-4. OCLC 419757.
- Smith, James Morton; Murphy, Paul L. (1958). Liberty and Justice: A Historical Record of American Constitutional Development. New York: Knopf. OCLC 1017280.
