= Leslie Greene Bowman =

American museum administrator (born 1956)

- Born: November 9, 1956 (age 69); Springfield, Ohio, US
- Education: University of Delaware (MA 1981); Miami University (BA 1978)
- Occupation: Museum administrator
- Employer: Thomas Jefferson Foundation
- Organization: Committee for the Preservation of the White House

Leslie Greene Bowman (born November 9, 1956) is an American museum administrator and decorative arts historian who served as president of the Thomas Jefferson Foundation, which owns and runs Monticello, from 2008 to 2023. She previously worked in progressively responsible curatorial roles at the Los Angeles County Museum of Art (1980–1997) and served as director of the National Museum of Wildlife Art (1997–1999) and Winterthur Museum, Garden and Library (1999–2008).

== Life and career ==
Born in Springfield, Ohio, Bowman received her PhB from Miami University (Why does this section say that she received a PhB from Miami University when it says above in the introductory info. that she received a BA from that institution?) in 1978 and her MA from the Winterthur Program in Early American Culture, which the Winterthur Museum jointly administers with the University of Delaware, in 1981. She has taught American decorative arts history at University of Southern California and University of California, Los Angeles and worked as a consultant curator for Oakland Museum of California. Among her signature accomplishments at Winterthur Museum was arranging for a 2002 conservation easement on the 970-acre property to ensure it would never be developed, along with a campaign to attract new audiences through children's programming and rotating and traveling exhibitions.

She has been a member of the Committee for the Preservation of the White House since 1993, serving under five presidents. In 2016, the Daughters of the American Revolution awarded her its Historic Preservation Medal. She has served as a trustee of the National Trust for Historic Preservation, board member of the Association of Art Museum Directors, and accreditation commissioner for the American Alliance of Museums. She is a historian of the American Arts and Crafts movement.

Bowman collaborated to curate three traveling exhibitions and author accompanying exhibition catalogs entitled American Arts & Crafts: Virtue in Design (1990), American Rococo, 1750–1775: Elegance in Ornament (1992, coauthor Morrison Heckscher from the Metropolitan Museum of Art), and The Arts and Crafts Movement in California: Living the Good Life (1993).

== Personal life ==
Bowman was married to Cortland Neuhoff and had one daughter, Haley Neuhoff.
