= Moses Eaton Jr. =

American itinerant folk stencil artist (1796–1886)

- Eaton c. 1860
- Born: August 3, 1796; Hancock, New Hampshire, U.S.
- Died: November 16, 1886 (aged 90); Dublin, New Hampshire, U.S.
- Resting place: Pine Ridge Cemetery, Hancock, New Hampshire, U.S.
- Known for: early New England stencil
- Spouse: Rebecca Platt
- Children: 3

Moses Eaton, Jr. (August 3, 1796 – November 16, 1886) was an American itinerant folk stencil artist. His home, with many examples of his work, was added to the National Register of Historic Places in 1988.

== Early life ==
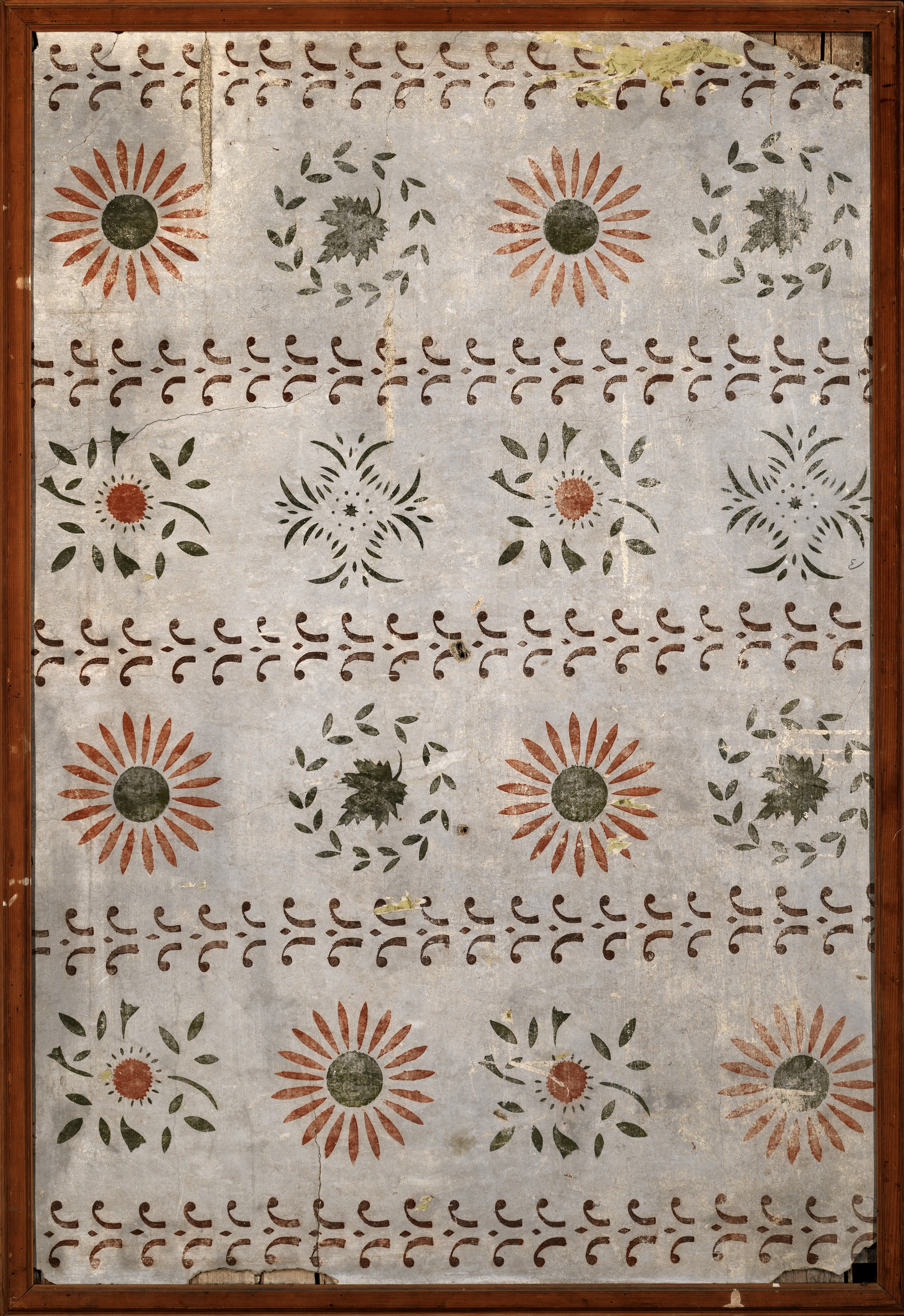
Section of stenciled plaster wall done by Eaton

Eaton was born in Hancock, New Hampshire, to Moses Eaton Sr. and Esther Ware Eaton in 1796. His father, Moses Eaton Senior, under whom he trained before setting out on his own, has been called "the most documented stenciler of New England" by the Center for Painted Wall Preservation. Eaton Jr. was called "the most prolific of early stencilers". His work was described as not being from a trained artist but "a farmer with a sense of color and design".

== Career ==
Eaton originally worked with his father and eventually ran his own business, traveling through New Hampshire and into Maine. He usually used only two colors and balanced "leafy floral and fruit designs with geometric motifs". His work was known for its big bold patterns and bright colors. As he did his pattern work he would also offer to paint people's plaster walls in shades of ochre, raspberry and gray. His stencils were made of very heavy brown paper which had been stiffened with oil. Some of his motifs included pineapples, weeping willows, flower baskets and flower spray.

He worked alongside muralist Rufus Porter in 1824, and the two of them decorated the interior of the Hancock Inn as well as other local homes. Their traditional payment for one painted and stenciled room was $10.

In addition to stencil work, Eaton used block printing with blocks of wood carved from maple, pine and ash. He would use these to make patterns on paper and cloth using oil paints.

Eaton married Rebecca Platt in 1835 and they settled in Hancock and had three children. While he still continued to stencil, his focus was on farming, raising corn, Devon cattle and Blue Hen chickens. In later years, they moved to Dublin, New Hampshire, to live with their daughter and did stenciling in the front parlor of her house, discovered in 1918 under wallpaper.

== Death and legacy ==
Eaton died in 1886. His stencil kit was found in the attic of his daughter's home in Dublin, which made it easier to identify his work. Within it were "eight large brushes and 78 stencils" as well as some vermillion paint. The kit is held by Historic New England. His work was popularized and publicized by Janet Waring in her book Early American Wall Stencils. A sample box containing ten panels of his stencil designs is held by the American Folk Art Museum. Designs by both him and his father are still sold today in stores focusing on early American decorative arts.
