= Shadows from the Walls of Death =

Book containing dangerously toxic substances

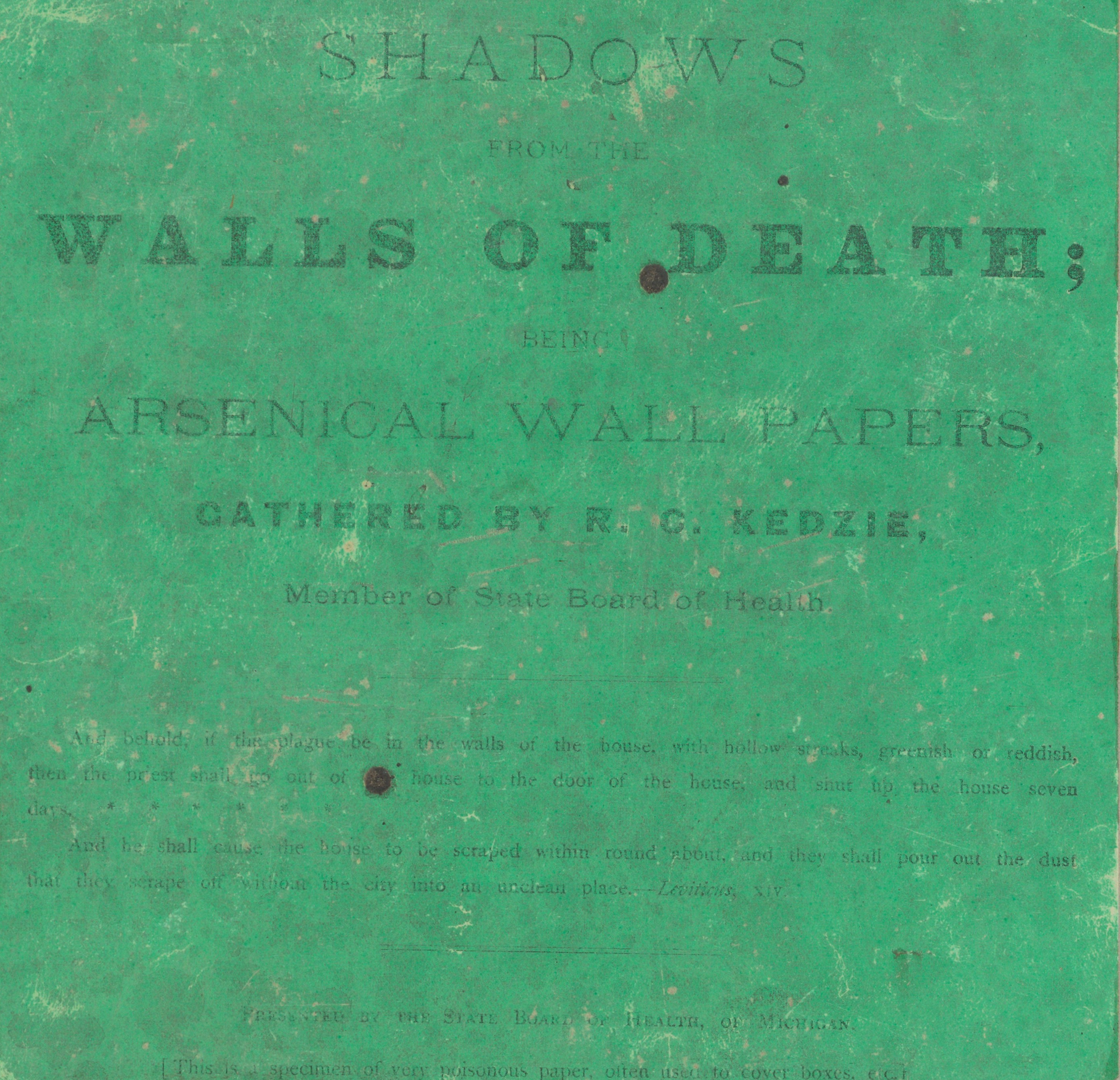
- The frontispiece of the book Shadows from the Walls of Death
- Author: Dr. Robert C. Kedzie
- Language: English
- Publication date: 1874
- Publication place: United States of America
- Media type: Print
- Pages: 100

Shadows from the Walls of Death: Facts and Inferences Prefacing a Book of Specimens of Arsenical Wall Papers is an 1874 book by Dr. Robert C. Kedzie (1823–1902) of Michigan.

The book warns of the dangers of then-commonly used arsenic-pigmented wallpaper. It is an essay by Kedzie that introduces an album of 86 samples of toxic wallpapers. The book itself contains a dangerous concentration of arsenic compounds. The successful campaign against arsenical wallpapers urged by the book, along with the dangerous amount of the poison contained in the volume has led to the destruction of the vast majority of its original print run. Only five of the original 100 copies currently survive; the other 95 copies were deaccessioned and destroyed by the libraries who were its original recipients. The surviving copies may only be handled with special precautions.

As of 2026, the remaining copies were held at Harvard University Medical School, the U.S. National Library of Medicine in Bethesda, Maryland (two copies), and the university libraries of Michigan State University and the University of Michigan. One of the copies in the National Library of Medicine has been digitized and is freely available online.

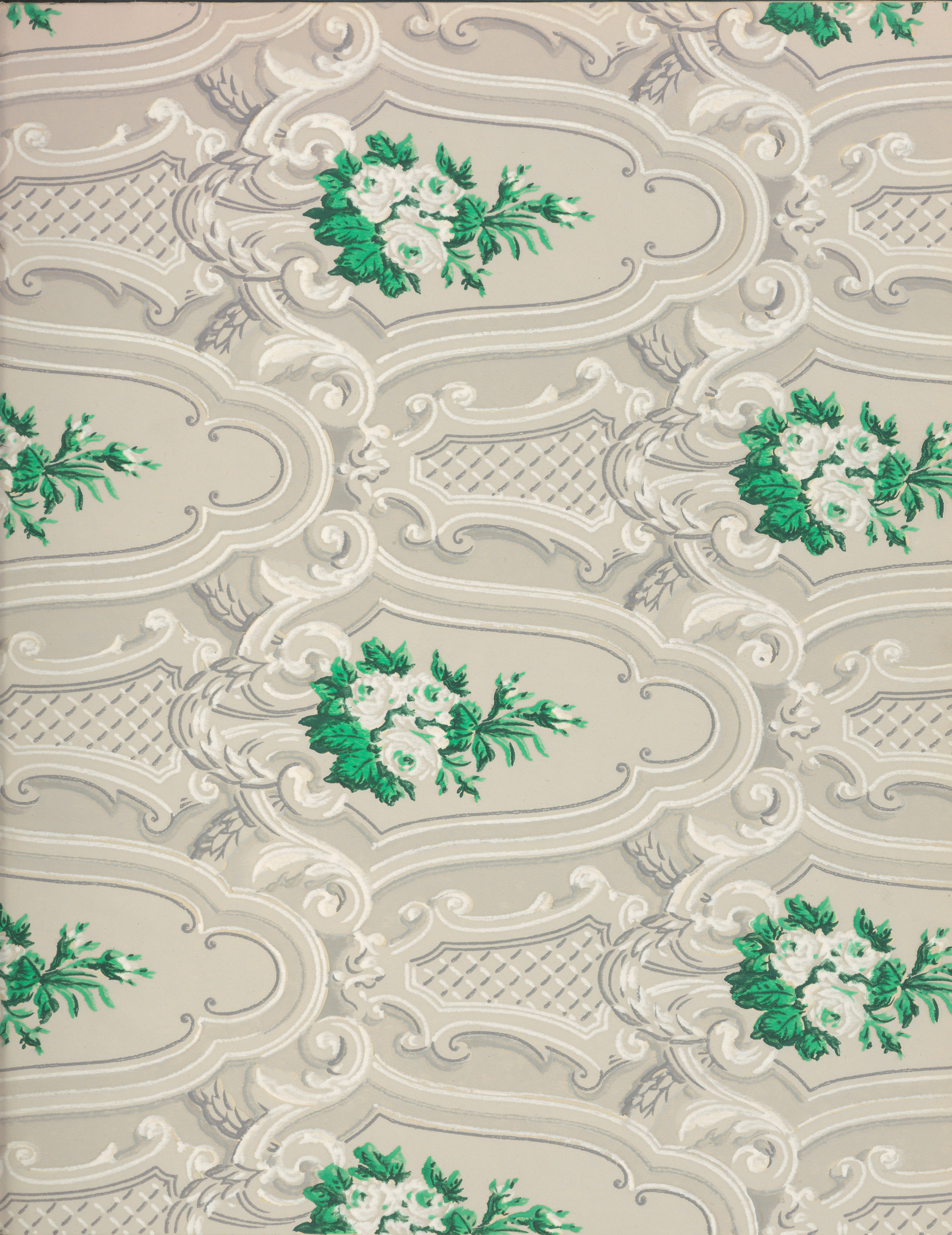
A wallpaper sample from Shadows from the Walls of Death

== See also ==
- Scheele's green
- Poison Book Project, an initiative aiming to identify and catalogue antique books containing hazardous substances such as arsenic
