= Antiques (magazine) =

- Editor: Mitchell Owens
- Categories: Arts
- Frequency: Bimonthly
- Founded: 1921 (first issue January 1922)
- Company: Magazine Antiques Media LLC
- Country: United States
- Based in: New York City
- Language: English
- Website: www.themagazineantiques.com

The Magazine Antiques is a bimonthly arts publication that focuses on architecture, interior design, and fine and decorative arts. Regular monthly columns include news on current exhibitions and art-world events, notes on collecting, and book reviews.

== History ==
Antiques was founded in 1921 by Homer Eaton Keyes, a noted collector of American glass and a former business manager of Dartmouth College, with its first issue appearing in January 1922. In the inaugural issue, Keyes wrote, "The magazine hopes to be authoritative... It hopes to avoid twaddle... The effort will be, in any one discussion, to secure thoroughness within a limited area of research."

"After seeing the initial copy the success of the magazine is not to be doubted," The Springfield Union stated in its 25 December 1921 issue (page 31). "It is most artistically set up and the lover of the antique will long to crawl into some chimneycorner and read it from cover to cover... It is the handiwork of a true lover of the antique.... Listed are some of the good things that the editors promise are coming: Arms, armor, books, bronzes, china, clocks, coins, draperies, etchings, fabrics, furniture, glassware, hardware, jewelry, laces, lamps, medals, paintings, pottery, porcelain, pewter, rugs, samplers, silverware, stamps, tapestries [and] wall coverings."

== Books ==
In 1947, editor in chief Alice Winchester edited the book Living with Antiques. (The News and Advance, 7 May 1947, page 10)

By 1950, The Magazine Antiques was heralded in the Los Angeles Times (10 September 1950, page 132) in an article written by Grace and Gregor Norman-Wilcox: "Many other magazines for collectors, serving different sorts of audiences, have come and gone, but Antiques in America, like the Connoisseur in England, has achieved a venerable, even a pontifical estate—not that of a magazine, but of an institution." That same year, the magazine published, under the aegis of editor Alice Winchester, The Antiques Book (A.A. Wyn, Inc.), a collection of articles that had appeared in the magazine between 1922 and 1949.

In 1951, Winchester wrote and published How to Know American Antiques, which reportedly sold 500,000 copies in the United States. In a review, Miss Winchester was described as having "made antiques come alive for thousands because of her firm belief that the history of a people can be read in their crafts and arts". (The Macon Telegraph, 4 February 1968, page 22)

In 1962, Winchester edited The Antique Treasury of Furniture and Other Decorative Arts, which was described as a "tour of seven 'living' American museums". (The Baltimore Sun, 5 November 1972, page 135)

In 1973, The Magazine Antiques published Living With Antiques: A Treasure of Private Homes in America, a 366-page compilation of 40 domestic interiors that had appeared in its pages.

== Miscellaneous ==
The head-of-title note "The Magazine" first appeared in January 1928, but was not used between August 1952 and February 1971.

The Magazine Antiques underwent a complete redesign in 2009.

== Statistics ==
The publication claims a print readership of 20,000, with 16,000 newsletter subscribers, and 7,800 monthly website uniques.

From 1929, the magazine was owned by philanthropist Dorothy Whitney Elmhirst, who moved the publication to New York City from Boston. Per the recollections of Alice Winchester, "I think she was rather proud of the magazine, and she enjoyed flipping it — through it, but she was not really interested in it. And, uh, the only reason she bought it was because she was urged to support her magazine on Asia".

In 1984, the magazine was purchased by Brant Publications, a company founded that same year by Peter M. Brant, a newsprint magnate and art collector. In 2016 The Magazine Antiques, along with ARTnews, Art in America and Modern Magazine, became acquired by Art Media Holdings.

== Editors in Chief ==
- Homer Eaton Keyes (1922-1939). As a newspaper noted, "Mr. Keyes said the habit of collecting was the greatest agency for good in nervous cases and advised it for those who are neurotic. A mutual interest in collecting also creates a 'cement' for family connections and makes a more contended [sic] relationship". (Keyport Enterprise, 4 July 1935, page 2)
- Alice Winchester (1939-1972), a pioneer historian of American folk art. "Good antiques don't collapse; that's one thing that makes them valuable", Winchester once said. "They are well made; they've lasted sometimes 200 years and they're good for a couple of hundred more. If an antique is in poor condition, it should be properly restored or used for kindling". (The Macon Telegraph, 4 February 1968, page 22)
- Wendell Garrett (1972-1990), later an appraiser on Antiques Roadshow He remained editor at large until his death in 2012. "Collect the things you like and the things you should know something about", he once said. "All we are are stewards — all we can do is to hold them for the next generation. After all, antiques aren't soybeans or pork bellies". (The Akron Beacon Journal, 11 October 1982)
- Allison Eckhardt Ledes (1990-2008) One of Ledes's lapidary comments was, "If I had to put my money in one place, I'd put it on the wall", referring to her passion for paintings. (The Berkshire Eagle, 16 June 1990)
- Elizabeth Pochoda (2008-2016), a former literary editor of The Nation, an editor at Vanity Fair, and executive editor of House & Garden.
- Gregory Cerio (2016-2024), a former senior features editor of House & Garden and the founding editor of Modern Magazine.
- Mitchell Owens (2024–September 2024), who had been American Editor of The World of Interiors, Decorative Arts Editor of Architectural Digest, and a reporter for The New York Times. A September 3 2024 update on the GoFundMe for Owens’ recovery states he is no longer Editor in Chief of the magazine Antiques
