= Charles F. Montgomery =

American art connoisseur, educator, and museum director

Charles Franklin Montgomery
- Born: April 14, 1910; Austin Township, Macon County, Illinois, US
- Died: February 21, 1978 (aged 67); New Haven, Connecticut, US
- Education: Harvard University (BA); Yale University (MA)
- Occupations: Art connoisseur, curator, art historian, scholar, educator, museum director
- Employer(s): Winterthur Museum, Garden and Library, Yale University
- Spouse: Florence M. Montgomery

Charles Franklin Montgomery (April 14, 1910 – February 21, 1978), was an American curator, art historian, scholar, educator, and museum director. He served as the first director of the Henry Francis du Pont Winterthur Museum, from 1954 to 1961. After continuing to work at the museum as a senior research fellow, he was a curator and art historian at Yale University from 1970 until his death.

== Career ==
Montgomery was born April 14, 1910, in Austin Township, Illinois, the son of William Norton and Grace Louisa (Albert) Montgomery. After receiving his BA degree from Harvard University in 1932, Montgomery worked for the Herald Tribune, purchased and unsuccessfully attempted to cultivate an orchard in Wallingford, Connecticut, and began collecting and selling antiques. His work as a dealer and consultant grew into a significant scholarly career.

In 1949, Montgomery was appointed associate curator and executive secretary of the Henry Francis du Pont Winterthur Museum; in 1954, he was appointed director of the Museum. He began teaching courses in the Winterthur Program in Early American Culture in 1952 and during the early years of the program was responsible for raising funds for fellowship grants. He remained part of the program until 1970. Under Montgomery's direction, Winterthur's graduate program was the first to offer professional training for careers in historic administration and historic house museums. He resigned as director in 1961 to focus on scholarship and teaching, working as a senior research fellow at Winterthur and teaching at the University of Delaware, where he was a lecturer from 1962 to 1967 and an adjunct professor from 1967 to 1970.

In 1970, Montgomery received an MA degree from Yale University and joined Yale as a curator and professor of art history. His Yale exhibitions included "American Art, 1750–1800: Towards Independence," a bicentennial exhibit that later traveled to the Victoria and Albert Museum. He had a particular interest in pewter, a subject on which he was an authority and "enthusiastic evangelist." His 1973 illustrated book, A History of American Pewter, serves as a concise introduction to the subject, but also touches upon broader themes in the study of decorative arts and social history.

Montgomery was a member of the editorial board of the American Walpole Society Notebook. He was elected to the Walpole Society (1955) and the American Antiquarian Society (1958).

The Decorative Arts Society offers an Award and Prize, named for Montgomery, that honor outstanding scholarly work on the decorative arts. Yale's History of Art Department includes a decorative arts professorship named for Montgomery.

== Personal life ==
Montgomery and his first wife, Evelyn Reed, spent the better part of a decade in Connecticut, attempting with little success to run an orchard. Montgomery's second wife and professional collaborator, Florence M. Montgomery, served as Winterthur's curator of textiles and a textile consultant for the Metropolitan Museum of Art. Montgomery had a son from each marriage; he and his second wife also had a daughter who died as a child.

Montgomery died of a heart attack shortly after collapsing in a Yale University classroom.

== Select bibliography ==
- Design and Decorative Arts of the Seventeenth and Eighteenth Centuries (1960)
- A Guide to the Winterthur Collections (1962)
- American Furniture: The Federal Period (1966)
- The History of American Pewter (1973)
