= Winterthur Museum, Garden and Library =

Museum and estate in Delaware, US

- U.S. National Register of Historic Places
- U.S. Historic district
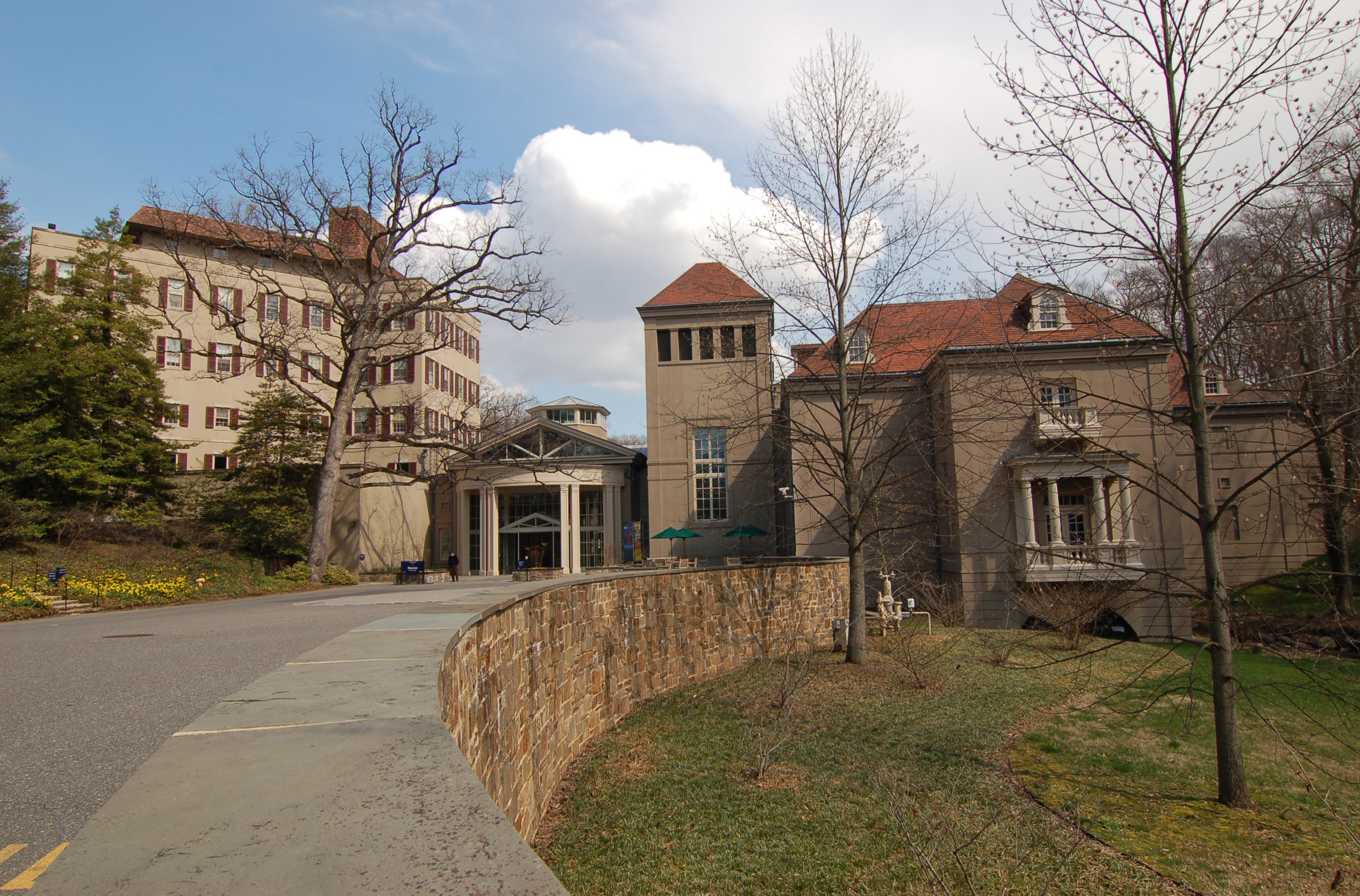
- The museum building

- Location within Delaware
- Location: Winterthur, Delaware, U.S.
- Nearest city: Wilmington, Delaware, U.S.
- Coordinates: 39°48′21″N 75°36′03″W
- Area: 979 acres (396 ha)
- Website: www.winterthur.org
- NRHP reference No.: 71000233
- Added to NRHP: February 24, 1971

Winterthur Museum, Garden and Library is an American estate and museum in Winterthur, Delaware. Winterthur houses one of the richest collections of Americana in the United States. The museum and estate were the home of Henry Francis du Pont (1880–1969), Winterthur's founder and a prominent antiques collector and horticulturist. Part of the natural area is old-growth forest and recognized by the Old-Growth Forest Network.

== History ==
=== Estate ===
The property where Winterthur sits was purchased by Éleuthère Irénée du Pont (E. I. du Pont) between 1810 and 1818 and was used for farming and sheep-raising. In 1837, E. I. du Pont's heirs sold 445 acres (180 ha) of the land to E. I. du Pont's business partner from France, Jacques Antoine Bidermann (1790–1865) and his wife Evelina Gabrielle du Pont (1796–1863) for the purpose of establishing their estate. Evelina was the second daughter of E. I. Du Pont's seven children. Between 1839 and 1842, the couple built a 12-room Greek revival manor house on the property and named their estate Winterthur after Bidermann's ancestral home in Winterthur, Switzerland. The Bidermanns added expansive gardens, livestock, and pastures.

After Bidermann's death, the property passed to his son, James Irénée, who then sold it to his uncle, Henry du Pont. Henry purchased the property for his son, Henry Algernon du Pont. Henry Algernon and his wife, (Mary) Pauline, settled at Winterthur in 1876 and enlarged the estate's existing home. Upon his father's 1889 death, Henry Algernon officially inherited the property and converted its main home to a French-style manor house. Between 1885 and 1925, Henry Algernon and Pauline added 900 acres (360 ha) to the property, which included pastures for Holstein cattle. After Pauline's 1902 death and the election of Henry Algernon to Congress, their son, Henry Francis (H. F.) du Pont, took over management of the estate.

H. F. married Ruth Wales in 1916. In 1923, the couple traveled to Vermont to study the cattle-breeding operation of William Seward Webb. During the trip, they visited the home of Webb's daughter-in-law, Electra Havemeyer Webb, a collector of American decorative arts. H. F. later stated that this was when he became interested in collecting American antiques. During the same trip, the du Ponts also visited interior decorator Henry Davis Sleeper. Sleeper's home was decorated with American antiques and interiors taken from other homes. This, too, inspired H .F. to start his own collection of Americana.

Henry Algernon died at the end of 1926, and Henry Francis du Pont officially inherited Winterthur in 1927. At the time, the estate consisted of 90 buildings and more than 2,600 acres (1,100 ha). H. F. and Ruth renovated Winterthur's manor, tripling its size. They outfitted the home with architectural elements salvaged from 17th, 18th, and 19th century American homes in the region, including wood interior paneling from the Grahame House, Belle Isle, and Mordington. Rooms in the home were themed by time period.

=== Museum ===
Winterthur has been called the "largest and richest museum of American furniture and decorative arts in the world." It was formerly known as Henry Francis du Pont Winterthur Museum and as the Winterthur Museum and Country Estate. H. F. established the main mansion as a public museum for American decorative arts in 1951 and moved to a smaller house on the estate. By 1959, the museum had been expanded to accommodate a library, lecture halls, and additional period rooms. By the time of his death in 1969, H. F. had amassed a collection of between 50,000 and 70,000 objects. This includes rare silver from Marquand and Co.

The museum comprises several buildings. In 1969, a large building that houses the library and conservation facilities was dedicated in honor of H. F.'s sister, a noted historic preservationist, and named the Louise du Pont Crowninshield Research Building. A pavilion building, separate from the main house, was built in the 1960s to welcome growing crowds. The visitor center consisted of a cafeteria and museum shop along with an adjacent parking lot. In 1992, additional galleries opened in a new building adjacent to the main house. The galleries host special rotating and permanent exhibits.

In 1987, Winterthur assistant curator Phillip H. Curtis was sentenced to a 7-year suspended prison sentence for stealing museum artifacts (ceramics, candlesticks, and other American decorative arts) worth $75,000. Curtis sold the stolen items to art dealers to fund his lavish lifestyle. In 1991, John Quentin Feller, a professor at the University of Scranton and authority on Chinese export ceramics, attempted to steal a Chinese serving platter from Winterthur, part of a series of thefts of 100 objects from 8 museums over 18 years. Feller was sentenced to 18 months in federal prison.

=== Directors ===
Winterthur Museum has been led by eleven executive directors since its founding: Joseph Downs (1951–1954), Charles Franklin Montgomery (1954–1961), Edgar Preston Richardson (1962–1966), Charles van Ravenswaay (1966–1976), James Morton Smith (1976–1984), Thomas Ashley Graves Jr. (1985–1992), Dwight Lanmon (1992–1999), Leslie Greene Bowman (1999–2008), David Roselle (2008–2018), Carol Cadou (2018–2021), and Chris Strand (2021–present). The current Charles F. Montgomery Director and CEO of Winterthur is Chris Strand, who previously served as Winterthur's Brown Harrington Director of Garden and Estate and as interim CEO in the months following Cadou's departure.

== Present day ==
=== Museum ===
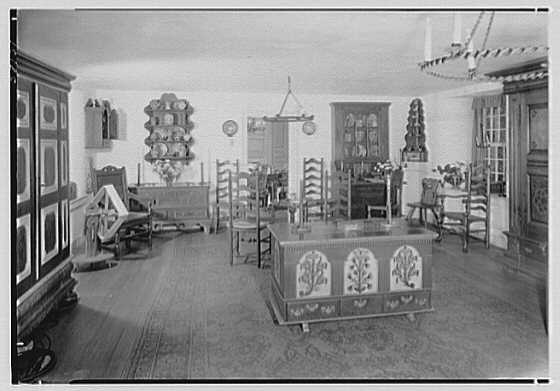
Winterthur Museum's Pennsylvania folk art room, c. 1950

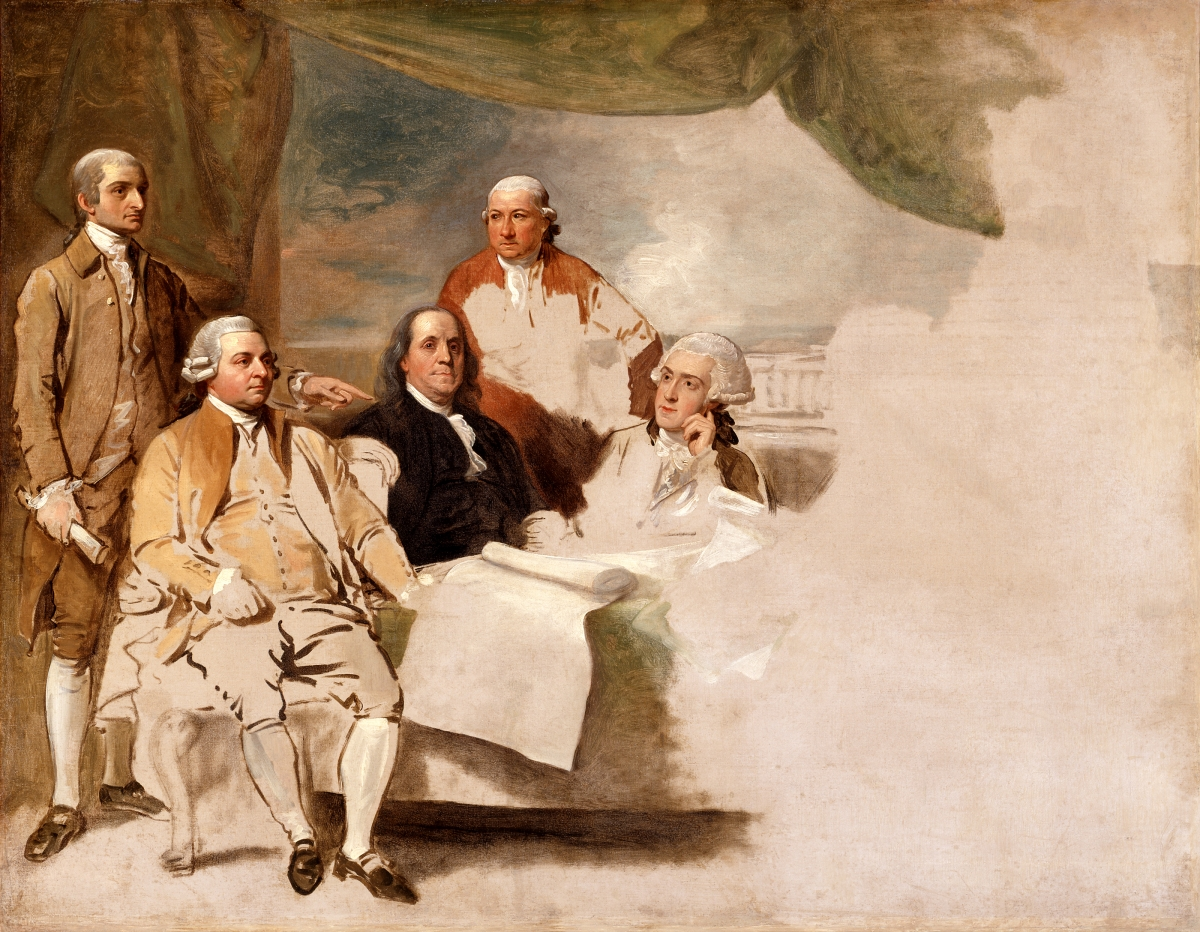
Treaty of Paris, a 1783 Benjamin West painting depicting (left to right): John Jay, John Adams, Benjamin Franklin, Henry Laurens, and William Temple Franklin at the signing of the Treaty of Paris in 1783

Winterthur is located in northwestern Delaware, 6 mi (10 km) north of Wilmington on Delaware Route 52. The museum and estate are situated on 979 acres (396 ha), near Brandywine Creek, with 60 acres (24 ha) of naturalistic gardens.

The museum contains 175 period-room displays and approximately 90,000 objects. Most rooms are open to the public on small, guided tours. The collection spans more than two centuries of American decorative arts, notably from 1640 to 1860, and contains some of the most important pieces of American furniture and fine art.

In 2002, the National Gallery of Art hosted a guest exhibition of 300 objects curated by Winterthur staff. Antiques Roadshow filmed the first three episodes of its 24th season at Winterthur in 2019.

=== Library ===
Established in 1952, the Winterthur Library holds more than 87,000 rare books and over 800,000 manuscripts and images. The Winterthur Library is free and open to the public by appointment. Holdings include rare books, periodicals, trade catalogs, manuscripts, ephemera, photographs, slides, paper art, the archives of the Winterthur estate and museum, and other resources that support the needs of researchers in American history, decorative arts, architecture, horticulture, and other subjects. The Joseph Downs Collection of Manuscripts and Printed Ephemera was established in 1955, and the Waldron Phoenix Belknap Jr. Research Library of American Painting was formed circa 1956. The Winterthur Archives, which includes many of the du Pont family's personal papers, Winterthur estate records, and H. F.'s history of collecting, was formed in 1969 after H. F.'s death.

The library's origins go back to Pierre Samuel du Pont, the family patriarch, who collected 8,000 books before his death in 1817. Ensuing generations of the family continued to grow the collection, with Henry Francis du Pont avidly acquiring rare books for display, particularly 17th-century and 18th-century books with old binding. By the 1940s, H. F. was building a scholarly research collection as part of his plan to transform Winterthur into a museum and teaching institution. Frank Sommer, the first library director, and museum curator Charles F. Montgomery intensified collection development ahead of the 1952 launch of Winterthur's first graduate program, in partnership with the University of Delaware. In 1969, the library moved from the main museum to the Crowninshield Research Building, which also houses extensive conservation, research, and education facilities.

=== Gardens and grounds ===
H. F. du Pont, a horticulturalist, began managing the estate's grounds in 1909. He contracted a landscape architect, Marian Cruger Coffin, to assist with the design of 70 acres (28 ha) of the estate's gardens and a model 2,400 acres (970 ha) farm. The estate had twelve temperature controlled greenhouses, a 23 acres (9.3 ha) orchard, a 5.5 acres (2.2 ha) vegetable garden, and a 4 acres (1.6 ha) cutting garden. It also had a butcher shop, a saw mill, a tannery, and a dairy where H. F. continued to breed and raise award-winning Holstein cattle. There are at least 6 garden follies throughout the grounds, which were featured in an exhibition that ran from 2018 to 2020. A narrated tram ride through the gardens is available from March through December.

One of the sources who inspired the landscaping at Winterthur was William Robinson, whose book The Wild Garden, published in 1870, recommended mixing large groupings of hardy plantings in natural landscapes. The colors of the plantings have been carefully selected, featuring hundreds of species and hybrid varieties of rhododendrons and azaleas, as well as peonies, forsythia, daffodils, lilacs, mountain laurel, and dogwood. The grounds also offer a pinetum with various types of conifers, such as firs, spruce and hemlocks.

Chandler Farm, a Federal-style historic house on the Winterthur grounds, is used as the home for the director and chief executive of Winterthur.

In 1991, Winterthur began offering paid internships for aspiring horticulturists and stewards of natural lands, who can reside temporarily on the Estate.

In 2002, Winterthur donated a conservation easement on its acreage to the Brandywine Conservation Trust, ensuring that the land would never be developed.

=== Graduate programs ===
Winterthur and the University of Delaware jointly founded and continue to offer two master's degree programs in American material culture (established in 1952 by museum director Charles F. Montgomery) and art conservation (established in 1974). As of August 1998, the programs had graduated 580 students, including 209 from the conservation program, which is one of only five graduate programs in the field in North America. The program is open to international students. The National Endowment for the Humanities has funded the program since 1974. Alumni include artists, curators, and scholars such as Wendell Garrett, Lorraine Waxman Pearce, Jessica Nicoll, Margaret Honda, Debra Hess Norris, and Charles L. Venable.

Winterthur offers residential, short-term, and remote fellowships, including postdoctoral, dissertation, and artist fellowships, to support researchers using the collections.

=== Journal ===
Since 1964, Winterthur has published a peer-reviewed interdisciplinary journal entitled Winterthur Portfolio: A Journal of American Material Culture and distributed by the University of Chicago Press. The journal is indexed in the MLA International Bibliography, Scopus, Web of Science, and other research databases.

== Display facilities ==
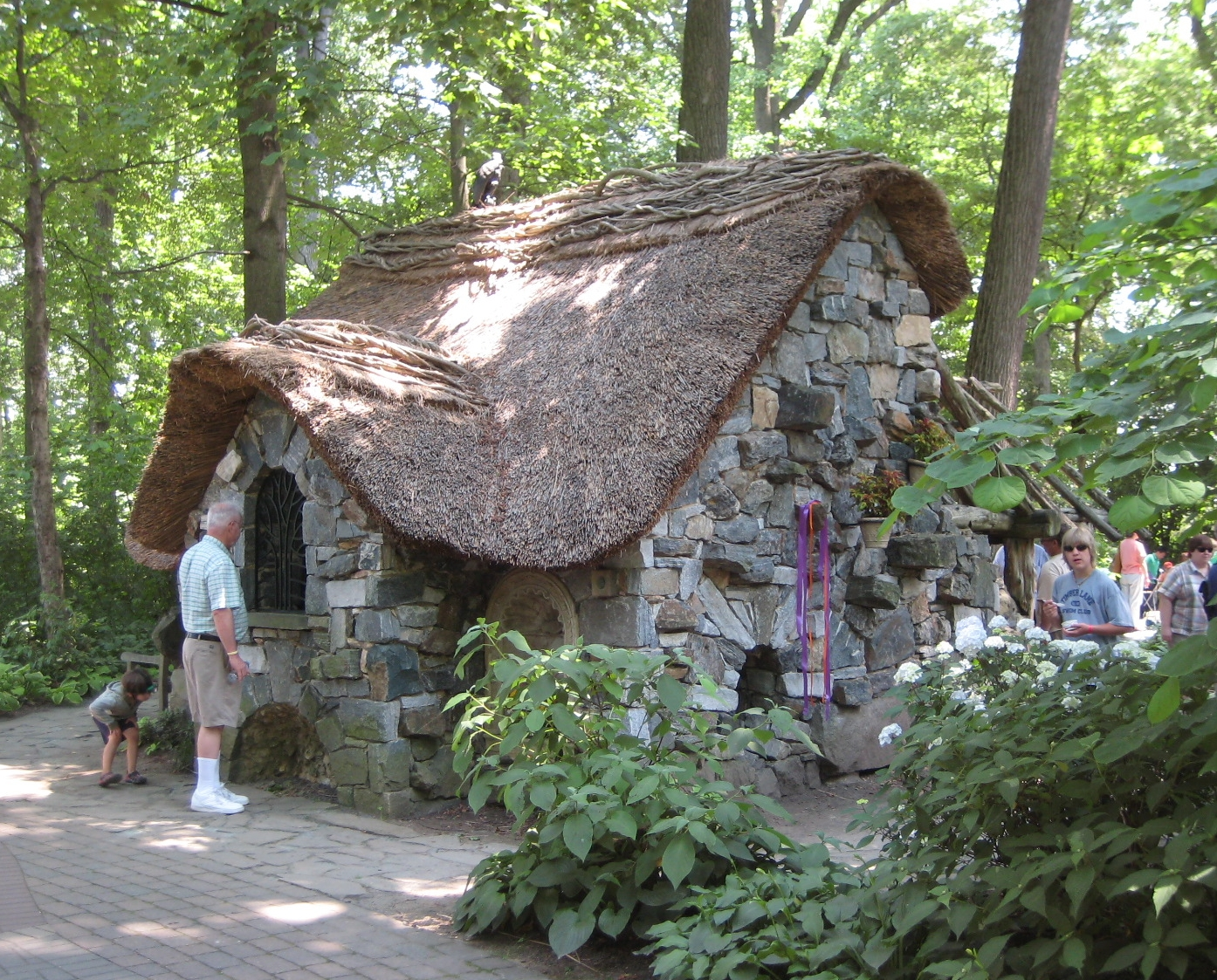
A stone cottage in the Enchanted Garden section of the grounds, opened in 2001 and intended for families with children

- Main museum (period rooms and offices), 96,582 sq ft (8,973 m^{2})
- The Cottage (home of H. F. du Pont after opening of the museum), 21,345 sq ft (1,983 m^{2})
- The Galleries 35,000 sq ft (3,252 m^{2}), 22,000 sq ft (2,044 m^{2}) display area
- Research Building 68,456 sq ft (6,360 m^{2})
- Visitors Center 18,755 sq ft (1,742 m^{2})

== See also ==
- National Register of Historic Places listings in northern New Castle County, Delaware
- List of botanical gardens and arboretums in the United States
- Largest historic homes in the United States
- List of museums in Delaware
- Hagley Museum and Library
- Longwood Gardens
- Nemours Estate
- Dominy craftsmen
- Poison Book Project
