= Phyllis Birkby =

American architect (1932–1994)

- Birkby in Wholeo, a stained glass dome by Caroling at 'The Farm Community'.
- Born: Noel Phyllis Birkby; December 16, 1932; Nutley, New Jersey, U.S.
- Died: April 13, 1994 (aged 61); Great Barrington, Massachusetts, U.S.
- Education: University of North Carolina at Greensboro; Cooper Union; Yale University

Noel Phyllis Birkby (December 6, 1932 – April 13, 1994) was an American architect, feminist, filmmaker, teacher, and founder of the Women's School of Planning and Architecture.

== Early life and education ==
Noel Phyllis Birkby was born in Nutley, New Jersey to Harold S. and Alice (Green) Birkby. As a child, she made drawings of cities and towns, and miniature three-dimensional environments in her mother's garden. An early fascination with architecture led her to express interest in the profession at the age of 16, to a career counselor who would tell her the profession was inaccessible to her, despite her aptitude: "Well, Miss Birkby, it appears that if you were a man, you should be studying architecture." In 1950, Birkby entered Women's College of the University of North Carolina in Greensboro, North Carolina to study fine art, and she was an active participant in extracurricular activities, such as Canterbury club and art club. She was considered a rabble rouser. In 1953, she was suspended in her senior year after an incident that purportedly involved drinking beer; she returned the following year to complete her studies, but was ultimately expelled. Birkby later attributed the outcome to her public expression of love for a classmate. "I wasn't hiding my love for another woman," she explained, "... didn't think there was anything wrong with it." After Birkby returned to her family home in New Jersey for a brief period of time, she moved to New York City.

In Manhattan, Birkby worked as a technical illustrator. In 1955, she traveled to Mexico with American Friends Service Committee to work on development projects with the Otomi people. A year later back in New York, another female architect encouraged Birkby to pursue professional education and training. In 1959, Birkby enrolled in the night school program of the Cooper Union School of Architecture, and she worked by day at the offices of architect Henry L. Horowitz, from 1960 to 1961, and Seth Hiller, from 1961 to 1963. In 1963, Birkby earned a Certificate in Architecture from Cooper Union, and she was awarded the Service to the School Awards by the Cooper Union Alumni Association for having demonstrated exemplary service and leadership during her time as student.

== Professional career ==
I have not by any means been a linear oriented professional person.

— Phyllis Birkby

Birkby enrolled in graduate school at Yale School of Architecture, and studied under the deanships of Paul Rudolph (chairman 1958–65), and Charles W. Moore (chairman 1965–1970), two renowned educators and leaders architect of the post-modern movement. At Yale, Birkby was one of six women enrolled in the department of architecture, among a student body of approximately 200 men. Birky would later say the gender gap compelled her to "rise above the female role" to prove she was as "good or better than the men." Birkby achieved a Masters of Architecture at Yale University in 1966, after completing a course of training and study, including her thesis on a physical education complex on Hofstra University.

On September 16, 1968, Birkby earned an architecture license in New York state. From 1966 to 1972, she was worked for the firm of Davis Brody and Associates, (later renamed Davis Brody Bond), during which time she contributed architecture services to many notable projects, including a new residential high-rise neighborhood on the East River in Manhattan called Waterside Plaza, a Library complex at Long Island University's Brooklyn Campus; New York City urban renewal projects in the South Bronx; Amethyst House, a women's residence commissioned by Bayley Seton Hospital, in Staten Island; and a recreational facility at Hampshire College.

Between 1968 and 1973, Birkby taught architectural design as a member of the faculty of the University of Detroit Mercy School of Architecture to hundreds of students, only a small number of whom were women. By that time, Birkby was a recognized architect but felt her professional life was discordant with the rest of her life. In 1973, Birkby came out publicly, resigned from her job at Davis Brody Associates, and traveled to Bien Hoa, Vietnam, with the firm Dober, Paddock, Upton and Associates, to work on a reconstruction plan for Thu Duc Polytechnic University. Upon returning to New York, Birkby opened her own private practice and taught architectural design at Pratt Institute School of Architecture from 1974 to 1978, New York Institute of Technology, and City College of New York. In 1973, Birkby co-edited a collection of essays, "Amazon expedition: A lesbian feminist anthology," which included radical feminist essays by Ti-Grace Atkinson, Esther Newton, Jill Johnston, and Bertha Harris, and that same year, she edited a compilation of participant statements at the October 14th World Fellowship in Kerhonkson, New York, entitled "Dealing With the Real World: 13 Papers by Feminist Entrepreneurs."

In the late 1970s, Birkby worked at the architectural offices of Gary Scherquist and Roland Tso in California, and she taught architecture and environmental design at Southern California Institute of Architecture, California State Polytechnic and University of Southern California. Throughout the 1970s, Birkby engaged and documented the significance of The Feminist Art Movement, including its slogan "the personal is political."

Returning to New York in the early 1980s, Birkby worked for Gruzen and Partners (later renamed Gruzen Sampton), from 1973 to 1981, and the architect Lloyd Goldfarb. Throughout the 1980s, Birkby taught building construction, design fundamentals, and architectural design at New York Institute of Technology.

Together with Leslie Kanes Weisman, Birkby coauthored the essays "A Women-Built Environment: Constructive Fantasies" (1975), "Women's Fantasy Environment: notes on a project in process" (1977), and "The Women's School of Planning and Architecture" (1983). Birkby described her methods of teaching in terms of "environmental activism" or the integration of environmentalism and architecture in a manner in which she learned at Yale University from Professor Serge Chermayeff, the author of several books, including Community and Privacy with Christopher Alexander (1964) and The Shape of Community with Alexander Tzonis (1971). Birkby taught her students practical techniques, such as a "bug listing" to denote the frustrating aspects of an environment, and also conceptual strategies like fantasy projection to encourage a thorough investigation into the social implications of form and design.

== Activism, architecture, and feminism ==
For Birkby, professional success required her to live a closeted life. After graduate school, she suffered from depression. During the late 1960s, she was introduced to feminism, which she had thought was "mostly about housewives in the suburbs." In this attitude, Birkby was like many bisexual and lesbian women of the period yet to find signs of a visible social justice movement, and put off by the mainstream women's movement. However, eventually she and Sidney Abbott, Kate Millett, Alma Routsong, and Artemis March were among the members of CR One, the first lesbian-feminist consciousness-raising group.

Beginning in 1971, Birkby became active in professional organizations for women in architecture and urban planning. Birkby also began documenting the women's movement in film, photography, oral history, and collected posters, manifestos, clippings, and memorabilia. After resigning from Davis Brody Associates, and coming out as a gay woman, Birkby opened her own private architecture practice and taught architecture design. In 1973, Birkby began to explore feminist theory in the context of contemporary architecture and teaching practices, and for example, she led a series of "environmental fantasy" workshops throughout the country, and Europe, to encourage women to imagine "their ideal living environment by abandoning all constraints and preconceptions."

These workshops were created with the intention to contrast the term Birkby coined, "patritecture" or the architecture of the patriarchy. Systems of domination are in place in the architecture of all buildings. Birkby wrote often about how even the architecture of structures are about power and domination over marginalized groups, especially women. In a 1981 article for Ms. Magazine, Birky wrote, "I am troubled that no matter how much rhetoric is expounded about equal rights and the full humanity of women, if the physical world we build does not reflect this, we speak in empty phrases." Her comparison goes as far as to say that the accommodation for women in physical spaces is just as important as physical violence against women. It is because of this that she started holding workshops, to have women explore spaces created by women for women. Birkby researched vernacular architectural created by women, some of which she later published.

In 1974, The New York Times architecture critic Ada Louise Huxtable published the American Institute of Architects (AIA)'s "appalling" statistics on national membership: 24,000 men and 300 women. By then, Birkby had become active in the feminist movement, defining herself as a lesbian, and joined "CR One," a Consciousness raising group composed of dynamic and radical theorists and writers, such as Kate Millett, Sidney Abbott, Barbara Love and Alma Routsong. As a member of "CR One," Birkby contributed to visible, activist projects, such as the homesteading a building at 330 East 5th Street, in the East Village section of Manhattan, to establish a temporary residence for women. That same year, Birkby joined forces with other trailblazing women architects, such as Judith Edelman, to create the Alliance of Women in Architecture in New York. A firebrand advocate, Edelman challenged the 1974 AIA national convention with the objectionable fact that women had only represented 1.2 percent of American registered architects.

An Architecture Symposium held at Washington University in St. Louis in 1974 became the inspiration for the Women's School of Planning and Architecture. The financial support for the symposium came from a grant from the United States Department of Housing and Urban Development, and sponsor organizations, including WSPA, American Indian National Bank, Coalition of 100 Black Women of D.C., Center for Community Change, Clearinghouse for Community Based Free Standing Educational Institutions, National Association of Community Cooperatives, National Congress of Neighborhood Women, National Council of Negro Women, National Hispanic Housing Coalition, Rural American Women, and the Southeast Women's Employment Coalition. Attendees left the event with a vision for a new educational organization led by women, for women, which would be a "free space for self-actualization of the students and the faculty," and not "one more place for the same old stuff."

=== The Women's School of Planning and Architecture (WSPA) ===
Founded in 1974, the Women's School of Planning and Architecture (WSPA) was established as a private, non-profit corporation, to provide an alternative, active learning experiences for women in the environmental and design fields, including architecture, planning, urban design, housing, neighborhood development, and construction, and co-founders Katrin Adam, Noel Phyllis Birkby, Ellen Perry Berkeley, Bobbie Sue Hood, Marie Kennedy, Joan Forrester Sprague, and Leslie Kanes Weisman endeavored to organize women to focus on "shared common goals and interest not being met within the existing professional contexts." A decade ahead of the country's Active learning initiatives, WSPA was established as a nontraditional, non-hierarchical, participatory, experiential education program, in which participants were "equally responsible and equally capable of making a contribution." WSPA was open to any woman interested in the built environment, regardless of academic background or training. Birkby described WSPA in the essay entitled "Herspace" (1981), published in the Heresies issue "Making Room: Women and Architecture." The title of Birkby's essay expands upon the term "Herstory" used during the 1970s women's movement to emphasize the need to reclaim and document women's place in "His-story" - the documentation of the past by men about the accomplishments of men.

WSPA encouraged personal, professional, and social growth and change. Two-week summer sessions took place at Saint Joseph's College, Biddeford, Maine (1975); Stevenson College, Santa Cruz, California (1976); Roger Williams College, Bristol, Rhode Island (1978), Work Places and Dwellings: Implications for Women; and Regis College, Denver, Colorado (1979). The 1980 program at Hood College in Frederick, Maryland was cancelled due to low enrollment. WSPA hosted a national women's symposium "Community-Based Alternatives and Women in the Eighties," on May 17–20, 1981, at American University in Washington, DC. The event focused on women in the areas of housing, employment, economic development, education and cooperative development. Despite ongoing efforts, WSPA's final project was a 1983-1984 Design Arts Grant from the National Endowment for the Arts (NEA) for "Architectural Quality in Urban Homesteading," a project with a stated aim to help urban homesteaders, many of whom where women, "achieve architectural quality in buildings rehabilitated and cooperatively owned and managed by homesteaders through a participatory design process."

WSPA programming focused on reforming the design professions to include women. Courses like "Demystification of Tools in Relation to Design" taught by Katrin Adam, emphasized practical skills, and courses such as "Women and the Built Environment: Personal, Social, and Professional Perceptions," taught by Birkby and others, encouraging women to consider broader issues of significance to women in built and symbolic environments. The participants who brought children to the two-week program where provided with childcare arranged through a work study program on each campus. A 1983 essay The Women's School of Planning and Architecture in "Learning Our Way: Essays in Feminist Education"(1985), ed. Charlotte Bunch and Sandra Pollack (Trumansburg, New York: The Crossing Press), authored by Leslie Kanes Weisman, describes the Women's School of Planning and Architecture as an ideal product of its time for "the consciousness-raising task of defining problems."

== Later life and legacy ==
As the feminist movement began to wane, in the late 1970s, Birkby's focused on teaching and feminist architecture studies and conferences. The Women's School of Planning and Architecture closed and Birkby went on to teach architecture at Long Island and City University of New York. She was a member and held conferences for the Organization of Lesbian and Gay Architects and Designers in New York (OLGAD). In 1992 she was diagnosed with breast cancer. A memorial and exhibit of her work was organized by OLGAD members and held at Kate Millett's loft in New York City, attended by most of the seminal East Coast lesbian feminists. In the final stage of illness, Birkby was cared for by a friends who called themselves the "Sisters of Birkby." On April 13, 1994, Birkby died in Great Barrington, Massachusetts. A memorial to Noel Phyllis Birkby at Orient Cemetery, Suffolk County, New York reads Courage.

Following Birkby's death in 1994, Smith College in Northampton, Massachusetts, hosted a two-day exhibition entitled "'Amazonian Activity': a Celebration of the Life of Noel Phyllis Birkby" (1997) on the occasion of the opening of the Noel Phyllis Birkby Papers, bequeathed to the Sophia Smith Collection. Sherrill Redmon, collections director, organized the event. A symposium entitled "Radical Feminism and Lesbian Culture in the 1970s and Today" included women's movement activists: Sidney Abbott, coauthor of "Sappho Was a Right-On Woman"; Bertha Harris, author of "Lover"; Kate Millett, author of "Sexual Politics"; and Alma Routsong, author of Patience and Sarah, published under pen name Isabel Miller.

Throughout the 1970s to 1990s, Birkby produced photographs, audio and video recordings, and over 150 silent films on the women's movement, gay and lesbian activism, and lesbian culture in New York City. The films also documented Birkby's architecture, personal life, and travel, are included in her collections at Smith College.

== Personal life ==
While living in New York in the 1950s and 1960s, Birkby had relationships with various artists and writers, including Yvonne Jacquette, Bertha Harris, Alberta Ming-Chi Wang, Louise Fishman, and Frederica Leser.

== See also ==
- LGBTQ architectural contributions
