= Patience and Sarah (opera) =

Opera

- Opera by Paula M. Kimper
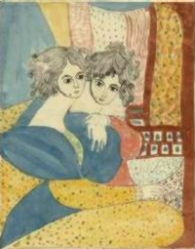
- Painting by Mary Ann Willson, who inspired the novel and the opera
- Librettist: Wende Persons
- Language: English
- Based on: Patience and Sarah by Isabel Miller
- Premiere: 8 July 1998; Lincoln Center

Patience and Sarah is a 1998 opera by Paula M. Kimper. The libretto is by Wende Persons, based on the novel of the same name by Isabel Miller. It has been described as the first lesbian opera and as the first mainstream gay-themed opera.

== History ==
Persons began writing the libretto in 1981, after a lesbian opera singer, upon whom Persons had a crush, mentioned that she had trouble identifying with the straight characters she played. "She never got to be who she really was and sing of her love for women," Persons says. "I thought about it and said to myself, wouldn't it be great to do this?" Having read a lot of lesbian literature that ended unhappily, Persons was drawn to Miller's happy ending for the two women. She finished the first draft in three weeks in order to impress the singer. In 1989, she asked her then-partner Kimper to collaborate; Kimper, a composer of incidental stage music and film scores, initially refused, but reconsidered after seeing a performance of the Ring Cycle at the Metropolitan Opera in 1993. Miller gave the pair permission to adapt her novel as an opera, and signed over the rights shortly before she died in 1996.

Kimper and Persons cite Richard Strauss as an influence, and mention that their wish to make the opera "economically viable to produce" led to their choice of a small orchestra and no chorus.

The opera was formally commissioned by American Opera Projects, which presented readings of the work in development from 1994 to 1996. A semi-staged final version, accompanied by piano, was performed in July 1996.

Patience and Sarah premiered on July 8, 1998, as part of the Lincoln Center Festival. Steven Osgood conducted the chamber orchestra, Douglas Moser directed, and Marie Anne Chiment designed the sets and costumes. Some of the cast members were those from the 1996 semi-staged version, including Lori Ann Phillips and Elaine Valby as the title pair, though John G. Bellemer replaced Michael Hendrick as Edward White. Many lesbians, who unlike gay men are not known for opera patronage, attended, as well as other first-time operagoers. The premiere coincided with a display at the American Folk Art Museum of the art of Mary Ann Willson, on whose story the novel was based.

The opera has been performed a number of times, in full stagings or in excerpts, in other locations. Laure Meloy, who premiered the role of Rachel, has often sung Patience in these performances and concerts. "I Want To Live," Patience and Sarah's Act II duet, appears on Lesbian American Composers, the third album in Composers Recordings, Inc.'s "Gay American Composers" series.

Patience and Sarah was revived in 2016 as part of New York Pride, with a reduced orchestration by the composer. Kimper said that the new orchestration "might make it more accessible to colleges and theatres and other alternative venues besides opera houses."

== Roles ==
Role	Voice type	Premiere cast, July 8, 1998 (Conductor: Steven Osgood)
Patience White	soprano	Lori Ann Phillips
Sarah Dowling	mezzo-soprano	Elaine Valby
Parson Daniel Peel, an itinerant bookseller	tenor	Barton Green
Edward White, Patience's brother	tenor	John G. Bellemer
Martha White, his wife	contralto	Amy Ellen Anderson
Pa Dowling, Sarah's father	bass	LeRoy Lehr
Ma Dowling, Sarah's mother	mezzo-soprano	Janet Ellis
Rachel Dowling, Sarah's younger sister	soprano	Laure Meloy

== Synopsis ==
The plot of the opera follows that of the novel fairly closely, with the wealthy and well-educated Patience and the poor farmer's daughter Sarah falling in love and sharing their dreams of leaving Connecticut to go pioneering. Their families prevent their leaving together, with Sarah's father beating her, but Sarah disguises herself as a boy and travels with Parson Peel, who falls in love with her before she reveals herself as a woman. Sarah returns, and after Patience's brother demands the two leave his home, they set out to start a farm and a life together, and sing a final duet on the dock. (The novel ends slightly later, after the voyage and the establishment of the farm.)

== Reception ==
Reactions to the opera have been mostly positive. Reviewing the 1996 performance for the New York Times, Allan Kozinn described Kimper's score as "accessible, attractively lyrical," noting that it drew on hymn tunes and parlor songs but also contained impressionistic influences. Anthony Tommasini of the Times, reviewing the 1998 premiere, criticized Kimper's Romantic touches and said that the opera's "strongest musical moments were when it sounded like [the folk opera Kimper described it as], especially the set-piece hymns and songs." James Jorden compared the music to The Ballad of Baby Doe and the work of Virgil Thomson, and said that Kimper set the libretto "great sensitivity to the cadences of natural speech." Kozinn and Jorden both observed that the opera was too long. Persons's libretto was generally viewed favorably. Specific excerpts that drew praise were Sarah's "gorgeous, Ravelian aria" in Act II and "a charming and dramatically sensitive setting of the Lord's Prayer and a tear-jerking ballad for the lovesick Parson." "I Want To Live" was also described as having "Ravel-like harmonies."

== See also ==
- Fellow Travelers (opera)
- Harvey Milk (opera)
