= LGBTQ architectural contributions =

Impacts of queer people on architecture

LGBTQIA+ architectural contributions refer to the history and presence of lesbian, gay, bisexual, transgender, queer, intersex, and asexual individuals and communities within the field of architecture. The topic highlights the work of architects, designers, and communities whose identities and experiences have shaped the built environment in distinct ways. Scholars and historians have examined how architecture can reflect, accommodate, or challenge cultural understandings of gender and sexuality across different historical periods.The 1970s was a monumental time period for building queer, lesbian, and feminist spaces. Architectural advancements of the 19th-20th century built spaces that offered new opportunities to disrupt sexual divisions of labor and gendered norms. From ancient examples associated with personal expression and patronage to modern and contemporary movements informed by queer theory, the relationship between LGBTQIA+ identity and architecture continues to evolve. This topic summarizes the current scholarly understanding of “queer architecture,” its history, and its future.

The contributions of LGBTQ individuals to architecture have been documented across a wide range of historical and cultural contexts. Although the relationship between sexuality and architectural style remains a topic of scholarly discussion, researchers have examined how queer people design, inhabit, and reinterpret architectural spaces. These studies explore how built environments can reflect social and cultural dynamics related to identity, visibility, and inclusion.

LGBTQ contributions to architecture encompass a broad spectrum of design practices, from expressive and experimental approaches to those aligned with mainstream movements. Historical figures such as Horace Walpole and William Beckford have been associated with ornate and theatrical styles, while others, including Charles Robert Ashbee, worked within established traditions like the Arts and Crafts movement. Scholars note that focusing exclusively on overtly “flamboyant” aesthetics risks reinforcing stereotypes and overlooking the diversity of LGBTQ architects and designers.

Limited demographic data on LGBTQIA+ professionals within architecture presents an ongoing challenge for understanding representation and equity in the field. National datasets such as the U.S. Census do not currently collect information on sexual orientation or gender identity, and professional organizations including NCARB and NAAB provide little disaggregated data. This absence of metrics makes it difficult to evaluate inclusivity and address structural barriers within the profession.

While the concept of a distinct "queer architecture" remains a matter of scholarly debate, it is evident that architectural forms have responded to the shifting relationship between LGBTQ individuals and broader societal structures. The built environment has served as a means of negotiating identity, privacy, and visibility, providing spaces that reflect the tensions between societal pressures and personal expression. Whether through overtly dramatic designs or more subtle adaptations, architecture has offered LGBTQ individuals both refuge and resistance in the face of a hostile environment.

== Influence on architecture and subverting function of form ==
=== Ancient Rome ===
Antinous, a youth from Bithynia, became the beloved of Roman Emperor Hadrian (r. 117-138 CE) around 123 CE. Their relationship was rooted in the Greek tradition of erastes and eromenos, where an older man (erastes) took on an educational and affectionate role toward a younger man (eromenos). Hadrian, known for his preference for male lovers, brought Antinous into his circle and educated him both socially and intellectually. The bond between them had a profound impact on Hadrian's personal life and, later, on his architectural endeavors.

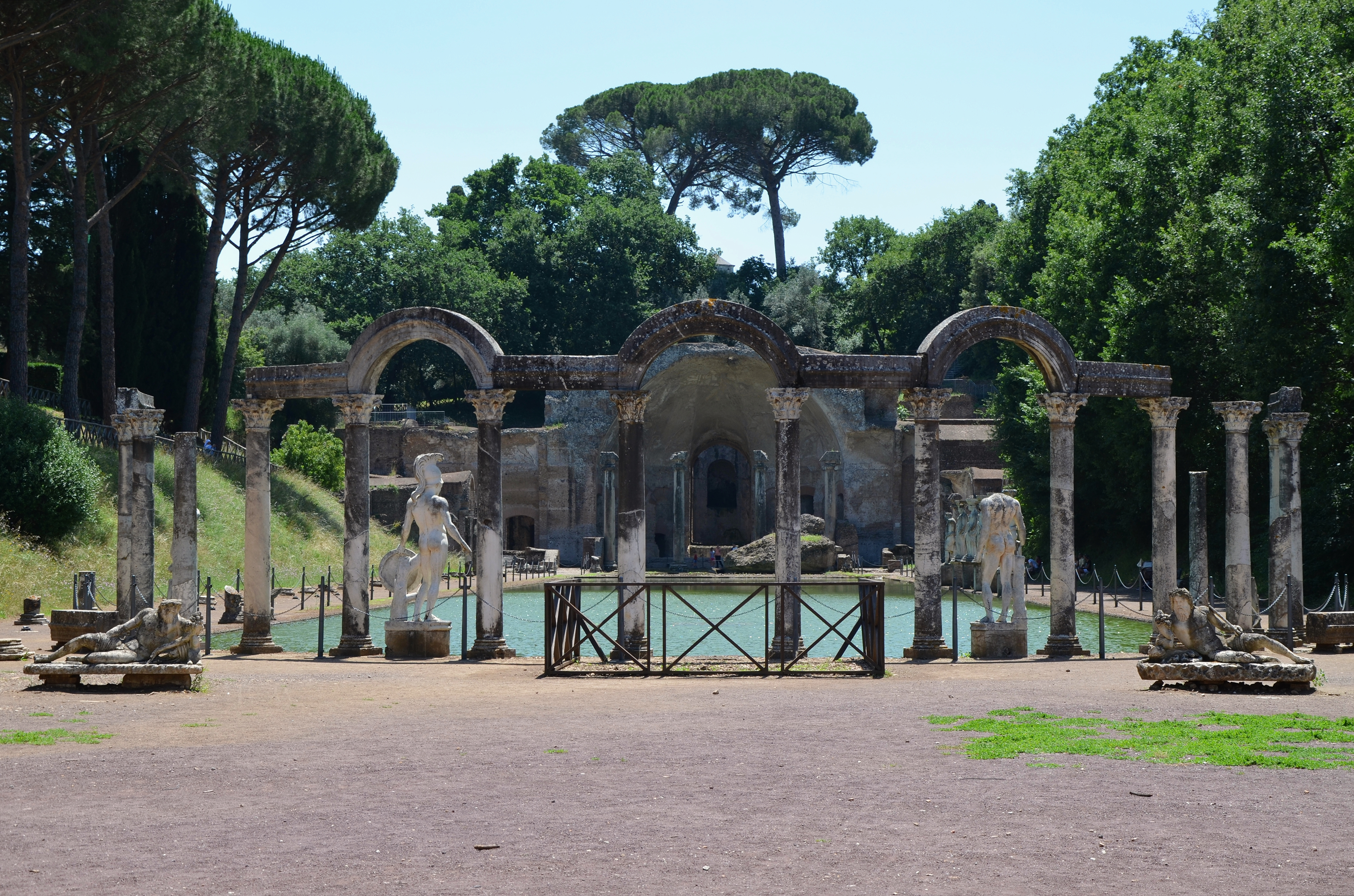
The Canopus at Hadrian's Villa, Tivoli

After Antinous' death in 130 CE, Hadrian, deeply affected, commissioned the construction of a city in his lover's honor, Antinopolis, near Hermopolis in Egypt. Modeled after Alexandria, the city's layout and the surrounding monuments reflected Hadrian's desire to immortalize Antinous. The city served not only as a tribute to his lover but also as a means of asserting his personal connection to the divine, as Antinous was deified following his death.

The cult of Antinous spread rapidly throughout the Roman Empire, establishing temples, altars, and statues in his honor. This cult, associated with healing powers, also symbolized the intersection of sexuality and religion in Roman society. Antinous was venerated as a god who, having once been mortal, could empathize with human suffering. His statues were focal points of worship, often receiving daily offerings and being treated with the same reverence as other deities.

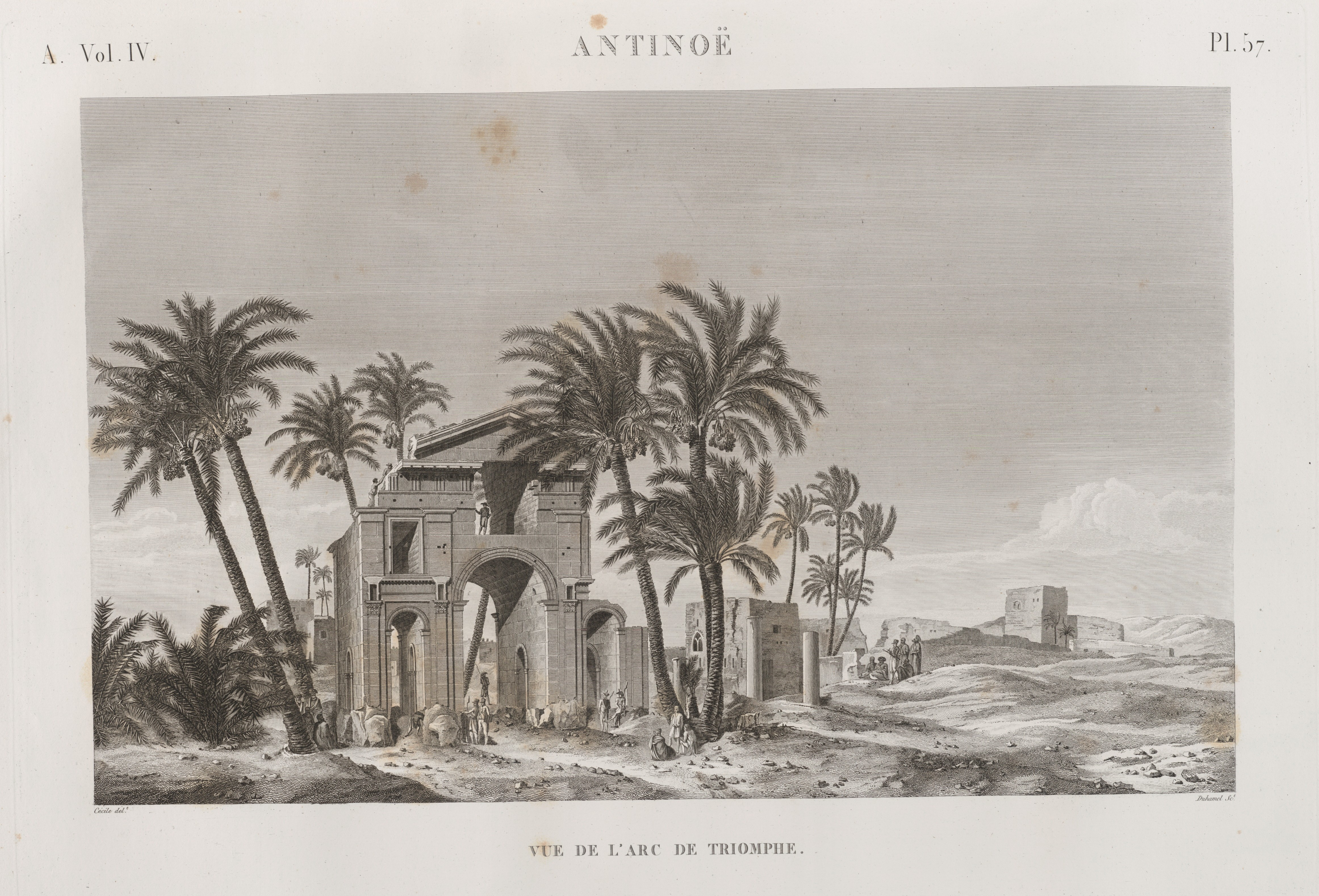
Antinoöpolis: 19th century AD view of the triumphal arch, from Description de l'Égypte.

However, the rise of Christianity led to resistance against the cult of Antinous, as Christian writers condemned it as immoral. Despite this, the cult persisted until it was officially outlawed by Emperor Theodosius I in 391 CE. Through the architectural projects he initiated in Antinous' name, Hadrian's sexuality and personal relationships left a lasting imprint on the built environment, reflecting how personal affection and sexuality could shape public life in ancient Rome.

=== "Queer" Gothic architecture ===
The late 18th and early 19th-century Gothic style, particularly as exemplified by William Beckford and Horace Walpole, has been the subject of queer architectural analysis. Both Beckford and Walpole were key figures in the development of eccentric, fantastical architectural forms that blended personal identity with artistic expression. Their works, while rooted in Gothic aesthetics, reflect a broader social and cultural queerness, evident in their social circles and artistic endeavors.

=== "Queer" Modern architecture ===
LGBTQ artists and designers made pivotal contributions to 20th-century English modernism, with figures such as Enid Marx and interior designers featured in Vogue magazine playing central roles in defining a distinctive modernist aesthetic. The so-called "Amusing style," characterized by playful, whimsical, and gender-fluid design elements, challenged conventional gender norms and social expectations, reflecting broader shifts in cultural attitudes toward gender and identity during the interwar period. The design of St Ann's Court by architect Christopher Tunnard and his partner Gerald Schlesinger exemplifies the ways in which LGBTQ individuals navigated societal homophobia during the early 20th century. Completed in 1937, the building incorporates features such as retractable screens in the master bedroom, allowing the couple to conceal their relationship from the public eye. This architectural response to social hostility highlights how design can accommodate both the desire for privacy and the need to navigate a homophobic society.

=== Strawberry Hill's theatrical design ===
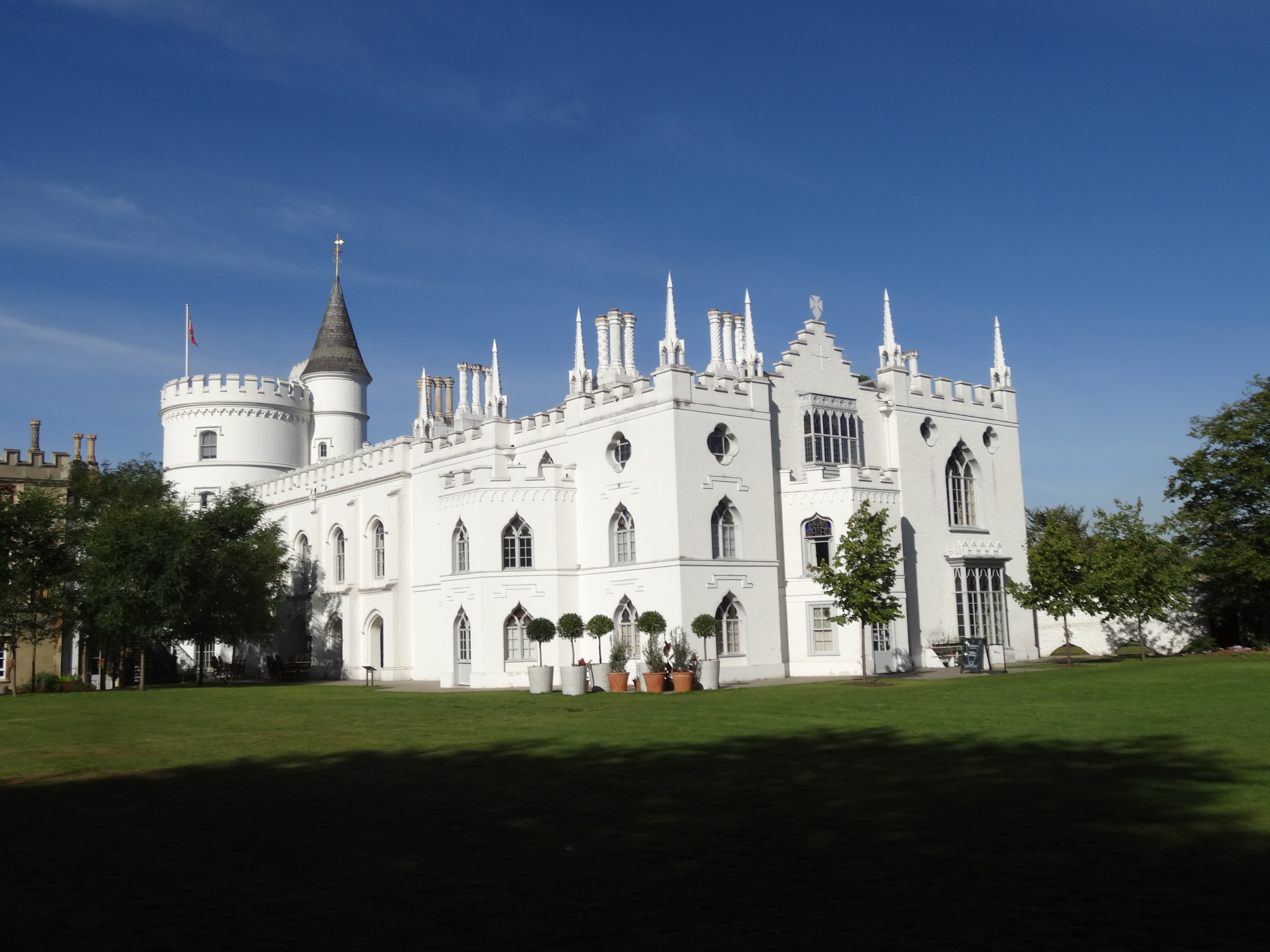
Strawberry Hill House 2018 post restoration.

Walpole's Strawberry Hill serves as an important case study in how architecture can reflect the social dynamics and personal identities of its creator. The building's whimsical Gothic Revival style, characterized by theatrical and elaborate features, provided a setting for exclusive same-sex social gatherings. The space functioned as both a public display and a private retreat, illustrating how architectural design could serve as a subtle form of resistance to prevailing societal norms. Horace Walpole's Strawberry Hill (created from 1747-1777) was noted to consist of elements with erotic nature in which Walpole expressed his true identity. The property was not solely designed and created by Horace Walpole himself; he received assistance from his friends John Chute, Richard Bentley, and Robert Adam who were notable architects or designers. The interior was decorated with a variety of media that fused elements Gothic and Chinese styles into one comprehensive and captivating style. Strawberry Hill served as a private and safe space where Walpole and friends could showcase their true identities without fear of judgment.

=== Beckford's Fonthill Abbey ===
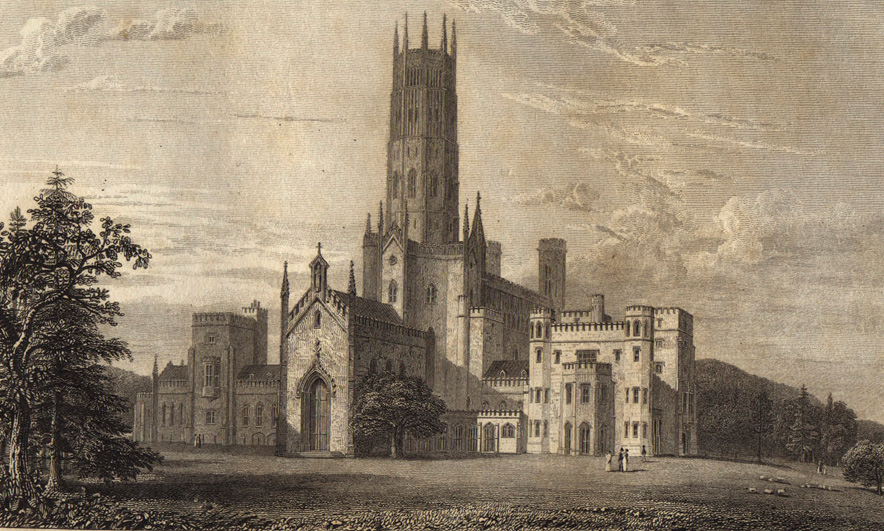
Fonthill Abbey South West view edited

William Beckford's Fonthill Abbey, begun in 1796, represents an extravagant and highly personal interpretation of Georgian 'Gothick' architecture. Its excessive and ambitious design, particularly the 276-foot-high tower, epitomized Beckford's unique vision but also resulted in structural instability. Viewed through a modern lens, the building can be considered an example of 'camp'—intentionally exaggerated, self-aware, and theatrical architecture, marking a departure from the more scholarly Gothic Revival of the period.

=== Anne Lister's Shibden Hall ===
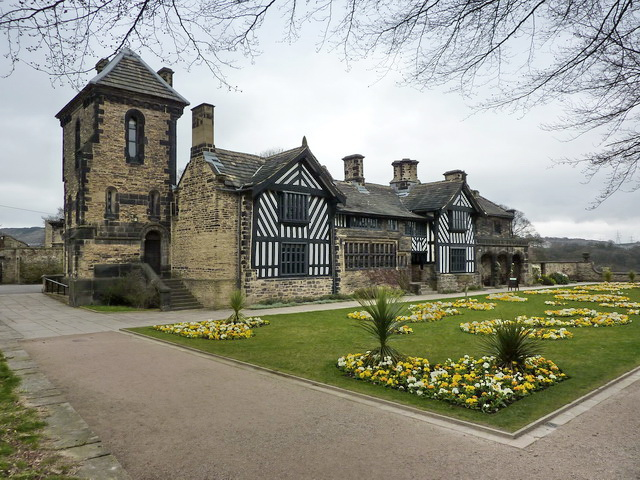
Shibden Hall, Halifax

The remodeling of Shibden Hall by Anne Lister offers a notable example of subversive queer architecture. Lister's modifications, which included the addition of a Gothic tower and library, reflected her need to balance societal expectations of respectability with her desire for personal privacy. Inspired in part by the Ladies of Llangollen's Plas Newydd, Lister's architectural choices demonstrate how design can navigate the complex intersection of public persona and private identity, offering a space for both social engagement and seclusion.

== Feminist and LGBTQ architects ==
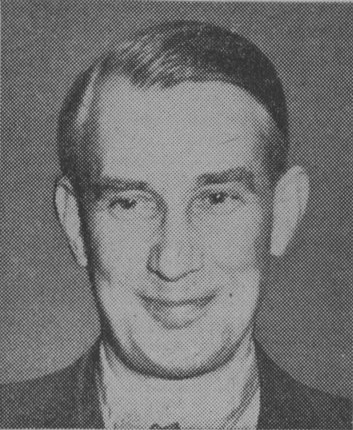
Architect Sven Ivar Lind, designer of the Marieberg collective house

In Sweden in 1944, architect Sven Ivar Lind built the Marieberg collective house which served as a commune for working women and their families. Lind constructed the collective as a means to disrupt the sexual divisions of labor and gendered norms. These sexual divisions occurred within the home where women were societally expected to uphold motherly duties, tend to their husband, and care for the house without wages. The Marieberg collective house paid women to complete housework tasks that were previously deemed the "women's work" which were typically done in private, without earning wages (i.e. cooking, cleaning, etc.). This commune changed these sexual divisions of labor by paying the women to complete these formerly unpaid tasks. Because the Marieberg collective house provided a variety of jobs, it offered families childcare and food while the women worked.

Noel Phyllis Birkby (1932-1994) was a feminist and lesbian-identifying architect who aimed to reinvent and redefine women's private and public spaces to break down society's enforced gendered roles. Birkby aimed to create spaces that eliminated the public-private divide of gender roles. She obtained architectural inspiration by holding 'environmental fantasy workshops' where she encouraged women to utilize imagination as a means of creativity in designing their ideal private homes and institutional buildings through drawings. Birkby would then analyze these drawings to identify and evaluate the locations in which gender divisions occurred most prominently (in regard to private-public spaces). In 1971, Birkby co-founded the program Women's School of Planning and Architecture (WSPA), located in Maine. During these programs, attendees (who were strictly women) lived together in a commune. Historian Stephen Vider described Birkby's work to "focus on women but [it] ultimately encompassed people who were poor, elderly, and disabled."

== Literature focused on LGBTQ architecture and design ==
Queer Space: Architecture and Same-Sex Desire by Aaron Betsky argues that queer spaces subvert traditional architectural forms, which often uphold heteronormative societal structures. This subversion manifests in the adaptive reuse of spaces, such as transforming bathhouses or dance clubs into sites of liberation and self-expression. These venues are not merely functional; they symbolize the rejection of rigid boundaries and linear designs in favor of fluidity, openness, and unpredictability—reflecting queer identities.

A central theme in Betsky's analysis is the transient and performative quality of queer spaces. He describes spaces like nightclubs and cruising grounds as "queer architectures" because they are less about permanence and more about experiences and interactions. For example, the design of gay clubs prioritizes sensory engagement—through dramatic lighting, mirrored surfaces, and flexible layouts—emphasizing movement and transformation rather than static functionality. This focus on temporality mirrors the precarious place of queer communities within broader social structures.

Betsky's work highlights how queer spaces often dissolve traditional divisions between public and private realms. Parks, alleys, and other urban landscapes become sites of intimacy and exploration, repurposed to meet the needs of queer individuals. Similarly, domestic spaces, such as the homes used for underground drag balls, take on public functions, fostering community and collective identity. This blurring of boundaries reflects a rejection of fixed spatial norms in favor of fluidity and adaptability. Betsky also examines how gay communities have reshaped urban environments, turning marginalized neighborhoods into vibrant cultural centers. Spaces like New York's Fire Island, San Francisco's Castro District, and the underground ballroom scenes exemplify how queer individuals reimagine urban landscapes. Through both physical and symbolic transformations, these spaces serve as sites of resistance, solidarity, and visibility, challenging the invisibility imposed by mainstream architectural practices.

Betsky's notion of "queering" architecture extends beyond physical spaces to the reimagining of design principles. He critiques traditional architecture for its rigidity and argues that queer design practices emphasize fluidity, ambiguity, and subversion. This ethos is evident in spaces like the Haus of Gaga (Named in reference to contemporary artist Lady Gaga and the BauHaus ), where flamboyant design elements and playful reinterpretations of conventional forms create environments that celebrate queerness as an aesthetic and political stance.

== Defining LGBTQ architecture through a sociological lens ==
LGBTQ Queer architecture refers to the study and interpretation of how architectural spaces relate to sexuality, gender, and identity. The term emerged in the 1990s through the work of scholars such as Aaron Betsky and Beatriz Colomina, who explored how built environments can express or mediate experiences of same-sex desire and non-normative identities. Academic discussions of queer architecture emphasize that it is not a distinct stylistic movement, but rather a critical framework for reading and designing space. Through this perspective, scholars examine how architecture shapes, reflects, and sometimes challenges heteronormative social structures by addressing issues of privacy, visibility, and inclusion. Queer theory in architecture therefore extends beyond questions of ornament or form, focusing instead on spatial experience, social practice, and identity within the built environment.

Subsequent study has expanded these ideas to include contemporary and global perspectives on how queerness interacts with architectural production and occupation. Recent research emphasizes that “queering” architecture involves rethinking current "masculinist" organizations of space to create an architecture that accommodates relationships and diverse individuals. Examples often cited in the queer social context include adaptive reuse for LGBTQ community spaces, artistic interventions such as Gordon Matta-Clark’s Day’s End, and inclusive design approaches that make gender-neutral or flexible spatial arrangements possible. Collectively, these works demonstrate how architecture can be “queered” not by appearance or style but by its capacity to question normative assumptions about space, identity, and belonging.

=== Social practice and LGBTQ architecture ===
In terms of architectural space, current study takes a sociological approach to understanding how space can reinforce a particular lifestyle or set of life circumstances. Sociologist Samuel L. Perry references the family structure as a means of understanding a prevalent need for an architecture that rethinks tradition, citing that non-traditional family structure has become increasingly accepted in the US. This shift away from traditional family structure is reflected by the 2015 supreme court case Obergefell v. Hodges allowing the legal marriage of same sex partners. A 2014 sociological study completed by on evangelical Christian groups saw a gradual transition away from opposition to same sex marriage and towards a quiet acceptance. Despite increased social support of diverse lifestyles a cultural transition towards a more diverse understanding of the family structure, apparent lack of space that supports an alternative life style. Dr. Rachana Prasad studies the prevalence of single person households citing that by 2050 35% of global households with be solo dwellings. Suggesting this social transformation is intertwined with reshaped family structures reflecting a broader shift in living arrangements, personal autonomy and societal policy implications. From the study of LGBTQ communities and changing family structures sociologists are calling to transition away from traditional suburban development and towards spaces that reflect the current needs of society at large.

== The future of Queer architecture ==
=== The Organization of Lesbian and Gay Architects + Designers (OLGAD) ===
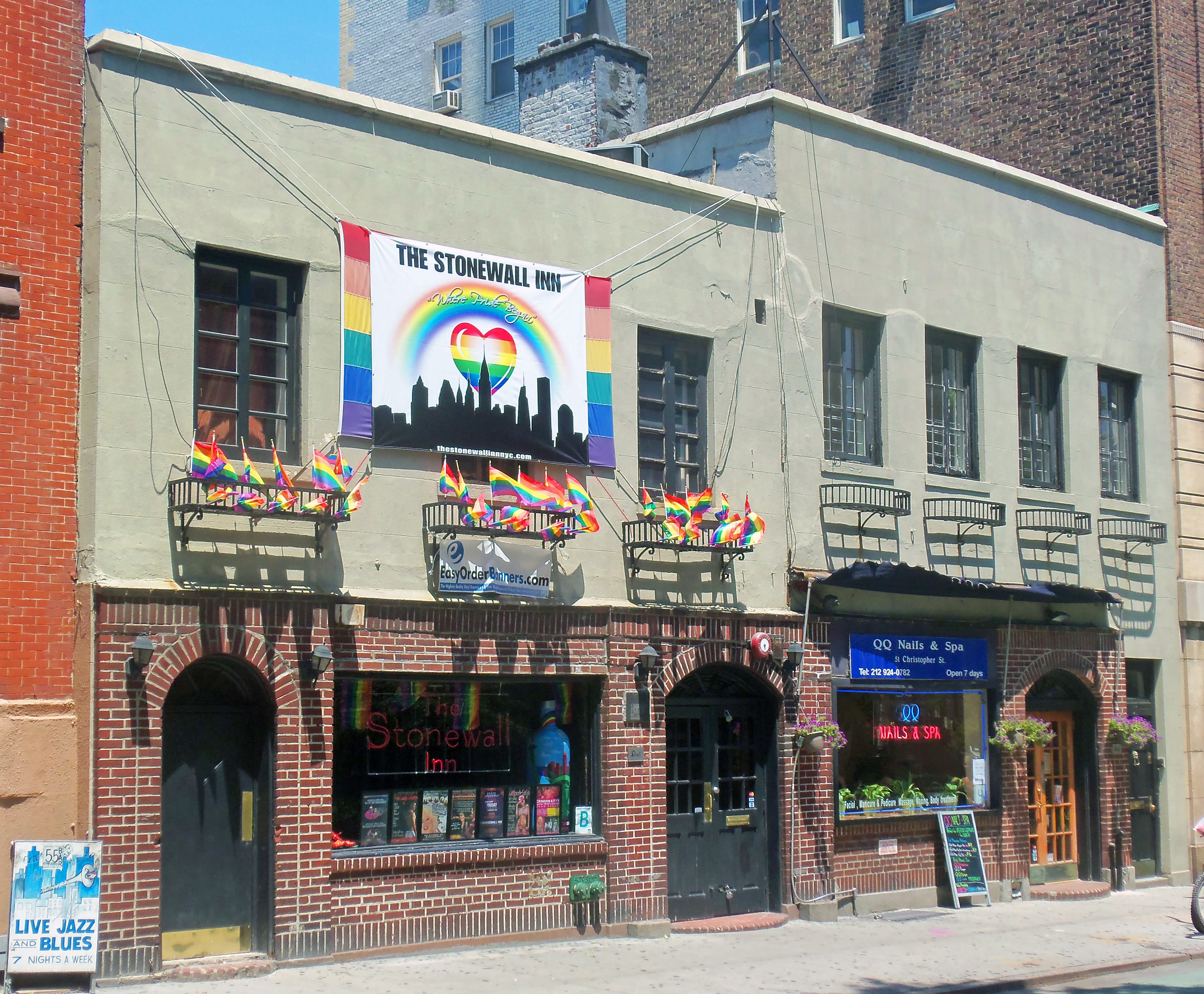
Stonewall Inn 2012 with gay-pride flags and banner

Established in 1991 in New York City, played a pivotal role in reclaiming queer architectural history and fostering discourse on "queer design." By identifying historically significant spaces and recognizing the contributions of LGBTQ architects, OLGAD connected architecture with broader movements for queer visibility. Its 1994 Guide to Lesbian & Gay New York Historical Landmarks expanded the understanding of LGBTQ place-based history beyond The Stonewall inn, influencing the recognition of sites like the Stonewall Inn on the National Register of Historic Places and as a National Historic Landmark. Evolving from OLGAD's efforts, the New York City LGBT Historic Sites Project, launched in 2015, continues to preserve, and highlight over 140 queer spaces across the city, showcasing the lasting impact of LGBTQ narratives on architectural and urban history.

=== ACSA an international association of architecture schools ===
The research series Where Are My People? Queer in Architecture explores the experiences of LGBTQIA+ individuals within the architecture profession, highlighting their contributions and the challenges they face. The findings reveal significant underrepresentation of LGBTQIA+ individuals across all major architectural organizations, such as NCARB, AIA and ACSA, with reported figures of less than 2% membership for LGBTQIA+ individuals and even fewer identifying as non-binary. These disparities underscore the marginalization of queer identities in architecture, worsened by the societal reluctance to collect or analyze comprehensive data on this population. Visibility remains limited, as many individuals may choose not to disclose their identities due to fear of discrimination or safety concerns, reflecting broader patterns of social exclusion.

The study emphasizes the importance of understanding the intersectional nature of LGBTQIA+ identities and their impact on architectural practice. These identities intersect with race, gender, class, and other social categories, shaping how individuals experience and contribute to the discipline. Survey respondents consistently cited their heightened awareness of marginalization, a perspective that influences their approach to architecture. These intersections challenge traditional narratives about who architecture serves, urging a redefinition of the profession's priorities to include broader and more inclusive responses to human needs.

A recurring theme in the study is the role of LGBTQIA+ architects in challenging traditional norms and stereotypes. Respondents highlighted their commitment to atypical space-making practices that resist the status quo and address the needs of marginalized communities. This counter-normative approach often manifests in advocating for more inclusive and diverse spaces that serve populations beyond conventional frameworks. Such efforts align with broader discussions about the potential of architecture to foster equity and justice in the built environment.

The research emphasizes the role of continued advocacy and data collection in documenting the experiences of LGBTQIA+ individuals in architecture. By keeping surveys open and updating findings, initiatives like Where Are My People? aim to track changes in representation and respond to evolving challenges. These efforts address not only representation but also the relationship between architectural practice and the diversity of society. Participation by LGBTQIA+ professionals contributes to ongoing discussions about equity and inclusion in the architectural discipline.

== Lesbian and feminist architectural spaces ==
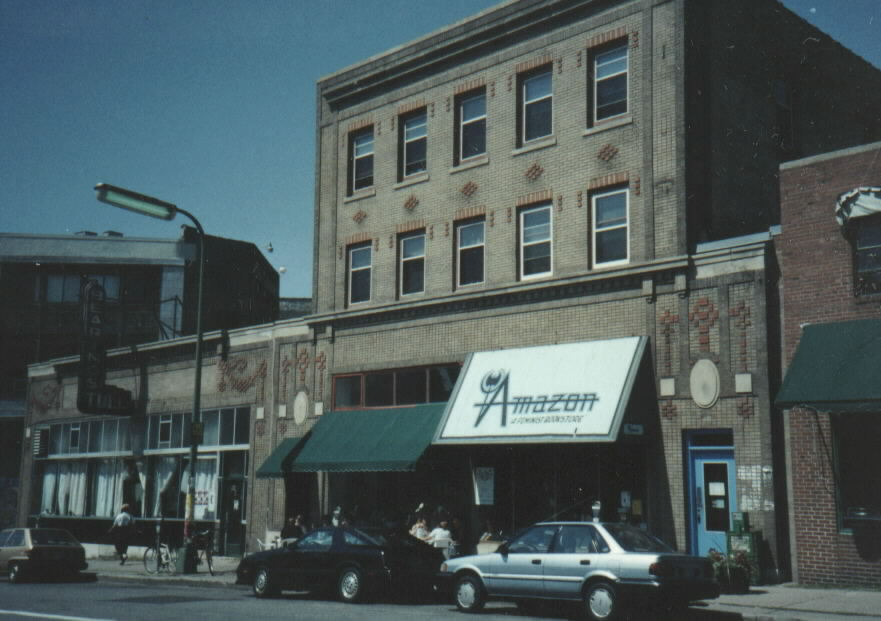
Amazon Bookstore, Minneapolis, 1971

Locations in the United States like Pride and Prejudice Books (aka the Women's Center), and Amazon Bookstore, are just some of the spaces that were repurposed to provide a safe spaces for feminist collectives and LGBTQ communities to meet and gather. In Chicago, in 1973, Pride and Prejudice Books emerged as a used book and feminist literature bookstore that quickly progressed into a feminist collective. Soon after Pride and Prejudice books opened, it morphed into the Women's Center which offered services like pregnancy testing and abortion practices. Pride and Prejudice Books was located in an old building that offered street-level store space with living quarters above. The owners at the time, Kathleen Thompson, Nick Patricca, and Lucina Kathmann expanded the living quarters to provide room and board for fellow travelers and friends. Amazon Bookstore opened in Minneapolis, in 1970, and served as an inclusive space for individuals to obtain feminist literature. Because the bookstore was located near the University of Minnesota, the primary demographic who used this space were white, middle class, leftist, women.The Amazon Bookstore supported lesbian and queer identities and often collaborated with other LGBTQ collectives (such as the Lesbian Resource Center) by sharing books and literature. Amazon Bookstore was started on the porch of the Brown House, which was a commune at the time but later moved to a house (as pictured above) in 1972.

In the United States in 1966, Tom Wondetski repurposed a former dance studio in Greenwich Village, Manhattan, into a countercultural school and leftist political program; renaming the space "Alternate U." This transformation became a popular and monumental location for queer collective meetings following the Stonewall rebellion. The Gay Liberation Front (GLF), a collective of gay men and women, utilized this space to organize meetings, plan protests, and dance parties that encouraged and celebrated same-sex dancing.
