= Paula M. Kimper =

American composer (born 1956)

Paula M. Kimper (born 1956) is an American composer of opera, film, theater, dance, and song, known especially for her 1998 opera, Patience and Sarah.

== Life and education ==
Kimper attended the Eastman School of Music. She lives and works in New York City, where she has been active for thirty years. Music students at Paul V. Moore High School in Syracuse, New York, were given awards in her name during the late 2000s. She is a lesbian, stating "I'm out, and I'm married. I live in New York, and as soon as it was possible in this state, we got married."

=== Career ===
Kimper's first opera, Patience and Sarah, premiered at the 1998 Lincoln Center Festival to a sold-out audience. It is considered the first lesbian opera. A 1996 New York Times review described the work as "...an accessible, attractively lyrical score that suggests the early 19th-century setting by drawing occasionally on hymn tunes and gloss of the parlor song style. Generally, though, her language is full of almost impressionistic harmonic touches; indeed, Sarah has a gorgeous, Ravelian aria at the start of the second act." The opera's 20th anniversary was celebrated with a run of performances in Chicago by the Third Eye Theater Ensemble.

In reference to her career as an opera composer, Kimper references the feminist nature of her works. "I've written four operas, and they all have really strong women. That's sort of my mission--to bring strong women to opera. These women are strong, heroic, and they have a happy ending. In opera, most lesbians don't."

Kimper's catalog of scores is held at the Loeb Music Library of Harvard University.

== Selected works ==
=== Operas ===
- Patience and Sarah (1998), libretto by Wende Persons, based on the novel by Isabel Miller (i.e. Alma Routsong)
- The Captivation of Eunice Williams (2004), libretto by Harley Erdman
- The Bridge of San Luis Rey (2007), based on the novel by Thornton Wilder
- TRUTH, An American Opera about Sojourner Truth (2012), libretto by Talaya Delaney

=== Vocal works ===
- Cantos del Duende (1998) for mezzo-soprano or soprano and piano, text by Federico García Lorca
- Mercy: The Grandmother Poems (1999) for soprano and piano
- Looking Back (2000), for tenor or baritone and piano, text by Heinrich Heine
- Six Songs from Heinrich Heine: Doppelgänger (2000)
- Song of Myself #6 "A child said" (2002) for voice and Tibetan Singing Bowl, text by Walt Whitman

=== Instrumental ===
- Underground Dream Suite (1979-80) for string quartet
