= Elizabeth Glaser (artist) =

American painter

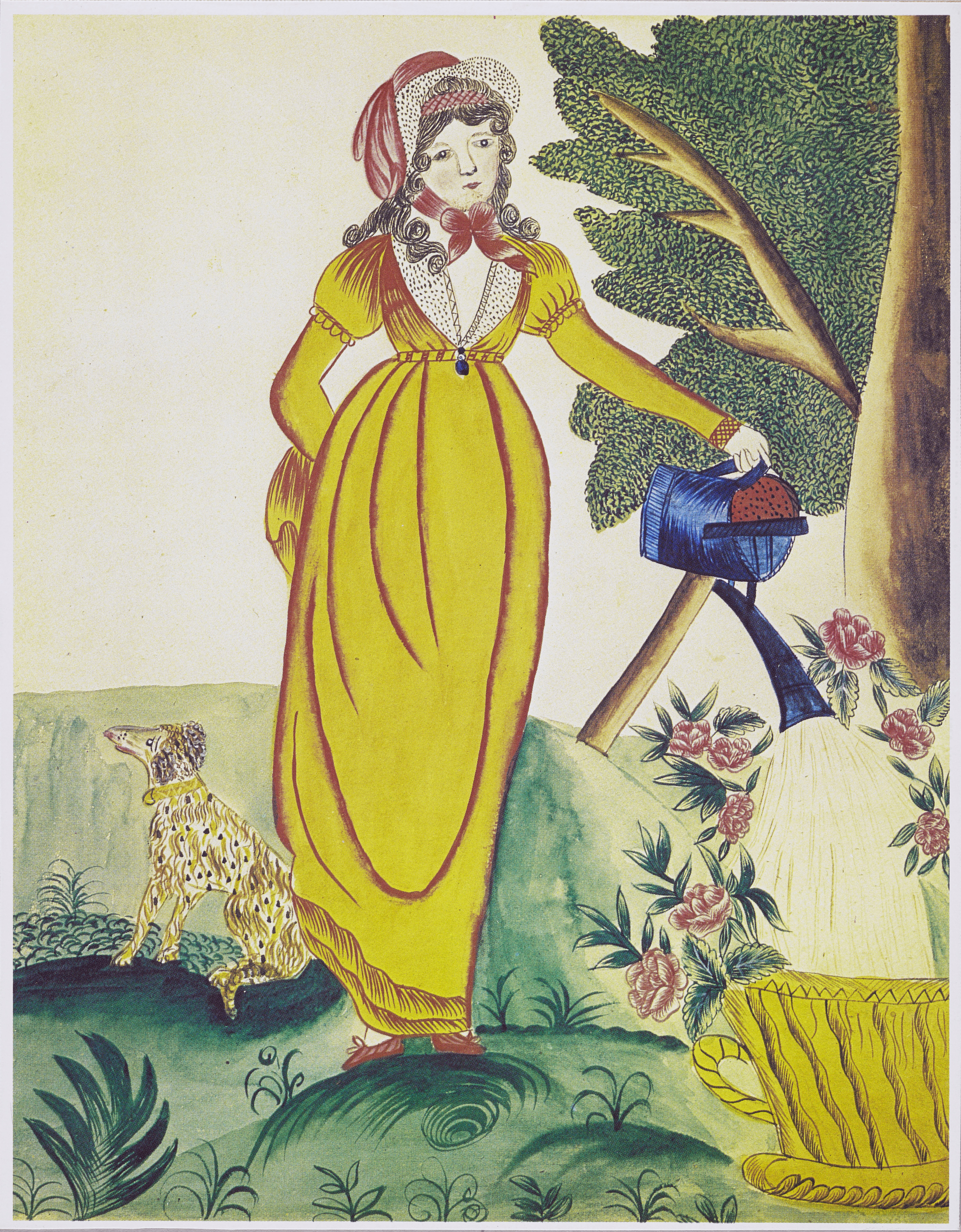
Lady in a Yellow Dress Watering Roses, ca. 1830. Watercolor on paper, 9 3/4 x 7 3/4 in. Private collection, Richmond

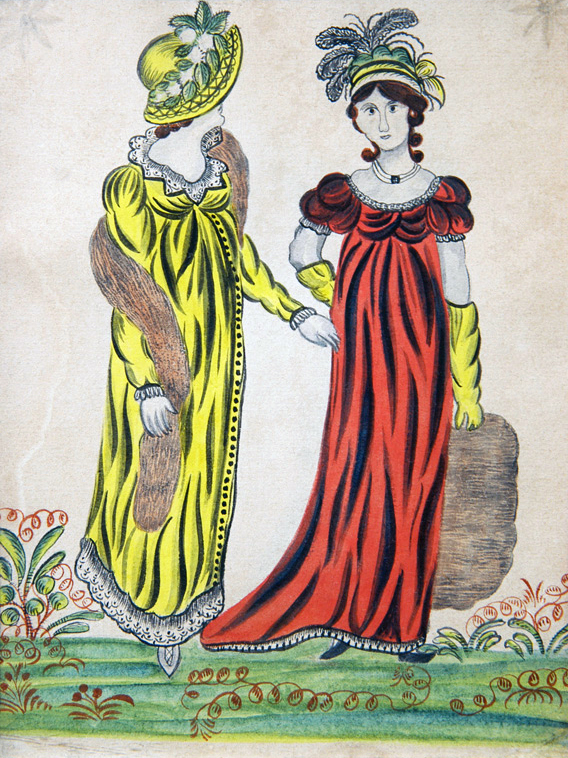
Fashionable Ladies, ca. 1815. Watercolor on paper, 6 3/4 x 5 1/4 in. Private collection

Elizabeth Glaser (active from approximately 1815–1830) was an American folk artist. Glaser and her contemporaries Eunice Pinney and Mary Ann Willson are three of the earliest American artists to work in the medium of watercolor.

== Life ==
Little is known about Glaser other than what can be gleaned from the inscriptions included on her paintings. It is likely that she lived in Baltimore or its environs since a few of her works bear inscriptions naming that city or the suburb of Fredericktown. In addition to her watercolours and drawings, she also produced needlework and poetry. As Richard B. Woodward has noted, the range of her activities reflects the education and artistic training common to upper-class American women during the early nineteenth century.

== Career ==
Glaser's few known watercolours include still lifes and images of fashionable women. All are characterized by bright colours, an economical, almost calligraphic style of drawing, and the sophisticated use of the paper surface in modelling figures and executing details. Woodward has commented that her "captivating style depends on the combination of refined draughtsmanship and broad areas of striking colour." Her watercolours have also been distinguished for their "potent sense of design." Glaser's work has been included in exhibitions mounted by the National Heritage Museum in Lexington, Massachusetts; the Kennedy Galleries in New York; and the Virginia Museum of Fine Arts in Richmond.

== Sources ==
- Banks, Mirra. Anonymous Was a Woman: A Celebration in Words and Images of Traditional American Art and the Women Who Made It. New York: St. Martin's Press, 1979, p. 56.
- Lexington, Museum of Our National Heritage. Reflections of 19th Century America: Folk Art From the Collection of Sybil and Arthur Kern [exh.]. September 19, 1979 – June 15, 1980.
- Lipman, Jean, Elizabeth V. Warren and Robert Bishop. Young America: A Folk-Art History. New York: Hudson Hills Press in association with the Museum of American Folk Art, 1986, p. 23.
- Smithsonian Art Inventory Catalog, Smithsonian Institution Research Information System, Smithsonian American Art Museum. http://www.siris.si.edu/ Retrieved 15 April 2015.
