= Barbara Love =

American feminist activist and writer (1937–2022)

- Born: Barbara Joan Love; February 27, 1937; Glen Ridge, New Jersey, U.S.
- Died: November 13, 2022 (aged 85); New York City, U.S.
- Occupations: Writer; activist
- Spouse: Donna Smith • 2018

Barbara Joan Love (February 27, 1937 – November 13, 2022) was an American feminist writer and the editor of Feminists who Changed America, 1963–1975. With the National Organization for Women, Love organized and participated in demonstrations, and she also worked within the organization to improve its acceptance of lesbian feminists. She helped to found consciousness-raising groups for lesbian feminists and was active in the gay liberation movement.

With fellow feminist Sidney Abbott, she co-authored Sappho Was a Right-on Woman: A Liberated View of Lesbianism, which she hoped would lead to greater awareness of society's oppression of women and lesbians. She also helped in the presentation to the American Psychiatric Association which led to the removal of homosexuality from the Diagnostic and Statistical Manual of Mental Disorders.

== Early life ==
Love was born in Glen Ridge, New Jersey, on February 27, 1937, and grew up from age 3 in Ridgewood, New Jersey. Her Danish father was a hosiery manufacturer. The king of Denmark decorated him for his role during the war as an underground agent. He also worked for Radio Free Europe. Her mother, Lois Love, whose ancestors were from colonial Massachusetts, was involved in community activities. Love had two brothers. She graduated from Ridgewood High School and attended Purdue University for its swim team before transferring to Syracuse University after two years to focus on journalism.

At 12 years of age as a competitive swimmer, she was the first person in New Jersey to break the record of the 100 yard freestyle in under a minute.

Love had several potential areas of contention with her parents as a Democratic lesbian feminist. The most significant concern of her "far right" Republican parents was that she was a Democrat. She became isolated from the rest of the family because she had friends who were not Protestants or Country Club members and many that were poor. She also "wondered why women had to be in the kitchen while men were in the living room discussing things of world import."

Love began having crushes on girls in middle school, but did not realize she was a lesbian and did not have anyone to talk to about her feelings. In 1968 she told her mother she was gay. Her mother's response was "First to thine own self be true". Lois Love supported her daughter in gay rights and pride marches and in the founding of the now national Parents of Gays (PFLAG).

== Education ==
Love studied journalism and graduated in 1959 from Syracuse University.

== Adulthood ==
After graduation, she taught at an American school in Italy. In the late 1950s and early 1960s, she lived in Greenwich Village and frequented lesbian bars in New York City. After cutting her hair short, she was beaten by a group of men.

=== Women's movement ===
Love became involved in the women's movement and the National Organization for Women (NOW) when there was a small New York chapter and national board. She learned about it while interviewing Long John Nebel, meeting with a NOW founder, Muriel Fox, and talking to the Long Island Press journalist Dolores Alexander who had interviewed Betty Friedan. She was invited to a meeting of the chapter's board of directors at Friedan's apartment in the Dakota Building. (Note: Her invitation to the NOW chapter meeting included a request to make a chicken recipe given to her by Dolores Alexander. Love said of the request, "I couldn't believe I'd joined the woman's movement to cook!") Aside from Friedan, whom she found "harsh and demanding," other activists included Rita Mae Brown and Kate Millett. Barbara helped to organize some of the group's demonstrations and participated in the demonstration against The New York Times, Colgate-Palmolive, and men-only restaurants and hotels. The demonstration against The New York Times called for integration of want ads for men and women. At that time there was a 25% discount for jobs filled by women, which is an equal pay for equal work issue.

Friedan, reflecting the tenor of some other heterosexual members of NOW, stated initially that the presence of lesbians in the organization was damaging to their image. Barbara Love's public response was: "My life had gotten better since I’d joined NOW and even better when I joined the women forging the beginnings of lesbian liberation," which reflected her intention to have lesbianism accepted as a feminist issue within NOW.

Love developed the Foremost Women in Communications by compiling the information, editing it, and having it published. She began the work in 1970 having realized the need to create a resource of the women's accomplishments and ability in the communication field.

=== Lesbian feminist ===
Feeling unaccepted by the gay and women's movements, Love and other lesbian feminists formed consciousness raising groups and encouraged other lesbians to join. Another coordinator was Sidney Abbott, who became Love's lover and co-author. In the 1970s they were fellow members of Radicalesbians. With Elizabeth Shanklin, Love founded the Matriarchists, a radical feminist group. It hosted conferences, held consciousness-raising sessions, wrote position papers, and in the early 1970s published a newspaper entitled Matriarchists.

While Kate Millett was speaking about sexual liberation at Columbia University in 1970, a woman in the audience asked her, "Why don't you say you're a lesbian, here, openly. You've said you were a lesbian in the past." Millett hesitantly responded, "Yes, I am a lesbian". A couple of weeks later, Time's December 8, 1970 article "Women's Lib: A Second Look" reported that Millett admitted she was bisexual, which it said would likely discredit her as a spokesperson for the feminist movement because it "reinforce[d] the views of those skeptics who routinely dismiss all liberationists as lesbians." In response, two days later a press conference was organized by Love and Ivy Bottini in Greenwich Village which led to a statement in the name of 30 lesbian and feminist leaders which declared their "solidarity with the struggle of homosexuals to attain their liberation in a sexist society".

Love made an appearance on The Phil Donahue Show in 1970 and on PBS' David Susskind Show in 1971, along with six other lesbians, including Lilli Vincenz and Barbara Gittings. They were among the first open lesbians to appear on television in the US, and debated long-held stereotypes about gays with Susskind. A week after her appearance on the David Susskind Show, a middle-aged couple approached Gittings in the supermarket to claim, "You made me realize that you gay people love each other just the way Arnold and I do."

In their essay Is Women's Liberation a Lesbian Plot published in the book Women in a Sexist Society (1971), Sydney Abbott and Love gave their opinion about lesbians’ role in the women's liberation movement:

Lesbians are the women who potentially can demonstrate life outside the male power structure that dominates marriage as well as every other aspect of our culture. Thus, the lesbian movement is not only related to women's liberation, it is at the very heart of it.

Regarding the way in which lesbians represented the ultimate liberated women, Love said in 1972:

Lesbians have economic independence, sexual self-determination, that is, control over their bodies and life styles.

That year, at a national NOW conference in California, Arlie Scott led an effort that resulted in NOW passing a resolution asserting that lesbianism is a feminist issue. Friedan endorsed the lesbian rights resolution at the International Women's Year conference in Houston in 1976.

Abbott and Love left Radicalesbians and formed 26 consciousness-raising groups in the late 1970s. Sidney Abbott, Kate Millett, Phyllis Birkby, Alma Routsong, and Artemis March were among the members of CR One, the first lesbian-feminist consciousness-raising group.

=== Psychiatric diagnosis ===
There used to be a record in the Diagnostic and Statistical Manual of Mental Disorders (DSM) for homosexuality. Barbara Gittings, Love, and other lesbian and gay people made a presentation in 1971 to the American Psychiatric Association (APA) that influenced the December 15, 1973 decision to remove homosexuality from the DSM. Two diagnoses remained in the DSM: "ego-dystonic homosexuality" and "sexual disturbance disorder".

=== Parents of Gays ===
Sidney Abbott and Love were among the first feminists to join the gay liberation movement.

Love helped publicize the first meeting of Parents of Gays, now the national PFLAG National organization. According to Morty Manford, who co-founded Parents of Gays with his mother Jeanne Manford and his father Jules, and organized the first meeting: "I handled the nuts and bolts of publicizing it. I placed an advertisement in the Village Voice. I also coordinated everything with Barbara Love, a very respected lesbian writer at that time... In those days we were very sensitive to the need for men and women to be working together, that nothing we did should be done solely from a gay male point of view. It was very important that Barbara was one of the organizers of this effort. She was able to reach out to the lesbian community as I reached out to the gay male community in an effort to publicize this [meeting]. We asked everybody to let their parents know we had a place for them to come."

=== Identity House ===
Love co-founded a free walk-in center for gays, Identity House.

=== Sappho Was a Right-on Woman ===
In 1971, Love co-authored the first non-fiction book about lesbianism from a positive perspective, Sappho Was a Right-on Woman, with Sidney Abbott. It was also the first to discuss the connection between feminism and lesbianism. They wrote that a goal of the book was that lesbians could live their lives "unconsciously", without the societal stigma placed upon them because of their gender or sexuality. To be "the most ordinary people" required awareness created through the gay liberation and women's liberation movements that would lead to elimination of oppressive behaviors and practices.

=== Feminists Who Changed America 1963–1975 ===
In 1996, she began a project to write biographies of 2,200 second-wave feminists and record the important events from that period, which was published in the book Feminists Who Changed America 1963–1975. She was assisted by Veteran Feminists of America (VFA) members. Her book has been the subject of discussion or conferences at VFA and NOW events.

In an interview about the book, Barbara Love said:

This book had to be written. The success of the Second Wave of the women's movement was the result of a collective effort by thousands of people. This book aims to recognize the struggles and accomplishments of each individual involved in the movement. It includes the biographies of more than 2200 women (and some men) whose actions effected substantial change for women from 1963—the year of publication for Betty Friedan's The Feminine Mystique—to 1975.

For living "changemakers", information was gathered via questionnaires and other sources of information. In addition to research, people close to deceased activists were interviewed for information gathering. The book focuses on the contributions of individuals, rather than organizations. Information about each feminist is archived at Smith College’s Sophia Smith Collection.

=== Later years and death ===
Love was on the board of Veteran Feminists of America and the organization has said of Love, "If Second Wave activists were graded according to their contributions, Barbara Love would be in the top ten."

She continued to swim competitively into her 70s. For instance, she brought home several gold medals in the senior woman's age group of the Gay Games in Amsterdam in 1998.

Love married Donna Smith in 2018.

Love died on November 13, 2022, at the age of 85.

== Works ==
Editor

- Feminists who Changed America, 1963–1975. University of Illinois Press. 2006. ISBN 978-0252031892.

Author

- Foremost women in communications: a biographical reference work on accomplished women in broadcasting, publishing, advertising, public relations, and allied professions. Foremost Americans Publishing Corporation. 1970. ISBN 978-0835204149.
- Barbara J. Love (2021). “There At The Dawning: Memories of a Lesbian Feminist”. ISBN 978-1-6671-6477-9

Co-author

- Sydney Abbott; Barbara Love (1972). "Is Women's Liberation a Lesbian Plot?". Woman in Sexist Society: Studies in Power and Powerlessness. New American Library. ISBN 9780-465091997.
- Sidney Abbott; Barbara Love (1977). Sappho was a Right-on Woman: A Liberated View of Lesbianism. Stein and Day. ISBN 978-0812824063.
- Barbara Love; Elizabeth Shanklin (1983). "The Answer is Matriarchy". In Joyce Trebilcot (ed.). Mothering: Essays in Feminist Theory. New Jersey: Rowman & Allenheld.
