= WSPA =

WSPA may refer to:

- World Society for the Protection of Animals, the former name of World Animal Protection, an international non-profit animal welfare organisation
- Western States Petroleum Association
- Winston-Salem Preparatory Academy, a public school in Forsyth County, North Carolina, United States
- WSPA-TV, a television station (channel 11, virtual 7) licensed to Spartanburg, South Carolina, United States
- WSPA-FM, a radio station (106.3 FM) licensed to Simpsonville, South Carolina, United States
- WOLI (AM), a radio station (910 AM) licensed to Spartanburg, South Carolina, United States, which used the call sign WSPA prior to October 2005
- WYRD-FM, a radio station (98.9 FM) licensed to Spartanburg, South Carolina, United States, which used the call sign WSPA-FM prior to March 2023
- Women's School of Planning and Architecture, a feminist educational program founded in 1975
