= Eunice Pinney =

American painter

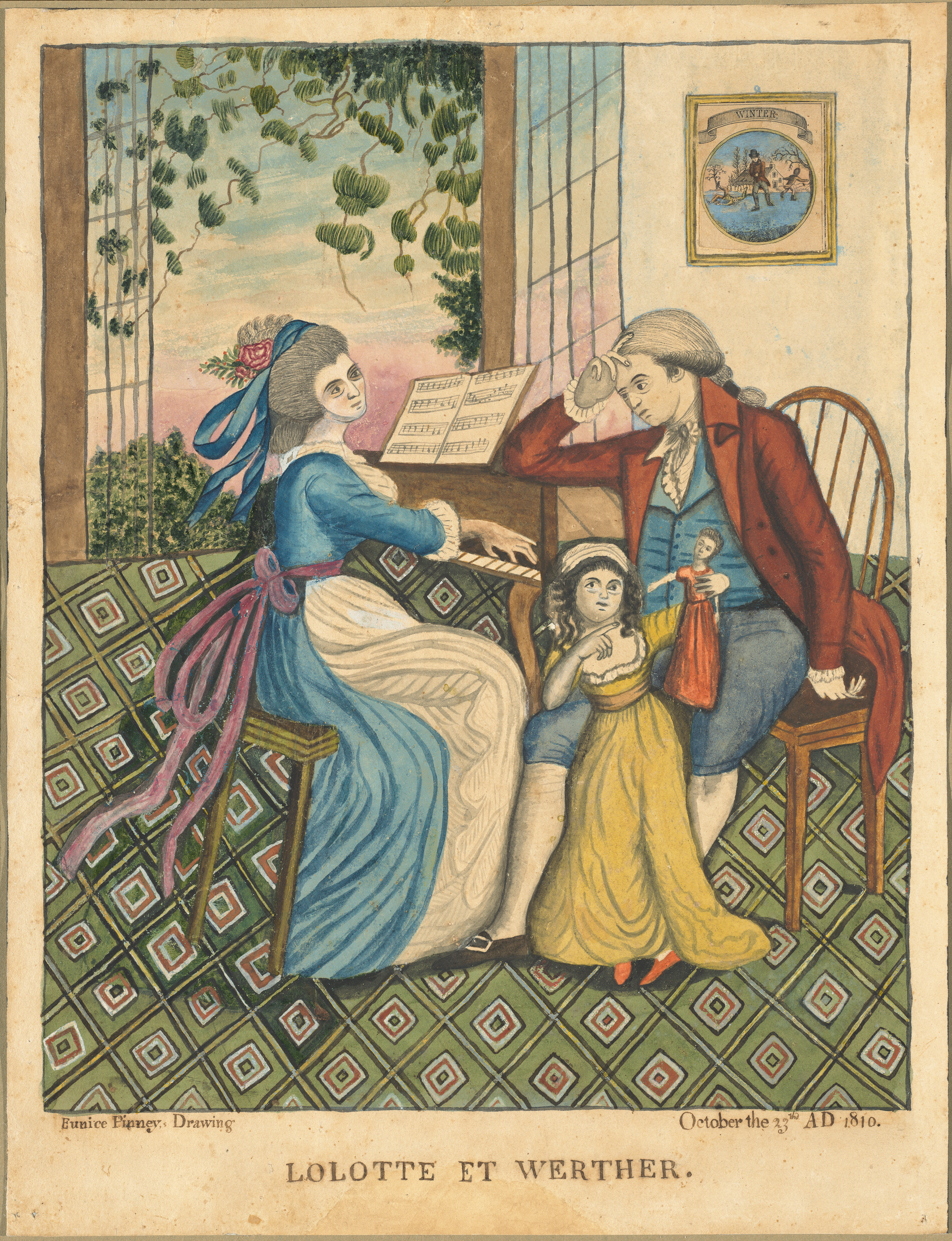
Lolotte and Werther, 1810, watercolor, in the collection of the National Gallery of Art

Eunice Griswold Holcombe Pinney (February 9, 1770 – 1849) was an American folk artist active in the towns of Windsor and Simsbury, Connecticut. According to art historian Jean Lipman, a specialist in American folk painting, Pinney and her contemporary Mary Ann Willson are considered two of the earliest American painters to work in the medium of watercolor.

== Life ==
Pinney was a well-educated woman from an influential Connecticut family. She was a descendant of Matthew Griswold, who emigrated from Kenilworth, England, to Windsor, Connecticut, in 1639 and became an active participant in the political affairs of the Colony. The marriage of Eunice's parents, Simsbury natives Eunice Viets and Elisha Griswold, reportedly "brought together two of the most considerable families and estates in the town." Eunice was the fifth of the couple's eight surviving children. Her brother (the couple's second child) was Alexander Viets Griswold, who became the first and only Episcopal bishop of the Eastern States Diocese. His biography, A Memoir of the Life of Bishop Griswold published in 1844, offers crucial information about Eunice and her family. According to the author, John S. Stone, D.D., Eunice was "a woman of uncommonly extensive reading" and was "zealously instrumental" in the organization and maintenance of her local Episcopal church.

Eunice married Oliver Holcombe of Granby (born 1769) in approximately 1790. Holcombe died young, in his twenties: he drowned when attempting to ford a stream during a trip to Ohio. Traditionally, scholars have assumed that this event left Eunice a young widow, but recent research has revealed that the marriage was an abusive one and that before Holcombe died, the couple had already been divorced. Eunice had two children from this marriage: Hector and Sophia Holcombe (Phelps). In 1797, Eunice married Butler Pinney of Windsor (1766–1850). It appears that the couple initially settled in Windsor but relocated to Simsbury, where Eunice had been born, in about 1844. Eunice and Butler had three children: Norman, Viets Griswold, and Minerva Emeline (Bright). Minerva also was an artist and taught painting at a school in Virginia for several years before her marriage. Eunice died in Simsbury at the age of 79.

== Career ==
All of Pinney's signed and dated watercolors range from 1809 to 1826, which suggests to scholars that she only began painting later in life, some time after her second marriage, and that the majority of her work was executed in Windsor and Simsbury. Like her contemporaries Willson and Elizabeth Glaser, she was probably self-taught. Pinny's surviving watercolors include genre subjects, landscapes, portraits, allegories, historical and religious narratives, and memorial scenes, and are characterized by balanced, architectonic compositions, sturdy figures, strong contours and bold colors. Although she was active in the nineteenth century, her protagonists often sport eighteenth-century fashions. As Lipman has noted, "her manner of painting and even the costuming of her figures belong to the 1700s ... It is scarcely stretching the point to consider her an eighteenth-century person who worked in the early nineteenth century."

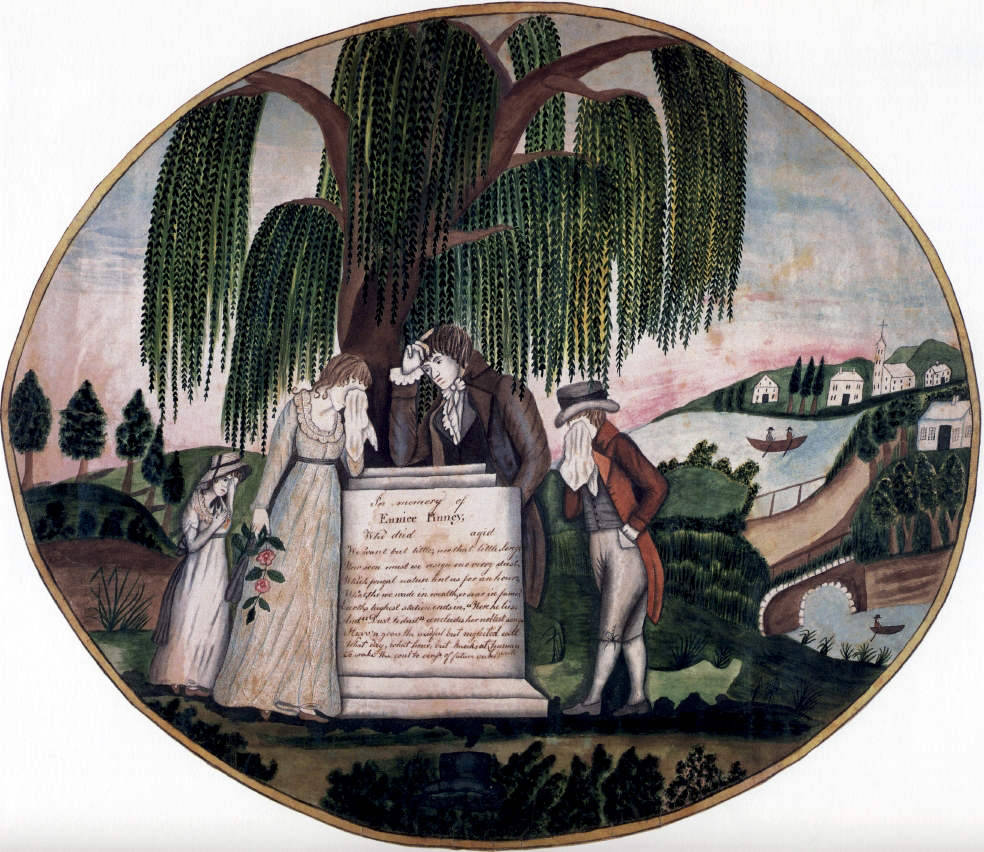
Eunice Pinney memorial, executed in 1813. Watercolor on paper, 42 x 49 cm, Museum of Fine Arts, Boston

Many of her compositions, especially those featuring historical or literary narratives, may have been based on popular English engravings. For example, her Couple and a Casualty of about 1815 in the collection of the Abby Aldrich Rockefeller Folk Art Museum in Colonial Williamsburg, Virginia, appears to have been based on an English copperplate design on cotton. Pinney also may have mined the patterns of rare English toiles for inspiration. Her genre scenes and memorial paintings, however, are wholly original, exhibiting a sophisticated use of color, robust figures and complex compositions. Scholars of American painting such as Mary Black and Jean Lipman have compared Pinney's work to that of Thomas Rowlandson due to its vigor and sense of theatricality.

It is unknown if Pinney trained her daughter Minerva in the technique of watercolor, yet Eunice did send paintings to Minerva when she was teaching in Virginia to provide models for the students.

== Collections ==
Although many of Pinney's surviving works are owned by her descendants, important examples have entered public collections, including the National Gallery of Art, Washington and the American Folk Art Museum in New York City.
