= Aaron Betsky =

American architect

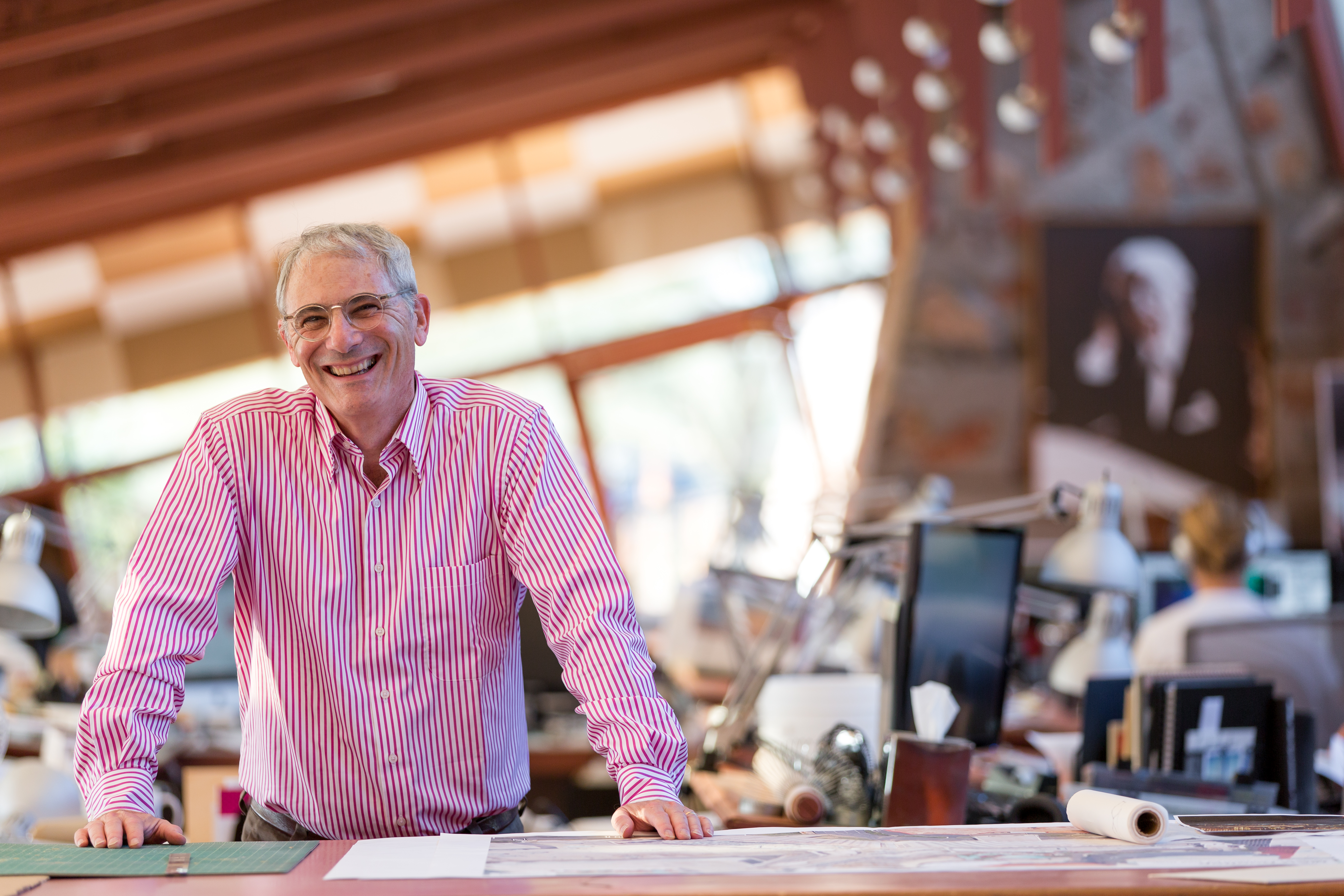
Aaron Betsky

Aaron Betsky (born 1958 in Missoula, Montana) is an American critic of art, architecture, and design. He was the director of Virginia Tech's School of Architecture + Design until early 2022.

Trained as an architect and in the humanities at Yale University, he is the author of over a dozen books, including Architecture Matters, Making It Modern, Landscrapers: Building With the Land, Scanning: The Aberrant Architectures of Diller + Scofidio, Queer Space, Revelatory Landscapes, and Architecture Must Burn. Internationally known as a lecturer, curator, reviewer, and commentator, he writes the blog "Beyond Buildings" for Architect Magazine. Director of the 11th Venice Architecture Biennale, he has also been president and Dean of the School of Architecture at Taliesin (originally the Frank Lloyd Wright School of Architecture), director of the Netherlands Architecture Institute (2001–2006) the Cincinnati Art Museum (2006–2014), and was founding Curator of Architecture, Design and Digital Projects at the San Francisco Museum of Modern Art (1995–2001). As an unlicensed architect, he worked for Frank O. Gehry & Associates and Hodgetts + Fung. In 2003, he co-curated "Scanning: The Aberrant Architectures of Diller + Scofidio" at the Whitney Museum of American Art.

== Early life ==
Betsky was born in Missoula, Montana, but moved with his family as a child to the Netherlands, returning to the USA for college at Yale University. He graduated from Yale in 1979 with a B.A. in History, the Arts and Letters (1979) and received his Master of Architecture from Yale University School of Architecture in 1983.

== Career ==
From 1995 to 2001 Betsky was Curator of Architecture, Design and Digital Projects at the San Francisco Museum of Modern Art. From 2001 to 2006 he served as director of the Netherlands Architecture Institute. He has taught at SCI-Arc, the A. Alfred Taubman College of Architecture and Urban Planning at the University of Michigan, the University of Cincinnati, among others, and worked for Frank O. Gehry & Associates and Hodgetts + Fung. From August 2006 to January 2014, he was the director of the Cincinnati Art Museum. In 2008, he was named as the director of the 11th Exhibition of the Venice Biennale of Architecture, which he titled, Out There. Architecture Beyond Building. In January 2015, Betsky was appointed dean of the School of Architecture at Taliesin (formerly the Frank Lloyd Wright School of Architecture). In 2020 he was appointed director of the School of Architecture + Design at Virginia Tech, but as of February 2022 was listed as Professor.

== Writings ==
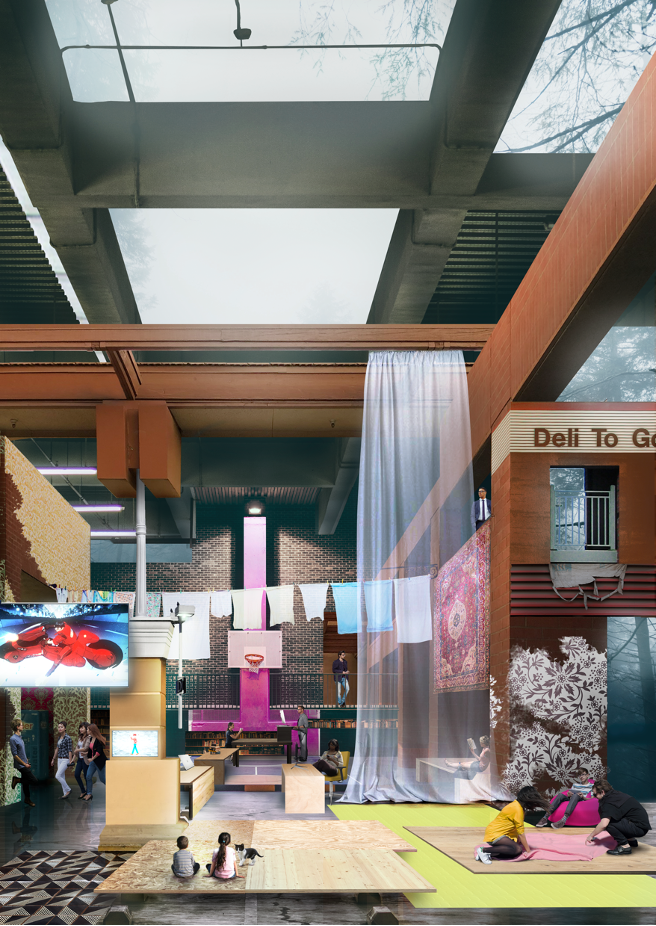
Photo of a project curated by Aaron Betsky and Jan Sobotka in response to a challenge to depict the future of architecture

Betsky has addressed the historically gendered nature of architecture (Building Sex: Men, Women, Architecture, and the Construction of Sexuality, 1995), the unique qualities of Dutch design (False Flat: Why Dutch Design is So Good, 2004), and consistently advocated for an interpretation of architecture that transcends physical building (see his writings in Architecture Must Burn, 2000; and Out There: Architecture Beyond Building, 2008). Another recurrent theme in his writings is a call to embrace and reimagine the American suburban landscape (see At Home in Sprawl, 2011). Betsky has championed temporary or pop-up architecture as a democratic antidote to architecture's traditional "ridiculous obsession with eternity." He has often called for the renovation and adaptive reuse of old buildings rather than wasteful construction of new ones: "When will we learn that adaptation and reuse is so much better?"

Betsky has written monographs on the work of numerous 20th and 21st century architects and designers, including Zaha Hadid, I.M. Pei, UN Studio, Koning Eizenberg, MVRDV, Renny Ramakers, Jim Olson, Frank Lloyd Wright, and James Gamble Rogers, as well as treatises on aesthetics, psychology and human sexuality as they pertain to aspects of architecture, and is one of the main contributors to a spatial interpretation of Queer theory. His essay "Plain Weirdness: The Architecture of Neutelings Riedijk" won the 2014 Geert Bekaert Prize in Architectural Criticism. He has made significant contributions to architecture history and theory, including a scholarly monograph on early-20th-century architect James Gamble Rogers (ISBN 978-0262023818) and an analysis of buildings embedded in the earth, Landscrapers: Building with the Land (ISBN 9780500341889). His 2016 book on the history of Modern design, Making It Modern, was listed on Metropolis magazine's "Top 50 Design Books to Read This Fall." His 2017 book Architecture Matters, which Interior Design magazine called "a delightful ramble through a lively, well-stocked mind," offers "46 Thoughts on Why Architecture Matters," among them “Why Architecture Is So Cool (to a Teenager),” “How Dreams Die in the Process,” “How Perfection Kills,” “Why It All Happens in China,” and “What We Can Still Learn From the Greeks.”

In addition to his books, Betsky authors a twice-weekly column for Architect Magazine, the "Beyond Buildings" blog, and is a contributing writer for Dezeen magazine. His articles, published in various magazines such as ArtForum, Architectural Review, Architect, Blueprint, and others, include critical ideas for improving the built environment, for example: "We need to start from the qualities of the interior that usually come from furniture and furnishings, while also paying attention to the thoughtful use of light, scale and sequence. This means that pattern and decoration, arrangement of furniture and fixtures, ways in which buildings respond to the body, and the ability for the interior to both cocoon us and create a relationship to a larger world through frames and views, need to be the seed of all design."

== Publications ==
- Aaron Betsky. (2021). Foreword. In Max Strang's, Subtropic: The Architecture of [Strang], (pp.XXIII-XXX). Oscar Riera Ojeda Pub. ISBN 978-1-94622-651-8
- Aaron Betsky, G. Shapiro, Andrew Pielage (2021). 50 Lessons to Learn from Frank Lloyd Wright. Rizzoli. ISBN 9780847865369
- Aaron Betsky (2019). Renny Ramakers: Rethinking Design. Lars Müller. ISBN 978-3-03778-569-0
- Jim Olson, Aaron Betsky (2018). Jim Olson: Building, Nature, Art. Thames & Hudson. ISBN 978-0500343333
- Aaron Betsky and Andrew Bromberg (2018). Andrew Bromberg at Aedas: Building, Nature, Cities. Thames & Hudson. ISBN 9780500519653
- Aaron Betsky (2017). Architecture Matters. Thames and Hudson. ISBN 9780500519080
- Aaron Betsky (2016). Making it Modern: The History of Modernism in Architecture of Design. New York and Barcelona: Actar. ISBN 978-1940291154
- Aaron Betsky (2012) At Home in Sprawl: Selected Essays on Architecture. RMIT University Press. ISBN 978-1921426858
- Aaron Betsky (2008). Out There. Architecture Beyond Building: 11th International Architecture Exhibition La Biennale di Venezia. Marsilio. ISBN 978-8831794473
- Aaron Betsky, Adam Eeuwens (2004) False Flat: Why Dutch Design Is So Good. Phaidon. ISBN 978-0714848617
- W. Maas, A. Betsky, S. Kwinter, B. Lootsma, A. Ruby (2003). Reading MVRDV. Rotterdam: NAi Publishers.
- A. Betsky, K. M. Hays, G. M. Anderson (2003) Scanning: The Aberrant Architectures of Diller + Scofidio. Whitney Museum of American Art. ISBN 978-0874271317
- Aaron Betsky (2002) Landscrapers: building with the land. Thames and Hudson. ISBN 978-0500341889
- B. van Berkel, A. Betsky, C. Bos, M. Wigley (2002) UN Studio: UNFOLD, NAi Publishers. ISBN 978-9056622619
- Aaron Betsky, E. Adigard (2000) Architecture Must Burn: a manifesto for an architecture beyond building. Thames and Hudson. ISBN 978-0500282045
- R. Moore, J. Herzog, A. Betsky, P. Davies (1999) Vertigo: The Strange New World of the Contemporary City. Gingko Press.
- A. Betsky, O. R. Ojeda (1999) Miller Hull Partnership. Rockport Publishers.
- T. González de León, A. Betsky, A. Leon (1998) Kalach & Alvarez, Rockport Publishers.
- A. Betsky, A. Suzuki, D. Jackson, P. Zellner (1998) Pacific Edge: Contemporary Architecture on the Pacific Rim. Rizzoli.
- T. Riley, A. Betsky, X. Costa, M. Robbins (1998) Fabrications, Actar.
- Aaron Betsky (1998) Zaha Hadid: Das Gesamtwerk. DVA. ISBN 9783421031730
- Zaha M. Hadid, Aaron Betsky (1998). Zaha Hadid: The Complete Buildings and Projects. Rizzoli. ISBN 978-0500280843
- Aaron Betsky (1997). Queer space: architecture and same-sex desire. William Morrow. ISBN 978-0688143015
- Aaron Betsky (1997). ICONS: Magnets of Meaning. San Francisco: San Francisco Museum of Modern Art. ISBN 9780811818575
- A. Jarmusch, A. Betsky, R. W. Quigley, M. S. Larson, M. Benedikt, M. Les Benedict (1996). Rob Wellington Quigley: Buildings and Projects. Rizzoli.
- Aaron Betsky (1995) Building sex : men, women, architecture, and the construction of sexuality. William Morrow. ISBN 978-0688131678
- Aaron Betsky (1994) James Gamble Rogers and the Architecture of Pragmatism, The MIT Press. ISBN 978-0262023818
- Aaron Betsky (1992) Architecture & medicine : I.M. Pei designs the Kirklin Clinic, University Press of America
- Aaron Betsky, J. Chase, L. Whiteson (1991) Experimental Architecture in Los Angeles. Rizzoli.
- Aaron Betsky (1990) Violated perfection: Architecture and the Fragmentation of the Modern. Rizzoli. ISBN 978-0847812691

== See also ==
- Literature focused on LGBTQ architecture and design
