= Sidney Abbott =

American feminist and lesbian activist (1937–2015)

- Born: Sidney Afton Abbott; July 11, 1937
- Died: April 15, 2015 (aged 77); Southold, New York, U.S.
- Known for: Lesbian rights activist

Sidney Abbott (July 11, 1937 – April 15, 2015) was an American feminist, a lesbian activist, and a writer. A former member of the Lavender Menace, she co-authored Sappho Was a Right-on Woman: A Liberated View of Lesbianism with Barbara Love, and was one of the most vocal and active members in the National Organization for Women, helping the organization to focus on not just women's rights in general, but lesbian rights, as well.

== Life and career ==
Sidney Afton Abbott was born on July 11, 1937 into a military family, describing herself as a military brat. She attended Smith College for three years and graduated from the University of New Mexico in 1961. She then attended Columbia University for graduate school, where she studyied urban planning.

In 1969, she joined the National Organization for Women (NOW) and became one of the first people to speak out for lesbian rights on panels at the New York chapter of NOW and at Columbia University. Abbott was a member of the Lavender Menace and co-authored Sappho Was a Right-on Woman: A Liberated View of Lesbianism in 1971, with Barbara Love.

In the mid-1970s, with Barbara Love, she lobbied for a NOW task force to be established to focus on lesbian issues; eventually, it was established. NOW first named the task force the "sexuality and lesbian task force," and Abbott had to co-chair with a heterosexual woman. At the NOW national conference in Philadelphia in 1976, Abbott demanded that 1% of the organization's budget should go to the task force, and succeeded. During the conference, it was only one of two resolutions that passed.

Abbott served on the founding board of the National Gay and Lesbian Task Force and worked to ensure the organization's board had an equal number of gay men and lesbian women. She was named by the Manhattan Borough President to the community planning board, becoming the first openly gay person to hold this position. She also served as program developer for two departments in the New York City government. She was co-chair for the New York Performing Arts Center and was politically active in the North Fork area of Long Island, New York.

Abbott and Kate Millett, Phyllis Birkby, Alma Routsong, and Artemis March were among the members of CR One, the first lesbian-feminist consciousness-raising group.

== Later years ==
Abbott lived in Southold, New York. In 2007, she founded the nonprofit organization Women's Rights are Human Rights. In 2008, she started a newsletter, In Our Shoes, focusing on politics, class, and poverty. Her personal archives are located in the Sophia Smith Collection at Smith College and in the Radcliffe College feminist collection of NOW biographies.

== Death ==
Abbott died in a house fire in Southold, New York on April 15, 2015, aged 77.

== Works ==
- Sidney Abbott; Barbara Love (1972). "Is Women's Liberation a Lesbian Plot?". Woman in Sexist Society: Studies in Power and Powerlessness. New American Library. ISBN 978-0-465-09199-7.
- Sidney Abbott; Barbara Love (1977). Sappho was a Right-on Woman: A Liberated View of Lesbianism. Stein and Day. ISBN 978-0-8128-2406-3.
