= Mary Ann Willson =

American artist

- Known for: Painting
- Movement: Outsider Art

Mary Ann Willson (active 1810 to 1825) was an American folk artist whose work remained undiscovered for over a century, until it appeared in an exhibition of American Primitive paintings in 1944. Little is known of her life, but evidence suggests that she may have been one of the first American watercolorists.

== Life and career ==
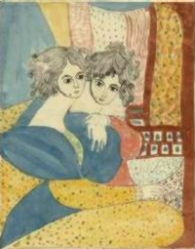
The Two Sisters, c. 1820, watercolor

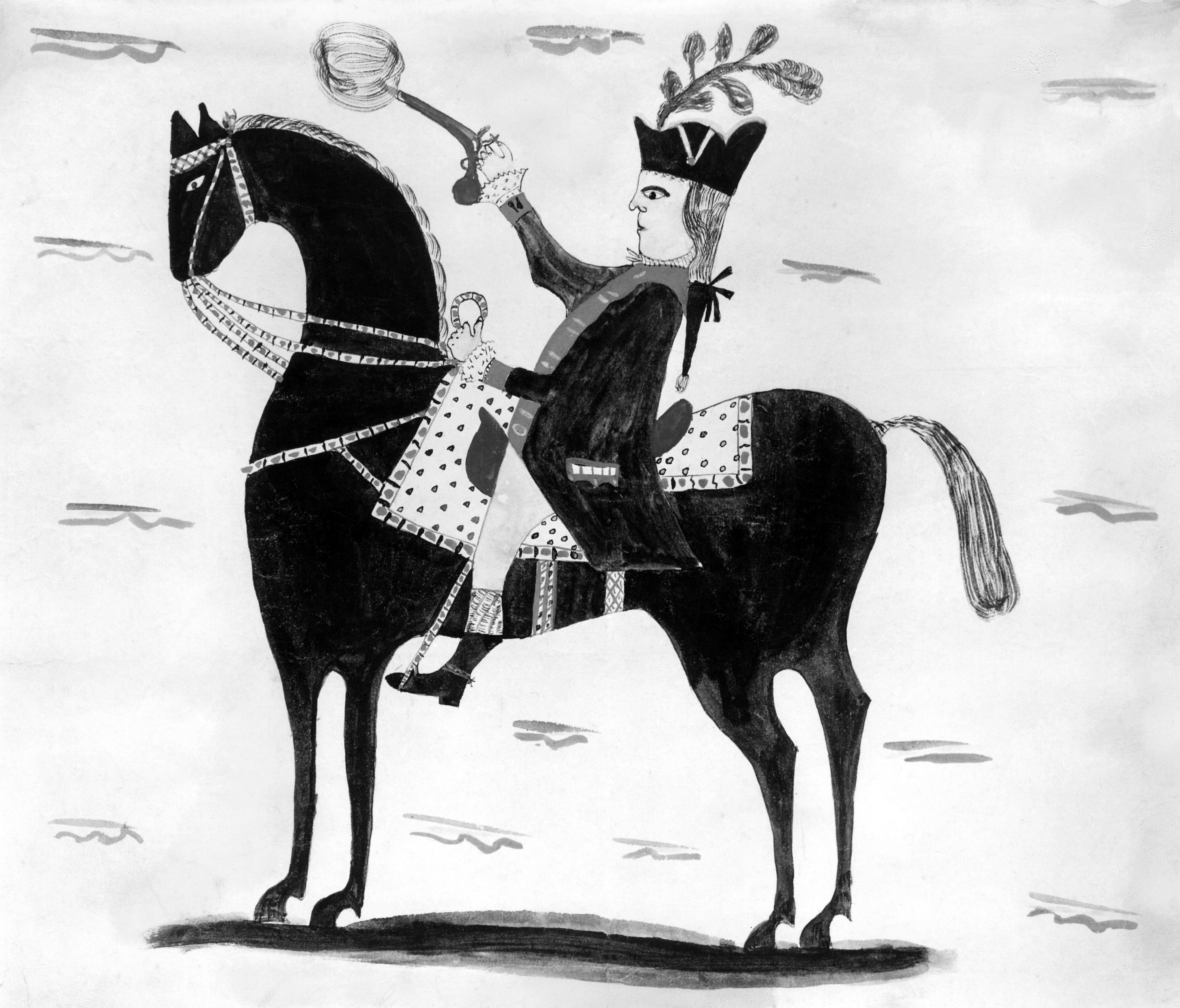
George Washington, watercolor, Rhode Island School of Design Museum, Providence

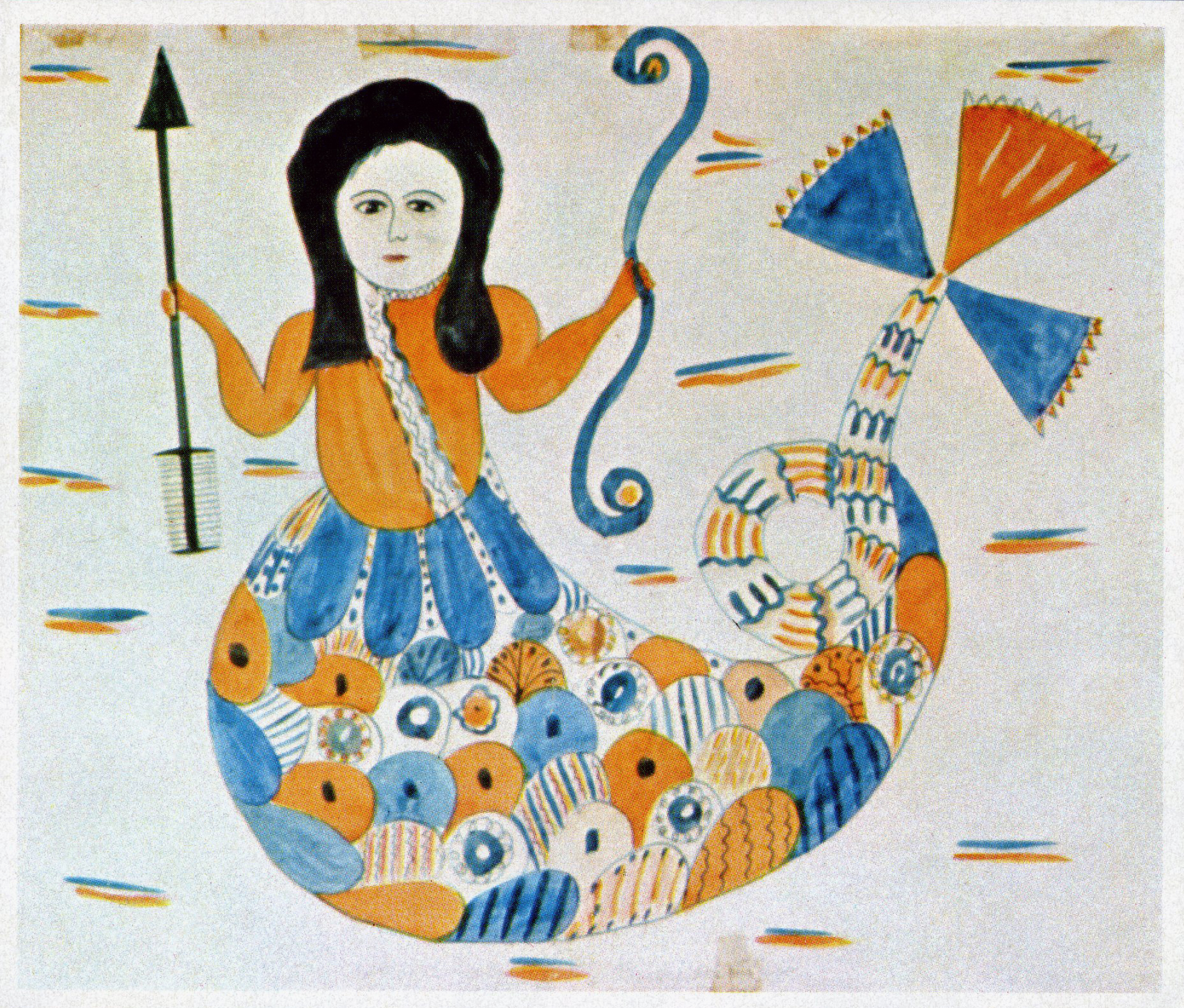
Marimaid (or Mermaid), c. 1820, watercolor executed in vegetable dyes

Mary Ann Willson was an American folk artist based in Greene County, New York. She was unknown until 1943, when a portfolio of her work was discovered by staff at the Harry Stone Gallery in New York City. According to art historian Jean Lipman, Willson and her contemporary Eunice Pinney of Connecticut are considered two of the earliest American painters to work in the medium of watercolor.

Little is known about the artist. What information is available is derived from two anonymous letters, one of which accompanied the portfolio acquired by the Harry Stone Gallery, and a short biography included in Richard Lionel De Lisser's Picturesque Catskills, Greene County, which was first published in 1894. Because both letters contain a reference to the artists Thomas Cole, Asher Brown Durand and Daniel Huntington describing them as "modern" painters, they have been dated to the mid-nineteenth century. According to these documents, Miss Willson and her "friend," Miss Brundage (also spelled Brundidge), left Connecticut in about 1810 to settle in the town of Greenville, Greene County, New York. The couple purchased a few acres and built a log cabin. Apparently, with the aid of her neighbors, Brundage farmed the land while Willson painted pictures, "which she sold to the farmers and others as rare and unique works of art." According to the two letters, her work was purchased by patrons from Canada to Mobile, Alabama. The author of these letters has been tentatively identified by De Lisser and Greene County historian Mabel Parker Smith as Theodore L. Prevost, a cousin of the artist Thomas Cole by marriage; the art historian N. F. Karlins, however, has suggested that Theodore Alexander Cole, the son of the artist and owner of two of Willson's watercolors, composed the letters.

Stylistically, Willson's paintings are the work of an untrained hand. Her subjects are taken from popular prints of the day and are executed in bright colors made from berry juice, vegetable dye or brick dust. Her surviving oeuvre is small: in 1976, Karlins published a checklist of her known watercolors, which numbered twenty-two.

At Brundage's death, Willson is reported to have been inconsolable and to have disappeared not long afterwards. Her last known work was completed in 1825. What became of her is unknown.

== Exhibitions ==
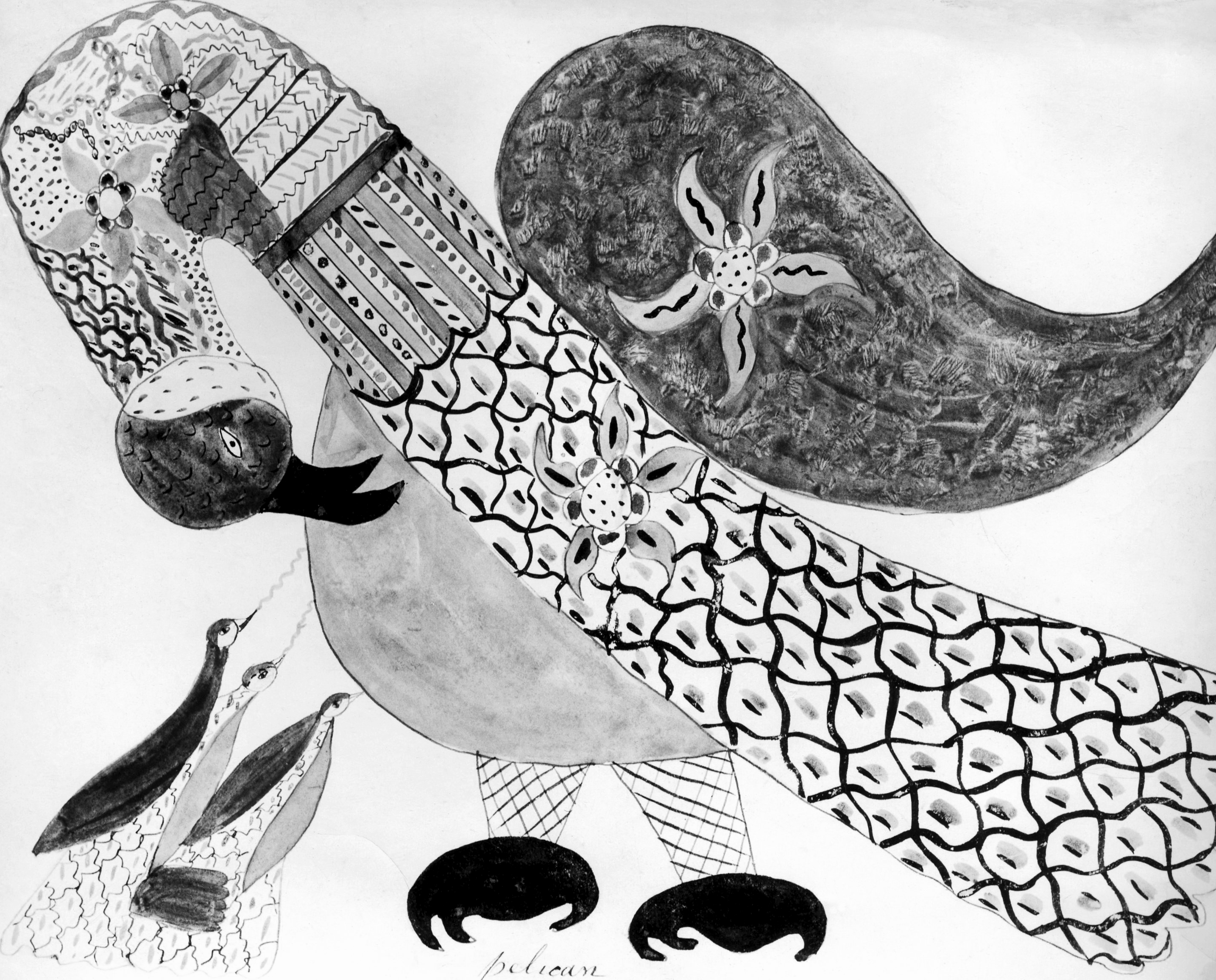
Pelican with Young, c. 1825, shown in the 1944 exhibition at the Harry Stone Gallery in New York

In 1944, the Harry Stone Gallery in New York City mounted an exhibition of sixty-seven "American Primitive" paintings that featured twenty of Willson's surviving watercolors. Willson's exhibited paintings included landscapes, still lifes, narrative scenes, portraits, mythological themes and genre subjects and demonstrated not only the range of her subject matter but also her ability, as noted by curator Jean Lipman, "to exploit pure color and design." According to Lipman, Willson "was simply endowed with a teeming imagination, a bold taste for primary color and geometric design, and a total lack of inhibition, a combination which adds up to a style close indeed to that of modern abstract art." Significantly, as Karlins has noted, there was speculation at the time of the exhibition that the watercolors were forgeries and the supporting documentation "concocted ... in order to benefit from the growing market for folk art." Karlins ultimately concluded, however, that because Willson's career is documented in De Lisser's 1894 publication and works attributed to the artist are recorded in the collection of Theodore Cole, the exhibited watercolors were authentic. He writes that although "there are many questions still to be answered about the origins of and influences on Mary Ann Willson's works ... one thing is certain—[the paintings] are not twentieth-century fakes. They are the product of one of the most original early nineteenth-century folk watercolorists yet discovered."

== In popular culture ==
Willson's life and relationship with Brundage served as the basis for Isabel Miller's 1969 novel A Place for Us, which was republished in 1971 as Patience and Sarah, as well as a 1998 opera by Paula M. Kimper.
