= Leslie Kanes Weisman =

American architecture educator, activist and community planner

Leslie Kanes Weisman (born 1945) is an American architecture educator, activist and community planning department official. Weisman was one of the founding faculty members of the New Jersey Institute of Technology School of Architecture in Newark, New Jersey. She was also one of the founders of the Women's School of Planning and Architecture.

== Life ==
Weisman was born in 1945. She was an assistant professor at University of Detroit from 1968 to 1975. Weisman joined the faculty at New Jersey Institute of Technology in 1975 as an associate professor of architecture. She served as associate dean from 1984 to 1985 and was promoted to professor of architecture in 1998. Weisman was a visiting professor of women's studies at Brooklyn College in 1980.

She was involved with Heresies 11, "Making Room: Women and Architecture". She has been instrumental in creating and promoting universal design applications for design practice and pedagogical models for design teaching.

She retired around 2000, and moved to Southold, New York, where she has played an instrumental role on the local zoning commission.

== Selected works ==
=== Books ===
- Weisman, Leslie (1992). Discrimination by Design: A Feminist Critique of the Man-made Environment. University of Illinois Press. ISBN 978-0-252-01849-7.
- Agrest, Diana; Weisman, Leslie; Conway, Patricia, eds. (1996). Sex of Architecture. Contributors: Beatriz Colomina, Diana Balmori, Jennifer Bloomer, Joan Ockman. Harry N. Abrams. ISBN 978-0-8109-2683-7.

=== Journal articles ===
- Weisman, Leslie Kanes. Our Architecture Ourselves, On The Issues Magazine (Winter 2009).
- Interview with Cristina Cerulli and Florian Kossak, "Educator, Activist, Politician', field: a free journal for architecture, 3 (2009)
- "Women's Environmental rights." Making Room: Women and Architecture. Heresies no. 11 (1981: 6-8).
- Weisman, Leslie Kanes and Noel Phyllis Birkby. "Women's Fantasy Environment: Notes on a Project in Process." Heresies 2(May 1977): 116-117.
- "Patriarchitecture and Feminist Fantasies." Liberation 19, no 8 & 9 (Spring 1976): 45-52.
- "A Woman Built Environment: Constructive Fantasies, Quest 2, no. 1 (Summer 1975): 7-18.
