= Alma Routsong =

American writer of lesbian fiction

- Born: November 26, 1924; Traverse City, Michigan, U.S.
- Died: October 4, 1996 (aged 71); Poughkeepsie, New York, U.S.
- Education: Michigan State University
- Writing career
- Pen name: Isabel Miller
- Genre: Lesbian fiction

Alma Routsong (November 26, 1924 – October 4, 1996) was an American novelist best known for her lesbian fiction, published under the pen name Isabel Miller.

== Early life ==
Alma Routsong was born Elma Louise Routsong in Traverse City, Michigan, on November 26, 1924. Her father, Carl Routsong, was a police sergeant, and her mother, Esther Miller Routsong, was a nurse. She had an older brother Richard and a younger brother Gary.

Routsong attended Traverse City Senior High School, where she was on a college preparatory track. She was the senior class president and participated in several other organizations including the National Honor Society. As an adolescent, Routsong read lesbian fiction including Radclyffe Hall's The Well of Loneliness, and Djuna Barnes' Nightwood.

During World War II, Routsong served in the WAVES. She trained at the Farragut, Idaho, Naval Training Center before working as a hospital apprentice. After leaving the WAVES, she graduated from Michigan State University in 1949 with a degree in art.

== Literary career ==
Routsong began her literary career in 1953 with the publication of her first novel, A Gradual Joy. She followed the success of this book with Round Shape in 1959. Both books were mainstream and lacked lesbian content; however, they were autobiographical and captured "her seemingly happy heterosexual married life."

In 1969, Routsong self-published A Place for Us under the pseudonym Isabel Miller. She used her own Bleecker Street Press imprint—named after her shared apartment with Elizabeth Deran on Bleecker Street—after numerous rejections from mainstream publishers. Routsong based this novel on the 1820s relationship between folk painter Mary Ann Willson and Florence Brundage. It was her first explicitly lesbian work.

Routsong and Deran sold copies of the book outside Daughters of Bilitis meetings. As the book increased in popularity, McGraw-Hill took notice and republished it as Patience and Sarah in 1972. For each of her subsequent works, Routsong continued to use the name Isabel Miller, a combination of an anagram of "Lesbia" and her mother's maiden name.

Between 1968 and 1971 Routsong worked as an editor at Columbia University.

In 1971, the Gay, Lesbian, Bisexual, and Transgender Round Table of the American Library Association created the first award for LGBTQ+ books, now known as the Stonewall Book Award, which celebrates books of exceptional merit that relate to LGBTQ+ issues. Patience and Sarah was the first winner.

From the mid-1970s until 1986 Routsong was a proofreader for Time magazine.

== Works ==
- Routsong, Alma (1953). A Gradual Joy. Boston: Houghton Mifflin Company.
- Routsong, Alma (1959). Round Shape. Boston: Houghton Mifflin Company.
- Miller, Isabel (1969). A Place for Us. New York: Bleecker Street Press. Republished as Miller, Isabel (1971). Patience and Sarah. New York: McGraw-Hill.
- Miller, Isabel (1986). The Love of Good Women. Tallahassee, FL: Naiad Press. ISBN 9780930044817.
- Miller, Isabel (1990). Side by Side. Tallahassee, FL: Naiad Press.
- Miller, Isabel (1993). A Dooryard Full of Flowers: and Other Short Pieces. Tallahassee, FL: Naiad Press. ISBN 9781562800291.
- Miller, Isabel (1996). Laurel. Tallahassee, FL: Naiad Press. ISBN 9781562801465.

== Critical reception ==
=== Reviews ===
- "After the G.I. Wedding" (review of A Gradual Joy), The New York Times, August 23, 1953
- "When Mother Moved In" (review of Round Shape), The New York Times, September 6, 1959
- "Their Love Was a Thing Apart" (review of Patience and Sarah), The New York Times, April 23, 1972

=== Awards ===
- Friends of American Writers award (1954, for A Gradual Joy)
- Bread Loaf Writers' Conference fellow (1957, for Round Shape)
- American Library Association Stonewall Book Award (1971, for Patience and Sarah)

== Activism ==
Routsong joined the gay liberation movement in 1970 and was an officer in the New York chapter of Daughters of Bilitis. She was arrested during a DOB police raid.

She and Sidney Abbott, Kate Millett, Phyllis Birkby, and Artemis March were among the members of CR One, the first lesbian-feminist consciousness-raising group.

Barbara Gittings staffed a kissing booth at the national convention of the American Library Association in Dallas in 1971, underneath the banner "Hug a Homosexual", with a "women only" side and a "men only" side. When no one took advantage of it, she and Routsong kissed in front of rolling television cameras. In describing its success, despite most of the reaction being negative, Gittings said, "We needed to get an audience. So we decided, let's show gay love live. We were offering free—mind you, free—same-sex kisses and hugs. Let me tell you, the aisles were mobbed, but no one came into the booth to get a free hug. So we hugged and kissed each other. It was shown twice on the evening news, once again in the morning. It put us on the map."

== Personal life ==
Alma married Bruce Brodie in 1947 and they had four daughters; Natalie (1949), Joyce (1952), Charlotte (1954), and Louise (1958). In 1962, Routsong met Elizabeth Deran at a church event and entered into a romantic relationship with her. Brodie and Routsong divorced in the same year.

When the pair's relationship became known, Deran was forced to leave her job with the United States Treasury Department. Routsong and Deran then moved to Greenwich Village in New York City.

Routsong struggled with alcoholism in the 1970s as her relationship with Deran came to an end. The pair rekindled their friendship in the early 1980s, and Deran motivated Routsong to write more books.

Routsong developed an interest in spiritualism and enjoyed making astrological charts of the women in her life. She also spent time at Kate Millett's Women's Art Colony Farm.

Later in life, Routsong shared a relationship with artist Julie Weber.

== Death ==
Routsong died of ovarian cancer at age 71 in Poughkeepsie, New York on October 4, 1996.
