= Women's School of Planning and Architecture =

American educational program

The Women's Schools of Planning and Architecture (WSPA) was a program designed to support women in fields like architecture, planning, and environmental design. From 1976 to 1981, the program hosted sessions that brough women together to learn and collaborate. The program was dedicated to participant's personal and professional growth. WSPA was founded by Katrin Adam, Ellen Perry Berkeley, Noel Phyllis Birkby, Bobbie Sue Hood, Marie I. Kennedy, Joan Forrester Sprague, and Leslie Kanes Weisman.

== History ==
WSPA was originally founded in 1974 for a two-week event where only female architect can attend. This event was too create a non-hierarchical environment to promote collaboration and to make the design field to be more inclusive to women. Eventually, the program broadened it's missions to address wider social justice issues. The founders used their professional experiences and social advantages to support projects like housing for low-income single parents, many of them were women from marginalized communities.

== Founding ==
The founders met through professional organizations for women architects and planners (beginning in 1972) and attendance at the first U.S. conferences on women in architecture in 1974 and 1975. According to the 1975 WSPA brochure, these opportunities to meet and share experiences with other women professionals led them to a conviction that an alternative educational experience would be a valuable way to address the "shared common goals and interests not being met within the existing professional contexts."

The same brochure describes the founders goals:

...to create a personally supportive atmosphere and a stimulating exchange of ideas in a vacation setting. We hope to encourage both personal and professional growth through a fuller integration of our values and identities as women with our values and identities as designers. Our aim is to create a forum within which we may discover and define the particular qualities, concerns, and abilities that we as women bring to the environmental design professions.

— Women's School of Planning and Architecture, 1975 WSPA brochure

Noel Birkby is an American architect and a feminist activist. She played a big role in environmental design. As a co-founder of the Women's Schools of Planning and Architecture she helped create a space for women in the design field. Birkby focused on the idea of the dismodernist ethos, using it to show how design can restrict and control the way people move through spaces, especially for women. Through the WSPA's summer workshops Birkby, along with Leslie Kanes Weisman, addressed how disability was a universal issue through spatial design thinking. She viewed domestic space as a starting point for change, encouraging women to rethink and redesign their everyday environments as a way to challenge broader systems of power.

Leslie Kanes Weisman views education not simply as learning facts, but as a shared process where women understand themselves through each other and their ability to shape change. She emphasizes that women need to understand who they are, the communities they belong to, and how society has shaped their identity, in doing so, individuals are able to locate themselves within a larger sense of community. At WSPA, Weisman helped frame feminist architectural education by documenting women's historical and personal contributions to the built environment, from professional designers to everyday women shaping domestic spaces.

== Mission and purpose ==
WSPA was designed as a form of organization providing a style of educational experience that incorporated feminist principles in form as well as content. The workshops involved participation from both women architects and low-income women, who engaged with the design processes in different ways. While the low-income participants did not approach the drawing exercises in the same creative way as the architects, they gained experience, a sense of involvement in the process, and formed lasting social connections. The workshops challenged the hierarchical structures in architecture offices through collaborative, non-hierarchical systems. This structure encouraged creativity, initiative, and a shared responsibility.

The School aimed to attract participants from diverse backgrounds and geographic locations by making an interest in environmental design the only admission "requirement" and by holding each session at a different location. Tuition was kept to a minimum and work-study scholarships were available. While the focus of the earlier sessions could be characterized as "consciousness raising, skill building, and [theoretical discussion]" among women who were primarily professionals and academics, in its latter years WSPA was moving toward involvement in political activism based on collaboration with "grassroots women."

According to co-founders Noel Phyllis Birkby and Leslie Kanes Weisman, all participants in WSPA were considered members of a peer group "equally responsible and equally capable of making a contribution". Sessions were planned by a group of Coordinators who were essentially self-selected, based on their willingness and ability to devote the time and energy necessary to bring off a successful session. The Coordinators were paid through income generated by tuition fees.

== Curriculum and sessions ==
WSPA wanted to create a new system of design and planning education. It was meant to be different from traditional architecture schools, focusing on reforming and rethinking how architecture is taught. The school aimed to challenge the standard professional norms such as hierarchy, intellectual detachment, emotional distance, and separation from users in the design process. The structure was intended to connect people and architecture in the design process. They understood that architecture impacts real communities, so it should be more engaged and responsive to the communities it's designed for. The purpose of the school was to change the entire system of architecture and to influence the profession itself, not just in the school and students. The curriculum was designed to offer subject matter unavailable in standard academic or professional settings and particularly emphasized skills that were not valued in male-dominated architectural firms. Courses were conducted by methods designed to "eliminate some of the effects of male-defined and identified educations." Instructors emphasized "the active participation of all members of the group, minimizing the role of the coordinators as experts or authorities," while maximizing their "roles as information sources and organizers".

There were five WSPA sessions in all: at St. Joseph's College, Biddeford, Maine, in 1975; at Stephenson College in Santa Cruz, California, in 1976; at Roger Williams College in Bristol, Rhode Island, in 1978; at Regis College in Denver, Colorado, in 1979; and a weekend symposium in Washington, D.C., in 1981. A session planned and advertised for 1980 at Hood College in Frederick, Maryland, was cancelled when registration targets were not met.

WSPA hosted a national women's symposium "Community-Based Alternatives and Women in the Eighties" from May 17–20, 1981 at American University, Washington, DC. The event focused on women in the areas of housing, employment, economic development, education and cooperative development. Despite ongoing efforts, WSPA's final project was a 1983-1984 Design Arts Grant from the National Endowment for the Arts (NEA) for "Architectural Quality in Urban Homesteading," a project with a stated aim to help urban homesteaders, many of whom where women, "achieve architectural quality in buildings rehabilitated and cooperatively owned and managed by homesteaders through a participatory design process."

WSPA programming focused on reforming the design professions to include women. Courses like "Demystification of Tools in Relation to Design" taught by Katrin Adam, emphasized practical skills, and courses such as "Women and the Built Environment: Personal, Social, and Professional Perceptions," taught by Birkby and others, encouraging women to consider broader issues of significance to women in built and symbolic environments. The participants who brought children to the two-week program where provided with childcare arranged through a work study program on each campus.

== Legacy ==
Though WSPA remained a legal corporation after the final session in 1981, no additional sessions came to fruition. Internal struggles developed, the School was perpetually short of money, and, probably most importantly, no group of Coordinators came forward to take on the challenge of planning a session.

In a 1989 piece on WSPA for the book Architecture: A Place for Women, Leslie Kanes Weisman described it as a product of its time, ideal for "the consciousness-raising task of defining problems," but less useful for "designing and implementing solutions."
