= Patience and Sarah =

1969 historical fiction novel

- First edition (original title)
- Author: Isabel Miller
- Original title: A Place For Us
- Cover artist: Mary Ann Willson
- Language: English
- Genre: Lesbian fiction, historical novel
- Publisher: Bleecker Street Press
- Publication date: 1969 (under the title A Place for Us)
- Publication place: United States
- Pages: 192
- ISBN: 0-449-21007-3
- OCLC: 21528554

Patience and Sarah is a 1969 historical fiction novel with strong lesbian themes by Alma Routsong, using the pen name Isabel Miller. It was originally self-published under the title A Place for Us and eventually found a publisher as Patience and Sarah in 1971.

Routsong's novel is based on a real-life painter named Mary Ann Willson who lived with her companion Miss Brundage as a "farmerette" in the early 19th century in Greene County, New York. Routsong said she came upon Willson's work in a folk art museum in Cooperstown and was inspired to write the story after reading the description of Willson and Brundage. It tells the story of two women in Connecticut in 1816 who fall in love and decide to leave their homes to buy a farm in another state or territory and live in a Boston marriage. The story addresses the limited opportunities and roles of women in early America, gender expression, and the interpretation of religion in everyday life.

Sarah Waters, author of Tipping the Velvet and other historical novels with lesbian themes, has said that this book was an influence on her writing. She received the book from a girlfriend in 1988 at age 22 and was "struck by the lyricism and economy of it, by its gentle humour, and by its sexiness."

== Plot summary ==
The story is told in switching first-person narratives between Patience and Sarah. The first part is told by Patience White, a woman of considerable means compared to others in her town. Her father died and left her enough money that she would not have to marry to be cared for. She lives with her brother and his wife and children, in a room she has to herself, something her sister-in-law Martha considers an unnatural privilege. Patience paints Biblical scenes as a pastime, and helps Martha with the children sometimes. They do not get along well.

Patience has known of Sarah Dowling for a while since Sarah is a scandalous character to some, wearing pants and doing men's work. Sarah has a family of sisters and her father trained her to do men's work since he had no sons. Intrigued one day when Sarah delivers firewood to the White household, and to flout Martha, Patience invites Sarah into her part of the house and socializes with her. Sarah divulges that she plans to set out by herself and go west and buy her own farm. Not having the heart to tell her that she will not have the opportunity to do it, Patience indulges Sarah and tells her she wants to come along. In the midst of planning the trip west, Sarah admits she feels for Patience, and although too aware of the danger, Patience also admits her attraction for Sarah.

Sarah returns to her much poorer home, where she lives with her large family in a one-room cabin. She tells her sister Rachel that she's going west with Patience as her mate, and Rachel, upset by being replaced to go west by Patience, tells their father. He beats Sarah, then drags her to Patience's home to demand to know the nature of their relationship. Faced with having to admit their acts in front of witnesses, Patience denies she feels anything for Sarah and claims that it was all a game.

The narrative switches to Sarah's perspective as she cuts off all her hair, renames herself "Sam", takes an axe and walks west alone, healing from the beatings her father gave her (no harm meant, he says). After a few experiences that demonstrate the risks of freedom, Sam takes up with a traveling preacher named Parson. He goes from town to town selling books in a horse-drawn rig he sleeps in. He teaches Sam to defend himself against boys in towns, to cook, about the Bible and other cultures, but most importantly, to read. In time, Parson admits he is attracted to Sam and when he tries to seduce Sam, Sarah admits her true identity.

Away about six months, Sarah heads home again as Parson heads towards New York, his home. Patience arrives the next day to casually invite her to Sunday dinner. Sarah accepts, and their relationship starts again after Patience admits she lost her courage. They carry on their relationship, Sarah visiting Patience on Sundays, sometimes bringing a sister or her mother. But when they are caught by Martha embracing with their bodices open, Patience's brother tells them it is time for them to go.

They head to New York City with brother Edward's blessing. Thinking Sarah is lower-class, a man on the ship assaults her, but Patience rescues her and teaches her the necessary points of being a lady. They lodge with the captain and in their first locked room alone, consummate their relationship. They meet up with Parson again and decide that Greene County in upstate New York will be their destination, where land is cheap and they can live in peace.

They arrive in Greene County and they negotiate the purchase of a small farm, plant their crop and begin their life together.

== Distribution and sale of the book ==
Routsong originally published 1,000 copies of the book using her own money, selling them on street corners in New York City and at meetings of the Daughters of Bilitis. She contacted Gene Damon (Barbara Grier) at The Ladder, who also promoted the book in the book review section of the magazine, calling it "a gem" and that, "it very much belongs with that small bookshelf full of basic classics of Lesbian literature." Grier also had to assure their readership, who had to order the book directly from Routsong, that she was an actual person, not a police agency. Routsong then resubmitted the novel to publishers under a pseudonym.

== Awards and recognition ==
- Following its October 1971 publication, the novel was the first ever to be recognized with a Stonewall Book Award.
- In 1999 Patience and Sarah was listed #24 on the Publishing Triangle's list of 100 Best Lesbian and Gay Novels.

== Adaptations ==
The novel was adapted into an opera by Paula M. Kimper, to a libretto by Wende Persons. It debuted at the Lincoln Center Festival in 1998, and has been revived several times since. Alma Routsong gave her approval to the project shortly before her death, but did not survive to hear more than a few songs from the score performed privately. The idea for the opera originated with Persons's crush on a soprano in 1981, when Persons wrote the music to impress her. When she was rejected, she kept the work until she met Kimper in 1989. They fell in love and worked together to revive the opera, completing it and guiding it successfully to the Lincoln Center in 1998.

Concerning the 1996 pre-premiere of the semi-staged final draft, with piano accompaniment, The New York Times claimed it had "an accessible, attractively lyrical score" and that, "Sarah has a gorgeous, Ravelian aria at the start of the second act." The 1998 premiere of the completed work was also well reviewed: The Opera News claimed "the opera bubbles with glorious vocal writing" and the best parts were the duets between Patience and Sarah, but that Parson Peel's music actually stole the show.

The novel was adapted into a screenplay titled "Greener Pastures" by Lindsay Gambini in 2009. The screenplay was awarded an Honorable Mention in the 2010 One in Ten Screenplay Contest and was a semifinalist in the Great Gay Screenplay contest sponsored by Pride Films and Plays. A reading of the screenplay was performed in New York City sponsored by the National Academy of Television Arts and Sciences on June 15, 2009.
