= Dreams of India =

ZBS Foundation radio drama story

- Genre: Comedy drama
- Running time: 2 hours 3 minutes
- Country of origin: United States
- Language(s): English
- Starring: Robert Lorick
- Written by: Thomas Lopez
- Directed by: Thomas Lopez
- Recording studio: United States
- Original release: 1992
- Website: http://www.zbs.org/

Jack Flanders chronology
Dreams of the Amazon (1992)	Dreams of India (1992)	Dreams of Bali (1992)

Dreams of India is a radio drama, produced by the ZBS Foundation. It is the seventh of the Jack Flanders adventure series and the second of the Travels with Jack sub-series. It combines elements of American culture and Old-time radio with themes of Sufism, Hindu mysticism and poetry. The drama received the AudioFile Earphone Award in 1992 for a "truly exceptional audio presentation".

== Plot ==
Jack is approached by the remarkably beautiful and captivating Kamala who wishes to speak to him on behalf of her aunt who, restless and troubled, needs the help of a charming man she met forty years ago who knew that one day, many years later, she would need his help and thus he gave her his card. Now that time has come, so she sends her niece with the aged and faded card to New York to find this man, someone called Jack Flanders.

And so Jack is off on another adventure via New Delhi, Bombay and Bangalore to an old and crumbling painted palace within which a presence dwells. A presence that has a few surprises in store for Mr. Flanders.

== Themes ==
The entire Travels with Jack series employs field recordings and extended dialogue to explore mind-body themes and political topics. Dreams of India, in particular, addresses India's colonial past. Quotes from Bengali poet Rabindranath Tagore function like proverbs throughout.

== Quotes ==
Jack: "Right! Body or no body, let's get out of here."

== Credits ==
- Jack Flanders - Robert Lorick
- Kamala Shukla - Sakina Jaffrey
- Lalitha Chatterjee - Madhur Jaffrey
- Ramchandra - Sohrab Ardeshir
- Additional Characters - Hesh Malkar
- Executive Producer - Thomas Manuel Lopez
- Story & Script - Meatball Fulton
- Additional ideas - Marcia Dale Lopez
- Additional Music - Tim Clark
- Director - T. Lopez
- Engineers - Robert Harrari and Fulton
- Illustration - Alan Okamoto
- Graphics - Jaye Oliver

North Indian Bamboo Flute, composed and performed by John Berdy from Journey to Qayyum, Nerverland Records.

"Production was made possible through grants from the National Endowment for the Arts, and donations from people like you, maybe even be you. Thank you."

"For words of inspiration, a special thanks to Sathya Sai Baba, Paramahansa Yogananda, Rabindranath Tagore and Roy Eugene Davis. Also thanks to the Tibetan master, Djuhal Khul. Additional moral support was provided by Sid's Ashram and Grill. Dedicated to the memory of Swami Rudinandra, affectionately known to us as Rudi."

== Travels with Jack ==
Dreams of India is the second drama in the Travels with Jack series. All of the installments in the series are entitled Dreams of... although ZBS produced two others with a similar title, Dreams of Rio and Dreams of the Blue Morpho, which are not part of the series.

Each story involves main character Jack being approached by a beautiful woman who asks for his help. In three of them he is sitting in a restaurant, eating alone, when this happens.

The dramas in the Travels with Jack series are:

- Dreams of the Amazon (1992)
- Dreams of India (1992)
- Dreams of Bali (1992)
- Dreams of Sumatra (1993)
