= Midnight at the Casa Luna =

ZBS Foundation radio drama story

- Genre: Comedy drama
- Running time: 2 hours 4 minutes
- Country of origin: United States
- Language(s): English
- Starring: Robert Lorick
- Written by: Thomas Lopez
- Directed by: Thomas Lopez
- Narrated by: Kirby Airs
- Recording studio: United States
- Original release: 1998/2000
- No. of episodes: 2
- Website: http://www.zbs.org/

Jack Flanders chronology
The Mystery of Jaguar Reef (1996)	Midnight at the Casa Luna (1998 / 2000)	Return to Inverness (2000)

Midnight at the Casa Luna is a radio drama, produced by the ZBS Foundation. The two parts of the story were released individually in 1998 and 2000; part two has the title The Hungry Ghosts. It is the eleventh of the Jack Flanders adventure series, and combines elements of Americana and Old-time radio with metaphysical concepts such as Sufi wisdom and Tibetan Buddhism.

== Plot ==
One evening Jack Flanders is wandering the streets of New York, close to his home, when he notices a tree-lined street he'd never seen before. Down this street lies an interesting looking coffee shop called The Casa Luna. Jack enters and finds himself talking to the Balinese waitress, Nani, about another Casa Luna that Jack had visited whilst in Bali. A mysterious woman, Nina, arrives and persuades Jack to come with her, leading him to a journey through the dream-like dimensions of higher realities. Along the way they are joined by Leela, an Infrit ("They don't like being called demons!") and Jack's uncle, Sir Henry Jowls from The Fourth Tower of Inverness, and try to capture a large magical green stone - the source of the dangerous and infamous Dragon Lady, Madame Zee's power.

The second part of the story finds Jack back in New York, searching in vain to find the Casa Luna again. When a strange being appears, threatening him, the Casa Luna comes to the rescue and once again he joins forces with Sir Henry Jowls and the Leela - although they are a different Sir Henry and Leela with no memory of the events in Part One. Jack persuades them to help return the green stone to the sacred city of Merkahbah - as his dreams have been telling him so to do.

== Notes & Themes ==
This adventure marked a return to many of the middle-eastern and metaphysical themes missing since the earliest stories and it ends with a phone call requesting Jack to Return to Inverness. Much of the voyage in Part Two, through the land of the Hungry Ghosts, is a re-working of Jack's last journey in The Fourth Tower of Inverness.

At some point between The Ah-Ha Phenomenon - where Sir Seymour still refers to his brother as Lord Jowls - and this adventure, Lord Henry Jowls has become Sir Henry Jowls.

Sir Henry refers to Jack's previous relationship with an Infrit called Layla Oolupi which did not end well and Leela also cites this as the reason for Jack resisting her own charms. This relationship presumably occurred after the events of Moon Over Morocco where Layla appears to Jack and helps him. There was a more malevolent Oolupi who tried (and almost succeeded) in seducing Jack during his travels inside The Fourth Tower of Inverness.

There is also evidence that once again Jack is being manipulated. Sir Henry and Madame Zee, in particular, seem to be playing roles in order to push Jack in a certain direction - much as others pushed him in The Fourth Tower of Inverness.

During this story Jack is reminded of a Casa Luna cafe that he visited whilst in Ubud, Bali - i.e. during Dreams of Bali. While there is no mention of a Casa Luna in that story, there is a Nani working at the Cafe Wayan. Both Nanis are played by Pheobe Moon but there is no recognition between the characters. The Casa Luna Nani is aware of the 'other' Casa Luna in Ubud and Sir Henry mentions that the cafe exists in many locations at once.

There appears to be some collusion between Nina and Nani. They clearly know each other quite well but down-play this to Jack. Both help him but neither are very forthcoming with explanations as to what is happening. It may not be a coincidence that their names are anagrams of each other.

== Quotes ==
Nani: "Oh! You never find the Casa Luna, Mr Jack. The Casa Luna finds you..."

Jack: "How did you know I was here?"
Madame Zee: "Do you really know where here is?"

== Credits ==
- Jack Flanders - Robert Lorick
- Nani - Phoebe Moon
- Nina - Gy Munoz
- Madame Zee - Virginia Rambal
- Narrator - Kirby Airs

Part One

- Leela - Ana Veronica Munoz
- Sir Henry Jowls - Bill Hufnagle

Part Two

- Leela - Gloria Leyva
- Sir Henry Jowls - Art Fairbain

Crew

- Director - Thomas Lopez (aka Meatball Fulton)
- Music - Tim Clark
- Script - Thomas Lopez
- Graphics - Jaye Oliver
- Illustration - Greg Tucker

Voices recorded at BackPocket Studios in New York City. Production mixed at ZBS Froggy Acres.

This project was funded by the Friends and Fans of ZBS and special thanks to John Romkey.
