= The Mystery of Jaguar Reef =

ZBS Foundation radio drama story

- Genre: Comedy drama
- Running time: 2 hours 6 minutes
- Country of origin: United States
- Language(s): English
- Starring: Robert Lorick
- Written by: Thomas Lopez
- Directed by: Thomas Lopez
- Recording studio: United States
- Original release: 1996
- Website: http://www.zbs.org/

Jack Flanders chronology
Dreams of Sumatra (1993)	The Mystery of Jaguar Reef (1996)	Midnight at the Casa Luna (1998 / 2000)

The Mystery of Jaguar Reef is a radio drama, produced in 1996 by the ZBS Foundation. It is the tenth of the Jack Flanders adventure series. It combines elements of American culture and Old-time radio with themes of pirates and aliens.

== Plot ==
Jack gets a call from his old friend Carmen (from Dreams of Rio) and is very concerned about her friend, Cassie, who it seems has become a "walk-in" while they were on holiday in Belize. She has left her body and a total stranger has moved-in. Sounds like the sort of problem only Jack Flanders can help with, except he seems to find the new Cassie very captivating. Soon others are changing too - and it always seems to happen after they've hired the genial Captain Coco to take them diving around Jaguar Reef. Between a ship-load of cosmic Popeyes, a barrel of ancient and highly potent Viper Rum and some alien missionaries - Jack's got his work cut out.

== Notes & Themes ==
This is much of the feel of The Incredible Adventures of Jack Flanders in this story - plenty of pirates - ancient and modern, flying ships and mix of cosmic and reality bending occurrences.

Captain Coco refers to Jack several times as 'Captain Jack'.

This is the only Jack Flanders story to involve aliens.

== Quotes ==
Jack: "This is the next to the last straw. Hands me that can of cosmic spinach. I loves me spinach."

== Credits ==
- Jack Flanders - Robert Lorick
- Carmen - Virginia Rambal
- Cassie - Ana Veronica Munoz
- Paulina - Gy Mirano
- Antonio - Jorge Pupo
- Captain Coco - Daryl Edwards
- Dr Weiss - Leslie Raymond
- Popeyes - Bill Raymond, Romley Hotchkiss, Larry Black, Bob Adrian
- Pirate Pete - John McDonough
- Hook & Wolfgang - Bob Adrian
- Juanita - Gy Mirano
- Narrator - Dave Herman
- Producer/Director - Tom Lopez
- Story - Meatball & Marushka Fulton
- Music - Tim Clark
- Script - M Fulton
- Engineer (BackPocket) - Joe Arlotta
- Asst. Engineer (BackPocket) - Joshua Chait
- Engineer (Froggy Acres) - T. Lopez
- Front Illustration - Greg Tucker
- Graphic Design - Jaye Oliver

Voices recorded at BackPocket Studios in New York City.
Production mixed at ZBS Froggy Acres.
Sound recorded in Belize.

"This project was supported in part by a grant from the National Endowment for the Arts. Additional support was provided by friends of ZBS Foundation. Special thanks to Robert Durand and John Romkey. Also, Captain Beefheart, wherever you are."
