= The Incredible Adventures of Jack Flanders =

ZBS Foundation radio drama story

- Genre: Comedy drama
- Running time: 4 hours 52 minutes
- Country of origin: United States
- Language: English
- Starring: Robert Lorick
- Announcer: Dave Herman
- Written by: Meatball Fulton
- Directed by: Meatball Fulton
- Recording studio: United States
- Original release: 1978
- Website: http://www.zbs.org/

Jack Flanders chronology
The Ah-Ha Phenomenon (1977)	The Incredible Adventures of Jack Flanders (1978)	Dreams of Rio (1987)

The Incredible Adventures of Jack Flanders is a radio drama produced by the ZBS Foundation and Meatball Fulton. It is the fourth of the Jack Flanders adventure series.

== Plot ==
The series begins with the unexpected late-night delivery of an overstuffed green velvet armchair to Jack Flanders, courtesy of "Venus Velvet" (a person unknown to Jack). Falling asleep in this armchair draws Jack into a sometimes amusing, sometimes nightmarish dream world populated by sky pirates crewing winged sailing ships, winged reptilian "fromborks", mad sorcerers dueling in mechanical demons, tap dancing marsh wizards who assist Jack in his negotiations with the Lords of Death and more. The nominal plot line concerns the fact that Jack unintentionally causes a mustache to appear on the lip of the Black Mona Lisa, a particularly vicious pirate originally from Philadelphia. The problem begins when he looks at her image on her Wanted posters, although the effect extends to the Pirate Queen herself when Jack meets her. Jack must travel "beyond the Never Mind" in order to discover who did send him the green velvet chair, and why.

== Analysis ==
The Incredible Adventures of Jack Flanders is not a direct sequel to the preceding Jack Flanders adventures, as Return to Inverness is to The Fourth Tower of Inverness, although it does include characters from them, such as Mojo Sam, Doctor Mazoola and Little Frieda. It is also rather different from its predecessors, both in structure and content, as it lacks any significant reference to Eastern philosophy and religions, and it was designed to be broadcast in half-hour episodes rather than shorter episodes. The final episode features an extended series of 'clips' from The Fourth Tower of Inverness as each character is seen 'dreaming' previous adventures. Overall, it has a faster-paced and more straightforward storyline.

Jack recognizes some characters from The Fourth Tower of Inverness and Moon Over Morocco, but not others. Little Frieda and Doctor Mazoola are well disposed towards him, but there is no recognition on either side. When Jack first sees her, he remarks on a strange 'little girl' that appears on the ship and they introduce themselves to each other. In contrast, Jack greets Old Far-Seeing Art as an old acquaintance, and refers to their meeting one another at Inverness.

There is a running joke concerning the Mona Lisa and in particular the artist Marcel Duchamp - famous for painting a parody of the Mona Lisa with a mustache and goatee. After Jack first encounters a Wanted poster for the sky pirate 'The Black Mona Lisa' and causes a mustache to appear on her image as a result, he tries to hide his own identity by using the pseudonym of Marcel Duchamp. Later he and the 'Marquis of Carumbas' are busking in the realm of the 'Never Mind' and the Marquis introduces Jack's act as Nude Descending a Staircase, another work by Marcel Duchamp.

== Credits ==
- Jack Flanders - Robert Lorick
- Little Frieda - P.J. Orte
- Doctor Mazoola & Narrator - Dave Herman
- Captain Swallow - Owen MaGee
- Marquis of Carambas - John Wyn Evans
- Mojo Sam - Dave Adams
- The Pirate Queen - Cara Pitts
- Old Far-Seeing Art & Chief Wampum - Meatball Fulton
- Owl Eyes - Chris Henry
- Sorcerer - Paul Felzone
- Waitress - Jane Crawford
- Sailors & Pirates - Jim Lewis, Rogan English, Skip Penk, Neil Atkins, Don Chaplin, Marty Hughes, Richard Lepp & Bob.
- Written by Meatball Fulton
- Music by Tim Clark

Produced at the ZBS Studios, Fort Edward, NY

== Quotes ==
Jack: "Were you expecting me?"
Marquis of Carambas: "Oh yes, I was just poling through these slimy marshes praying that some buffoon like you would pop into my punt."

Jack: "I just keep acting like everything is real?"
Marquis of Carambas: "Yes. Just like in real life."
