= Dreams of Bali =

ZBS Foundation radio drama story

- Genre: Comedy drama
- Running time: 2 hours 5 minutes
- Country of origin: United States
- Language(s): English
- Starring: Robert Lorick
- Written by: Thomas Lopez
- Directed by: Thomas Lopez
- Recording studio: United States
- Original release: 1992
- Website: http://www.zbs.org/

Jack Flanders chronology
Dreams of India (1992)	Dreams of Bali (1992)	Dreams of Sumatra (1993)

Dreams of Bali is a radio drama, produced by the ZBS Foundation. It is the eight of the Jack Flanders adventure series and the third of the Travels with Jack sub-series. It combines elements of American culture, Old-time radio and Sufism.

== Plot ==
Jack travels to Bali to visit an old friend, Tiffany, and finds himself immersed in a saga of jealousy that extends down from the gods themselves to the mere mortals who fall under their spell. A spectral Balinese holy man helps Jack to become an avatar of Rangda, Queen of Witches in a dangerous attempt to save Tiffany from her plight.

== Notes & Themes ==
In Midnight at the Casa Luna, Jack is reminded of another Casa Luna cafe he says that he visited while in Ubud, Bali - i.e. during this story. While Dreams of Bali does not mention that cafe, there is a Nani working at the Cafe Wayan. Both Nanis are played by Phoebe Moon but there is no recognition between the characters. The Casa Luna Nani is aware of the 'other' Casa Luna in Ubud and Sir Henry mentions that the cafe exists in many locations at once.

== Quotes ==
Made: "Only the bulging eyes and twisted fang of her mask can be seen."
Jack: "I think I once dated her."
Nani: "Her tongue hang out."
Jack: "Yeah, that's her."

== Credits ==
- Jack Flanders - Robert Lorick
- Tiffany - Jana Harris
- Made - Aasif Mandviwala
- Nani - Phoebe Moon
- Man in Hotel - Baju
- Black Magic Woman - Yolande Bavan
- Wise Old Man - Felix Avacado
- Additional characters - Andre Adler, Virginia Rambal and Ruth Maleczech
- Executive Producer - Thomas Manuel Lopez
- Story & Script - Meatball Fulton
- Additional ideas plus the Wise Old Man's words - Marcia Dale Lopez
- Music - Tim Clark
- Engineers - Robert Harrari and Fulton
- Illustration - Alan Okamoto
- Graphics - Jaye Oliver

Environments and music recorded in Bali by Meatball Fulton.
Additional music and sounds (cremation, monkey chant, Balinese geese) recorded by Michael Stearns.

"Thanks to the National Endowment for the Arts, Garuda Indonesia Airlines, Garuda Orient Holidays, the Indonesian Tourist Office of North America, and Aerowisata Hotels."

== Travels with Jack ==
All of the installments in this sub-series are entitled Dreams of ... although there are two others with a similar title - Dreams of Rio and Dreams of the Blue Morpho - which are not part of it.

Each story involves Jack being approached by a beautiful woman who asks for his help. In three of them he is sitting in a restaurant, eating alone, when this happens. The fourth (Dreams of Bali), while it begins with a strange dream concerning food, starts after Jack has already accepted the invitation and been flown out.

These are the only stories in which Jack asks that someone cover his expenses.

- Dreams of the Amazon (1992)
- Dreams of India (1992)
- Dreams of Bali (1992)
- Dreams of Sumatra (1993)
