= Do That in Real Life? =

ZBS Foundation radio drama story

Do That In Real Life?
- Genre: Comedy drama
- Country of origin: United States
- Language: English
- Starring: Robert Lorick
- Written by: Thomas Lopez
- Directed by: Thomas Lopez
- Recording studio: United States
- Original release: 2003
- Website: http://www.zbs.org/

Jack Flanders chronology
Somewhere Next Door to Reality (2002)	Do That in Real Life? (2003)	The Eye of Van Gogh (2003)

Do That In Real Life? is a radio drama, produced by the ZBS Foundation. It is the fifteenth of the Jack Flanders adventure series and the third of the Travelling Jack sub-series. It combines elements of Old-time radio with psychic phenomena, supernatural beings and energies.

== Plot ==
Jack is having a nightmare of being chased by a zombie when Mojo calls. Mojo's playing piano at Frenchie's in New Orleans and needs Jack to help him with some real life zombie problems in the city. Almost immediately after his arrival in New Orleans, Jack draws the attention of a shape-shifting voodoo princess who may in fact be something even more dangerous from his past! Dealing with Dominique and a wandering zombie are the least of his worries.

== Notes & Themes ==
There are a number of references to Jack's prior relationship with an Infrit, Layla Oolupi. Sophia, or the entity who entered her, knows many of the details of Jack's adventures in Morocco and claims to be someone that Jack loved and then abandoned, breaking her heart in the process. Mojo asks Madame Ebbo, who describes the being in such a way that Jack clearly identifies it as Layla but Madame Ebbo disagrees that it is her and suggests it's a rival Infrit, jealous of Layla.

This story contains an aside in which Dominique tells the tale of Le Petit Lafitte, later given a cd release of its own with three more stories.

== Quotes ==
Madame Ebbo: "Do you have another question?"
Jack: "You know, I'd love to get an answer to the first one!"

== Credits ==
- Jack Flanders - Robert Lorick
- Mojo Sam - Dave Adams
- Dominique - Lindsay Ellison
- Claudine - Pascale Poirier
- Madame Ebbo - Maryse Dejean
- Sophia - Karen Evans Candel
- The Zombie - Jim Post
- Rufus - Bill Raymond
- Waiter - Patrick Donovan
- Narrator - Kirby Airs
- Producer/Director/Engineer - Tom Lopez
- Writer - Meatball Fulton
- Music - Tim Clark
- Illustration/Graphics - Jaye Oliver
- Zombie consultant - Marushka Wolfgang Fulton
- Street Savy Consultant - Rodger Collins

Recorded and mixed at Froggy Acres, Fort Miller, NY

"Special thanks to John Romkey and to all friends of ZBS who helped make this series possible."

== Travelling Jack ==
Every Travelling Jack adventure begins with a phone call from Mojo, asking for Jack's help. Usually the call wakes Jack up. During the call, Mojo drops more and more hints as to where in the world he is. None of the adventures involve the Invisible Realms, as such.

- Dreams of the Blue Morpho (2002)
- Somewhere Next Door to Reality (2002)
- Do That in Real Life? (2003)
- The Eye of Van Gogh (2003)
