= The Ah-Ha Phenomenon =

ZBS Foundation radio drama story

- Genre: Comedy drama
- Running time: 1 hour 3 minutes
- Country of origin: United States
- Language(s): English
- Starring: Robert Lorick
- Written by: Thomas Lopez
- Directed by: Thomas Lopez
- Narrated by: Dave Herman
- Recording studio: United States
- Original release: 1977
- No. of episodes: 1
- Website: http://www.zbs.org/

Jack Flanders chronology
Moon Over Morocco (1974)	The Ah-Ha Phenomenon (1977)	The Incredible Adventures of Jack Flanders (1978)

The Ah-Ha Phenomenon is a radio drama, produced by the ZBS Foundation. Released in 1977 this is the third of the Jack Flanders adventure series, and combines elements of Americana and Old-time radio with metaphysical concepts such as Sufi wisdom and Tibetan Buddhism.

== Plot ==
Jack Flanders is approached by a mysterious research institute; the head of one of its departments, Jack's uncle Sir Seymour Jowls (brother to Lord Henry Jowls who was introduced in The Fourth Tower of Inverness) claims to have discovered the location of the fabled City of The Ah-Has, the source of the great ideas and inventions of the future, in the keeping of the higher powers, for their timely release to mankind. Sir Seymour wants Jack to go to the city and steal the Ah-Ha of the grand Unified Field Theory. Jack agrees only when it is revealed that this city is also the location of the Lotus Jukebox for which Jack sought in vain through all of his adventures inside The Fourth Tower of Inverness.

Seeking the help of Chief Wampum, Jack travels to the land of the City of Ah-Has, meeting a pesky troll and an eccentric wizard along the way before he must face the perils of the great city itself - source of the haunting music ("Angel Baby") that Jack has pursued through dimensions, demons and dire deeds...

== Notes & Themes ==
This adventure concludes Jack's travels in The Fourth Tower of Inverness, and is the adventure in which he finally locates the fabled Lotus Jukebox.

The production is made with a minimal cast and is the shortest of all the Jack Flanders stories. The CD is printed with the title The AH-HA! Phenomena but ZBS refer to it on their website and literature as The Ah-Ha Phenomenon.

Chief Wampum's role is clearly a homage, albeit a comedic one, to Don Juan Matus, the Yaqui shaman from the writings of Carlos Castaneda.

== Jukeboxes ==
During his adventures Jack Flanders encounters several jukeboxes, each with a different theme.

- Whirlitzer of Wisdom - This is the first jukebox discovered, and the only one outside of the Fourth Tower. For the price of a dime, it plays various wisdoms by people such as Ram Dass and Don Van Vliet (billed as the Venerable Van Vliet). Its name is based on the classic Wurlitzer jukebox.
- Great Green Jade Jukebox - This is the second jukebox discovered, inside the Fourth Tower. It is able to bring a city to life, replaying encounters in order. In order to reach the next step, track 2 must be played, and so on.
- Bodhisattva Jukebox - This is the final jukebox discovered inside the Fourth Tower. It features chants by Bhagavan Das, and listening to it brings understanding. The characters' heads and arms expand, in a way similar to a story of the bodhisattva canon.
- Lotus Jukebox - Source of the haunting music ("Angel Baby"). Although this is what he is searching for in The Fourth Tower of Inverness, Jack Flanders does not encounter it until The Ah-Ha Phenomenon.

== Quotes ==
Chief Wampum: "No matter what, do not holler Help-um!"

Wizard: "You want the Wizard should embellish?"

== Credits ==
- Jack Flanders - Robert Lorick
- Sir Seymour Jowls - Owen McGhee
- Cynthia, Hostess & Archivist - P.J. Orte
- Narrator & Troll - Dave Herman
- Chief Wampum & Wizard - Meatball Fulton (Thomas Lopez)
- Music - Tim Clark
- Graphics - Jaye Oliver
- Director, Script & Story - Meatball Fulton (Thomas Lopez)

This project was made possible by donations from the generous Friends & Fans of ZBS.
