= Tropical Hot Dog Night =

ZBS Foundation radio drama story

- Genre: Comedy drama
- Country of origin: United States
- Language(s): English
- Starring: Robert Lorick
- Written by: Thomas Lopez
- Directed by: Thomas Lopez
- Recording studio: United States
- Original release: 2007
- Website: http://www.zbs.org/

Jack Flanders chronology
The Ghost Islands (2006)	Tropical Hot Dog Night (2007)	The White Castle (2008)

Tropical Hot Dog Night is a radio drama, produced by the ZBS Foundation. It is the nineteenth of the Jack Flanders adventure series and the third of The Fantastic Voyages of Captain Jack Flanders sub-series. It combines elements of Old-time radio with psychic phenomena, supernatural beings and energies.

== Plot ==
The crew are sailing towards Key Milagro - also known as Key Diablo by inhabitants of the neighboring islands - where a mysterious fog descends each night and the inhabitants of Key Milagro find the color draining out of everything and being replaced by a rich, hard-boiled film noir fantasy life. The local crime bookshop owner, Johnny Seven, seems to have the answers but he's more interested in playing than talking. Sometimes, however, being dressed to kill is more than just a turn of phrase…

== Notes and themes ==
Part other-worldly tale and part homage to the film noir era of the 1940s and 50s. The title came from a song by Captain Beefheart from his album Shiny Beast (Bat Chain Puller).

== Quotes ==
Dominique: "It's you, Jack. You think I'm skinny because you have such a fat head."

Johnny: "You seem like the kind of woman who reads classics...Dostoevsky, Chekov, guys like that. It's not the kind of books I sell."
Rose: "You mean books about tough guys?"
Johnny: "That's right."
Rose: "And tough babes who appear helpless and find some sap to buy their sob story and do their dirty work for them and the next thing you know she's skipped out with the dough, he's been framed, she's south of the border sipping Margaritas and the sap is wearing striped suits in the big house. Is that what you mean?"
Johnny: "Er.... why don't you just keep on browsing."

Amanda: "You know, people say, I gotta get some work done but you never hear them say, I gotta get some fun done."

== Credits ==
- Jack Flanders - Robert Lorick
- Mojo Sam - Dave Adams
- Claudine - Pascale Poirier
- Dominique - Lindsay Ellison
- Rose - Laura Roth
- Johnny and Fritzy - Hank Heimark
- Danny - Nebadon Adams
- Wolf - Susan Brink
- Producer/Director - Tom Lopez
- Story and Script - M. Fulton
- Music - Tim Clark
- Illustration and Graphics - Jaye Oliver

Recorded at Froggy Acres Studios, Fort Miller, NY.

== Track list ==
Tropical Hot Dog Night Disc 1

- 1. Giant Jellyfishes? 9:26
- 2. The Monster May Get You! 7:26
- 3. How To Pick Up A Dame 8:32
- 4. They Call It "Key Diablo" 10:57
- 5. Dreamland Limited 7:27
- 6. And Back We Go, Yo Ho! 11:27

Tropical Hot Dog Night Disc 2

- 1. Nipping At Our Heels 7:40
- 2. The Little Voodoo Heads 7:51
- 3. Gotta Get Some Fun Done 7:26
- 4. What A Chump! 5:27
- 5. Knew What I Know 5:17
- 6. That's My Little Secret 7:18

== The Fantastic Voyages of Captain Jack Flanders ==
Jack, Mojo, Claudine and Dominique sail around the Tropics encountering mysterious and other-worldly incidents.

- Orchids and Moonbeams (2005)
- The Ghost Islands (2006)
- Tropical Hot Dog Night (2007)
- The White Castle (2008)
