= Dreams of the Amazon =

ZBS Foundation radio drama story

- Genre: Comedy drama
- Running time: 1 hour 58 minutes
- Country of origin: United States
- Language: English
- Starring: Robert Lorick
- Written by: Thomas Lopez
- Directed by: Thomas Lopez
- Recording studio: United States
- Original release: 1992
- Website: http://www.zbs.org/

Jack Flanders chronology
Dreams of Rio (1987)	Dreams of the Amazon (1992)	Dreams of India (1992)

Dreams of the Amazon is a radio drama, produced by the ZBS Foundation. It is the sixth of the Jack Flanders adventure series and the first of the Travels with Jack sub-series. It combines elements of American culture and Old-time radio with themes of lost cities, jungle exploration and shamanism. It is a loose sequel to Dreams of Rio and while it is not necessary to have heard that story first it will help to understand some of the references.

== Plot ==
Jack finds his life in New York being haunted by visions of the Crystal Skull (from Dreams of Rio) appearing to him in the form of a very beautiful woman who then proceeds to peel away her flesh to reveal the skull beneath, all the while imploring Jack to "take me home". When the skull turns up on his doorstep, he knows he's once again going to be travelling deep into the Amazon rainforest to find that legendary Lost City – which even now seems more like a dream than a reality.
Once again the sinister crook, Paulo Pompadora, seems to be at the heart of things and dodging him is just one of the problems Jack has to face as he plans his expedition up crocodile infested waters, through caves full of vampire bats and on to a city that may be one of the world's last magical places that needs visitors as much as it needs treasure-hunters with arms full of dynamite.

== Notes & Themes ==
While Dreams of Rio concentrates more on an artifact found in the Lost City, Dreams of the Amazon is about the city itself and the relationship between it and the Crystal Skull.

While this drama is set mainly in the 'real world' – Jack does travel briefly to one of the Invisible Realms that lies closely intertwined with our own.

This story reinforces the 'Jungle Jack' aspect of his character. Indeed, all of the Travels with Jack Adventures take place in tropical parts of the world.

There is a strong ecological theme running through the story illustrating man's greed leading to the destruction not only of fragile ecosystems but also to the special, magical places in the world.

== Quotes ==
Tereza: "It will eat your soul."
Jack: "God! I really hate things that eat your soul."
Tereza: "I do too."

== Credits ==
- Jack Flanders – Robert Lorick
- Tereza Cavalcanti – Ana Rosa
- Paulo Pompadora – Andre Adler
- Claudia Guedes – Claudia Zagarodne
- Terry Newman – Terry O'Reilly
- Professor Elvis – Edward Blake
- Chico – Sergio Cesario
- Executive Producer – Thomas Manuel Lopez
- Story & Script – Meatball Fulton
- Music – Tim Clark
- Director – T. Lopez
- Engineers – Robert Harrari, Fulton & Clark
- Illustration – Alan Okamoto
- Graphics – Jaye Oliver

Additional ideas plucked from the mind of Marcia Dale Lopez
Sounds recorded in Rio, the Amazon, and the Pantanal of Mato Grosso by Fulton & Clark
"Production was made possible through grants from the National Endowment for the Arts, and donations from people like you, maybe even you. Additional support was provided by Sid Ashram and Grill, home of the Big Om Burger."

== Travels with Jack ==
All of the installments in this sub-series are entitled Dreams of ... although ZBS produced two others with a similar title – Dreams of Rio and Dreams of the Blue Morpho – which are not part of the series.

Each story involves Jack being approached by a beautiful woman who asks for his help. In three of them he is sitting in a restaurant, eating alone, when this happens. The fourth, Dreams of Bali does begin with a strange dream concerning food, but starts after Jack has already accepted the invitation and been flown out.

These are the only stories in which Jack asks that his expenses be paid.

- Dreams of the Amazon (1992)
- Dreams of India (1992)
- Dreams of Bali (1992)
- Dreams of Sumatra (1993)
