= Somewhere Next Door to Reality =

ZBS Foundation radio drama story

- Genre: Comedy drama
- Country of origin: United States
- Language(s): English
- Starring: Robert Lorick
- Written by: Thomas Lopez
- Directed by: Thomas Lopez
- Recording studio: United States
- Original release: 2002
- Website: http://www.zbs.org/

Jack Flanders chronology
Dreams of the Blue Morpho (2002)	Somewhere Next Door to Reality (2002)	Do That in Real Life? (2003)

Somewhere Next Door To Reality is a radio drama, produced by the ZBS Foundation. It is the fourteenth of the Jack Flanders adventure series and the second of the Travelling Jack sub-series. It combines elements of old-time radio with psychic phenomena, supernatural beings and energies.

== Plot ==
"By not quite accepting, because they do not please us, things that are so, we spend our entire lives making meaningless gestures somewhere next door to reality." Nan Shin

Mojo is playing piano at Lucky Pierre's in Montreal and he needs Jack to help him and Dominique out. It seems that some people are fading in and out of reality while others have faded away altogether. Mojo has caught a glimpse of another city, another Montreal - vague and insubstantial but there nonetheless.

As Jack roams the streets, listening to the haunting accordion music played by a blind street musician, he notices a remarkably beautiful woman who fades in and out right in front of him. Talking to her doesn't help Jack solve his problem; in fact it gets him the name 'Cul-de-sac Jack' for his pains but he can't help being drawn to this mysterious and attractive woman who seems to live somewhere next door to reality.

== Notes and themes ==
This marks the beginning of the 'French phase' of Jack's adventures as evidenced by the inclusion of Dominique and Claudine as regular characters, and French-speaking locations. Previously there had been a strong tropical theme for the locations and characters.

This introduces a permanent love-interest for Jack, Claudine. In keeping with Jack's previous interests, she is a beautiful, mysterious and other-worldly woman.

== Quotes ==
Sam: "I read somewhere that America has the largest number of over-weight poor people in the world."
Dominique: "Of course! Your food is your country; fast, fat and no taste."

Jack: "Why is it every time I meet you I feel like I've come to a dead end?"
Claudine: "Cul-de-sac, Jack."

Shop Assistant: "You look like a famous French lyricist."
Jack: "Oh really. Which one?"
Shop Assistant: "Jacques Prévert."
Mojo: "That's right."

== Credits ==
- Jack Flanders - Robert Lorick
- Mojo Sam - Dave Adams
- Dominique - Lindsay Ellison
- Madame Ciao (Claudine) - Pascale Poirier
- Isabelle - Elisa Darrow
- Waiter - Matt Funciello
- Narrator - Kirby Airs
- Producer/Director/Engineer - Tom Lopez
- Writer - Meatball Fulton
- Music - Tim Clark
- Illustration/Graphics - Jaye Oliver
- Linguistic Consultant - Pascale Poirier

Voices recorded and mixed at Froggy Acres, Fort Miller, New York.

"Special thanks to John Romkey and to all friends of ZBS who helped to make this series possible."

== Travelling Jack ==
Every Travelling Jack adventure begins with a phone call from Mojo, asking for Jack's help. Usually the call wakes Jack up. During the phone call, Mojo drops more and more hints as to where in the world he is. None of the adventures involve the Invisible Realms, as such.

- Dreams of the Blue Morpho (2002)
- Somewhere Next Door to Reality (2002)
- Do That in Real Life? (2003)
- The Eye of Van Gogh (2003)
