= The White Castle (radio drama) =

ZBS Foundation radio drama story

- Genre: Comedy drama
- Country of origin: United States
- Language(s): English
- Starring: Robert Lorick
- Written by: Thomas Lopez
- Directed by: Thomas Lopez
- Recording studio: United States
- Original release: 2008
- Website: http://www.zbs.org/

Jack Flanders chronology
Tropical Hot Dog Night (2007)	The White Castle (2008)	Steam Dreamers of Inverness (2010)

The White Castle is a radio drama, produced by the ZBS Foundation. It is the twentieth of the Jack Flanders adventure series and the fourth of The Fantastic Voyages of Captain Jack Flanders sub-series. It combines elements of old-time radio with psychic phenomena, supernatural beings and energies.

== Plot ==
Jack and his companions enter The White Castle upon the invitation of its wealthy, eccentric and mysterious owner, Sanford White. But far from being a charming rustic folly, the fortress is full of technology and seems to have detailed information on Jack and Mojo's previous adventures. The very unusual walls have a way of showing you things about yourself that you'd rather not confront.

== Credits ==
- Jack Flanders - Robert Lorick
- Mojo Sam - Dave Adams
- Claudine - Pascale Poirier
- Dominique - Lindsay Ellison
- Rose - Sari Bobbin
- Johnny Seven - Hank Heimark
- Sanford White - John McDonough
- Zeevo - Nebadon Adams
- Producer/Director - Tom Lopez
- Story and Script - M. Fulton
- Music - Tim Clark
- Illustration and Graphics - Jaye Oliver

Environmental sounds recorded in Bali, Sumatra, India, Costa Rica, Tangier and Tunisia by Bobby Bielecki, Connie Kieltyka and Fulton and Clark.

== Track List ==
The White Castle - Disc 1

- 1. The Square Hamburger 10:25
- 2. I Am Sanford White 10:42
- 3. Isn't This Amazing 9:20
- 4. The Sumatra Room 10:16
- 5. We Are Not Alone 10:16
- 6. I Am Who You Are 7:56

The White Castle - Disc 2

- 1. Everything Has a Dark Side 9:16
- 2. White & Black 9:13
- 3. Smoking Like a Fiend 8:40
- 4. You Cannot Escape Me 4:58
- 5. Ooga Booga Jones 10:06
- 6. Okay, You're On, Boss 7:38

== The Fantastic Voyages of Captain Jack Flanders ==
Jack, Mojo, Claudine and Dominique sail around the Tropics encountering mysterious and other-worldly incidents.

- Orchids and Moonbeams (2005)
- The Ghost Islands (2006)
- Tropical Hot Dog Night (2007)
- The White Castle (2008)
