= The Eye of Van Gogh =

ZBS Foundation radio drama story

- Genre: Comedy drama
- Country of origin: United States
- Language(s): English
- Starring: Robert Lorick
- Written by: Thomas Lopez
- Directed by: Thomas Lopez
- Recording studio: United States
- Original release: 2003
- Website: http://www.zbs.org/

Jack Flanders chronology
Do That in Real Life? (2003)	The Eye of Van Gogh (2003)	Orchids and Moonbeams (2005)

The Eye of Van Gogh is a radio drama, produced by the ZBS Foundation. It is the sixteenth of the Jack Flanders adventure series and the fourth of the Travelling Jack sub-series. It combines elements of Old-time radio with psychic phenomena, supernatural beings and energies.

== Plot ==
Balls of invisible perception-altering energy are bouncing around Quebec City. Being inside one of these can be a shocking experience - no problem for a seasoned traveller of the Invisible Realms, like Jack and Mojo - but potentially mind shattering for the population at large. These balls are bubbling up from some point in the city and Jack, Mojo, Claudine and Dominique find themselves in a race against time to locate the source of this energy and put a stop to it. Help may be at hand - a little girl with pigtails, smoking a large Havana cigar has been spotted in the city - but she's proving very elusive and it's driving Jack even more crazy than Dominique usually does.

== Notes & themes ==
Dominique, who has always been a difficult character, really gives Jack a hard time in this story, ridiculing him mercilessly in front of the others.

== Quotes ==
Jack: "I do sense an odd sort of a French connection here."

Sam: "I think it split a seam."
Jack: "Reality split a seam?"
Sam: "That's right."
Jack: "Hehe, reality has seams?"
Sam: "You know that."
Jack: "Reality is only what it seems, right?"
Sam: "Maybe it is what it seems but I think it's the seems' seams that are splitting."
Jack: "You mean seems seams are seams that seem or what seems are the seams?"
Sam: "That's right."

== Credits ==
- Jack Flanders - Robert Lorick
- Mojo Sam - Dave Adams
- Dominique - Lindsay Ellison
- Claudine - Pascale Poirier
- La Petite Frieda - P.J. Orte
- Jean-Claude - Bob Sugarman
- Waiter - Patrick Donovan
- Narrator - Kirby Airs
- Producer/Director/Engineer - Tom Lopez
- Writer - Meatball Fulton
- Music - Tim Clark
- Illustration/Graphics - Jaye Oliver

Voices recorded and mixed at Froggy Acres, Fort Miller, New York

"Special thanks to John Romkey and to all friends of ZBS who helped make this series possible."

== Travelling Jack ==
Every 'Travelling Jack' adventure begins with a phone call from Mojo, asking for Jack's help. Usually the call wakes Jack up. During the phone call, Mojo drops more and more hints as to where in the world he is. None of the adventures involve the Invisible Realms, as such.

- Dreams of the Blue Morpho (2002)
- Somewhere Next Door to Reality (2002)
- Do That in Real Life? (2003)
- The Eye of Van Gogh (2003)
