= Orchids and Moonbeams =

ZBS Foundation radio drama story

- Genre: Comedy drama
- Country of origin: United States
- Language(s): English
- Starring: Robert Lorick
- Written by: Thomas Lopez
- Directed by: Thomas Lopez
- Recording studio: United States
- Original release: 2005
- Website: http://www.zbs.org/

Jack Flanders chronology
The Eye of Van Gogh (2003)	Orchids and Moonbeams (2005)	The Ghost Islands (2006)

Orchids and Moonbeams is a radio drama, produced by the ZBS Foundation. It is the seventeenth of the Jack Flanders adventure series and the first of The Fantastic Voyages of Captain Jack Flanders sub-series. It combines elements of Old-time radio with psychic phenomena, supernatural beings and energies.

== Plot ==
Construction of a new beach resort threatens a jungle valley thought to be sacred by the local people who believe that it is the domain of a powerful spirit of nature - a jungle goddess no less. It's not long before the spirit is fighting back and soon the jungle is threatening to take over the beach. Snakes and lizards are becoming the regulars at Maria's Cafe and it's up to Jack, Mojo and Claudine to try and restore balance.

== Notes & Themes ==
Jack once again returns to the tropical parts of the world for a new series of adventures with Mojo and Claudine. While she's made Jack the captain of her 35' trimaran, she's the one directing their travels.

== Quotes ==
Sam: "Why does Claudine have a boat down here?"
Jack: "She bought it."
Sam: "I thought she was in Montreal."
Jack: "I don't know where she is."
Sam: "That figures. The Montreal she's from people don't even know about and that includes the people who live in Montreal!"

== Credits ==
- Jack Flanders - Robert Lorick
- Mojo Sam - Dave Adams
- Claudine - Pascale Poirier
- Pat Patterson - Patrick Donovan
- Bunny - Camille Goodhart Hebert
- Amber - Laura Roth
- Producer/Director/Engineer - Tom Lopez
- Writer - Meatball Fulton
- Music - Tim Clark
- Illustration/Graphics - Jaye Oliver

Recorded at Froggy Acres Studios, Fort Miller, NY

== The Fantastic Voyages of Captain Jack Flanders ==
Jack, Mojo and Claudine sail around the Tropics encountering mysterious and other-worldly incidents.

- Orchids and Moonbeams (2005)
- The Ghost Islands (2006)
- Tropical Hot Dog Night (2007)
- The White Castle (2008)
