= The Ghost Islands =

ZBS Foundation radio drama story

- Genre: Comedy drama
- Country of origin: United States
- Language(s): English
- Starring: Robert Lorick
- Written by: Thomas Lopez
- Directed by: Thomas Lopez
- Recording studio: United States
- Original release: 2006
- Website: http://www.zbs.org/

Jack Flanders chronology
| Orchids and Moonbeams (2005) | The Ghost Islands (2006) | Tropical Hot Dog Night (2007) |

The Ghost Islands is a radio drama, produced by the ZBS Foundation. It is the eighteenth of the Jack Flanders adventure series and the second of the Fantastic Voyages of Captain Jack Flanders sub-series. It combines elements of old-time radio with psychic phenomena, supernatural beings and energies.

== Plot ==
While relaxing at the Pelican's Pouch in the small Caribbean town of San Miguel, rumors reach Jack and Mojo of the mysterious Ghost Islands which appear and disappear at certain times of the year. Many can see the islands but most just don't. Claudine knows more but is being particularly vague and distant; she does, however, decide that they could use another crew-member and to Jack's chagrin, it's Dominique. Pretty soon, there are 'fuzzy' cocoon shapes moving around, shapes whose home can only be the mysterious Ghost Islands.

== Notes and themes ==
Continues the ecological theme that tourists coming to visit places of beauty or magic, by their very presence, help to destroy such places. Also there are a number of Loa references.

== Quotes ==
Rose: "Sometimes things are as solid as we are willing to allow them to be."
Mojo: "That applies to everything we believe in."
Rose: "Unless you try to sit on it!"

Mojo: "Bunny doesn't look happy."
Jack: "Oh well. You know... teenagers."
Mojo: "Thought they called them 'young adults'?"
Jack: "Yeah. I don't know why."

== Credits ==
- Jack Flanders - Robert Lorick
- Mojo Sam - Dave Adams
- Claudine - Pascale Poirier
- Dominique - Lindsay Ellison
- Rose and Madame Jamal - Laura Roth
- Bunny - Camille Goodhart Hebert
- Una and Fast Freddie - Nebadon Adams
- Joseph - Joseph Gerrick
- Georgette - Linda Malenga
- Producer/Director/Engineer - Tom Lopez
- Writer - Meatball Fulton
- Music - Tim Clark
- Illustration/Graphics - Jaye Oliver

Recorded at Froggy Acres Studios, Fort Miller, NY. Thunderstorm recorded by David Shinn.

== The Fantastic Voyages of Captain Jack Flanders ==
Jack, Mojo and Claudine sail around the Tropics encountering mysterious and other-worldly incidents.

- Orchids and Moonbeams (2005)
- The Ghost Islands (2006)
- Tropical Hot Dog Night (2007)
- The White Castle (2008)
