= Dreams of Sumatra =

ZBS Foundation radio drama story

- Genre: Comedy drama
- Running time: 1 hour 59 minutes
- Country of origin: United States
- Language(s): English
- Starring: Robert Lorick
- Written by: Thomas Lopez
- Directed by: Thomas Lopez
- Recording studio: United States
- Original release: 1993
- Website: http://www.zbs.org/

Jack Flanders chronology
Dreams of Bali (1992)	Dreams of Sumatra (1993)	The Mystery of Jaguar Reef (1996)

Dreams of Sumatra is a radio drama, produced by the ZBS Foundation. It is the ninth of the Jack Flanders adventure series and the fourth (and last) of the Travels with Jack sub-series. It combines elements of American culture, Old-time radio and Sufism.

== Plot ==
Jack is approached by Louise Nettles, whose daughter, Jesse, has vanished whilst doing anthropological research in Sumatra. An exotic and unusual country where Islam has been integrated happily into a matriarchal society. Indranee, Jesse's teacher, helps Jack to investigate the Kabut, a secret society practicing ancient tribal magic. She also calls in another expert in tribal magic - a certain piano player called Mojo Sam. Together they must dodge the Bukittinggi Vortex, end of Ramadan fireworks and, most importantly, two factions of a dangerous organization engaged in an internal power-struggle, neither of which wants outside interference.

== Notes & Themes ==
This story states that Jack publishes his adventures - Carlos Castaneda style - and thus is known to the world at large.

Valeria Vasilevski has voiced multiple roles for ZBS, including the Maharini in Ruby 3, The Galactic Gumshoe, Part One: The Underworld, and one of the Android Sisters in various Ruby Galactic Gumshoe stories. The IMDb entry for Valeria Vasilevski credits her as the voice of one of the Android Sisters in a 1985 animated film by Bill Plympton called Boomtown.

== Quotes ==
Jack: "I have looked into the gaping mouth of that Vortex and there is no way in hell I'm going in there. Period. Savvy?"

== Credits ==
- Jack Flanders - Robert Lorick
- Louise Nettles - Valeria Vasilevski
- Indranee DeSilva - Yolande Bavan
- Mojo Sam - Dave Adams
- Wu Ling - Menica Jayatilake
- Jesse Nettles - Christina Denziger
- Henry - Baju
- Storyteller - Sarah Braveman
- Executive Producer - Thomas Manuel Lopez
- Story & Script - Meatball Fulton
- Music - Tim Clark
- Engineers - Robert Harari, Fulton & Clark
- Graphics - Jaye Oliver
- Environments and music recorded in Sumatra by Meatball Fulton

"Production was made possible through grants from the National Endowment for the Arts. Additional support provided by Garuda Indonesia Airlines, Garuda Orient Holidays, the Indonesian Tourist Office for North America and Aerowisata Hotels."

== Travels with Jack ==
All of the installments in this sub-series are entitled Dreams of ... although there are two others with a similar title - Dreams of Rio and Dreams of the Blue Morpho - which are not part of it.

Each story involves Jack being approached by a beautiful woman who asks for his help. In three of them he is sitting in a restaurant, eating alone, when this happens. The fourth (Dreams of Bali), while it begins with a strange dream concerning food, starts after Jack has already accepted the invitation and been flown out.

These are the only stories that Jack asks for his expenses be paid for.

- Dreams of the Amazon (1992)
- Dreams of India (1992)
- Dreams of Bali (1992)
- Dreams of Sumatra (1993)
