= Dave Herman (DJ) =

American disk jockey (1936–2014)

Dave Herman (1936 – May 28, 2014) was an American disc jockey, popular in the New York metropolitan area from 1972 to 1998. Herman was born in Huntington, New York and was the son of an Orthodox rabbi.

Herman began his career at 1410 WHTG in Asbury Park, New Jersey, and then moved to Philadelphia to become WMMR's first rock DJ. His show, dubbed 'The Marconi Experiment', debuted on April 29, 1968. The first song played on the show was "Flying" by The Beatles over the intro of which Herman recited these words: "Arise my heart, and fill your voice with music. For he who shares not dawn with his song, is one of the sons of ever darkness". He then moved to 95.5 WABC-FM in New York, which would later become WPLJ.

In 1970, Herman was the emcee for a live recording of Elton John in the A&R Studios in New York City. The recording was later released as the album "11-17-70".

Most notably, he later became the morning drive time host on WNEW-FM, where he was on the air from 1972 to 1982, 1986 to 1991 and then again from 1996 until the station ended its rock format in 1998. He was one of the station's best-known voices. Herman was also heard on New York classic rock station 92.3 WXRK (now WINS-FM). He was included on the Rock and Roll Hall of Fame's list of notable disc jockeys. During the early to mid 1990's, he worked for the same station as Howard Stern in New York, and would sporadically call into Howard's show.

Herman also played the Narrator for several ZBS Foundation radio dramas, starting with The Fourth Tower of Inverness in 1972, and continuing through Moon Over Morocco (1973), The Ah-Ha Phenomenon (1977), The Incredible Adventures of Jack Flanders (1978), Ruby the Galactic Gumshoe (1982), Ruby 2 (1985) Dreams of Rio (1987), The Mystery of Jaguar Reef (1996), and Ruby 8: The Good King Kapoor (2009).

In October, 2013, Herman was arrested by federal authorities at the airport in Saint Croix, U.S. Virgin Islands, after going there from his vacation home in the area. The criminal complaint stated he expected to meet a woman and her six-year-old daughter, who he allegedly believed was being brought for a sexual encounter with him. The 36-year-old woman who was "willing to let him have sex with her daughter 'Lexi'" at his St. Croix home was actually a Homeland Security agent who'd been "chatting him up online since November. ... 'I find girls that age incredibly sexy, soft, and their innocence is also a huge turn-on for me,' investigators said the 77-year-old Airmont, Rockland County, resident unwittingly told investigators who set up the sting. 'Age 6 is the perfect time to start her being loved that way.' ... [Herman] also promised not to hurt [the girl], though he admitted he might have to be 'forceful,' investigators said." After Herman also allegedly "bought a pair of plane tickets for the mother and daughter" he was charged with transportation with intent to engage in criminal sexual activity. His attorney, Mark Agnifilo, claimed Herman was sexually interested in the mother, not the girl, it was reported after Herman's death.

Herman died of an aneurysm on May 28, 2014, in the Essex County Jail in Newark, New Jersey, while awaiting trial. He was 78.
