= Laura Esterman =

American actress

- Occupation: Actress
- Years active: 1969–present
- Awards: Drama Desk Award for Outstanding Actress in a Play (1992); Obie Award for Distinguished Performance by an Actress (1992)

Laura Esterman is an American actress, known for portraying Ruby the Galactic Gumshoe in contemporary radio dramas, and for her Drama Desk Award and Obie Award winning performance in the 1992 original stage production of Scott McPherson's Marvin's Room.

== Early life ==
Esterman is the daughter of Dr. Benjamin Esterman and Sophie Milgram Esterman. Esterman studied acting at HB Studio.

== Career ==
Esterman made her Broadway debut in the 1969 revival of The Time of Your Life. Her other Broadway credits include The Waltz of the Toreadors, God's Favorite, Teibele and Her Demon, The Suicide, Metamorphosis and The Show-Off.

In 1972, Esterman played the Madonna Vampyra in the ZBS Foundation radio play The Fourth Tower of Inverness, the first in the long-running Jack Flanders series. Esterman returned to ZBS in 1982 to star as the title character in the first Ruby the Galactic Gumshoe serial, and has reprised the role many times in the decades to come, most recently Ruby 15: Creatures of the Light in 2025. Many of her Ruby appearances are credited to a stage name, "Blanche Blackwell". Esterman also returned as the Madonna Vampyra in the 2000 sequel, Return to Inverness.

Esterman has also worked in television and film. Her television credits include Remington Steele, St. Elsewhere, The Facts of Life, L.A. Law, Family Ties, Law & Order, Third Watch and Law & Order: Special Victims Unit among others. Her movie credits include Alone in the Dark, Ironweed, Awakenings, The Doors, Addams Family Values, The Confession and Arranged among others.

== Filmography ==
=== Film ===
Year	Title	Role	Notes
1982	Alone in the Dark	Woman Voyager	
1987	Ironweed	Nora	
1988	Me and Him	Bag Lady	
1990	Awakenings	Lolly	
1991	The Doors	New York Journalist	
1993	Addams Family Values	Cousin Ophelia	
1999	The Confession	Sarah's Cousin	
2000	Chinese Coffee	Actor in play / Messenger	
2001	Suspended Animation	Vanessa Boulette	
2004	From Other Worlds	Psychiatrist	
2007	Arranged	Judit	
2011	The Green	Mrs. Heller	
2017	Can Hitler Happen Here?	Miriam Kohen	
2018	Human Affairs	Journalist	

=== Television ===
Year	Title	Role	Notes
1970	NET Playhouse	Mary Magdalene	Episode: "Generation of Leaves: Jesus - A Passion Play for Americans"
1980	Another World	Felice Carpenter	Episode #1.4124
1984	Remington Steele	Miss Conover	Episode: "A Pocketful of Steele"
1985	St. Elsewhere	Psychiatrist	Episode: "Cheers"
1985	The Facts of Life	Ms. Resnick	Episode: "Into the Frying Pan"
1985	Children of the Night	Arlene	Television film
1987	L.A. Law	Gloria Rheinhold	Episode: "Fifty Ways to Floss Your Lover"
1987	Family Ties	Waitress	Episode: "Matchmaker"
1995, 1999	Law & Order	Evelyn Walcoff / Florence Cooley	2 episodes
2000	Third Watch	Marge	Episode: "Alone in a Crowd"
2000	Law & Order: SVU	Mrs. Sandomir	Episode: "Noncompliance"
2009	Life on Mars	Sue Moyer	Episode: "Home Is Where You Hang Your Holster"
2009	Law & Order: Criminal Intent	Elderly Landlady	Episode: "Identity Crisis"
2011	Mildred Pierce	Mrs. Kramer	3 episodes
2020	I Know This Much Is True	Ruth Rood	3 episodes
2021	The Blacklist	Ada Rosenberg	Episode: "The Avenging Angel (No. 49)"
