= Moon Over Morocco =

Moon Over Morocco may refer to:

- Moon Over Morocco (radio series), a 1974 radio drama
- Moon Over Morocco (film), a 1931 French mystery film
