= Jack Flanders =

Jack Flanders, full name Jonathan L. Flanders, is the protagonist of a series of audio dramas produced by the ZBS Foundation. He is the creation of writer and sound artist Thomas Lopez and is played by actor Robert Lorick.

Jack is an adventurer who travels the Earth, exploring both familiar physical places and a metaphysical land called the Invisible Realms. His character adapts as the story requires, ranging from a bumbling fool to a competent and professional detective into spiritual mysteries. Well-versed in the occult, folklore, primitive magic and various mystic phenomena, he is able to withstand most reality-altering experiences and generally has an open mind towards all things.

== Appearance and character ==
Being a character of audio drama, his physical appearance is not entirely clear, but he is depicted with blond hair in the CD cover art and is now in his late 60s or early 70s, having attended college in the late '60s. In Tropical Hot Dog Night (2007), his friend Claudine describes him as "six-foot-two with blond hair." In Somewhere Next Door to Reality, a shop assistant says that he resembles the French poet Jacques Prévert. As the nephew of those adventurers from a past age, Lord and Lady Jowls, Jack is somewhat of a man out of time, dressing in a white suit and Panama hat. On at least two occasions he's obliged to wear a pith helmet and other adventurer's garb. On another, he promises to wear an ascot tie, which he presumably had with him.

He attended the University of California, Berkeley in the late '60s, although it is not known what he studied. He loves coffee and likes to sample the local brews during his adventures. He frequently drinks beer but seldom wine or spirits (he does drink port in one episode of The Fourth Tower of Inverness and rum in The Mystery of Jaguar Reef). He may have smoked during his student days ("not since I read the Surgeon General's report," he says in The Fourth Tower of Inverness), and in Moon Over Morocco is able to provide a cigarette to a Moroccan, possibly implying that he smoked then, but now he has some difficulty tolerating the presence of people who smoke. On one occasion, at least, while living in London prior to the first adventure (The Fourth Tower of Inverness), he swallowed hashish ("purely by accident") and saw a unicorn as a result. In Moon Over Morocco, he says that he meditates and never uses any drugs. He doesn't exercise. For a "few years", he says in Return to Inverness, he was a vegetarian but gave it up. "You have to have the right body type to be a good vegetarian," rejoins chef Wham-Bam Shazam.

His business card reads "What appears to be coming at you is coming from you." He first heard this motto in Brazil during the Dreams of Rio story. As to why he chose this for his business card, he explains in Dreams of Sumatra, "I heard it. I liked it. I had it printed."

== Romance ==
He is clearly very attractive to women, and his adventures usually include some romance. Beyond a rare kiss, no physical contact with any woman is ever depicted, and romantic feelings are implied rather than stated. Usually, the women seem to be more interested in him than he is in them. In Dreams of India, he pursues a woman, Kamala Shukla, without success. Besides Madonna Vampyra, who appears in The Fourth Tower of Inverness and Return to Inverness, Claudine (a woman from another plane of existence who first appears in Somewhere Next Door to Reality) is his only love interest of his who appears in more than one adventure story.

In Midnight at the Casa Luna, two of the characters refer to Jack's relationship with an Ifrit, Layla Oolupi, which ended badly. Layla appears to Jack during Moon Over Morocco and plays a small but helpful role in his journey. However, in Do That in Real Life? Jack says that he first encountered Layla at Woodhenge, an event alluded to in Moon Over Morocco as occurring in a dream/vision of their past shared life. Lady Jowls suggests in The Fourth Tower of Inverness that many of the characters in the series have known each other in past incarnations and are destined to move through time together. Whenever the relationship with the Ifrit does occur, it is between stories and we only ever hear references to it. There is a malevolent Oolupi in The Fourth Tower of Inverness who almost succeeds in seducing Jack. When she fails, she tries to drown him in a lake of her tears.

== Finances ==
Jack's finances are something of a mystery. When he is introduced, he does not appear to have wealth, but he is able to travel around the world well enough. He lives principally in an apartment in New York and later inherits the mansion and estate of Inverness, so a good deal of family money can be assumed. In Dreams of Sumatra it is mentioned that his previous adventures have been published - Carlos Castaneda style.

== Jack Flanders stories ==
- The Fourth Tower of Inverness (1972)
- Moon Over Morocco (1973)
- The Ah-Ha Phenomenon (Originally presented within the science fiction series Stars & Stuff, 1977)
- The Incredible Adventures of Jack Flanders (1978)
- Dreams of Rio (1987)
- Travels with Jack
  - Dreams of the Amazon (1992)
  - Dreams of India (1992)
  - Dreams of Bali (1992)
  - Dreams of Sumatra (1993)
- The Mystery of Jaguar Reef (1996)
- Midnight at the Casa Luna (1998, 2000)
- Return to Inverness (2000)
- Travelling Jack
  - Dreams of the Blue Morpho (2002)
  - Somewhere Next Door to Reality (2002)
  - Do That in Real Life? (2003)
  - The Eye of Van Gogh (2003)
- The Fantastic Voyages of Captain Jack Flanders'
  - Orchids and Moonbeams (2005)
  - The Ghost Islands (2006)
  - Tropical Hot Dog Night (2007)
  - The White Castle (2008)
- Steam Dreamers of Inverness
  - Steam Dreamers of Inverness - Part 1 (2010)
  - Steam Dreamers of Inverness - Part 2 - Islands in the Sky (2010)
  - Steam Dreamers of Inverness - Part 3 (2011)
  - Steam Dreamers of Inverness - Part 4 (2011)
- Do Angels Really Have Wings? (2012)
- Dreams of Tiffany Blue (2013)
- The Secret of the Crystal Maidens (2014)
- The Green Velvet Chair (2015)
- League of the Green Velvet Chairs (2016)
- Madonna in a Green Velvet Chair (2018)
- Associated (have secondary characters in common)
  - The Adventures of Rocket Pierre, a sub-series within Stars and Stuff (1977) [Little Frieda]
  - Land of Enchantment (1997) [Mojo Sam]
  - Little Frieda's Life Lessons (2001) [Little Frieda]
  - The Wee Weever - A Little Frieda Mystery (2004) [Mojo Sam, Little Frieda]
  - The Case of the Disappearing Witch (2005) [Mojo Sam, Little Frieda]
  - Mojo's Vest Pocket Voodoo Adventures (2009) [Mojo Sam]

== Broadcast history ==
The early stories were broadcast on college radio stations and on NPR during the 1970s and 1980s. Currently, they are sold directly on CD and as mp3 downloads via the ZBS Foundation website.

Jack Flanders story episodes are regularly featured on Mike Watt's The Watt from Pedro Show podcast.

== Characters ==
The following characters have prominent or recurring roles in the Jack Flanders series.

- Jack Flanders, the hero of the stories, is an adventurer into the Invisible Realms and investigator of strange and mysterious events. People with unusual problems seek his very special type of metaphysical help.
- Little Frieda, a Venusian who is a million and a half years old, looks like a little human girl with large pigtails and no pupils in her eyes. She smokes large Havana cigars, and can see thought forms. When in danger, her pigtails stand on end. She appears in Moon Over Morocco as "Little Flossic, the child of magick", the words "Flossic" and "Magick" accented on the second syllable. In this adventure Jack addresses her as "Flossi". Little Frieda is played by P. J. Orte (though credited as Spooner Duffy in Moon Over Morocco), who also hosts the science fiction series Stars and Stuff, produced by ZBS ("Hi, I'm P. J. Orte, back again with science fiction fantasy stories, some long, some short.")
- Mojo Sam the Yoodoo Man, an expatriate American, Mojo Sam discovered his roots in Morocco where he studied a mixture of yoga and voodoo. He is a native of Philadelphia and later returned to the US and accompanied Jack Flanders on many adventures.
- Kasbah Kelly, an American expatriate who owns a bar in Tangier. Although Mojo Sam is a professional pianist and travels around the world working in cafes, bars, and clubs, Kelly is one of only two employers we meet. Kelly arranges Jack's trip to Africa and is his guide to Morocco. He narrates Moon Over Morocco (the only Jack Flanders adventure narrated by a character within the story). Although he is a principal character in this adventure and is alluded to in later adventures, he never recurs. Kelly is fond of adages and gets into a bit of a contest with Mojo, the two of them quipping increasingly esoteric sayings back and forth. At the beginning of Moon Over Morocco Kelly warns us that not all of what he is going to tell us will necessarily be true.
- Dr. Marlin Mazoola, an alchemist of the first order, Dr. Mazoola is a classic mad scientist whose quest for alchemical knowledge often brings about great danger.
- The Madonna Vampyra, an "energy vampire", but also the queen of the "Lotus Land", which can be accessed through The Fourth Tower of Inverness. She is the first of the serious love interests for Jack Flanders. She appears in the original Inverness serial, as well as Return to Inverness, in which it is revealed that she has hardly aged over the intervening years, whereas Jack, a mortal, has. She is played by Laura Esterman, who plays a number of characters throughout the Flanders series and Ruby the Galactic Gumshoe, in the serial of that name, also released by ZBS Media.
- Old Far-Seeing Art, an expert in the technique of sending one's consciousness out into the body of animals and viewing the world through their eyes. He was once a miner ("in the days of ore") and considers himself a cowboy - especially when Chief Wampum is around.
- Chief Wampum, originally from India. He moved to Inverness in reaction to all the people who were coming to India to study with gurus and take an Indian name, he decided to come to the west and take a western name: Chief Wampum Stompum. He's known to have authored a book on how to fly "fromborks" and also helps Jack to access the plane where the fabled city of the Ah-Ha's dwells.
