= The Fourth Tower of Inverness =

ZBS Foundation radio drama series

- Genre: Comedy drama
- Running time: 7 hours 12 minutes
- Country of origin: United States
- Language(s): English
- Starring: Robert Lorick
- Written by: Meatball Fulton
- Directed by: Meatball Fulton
- Recording studio: United States
- Original release: 1972
- Website: http://www.zbs.org/

Jack Flanders chronology
| The Fourth Tower of Inverness (1972) | Moon Over Morocco (1974) |

The Fourth Tower of Inverness is a 1972 radio drama, produced by the ZBS Foundation. It is the first of the Jack Flanders adventure series, and combines elements of American culture and Old-time radio, with metaphysical concepts such as past life regression, Sufi wisdom, Tibetan Buddhism and shamanistic communication with the natural world.

The adventure takes place in an estate called Inverness, and the action focuses upon a mysterious and (at first) illusory extra tower of the mansion, which many visitors have attempted to reach, ultimately vanishing in the process. The program was originally broadcast in 7-minute-long episodes; collectively, these run a total of seven and half hours.

== History ==
The Fourth Tower of Inverness was written and directed by Meatball Fulton. The initial story concept was created while he was staying at a farmhouse outside of Montreal, Quebec, Canada. The farm was called Inverness, and was named and designed after a house the original owner had owned in Inverness, Scotland. It had been abandoned for ten years, but was being looked after by an old caretaker. The initial characters were written for other guests at the farmhouse, who were friends and acquaintances of Meatball Fulton, although the series was not produced at this time.

In June 1970, Meatball Fulton moved to Fort Edward, New York to help found ZBS Media, with a focus on producing commercials for various musical acts such as Billy Joel, Little Feat, Jefferson Airplane and Captain Beefheart. After about a year and a half of this, he became bored with writing commercials, and had an uncomfortable experience producing an album for Abbie Hoffman. Remembering the radio play he had written back in Montreal, he decided to produce his own script. The story was fleshed out, actors were cast, and the episodes were produced periodically whenever new scripts were written. Some of the featured actors cast were Robert Lorick in the lead role, Murray Head, and Dave Herman as narrator. The relaxed nature of the production can still be heard, with occasional breaking of character by the cast, and laughing when lines are flubbed.

Eventually a backer was found, Augie Blume of Grunt Records, who helped shape the series down to 7-minute daily episodes, and half-hour weekend episodes. The Fourth Tower of Inverness played on 397 college radio stations between 1972 and 1973. A poster created by David Byrd helped promote the series. More than 10,000 posters were distributed in lots of 20-25 to participating radio stations. "The poster provided space, integrated into the 'Lotus Jukebox' (a key element in the plot and one of the focal points of the poster), which permitted stations to insert their call letters, frequency, and time of broadcast."

The series was a hit on college radio stations, and has since been broadcast in several different formats, such as on NPR Playhouse and The Watt from Pedro Show. It has also been available for purchase in many audio formats including record, cassette, CD, and MP3.

== Story ==
Jack Flanders, a hitchhiker and drifter, is invited to the estate of his aunt, Lady Sarah Jowls. As Jack approaches the estate, he sees an outline of the mansion silhouetted against the night sky, with four distinct towers reaching up to the sky, though his aunt and everyone else who lives there insists there are only three towers.

Jack slowly becomes familiar with the strange inhabitants of Inverness, including the mansion's caretaker, Old Far-seeing Art, who can listen to the aum sound emanating from the center of the Universe, and tends to the estate's hedge maze, a place that only he can enter without going insane. Others include Dr. Mazoola, an alchemist of the first order, Jives the Butler, who is an old quick-change artist with a dry sense of humor, the Madonna Vampyra, an energy vampire who lives in the mansion's hollow walls, Wham Bam Shazam, a young man with a penchant for the 1950s whom Chief Wampum is teaching to fly, and Little Frieda, a Venusian who is a "million and a half" years old, but looks like a small girl with no pupils in her eyes, large pigtails, and a penchant for smoking huge Havana cigars.

The group teaches Jack what he needs to know in order to successfully enter, and, more importantly, return from, the Fourth Tower, ranging from an explanation of the Tibetan Wheel of Life to a past-life regression and a lesson on how to draw energy from trees.

Lord Henry Jowls, the husband of Lady Jowls, vanished without a trace into the mysterious Fourth Tower some years ago. Lady Jowls is disturbed by the recent happenings at the mansion, in particular an old jukebox somewhere in one of the mansion's towers, that plays 1950s songs whenever an accident is about to occur. Accidents have been on the rise in Inverness recently, and range from simple misunderstandings involving an aroused kundalini to a fire-breathing dragon.

Jack realizes that the mysterious jukebox must be playing in the invisible Fourth Tower, and is determined to find its source. It is said that in the past, eight people have seen and entered the fourth tower of Inverness, and none have returned alive. Jack Flanders is the ninth.

== Credits ==
- Jack Flanders – Robert Lorick
- Little Frieda – P.J. Orte (Billed as Pat Anderson)
- Narrator and Dr. Mazoola – Dave Herman
- The Madonna Vampyra – Laura Esterman
- Chief Wampum and Old Far-Seeing Art – Meatball Fulton
- Lord Henry Jowls – Murray Head
- Meanie Eenie & Lady Sarah Jowls – Valerie Mamches
- Intro-Outro themes – Paul Combs
- Outro-Announcer – Mark Stone
- Voice in Whirlitzer – Ram Dass
- Engineering – Bobby Bielecki (Billed as Virgil Snakeskin)
- Written and directed - Meatball Fulton

The performer playing Jives the Butler was uncredited; he was the husband of Valerie Mamches, who played Meanie Eenie and Lady Jowls.

Special thanks to Robert Durand, The Jefferson Airplane, John Romkey, Michael Roach, Augie Blume, Max & Miles and all the gang at ZBS.

Dedicated to Rango, his vision made all this possible.

"The Fourth Tower of Inverness has been recorded on adhesive tape"

== Intro ==
Each episode of The Fourth Tower of Inverness begins:

High upon a mountain, above the pines and mist that surrounds the bay of Inverness, there stands an incredible mansion. Its three towers appear to pierce the sky, its windows are like a thousand eyes turned inward, and its doors, hinged on time, open into endless space. The Fourth Tower of Inverness!

== Jukeboxes ==
During his adventures, Jack Flanders encounters several jukeboxes, each with a different theme.

- Whirlitzer of Wisdom – This is the first jukebox discovered, and the only one outside of the Fourth Tower. For the price of a dime, it plays various wisdoms by people such as Ram Dass and Don Van Vliet (billed as the Venerable Van Vliet). Its name is based on the classic Wurlitzer jukebox.
- Great Green Jade Jukebox – This is the second jukebox discovered, inside the Fourth Tower. It is able to bring a city to life, replaying encounters in the order of the tracks on the jukebox, starting with track #1. In order to reach the next step, track 2 must be played, and so on.
- Bodhisattva Jukebox – This is the final jukebox discovered inside the Fourth Tower. It features the song "Kirtan" by Bhagavan Das, and listening to it brings understanding. The characters' heads and arms expand, in a way similar to a story of the bodhisattva canon.
- Lotus Jukebox – Source of the haunting music (1950s songs). Although this is what he is searching for in The Fourth Tower of Inverness, Jack Flanders does not find it until The Ah-Ha Phenomenon.

== Music ==
In the series there are many musical interludes:

- "Angel Baby" – Rosie and the Originals
- "Devil or Angel" – The Clovers
- "Most of All" – The Moonglows
- "Oh What a Night" – The Dells
- "Where Do You Come From" – Elvis Presley
- "The Golden Wedding" – Woody Herman and His Orchestra
- "(You're the) Devil in Disguise" – Elvis Presley
- "There Goes My Baby" – The Drifters
- "It's All in the Game" – Tommy Edwards
- "Yellow Brick Road" – Captain Beefheart and His Magic Band
- "Duke of Earl" – Gene Chandler
- "Green Eyes" – Helen O'Connell/Jimmy Dorsey and his Orchestra/Bob Eberly
- "Whole Lotta Shakin' Goin' On" – Jerry Lee Lewis
- "Jazzbo Stomp" – Memphis Jug Band
- "Hit the Road Jack" – Ray Charles
- "Sh-Boom" – The Chords
- "The Traveller" – Jade Warrior

== Influences ==
The idea of a jukebox that plays whenever an accident was about to occur was based on and paying homage to an episode of the radio show I Love a Mystery, which featured an organ playing in the basement whenever an accident would occur. The name of the lead character, Jack Flanders, was also in homage to the hero on I Love a Mystery, Jack Packard.

The past life regression sequence is taken from a real life experience, and shows the actual past life relationships between series author Meatball Fulton and actress Laura Esterman, who plays the Madonna Vampyra. The technique of regression was developed by William Swygard, adapted from the pamphlet Multi-Level Awareness and was available as a booklet by mail.

== Sequel ==
The Fourth Tower of Inverness is the beginning of the Jack Flanders series, and several of the characters introduced continue to appear in later adventures. Jack briefly returns to the mansion of Inverness in Moon Over Morocco (1973), and the quest for the Lotus Jukebox continues in The Ah-Ha Phenomenon (1977). A direct sequel was produced in 2000, Return to Inverness, which re-united most of the original cast. A related series "Steam Dreams of Inverness" was cut short when funds ran out.
