= Return to Inverness =

ZBS Foundation radio drama story

- Genre: Comedy drama
- Running time: 5 hours 54 minutes
- Country of origin: United States
- Language(s): English
- Starring: Robert Lorick
- Announcer: Kirby Airs
- Written by: Meatball Fulton
- Directed by: Meatball Fulton
- Recording studio: United States
- Original release: 2000
- Website: http://www.zbs.org/

Jack Flanders chronology
Midnight at the Casa Luna (1998 / 2000)	Return to Inverness (2000)	Dreams of the Blue Morpho (2002)

Return to Inverness is a 2000 radio drama, the twelfth in ZBS's Jack Flanders series. The serial was written and directed by Meatball Fulton, as a sequel to the 1972 story The Fourth Tower of Inverness, the first in the series.

== Plot ==
Lady Jowls, Jack's aunt, has left him her estate of Inverness in her will, on the condition that he allow all the house guests and other residents to live on the estate as long as they wish to remain. Jack must deal with not only the eccentric residents, but also a powerful invisible energy emanating from the ruined temple on the estate grounds which is causing the house and grounds to vibrate. To complicate matters, there is a trickster loose in the hollow walls, who removes objects and replaces them with something else; Jack loses the clothing he brought with him and Lady Pompon her favorite teapot, but they receive in return what appears to be Lord Jowls' clothing from the 1920s and a foot locker full of fake feet. Jack calls upon Mojo Sam the Youdou man to help stop the mysterious force from shaking Inverness apart, while he helps Little Frieda complete her nearly 30-year-long mission to collect all of Saint Sey's bones from within the only occasionally visible Fourth Tower.

== Description and characters ==
This series does include some of the Sufi proverbs and lore which appear in previous Jack Flanders series, and also much of the humor.

There are some characters from previous adventures, aside from Jack: Madonna Vampyra, Old Far Seeing Art and Wham Bam Shazam, back from a stint at the Cordon Bleu cooking school in Paris; Chief Wampum and Doctor Mazoola play important roles behind the scenes.

Characters new to this series include Madame Trunknose, who talks to crows, Lady Pompon and her niece Evie, who are working on Lady Pompon's memoirs, the Mask Maker who carves masks and hollows out a giant mushroom to create a cottage, and an operatic diva, Madama Maltzo Paltzo, who discovers that the spaces within the walls form a marvelous concert chamber.

== Credits ==
- Jack Flanders: Robert Lorick
- Narrator and Dr. Mazoola: Kirby Airs
- Lady Pompon: Sarah Braveman
- Little Frieda: P.J. Orte
- Evie, Poodles: Eva Dolan
- Madama Maltzo Paltzo: Ida Faiella
- Old Far Seeing Art, Chief Wampum: Meatball Fulton
- Wham Bam Shazam, the Wairogi: John Romeo
- Madame Trunknose: Laura Roth
- Madonna Vampyra: Laura Esterman (as Blanche Blackwell)
- Mojo Sam: Dave Adams
- Proverbs, St. Sey: Shelley Williams
- The Mask Man: Jim Post
- Bigelow: Art Fairbain
- Bimboshatha: Pascale Poirier
- Samantha James: Jamie Sams
- Rufus: Rufus
- Script: Meatball Fulton
- Director: Tom Lopez
- Music: Tim Clark

Recorded at Froggy Acres, Ft. Edward, NY and Backpocket Studios, New York City.

== Quotes ==
Old Far-Seeing Art: "I guess I wasn't invisible."
Jack: "No. Not that I could see."
