= Bhagavan Das (yogi) =

American yogi

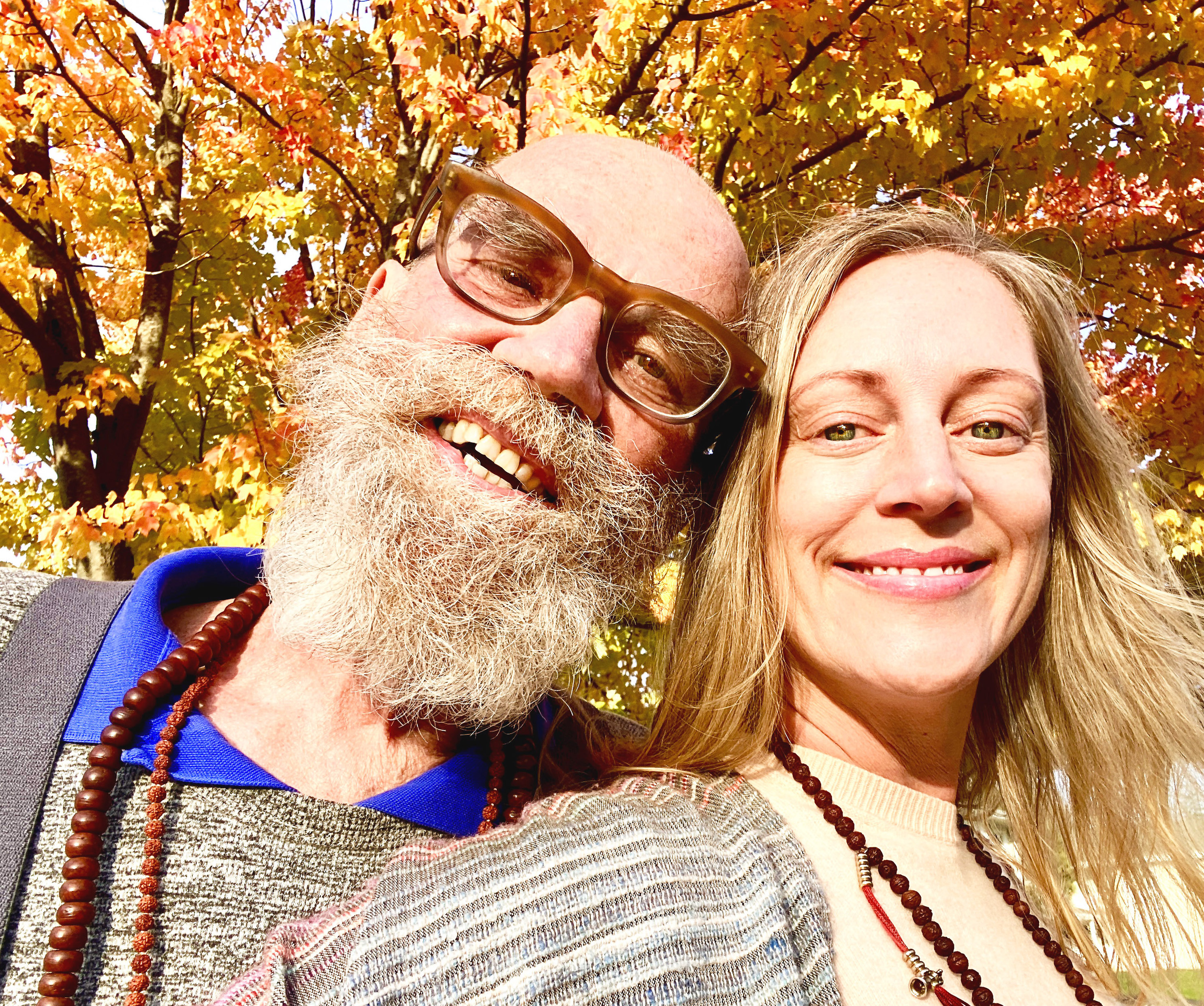
- Bhagavan Das with Amulya Maa in 2020
- Born: Kermit Michael Riggs; Laguna Beach, California
- Occupations: Spiritual teacher, singer, writer
- Spouses: Bhavani (m. 1972; d. 1983); Sharada Devi; Amulya Maa (m. 2020)
- Children: 3
- Website: bhagavandas.com

Bhagavan Das (Devanagari: भगवान दास) (born Kermit Michael Riggs) is an American yogi who lived for six years in India, Nepal, and Sri Lanka. He is a bhakti yogi, kirtan singer, spiritual teacher and writer.

== History ==
In 1963, Kermit Riggs was 18 years old and living in Laguna Beach as photographer, musician, and surfer. There, he became disillusioned with American imperialism and the American lifestyle. This sentiment increased after John F. Kennedy's assassination, which led him to feel embarrassed about being an American. Partially in response to these feelings, he planned a solo trip through Europe, Northern Africa and the Middle East and Asia.

He traveled to Greece in December 1963 before beginning his journey as a wandering ascetic in India, Nepal and Sri Lanka. He writes that he received numerous initiations and teachings from various saints and sages. In India he lived and learned about many Indian lifestyles, dialects, music, songs, and traditions, and met many swamis and saints. He became Bhagavan Das and a devotee of goddess Kali.

In 1965, Riggs was living with a Swami and practicing Sādhanā. After six months in this arrangement, he went on a Pilgrimage with his Swami to meet the Hindu holy man Neem Karoli Baba, whom he subsequently became a devotee of. He developed a pattern of alternately studying with Baba and living as an ascetic for a few months at a time.

In 1967, Das was living with two women in his off-ashram time and heard that two Americans were giving LSD to people in the restaurant Blue Tibetan. He sent Richard Alpert to retrieve a dose. Alpert stayed with the Americans for five days at the Sewati hotel where they were hosting a seminar. Richard Alpert decided to follow Bhagavan Das instead of traveling to Japan with David Padwa. After three months guiding Alpert, Das decided that Alpert should meet his guru Neem Karoli Baba. Baba became Alpert's guru and gave him the name Ram Dass.

In 1971 Bhagavan Das returned to America. In 1997 he wrote his autobiography, It's Here Now (Are You?). In 2002, he released his seventh full album, called Now, that was produced and arranged by Mike D of the Beastie Boys, an East-meets-West musical pairing. Bhagavan Das appeared in Ram Dass' 1971 book Be Here Now, which described Bhagavan Das' role in Ram Dass' spiritual journeys in India.

== Personal life ==
In 1972 in California Bhagavan Das married his girlfriend, Bhavani, who was expecting their child; subsequently their daughter, Soma, was born in New York. In 1974 in Berkeley, California, while still married to Bhavani, (Note: Bhagavan Das (1997): "[I] wasn't divorced from Bhavani, and yet I already had 'wife' number two.") he met Usha. Bhagavan Das and Usha had a son, Mikyo, and a daughter, Lalita. Bhagavan Das' marriage to Bhavani ended with her death in 1983. He and Usha separated c. 1984.

Bhagavan Das was married to Sharada Devi for 12 years.

In early 2019, Bhagavan Das and his current wife Amulya Maa began singing and teaching together. On October 1, 2020, they were married.

== Works ==
=== Autobiography ===
- It's Here Now (Are You?): A Spiritual Memoir. Broadway Books. 1997. ISBN 0-7679-0009-X.

=== Radio plays ===
- The Fourth Tower of Inverness, 1972, Bhagavan Das's singing is the voice of the Bodhisattva Jukebox.
- Moon Over Morocco, 1974, Bhagavan Das's singing is used in Sunny Skies' dream sequence.

=== Selected discography ===
- AH, 1972
- Now (produced by Mike D of the Beastie Boys), 2002
- Holy Ghost Sessions (with Richard Sales), 2004
- Golden Voice, 2007
- Love Songs to the Dark Lord, 2009
- The Howler at Dawn, 2009
- Mother Light, 2014

=== Selected video appearances (self) ===
- What is Yoga? (with David Life, Sharon Ganon, and Willem Dafoe), 1998
- Ram Dass, Fierce Grace, 2001
- Crazy Sexy Cancer, 2007
- Spiritual Revolution, 2008
- One Giant Leap 2: What About Me?, 2008
- Karmageddon, 2011
- Kumaré, 2011
