= The Cabinet of Dr. Fritz =

NPR radio drama

- Genre: Radio horror anthology
- Running time: 30 minutes
- Country of origin: USA
- Language: English
- Syndicates: NPR
- Created by: Thomas Lopez
- Written by: Thomas Lopez
- Directed by: Bill Raymond
- Original release: October 3 – December 26, 1984
- No. of episodes: 13

The Cabinet of Dr. Fritz was a 1984 binaural radio drama series produced by Thomas Lopez and the ZBS Foundation for NPR. At the beginning of each show, it was suggested that listeners wear headphones.

== Production ==
“Fritz” was the nickname Lopez gave to the human head-shaped microphone he and his team used to record their three-dimensional productions, but its official name was the Neumann Ku81 Dummy Head. A solid rubber head with microphones set inside the ear chambers, it was designed to record sounds the way a human being would hear them.

While the ZBS Foundation had been working with 3D sound since its founding in 1970, The Cabinet of Dr. Fritz series grew out of ZBS’ adaptation of Sticks, a Karl Edward Wagner short horror story set inside an abandoned house. Lopez recorded the drama on location, with actors performing for the dummy head microphone in an actual abandoned house across the Hudson River from where he lived. The binaural sound was such a great fit for the horror genre that Lopez set out to create an entire series of creepy stories recorded in 3D sound.

The series was produced with funds provided by the New York State Council on the Arts, the National Endowment for the Arts and the Corporation for Public Broadcasting through National Public Radio Satellite Program Development Fund.

== Reception ==
Reviews were generally favorable. In Stereophile, Thomas J. Norton wrote of Sticks:

Clearly demonstrates the dramatic possibilities of the binaural art... It's a striking recording... The sense of depth and space is startling; the ambient feel of the environment combined with the sense of movement and positioning of the dialog and highly effective sound effect makes for a memorable experience... Listen in a darkened room for maximum impact.

John Sunier's review in Audio:

The Mist, when heard in the proper setting (at night, in the dark) with good stereo headphones, can be much more scary than a motion picture of a Stephen King story. It ran over three of the programs in the series, for a total of 90 minutes-the same as a feature film, interestingly enough. The other excellent use of binaural in the radio drama series was the story Aura, by Latin American author Carlos Fuentes.

== Episodes ==
Below is a complete list of the show's 13-episode run.

Episodes
#	Title	Notes	Airdate
1	The Mist - Part 1	Adaptation of Stephen King’s novella about a small town that is suddenly enveloped in an unnatural mist concealing otherworldly monsters. Dramatized by Thomas Lopez (as M. Fulton) and directed by Bill Raymond. Additional credits include music by Tim Clark, location recording engineered by Bob Bielecki and special thanks to Dennis Etchison, who adapted The Mist into a feature-length screenplay for Dino DeLaurentiis in the early 1980s. That unproduced script was used as a jumping off point for Thomas Lopez’s radio adaptation. While the story was split into three separate parts for radio, it was released as one long drama on cassette and double LP by ZBS in 1984 and again by Simon & Schuster Audio on cassette in 1986 and later on CD.	October 2, 1984
2	The Mist - Part 2	A gruesome invasion of grotesque, giant insects comes when the mist settles in the continuation of Stephen King's story, dramatized by Thomas Lopez	October 9, 1984
3	The Mist - Part 3	The desperate townspeople demand a human sacrifice to the mist and a young father tries to engineer an escape in the conclusion of Stephen King's story, dramatized by Thomas Lopez	October 16, 1984
4	Aura - Part 1	Adaptation of Carlos Fuentes’ short novel, dramatized by Thomas Lopez (as M. Fulton). Upon answering a classified ad tailored to his talents, Felipe Montero meets a 100-year-old woman who appears to have complete control over her young niece. Recipient of the Corporation for Public Broadcasting award for Best Radio Drama	October 23, 1984
5	Aura - Part 2	Felipe Montero realizes that he is no longer in control of his life and slowly discovers that the path he follows began before his birth and extends far beyond his death in the conclusion of Carlos Fuentes’ haunting short novel, dramatized by Thomas Lopez	October 30, 1984
6	The Bleeding Man & Saturday Night at the White Woman Watching Hole	A pair of strange tales from Cherokee Indian fantasist Craig Strete, dramatized and directed by Thomas Lopez. Starring Rino Thunder with music composed and performed by Tim Clark. The Bleeding Man tells the story of a young Native American who from birth has been bleeding from his chest. The government keeps him locked in a cell. Refusing to heed his uncle's warnings, the authorities ignorance leads to a devastating climax. In Saturday Night at the White Woman Watching Hole, two Native American men out on the town get more than they bargained for when they follow a beautiful and fascinating blond woman and their lust soon turns to terror.	November 6, 1984
7	Sticks	An abandoned farmhouse, built upon an ancient stone foundation, is surrounded by sculptures of twisted sticks in the forms of bizarre crucifixes. A stone burial chamber and evidence of human sacrifice indicate that a prehistoric cult once lived there ... and it soon becomes clear that they still do. Adaptation of Karl Edward Wagner's short story, dramatized by Thomas Lopez and directed by Bill Raymond.	November 13, 1984
8	Mumbo Jumbo - Part 1	Jazz, voodoo, the Cotton Club, flappers, gangsters and bootleggers intermingle in this lively adaptation of Ishmael Reed’s novel. Recorded on location in Philadelphia, Lopez and company captured the sounds of the era by riding in the backseat of old cars and recording out on the late night streets of Philly with a cast of over thirty actors. Starring Dave Adams as the voodoo detective, Papa LaBas.	November 20, 1984
9	Mumbo Jumbo - Part 2	Continuation of Ishmael Reed’s novel, dramatized and directed by Thomas Lopez	November 27, 1984
10	Mumbo Jumbo - Part 3	The Knights Templar threaten the Wallflower Order, which retaliates by kidnapping Hinkle Von Hampton, one of the rival group's members in the continuation of Ishmael Reed’s novel, dramatized and directed by Thomas Lopez	December 4, 1984
11	Mumbo Jumbo - Part 4	Continuation of Ishmael Reed’s novel, dramatized and directed by Thomas Lopez	December 11, 1984
12	Mumbo Jumbo - Part 5	A startling discovery unravels the plot's tangled web, revealing a mysterious conspiracy that began in Egypt thousands of years ago in the continuation of Ishmael Reed’s novel, dramatized and directed by Thomas Lopez	December 18, 1984
13	Mumbo Jumbo - Part 6	Conclusion of Ishmael Reed’s novel, dramatized and directed by Thomas Lopez	December 25, 1984
