= Dreams of the Blue Morpho =

ZBS Foundation radio drama story

- Genre: Comedy drama
- Country of origin: United States
- Language(s): English
- Starring: Robert Lorick
- Written by: Thomas Lopez
- Directed by: Thomas Lopez
- Recording studio: United States
- Original release: 2002
- Website: http://www.zbs.org/

Jack Flanders chronology
Return to Inverness (2000)	Dreams of the Blue Morpho (2002)	Somewhere Next Door to Reality (2002)

Dreams of the Blue Morpho is a radio drama, produced by the ZBS Foundation. It is the thirteenth of the Jack Flanders adventure series and the first of the Travelling Jack sub-series. It combines elements of Old-time radio with psychic phenomena, supernatural beings and energies.

== Plot ==
Mojo is playing piano at Senior Frog's in Costa Rica. He needs Jack to help him out with a problem his new friend Amy has been having all her life but which seems to be getting worse. A sinister light hovers close to her from time to time and it doesn't seem to like her boyfriends. In order to lure it out, Jack suggests that he and Amy pretend to be involved and before he knows it he's up to his neck in Candomblé and the Orishas once again.

== Notes & Themes ==
This is one of several stories involving Candomblé and the Orishas, albeit in a fairly tangential way.

== Quotes ==
Jack: "Jane said to me, 'Jack you don't belong in the present. You should have been living in the 1920s or 1930s.' I guess I missed my time, born too late..."

== Credits ==
- Jack Flanders - Robert Lorick
- Mojo - Dave Adams
- Amy - Shelly Westonberg
- Nina - Ana Munoz
- Felix - Bill Blechingberg
- Narrator - Kirby Airs
- Producer/Director/Engineer - Tom Lopez
- Writer - Meatball Fulton
- Music - Tim Clark
- Illustration/Graphics - Jaye Oliver

Voices recorded at BackPocket Studios, NYC.
Post production/mixing at Froggy Acres, Fort Miller, New York

"Special thanks to John Romkey and to all the friends who helped fund this series. Also a hug and thanks to Jamie Sams."

== Travelling Jack ==
Every Travelling Jack adventure begins with a phone call from Mojo, asking for Jack's help. Usually the call wakes Jack up. During the call, Mojo drops more and more hints as to where in the world he is. None of the adventures involve the Invisible Realms, as such.

- Dreams of the Blue Morpho (2002)
- Somewhere Next Door to Reality (2002)
- Do That in Real Life? (2003)
- The Eye of Van Gogh (2003)
