= Ruby the Galactic Gumshoe =

Radio comedy adventure series by the ZBS Foundation

Ruby the Galactic Gumshoe is a science fiction radio drama series by the ZBS Foundation, written by Thomas Lopez. The first series, Ruby: Adventures of a Galactic Gumshoe, was created in 1982, and was broadcast on about 500 public radio stations. In each story, the title character Ruby is hired to solve a metaphysical problem. New series have been released every few years, reaching Ruby 15 in 2025. Ruby is played by actress Laura Esterman.

== Description ==
Ruby is a comic science fiction treatment of the hardboiled detective genre; the original series took place on the planet of Summa Nulla ("the high point of nothing") although later series took Ruby to other planets and solar systems.

Laura Esterman starred as Ruby in the first series and Karen Young starred in the second series as "Ruby Too", another version of the protagonist, while Esterman, as Ruby, had a cameo part in this series. Esterman returned to the lead role from Ruby 3 onwards, credited as Blanche Blackwell.

The series was originally syndicated to air on the radio in episodes of approximately three to four minutes long, but later released as half-hour episodes to radio stations. To date, thirteen Ruby adventures have been released, the most recent in 2019.

Ruby has been broadcast in 23 countries, including Canada (on CBC), England (on BBC), Australia (on ABC) and the US (originally on PBS, more recently on Sirius-XM Satellite Radio). Ruby entered Science Fiction's Audio Hall of Fame for Best Science Fiction of 1982.

== Series ==
=== Ruby: The Adventures of a Galactic Gumshoe (1982) ===
This story was the very first cyberpunk radio drama. In it, Ruby is hired by Rodant Kapoor to find out who is manipulating the media on Summa Nulla.

- Ruby: Laura Esterman
- T.J. Teru: Bill Raymond
- Angel Lips: Robin Karfo
- And/Or, Rodant Kapoor, and Mother Kapoor: Tom Stewart
- The Android Sisters: Ruth Breuer & Valeria Vasilevski
- Chief Moliere, the Tookah: Fred Neuman
- Onoffon and Moleena Mole: Honora Ferguson
- Offonoff: Valeria Vasilevski
- Monet: Count Stovall
- Moonbeam: Elaine Graham
- Toots Mutant: Cara Duff-McCormick
- Harold Matisse: Chris McCaan
- The Vocoder Chorus: Tim Clark
- The Announcer: Dave Herman
- Executive Producer & Director: Thomas Manuel Lopez
- Author: Meatball Fulton
- Music: Original score for Ruby, composed and performed by Tim Clark

=== Ruby 2: The Further Adventures of a Galactic Gumshoe (1985) ===
Ruby Two is hired to find out who's "windowing" the Bulldada.

- Ruby 2: Karen Young
- Ruby: Laura Esterman
- Rodant Kapoor, And/Or & Mother Kapoor: Tom Stewart
- T.J. Teru: Bill Raymond
- The Tookah, the Booger Man & Dr. Frank-n-furter: Fred Neuman
- Sam the Bardroid, Pisaro & Count Velcro: Peter Freedman
- "Big Money": Phoenix
- Sal the Robot: Eve Benton-Gordon
- The Bulldada, the Native Robot Guide & the Minotaur: Walter Cotton
- Mother Koan: Ellen MacLeDuff
- Julio "Hot Stuff" Sanchez: Gregorio Rosenblum
- Horace Wimpy: David Brisbane
- Ozymandias: John Wynn-Evans
- The Digital Dentist: Skip Pink
- Betty & Teddy: Phoenix & Tom Stewart
- The Chorus of Tykes: Jacob Fruchter
- The Announcer: Dave Herman with assistance from Tom Stewart
- Executive Producer & Director: Thomas Lopez
- Written by Meatball Fulton (in deep collaboration with Phoenix)
- Music: Tim Clark

=== Ruby 3: The Underworld / The Invisible World (1990–1991) ===
Part One: The Underworld:

Ruby is hired by the Aurorian Man Ray to trace a dark force entering Summa Nulla through the walls of Magnifico – City of Malls. Meanwhile, "techno-anthropologist" Inanna undertakes a quest to the dark and hellish Underworld to discover the meaning behind the mysterious "Seven Gates".

Part Two: The Invisible World:

Ruby, Inanna and Kapoor find themselves stranded in the Invisible World, where each of them is forced to confront the dark force in their own way.

- Ruby: Blanche Blackwell (Laura Esterman)
- T.J. Teru: Bill Raymond
- Inanna: Jona Harris
- Manray & Mustapha: Willy B
- Rodant Kapoor, And/Or & Mother Kapoor: Art Fairbain (Tom Stewart)
- Father Mojo: Dave Adams
- Sister Hoolooopoo: Gretel
- Junior Kapoor: Nebadon Adams
- Imogene Kapoor: Dalia Schneier
- Maharini: Valeria Vasilevski
- The Inky: Felix Avocado
- Mister Concertina: Andre Adler
- Molet the Mole & Tookah 2: Gregorio Rosenblum
- The Android Sisters: Ruth Maleczech (previously credited as Ruth Breuer) & Valeria Vasilevski
- The Big Scuzz: Greg Merton
- Toadface: Terry O'Reilly
- Clay People and Punishing Stones: Terry O'Reilly, Greg Merton & Felix Avocado
- Zumzammim: Remly Hodgekiss
- Ringmaster: John McDonough
- Bartender: Ruth Maleczech
- Roger Robot: Hoopy Lewis
- Dr. Lazer: Leslie Blanford
- Monet: Karras Berlin
- Narrator: Kirby Airs
- Executive Producer & Director: Thomas Manuel Lopez
- Story by Thomas Lopez & Marcia Dale Lopez
- Script by Meatball Fulton
- Music Composed and Performed by Tim Clark

=== Ruby 4: The Moon Coins of Sonto Lore (1994–1995) ===
Part One: The Moon Coins of Sonto Lore

Ruby is hired by Marimba Mambo to find the four Moon Coins of Sonto Lore - the mythical fourth moon of Summa Nulla. The investigation accidentally uncovers a planned invasion by extra-dimensional Reptoids.

Part Two: The Turban of El Morya

And/Or attempts to build an invisible "light machine" on the orders of Nikola Tesla (who may have a hidden agenda of his own), while Teru is held prisoner on the Reptoid planet.

Part Three: Dark Night of the Reptoids

Ruby returns to the Reptoid planet in an attempt to rescue Teru.

Part Four: Mad Moon for Rubina

Summa Nulla is pulled into the fifth dimension... with cataclysmic consequences!

- Ruby: Blanche Blackwell (Laura Esterman)
- T.J. Teru: Bill Raymond
- Rodant Kapoor, And/Or & Mother Kapoor: Art Fairbain (Tom Stewart)
- Nikola Tesla, François the Robot, Zandero, E. Gad (Man in Café): Jim Cantell
- Rubina: Katja Frazier
- Toots Mutant: Ruth Maleczech
- Marimba Mambo: Gregorio Rosenblum
- Reppies: Rob Harari
- Mino Loonga: Leslie Blandford
- The Creeper: Felix Avocado
- Father Mojo: Dave Adams
- Producer/Director: Tom Lopez
- Story: Tom & Marcia Dale Lopez (Part 1), Meatball Fulton (Parts 2–4)
- Script: Meatball Fulton
- Music: Tim Clark

=== Ruby 5: The Land of Zoots (1998) ===
Ruby is hired by President Koonstar Bootstah to find out who created the Land of Zoots, a fantasy land that has stated to be made real by the inhabitants of the Awakening Archipelago.

- Ruby: Blanche Blackwell (Laura Esterman)
- T.J. Teru: Hamilton Dobbs (Bill Raymond)
- Toots Mutant: Ruth Maleczech
- Rodant Kapoor, And/Or, Mother Kapoor, Mr. Bubble & Big Teddy: Art Fairbain (Tom Stewart)
- François, Freddie Foo Foo, Prof Magnolia Warbler, Little Teddy, Palsy Walsy Panda, Prof Toto LeToe: Jim Cantell
- Angel Eyes, Coonstar Boostah, Barbie Bazooms: Rene Augesen
- Mr. Mollusk, The Wizard of Zoots: Bill Hufnagle
- The Android Sisters: Ruth Maleczech & Valeria Vasilevski
- The Balluka: Ida Faiella
- Narrator: Kirby Airs
- Director: Tom Lopez
- Script: Meatball Fulton
- Music: Tim Clark

=== Ruby 6: The Illusionati (2001) ===
Ruby is hired by Oop Boop, an Illuboo from the planet Illuboo Roi, to uncover members of the Illuboo secret society, the Illusionati.

- Ruby: Blanche Blackwell (Laura Esterman)
- T.J. Teru: Bill Raymond
- Rodant Kapoor, And/Or & Mother Kapoor: Art Fairbain (Tom Stewart)
- Angel Babe & Lady Bassoon: Shelley Williams
- Boom-Boom Bassoon: Bill Westonberg
- Sue Foo: Leslie Blandford
- Cream Puff & Yummy Yaszoom: Nathan Robbins
- Ambassador Woogie & Ringmaster: Neu Fredmann
- Narrator: Kirby Airs
- Producer/Director: Tom Lopez
- Writer: Meatball Fulton
- Music: Tim Clark

=== Ruby 6.5: Far Flung Farouk (2004) ===
Ruby, Teru, Kapoor, and And/Or are hired to investigate the royal tomb of Far Flung Farouk.

- Ruby: Blanche Blackwell (Laura Esterman)
- T.J. Teru: Bill Raymond
- Rodant Kapoor, And/Or & Wop Wop Bop: Art Fairbain (Tom Stewart)
- Captain Laconic & Prince Haw Hee Bop: Bill Blechingberg
- Producer/Director: Tom Lopez
- Writer: Meatball Fulton
- Music: Tim Clark

=== Ruby 7: Dream Weaver, Dream Deceiver (2006) ===
The Morpheusians are experiencing fear for the first time in their lives, and Ruby is hired to find out who, how and why.

- Ruby: Blanche Blackwell (Laura Esterman)
- T.J. Teru: Bill Raymond
- Rodant Kapoor, And/Or & Mother Kapoor: Art Fairbain (Tom Stewart)
- Angel Cheeks: Cheyenne Casebier
- Moliere & the Tookah: Neu Fredmann
- Moo, Ringmaster, Talking Loo, Alien & Clown: Nathan Robbins
- The Android Sisters: Ruth Maleczech & Valeria Vasilevski
- Producer/Director: Tom Lopez
- Script: Meatball Fulton
- Music: Tim Clark

=== Ruby 7.5: The Tookah's Tales (2008) ===
Ruby entices the Tookah to tell his strange tales of what it is like to live on other planets.

- Ruby: Blanche Blackwell (Laura Esterman)
- The Tookah: John McDonough
- Producer/Director: Tom Lopez
- Story and Script: Meatball Fulton
- Music: Tim Clark

=== Ruby 8: The Good King Kapoor (2009) ===
Ruby is hired by Mother Kapoor to bring home her son Rodant, who is hiding out in another universe.

- Ruby: Blanche Blackwell (Laura Esterman)
- T.J. Teru: Bill Raymond
- Rodant Kapoor, And/Or & Mother Kapoor: Art Fairbain (Tom Stewart)
- Onoffon: Ruth Maleczech
- Offonoff & Woman: Leslie Geraci
- Wazir & Reptoids: Tom Robbins
- The Narrator: Dave Herman
- Producer/Director: Tom Lopez
- Story & Script: Meatball Fulton
- Music: Tim Clark

=== Ruby 9: Masque of the Red Moon (2012) ===
Two preview chapters of Ruby 9 were posted on the ZBS website in July 2012. The two chapters, "The City of Lost Illusions" and "The Hoochie Coochie Club" feature the series' main cast (Laura Esterman as Ruby, Bill Raymond as T.J. Teru and Tom Stewart as And/Or and Rodant Kapoor). The story involves the four characters going undercover on a steampunk-inspired planet.

- Ruby: Blanche Blackwell (Laura Esterman)
- T.J. Teru: Bill Raymond
- Rodant Kapoor, And/Or & Mother Kapoor: Tom Stewart
- Producer/Director: Tom Lopez
- Story & Script: Meatball Fulton
- Music: Tim Clark

=== Ruby 9.5: Who Knows How This Ends? (2015) ===
Deep in the jungles of the Great Zeezeeboos, on the planet of Summa Nulla, is the spiral city of Oroboros, once known as The City of the Future. But the future has passed, and Oroboros has been abandoned, or so everyone believed.

- Ruby: Blanche Blackwell (Laura Esterman)
- T.J. Teru: Bill Raymond
- Rodant Kapoor, And/Or & Mother Kapoor: Tom Stewart
- Producer/Director: Tom Lopez
- Story & Script: Meatball Fulton
- Music: Tim Clark

=== Ruby 10: The Black Star of Summa Nulla (2018) 60 minutes ===
Ruby is back, and this time she’s out looking to twist Kapoor’s little neck. Yes, the Rodent has gotten her into yet another mess. How this came about – Kapoor started his own detective agency. He doesn’t call himself a P.I. (Private Investigator), he calls himself a P.S. (Private Snoop). But then he accepts a case that’s way over his head. It’s about a gemstone called The Black Star of Summa Nulla, a stone some people believe can predict the future.

Moliere, Chief of the Mole People, dug up the stone on one of his digs. Moliere believes the Black Star is not from this planet, in fact it’s so dangerous, it was meant to be buried away forever. And when Kapoor gets his little paws on the priceless gemstone, everyone is out looking for him!

But he’s hiding. And where is Rodant hiding? He’s somewhere in “The Big Boohoos,” a sector of Summa Nulla where the rains never cease.

=== Ruby 11: Little Fritzi and the Wonder Game (2023) 74 minutes ===
Ruby is hired to find a little girl who has disappeared into Siddhi Infini, an ancient oasis city in the Great Summa Nulla desert. The girl is a Fritzoid, she can stop her growth and appear to be a child, though she may be decades older.

When Ruby gathers her group together – And/Or, Rodant Kapoor, and T.J. Teru – she discovers T.J. has retired, he has sold his excavation business to Seymour Sneel, a fellow archaeologist who was tossed out of Siddhi Infini for wanting to activate the Wonder Game.

The Wonder Game is an ancient Nullian game that no one knows to how to play … and those who try, may find the game is playing them.

=== Ruby 12: Can We Ever Turn Into Light? (2024) 70 minutes ===
Ruby is in Siddhi Infini, a desert oasis city. She has been hired by a criminal group called “The Element.” They want to know the source of this little city’s power.

Bootsy decides to build “the source.” She builds a Nullian Game Machine, it’s a sort of imitation “Wonder Game.” She puts together parts of ancient games that Seymour and Teru had dug up. She builds a dangerous game.

The four-tentacled Tookah has been told by a soothsayer, “The Soother,” there is a city beneath Siddhi Infini. The Tookah hires Seymour, an archaeologist, to go down below.

Meanwhile, performing on the surface is And/Or’s “Semi-Circle” Digital Circus. Rodant Kapoor is the Ringmaster. He has been teaching Big Charlie, a huge animaloid mammoth, how to walk a tightrope without squashing anyone.

And down below, Seymour does discover an ancient City-Beneath-a-City, and he is spooked.

=== Ruby 14: Spooks of the Ancient Nullians (2024)60 minutes ===
Ruby is hired to investigate a mysterious forbidden location called "The Center". It is sacred to some and forbidden to others. Some say, those who go in may never come out.

Meanwhile, the Digital Circus is back with three-rings. Nightmare Ellie is hired to play The Evil Clown. She scares the hell out of the local Infinis because she knows – when Evil is good, it’s really BAD.

Bootsy the android becomes an Aerialist. She dances at the top of the Big Top. But she wants to be a detective, she wants to be like a Ruby – kick-ass tough.

The Little Fritzi appears in Kapoor’s dreams. She lives on a far-off planet, she is like a small child with strange, otherworldly abilities. She knows what you are thinking.

Tim Clark’s music is non-stop. Fulton writes in black & white – Tim turns his words into techno-color.

=== Ruby 15: Creatures of the Light (2025) 66 Minutes ===
In the oasis city of Siddhi Infini, is a secret city called, “The Center.” Streets that go in, never do, they just circle around. They say The Center is sacred, few outsides have ever entered, but Roadie Kapoor has found a way to sneak in.

Nightmare Ellie is asked to do a circus act with a cat named “Whiskers.” It’s a dangerous act, because Whiskers is a very large Saber-Tooth, Killer Cat.

In “The Café of Fond Farewell,” Ruby pays tribute to her dear friend, Professor T.J. Teru. Ruby recalls the day T.J. found his old android love, Angel Lips, standing under a street light on the boulevard of forgotten dreams.

== Pilots ==
- "Tired of the Green Menace"

The pilot for the Ruby series. Ruby Tuesday is hired by Colonel Abulah Abdullah to find out who has stolen Cleo, a small planet from Saudi Asteroidia in the Middle Eastern star cluster. Her only lead is the Advanced Fulcrum Magnetic Works of Fong on the planet of Dong-A-Long, who while previously unknown have recently appeared with highly sophisticated technology to move large asteroids around for easy mining.

- "Rebel from Utopia"

Ruby Star is hired by Kapoor to locate "Mr. X", an earthling.

== Spinoff ==
=== Ol' Cactus Kapoor (2006) ===
In 2006, ZBS released a collection of nine stories about Rodant Kapoor, Ol’ Cactus Kapoor and Other Prickly Tales. The collection included "Ol' Cactus Kapoor", "The Colossal Kapoor", "The Seven Sacred Sapphires of Kapoor", "Judge Rodant and The Rest of The Rats", "Extract of Little Fooie", "The Purple Purse", "The 12 Famous Land Sharks School", "Trader Kapoor and The Woolie Boolies", and "How Real Is Real Anyway?"

== Major characters ==
- Ruby, a galactic gumshoe hired in each series to investigate a usually existential mystery. She has the ability to slow time and her favorite weapon is the powerful and extremely noisy Smith-Hitachi Godzilla Blaster (later replaced by the Smith-Hitachi Godzilla Blunderbuss Blaster). (Played by Laura Esterman, credited as "Blanche Blackwell" from Ruby 3 on)
- T. J. Teru, a human archaeologist whose life work is uncovering artifacts left by the ancient Nullian people who once inhabited the planet where the series takes place. Often helps Ruby with his investigations; has a fetish for plastic, especially when it is part of female androids. He was bedeviled by the And/Or Sisters in their guises of "Dr. Lazar" and "Dr. Duck" in Ruby 3, but by the story's end actually ended up by enjoying it. In Ruby 4, he becomes friends with Francois the Robot Waiter. His first non-android relationship takes place in Ruby 6, only to come to a tragic end. (Played by Bill Raymond)
- Rodant Kapoor, in some series described as a Kapoorian; his physical description includes a pointed nose, beady little eyes, protruding front teeth and a tail; a running joke throughout the series is his constantly being called "Rodent" by everyone instead of "Rodant" and being referred to as "a sneaky little rat". He hired Ruby in the original series and has since been an often maligned companion of hers, and he spends a great deal of time trying to escape/hide from his mother. (Played by Tom Stewart, credited as "Art Fairbain" from Ruby 3 on)
- Mustapha, Ruby's aircar; in appearance, he resembles a 1949 Mercury and speaks with an electronic Arabian accent. He is completely loyal to Ruby. (Played by Willy B)
- Mother Kapoor, Rodant's mother, who tracks him down wherever he goes to escape her and drags him home (occasionally hiring Ruby to find him). (Played by Tom Stewart, credited as "Art Fairbain" from Ruby 3 on)
- And/Or, a techie for the Digital Circus, a group of hackers who put on technological performances and revere Nikola Tesla. He creates many of the esoteric gadgets and devices Ruby uses in her cases and in Ruby 3 created a pair of sisters for himself, the And/Or Sisters, who for a time replaced the Android Sisters at the Digital Circus. (Played by Tom Stewart, credited as "Art Fairbain" from Ruby 3 on)
- Onoffon and Offonoff, two "techno-witches", also from the Digital Circus. (Played by Honora Ferguson and Valeria Vasilevski)
- The Tookah, a creature with four tentacles, three eyes, a thin blue mustache and a red fez. The original Tookah was blown up (inflated to a point where he exploded) in the original Ruby series. He often acts as an information source for Ruby's investigations, and he returns/survives by cloning himself; by the time of Ruby 7, he is in his 22nd incarnation. (Played by Fred Neuman)
- Angel Lips, an android and former companion of Teru who has been programmed to be self-programming, thus giving her a will of her own. She made a short appearance and came to a final end in Ruby 3. A similar female android, "Angel Eyes", was offered to Teru as a payment/bribe in Ruby 5 but eventually left him too, returning in Ruby 6 only to be destroyed in an act of sabotage.
- Molière, chief of the Mole People who dig the same archeological sites as Teru (only from underneath); he first appeared in the original Ruby series and returned in Ruby 7. His brother Molay appears in Ruby 3 and his cousin Mole-ecule appears in Ruby 5. (Played by Fred Neuman)
- Francois, a robot and head waiter at the Cafe Garçon. (Played by Jim Cantell)
- Toots Mutant, part human and part reptoid; originally Toots Malacca before she changed her name, an archaeologist and once the leader of the Zoot Mutants, a gang of techno-punks who are sometime allies of Ruby. (Played by Kara Duff McCormick in Ruby 1, Ruth Maleczech in Ruby 4)
- The Android Sisters, who perform satirical speak-songs. Three albums of their speak-songs were released by ZBS Foundation and are currently available through ZBS and on Amazon.com: The Android Sisters' Greatest Hits, The Android Sisters – Pull No Punches and The Best of the Android Sisters. (Played by Ruth Breuer and Valaria Vasilevski)
- The Slimies, bio-engineered assassins who are often after Ruby and the gang. Slimies hunt by weaving "mind webs" to freeze and catch you in their thoughts. They also explode when they're killed.
- Nikola Tesla, the famous electrical engineer and inventor, resurrected as an electronic ghost and revered by the Digital Circus as a "guardian spirit". (Played by Jim Cantell in Ruby 4)
