= Dreams of Rio =

ZBS Foundation radio drama story

- Genre: Comedy drama
- Running time: 5 hours 45 minutes
- Country of origin: United States
- Language: English
- Starring: Robert Lorick
- Written by: Thomas Lopez
- Directed by: Thomas Lopez
- Recording studio: United States
- Original release: 1987
- Website: http://www.zbs.org/

Jack Flanders chronology
The Incredible Adventures of Jack Flanders (1978)	Dreams Of Rio (1987)	Dreams of the Amazon (1992)

Dreams of Rio is a radio drama, produced by the ZBS Foundation. It is the fifth of the Jack Flanders adventure series, and combines elements of American culture and Old-time radio with themes of lost cities, jungle exploration and shamanism. It immediately precedes but is not part of the "Travels with Jack" adventures, each of which is entitled Dreams of ...

== Recording and Writing ==
Thomas Lopez, the author and director, of the drama spent a month in Brazil digitally recording sounds of the Amazonian rain forest and Brazilian cities. He first recorded the location sounds and then wrote the story around the sounds he recorded. More than 20 hours of sounds were recorded by Lopez in Brazil to be used for the story's aural setting. The story's script continued to evolve as Lopez worked with the drama's actors and composer, Tim Clark.

== Plot ==
Despairing of a United States where consumerism has completely taken hold, Jack, while trying to escape the endless mall, has a chance encounter with Short Top Detroit that sends him off to Rio de Janeiro and into possession of a mysterious crystal skull. Dodging crooks, Candomblé practitioners and vampire bats, Jack journeys deep into the jungle with a beautiful anthropologist, in search of a lost city, finding time to fall in love along the way.

Meanwhile, Short Top bumps into Miranda and they drift around the city together, discovering their mutual love of Carmen Miranda.

== Notes & themes ==
This adventure marked a major departure from the previous stories in that it is set entirely in 'the real world' - Jack does not travel to any of the Invisible Realms.

Although not mentioned in this story it marks the beginning of the "Jungle Jack" aspect of his character. Previously his aspect had been that of a shaman and later "Captain Jack" is added.

Lopez planned for Little Frieda to appear in Dreams of Rio, but actress P.J. Orte wasn't interested in returning. In her place, Sabine Thomson appeared as "Big Frieda". Orte eventually returned to the character in 2000 for Return to Inverness.

There is a strong ecological theme running through the story illustrating the mass consumption of a consumer society and the destruction this is wreaking in the third world and in particular the Amazon rainforest. "You can't do a story of the Amazon without bringing in the destruction of the Amazon," Lopez said.

== Quotes ==
Voice: "On Wednesday, all the malls across America connected. They merged into one gigantic endless mall."
Jack: "You mean America has only one shopping mall?"
Voice: "America IS one shopping mall."
Jack: "You mean we've been--"
Voice: "--Yes. Malled from stem to stern."

Carmen: "I don't want him."
Frieda: "Well that's good because he has someone else, she has him now."
Carmen: "Who?"
Jack: "It's just some snake goddess who came out of the skull, it's nothing, really."

== Credits ==
- Jack Flanders - Robert Lorick
- Mojo Sam - Dave Adams
- Carla D'Avila - Lia Moraes
- Paulo Pompadora - Andre Adler
- Carmen Valderrama- Virginia Rambal
- Short Top Detroit - Bill Raymond
- Claudia Guedes & Gas Station Attendant - Claudia Zagarodne
- (Big) Frieda Adler - Sabine Thomson
- Professor Klaus Vargas - George Ernst
- Maia Josefa & Talking Statue - Maria Pompeu
- Zeca & Museum Guard - Zeca Ligiero
- Senior Bulldoza - Gregorio Rosenblum
- Kelley - Gail Pawell
- Short Top's Secretary - Hillary Mayall
- Narrator - Dave Herman
- João - Illion Tryna
- Author - Meatball Fulton
- Director - Tom Lopez
- Executive Producer - Thomas Manuel Lopez
- Associate Producer and Graphics - Jaye Oliver
- Engineers - Robert Harrari, Fulton & Clark
- Composer - Tim Clark
- Illustration - Alan Okamoto
- Promotions Director - Kathy Grownow

Voices Recorded at 39th St Music Productions
Post Production at ZBS
Ambiance Digitally Recorded in Brazil by Fulton and Clark

Special thanks to Ruth Hirshman, Roberto Zuazo, and Robert Durand. Also, thanks to Kathy Gronau, Sarah Spitz, and Carolee Brockway.

Series Produced with Funds Provided by the Corporation for Public Broadcasting, NPR's Satellite Program Development Fund, New York State Council on the Arts, the National Endowment for the Arts and Santa Montica College Station KCRW. Also, assistance from Varig Airlines, Brazilian Tourist Commission, Omni Magazine and Pan American World Airways. Photographic products by Vivitar.
