= Moon Over Morocco (radio series) =

ZBS Foundation radio drama series

- Genre: Comedy drama
- Running time: 9 hours 35 minutes
- Country of origin: United States
- Language: English
- Starring: Robert Lorick; Robert Lesser; Dave Adams
- Announcer: Dave Herman
- Written by: Thomas Lopez
- Directed by: Thomas Lopez
- Recording studio: United States; Morocco
- Original release: 1974
- No. of episodes: 50
- Website: http://www.zbs.org/

Jack Flanders chronology
The Fourth Tower of Inverness (1972)	Moon Over Morocco (1974)	The Ah-Ha Phenomenon (1977)

Moon Over Morocco is a 1974 radio drama, the second in ZBS's Jack Flanders series. Originally broadcast as fifty twelve-minute episodes, the serial was written and directed by Meatball Fulton.

== History ==
Following on the success of The Fourth Tower of Inverness, Fulton set about working on a sequel in 1973. Fulton described the story "a mystery fantasy with a whiff of 'Casablanca' about it". It was set in Morocco where he spent a month recording ambient sounds and music for the production. Fulton stayed with the writer Paul Bowles in Tangier and learned about Moroccan magic practices from him.

Fulton recorded location sound throughout Morocco, including the courtyard of Bowles' villa in Marrakesh. The production also used traditional Moroccan music recorded by Bowles for the festival scenes. The recordings helped inspire his writing, Fulton told Billboard magazine. "It's so real, you'll even be able to smell the flowers and spice and dry earth of Morocco. Ah, yes. Escapism at its finest," he said.

== Synopsis ==
Jack Flanders arrives in Tangier on a search for sites that lie along "ley lines", undercurrents of mystical energy described in ancient texts. He meets Kasbah Kelly, an expatriate bar owner, and Kelly's assistant Mojo Sam and befriends one of the bar's customers, Sunny Skies. He also visits the Comtese Zazeenia, an expatriate holdover from Morocco's French colonial days and an old enemy of Kelly's.

Strange events begin to occur: Jack is pursued by owls, his hotel room crumbles away as the hotel disintegrates around him and a mysterious woman named Layla Oolupi warns him to leave Morocco immediately. Refusing to heed her warning, Jack instead travels to a music festival in Marrakesh with Kelly and Sunny. Caught up in a traditional dance, Jack begins to disappear into an invisible world straight out of Moroccan legend. This first night, Kelly tackles him and prevents his disappearance, but the next night, Jack succeeds in completing the transition into the land of legend. Kelly's intervention causes Jack to (seemingly) split into two rival figures in this alternate world, a usurper Emperor (Hassan Bizel) and an upstart claimant to the throne, known as the Son of El Kabah.

Kelly, Mojo and Sunny search for Jack in our world, while the two Jacks confront one another after the "Son of el Kabah" completes a long journey through the Sahara desert, accompanied by Little Flossic (revisiting the "Little Frieda" role of The Fourth Tower of Inverness).

== Music ==
In the series there are some musical interludes, including:

- "You Go to My Head" and "Black Forrest" from Black Forrest – Jimmy Forrest
- "The Riff Song," "The Desert Song," and other songs from The Desert Song – Gordon MacRae, Dorothy Kirsten, and cast
- "Something Fine" – Jackson Browne

== Credits ==
Cast

- Jack Flanders / King Hassan Bizel / El Kabah - Robert Lorick
- Kasbah Kelly / The Gate Keeper - Robert Lesser
- Mojo Sam, the Yoodoo Man - Dave Adams
- Little Flossic - P.J. Orte (Billed as Spooner Duffy)
- Sunny Skies / Fatma Tajhem - Lee Berg
- Layla Oolupi - Chitra Neogy
- Queen Azora - Jane Traum
- Narrator / Grand Wazir - Dave Herman
- Storyteller Mustafa - Taurean Blacque
- Comtese Zazeenia - Valerie Mamches
- Abu - Meatball Fulton
- Taxi Driver - Mad Max
- Marmaduke - Michael Roach
- Others: Gail Turner, Bill Moskowitz, Richard Shanks, Charlotte Mason & Mark Stone

Crew

- Mojo's Piano - The Incomparable George Schutz
- Incidental Music - Randy Cohen, Dennis Colin
- Additional Music - Tim Clark
- Producer / Director - Tom Lopez
- Story & Script - Meatball Fulton
- Engineer - Bobby Bielecki
- Front Illustration - David Byrd
- Back Illustration - Alan Okamoto
- Moroccan environments recorded by M. Fulton
- Moroccan Music recorded by Paul Bowles

Production was made possible by Robert Durand. CD pressing made possible by John Romkey.
