= ZBS Foundation =

Non-profit audio production company

ZBS Foundation is an American non-profit audio production company, founded by Thomas Lopez (aka "Meatball Fulton") in 1970 with a grant from Robert E. Durand as a working commune, located on a donated farm in Upstate New York. ZBS stands for "Zero Bull Shit". The commune's purpose was to raise consciousness through media, specifically full-cast audio dramas. The foundation is "one of the most prolific producers of contemporary radio drama."

The commune started with 18 people, and an island in the Hudson River was chosen as the location because it was between New York City and Montreal. Eventually, the commune disintegrated, and the foundation moved to create an artists-in-residence program over the next decade. Allen Ginsberg recorded at ZBS in 1981, and Laurie Anderson visited in 1975. Philip Glass also worked on the opera Einstein on the Beach at ZBS. The residency program ended in the mid 1980s.

The foundation also became the outlet for audio dramas written by writer/producer Lopez. His dramatic programs, notably Ruby the Galactic Gumshoe, The Fourth Tower of Inverness and Travels with Jack Flanders, are noted for their meticulous production values and New Age mysticism. Lopez has won numerous awards including the Prix Italia, and his work enjoys a cult following.

ZBS did a 1984–85 radio series, The Cabinet of Dr. Fritz, later releasing some shows in the series on cassettes and CDs. These productions were recorded binaurally using a Neumann Ku81 Kunstkopf microphone. ZBS also produced a widely acclaimed dramatization of Stephen King's The Mist, recording in binaural sound.

== Releases ==
Title	Released	Series	Notes
Ha! Fat Chance	1963		Meatball Fulton's first radio drama, produced at KPFA Pacifica Radio. This story predates the founding of ZBS, but was released on the ZBS site to streaming subscribers.
The Fourth Tower of Inverness	1972	Jack Flanders	
Moon Over Morocco	1973	Jack Flanders	
Stars & Stuff	1977	Science Fiction	includes The Ah-Ha Phenomenon, Tired of the Green Menace, The Adventures of Rocket Pierre, The Thing That Ate Aunt Sophie, Boogie Woogie to the Stars, and more
The Ah-Ha Phenomenon	1977	Jack Flanders	Originally part of Stars & Stuff
Tired of the Green Menace	1977	Ruby	The original Ruby the Galactic Gumshoe story, originally part of Stars and Stuff
The Incredible Adventures of Jack Flanders	1978	Jack Flanders	
The Taj Express	1980	Drama	Features stories written by contemporary Indian writers
Ruby: The Adventures of a Galactic Gumshoe	1982	Ruby	
The Android Sisters: Songs of Electronic Despair	1984	Android Sisters	Spinoff of Ruby
The Cabinet of Dr. Fritz	1984–1985	Science Fiction, Drama, Horror	Including The Mist, Mumbo Jumbo, Aura, Sticks, The Bleeding Man and Saturday Night at the White Woman Watching Hole, recorded in binaural sound
Ruby 2: The Further Adventures of a Galactic Gumshoe	1985	Ruby	
Starflight One	1986	Music	Music by Tim Clark
Dreams of Rio	1987	Jack Flanders	
Music from the Dreams of Rio	1987	Soundtrack	Music featured in Dreams of Rio
Myth: The Music of Tim Clark	1987	Music	Music by Tim Clark
A Night on the Rio Negro	1987	Soundtrack	Background audio featured in Dreams of Rio
Saratoga Springs	1989	Humor	Produced as a series for National Public Radio
Tales of the Sun People	1990	Music	Music by Tim Clark
Ruby 3: The Underworld/The Invisible World	1990–1991	Ruby	
Dishpan Fantasy: A Real Soap Opera	1991	Humor	
The Music from Ruby 3	1991	Soundtrack	Music featured in Ruby 3
Travels with Jack	1992–1993	Jack Flanders	Includes Dreams of the Amazon, Dreams of India, Dreams of Bali and Dreams of Sumatra
Journey to Qayyum	1992	Soundtrack	Music featured in Dreams of India
Dinotopia	1993	Dinotopia	Adaptation of the book by James Gurney
The Maltese Goddess	1994	Mystery	Recorded in binaural sound
Ruby 4	1994–1995	Ruby	Includes The Moon Coins of Sonto Lore, The Turban of El Morya, Dark Night of the Reptoids, and Mad Moon for Rubina
rain	1995	Music	Music by Tim Clark and Kevin Breheney
Dinotopia: The World Beneath	1996	Dinotopia	
The Spell	1996	Music	Music by Tim Clark and Kevin Breheny
O Boy O Boy O	1996	Science Fiction	Recorded in binaural sound
The Mystery of Jaguar Reef	1996	Jack Flanders	
The Land of Enchantment	1997	Mojo Sam	Spinoff of Jack Flanders
Ol' Cactus Kapoor, and Other Prickly Tales	1997	Rodant Kapoor	Spinoff of Ruby
The Insiders' Lounge	1998	Science Fiction	
Midnight at the Casa Luna	1998–2000	Jack Flanders	
Ruby 5: The Land of Zoots	1998	Ruby	
Fat Cats	1999	Fat Cats	Later reissued as Saratoga Fat Cats, recorded in binaural sound
Recipe for Murder	1999	Mystery	
The Android Sisters: Greatest Hits	2000	Android Sisters	Spinoff of Ruby
Return to Inverness	2000	Jack Flanders	
Little Frieda's Life Lessons	2001	Little Frieda	Spinoff of Jack Flanders
Mojo Plays Morocco	1977	Soundtrack	Mojo Sam's music from Moon Over Morocco
Mojo's Concert at Inverness	2001	Soundtrack	Mojo Sam's music from Return to Inverness
Ruby 6: The Illusionati	2001	Ruby	
The Ultimate 3D Thunderstorm	2001	Soundtrack	Binaural recording of a thunderstorm
Travelling Jack	2002–2003	Jack Flanders	Includes Dreams of the Blue Morpho, Somewhere Next Door to Reality, Do That in Real Life?, and The Eye of Van Gogh
The Android Sisters: Pull No Punches	2003	Android Sisters	Spinoff of Ruby
The Best of the Android Sisters	2004	Android Sisters	Spinoff of Ruby, released in Japan
The Best of Saratoga Springs	2004	Humor	Compilation of Saratoga Springs episodes
Fat Cats 2: All the Cat's Meow	2004	Fat Cats	
Ruby 6.5: Far Flung Farouk	2004	Ruby	
A Streetcar Named Le Petit Lafitte	2004	Little Louie Lafitte	Spinoff of Jack Flanders' Do That in Real Life?
The Wee Weever: A Little Frieda Mystery	2004	Little Frieda, Mojo Sam	Spinoff of Jack Flanders
The Case of the Disappearing Witch	2005	Little Frieda, Mojo Sam	Spinoff of Jack Flanders
The Fantastic Voyages of Captain Jack Flanders	2005–2008	Jack Flanders	Includes Orchids and Moonbeams, The Ghost Islands, Tropical Hot Dog Night and The White Castle
Ruby 7: Dream Weaver, Dream Deceiver	2006	Ruby	
90 Second Cellphone Chillin' Theater	2008	Humor	
Blue Bamboo	2008	Music	Music by Tim Clark
Dinotopia Suite	2008	Soundtrack	Music from Dinotopia
Two Minute Film Noir	2008	Film Noir	
More! Two Minute Film Noir - "Joe & Moe"	2008	Film Noir	
The Music from Ruby 4	2008	Soundtrack	Music from Ruby 4
Ruby 7.5: The Tookah's Tales	2008	The Tookah	Spinoff of Ruby
The World Beneath Suite	2008	Soundtrack	Music from Dinotopia: The World Beneath
Even More! Two Minute Film Noir	2009	Film Noir	
Four Minute Film Noir	2009	Film Noir	
Fallen Angels That Bounce	2009	Film Noir	
Mojo's Vest Pocket Voodoo Adventures	2009	Mojo Sam	Spinoff of Jack Flanders
Ruby 8: The Good King Kapoor	2009	Ruby	
World Sounds	2009	Soundtrack	Audio used in Jack Flanders adventures
Steam Dreamers of Inverness	2010–2011	Jack Flanders	Steampunk spinoff, 4 parts
Lady Windermere's Brass Fantabulous	2010	Lady Windermere	
Lady Windermere's Brass Fantabulous, Part 2: You Can't Outrun the Flying Dead	2011	Lady Windermere	
Ruby Refreshed	2011–2013	Ruby	A reissue of the original Ruby: The Galactic Gumshoe, with new music and sound effects
Do Angels Really Have Wings?	2012	Jack Flanders	
Ruby 9: Masque of the Red Moon	2012	Ruby	
Dixon and Sparks: Excuse Me While I Disappear	2013	Dixon and Sparks	
Dixon and Sparks: The Night Has Begun	2013	Dixon and Sparks	
Dreams of Tiffany Blue	2013	Jack Flanders	
The Music of Steam Dreamers of Inverness	2013	Soundtrack	Music from Steam Dreamers of Inverness
The Music of the Tookah's Tales	2013	Soundtrack	Music from Ruby 7.5: The Tookah's Tales
Saratoga Noir	2014	Mystery	
The Secret of the Crystal Maidens	2014	Jack Flanders	
Dixon and Sparks: Shadows in the Night	2015	Dixon and Sparks	
The Green Velvet Chair	2015	Jack Flanders	
Ruby 9.5: Who Knows How This Ends?	2015	Ruby	
League of the Green Velvet Chairs	2016	Jack Flanders	
Tiny Dreams	2017	Humor	
Madonna in a Green Velvet Chair	2018	Jack Flanders	
Ruby 10: The Black Star of Summa Nulla	2018	Ruby	
Ruby 11: Little Fritzi and the Wonder Game	2023	Ruby	
Ruby 12: Can We Ever Turn Into Light?	2024	Ruby	
Ruby 14: Spooks of the Ancient Nullians	2024	Ruby	
