= Robert Lorick =

American actor

Robert Lorick (died January 2016) was a lyricist, actor, and writer, best known as a Broadway lyricist and for his work portraying Jack Flanders, the lead character in a series of ZBS Foundation audio adventures produced from 1972 until Lorick's death in 2016.

In 1972, Lorick made his debut as a lyricist with the Off-Broadway musical Hark! at the Mercer-O'Casey Theatre. In the 1980s, he wrote the lyrics for the Broadway show The Tap Dance Kid, which ran for 669 performances (Dec 83 - Aug 85) at the Broadhurst Theatre (capacity 1150) and the Minskoff Theatre (capacity 1620), New York and won two Tony Awards in 1984. He received a Grammy nomination for best cast album for The Tap Dance Kid.

Lorick also wrote for ABC's All My Children, Afterschool Specials, Disney's Polly Comin' Home and wrote the theme song for NBC's Millennium Special. His voiceover clients included Volvo, Cadillac, Ford, IBM, American Express, most of the world's leading fragrance houses, and he was the "voice of Chanel" for more than a decade. His corporation, Lorick, Inc., is a video production company, and he held a master's degree from Columbia University. He died in January 2016 after a period of kidney dialysis.
