= Thomas Lopez =

American writer (born 1935)

Thomas Lopez, aka Meatball Fulton (born 1935) is an American writer and producer known for working in audio drama as the co-founder and president of the ZBS Foundation. He writes and produces the ZBS Foundation's audio productions. When he was working in radio in the 1960s, Lopez took "Meatball Fulton" out of Rolling Stone as his nom de plume.

His output includes the entire Jack Flanders and Ruby the Galactic Gumshoe series. His stories are identified by the humorous, insightful and occasionally transcendental plots, plus puns and references to 1950s music. Lopez said his stories were not traditional radio drama. Rather, "they're like experiencing a dream state. When you are in a dream state, you can really free yourself from straight, linear narrative, and get more into thoughts, where anything is possible." He travels widely, recording environments from such locations as Morocco, Mexico, India, Bali, Sumatra, Java, Rio de Janeiro, the Amazon and the United States. These recordings have been used as ambient background sounds for ZBS Foundation audio dramas. Some of Lopez's dramas aired in 1984–85 as part of ZBS' stereo radio series, The Cabinet of Dr. Fritz.

Erik Bauersfeld's radio series The Black Mass was an influence on Lopez, who noted, "In the 1960s, I was inspired by someone at KPFA in Berkeley, Eric Bauersfeld, who did a series called The Black Mass, adaptations of H. P. Lovecraft and such. He helped me a lot. I consider Erik my mentor. He also did some fine Eugene O'Neill plays for radio."

In 1968, Lopez worked at WUHY, a Philadelphia public radio station. He had his own show Sunday night called Feed. He called himself Meatball Fulton, the Aunt Jemima of the underground. The name "started off as a joke," but he "decided to create this character, just another character, but this time [Lopez] would play it." Lopez has conducted audio interviews featuring such talents as Jerry Garcia, Jimi Hendrix, Don Van Vliet of Captain Beefheart and the Magic Band, Mel Blanc, Syd Barrett, Paul Bowles and Dinotopia's James Gurney. He has recorded a music album with Abbie Hoffman, appeared in an experimental film directed by Yoko Ono and provided the sound tapestry for the Mabou Mines stage production of Philip K. Dick's Flow My Tears, the Policeman Said.
