= Vanishing Point (CBC) =

Canadian radio drama series

- Cover art for 1994 Vanishing Point cassette collection
- Genre: Science fiction and horror anthology
- Running time: 30 minutes
- Country of origin: Canada
- Language: English
- Syndicates: CBC Radio
- Hosted by: David Calderisi
- Created by: William Lane
- Written by: Steve Petch, Rachel Wyatt, Alfred Silver, Alberto Manguel, Paul Milliken, Charles Tidler, Audrey Thomas, Cordelia Strube, David Widdicombe, Michael Riordan, Ken Gass, Tim Wynne-Jones, Colleen Curran, Lawrence Russell, Gordon Pengilly
- Executive producer: William Lane
- Original release: October 5, 1984 – January 3, 1992

Vanishing Point is a Canadian radio drama series produced and aired by CBC Radio from 1984 to 1986, and then under a variety of different subtitles until 1992. Created and produced by Bill Lane, Vanishing Point was the CBC’s follow-up to Nightfall, which had instilled new life into its many regional drama centers. Like that series, Vanishing Point drew staff and resources from the CBC's entire coast to coast network to mount what came to be regarded as one of the best CBC radio series.

While primarily a science fiction series, the anthology presented a wide range of genres including thriller, horror, detective, psychological drama, comedy and even the occasional musical. A number of episodes were adaptations of short stories from famous authors like Ray Bradbury, Roald Dahl or Evelyn Waugh, but many were original plays from Canada’s top talent. Bill Lane workshopped plays from the winners of various Canadian literary competitions as a way of “reaching an audience by developing the talents of new playwrights.”

== Format ==
The regular series ran for two seasons and began with a twice-a-week schedule, with a new episode airing each Friday on CBC-AM, and a re-run the following Monday on CBC Stereo.

The show took a hiatus in the summer of 1986 and returning in September with a six-episode adventure called The Black Persian, followed by a miniseries of modernized Nathaniel Hawthorne adaptations, setting a new direction for the series. Now Vanishing Point would act more as an umbrella program under which shorter miniseries would be developed. Some were serialized adaptations of classic science fiction works from authors like Arthur C. Clarke and Ursula K. Le Guin, while most were mini-anthologies, linked by a writer or theme. While still being promoted as Vanishing Point, these series all featured a unique title and opening. In some cases, two subseries ran simultaneously on different days of the week, creating considerable confusion for radio historians. Things continued like this for several years until Vanishing Point went off the air for good in January, 1992.

== Episodes ==
Below is a full list of the first two seasons of Vanishing Point (episodes 1-69), followed by highlights from its more irregular later run. While the series repeated episodes quite a bit, most of these reruns are not listed except when they help clarify. All episodes listed are around thirty minutes long.

#	Title	Notes	Airdate
1	The Testing Of Stanley Teagarden	On holiday in Jamaica, a woman finds herself intrigued by a fellow traveler and his obsession with perfecting a personality test. But the more questions she asks, the more terrifying the answers become. Written by Tim Wynne-Jones.	October 5, 1984
2	Disappearance	A bartender's quest for spiritual enlightenment leads him to question the importance of the material world. But as he finds himself plagued by a host of baffling disappearances, he - and the listener - must finally question the nature of reality itself. Written by David Helwig	October 12, 1984
3	The Rescue	A pair of marine biologists struggle to connect with their autistic son. Could their solution be swimming right in front of them? Written by Rafael Vigod	October 19, 1984
4	Death and the Compass	The mysterious murder of a Talmudic priest sends world famous Detective Lonnrot down a twisted path. Adapted by Alberto Manguel from the short story by Argentine writer and poet Jorge Luis Borges	October 26, 1984
5	Cage Of Light	The year is 2116 and a mission to find intelligent life in the universe has gone awry when the sole survivor returns with no memory of his journey. Now a jury of scientists must go on their own mission: into his subconscious. Written by Bill Gray	November 2, 1984
6	The Playground	The decision to enroll his son in a new play center forces a man to dig back into the pain of his own childhood. If only there were a way to spare his son the same trauma... Adaptation of Ray Bradbury's short story, dramatized by Martin Lager	November 2, 1984
7	The Bailiff And The Women	After a hard day's work in the Department of Social Welfare, it is a perfectly normal evening for Adrian Toope. That is, until he finds himself transported to a dream court, charged with a lifetime of crime. An acerbic work by Michael Cook	November 9, 1984
8	The Quickening	Laura and Peter are the perfect couple; everyone tells them so. But after an evening of rising tensions among their upwardly mobile crowd, their relationship suddenly takes an irreversible turn. The results are both absurd and shocking in this powerful first venture into radio by Judith Thompson, the author of the stage plays The Crackwalker and White Biting Dog	November 16, 1984
9	The Golden Triangle	Convinced his ex-wife has become an exotic dancer in the red light district, a bitter misogynist makes his best friend an indecent proposal. Written by Lawrence Russell	November 23, 1984
10	The Silenian Test	When a fleet of alien spacecraft appear in Earth’s atmosphere, they bring the promise of an extraordinary new peace... and for one man, a horrifying sacrifice. Written by David Lewis Stein	November 30, 1984
11	Teenage Catalogue Model	A young girl’s disappearance kicks off a tense game of cat and mouse between a shrewd police detective and a peculiar older gentleman. Written by Kent Thompson	December 7, 1984
12	How Love Came To Professor Guildea	A man of science is forced to question everything he believes when he finds himself pursued by a supernatural being. Robert Hichens' short story, dramatized by John Douglas	December 14, 1984
13	The Cave	W. D. Valgardson narrates this autobiographical tale about his Icelandic girlfriend and the mysterious cave that's obsessed her family for generations. Written by and starring W. D. Valgardson	December 21, 1984
14	The Lost Door	A middle aged man discovers his home has vanished and he's lost proof of his existence. Written by Steve Petch	December 28, 1984
15	The Blue Devil	A colony of women has survived a nuclear holocaust to create a new, matriarchal society, a world deliberately devoid of men. Written by Charles Tidler	January 4, 1985
16	Point Of Departure	Before leaving for a sun holiday, a woman is questioned by police about the husband she has not seen for five years. Written by Rachel Wyatt	January 11, 1985
17	Skin	A grasping art dealer spots the opportunity of a lifetime when he discovers a new work from a long-dead artist. Only problem? It is tattooed to an old man’s back. Adaptation of Roald Dahl's macabre short story, dramatized by Arthur Samuels	January 25, 1985
18	Phase Three	Convinced he's about to be replaced by a robot, an assembly line worker turns to desperate measures to ensure his family's financial security. Written by Bradd Burningham	February 1, 1985
19	The Addict	When her doctor refuses to prescribe any more pain medication, a paralegal falls into a downward spiral of crime, prostitution and maybe even murder. Written by George Ryga	February 8, 1985
20	Startex, B16-k	An outrageous satire about a “smart” coffee maker that first takes over a couple’s kitchen — then the world. Written by John Palmer	February 15, 1985
21	Meteor	Earth is being bombarded with meteor showers laden with the stardust of vanished solar systems. The earth has grown accustomed to these intrusions, humans have not. Adaptation of John Wyndham's short story, dramatized by David L. W. Pitt	February 22, 1985
22	Zeppi's Machine	A Trinidadian shop owner fights modernity by clinging to his folk remedies and received wisdom. But after a local robbery, will he turn to a computer to solve the crime? Written by Samuel Selvon	March 1, 1985
23	Evaluation	Two pilots, grounded in the frozen North by bad weather, succumb to the lure of a strange Inuk woman. Written by Steven Freygood	March 15, 1985
24	Free To A Good Home	Tom and Nancy promise one of the kittens they've advertised to their first caller. But the caller phoned before the newspaper ad even appeared, and seems to have an uncanny knowledge of the kitten's activities. Written by Paul Milliken	March 22, 1985
25	Uluru	On holiday in the Australian outback, a careless tourist mocks aboriginal customs and sacred sites. She's about to discover some ancient customs never went out of style... Written by Colleen Curran	March 29, 1985
26	The Third Bank Of The River	A Brazilian tells the story of his father who decided to leave their family and the whole society to live within a small canoe on a huge river. Adaptation of João Guimarães Rosa's moving short story, dramatized by Whitney Smith	April 5, 1985
27	Unlived Lives	A series of creepy phone calls and mysterious letters force a mild-mannered theater owner to reconsider the choices he's made in life. Written by David Helwig	April 12, 1985
28	Ground Zero	Terrified he will lose everyone he loves in a nuclear holocaust, an advertising exec becomes obsessed with keeping his family safe. But could his solution be worse than the problem? Written by Bryan Wade	April 19, 1985
29	Messages	A singer's telephone answering machine decides to take a hand in improving her career. Written by David King	April 26, 1985
30	The Shining Path	Larry’s sleepwalking has been getting worse but his therapist does not think it is anything to worry about. Maybe he'll change his mind when his wife is brutally murdered in the middle of the night. Written by Steve Petch	May 3, 1985
31	The Yellow Wallpaper	Charlotte Perkins Gilman's classic tale of isolation and madness. Starring Mary Vingoe, who originally adapted this version for the stage at Toronto's Nightwood Theatre in 1981.	May 10, 1985
32	The Woman In Black Velvet	A woman settling in Africa soon discovers she has much to learn about this strange new world... and the one beyond. Adaptation of “Joseph and His Brother,” Audrey Thomas’ eerie ghost story about neocolonialism. Music composed and performed by Obo Addy	May 17, 1985
33	Seeing God	Struggling with depression, a young mother checks herself into a cutting-edge psychiatric clinic. But she may not be ready for Dr. Cameron’s more radical techniques. Based on the real-life psychological and mind control experiments of Dr. Ewan Cameron, whose work was funded by the CIA's MKUltra program. Written by Carol Bolt. Final episode of Vanishing Point's first season, replaced for the summer by a 13-week run of ZBS' The Cabinet of Dr. Fritz then a few episodes of ZBS' The Taj Express	May 24, 1985
34	The Black Serpent	Vacationing on a Greek island, a woman has an encounter with a goddess. Written by Steve Petch. First episode of Vanishing Point's second season.	September 30, 1985
35	Nightmare In Rabbit City	An intergalactic rock opera about star-crossed lovers from warring planets. Text, music and lyrics by Keith McNair and performed by his musical group Sweet Lips	October 7, 1985
36	The Enormous Radio	A couple in an apartment acquire an unusual radio which picks up conversations from their neighbors in the building. Could anyone resist the temptation to learn all their neighbors' secrets? Adaptation of John Cheever's short story, dramatized by Tim Wynne-Jones	October 14, 1985
37	Curse Of The Unnamed Planet	An alien scout, disguised as a human child, is stranded on Earth. Later expanded into a four-part Vanishing Point miniseries in the Spring of 1987. Starring Saul Rubinek Written by Alfred Silver	October 21, 1985
38	Secret Ceremony	A case of mistaken identity lands an aging prostitute in the ornate home of a mentality disabled young woman. Playing along as the woman’s deceased mother, she soon discovers Mom is not the only skeleton in this family’s closet. Adaptation of Marco Denevi’s short story "Ceremonia secreta" dramatized by Alberto Manguel	October 28, 1985
39	In The Groove	On a motorcycle road trip, a man and his son meet a worker at a roadside diner who claims to have a dead girl's memories. Adapted from Audrey Thomas's short story	November 4, 1985
40	Soft Landscape	A couple find themselves in trouble when they engage a strange pair of architects to build their dream house. Starring Saul Rubinek Written by Rachel Wyatt	November 11, 1985
41	The Nine Billion Names Of God	A computer programmer is hired by monks in Nepal to help them collect every possible name for the Almighty. A laughable project, with not so laughable consequences... Adaptation of Arthur C. Clarke's short story	November 18, 1985
42	Shoot The Unicorn	A photojournalist tracks down a lost Amazonian tribe. Written by Charles Tidler	November 25, 1985
43	The Language Of The Flowers	A keen gardener becomes obsessed with a strange, exotic orchid. Adaptation of Hugh Atkinson's novella	December 2, 1985
44	The Last 30 Days Of Charles L. Danforth	An accountant believes he and everyone around him are slowly turning into fish. Written by Clem Martini	December 9, 1985
45	Past Imperfect	An inventor's ruthless, self-seeking nephew turns the tables on him with the aid of his new time machine. But time is not something easily trifled with... Written by John Douglas	December 16, 1985
46	The Count's Wife	Giorgio's young wife Lucina starts to sprout wings. Adaptation of Dino Buzzati's short story, dramatized by Cindy Bisaillon	December 23, 1985
47	Children's Eyes	A visit to his aging parents sends a man into a downward spiral, obsessing over his father’s grotesque physical ailments. But what's real and what's in his mind? Written by Dennis Foon	December 30, 1985
48	Split Second	A woman returns home from a walk to find strangers living in her house, and no-one knows who she is. Adaptation of Daphne du Maurier's short story, dramatized by Desmond Scott	January 6, 1986
49	Mom's Home Cooking	A busload of senior citizens on a Canadian “mystery tour” get a whole lot more than they bargained for. Written by Kent Thompson	January 13, 1986
50	A Kissing Way	After-work drinks become a terrifying fight for survival when a young woman’s coworker turns out to be an unhinged psychopath. Written by Judith Thompson	January 20, 1986
51	The Man Who Liked Dickens	Imagine the great relief of Mr. Henry, to be rescued in remotest Amazonas from an ill-fated jungle expedition. And imagine the great delight of Mr. McMaster, his reclusive host, at finding someone to share the pleasures of his small but precious library... Adaptation of Evelyn Waugh's tale of jungle terror, dramatized by Alberto Manguel	January 27, 1986
52	Snow Shadow Area	The storm of the century and a series of child mutilations send an anxious father to the brink of madness. Written by Lawrence Russell	February 3, 1986
53	A Small, Good Thing	Adaptation of Raymond Carver's heartbreaking short story about a car accident and a forgotten birthday cake. Dramatized by Steve Petch	February 10, 1986
54	I'm A Stranger Here Myself	After giving birth, a new mother becomes convinced she is actually an alien. Written by Nika Rylski	February 17, 1986
55	Looking For A Quiet Place	Is Mary's problem noise, or Nick? Written by Rachel Wyatt	February 24, 1986
56	Azure Blue	A married couple's long-simmering hatred for one another boils over when an unexpected tragedy strikes. Is this exactly the change they've always needed? Written by Lawrence Jeffery	March 3, 1986
57	Antimony	Romance does not survive a woman's cryogenic freezing when she is revived in the future. Adaptation of Spider Robinson's story, dramatized by Kent Stetson	March 10, 1986
58	All The Way	An obsessive young actor walks the line between illusion and reality when he takes a leading role in a staged crime. Written by Bill Gray	March 17, 1986
59	A Silent Agreement	Like father, like son. Henry Worring wants only what's best for his son—so why does Tom insist on doing things his own way? And why, on the eve of Tom's visit home, does Henry feel so unaccountably apprehensive? An eerie original story. Written by Hans Böggild	March 24, 1986
60	The Ultimate Threshold	On the Planet Sym-Kri there stands the House of Death, built by a master mechanic named Velt. Now Velt himself stands before that final door to face the challenge of his own creation. A paradoxical story by Herman Maximov, an important writer of science fiction from the Soviet Republic of Kazakhstan. Dramatized by Seth Feldman	March 31, 1986
61	The Rising Of The North	Children's show 'What If?' examines the US President's radical plan to tackle his country's water shortage. Written by Michael Riordan	May 5, 1986
62	Death Of A Physicist	A physicist attempts to calculate the best way to join a loved one in the afterlife. Written by Christina Meeker & Peter Schultz	May 12, 1986
63	A Communicable Disease	An outbreak of a new, fatal disease seems to affect only yuppies. Written by Larry Fineberg	May 19, 1986
64	Closing Night	The director of a traveling theatre company encounters a strangely familiar ghost in a rundown hotel. Written by Warren Graves	May 26, 1986
65	The Right One	On his wedding day, a reluctant groom weighs his options. Written by Bryan Wade, who was then commissioned by the Blyth Festival of Ontario to expand it into a stage play in 1989.	June 2, 1986
66	The Doctor of the Soul	A renowned psychiatrist takes on a new patient and she's soon working her way under his skin... and into his dreams. Written by David Helwig	June 9, 1986
67	The Most Beautiful Woman in Town	A tobacco-stained writer finds himself consumed by the passion and chaos of a self-destructive street prostitute. Adaptation of Charles Bukowski's short story, dramatized by Ken Gass & Mina E. Mina and starring Mina.	June 16, 1986
68	Open Wide	An anxious man’s first trip to the dentist in years sets off a nightmarish chain of events. Recorded with "Kunstkopf binaural sound" for an immersive, stereo experience. Written by Paul Milliken	June 23, 1986
69	Certain Distant Suns	Hannah's aunt Bessie suffers the consequences when she loses her belief in just about everything. Written by Joanne Greenberg. Final episode of Vanishing Point's second season, they run a mix of reruns and Nightfall episodes over the summer.	June 30, 1986
XX	The African	The Black Persian #1: A fantastic mystery adventure set in 19th-century Africa. Written by Steve Petch. This episode begins Vanishing Point's third season, shifting the series towards serialized storytelling and short-run miniseries. It continues its twice-a-week broadcast schedule, sometimes premiering new episodes on Mondays (CBC Stereo), sometimes on Fridays (CBC-AM).	September 29, 1986
XX	Journey to the Interior	The Black Persian #2: Written by Steve Petch	October 6, 1986
XX	A Thousand Nights	The Black Persian #3: McRae awakens in the camp of the Tuareg women, the people of the veil… and discovers himself mistaken for one of the Persian Brotherhood of Assassins. Written by Steve Petch	October 13, 1986
XX	The Shifting Sands	The Black Persian #4: Written by Steve Petch	October 20, 1986
XX	The Dark Chamber	The Black Persian #5: Written by Steve Petch	October 27, 1986
XX	The Sacred Precinct	The Black Persian #6: McRae's quest takes him from a genteel English tour boat, to the majestic pyramids, to the bathhouses of Cairo, to an extraordinary, long-awaited meeting. Conclusion. Written by Steve Petch	November 3, 1986
XX	Radio Free Imagination	Fifty years in the future, radio has gone underground. The Crystal Creeps are secretly broadcasting treasures from the CBC Archives ... and the Media Monitors are after them. It is Freddy Bondhead's mission to infiltrate the enemy.... An offbeat celebration of 50 years of CBC broadcasting — and of the radio medium itself. Written by David Lewis Stein	November 10, 1986
XX	The Artist of the Beautiful	Thrice Told Tales #1: A series of dramas freely adapted from Nathaniel Hawthorne. From Haitian voodoo... to a nuclear-winter garden... to a microcomputer butterfly... to a bizarre gift bringing dubious good fortune... this eccentric mini-anthology imaginatively explores the radio medium and finds new-wave twists in some old-fashioned stories. In this installment, Owen Warland is a microelectronics genius famous for inventing the first commercially viable freestanding domestic robot. Unimpressed with his achievement, Owen rejects the practical world and its material rewards to pursue the making of his own private Frankenstein. Instead of a monster that's big and ugly, he attempts in the form of a miniature butterfly to create life that is small and beautiful: Adapted by Charles Tidler from Nathaniel Hawthorne's short story	November 17, 1986
XX	Never Marry a Spider	Thrice Told Tales #2: Did you hear the one about the man who left home one day, without a word to his wife, and turned up again 20 years later? Sure, it is easy to go out the back door of life - but watch that it does not slam shut. Adapted by Charles Tidler from Nathaniel Hawthorne's short story	November 24, 1986
XX	Rappaccini’s Daughter	Thrice Told Tales #3: After a lifetime's work helping her father breed plants which can withstand a nuclear winter, Professor Rappaccini's daughter has become toxic. Adapted by Charles Tidler from Nathaniel Hawthorne's short story	December 1, 1986
XX	The Headless Clown	Thrice Told Tales #4: An unemployed cobbler's luck turns when he comes into possession of a talking clown-head doll. Adapted by Charles Tidler from Nathaniel Hawthorne's short story	December 8, 1986
XX	Deep Desire	Thrice Told Tales #5: A television evangelist believes he is possessed by a demon snake. Adapted by Charles Tidler from Nathaniel Hawthorne's short story	December 15, 1986
XX	Strange Child	Thrice Told Tales #6: A science fiction writer's young daughter does not seem the same following an encounter with a UFO. Adapted by Charles Tidler from Nathaniel Hawthorne's short story	December 22, 1986
XX	Blood Music Part 1 of 3	A scientist injects himself with test-tube genes that give each of his blood cells the ability to think. As the cells multiply, societies develop within him and eventually escape to the outside world. The highly intelligent cells discover subatomic truths, thus acquiring the power of gods. Will they decide it is time to redo the world? Greg Bear's gripping science fiction novel adapted by Toronto playwright Clinton Bomphray	January 2, 1987
XX	Blood Music Part 2 of 3	Second of a three-part dramatization of Greg Bear's stunning work of speculative fiction concerning the creation of "intelligent cells" capable of taking over an entire body. Adapted by Clinton Bomphray	January 9, 1987
XX	Blood Music Part 3 of 3	Conclusion of a three-part dramatization of Greg Bear's novel, adapted by Clinton Bomphray	January 16, 1987
XX	A Few Words From Harold	Escape Routes #1: An eccentric collection of original stories by leading radio dramatist Rachel Wyatt. The thought of escape is appealing. We've all wanted to escape sometimes from aspects of life that are unpleasant or difficult or just plain dull. But for some people, escape takes unusual forms-with unexpected results. In this first installment — Harold was a nice guy: kind to his wife, honest in his business dealings, polite to people he disliked. In his spare time he enjoyed reading biographies of the great and not -so -great. But he could not help noticing that his own life lacked those vital elements of a good life: passion, striking coincidences, heroic moments, sudden wealth, startling revelations. Then Harold decided to change all that... Written by Rachel Wyatt	January 23, 1987
XX	Everything She Wants	Escape Routes #2: If you’ve ever seen one of those movie chase scenes where the runner keeps throwing blocks in the path of his pursuer, you’ll understand why Steve kept buying extravagant gifts for Lisa. It was his way of not having to say “I love you.” He may have gone a bit overboard… but can you fault a guy who tries to give his wife everything she wants? Written by Rachel Wyatt	January 30, 1987
XX	Looking for a Quiet Place	Escape Routes #3: Nick loved Mary. He also loved his stereo, his motorbike and all the wonderful noisy gadgetry that made up their life together. Mary was crazy about Nick—but she wanted a little peace and quiet. Was that too much to ask? Written by Rachel Wyatt	February 6, 1987
XX	Ultimate Destination	Escape Routes #4: Written by Rachel Wyatt	February 13, 1987
XX	Tango for Two Continents	This unique radio production explores Argentina, Bolivia, and Peru, delving into themes of music, drugs, and poverty while highlighting the beauty of a vanished civilization. Blurring the lines between dream, documentary, and fiction, this collaborative work draws inspiration from the experiences of lead actors John Jarvis and Graham Greene, along with director Paul Thompson, as they traveled through South America. They crafted the play together in the studio, using the collaborative approach of "collective creation" Thompson pioneered as the artistic director of Toronto's Theatre Passe Muraille in the 1970s.	February 16, 1987
XX	Strange Archaeology	Fingerprints #1: A series of original mysteries, dramatized from the 1984 Crime Writers of Canada story collection also titled Fingerprints. These cleverly crafted tales range in style from the comic to the philosophical, each as individual as a fingerprint. In this first installment, the death of a beautiful woman forces Lieutenant Boruvka to reopen a case he thought he’d solved 11 years ago. And the most meaningful clue comes from a crime five centuries old… Adaptation of Josef Skvorecky, dramatized by Paul Wilson	February 20, 1987
XX	A Natural Death	Fingerprints #2: Emily Forbes’ weekdays unfold in an unvarying routine. She breakfasts with the newspaper at eight, tidies from nine to eleven, then shops until her one o’clock lunch. Between lunch and tea she plans to murder her daughter-in-law… An ironic tale by the London, Ontario mystery writer and reviewer Sandra Woodruff, dramatized by Colleen Curran	February 27, 1987
XX	My Vacation from the Numbers Racket	Fingerprints #3: “Dear Benny: You’ll be surprised to hear that your father and I are in Sarasota. I meant to send you a postcard from Miami, but things just happened too fast. Right from the beginning, this winter we’ve spent in Florida…” This story by the creator of the acclaimed Benny Cooperman novels features Benny’s mother. Adaptation of Howard Engel's short story, dramatized by Ken Gass	March 6, 1987
XX	The Capitalist	Fingerprints #4: A cold November night. Not much action at the gas pumps, but Ryan and his Uncle Gordon have to mind the station anyway. No gloves, no hat, no car — Ryan has plenty to complain about. Maybe he’ll just teach that snotty welfare worker what it is like to have nothing… A crafty little story from British Columbia novelist Marion Crook, dramatized by Paul Milliken	March 13, 1987
XX	McGowney's Miracle	Fingerprints #5: Adapted from a story by Margaret Millar	March 20, 1987
XX	St. Anthony's Man	Fingerprints #6: Adapted from a story by Tim Wynne-Jones	March 27, 1987
XX	Mardi Gras	Third prize winner of the CBC Radio Literary Competition in the drama category. Written by Jim Christy	April 3, 1987
XX	Lucky Girl	Second prize winner of the CBC Radio Literary Competition in the drama category, Gordon Pengilly was inspired to write the play after spending time in rural Alberta's small-town country and western bars, which he referred to as "a dramatic goldmine." In 1989, Pengilly expanded it into a stage play at the Red Deer College Arts Theatre in Alberta, Canada, where it featured a live country band on the stage, playing songs written especially for the show. It also featured actors entering the set through a larger-than-life jukebox.	April 10, 1987
XX	Mortal	First prize winner of the CBC Radio Literary Competition in the drama category. With her father hospitalized and her relationship in critical condition, a woman is forced to make some impossible choices as we’re given a front row seat to her darkest thoughts. Written by Cordelia Strube	April 17, 1987
XX	The Truth About Pyecraft	The Menu is the Venue #1: A collection of dark stories about food. The first installment is an adaptation of H. G. Wells' humorous story about an obese man's extreme attempt at weight loss.	April 24, 1987
XX	Brownies	The Menu is the Venue #2: Friday night: Doreen’s old fashioned brownies, walnut-studded, thickly iced. Saturday, fresh pancakes with Lily’s famous blueberry syrup. Sunday, the all-you-can-eat buffet at the Royal Restaurant. Monday, hot chelsea buns… and this week, a special thrill in the mail: the long-awaited Treat of the Month. Mother and the girls enjoy a life of delicious routine — until Doreen perversely disrupts it. A contemporary gothic comedy by award-winning writer Linda Zwicker.	May 1, 1986
XX	Food for Thought	The Menu is the Venue #3: Tyler Crawford - one-time space prospector, daring drillship commander. Once he chased asteroids, gambling with his life; now he plays a different sort of odds, grounded in a prison of fat. Does that make him any less of a man? And how can that imprisoning wall of blubber really be his ticket to freedom? An original science fiction story with a twist. Written by Henry Mietkiewicz	May 8, 1987
XX	Curse of the Unnamed Planet	The Unnamed Planet Tetralogy #1: Mix sci-fi satire with pick-up bar banter and you’ve got The Unnamed Planet Tetralogy, an alien’s view of Earth. In this first installment, a drink to forget turns into a night to remember as Flanno recalls marooned Scout-Agent X-12’s horrific reports from primitive Unnamed Planet… the place of only two sexes! Starring Saul Rubinek. Written by Alfred Silver	May 15, 1987
XX	Return to the Unnamed Planet	The Unnamed Planet Tetralogy #2: An unauthorized rescue mission in a stolen space pod lands the bizarre quintet on the loathsome Unnamed Planet. Step one is transmogrification into the planet’s dominant species… but with a power-mad bardroid at the console controls, the results are near disastrous. Starring Saul Rubinek. Written by Alfred Silver	May 22, 1987
XX	Rescue on the Unnamed Planet	The Unnamed Planet Tetralogy #3: The bardroid’s inept transmogrification leads to further comic trouble on the Unnamed Planet. Then an accidental rescue turns into an unexpected reunion, as the Ecologizer appears on the scene. Starring Saul Rubinek. Written by Alfred Silver	May 29, 1987
XX	Revenge of the Unnamed Planet	The Unnamed Planet Tetralogy #4: The final installment. Starring Saul Rubinek. Written by Alfred Silver	June 5, 1987
XX	The Dispossessed Part 1 of 6	Shevek, the greatest scientist of the age, travels from his home planet of Anarres to the neighbouring planet of Urras. He is the first visitor from Anarres in two hundred years and suffers a profound culture shock on arrival. Unbeknown to Shevek, the authorities on Urras have an ulterior motive for inviting the great man. Based on the novel by Ursula K. Le Guin	June 12, 1987
XX	The Dispossessed Part 2 of 6	A flashback to his youth finds Shevek planting trees in the desert, as part of a work gang on his anarcho-syndicalist planet. Later, he attends the physics institute and finds that some citizens do not put the needs of society ahead of their own personal gain.	June 19, 1987
XX	The Dispossessed Part 3 of 6	Shevek attends a party and learns more about the class-based, sexist and capitalist society of Urras. He receives a note urging him to meet with the opposition anarchist underground.	June 26, 1987
XX	The Dispossessed Part 4 of 6	Following rebellion on the outer planets, Urras is in a state of emergency. Shevek is under pressure to complete his Theory of Simultaneity, which will allow faster than light travel and enable the government to crush the rebellion. In a flashback, we find Shevek and his family battling drought and famine on Anarres.	July 3, 1987
XX	The Dispossessed - Part 5 of 6	Escaping house arrest, Shevek joins the anarchist-socialist resistance in an uprising against the police state.	July 10, 1987
XX	The Dispossessed - Part 6 of 6	The uprising on Urras is viciously suppressed by the authorities. Shevek takes refuge in the Terran embassy, where he is assured of safe passage back to Anarres. He completes his Theory of Simultaneity and gives it away freely to all worlds, such that none will have an advantage over the others. Conclusion of The Dispossessed and Vanishing Point’s third season. It goes on hiatus, replaced by ZBS' The Adventures of Ruby.	July 17, 1987
XX	Alligators in the Lake	A low-rent P.I. opens his door to the wrong client and soon finds himself sucked deep into the delusional swamp of a wealthy dermatologist and his paranoid wife. Written by Sally Clark	October 19, 1987
XX	Journey to a Secret Sea	The discovery of an underground ocean sends a pair of oceanographers trekking into the darkest corners of the earth... and their own souls. Written by Geoffrey Ursell	October 26, 1987
XX	Hair of the Dog	When a radio director makes the mistake of declaring war on the station’s veteran sound effects man, she soon discovers he has more in his arsenal than rusty hinges and coconut shells. Written by J.J. McColl	November 23, 1987
XX	The Rawhide Hour	Meet Roy Boy Long, a radio DJ and former rodeo clown who's always quick on the draw with a tall tale or a wild sound effect in Gordon Pengilly’s spiritual sequel to his radio play "Lucky Girl" which played on Vanishing Point in April, 1987.	November 30, 1987
XX	Freefall	Runner up in the CBC Literary Competition. A sensual drama about a love triangle by Louise Young	December 7, 1987
XX	Faceoff	Runner up in the CBC Literary Competition. Written by Carol Shields	December 14, 1987
XX	Fleshtone	Runner up in the CBC Literary Competition. A series of unexplained supernovae cause an astronomer to rethink his views on religion in this surprisingly sweet Christmas episode. Written by Bill Van Luven	December 21, 1987
XX	Mr. Grendelton Crashes A Party	An alien from another dimension gatecrashes a party in an attempt to find his way home. Written by Tim Wynne-Jones	December 28, 1987
XX	Rosa	The Valley of the Shadow #1: A Trilogy by Audrey Thomas	January 4, 1988
XX	Mr. Johnson	The Valley of the Shadow #2: Written by Audrey Thomas	January 11, 1988
XX	Illusions	The Valley of the Shadow #3: Written by Audrey Thomas	January 18, 1988
XX	A Small, Good Thing	Three By Carver #1: Adaptation of Raymond Carver's short story that originally ran on Vanishing Point in February of 1986	January 22, 1988
XX	Vitamins	Three By Carver #2: Adaptation of Raymond Carver's short story	February 1, 1988
XX	Cathedral	Three By Carver #3: Adaptation of Raymond Carver's short story	February 8, 1988
XX	The Smyth-Joneses	A comedy set in Lower Westmount and produced in Montreal. Written by Colleen Curran	February 15, 1988
XX	The Man Who Thought Ian Tyson Was God	Written by Alfred Silver	February 29, 1988
XX	The Word for World is Forest Part 1 of 3	Adaptation of the novella by Ursula K. Le Guin	March 18, 1988
XX	The Word for World is Forest Part 2 of 3	Adaptation of the novella by Ursula K. Le Guin	March 25, 1988
XX	Train to Montreal	A very original poem for radio. Written by Dionne Brand	March 28, 1988
XX	The Word for World is Forest Part 3 of 3	Adaptation of the novella by Ursula K. Le Guin	April 1, 1988
XX	Dancing	Written by Neil Bissoondath	April 4, 1988
XX	Drifter	Written by David Widdicombe	April 15, 1988
XX	Earth Culture	The Nightmare continues in this "pocket musical" written by Keith McNair	April 18, 1988
XX	Dirty Hands	Written by Michael Riordan	April 22, 1988
XX	The Rat Agenda	Written by Michael Riordan	April 29, 1988
XX	Can You Hear Me?	Written by Michael Riordan	May 6, 1988
XX	Rubber Ball	A whimsical fable about a poet who goes over Niagara Falls in a rubber ball. Adaptation of Victor-Lévy Beaulieu's story, dramatized by Dave Carley	May 13, 1988
XX	Somebody Talking to You	A media consultant chases down "addictive cassettes" that somehow hook the listener then make them disappear completely. All that's left of them? A voice on a cassette. Written by Jeff Green and originally released as part of his Soundings Canadian radio drama series	May 16, 1988
XX	Restoration	An original story set in Kampuchea. Written by Frank Moher	May 20, 1988
XX	Scar Tissue	Written by Cordelia Strube	May 27, 1988
XX	The Baby	Written by Ian Weir	June 3, 1988
XX	Daddy	Story of a man who suddenly develops amnesia. Written by Vassilis Alexakis	June 10, 1988
XX	The Sight	A man’s housekeeper knows things about him that he does not know himself. Written by Brian Moore	June 17, 1988
XX	The Unknown Soldier	An unusual Vietnam War story. Written by David Widdicombe	June 20, 1988
XX	Speechless	Written by David Swick	June 24, 1988
XX	When the Bough Breaks	Written by Paul Milliken	June 27, 1988
XX	Story of King Kong	An international, multi-lingual sound extravaganza produced by RAI—Italian Public Radio. Final episode of Vanishing Point’s fourth season. ZBS' Dreams of Rio from Thomas Lopez runs as the summer replacement	July 7, 1988
XX	The African	The Black Persian #1: An early return for season five of Vanishing Point with a rerun of Steve Petch’s 6-episode serial set in 19th-century Africa. Only this time it is followed by 6 new episodes. Written by Steve Petch	August 12, 1988
XX	Journey to the Interior	The Black Persian #2: Repeat	August 19, 1988
XX	A Thousand Nights	The Black Persian #3: Repeat	August 26, 1988
XX	The Shifting Sands	The Black Persian #4: Repeat	September 2, 1988
XX	The Sacred Precinct	The Black Persian #5: Repeat	September 15, 1988
XX	The Dark Chamber	The Black Persian #6: Repeat	October 3, 1988
XX	The Deceivers	The Black Persian #7: New episodes begin. Written by Steve Petch	October 10, 1988
XX	The Road	The Black Persian #8: Written by Steve Petch	October 17, 1988
XX	The Goddess	The Black Persian #9: Written by Steve Petch	October 24, 1988
XX	Sanctuary	The Black Persian #10: Written by Steve Petch	October 31, 1988
XX	Dark Waters	The Black Persian #11: Written by Steve Petch	November 7, 1988
XX	Escapement	The Stories of J. G. Ballard #1: A man becomes trapped in a time loop. Based on the short story by J. G. Ballard	November 14, 1988
XX	The Man Who Collected Women	New Alberta Voices #1: Series featuring winners of the second annual Write for Radio competition sponsored by the CBC and the Alberta Department of Culture and Multiculturalism. Written by Rose Scollard, she won first prize for this play. Vanishing Point has begun running on Sundays (CBC-AM) and Mondays (CBC Stereo) rather than Fridays and Mondays.	November 20, 1988
XX	Dead Astronaut	The Stories of J. G. Ballard #2	November 21, 1988
XX	King Of Another Place	New Alberta Voices #2: A mentally ill man believes he can save the world from disaster. Written by Brad Fraser & Geoffrey Hershfield	November 27, 1988
XX	The Cloud Sculptors of Coral D	The Stories of J. G. Ballard #3: A group of artistic pilots carve cloud sculptures with gliders. Based on the short story by J. G. Ballard	November 28, 1988
XX	The Dinosaur Connection	New Alberta Voices #3: On a post-apocalyptic Earth, a technician on an expedition from a domed city meets 'outlanders' for the first time. Written by Cecilia Fry	December 4, 1988
XX	Low Flying Aircraft	The Stories of J. G. Ballard #4: In a world in which the population has fallen dramatically as more and more babies are born deformed, Forrester and his wife Judith await news of her latest pregnancy. Based on the short story by J. G. Ballard	December 5, 1988
XX	A Question of Re-entry	The Stories of J. G. Ballard #5: An investigator, searching for a missing astronaut in the Amazon Jungle, gets caught up in a power struggle between a missionary, who has gone native, and a witch doctor's son. Based on the short story by J. G. Ballard	December 12, 1988
XX	News From The Sun	The Stories of J. G. Ballard #6: In a near future world, a mysterious mental plague causes people to enter fugue states for increasing lengths of time. Based on the short story by J. G. Ballard	December 19, 1988
XX	Having A Wonderful Time	The Stories of J. G. Ballard #7: A couple's luxury holiday in the Canary Islands just seems to go on and on and on… Based on the short story by J. G. Ballard	December 26, 1988
XX	The Best Show on Television	Fables of the Near Future #1: Written by David Widdicombe	January 2, 1989
XX	Project: Gemini	Fables of the Near Future #2: An experimental program pairs up elderly people as housemates. Written by Paul Milliken	January 9, 1989
XX	Marooned	Fables of the Near Future #3: Shopping malls are getting bigger and better all the time. Once you're inside, you might never want to leave... Written by Steven Freygood	January 16, 1989
XX	Satan's Children	Fables of the Near Future #4: Adaptation of Spider Robinson’s short story	January 23, 1989
XX	Harvest of the Sun	Fables of the Near Future #5: A futuristic story set on the Prairies of 1999 as the last holdout farmer struggles to survive. Written by Barbara Sapergia	January 30, 1989
XX	Of Machines and Men	Fables of the Near Future #6: Written by David Widdicombe	February 6, 1989
XX	The Chosen	Fables of the Near Future #7: Written by Rose Scollard	February 13, 1989
XX	Vanishing Child	Fables of the Near Future #8: Written by Raymond Storey	February 20, 1989
XX	Jade Spirit	Fables of the Near Future #9:Written by Susan Mayse	March 12, 1989
XX	Marriage Guidance	The Doctor's Casebook #1: A wildly comic exposé of medicine on the run, starring Steven Bush as a doctor who just can not rest on his laurels. Written by Rachel Wyatt	April 17, 1989
XX	Empty Waiting Room	The Doctor's Casebook #2: Written by Rachel Wyatt	April 24, 1989
XX	A Healthy Way to Die	The Doctor's Casebook #3: Written by Rachel Wyatt	May 1, 1989
XX	Nothing Like Sea Air	The Doctor's Casebook #4: Written by Rachel Wyatt	May 8, 1989
XX	A Case in Point	The Doctor's Casebook #5: Written by Rachel Wyatt	May 15, 1989
XX	A Way With Children	The Doctor's Casebook #6: Written by Rachel Wyatt	May 22, 1989
XX	Marco	Pocket Musicals #1: First of a two-part portrait of Marco Solares, legendary singer/songwriter turned revolutionary. Written by Ken Gass with music by John Mills-Cockell	May 29, 1989
XX	Marco Part 2	Pocket Musicals #2: Conclusion of a two-part portrait of Marco Solares, legendary singer/songwriter turned revolutionary. Written by Ken Gass with music by John Mills-Cockell	June 5, 1989
XX	The Curve of Heaven	Pocket Musicals #3: Written by Larry Fineberg	June 12, 1989
XX	The Ballad of an Existential Cowboy	Pocket Musicals #4: Selected by the CBC as one of its Best-of-Decade. Written by Gordon Pengilly with music by Ron Casat	June 19, 1989
XX	The Man Who Went Home Again	Time Again #1: Written by Charles Tidler	September 11, 1989
XX	The Ravine	Time Again #2: Written by David Bolt	September 18, 1989
XX	Sightseeing	Time Again #3: Adaptation of David Bolt’s short story, dramatized by Nika Rylski	September 25, 1989
XX	Past Due	Time Again #4: Written by Cordelia Strube	October 2, 1989
XX	Train	Journeys #1: Written by Lawrence Russell	October 9, 1989
XX	Flight	Journeys #2: Written by James Dunnison	October 16, 1989
XX	Lisdoonvarna	Journeys #3: Written by Colleen Curran	October 23, 1989
XX	The South	Journeys #4: Adaptation of Jorge Luis Borges's short story, dramatized by Alberto Manguel	October 30, 1989
XX	On the Beach	Journeys #5: Written by Cordelia Strube	November 6, 1989
XX	Song of the Mahgreb	Journeys #6: Written by Lawrence Russell	November 13, 1989
XX	Childhood's End Part 1 of 5	Adaptation of Arthur C. Clarke's novel, dramatized by David Lewis Stein	November 20, 1989
XX	Childhood's End Part 2 of 5	Adaptation of Arthur C. Clarke's novel, dramatized by David Lewis Stein	November 27, 1989
XX	Childhood's End Part 3 of 5	Adaptation of Arthur C. Clarke's novel, dramatized by David Lewis Stein	December 4, 1989
XX	Childhood's End Part 4 of 5	Adaptation of Arthur C. Clarke's novel, dramatized by David Lewis Stein	December 11, 1989
XX	Childhood's End Part 5 of 5	Adaptation of Arthur C. Clarke's novel, dramatized by David Lewis Stein	December 18, 1989
XX	Babysitter	Urban Legends #1: Written by J. J. McColl	January 1, 1990
XX	Whiteout	Urban Legends #2: The tale of a mysterious hitchhiker. Written by David Bolt	January 8, 1990
XX	The Pet	Urban Legends #3: Written by David Widdicombe	January 15, 1990
XX	Turns for the Worst	Urban Legends #4: Written by Sherman Snukal	January 22, 1990
XX	11:52	Urban Legends #5: Written by Bill Van Luven	January 29, 1990
XX	Monster in the Sewer	Urban Legends #6: Written by David Widdicombe	February 5, 1990
XX	Kiss the Bride Goodbye	Urban Legends #7: Written by Colleen Curran	February 12, 1990
XX	Trespassing	Urban Legends #8: Written by Patricia Ludwick	February 19, 1990
XX	Island at Noon	The Stories of Julio Cortázar #1: Adaptation of Julio Cortázar's short story, dramatized by Alberto Manguel	February 26, 1990
XX	Instructions For John Howell	The Stories of Julio Cortázar #2: Adaptation of Julio Cortázar's short story, dramatized by Alberto Manguel	March 5, 1990
XX	After Lunch	The Stories of Julio Cortázar #3: Adaptation of Julio Cortázar's short story, dramatized by Alberto Manguel	March 12, 1990
XX	Southern Thruway	The Stories of Julio Cortázar #4: Adaptation of Julio Cortázar's short story, dramatized by Alberto Manguel	March 19, 1990
XX	Summer	The Stories of Julio Cortázar #5: Adaptation of Julio Cortázar's short story, dramatized by Alberto Manguel	March 26, 1990
XX	Press Clippings	The Stories of Julio Cortázar #6: Adaptation of Julio Cortázar's short story, dramatized by Alberto Manguel	April 2, 1990
XX	Blowup	The Stories of Julio Cortázar #7: Adaptation of Julio Cortázar's short story, dramatized by Alberto Manguel	April 9, 1990
XX	Timbuktu	Getting There #1: Written by Audrey Thomas	April 16, 1990
XX	And the Ship Sailed On	Getting There #2: Written by Audrey Thomas	April 23, 1990
XX	People in Glass Houses	Getting There #3: Written by Audrey Thomas	April 30, 1990
XX	Sleep Enders	New Alberta Voices #1: The script for this and the next two episodes were selected as winners of the third annual Write-for-Radio competition. Of the 109 entries submitted, the top three scripts were selected by judges including William Lane, Vanishing Point's executive producer; Bill Law, features producer for CBC radio in Edmonton; Ruth Bertelsen Fraser, director of Alberta Culture and Multiculturalism's film and literary arts branch; and Martie Fishman, CBC Calgary drama producer. Each prize winner received $500 and the opportunity to participate in a five-day pre-production workshop. Written by Calgary writer Fran Kimmel	May 7, 1990
XX	Meeting with Mr. Skunk	New Alberta Voices #2: Written by Edmonton writer James Galbraith	May 14, 1990
XX	Honey Cat	New Alberta Voices #3: Written by Edmonton writer Mary Walters Riskin. Final episode of Vanishing Point’s fifth season. The series goes on hiatus for a 14-week run of The Best of Vanishing Point	May 21, 1990
XX	Marriage Guidance	The Doctor's Casebook #1: Written by Rachel Wyatt. Vanishing Point opens its sixth season with reruns of two miniseries — The Doctor’s Casebook and The Black Persian — running simultaneously on two different days of the week. Both series also include new episodes building off the initial run.	September 2, 1990
XX	The African	The Black Persian #1: Repeat	September 3, 1990
XX	Empty Waiting Room	The Doctor's Casebook #2: Repeat	September 9, 1990
XX	Journey to the Interior	The Black Persian #2: Repeat	September 10, 1990
XX	A Healthy Way to Die	The Doctor's Casebook #3: Repeat	September 16, 1990
XX	A Thousand Nights	The Black Persian #3: Repeat	September 17, 1990
XX	Nothing Like Sea Air	The Doctor's Casebook #4: Repeat	September 23, 1990
XX	The Shifting Sands	The Black Persian #4: Repeat	September 24, 1990
XX	A Case in Point	The Doctor's Casebook #5: Repeat	September 30, 1990
XX	The Sacred Precinct	The Black Persian #5: Repeat	October 1, 1990
XX	A Way With Children	The Doctor's Casebook #6: Repeat	October 7, 1990
XX	The Dark Chamber	The Black Persian #6: Repeat	October 8, 1990
XX	Health Service	The Doctor's Casebook #7: New episodes begin. Written by Rachel Wyatt	October 14, 1990
XX	The Deceivers	The Black Persian #7: Repeat	October 15, 1990
XX	Charity Begins	The Doctor's Casebook #8: Written by Rachel Wyatt	October 21, 1990
XX	The Road	The Black Persian #8: Repeat	October 22, 1990
XX	Paradise	The Doctor's Casebook #9: Written by Rachel Wyatt. Final episode of current run of The Doctor’s Casebook as Vanishing Point switches back to a once-a-week format. Doctor’s Casebook will return in 1991.	October 28, 1990
XX	The Goddess	The Black Persian #9: Repeat	November 5, 1990
XX	Sanctuary	The Black Persian #10: Repeat	November 12, 1990
XX	Dark Waters	The Black Persian #11: Repeat	November 19, 1990
XX	Under the Waves	The Black Persian #12: New episodes begin. Written by Steve Petch	November 26, 1990
XX	The Island	The Black Persian #13: Written by Steve Petch	December 3, 1990
XX	The Living Dead	The Black Persian #14: Written by Steve Petch	December 10, 1990
XX	On Becoming a Widow	New Manitoba Voices: Written by Bill Harrar	January 7, 1991
XX	The Last Chance Saloon	New Manitoba Voices: Written by Craig Dix	January 14, 1991
XX	The Elysian Fields	New Manitoba Voices: Written by Ruth Andrishak and Nancy McKinnon	January 21, 1991
XX	Last of the Great Rock Legends	Written by David Widdicombe	July 15, 1991
XX	Oh, for the Love of an Intelligent Building	Fables of the Near Future: Written by James Waller	August 5, 1991
XX	Stepping Onto the Future	Fables of the Near Future: Written by Jean Yoon	August 12, 1991
XX	The Last Mailman	Fables of the Near Future: Written by Paul Milliken	August 26, 1991
XX	Espresso	Fables of the Near Future: Written by Catherine Girczyc	September 2, 1991
XX	Hide and Seek	Fables of the Near Future: Written by C. Davidson and S. Brown	September 9, 1991
XX	Love on a Colder Planet Part 1	Written by Jeff Rosen	September 23, 1991
XX	Love on a Colder Planet Part 2	Written by Jeff Rosen	September 30, 1991
XX	Love on a Colder Planet Part 3	Written by Jeff Rosen. Vanishing Point switches back to Friday nights on CBC-AM.	October 11, 1991
XX	The Woman Who Loved Pumpkins	The Doctor's Casebook: Written by Rachel Wyatt	October 18, 1991
XX	That Family Feeling	The Doctor's Casebook: Written by Rachel Wyatt	October 25, 1991
XX	To Sea in a Pea-Green Boat	The Doctor's Casebook: Written by Rachel Wyatt	November 1, 1991
XX	The Man Who Dreamed in Djemma el Fna	In the Dream Time #1: Plays about dreams and dreaming. In this installment, a young man dreams of losing himself in the “real” Morocco, but the dream comes frighteningly true when he reaches Djemma el Fna — the “assembly of the dead.” Written by Steve Petch	November 8, 1991
XX	Feast of the Dead	In the Dream Time #2: The story of an Indian man who rejects his past until he takes a journey out of the city. Written by Daniel David Moses	November 15, 1991
XX	Final Exam	In the Dream Time #3: Written by Wes Schreiber	November 22, 1991
XX	The Shout	In the Dream Time #4: Adaptation of Robert Graves' short story	November 29, 1991
XX	The Bear	In the Dream Time #5: Written by Rita Moir	December 6, 1991
XX	A Dream Within	In the Dream Time #6: Written by James R. Wallen	December 13, 1991
XX	Dream a Little Dream of Me	In the Dream Time #7: Written by David Widdicombe	December 20, 1991
XX	Between the Seconds	In the Dream Time #8: A fascinating story about a woman who “slips between the cracks of time” when the second-hand stops on the operating room clock. Written by Patricia Ludwick	December 27, 1991
XX	Digging to Demeter	In the Dream Time #9: A woman’s dig on a Greek island unexpectedly unearths memories of a dead daughter and starts the woman on a voyage of recovery paralleling that of Demeter. Written by Patricia Bradbury. Final episode of the series.	January 3, 1992
XX	Fanta Film	An international, multi-lingual production from RAI—Italian Public Radio	Date Unknown
