= Blyth Festival production history =

Chronological list of stage productions at Blyth Festival in Ontario

Blyth Festival, located in Blyth, Ontario, Canada, specializes in the production and promotion of Canadian plays. The following is a chronological list of the productions that have been staged as part of the Festival since its inception. World Premieres have also been noted.

== 1975 ==
- The Mousetrap - by Agatha Christie
- Mostly in Clover (World Premiere)- by Harry J. Boyle

== 1976 ==
- The Blood Is Strong (World Premiere)- by Lister Sinclair
- How I Met My Husband (World Premiere)- by Alice Munro
- Mostly in Clover - by Harry J. Boyle
- Shape(World Premiere) - by Jim Schaefer

== 1977 ==
- A Summer Burning(World Premiere) - by Anne Chislett from the novel by Harry J. Boyle
- The Blood Is Strong - by Lister Sinclair
- The Blyth Memorial History Show (World Premiere)- by Jim Schaefer
- The Shortest Distance Between Two Points (World Premiere) - by Keith Roulston

== 1978 ==
- The Huron Tiger(World Premiere) - by Peter Colley
- His Own Boss (World Premiere) - by Keith Roulston
- The School Show(World Premiere) - by Ted Johns
- Gwendoline (World Premiere)- by James W. Nichol
- Two Miles Off - by the Theatre Network

== 1979 ==
- This Foreign Land (World Premiere) - by Patricia Mahoney
- I'll Be Back For You Before Midnight (World Premiere)- by Peter Colley
- McGillicuddy's Lost Weekend (World Premiere)- by Keith Roulston
- Child (World Premiere)- by James W. Nichol
- The Death of the Donnellys - by Theatre Passe Muraille and Ted Johns

== 1980 ==
- John and the Missus - by Gordon Pinsent
- St. Sam of the Nuke Pile(World Premiere) - by Ted Johns
- i'll be back for you before midnight - by Peter Colley
- The Life That Jack Built (World Premiere)- by David Fox and Janet Amos

== 1981 ==
- He Won't Come In From The Barn - by Ted Johns
- Quiet In The Land(World Premiere) - by Anne Chislett
- Love or Money (World Premiere) - by Carol Bolt
- The Tomorrow Box - by Anne Chislett
- Fire On Ice (World Premiere)- by Keith Roulston

== 1982 ==
- Down North(World Premiere) - by Janet Amos
- Heads You Lose(World Premiere) - by Peter Colley
- La Sagouine - by Antonine Maillet
- Country Hearts(World Premiere) - by Ted Johns and John Roby
- Quiet In The Land - by Anne Chislett

== 1983 ==
- Nobody's Child (World Premiere)- by Janice Wiseman and Holden Jones
- My Wild Irish Rose (World Premiere)- by Janet Amos
- Tighten The Traces, Haul In The Reins - by Robbie O'Neill
- Naked On The North Shore - by Ted Johns
- The Innocent And The Just - by Gratien Gélinas
- The Tomorrow Box - by Anne Chislett

== 1984 ==
- Garrison's Garage(World Premiere) - by Ted Johns
- A Spider In The House(World Premiere) - by Brian Tremlay
- Cake-Walk(World Premiere) - by Colleen Curran
- Blue City Slammers (World Premiere) - by Layne Coleman
- Country Hearts - by Ted Johns and John Roby

== 1985 ==
- Polderland(World Premiere) - by Brian Wade
- Moose County (World Premiere)- by Colleen Curran
- Beaux Gestes and Beautiful Deeds - by Marie-Lynn Hammond
- Primrose School District 109 (World Premiere)- by Ted Galay
- Garrison's Garage - by Ted Johns

== 1986 ==
- Another Season's Promise (World Premiere) - by Anne Chislett and Keith Roulston
- Drift - by Rex Deverell
- Gone To Glory (World Premiere)- by Suzanne Finlay
- Lilly, Alta. (World Premiere)- by Kenneth Dybat
- Cake-Walk - by Colleen Curran

== 1987 ==
- Girls In The Gang (World Premiere) - by John Roby and Raymond Storey
- Miss Balmoral of the Bayview (World Premiere)- by Colleen Curran
- Bush Fire (World Premiere) - by Laurie Fyffe
- Another Season's Promise - by Anne Chislett and Keith Roulston
- Bordertown Café (World Premiere) - by Kelly Rebar

== 1988 ==
- The Cookie War (World Premiere)- by Kathleen McDonnell
- The Mail Order Bride - by Robert Clinton
- Lucien - by Marshall Button
- Fires In The Night (World Premiere)- by David S. Craig
- Bordertown Café - by Kelly Rebar

== 1989 ==
- Perils of Persephone (World Premiere)- by Dan Needles
- Sticks and Stones (part 1) by James Reaney
- The Right One (World Premiere) - by Bryan Wade
- The Dreamland (World Premiere) - by Raymond Storey and John Roby
- The Mail Order Bride - by Robert Clinton

== 1990 ==
- Local Talent (World Premiere) - by Collen Curran
- Albertine in Five Times - by Michel Tremblay
- A Field of Flowers (World Premiere) - by Laurie Fyffe
- The Perils of Persephone - by Dan Needles
- Firefly (World Premiere) - by Carol Sinclair with music by John Alcorn

== 1991 ==
- Two Brothers (World Premiere) - by Ted Johns
- Barbershop Quartet (World Premiere) - by Layne Coleman
- The Stone Angel - by James W. Nichol based on the novel by Margaret Laurence
- End Of The World Romance (World Premiere)- by Sean Dixon
- Cornflower Blue (World Premiere) - by Kelly Rebar

== 1992 ==
- The Puff 'n' Blow Boys - by Valoreyne Brandt Jenkins
- The Hometown Boy (World Premiere)- by Robert Clinton
- Back Up and Push - or The Confessions of a Reformed Cynic (World Premiere) - by Ted Johns
- The Glorious 12th (World Premiere)- by Raymond Storey
- Yankee Notions (World Premiere)- by Anne Chislett
- I'll Be Back Before Midnight - by Peter Colley

== 1993 ==
- Many Hands (World Premiere) - by Dale Hamilton
- Ceili House (World Premiere)- by Colleen Curran
- Safe Haven (World Premiere)- by Mary-Colin Chisholm
- The Old Man's Band (World Premiere) - by John Roby
- Web (World Premiere)- by Rosalind Goldsmith
- The Glorious 12th - by Raymond Storey

== 1994 ==
- Glengarry School Days (World Premiere) - by Anne Chislett
- He Won't Come In From The Barn - by Ted Johns
- The Black Bonspiel of Wullie MacCrimmon - by W.O. Mitchell
- Bouncing Back (World Premiere)- by Suzanne Finlay

== 1995 ==
- Ballad for a Rum Runner's Daughter (World Premiere)- book & lyrics by Laurie Fyffe and music by Beth Barley
- This Year, Next Year (World Premiere)- by Norah Harding
- The Tomorrow Box - by Anne Chislett
- Jake's Place (World Premiere) - by Ted Johns
- He Won't Come In From The Barn - by Ted Johns

== 1996 ==
- Barndance, Live! (World Premiere)- by Paul Thompson
- Ma Belle Mabel - by Cindy Cowan
- Villa Eden (World Premiere) - by Colleen Curran
- Fireworks (World Premiere)- by Gordon Portman

== 1997 ==
- Quiet in the Land - by Anne Chislett
- Booze Days in a Dry County (World Premiere)directed by Paul Thompson
- There's Nothing In The Paper (World Premiere) - by David Scott
- The Melville Boys - by Norm Foster
- Barndance, Live! - by Paul Thompson
- Overboard! (World Premiere) - by Deborah Kimmett

== 1998 ==
- Yesteryear - by Joanna McClelland Glass
- Wilbur County Blues (World Premiere)- by Andrew Moodie
- Thirteen Hands - by Carol Shields
- Jobs, Jobs, Jobs (World Premiere) - by Keith Roulston
- Hot Flashes (World Premiere) - by Paul Ledoux and John Roby

== 1999 ==
- That Summer (World Premiere) - by David French
- Big Box (World Premiere) - by David Carley
- The Great School Crisis of '99 (World Premiere) - by Ted Johns
- Every Dream (World Premiere) - by James W. Nichol
- When the Reaper Calls - by Peter Colley

== 2000 ==
- Death of the Hired Man (World Premiere)- by Paul Thompson
- Anne adapted for the stage by Paul Ledoux
- Corker - by Wendy Lill
- The Drawer Boy - by Michael Healey
- Stolen Lives - the Albert Walker Story (World Premiere) - by Peter Colley
- When the Reaper Calls - by Peter Colley

== 2001 ==
- The Outdoor Donnellys (World Premiere) - by Paul Thompson and Janet Amos
- The Passion of Narcisse Mondoux - by Gratien Gelinas
- Cruel Tears - by Ken Mitchell and Humphrey & the Dumptrucks
- McGillicuddy (World Premiere) - by Keith Roulston
- Sometime, Never (World Premiere) - by Norah Harding
- Corner Green (World Premiere) - by Gordon Pinsent

== 2002 ==
- The Outdoor Donnellys - by Paul Thompson and Janet Amos
- Goodbye, Piccadilly (World Premiere) - by Douglas Bowie
- Filthy Rich - by George F. Walker
- The Drawer Boy - by Michael Healey
- Barnboozled: He Won't Come In From the Barn, part II (World Premiere) - by Ted Johns

== 2003 ==
- The Perilous Pirate's Daughter (World Premiere) - by Anne Chislett & David Archibald
- Leaving Home - by David French
- Hippie (World Premiere) - by Jonathan Garfinkel, Kelly McIntosh and Paul Thompson
- Having Hope at Home (World Premiere) - by David S. Craig
- Barnboozled: He Won't Come In From the Barn, part II - by Ted Johns

== 2004 ==
- The Outdoor Donnellys - by Paul Thompson and Janet Amos
- Heat Wave - by Michel Marc Bouchard
- Salt-Water Moon - by David French
- Spirit of the Narrows (World Premiere) - by Anne Lederman
- Cricket & Claudette (World Premiere) - by Ted Johns
- Test Drive (World Premiere) - by Dave Carley

== 2005 ==
- The Ginkgo Tree - by Lee MacDougall
- Powers and Gloria (World Premiere) - by Keith Roulston
- The Thirteenth One (World Premiere) - by Denyse Gervais Regan
- I'll be back before midnight - by Peter Colley
- Spirit of the Narrows - by Anne Lederman

== 2006 ==
- Ballad of Stompin' Tom (World Premiere) - by David Scott, songs by Stompin' Tom Connors
- Lost Heir (World Premiere) - by Sean Dixon
- Another Season's Harvest (World Premiere) - by Anne Chislett & Keith Roulston
- Schoolhouse (World Premiere) - by Leanna Brodie

== 2007 ==
- The Eyes of Heaven (World Premiere) - by Beverley Cooper
- Queen Milli of Galt - by Gary Kirkham
- World Without Shadows - by Lance Woolaver
- Reverend Jonah (World Premiere) - by Paul Ciufo
- Ballad of Stompin' Tom - by David Scott, songs by Stompin' Tom Connors

== 2008 ==
- Against the Grain (World Premiere) - by Carolyn Hay
- Harvest (World Premiere) - by Ken Cameron
- Courting Johanna (World Premiere) - by Marcia Johnson, based on Hateship, Friendship, Courtship, Loveship, Marriage by Alice Munro
- The Steven Truscott Project - by Beverley Cooper

== 2009 ==
- The Bootblack Orator (World Premiere) by Ted Johns
- The Mail Order Bride by Robert Clinton
- Hockey Mom, Hockey Dad by Michael Melski
- The Nuttalls (World Premiere) by Michael Healey
- Innocence Lost: A Play About Steven Truscott (World Premiere) by Beverley Cooper

== 2010 ==
- A Killing Snow (World Premiere) by Paul Ciufo
- Bordertown Cafe by Kelly Rebar
- Pearl Gidley (World Premiere) by Gary Kirkham
- The Book of Esther (World Premiere) by Leanna Brodie

== 2011 ==
- Hometown (World Premiere) by Jean Marc Dalpe, Mieko Ouchi, Mansel Robinson, Martha Ross, Peter Smith & Des Walsh
- Vimy by Vern Thiessen
- Rope's End by Douglas Bowie
- Early August (World Premiere) by Kate Lynch

== 2012 ==
- Dear Johnny Deere (World Premiere) by Ken Cameron, Based on the songs of Fred Eaglesmith
- Having Hope at Home by David S. Craig
- The Lonely Diner: Al Capone in Euphemia Township (World Premiere) by Beverley Cooper
- The Devil We Know (World Premiere) by Cheryl Foggo and Clem Martini

== 2013 ==
- Dear Johnny Deere by Ken Cameron, Based on the songs of Fred Eaglesmith
- Beyond the Farm Show (World Premiere) by The Collective
- Yorkville - The Musical (World Premiere) Book and Lyrics by Carolyn Hay; Music by Tom Szczesniak
- Garrison's Garage by Ted Johns
- Prairie Nurse (World Premiere) by Marie Beath Badian
- Falling: A Wake by Gary Kirkham

== 2014 ==
- Kitchen Radio (World Premiere) Book by Marion de Vries; Music & Lyrics by Marion de Vries and David Archibald
- Billy Bishop Goes to War Written and composed by John MacLachlan Gray in collaboration with Eric Peterson
- Stag and Doe (World Premiere) by Mark Crawford
- St. Anne's Reel (World Premiere) by Gil Garratt

== 2015 ==
- Seeds - Annabel Soutar
- Wilberforce Hotel (World Premiere) - Sean Dixon
- Fury (World Premiere) - Book and Lyrics by Peter Smith; Music by Samuel Shouldice
- Mary's Wedding - Stephen Massicotte

== 2016 ==
- Our Beautiful Sons: Remembering Matthew Dinning (World Premiere) Christopher Morris
- The Birds and the Bees (World Premiere) Mark Crawford
- If Truth Be Told (World Premiere) Beverley Cooper
- The Last Donnelly Standing (World Premiere) Paul Thompson and Gil Garratt

== 2017 ==
- Mr. New Year's Eve: A night with Guy Lombardo (World Premiere) David Scott
- The Berlin Blues Drew Hayden Taylor
- The Pigeon King (World Premiere) The company (Rebecca Auerbach, Jason Chesworth, Gil Garratt, Gemma James Smith, George Meanwell, J.D. Nicholsen, Birgitte Solem, Severn Thompson)
- Ipperwash (World Premiere) Falen Johnson and Jessica Carmichael

== 2018 ==
- The Pigeon King (World Premiere) The company (Rebecca Auerbach, Jason Chesworth, Gil Garratt, Gemma James Smith, George Meanwell, J.D. Nicholsen, Birgitte Solem, Severn Thompson)
- The New Canadian Curling Club (World Premiere) Mark Crawford
- Judith: Memories of a Lady Pig Farmer (World Premiere) Heather Davies, adapted from Judith, by Aritha van Herk
- 1837: The Farmer's Revolt Rick Salutin and Theatre Passe Muraille
- Wing Night at the Boot (World Premiere) The Company

== 2019 ==
- Jumbo (World Premiere) - Sean Dixon
- Cakewalk - Colleen Curran
- The Team on the Hill - Dan Needles
- In the Wake of Wettlaufer (World Premiere)
- Bed and Breakfast - Mark Crawford
