= Beth Amos =

Canadian actress

- Born: Elizabeth Rymer; January 1, 1916; St. Catharines, Ontario, Canada
- Died: January 31, 1996 (aged 80); Toronto, Ontario, Canada
- Occupations: Actress, writer
- Known for: The Incredible Journey, Bullies

Beth Amos (1 January 1916 – 31 January 1996) was a Canadian stage, television and film actress.

Born in St. Catharines, Ontario, Beth was the youngest of children. At 19 she moved to Toronto to study drama, but the Second World War came and the drama in Canada just was almost over. Amos made her stage debut in the 1930s. She also wrote plays.

== Death ==
Beth Amos died during a matinee while watching Henrik Ibsen’s production "The Master Builder″ at The Royal Alexandra Theatre in Toronto, Ontario, on January 31, 1996, aged 80.

== Personal life ==
She married Robert Bruce Amos (1914-1991) in 1943 and couple had five children. Her daughter Janet Amos became an actress, stage director, playwright and the artistic director of the Blyth Festival (1979-1984 and 1994-1997) and Theatre New Brunswick (1984-1988).

== Filmography ==
- Now That April's Here (1958) - Mrs. Greenleaf (segment "Silk Stockings")
- The Incredible Journey (1963) - Mrs. Oakes
- A Quiet Day in Belfast (1974) (uncredited)
- Love at First Sight (1976) - Motel lady
- Prom Night (1980) - Housekeeper
- Utilities (1983) - Mrs. Linn
- Police Academy (1984) - Little Old Lady
- Bullies (1986) - Martha Hobbs
- Canadian Bacon (1995) - Ruthie
