= The Third Bank of the River =

The Third Bank of the River may refer to:

- The Third Bank of the River (film), a 1994 Brazilian drama film
- The Third Bank of the River (short story), a 1962 short story by João Guimarães Rosa
