= David Widdicombe =

David Widdicombe may refer to:

- David Widdicombe (barrister) (1924–2019), British barrister
- David Widdicombe (filmmaker) (1962–2017), Canadian filmmaker
