= The Infinite Worlds of H. G. Wells =

2001 television miniseries

- Genre: Science fiction
- Based on: H. G. Wells (short stories)
- Screenplay by: Nick Willing, Clive Exton, Matthew Faulk, Chris Harrald, Mark Skeet
- Directed by: Robert Young
- Countries of origin: United States; United Kingdom
- Original language: English
- No. of episodes: 6

Production
- Running time: 265 min

Original release
- Network: Hallmark Channel
- Release: August 5 – August 7, 2001

The Infinite Worlds of H. G. Wells is a four-hour television miniseries conceived by Nick Willing and released in 2001 by the Hallmark Channel. It is based on a number of short stories by H. G. Wells, and in some territories was titled The Scientist.

== Structure and plot ==
Each episode adapts — and sometimes quite radically changes — two of Wells's short stories. The first episode adapts "The New Accelerator" and "The Queer Story of Brownlow's Newspaper." The second episode adapts "The Crystal Egg" and "The Remarkable Case of Davidson's Eyes," and the third, "The Truth About Pyecraft" and "The Stolen Bacillus". Each episode is written as if it were a "real" incident that Wells had investigated with his girlfriend, Jane Robbins, and as if it had served as an inspiration for a short story.

Each short story adaptation is presented as a flashback to 1893 within a frame story set in 1946, near to the end of Wells's life, when he is interviewed by members of a secret military research institute interested in his past exploits.

=== First episode ===
Ellen McGillvray, a young and promising American journalist, meets the famous science fiction writer H. G. Wells, to interview him. She has been sent by an acquaintance of his, Arthur, editor of the Sunday Chronicle. narrates the adventures of his past alongside Cedric Gibberne, recently deceased.

The New Accelerator

Wells and Dr Jane Robbins, who has just started working at Imperial College London, bicker. This bickering continues through the halls of the university and leads Wells and Jane in a classroom where some teachers and some students gathered to attend a demonstration by prof. Gibberne on the relationship between the nervous system and electricity, through the use of an electrovoltaic spectrograph.

During the activation of the spectrograph, however, a frightening roar makes Gibberne and the assistant Whittaker literally fly a few meters from the desk where the experiment was in progress. Recovering from the accident, Gibberne notices the disappearance of the spectrograph and other mysterious happenings.

Wells and Jane thus begin to investigate, finding clues that lead them to a surprising discovery: the existence of an "accelerating drug", invented by Mark Radcliffe, another professor at the university, which allows people, for a short period of time, to be faster than sound. Wells and Jane go to Radcliffe's laboratory, seeing him disappear before their eyes. It will be up to Wells and Gibberne to find out where Radcliffe has disappeared with his drug.

When the story is over, Wells gets up from his chair, convinced that Ellen's interview is over. At that point the journalist takes an agenda from her bag and hands it to the writer, who not only recognises it, but skims through it, beginning to tell another extraordinary story.

The Queer Story of Brownlow's Newspaper

Wells' flashback takes us to an underground tunnel, where Arthur Brownlow, controller of the subway's power lines, is about to work on a generator. An oversight by Arthur leads him to come into contact with some cables, from which he receives an electric shock that knocks him out.

Recovering from the accident, Arthur goes to the pub that he attends regularly. Once he sits down, he orders a drink and, in that moment, he experiences a sensation that he himself defines as when everything that's happening has happened before, a feeling of déjà vu, so much so that he manages to anticipate events and phrases before they happen. Feeling the victim of a joke, Brownlow leaves the pub annoyed, and goes back home.

Returning to the pub the following day, and apologising for his behaviour towards his friends, he explains to them that, in his opinion, the underground accident made him go to the future and then brought him back to the past. Mocked by his friends, Arthur promises to give them a proof, remembering a betting journal he had in his pocket at the time of the accident, which actually bears the date of the supposed coming week. The next day Arthur takes his friends to the hippodrome, winning and making them win huge sums of money.

The scene shifts to Wells, discouraged for lack of inspiration, and to Jane, worried about him, given the evolution of the relationship between the two. Jane tries to help him by bringing him newspapers, hoping that some particular article will help him to find an inspiration. Skimming through the newspapers, Jane finally finds an article worthy of merit, which tells of the wins of Arthur and his friends.

Meanwhile Arthur continues with his bets and wins, followed by his friends. Back in the pub in the evening, they celebrate; among the new faces in the pub, we spot Wells and Jane. At that moment, a friend of Brownlow has an accident, being crushed by a carriage. Shocked by the accident, Brownlow confides in Wells, telling of the underground accident and the lucky week.

Wells understands that Brownlow does not live the future, but the electric discharge has brought him into the past; by modifying the past, Brownlow has irremediably changed it. The only way Arthur has to fix things is to relive the incident in the same way as the week before, in order to go back to the past.

The next day Wells and Jane accompany Brownlow, ready to repeat the incident the week before. After wishing him good luck, they leave, but not before Jane puts Wells's notebook on this fantastic story in Arthur's pocket. Arthur will have the choice whether to repeat the incident in order to return to the past, or continue in the present.

At that point Wells ends his story, and asks Ellen to explain the reason for her visit, as well as her real identity, since the writer considers the entire interview and the journalist a farce. The alleged reporter, surprised by Wells' intuition, tells the truth about her identity and her visit. It turns out that Ellen is actually a government official sent to Wells to gather as much information on Gibberne as possible.

Ellen informs Wells that Gibberne's research was observed and considered of great importance by the Ministry of War. After his death, an armoured trunk was found among his personal effects, containing the writer's diary and other very particular objects of evident scientific importance for the professor. Ellen and Wells go therefore to a building that seems uninhabited but it reveals to be a sort of military base. Ellen brings Wells to the room with the mysterious trunk; having opened it, the writer exclaims: "Uh! Good God alive ... Good God!"

=== Second episode ===
Wells takes from the inside of the trunk an oval-shaped object resembling a stone; according by Ellen, it is a crystalline substance of unknown origin weighing 13 3/4 ounces, resistant to any acid and any attempt to engrave with a diamond. Wells states that the stone, once upon a time, was of rare beauty, and not black and dull as it now appears.

The Crystal Egg

The scene shifts into a clear night, a drunken bum named Skinner with his dog wanders around what appears to be a field. Suddenly a fireball crashes not far from him, and at the moment of impact Skinner falls to earth beating his head and fainting.

In the morning, once awakened, Skinner, attracted by the dog's barking, approaches a huge crater, noticing a large meteorite on the bottom. As he descends into the crater, he hears his dog yelp, followed by several echoes; Skinner keeps calling his dog who seems to have vanished into thin air. Approaching the meteorite, he notices a stone inside that gives off a strong intermittent golden light; as he approaches further, the light seems to go out, becoming crystalline white.

The scene shifts to the university, where Jane meets the bizarre William Cave, according to her naturalist, in search of the vivarium. Jane accompanies him, and, after selling some frogs he had with him for a paltry sum, realises he is late. Leaving his business card with Jane, William runs away, terrified of being late with his wife Rosa.

Once the scene is moved back to Skinner, he is seen walking into an antique shop, hoping to sell the strange stone found in the crater. Entering the store Skinner finds himself having to negotiate the price with the despicable Mrs. Cave, William's greedy and mean wife, who gets the stone for a paltry sum.

At night William, awakened by Rosa's cat, who bursts into the bedroom of the couple terrified, goes to the shop, located downstairs, and notes with amazement that the egg gives off a strange whitish light. He also notes that that light appears to be stimulated by the Moon, whose glow enters in the room through a window.

The following day Mr. Jacoby Wace, a regular customer looking for second-hand jewelry, comes to the shop, and Rose shows him the stone Skinner brought. Analysing it with a monocle and after having discarded several theories (Quartz, Rock Crystal, Lead glass, Tourmaline, etc.), he asks the greedy owner to take a sample with a scalpel. However, as soon as the man touches the crystal egg, it illuminates and emanates a sound similar to a moan, as if endowed with his own will, and then it pushes the scalpel back towards Jacoby, scratching his cheek and sticking itself to the wall behind him.

"Oh my God, it's as if it were alive! The sound it made... my advice Rosa, sell it, sell it quick, to the first person who makes you an offer."

— (Jacoby Wace to Rosa after cutting the crystal egg with a scalpel)

The scene shifts for a moment to Ellen and Wells, where we learn that Gibberne, about 5 years after the events (according to Ellen, as soon as the devices are available), x-rayed the egg, discovering that its internal structure resembles a human brain in all its characteristics.

Back in the antiques shop, the scene focuses on William, maniacally attracted to the mysterious object. Meanwhile Wells goes to the shop, following Jane's advice not to stay holed up in the house; however, as he is about to enter the shop, he finds the door closed and sees William grabbing the egg from the window and disappearing into the dim light.

Locking himself in a room, William tries to recreate the situation of the previous night, making a glimmer of light touch the egg. Realising that the egg reacts to any light source, as long as it receives it at a precise angle, the man reactivates the strange object, remaining enchanted. Looking more carefully he notices that a sort of world hides in that glow, a sandy expanse with a reddish color, where a few moments later a strange creature reminiscent of an insect appears. The unexpected arrival of Mrs. Rosa awakens William from the enchantment that the egg was exercising on him, bringing the latter to his natural state.

Frightened by the vision of the creature inside the egg, William goes to Jane asking for information about her strange being, given her knowledge of the matter. A few moments later Wells enters the room, and after learning of the details about the crystal egg, he goes to the antique shop to view the object.

Having managed to get the egg, after a fight with another buyer, Wells takes the object to his house, asking William to activate it. Turning off the lights in the room and placing a candle next to the egg, the object begins to glow, showing Wells and Jane the same vision that appeared to William a short time before. Wells's vision becomes more and more clear, coming to see the creature described by William, a creature that a few seconds later emerges from the egg assuming human proportions and trying to grab Wells by the arm.

Only the clarity of Jane, who suddenly opens the door to the room, manages to trap the creature again inside the egg, which becomes harmless again. There will be several thoughts haunting the writer, who step by step will be able to outline a disconcerting reality.

At the end of the story, Ellen bring Wells to a restaurant inside the building, and then mentions that she found a file on him, old but still open, with the security services. Hearing that the name of the file is "H.M.S. Fulmar", Wells begins to tell another story.

The Remarkable Case of Davidson's Eyes

As a result of an unauthorised experiment at the college, young lab assistant Sidney Davidson, nephew of Dean Frederick Masterman, begins seeing visions of a ship at sea and a deserted island. Completely overwhelmed by the hallucinations, he is locked up in a psychiatric asylum directed by Dr. Symonds.

Since Jane was also involved, Wells discusses what could have gone wrong with Dr. Bellows, who designed the experiment, and with Whittaker. Taking a broken coil with him, Wells goes to the coil's factory, where a chatty employee mentions that they made two identical copies of that coil, before being dismissed by his boss. Following the employee to the pub, Wells finds out that the Navy ordered a copy of the same coil.

Jane, who in the meantime moved together with Wells, visits Sidney frequently at the asylum and discusses his mental health with Dr. Symonds, trying to understand the origin of Sidney's visions. Putting together what they discovered, Jane and Wells believe there Sidney is not hallucinating, but the experiment made his eyes witnessing an island where the ship carrying the second coil sunk a few days ago. Wells inquires Captain Hapgood about recently sunken ships, but he quickly sent away.

When Dean Masterman returns from his journey and rushes to the asylum to see his nephew, Jane and Wells profit of his heated discussion with Dr. Symonds to run away with Sidney. At the university, the Dean finally meets his nephew, who discovered that there is another survivor on the island, and listens to Jane and Wells' explanations of the events. Together, they confront Captain Hapgood again and discover that Atkins, a Navy lieutenant, was indeed reported missing on a recently wreckage. With the information given by Sidney, they manage to rescue him, and after that Dr. Symonds is able to revert the initial experiment and restore Sidney' sight back to normal.

When the story is over, Wells ask Ellen to explain what is the building they are in. Instead of replying, she brings him to her boss: Whittaker. He reveals that the building was a secret laboratory, established at the beginning at the War and unrestricted in the scope of its research, where he and Gibberne worked. He then shows that they found, among Gibberne's properties, a liquid which can make a monkey lose weight.

=== Third episode ===
The episode starts immediately with a story about the origin of the liquid shown at the end of the second episode.

The Truth About Pyecraft

Albert Pyecraft, a fellow of a club of which also Wells is member, is a mathematics genius, despite working as a common teacher at a crammer directed by the cruel Mr. Jagger. Moreover, he is in love with Violet, a young maid who takes private classes with him, but he is extremely insecure due to his fatness.

A friend of him, Mark Pattison, on advice of a colleague, visits a shady pharmacist and obtains a miraculous cure for his baldness. Showing Albert the quick regrowth of his hair, he convinces him to get a similar potion to cure his fatness.

When Albert does not show up for work or at the club for two days, Wells goes to his place and finds him floating on the ceiling: his wish to "lose weight" has been interpreted too literally. Wells and Jane help Albert to walk again on the ground by putting lead in his clothes. Visiting the club, he finds Pattison hidden in the bathroom and victim of the same cure he requested: his hair keeps growing at high rate all over his body.

The day after, Wells and Jane accompany Albert to Oxford to compete for the Möbius prize. Albert, who forgot about the competition in the past days and is forced to improvise, regain his security when Violet enters the room, and deliver his lecture. At the end, Albert loses the competition but the committee offers him a professorship at Oxford; having finally found his courage, he asks Violet to marry him.

At the end, we see Gibberne trying without success to replicate the mysterious potion and Wells comforting Pattison that its effects should disappear soon. He then meets Jane in front of the university and ask her to marry him.

In the frame story, Whittaker wonders if the recipe of the potion might have been preserved, but Wells states that no good would have come of it. He then leaves the building together with Ellen and return at home. When Ellen inquires how can Wells be so sure that Jane was his true soulmate, he start to tell a last story, about what made them "scientifically certain" of each other's feelings.

The Stolen Bacillus

Thomas Keating is abusing of Wells and Jane's hospitality, but Wells is reluctant to kick him out since he enjoys being constantly flattered for his writing qualities. Keating asks Wells to arrange a meeting with professor Gibberne, since he admires his research on viruses and bacilli. At the university, they discover that Whittaker is currently at the hospital with a broken leg, due to a previous experiment leading to an explosion; his place has been temporarily taken by Harold, Gibberne's inept nephew.

While Wells and Keating visit the Parliament, and Keating reveals afterwards his anarchist ideas, Jane finds in Keating's room several maps and articles about the water supply system of the city, as well as and a notebook written in secret code. She is convinced that Keating is hiding something, while Wells believes she is overreacting.

As Whittaker returns earlier from the hospital, Gibberne is desperate because Harold disappeared with the flask of a bacillus. Since Harold has stupidly rearranged them, Gibberne doesn't know which bacillus is missing, so cannot predict the outcome: dropping it in drinking water can potentially endanger the whole country with a disease. After Harold is arrested for being drunk, he admits that Keating offered him money for the cholera bacillum. However, since he couldn't distinguish one from the other, he just stole and sold him a random serum.

Wells rushes to the water reservoir, but doesn't manage to stop Keating before he empties the content of flask. Wells however brings back to the university the tag of the flask, and Gibberne identifies it as a truth serum, a creation of its own. Everybody is relieved that it is not a deadly disease, despite Gibberne warning them that the consequences can be unexpected (when he tried the serum on himself, it took months for his wife to forgive him after the things he said to her).

In the following days, everybody is forced to tell the truth: Dean Masterman says he is in love with Gibberne, many husbands are kicked out of their houses by their wives, the British secretary for foreign affairs insults his French counterpart creating a diplomatic crisis, Keating (now in prison) tells Wells that his stories are rubbish, and Jane reveals that she is pregnant.

At the end of the story, Wells thanks Ellen for bringing back all these memories and decides he will start writing again.

== Production ==
The filming was done as a full period costume drama, and also took full advantage of notable London locations. These included the London Underground, where scenes from Brownlow's Newspaper were shot at the disused Aldwych tube station.

== Actual historical events and places ==
The miniseries' opening premise is that in 1893 Wells was scientifically untrained, and single. In reality he was neither of those things in 1893. He had studied Zoology and Geology at the Normal School of Science in London, gaining a second-class zoology degree in 1887, but failing the final geology examination. He then taught science in schools in Wrexham and London whilst studying to re-take both subjects, eventually gaining first-class honours in Zoology and second-class in Geology in 1890. He then secured a teaching post at the University Correspondence College, and in 1891 he married his cousin, Isabel Mary Wells. Wells began writing to supplement his teaching income, and in 1893 met Amy Catherine Robbins, one of his students. Disliking the name "Amy", he called her "Jane". In 1894 Wells left his wife to live with Jane, and they married later that year, after his divorce from Isabel.

At the opening of the miniseries Amy Robbins is instead called Jane Robbins and is shown to be a teacher of Biology, with Wells initially one of her two potential suitors — the other being a member of the college staff. Wells is portrayed as a single man, a jobbing journalist and aspiring fiction writer with just five stories to his name.

=== Anachronisms ===
Given the reference dates given to us during the various stories, it is assumed that the events narrated by the writer took place over a period of 7 years. These references are given by two elements:

- At the beginning of the first episode, the setting year (1893) appears. Furthermore, Whittaker states that the accident happened in July.
- At the end of the sixth chapter (1900), Jane confesses to her Wells that she is pregnant.

Despite this, some elements are anachronisms, both in reference to real events, and in reference to the evolution of the characters and their relationships.

The New Accelerator

- The Imperial College of Science — where Jane Robbins is depicted as teaching — did not exist in 1893. In 1890 the Normal School of Science — where Wells had studied — became the Royal College of Science, which in 1907 was amalgamated with other institutions to form the Imperial College of Science and Technology.
- The electrovoltaic spectrograph shown by Gibberne is none other than the mass spectrometer invented by Joseph John Thomson in 1912.
- Prof. Gibberne talks to Wells about X-rays, while the first public announcement took place on December 28, 1895.
- When they open a closet, Wells and Jane find hundreds of cans of food, including the Forest City Brand (1920) of the L. Allen & Sons Company founded in 1901.

The Queer Story of Brownlow's Newspaper

- In the scene where Wells and Jane are having tea, the newspaper that is shown (Daily Graphic) bears the date Monday, September 18, 1893, the same day as the discovery of Mark Radcliffe's body in the first episode, while according to the story it is June 5, 1893.
- In the scene where Jane brings the newspapers to Wells, depressed by the lack of inspiration, the article on Brownlow's wins shows the date June 6, 1893.

The Truth About Pyecraft

- Wells says that Pyecraft "found three different proofs of Riemann hypothesis when he was just 15 years old". The Riemann hypothesis (formulated in 1859) is still an open conjecture as of today.
- After awarding the Möbius prize (which does not exist in real life), the chair of the committee says that Isaac Newton died 179 years ago; since he died on 1727, it is implied that the story is set in 1906.
- In the same occasion, the chair mentions also that Newton had a professorial chair at Oxford, which became vacant after his death. Actually, Newton never taught at Oxford; they are probably referring to the Lucasian chair in Cambridge (which however had never been vacant after Newton's death).
- Albert Einstein was born in 1879, so he was in his 20's at the time of the story, despite being depicted significantly older.

== Cast ==
=== Main cast ===
- Tom Ward - H. G. Wells (stories 1-6, frame story)
- Katy Carmichael - Jane Robbins (stories 1-6)
- Eve Best - Ellen McGillvray (frame story)
- Nicholas Rowe - Professor Cedric Gibberne (stories 1-6)
- Matthew Cottle - Whittaker (stories 1-6)
- Barry Stanton - Dean Frederick Masterman (stories 1,4,6)

=== Episodic cast ===
The New Accelerator:

- Ray Coulthard - Mark Radcliffe

Brownlow's Newspaper:

- Mark Lewis Jones - Arthur Brownlow
- Robert Demeger - Frank Harris

The Crystal Egg:

- Stephen Critchlow - William Cave
- Tilly Vosburgh - Rosa Cave

The Remarkable Case of Davidson's Eyes:

- Dominic Cooper - Sidney Davidson
- Jeffry Wickham - Dr. Symonds
- Mark Dexter - Atkins

The Truth About Pyecraft:

- Michael Fitzgerald - Albert Pyecraft
- Pip Torrens - Mark Pattison
- Catherine Bailey - Violet
- John Bennett - Mr. Jagger
- Orlando Seale - Albert Einstein
- Donald Douglas - Chairman at Praecentors

The Stolen Bacillus:

- Nicholas Boulton - Thomas Keating
- William Mannering - Harold
- Hugh Dickson - Opposition MP
- Vincent Franklin - War Minister (Henry Campbell-Bannerman)
- Richard Clifford - Foreign Secretary (The Earl of Rosebery)

== DVD releases ==
A Region 2 DVD of the series in non-episodic form was released in the Netherlands in 2004 with the original English language soundtrack, and optional Dutch and French subtitles. A Region 1 DVD in episodic form was released in 2005. It was released in the UK in 2006.

== See also ==
- The Nightmare Worlds of H. G. Wells - a similar 2016 anthology series
- H. G. Wells bibliography
