= Something I've Been Meaning to Tell You =

1974 book by Alice Munro

- First edition cover
- Author: Alice Munro
- Genre: Short story collection
- Publisher: McGraw-Hill
- Publication date: 1974
- ISBN: 978-0-451-09238-0

Something I've Been Meaning to Tell You is a book of short stories by Alice Munro, published by McGraw-Hill (Canada) in 1974.

== Stories ==
- "Something I've Been Meaning to Tell You"
- "Material"
- "How I Met My Husband"
- "Walking on Water"
- "Forgiveness in Families"
- "Tell Me Yes or No"
- "The Found Boat"
- "Executioners"
- "Marrakesh"
- "The Spanish Lady"
- "Winter Wind"
- "Memorial"
- "The Ottawa Valley"
