= Ted Johns =

Canadian playwright (born 1942)

- Born: 1942 (age 83–84); Seaforth, Ontario
- Occupation: Playwright
- Writing career
- Genre: plays

Ted Johns is a Canadian playwright, born in Seaforth, Ontario in 1942. His plays have been primarily produced at the Blyth Festival but also at Theatre New Brunswick, Theatre Passe Muraille, and the Upper Canada Playhouse.

== Plays ==
- Naked on the North Shore, 1974
- He Won't Come in From the Barn, 1977
- The School Show, 1978
- The Death of the Donnellys, 1979
- St. Sam and the Nukes, 1980
- Country Hearts, 1982
- Garrison's Garage, 1984
- Hands of Healing, 1987
- Two Brothers, 1991
- Back Up and Push, 1992
