= Martha, Ruth and Edie =

- Directed by: Deepa Mehta; Norma Bailey; Danièle J. Suissa
- Written by: Janet Maclean; Anna Sandor; Barbara O'Kelly
- Produced by: Deepa Mehta; Paul Saltzman
- Starring: Lois Maxwell; Andrea Martin; Jennifer Dale; Margaret Langrick
- Cinematography: Douglas Koch
- Edited by: Lara Mazur
- Music by: Alexina Louie; Alex Pauk
- Production company: Sunrise Films
- Release date: 1988
- Running time: 92 minutes
- Country: Canada
- Language: English

Martha, Ruth and Edie is a Canadian drama film released in 1988. An anthology film directed by Deepa Mehta, Norma Bailey and Danièle J. Suissa, it centers on the titular Martha (Jennifer Dale), Ruth (Andrea Martin) and Edie (Lois Maxwell), who meet after being locked out of the auditorium at a personal development seminar, and instead share personal stories from their own lives among themselves. Each of their stories is a dramatization of a short story by a Canadian writer, and is directed by one of the three credited directors.

"How I Met My Husband", directed by Bailey from the short story by Alice Munro, depicts how Edie's brief teenage romantic fling with a visiting pilot, followed by her persistent but unfulfilled hope that he will write her letters after he leaves, ultimately leads to her meeting and marrying the mailman. (Edie is played by Margaret Langrick in the flashback.) "California Aunts", directed by Mehta from the story by Cynthia Flood, depicts the transformation of Ruth's life as a smalltown librarian after her mother dies and her aunts come to stay with her. "Guilt", directed by Suissa from the story by Betty Lambert, depicts Martha taking a new job teaching English in a prison after her husband leaves her for another woman.

The film's supporting cast includes Helen Hughes, Tom Jackson, Frank Moore, Chuck Shamata, Tom Butler and Kate Trotter. Hughes received a Genie Award nomination for Best Supporting Actress at the 10th Genie Awards in 1989.
