= Beverley Cooper =

Canadian actor, director and playwright

Beverley Jane Cooper
- Born: Vancouver, British Columbia, Canada
- Occupations: Actor director dramaturg educator playwright
- Years active: 1979–present
- Spouse: John Jarvis
- Children: 2

Beverley Cooper is a Canadian actor, director, dramaturg, and playwright who works in film, radio, television, and theatre.

== Acting ==
Cooper trained in acting and graduated from Studio 58 in Vancouver in 1979.

In 1982, Toronto Star critic Gina Mallet named Cooper Best Supporting Actress for her appearance in Paul Gross's Dead of Winter, which had its premiere at the Toronto Free Theatre in October 1982.

Cooper went on to initiate such notable roles as Juliet in Ann-Marie MacDonald's Goodnight Desdemona (Good Morning Juliet), a Canadian feminist theatre classic first produced in 1988 by Toronto's Nightwood Theatre, and Fedoysa in the premiere of George F. Walker's award-winning play Nothing Sacred.

== Writing ==
Cooper is most well-known as a playwright. She graduated from the Creative Writing MFA program at the University of Guelph in 2013.

She has written numerous original pieces and adaptations for CBC Radio Drama. She worked as story editor on the award-winning series, Afghanada, and she also produced the show's second season and directed five of its episodes. Cooper dramatized The Englishman's Boy (1998), Alias Grace (1998), Away, The Secret World of Og (Silver Medal Award Winner – New York Festival – International Radio Awards, 2006), and adapted Rohinton Mistry's book, A Fine Balance (2005), which, liker her original play, It Came from Beyond!, garnered her a nomination for a Writers Guild of Canada Award. Another popular original drama is Cooper's series, The Super Adventures of Mary Marvelous.

Cooper's most well-known play is Innocence Lost: A Play about Steven Truscott, which was a shortlisted Governor General's Award nominee for the English-language drama in 2009. It was a sold-out hit at the Blyth Festival in 2008 and 2009, moving on to play Ottawa's National Arts Centre in 2013.

Cooper's play Thin Ice, co-written with Baņuta Rubess, won a Dora Mavor Moore Award and a Chalmers Award. Another notable work is Janet Wilson Meets the Queen, which was nominated for the Prix Rideau Award.

Writing credits for television include episodes of Ready or Not, Sesame Park, and Street Legal.

Currently, Cooper is also directing audio books for Penguin Random House.

== Plays ==
- Nancy Drew, The Case of the Missing Mother (co-written with Ann-Marie MacDonald)
- Clue in the Fast Lane (co-written with Ann-Marie MacDonald)
- Psychic Driving (radio drama)
- Nellie Bly: Ten Days in a Madhouse
- Out of Body
- Thin Ice (co-written with Baņuta Rubess)
- The Super Adventures of Mary Marvelous (radio drama)
- Sheila Goes to War (radio drama)
- The Woman in White
- Innocence Lost: A Play about Steven Truscott
- The Eyes of Heaven
- The Lonely Diner: Al Capone in Euphemia Township
- It Came from Beyond!
- If Truth Be Told
- Janet Wilson Meets the Queen
- The Other: A Strange Christmas Tale
