= Janet Amos =

Canadian actress (born 1945)

- Born: 1945 (age 80–81)
- Spouse: Ted Johns
- Parent: Beth Amos (mother)

Academic background
- Education: University of Toronto (BA, BEd)

Academic work
- Discipline: Theatre
- Sub-discipline: Theatre directing · playwriting · theatre education
- Institutions: University of Regina; University of Ottawa; National Theatre School of Canada

Janet Amos (born 1945) is a Canadian theatre actress, director, educator, and playwright.

== Education ==
Amos studied under Marjorie Purvey at the Toronto School of Radio Drama in the 1950s. She earned Bachelor of Arts and Bachelor of Education degrees from the University of Toronto.

== Career ==
Amos has led theatre companies as the artistic director of the Blyth Festival (1979–1984 and 1994–1997) and Theatre New Brunswick (1984–1988). She worked as an assistant professor of the University of Regina (2003–2006), as a guest artist at the University of Ottawa (2008) and as instructor at the National Theatre School of Canada in Montreal.

Amos is credited as leading an effort to save the Blyth Festival from closure, when she took over as the artistic director in 1994. Prior to her assuming the role of artistic director, the Blyth Festival had lost thousands of audience members and amassed a $229,000 debt. Amos' drove a fundraising campaign that raised more than $100,000 and created a season line-up that brought audiences back, helping the summer theatre to survive.

Amos also directed theatre productions at Toronto's Theatre Passe Muraille, Port Dover's Lighthouse Theatre, Regina's Globe Theatre, London, Ontario's Grand Theatre, Edmonton's Citadel Theatre and Ottawa's National Arts Centre, among others.

Amos appeared as an actor in the Canadian films Winter Kept Us Warm (1965), High (1969), Silence of the North (1981), Taking Care (1987), and More than Meets the Eye: The Joan Brock Story (2003). TV show guest acting credits include Ada (1976), Road to Avonlea (1992), Twice in a Lifetime (2000), and PSI Factor: Chronicles of the Paranormal (2000).

Amos' work has been recognized through various awards. The village of Blyth, Ontario, gave her a Citizen of the Year Award in 1994, the University of Western Ontario awarded her an honorary degree in 1998 and the Association for Canadian Theatre Research made her an honorary member in 2005.

== Personal life ==
Amos is daughter of the actress Beth Amos. She is married to Canadian playwright Ted Johns.

== Filmography ==
=== Film ===
Year	Title	Role	Notes
1965	Winter Kept Us Warm	Sandra	
1981	Silence of the North	Nelly	
1987	Taking Care	Marie	

=== Television ===
Year	Title	Role	Notes
1978	The Massey's	Eliza Massey	Television film
1978–1979	A Gift to Last	Clara Sturgess	3 episodes
1992	Road to Avonlea	Mrs. Spry	Episode: "Another Point of View"
2000	Twice in a Lifetime	M.C. Chandler	Episode: "Old Flames"
2000	Psi Factor	Heather Buckley	Episode: "Wendigo"
