= The Queer Story of Brownlow's Newspaper =

- Short story by H. G. Wells
- Country: United Kingdom
- Genre: Science fiction

Publication

"The Queer Story of Brownlow's Newspaper" is a short story by H. G. Wells which was first published in the February 1932 issue of the Ladies' Home Journal.

== Plot summary ==
The story takes place on 10 November 1931 and opens with the protagonist, Brownlow, accidentally being delivered a newspaper dated 10 November 1971. The story is mainly a description of the contents of the newspaper, which features color photography throughout, with Wells taking the opportunity to issue some prophecies of what he thought 1971 might hold. His successful predictions include lower birth rates, an emphasis on psychological motivation in fiction, geothermal energy, and wider coverage of scientific news, while others include simplified spelling of English, a 13-month reformed calendar, the extinction of gorillas, and hints at some form of world government.

== Adaptations ==
An adaptation of the story formed part of the first episode of the four-hour miniseries The Infinite Worlds of H. G. Wells released in 2001 by the Hallmark Channel, with Arthur Brownlow played by Mark Lewis Jones.

== See also ==
- Communication from the future
