= The Truth About Pyecraft =

- Short story by H. G. Wells
- Country: United Kingdom
- Language: English
- Genre: short story

Publication

"The Truth About Pyecraft" is a British fantasy-comedy short story by H. G. Wells. It was originally published in The Strand Magazine (April 1903), and then included in the Twelve Stories and a Dream story collection, in 1903. It has been frequently reprinted.

== Plot summary ==
The repellently fat Mr. Pyecraft is a patron of a London club, who usually pesters Mr. Formalyn, to the point that the latter eventually decides to write Pyecraft's true story, for revealing an unbelievable, yet embarrassing, secret which is shared by both.

In the beginning of Formalyn's account, the rotund Pyecraft usually annoys him, with his boring stories and particularly about his obesity troubles. Eventually, Formalyn brings an occult weight-loss recipe of his Hindustani great-grandmother, and Pyecraft tries it for some time. Then, Pyecraft telegraphs Formalyn at the club, calling him to Pyecraft's house in Bloomsbury, where the housekeeper tells him that Pyecraft has been cloistered in his own living room for the last twenty-four hours. There, he is found, as rounded as ever, floating helplessly in the air, against the ceiling. They conclude that the recipe has literally reduced his weight, not his fatness.

Formalyn assists with various ingenious devices and techniques to allow Pyecraft to traverse his room while floating. For example, Pyecraft gets down from the bookcase by taking out a couple of heavy tomes of the Encyclopædia Britannica. Some time later, it occurs to Formalyn that Pyecraft's garments could be stuffed with heavy lead pieces to keep him on the ground; he even remarks that Pyecraft could sail without fear of a shipwreck, for he could just hover ashore after removing some of the weight.

Pyecraft returns to the club with Formalyn's assistance, though without change to his porcine habits. Initially, the two of them agree to keep the embarrassing secret of Pyecraft's weightlessness, but the obsessive Pyecraft soon starts to annoy him too much.

== Adaptations ==
- A short cartoon was made by Soyuzmultfilm in 1986, called How to Lose Weight ("Как потерять вес")
- A radio version of the story was produced for the CBC series Vanishing Point in 1987
- The story was adapted as part of the third episode of the 2001 miniseries, The Infinite Worlds of H. G. Wells.
