= Canadian Bacon =

1995 film by Michael Moore

- Theatrical release poster
- Directed by: Michael Moore
- Written by: Michael Moore
- Produced by: David Brown; Michael Moore; Ron Rotholz
- Starring: Alan Alda; John Candy; Bill Nunn; Kevin J. O'Connor; Rhea Perlman; Kevin Pollak; G.D. Spradlin; Rip Torn
- Cinematography: Haskell Wexler
- Edited by: Wendey Stanzler; Michael Berenbaum
- Music by: Elmer Bernstein; Peter Bernstein
- Production companies: PolyGram Filmed Entertainment; Propaganda Films; David Brown Productions; Maverick Picture Company
- Distributed by: Gramercy Pictures
- Release date: September 22, 1995
- Running time: 90 minutes
- Countries: United States; Canada
- Language: English
- Budget: $11 million
- Box office: $178,104

Canadian Bacon is a 1995 comedy film written, produced, and directed by Michael Moore which satirizes Canada–United States relations along the Canada–United States border. The film stars an ensemble cast featuring Alan Alda, John Candy (in his final film role), Bill Nunn, Kevin J. O'Connor, Rhea Perlman, Kevin Pollak, G. D. Spradlin, and Rip Torn. It tells the story of a struggling President who is persuaded by his confidants to fight with Canada when a local sheriff and his friends get involved.

The film was screened in the Un Certain Regard section at the 1995 Cannes Film Festival, and was the final film released starring John Candy, though it was shot before the earlier-released Wagons East as both films are dedicated in memory of him. It is also Moore's only non-documentary film to date. The film had a limited theatrical release on September 22nd, 1995 and received negative reviews from critics and was a box office failure that grossed only $178,104 against an $11 million budget.

== Plot ==
In Niagara Falls, New York, at the end of the Cold War, military businessman R. J. Hacker closes down his weapons manufacturing plant Hacker Dynamics. Thousands of former employees are outraged. Sheriff Bud Boomer and his deputy/girlfriend Honey prevent the despondent former Hacker employee Roy Boy from committing suicide at Niagara Falls.

At a auction of weaponry produced by Hacker Dynamics, to offset Hacker’s loss of profits, Hacker pins the blame for the shutdown of his business on the visiting President of the United States. The President defends his own belief that the children's future is more important than war which has caused major decline in his approval rating.

After the press conference where Boomer saves the President from an assassination attempt by Roy Boy, the President confides in General Dick Panzer and National Security Advisor Stuart Smiley (who secretly has ties with Hacker) that he is unhappy about not having an enemy to engage with.

Boomer eventually criticizes Canadian beer in an offensive manner while attending a hockey game with Honey, Roy Boy, and deputy sheriff Kabral Jabar between the neighboring nations in Niagara Falls, Ontario causing a brawl to break out. The ensuing riot ends up on the news the next day and catches Stuart's attention. Stuart collects more information about Canada from CIA agent Gus and suggests Canada as their new enemy during a cabinet meeting.

Before long, U.S. television channels are littered with anti-Canada propaganda which Boomer believes wholeheartedly. He prepares for war by distributing guns to Honey, Roy Boy, and Kabral. He also helps form a local militia. After they apprehend Gus and a group of Americans "dressed as Canadians" attempting to destroy a hydroelectric plant despite Gus's protests that they are just Americans, they sneak across the border to litter on Canadian lands which leads to Honey being left behind and arrested by the Mounties. In a rescue attempt, Boomer, Roy Boy, and Kabral sneak into a Canadian power plant and cause a countrywide blackout. When the President learns of this, Stuart orders the Omega Force to remove Boomer from Canada before it is too late as Boomer gets separated from Kabral and Roy Boy.

Seeking revenge on the President for shutting down his business, Hacker uses a software program ("Hacker Hellstorm") to activate missile silos across the country. The President learns that the signal causing the activation of the silos originated from Canada. As Stuart tells the President that the information is classified, the President summons Hacker for some answers. Hacker offers to sell a program to the President that can cancel out the Hellstorm—for $1 trillion. With six minutes left, and fed up with the President being too busy to give Hacker the money, Stuart realizes that a departing Hacker is the one controlling the silos, not Canada. After storming up, Stuart takes the operating codes from him required to stop the Hellstorm while accidentally killing Hacker in the process. The still busy President orders Stuart's arrest despite his protests that he is now able to give the codes to the President so they could deactivate the missiles which are aimed at Moscow, but the guards don’t believe him. As the US government loses contact with Omega Force and as the launch time approaches, the President pleads with Canadian Prime Minister Clark MacDonald over the phone to stop the launch.

Meanwhile, Honey was taken to a hospital upon her capture and escaped all the way to the CN Tower. She discovers the central computer for the Hellstorm and destroys it with a machine gun, aborting the launch sequence. Honey then reunites with Boomer and they return to the United States on a speedboat across Lake Ontario.

Before the final shot of Boomer and Honey's speedboat unknowingly heading towards the waterfall is shown, an epilogue reveals what happened afterwards:

- Boomer realizes his dream - and became a regular on Cops.
- Honey is named the National Rifle Association's "Humanitarian of the Year".
- The President was defeated in the next election by the largest landslide in U.S. history. He now hosts Get Up, Cleveland.
- Stuart served 8 months of a life sentence where he was pardoned by President Ollie North.
- General Panzer took his own life upon learning Hogan's Heroes was entirely fictional.
- Gus was last spotted heading south. He was seen entering Mexico in a tank.
- The body of Hacker can be viewed daily from 9:00 AM to 5:00 PM at Republican National Headquarters.
- Kabral has become the National Hockey League's Most Valuable Player three years in a row. His hockey card ironically showed him playing defense for the Toronto Maple Leafs.
- Roy Boy's whereabouts are unknown.
- Prime Minister MacDonald is "still ruling with an iron fist".

== Cast ==
- Alan Alda as the unnamed deeply unpopular President of the United States
- John Candy as Bud B. Boomer, the sheriff of Niagara County
- Bill Nunn as Kabral Jabar, the deputy sheriff and friend and colleague of Sheriff Bud Boomer
- Kevin J. O'Connor as Roy Boy, friend of Sheriff Bud Boomer
- Rhea Perlman as Honey, a deputy sheriff and girlfriend and colleague of Sheriff Bud Boomer
- Kevin Pollak as Stuart "Stu" Smiley, the National Security Advisor to the President
- G. D. Spradlin as R.J. Hacker, the owner of Hacker Dynamics
- Rip Torn as General Dick Panzer, the Commander of USSOCOM
- Steven Wright as a Niagara Falls Mountie who tells Bud where Honey was taken
- Jim Belushi as Charles Jackal, a news reporter for NBS News
- Richard E. Council as Vladimir Kruschkin, the President of Russia
- Brad Sullivan as Gus, a CIA agent sent by Smiley to gather information about Canada
- Wallace Shawn as Clark MacDonald, the Prime Minister of Canada
- Stanley Anderson as Edwin S. Simon, a news anchor for NBS News
- Ben Hamper and Michael Moore as two redneck guys that take part in the Anti-Canada Protest
- Beth Amos as Ruthie
- Sheila Gray as the voice of the Hacker Hellstrom
- Dan Aykroyd as an OPP officer who pulls Boomer over (uncredited)
- James Carville as a Pentagon agent for Central Intelligence (uncredited)
- Ed Sahely as a Mountie (uncredited)
- Gordon Michael Woolvett as a Male Candy Striper (uncredited)

== Production ==
Moore was inspired by the pro-war sentiment and 90% approval rating for President George H. W. Bush at the time of the Gulf War and wondered if the president could gain public support for war on any country, even Canada.

The film was shot in fall 1993, in Toronto, Hamilton, and Niagara Falls, Ontario; and Buffalo and Niagara Falls, New York. Scenes depicting the rapids of the Niagara River were actually filmed at Twelve Mile Creek in St. Catharines. Parkwood Estate in Oshawa was the site for the White House, and Dofasco in Hamilton was the site for Hacker Dynamics. The scene where the American characters look longingly home at the US across the putative Niagara River is them looking across Burlington Bay at Stelco steelworks in Hamilton, Ontario.

The hockey game and riot were shot at the Niagara Falls Memorial Arena in Niagara Falls, Ontario, and the actors portraying the police officers (who eventually join in the riot upon hearing "Canadian beer sucks") are wearing authentic Niagara Regional Police uniforms.

Originally, PolyGram Filmed Entertainment had arranged for the film to be released by Metro-Goldwyn-Mayer (MGM) in the fall of 1994. However, PolyGram later started its own distribution company, Gramercy Pictures, with Universal Pictures in the summer of 1993, and battled with MGM to get the distribution rights back from them. Gramercy ultimately gave the film a limited release in 1995. Today, MGM now owns the film through their acquisition of the pre-1996 PolyGram library.

The film has numerous cameos by Canadian actors, including Dan Aykroyd, who appears uncredited as an Ontario Provincial Police officer who pulls Candy over (not for the crude anti-Canadian graffiti on his truck, but its lack of a French translation; Boomer dutifully sprays his truck in French graffiti). Moore himself appears as an American gun nut. Cameo pictures of Canadian-American actors in propaganda include William Shatner, Michael J. Fox, Lorne Greene and Alex Trebek.

== Reception ==
=== Box office ===
Canadian Bacon received a limited theatrical release by Gramercy Pictures on September 22, 1995. Due to this release, the film was a significant box office failure that grossed only $178,104 against a $11 million budget.

=== Critical reception ===
Canadian Bacon received unfavorable reviews by critics. On the review aggregator website Rotten Tomatoes, 19% of 21 critics' reviews are positive.

The A.V. Club's Nathan Rabin in a 2009 review concluded, "After generating solid laughs during its first hour, Canadian Bacon falls apart in its third act," lamenting the film "was perceived as too lowbrow for the highbrows, and too highbrow for the lowbrows."

== See also ==
- Canada–United States relations
- The Canadian Conspiracy, a 1985 mockumentary about how Canadian entertainers are conquering TV and movies in the United States.
- Dr. Strangelove or: How I Learned to Stop Worrying and Love the Bomb, a 1964 Stanley Kubrick comedy about a fictional escalation of tensions in the Cold War.
- The Mouse That Roared, a 1955 novel (and 1959 film) about a tiny country which fought a war with the USA and won.
- South Park: Bigger, Longer & Uncut, the 1999 South Park animated film in which the U.S. declares war on Canada.
- "A Speculative Fiction", a song by Canadian band Propagandhi that explores a war between Canada and the U.S.
- Wag the Dog, a 1997 film about a war devised for propaganda reasons.
- The real-life War of 1812 between the United States and British North America (now Canada). This war was started when the War Hawks (territorial expansionists) within the US government capitalized on Great Britain's interference with trade between the United States and France to advance their theory of Manifest Destiny (the belief that the United States was fated to take control of all of North America) by declaring war on the Dominion of Canada.
- War Plan Red, also known as the Atlantic Strategic War Plan, was a plan for the United States to make war with Great Britain, by attacking Canada.
- The real-life French and Indian War between Great Britain and France which also involved the colonies (then part of British North America) and New France which is now Canada.
- Weird Al's song "Canadian Idiot" makes light of some of the same cliches of US and Canadians, and ends with the suggestion of a "preemptive strike."
