= How I Met My Husband =

- Short story by Alice Munro
- Country: Canada
- Language: English
- Genre: short story

Publication
- Published in: Something I've Been Meaning to Tell You
- Publication date: 1974

"How I Met My Husband" is a short story written by Alice Munro, first published in 1974 as a part of her collection Something I've Been Meaning to Tell You.

== Plot summary ==
The story is about a young girl, Edie, who is hired help for Dr. Peebles and his family. One afternoon while the family is away in town, Edie meets Chris Watters, a pilot who travels from town to town giving rides in his plane for a fee. Edie falls in love with him, but soon learns that he is engaged to another woman, Alice Kelling. Alice is crazy and has been following Chris everywhere in hopes of marrying him. One day while Alice, Mrs. Peebles and the children were away on a picnic, Edie goes to Chris's campsite to talk with him. He reveals to her that he plans on leaving, but promises to write her. They kiss, and he leaves town. When the other women are told by the local gossip Loretta Bird that Chris has left, Alice Kelling verbally abuses Edie under the mistaken impression that Edie and Chris had sex. Mrs. Peebles protects Edie, and Alice leaves too. Edie waits day after day at the mailbox for Chris's letter, which never comes. Eventually, Edie realizes Chris will never write and marries the mailman, who believes that she waited by the mailbox for him every day, although Edie never tells him that she had waited for Chris because she likes "for people to think what pleases them and makes them happy."

== Adaptations ==
The short story was adapted as a play of the same name, and staged at the Blyth Festival. It was also adapted as part of the 1988 anthology film Martha, Ruth and Edie, alongside short stories by Cynthia Flood and Betty Lambert.
