= Sean Dixon (writer) =

Canadian playwright

Sean Dixon is a Canadian playwright. He is most noted for his 2014 stage play A God in Need of Help, which was a Governor General's Award nominee for English-language drama at the 2014 Governor General's Awards.

A 1988 graduate of the National Theatre School of Canada, Dixon began his career as an actor, and was a cofounder of the Winnipeg-based Primus theatre company in the late 1980s. His early plays included Dog Day (1989), Falling Back Home (1990) End of the World Romance (1991), 1492 (1992), District of Centuries (1995), Billy Nothin' (1999), and The Epic Period (2001).

He received Dora Mavor Moore Award nominations for Best Original Play, Independent Theatre in 1993 for 1492, and Best Original Play, General Theatre in 2014 for A God in Need of Help.

His subsequent plays have included The Wilberforce Hotel (2015) and The Orange Dot (2017).

He has also published two fantasy novels for young readers, The Feathered Cloak (2007) and The Winter Drey (2009), and the adult novels The Girls Who Saw Everything (2007) The Many Revenges of Kip Flynn (2011) and The Abduction of Seven Forgers (2023).

He lives in Toronto, Ontario, and is married to documentary filmmaker Katerina Cizek.
