= Paul Thompson (playwright) =

Canadian playwright and theatre director

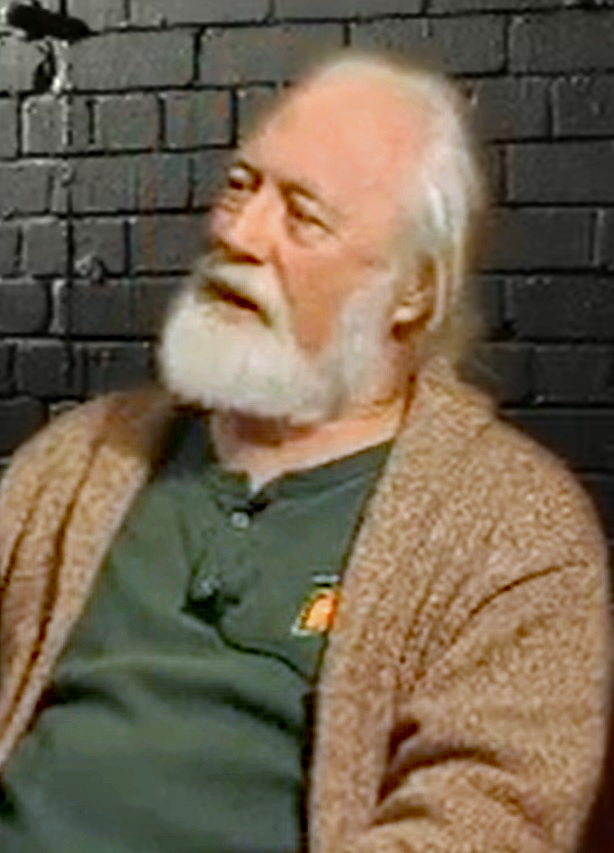
Paul Thompson in 2007

Paul Thompson O.C. (born May 4, 1940 in Charlottetown, Prince Edward Island) is a Canadian playwright and theatre director. Best known for his term as artistic director of Theatre Passe Muraille in Toronto, Ontario from 1970 to 1982, Thompson was known for pioneering techniques of collective creation, in which actors, playwrights and directors would collaborate on the creation of a play through field research and acting improvisations. Plays on which Thompson was credited as a primary or collaborating writer during this era included Doukhobors (1970), The Farm Show (1972), 1837: The Farmers' Revolt (1973, with Rick Salutin), I Love You, Baby Blue (1975), Far As the Eye Can See (1977, with Rudy Wiebe) and Maggie and Pierre (1980, with Linda Griffiths).

Thompson later served as director general of the National Theatre School in Montreal, Quebec from 1987 to 1994. He continues to direct theatre productions for Theatre Passe Muraille, Centaur Theatre, Alberta Theatre Projects, the Blyth Festival, Native Earth Performing Arts and De-ba-jeh-mu-jig Theatre Group.

Thompson was appointed an Officer of the Order of Canada in 2008, for his "profound influence on Canadian theatre."

Thompson was granted an honorary doctorate by Algoma University in 2017.

He is married to actress Anne Anglin.
