= Alfred Silver =

Canadian novelist and playwright

Alfred Silver is a Canadian novelist and playwright. He grew up in the Canadian Prairies and now lives in Nova Scotia.

His novel Acadia won the 1997 Thomas Head Raddall Award.

Several of his radio plays have been aired by CBC Radio, including Göttingen (Sunday Showcase), Rebel Angels of Song (Definitely Not the Opera) and Clean Sweep (The Mystery Project), which was nominated for the 1998 Top Ten Award of the Writers Guild of Canada.

== Works ==
- A Place Out of Time. Great Plains Fiction, 2007.
- Clean Sweep. Pottersfield Press, 2004.
- Eulalie La Tour: Acadie 1755. Trait d'union, 2004.
- Acadia: A Novel. Pottersfield Press, 2004.
- Three Hills Home. Nimbus Publishing, 2002.
- The Haunting of Maddie Prue. Great Plains Publications, 2000.
- Acadia. Ballantine/Random House, 1997. Winner of the 1997 Thomas Head Raddall Award.
- Keepers of the Dawn. Ballantine/Random House, 1995.
- Where the Ghost Horse Runs. Ballantine/Random House, 1991.
- Lord of the Plains. Ballantine/Random House, 1990.
- Red River Story. Ballantine/Random House, 1988.
- A Savage Place. Ballantine/Random House, 1983.
- Good Time Charlie's Back in Town Again. Avon, 1978.
