= David Bolt (novelist) =

English novelist and literary agent

David Michael Langstone Bolt (Harrow, 30 November 1927 – 16 November 2012) was an English novelist and literary agent. He was educated at Dulwich College, served with 10th Gurkha Rifles and as superintendent in the Malayan Police, 1948–50.

== Works ==
- The Albatross, 1954
- A Cry Ascending 1955
- Adam 1960
- The Man who Did 1963
- Samson 1979
- Gurkhas, non fiction 1967
- The Moon Princess, for children 1970
- An Authors' Handbook, non-fiction
- Of Heaven & Hope, religious 1965
