= Anne Chislett =

Canadian playwright

- Born: Margaret Anne Chislett; December 22, 1942 (age 83); St. John's, Dominion of Newfoundland
- Occupation: playwright
- Writing career
- Period: 1970s–present
- Notable works: Quiet in the Land, The Tomorrow Box

Anne Chislett (born December 22, 1942) is a Canadian playwright.

== Biography ==
Born and raised in St. John's, Dominion of Newfoundland, Chislett studied at Memorial University of Newfoundland and the University of British Columbia. She taught high school English and drama in Ontario before becoming a full-time playwright in 1980. Chislett is a co-founder of the Blyth Festival and was its artistic director from 1998 to 2002.

Among her most famous pieces are The Tomorrow Box (1980) and Quiet in the Land (1981). Quiet in the Land won both the Governor General's Award for Drama and the Chalmers Canadian Play Award in 1983. Her 1996 play Flippin' In won the Chalmers Canadian Play Award for Young Audiences. 2000's Not Quite the Same was nominated for both Dora Mavor Moore and Chalmers awards. Her works Yankee Notions and Venus Sucked In: A Post-Feminist Comedy were performed on the CBC Radio program Morningside.

Chislett is on the advisory board of the Playwrights Guild of Canada.

== Bibliography ==
(Note: dates are of first productions)

- A Summer Burning (adapted from Harry J. Boyle's novel) (1977)
- The Tomorrow Box (1980)
- Quiet in the Land (1981)
- Another Season's Promise (with Keith Roulston) (1986)
- Half a Chance (1988)
- The Gift (1988)
- Yankee Notions (1992)
- Glengarry School Days (with Janet Amos) (1994)
- Flippin' In (1995)
- Then and Now (1997)
- Not Quite the Same (2000)
- Venus Sucked In: A Post-Feminist Comedy (radio play) (1991)
- No Sweat (2005)
- Another Season's Harvest (with Keith Roulston) (2006)
- The Perilous Pirate's Daughter (with David Archibald) (2007)
