= The Third Bank of the River (short story) =

"The Third Bank of the River" is a short story written by João Guimarães Rosa, published in his book Primeiras Estórias (First Stories), in 1962.

It is narrated in first person by the son of a man who decides to leave the family and the whole society to live within a small [canoe] in a huge river.

Guimarães Rosa uses several expressions and culture facts of specific regions of Brazil (which is known as regionalism in the literature), but the tale is however universal, dealing with great dilemmas of human existence. It is written in poetic prose and has sentences that play with specific orality of Brazilian Portuguese.

== Criticism and interpretations ==
=== Alienation ===
In an article from February 1966 about the short stories of the book "First Stories" and the general work of Guimarães Rosa, Paulo Rónai concludes that "The third bank of the river" deals with the alienation that is "accepted as a painful part of life's routine when it is gradually declared." The narrator of the tale starts to infect himself with the dementia of his father.

=== Orality ===
About orality, Rónai observes that the tales of "First Stories" use idioms that we are accustomed to hear in the mouths of people and that, in their fruity vigor, give delicious flavor and energy to the popular speech. He uses as examples the following sentences extracted from this short story: "Nosso pai nada não dizia.", "Do que eu mesmo me alembro", "Nossa casa, no tempo, ainda era mais próxima do rio, obra de nem quarto de légua", "perto e longe de sua família dele", "avisado que nem Noé".

Rosa, therefore, would not be a writer who merely reproduces popular language, as he uses neologisms and idioms in a way that, for Rónai, is "so provocatively original".

=== Neologisms ===
As stated earlier, Rosa not only portrays a popular and peasant speech, but also invents new words and terms in his texts. On "The third bank of the river", the neologism "diluso" is a possible variant of "diluto" or "diluído" (diluted, dissolved).

== Influence ==
=== Popular music ===
The song "The third bank of the river", with music by Milton Nascimento and lyrics by Caetano Veloso, was composed in 1991, explicitly from the eponymous tale of Guimarães Rosa. The song is ninth track of the album Circuladô (1991), by Caetano Veloso.

== Adaptations ==
=== Cinema ===
- This tale was adapted to the cinema in a French-Brazilian film of 1994 named The Third Bank of the River and directed by Nelson Pereira dos Santos.

=== Radio ===
- An adaptation was also made for radio with an episode titled The Third Bank of the River airing in 1985 as part of the Vanishing Point series.

== Bibliography ==
- RONAI, Paulo. "Os vastos espaços" (escrito em 1966). in: Primeiras Estórias. Rio de Janeiro: Editora Nova Fronteira, 2001.
- ROSA, Vilma Guimarães Rosa. Relembramentos. Nova Fronteira, 2014 [1983].
- SANTANA, Ana Glécia Ramos de. "O estudo da literatura na contemporaneidade: como a poética é realizada nas canções". Camaçari: Universidade Federal da Paraíba, 2013. Available online here.
