= Rachel Wyatt =

English-Canadian dramatist (1929–2024)

Rachel Wyatt CM (14 October 1929 – 7 July 2024) was an English-Canadian dramatist, originally from Bradford, England.

Wyatt emigrated to Canada with her family in 1957. She wrote scores of plays for the BBC and Canadian Broadcasting Corporation. Wyatt was appointed a member of the Order of Canada in 2002 and awarded the Queen's Golden Jubilee Medal in 2003. Wyatt died on 7 July 2024, at the age of 94.

== Novels ==
- The String Box (1970)
- The Rosedale Hoax (1977) ISBN 978-0887840616
- Foreign Bodies (1982) ISBN 978-0887840920
- Time in the Air (1985) ISBN 978-0887841460
- Mona Lisa Smiled a Little (1999) ISBN 978-0889821804
- Time's Reach (2003) ISBN 978-0889822054

== Short story collections ==
- The Day Marlene Dietrich Died (1996) ISBN 978-0889821613
- The Last We Heard of Leonard (2004) ISBN 978-0889822108
- The Magician's Beautiful Assistant (2005) ISBN 978-0973688221

== Biographies ==
- Agnes Macphail (2000) Dundurn Press ISBN 978-0968360156

== Sources ==
- Bloomsbury Guide to Women's Literature
