= Cordelia Strube =

Canadian playwright and novelist

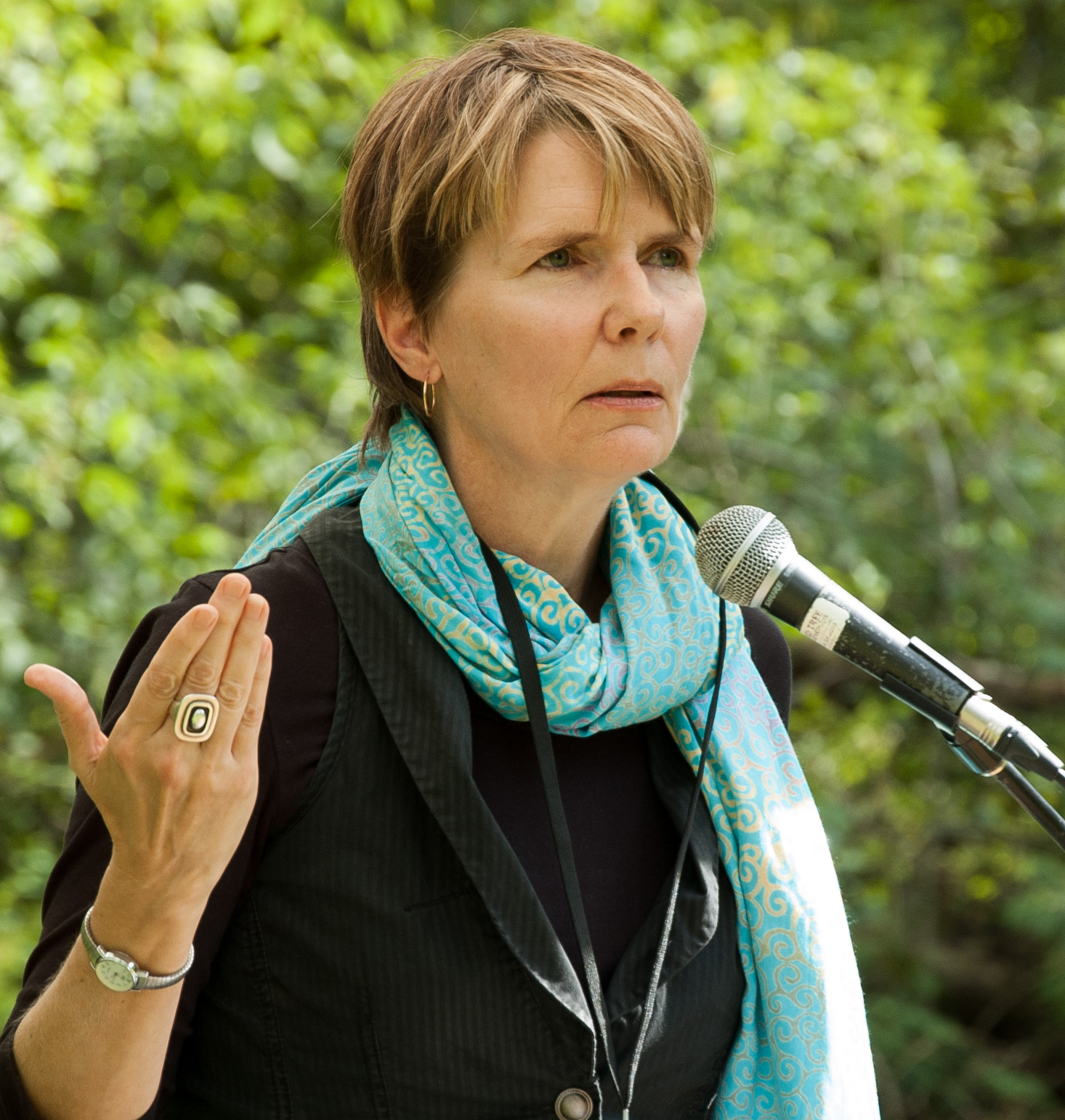
- Strube at the Eden Mills Writers' Festival in 2016
- Born: 1960 (age 65–66); Montreal, Quebec, Canada
- Occupations: Novelist; playwright
- Website: cordeliastrube.weebly.com

Cordelia Strube (born 1960) is a Canadian playwright and novelist.

Raised in Montreal, Quebec, Strube began her career as an actor. After winning a CBC Literary Prize for her first radio play, Mortal, she wrote nine more radio plays for CBC Radio before publishing her debut novel, Alex & Zee, in 1994. The novel was a nominee for the Books in Canada First Novel Award.

Her third novel, Teaching Pigs to Sing, was a nominee for the English-language fiction category of the 1996 Governor General's Awards. Her novel Lemon was longlisted for the 2010 Scotiabank Giller Prize and shortlisted for the 2010 Trillium Book Award. In 2016, she won the Toronto Book Award for On the Shores of Darkness, There Is Light.

At Sea in a Sieve was longlisted for the 2026 Giller Prize.

== Works ==
=== Novels ===
- Alex & Zee (1994)
- Milton's Elements (1995)
- Teaching Pigs to Sing (1996)
- Dr. Kalbfleisch and the Chicken Restaurant (1997)
- The Barking Dog (2000)
- Blind Night (2004)
- Planet Reese (2007)
- Lemon (2009)
- Milosz (2012)
- On the Shores of Darkness, There Is Light (2016)
- Misconduct of the Heart (2020)
- At Sea in a Sieve (2026)

=== Plays ===
- Fine (1985)
- Mortal (1986)
- Shape (1987)
- Scar Tissue (1987)
- Attached (1988)
- Caught in the Intersection (1988)
- Marshmallow (1988)
- Mid-Air (1989)
- Absconder (1989)
- On the Beach (1989)
- Past Due (1989)
