= David Widdicombe (filmmaker) =

Canadian filmmaker and playwright

David Widdicombe (27 May 1962 – 10 July 2017) was a Canadian filmmaker and playwright. His most successful work is Santa Baby (2006), which he directed and wrote.

Widdicombe was born in Toronto, Ontario. He was a graduate of the Canadian Film Centre and has been nominated for the Norman Jewison Award for Directing. He was also playwright-in-residence at Toronto's Factory Theatre.

Widdicombe's stage plays include The River Lady (winner of the National Playwrighting Competition), Dinosaur Dreams, Swamp Baby & Other Tales, and Wake (named one of the top ten plays at the 2000 Edinburgh Festival Fringe).

In 2001, his play Science Fiction won the Aurora Award and was nominated for four Dora Mavor Moore Awards including Outstanding New Play.

Santa Baby won Best Film Comedy at the 2006 Los Angeles International Short Film Festival and was named Best Screenplay at the CFC Worldwide Short Film Festival in Toronto.
