= Theatre New Brunswick =

Theatre New Brunswick is the only English language professional theatre company in New Brunswick, Canada. It began operation in 1968, and has been successfully operating since that time, focusing on highlighting professional and emerging Maritime and New Brunswick artists. Each year, TNB tours a season of professional productions throughout New Brunswick and Nova Scotia. The TNB Young Company focuses on making live theatre accessible by touring productions with educational themes to New Brunswick schools in rural areas. The TNB Theatre School operates year-round and trains hundreds of youth in areas such as Theatre Leadership, Playwriting, Acting, and Musical Theatre.

== Artistic directors ==
- Walter Learning (1968-1978)
- Malcolm Black (1978-1984)
- Janet Amos (1984-1988)
- Sharon Pollock (1988-1990)
- Michael Shamata (1990-1995)
- Walter Learning (1995-1999)
- David Sherrin (1999-2003)
- Scott Burke (2003-2005)
- Claude Giroux (2005-2006)
- Leigh Rivenbark (2006-2009)
- Caleb Marshall (2009–2014)
- Thomas Morgan Jones (2015-2018)
- Natasha MacLellan (2018–present)

== Recent Productions ==
- Heroine - by Karen Bassett
- The Greatest Play in the History of the World - by Ian Kershaw
- O'Brien - by Thomas Hodd
- Greetings - by Don Hannah
- Bluebirds - by Vern Thiessen
- Songs From Finding Wolastoq Voice - by Samaqani Cocahq
- Wood Buffalo - by Len Frankenstein
- Becca - by Melanie Léger
