= Colleen Curran =

Colleen Curran is a Quebec playwright, novelist, teacher and actor who has written more than 20 plays that have been staged across Canada, the United States and Australia. Her three comedic novels about a singing waitress are titled Something Drastic, Overnight Sensation and Guests of Chance.
