= Blyth Festival =

Blyth Festival, is a theatrical festival, located in the village of Blyth, Ontario, Canada, which specializes in the production and promotion of Canadian plays.

In addition, the Festival acts as a resource for local groups and makes its facilities available for community use. The Festival and the Centre contribute significantly to the economy of the village and to the tourism industry in Huron County.

== History ==
The organization was started by James Roy, playwright Anne Chislett and local newspaper editor Keith Roulston in 1975. Its primary mandate was to produce and develop local Canadian plays.

In 1975, few scripts that fit the festival's mandate were being written, so the festival's founders began to create new works and adapt the work of other Canadian playwrights. The first season included a play with an established reputation, Agatha Christie's The Mousetrap, but the popularity of the Canadian-written offering, Harry J. Boyle's Mostly in Clover, encouraged the founders to focus on plays with local content. The Blyth Memorial Community Hall had an upstairs auditorium which had been little used for decades; this was refurbished to provide a venue for the festival. At that time, the Festival was the only summer theatre producing original Canadian plays. The Blyth Festival's archives are stored at the University of Guelph.

One of the festival's most financially successful plays was Beverley Cooper's Innocence Lost: A Play About Stephen Truscott, staged in 2008.

By 2014, the festival had premiered 120 original plays, including Alice Munro's How I Met My Husband, and the Governor General Award-winning Quiet in the Land, by Anne Chislett. In 2017, Blyth Festival's original production, Pigeon King, was chosen to be restaged in Ottawa as part of the National Arts Centre's 2018-2019 season.

== Blyth Centre for the Arts ==
After the founding of Blyth Festival, Memorial Hall grew into a year-round centre of cultural activity for Huron County and southwestern Ontario. In addition to the Festival, the Centre includes an Art Gallery that showcases three professional exhibits, one non-juried community show and co-ordinates a student exhibit each season. A choir, the Blyth Festival singers, and the Blyth Festival Orchestra perform regularly. The theatre provides a venue for musical, theatrical and other special events during the off-season.

In addition, the Festival acts as a resource for local groups and makes its facilities available for community use. The Festival and the Centre contribute significantly to the economy of the village and to the tourism industry in Huron County.

== Artistic directors ==
- James Roy (1975-1979)
- Janet Amos (1979–1984)
- Katherine Kaszas (1984–1991)
- Peter Smith (1991–1994)
- Janet Amos (1994–1997)
- Anne Chislett (1997–2003)
- Eric Coates (2003–2013)
- Peter Smith (Interim 2013)
- Marion de Vries (2014)
- Gil Garratt (2014-present)
