= List of Canadian films of 1991 =

This is a list of Canadian films which were released in 1991:

Title	Director	Cast	Genre	Notes
The Adjuster	Atom Egoyan	Elias Koteas, Arsinée Khanjian, Maury Chaykin	Drama	Best Canadian Feature at TIFF, entered into Moscow
Angel Square	Anne Wheeler	Ned Beatty, Nicola Cavendish, Jeremy Raddick, Guillaume Lemay-Thivierge	Family film	Genie Awards – Overall Sound, Sound Editing, Song; based on the novel by Brian Doyle
The Apprentice (L'Apprenti)	Richard Condie	Harvey Atkin	Animated short	
Black Robe	Bruce Beresford	Lothaire Bluteau, Aden Young, Sandrine Holt, August Schellenberg, Harrison Liu	Historical drama	Canada-Australia co-production based on the novel by Brian Moore.
Blackfly	Christopher Hinton	Wade Hemsworth (song)	National Film Board animated short	Academy Award nominee
Blood Clan	Chris Wilkinson	Gordon Pinsent, Michelle Little, Robert Wisden, Anne Mansfield	Drama	
Bordertown Café	Norma Bailey	Janet Wright, Gordon Michael Woolvett, Nicholas Campbell, Susan Hogan	Drama	Genie for Best Actress
Chaindance	Allan Goldstein	Michael Ironside, Rae Dawn Chong, Brad Dourif, Bruce Glover, Ken Pogue	Prison drama	
Clearcut	Ryszard Bugajski	Graham Greene, Floyd Red Crow Westerman, Tom Jackson	Drama	
The Dance Goes On	Paul Almond	James Keach, Matthew Almond, Geneviève Bujold	Drama	
Deadly Currents	Simcha Jacobovici		Documentary	Genie Award - Feature Documentary
Diplomatic Immunity	Sturla Gunnarsson	Wendel Meldrum, Ofelia Medina, Michael Hogan, Michael Riley	Drama	
The Events Leading Up to My Death	Bill Robertson	John Allore, Peter MacNeill, Rosemary Radcliffe, Linda Kash, Maria Del Mar, Karen Hines, Mary Margaret O'Hara	Comedy	
Every Dog's Guide to the Playground	Les Drew	Paul Brown, Harvey Atkin, Luba Goy	Animated short	
The Fabulous Voyage of the Angel (Le fabuleux voyage de l'ange)	Jean Pierre Lefebvre	Daniel Lavoie, Marcel Sabourin	Fantasy	
The Falls	Kevin McMahon		Documentary	
Fearless Tiger	Ron Hulme	Jalal Merhi, Bolo Yeung, Monika Schnarre	Kung-Fu film	Direct to DVD
Four Stiffs and a Trombone (L'assassin jouait du trombone)	Roger Cantin	Germain Houde, Marc Labrèche, Raymond Bouchard, France Castel	Comedy	
The Grocer's Wife	John Pozer	Simon Webb, Andrea Rankin, Nicola Cavendish	Comedy	Genie Award – Supporting Actor (Cavendish), Claude Jutra Award Inaugural Claude Jutra Award for best feature film by a first-time director
Highway 61	Bruce McDonald	Valerie Buhagiar, Don McKellar, Earl Pastko, Art Bergmann, Tracy Wright, Jello Biafra	Drama	
Joseph K.: The Numbered Man (Joseph K, l'homme numéroté)	Gilles Blais	Paul Savoie	Docudrama	
Julia Has Two Lovers	Bashar Shbib	Daphna Kastner, David Duchovny, David Charles	Drama	Made with U.S. financing
Kumar and Mr. Jones	Sugith Varughese	John Gilbert, Ivan Smith, Michelle Duquette, Diego Matamoros	Short drama	
The Legend of Kootenai Brown	Allan Kroeker	Tom Burlinson, Donnelly Rhodes, Michelle Thrush, John Pyper-Ferguson, Raymond Burr	Western	
Letters of Transit (Les Sauf-conduits)	Manon Briand	Julie Laverge, Patrick Coyette, Yves Pelletier, Luc Picard	Drama	TIFF – Best Canadian Short; Yorkton Film Festival – Best Film, Best Director
Love Crazy (Amoureux fou)	Robert Ménard	Rémy Girard, Nathalie Gascon, Jean Rochefort, Danielle Proulx	Comedy of manners	Genie Awards – Actor (Girard), Supporting Actress (Proulx)
Love Me (Love-moi)	Marcel Simard	Germain Houde, Paule Baillargeon, Lucie Laurier	Drama	
The Making of Monsters	John Greyson	Stewart Arnott, David Gardner, Taborah Johnson	Short	TIFF Best Canadian Short
Masala	Srinivas Krishna	Srinivas Krishna, Saeed Jaffrey, Sakina Jaffrey, Zohra Sehgal	Drama	
Montreal Stories (Montréal vu par...)	Denys Arcand, Michel Brault, Atom Egoyan, Jacques Leduc, Léa Pool, Patricia Rozema		Drama anthology	Six short films made for the 350th anniversary of the founding of the city of Montreal
My Grandparents Had a Hotel	Karen Shopsowitz		National Film Board documentary	
Naked Lunch	David Cronenberg	Peter Weller, Judy Davis, Ian Holm, Julian Sands, Monique Mercure, Roy Scheider	Adapted from the novel by William S. Burroughs	Canada-U.K.-Japan co-production
Nelligan	Robert Favreau	Michel Comeau	Drama	Biopic of poet Émile Nelligan
No Skin Off My Ass	Bruce LaBruce	G. B. Jones, Bruce LaBruce, Klaus von Brücker, Caroline Azar, Beverly Breckenridge	Comedy-drama	
On My Own	Antonio Tibaldi	Judy Davis, Matthew Ferguson, David McIlwrath		Canada-Italy-Australia co-production
The Pianist	Claude Gagnon	Macha Grenon, Gail Travers	Drama	
The Quarrel	Eli Cohen	Saul Rubinek, R.H. Thomson	Drama	
RSVP	Laurie Lynd	Daniel MacIvor	Short drama	
Saeed	Mehra Meh		Short drama	
Sam and Me	Deepa Mehta	Ranjit Chowdhry, Peter Boretski, Om Puri	Drama	Deepa Mehta's first feature
The Savage Woman (La Demoiselle sauvage)	Léa Pool	Patricia Tulasne, Matthias Habich, Roger Jendly, Michel Voïta	Drama	Canada-Switzerland co-production
Scanners II: The New Order	Christian Duguay	David Hewlett, Deborah Raffin, Yvan Ponton	Horror	
Shadows of the Past	Gabriel Pelletier	Nicholas Campbell, Erika Anderson	Thriller	Made-for-TV
Ski School	Damian Lee	Dean Cameron	Comedy	
Solitaire	Francis Damberger	Paul Coeur, Valerie Pearson, Michael Hogan	Drama	
A Song for Tibet	Anne Henderson		National Film Board documentary	Best Short Documentary, Genie Awards
South of Wawa	Robert Boyd	Rebecca Jenkins, Scott Renderer, Andrew Miller	Comedy, drama	
Stereotypes (Stéréotypes)	Jean-Marc Vallée	André Robitaille, France Parent, Martine Francke	Short drama	
Stones at the Max	Julien Temple	The Rolling Stones	Shot during The Rolling Stones’ 1990 Steel Wheels tour	Canada-Ireland co-production made with U.S. financing; first rock concert filmed in IMAX
Strings	Wendy Tilby		National Film Board animated short	Academy Award nominee; Genie Award - Animated Short
True Confections	Gail Singer	Leslie Hope, Chandra West, Judah Katz, Daniel Kash	Comedy-drama	
Two Sisters	Caroline Leaf		National Film Board animated short	Drawn on film animation
White Light	Al Waxman	Martin Kove, Martha Henry, Allison Hossack	Drama	
Wisecracks	Gail Singer		Documentary	
Xénofolies	Michel Moreau		Short documentary	

== See also ==
- 1991 in Canada
- 1991 in Canadian television
