= Miss America (Mary Margaret O'Hara album) =

Studio album by Mary Margaret O'Hara
- Released: 1988
- Recorded: 1983–1988
- Studio: Rockfield (Monmouth); Phase One (Toronto); Comfort Sound (Toronto)
- Genre: Rock
- Length: 44:44
- Label: Virgin
- Producer: Mary Margaret O'Hara; Michael Brook

Mary Margaret O'Hara chronology
Miss America (1988)	Christmas EP (1991)

Singles from Miss America
- 1. "Body's in Trouble" Released: February 1989; 2. "Anew Day" Released: 1989

Miss America is the debut album by Canadian singer-songwriter Mary Margaret O'Hara, released in 1988 by Virgin Records.

It is O'Hara's only full-length studio album released to date. All of her other releases have been EPs, soundtrack albums or collaborations with other artists.

== Recording ==
Following the disbandment of her band Go Deo Chorus the previous year, Mary Margaret O'Hara signed a recording contract with British label Virgin Records in 1984 on the strength of demo material of hers that had been sent to the label by a friend. Virgin allowed O'Hara complete creative control over her debut album, but insisted that she record the album with an established producer, despite her desire to produce or co-produce the album herself. Andy Partridge, of fellow Virgin act XTC, and John Leckie were hired to produce, and recording sessions at Rockfield Studios in Monmouth, Wales took place in November 1984. However, Partridge and Leckie, having found themselves at odds with O'Hara and her backing band over the course of recording, were ultimately fired from the project; in their place, Joe Boyd was hired by Virgin to oversee the sessions. 14 songs were recorded by the end of the year. O'Hara and her band then returned to Canada, where additional overdubbing and remixing was undertaken in Toronto, at Phase One Studios.

Meanwhile, Virgin, as O'Hara later recalled, had begun to express apprehensions about the record altogether. Dissatisfied with the finished material, the label refused to release the album. Work on the album was resumed and completed in 1988, after Michael Brook contacted Virgin expressing interest in assisting O'Hara with its production. At the Toronto studio Comfort Sound, O'Hara and Brook reworked songs from the original Rockfield sessions for final release, with six being remixed and four ("Year in Song", "Dear Darling", "My Friends Have", and "Help Me Lift You Up") being re-recorded. Another track ("Body's in Trouble") was remixed by Kevin Killen at Windmill Lane Studios in Dublin from a 1983 recording from an earlier Phase One Studios session. O'Hara said in 2008 of her experience making Miss America: "I loved the Celtic crosses and the sheep rolling around the hills by the studio in Wales. But for Virgin to go from, 'You can do whatever you want', to 'What have you done?'—that was tough."

== Composition ==
O'Hara selected the title Miss America for the album because she found its contents "so much unlike what those two words together said". In Now, Kim Hughes noted the album's minimalist production and varied musical styles, comparing its "acoustic guitar sound and liberal use of lap steel" to the country genre, while also finding that the "slinky bass lines and cool piano" of certain tracks "evoke a smokey jazz feel". According to Hughes, the songs on Miss America are characterized by O'Hara's "inimitably high-pitched, breathy and erratic ... high and low, brittle and soothing" vocals, as well as "her ethereal, often ambiguous lyrics".

== Release ==
Miss America was released by Virgin in 1988. It made little commercial impact, failing to chart. Nonetheless, positive press coverage of the album encouraged the label to issue "Body's in Trouble" as a single in February 1989, with an accompanying music video for the song also being produced. A second single, "Anew Day", was released later in 1989. O'Hara spent the year following the release of Miss America touring. The album was reissued by Koch Records on August 13, 1996.

== Critical reception and legacy ==
Professional ratings
Review scores
Source	Rating
AllMusic	4.5/5 stars
NME	8/10
Pitchfork	8.5/10

Miss America was acclaimed by music critics at the time of its release, particularly in the United Kingdom and O'Hara's native Canada. The Globe and Mail's Chris Dafoe stated that "O'Hara's vocals are all over the place, by turns incantatory, melancholy, slinky and delicate, while the music flirts with country, jazz and pop without ever committing seriously to any one style." In the Toronto Star, Greg Quill called the album "a compelling work, evocative, provocative and in places astonishingly pure and beautiful."

Chris Roberts of Melody Maker highlighted how the album's songs explore themes of love while also avoiding "conventional love song" structures, commenting, "Rarely has the language of popular song been so delicately and deftly subverted. Mary Margaret O'Hara has re-invented sincerity." At the end of 1988, the magazine named Miss America the year's 21st best album. NME reviewer Stuart Bailie compared O'Hara favorably to Van Morrison and Patti Smith in that O'Hara "has a flighty talent that allows her to transcend whatever genre she's messing with, and the presence to dispense with the usual verse/chorus stuff when the notion takes her."

In a retrospective review for AllMusic, Jason Ankeny stated that "Miss America still sounds light years ahead of its time: Mary Margaret O'Hara is a force of nature, a remarkable singer and composer whose crystal-clear soprano acrobatics and hypnotic songs defy accepted conventions." Writing for Pitchfork in 2018, Laura Snapes opined that it ranks alongside "David Lynch's Blue Velvet, Tom Waits' Swordfishtrombones, and Leonard Cohen's I'm Your Man" as one of the 1980s' "jarring noir masterpieces". Miss America was included at number 32 in NME's 1993 list of the greatest albums of the 1980s, and at number 88 in Mojo's 1995 list of the greatest albums of all time. The Guardian listed it in 2007 as one of "1000 Albums to Hear Before You Die". In his 2007 book The Top 100 Canadian Albums, journalist Bob Mersereau ranked Miss America 32nd. The album was the 2016 recipient of the jury-voted Slaight Family Polaris Heritage Prize—awarded annually by the Polaris Music Prize organization to honor Canadian albums released before that prize's debut—in the 1986–1995 category.

Fellow musicians have praised Miss America. Morrissey, on whose 1990 songs "November Spawned a Monster" and "He Knows I'd Love to See Him" O'Hara provided additional vocals, said of the album: "I thought it so beautiful I suddenly realised I hadn't in a decade heard someone singing because of deep-set personal neurosis, absolute need and desperation." When Rolling Stone surveyed artists on their favorite albums of 1989, Miss America was cited by Cowboy Junkies' Margo Timmins, who ranked it number one on her list, and R.E.M.'s Michael Stipe. The members of Throwing Muses were fans of the record, according to the band's Tanya Donelly, who named it one of her all-time favorite albums. "You Will Be Loved Again" was covered both by Cowboy Junkies, on their 1990 album The Caution Horses, and by Donelly with the Parkington Sisters, on their 2020 self-titled album. Other artists who have covered songs from Miss America include This Mortal Coil ("Help Me Lift You Up"), the Walkabouts ("Dear Darling"), the Art of Time Ensemble and Sarah Slean ("To Cry About"), Devon Sproule and Perfume Genius (both of whom recorded versions of "Body's in Trouble"), and Bria Salmena ("When You Know Why You're Happy").

O'Hara followed Miss America in 1991 with the four-track, holiday-themed Christmas EP, which would be her only release of new material under her own name in the 1990s, apart from several tracks that she contributed to assorted compilations. In subsequent years, she primarily performed on recordings by other artists, while also pursuing non-musical endeavors such as acting, teaching, and graphic design. In 2000, O'Hara appeared in the film Apartment Hunting, for which she recorded an accompanying soundtrack album; issued in 2002, the soundtrack marked her first full-length album since Miss America 14 years earlier. O'Hara said in an interview after its release that as she felt the response to Miss America "was enough", she had not felt compelled to record a formal follow-up. In 2008, discussing her reluctance to begin work on another album, she remarked, "in some ways I think that if you have an idea, why do you have to make it?"

== Track listing ==
All songs written and arranged by Mary Margaret O'Hara.

1. "To Cry About" – 3:23
2. "Year in Song" – 3:34
3. "Body's in Trouble" – 4:58
4. "Dear Darling" – 3:51
5. "Anew Day" – 3:11
6. "When You Know Why You're Happy" – 4:34
7. "My Friends Have" – 3:10
8. "Help Me Lift You Up" – 4:35
9. "Keeping You in Mind" – 4:39
10. "Not Be Alright" – 5:13
11. "You Will Be Loved Again" – 3:36

== Personnel ==
Credits are adapted from the album's liner notes.

Musicians

- Mary Margaret O'Hara – vocals, arrangement
- Michael Brook – guitar (tracks 5, 6), Infinite guitar (track 1)
- Hugh Marsh – violin (tracks 3, 5, 9), DX7 log rhythm (track 10)
- Rusty McCarthy – guitar (tracks 1–3, 6, 7, 9, 10), acoustic guitar (track 4), electric guitar (track 8)
- Bruce Moffet – drums (track 3)
- David Piltch – Elias 5-string bass (tracks 1, 5, 6, 10), bass (track 9), string bass (track 11)
- Hendrik Riik – bass (tracks 2–4, 7), electric bass (track 8)
- Don Rooke – lap steel guitar (tracks 4, 6, 8), rhythm guitar (track 5), acoustic guitar (track 8)
- John Sheard – piano (tracks 5, 9)
- Michael Sloski – drums (tracks 2, 4–7, 9, 10)
- Bill Whelan – piano (track 3)

Production

- Mary Margaret O'Hara – production, mixing
- Michael Brook – production, mixing
- Rhonda Bruce – assistant engineering
- Evan Caulford – assistant engineering
- Paul Cobbold – recording
- Jody Colero – executive production
- Paul Gross – recording (track 3)
- Bill Kennedy – additional engineering
- Kevin Killen – mixing (track 3)
- Kevin Markland – assistant engineering
- Joe Primeau – recording
- Garth Richardson – additional engineering
- Richard Schiller – assistant engineering
- Randy Staub – additional engineering
- Stephen Traub – recording
- Mick Walsh – additional engineering

Design

- Mary Margaret O'Hara – artwork
- Heather Cameron – art direction, photography
- Don Rooke – art direction, photography
