= National Velvet (band) =

Canadian musical group

- Origin: Toronto, Ontario, Canada
- Genres: Goth rock, hard rock
- Years active: 1985–1995; 2003 (single performance); 2011–present
- Labels: Capitol, Iron Music, Intrepid Records
- Members: Maria Del Mar; Mark Crossley; Tim Welch; Mark Storm; Garry Flint; Darrell Flint; Mark Thwaite

National Velvet are a Canadian goth rock band, popular in the 1980s and 1990s. They took their name from the 1944 movie starring Elizabeth Taylor.

The band members have included vocalist Maria Del Mar, guitarist Mark Crossley, guitarist Mich Gzowski, drummer Ken Sinclair, guitarist Tim Welch, bassist Mark Storm (born Mark Erickson), saxophonist Chris Reis, and drummer Garry Flint.

The band came together after a chance meeting between Del Mar and Storm in an alley during a party in Toronto, Ontario; that initial meeting was actually an argument about musical taste, because Storm was a fan of gothic rock bands such as Bauhaus, while Del Mar was into Spanish classical music, Motown, swing music, and punk rock. Mark introduced Maria to some friends that were looking to start a band. Maria Del Mar worked the coat check at Toronto nightclub The Diamond, while Tim Welch was the lighting technician there. They began playing the local Toronto circuit, they used the money they made to record a 4-track demo. They shopped the demos around to record labels, but grew impatient. Six months after forming, they released a self-titled independent EP, which they sold at their shows. Their EP caught the attention of Capitol Records President, Dean Cameron. He was impressed and signed them to Capital affiliate Intrepid Records in 1987. Original members, Sinclair, Gzowski, and Reis had left the band prior to the Capitol deal and Gary Flint was added.

Their self-titled debut album was released in 1988, and spawned the radio single "Flesh Under Skin". In 1989, their single and video for "68 Hours" garnered them a CASBY Award. "Pacifist At Risk" and "Change My Mind" were also released as singles but failed to make the charts.

Their follow-up album, Courage was recorded in England with producer Zeus B. Held, and was released in 1990. Guitarist Tim Welch (formerly of Images In Vogue) was added as a full time band member. The album was supported by a cross-Canada tour, and gave the band further radio airplay for the singles "Shine On" and "Sex Gorilla". (The latter title was a band in-joke. The song had actually been written as "Sarsparilla", but the fans kept misunderstanding the lyrics, so the band relented and retitled the song.) "Sex Gorilla" also led to a fan tradition of throwing bananas at the stage during their shows. "Sex Gorilla" and "Shine On" were played in heavy rotation on Much Music and MTV. Courage was certified gold. A third single, "A Place Called Hysteria" was released off the album but received little push from the record label. The band continued to tour for the next few years, mainly in smaller clubs around Ontario, Canada.

The band subsequently left Capitol Records, and released their third and final album Wildseed in 1995 on the independent label Iron Music. The album was recorded at eNVy Studio and produced by Gary Flint. Guitarist Darrell Flint was added, replacing Mark Storm. The album received little attention and almost no airplay.

In 1996, Maria Del Mar joined the all female band Hassenpfeffer and recorded an album Songs of Convenience (MaGaDa International).

Despite frequent confusion, Del Mar is not the same person as television actress Maria del Mar. To further confusion, Maria Del Mar (singer) has done some acting, including the 1991 Toronto indie film The Events Leading Up to My Death, directed by Bill Robertson.

Maria continued to work in the Toronto music scene into the early 2000's, including gigs with Classic Albums Live and with the Rolling Stones tribute band Midnight Ramblers.

Storm was reported missing in November 2002. The following June, his body was found in Lake Ontario. The band got together in 2003 for a benefit concert to help Mark's family during the difficult time.

The band has performed periodically, including shows at Toronto's Bovine Sex Club in 2011 and 2012, and continue to perform at select venues.

== Discography ==
- National Velvet (EP, 1986)
- National Velvet (1988)
- Courage (1990)
- Wildseed (1995)

== See also ==
- Toronto goth scene
