= Irrelevant (disambiguation) =

Irrelevant is the quality of lacking relevance.

It may also refer to:

- Irrelevant, the Slik Toxik album
- Irrelevant, the Pink song
