= Hangin' In =

Canadian television sitcom

- Genre: Sitcom
- Created by: Jack Humphrey; Anna Sandor; Joseph Partington
- Starring: Lally Cadeau; David Eisner; Ruth Springford; Gina Wilkinson (season 5-7); Fiona Reid (season 7)
- Composer: Cliff Jones
- Country of origin: Canada
- Original language: English
- No. of seasons: 7
- No. of episodes: 110

Production
- Running time: 30 minutes
- Production company: Canadian Broadcasting Corporation

Original release
- Network: CBC
- Release: January 7, 1981 – February 23, 1987

Hangin' In is a Canadian television sitcom that aired on CBC from 1981 to 1987. It aired briefly on Nickelodeon and in syndication in the United States.

== Synopsis ==
The show starred Lally Cadeau as Kate Brown, the attractive and charismatic director of a youth drop-in centre in Toronto, and blended both comedy and drama in its portrayal of genuine teen counselling problems. David Eisner starred as Michael DiFalco, a young, affable staff counsellor, and Ruth Springford appeared as Doris Webster, the centre's receptionist. Many young Canadian actors, including Eric McCormack, Keanu Reeves, Jessica Steen and Mark Humphrey, made guest appearances as teenaged clients of the youth centre.

During the show's final season, Cadeau was replaced for the final five episodes by Fiona Reid as Maggie. This change was planned, as the producers were setting up a new spin-off series to star Reid as the director of a halfway house for young offenders. However, the new series was not picked up.

== Episodes ==
=== Season 1: 1981 ===
No. overall	No. in season	Title	Directed by	Written by	Original release date
1	1	"A Matter of Principale"	Unknown	Unknown	January 7, 1981
2	2	"Pressure Point"	Unknown	Unknown	January 14, 1981
3	3	"I Studied with Steinhauser"	Unknown	Unknown	January 21, 1981
4	4	"Second Chance"	Unknown	Unknown	January 28, 1981
5	5	"Real Pals"	Unknown	Unknown	February 4, 1981
6	6	"Freedom of Choice"	Unknown	Unknown	February 11, 1981
7	7	"Mothers and Dyads"	Unknown	Unknown	February 18, 1981
8	8	"Big Boys Don’t Cry"	Unknown	Unknown	February 25, 1981
9	9	"Nothing But Trouble"	Unknown	Unknown	March 4, 1981
10	10	"I'm Not a Marriage Counsellor"	Unknown	Unknown	March 18, 1981

=== Season 2: 1982 ===
No. overall	No. in season	Title	Directed by	Written by	Original release date
11	1	"I'm Okay, We're All Okay"	Unknown	Unknown	January 25, 1982
12	2	"I Left My Heart at the Ice Capades"	Alan Erlich	Leila Basen	February 1, 1982
13	3	"Movin' Out"	Unknown	Unknown	February 8, 1982
14	4	"Plasma Suite"	Unknown	Unknown	February 15, 1982
15	5	"Teacher's Pet"	Unknown	Unknown	February 22, 1982
16	6	"The Princess and the Pea"	Unknown	Unknown	March 1, 1982
17	7	"The Beefcake Boy"	Unknown	Unknown	March 8, 1982
18	8	"Make Room for Mommy"	Unknown	Unknown	March 15, 1982
19	9	"Days of Wine and Rabbis"	Unknown	Unknown	March 22, 1982
20	10	"The Man of the House"	Unknown	Unknown	March 29, 1982
21	11	"My Wheels Belong to Daddy"	Unknown	Unknown	April 5, 1982

=== Season 3: 1982–83 ===
No. overall	No. in season	Title	Directed by	Written by	Original release date
22	1	"The Reunion"	Unknown	Unknown	September 27, 1982
23	2	"Fun with Herb and Gloria"	Unknown	Unknown	October 4, 1982
24	3	"Model Daughter"	Unknown	Unknown	October 11, 1982
25	4	"Who's Sleeping in Your Bed?"	Unknown	Unknown	October 18, 1982
26	5	"Barnum and Baby"	Unknown	Unknown	October 25, 1982
27	6	"Joan Davis Remembered"	Unknown	Unknown	November 1, 1982
28	7	"Nobody's Wild About Harry"	Unknown	Unknown	November 8, 1982
29	8	"The Diary"	Unknown	Unknown	November 29, 1982
30	9	"A Man's Life"	Unknown	Unknown	December 6, 1982
31	10	"Christmas Wrapping"	Unknown	Unknown	December 20, 1982
32	11	"Great Expectations"	Unknown	Unknown	January 10, 1983
33	12	"Innocent Abroad"	Unknown	Unknown	January 17, 1983
34	13	"She Shoots, He Scores"	Unknown	Unknown	January 24, 1983
35	14	"The First Picture Show"	Unknown	Unknown	January 31, 1983
36	15	"The Talk Show"	Unknown	Unknown	February 7, 1983
37	16	"Video Fever"	Unknown	Unknown	February 14, 1983
38	17	"Love is Deaf"	Unknown	Unknown	February 21, 1983

=== Season 4: 1983–84 ===
No. overall	No. in season	Title	Directed by	Written by	Original release date
39	1	"I've Got a Secret"	Unknown	Unknown	September 26, 1983
40	2	"The Clock Show"	Unknown	Unknown	October 3, 1983
41	3	"Blood, Sweat and Tears"	Unknown	Unknown	October 17, 1983
42	4	"Prickly Heats"	Unknown	Unknown	October 31, 1983
43	5	"Our House Is Not Your Home"	Unknown	Unknown	November 7, 1983
44	6	"Lies My Sister Told Me"	Unknown	Unknown	November 14, 1983
45	7	"Trash 'n Fashion"	Unknown	Unknown	November 21, 1983
46	8	"The Actress and the Bishops"	Unknown	Unknown	November 28, 1983
47	9	"The Love Program"	Unknown	Unknown	December 5, 1983
48	10	"A Soft Touch"	Unknown	Unknown	December 12, 1983
49	11	"The Hero"	Unknown	Unknown	December 19, 1983
50	12	"Urban Core Kids"	Unknown	Unknown	January 2, 1984
51	13	"Happiness is a Warm Grover"	Unknown	Unknown	January 9, 1984
52	14	"Pack Up Your Troubles in Kate's Old Bag"	Unknown	Unknown	January 16, 1984
53	15	"Bridesmaid Revisited"	Unknown	Unknown	January 23, 1984
54	16	"The Icepick Cometh"	Unknown	Unknown	January 30, 1984
55	17	"Kissing Cousin"	Unknown	Unknown	February 6, 1984
56	18	"Windjammer"	Unknown	Unknown	February 13, 1984
57	19	"The Joint is Jumpin'"	Unknown	Unknown	February 20, 1984
58	20	"The Peace Pill"	Unknown	Unknown	February 27, 1984

=== Season 5: 1984–85 ===
No. overall	No. in season	Title	Directed by	Written by	Original release date
59	1	"Bahama Mama"	Unknown	Unknown	October 15, 1984
60	2	"Sparkling Spring Girl"	Unknown	Unknown	October 22, 1984
61	3	"Conflict of Interest"	Unknown	Unknown	October 29, 1984
62	4	"Everybody Loves a Baby"	Unknown	Unknown	November 5, 1984
63	5	"Oy Vey, Mike's Going Away"	Unknown	Unknown	November 12, 1984
64	6	"The Bells Are Ringing"	Unknown	Unknown	November 19, 1984
65	7	"Torn Between Two Lovers"	Unknown	Unknown	November 26, 1984
66	8	"Swan Song"	Unknown	Unknown	December 3, 1984
67	9	"The Party"	Unknown	Unknown	December 10, 1984
68	10	"Christmas Hotline"	Unknown	Unknown	December 24, 1984
69	11	"Okay, Blue Jays"	Unknown	Unknown	January 7, 1985
70	12	"Operation Grandad"	Unknown	Unknown	January 21, 1985
71	13	"Take One, They're Free"	Unknown	Unknown	January 28, 1985
72	14	"No Nukes Is Good Nukes"	Unknown	Unknown	February 4, 1985
73	15	"Dead Dogs Wag No Tails"	Unknown	Unknown	February 18, 1985
74	16	"Ain't Misbehavin'"	Unknown	Unknown	February 25, 1985
75	17	"Mike's Wedding"	Unknown	Unknown	March 4, 1985

=== Season 6: 1985–86 ===
No. overall	No. in season	Title	Directed by	Written by	Original release date
76	1	"You've Got a Friend"	Unknown	Unknown	September 30, 1985
77	2	"Sweet and Sour Hearts"	Unknown	Unknown	October 7, 1985
78	3	"The Travelling Saleswife"	Unknown	Unknown	October 21, 1985
79	4	"Heaven Can't Wait"	Unknown	Unknown	October 28, 1985
80	5	"The Dusty Queens"	Unknown	Unknown	November 11, 1985
81	6	"From Here to Maturity"	Unknown	Unknown	November 18, 1985
82	7	"My Biological Clock Is Ticking"	Unknown	Unknown	November 25, 1985
83	8	"A Mother's Work Is Never Done"	Unknown	Unknown	December 9, 1985
84	9	"Meeting of the Minds"	Unknown	Unknown	December 16, 1985
85	10	"Out of the Picture"	Unknown	Unknown	January 6, 1986
86	11	"Happy Birthday Sweet 16"	Unknown	Unknown	January 13, 1986
87	12	"Gigi's Home"	Unknown	Unknown	January 27, 1986
88	13	"Gimme a Sign"	Unknown	Unknown	February 3, 1986
89	14	"I Can't Help You But My Sister Can"	Unknown	Unknown	February 10, 1986
90	15	"Like Mother, Like Daughter"	Unknown	Unknown	February 17, 1986
91	16	"Divorce Counselor Style"	Unknown	Unknown	February 24, 1986
92	17	"The Bear I Never Knew"	Unknown	Unknown	March 2, 1986

=== Season 7: 1986–87 ===
No. overall	No. in season	Title	Directed by	Written by	Original release date
93	1	"Kate's TV Show"	Unknown	Unknown	September 29, 1986
94	2	"Deals on Wheels"	Unknown	Unknown	October 6, 1986
95	3	"Double Exposure"	Unknown	Unknown	October 13, 1986
96	4	"Hit Man Kate"	Unknown	Unknown	October 20, 1986
97	5	"Just Another Bonehead Move"	Unknown	Unknown	November 3, 1986
98	6	"Pride and Prejudice"	Unknown	Unknown	November 24, 1986
99	7	"Stop the Mugging"	Unknown	Unknown	December 1, 1986
100	8	"There Goes the Bride"	Unknown	Unknown	December 8, 1986
101	9	"Little House on the Highway"	Unknown	Unknown	December 22, 1986
102	10	"Writing on the Wall"	Unknown	Unknown	December 29, 1986
103	11	"Half-Way Home"	Unknown	Unknown	January 5, 1987
104	12	"Engagement in Thailand"	Unknown	Unknown	January 12, 1987
105	13	"Guilty Until Proven Innocent"	Unknown	Unknown	January 19, 1987
106	14	"Do You Take This Bunny?"	Unknown	Unknown	January 26, 1987
107	15	"Not All Black and White"	Unknown	Unknown	February 9, 1987
108	16	"Li'l Devil"	Unknown	Unknown	February 16, 1987
109	17	"Bye, Bye Birdie"	Unknown	Unknown	February 23, 1987

== Production ==
The show was created by the same production team, led by executive producer Jack Humphrey, with Anna Sandor and Joseph Partington, behind one of the most successful Canadian sitcoms in television history, King of Kensington, which had itself evolved in its late episodes toward a similar concept and setting.

The series premiered on January 7, 1981, the day after the final episode of the dramatic miniseries You've Come a Long Way, Katie, which also starred Cadeau. Writing for Maclean's, Bill MacVicar likened the streak of Cadeau's roles in two different series airing on four consecutive nights to "the video equivalent of being shot from a cannon or, at least, making a premiere entrance on a red carpet, with klieg lights and a ravenous crowd of autograph seekers".
