= What Are You Doing New Year's Eve? =

Song
- Published: 1947 by Famous Music
- Songwriter: Frank Loesser

"What Are You Doing New Year's Eve?" is a popular song written in 1947 by Frank Loesser as an independent song.

It was first recorded by Margaret Whiting in 1947 and first charted for The Orioles, peaking at No. 9 on Billboard's Best-Selling Retail Rhythm & Blues chart in December 1949. Other charted versions include Danté & The Evergreens (No. 107 on Billboard's Bubbling Under Hot 100 Singles in December 1960) and Nancy Wilson (No. 17 on Billboard's Christmas Singles chart in December 1965 and No. 24 on the same chart in December 1967).

Although it is typically performed in December, that was not the composer's intent. In A Most Remarkable Fella: Frank Loesser and the Guys and Dolls in His Life, his daughter Susan Loesser explains that "the singer, madly in love, is making a (possibly rash) commitment far into the future. ("Maybe it's much too early in the game. Ah, but I thought I'd ask you just the same – What are you doing New Year's, New Year's Eve?") It always annoyed my father when the song was sung during the holidays."

== Other recordings ==
The song has been recorded by many other artists, including:

- Ella Fitzgerald – Ella Wishes You a Swinging Christmas (1960)
- Ramsey Lewis – Sound of Christmas (1961)
- Nancy Wilson – Yesterday's Love Songs/Today's Blues (1963)
- Eydie Gormé – That Holiday Feeling with Steve Lawrence (1964)
- Lena Horne – Merry from Lena (1966)
- Lou Rawls – Merry Christmas Ho! Ho! Ho! (1967)
- Johnny Mathis – Give Me Your Love for Christmas (1969)
- Donny Osmond – Osmond Christmas Album (1976)
- The Carpenters – An Old-Fashioned Christmas (1984)
- Patti LaBelle – This Christmas (1990)
- Andy Williams – I Still Believe in Santa Claus (1990)
- Joe Williams – That Holiday Feelin' (1990)
- Vic Damone – All-Star Merry Christmas (1991)
- Mary Margaret O'Hara - Christmas EP (1991)
- Harry Connick Jr. – When My Heart Finds Christmas (1993)
- Boney James – Boney's Funky Christmas (1996)
- Beegie Adair – A Jazz Piano Christmas (1996)
- Barbra Streisand – Christmas Memories (2001)
- Barry Manilow – A Christmas Gift of Love (2002)
- Diana Krall – Christmas Songs (2005)
- Rufus Wainwright - The McGarrigle Christmas Hour (2005)
- Bette Midler – Cool Yule (2006)
- Katharine McPhee – Christmas Is the Time to Say I Love You (2010)
- Rod Stewart – Merry Christmas, Baby (2012
- Sykamore – promotional single (2020)
- Norah Jones – I Dream of Christmas (2021)
- Steve Perry – The Season (2021)
- Gregory Porter – Christmas Wish with Samara Joy (2023)
