= Christmas EP (Mary Margaret O'Hara EP) =

EP by Mary Margaret O'Hara
- Released: 1991
- Genre: Rock
- Length: 16:25
- Label: Virgin Records
- Producer: Mary Margaret O'Hara

Mary Margaret O'Hara chronology
Miss America (1988)	Christmas EP (1991)	Apartment Hunting (2001)

Mary Margaret O'Hara's Christmas EP was released in 1991. It contains three covers of classic Christmas standards, as well as an original Christmas-themed song written by O'Hara.

== Track listing ==
No.	Title	Length
1.	"Blue Christmas"	4:59
2.	"Silent Night"	3:57
3.	"What Are You Doing New Year's Eve?"	3:13
4.	"Christmas Evermore"	4:16
Total length:		16:25
