= Slik Toxik =

Canadian hard rock band

- Origin: Toronto, Ontario, Canada
- Genres: Hard rock, heavy metal
- Years active: 1988–1994
- Labels: Capitol, EMI, Strawberry (A&M/Polygram)
- Spinoffs: Raised On Mars
- Spinoff of: Portrait
- Past members: Nick Walsh; Rob Bruce; Kevin Gale; Adam Headland; Neal Busby; Pat Howarth; Alex Murno

Slik Toxik was a Canadian hard rock band formed in 1988 in Toronto. They released two albums.

== Biography ==
Slik Toxik was formed out of the Toronto hard rock band Portrait. Portrait consisted of original members singer/guitarist Nick Walsh, drummer Kevin Harrison, guitarist Kevin Gale, and bassist/ lyricist Dave Mercel. Portrait in its final incarnation was made up of Nick Walsh, guitarists Rob Bruce and Kevin Gale, bassist Frank Currell, and drummer Alex Munro. Former bassist and long time writing partner Dave Mercel remained as the band's lyricist.

Pat Howarth soon replaced Currell on bass as the band felt more akin to Howarth due to his musical style and also because he was already a friend from the neighborhood.

The band was brought to the attention of Drew Masters, who was a national music writer and manager for the band Succsexx. Drew thought that the band should change their name to have more attitude and impact to stand out from the bands that were currently playing on the scene. After adopting a new moniker Slik Toxik was then asked to be the support act for Succexx. It was at one of those gigs at the Siboney Club in Toronto's Kensington Market area that manager John Boyes saw the band performing. Shortly after that he courted them to sign a management deal with his brother's company Robert Luhtala Management.

The band started to demo some material that was to be produced by Bob Potter (Scorpions, Hawkwind, Marianne Faithfull) at Toronto's Comfort Sound and shopped by RLM to major labels. It was during these sessions that the band was told that they needed to get a different drummer for the studio who had more practical experience. That's when Neal Busby was brought in for the job. The band gave Alex Munro the opportunity to work harder and remain in the band, but being hurt by this situation he opted to resign from the band and Neal was hired full-time.

Those sessions with Bob Potter at the helm didn't work out for the band. So they plodded along, self producing the demo with Andrew St. George (Killer Dwarfs, Dan Gibson) engineering the recording and then mixer/producer Anthony Vanderburgh and engineer Rick Anderson (Rush) were brought in to mix and finish the job.

After a chance meeting between Nick Walsh, Rob Bruce and producer Paul Gross (SAGA, Lee Aaron) at an EMI publishing gala, a meeting was immediately set up to start working on an album. After finishing 6 songs that would eventually become the album known as Doin' the Nasty the band shopped once again garnering the attention of some major labels.

Capitol Records (EMI) signed the band in 1991 and issued an EP, Smooth And Deadly. This was followed in 1992 by the full album Doin' the Nasty. Both the EP and full-length album were produced by Paul Gross and co-produced by Anthony Vanderburgh and recorded at Toronto's world class facility studio Phase One. Slik Toxik toured throughout North America and released four singles which helped the album reach gold status in Canada and placed No. 61 on the Canadian music charts. They won the 1993 Juno Award for Hard Rock Album of the Year. The "White Lies/Black Truth" video won the People's Choice Award for 'Best Video Of The Year' and "Helluvatime" took home the 'Best Metal Video Award' at the 1992 MuchMusic Video Awards.

Slik Toxik kept in close touch with their fans through mail-outs and contests, which earned the band an enthusiastic grassroots following. As an indicator of their openness toward their fans, they were invited to be one of the last acts to play Toronto's popular Rock And Roll Bar, The Gas Works, on its closing night.

In 1992 they played at 'The Great Canadian Party', a Canada Day festival with The Tragically Hip, Spinal Tap, and 54-40 at Molson Park in Barrie, Ontario, and they toured North America as opening acts for Kim Mitchell, Faster Pussycat, Yngwie Malmsteen, and Black Sabbath before doing their own headlining tours with Sven Gali and Big House as their opening bands.

Hard rock had undergone profound changes in the period between Slik Toxik's formation in 1989 and 1994 when they reconvened to create their second album. In the confusion of the time, many successful and promising hard rock and glam metal bands were abandoned in favour of the newer hard rock trends. Bands such as Alice In Chains, Pantera, and Skid Row had successfully added crunch from the thrash metal scene to their music without compromising their hard rock and glam metal roots. Slik Toxik brought in various producers to add a similar heaviness to their own sound in order to stay true to themselves and their music. The label contracted Glenn Robinson (The Tea Party, Kyuss). Things were moving forward in positive ways; they had parted ways with RLM by this point and were trying to make a go of it on their own. However, there was a lot of turmoil and dysfunction happening within the band. Between depression, rampant drug and alcohol abuse the members were growing apart.

At the 1994 post-Juno Awards party, an intoxicated Pat Howarth stole and smashed a limousine, which led EMI to question the stability of the band as well as their viability in the changing hard rock climate. After the band had given him a chance to clean himself up, another incident occurred almost immediately and Howarth was then let go from the band. In need of a bass player, long time friend of Neal Busby, B.I.T. graduate Adam Headland was brought in as a hired gun to record the album and tour. It was at this time that EMI also suggested that Slik Toxik be moved to one of their subsidiary record labels with less money, less support and still carrying a huge debt load. So it was decided by the band to leave EMI and start fresh considering they had a wide fanbase.

Irrelevant (ironically) was released in 1994 and distributed by A&M Records and was again produced by Paul Gross and recorded at Phase One Studios in Toronto. Despite the best efforts of all involved, the album was not well received by the grunge-obsessed general public. It did garner some critical acclaim, but that was not enough to keep the band going. After many months apart, the band was brought together to do some final shows to take care of some business affairs. The final touring line up consisted of Nick Walsh, Rob Bruce, Neal Busby, Adam Headland, and guitarist Scott 'T-Bone' TeBeau.

== Subsequent activity ==
After the breakup of the band, individual members went their separate ways, joining new bands and releasing hard rock records in a wide variety of styles.

Singer Nick Walsh and lead guitarist Rob Bruce formed the modern rock/hard rock band Raised On Mars, and together they released a self-titled debut. Walsh went on to form the hard rock band Revolver with long time musical partner Laurie-Anne Green. Revolver had produced two albums, one being a CD/DVD set. In 2011, Revolver re-branded to become [Famous Underground]. Walsh also is currently singing with Canadian classic rock band MOXY for their 40th anniversary CD and tour and is also singing with Classic Albums Live.

Guitarist Kevin Gale plays in the modern rock/hard rock band Punishment. They released Beautiful Suffering, a 4-song EP. In 2010, Kevin then joined modern rock Toronto band In fact. As of 2012, Kevin has played with the band CORE. Since then, Punishment has regrouped and entered the studio as of October 2015.

Bassist Pat Howarth joined Brave New World, a Thunder Bay-based progressive rock band. Brave New World recorded 2 well received independent albums, The Demo, and Our Dystopian Lives before going on indefinite hiatus.

Neal Busby spent time in Toronto death metal/black metal band Solus, who released three underground metal albums. After Solus split up, Neil toured with classic rockers April Wine in place of the ailing Jerry Mercer. Most recently, Neal along with his wife, Huguette Arsenault, have had much success as a songwriting team known as TWIRL. They have had hundreds of songs placed in film, television and advertising such as: Pretty Little Liars, Piranha 3DD, Shameless, and Just Dance Kids 1&2. Busby teaches drums full-time and has released his first instructional drum book entitled The Ultimate Guide To Rock Drums, published by Mayfair Music.

The other ex-members of Slik Toxik have been mostly absent from the music scene.

== Band members ==
=== Final line-up ===
- Nick Walsh - vocals
- Rob Bruce - guitar
- Kevin Gale - guitar
- Adam Headland - bass
- Neal Busby - drums

=== Former ===
- Pat Howarth - bass (1990–1994)
- Alex Murno - drums (1986–1991)

== Discography ==
=== EPs ===
- Smooth And Deadly (Capitol Records, 1991)

=== Albums ===
- Doin' the Nasty (EMI, 1992)
- Irrelevant (Strawberry/A&M Records, 1994)

=== Singles ===
- "Big Fuckin' Deal" (Capitol Records, 1991)
- "Helluvatime" (EMI, 1992)
- "By The Fireside" (EMI, 1992)
- "White Lies, Black Truth" (EMI, 1992)
- "Sweet Asylum" (EMI, 1992)

=== Videos ===
- Big Fuckin' Deal (1991)
- Helluvatime (1992)
- White Lies, Black Truth (1992)
- By The Fireside (1992)
- Sweet Asylum (1992)
- Twentysomething (1994)
- Dive (1994)

=== Related bands and side projects ===
- Raised On Mars, Raised On Mars (independent, 1996)
- Solus, Our Frosting Hell EP (Skinmask Productions, 1998)
- Solus, Universal Bloodshed (Skinmask Productions, 1999)
- Brave New World, The Demo (independent, 1998)
- Brave New World, Our Dystopian Lives (TIB Records, 2000)
- Twirl, We Wuz Here (Itsaboutmusic.com, available on iTunes, 2005)
- Revolver, Turbulence (Sony/BMG and Koch; available on iTunes, 2007)
- Revolver, The New Blood Rock Show (2-disc live DVD/CD) (Babylon Music Group, available on iTunes, 2008)
- Punishment Beautiful Suffering EP (independent, 2009)
- Famous Underground (Babylon Music Group/DOTT/Universal/Sony: available on iTunes and Amazon, 2013)
- Famous Underground 'In My Reflection' (Babylon Music Group, 2021)
