= Coming Up Rosie =

- Genre: Children's sitcom
- Written by: Barbara Evans (1975); David Mayerovitch; Stuart Northey; Hedley Read (1976)
- Country of origin: Canada
- Original language: English
- No. of seasons: 2
- No. of episodes: 32

Production
- Running time: 30 minutes

Original release
- Network: CBC Television
- Release: 15 September 1975 – 1978

Coming Up Rosie is a Canadian children's television sitcom on CBC Television that aired for two seasons, in the fall of 1975 and 1976, and in repeats through 1978 and again for the summer of 1984.

== Premise ==
The show focuses on a group of tenants in an office building located at 99 Sumach Street, Toronto. Rosemary Radcliffe played the title character, aspiring Canadian documentary film-maker Rosie Tucker.

The initial cast also includes Fiona Reid as Mona Swicker, an operator for the Ringading Telephone Answering Service; John Stocker as elevator operator Dwayne Kramer; Dan Hennessey as Ralph Oberding, salesman for the Neva-Rust Storm Door Company; Barrie Baldaro as Rosie's production assistant Dudley Nightshade; and Dan Aykroyd as building janitor/superintendent Purvis Bickle.

Aykroyd appeared as a regular in this series concurrently with his star-making turn on Saturday Night Live, which debuted less than a month after Coming Up Rosie. The Toronto-based filming of the last few episodes of Coming Up Rosie's first season coincided with the earliest episodes of SNL in New York, making it necessary for Aykroyd to journey up to Toronto from New York (which he did by motorcycle) on early Sunday mornings immediately after Saturday Night Live broadcasts.

Cast member Fiona Reid was cast on King of Kensington almost simultaneously with the start of Coming Up Rosie, and citing her lack of improvisational skills ("I wasn't comfortable....Rosie demands a great improvisational head. I need set lines."), left Coming Up Rosie after the first season. Aykroyd also left the show after its first season, although he returned in the second season opener as a special guest.

Later cast members—replacing Aykroyd and Reid—included John Candy as Wally Wypyzypychwk, the Ukrainian owner of Sleep-Tite Burglar Alarms, and Catherine O'Hara as answering service operator Myrna Wallbacker. Both Candy and O'Hara also starred in Second City Television, actually appearing on Rosie concurrently with their early episodes of SCTV, which began in September 1976. Candy was also a regular on the sitcom The David Steinberg Show (1976–77) during this period, thereby simultaneously appearing as a regular on three separate series for three different Canadian networks.

Guest performers on the show in individual episodes included Jayne Eastwood, and from SCTV, Eugene Levy and Dave Thomas.

Many of the actors in this series also appeared in the less successful 1974–1975 CBC series Dr. Zonk and the Zunkins.

== Broadcast ==
For the first season in the fall of 1975, the series aired at 4:30pm on Mondays, Wednesdays and Fridays, and consisted of 25 episodes. The series frequency was reduced to once per week for the remaining season, 4:30 pm on Mondays in the fall of 1976, for which 13 episodes were produced. Repeats were aired on Tuesday afternoons in the 1977–78 TV season, and Thursday afternoons in the summer of 1984. The series has not been seen on broadcast TV since, and is not available on YouTube, but the CBC lists 38 episodes in their archives.

== Cast ==
- Dan Aykroyd (Purvis Bickle)
- Barrie Baldaro (Dudley Nightshade)
- John Candy (Wally Wypyzypywchuk)
- Dan Hennessey (Ralph Oberding)
- Catherine O'Hara (Myrna Wallbacker)
- Rosemary Radcliffe (Rosie Tucker)
- Fiona Reid (Mona Swicker)
- John Stocker (Dwayne Kramer)
