= Flappers (TV series) =

Canadian television series

- Genre: Sitcom
- Created by: Jack Humphrey
- Starring: Susan Roman; Derek McGrath
- Country of origin: Canada
- No. of seasons: 3
- No. of episodes: 43

Production
- Running time: Approx. 22 minutes

Original release
- Network: CBC
- Release: September 21, 1979 – November 30, 1981

Flappers is a Canadian television sitcom airing on the CBC from 1979 to 1981. Set in a Montreal nightclub owned by May Lamb (Susan Roman) during the Roaring Twenties, it followed the people who work in and around the club.

The series was directed by Alan Erlich, and produced by Joseph Partington, with Jack Humphrey as executive producer.

== Main cast ==
- Susan Roman — May
- Andrée Cousineau — Yvonne Marie
- Denise Proulx — Francine
- Michael Donaghue — Andy
- Victor Désy — Oscar
- Edward Atienza — Uncle Rummy
- Robert Lalonde — Robert
- Gail Dahms — Bunny
- Derek McGrath — Sam McTaggart
