= Rachel Hayward =

Canadian actress (born 1965)

- Born: August 7, 1965 (age 60); Toronto, Ontario, Canada
- Occupation: Actress
- Years active: 1985–present

Rachel Hayward (born August 7, 1965) is a Canadian actress. She began pursuing a serious acting career in her early twenties.

== Personal life ==
As a child and teen, Hayward was involved in modeling and commercials but always thought she would become a doctor. She graduated from the Ontario College of Art and Design, having studied graphic design and fine arts. From there she freelanced as a designer and simultaneously began working in acting.

Hayward is single and resides in Vancouver, British Columbia.

== Career ==
Hayward's feature film and TV movie credits include Stranger in the Mirror, Under the Gun, Breaking All the Rules, Deadfire, She Woke Up Pregnant, Convergence, Knight Moves and the romantic comedy Apartment Hunting.

In television she has starred as Florence in Chris Carter's series Harsh Realm and had a recurring role in Jake 2.0. She is remembered by many science fiction fans as the USAF Sergeant who is abducted by Apophis in the opening moments of the Stargate SG-1 pilot. She has also appeared in Andromeda, Bliss, Cold Squad, First Wave, Highlander: The Series, Millennium, Mutant X, Arctic Air, Sliders, The Dead Zone, The L Word, Tru Calling, Viper, Welcome to Paradox, Supernatural, & Xena: Warrior Princess.

== Filmography ==
=== Film ===
Year	Title	Role	Notes
1985	Breaking All the Rules	Angie	
1990	Whispers	Woman in morgue (uncredited)	
1991	Xtro II: The Second Encounter	Dr. Myers	
1992	Knight Moves	Last Victim	
1993	Time Runner	Caroline Raynor	
1993	Anything for Love	Ms. Glatt	Video
1995	Suspicious Agenda	Roxanne	
1996	The Final Cut	Barmaid Gabby	
1999	Limp	Dr. Fishbourne	
1999	The Fear: Resurrection	Trish	
1999	Y2K	Panama	
1999	Convergence	T.K. Wallace	
2000	Apartment Hunting	Lola	
2000	The Operative	Sonya	
2001	Lola	Woman at Phonebooth	
2002	Watchtower	Kate O'Conner	
2002	Hellraiser: Hellseeker	Allison	Video
2003	Cellmates	Carrie	
2003	Art History	Verity Phillips	Short film
2007	Numb	Spinning Instructor	
2007	Christmas in Wonderland	Judy Saunders	
2008	The Art of War II: Betrayal	Senator Samantha Carlson	Video
2008	While She Was Out	Lynn	
2009	Courage	Officer Evelyn Tubbs	
2011	Comforting Skin		
2012	Surviving High School	Judy	Video
2014	Jingle All the Way 2	Maggie	Video
2017	Wonder	Miranda's Mother	

=== Television ===
Year	Title	Role	Notes
1990	Neon Rider	Beth	Episode: "John Doe"
1991	Palace Guard	Princess Jacqueline	Episode: "Iced"
1991	The Commish	Marie Pulaski	Episode: "A Matter of Life or Death: Part 1"; Episode: "A Matter of Life or Death: Part 2"
1993	The Sea Wolf	Ann Treadwell	TV movie
1993	A Stranger in the Mirror	Harriett	TV movie
1994	Robin's Hoods	Helen Rpinehart	Episode: "Kidnapped Boyfriend"
1995	Wirehead	Cowgirl 3 (voice)	Video game
1995	Sliders	Karen the Summoner	Episode: "Eggheads"
1995	Highlander: The Series	The Duchess	Episode: "Leader of the Pack"
1996	Highlander: The Series	Delila	Episode: "The End of Innocence"
1996	She Woke Up Pregnant	Jill Weitz	TV movie
1996	Bloodhounds II	Bookstore Fan	TV movie
1997	Dead Fire	Alexa Stant	TV movie
1997	Stargate SG-1	Sgt. Carol Weterings	Episode: "Children of the Gods"
1997	Police Academy: The Series	Lisa Landon	Episode: "All at Sea"
1997	Viper	Julianna 'Jolie' Morrow	Episode: "Wheelman"
1998	Viper	Maureen Masters	Episode: "The Really Real Reenactment"
1998	Millennium	Angela	Episode: "The Mikado"
1998	Voyage of Terror	Gina Reid	TV movie
1998	The Net	Emma Roe	Episode: "Go Like You Know"
1998	Welcome to Paradox	Megan Galloway	Episode: "Blue Champagne Resort"
1998	First Wave	Susan Tannen	Episode: "Blue Agave"
1999	First Wave	Susan Tannen	Episode: "The Decision"
1999	Xena: Warrior Princess	Amazon	Episode: "Them Bones, Them Bones"
1999	Cold Squad	Diane Armstrong	Episode: "Death, Lies and Videotape"
1999-2000	Harsh Realm	Florence	7 episodes
2000	The Hunger	Elizabeth	Episode: "The Seductress"
2000	Deadlocked	Rachel Castlemore	TV movie
2000	Call of the Wild	Adoley Thornton	13 episodes
2001	Andromeda	Adulasia Stalin; Cory	Episode: "Fear and Loathing in the Milky Way"; Episode: "Last Call at the Broken Hammer"
2002	Cabin Pressure	Reece Robbins	TV movie
2002	Sightings	Jamie	TV movie
2002	Snow Queen	Amy	TV movie
2003	Mutant X	Christina	Episode: "Within These Walls"
2003	The Dead Zone	Alma / Rosemary	Episode: "The Man Who Never Was"
2003	Bliss	Amanda	Episode: "Office Management"
2003	Devil Winds	Karen Sowells	TV movie
2003-2004	Jake 2.0	Valerie Warner	5 episodes
2004	The L Word	Ellie	Episode: "Losing It"
2004	Tru Calling	Adrian Barnes	Episode: "Drop Dead Gorgeous"
2004	The Eleventh Hour	Corporal Linda Macey	Episode: "Rather Be Wrong"
2004	Deep Evil	Captain O'Brien	TV movie
2004	Cold Squad	Mama	Episode: "Righteous"
2006	Augusta, Gone	Judy	TV movie
2006	Godiva's	Suki	Episode: "The Bigger Man"
2006	Battlestar Galactica	Blonde Woman	Episode: "Torn"
2006	Last Chance Cafe	Katie Stratton	TV movie
2006	Holiday Wishes	Mrs. Fulton	TV movie
2007	Cleaverville	Andi	TV movie
2007	Unthinkable	Susan Shaw	TV movie
2007	Painkiller Jane	Jennifer Meyers	Episode: "Something Nasty in the Neighborhood"
2007	Perfect Child	Dr. Ferrel	TV movie
2008	The Christmas Clause	Marcia	TV movie
2011	A Trusted Man	Laura	TV movie
2012	Arctic Air	Rita Gilbride	Episode: "All the Vital Things"; Episode: "Northern Lights"; Episode: "Skeletons in the Closet"
2013	She Made Them Do It	Julia Rogers	TV movie
2014	Supernatural	Tara	Episode: "First Born"; Episode: "Proverbs 17:3"
2014	Driven Underground	Molly	TV movie
2015	Stolen Daughter	Martha	TV movie
2016	A Firehouse Christmas	Lori Lawrence	TV movie
2016	Hearts of Christmas	Kate Miller	TV movie
2021	Gabby Duran and the Unsittables	Ruth	Guest star, episode; Fountain of Ruth
2025-2026	Watson	Detective Lestrade	Recurring, 8 episodes
