= Henry's World =

- Clockwise from left to right: Henry, Darwin, Fraidy, and Margaret the dog
- Genre: Children's animation Fantasy; Cartoon series
- Created by: Michael McGowan
- Written by: Michael McGowan; Alan Gregg; Kenn Scott; Simon Racioppa; Richard Elliott
- Directed by: Dave Thomas (Season 1); Todd Peterson (Season 2)
- Starring: Samantha Reynolds; Tracey Moore; Julie Lemieux; Fiona Reid; Colin Fox; Daveed Louza
- Countries of origin: Canada; Germany (season 1)
- Original language: English
- No. of seasons: 2
- No. of episodes: 26

Production
- Executive producers: Adam Shaheen (Season 1); Ken Faier (Season 2); Michael McGowan (Season 2)
- Producers: Alan Gregg; Paul Vella (Season 1)
- Camera setup: Digital Betacam
- Running time: 22 minutes
- Production companies: Cuppa Coffee Studio; Alliance Atlantis Communications; TV-Loonland AG (Season 1)

Original release
- Network: Family Channel
- Release: August 24, 2002 – August 6, 2004

Henry's World is a Canadian animated children's television series produced for Canada's Family Channel by Cuppa Coffee Animation and Alliance Atlantis Communications, with German company TV-Loonland AG also producing season 1. It was first aired from 2002 to 2004, with a total of 26 episodes produced. The series follows Henry Wiggins, a boy who has an extraordinary ability to make his wishes come true when eating his mother's mushy carrots. This was the first stop-motion animated series to be entirely produced in Canada.

== Plot ==
Henry Wiggins (voiced by Samantha Reynolds) is the third oldest of five children (himself, two older twin brothers and two younger twin sisters). When he was just five years old, Henry discovered that eating his mother's mushy carrots gave him the ability to make wishes come true. Once eaten, Henry can make one wish come true. However, as he is only eight years old, his unusual wishes are often played out with unexpected consequences and his insatiable curiosity invariably spells disaster, but Henry also learns some of life's lessons along the way.

Henry shares his secret and misadventures with his best friend Fraidy Begonia (voiced by Tracey Moore), his faithful pet dog Margaret (voiced by Julie Lemieux), and Doris (voiced by Fiona Reid), a dragon who lives in Henry's closet. Other characters in the show include Henry's Uncle Neptune (voiced by Colin Fox), Ms. Pierre (also voiced by Fiona Reid), Henry's teacher and the anti-hero Darwin (also voiced by Julie Lemieux), an overweight bully who sometimes teases and picks on Henry.

== Episodes ==
=== Season 1 (2002) ===
No. overall	No. in season	Title	Written by
1	1	"Pet Dinosaur"	Michael McGowan
1	1	"Pirate Out of Water"	Alan Gregg
Pet Dinosaur: Henry wants a pet dinosaur but must learn about responsibility to avoid disasters. Pirate Out of Water: Henry becomes a pirate to escape rules and obligations.
2	2	"My Two Front Teeth"	Michael McGowan
2	2	"Goragh"	Simon Racioppa & Richard Elliott
My Two Front Teeth: After Henry loses his teeth, he wishes to be invisible so that he can go to Tooth Fairy Land. Goragh: In the project on the prehistory of school, Henry gets the information directly from a caveman named Goragh!
3	3	"Triple Trouble"	Michael McGowan
3	3	"Tunnelling to China"	Michael McGowan
Triple Trouble: Henry keeps forgetting his homework, chores, and piano practice, so he wishes he had three more Henrys. At first, everything goes well, but then the tasks they are supposed to handle start getting out of control. Tunnelling to China: When Henry decides to dig his way to China, he is captured by a tribe of Pale-Faced Hermits.
4	4	"Is Anybody Out There?"	Michael McGowan
4	4	"Secrets"	Diana Kimpton
Is Anybody Out There?: A trip to Pluto gives Henry a new-found appreciation for his dog Margaret, when he realizes that on Pluto, she's a hero! Secrets: Henry gains the ability to read people's secrets and sets out to read all the secrets of Chestervale!
5	5	"My Gorilla Is Bigger Than Yours"	Michael McGowan
5	5	"Whither Weather"	Simon Racioppa & Richard Elliott
My Gorilla Is Bigger Than Yours: Determined to show off and make Darwin look ridiculous during the "show and tell" activity, Henry wishes for a real, flesh-and-blood gorilla to appear. Whither Weather: Fraidy wants to clean up the park, but his plans are thwarted by bad weather, and Henry tries to help with the weather but things go wrong.
6	6	"Sugar Overload"	Michael McGowan
6	6	"Lady Luck"	Simon Racioppa & Richard Elliott
Sugar Overload: When Darwin refuses to share his ice cream, Henry conjures a magical sugar fountain that everyone (except Darwin) can use, but things get out of hand as they eat sweets non-stop. Lady Luck: Henry has a run of bad luck in the morning and wishes for good luck, but he disrupts the balance between luck and destiny for everyone else.
7	7	"Henry the Magnificent"	Simon Racioppa
7	7	"Jump to It"	Stephen Smith
Henry the Magnificent: Henry wants to become a magician, but Darwin steals his spellbook and starts casting spells all over the school, causing Chestervale to transform into Darwinvale—with Darwin as king! Jump to It: A jumping competition is being held at Henry's school, and he is determined to win and wants a mentor to help him secure the victory.
8	8	"Hitch In Time"	Simon Racioppa
8	8	"Doris' Day"	Michael McGowan
Hitch In Time: After being mocked by everyone and feeling ashamed over a project that went wrong, Henry wishes he could turn back time. However, the special time-manipulating watch has catastrophic side effects that keep getting worse. Doris' Day: Today is Doris's birthday, and Henry wants to give her a gift, but things keep breaking—and she thinks Henry is the one breaking them. Henry and Fraidy visit Dragonville to find out why Doris ran away from home and why she refuses to talk about her past or her behavior.
9	9	"Love Is in the Air"	Dennis Heaton
9	9	"Who's Afraid of the Dark?"	Chris Trengrove & Alan Gregg
Love Is in the Air: Henry's plan to make Mrs. Pierre fall in love with Uncle Neptune goes wrong, accidentally causing Darwin and Fraidy to fall in love instead. Who's Afraid of the Dark?: Henry wishes for "super night vision" to find out what creatures really are lurking in the night shadows.
10	10	"Middle Child Blues"	Michael McGowan
10	10	"Silver Tongue"	Simon Racioppa
Middle Child Blues: Feeling isolated after his family leaves him at the park, Henry summons Wanda and discovers what home would be like without him. Silver Tongue: Henry wants everyone to believe everything he says, and then he spreads panic throughout the town with the rumor that Bigfoot is on the loose.
11	11	"Carrots Away"	Kenn Scott
11	11	"Price of Lame"	Simon Racioppa
Carrots Away: Henry tries to win the Chestervale go-kart race but discovers that his mother's carrot puree recipe no longer works. Price of Lame: Henry wants to be a famous movie star.
12	12	"Costume Capers"	Simon Racioppa
12	12	"Fire's Out"	Kenn Scott
Costume Capers: It’s Halloween, and Henry wants to have the best costume of all. When he turns into a werewolf, he must find a way to get back to normal. Fire's Out: Henry, Fraidy, and Margaret shrink down and enter Doris's body to help cure the cold.
13	13	"X-Ray X-mas"	Alan Gregg
13	13	"Darwin for a Day"	Evan Solomon
X-Ray X-Mas: Henry wishes for X-Ray glasses to see what his Christmas presents are. Darwin for a Day: Henry wants to be Darwin and discovers that his life in Darwin isn't as easy as it seems.

=== Season 2 (2003–04) ===
No. overall	No. in season	Title	Written by
14	1	"Super Hero Henry"	Michael McGowan
14	1	"Treasure Hunt"	Michael McGowan
Super Hero Henry: Henry becomes a superhero and discovers that the true meaning of heroism is not just having superpowers and a cape. Treasure Hunt: Henry learns a lesson about cooperation when he teams up with Darwin for a treasure hunt.
15	2	"Henry's New Shoes"	Claire Ross Dunn
15	2	"Stuck on You"	Claire Ross Dunn
Henry's New Shoes: Henry turns into a super-athlete capable of performing impossible stunts, but soon no one wants to play with him because he beats them at everything. Stuck on You: Henry becomes a human magnet after working as a treasure hunter.
16	3	"Henry's Massive Munchies"	Simon Racioppa & Richard Elliott
16	3	"Plant Life"	Stephen Smith
Henry's Massive Munchies: Henry wants to win a pie-eating contest; by eating a lot, he gets bigger. Plant Life: Henry wants to accelerate plant growth when he teams up with Darwin for a science project, but as the plants grow, they shoot up high into the sky.
17	4	"Home Run Henry"	TBA
17	4	"Henry the Brave Knight"	TBA
Home Run Henry: Henry wants a special bat to help him win a baseball game. Henry the Brave Knight: Henry wishes to be a knight and travel to medieval times.
18	5	"Henry and Henrietta"	Michael McGowan
18	5	"Stage Fright"	Simon Racioppa & Richard Elliott
Henry and Henrietta: Upon seeing that Fraidy is with another best friend, Henry finds a new best friend named Henrietta Stage Fright: Henry feels stage fright before the school performance of "Sleeping Beauty" and wants to be the best Prince Charming of all time.
19	6	"Happy Birthday Henry"	Alan Gregg
19	6	"Henry's Big Story"	N/A
Happy Birthday Henry: Henry wishes every day were his birthday. Henry's Big Story: Henry wants to be the best writer in Chestervale, but things get out of hand when a typewriter makes everything he writes come true.
20	7	"Henry's Little Adventure"	TBA
20	7	"Henry the Cook"	TBA
Henry's Little Adventure: When Henry accidentally loses his mother's ring, he sets out to retrieve it by venturing into the kitchen drain where it fell. Henry the Cook: Henry becomes a great cook to surprise Darwin.
21	8	"The Chestervale Challenge"	TBA
21	8	"Fishing Friends"	TBA
The Chestervale Challenge: Henry sets a world record by blowing the largest bubblegum bubble in history. Fishing Friends: Henry wants to beat Darwin at fishing, but ends up facing the Chestervale sea monster.
22	9	"King of Chestervale"	TBA
22	9	"Henry the Halloween Wizard"	TBA
King of Chestervale: When Henry cannot get anyone to do what he wants, he wishes to become the king of Chestervale. Henry the Halloween Wizard: Henry wants to become a real magician and ends up annoying the magician.
23	10	"Kung Fu Henry"	TBA
23	10	"Henry the Cowboy"	TBA
Kung Fu Henry: Henry wants to become a kung fu expert to participate in martial arts. Henry the Cowboy: Henry wants to become a cowboy.
24	11	"Now You See Me"	TBA
24	11	"Talk to the Animals"	TBA
Now You See Me: Henry accidentally splashed mud on Darwin's best clothes; Henry wishes to be invisible so that Darwin never finds him. Talk to the Animals: Henry wants a pair of animal-themed headphones to communicate with Margaret, without realizing that Margaret isn't excited about the pet contest.
25	12	"Dad for a Day"	TBA
25	12	"Haircut Hoopla"	TBA
Dad for a Day: Henry wants to be his father for a day to win the big go-kart race. Haircut Hoopla: After Darwin gives Henry a bad haircut, Henry wishes his hair would grow back quickly.
26	13	"Henry's Christmas Gifts"	TBA
26	13	"Snow Day"	TBA
Snow Day: Henry puts off his science project and then wishes for a snow day. Henry's Christmas Gifts: Henry wants to find a way to get all the Christmas gifts on his list.

== Release ==
Henry's World was also seen on ABC Kids in Australia (21 October 2002 – 31 October 2011) and Animania HD in the USA. The first season of the show is available on a two-disc DVD set from Echo Bridge Entertainment.
