= Jack Humphrey (producer) =

Canadian television producer and writer

John Roland Humphrey (May 20, 1932 – April 18, 1987) was a Canadian television producer and writer.

Born in Saint Boniface, Manitoba, he grew up in Vancouver, British Columbia. He was introduced to the entertainment industry by his sister, J.J. McColl (née Joane Elizabeth Humphrey), a writer and CBC Radio personality. Humphrey wrote and performed in the radio comedies Vancouver Scene and Two for the Show for CBC Radio One. He also worked for the Vancouver radio station CJOR and later hosted the CBC Television variety show Parade.

Humphrey relocated to Toronto, Ontario, in 1967, where he produced the CBC Radio political satire show Inside from the Outside from 1969 to 1975. Humphrey, along with his partner Louis Del Grande, wrote and story edited the CBC Television sitcom, King of Kensington, eventually going on to become executive producer of the series, which ran from 1975 to 1980.

Humphrey wrote the pilot for the sitcom Flappers, and served as executive producer for the series, which ran from 1979 to 1981. He also adapted the CBC Radio series Travels with Aunt Jane into a television sitcom created for especially for actress Jane Mallett. He helped launch the series Seeing Things, which ran from 1981 to 1987 and starred Louis Del Grande, and developed and executive produced the sitcom Hangin' In, which ran from 1981 to 1986. He also wrote for and executive produced episodes of Silver Spoons and worked as a story consultant for The Facts of Life.

== Personal life ==
Humphrey and his wife Sidney had five children, all of whom chose careers in entertainment. Their son, Mark, is an actor, and sons John, Paul, and Andy are professional musicians. Their daughter Lesley is a former Ford model who works as a stage manager.

Jack Humphrey died of cancer in 1987, aged 54, in Toronto.
