= Osmond Christmas Album =

Studio album by The Osmonds
- Released: December 18, 1976
- Genre: Pop, Christmas music
- Length: 52:31
- Label: Polydor
- Producer: Don Costa

The Osmonds chronology
Brainstorm (1976)	Osmond Christmas Album (1976)	Greatest Hits (1977)

Professional ratings
Review scores
Source	Rating
Allmusic	3/5 stars

Osmond Christmas Album is a holiday album by the Osmond family, released in 1976. The album peaked at No. 127 on the U.S. Billboard Top LP's chart, a modest improvement from their previous two albums.

The original double album consisted of twenty Christmas songs (listed below) combining some original songs with traditional carols and secular Christmas standards, and included all seven performing members of the Osmond family, the first studio album to do so. Each track featured one of the various acts encompassed by the seven siblings: The Osmond Brothers, Donny Osmond, Marie Osmond, Donny & Marie as a duet, or Jimmy Osmond.

Later re-issues on compact disc were under the title Osmond Family Christmas and had eight of the original tracks removed, including all of Jimmy's solo performances. Some of the re-issued tracks added Marie singing along with her brothers on tracks that she originally did not perform on.

== Album Notes ==
- The track Sleigh Ride is a completely different song from the Leroy Anderson composition.
- All of the Osmonds (the brothers with Marie and Jimmy) perform together only on the Pine Cones & Holly Berries/It's Beginning To Look A Lot Like Christmas medley.
- Caroling Medley, an assortment of ten traditional Christmas carols, is performed by the Osmond Brothers a cappella.

== Track listing (original 1976 release) ==
Side One
No.	Title	Length
1.	"I'll Be Home for Christmas"	3:07
2.	"Winter Wonderland" (Donny & Marie)	2:40
3.	"Kay Thompson's Jingle Bells"	2:33
4.	"If Santa Were My Daddy" (Jimmy)	2:21
5.	"Blue Christmas" (Marie)	2:31

Side Two
No.	Title	Length
6.	"Silver Bells" (Donny & Marie)	2:59
7.	"It Never Snows in L.A." (Jimmy)	3:00
8.	"This Christmas Eve" (Donny)	2:46
9.	"Medley: Pine Cones and Holly Berries / It's Beginning to Look a Lot Like Christmas" (All the Osmonds)	2:11
10.	"White Christmas"	2:24

Side Three
No.	Title	Length
11.	"What Are You Doing New Year's Eve?" (Donny)	3:32
12.	"Sleigh Ride"	3:39
13.	"The Christmas Song"	2:58
14.	"A Very Merry Christmas" (Merrill)	2:49
15.	"Caroling Medley" (Caroling, Caroling/Here We Come A'Caroling/Christmas Is A-Comin'/God Rest Ye Merry Gentlemen/O Little Town Of Bethlehem/The First Noel/Hark The Herald Angels Sing/O Come All Ye Faithful/Joy To The World/Deck The Halls/We Wish You A Merry Christmas)	4:13

Side Four
No.	Title	Length
16.	"Let It Snow! Let It Snow! Let It Snow!" (Marie)	2:16
17.	"The Christmas Waltz"	3:17
18.	"Old-Fashioned Christmas" (Donny)	3:16
19.	"When He Comes Again" (Jimmy)	3:13
20.	"Silent Night"	2:52

== Track listing (1991 re-release) ==
No.	Title	Length
1.	"I'll Be Home for Christmas"	3:07
2.	"Winter Wonderland" (Donny & Marie)	2:40
3.	"Kay Thompson's Jingle Bells"	2:33
4.	"Blue Christmas" (Marie)	2:31
5.	"What Are You Doing New Year's Eve?" (Donny)	3:32
6.	"The Christmas Song"	2:58
7.	"White Christmas"	2:24
8.	"Let It Snow! Let It Snow! Let It Snow!" (Marie)	2:16
9.	"The Christmas Waltz"	3:17
10.	"Silver Bells" (Donny & Marie)	2:59
11.	"Medley: Pine Cones and Holly Berries / It's Beginning to Look a Lot Like Christmas" (All the Osmonds)	2:11
12.	"Silent Night"	2:52
