= Death of Manon Dubé =

1978 disappearance and death of a child in Quebec

Manon Dubé
- Dubé, c. 1977
- Born: c. 1967 Quebec, Canada
- Disappeared: January 27, 1978
- Died: Massawippi, Quebec (aged 10)
- Cause of death: Undetermined. Possible drowning or exposure
- Body discovered: March 24, 1978
- Known for: Unknown manner of death
- Mother: Jeannine Dubé

Manon Dubé was a 10-year-old Canadian girl from Sherbrooke, Quebec who disappeared on January 27, 1978, in the Eastern Townships of Quebec, and was found dead in Ayer's Cliff on March 24, 1978. Although the precise cause of Dubé's death remains uncertain, Canada's National Post has unveiled compelling evidence that she was murdered. After discovering links between the circumstances of Dubé's case and the close resemblance to the recent deaths of two other girls, Theresa Allore and Louise Camirand, they theorized that the three deaths may have been committed by the same person. After bringing in geographic profiler, Kim Rossmo, an expert in connecting serial crimes, he strongly suggested that a serial killer was operating in the area during the late 1970's.

== Disappearance ==
On January 27, 1978, Manon Dubé (10), was outdoors with her friends and younger sister, Chantal (7), sledding on hills only three blocks from Dubé and Chantal's Bienville street apartment. At around 7:30 p.m., once it started to grow dark, the Dubé siblings and their friends decided it was time to head home. Approximately one block from the apartment building, Chantal ran ahead out of the cold, leaving Dubé behind on the street corner. This would be the last time Dubé was seen alive. When Dubé failed to arrive home later that night, her mother Jeannine immediately reported her missing. She was last seen wearing a navy blue snowsuit, a salmon-coloured scarf, a tuque, red mittens, and snow boots.

That same night, the police published a bulletin with Dubé's name and photo. They then organized a large search party of sixteen officers and two tracker dogs to find Dubé in the woods nearby, while a separate thirteen-officer party conducted house-to-house investigations along rue Bienville, and several snowmobile volunteers combed the area between Sherbrooke and Ste-Élie d’Orford. Chantal would tell police that she and her cousin were followed by someone in a dark Buick the previous week, and when questioned, neighbours admitted that their children had been approached by strangers during the last few months.

Less than two days later, Jeannine received multiple phone calls from unknown people, one of whom claimed they had Dubé in their possession and would only safely return her upon receiving $25,000. Jeannine, a new widow, had recently received approximately $20,000 from her late husband's life insurance policy. It is speculated that the caller was aware of this, and the police believe the phone call to have been a hoax.

The following day police announced the ransom call was most likely a hoax. The Dubé's telephone number had been broadcast on a local radio station. Someone probably called up Dubé's mother as a sick joke. Hope turned to despair. Dubé's mother prepared for the worst and she stated: "I can't help but think she has been abducted, attacked, or raped. I pray to God this hasn't happened."

=== Discovery ===
On March 24, 1978, Good Friday, Dubé's body was found on an isolated road 30 km from Sherbrooke, face-down and partially frozen in a stream, by two teenagers from Montreal. Dubé had the same winter clothes on, save one red mitten and her tuque (which was eventually recovered), from when she had last been seen, there was a gash on her forehead that may have been caused by the jagged ice, and she also had suffered broken bones. Police estimated that her body had most likely been there for most of the two months she had been missing.

== Aftermath ==
Dubé's body was taken to Montreal where an autopsy was performed. It was suggested that the gash on her head may have been caused by something metal and her body may have been moved to the stream where she was found. Additionally she may have been there for less than two months and less than the time she was missing. It has been suggested by random people that she may be the victim of a hit and run, and that she may have been sexually abused, but no evidence indicates either of these. The case became cold and remained dormant until 2001, when Dubé's sister requested that it be reopened. After reinvestigating, the results proved inconclusive and the case went cold again.

== See also ==
- List of kidnappings (1970–1979)
- List of solved missing person cases (1970s)
- List of unsolved deaths
- List of unsolved murders (1900–1979)

== Cited works and further reading ==
- Cooper, Edith (2003). Missing and Exploited Children: Overview and Policy Concerns. Novinka Books. ISBN 978-1-590-33815-5.
- Pettem, Silvia (2013). Cold Case Research: Resources for Unidentified, Missing, and Cold Homicide Cases. CRC Press. ISBN 978-1-466-57053-5.
- Rossmo, Kim (2008). Criminal Investigative Failures. Taylor & Francis. ISBN 978-1-420-04752-3.
- Wojna, Lisa (2009). Unsolved Murders of Canada. Quagmire Press. ISBN 978-0-978-34095-7.
