= Andrew Hull =

Canadian film director and screenwriter

Andrew Mackenzie Hull
- Born: August 15, 1963; Oshawa, Ontario, Canada
- Died: May 8, 2010 (aged 46); London, England
- Education: Lakefield College School, Ontario
- Alma mater: Carleton University, Ottawa
- Occupations: Architect and film director
- Years active: 1989–2010
- Partner: Shaan Syed

Andrew Mackenzie Hull (August 15, 1963 – May 8, 2010) was a Canadian-born film maker, film director and architect.

Hull worked as an architect in Paris in 1991 before moving to Dessau, Germany and later to Berlin. In Dessau, he worked video and animation projects and mentored students. In 1992, he was co-commissioned to make a documentary video, "Pay No Attention to the Man Behind the Curtain". In Dessau, Hull also the 43 minute film Earworm, and presented the video installation, Berlin Alexanderplatz, at the Ostranenie International Video Festival.

In 1996, Hull returned to Canada, living in Toronto. He worked as an art director in film and television. He also wrote and directed his own short films, including Dizzy (2003) and That Thing We Do (2004). In 2003, he was invited to enter the director's program at the Canadian Film Centre. He graduated in 2004 with the short film Squeezebox, a tragicomedy starring Mary Margaret O'Hara. This was followed by the 5 minute short, Rewind. In 2008, Hull re-located to London and begin production on his first feature film, Siren, a horror / thriller that premiered in 2010 to critical acclaim. The film was subsequently bought by Lionsgate and released on DVD. When Hull died in 2010, he was editing his final short film, Breaking and Entering. The film was subsequently released by his estate.

Hull's short film, Dizzy, was the winner of Best Short at the Long Island Gay and Lesbian Film Festival in 2003 and the short That Thing We Do was the winner of Best Short at the Tampa International Gay and Lesbian Film Festival in 2004.

== Early life ==
Andrew Hull was born in Oshawa, Ontario, Canada. He was the youngest of three children born to Ralph Hull, psychiatrist, and Margot Finley, an artist.

Hull spent his childhood in Ann Arbor, Michigan and Peterborough, Ontario, attended Lakefield College School as a boy, and studied architecture at Carleton University, Ottawa. During his studies in 1989, he won the AIA/ACSA Research Council-Otis Elevator International Student Competition for his mixed-use commercial, retail and residential design for a development in historic London. Despite this accolade, his interests shifted to film and video.

Being one of the first students to work with video at the School of Architecture, he graduated with an experimental video work about a cryptic symbol of a traced hand that appears in the urban environment. This first completed video marked his move from architecture into narrative film.

== Career ==
While working as an architect in Paris in 1991, Hull was invited to Germany by Carleton University colleagues Stephen Kovats and Ian Johnston to work on video and animation projects and to mentor students of the Bauhaus Dessau's international and multi-disciplinary 'Experimental Studio Dessau North'. In 1992, he was co-commissioned by the 'Werkstatt Industrielles Gartenreich' of the Bauhaus Dessau Foundation to make a documentary video about the 'Kulturpalast Bitterfeld', a Socialist Utopian model project of the German Democratic Republic, built in 1954. His collaborator in this video project was Stephen Kovats, media researcher, architect and artistic director of Transmediale. The film was entitled "Pay No Attention to the Man Behind the Curtain".

As a result of this collaboration, Hull moved to Germany, living first in Dessau, later in Berlin. He made films during this period and taught at the Bauhaus Dessau in the newly created Electronic Media Interpretation Studio. Hull's films from this time explored the genres of horror and comedy, the real and the fictional; they also documented and questioned the strained political and social transformations taking place in Germany after the fall of the Berlin Wall. In Dessau, he made Earworm, a forty-three-minute film funded by both German and Canadian Arts Councils, that told the story of a group of anarchist karaoke enthusiasts gripped by a mysterious virus that causes an addiction to techno music and a taste for sucking the inner ear out of unsuspecting victims. The film could be read as a metaphor and biting satire on the paranoia of communist era East Germany, intertwined with the politics around HIV/AIDS, and the growing gay underground club and rave scene in Germany in the late eighties and early nineties. Hull also presented the video installation Berlin Alexanderplatz at the Ostranenie International Video Festival at the Bauhaus Dessau.

In 1996, Hull returned to Canada and lived in Toronto until 2008. While working as an Art Director in the Canadian/US Film and Television industry, he wrote and directed several of his own short films. Dizzy (Winner of Best Short at the Long Island Gay and Lesbian Film Festival in 2003) and That Thing We Do (Winner of Best Short at the Tampa International Gay and Lesbian Film Festival in 2004) were made with assistance from the Canada Council for the Arts and the Ontario Arts Council and were coming-of-age stories directly based on his own experiences and diaristic writings. In 2003, Hull was one of eight students invited to enter the Director's Program at the Norman Jewison created Canadian Film Centre (CFC), Canada's foremost school for advanced training in film, television and new media. He graduated in 2004 with the short film Squeezebox, a tragicomedy starring Canadian cult rock heroine, actress and singer-songwriter Mary Margaret O'Hara. The film is the story of a teen accordion prodigy who struggles to reunite the family band after his father's suicide. Rewind, a five-minute film made shortly after Hull's graduation from the Canadian Film Centre, paid homage to film noir and was loosely based on Martin Amis' book Time's Arrow. All of Hull's films from this period went on to tour at film festivals around the globe.

In 2008, Hull re-located to London, England, to be with his life partner, contemporary artist and painter, Shaan Syed, and to begin production on his first feature film, Siren, co-written with Canadian-born, US-based screenwriter Geoffrey Gunn. Siren, a horror / thriller genre film is an allegory on the Greek myth of the siren, and tells the tale of three friends whose lives are forever changed when they stop to rescue a beautiful young woman on a remote island. The film was produced by UK-based Poisson Rouge Pictures and was shot in Tunisia during the summer of 2009. The film's soundtrack features and is based on the Los Angeles all-girl group Warpaint's song, "Elephants". It premiered on November 11, 2010, at Abertoir Film Festival in Wales, UK to critical acclaim and was subsequently bought by Lionsgate to be released to DVD in March 2011.

When Hull died, he was close to finishing a final edit on his newest short film Breaking and Entering, shot in Toronto in 2008. The film is a story of a young man coming to terms with the death of his father, and is based on the short story of the same name by Canadian author Andrew Pyper. The film was subsequently completed by the Estate of Andrew Hull.

Hull was a member of the Directors Guild of Canada. His short films are distributed by the Canadian Film Maker's Distribution Centre (CFMDC) and V tape, both in Toronto. Siren is distributed by Lionsgate.

== Death ==
Hull died at the Royal London Hospital on May 8, 2010, of a head injury as a result of a fall from his bicycle.

== Posthumous tributes ==
London-based choreographer and artistic director of Dance Art Foundation, Joe Moran dedicated his piece Score for 30 Dancers to Hull. It was presented on May 27, 2010, as part of From Morning, a day of dance and performance curated by London-based dancer and choreographer, Florence Peak. The piece was performed by thirty of the UK's most prominent dance artists and was made in response to an invitation to create a new site-specific work that spoke to the distinct architecture of Nicholas Hawksmoor's Christ Church, Spitalfields in the East End of London, the neighbourhood where Hull lived and died from 2008 to 2010.

London-based Dutch contemporary artist, Magali Reus, in the final credit of her 2010 video work Finish, dedicated the piece to Hull. The short work was premiered at Galerie Fons Welters in Amsterdam in July 2010 as part of a solo exhibition of sculpture and video titled Weekend and featured five athletes/actors racing against the backdrop of an ocean beach. Reus had previously featured Hull in her video Conflicting Shadows (2009) as the main actor playing an ambiguous street patroller at night.

In November 2010, Hull's life partner, artist Shaan Syed, began The Andrew Project, a street-poster campaign featuring one thousand identical line drawings of Hull's portrait posted throughout Toronto, the city in which the couple first met in 2001.

== Filmography ==
Year	Title	Role	Notes
1989	The City Rediscovered	Writer/Director	21min, betacam
1993	Pay No Attention to the Man Behind the Curtain	Writer/Director	56min Hi8. Collaboration with Stephen Kovats
1996	Earworm	Writer/Director	43min, video Hi8/Super 8
1996	Calypso !	Writer/Director	4:26min, video
1999	Dizzy	Writer/Director	19min, 16mm
2003	That thing we do	Writer/Director	16min, 35mm
2003	Wilden Jungen	Co-Writer/Co-director	5min, Super 8, video. Collaboration with Shaan Syed. An invitational by IMAGES, Toronto's GLTB Film Festival.
2005	Squeezebox	Writer/Director	14min, 35mm
2006	Rewind	Writer/Director	5min, HD
2011	Siren	Director/Co-Writer	feature film, redcam. Co-written with Geoffrey Gunn, distributed by Lionsgate.
2011	Breaking and Entering	Writer/Director	7min, redcam. Completed posthumously by the Estate of Andrew Hull.
