= Gail Dahms =

Canadian actress and singer

Gail Dahms (born June 27, 1957) is a former Canadian actress and singer, most noted as a Juno Award nominee for Most Promising Female Vocalist at the Juno Awards of 1977.

Originally from Kitchener, Ontario, she had musical theatre roles in various local theatre productions, including South Pacific, Annie Get Your Gun, Guys and Dolls and Fiddler on the Roof, in her teenage years. She was signed to a recording contract soon after finishing high school, and recorded a number of singles in 1975 and 1976, including "Can't We Somehow", "Rescue Me" and "This Song Reminds Me of You". However, she became best known in this era as the star of a series of television commercials for Turtles candy, playing a sexy Marilyn Monroe-style character who sang the jingle "Ooooh, I love Turtles" to a pair of turtle mascots.

She did not release any further music as a recording artist, but continued to have acting roles, including the musical Eight to the Bar, the stage play The Guys in the Truck, a regular role as a nightclub singer in the television series Flappers, and supporting roles in the films The Silent Partner, Stone Cold Dead and The Man in 5A.

In 1983 and 1984 she appeared in a production of Sugar Babies, first in Toronto, and subsequently on Broadway and in Boston. After concluding her run in that show she announced that she was moving to the United States to pursue work in Hollywood.

She subsequently married American musician Jon Bonine, but chose to pursue family life rather than continuing her career. She had a behind-the-scenes credit as a voice coach on the 1994 children's film The Little Rascals, but after the 1994 Northridge earthquake she and Bonine moved to Boise, Idaho, where she worked in music ministry for her church and performed in Bonine's swing jazz ensemble.
