= Death of Theresa Allore =

Canadian college student which remains a cold case

Theresa Allore
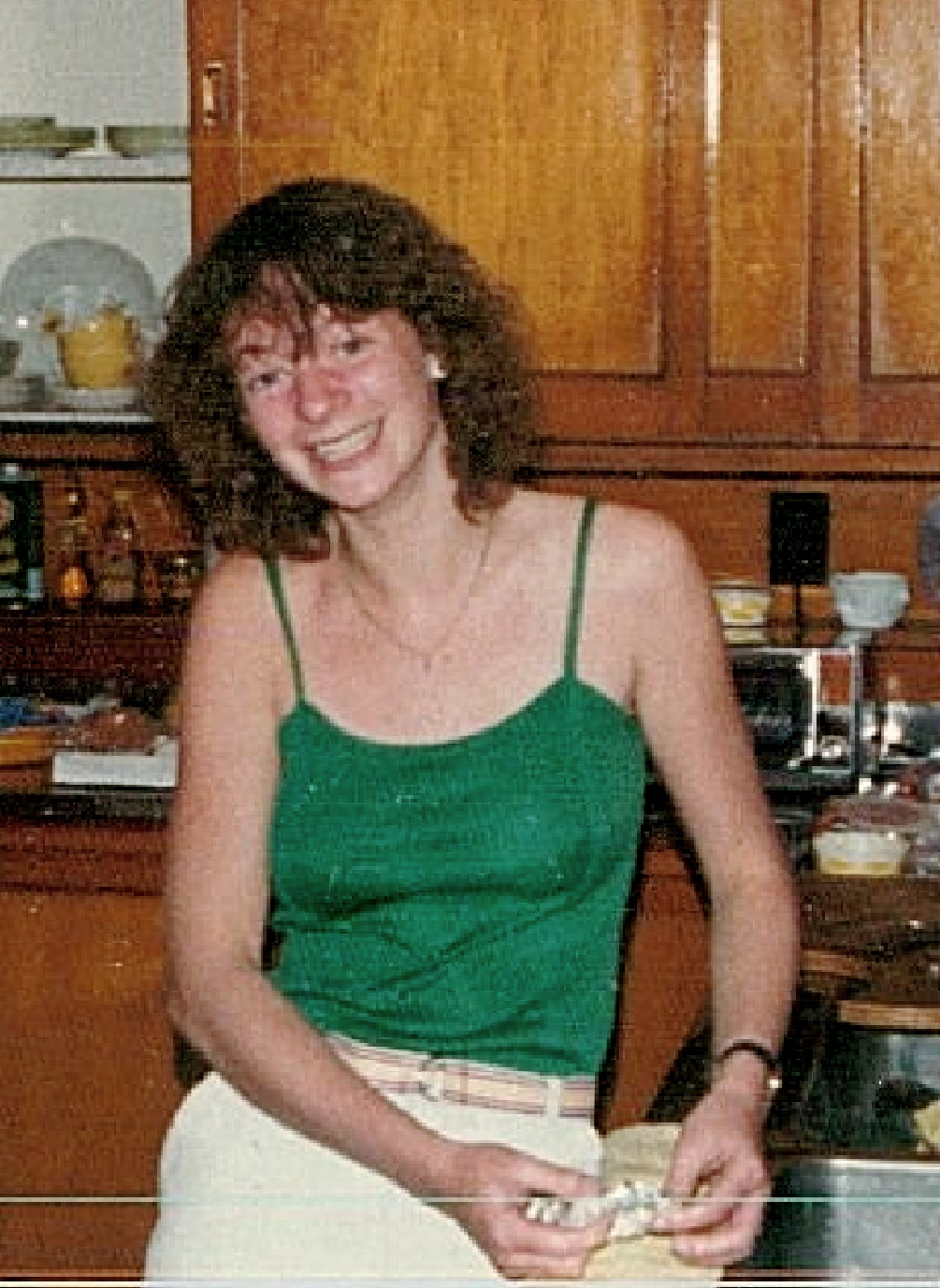
- Allore in 1978
- Disappeared: Lennoxville, Quebec, Canada
- Died: November 3, 1978 (aged 19)
- Body discovered: April 13, 1979, Compton, Quebec
- Known for: Unsolved death for 47 years, 6 months and 25 days
- Height: 1.66 m (5 ft 5 1/2 in)

Theresa Allore was a Canadian college student who disappeared on Friday, November 3, 1978, from Champlain College Lennoxville in the Eastern Townships of Quebec. She was later found dead under suspicious circumstances. Allore's brother later started the true crime podcast Who Killed Theresa.

The podcast started out as a personal exploration of Allore's death but later expanded its focus to cover other unsolved crimes. After discovering links between the circumstances of Allore's case and the close resemblance to the recent deaths of two other girls, Manon Dubé and Louise Camirand, Allore's brother theorized that the three deaths may have been committed by the same person.

== Circumstances ==
Allore was a 19-year-old student at Champlain College Lennoxville. Her lodgings were in Compton, a fifteen-minute drive south. On November 3, 1978, she disappeared from the campus. Five months later, on April 13, 1979, her body was discovered by a muskrat trapper in a small body of water approximately one kilometre from her dormitory residence in Compton, Quebec. She was wearing only her underwear.

The Allore family's anguish over the loss of their daughter was initially compounded by the laissez-faire attitude of officials at Champlain College and by police who investigated her disappearance and murder. Upon her disappearance, police initially suggested she was a runaway. When her body was discovered, police then suggested she was possibly the victim of a drug overdose, perhaps with the assistance of fellow college students.

== Developments ==
In the summer of 2002, the family of Allore enlisted the support of an investigative reporter and friend, Patricia Pearson, who produced a series of articles for Canada's National Post newspaper that presented evidence that she was a victim of murder, and that her death was possibly linked to multiple other unsolved local cases. Since 2002, Theresa's brother, John Allore, who produced the podcast Who Killed Theresa?, continued the investigation, identifying dozens of other unsolved murders and disappearances from 1971 to 1981 which may be associated. The theory was supported by geographic profiler and then FBI consultant, Kim Rossmo, who suggested a serial sexual predator may have been operating in the Quebec region in the late 1970s and advised police to investigate the deaths as a series.

Allore successfully lobbied for the creation of a Sûreté du Québec cold case unit, which was created in 2004. Beginning in 2018, John Allore started to focus on other Quebec cases from the 1970s through the present era, cases that further suggest systemic failures in Quebec criminal justice. On January 17, 2019, the Montreal police, the Service de police de la Ville de Montréal, announced it was creating its own cold case squad, in large part due to the lobbying efforts of John Allore. In November 2018, John Allore was awarded the Senate of Canada's Sesquicentennial Medal for his work in victims advocacy for "recognition of your valuable service to the nation." Allore and Pearson's book Wish You Were Here about the murder was published by Penguin Random House Canada in September 2020.

== See also ==
- List of solved missing person cases: 1950–1999
- List of unsolved murders (1900–1979)

== Literature ==
- Boisvenu, Pierre-Hugues (2008). Survivre à l'innommable et reprendre le pouvoir sur sa vie (in French). Montréal: Éditions de l'Homme. ISBN 978-2-7619-2314-9.
- Hanes, Allison (June 16, 2006). "Pattern points to serial rapist". National Post. Toronto.
- Rossmo, Kim, ed. (2009). Criminal Investigative Failures. Boca Raton, Florida: CRC Press. ISBN 978-1-4200-4751-6. OCLC 226966553.
- Wojna, Lisa (2009). Unsolved Murders of Canada. Edmonton: Quagmire Press. ISBN 978-0-9783409-5-7.
- "Who killed Theresa?". CTV News. March 14, 2005. Archived from the original on 4 July 2010.
