= Dr. Zonk and the Zunkins =

- Genre: Children's sitcom
- Starring: Robin Eveson; John Candy; Gilda Radner
- Country of origin: Canada
- Original language: English
- No. of seasons: 1

Production
- Executive producer: Don Elder
- Producer: Trevor Evans
- Running time: 30 minutes

Original release
- Network: CBC Television
- Release: 23 September 1974 – 14 April 1975

Dr. Zonk and the Zunkins is a CBC children's television series which ran three afternoons a week from 23 September 1974 to 14 April 1975.

Although the show was cancelled after one season, it was notable for the number of cast members who went on to successful careers. Some of the cast members were also seen in the following season on the CBC Television series Coming Up Rosie.

== Cast ==
- John Candy
- Robin Eveson (as Billy Meek)
- Dan Hennessey
- Bob McKenna
- Rosemary Radcliffe
- Gilda Radner
- Fiona Reid
- John Stocker

== Premise ==
The show centered on scenes set in the bedroom of a young boy named Billy Meek with robot/computer-like puppets called Zunkins named Zooey and Dunkin who would come to life each episode out of a comic book featuring the adventures of the never seen superhero Dr. Zonk. The rest of the cast were featured in randomly themed comedy sketches that the Zunkins would show to their human friend.

== Reception ==
A survey of 600 potential viewers found that the series was deemed childish and that viewership was being lost to competing American sitcoms. This led the producers to feature several of the performers in an entirely new series, Coming Up Rosie, based on a more conventional sitcom concept.
