= Doin' the Nasty =

Studio album by Slik Toxik
- Released: March 24, 1992
- Studios: Phase One, Toronto
- Genres: Hard rock Heavy metal Glam metal
- Length: 53:14
- Label: EMI
- Producers: Anthony Vanderburgh, Paul Gross

Slik Toxik chronology
Smooth and Deadly (1991)	Doin' the Nasty (1992)	Irrelevant (1994)

Singles from Doin' the Nasty
- 1. "Helluvatime" Released: 1992; 2. "By the Fireside" Released: 1992; 3. "White Lies, Black Truth" Released: 1992; 4. "Sweet Asylum" Released: 1992

Doin' the Nasty is the debut album by the Canadian hard rock band Slik Toxik. The album was released in 1992. The album reached No. 61 in Canada and was certified gold by the CRIA.

"Helluvatime", "By the Fireside", "White Lies, Black Truth", and "Sweet Asylum" were released as singles and they all had accompanying music videos.

The album won the 1993 Juno Award for "Best Rock Album of the Year". At the 1992 MuchMusic Video Awards, the "Helluvatime" video won the People's Choice Award for "Best Video of the Year" and "Best Metal Video Award".

== Critical reception ==
Professional ratings
Review scores
Source	Rating
AllMusic	2/5 stars
Calgary Herald	C+

The Calgary Herald wrote that "the music is lively and hard as nails but, yawn, these stories don`t accelerate toward any rush at all, let alone a big one."

== Track listing ==
- Lyrics by Dave Mercel. Music by Slik Toxik.
1. "Big Fuckin' Deal"
2. "Helluvatime"
3. "Sweet Asylum"
4. "White Lies, Black Truth"
5. "Cherry Bomb"
6. "Marionette"
7. "It's Not Easy"
8. "Crashed"
9. "By the Fireside"
10. "Blood Money"
11. "Cheap Nicotine"
12. "Midnight Grind"
13. "Rachel's Dead"

== Band members ==
- Nick Walsh – vocals
- Rob Bruce – guitar
- Kevin Gale – guitar
- Pat Howarth – bass
- Neal Busby – drums

== Charts ==
Chart (1992)	Peak position
Canada Top Albums/CDs (RPM)	61

== Certifications ==
Region	Certification	Certified units/sales
Canada (Music Canada)	Gold	50,000^{^}
^{^} Shipments figures based on certification alone.

== Awards ==
=== 1993 Juno Awards ===
Year	Nominee / work	Award	Result
1993	Slik Toxik	Most Promising Group	Nominated
1993	Doin' the Nasty	Best Rock Album of the Year	Won

=== MuchMusic Video Awards ===
Year	Nominee / work	Award	Result
1992	"Helluvatime"	Best Metal Video Award	Won
1992	"Helluvatime"	People's Choice Award: Best Video of the Year	Won
