= Apartment Hunting =

- Directed by: Bill Robertson
- Written by: Bill Robertson
- Produced by: Paul Barkin; Michael Coutanche (executive); Moira Holmes; Jennifer Kawaja (executive); Charlotte Mickie (executive); Julia Sereny (executive)
- Starring: Andrew Tarbet; Kari Matchett; Valérie Jeanneret; Matt Gordon; Rachel Hayward; Arnold Pinnock; John Evans; Tracy Wright; Mary Margaret O'Hara; Linda Kash; Ralph Benmergui; Rosemary Radcliffe; Elena Kudaba; Bill Lake; Oscar Hsu
- Cinematography: Derek Rogers
- Edited by: Wyeth Clarkson
- Music by: Mary Margaret O'Hara
- Production companies: Alcina Pictures; Apartment Hunting Productions Inc. Flat Rock Films
- Distributed by: Alliance Atlantis Communications
- Release date: 2000
- Running time: 89 minutes
- Country: Canada
- Language: English

Apartment Hunting is a 2000 Canadian romantic comedy film directed by Bill Robertson. Its soundtrack was the last full-length album released by Mary Margaret O'Hara after her 1988 debut album Miss America (Mary Margaret O'Hara album). She also appears in the film.

== Premise ==
Ben Riddick (Andrew Tarbet), an unhappily married journalist is forced to confront his feelings for his wife Sarah (Kari Matchett) when he is assigned by his employer to write a story about telephone personals services.

== Cast ==
- Andrew Tarbet as Ben Reddick
- Kari Matchett as Sarah
- Matt Gordon as Mac McConnell
- Tracy Wright as Steve
- Arnold Pinnock as Dean
- Rachel Hayward as Lola
- John Evans as Victor Spoils
- Mary Margaret O'Hara as Hellen
- Valérie Jeanneret as Celine / Annie
- Linda Kash as Realtor
- Ralph Benmergui as Thurston Peacock III
- Rosemary Radcliffe as Poncho Woman
- Elena Kudaba as Cabbage Woman
- Bill Lake as Lecherous Man
- Oscar Hsu as Landlord
