= Mary Margaret O'Hara =

Irish-Canadian singer-songwriter, actress and composer

- Origin: Toronto, Ontario, Canada
- Occupations: Singer; songwriter; producer; actress
- Instrument: Vocals
- Years active: 1984–present
- Label: Virgin

Mary Margaret O'Hara is a Canadian singer-songwriter, actress, and composer. She is best known for the album Miss America, released in 1988. She released one album under her own name, a film soundtrack that she made with collaborators, and a Christmas EP. She remains somewhat active as a live performer, as a contributor to compilation albums and as a guest collaborator on other artists' albums.

== Early life and education ==
O'Hara was born in Toronto, Ontario, to a family of Irish Catholic descent. One of her younger sisters was the comedic actress Catherine O'Hara (1954–2026). She studied at Ontario College of Art and Design (OCAD) in the 1970s.

== Music career ==
Growing up O'Hara's early musical tastes included Van Morrison, Dinah Washington, and her father's jazz records. She joined her first band, Dollars, after graduating from OCAD. In 1976 she joined Songship (later Go Deo Chorus) and wrote several of band's songs. She auditioned for the group at Jarvis House based on encouragement from her sister Catherine. The Go Geo Chorus broke up in 1983 and a year later O'Hara was signed as a solo artist by Virgin Records.

On March 17, 1978, she and her brother, Marcus O'Hara, started the Martian Awareness Ball, an event that continues every Saint Patrick's Day at the Horseshoe Tavern.

In addition, she did some work as a graphic artist, including lettering for the cover of Dalbello's album whomanfoursays.

=== Debut album ===
O'Hara recorded what would become her debut album Miss America in Wales over three weeks in December of 1984 but Virgin sat on the recordings, unhappy with the results The album was eventually released in 1988 following the remix of four songs by Michael Brook. Brook took on production work after seeing O'Hara in performance in 1987.\He ultimately added new vocals to and remixed material that had been originally recorded by Joe Boyd in 1984. At least one of the songs, "To Cry About", had been written as early as 1980.

According to the liner notes of a later reissue, six of the tracks were recorded in 1984, four in 1988, and one in 1983 and mixed later. O'Hara later reflected on the production experience, noting "I loved the Celtic crosses and the sheep rolling around the hills by the studio in Wales. But for Virgin to go from, 'You can do whatever you want', to 'What have you done?'—that was tough."

=== 1990s–2000s ===
On their 1990 album The Caution Horses, the Cowboy Junkies recorded a sparse, haunting version of O'Hara's song "You Will Be Loved Again". In 1991, O'Hara followed up with a four-song EP of Christmas material. Following the Christmas EP, O'Hara took on several acting roles including The Events Leading Up to My Death and appeared as a vocalist on recordings by a variety of other artists, including Morrissey ("November Spawned a Monster"), John & Mary, Bruce Cockburn, Holly Cole, Bob Wiseman, Meryn Cadell, The Henrys and Neko Case. The same year she performed as part of a tribute to Tim Buckley put together by Hal Willner which included Jeff Buckley, Syd Straw, Gary Lucas and The Horse Flies.

Over the course of her career, O'Hara has contributed songs to a number of compilation and tribute albums, and has performed at numerous events. In 1993 She appeared in a Christmas concert with Holly Cole, Rebecca Jenkins, Jane Siberry and Victoria Williams, and the songs were later was released as the album Count Your Blessings. She performed at John Candy's funeral in March of 1994. Her cover of Vic Chesnutt's song Florida was included on the 1996 benefit album Sweet Relief II: Gravity of the Situation. As well, she has occasionally performed in musical theatre, most notably productions of Tom Waits' experimental rock opera The Black Rider, stealing the show according to Pitchfork.com.

During an R.E.M. concert in Toronto in 1999, Michael Stipe brought O'Hara on stage and declared her a "national treasure". Other artists who are said to be fans include Kristin Hersh, Radiohead, Dave Matthews and Rickie Lee Jones. However, she did not release a new recording under her own name until 2001, when she and longtime guitarist Rusty McCarthy contributed to the soundtrack for the Canadian film Apartment Hunting (in which she also acted).

On October 4 and 5, 2006, O'Hara performed Leonard Cohen's "Hallelujah" (with Gavin Friday) and "The Window" at Came So Far For Beauty, the Leonard Cohen Tribute organised by Hal Willner at The Point Theatre in Dublin, Ireland. She performed at the All Tomorrow's Parties festival in Minehead, England, over the weekend of April 27 to 29, 2007, and with Howe Gelb and friends at the Barbican Centre in London on May 2, 2007.

O'Hara also performed at Toronto's Canwest Cabaret Festival in both 2008 and 2009. In 2008, she performed at tribute shows to Cohen, Weill and Duke Ellington, and in 2009, she participated in a musical improvisation show with Michael Snow and Aidan Closs. She also gave a rare radio interview to promote the 2009 show, appearing on CBC Radio One's Q on October 28 — and performing an impromptu duet of "Baby, It's Cold Outside" with host Jian Ghomeshi.

=== 2010s to present ===
O'Hara sings the theme song for the first two season's of the CBC's true-crime podcast Someone Knows Something, which was composed by Bob Wiseman

On November 12, 2017, O'Hara performed a rare live show at Le Guess Who? Festival in Utrecht, The Netherlands. O'Hara was invited by artist Perfume Genius who curated a program for the festival.

== Work with other artists and acting ==
She appeared in the 1985 film The Last Polka as Gerta Lemon, one third of the Lemon "Twins" singing duo alongside Robin Duke and sister Catherine as Sylvie Lemon.

In December 1989, she was featured in the Razorbacks' CBC Television Christmas special It's a Razorbacks Christmas Barbeque, for which she received a Gemini Award nomination for Best Performance in a Variety or Performing Arts Program or Series at the 5th Gemini Awards in 1990.

O'Hara sang backup vocals for Morrissey on his song "November Spawned a Monster". She contributed to four albums by Bob Wiseman: In Her Dream, Accidentally Acquired Beliefs, Theme and Variations, and Giulietta Masina At The Oscars Crying. She also contributed to Justin Rutledge's album No Never Alone. She recorded a duet with Tindersticks called "Peanuts", which appeared on their 2010 album Falling Down A Mountain. On May 15, 2009, in Toronto, Will Oldham brought her on stage to perform a cover of John Prine's "In Spite of Ourselves".

O'Hara has made several film appearances. She acts alongside Tom Waits in Candy Mountain (1986), directed by Robert Frank and Rudy Wurlitzer. O'Hara has a leading role in Museum Hours (2012), set in and around the Kunsthistorisches Museum, Vienna, directed by Jem Cohen.

In 2024, she performed the voice of classical violinist Kathleen Parlow in the film Measures for a Funeral.

In 2025, she recorded an improvised prologue to the album 'wounded' by John Oswald

== Tributes ==
Musician Steve Adey recorded a song titled "Mary Margaret O'Hara" on his 2006 LP All Things Real.

Adey also covered "To Cry About" on his 2017 LP Do Me a Kindness.

“Something To Cry About” in the short story collection Radium Girl by Sofi Papamarko was inspired by the song “To Cry About” and built around three prompts given to the author by the singer on request.

Bria Salmena recorded a cover of "When You Know Why You're Happy" on her 2023 EP Cuntry Covers, Vol. 2.

== Discography ==
=== Albums ===
- Miss America (1988)

=== Film Soundtracks ===
- The Events Leading Up to My Death (1991)
- Apartment Hunting (2001)

=== EPs ===
- Christmas EP (1991)

=== Singles ===
- This Is What I Want (2014)

=== Contributions ===
- Kip Hanrahan, Paul Haines – Darn It! (1993) - two songs with Gary Lucas to lyrics by Paul Haines
- John & Mary, The Weedkiller's Daughter (1993) - background vocals
- Count Your Blessings (1994) - collaborative concert with Jane Siberry, Holly Cole, Rebecca Jenkins and Victoria Williams
- Songs for My Mother and Father (1996) - guest vocal on Hugh Marsh album
- The Henrys, Puerto Angel (1996) - vocals on three songs, including "Dark Dear Heart"
- Sweet Relief II: Gravity of the Situation (1996) - "Florida"
- September Songs – The Music of Kurt Weill (1997) - "Fürchte dich nicht"
- O'Hara participated in some concerts of Hal Wilner's Harry Smith Project Revisited tour during 1999–2001. On the concert album, released in 2006, she performs the folk song "He Got Better Things for You" and on the accompanying DVD she can also be seen singing backing vocals to Gavin Friday's version of "When That Great Ship Went Down".
- Stormy Weather: The Music of Harold Arlen (2003) - "Blues in the Night"
- Dark Was the Night: A Tribute to the Music of Blind Willie Johnson (2004) – "God Moves on the Water"
- Rogue's Gallery: Pirate Ballads, Sea Songs, and Chanteys (2006) - "The Cry of Man"
- Tindersticks, Falling Down a Mountain (2010) - Guest vocal on "Peanuts"
- Garth Hudson Presents: A Canadian Celebration of The Band (2010) - "Out of the Blue"
- Blackie and the Rodeo Kings, Kings and Queens (2011) - "Heart a Mine"
- Son of Rogues Gallery: Pirate Ballads, Sea Songs & Chanteys (2013) - "Then Said the Captain to Me (Two Poems of the Sea)"
- The Hidden Cameras, Age (2014) - Guest vocals on "Gay Goth Scene"

== Filmography ==
Year	Title	Role	Other notes
1977	SCTV	Prisoner	Television series (appeared in one episode)
1985	The Last Polka	Gerta Lemon	Shmenge Brothers movie, starring John Candy, Eugene Levy and sister Catherine
1988	Candy Mountain	Darlene	
1991	The Events Leading Up to My Death	Rita	
2000	Apartment Hunting	Helen	
2003	Squeezebox	Vivienne	short film by Andrew Hull
2003	Youkali Hotel		Television film
2005	Mr Happy	Mother	Released in 2005 and 2006
2005	Black Widow	Elizabeth Peyton	
2012	Museum Hours	Anne	film by Jem Cohen
2016	The Rising	Mary MacDiarmada	film by Kevin McCann
2024	Measures for a Funeral	Kathleen Parlow	film by Sofia Bohdanowicz
