= King of Kensington =

Canadian television sitcom series

- Created by: Perry Rosemond
- Directed by: Ray Arsenault
- Starring: Al Waxman; Fiona Reid; Helene Winston; Rosemary Radcliffe; Jayne Eastwood
- Country of origin: Canada
- No. of seasons: 5
- No. of episodes: 111

Production
- Running time: 30 minutes

Original release
- Network: CBC Television
- Release: September 25, 1975 – March 13, 1980

King of Kensington is a Canadian television sitcom that aired on CBC Television from 1975 to 1980.

== Synopsis ==
Al Waxman starred as Larry King, a convenience store owner in Toronto's Kensington Market who was known for helping friends and neighbours solve problems. His multicultural group of friends consisted of Nestor Best (Ardon Bess), Max (John J. Dee), and Tony "Duke" Zarro (Bob Vinci), who hung around regularly to the perennial disapproval of King's mother Gladys (Helene Winston).

For the first three seasons, Fiona Reid played his wife Cathy. At the end of the third season, Reid decided to leave the series, so Larry and Cathy divorced. Larry then dated Tina (Rosemary Radcliffe) in the fourth season and Gwen Twining (Jayne Eastwood) in the fifth. At the same time, Larry sold the convenience store and took a new job with a youth community centre.

== Production ==
The show was created by Perry Rosemond, who also produced the first season. Other producers included Jack Humphrey (1976–1980) and Joe Partington (1978–1980). The original series pilot starred Paul Hecht and Sandra O'Neill as Larry and Cathy King, although the series was recast with Waxman and Reid by the time the show went into production.

The series featured many Canadian actors as guest stars, including Andrea Martin, Mike Myers, John Candy, Eugene Levy, Dave Thomas, Jeff Wincott and Mark Humphrey. The show was popular with viewers; prior to the start of the fourth season, one of the producers noted the show drew 1.5 to 1.8 million viewers weekly.

The show's gentle but politically conscious humour is seen by some critics as a Canadian version of the topical Norman Lear sitcoms of the 1970s, such as All in the Family and Maude. The series maintained a tight production schedule, with episodes sometimes airing just one week or less after they were filmed, so that topical jokes about current news stories could be incorporated into the scripts.

The series was syndicated to some American stations during the height of its popularity.

After King of Kensington ended in 1980, many of the producers went on to create the new CBC sitcom Hangin' In, while head writer Louis Del Grande went on to create and star in Seeing Things, and Waxman was cast in the American series Cagney & Lacey.

== Cast ==
- Al Waxman as Larry King
- Helene Winston as Gladys King
- Fiona Reid as Cathy King (1975–1978)
- Ardon Bess as Nestor Best (1975–1978)
- Bob Vinci as Tony "Duke" Zarro (1975–1978)
- John J. Dee as Max (1975–1978)
- Jayne Eastwood as Gwen Twining (1978–1980)
- Peter Boretski as Jack Soble (1978–1980)
- Robert Haley as Ron Bacon (1978–1980)
- Rosemary Radcliffe as Tina (1978–1980)
- Linda Rennhofer as Dorothy (1978–1980)

== Episode list ==
=== Season 1 (1975–76) ===
No. overall	No. in season	Title	Directed by	Written by	Original release date
1	1	"Variety Store"	Unknown	Unknown	September 28, 1975
2	2	"Hot Line Host"	Unknown	Unknown	October 2, 1975
3	3	"Kensington Achievement Award"	Unknown	Unknown	October 9, 1975
4	4	"The Tax Audit"	Unknown	Unknown	October 23, 1975
5	5	"Save Old George"	Unknown	Unknown	October 30, 1975
6	6	"Where's Cathy?"	Unknown	Unknown	November 6, 1975
7	7	"Half-Way Home" (ft Eugene Levy)	Unknown	Unknown	November 13, 1975
8	8	"The Lady Who Came to Dinner"	Unknown	Unknown	November 20, 1975
9	9	"The Joy of Kensington" (ft Andrea Martin)	Unknown	Unknown	November 27, 1975
10	10	"The Gambler" (ft Saul Rubinek & Luba Goy)	Unknown	Unknown	December 4, 1975
11	11	"The Real Mrs. King"	Unknown	Unknown	December 11, 1975
12	12	"Scout's Honour" (ft Mike Myers)	Unknown	Unknown	December 18, 1975
13	13	"The Christmas Show"	Unknown	Unknown	December 25, 1975
14	14	"The Detroit Story" (ft Dave Thomas)	Unknown	Unknown	January 15, 1976
15	15	"Cathy's Hobby"	Unknown	Unknown	January 22, 1976
16	16	"Duke's Dilemma"	Unknown	Unknown	January 29, 1976
17	17	"Delma's Decision"	Unknown	Unknown	February 5, 1976
18	18	"Happy Anniversary"	Unknown	Unknown	February 12, 1976

=== Season 2 (1976–77) ===
No. overall	No. in season	Title	Directed by	Written by	Original release date
19	1	"Fertility for Two"	Gary Plaxton	Jack Humphrey & Louis Del Grande	September 21, 1976
20	2	"The Partners"	Sheldon Larry	Jack Humphrey & Louis Del Grande	September 28, 1976
21	3	"The Checkup"	Unknown	Unknown	October 5, 1976
22	4	"The Dancer"	Unknown	Unknown	October 12, 1976
23	5	"Delma's Fur"	Unknown	Unknown	October 26, 1976
24	6	"The Reunion"	Unknown	Unknown	November 9, 1976
25	7	"Gestalt of Kensington"	Unknown	Unknown	November 16, 1976
26	8	"Welcome to Canada"	Unknown	Unknown	November 23, 1976
27	9	"The Friend"	Unknown	Unknown	November 30, 1976
28	10	"Duke's New Job"	Unknown	Unknown	December 7, 1976
29	11	"Prisoner of Kensington"	Unknown	Unknown	December 14, 1976
30	12	"The Holiday"	Unknown	Unknown	December 28, 1976
31	13	"The End of the World"	Unknown	Unknown	January 4, 1977
32	14	"The Lottery"	Unknown	Unknown	January 11, 1977
33	15	"Gladys' Teddy Bear"	Unknown	Unknown	January 18, 1977
34	16	"Bunny of Kensington"	Unknown	Unknown	January 25, 1977
35	17	"Mary Theresa Is Missing"	Unknown	Unknown	February 1, 1977
36	18	"Cathy's Parents"	Unknown	Unknown	February 8, 1977
37	19	"The Central Tech Tiger"	Unknown	Unknown	February 15, 1977
38	20	"The Crush"	Unknown	Unknown	February 22, 1977
39	21	"Tiny's Job"	Unknown	Unknown	March 1, 1977
40	22	"Gladys' Problem"	Unknown	Unknown	March 8, 1977
41	23	"The Quiz Show"	David Main	Anna Sandor	March 15, 1977
42	24	"The Big Shot"	Unknown	Unknown	March 22, 1977

=== Season 3 (1977–78) ===
No. overall	No. in season	Title	Directed by	Written by	Original release date
43	1	"Cathy's New Career"	Ray Arsenault	Anna Sandor	September 25, 1977
44	2	"The Comic"	Unknown	Unknown	October 9, 1977
45	3	"The Prom"	Unknown	Unknown	October 16, 1977
46	4	"The Hostage"	Unknown	Unknown	October 23, 1977
47	5	"The Boiler"	Unknown	Unknown	October 30, 1977
48	6	"Hotel Buffalo"	Unknown	Unknown	November 6, 1977
49	7	"The Photographer"	Unknown	Unknown	November 13, 1977
50	8	"The Teacher"	Unknown	Unknown	November 20, 1977
51	9	"The Move"	Unknown	Unknown	November 27, 1977
52	10	"Gladys' Restaurant"	Unknown	Unknown	December 4, 1977
53	11	"The Hero"	Unknown	Unknown	December 11, 1977
54	12	"The Dance Studio"	Unknown	Unknown	December 18, 1977
55	13	"The Suitor"	Unknown	Unknown	January 8, 1978
56	14	"The Hustler"	Unknown	Unknown	January 22, 1978
57	15	"The Wizard"	Unknown	Unknown	January 29, 1978
58	16	"Big Daddy"	Unknown	Unknown	February 5, 1978
59	17	"The Racehorse"	Ray Arsenault	Dennis Shadlyn & Robin Herman	February 12, 1978
60	18	"The Dukedom"	Unknown	Unknown	February 19, 1978
61	19	"Las Vegas"	Unknown	Unknown	February 26, 1978
62	20	"Old Flame"	Unknown	Unknown	March 5, 1978
63	21	"King's Cousin"	Unknown	Unknown	March 12, 1978
64	22	"The Blood of Kings"	Unknown	Unknown	March 19, 1978
65	23	"Cathy's Last Stand"	Alan Erlich	George Allan, Harvey Patterson & Anna Sandor	March 26, 1978

=== Season 4 (1978–79) ===
No. overall	No. in season	Title	Directed by	Written by	Original release date
66	1	"King's First Date"	Unknown	Unknown	September 28, 1978
67	2	"Summer of '56"	Unknown	Unknown	October 5, 1978
68	3	"School Daze"	Unknown	Unknown	October 12, 1978
69	4	"The Invitation"	Unknown	Unknown	October 19, 1978
70	5	"Words and Music"	Unknown	Unknown	October 26, 1978
71	6	"Carol's Arrival"	Unknown	Unknown	November 2, 1978
72	7	"Double Standard"	Unknown	Unknown	November 9, 1978
73	8	"The Pursesnatcher"	Unknown	Unknown	November 16, 1978
74	9	"Third Party"	Unknown	Unknown	December 7, 1978
75	10	"Big Brother"	Unknown	Unknown	December 14, 1978
76	11	"A Xmas Story"	Unknown	Unknown	December 21, 1978
77	12	"The Houseguest"	Unknown	Unknown	December 28, 1978
78	13	"With This Ring"	Unknown	Unknown	January 4, 1979
79	14	"Guido's Job"	Unknown	Unknown	January 11, 1979
80	15	"Over the Hill"	Unknown	Unknown	January 18, 1979
81	16	"Dear Aunt Martha"	Unknown	Unknown	January 25, 1979
82	17	"The Best Man"	Unknown	Unknown	February 1, 1979
83	18	"Hockey Night in Kensington"	Unknown	Unknown	February 15, 1979
84	19	"True Confessions"	Unknown	Unknown	February 22, 1979
85	20	"Mr. King Goes to Ottawa"	Unknown	Unknown	March 8, 1979
86	21	"White Lace Gloves"	Unknown	Unknown	March 15, 1979
87	22	"The Fishing Trip"	Unknown	Unknown	March 22, 1979
88	23	"Cyrano de Kensington"	Unknown	Unknown	March 29, 1979

=== Season 5 (1979–80) ===
No. overall	No. in season	Title	Directed by	Written by	Original release date
89	1	"King's Brave New World"	Unknown	Unknown	September 13, 1979
90	2	"Diabolical Plots"	Unknown	Unknown	September 20, 1979
91	3	"Life Begins at Forty"	Unknown	Unknown	September 27, 1979
92	4	"The Hat Trick"	Unknown	Unknown	October 4, 1979
93	5	"Home Is Where the Heartburn Is"	Unknown	Unknown	October 11, 1979
94	6	"The Rivals"	Unknown	Unknown	October 25, 1979
95	7	"Born to Boogie"	Unknown	Unknown	November 1, 1979
96	8	"The Double Date"	Unknown	Unknown	November 8, 1979
97	9	"Masters and Johnson and King"	Unknown	Unknown	November 15, 1979
98	10	"The Bet"	Unknown	Unknown	November 22, 1979
99	11	"Pawn to King Four"	Unknown	Unknown	November 29, 1979
100	12	"Down But Not Out"	Unknown	Unknown	December 6, 1979
101	13	"Catch 23"	Unknown	Unknown	December 20, 1979
102	14	"The Total Woman"	Unknown	Unknown	January 3, 1980
103	15	"Look Ma, No Cavities"	Unknown	Unknown	January 10, 1980
104	16	"Sign of the Bull"	Unknown	Unknown	January 17, 1980
105	17	"The Spirit of Joy"	Unknown	Unknown	January 24, 1980
106	18	"Good News, Bad News"	Unknown	Unknown	January 31, 1980
107	19	"War and Peace"	Unknown	Unknown	February 7, 1980
108	20	"Counter Attack"	Unknown	Unknown	February 21, 1980
109	21	"Green Eyed Monster"	Unknown	Unknown	February 28, 1980
110	22	"Purple Passion"	Unknown	Unknown	March 6, 1980
111	23	"Movin' On"	Unknown	Unknown	March 13, 1980

== Tributes ==
In the SCTV episode "CCCP1-Russian television", one of the fake TV programs infiltrating the network is Hey Giorgy, about "everyone's favorite Cossack", intended as a Russian knockoff of King of Kensington.

In the first episode of the 1990s television series Twitch City, also set in Kensington, the character Nathan (played by Daniel MacIvor) was sent to prison for killing a homeless man with a can of cat food. The producers of Twitch City cast Al Waxman in the role of the murder victim, as a symbolic wink to King of Kensington, although they claimed that they did not intend for the character to be seen as Larry King himself.

In the late 1990s, This Hour Has 22 Minutes featured a sketch detailing the making of a film version of King of Kensington. In the sketch, director Atom Egoyan (played by Greg Thomey), re-imagines the series as a surreal crime thriller, with Larry King as a serial killer instead of a convenience store owner.

Following Waxman's death on January 18, 2001, a memorial to him was erected in Kensington Market.

In one episode of the Canadian comedy program Puppets Who Kill, the character Bill steals Al Waxman's preserved brain from CBC headquarters.

== Home media ==
On November 13, 2007, Morningstar Entertainment released King of Kensington – Season One on DVD in Region 1.
