= Fiona Reid =

British actress (born 1951)

Fiona Reid CM
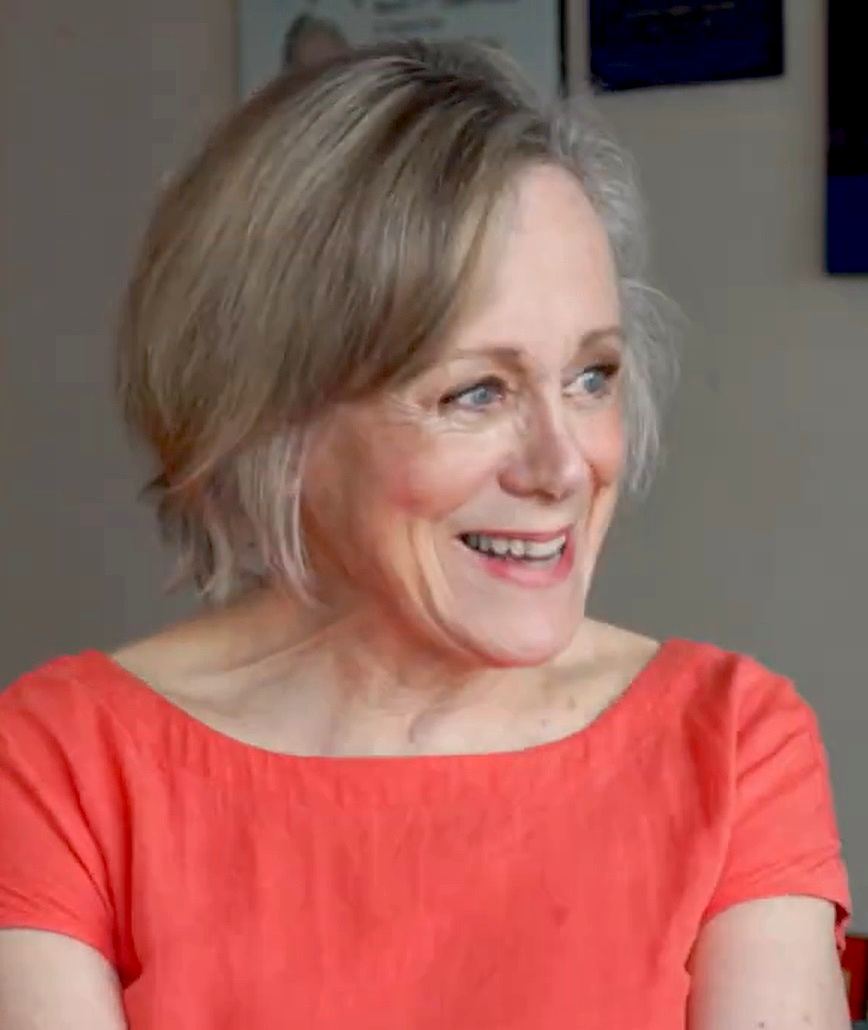
- Reid in 2024
- Born: 24 July 1951 (age 75); Whitstable, Kent, England
- Occupation: Actress
- Years active: 1974–present
- Spouse: McCowan Thomas (m. 1977)
- Children: 2

Fiona Reid, CM (born 24 July 1951) is a British-Canadian actress. She is best known for playing Cathy King in the CBC sitcom King of Kensington (1975–1978) and Harriet Miller in the film My Big Fat Greek Wedding (2002).

== Early life and education ==
Reid was born in Whitstable, Kent, England. Her father was a doctor in the British Army. As a teenager, she lived in Germany, Africa, and the U.S. before settling in Canada with her family in 1964, when she was aged 12.

She studied acting at McGill University in Montreal, receiving a Bachelor of Arts degree in 1972, and at the Banff Centre for the Arts. While at McGill, with Guy Sprung and Ian D. Clark she acted on stage with a youth troupe called Theatre Encounter in Montreal.

== Career ==
Reid performed in theatres for five seasons with the Stratford Festival, and twelve seasons at the Shaw Festival, as well as theatres in Great Britain and the U.S.

From 1975 to 1978, Reid starred as Cathy King, the wife of Al Waxman's character Larry King, in the CBC Television sitcom King of Kensington. Cathy, an Anglo-Canadian married to the Jewish owner of a convenience store in Toronto's multicultural Kensington Market, was one of the programme's principal characters during its first three seasons. Reid received an ACTRA Award for her performance in the series. Her association with the programme remained prominent throughout her career; her citation as a Member of the Order of Canada later identified King of Kensington alongside her work at the Stratford and Shaw festivals and the Canadian Stage Company.

Reid chose to leave King of Kensington after its third season because she wanted to return to theatre. Her departure was incorporated into the series rather than having Cathy recast. In the episode "Cathy's Last Stand", Cathy leaves Larry after concluding that, although she still loves him, his devotion to helping other people has left too little room for their marriage. Reid later recalled that viewers continued to reproach her for leaving the programme. In a 2011 interview, she expressed lingering ambivalence about the decision, saying that she had been too young at the time to fully appreciate the series and had "never quite got over" the depth of the bond it created with its audience. She said the experience convinced her that Canadian audiences wanted to see Canadian performers and stories on television.

Reid subsequently concentrated heavily on stage work. Over her career, her performances have garnered her two Dora Mavor Moore awards, a Jessie Award (Vancouver), and a Sterling Award (Edmonton) in 2011.

Her stage roles have included Rose in The Children, Amanda Wingfield in The Glass Menagerie, Julie in London Road, Blanche DuBois in A Streetcar Named Desire, Lady Bracknell in The Importance of Being Earnest, Martha in Who's Afraid of Virginia Woolf?, Mrs. Lovett in Sweeney Todd: The Demon Barber of Fleet Street, Hedda Gabler and Claire in A Delicate Balance. Her film credits include My Big Fat Greek Wedding, One Week, and The Time Traveler's Wife.

In 2016, Reid starred as Queen Elizabeth II in the Mirvish Productions presentation of The Audience at the Royal Alexandra Theatre in Toronto.

In 2019, she joined the Broadway production of Harry Potter and the Cursed Child.

== Personal life ==
Reid met McCowan Thomas doing summer stock theatre and married him in 1977. They have two children.

== Filmography ==
Year	Title	Role	Notes
1974–1975	Dr. Zonk and the Zunkins	–	Television series
1975–1976	Coming Up Rosie	Mona Swicker	Television series
1975–1978	King of Kensington	Cathy	ACTRA Award for Best Performance in a Continuing Role in a Television Program
1978	Witch's Night Out	Nicely	Voice
1980	Hot Dogs	Mrs. Frappier	
1982	An Honourable Member	Trish Baldwin	
1987	Heaven on Earth	Abigail	
1988	Switching Channels	Pamela Farbrother	
1988	Milk and Honey		
1990	Friday the 13th: The Series	Dr. Cynthia Galen	Episode: "Midnight Riders"
1990	Road to Avonlea	Mrs. Craig	Episode: "Conversions"
1992	Beethoven Lives Upstairs	Mother	
1992–2000	Noddy's Toyland Adventures	Mrs. Tubby Bear, Mrs. Noah (voices)	US version
1996	Any Mother's Son	Doris	TV film
1998–2000	Noddy	Charlene VonPickings	4 episodes
1998	At the End of the Day: The Sue Rodriguez Story	Sandra Burtch	
2000	Timothy Goes to School	Mrs. Jenkins	Voice
2000	Marvin the Tap-Dancing Horse	Diamonds	Voice
2000	PR	Deirdre Duncan	Television series
2002–2004	RoboRoach	Additional voices	Television series
2002	Duct Tape Forever	Judge Hanson	
2002	My Big Fat Greek Wedding	Harriet Miller	Nominated – Screen Actors Guild Award for Outstanding Performance by a Cast in a Motion Picture
2002	Henry's World	Doris	Voice
2003	Jacob Two-Two	Ms. Sourpickle	Television series
2003	Luck	Mom	
2004	Prom Queen: The Marc Hall Story	Lucinda Pilcher	TV movie
2008	One Week	Mary Tyler	
2009	The Time Traveler's Wife	Lucile Abshire	Film
2010	Haven	Piper Landon	Television series
2016	My Big Fat Greek Wedding 2	Harriet Miller	Film
2018	Bravest Warriors	Slippy Napkins	Voice; Season 4
2018	Trouble in the Garden	Lillian	
2018–2022	Chateau Laurier	Mrs. Bracebridge	Web series
2021	Royally Wrapped for Christmas	Regina Reyna	TV movie
