= Irrelevant (album) =

Studio album by Slik Toxik
- Released: 1994
- Studio: Phase One Recording Studios
- Genre: Hard rock Heavy metal Glam metal
- Label: Strawberry; A&M Records
- Producer: Paul Gross

Slik Toxik chronology
Doin' the Nasty (1992)	Irrelevant (1994)

Singles from Irrelevant
- 1. "Twenty Something" Released: 1994; 2. "Dive" Released: 1994

Irrelevant is the second album by the Canadian hard rock band Slik Toxik. The album was released in 1994. "Twenty Something" and "Dive" were released as singles.

The album was recorded at Toronto Studio Phase One. The album contains 12 tracks with overall runtime of about an hour. The album was re-released circa 2015, for its 20th anniversary.

== Track listing ==
1. "Twenty Something"
2. "Kill the Pain"
3. "Voodoo"
4. "Drained"
5. "I Wanna Gun"
6. "Liquid Calm"
7. "Fashioned After None"
8. "Dive"
9. "Blue Monday"
10. "EMI"
11. "Mother Machine"
12. "Just Fade Away"

== Band members ==
- Nicholas Walsh - Lead Vocals
- Kevin Gale - Guitar
- Rob Bruce - Guitar
- Adam Headland - Bass
- Neal Busby - Drums
- Dave Mercel - Lyrics
