= Rosemary Radcliffe =

Canadian actress

- Born: 1949 (age 76–77); Ontario, Canada
- Education: Ryerson Polytechnical Institute
- Occupations: Actress; writer; composer; painter
- Years active: 1971–present

Rosemary Radcliffe (born 1949) is a Canadian comic actress, writer, composer and painter. She graduated from Ryerson Polytechnical Institute in Toronto, then began her television career on Sunday Morning at CBLT Toronto.

== Career ==
She performed in cabaret and theatre productions across Canada and then appeared in the off-Broadway production of Leonard Cohen's Sisters of Mercy, an anthology of the Montreal poet's songs and poetry.

During the 1970s, she was a member of The Second City comedy troupe performing in Toronto and Chicago. From 1975 to 1978, she played the title character in the CBC Television children's show Coming Up Rosie.

In 1980 and 1981, Radcliffe toured Canada with two revivals of the venerable revue Spring Thaw. In 1982, Skin Deep, the musical show she composed (libretto written by Nika Rylski) won the Eric Harvie award for best new Canadian musical and was presented for the summer on the main stage at the Charlottetown Festival. The story of a beauty pageant, the musical offered four separate endings, enabling the audience to vote for their favourite beauty contestant.

Radcliffe spent a season starring as Tina, the King of Kensington's sweetheart, playing opposite Al Waxman on the popular CBLT television series.

She also created the role of Mrs. Barry in Kevin Sullivan's successful series Anne of Green Gables, Anne of Green Gables: the Sequel, and Anne of Green Gables, The Continuing Story.

Radcliffe originated the role of the disillusioned wife and mother in Ken Finkleman's Married Life (nominated for an ensemble Genie award), and played the fragmented "Mom" in Bill Robertson's movie The Events Leading Up to My Death, a role Now Magazine pronounced "brilliantly played". Her most recent movie is The Untitled Work of Paul Shepard, a Canadian independent film, produced by Anthony Grani, which appeared at film festivals in 2010.

== Filmography ==
- 1974–1975: Dr. Zonk and the Zunkins (series)
- 1975–1978: Coming Up Rosie, as Rosie Tucker (series)
- 1978–1979: King of Kensington, as Tina Olsen
- 1985: Anne of Green Gables (TV film)

== Theatre writing ==
- 1982: Skin Deep (written with Nika Rylski)
