= Maria Del Mar (singer) =

Canadian singer (born 1966)

- Born: Maria Morales; 1965 or 1966 (age 59–60); Spain
- Origin: Toronto, Ontario, Canada
- Genres: Rock
- Occupation: Singer
- Years active: 1985 to 1996
- Labels: Capitol Records, EMI
- Formerly of: National Velvet, Hässenpfeffer

Maria Morales (born c. 1966), known professionally as Maria Del Mar, is a Canadian rock singer.

She was the lead vocalist of the 1980s and 1990s rock band National Velvet.

== Early life ==
Del Mar was born in Spain, where she lived until 18 months of age. As a child she danced in Spanish cultural shows and enjoyed holding public singing performances in her neighbourhood. At the age of 15, she dropped out of high school and moved to Vancouver. She later worked as a cigarette girl at Toronto nightclubs, such as RPM and The Copa. She also worked as a coat-check girl at The Diamond, where fellow National Velvet band member, Tim Welch, once worked as well.

== Career ==
Del Mar met bassist Mark Storm in 1984 in a Toronto alleyway outside of party, where the two had a heated discussion about music. Storm asked Del Mar to be a backing vocalist in the band that he was part of at the time. The following year Del Mar and Storm formed National Velvet along with drummer Gary Flint, and guitarists Mark Crossley and Tim Welch.

Del Mar was noted for her energetic performances and goth-like image. She had a powerful presence, bolstered by her height, and was often dressed in black, sometimes in leather, with jet-black hair. She would dance wildly, often kicking into the air, sometimes climbing into the audience. Del Mar's strong, deep, vocal style was compared to artists such as Patti Smith, Carole Pope, Siouxsie Sioux and Nina Hagen. Journalists referred to her by such descriptions as a "raven-haired vamp", "Amazonian vamp', "gothic Cher", "post-goth vampirella" and "6-foot-tall dominatrix."

Del Mar provided backing vocals on the track "Blonde in the Bleachers", a Joni Mitchell cover song featuring the musician, Squiddly, from the 1992 tribute album Back to the Garden. After National Velvet's dissolution, Del Mar joined the all-female indie rock band, Hässenpfeffer. In 1996 they released the album, Songs of Convenience on the label MaGaDa Int'l.

Del Mar is sometimes confused with Canadian television and film actress Maria del Mar who was in the cast of the Canadian television series Street Legal, a popular series whose original run coincided with National Velvet's tenure. Del Mar (the vocalist) also played a role in the 1991 film The Events Leading Up to My Death, furthering the confusion.
