= Apartment Hunting (album) =

Soundtrack album by Mary Margaret O'Hara
- Released: 2001

Mary Margaret O'Hara chronology
Christmas EP (1991)	Apartment Hunting (2001)

Apartment Hunting is a 2001 album by Mary Margaret O'Hara. It was composed and released as a soundtrack album for the 2000 film Apartment Hunting.

== Critical reception ==
Professional ratings
Review scores
Source	Rating
AllMusic	4/5 stars

AllMusic stated: "The tracks by O'Hara herself are more jazzy than before, and while the vocals are certainly more staid in places, a few tracks show her cutting loose, old style, like she was possessed and trying to cast out her demons by forcing them out through her lungs."

== Track listing ==
All tracks are written by Mary Margaret O'Hara except where noted.

No.	Title	Writer(s)	Length
1.	"Was You"		2:04
2.	"Never Came Back Again"	O'Hara, Matt Horner, Michael Sloski, Russell Boswell, Rusty McCarthy	4:53
3.	"Rain"	Celina Carroll, Chip Yearwood, O'Hara	2:59
4.	"Dream I Had (I)"		3:44
5.	"Ay Candela!"	Blair Martin	3:25
6.	"Be a Man (Fallin')"	Bill Robertson	3:13
7.	"Scary Latin Love Song"		1:45
8.	"If You See My Love (I)"		1:56
9.	"I Don't Care"		4:26
10.	"Woo-Hoo"	Robertson, McCarthy	1:10
11.	"Have You Gone"		6:30
12.	"Apartment of Cheese Suite"		4:12
13.	"Love Will Take Its Time"		3:38
14.	"If You See My Love (II)"		1:54
15.	"Chez le Nez Suite"	O'Hara, Horner, Sloski, McCarthy	8:19
16.	"Dream I Had (II)"		2:18
17.	"Hello Yellow Goose (Burning Dog)"		1:07

== Personnel ==
- Mary Margaret O'Hara – vocals
- Michael White – trumpet
- Phil Dwyer – clarinet, saxophone
- Matt Horner – piano, keyboards
- Dennis Keldie – accordion
- Chip Yearwood – guitar
- Rusty McCarthy – guitar
- Louis Simao – bass
- Russ Boswell – bass
- Mike Sloski – drums
- Celina Carroll – percussion, vocals
- Bill Robertson – vocals, acoustic guitar
