= John Allore =

Canadian actor and podcaster (1964–2023)

Jonathan Allore (February 4, 1964 – March 30, 2023), usually credited as John Allore, was a Canadian actor and podcaster, most noted for his true crime podcast Who Killed Theresa. The podcast started out as a personal exploration of the Death of Theresa Allore, his sister, and later expanded its focus to cover other unsolved crimes.

== Background ==
Born in Trenton, Ontario, Allore was raised principally in Saint John, New Brunswick, where he dated journalist Patricia Pearson in high school. He was 14 years old when his older sister Theresa was murdered in 1978 in Sherbrooke, Quebec, soon after starting college studies at Champlain College.

== Acting career ==
After graduating from Trinity College at the University of Toronto, Allore worked as an actor in the early 1990s, with a major role as Angus Snack in the 1991 film The Events Leading Up to My Death. He subsequently moved to the United States to work in Hollywood, where he had supporting roles in the films Trapped in Paradise and A Pyromaniac's Love Story, and a guest role in the television series Dawson's Creek, but later left acting and moved to Durham, North Carolina, where he took a job in the accounting department of the city government and pursued a master's degree in public administration.

== Victim advocacy and podcasting ==
In the early 2000s, Allore enlisted Pearson's help to investigate his sister's death, and advocated for the Sûreté du Québec to reopen the case. After finding substantial evidence that she may have been murdered by a serial killer, he became prominent as a victim's rights advocate, including advocating for the creation of a provincial cold case squad, launching a memorial scholarship in Theresa's name at Champlain College, and being interviewed for Cal Millar's book Find My Killer: Unsolved Homicides.

He worked with senator Pierre-Hugues Boisvenu on the 2013 Victims Bill of Rights.

He launched the podcast Who Killed Theresa in 2017, starting out covering his sister's death and later expanding to cover other unsolved crimes.

In 2018, he was awarded the Senate of Canada's Sesquicentennial Medal for his work in victims advocacy.

He and Pearson coauthored the 2020 book Wish You Were Here: A Murdered Girl, a Brother's Quest and the Hunt for a Serial Killer. In 2022, he became budget director for the city of Durham.

== Death ==
On March 30, 2023, Allore died after being hit by a car while cycling. He had just recently been interviewed for an episode of the Global Television Network's crime newsmagazine series Crime Beat, and the episode was advanced from its original planned broadcast date to immediately air the day his death was announced.
