= Classic Albums Live =

Concert series based in Ontario, Canada

Classic Albums Live is a concert series based in Toronto, Ontario, in which musicians perform a classic rock album in its entirety. The series was founded in 2003 by Craig Martin, a musician who had previously produced a series of boutique cabaret shows as well as composed music for television and film. The company produces approximately 150 shows annually across the United States and Canada, occasionally staging multiple performances on the same day.

== History ==
Before founding Classic Albums Live, Martin sang lead for a Rolling Stones cover band. However, he felt that cover bands were “concerned with putting on a great show,” rather than focusing on the quality of the music. This led him to form a company focused exclusively on performing albums “note for note, cut for cut,” which is the company slogan.

== Format and Style ==
The musicians aim to faithfully recreate every sound on the original album. They have performed with orchestras, sitarists, choirs and schools. Unlike many tribute bands that aim to emulate the style and stage presence of original artists, CAL adopts a neutral aesthetic, presenting shows as recital-style performances. The musicians follow an all-black dress code and do not speak between songs so as to preserve the original listening experience, with the album being performed in its entirety, followed by a second set featuring the 'greatest hits' of the featured artist.

== Geographical reach ==
In recent years, the series has presented concerts in a variety of cities across the United States and Canada, including Orlando, Florida; Los Angeles, California; Philadelphia, Pennsylvania; Akron, Ohio; New York City, New York; Dallas, Texas; Houston, Texas; Uncasville, Connecticut; Wilmington, Delaware; Raleigh, North Carolina; Las Vegas, Nevada; and many others. As of September 2025, the series plans to expand to the United Kingdom, beginning with the Beatles’ White Album.

== Musicians ==
A different line-up of musicians performs each album. There is a group of core musicians who are frequently part of the performances, across a variety of albums, including Rob Phillips, Lindsay Clark, Ryan Granville-Martin, Troy Feener, Clifton Broadbridge, Dom Polito, Des Leahy, and Alex McMaster, among others. The lineup of musicians on a given album rotates based on availability. There is also a group of core musicians based in and around Florida as a result of a higher volume of CAL shows scheduled there. Some of these musicians include Nick Hildyard, Shain Honkonen, Francisco A. Salcedo II, and Antonio Exposito.In some venues, they will bring in local guest musicians or groups to fill needed spots. For example, when performing the Beatles’ Sgt. Pepper album, they often bring in a city’s local symphony or philharmonic orchestra to fill in on the orchestral parts.

== Venues ==
Venue sizes vary across CAL performances, with most ranging from approximately 350 seats, such as the Wolf Den at the Mohegan Sun in Uncasville, CT, to 7000 seats, such as the Hard Rock Live in Hollywood, FL. When performing in Toronto, they usually play at Massey Hall or Roy Thomson Hall. They have also performed at several notable venues across the United States and Canada, including the National Arts Center in Ottawa, ON, the Florida Theatre in Jacksonville, FL, and the Wolf Trap in Vienna, VA.

== Notable Performances ==
On 17 December 2006, Classic Albums Live performed the entire 213-song Beatles song catalogue in one 13-hour concert at the Phoenix Concert Theatre in Toronto.

== List of albums performed ==
- The Beatles' catalogue
- Led Zeppelin
- Led Zeppelin II
- Led Zeppelin IV
- Houses of the Holy
- Physical Graffiti
- In Through the Out Door
- Meddle
- The Dark Side of the Moon
- Animals
- Wish You Were Here
- The Wall
- A Night at the Opera
- News of the World
- Who's Next
- Are You Experienced
- Boston
- Crime of the Century
- Breakfast in America
- The Last Waltz
- Rust Never Sleeps
- Harvest
- The Rise and Fall of Ziggy Stardust and the Spiders from Mars
- OK Computer
- Ten
- Nevermind
- Regatta de Blanc
- Outlandos d'Amour
- The Joshua Tree
- London Calling
- Band on the Run
- Texas Flood
- Let It Bleed
- Sticky Fingers
- Some Girls
- Exile on Main St.
- Appetite for Destruction
- Highway to Hell
- Back in Black
- Born to Run
- Hotel California
- Eagles: Greatest Hits
- Rumours
- The Doors
- L.A. Woman
- Legend
- Pearl
- Paranoid
- Van Halen
- Thriller
- Purple Rain
- Nothing's Shocking
- Woodstock
- 2112
- Saturday Night Fever
- Elton John Greatest Hits
- Damn the Torpedoes
- Dreamboat Annie
- Aretha’s Gold
- Wildflowers
- Brothers in Arms
- A Decade of Hits
- Chronicle
- Synchronicity
- The Stranger
- Bat Out of Hell
- Graceland
