= Bill Robertson (director) =

Canadian screenwriter and film director

Bill Robertson is a Canadian film and television director, producer and screenwriter.

A 1988 graduate of York University's film studies program, he released the feature film The Events Leading Up to My Death in 1991. He won an Acura Award for Best Canadian Screenplay at the Vancouver International Film Festival. His second feature film, Apartment Hunting, was released in 2000.

His other credits include the short film A Christmas Haircut, and the television series True Crimes: The First 72 Hours, Museum Secrets and Ghostly Encounters.
