= Bria Salmena =

Canadian musician

Bria Salmena is a Canadian musician from Toronto. Salmena is formerly the lead singer of the band FRIGS.

== History ==
Salmena is the former vocalist for the indie rock band FRIGS, which has released two EPs and one full-length album. Salmena's first solo release was a set of Country music covers, released in September 2021, followed by a second set of covers in February 2023.

Salmena was also formerly a backing vocalist and musician for Orville Peck.

In 2024, Salmena released her first solo original song, titled "Bending Over Backwards". The following year, Salmena announced and released her debut solo studio album, titled Big Dog. The album received positive reviews.

== Discography ==
=== Solo studio albums ===
- Big Dog (2025, Royal Mountain Records)

=== Studio albums with FRIGS ===
- Basic Behavior (2018, Arts & Crafts Productions)
