= The Events Leading Up to My Death =

- Directed by: Bill Robertson
- Written by: Bill Robertson
- Produced by: Moira Holmes; Bill Robertson
- Starring: Rosemary Radcliffe; Peter MacNeill; John Allore; Linda Kash; Karen Hines
- Cinematography: Derick Underschultz
- Edited by: David Ostry; Bill Robertson
- Music by: Mary Margaret O'Hara
- Production company: Flat Rock Films
- Release date: September 8, 1991 (TIFF)
- Running time: 89 minutes
- Country: Canada
- Language: English

The Events Leading Up to My Death is a Canadian comedy film, released in 1991. Written and directed by Bill Robertson, the film revolves around the dysfunctional Snack family around the time of the death of Busty, the family's pet dog.

== Plot ==
The film stars John Allore as Angus, who is visiting for his 21st birthday after escaping the stifling family home in Don Mills to get his own apartment in downtown Toronto with his girlfriend Julia (Maria Del Mar).

His parents (Peter MacNeill and Rosemary Radcliffe) barely communicate, with his dad spending most of his time golfing and his mom spending all her time in the kitchen baking and cooking too much food and having an affair with the milkman (Frank McAnulty). Meanwhile his sister Lindsay (Linda Kash) spends all her time making strange dough art in the hopes of setting off a house fire so that she can be rescued by and fall in love with a hot fireman (Jeremy Ratchford), while his other sister Katy (Karen Hines) is constantly having casual sex with every man she meets.

When dad reveals that he has been taking secret dance lessons from Rita (Mary Margaret O'Hara), the family end up signing up for group dance classes in the hopes that the shared experience can heal their relationship.

O'Hara also composed much of the film's score.

== Distribution ==
The film premiered in September 1991 at the 1991 Toronto International Film Festival.

== Critical response ==
In his 2003 book A Century of Canadian Cinema, Gerald Pratley wrote that the film was "a worthy attempt at satirizing an affluent suburban family", but concluded that "they are a tiresome and uninteresting lot, the writing fails to sustain the premise, and the cast are not up to it."

== Awards ==
Robertson won the Acura Award for Best Canadian Screenplay at the Vancouver International Film Festival.
