= Canadian Screen Award for Best Supporting Actress in a Drama Program or Series =

Discontinued annual Canadian media award

The Canadian Screen Award for Best Supporting Actress in a Drama Series or Program is an annual Canadian television award, presented by the Academy of Canadian Cinema and Television to the best supporting performance by an actress in a Canadian dramatic television series or television film. Previously presented as part of the Gemini Awards, since 2013 it has been presented as part of the Canadian Screen Awards.

Originally, only a single award for supporting actress was presented, without regard to the distinction between series, miniseries or television films. At the 10th Gemini Awards in 1995, separate awards were instituted for supporting actress in a television series and supporting actress in a television film or miniseries; the separate awards were presented until the Gemini Awards were merged into the Canadian Screen Awards, and since the 1st Canadian Screen Awards in 2012 there has again only been a single category presented for all three types of content.

In August 2022, the Academy announced that beginning with the 11th Canadian Screen Awards in 2023, a gender-neutral award for Best Supporting Performance in a Drama Program or Series will be presented.

== 1980s ==
Year	Actress	Series	Ref
1986; 1st Gemini Awards
1986; 1st Gemini Awards	Colleen Dewhurst	Anne of Green Gables	
1986; 1st Gemini Awards	Anne Anglin	Turning to Stone	
1986; 1st Gemini Awards	Sharry Flett	The Suicide Murders	
1986; 1st Gemini Awards	Jackie Richardson	Turning to Stone	
1987; 2nd Gemini Awards
1987; 2nd Gemini Awards	Vivian Reis	The Marriage Bed	
1987; 2nd Gemini Awards	Deborah Cass	The Last Season	
1987; 2nd Gemini Awards	Linda Griffiths	Sword of Gideon	
1987; 2nd Gemini Awards	Heather Thomas	Ford: The Man and the Machine	
1988; 3rd Gemini Awards
1988; 3rd Gemini Awards	Colleen Dewhurst	Anne of Avonlea	
1988; 3rd Gemini Awards	Rosemary Dunsmore	Blades of Courage	
1988; 3rd Gemini Awards	Wendy Hiller	Anne of Avonlea	
1988; 3rd Gemini Awards	Helen Hughes	The Kidnapping of Baby John Doe	
1988; 3rd Gemini Awards	Sophie Léger	Chasing Rainbows	
1989; 4th Gemini Awards
1989; 4th Gemini Awards	Martha Gibson	Two Men	
1989; 4th Gemini Awards	Marie-Christine Barrault	No Blame	
1989; 4th Gemini Awards	Patricia Collins	Two Men	
1989; 4th Gemini Awards	Nicky Guadagni	The Squamish Five	
1989; 4th Gemini Awards	Robyn Stevan	9B	

== 1990s ==
Year	Actress	Film	Ref
1990; 5th Gemini Awards
1990; 5th Gemini Awards	Ann-Marie MacDonald	Where the Spirit Lives	
1990; 5th Gemini Awards	Lally Cadeau	Road to Avonlea	
1990; 5th Gemini Awards	Ocean Hellman	Anything to Survive	
1990; 5th Gemini Awards	Sherry Miller	E.N.G.	
1990; 5th Gemini Awards	Mary Beth Rubens	E.N.G.	
1991; 6th Gemini Awards
1991; 6th Gemini Awards	Sarah Polley	Lantern Hill	
1991; 6th Gemini Awards	Lally Cadeau	Road to Avonlea	
1991; 6th Gemini Awards	Marion Gilsenan	Getting Married in Buffalo Jump	
1991; 6th Gemini Awards	Sherry Miller	E.N.G.	
1991; 6th Gemini Awards	Leah Pinsent	The Little Kidnappers	
1991; 6th Gemini Awards	Gema Zamprogna	Road to Avonlea	
1992; 7th Gemini Awards
1992; 7th Gemini Awards	Brooke Johnson	Conspiracy of Silence	
1992; 7th Gemini Awards	Lally Cadeau	Road to Avonlea	
1992; 7th Gemini Awards	Catherine Disher	Grand Larceny	
1992; 7th Gemini Awards	Patricia Hamilton	Road to Avonlea	
1992; 7th Gemini Awards	Theresa Tova	E.N.G.	
1993; 8th Gemini Awards
1993; 8th Gemini Awards	Lise Roy	The Boys of St. Vincent	
1993; 8th Gemini Awards	Julie Khaner	Street Legal	
1993; 8th Gemini Awards	Peggy McCay	Woman on the Run: The Lawrencia Bembenek Story	
1993; 8th Gemini Awards	Jackie Richardson	Catwalk	
1993; 8th Gemini Awards	Ashley Rogers	Family of Strangers	
1993; 8th Gemini Awards	Susan Wright	I'll Never Get to Heaven	
1994; 9th Gemini Awards
1994; 9th Gemini Awards	Jennifer Phipps	Coming of Age	
1994; 9th Gemini Awards	Cynthia Belliveau	E.N.G.	
1994; 9th Gemini Awards	Tina Louise Bomberry	North of 60	
1994; 9th Gemini Awards	Larissa Laskin	Dieppe	
1994; 9th Gemini Awards	Gema Zamprogna	Road to Avonlea	
1995; 10th Gemini Awards
1995; 10th Gemini Awards	Dramatic Series		
1995; 10th Gemini Awards	Patricia Hamilton	Road to Avonlea	
1995; 10th Gemini Awards	Marilyn Lightstone	Road to Avonlea	
1995; 10th Gemini Awards	Janne Mortil	Side Effects	
1995; 10th Gemini Awards	Mag Ruffman	Road to Avonlea	
1995; 10th Gemini Awards	Cheryl Wilson	Destiny Ridge	
1995; 10th Gemini Awards	Television Film or Miniseries		
1995; 10th Gemini Awards	Catherine Fitch	Butterbox Babies	
1995; 10th Gemini Awards	Deborah Duchêne	Forever Knight: "Curioser & Curioser"	
1995; 10th Gemini Awards	Frances Hyland	Broken Lullaby	
1995; 10th Gemini Awards	Charmion King	Broken Lullaby	
1995; 10th Gemini Awards	Kate Nelligan	Million Dollar Babies	
1996; 11th Gemini Awards
1996; 11th Gemini Awards	Dramatic Series		
1996; 11th Gemini Awards	Kay Tremblay	Road to Avonlea	
1996; 11th Gemini Awards	Janet Bailey	Traders	
1996; 11th Gemini Awards	Patricia Hamilton	Road to Avonlea	
1996; 11th Gemini Awards	Terri Hawkes	Traders	
1996; 11th Gemini Awards	Ramona Milano	Due South	
1996; 11th Gemini Awards	Television Film or Miniseries		
1996; 11th Gemini Awards	Teresa Stratas	Under the Piano	
1996; 11th Gemini Awards	Angela Featherstone	Family of Cops	
1996; 11th Gemini Awards	Sabrina Grdevich	Little Criminals	
1996; 11th Gemini Awards	Mimi Kuzyk	Little Criminals	
1996; 11th Gemini Awards	Mary Walsh	The Elf	
1997; 12th Gemini Awards
1997; 12th Gemini Awards	Dramatic Series		
1997; 12th Gemini Awards	Robin Craig	Wind at My Back	
1997; 12th Gemini Awards	Janet Bailey	Traders	
1997; 12th Gemini Awards	Stacy Grant	Madison	
1997; 12th Gemini Awards	Sabrina Grdevich	Traders	
1997; 12th Gemini Awards	Kim Huffman	Traders	
1997; 12th Gemini Awards	Television Film or Miniseries		
1997; 12th Gemini Awards	Jayne Eastwood	Dangerous Offender: The Marlene Moore Story	
1997; 12th Gemini Awards	Patricia Gage	Dangerous Offender: The Marlene Moore Story	
1997; 12th Gemini Awards	Brooke Johnson	For Those Who Hunt the Wounded Down	
1997; 12th Gemini Awards	Elena Kudaba	Peacekeepers	
1997; 12th Gemini Awards	Barbara Williams	Breach of Faith: A Family of Cops 2	
1998; 13th Gemini Awards
1998; 13th Gemini Awards	Dramatic Series		
1998; 13th Gemini Awards	Kim Huffman	Traders	
1998; 13th Gemini Awards	Mary-Colin Chisholm	Black Harbour	
1998; 13th Gemini Awards	Patricia Collins	The Rez	
1998; 13th Gemini Awards	Jessica Pellerin	Emily of New Moon	
1998; 13th Gemini Awards	Alberta Watson	Nikita	
1998; 13th Gemini Awards	Television Film or Miniseries		
1998; 13th Gemini Awards	Nicky Guadagni	Major Crime	
1998; 13th Gemini Awards	Macha Grenon	The Sleep Room	
1998; 13th Gemini Awards	Sarah Polley	The Planet of Junior Brown	
1998; 13th Gemini Awards	Lynn Redgrave	White Lies	
1998; 13th Gemini Awards	Gabrielle Rose	The Sleep Room	
1999; 14th Gemini Awards
1999; 14th Gemini Awards	Dramatic Series		
1999; 14th Gemini Awards	Marion Gilsenan	Riverdale	
1999; 14th Gemini Awards	Jackie Burroughs	More Tales of the City	
1999; 14th Gemini Awards	Ramona Milano	Due South	
1999; 14th Gemini Awards	Caterina Scorsone	Power Play	
1999; 14th Gemini Awards	Sarah Strange	Foolish Heart	
1999; 14th Gemini Awards	Television Film or Miniseries		
1999; 14th Gemini Awards	Sabrina Grdevich	Milgaard	
1999; 14th Gemini Awards	Shannon Lawson	Sleeping Dogs Lie	
1999; 14th Gemini Awards	Deanna Milligan	Justice	
1999; 14th Gemini Awards	Mag Ruffman	Happy Christmas, Miss King	
1999; 14th Gemini Awards	Leah Pinsent	Win, Again!	

== 2000s ==
Year	Actress	Series	Ref
2000; 15th Gemini Awards
2000; 15th Gemini Awards	Dramatic Series		
2000; 15th Gemini Awards	Shannon Lawson	The City	
2000; 15th Gemini Awards	Jackie Burroughs	Cover Me	
2000; 15th Gemini Awards	Rachael Crawford	Traders	
2000; 15th Gemini Awards	Anita La Selva	Earth: Final Conflict	
2000; 15th Gemini Awards	Angela Vint	Traders	
2000; 15th Gemini Awards	Television Film or Miniseries		
2000; 15th Gemini Awards	Shirley Douglas	Shadow Lake	
2000; 15th Gemini Awards	Marie-Josée Croze	Murder Most Likely	
2000; 15th Gemini Awards	Janine Theriault	Murder Most Likely	
2001; 16th Gemini Awards
2001; 16th Gemini Awards	Dramatic Series		
2001; 16th Gemini Awards	Tamara Craig Thomas	Cold Squad	
2001; 16th Gemini Awards	Mimi Kuzyk	Blue Murder	
2001; 16th Gemini Awards	Marnie McPhail	The Associates	
2001; 16th Gemini Awards	Colleen Rennison	These Arms of Mine	
2001; 16th Gemini Awards	Lisa Ryder	Andromeda	
2001; 16th Gemini Awards	Television Film or Miniseries		
2001; 16th Gemini Awards	Sherry Miller	Lucky Girl	
2001; 16th Gemini Awards	Jennifer Dale	Revenge of the Land	
2001; 16th Gemini Awards	Kari Matchett	A Colder Kind of Death	
2001; 16th Gemini Awards	Lise Roy	Children of My Heart	
2001; 16th Gemini Awards	Janet Wright	Chasing Cain	
2002; 17th Gemini Awards
2002; 17th Gemini Awards	Dramatic Series		
2002; 17th Gemini Awards	Dixie Seatle	Paradise Falls	
2002; 17th Gemini Awards	Rebecca Jenkins	The Associates	
2002; 17th Gemini Awards	Marnie McPhail	The Associates	
2002; 17th Gemini Awards	Lauren Lee Smith	Mutant X	
2002; 17th Gemini Awards	Tamara Craig Thomas	Cold Squad	
2002; 17th Gemini Awards	Television Film or Miniseries		
2002; 17th Gemini Awards	Jackie Burroughs	Further Tales of the City	
2002; 17th Gemini Awards	Céline Bonnier	The Last Chapter	
2002; 17th Gemini Awards	Brenda Fricker	Torso: The Evelyn Dick Story	
2002; 17th Gemini Awards	Sherry Miller	A Killing Spring	
2002; 17th Gemini Awards	Deborah Pollitt	Random Passage	
2003; 18th Gemini Awards
2003; 18th Gemini Awards	Dramatic Series		
2003; 18th Gemini Awards	Jennie Raymond	Blue Murder	
2003; 18th Gemini Awards	Paula Boudreau	Doc	
2003; 18th Gemini Awards	Stacy Grant	Cold Squad	
2003; 18th Gemini Awards	Ruth Marshall	Doc	
2003; 18th Gemini Awards	Andrea C. Robinson	Doc	
2003; 18th Gemini Awards	Television Film or Miniseries		
2003; 18th Gemini Awards	Janet Wright	Betrayed	
2003; 18th Gemini Awards	Larissa Laskin	Scar Tissue	
2003; 18th Gemini Awards	Michelle Nolden	Hemingway vs. Callaghan	
2003; 18th Gemini Awards	Reagan Pasternak	Hemingway vs. Callaghan	
2004; 19th Gemini Awards
2004; 19th Gemini Awards	Dramatic Series		
2004; 19th Gemini Awards	Rachel McAdams	Slings & Arrows	
2004; 19th Gemini Awards	Jennifer Irwin	Slings & Arrows	
2004; 19th Gemini Awards	Andrea C. Robinson	Doc	
2004; 19th Gemini Awards	Television Film or Miniseries		
2004; 19th Gemini Awards	Nthati Motesh	Human Cargo	
2004; 19th Gemini Awards	Myriam Acharki	Human Cargo	
2004; 19th Gemini Awards	Cara Pifko	Human Cargo	
2005; 20th Gemini Awards
2005; 20th Gemini Awards	Dramatic Series		
2005; 20th Gemini Awards	Elliot Page	ReGenesis	
2005; 20th Gemini Awards	Sonja Bennett	Cold Squad	
2005; 20th Gemini Awards	Ellen Dubin	The Collector	
2005; 20th Gemini Awards	Catherine Fitch	This Is Wonderland	
2005; 20th Gemini Awards	Kate Trotter	Paradise Falls	
2005; 20th Gemini Awards	Television Film or Miniseries		
2005; 20th Gemini Awards	Maria Popistașu	Sex Traffic	
2005; 20th Gemini Awards	Layla Alizada	Chasing Freedom	
2005; 20th Gemini Awards	Miranda Handford	Tripping the Wire: A Stephen Tree Mystery	
2005; 20th Gemini Awards	Martha Henry	H_{2}O	
2005; 20th Gemini Awards	Alberta Watson	Choice: The Henry Morgentaler Story	
2006; 21st Gemini Awards
2006; 21st Gemini Awards	Dramatic Series		
2006; 21st Gemini Awards	Susan Coyne	Slings & Arrows	
2006; 21st Gemini Awards	Jayne Eastwood	This Is Wonderland	
2006; 21st Gemini Awards	Patricia McKenzie	Charlie Jade	
2006; 21st Gemini Awards	Sarah Strange	ReGenesis	
2006; 21st Gemini Awards	Kathryn Winslow	This Is Wonderland	
2006; 21st Gemini Awards	Television Film or Miniseries		
2006; 21st Gemini Awards	Lushin Dubey	Murder Unveiled	
2006; 21st Gemini Awards	Isabelle Blais	Human Trafficking	
2006; 21st Gemini Awards	Megan Follows	Shania: A Life in Eight Albums	
2006; 21st Gemini Awards	Hélène Joy	Under the Dragon's Tail	
2007; 22nd Gemini Awards
2007; 22nd Gemini Awards	Dramatic Series		
2007; 22nd Gemini Awards	Wendy Crewson	ReGenesis	
2007; 22nd Gemini Awards	Lynda Boyd	Falcon Beach	
2007; 22nd Gemini Awards	Jeananne Goossen	Falcon Beach	
2007; 22nd Gemini Awards	Mayko Nguyen	ReGenesis	
2007; 22nd Gemini Awards	Sarah Polley	Slings & Arrows	
2007; 22nd Gemini Awards	Television Film or Miniseries		
2007; 22nd Gemini Awards	Yanna McIntosh	Doomstown	
2007; 22nd Gemini Awards	Wendy Crewson	The Robber Bride	
2007; 22nd Gemini Awards	Megan Follows	Booky Makes Her Mark	
2007; 22nd Gemini Awards	Tegan Moss	Eight Days to Live	
2007; 22nd Gemini Awards	Jean Yoon	Dragon Boys	
2008; 23rd Gemini Awards
2008; 23rd Gemini Awards	Dramatic Series		
2008; 23rd Gemini Awards	Maria Doyle Kennedy	The Tudors	
2008; 23rd Gemini Awards	Wendy Crewson	ReGenesis	
2008; 23rd Gemini Awards	Catherine Disher	The Border	
2008; 23rd Gemini Awards	Laurence Leboeuf	Durham County	
2008; 23rd Gemini Awards	Sonya Salomaa	Durham County	
2008; 23rd Gemini Awards	Television Film or Miniseries		
2008; 23rd Gemini Awards	Katharine Isabelle	The Englishman's Boy	
2008; 23rd Gemini Awards	Nahanni Johnstone	Booky and the Secret Santa	
2008; 23rd Gemini Awards	Andrea Martin	St. Urbain's Horseman	
2008; 23rd Gemini Awards	Cara Pifko	I Me Wed	
2008; 23rd Gemini Awards	Clare Stone	Would Be Kings	
2009; 24th Gemini Awards
2009; 24th Gemini Awards	Dramatic Series		
2009; 24th Gemini Awards	Gabrielle Miller	Robson Arms	
2009; 24th Gemini Awards	Lolita Davidovich	ZOS: Zone of Separation	
2009; 24th Gemini Awards	Catherine Disher	The Border	
2009; 24th Gemini Awards	Tasha Lawrence	The Line	
2009; 24th Gemini Awards	Reagan Pasternak	Being Erica	
2009; 24th Gemini Awards	Television Film or Miniseries		
2009; 24th Gemini Awards	Barbara Hershey	Anne of Green Gables: A New Beginning	
2009; 24th Gemini Awards	Kaniehtiio Horn	Moccasin Flats: Redemption	
2009; 24th Gemini Awards	Louise Rose	Diamonds	

== 2010s ==
Year	Actress	Series	Ref
2010; 25th Gemini Awards
2010; 25th Gemini Awards	Dramatic Series		
2010; 25th Gemini Awards	Catherine Disher	The Border	
2010; 25th Gemini Awards	Eve Harlow	The Guard	
2010; 25th Gemini Awards	Reagan Pasternak	Being Erica	
2010; 25th Gemini Awards	Jessica Steen	Flashpoint	
2010; 25th Gemini Awards	Rachel Wilson	Republic of Doyle	
2010; 25th Gemini Awards	Television Film or Miniseries		
2010; 25th Gemini Awards	Debra Lynne McCabe	Guns	
2010; 25th Gemini Awards	Wendy Crewson	The Summit	
2010; 25th Gemini Awards	Sarah Manninen	Keep Your Head Up, Kid: The Don Cherry Story	
2011; 26th Gemini Awards
2011; 26th Gemini Awards	Dramatic Series		
2011; 26th Gemini Awards	Ksenia Solo	Lost Girl	
2011; 26th Gemini Awards	Bénédicte Décary	Durham County	
2011; 26th Gemini Awards	Katharine Isabelle	Endgame	
2011; 26th Gemini Awards	Melanie Nicholls-King	Rookie Blue	
2011; 26th Gemini Awards	Enuka Okuma	Rookie Blue	
2011; 26th Gemini Awards	Television Film or Miniseries		
2011; 26th Gemini Awards	Diana Hardcastle	The Kennedys	
2011; 26th Gemini Awards	Alison Pill	The Pillars of the Earth	
2011; 26th Gemini Awards	Karen Robinson	The Gospel According to the Blues	
2012; 1st Canadian Screen Awards
2012; 1st Canadian Screen Awards	Wendy Crewson	Saving Hope	
2012; 1st Canadian Screen Awards	Georgina Lightning	Blackstone	
2012; 1st Canadian Screen Awards	Enuka Okuma	Rookie Blue	
2012; 1st Canadian Screen Awards	Kelly Rowan	Cyberbully	
2012; 1st Canadian Screen Awards	Ksenia Solo	Lost Girl	
2013; 2nd Canadian Screen Awards
2013; 2nd Canadian Screen Awards	Maria Doyle Kennedy	Orphan Black	
2013; 2nd Canadian Screen Awards	Claudia Black	Haven	
2013; 2nd Canadian Screen Awards	Priscilla Faia	Rookie Blue	
2013; 2nd Canadian Screen Awards	Cheri Maracle	Blackstone	
2013; 2nd Canadian Screen Awards	Luvia Petersen	Continuum	
2014; 3rd Canadian Screen Awards
2014; 3rd Canadian Screen Awards	Ali Liebert	Bomb Girls	
2014; 3rd Canadian Screen Awards	Jane Alexander	Forgive Me	
2014; 3rd Canadian Screen Awards	Olympia Dukakis	Sex & Violence	
2014; 3rd Canadian Screen Awards	Laurence Leboeuf	19-2	
2014; 3rd Canadian Screen Awards	Maxim Roy	19-2	
2015; 4th Canadian Screen Awards
2015; 4th Canadian Screen Awards	Shailyn Pierre-Dixon	The Book of Negroes	
2015; 4th Canadian Screen Awards	Martha Burns	Remedy	
2015; 4th Canadian Screen Awards	Maria Doyle Kennedy	Orphan Black	
2015; 4th Canadian Screen Awards	Laurence Leboeuf	19-2	
2015; 4th Canadian Screen Awards	Julia Taylor Ross	Saving Hope	
2016; 5th Canadian Screen Awards
2016; 5th Canadian Screen Awards	Wendy Crewson	Slasher	
2016; 5th Canadian Screen Awards	Lara Jean Chorostecki	X Company	
2016; 5th Canadian Screen Awards	Michelle Nolden	Saving Hope	
2016; 5th Canadian Screen Awards	Shailyn Pierre-Dixon	Between	
2016; 5th Canadian Screen Awards	Lauren Lee Smith	This Life	
2017; 6th Canadian Screen Awards
2017; 6th Canadian Screen Awards	Allie MacDonald	Cardinal	
2017; 6th Canadian Screen Awards	Katy Breier	FANatic	
2017; 6th Canadian Screen Awards	Suzanne Clément	Versailles	
2017; 6th Canadian Screen Awards	Geraldine James	Anne with an E	
2017; 6th Canadian Screen Awards	Madeleine Knight	X Company	
2018; 7th Canadian Screen Awards
2018; 7th Canadian Screen Awards	Geraldine James	Anne with an E	
2018; 7th Canadian Screen Awards	Selena Lee	Blood and Water	
2018; 7th Canadian Screen Awards	Sharron Matthews	Frankie Drake Mysteries	
2018; 7th Canadian Screen Awards	Chanelle Peloso	The Bletchley Circle: San Francisco	
2018; 7th Canadian Screen Awards	Mackenzie Porter	Travelers	
2019; 8th Canadian Screen Awards
2019; 8th Canadian Screen Awards	Kristen Thomson	Cardinal	
2019; 8th Canadian Screen Awards	Rosemary Dunsmore	Street Legal	
2019; 8th Canadian Screen Awards	Kelly McCormack	Killjoys	
2019; 8th Canadian Screen Awards	Karen Robinson	Forgive Me	
2019; 8th Canadian Screen Awards	Elizabeth Saunders	Mary Kills People	

== 2020s ==
Year	Actress	Series	Ref
2020; 9th Canadian Screen Awards
2020; 9th Canadian Screen Awards	Tamara Podemski	Coroner	
2020; 9th Canadian Screen Awards	Anna Lambe	Trickster	
2020; 9th Canadian Screen Awards	Georgina Lightning	Trickster	
2020; 9th Canadian Screen Awards	Sharron Matthews	Frankie Drake Mysteries	
2020; 9th Canadian Screen Awards	Gail Maurice	Trickster	
2021; 10th Canadian Screen Awards
2021; 10th Canadian Screen Awards	Ayisha Issa	Transplant	
2021; 10th Canadian Screen Awards	Natasha Henstridge	Diggstown	
2021; 10th Canadian Screen Awards	Emma Hunter	Moonshine	
2021; 10th Canadian Screen Awards	Rebecca Liddiard	Frankie Drake Mysteries	
2021; 10th Canadian Screen Awards	Tamara Podemski	Unsettled	
