= Canadian Screen Award for Best Actress in a Comedy Series =

Discontinued annual Canadian media award

The Canadian Screen Award for Best Actress in Comedy Series is an annual Canadian television award, presented by the Academy of Canadian Cinema and Television to the best leading performance by an actress in a Canadian television comedy series.

The award was first presented in 1986 as part of the Gemini Awards. However, as Canadian television comedy was dominated by sketch comedy rather than narrative sitcoms in the late 1980s, the awards for Best Actress and Best Actor in a Comedy Series were discontinued after 1987, with only a single gender-neutral award presented for Best Performance in a Comedy thereafter; separate awards for Individual Performance in a Comedy and Ensemble Performance in a Comedy were introduced for the 16th Gemini Awards in 2001, but were still not separated for gender.

With the revival of scripted narrative comedy series in the 2000s, separate awards for actors and actresses were reinstated in 2011, and have been presented since then as part of the Canadian Screen Awards.

In August 2022, the Academy announced that beginning with the 11th Canadian Screen Awards in 2023, a gender-neutral award for Best Leading Performance in a Comedy Series will be presented.

== 1980s ==
Year	Actor	Series	Ref
1986; 1st Gemini Awards
1986; 1st Gemini Awards	Martha Gibson	Seeing Things	
1986; 1st Gemini Awards	Lally Cadeau	Hangin' In	
1986; 1st Gemini Awards	Janet-Laine Green	Seeing Things	
1987; 2nd Gemini Awards
1987; 2nd Gemini Awards	Dinah Christie	Check it Out!	
1987; 2nd Gemini Awards	Lally Cadeau	Hangin' In	
1987; 2nd Gemini Awards	Martha Gibson	Seeing Things	
1987; 2nd Gemini Awards	Janet-Laine Green	Seeing Things	

== 2010s ==
Year	Actor	Series	Ref
2011; 26th Gemini Awards
2011; 26th Gemini Awards	Tracy Dawson	Call Me Fitz	
2011; 26th Gemini Awards	Angela Asher	18 to Life	
2011; 26th Gemini Awards	Grace Lynn Kung	InSecurity	
2011; 26th Gemini Awards	Brooke Nevin	Call Me Fitz	
2012; 1st Canadian Screen Awards
2012; 1st Canadian Screen Awards	Wendel Meldrum	Less Than Kind	
2012; 1st Canadian Screen Awards	Jennifer Irwin	Mr. D	
2012; 1st Canadian Screen Awards	Cathy Jones	This Hour Has 22 Minutes	
2012; 1st Canadian Screen Awards	Natalie Lisinska	InSecurity	
2012; 1st Canadian Screen Awards	Tommie-Amber Pirie	Michael: Tuesdays and Thursdays	
2013; 2nd Canadian Screen Awards
2013; 2nd Canadian Screen Awards	Tracy Dawson	Call Me Fitz	
2013; 2nd Canadian Screen Awards	Wendel Meldrum	Less Than Kind	
2013; 2nd Canadian Screen Awards	Carrie-Lynn Neales	Seed	
2013; 2nd Canadian Screen Awards	Nancy Sorel	Less Than Kind	
2014; 3rd Canadian Screen Awards
2014; 3rd Canadian Screen Awards	Joanna Cassidy	Call Me Fitz	
2014; 3rd Canadian Screen Awards	Andrea Martin	Working the Engels	
2014; 3rd Canadian Screen Awards	Carrie-Lynn Neales	Seed	
2014; 3rd Canadian Screen Awards	Kacey Rohl	Working the Engels	
2014; 3rd Canadian Screen Awards	Julia Voth	Package Deal	
2015; 4th Canadian Screen Awards
2015; 4th Canadian Screen Awards	Catherine O'Hara	Schitt's Creek	
2015; 4th Canadian Screen Awards	Brittany LeBorgne	Mohawk Girls	
2015; 4th Canadian Screen Awards	Annie Murphy	Schitt's Creek	
2015; 4th Canadian Screen Awards	Belinda Cornish	Tiny Plastic Men	
2016; 5th Canadian Screen Awards
2016; 5th Canadian Screen Awards	Catherine O'Hara	Schitt's Creek	
2016; 5th Canadian Screen Awards	Andrea Bang	Kim's Convenience	
2016; 5th Canadian Screen Awards	Kim Cattrall	Sensitive Skin	
2016; 5th Canadian Screen Awards	Jennifer Dale	What Would Sal Do?	
2016; 5th Canadian Screen Awards	Jean Yoon	Kim's Convenience	
2017; 6th Canadian Screen Awards
2017; 6th Canadian Screen Awards	Catherine O'Hara	Schitt's Creek	
2017; 6th Canadian Screen Awards	Andrea Bang	Kim's Convenience	
2017; 6th Canadian Screen Awards	Annie Murphy	Schitt's Creek	
2017; 6th Canadian Screen Awards	Catherine Reitman	Workin' Moms	
2017; 6th Canadian Screen Awards	Jean Yoon	Kim's Convenience	
2018; 7th Canadian Screen Awards
2018; 7th Canadian Screen Awards	Catherine O'Hara	Schitt's Creek	
2018; 7th Canadian Screen Awards	Dani Kind	Workin' Moms	
2018; 7th Canadian Screen Awards	Annie Murphy	Schitt's Creek	
2018; 7th Canadian Screen Awards	Catherine Reitman	Workin' Moms	
2018; 7th Canadian Screen Awards	Cindy Sampson	Private Eyes	
2019; 8th Canadian Screen Awards
2019; 8th Canadian Screen Awards	Catherine O'Hara	Schitt's Creek	
2019; 8th Canadian Screen Awards	Jann Arden	Jann	
2019; 8th Canadian Screen Awards	Annie Murphy	Schitt's Creek	
2019; 8th Canadian Screen Awards	Michelle Mylett	Letterkenny	
2019; 8th Canadian Screen Awards	Jean Yoon	Kim's Convenience	

== 2020s ==
Year	Actor	Series	Ref
2020; 9th Canadian Screen Awards
2020; 9th Canadian Screen Awards	Catherine O'Hara	Schitt's Creek	
2020; 9th Canadian Screen Awards	Dani Kind	Workin' Moms	
2020; 9th Canadian Screen Awards	Annie Murphy	Schitt's Creek	
2020; 9th Canadian Screen Awards	Catherine Reitman	Workin' Moms	
2020; 9th Canadian Screen Awards	Jean Yoon	Kim's Convenience	
2021; 10th Canadian Screen Awards
2021; 10th Canadian Screen Awards	Jean Yoon	Kim's Convenience	
2021; 10th Canadian Screen Awards	Jann Arden	Jann	
2021; 10th Canadian Screen Awards	Andrea Bang	Kim's Convenience	
2021; 10th Canadian Screen Awards	Dani Kind	Workin' Moms	
2021; 10th Canadian Screen Awards	Meredith MacNeill	Pretty Hard Cases	
