= Canadian Screen Award for Best Actor in a Comedy Series =

Retired annual Canadian media award

The Canadian Screen Award for Best Actor in Comedy Series is an annual Canadian television award, presented by the Academy of Canadian Cinema and Television to the best leading performance by an actor in a Canadian television comedy series.

The award was first presented in 1986 as part of the Gemini Awards. However, as Canadian television comedy was dominated by sketch comedy rather than narrative sitcoms in the late 1980s, the awards for Best Actor and Best Actress in a Comedy Series were discontinued after 1987, with only a single gender-neutral award presented for Best Performance in a Comedy thereafter; separate awards for Individual Performance in a Comedy and Ensemble Performance in a Comedy were introduced for the 16th Gemini Awards in 2001, but were still not separated for gender.

With the revival of scripted narrative comedy series in the 2000s, separate awards for actors and actresses were reinstated in 2011, and have been presented since then as part of the Canadian Screen Awards.

In August 2022, the Academy announced that beginning with the 11th Canadian Screen Awards in 2023, a gender-neutral award for Best Leading Performance in a Comedy Series will be presented.

== 1980s ==
Year	Actor	Series	Ref
1986; 1st Gemini Awards
1986; 1st Gemini Awards	Louis Del Grande	Seeing Things	
1986; 1st Gemini Awards	Don Adams	Check it Out!	
1986; 1st Gemini Awards	David Eisner	Hangin' In	
1987; 2nd Gemini Awards
1987; 2nd Gemini Awards	Louis Del Grande	Seeing Things	
1987; 2nd Gemini Awards	David Eisner	Hangin' In	

== 2010s ==
Year	Actor	Series	Ref
2011; 26th Gemini Awards
2011; 26th Gemini Awards	Peter Keleghan	18 to Life	
2011; 26th Gemini Awards	Chris Leavins	Todd and the Book of Pure Evil	
2011; 26th Gemini Awards	Jason Priestley	Call Me Fitz	
2011; 26th Gemini Awards	John Ralston	Living in Your Car	
2012; 1st Canadian Screen Awards
2012; 1st Canadian Screen Awards	Gerry Dee	Mr. D	
2012; 1st Canadian Screen Awards	Ryan Belleville	Almost Heroes	
2012; 1st Canadian Screen Awards	Shaun Majumder	This Hour Has 22 Minutes	
2012; 1st Canadian Screen Awards	Bob Martin	Michael: Tuesdays and Thursdays	
2012; 1st Canadian Screen Awards	Martin Short	I, Martin Short, Goes Home	
2013; 2nd Canadian Screen Awards
2013; 2nd Canadian Screen Awards	Jason Priestley	Call Me Fitz	
2013; 2nd Canadian Screen Awards	Jesse Camacho	Less Than Kind	
2013; 2nd Canadian Screen Awards	Gavin Crawford	Gavin Crawford's Wild West	
2013; 2nd Canadian Screen Awards	Gerry Dee	Mr. D	
2013; 2nd Canadian Screen Awards	Ron James	The Ron James Show	
2014; 3rd Canadian Screen Awards
2014; 3rd Canadian Screen Awards	Don McKellar	Sensitive Skin	
2014; 3rd Canadian Screen Awards	Gerry Dee	Mr. D	
2014; 3rd Canadian Screen Awards	Dave Foley	Spun Out	
2014; 3rd Canadian Screen Awards	Adam Korson	Seed	
2014; 3rd Canadian Screen Awards	Mark Meer	Tiny Plastic Men	
2015; 4th Canadian Screen Awards
2015; 4th Canadian Screen Awards	Eugene Levy	Schitt's Creek	
2015; 4th Canadian Screen Awards	Gerry Dee	Mr. D	
2015; 4th Canadian Screen Awards	Dan Levy	Schitt's Creek	
2015; 4th Canadian Screen Awards	Dave Foley	Spun Out	
2016; 5th Canadian Screen Awards
2016; 5th Canadian Screen Awards	Paul Sun-Hyung Lee	Kim's Convenience	
2016; 5th Canadian Screen Awards	Gerry Dee	Mr. D	
2016; 5th Canadian Screen Awards	Jared Keeso	Letterkenny	
2016; 5th Canadian Screen Awards	Dan Levy	Schitt's Creek	
2016; 5th Canadian Screen Awards	Eugene Levy	Schitt's Creek	
2017; 6th Canadian Screen Awards
2017; 6th Canadian Screen Awards	Paul Sun-Hyung Lee	Kim's Convenience	
2017; 6th Canadian Screen Awards	Gerry Dee	Mr. D	
2017; 6th Canadian Screen Awards	Jared Keeso	Letterkenny	
2017; 6th Canadian Screen Awards	Dan Levy	Schitt's Creek	
2017; 6th Canadian Screen Awards	Eugene Levy	Schitt's Creek	
2018; 7th Canadian Screen Awards
2018; 7th Canadian Screen Awards	Jared Keeso	Letterkenny	
2018; 7th Canadian Screen Awards	Gerry Dee	Mr. D	
2018; 7th Canadian Screen Awards	Dan Levy	Schitt's Creek	
2018; 7th Canadian Screen Awards	Eugene Levy	Schitt's Creek	
2018; 7th Canadian Screen Awards	Jason Priestley	Private Eyes	
2019; 8th Canadian Screen Awards
2019; 8th Canadian Screen Awards	Eugene Levy	Schitt's Creek	
2019; 8th Canadian Screen Awards	Jared Keeso	Letterkenny	
2019; 8th Canadian Screen Awards	Paul Sun-Hyung Lee	Kim's Convenience	
2019; 8th Canadian Screen Awards	Dan Levy	Schitt's Creek	
2019; 8th Canadian Screen Awards	Jason Priestley	Private Eyes	

== 2020s ==
Year	Actor	Series	Ref
2020; 9th Canadian Screen Awards
2020; 9th Canadian Screen Awards	Paul Sun-Hyung Lee	Kim's Convenience	
2020; 9th Canadian Screen Awards	Jared Keeso	Letterkenny	
2020; 9th Canadian Screen Awards	Dan Levy	Schitt's Creek	
2020; 9th Canadian Screen Awards	Eugene Levy	Schitt's Creek	
2021; 10th Canadian Screen Awards
2021; 10th Canadian Screen Awards	Paul Sun-Hyung Lee	Kim's Convenience	
2021; 10th Canadian Screen Awards	Darryl Hinds	Overlord and the Underwoods	
2021; 10th Canadian Screen Awards	Jared Keeso	Letterkenny	
2021; 10th Canadian Screen Awards	Simu Liu	Kim's Convenience	
2021; 10th Canadian Screen Awards	Jason Priestley	Private Eyes	
