= Patricia Collins (actress) =

British actress (born 1937)

- Born: 1937 (age 88–89); Newcastle-upon-Tyne, England
- Occupation: Actress
- Years active: 1963–2015
- Spouse: Bob Mitchell

Patricia Collins (born 1937) is a British actress, who is prominently associated with the Stratford Festival.

== Life and career ==
Collins was born and raised in Newcastle-upon-Tyne, England. She worked as a copywriter for the Simpson catalogue after immigrating to Canada in the 1950s, selling knitwear at a department shop, and performing occasional stage work to make ends meet.

Beginning in 1963, she had various small parts in CBC Television's anthology series such as Playdate and Festival before being cast in her breakthrough role as Marty, the wife of John Vernon's title character, in the drama series Wojeck.

Her performances at Stratford included productions of King Lear (1985), A Comedy of Errors (1995), The Prime of Miss Jean Brodie (1998), The Night of the Iguana (1998), Pride and Prejudice (1999), Medea (2000), Tartuffe (2000), Present Laughter (2003), Gigi (2003), Anything Goes (2004), Guys and Dolls (2004), To Kill a Mockingbird (2007), Measure for Measure (2013), Mary Stuart (2013) and Christina, The Girl Queen (2014).

Her roles for other theatre companies have included Factory Theatre's production of George F. Walker's Beautiful City in 1987, Necessary Angel's production of Howard Barker's The Europeans in 1990, Tarragon Theatre's production of Judith Thompson's White Biting Dog in 1994, and Canadian Stage's production of Stephen Sondheim's A Little Night Music in 1995.

She appeared in the films Summer's Children, Bear Island, Nothing Personal, Phobia, Speaking Parts, Two Men, A Nest of Singing Birds, Where the Spirit Lives, The Adjuster and House, and in the television series McQueen, The Whiteoaks of Jalna, King of Kensington, The Edison Twins, Street Legal, North of 60, Ready or Not, The Rez, This Is Wonderland, Heartland, and Murdoch Mysteries.

She received a Genie Award nomination for Best Supporting Actress at the 1st Genie Awards in 1980 for Summer's Children.

In television, she was a Gemini Award nominee for Best Supporting Actress in a Drama Program or Series at the 4th Gemini Awards in 1989 for Two Men, and at the 13th Gemini Awards in 1998 for The Rez. She won Dora Mavor Moore Awards for Best Supporting Actress in 1990 for The Europeans, and Best Actress in 1994 for White Biting Dog.

== Personal life ==
She married Bob Mitchell, graphic designer, artist and former jazz drummer.
