= Grahame Woods =

Canadian cinematographer and writer (1934–2022)

Grahame Woods (January 31, 1934 – November 25, 2022) was a Canadian cinematographer and writer. He is most noted as a cinematographer for his work on the television drama series Wojeck, for which he won the Canadian Film Award for Best Black-and-White Cinematography at the 19th Canadian Film Awards in 1967 for the episode "The Last Man in the World"; as a writer, he is most noted for the television films War Brides (1980) and Glory Enough for All (1988).

Born in England, Woods moved to Canada in 1955, and joined the film production department of the Canadian Broadcasting Corporation. He worked as a cinematographer on a variety of CBC drama and documentary series through the 1950s and 1960s, including Wojeck, McQueen, Corwin, Telescope and This Hour Has Seven Days; on Wojeck he also had his first credit as a writer, on the episode "After All, Who's Art Morrison Anyway?". He subsequently wrote for the television series The Collaborators, The Whiteoaks of Jalna, Search and Rescue, 9B and Road to Avonlea, as well as writing War Brides and Glory Enough for All.

His 1977 novel Bloody Harvest was the second prize winner at the Periodical Distributors of Canada's Authors' Awards in 1979, and was reissued by McClelland and Stewart's New Canadian Library series in 1982.

He won ACTRA Awards for Best Writing in a TV Drama in 1973 for Vicky and in 1981 for War Brides, and a Gemini Award for Best Writing in a Drama Program or Miniseries at the 4th Gemini Awards in 1989 for Glory Enough for All. He was also the recipient of the Academy's Margaret Collier Award, its lifetime achievement award for television writing, at the 2nd Gemini Awards in 1987.
