= Michael McManus (Canadian actor) =

Canadian actor (born 1962)

- Born: April 15, 1962 (age 63); London, Ontario, Canada
- Occupation: Actor

Michael McManus (born April 15, 1962) is a Canadian actor who played the ex-assassin Kai in the science fiction series Lexx.

== Early life ==
Michael McManus was born on April 15, 1962, in London, Ontario, Canada.

== Career ==
He has appeared in various television and film roles including Forever Knight, A Taste of Shakespeare, and the 1994 film Paint Cans, opposite Neve Campbell.

== Filmography ==
=== Film ===
Year	Title	Role	Notes
1989	Speaking Parts	Lance	
1994	Paint Cans	Jeff	
1998	Dog Park	Derrick, the Waiter	
2004	Alle Lieben Ihre Kinder	Hitman	Germany 2004
2009	Blissestrasse	Pastor William	Produced and written by Paul Donovan

=== Television ===
Year	Film	Role	Notes
1988	The Killing Ground	Randell	Television movie
1988	The Squamish Five	Brent Taylor	Television movie
1990	Inside Stories	Terry Dempsey	Television movie
1992	Forever Knight	Father Pierre Rochefort	Episode: "For I Have Sinned"
1993	Family Pictures	Philip O'Casey	Television movie
1993	Sound and the Silence, the Story of Alexander Graham Bell	Bert Grosevenor	Canadian Television miniseries
1997	Lexx: The Dark Zone	Kai	4 episodes
1997–2002	Lexx	Kai	61 episodes
1998	Nothing Sacred	Viktor	Television movie
1998	Hard to Forget	John Gilman	Television movie
2000	The Secret Adventures of Jules Verne	Sir Nigel Hartwell	Episode: "The Book of Knowledge"
2001	A Taste of Shakespeare	Edmund	1 episode

== Award nominations ==
Year	Award	Result	Category	Film or series
1990	Genie Award	Nominated	Best Performance by an Actor in a Leading Role	Speaking Parts
