= For Those I Loved =

1983 film by Robert Enrico

- French theatrical release poster
- Directed by: Robert Enrico
- Written by: Max Gallo
- Produced by: Pierre David; Robert Enrico
- Starring: Michael York; Jacques Penot; Macha Méril; Helen Hughes; Jean Bouise; Brigitte Fossey
- Cinematography: François Catonné
- Edited by: Patricia Nény; Sophie Cornu
- Music by: Maurice Jarre
- Production companies: Les Productions Mutuelles Ltée; Producteurs Associés; TF1 Films Production
- Distributed by: Cinema International Corporation (France)
- Release dates: 9 November 1983 (France); 12 October 1983 (Canada)
- Running time: 145 minutes
- Countries: Canada; France; Hungary
- Languages: English; French

For Those I Loved (French: Au nom de tous les miens) is a drama film from 1983 with Michael York, about a Polish Jewish Holocaust survivor who emigrated to the United States in 1946. It was directed by Robert Enrico for Les Productions Mutuelles Ltée.

== Plot ==
The movie is based on the 1972 book titled For Those I Loved written by Martin Gray. The main character in the book belonged to the Reform Jews, where he lived with his family in Warsaw Ghetto after the German invasion of Poland. The character supports his family with black-market supplies and joins the Resistance. He is deported to the Treblinka camp, where he manages to survive and then escape. Afterwards he joins the partisan forces and then the Red Army, taking part in the Battle of Berlin.

After the war he left the Red Army and went in search of his grandmother, the sole survivor of his family. He found his grandmother in New York and emigrated to America. He became a successful businessman there. Then he married Dina, with whom he had four children. After the birth of their first child, the protagonist moved with his family back to France. There in 1970 his wife and children tragically lost their lives in a forest fire. In 1976 he married again and had three more children. He started a foundation to teach others about his experiences.

Holocaust historian Gitta Sereny has dismissed Gray's autobiographical book as a forgery in a 1979 article in New Statesman magazine, writing that "Gray's For Those I Loved was the work of Max Gallo the ghostwriter, who also produced Papillon. Some of Gray's claims of wartime heroism were dismissed in Poland as untrue by the Silent Unseen Captain Wacław Kopisto.

== Cast ==
- Michael York as Martin Gray
  - Jacques Penot as Young Martin Gray
- Brigitte Fossey as Dina Gray
- Macha Méril as Martin's mother
- Helen Hughes as Martin's grandmother
- Jean Bouise as Dr. Ciljimaster
- Wolfgang Müller as Mokotow
- Bruno Wolkowitch as Jurek

== Discography ==
The CD soundtrack composed by Maurice Jarre is available on Music Box Records label.
