= Wojeck =

Canadian television series

- Genre: Drama
- Starring: John Vernon; Patricia Collins; Ted Follows; Carl Banas
- Country of origin: Canada
- No. of series: 2
- No. of episodes: 20 (+ 1992 TV Movie)

Production
- Producers: David Peddie; Paul Almond; Ron Weyman
- Running time: 60 minutes

Original release
- Network: CBC
- Release: September 13, 1966 – March 12, 1968

Wojeck is a Canadian drama television series that aired on CBC Television from 1966 to 1968. It was arguably the first successful drama series on English Canadian television, and was the first TV series anywhere to regularly feature and focus on forensic pathology in the investigation of crime. Consequently, Wojeck has been hailed as an early forerunner of several successful shows that later explored the same genre, including The Expert (1968–76), Quincy, M.E. (1976–83), CSI: Crime Scene Investigation (2000–15), and Bones (2005–2017), among many others.

The de facto pilot for the show, produced in Canada by the CBC and featuring the entire cast of the series, aired as an episode of Bob Hope Presents the Chrysler Theatre titled "Tell Them the Streets Are Dancing" (broadcast March 17, 1966).

== Characters and plot ==
Similar to Route 66 or Naked City, Wojeck followed the "semi-anthology" format of often building the stories around the guest actors, rather than the regular cast. Still, the main four characters are at the centre of the show overall, and Wojeck's investigations generally drive the stories forward.

- Dr. Stefan "Steve" Wojeck is a crusading Toronto coroner who regularly fights moral injustices raised by the deaths he investigates. He often tackles tough and controversial issues. The character is Catholic, with Polish heritage.
- Steve's wife Marty Wojeck is frequently his sounding board at home. A former nurse, Marty looks after their two school-age children (who are often discussed, but very seldom seen on-camera).
- Crown Attorney Arnie Bateman is often, though not always, a force for trying to find a compromise between Wojeck's sometimes nearly-obsessive desire for justice and the practical realities of the justice system. This frequently puts Wojeck and Bateman at odds professionally, with Bateman finding Wojeck's "tilting at windmills" approach unhelpful and unsustainable, and a frustrated Wojeck finding Bateman cowardly or hypocritical. Nevertheless, they are (usually) able to put their differences aside in their personal lives and are shown to be good friends outside of work.
- Police Sergeant Byron James is also a work colleague and friend of Wojeck's, who is assigned specifically to the Coroner's Office as an investigator. Their relationship is noticeably less fraught than that of Wojeck and Bateman, with the quietly determined police sergeant – like Wojeck – intent on seeing criminal activity punished appropriately.

Wojeck was noted for its issue-driven stories, exploring topics that had rarely been directly confronted in television drama to that time, whether in Canada or elsewhere. Episodes of Wojeck deal frankly with abortion, homosexuality, drug addiction, systemic corporate and government corruption, negligence of the elderly, and other issues that were otherwise almost completely absent from TV programming of the era.

== Main cast ==
- John Vernon as Steve Wojeck
- Patricia Collins as Marty Wojeck
- Ted Follows as Crown Attorney Arnold (Arnie) Bateman
- Carl Banas as Sgt. Bryon James

== Production ==
The show was inspired by the career of Dr. Morton Shulman. Unusually for the time, episodes were shot almost entirely on location using hand-held cameras, giving the show a semi-documentary feel. The first season (1966) was filmed in black and white, while season two (1968) was shot in colour.

Wojeck also notably took a "rep company" approach to guest casting, with some guest stars appearing multiple times in different roles over the brief 20-episode run. Cec Linder starred in four episodes as four different characters, Robert Goodier played three characters over four episodes, and many, many actors appeared in three episodes playing three different characters. Margot Kidder (then billed as Margaret Kidder) appeared in only one episode (season 2's "After All, Who's Art Morrison?"), but it was her on-screen acting debut.

Although it was one of the highest-rated shows on Canadian television in its time, only 20 episodes of Wojeck were made, because series star Vernon was lured to Hollywood by the promise of more money and more consistent work than the CBC could offer. (Even after Wojeck's success, the CBC could not promise Vernon the show would return in 1969, as they had to wait for a year-end budget allocation.) Vernon only returned to the role once, for a TV movie Wojeck: Out of the Fire (1992).

== Episodes ==
=== Bob Hope Presents the Chrysler Theatre (1966) ===
No. overall	Title	Directed by	Written by	Original release date
1	"Tell Them the Streets Are Dancing"	Ronald Weyman	Phillip Hersch	17 March 1966
Wojeck deals with the case of a construction worker (Bruno Gerussi) whose crew was forced to work in tunnels where some of them contracted caisson disease.

- Seen in advance of the series. Though not conceived as such, it was a de facto "pilot" for the subsequent TV series.

=== Series 1 (1966) ===
- All series 1 episodes are in black & white.

No. overall	No. in series	Title	Directed by	Written by	Original release date
2	1	"The Last Man in the World"	Ron Kelly	Phillip Hersch	13 September 1966
Steve Wojeck investigates the suicide of a native from Moosonee who died in a Toronto jail cell, and uncovers aspects of the alien society which led him to his death.
3	2	"All Aboard for Candyland"	Paul Almond	Phillip Hersch	20 September 1966
Wojeck investigates the death of a drug addicted nurse who was a colleague of Marty's.
4	3	"Listen! An Old Man Is Speaking"	George McCowan	Phillip Hersch	27 September 1966
Elder abuse and an unscrupulous nursing home become the subjects of Wojeck's latest case.
5	4	"The Cold Smile of Friends (Part One)"	George McCowan	Phillip Hersch	4 October 1966
A patient of Wojeck's is a pregnant, unwed woman suffering from a critical illness. With Sharon Acker.
6	5	"The Cold Smile of Friends (Part Two)"	George McCowan	Phillip Hersch	11 October 1966
Wojeck is called to investigate the death of a doctor who was a suspect in an illegal abortion case. With Sharon Acker.
7	6	"Does Anybody Remember the Victim's Name?"	Ron Kelly	Phillip Hersch	18 October 1966
Wojeck is in political trouble when he investigates a killing of a murderer by a veteran police officer, and newspapers accuse the officer of police brutality. With Cec Linder and Peter Donat.
8	7	"Pick a Time – Any Time"	Paul Almond	Phillip Hersch	25 October 1966
A university student is found dead of an LSD overdose. With Michael Sarrazin and Dave Broadfoot.
9	8	"Thy Mother a Lady, Lovely and Bright"	Daryl Duke	Phillip Hersch	1 November 1966
Wojeck suspects negligence on the part of the hospital staff when a young woman dies in childbirth. With Louis Zorich.
10	9	"Another Dawn, Another Sunrise, Another Day"	Ronald Weyman	Phillip Hersch	15 November 1966
Wojeck thinks he may be on to a serial killer.

=== Series 2 (1968) ===
- All series 2 episodes are in colour.

No. overall	No. in series	Title	Directed by	Written by	Original release date
11	1	"Swing Low, Sweet Chariot (Part One)"	George McCowan	Phillip Hersch	2 January 1968
An automobile manufacturer deliberately tries to cover up a defective product. With Peter Donat and Michael Learned.
12	2	"Swing Low, Sweet Chariot (Part Two)"	George McCowan	Phillip Hersch	9 January 1968
With Peter Donat and Michael Learned.
13	3	"After All, Who's Art Morrison?"	Ronald Weyman	Grahame Woods	16 January 1968
A young homosexual man is arrested after a hotel killing. With Jack Creley and Margot Kidder. A prominent note at the beginning of the episode reads "All roles in the film are portrayed by actors."
14	4	"Another Wonderful Day"	Peter Carter	Len Barnett	23 January 1968
A death by food poisoning leads Wojeck to fear a contaminated food supply.
15	5	"Give Until It Hurts ... And Then Some"	John Trent	Sandor Stern	30 January 1968
A smallpox outbreak is potentially imminent.
16	6	"You've Been Very Kind"	René Bonnière	Lindsay Galloway	13 February 1968
Wojeck is not convinced that an attempted suicide is what it appears to be.
17	7	"Fair Egypt"	George Gorman	John Gray	20 February 1968
A museum wants Wojeck to autopsy an Egyptian mummy, while he simultaneously deals with a woman who seemingly wants to die.
18	8	"The Names of the Games That People Play"	Peter Carter	Jerry O'Flanagan	27 February 1968
Wojeck believes that members of a football team may be taking drugs when a player's girlfriend dies and pills are found on her body.
19	9	"Chocolate Fudge with Walnuts"	Daryl Duke	Sandor Stern	5 March 1968
Wojeck has suspicions about the death of a man who died on his way to a mental hospital from a convalescent home...and who has an unexpected connection to Wojeck.
20	10	"A Dime Harry Doesn't Need"	Ronald Weyman	Ronald Dunn and John Simpson	12 March 1968
An alcoholic friend of Wojeck's hits a man with his car.

=== Special (1992) ===
No. overall	Title	Directed by	Written by	Original release date
21	"Wojeck: Out of the Fire"	George Bloomfield	Malcolm MacRury based on a story by Ian Sutherland	15 March 1992
Wojeck returns to Toronto after working in a medical clinic in Sudan for 21 years, and catches up with old friends and family members. Arnie Bateman is now the Deputy Attorney General for the province of Ontario. Wojeck's now ex-wife Marti, who had initially accompanied him to Africa but left in 1978, works at a clinic for disabled children and is about to be remarried. Wojeck's daughter Anna, who was raised back in Toronto by her mother, works at a medical clinic; Wojeck's son died of meningitis in Africa in 1977. (In the original series, Wojeck's children were already in grade school by 1966; in this TV movie, son and daughter are born in 1965 and 1967, respectively.) Turned down for a job with the coroner's office due to a hiring freeze, Wojeck works at Anna's clinic and becomes involved in the plight of a family of refugees from Guatemala.

- This production was created as a stand-alone, feature-length special. Originally shot in 1990 (and directed by original series director Daryl Duke), the production initially fell apart before completion due to a number of factors including weather-related shooting problems, and network dissatisfaction with the completed scenes. The script was extensively rewritten and reshot two years later by a different writer and director, though some footage from 1990 was retained. John Vernon, Patricia Collins and Ted Follows returned from the original series; Carl Banas did not. Duration: approximately 89 minutes.

== Forensic pathology theme ==
An earlier television series that often featured forensic pathology in the investigation of crime was Perry Mason (1957–1966), based on a character that began appearing in novels in 1933.

Wojeck made the theme even more central to the premise of the show. Forensic pathology later became the central theme of several other TV mystery-suspense dramas, beginning with the BBC's The Expert in 1968. Other programs include:

- Quincy, M.E., United States, 1976
- Silent Witness, UK (BBC), 1996
- Da Vinci's Inquest, Canada (CBC), 1998
- Waking The Dead, UK (BBC), 2000
- CSI: Crime Scene Investigation, U.S. (CBS), 2000; and two spinoffs + a revival, including:
  - CSI: Miami, U.S. (CBS), 2002
  - CSI: NY, U.S. (CBS), 2004
  - CSI: Vegas, U.S. (CBS), 2021
- Crossing Jordan, U.S. (NBC), 2001
- Bones, U.S. (Fox), 2005
- RIS Delitti Imperfetti, Italy (Canale 5), 2005
- R.I.S, police scientifique, France (TF1), 2006
- Post Mortem, Germany (RTL), 2007
- R. I. S. – Die Sprache der Toten, Germany (Sat.1), 2007
- Rizzoli & Isles, U.S. (TNT), 2010
- Body of Proof, U.S. (ABC), 2011
- The Coroner UK, (BBC), 2015
- Coroner, Canada, (CBC), 2019

== Awards ==
- At the 19th Canadian Film Awards in 1967, Episode 1, "The Last Man in the World", tied for Best Film for TV. Cinematographer Grahame Woods won the award for Best Black-and-White Cinematography and Ron Kelly won for Best Director.
- In 2002, Wojeck became a MasterWorks honouree by the Audio-Visual Preservation Trust of Canada.
