= HMS Sapphire (1675) =

British Royal Navy ship wrecked in 1696

History

England
- Name: Sapphire
- Ordered: 30 September 1675
- Builder: Anthony Deane, Harwich
- Launched: June 1675
- Fate: Sunk on 11 September 1696

General characteristics
- Class & type: 32-gun fifth rate
- Tons burthen: 340 81/94 bm
- Length: 105 ft 8 in (32.2 m) (overall); 89 ft (27.1 m) (keel)
- Beam: 26 ft 10 in (8.2 m)
- Draught: 13 ft 2 in (4.0 m)
- Depth of hold: 10 ft (3.05 m)
- Propulsion: Sails
- Sail plan: Full-rigged ship
- Complement: 135/115/90
- Armament: Under 1677 Establishment: 32/28; Lower deck: 18 x demi-culverins; Upper deck: 10 x sakers; Quarter deck: 4 x minions; Under 1685 Establishment: 28; 16 × 8 pdr sakers; 10 × minions; 2 × 3 pdrs

HMS Sapphire was a 32-gun fifth rate of the Royal Navy, scuttled at Bay Bulls, Newfoundland, in 1696. It is currently a protected archaeological site. She was the only vessel of any size sunk in the Anglo-French wars in North America.

== History ==
HMS Sapphire (also spelled Saphire, and called Zephyr by the French) was designed and built by Sir Anthony Deane at Harwich in 1675, at a cost of £4,175.

In 1677, Sapphire was the first command of Cloudesley Shovell, who later became Admiral of the Fleet and eventually died in the Scilly naval disaster of 1707. The warship left England during King Williams’s War in April 1696 with orders to escort fishing vessels across the North Atlantic and protect them from the French, and remained active in the waters around Newfoundland after its initial escort task. The ship was under the command of Captain Thomas Cleasby, accompanied by Lieutenant James Brothers and 135 men. Sapphire was cornered in Bay Bulls Harbour by a French squadron on 11 September 1696. Cleasby, in fear that the French would capture the ship,

...decided to scuttle the ship, lighting it on fire and ordering his crew off the vessel. As the French scrambled to put out the fire, the English fled overland towards the colony of Ferryland. The fire on the Saphire spread to the powder room and sent the ship to the bottom of Bay Bulls Harbour.

Historian John Oldmixon described the battle thusly,

On the 11th September, the whole French Squadron came down upon the Saphire, and fir' d with the utmost Fury; Captain Cleasby made a brave Defence for 2 hours, and hall' d most of the Ship's Guns on her side next the Enemy; the French at the same time made a Descent, and having driven the Men that were ashore into the Woods, attack' d the Saphire on all sides; the Captain finding 'twas impossible to maintain the Ship any longer, set her on fire, and retir' d with his Officers and 35 Men to the Woods. When the Saphire was on fire, 40 French Men came aboard, endeavouring to extinguish it, but they were all blown up into the Air as soon as the Fire reach'd the Powder Room.

Cleasby escaped across land to the colony of Ferryland. There, he was captured and sent to France as a prisoner. He was eventually released as part of an exchange of prisoners. On 26 October 1696, he was tried under a Royal Navy Court Martial on the charge of "Loss of ship by setting on fire." A contemporary newspaper reported:

On Thursday at 11 a clock, was held a Court Martial, on board His Majesty's ship the Monmouth, riding at the Buoy in the Nore, Captain John Mundon President, for the tryal of Captain Thomas Clesby, for burning his Majesty's Ship the Saphire at the Bay of Bulls in Newfoundland, and upon a full hearing, he was honourably acquitted, and the Court was pleased to tell him, that he deserved a reward and preferment, for his courage and conduct in that Action.

Cleasby returned to Newfoundland the following year in command of HMS Lyme. He died 23 July 1718 at Greenwich Hospital.

== Excavation and protection ==
The wreck of Sapphire lies 61m from shore in approximately 15m of water. Salvage divers discovered the remains of Sapphire in the 1960s. The original discoverer is believed to have been Ernest "Ernie" Power, who discovered the cannons in 1969 and recovered an intact grey stoneware chamber pot from the site. Three cannons were retrieved and sold in 1972. What was then called the Bay Bulls Harbour Shipwreck was designated a Provincial Historic Site on 25 April 1974.

In response to looting, the Newfoundland Marine Archaeology Society (NMAS) performed the first initial excavation and survey on the wreck in 1974; over 300 artifacts were retrieved including examples of late seventeenth century glass and ceramics. A National Film Board documentary about the site was produced by Ted Remerowski in 1979, which chronicles a 1977 underwater archeological expedition led by Robert Grenier of Parks Canada to recover artifacts from the wreck.

Eventually about 2,500 artifacts were taken from the wreck and are in storage in St. John's and Ottawa. One notable artifact recovered was an Ottoman pipe bowl, or chibouk, one of only a handful found in North America. Also recovered in excellent condition was a nocturnal, with the paint used to highlight the incised numbers having survived.

In 1987, divers with the NMAS noted that the lead anchor for a nearby fish farm structure had been placed on the mounds of sandbags protecting the wreck; the owners of the fish farm relocated the anchor to a point south of Sapphire. In 1993, Sapphire was one of eight known archaeological wrecks of British warships from the circa 1700 period. Circa 1999, the HMS Sapphire Foundation was established to investigate creating an interpretation centre, which was never built. In 2003, the Provincial Archaeology Office (PAO) worked with the Bay Bulls harbour authority (BBHA) to ensure the wreck was protected while oil rig work was done close to the site.

The area of the wreck and surrounding debris fields, including any and all remaining in-situ artifacts, is protected under Newfoundland and Labrador's Historic Resources Act, and the site was listed on the Canadian Register of Historic Places on 23 August 2005. In 2014, it was reported to be "in relatively good condition, with much of the upper and lower decks preserved, but collapsed and covered in fine silt." It is a known spot for recreational divers.

== See also ==
- Colledge, J. J.; Warlow, Ben (2006) [1969]. Ships of the Royal Navy: The Complete Record of All Fighting Ships of the Royal Navy from the 15th Century to the Present (3rd Rev ed.). London: Chatham Publishing. ISBN 978-1-86176-281-8. OCLC 67375475.
- Winfield, Rif (2009) British Warships in the Age of Sail 1603-1714: Design, Construction, Careers and Fates. Seaforth Publishing. ISBN 978-1-84832-040-6.
- Lavery, Brian (1981) Deanes Doctrine of Naval Architecture Conway Maritime Press. ISBN 0-85177-180-7.
- Barber, V.C. (1976) International Journal of Nautical Archaeology Vol. 5(4) pp. 353–356.
- Canadian Geographic Feb/Mar 1979 - An article that appeared in Canadian Geographic about the Sapphire.
- International Journal of Nautical Archaeology – 6.4, 1977 pp. 305–313
- Initial Report on the Underwater Survey and Excavation of the wreck of HMS Sapphire in Bay Bulls, 1977 (Newfoundland Marine Archaeological Society)
- Second Report on the Underwater Survey and Excavation of the wreck of HMS Sapphire in Bay Bulls, 1977 (Newfoundland Marine Archaeological Society)
- Third Report on the Underwater Survey and Excavation of the wreck of HMS Sapphire in Bay Bulls, 1977. Additional notes on wreck 1 are included. (Newfoundland Marine Archaeology Society)
- Final Report on the Underwater Survey and Excavation of the wreck of HMS Sapphire in Bay Bulls, 1977. (Newfoundland Marine Archaeological Society)
- Canadian Collector Vol 20(2), March 1985 – Artifacts of the Sapphire
