= The Squamish Five (film) =

Canadian docudrama TV film

- Genre: Drama
- Written by: Ken Gass; Terence McKenna
- Directed by: Paul Donovan
- Starring: Nicky Guadagni; Michael McManus; Robyn Stevan
- Theme music composer: Marty Simon
- Country of origin: Canada
- Original language: English

Production
- Producer: Bernard Zukerman
- Cinematography: Richard Leiterman
- Editor: Gordon McClellan
- Running time: 85 minutes
- Production company: Canadian Broadcasting Corporation

Original release
- Network: CBC
- Release: September 16, 1988

The Squamish Five is a Canadian docudrama television film, directed by Paul Donovan and broadcast by CBC Television in 1988. The film dramatizes the story of the Squamish Five, the Canadian activist group responsible for the Litton Industries bombing of 1982.

The film's cast included Nicky Guadagni as Ann Hansen, Michael McManus as Brent Taylor, Robyn Stevan as Juliet Belmas, Albert Schultz as Doug Stewart, and David McLeod as Gerry Hannah.

The film faced some criticism for centring Belmas' perspective over those of the other members of the group; however, the producers noted that since Belmas was the only one of the five who had agreed to cooperate with the filmmakers, hers was the only perspective available to build the film's story around.

The film received a preview screening on September 16, 1988, at the 1988 Toronto International Film Festival, in advance of its television premiere on November 6.

== Awards ==
Award	Date of ceremony	Category	Nominees	Result	Reference
Gemini Awards	1989	Best Television Movie or Miniseries	Bernard Zukerman	Won	
Gemini Awards	1989	Best Supporting Actress in a Dramatic Program or Miniseries	Nicky Guadagni	Nominated	
Gemini Awards	1989	Best Direction in a Dramatic Program or Miniseries	Paul Donovan	Nominated	
Gemini Awards	1989	Best Production Design or Art Direction	Marian Wihak	Nominated	
