= Speaking Parts =

1989 Canadian film by Atom Egoyan

- Directed by: Atom Egoyan
- Written by: Atom Egoyan
- Produced by: Atom Egoyan; Camelia Frieberg (delegate producer)
- Starring: Michael McManus; Arsinée Khanjian; Gabrielle Rose; Tony Nardi; David Hemblen; Patricia Collins
- Cinematography: Paul Sarossy
- Edited by: Bruce McDonald
- Music by: Mychael Danna
- Distributed by: Zeitgeist Films (USA)
- Release dates: 8 September 1989 (Toronto Festival of Festivals); 27 July 1990 (Netherlands)
- Running time: 93 minutes
- Country: Canada
- Language: English
- Budget: CA$800,000

Speaking Parts is a 1989 Canadian drama film written and directed by Atom Egoyan. It received a Best Motion Picture nomination and five others at the 1989 Genie Awards, was nominated for the Gold Hugo at the Chicago International Film Festival, and won Best Canadian Screenplay at the Vancouver International Film Festival.

== Plot ==
Lance is a struggling bit-part actor who works as a hotel custodian. His supervisor arranges for him to moonlight as a gigolo for hotel guests. A co-worker, Lisa, is obsessed with him and rents every film in which he appears as an extra from Eddy's video store; he never has any speaking parts.

Lance finds a script left in a hotel room and slips his acting résumé under the door. The occupant turns out to be Clara, a screenwriter developing a television movie based on the true story of her deceased brother. Clara recommends Lance for the lead, and the two begin an affair. As production advances, Clara grows increasingly distressed as the film's producer reshapes a story that is deeply personal to her. The lives of Lance, Lisa, and Clara, and the tangle of relationships between them, begin to unravel.

== Cast ==
- Michael McManus as Lance
- Arsinée Khanjian as Lisa
- Gabrielle Rose as Clara
- Tony Nardi as Eddy
- David Hemblen as the Producer
- Patricia Collins as the Housekeeper

== Reception ==
On review aggregator Rotten Tomatoes, the film holds a score of 100% based on 8 reviews, with an average rating of 7.3/10.
