= The Second Time Around (2016 film) =

- Poster
- Directed by: Leon Marr
- Written by: Leon Marr; Sherry Soules
- Produced by: Leon Marr; Sherry Soules
- Starring: Linda Thorson; Stuart Margolin; Laura de Carteret; Louis Del Grande; Jayne Eastwood; Alexis Harrison
- Cinematography: Ludek Bogner
- Edited by: Saul Pincus
- Production company: The Second Time Around
- Distributed by: First Run Features
- Release date: 2016
- Running time: 107 minutes
- Country: Canada
- Language: English

The Second Time Around is a 2016 Canadian romance film directed by Leon Marr and starring Linda Thorson and Stuart Margolin.

== Plot ==
Two older people find, unpredictably, a sweet and deep connection developing as fellow residents in a retirement community. Opera, family, friends and health challenges are part of their adventure into later life love.

== Cast ==
- Linda Thorson as Katherine Mitchell
- Stuart Margolin as Isaac Shapiro
- Laura de Carteret as Helen, Katherine's daughter
- Louis Del Grande as Charlie
- Jayne Eastwood as Betty
- Alexis Harrison as Sarah, Katherine's granddaughter
- Martha Gibson as Alice
- Don Francks as Murray
- Paul Soles as Marvin
- Richard Waugh as Dr. Norris

== Reception ==
On the review aggregator website Rotten Tomatoes, 82% of 11 critics' reviews are positive, with an average rating of 6.4/10.

Brad Wheeler of The Globe and Mail awarded the film three stars out of four. Bruce DeMara of the Toronto Star awarded it two and a half stars out of four. Bill Brownstein of the Montreal Gazette gave the film three and a half stars.

Frank Ochieng of Screen Anarchy gave the film a positive review and wrote, "Nevertheless, the main ingredients that allow The Second Time Around to effectively resonate are its two veteran leads in the always radiant Linda Thorson and spunky Stuart Margolin."

Chris Knight of the National Post also gave the film a positive review and wrote, "If you need a break from aliens, superheroes and explosions, you could do worse."
