= Inside Stories =

Canadian television series

Inside Stories is a Canadian television drama anthology series that aired on CBC Television from 1988 to 1991. The series aired half-hour short dramas telling stories written and directed by members of ethnic minority communities.

The series was created by Paul de Silva. It was initially produced for CBC Toronto, before being expanded into a national network series for the 1990–91 season. The network cancelled the series in 1991, although repeats continued to air on occasion until 1993.

== Episodes ==
The series consisted of three 13-episode seasons; however, not all episode titles have been located. Known episodes included:

1. "Cement Soul" — An Italian Canadian mother whose construction worker son is dying tries to find a way to honour his wish to have his body entombed in cement instead of being buried in a traditional coffin.
2. "The Twin" — Marc Gomes stars as twin brothers, one an ad executive who was raised as the adopted child of a wealthy Toronto family while the other remained in their native Jamaica and grew up to become a Rastafarian, who are reuniting for the first time.
3. "Looking for Nothing" — Hrant Alianak stars as the administrator of an Armenian club, who is convinced that there's a security threat when the Premier of Ontario is coming to his facility to give a speech. Directed by Atom Egoyan.
4. "Be My Guest" — A couple tries to help a new Polish immigrant adapt to life in Toronto.
5. "Gracie" — Gracie (Rachael Crawford) is caught in the middle of a family feud between her mother (Taborah Johnson) and grandmother (Jackie Richardson).
6. "In Limbo" — Deepa Mehta stars as a Sri Lankan doctor building a new life after emigrating to Canada.
7. "The Comic Book Chase" — A young Chinese Canadian boy saves his mother and himself from eviction after finding a valuable rare comic book.
8. "Here Comes the Groom" — A Black Canadian law student who is about to get married needs to find out more information about her estranged father whom she never knew.
9. "Welcome Home Hero" — Two estranged indigenous Canadian brothers (Tom Jackson, René Highway) reunite after their father's death.
10. "Baby Pinsky" — Two generations of a Jewish family disagree about the morality of circumcision.
11. "Heartbreak Hoteru" — Denis Akiyama stars as Aaron Iwata, a Japanese Canadian man working as an Elvis Presley impersonator, who enters a bowling competition to win the money to buy out his younger brother's share of the family motel after their father's death.
12. "Voodoo Taxi" — Two Haitian Canadian taxi drivers in Montreal exact revenge on a racist boss.
13. "Home on the Range" — An Indo-Canadian lawyer from Toronto (Sugith Varughese) moves to rural Saskatchewan.
14. "The Peggy"
15. "Dayglo Warrior"

== Awards ==
Award	Date of ceremony	Category	Nominees	Result	Reference
Gemini Awards	1989	Best Short Drama	"Gracie"	Won	
Gemini Awards	1989	Best Leading Actress in a Dramatic Program or Miniseries	Rachael Crawford, "Gracie"	Nominated	
Gemini Awards	1989	Best Leading Actress in a Dramatic Program or Miniseries	Deepa Mehta, "In Limbo"	Nominated	
Gemini Awards	1989	Best Direction in a Dramatic Program or Miniseries	Atom Egoyan, "Looking for Nothing"	Nominated	
Gemini Awards	1989	Best Original Music for a Program or Miniseries	Glenn Morley and Lawrence Shragge, "In Limbo"	Nominated	
Gemini Awards	1989	Multiculturalism Award	Inside Stories	Won	
