= The Struggle for Democracy =

Canadian documentary television series

The Struggle for Democracy is a Canadian documentary television series that premiered in 1989. Hosted by Patrick Watson, the series profiled the birth and evolution of democracy, including both the challenges and the opportunities that lay ahead for it in the future.

The series was also paired with a companion book, co-written by Watson and Benjamin Barber, and published by Lester & Orpen Dennys.

Production on the series was first announced in 1987, when Watson stepped down as host of the business news series Venture to begin work on the project. The series premiered January 8, 1989, airing simultaneously in English on CBC Television and in French on Télévision de Radio-Canada. It later aired on PBS in the United States in 1989, and ITV in the United Kingdom in 1990.

The series did face some minor criticism for the fact that due to the rapidly-changing geopolitical climate of the late 1980s, it had been completed too early to cover some noteworthy events at all, including the Tiananmen Square protests and the Soviet Bloc Revolutions of 1989. Following the original ten-episode 1989 series, Watson created a sequel special in 1990, covering the events in China and Eastern Europe.

== Episodes ==
No.	Title	Original release date
1	Genesis	January 8, 1989
2	Reborn in America	January 15, 1989
3	Chiefs and Strongmen	January 29, 1989
4	The Tyranny of the Majority	February 5, 1989
5	The Rule of Law	February 12, 1989
6	The Last Citizens	February 19, 1989
7	The First Freedom	February 26, 1989
8	The Price of Democracy	March 5, 1989
9	A Soldier's Duty	March 19, 1989
10	Whither Democracy?	March 26, 1989
11	The Curtain Rises	June 24, 1990

== Awards ==
Award	Date of ceremony	Category	Nominees	Result	Reference
Gemini Awards	1989	Best Documentary Series	Ted Remerowski	Won	
Gemini Awards	1989	Gordon Sinclair Award	Patrick Watson	Won	
Gemini Awards	1989	Best Original Music for a Series	Micky Erbe and Maribeth Solomon, "The First Freedom"	Won	
Gemini Awards	1989	Best Picture Editing in an Information or Documentary Program or Series	John Gareau, "Chiefs and Strongmen"	Nominated	
Gemini Awards	1989	Best Picture Editing in an Information or Documentary Program or Series	Fred Gauthier, "The Tyranny of the Majority"	Nominated	
Gemini Awards	1989	Sound in an Information or Documentary Program or Series	Ian Challis, Wesley J. Blanchard, Tibor Gyokeres and Paul Massey, "Reborn in America"	Won	
Gemini Awards	1990	Best Photography in an Information/Documentary Program or Series	Michael Boland, "The Curtain Rises"	Nominated	
