= A Vow to Kill =

1995 American film

- poster artwork
- Genre: Drama; Mystery
- Written by: Sean Silas; Renee Longstreet; Harry Longstreet
- Directed by: Harry Longstreet
- Starring: Richard Grieco; Julianne Phillips; Gordon Pinsent; Peter MacNeill; Tom Cavanagh
- Country of origin: United States
- Original language: English

Production
- Executive producer: Julian Marks
- Producer: Renee Longstreet
- Production location: Toronto
- Cinematography: François Protat
- Running time: 97 minutes
- Production companies: Power Pictures; Wilshire Court Productions

Original release
- Release: February 1, 1995

A Vow to Kill is a 1995 made for TV movie directed by Harry Longstreet, starring Richard Grieco and Julianne Phillips, and first televised on February 1, 1995. Others in the cast include Peter MacNeill, Tom Cavanagh, Nicole Oliver and Larissa Laskin.

== Plot ==
L.J. Berman (Larissa Laskin) is a deceitful psychotic conwoman. Eric (Richard Grieco) is married to beautiful, rich Rachel Waring (Julianne Phillips). He fakes himself and his wife being kidnapped in order to get ransom money from her father, Frank (Gordon Pinsent).

== Cast ==
- Richard Grieco as Eric
- Julianne Phillips as Rachel Waring
- Gordon Pinsent as Frank Waring
- Peter MacNeill as Sam Flowers
- Tom Cavanagh as Andy Neiman
- Nicole Oliver as Linda Mason
- Larissa Laskin as L.J. Berman
- Lili Francks as Naomi Mills
- Dan Warry-Smith as Kevin Anson
- Christina Collins as Jack Flash Manager
- Andy Marshall as Walter
- Don Francks as Smithford
- Phil Morrison as Swift-Way Delivery
- Melanie Nicholls-King as Car Rental Agent
- Patrick Patterson as Bob Lambert
- Elva Mai Hoover as Ida Lambert
- Damir Andrei as Everett Thayer
- Ron Van Hart as Michael
- Jed Dixon as Security Officer
- Carolyn J. Silas as Air Freight Clerk
- Joe Coughlin as Vince
- Ho Chow as Swift-Way Clerk
- Fiona Highet as Jack Flash Messenger

== Reception ==
The film can be considered a damsel-in-distress drama, featuring light bondage, and details Rachel's plight in trying to escape from the mean thug.

Variety wrote, "Physically if not emotionally, Grieco and Phillips manage to register blips on the tube even when they haven’t anything to say to each other, which is most of the time. The lovers’ romantic dialogue sounds as hollow as lines on a Hallmark card", and also wrote, "Director Harry S. Longstreet, who co-wrote the script with his wife, Renee (also the show’s producer), and Sean Silas, manages to maintain suspenseful pacing while making a movie that is centered on only Grieco and Phillips in their faraway island fairyland."

VideoHound's Golden Movie Retriever called the film a "Predictable cable thriller", and Chicago Sun-Times succinctly called the film a "stupid, sexist movie".
