= Mama's Going to Buy You a Mockingbird =

- Genre: Drama
- Written by: Anna Sandor; Jean Little
- Directed by: Sandy Wilson
- Starring: Linda Griffiths; Geoffrey Bowes; Louis Tripp; Marsha Moreau; Martha Gibson
- Theme music composer: Tommy Ambrose; Rick Wilkins
- Country of origin: Canada
- Original language: English

Production
- Producer: Bill Gough
- Cinematography: Ken Gregg
- Editor: Bruce Annis
- Running time: 96 minutes

Original release
- Network: CBC Television
- Release: December 4, 1988

Mama's Going to Buy You a Mockingbird is a Canadian television film, directed by Sandy Wilson and broadcast by CBC Television in 1988. Adapted from the novel by Jean Little, the film centres on the Talbots, a family in the late 70s who are coping with father John's (Geoffrey Bowes) diagnosis with and death of cancer.

The cast includes Linda Griffiths as Kate Talbot, Louis Tripp as son Jeremy, Marsha Moreau as daughter Sarah and Martha Gibson as Aunt Margery, as well as Ken James, Rosa Anderson-Barker, Helen Hughes, Sam Aaron, Stuart Clow, Alana Shields, Sherry Bie, Lori Chodos, Mark Schofield, Jason Kravice, Jason Sorokin, Tommy Max, Gay Claitman and Steven Aiken in supporting roles.

The film was broadcast on December 4, 1988.

== Awards and nominations ==
Award	Year	Category	Nominee(s)	Result	Ref.
Gemini Awards	1989	Best Costume Design	Ada Kangyal	Nominated	
Gemini Awards	1989	Best Original Music for a Program or Mini-Series	Tommy Ambrose, Rick Wilkins	Nominated	
