= Sugartime (film) =

1995 American television film

- Television release poster
- Genre: Crime; Drama; Romance
- Based on: Roemer: Man Against the Mob by William F. Roemer Jr.
- Written by: Martyn Burke
- Directed by: John N. Smith
- Starring: John Turturro; Mary-Louise Parker; Elias Koteas; Maury Chaykin; Louis Del Grande; Deborah Duchêne; Larissa Laskin
- Composer: Sidney James
- Country of origin: United States
- Original language: English

Production
- Executive producer: Gale Anne Hurd
- Producer: David Coatsworth
- Production location: Toronto, Ontario, Canada
- Cinematography: Pierre Letarte
- Editor: Ralph Brunjes
- Running time: 111 minutes
- Production companies: HBO Pictures; Pacific Western

Original release
- Network: HBO
- Release: November 25, 1995

Sugartime is a 1995 American crime HBO television film directed by John N. Smith and written by Martyn Burke. It is based on the 1991 book Roemer: Man Against the Mob by William F. Roemer Jr. The film focuses on the true story of the affair between singer Phyllis McGuire of The McGuire Sisters, and Mafia boss Sam Giancana, famous for his alleged connections to John F. Kennedy and Frank Sinatra. It stars John Turturro, Mary-Louise Parker, Elias Koteas, Maury Chaykin, Louis Del Grande, Deborah Duchêne and Larissa Laskin. The film premiered on HBO on November 25, 1995.

== Plot ==
In the late 1950s, Chicago Outfit boss Sam Giancana becomes infatuated with singer Phyllis McGuire of The McGuire Sisters after seeing her perform in Las Vegas. Although Phyllis is initially wary of Giancana's reputation, the two begin a passionate and highly publicized affair. Giancana aggressively courts her, boasting about the extravagant lengths he has gone to create romantic settings and demanding, "Look at me when I'm talking at you," reflecting his controlling personality.

Their relationship is marked by constant tension between Giancana's possessiveness and Phyllis's determination to remain independent. During one of their early encounters, Giancana dismissively tells her to "stick to singing," but Phyllis refuses to be intimidated, insisting she will "stick to whatever I feel like." Their verbal sparring continues as they exchange sarcastic remarks, with Phyllis challenging his arrogance and Giancana responding with amused confidence before acknowledging that perhaps neither of them is who the other believes.

As their romance intensifies, Giancana's influence extends into politics, organized crime, and the entertainment industry. He becomes involved in clandestine discussions concerning Cuba, casino interests in Havana, and federal surveillance, even demanding that the FBI redirect its wiretapping efforts toward television personality Dan Rowan instead of his own organization.

The federal government's campaign against organized crime eventually catches up with Giancana. Called before Robert F. Kennedy's Senate investigations, he repeatedly invokes his constitutional rights, declining to answer questions about his status within the Mafia and allegations that rivals are murdered on his orders. His public silence contrasts sharply with his private confidence and growing frustration over increasing government scrutiny.

The relentless investigations, combined with pressure from law enforcement and rival criminal interests, strain Giancana's relationship with Phyllis. As his criminal empire begins to unravel, their affair becomes increasingly difficult to sustain. The film concludes by depicting the personal and emotional costs of Giancana's lifestyle, while emphasizing that his romance with Phyllis McGuire remained one of the most famous and controversial relationships linking organized crime and American popular culture.

== Cast ==
- John Turturro as Sam Giancana
- Mary-Louise Parker as Phyllis McGuire
- Elias Koteas as Butch Blasi
- Maury Chaykin as Tony Accardo
- Louis Del Grande as Chuckie English
- Deborah Duchêne as Christine McGuire
- Larissa Laskin as Dorothy McGuire
- Amanda Blitz as Annette Giancana
- Renessa Blitz as Francine Giancana
- Kelly Bodanis as Doris
- Bob Clout as Mr. McGuire
- Stuart Clow as Vince Inserra
- Bill Cross as Robert Maheu
- Reg Dreger as Wadden
- Greg Ellwand as William F. Roemer Jr.
- Ron Gabriel as Frederick Jones
- Carole Galloway as Mrs. McGuire
- Yamit Geiger as Bonnie Giancana
- Sam Grana as Johnny Roselli
- Howard Jerome as Russian Louie
- Nahanni Johnstone as Carlene Delfano
- Patrick Jude as Frank Sinatra
- David Keeley as Ralph Hill
- Deborah Kirshenbaum as Marie Perno
- John Kozak as Eddie Vogel
- Peter Krantz as Robert F. Kennedy
- Corinne Langston as Queen Mother
- Adam Large as Fanning
- John Lefebvre as Bennett Williams
- Vincent Marino as Jimmy Perno
- Robin McCulloch as Dick Martin
- Gerry Mendicino as Libonati
- Tony Munch as Moretti
- Michael Rhoades as Schippers
- Nicholas Rice as Judge Campbell
- Rino Romano as Phil Alderisio
- Tony Rosato as Frank Ferraro
- Chuck Shamata as Michael Delfano
- Ralph Small as John Bassett
- Jonathan Whittaker as Dan Rowan
