= Glory Enough for All =

- Movie poster
- Genre: Drama
- Written by: Grahame Woods
- Directed by: Eric Till
- Starring: R. H. Thomson; Robert Wisden
- Country of origin: Canada
- Original language: English
- No. of series: 1
- No. of episodes: 2

Production
- Executive producers: W. Patterson Ferns, Joseph Green, David Elstein
- Producer: Gordon Hinch
- Production companies: Gemstone Productions, Primedia Productions

Original release
- Network: CBC
- Release: 28 June 1988

Glory Enough for All is a 1988 Canadian television movie directed by Eric Till and written by Grahame Woods, depicting the discovery and isolation of insulin by Frederick Banting and Charles Best. It was the winner of nine 1989 Gemini Awards. The film stars R. H. Thomson as Banting, and Robert Wisden as Best. It is based on the books The Discovery of Insulin and Banting: A Biography by historian Michael Bliss.

It was aired in November 1989 in the United States in two parts as part of the PBS show Masterpiece Theatre and introduced by Alistair Cooke.

== Plot synopsis ==
The movie focuses on Banting and Best and their isolation of insulin at the University of Toronto for which Banting received the 1923 Nobel Prize along with John Macleod. A parallel story is told of Elizabeth Hughes, a young girl with diabetes.

== Cast ==
- R. H. Thomson as Frederick Banting
- Robert Wisden as Charles Best
- Michael Zelniker as James Collip
- John Woodvine as John Macleod
- Martha Henry as Antoinette Hughes
- Kate Trotter as Edith Roach
- Leah Pinsent as Margaret Mahon
- Rachel Blanchard as Melanie
- Seana McKenna as Jessica Collip
- Gerard Parkes as Duncan Graham
- Heather Hess as Elizabeth Hughes

== Reception ==
The movie was the winner of nine Gemini Awards at the 4th Gemini Awards in 1989, including Best Dramatic Mini-Series, Best Performance by a Lead Actor, Best Performance by a Lead Actress, Best Writing, Best Photography, and Best Musical Score among others.
