= Falling Over Backwards =

- Directed by: Mort Ransen
- Produced by: Mort Ransen; Stewart Harding
- Starring: Saul Rubinek; Julie Saint-Pierre; Helen Hughes; Paul Soles
- Cinematography: Savas Kalogeras
- Edited by: Rita Roy
- Music by: Milan Kymlicka
- Production company: Moving Image Productions
- Distributed by: Astral Films
- Release date: August 23, 1990 (MWFF)
- Running time: 100 minutes
- Country: Canada
- Language: English

Falling Over Backwards is a Canadian comedy film, directed by Mort Ransen and released in 1990.

== Plot ==
The film stars Saul Rubinek as Mel Rosenblum, a newly divorced schoolteacher suffering a mid-life crisis, who decides to reconstruct the happier times in his life by engineering the reunion of his divorced parents Harvey (Paul Soles) and Rose (Helen Hughes). Meanwhile, Mel himself is drawn into a nascent relationship with Jackie (Julie Saint-Pierre), his landlady, which is complicated when Jackie discovers that she is pregnant by her previous boyfriend and considers having an abortion.

== Cast ==
- Saul Rubinek as Mel Rosenblum
- Paul Soles as Harvey Rosenblum
- Julie Saint-Pierre as Jackie
- Helen Hughes as Rose Rosenblum
- Vlasta Vrána as Drunk
- Harry Standjofski as Club Manager
- Aidan Devine as Young Man

== Reception ==
The film was compared by critics to a Jewish version of a Michel Tremblay play. Ransen described it as the film that led to his decision to leave the National Film Board to work as an independent director, as he could not imagine the board approving the project.

The film received two Genie Award nominations at the 12th Genie Awards in 1991, for Best Supporting Actor (Soles) and Best Sound Editing (Gudrun Christian, Andy Malcolm, Michelle Cooke, Abby Jack Neidik and Diane Le Floch).
