= Leon Marr =

Canadian film and television director (1948–2019)

Leon Marr (May 26, 1948 – July 22, 2019) was a Canadian film and television director and screenwriter, who won a Genie Award for Best Adapted Screenplay at the 8th Genie Awards in 1987 for Dancing in the Dark. He was also a nominee, but did not win, for Best Director.

== Early life ==
Marr was born in 1948 in Toronto, Ontario, the son of a Jewish Polish father and a Catholic mother. The family name, before emigration to Canada, had been Marijinsky. Before becoming a notable film director, Marr attended both the University of Toronto and the Ryerson Polytechnical Institute.

== Career ==
Marr directed several short films, including Flowers In The Sand, co-written with Christine Cornish, the theme music for which was composed and performed by Dan Hill. He wrote several unproduced screenplays and worked as an assistant to Norman Jewison on the 1982 film Best Friends. The first longer film Marr worked on was known as Flyaway Paul, for which he wrote the screenplay in 1980. After the director decided to turn the movie into a comedy, production was cut and it was never released.

He first read Joan Barfoot's novel Dancing in the Dark in 1983, and worked for three years to get the film made after securing the rights.

Following Dancing in the Dark, Marr optioned the film rights to Judith Thompson's play I Am Yours; however, the financing didn't come through and the film was never made.

Marr subsequently worked primarily in television, directing episodes of Forever Knight, The Hitchhiker and The Hidden Room and taking a guest acting role in the pilot episode of Saving Hope. His second feature film, The Second Time Around, starring Linda Thorson and Stuart Margolin, was released in 2018.

Marr died on July 22, 2019, in Toronto.
