= 4th Gemini Awards =

1989 awards for Canadian television

The 4th Gemini Awards were held on December 4 and 5, 1989 to honour achievements in Canadian television. It was broadcast on CTV, with Martin Short as host.

Nominees were announced in October.

The most famous moment in the ceremony was the pairing of journalist Barbara Frum and sketch comedian Greg Malone as presenters; Malone was famous for impersonating Frum on CODCO, and came out dressed as Frum. This was in fact planned with Frum's full cooperation.

== Awards ==
=== Programs ===
Best Drama Series	Best Comedy Series
Degrassi Junior High; 9B; Danger Bay; Street Legal	Codco^{a}
Dramatic Mini-Series	TV Movie
Glory Enough for All; Glory! Glory!; Passion and Paradise	The Squamish Five; Two Men
Short drama	Animated program or series
Inside Stories: "Gracie"; My Brother Larry; One Boy, One Wolf, One Summer; What's Wrong With Neil?	Babar; Organic Chemistry 2: Life After Chemistry
Documentary program	Documentary series
Straight Shooter: The Story of John Phillips and the Mamas & Papas; The Displaced View; Music in the Midnight Sun; See No Evil; Shattered Dreams	The Struggle for Democracy; Profiles of Nature; Man Alive
Information program or series	Light information program or series
The Journal; The Fifth Estate; Midday; Monitor	On the Road Again; Live It Up!; FashionTelevision; The Originals
Variety series	Variety program
The Comedy Mill; Pilot One; The Tommy Hunter Show	The Kids in the Hall^{b}; 1988 Canadian Country Music Awards; Indian Time; Juno Awards of 1987
Children's program or series	Youth program or series
Mr. Dressup; Bob Schneider & The Rainbow Kids; Happy Castle	Wonderstruck; Skin; What's New; YTV Hits
Performing arts program	Sports program or series
Ravel; Eternal Earth; Loreena McKennitt: Breaking the Silence; Luba, Between the Earth & Sky; The Taming of the Shrew	1988 Summer Olympics; Blue Jays Baseball; Mario, Mike and Mister Greatness; Share the Flame: Calgary '88; World Cup Of Figure Skating
Special event coverage	
1988 Summer Olympics; The Molson Indy; Harness Racing on TSN: The North America Cup; Decision '88 – Election Night

=== Performance ===
Leading actor, drama series	Leading actress, drama series
Eric Peterson, Street Legal; Stefan Brogren, Degrassi Junior High; Robert Clothier, The Beachcombers; Derek McGrath, My Secret Identity; Robert Wisden, 9B	Stacie Mistysyn, Degrassi Junior High; Alex Amini, T. and T.; Janet-Laine Green, The Beachcombers; Dixie Seatle, Adderly; Joanne Vannicola, 9B
Leading actor, dramatic program or miniseries	Leading actress, dramatic program or miniseries
R. H. Thomson, Glory Enough for All; Peter Boretski, Einstein Tonight; John Woodvine, Glory Enough for All; John Vernon, Two Men	Martha Henry, Glory Enough for All; Rachael Crawford, Inside Stories: "Gracie"; Deepa Mehta, Inside Stories: "In Limbo"; Helen Shaver, No Blame
Supporting actor	Supporting actress
Jan Rubeš, Two Men; John Bayliss, 9B: "Accident"; Michael Ironside, One Boy, One Wolf, One Summer; Tony Rosato, Night Heat; Vladek Sheybal, Champagne Charlie	Martha Gibson, Two Men; Marie-Christine Barrault, No Blame; Patricia Collins, Two Men; Nicky Guadagni, The Squamish Five; Robyn Stevan, 9B: "Jealousy"
Performance in a guest role in a series	Performance in a variety or sketch comedy program or series
Gordon Pinsent, Street Legal: "World Class City"; John Colicos, Night Heat; Patricia Collins, Diamonds: "Little Girl Lost"; Colm Feore, Friday the 13th: The Series: "The Maestro"; Kay Tremblay, Night Heat	Dave Foley, Mark McKinney, Kevin McDonald, Bruce McCulloch and Scott Thompson, The Kids in the Hall; Bryan Adams, Bryan Adams Live in Belgium; Bob Einstein, Super Dave; Leslie Fields, The Big Top; Steve Smith, The Comedy Mill

=== News and sports ===
Gordon Sinclair Award	Reportage
Patrick Watson, The Struggle for Democracy: "Chiefs and Strongmen"; Eric Malling, The Fifth Estate: "Ten-42"; Peter Mansbridge, CBC News: Election '88; Brian Stewart, The Journal: "Children of Darkness"	Tom Kennedy, "China in Crisis"; John Burke, "Bus Hijacking"; Jim Munson and Roger Smith, "China In Turmoil"; Kas Roussy, "At the SkyDome"
Host, interviewer or anchor	Production of an information segment
Peter Mansbridge, China in Crisis; Hana Gartner, The Fifth Estate: "Michelle"; Peter Mansbridge, Sunday Report; Lloyd Robertson, Decision '88: Election Night; Valerie Pringle, Midday	CBC At Six: "Toronto: The Price of Prosperity/Cocaine Alley"; The Fifth Estate: "Ten-42"; The Journal: "Comrade Editor"; The Journal: "A Lover's Quarrel"; Venture: "Playing It for the Max"
Sports broadcaster
Brian Williams, 1988 Summer Olympics: "Ben Tests Positive"; Geoffrey Gowan and Don Wittman, 1988 Summer Olympics: "Ben Wins Gold"; Mark Hebscher, SportsLine

=== Directing ===
Drama or comedy series	Dramatic program or mini–series
Randy Bradshaw, Diamonds: "Man with a Gun"; Sturla Gunnarsson, 9B: "Nomination"; Sturla Gunnarsson, The Beachcombers: "The Gift"; David Winning, Friday the 13th: The Series: "Scarlet Cinema"; David Winning, Friday the 13th: The Series: "The Sweetest Sting"	Harvey Hart, Passion and Paradise; Paul Donovan, The Squamish Five; Atom Egoyan, Inside Stories: "Looking for Nothing"; Ken Jubenvill, One Boy, One Wolf, One Summer; Danièle J. Suissa, No Blame
Information or documentary program or series	Variety or performing arts program or series
John Zaritsky, Broken Promises; Barbara Boyden, Those Roos Boys and Friends; David Cherniack, Man Alive: "The Wheel of Rebirth"; Paul Cowan, See No Evil; Wendy Hill-Tout, Shattered Dreams	Ron Meraska, Juno Awards of 1987; David Acomba, 110 Lombard; Ian Murray, Veronique Hot; Larry Weinstein, Eternal Earth; Larry Weinstein, Ravel

=== Writing ===
Comedy or variety	Dramatic series
Dave Foley, Mark McKinney, Kevin McDonald, Bruce McCulloch and Scott Thompson, The Kids in the Hall; Tommy Sexton, Greg Malone, Cathy Jones, Mary Walsh and Andy Jones, Codco; Morag Smith and Steve Smith, The Comedy Mill	Chris Haddock, Night Heat; Fred Fox Jr. and Elliot Stern, My Secret Identity: "Eyes of the Shadow"; Peter Jobin, Timothy Bond and Roy Sallows, Friday the 13th: The Series: "Eye of Death"; Bruce Martin, Friday the 13th: The Series: "Better Off Dead"; J. K. E. Rose, Diamonds: "Little Girl Lost"
Dramatic program or miniseries	Information or documentary program or series
Grahame Woods, Glory Enough for All; Stan Daniels, Glory! Glory!; Robert Geoffrion and Jacqueline Lefevre, Champagne Charlie; Chris Haddock, Paper Route	Farley Mowat, The New North; Paul Cowan, See No Evil; Linden MacIntyre, The Journal: "Haunted by History"; Brian Stewart, The Journal: "Sudan"; John Zaritsky, Broken Dreams

=== Craft awards ===
Costume design	Production design/art direction
Martha Mann, Glory Enough for All; Ada Kangyal, Mama's Going to Buy You a Mockingbird; Mary Kerr, The Big Top; Shelagh Young, I Vant to Be Alone	Perri Gorrara, Glory Enough for All; Arthur Herriott, Two Men; Gerry Holmes, Diamonds: "Smiling Mortician"; Bruce McKenna, Tom Anthes and Fred Allen, CODCO: "Show No. 3"; Marion Wihak, The Squamish Five
Original music for a series	Original music for a program or miniseries
Micky Erbe and Maribeth Solomon, The Struggle for Democracy: "The First Freedom"; Don Gillis, Danger Bay: "Murder at the Aquarium"; Fred Mollin, Friday the 13th: The Series: "The Playhouse"; Jimmy Tanaka, Happy Castle; Domenic Troiano, Diamonds: "The Whistle Blower"	Louis Applebaum, Glory Enough for All; Tommy Ambrose and Rick Wilkins, Mama's Going to Buy You a Mockingbird; Georges Garvarentz, Champagne Charlie; Glenn Morley and Lawrence Shragge, Inside Stories: "In Limbo"; Raymond Pannell, Polar Passage
Photography in a drama program or series	Photography in a comedy, variety or performing arts program or series
Nikos Evdemon, Glory Enough for All; Malcolm Cross, Night Heat; Ken Gregg, Two Men; Rick Maguire, Street Legal: "Brotherhoods"; Michael Storey, 9B: "Nomination"	Andy Binnington and Mike Storey, In Rehearsal: Mozart's Don Giovanni; Chris Elias, Tom Farquharson, Michael Gyll, Ross Murray and Don Spence, Anne Murray's Family Christmas; Chris Elias, Don Spence, Michael Gyll, Gil Densham and Ross Viner, Juno Awards of 1987; David O'Keefe, Gary Foston and Gary Whitehouse, CODCO: "Show No. 3"
Photography in an information or documentary program or series	Picture editing in a drama program or series
Michael Sweeney, The Journal: "Sudan"; Bob Asgeirsson, Odyssey of Challenge; John Brett, Gilbert Van Ryckevorsel, The Nature of Things: "Rivers to the Sea"; John Dyer, Search for a Tropical Arctic; Yhoram Pirotsky, Bethlehem Journey	Jeff Warren 9B: "Nomination"; Dave Goard, Friday the 13th: The Series: "Wax Magic"; Gordon Stoddard, No Blame; David B. Thompson, Night Heat; Tim Williams, Champagne Charlie
Picture editing in a comedy, variety or performing arts program or series	Picture editing in an information or documentary program or series
Anthony Corindia. Luba, Between the Earth & Sky; Ewa Jaworska, Bruce Lange and Anthony Sloan, Ravel; Robert Megna, I Vant to Be Alone; Peter Ovens, In Rehearsal: Mozart's Don Giovanni; Margaret Van Eerdewijk, Eternal Earth	Sam Chu and Bruce Lange, Music in the Midnight Sun; Tom Cooper, The Nature of Things: "The Knowing Nose"; John Gareau, The Struggle for Democracy: "Chiefs and Strongmen"; Fred Gauthier, The Struggle for Democracy: "The Tyranny of the Majority"; Sidonie Kerr, Mile Zero: The Sage Tour
Sound in a drama program or series	Sound in a comedy, variety or performing arts program or series
John Megill, Marty Lacroix, Jim Hopkins, Chris Hutton and Paul Massey, Glory Enough for All; Terry Gordica, Tim Archer, Gary Daprato, Christopher Hutton and Steve Foster, Friday the 13th: The Series: "The Butcher"; Erik Hoppe, Jim Hopkins, Austin Grimaldi and Charles Bowers, Street Legal: "Principles"; Bruce Nyznik, Thomas Hidderley, James Porteous, Rick Ellis and Chris Hutton, Glory! Glory!	John Martin, Brian Avery, Denise McCormick and Tibor Gyokeres, Ravel; Peter Mann, Simon Bowers and Peter Campbell, Anne Murray's Family Christmas; Sue Robertson, Carla Densmore, Victor Pyle and Kevin Gillis, The Raccoons: "Life in the Fast Lane"; Aerlyn Weissman, Anthony Lancett and Hans Peter Strobl, Eternal Earth.
Sound in an information or documentary program or series
Ian Challis, Wesley J. Blanchard, Tibor Gyokeres and Paul Massey, The Struggle for Democracy: "Reborn in America"; Brian Avery, Barry Gilmore and Paul Massey, Music in the Midnight Sun; Stuart French, Nick Hector, James Porteous and Ian Hendry, Vista; David Picoski, The Journal: "Bootcamp"

=== Special awards ===
- Earle Grey Award: Sean McCann
- Multiculturalism Award: Inside Stories
- TV Guide's Most Popular Program Award: The Journal

== Notes ==
- ^a No other nominees were named in this category besides CODCO this year.
- ^bThe Kids in the Hall was a variety program, not a variety series, this year as only the original 1988 pilot episode had aired within the eligibility period for this year's awards, and the full series did not start airing until the eligibility window for the 5th Gemini Awards.
