= Ted Remerowski =

Ted Remerowski (born 1948) is a Polish-Canadian award-winning documentary filmmaker. After a rather circuitous passage through the Middle East and Europe, his family arrived in Canada in 1951. Growing up in Montreal, he graduated from McGill University's School of Architecture.

In 1979, he produced a documentary on the underwater excavation of HMS Sapphire in Bay Bulls, Newfoundland for the National Film Board of Canada. His later works include contributing to The Canadian Establishment, a series of one-hour documentaries first aired on CBC Television in 1980 for which he won the ACTRA Award for Best Television Program for that year. Earlier, he had won the Canadian Film Award as Best Editor for his work on Donald Brittain's The Champions. He won a Gemini and a Gemeaux as producer for The Struggle for Democracy. He won the Yorkton Short Film Festival award for his work on Frankensteer. He has been nominated numerous times for the Canadian Gemini Awards, including Best Writer for God's Dominion and Shanghai: A Tale of Two Cities, Best Sports Documentary for Dying to Win and Best Television Series for Legendary Sin Cities for which he was also nominated at the Canadian Screenwriting Awards in the Documentary category. He opened his own production company called Tremer Productions in 2006. In 2008 his documentary Dubai: Miracle or Mirage? was nominated for another Canadian Screenwriting Award. His next documentary Google World which premiered on CBC's Doc Zone examined Google and its move into cloud computing.
