= Martha Gibson =

Canadian actress

Martha Gibson is a Canadian actress. She is best known for appearing alongside her husband Louis Del Grande in the television series Seeing Things, for which she earned a Gemini Award for Best Actress in a Comedy Series at the 1st Gemini Awards in 1986.

She was nominated in the same category for the same show at the 2nd Gemini Awards in 1987.

At the 4th Gemini Awards in 1989, she won the award for Best Supporting Actress in a Drama Program or Series, for her performance in the television film Two Men.

Gibson also appeared in other notable roles in Black Christmas (1974), Outrageous! (1977) and Murder by Phone (1982), and television series such as King of Kensington, Katts and Dog and Sweating Bullets. As well as a cameo as the elderly cat lady in the Stephen King movie IT.

== Filmography ==
=== Film ===
Year	Title	Role	Notes
1974	Black Christmas	Mrs. Quaife	
1977	Outrageous!	Nurse Carr	
1982	Melanie	Waitress	
1982	Murder by Phone	Ms. Anderson	
2000	After Alice	Mrs. Lurie	
2016	The Second Time Around	Alice	
2017	It	Old Woman	

=== Television ===
Year	Title	Role	Notes
1977, 1979	King of Kensington	Mavis / Bunny Bird	2 episodes
1981–1987	Seeing Things	Marge Ciccone / Beverly	43 episodes
1983	Will There Really Be a Morning?	Script Girl	Television film
1986	The Marriage Bed	June Williamson	Television film
1987	Mama's Going to Buy You a Mockingbird	Aunt Margery	Television film
1990	Sanity Clause	Gloria	Television film
1991	Tropical Heat	Denise Lawson	Episode: "Big Brother Is Watching"
1991	Katts and Dog	Frances Riguerro	Episode: "Lethal Injection"
1991	E.N.G.	Shelley	Episode: "Lip Service"
1993	Family of Strangers	Sue	Television film
1995	Family of Cops	Party Guest	Television film
1997	Wind at My Back	Mrs. Mayhew	Episode: "A Meeting of the Clan"
1999	A Holiday Romance	Donna	Television film
2016	Between	Sandra	Episode: "Get Out of Town"
2017	Baroness von Sketch Show	Jolene's Mom	Episode: "You've Reached the Voicemail of Tracy Herrity"
