= Two Men (1988 film) =

- Genre: Drama
- Written by: Anna Sandor
- Directed by: Gordon Pinsent
- Starring: John Vernon; Jan Rubeš; Martha Gibson
- Country of origin: Canada
- Original language: English

Production
- Producer: Bill Gough
- Running time: 98 minutes

Original release
- Network: CBC Television
- Release: November 20, 1988

Two Men is a Canadian television film, directed by Gordon Pinsent and broadcast by CBC Television in 1988. The film stars John Vernon as Alex Koves, a Hungarian Jewish Holocaust survivor living in Toronto, Ontario, who discovers that Michael Barna (Jan Rubeš), the Nazi officer responsible for the death of most of Koves' family at Auschwitz, is also living in the city as a successful and respected businessman.

The cast also includes Martha Gibson, Patricia Collins and Lila Kedrova.

The film aired on November 20, 1988.

== Awards and nominations ==
Award	Year	Category	Nominee(s)	Result	Ref.
Gemini Awards	1989	Best TV Movie		Nominated	
Gemini Awards	1989	Best Performance by a Lead Actor in a Dramatic Program or Mini-Series	John Vernon	Nominated	
Gemini Awards	1989	Best Supporting Actor in a Drama Program or Series	Jan Rubeš	Won	
Gemini Awards	1989	Best Supporting Actress in a Drama Program or Series	Martha Gibson	Won	
Gemini Awards	1989	Best Supporting Actress in a Drama Program or Series	Patricia Collins	Nominated	
Gemini Awards	1989	Best Photography in a Dramatic Program or Series	Kenneth W. Gregg	Nominated	
Gemini Awards	1989	Best Production Design or Art Direction	Arthur Herriott	Nominated	
