= Deborah Duchêne =

Canadian actress

- Born: July 3, 1962 (age 63); Montreal, Quebec, Canada
- Occupation: Actress
- Years active: 1990–1996

Deborah Duchene (born July 3, 1962, in Montreal, Quebec, Canada) is a former film, television, and stage actress. She grew up in the U.S. and Canada, the daughter of a Baptist minister. She has appeared in film, stage and television with her most notable role being Janette in the Forever Knight series. She graduated from McGill University. One of her brothers serves in the U.S. Army. She has retired from acting, lives in Toronto, Ontario, Canada, and currently attends the University of Toronto majoring in music to become a teacher.

== Filmography ==
Year	Title	Role	Notes	Ref.
1990	Perfectly Normal	Denise	Theatrical film	
1990	My Secret Identity	Genevieve Mathier	Episodes: "Sour Grapes"	
1991	Top Cops	Lonnie Beam	1 episode	
1991	Top Cops	Kim Tonahill	Episode: "Memorial Show"	
1991	Beyond Reality	Kathy	Episode: "Range of Motion"	
1992	The Broken Cord	Allison Chapman	Television film	
1992	Vita da cane	Unknown	Theatrical film	
1992	The Women of Windsor	Alice	Television film	
1992–1996	Forever Knight	Janette DuCharme	Main role	
1993	Matrix	Ellen Young	Episode: "False Witness"	
1993	Counterstrike	Pamela Carson	Episode: "Peacemaker"	
1993	E.N.G.	Cindy Unwin	Episode: "Full Disclosure"	
1994	Street Legal	Mitzi Rose	Episodes: "The Firm", "The Long and Winding Road"	
1994	Whale Music	Bobby Sue	Theatrical film	
1994	Kung Fu: The Legend Continues	Mel	Episode: "Out of the Woods"	
1995	Sugartime	Christine McGuire	Television film	
1995	Side Effects	Dr. Alex Westwood	Recurring role	
1996	Kung Fu: The Legend Continues	Xenia	Episode: "Chill Ride"	
1996	Taking the Falls	Unknown	Episode: "Where There's a Will"	

== Stage performances ==
- A Funny Thing Happened On The Way to the Forum (1981)
- Agnes of God
- Canadian Gothic (1985)
- Dracula (1989)
- Hello From Bertha (1985)
- Lu Ann Hampton Laverty Oberlander
- The Playboy of the Western World (1984)
- Triptych (1992)

== Awards and nominations ==
Year	Award	Category	Title of work	Result
1996	Gemini Award	Best Performance by an Actress in a Supporting Role in a Dramatic Program or Mini-Series	Forever Knight (for episode #2.22: "Curioser and Curioser")	Nominated
