= Family of Strangers =

1993 TV film

- Genre: Drama
- Based on: Jody by Jerry Hulse
- Written by: William Gough; Anna Sandor
- Directed by: Sheldon Larry
- Starring: Melissa Gilbert; Patty Duke
- Music by: Peter Manning Robinson
- Countries of origin: United States; Canada
- Original language: English

Production
- Executive producers: Robert Lantos; Michael Weisbarth
- Producers: William Gough; John Ryan
- Production locations: British Columbia, Canada
- Cinematography: Ron Orieux
- Editor: Ralph Brunjes
- Running time: 90 minutes
- Production company: Alliance Communications

Original release
- Network: CBS; CTV
- Release: February 21, 1993

Family of Strangers is a 1993 American-Canadian made-for-television drama film directed by Sheldon Larry. The film, which stars Melissa Gilbert and Patty Duke, is based on a book by Jerry Hulse and was shot on location in British Columbia.

== Plot ==
Julie Lawson (Melissa Gilbert) is a professional researcher living with her daughter Megan (Ashleigh Aston Moore) in Seattle and has recently separated from her husband Sam (Eric McCormack) because he had an affair with his secretary. One day she blacks out while driving and crashes her car. In the hospital, the doctor (Mel Ryane) says she suffered an inflammation of the arteries to the brain, and a fatal blockage will soon happen unless she undergoes surgery immediately. Then the nurse warns her that if strokes run in the family, it would be too risky too operate. Julie contacts her father (William Shatner) to request this information, and he admits that she was adopted and he has no way to know if strokes run in her family. Shocked, Julie learns that her parents were not able to conceive, nor eligible to adopt, so they adopted Julie from the black market through a lawyer.

Determined to find her roots, Julie tracks down this lawyer. He has since died, but his son Bill Curtis (John Shaw) still runs his practice and provides Julie with some important documents that show that shortly after payments by Julie's adoptive parents, Curtis' father paid funds to a woman called Frances Thompson living in Cloverton, British Columbia. Assuming that this woman is her mother, she heads to Cloverton, where she learns that Frances was a 75-year-old former schoolteacher who recently died with her husband in a car accident. She further learns that their daughter Beth (Patty Duke) runs her own beauty parlor in the area. Realizing that Beth is her mother, she contacts her and quickly reveals her true identity. Beth initially denies the possibility of being her mother, but later reveals that she was raped after a school dance and gave birth to a baby while studying in Seattle. The possible rapists are the guys at the dance, including Matthew Saunders (Dax Belanger) who got addicted to drugs and later disappeared; Jake Gibson (Chris William Martin), who married her best friend Sue (Martha Gibson) and later died; and Tim Webster (Michael Gabriel) and Del Smith (Peter Stebbings), both of whom are still traceable.

Julie first traces down Del (Gordon Clapp), now a car salesman, telling him that she is a journalist writing an article on their homecoming then and now. Del attempts to force himself on her during a test drive, which scares her. She next contacts Tim (Chuck Shamata), whose name is quickly cleared as he reveals that he is infertile. After she leaves Tim's place, Del approaches her on the street, suspecting that she is in attempting to blackmail him for an affair. As he harasses her, he mentions that his father died from a stroke. Julie is convinced that Del is the perpetrator and panics, considering that she cannot have surgery if he indeed turns out to be her biological father. Meanwhile, Beth relives the rape in her memories and recalls the lack of support that her mother (Christina Jastrzembska) gave her. She remembers that she collected a button from the rapist which she kept secretly. She finds the button and notice that it belongs to a green jacket. Through a photo made at the homecoming dance, they learn that the rapist is Jake. Sue (Martha Gibson) is shocked to learn that her husband raped Beth and tells Julie that strokes did not run in his family. Afterwards, Julie returns to Seattle and successfully undergoes surgery. She reconnects with her adoptive father, gives Sam a second chance, and her mother arrives as she is recovering.

== Cast ==
- Melissa Gilbert as Julie Lawson
- Patty Duke as Beth Thompson
- Martha Gibson as Sue Gibson
- Gordon Clapp as Del Smith
- Chuck Shamata as Tim Webster
- Eric McCormack as Sam
- Ashleigh Aston Moore as Megan Lawson
- William Shatner as Earl
- John Shaw as Bill Curtis
- Stephen Dimopoulos as Wayne Anderson
- Mel Ryane as Dr. Fowler
- Tasha Simms as Nancy
- Michael Gabriel as Young Tim Webster
- Dax Belanger as Young Matthew Saunders
- Peter Stebbings as Young Del Smith
- Leslie Hopps as Young Beth Thompson
- Michelle Beaudoin as Young Sue Gibson
- Chris William Martin as Young Jake Gibson
- Christina Jastrzembska as Frances Thompson

== Reception ==
Reviewer of Variety wrote: "Gilbert and Duke turn in strong, believable perfs, and William Shatner is restrained as Gilbert’s hand-wringing adoptive father. [..] Director Sheldon Larry keeps the action moving swiftly and with little padding; tech credits are OK."
