= Helen Hughes (actress) =

American-Canadian actress

- Born: 8 January 1918; Johnstown, Pennsylvania, U.S.
- Died: 3 April 2018 (aged 100); Toronto, Ontario, Canada
- Occupation: Actress

Helen Hughes (January 8, 1918 – April 3, 2018) was an American-Canadian actress who has worked in theatre, television, and film.

== Biography ==
Born in Johnstown, Pennsylvania, Hughes did some acting while attending college; however, her undergraduate degree (from Indiana State Teacher's College, class of 1940) and her graduate study (at Penn State) were both focused on art education.

She became a permanent resident of Canada in 1972. Her move resulted from acting opportunities, when she performed in 10 weeks of summer theatre in Canada. "I discovered that I loved Canada", she said. A contributing factor in the decision was that her marriage had broken up. With her children grown, she felt free to make a change.

Hughes was nominated for a Dora Mavor Moore Award in 1986. She made her last appearance at age 96, as a guest actress in the TV series Sensitive Skin.

In 1980, Hughes starred in The 75th at the Lunchbox Theatre. in Alberta, Canada.

At the 10th Genie Awards in 1989, she received a nomination for Best Supporting Actress for her performance in the film Martha, Ruth and Edie.

Hughes also made TV commercials for American Express, Anacin, and one for Heinz ketchup that ran for about three years.

== Death ==
On April 3, 2018, Hughes died in Toronto, Ontario, at age 100 of natural causes.

== Selected filmography ==
Year	Title	Role	Notes
1977	Outrageous!	Mrs. Connors	
1979	Wild Horse Hank	Mrs. Webley	
1981	Incubus	Agatha Galen	
1982	Visiting Hours	Louise Shepherd	
1983	Au Nom de Tous les Miens	Martin Gray's grand-mother	
1985	The Peanut Butter Solution	Mary, the ghost in the Kitchen	
1987	Blue Monkey	Marwella Harbison	
1987	Night Friend	Nosy neighbour	
1988	Mama's Going to Buy You a Mockingbird	Mrs. Mandel	
1990	The Amityville Curse	Mrs. Moriarty	
1990	Falling Over Backwards	Rose	
1995	Billy Madison	2nd Grade Teacher	
1995	Tommy Boy	Boardroom Lady	
1996	Never Too Late	Eunice	
1996	Goosebumps	Grandma Rose	
1996	Night of the Twisters	Grandma Belle "Zephyr" Hatch	
1999	Storm of the Century	Roberta Coign	
