= The Whiteoaks of Jalna =

- Genre: Family drama
- Starring: Paul Harding; Kate Reid
- Country of origin: Canada
- Original language: English
- No. of episodes: 13

Production
- Producers: John Trent; Richard Gilbert
- Running time: 60 min (time slow)

Original release
- Network: CBC
- Release: 23 January – 30 April 1972

The Whiteoaks of Jalna is a 1972 Canadian television drama miniseries based on the Jalna novels by Mazo de la Roche. At CA$2 million, it set a record expense at the time for a Canadian television miniseries. The series was exported internationally including the United Kingdom and France. Scriptwriting was led by Timothy Findley, supported by Claude Harz and Grahame Woods.

== Production ==
- Due to the convoluted nature of the storyline, which jumped back and forth between the 1850s to the 1970s, CBC published a family tree of the characters in the miniseries, so viewers could follow the story.
- The miniseries was originally planned to extend beyond 13 episodes, but production was curtailed by a CBC technicians' strike that year.
- Despite this being a CBC production, the original run of the mini-series was blacked out on CKLW-TV in Windsor, Ontario (then partially owned by the CBC), as the CBC originally planned to sell the series to an American network or syndicator. Such a sale did not materialize.
- The miniseries was rebroadcast in 1974, but was re-edited with extra footage added and some scenes (especially those taking place in the modern day) cut.

== Sources ==
- TV North: Everything You Ever Wanted to Know About Canadian Television, by Peter Kenter and Martin Levin
