= Louis Del Grande =

Canadian television writer and actor (born 1943)

- Born: March 23, 1943 (age 83); Union City, New Jersey, U.S.
- Occupations: Actor, screenwriter, producer
- Years active: 1964–2016
- Known for: Seeing Things
- Spouse: Martha Gibson

Louis Del Grande (born March 23, 1943) is a retired American-Canadian actor, comedian, and television writer. He is best known as the co-creator and star of the mystery-comedy CBC Television series Seeing Things (1981–87). He won four Gemini Awards for his work on the series, two for Best Actor in a Comedy Series and two for Best Comedy Series.

== Early life ==
Del Grande was born and raised in Union City, New Jersey. At age 16, Del Grande began acting in New York City, eventually landing a part in the Oregon Shakespeare Festival.

== Career ==
Del Grande moved to Toronto in 1964, drawn to Canada by the Stratford Festival, and soon found work as a stand-up comedian and comedy writer. In 1975, he was hired as head writer for a new sitcom, The King of Kensington, which became a hit in Canada until the end of the decade. He also appeared in the show a handful of times as Fred, a friend of Al Waxman's lead character Larry King. Del Grande later became (with Jack Humphries) the show's co-producer (a Fifth Estate documentary said the two producers ran Kensington "with an iron hand").

After a brief stint in Hollywood, Del Grande returned to Toronto where he created, wrote and produced Seeing Things, which aired from 1981 to 1987. Del Grande played a crime-solving clairvoyant tabloid reporter who was separated from his wife Marge (played by Del Grande's real-life wife, actress Martha Gibson). The series was popular and won Del Grande four Gemini Awards, two for best actor in a comedy and two for the show itself.

Outside Canada, Del Grande is probably best known as the ConSec scanner in the infamous "head explosion" scene in the David Cronenberg movie Scanners. He has also appeared in numerous theatrical and television movies and series, including Monkeys in the Attic, Due South, The Outer Limits and Goosebumps.

== Personal life ==
Del Grande is married to actress Martha Gibson.

== Filmography ==
=== Film ===
Year	Title	Role
1973	Monkeys in the Attic	Frederick
1976	Second Wind	Howie
1980	Atlantic City	Mr. Shapiro
1981	Scanners	First Scanner
1981	Happy Birthday to Me	Surgeon
1983	Of Unknown Origin	Clete
1989	Speed Zone	Mr. Benson
1992	Buried on Sunday	Prime Minister
1993	Cadillac Girls	Adam
1997	Hostile Intent	Soames
2016	The Second Time Around	Charlie

=== Television ===
Year(s)	Title	Role	Notes
1973–75	Dr. Simon Locke	Man / Al Kutner / Boulder	3 episodes
1975–79	King of Kensington	Fred	Actor; 2 episodes Writer; 4 episodes
1978	Home to Stay	Richard	Television film
1978	Tom and Joann	Norman	Television film
1980, 1981	The Littlest Hobo	Kent / Detective Woods	2 episodes
1981	A Far Cry from Home	Lawyer	Television film
1981–87	Seeing Things	Louis Ciccone	Actor; 43 episodes Writer; 2 episodes Co-creator
1988	The Elephant Show	Willy Bookem	Episode: "The Early Years"
1990	Sanity Clause	Leo	Television film
1990	Clarence	Brimmer	Television film
1991	Tropical Heat	Glenn Lawson	Episode: "Big Brother Is Watching"
1995	Sugartime	Chuckie English	Television film
1996	Due South	Lyndon Buxley	Episode: "We Are the Eggmen"
1997	F/X: The Series	Director	Episode: "Medea"
1997	North Shore Fish	Markie	Television film
1997	Let Me Call You Sweetheart	Joe	Television film
1997	Galileo: On the Shoulders of Giants	Colombe	Television film
1998	The Outer Limits	Detective Renfro	Episode: "Criminal Nature"
1998	The Taking of Pelham One Two Three	Frank Stonehouse	Television film
1998	Goosebumps	Mr. Saur	Episode: "Say Cheese and Die... Again"
1998	The Dumb Bunnies	Mr. Grudge	Episode: "Stressed to Impress"
1998	Traders	Sonny Palin	Episode: "Independence Days"
1999	Family of Cops 3	Sean the Bartender	Television film
1999	Ned's Newt	Dump Hermit / Big Criminal	2 episodes
1999, 2002	Lexx	Louie / Roada	2 episodes
2000	Big Wolf on Campus	Dr. Frank Stein	Episode: "Frank Stein"
