= Paint Cans =

- Directed by: Paul Donovan
- Written by: Paul Donovan
- Based on: Paint Cans by Paul Donovan
- Produced by: Paul Donovan; Mike Mahoney
- Starring: Chas Lawther; Robyn Stevan
- Cinematography: Les Krizsan
- Edited by: David Ostry
- Music by: Marty Simon
- Production company: Salter Street Films
- Distributed by: Libra Films
- Release date: September 13, 1994 (TIFF)
- Running time: 93 minutes
- Country: Canada
- Language: English

Paint Cans is a 1994 Canadian comedy film written, produced and directed by Paul Donovan and based on his book of the same name. A satire of Canadian film and television production, the film stars Chas Lawther as Wick Burns, a bureaucrat in the Film Finance Office of Canada (a parody of Telefilm Canada) who is trying to help secure funding for Paint Cans, the directorial debut of his film school classmate Vittorio Russo (Bruce Greenwood), while simultaneously trying to navigate a new romantic relationship with Arundel Merton (Robyn Stevan), a journalist he met at the Cannes Film Festival.

Production on the film began in 1993, although some filming had to be postponed to early 1994 after Stevan broke her collarbone in a fall from a scooter.

The film premiered in the Perspective Canada program at the 1994 Toronto International Film Festival. It was subsequently screened at the 1994 Atlantic Film Festival, where it won the awards for Best Direction and Best Writing in an Atlantic Canadian Film.

== Cast ==
- Chas Lawther as Wick Burns
- Robyn Stevan as Arundel Merton
- Bruce Greenwood as Vittorio Musso
- Nigel Bennett as Bryson Vautour
- Don Francks as Maitland Burns
- Andy Jones as Neville Lewis
- Paul Gross as Morton Ridgewell
- Ann-Marie MacDonald as Inge Von Nerthus
- Neve Campbell as Tristesse
