= Larissa Laskin =

Canadian actress

Larissa Laskin is a Canadian actress whose credits include the A&E original film, The Golden Spiders: A Nero Wolfe Mystery (2000).

== Early life ==
Born Larissa Lapchinski, Laskin appeared under that name in a number of stage productions in the 1980s at the Stratford Festival in Ontario.

== Career ==
Laskin debuted in My Secret Identity in the early 1990s. In 2002-2003, she co-starred as Dr. Rachel Griffen in the medical drama Body and Soul on the PAX network. She also appeared as a doctor held hostage by a father (Denzel Washington) in an attempt to save his son in John Q. She was nominated for a Gemini Award in 1995, 1998, and 2003.

== Personal life ==
She was married to fellow Canadian actor Currie Graham.

== Filmography ==
=== Film ===
Year	Title	Role	Notes
1995	The Scarlet Letter	Goody Mortimer	
1996	Extreme Measures	Myrick's Daughter	
2002	John Q.	Dr. Ellen Klein	
2007	Fugitive Pieces	Irena	
2008	The Onion Movie	Dana Dobbs	

=== Television ===
Year	Title	Role	Notes
1988	The Taming of the Shrew	Townsperson	Television film
1990	The Hitchhiker	Gina	Episode: "Trust Me"
1990, 1994	Street Legal	Bianca Roberts / Angela Kos	2 episodes
1990	My Secret Identity	Star	Episode: "Bump in Time"
1991	Shining Time Station	Passenger	Episode: "Washout"
1992	Beyond Reality	Emma	Episode: "Siren Song"
1993	Matrix	Stephanie	Episode: "Lapses in Memory"
1993	Dieppe	Leith	Television film
1993, 1996	Kung Fu: The Legend Continues	Colleen	2 episodes
1994	Forever Knight	Emily Weiss	Episode: "Stranger Than Fiction"
1995	A Vow to Kill	L.J. Berman	Television film
1995	Heritage Minutes	Nurse Chorney	Episode: "Myrnam Hospital"
1995	Degree of Guilt	Ms Warner	Television film
1995	Sugartime	Dorothy McGuire	Television film
1996	F/X: The Series	Monica Dorsett	Episode: "The Ring"
1996	The Newsroom	Agent #2	Episode: "Dinner at Eight"
1996	Jack Reed: Death and Vengeance	Irina Lebit	Television film
1997	When Secrets Kill	Linda Emery	Television film
1997	Weapons of Mass Distraction	Lindsey Zarem	Television film
1997	Color of Justice	New York Assistant D.A	Television film
1997	The Visitor	Katherine	Episode: "Remember"
1997	The Pretender	Joellen Gillespie	Episode: "Over the Edge"
1997	Bella Mafia	Francesca	Television film
1997	Peacekeepers	Lillyanna Marinkovitch	Television film
1998	JAG	Corporal Sharon Dupree	Episode: "The Imposter"
1998	The Last Don II	American Woman In Sicily	Episode #1.1
1999	Da Vinci's Inquest	Special Agent Charlotte Turner	2 episodes
1999	Foolish Heart	Katherine Stewart	2 episodes
1999	Total Recall 2070	Jill Evans	Episode: "Astral Projections"
1999	Ricky Nelson: Original Teen Idol	Helen Blair	Television film
1999–2000	The City	Talia Onassis	12 episodes
2000	The Wonderful World of Disney	Miss Reeves	Episode: "The Loretta Claiborne Story"
2000	Psi Factor	Natalie Harnett	Episode: "'Til Death Do Us Part"
2000	The Golden Spiders: A Nero Wolfe Mystery	Jean Estey	Television film
2000	The Secret Adventures of Jules Verne	Saratoga Browne	Episode: "Southern Comfort"
2000, 2001	Earth: Final Conflict	Heather North	2 episodes
2001	Relic Hunter	Darcy Lowe	Episode: "Sydney at Ten"
2001	Our Hero	Nurse	Episode: "The Psycho Issue"
2002	Blue Murder	Bonnie Gage	Episode: "Spankdaddy"
2002	Mutant X	Pamela Fries	Episode: "Lazarus Syndrome"
2002	CSI: Crime Scene Investigation	Debbie Stein	Episode: "Cats in the Cradle"
2002	Recipe for Murder	Corinne Riggs	Television film
2002	Miss Miami	Helena	Television film
2002	Escape from the Newsroom	Larissa	Television film
2002	Scar Tissue	Shannon Nevsky	Television film
2002	Body & Soul	Dr. Rachel Griffen	9 episodes
2003	Star Trek: Enterprise	Calla, Vissian Engineer's Wife	Episode: "Cogenitor"
2004	Doc	Shannon Renfrew	Episode: "Arsenic and Old Spice"
2004	ReGenesis	Lynn Raskin	Episode: "The Oldest Virus"
2005	More Sex & the Single Mom	Megan	Television film
2005	Medical Investigation	Donna Lawrence	Episode: "Black Book"
2005	Vinegar Hill	Barb	Television film
2006	Without a Trace	Linda Ryder	Episode: "Expectations"
2006	The Unit	Julianna Nicholl	Episode: "Exposure"
2010	Smoke Screen	Candy	Television film
2012	Weeds	Elizabeth Kash	Episode: "Unfreeze"
2015	Those Damn Canadians	Gretchen	5 episodes
2017	When We Rise	Roma's Sister	Episode: "Night IV: Part VI and VII"
