= 2nd Gemini Awards =

1987 awards for Canadian television

The 2nd Gemini Awards were held on December 8, 1987, to honour achievements in Canadian television. It was broadcast on CBC.

== Awards ==
=== Best Comedy Program or Series ===
- Seeing Things
- Hangin' In

=== Best Dramatic Series ===
- Night Heat
- Red Serge
- Street Legal

=== Best Dramatic Mini Series ===
- Ford: The Man and the Machine
- Sword of Gideon

=== Best Information Program or Series ===
- The Journal
- Midday
- The Fifth Estate
- W5

=== Best Children's Series ===
- Degrassi Junior High
- Fraggle Rock
- Spirit Bay
- What's New?

=== Best Writing in a Dramatic Program ===
- Night Heat
- Street Legal
- The Beachcombers
- The Campbells

=== Best Writing in a Comedy or Variety Program or Series ===
- The S and M Comic Book
- Fraggle Rock
- Seeing Things

=== Best Direction in a Dramatic Series or Comedy Series ===
- Degrassi Junior High
- Danger Bay
- Seeing Things
- Street Legal
- The Campbells

=== Best Performance by an Actor in a Continuing Role in a Comedy Series ===
- Louis Del Grande, Seeing Things
- David Eisner, Hangin' In

=== Best Performance by a Lead Actress in a Continuing Role in a Comedy Series ===
- Dinah Christie, Check it Out
- Lally Cadeau, Hangin' In
- Martha Gibson, Seeing Things
- Janet-Laine Green, Seeing Things

=== Best Performance by a Lead Actor in a Continuing Dramatic Series ===
- Winston Rekert, Adderly
- Scott Hylands, Night Heat
- Pat Mastroianni, Degrassi Junior High
- Eric Peterson, Street Legal
- Allan Royal, Night Heat

=== Best Performance by a Lead Actress in a Continuing Dramatic Series ===
- Dixie Seatle, Adderly
- Stacie Mistysyn, Degrassi Junior High
- Nicole Stoffman, Degrassi Junior High
- Amber-Lea Weston, The Campbells

=== Best Performance by a Broadcast Journalist ===
- Joe Schlesinger
- Hana Gartner
- Eric Malling
- Terence McKenna

=== Earle Grey Award ===
- Lorne Greene
