= Robyn Stevan =

Canadian actress

- Occupation: Actor
- Years active: 1986–2003
- Height: 5 ft 6 in (168 cm)
- Awards: Genie Award

Robyn Stevan is a Canadian actress. She is perhaps best known for her role in the film Bye Bye Blues, for which she won the Genie Award for Best Supporting Actress at the 11th Genie Awards in 1990.

== Early life and education ==
Stevan developed an interest in acting in her last two years at Seaquam Secondary School in Delta, British Columbia. After that, she shifted her attention from her previous interests of rhythmic gymnastics and a possible career in medicine. She began studying a general arts curriculum at the University of British Columbia but left school to go to Japan to work on Rice Curry, a production of Fuji TV.

== Career ==
Stevan has appeared in the films The Stepfather (1987), Fire with Fire (1986), and Paint Cans (1994).

Stevan's performance in The Squamish Five brought her the Best Actor Award from the Atlantic Film Festival.

== Filmography ==
=== Film ===
Robyn Stevan film credits
Year	Title	Role	Ref.
1986	Fire with Fire	School Girl	
1986	The Christmas Star	Waters Kid	
1987	The Stepfather	Karen	
1987	Shelley	Shelley	
1988	Distant Thunder	Holly	
1989	George's Island	Miss Plivder	
1989	Bye Bye Blues	Frances Cooper	
1990	Sylvan Lake Summer	Allison	
1991	Stepping Out	Sylvia	
1992	Giant Steps	Leslie	
1994	Intersection	Step Magazine	
1994	Paint Cans	Arundel Merton	
1999	Pushing Tin	Sara	

=== Television ===
Robyn Stevan television credits
Year	Title	Role	Notes	Ref.
1986	Firefighter	Cindy's Sister	Television film	
1987	Sworn to Silence	Monica Fischetti	Television film	
1987	21 Jump Street	Kim	Episode: "My Future's So Bright, I Gotta Wear Shades"	
1987	The Little Match Girl	Lindsay Dutton	Television film	
1988	Friday the 13th: The Series	Debbie Napier	Episode: "What a Mother Wouldn't Do"	
1988	The Squamish Five	Julie Belmas	Television film	
1988	9B	Donna Remple	4 episodes	
1988, 1993	Street Legal	Various roles	2 episodes	
1993	Counterstrike	Joanie Simpson	Episode: "Free to Kill"	
1993	The Hidden Room	Amy	Episode: "My Sister's Keeper"	
1993	Lifeline to Victory	Ivy	Television film	
1994	Side Effects	Jane	Episode: "In Sickness and in Health"	
1994	While Justice Sleeps	Marlene Perkins	Television film	
1997	The Newsroom	Globe Reporter #3	Episode: "Unity"	
1997	Elvis Meets Nixon	Karen	Television film	
1998	Evidence of Blood	Luanne	Television film	
1998	Due South	Mert	Episode: "Mojo Rising"	
1999	Free Fall	Polly James	Television film	
2003	The Piano Man's Daughter	Elizabeth Frejus	Television film	
