= Seeing Things (TV series) =

- Genre: Mystery; Comedy; Fantasy; Drama
- Created by: David Barlow; Louis Del Grande
- Written by: David Barlow, Louis Del Grande, Anna Sandor & Bill Gough, Sheldon Chad, Bill Hartley & Bill Lynn, Larry Gaynor, David Cole, Jerome McCann
- Directed by: George McCowan
- Starring: Louis Del Grande; Janet-Laine Green; Martha Gibson
- Composer: Philip Schreibman
- Country of origin: Canada
- Original language: English
- No. of seasons: 6
- No. of episodes: 43

Production
- Executive producer: Robert Allen
- Producers: David Barlow; Louis Del Grande
- Production location: Toronto
- Cinematography: Nikos Evdemon
- Editor: Vincent Kent
- Running time: 1 hour
- Production company: CBC

Original release
- Network: CBC Television
- Release: 15 September 1981 – 15 May 1987

Seeing Things is a Canadian comedy-drama mystery television series with a fantasy twist, in that the lead character has postcognitive visions that help solve each episode's mystery. The series originally aired on CBC Television from 1981 to 1987. It was also seen in Europe, South Africa, Singapore, Spain, Australia and the United States. In all, 43 episodes were produced. With the exception of "Seeing R.E.D." (90 minutes) episodes were one hour long.

Series star Louis Del Grande (formerly an actor, writer, and co-producer of the hit sitcom The King of Kensington) was also the show's co-creator, with writer David Barlow. Del Grande and Barlow wrote the first three episodes, and thereafter oversaw the writing staff and produced all 43 episodes.

== Cast and premise ==
- Louis Del Grande stars as Louis Ciccone, a balding, overweight 40-ish newspaper journalist for the Toronto Gazette. Although the manic, motormouthed Louis is generally friendly, in pursuing his stories he's often pushy and self-centered, and is usually somewhat disorganized. However, Lou is tenacious and dedicated, and he also has limited postcognitive abilities, which help him to solve murders (and get the resultant headline scoops). Louis can only control his postcognitive abilities by investigating clues given to him in a vision ... only when he discovers new information will further visions occur, which provide increasingly more detail until they finally reveal the murderer. At the start of the series, Louis' frequently rocky personal life is at a definite ebb—he's recently separated from his wife, and is living in a storeroom above his parents' bakery. But as career-focused as Louis is, he's equally tenacious about getting back together with his semi-estranged wife and his pre-teen son, and he works hard to stay in their lives.
- Martha Gibson (Del Grande's real-life wife) co-stars as Ciccone's ex-wife Marge, who, even though she and Louie are separated, reluctantly continues to help him with his cases. Marge even drives Louie around town (Louie, like Del Grande in real life, was too hyper to get a driver's license), though she initially rejected Louie's desire to rekindle their relationship. Marge clearly still loves Lou, but is continually frustrated by Louie's focus on his job, which gives him an unpredictable schedule and takes him away from family life for long stretches. However, they finally became a couple again in the show's final season. Del Grande and Gibson were married, then divorced in real life; they had re-wed just before the series started.
- Janet-Laine Green plays assistant crown attorney Heather Redfern. A young, competent prosecuting attorney from an upper-class background, Redfern is one of the very few people who know about Louie's postcognitive abilities, which often relate to cases she's working on. Though she generally respects Louie's visions, she's often exasperated by their vague or inconclusive nature. She's even more frustrated by Louie's tendency to, unannounced and uninvited, interrupt Redfern directly in the middle of client meetings, trials, social events, dates, or even in the middle of the night, to share his latest visions and/or theories with her. Louie's frequent meetings with the gorgeous young lawyer also contribute to feelings of jealousy in Marge, although Louie and Redfern are never more than close working colleagues. In fact, Louie invariably refers to her as "Redfern", and Redfern always addresses Louie as "Mr. Ciccone".

=== Other Ciccone family members ===
- Al Bernardo plays Alberto Ciccone, Louis' father. Generally cheerful, he encourages Louis to get back together with Marge. He runs a small local bakery, with his wife.
- Lynne Gordon plays Anna Ciccone, Louis' mother. She tends to be a little less forgiving of Louis' foibles, and is definitely embarrassed by him having to move back in with his parents in his late thirties.
- Ivan Beaulieu as Jason Ciccone, the son of Louis and Marge. A pre-teen at the series' start, Jason is an upbeat, fairly well-adjusted kid, despite his odd family circumstances. He lives with Marge, but sees Louie quite frequently.

=== Louie's workmates ===
- Murray Westgate plays Max Perkins, Louie's demanding, impatient editor at the Gazette.
- Louis Negin plays Marlon Bede, the Gazette's food writer. Louie often mooches meals that Marlon's preparing (or creating recipes for) in his specially-built on-site Test Kitchen.

=== Other regulars ===
- Ratch Wallace as Kenny Volker, Redfern's most frequent dating partner through the series. Volker, a professional hockey player for the Toronto Maple Leafs, is tall, muscular, wealthy and generally polite ... although on the ice, he's paid to be a no-holds-barred goon.
- Cec Linder as Crown Attorney Robert T. Spenser, Redfern's boss. Much more conservative than Redfern, Spenser is very concerned with appearances, and maintaining his office's aura of respectability. Spenser has little use for Louie Ciccone, who he believes is certifiably crazy—and almost no tolerance for Redfern's continued association with him.
- Frank Adamson as Sergeant John Brown, the Toronto homicide detective most often assigned to the cases Louis has an interest in. He has a mostly antagonistic relationship with Louis, but will begrudgingly admit that Ciccone has given him some good information that has led to the right arrests.
- John Fox as Officer Falstaff, Brown's clumsy-but-good-natured usual partner.

Seeing Things was a hit, and guest-starred several celebrities, such as Ronnie Hawkins, Bruno Gerussi, Gordon Pinsent and Karen Kain. Another notable appearance is by Mark McKinney of The Kids in the Hall, who played a character working in a morgue in the episode "Another Point of View".

== Reception ==
The show won several awards. In 1983, Del Grande won an ACTRA Award for Best Actor in a Television Drama, and Sheldon Chad won an ACTRA award for Best Writer Television Drama for the episode "Seeing Double".

In Canada, it aired on CBC, typically drawing 1.1 million viewers. In the United States, it was broadcast by PBS.

At the time it first aired, it was the "most successful home-grown program in Canada".

== Episodes ==
=== Series overview ===
Series	Episodes	Originally released	
Series	Episodes	First released	Last released
1	3	15 September 1981	29 September 1981
2	8	20 October 1982	8 December 1982
3	8	15 January 1984	4 March 1984
4	8	3 February 1985	24 March 1985
5	8	26 January 1986	16 March 1986
6	8	24 February 1987	15 May 1987

=== Season 1 (1981) ===
Season 1 episodes aired on Tuesday nights at 9.

No. overall	No. in series	Title	Written by	Original release date
1	1	"I May Be Seeing Things, But I'm Not Crazy"	Louis Del Grande & David Barlow	15 September 1981
Court reporter Louis Ciccone accidentally wanders into the wrong courtroom, and has a psychic vision that a homeless defendant convicted of murder is in fact innocent.
2	2	"Sight Unseen"	Louis Del Grande & David Barlow	22 September 1981
Lou investigates a murder in Toronto's art scene.
3	3	"A Charming Sight"	Louis Del Grande & David Barlow	29 September 1981
Marge gets a job as a script assistant on a popular sitcom, where the boorish, racist star (Billy Van) is receiving death threats -- and Lou is on hand when a murder occurs.

=== Season 2 (1982) ===
Season 2 moved to Wednesday nights at 9.

No. overall	No. in series	Title	Written by	Original release date
4	1	"An Eye for an Eye"	Sheldon Chad	20 October 1982
Lou investigates what appears to be a racially motivated hate crime perpetrated by a modern-day Nazi -- but then his visions start to reveal a much deeper story.
5	2	"Looking Back"	Anna Sandor & Bill Gough	27 October 1982
Lou has to defend himself from a murder rap, after a bitter long-time rival (August Schellenberg) turns up dead at their high school reunion.
6	3	"Seeing Double"	Sheldon Chad	3 November 1982
Shortly after Marge is given a vase by a mysterious woman in Toronto's Chinatown, an attempt is made on her life -- and Lou has to figure out what's really going on.
7	4	"Through the Looking Glass"	Anna Sandor & Bill Gough	10 November 1982
Lou's visions convince him that the "accidental" death of a hockey player during a game was actually no accident. With Sean McCann and Jack Duffy.
8	5	"Eyes Too Big for His Stomach"	Jon Ruddy	17 November 1982
Lou joins forces with the Gazette's food editor Marlon to investigate a murder in the world of high-class restaurateurs. With Marvin Goldhar and George Buza.
9	6	"Evil Eye"	Charles Micallef	24 November 1982
A friend of Lou's is charged with murdering the wealthy father of his fiancee.
10	7	"Hear No Evil, See No Evil"	Anna Sandor & Bill Gough	1 December 1982
When a pop singer is electrocuted during a performance, Lou tries to clear a member of his backing band (Dianne Heatherington) of the murder.
11	8	"In the Eyes of the Law"	Sheldon Chad	8 December 1982
Lou tries to protect Redfern from a drug dealer threatening her life -- and who has already killed a friend of hers.

=== Season 3 (1984) ===
Season 3 episodes aired Sunday nights at 8.

No. overall	No. in series	Title	Written by	Original release date
12	1	"Seeing R.E.D."	Sheldon Chad	15 January 1984
When Kenny Volker is accused of murder, Lou grows increasingly frustrated as he can't seem to find evidence of his innocence. With Rita Tushingham. (90-minute episode.)
13	2	"Someone Is Watching"	Anna Sandor & Bill Gough	22 January 1984
Redfern buys an old house, which for Lou triggers a number of unpleasant visions of a long-past crime. With Kate Reid, Henry Beckman and Shawn Thompson.
14	3	"I'm Looking Through You"	Larry Gaynor	29 January 1984
After a protest bombing, Lou has a series of visions of Marge in her 1960s hippie days. With Don Francks.
15	4	"Now You See Him, Now You Don't"	Sheldon Chad	5 February 1984
Redfern is the only witness to -- and a prime suspect in -- the brutal murder of an entrepreneur. With Gordon Pinsent.
16	5	"Snow Blind"	Anna Sandor & Bill Gough	12 February 1984
Lou's latest attempt to reconcile with Marge -- this time on a snow lodge retreat -- is ruined when a chandelier falls and kills another guest, and Lou's visions force him to investigate. With Barbara Hamilton and Booth Savage (husband of series regular Janet-Laine Green).
17	6	"An Eye on the Future"	Sheldon Chad	19 February 1984
Marge likes her new job at a retirement home, but Louie's visions soon make things complicated. With Saul Rubinek and Kate Lynch.
18	7	"Second Sight"	Larry Gaynor	26 February 1984
Lou encounters a performing psychic who calls himself The Great Eli (Barry Morse), and investigates when Eli apparently wills a heckler to simply drop dead. With Bruno Gerussi.
19	8	"Looking Good"	Anna Sandor & Bill Gough	4 March 1984
Lou offers to help investigate when Sergeant Brown's daughter is accused of murdering a fellow beauty pageant contestant.

=== Season 4 (1985) ===
Season 4 episodes aired Sunday nights at 8.

No. overall	No. in series	Title	Written by	Original release date
20	1	"Fortune and Ladies' Eyes"	Larry Gaynor	3 February 1985
Lou embarks on a dangerous search for a murderer whose next target appears to be the imprisoned Marge. With Gerard Parkes.
21	2	"Seeing the Country"	Larry Gaynor	10 February 1985
Lou and Marge take a trip to the country, only to discover their idyllic-seeming retreat harbours some long-buried and deadly secrets. With Kay Hawtrey and Richard Donat.
22	3	"You Can't Believe Your Eyes"	Anna Sandor & Bill Gough	17 February 1985
Lou and Marge work together to unravel the mystery of the death of a politician. With Fiona Reid.
23	4	"Defective Vision"	Bill Hartley & Bill Lynn	24 February 1985
Lou investigates the death of a Soviet spy during a ballet performance, and finds himself in hot water with the RCMP, the CIA and the KGB. With Ross Petty, Karen Kain, Maury Chaykin, and Dan Redican.
24	5	"Eye in the Sky: Part 1"	David Cole	3 March 1985
Working as a TV reporter, Lou investigates a murder that leads to the discovery of illegal disposal of nuclear waste. With John Ireland and Kathleen Laskey.
25	6	"Eye in the Sky: Part 2"	David Cole	10 March 1985
Lou tries to determine who is behind the nuclear waste cover-up, and why. With John Ireland.
26	7	"I'll Be Seeing You"	Anna Sandor & Bill Gough	17 March 1985
Two members of a local Italian social club are murdered -- and Alberto is a prime suspect.
27	8	"Blind Alley"	David Cole	24 March 1985
Lou goes undercover as an explosives expert when he aids the police in an investigation of an international theft ring. With Don Francks.

=== Season 5 (1986) ===
Season 5 episodes aired Sunday nights at 8.

No. overall	No. in series	Title	Written by	Original release date
28	1	"The Walls Have Eyes"	Jerome McCann & Michael Williams	26 January 1986
Lou and Marge attend a weekend mystery LARP -- and find that someone has replaced the blanks with real bullets. With Kenneth Welsh.
29	2	"The Night Has a Thousand Eyes"	David Cole	2 February 1986
An elderly eccentric, wanted in connection with an explosion, keeps eluding the police and showing up on Lou's doorstep. With Robin Ward and Kay Hawtrey.
30	3	"If Looks Could Kill"	David Cole	9 February 1986
An accused murderer kidnaps Redfern, holding her hostage until Lou and Marge can prove he is innocent. With Booth Savage and Belinda Metz.
31	4	"The Eyes of Ra"	Bill Hartley & Bill Lynn	16 February 1986
A modern killing seems to parallel Lou's visions of an Egyptian murder that occurred 3,000 years ago. With Austin Willis and Hrant Alianak.
32	5	"I'm Dancing with Stars in My Eyes"	Anna Sandor & Bill Gough	23 February 1986
Lou's visions have him convinced that Marge's new dancing partner is a serial killer. With Ross Petty.
33	6	"Optical Illusion"	Larry Gaynor	2 March 1986
Jason gets a summer job at a carnival, but Lou's visions reveal the carnival has a dark side. With Maury Chaykin and Dinah Christie. Writer Larry Gaynor has a small role as "Sonny".
34	7	"Look at Me, Look at Me"	Don Truckey	9 March 1986
Lou writes a series of articles chronicling the adventures of a cheerful stuntman and practical joker -- but then one of the stunts appears to kill an innocent bystander.
35	8	"That Hang Dog Look"	Larry Gaynor	16 March 1986
A stray dog Lou encounters seems to be the key to solving a murder. With Barbara Hamilton and Tony Rosato.

=== Season 6 (1987) ===
The final season moves to Tuesday nights at 9. The final episode, broadcast five weeks after the rest of the series, aired on a Friday.

No. overall	No. in series	Title	Written by	Original release date
36	1	"Here's Looking at You"	Jerome McCann	24 February 1987
Lou agrees to switch places with a monarch he resembles, and soon gets embroiled in a murder. Louis Del Grande also appears as "King Stefan".
37	2	"Eye of the Beholder"	George Allan	3 March 1987
Lou meets a beautiful model, who he believes is in danger from her designer husband. With Cynthia Dale and Lawrence Dane.
38	3	"Spectacle of India"	Bill Lynn & Bill Hartley	10 March 1987
Strictly for fun, Lou, Marge and Redfern get involved with an amateur theatre company ... then the director gets murdered.
39	4	"Another Point of View"	Larry Gaynor	17 March 1987
Lou goes undercover to write about Toronto's homeless community, and discovers a corpse on a park bench.
40	5	"The Naked Eye"	David Cole	24 March 1987
When a Brazilian native is accidentally smuggled into Canada, Lou and Redfern try to track him down, and in the process uncover an illegal real estate scheme.
41	6	"Bull's-Eye"	Bill Lynn & Bill Hartley	31 March 1987
Lou and Marge visit a dude ranch owned by Marge's uncle (Ronnie Hawkins), and where murder rears its head. With Belinda Metz, Richard Donat, Harvey Atkin and Wayne Robson.
42	7	"Gifted Pupils"	Jerome McCann	7 April 1987
Lou investigates a murder of a former headmistress at an exclusive private school.
43	8	"A Vision in White"	David Cole	15 May 1987
Redfern announces she'll be marrying a man she met just a few weeks ago. Lou has visions related to Redfern's fiance that make him uneasy, but Marge is convinced that Lou is desperate to break up Redfern's marriage because he is in love with her himself.: At the very end of the episode, after the final credits have rolled, a short message appears: "Thank You and Goodbye."
