= 1986 Dora Mavor Moore Awards =

The 1986 Dora Mavor Moore Awards celebrated excellence in theatre from the Toronto Alliance for the Performing Arts.

== Winners and nominees ==
=== General Theatre Division ===
Production	Original Play
Spring Awakening – CentreStage; Farther West – Tarragon Theatre; Ghetto – Toronto Workshop Productions; Hosanna – Théâtre du Petit Bonheur; The Miracle Worker – Young People's Theatre	Jessica by Maria Campbell and Linda Griffiths; Islands by Margaret Hollingsworth – New Play Centre; La Storia: A Table of Fables by Maristella Roca – Acting Company; Papers by Allan Stratton – Tarragon Theatre; The Wedding Script by Don Hannah – Tarragon Theatre
Leading Actor	Leading Actress
Stephen Ouimette for Danny and the Deep Blue Sea – Eran Productions; Eric Peterson for The Double Bass – Theatre Passe Muraille; R. H. Thomson for Hamlet – Toronto Free Theatre; Brian Torpe for As Is – Toronto Free Theatre and Shaw Festival; Jean-Guy Viau for Hosanna – Théâtre du Petit Bonheur	Martha Burns for The Miracle Worker – Young People's Theatre; Nancy Beatty for The Wedding Script – Tarragon Theatre; Nora McLellan for Farther West – Tarragon Theatre; Patricia Phillips for And a Nightingale Sang – East Side Players; Joanna Schellenberg for The Miracle Worker – Young People's Theatre
Supporting Actor	Supporting Actress
Roland Hewgill for A Moon for the Misbegotten – Tarragon Theatre; Sean McCann for Blue City Slammers – VTR Productions; Avery Saltzman for The Treehouse at the Edge of the World – Young People's Theatre; Mark Saunders for The Wedding Script – Tarragon Theatre; Keith Thomas for Ghetto – Toronto Workshop Productions	Frances Hyland for The Heiress; Anne Anglin for Blue City Slammers – VTR Productions; Helen Hughes for Islands – New Play Centre; Diana Leblanc for Farther West – Tarragon Theatre; Mary Ellen Mahoney for The Wedding Script – Tarragon Theatre
Direction	Scenic Design
Richard Greenblatt for The Miracle Worker – Young People's Theatre; Alexander Hausvater for Ghetto – Toronto Workshop Productions; Ken Livingstone for Other Places – Tarragon Theatre; Andy McKim for The Wedding Script – Tarragon Theatre; John Van Burek for Hosanna – Théâtre du Petit Bonheur	Michael Levine for Spring Awakening – CentreStage; Reginald Bronskill for Ghetto – Toronto Workshop Productions; John Ferguson for The Treehouse at the Edge of the World – Young People's Theatre; Adam Kolodziej for Hamlet – Toronto Free Theatre; Cameron Porteous for Farther West – Tarragon Theatre
Costume Design	Lighting Design
Michael Levine for Spring Awakening – CentreStage; Shawn Kerwin for The Miracle Worker – Young People's Theatre; Sue LePage for The Wedding Script – Tarragon Theatre; Cameron Porteous for Farther West – Tarragon Theatre; Shadowland for The History of the Village of the Small Huts: The British – VideoCabaret and Theatre Passe Muraille	Robert Thomson for Spring Awakening – CentreStage; Louise Guinand for A Moon for the Misbegotten – Tarragon Theatre; Kevin Fraser for Farther West – Tarragon Theatre; Jim Plaxton for The Treehouse at the Edge of the World – Young People's Theatre; Steven Hawkins for The Miracle Worker – Young People's Theatre
Choreography
Christopher House for Green Evening, Clear and Warm – Toronto Dance Theatre; Conrad Alexandrowicz for Auto-da-Fé – Dancemakers; Bill James for Atlas Moves Watching

=== Musical Theatre or Revue Division ===
Production	Original Musical
The Desert Song – Desert Song Productions; Evita – Limelight Dinner Theatre; The Secret Garden – COMUS Music Theatre	The Secret Garden by Joan MacLeod and Stephen McNeff – COMUS Music Theatre; Bordering on Madness, or Who's Tory Now – Second City; The Moose That Roared by Jim Betts – Young People's Theatre
Actor	Actress
Victor A. Young for The Desert Song – Desert Song Productions; Steven Bush for Bad Apples – Mixed Company Theatre; David Switzer for Half Past the Eighties – FASS Theatre Company	Allison Grant for The Secret Garden – COMUS Music Theatre; Linda Kash for Bordering on Madness, or Who's Tory Now – Second City; Camilla Scott for Evita – Limelight Dinner Theatre
Direction	Scenic Design
Christopher Newton for The Desert Song – Desert Song Productions; Edward Love for A... My Name Is Alice – Schwarz/Sewell Productions; Kelly Robinson for The Secret Garden – COMUS Music Theatre	Mary Kerr for The Desert Song – Desert Song Productions; Michael Cooper, Robin Muller and Jim Plaxton for The Thunder, Perfect Mind – Toronto Free Theatre; Leslie Macauley for The Secret Garden – COMUS Music Theatre
Costume Design	Lighting Design
Mary Kerr for The Desert Song – Desert Song Productions; Leslie Macauley for The Secret Garden – COMUS Music Theatre; David Gibb for Evita – Limelight Dinner Theatre	Jeffrey Dallas for The Desert Song – Desert Song Productions; Ben Cekuta for Evita – Limelight Dinner Theatre; Stephen Ross for The Secret Garden – COMUS Music Theatre
Musical Direction	Choreography
Chris Donison and Roger Perkins for The Desert Song – Desert Song Productions; Don Horsburugh and David Warrack for Evita – Limelight Dinner Theatre; Brahm Goldhamer for The Secret Garden – COMUS Music Theatre	Diane Nyland for Nunsense – Nunsense of Canada; Bob Ainslie for The Desert Song – Desert Song Productions; Brian Foley for Evita – Limelight Dinner Theatre

=== Independent Theatre Division ===
Production
- Cabaret – VideoCabaret
- Melancholia – Theatre Columbus and Vox Pop
- Touch – David Demchuk and Buddies in Bad Times

=== Theatre for Young Audiences Division ===
Production
- Getting Wrecked – Theatre Direct
  - Skin – Young People's Theatre
  - The General – Theatre Direct

== See also ==
- 40th Tony Awards
- 1986 Laurence Olivier Awards
