= 1985 Dora Mavor Moore Awards =

The 1985 Dora Mavor Moore Awards celebrated excellence in theatre from the Toronto Alliance for the Performing Arts.

== Winners and nominees ==
=== General Theatre Division ===
Production	Original Play
Cyrano de Bergerac – Shaw Festival; Albertine in Five Times – Théâtre du Petit Bonheur; Criminals in Love – Factory Theatre; Cyrano de Bergerac – Shaw Festival; The History of the Village of the Small Huts: New France – VideoCabaret and Theatre Passe Muraille; Uncle Vanya – Tarragon Theatre	Salt-Water Moon by David French – Tarragon Theatre; De Beaux Gestes et Beautiful Deeds by Marie-Lynn Hammond – Théâtre Français de Toronto and Brave New Works; Criminals in Love by George F. Walker – Factory Theatre; The History of the Village of the Small Huts: New France by Michael Hollingsworth – VideoCabaret and Theatre Passe Muraille; Prague by John Krizanc – Tarragon Theatre
Leading Actor	Leading Actress
Heath Lamberts for Cyrano de Bergerac – Shaw Festival; Peter Blais for Criminals in Love – Factory Theatre; Paul Gross for Romeo and Juliet – Toronto Free Theatre; David Hemblen for Uncle Vanya – Tarragon Theatre; Errol Slue for Master Harold and the Boys	Doris Petrie for 'night, Mother – Tarragon Theatre; Thuli Dumakude for Poppie Nongena; Nora McLellan for Uncle Vanya – Tarragon Theatre; Louise Philippe for De Beaux Gestes et Beautiful Deeds – Théâtre Français de Toronto and Brave New Works; Jennifer Phipps for L'Amante Anglaise – Théâtre Français de Toronto
Supporting Actor	Supporting Actress
Richard McMillan for Prague – Tarragon Theatre; Edward Atienza for Separate Tables – Young People's Theatre; Richard Curnock for Quartermaine's Terms – Royal Alexander Theatre; Bernard Hopkins for Tonight at 8:30 – CentreStage; Michael Riley for This Side of the Rockies – Toronto Free Theatre	Susan Wright for New World – Tarragon Theatre; Clare Coulter for Doc – Theatre Passe Muraille; Barbara Gordon for Criminals in Love – Factory Theatre; Doris Petrie for Albertine in Five Times – Théâtre du Petit Bonheur; Brigit Wilson for Come Back to the Five and Dime, Jimmy Dean, Jimmy Dean – Factory Theatre
Direction	Scenic Design
Derek Goldby for Uncle Vanya – Tarragon Theatre; Bill Glassco for Salt-Water Moon – Tarragon Theatre; Ken Livingstone for 'night, Mother – Tarragon Theatre; Robin Phillips for New World – Tarragon Theatre; Aaron Schwartz for Come Back to the Five and Dime, Jimmy Dean, Jimmy Dean – Factory Theatre	John Ferguson for This Side of the Rockies – Toronto Free Theatre; Michael Eagan for Albertine in Five Times – Théâtre du Petit Bonheur; John Ferguson for This Side of the Rockies – Toronto Free Theatre; Sue LePage for Salt-Water Moon – Tarragon Theatre; Ken Livingstone for Endgame; Jules Tonus for When the Wind Blows
Costume Design	Lighting Design
Cameron Porteous for Cyrano de Bergerac – Shaw Festival; Bobbe Besold and Shadowland Theatre for The History of the Village of the Small Huts: New France – VideoCabaret and Theatre Passe Muraille; Daphne Dare and Robin Phillips for New World – Tarragon Theatre; Michael Eagan for The Mystery of Irma Vep; John Pennoyer for The Miser – Théâtre Français de Toronto	Robert Thomson for Cyrano de Bergerac – Shaw Festival; Louise Guinand for The Last Voyage of the Devil's Wheel – Young People's Theatre; Henry Jaeger for Endgame; Jim Plaxton for The History of the Village of the Small Huts: New France – VideoCabaret and Theatre Passe Muraille; Jim Plaxton for This Side of the Rockies – Toronto Free Theatre

=== Musical Theatre or Revue Division ===
Production	Original Musical
Cats – MTE Productions; A Chorus Line – Limelight Dinner Theatre; Little Shop of Horrors – Little Shop Company	On Tap by Lesley Ballantyne, Jeff Hyslop and Scott Smith – Young People's Theatre; American Demon by Allen Booth and Jan Kudelka – Theatre Passe Muraille; Off Off Bay Street by Theresa Sears, Paul Shilton and David Switzer – Second City
Actor	Actress
Kimble Hall for The Count of Monte Cristo – Toronto Workshop Productions; Paul Dorsey for A Chorus Line – Limelight Dinner Theatre; Richardo Keens-Douglas for The Obeah Man – Black Theatre Workshop	Sheila McCarthy for Little Shop of Horrors – Little Shop Company; Sally Cahill for Once More with Fooling – Second City; Monique Leyrac for 1900 – VideoCabaret
Direction	Scenic Design
David Taylor for Cats – MTE Productions; Lewis Baumander and Patrick Christopher for The Count of Monte Cristo – Toronto Workshop Productions; Constance Grappo and Joel Greenberg for Little Shop of Horrors – Little Shop Company	John Napier for Cats – MTE Productions; Edward T. Gianfrancesco for Little Shop of Horrors – Little Shop Company; Sue LePage for The Count of Monte Cristo – Toronto Workshop Productions
Costume Design	Lighting Design
John Napier for Cats – MTE Productions; Sally Lesser for Little Shop of Horrors – Little Shop Company; Martha Mann for The Count of Monte Cristo – Toronto Workshop Productions	David Hersey for Cats – MTE Productions; Louise Guinand and Robert Thomson for Little Shop of Horrors – Little Shop Company; Graeme S. Thomson for The Count of Monte Cristo – Toronto Workshop Productions
Musical Direction	Choreography
Stanley Lebowsky for Cats – MTE Productions; David Warrack for A Chorus Line – Limelight Dinner Theatre; Stephen Woodjetts for On Tap – Young People's Theatre	T. Michael Reed for Cats – MTE Productions; Brian Foley for A Chorus Line – Limelight Dinner Theatre; Lesley Ballantyne, Jeff Hyslop and Scott Smith for On Tap – Young People's Theatre

=== Independent Theatre Division ===
Production
- Dali – Buddies in Bad Times and Crow’s Theatre Circus
  - Electrical Wires and Other Family Problems – Theatre Columbus
  - Façade – Theatrebond
  - La Storia – Acting Company
  - Ubu Roi – 45.3

=== Theatre for Young Audiences Division ===
Production
- Love and Work Enough – Nightwood Theatre and Theatre Direct Canada
  - Little Victories – Young People's Theatre
  - Separate Doors – Young People's Theatre

== See also ==
- 39th Tony Awards
- 1985 Laurence Olivier Awards
