= 1981 Dora Mavor Moore Awards =

The 1981 Dora Mavor Moore Awards celebrated excellence in theatre from the Toronto Alliance for the Performing Arts.

== Winners and nominees ==
=== General Theatre Division ===
Production	Original Play
Theatre of the Film Noir – Factory Theatre Lab; Arms and the Man – Douglas Beattie and Toronto Truck Theatre; Loose Ends – Tarragon Theatre; The Last Meeting of the Knights of the White Magnolia – Theatre Plus	Rexy by Allan Stratton – Phoenix Theatre; ECU by Neil Munro – Toronto Free Theatre; The Crackwalker by Judith Thompson – Theatre Passe Muraille; Theatre of the Film Noir by George F. Walker – Factory Theatre Lab
Leading Actor	Leading Actress
Brent Carver for Bent – Schwarz/Sewell Productions; Donald Davis for ECU – Toronto Free Theatre; Donald Davis for On Golden Pond – Theatre Plus; Hardee T. Lineham for The Crackwalker – Theatre Passe Muraille	Roberta Maxwell for Stevie – Young People's Theatre; Michelle Fisk for Loose Ends – Tarragon Theatre; Lynne Griffin for Arms and the Man – Douglas Beattie and Toronto Truck Theatre; Joann McIntyre for The Crackwalker – Theatre Passe Muraille
Supporting Actor	Supporting Actress
Ed McNamara for Generations; Stewart Arnott for ECU – Toronto Free Theatre; Robert Haley for Arms and the Man – Douglas Beattie and Toronto Truck Theatre; Patrick Sinclair for The Team	Kate Reid for Stevie – Young People's Theatre; Robin Craig for Loose Ends – Tarragon Theatre; Nicky Guadagni for Plenty – CentreStage Theatre; Mary Savidge for Dracula – Young People's Theatre
Direction	Scenic Design
George F. Walker for Theatre of the Film Noir – Factory Theatre Lab; William Lane for Loose Ends – Tarragon Theatre; Alan Scarfe for The Last Meeting of the Knights of the White Magnolia – Theatre Plus; Ray Whelan for Arms and the Man – Douglas Beattie and Toronto Truck Theatre	Jim Plaxton for Loose Ends – Tarragon Theatre; John Ferguson for Plenty – CentreStage Theatre; Astrid Janson for Christopher Columbus – Toronto Workshop Productions; Allan Stichbury for The Last Meeting of the Knights of the White Magnolia – Theatre Plus
Costume Design	Lighting Design
Susan Benson for A Funny Thing Happened on the Way to the Forum – Toronto Arts Productions; Olga Dimitrov for The Boy Friend – Errant Productions; Juul Haalmeyer for Valentine Brown – Valentine Productions with Toronto Workshop Productions	Jim Plaxton for Theatre of the Film Noir – Factory Theatre Lab; Sholem Dolgoy for Rexy – Phoenix Theatre; Jim Plaxton for Loose Ends – Tarragon Theatre; Robert Thomson for Happy End – Tarragon Theatre

=== Musical Theatre or Revue Division ===
Production (Musical)	Production (Revue or Cabaret)
The Boy Friend – Errant Productions; A Funny Thing Happened on the Way to the Forum – Toronto Arts Productions; Happy End – Tarragon Theatre; The Boy Friend – Errant Productions; Valentine Brown – Valentine Productions with Toronto Workshop Productions	Toronto, Toronto – Warrack Productions; Judy – Pop Productions with David Paquet; Two Minutes for High-Schticking – Second City; We Got Love – Warrack Productions with Tetrad Group
Actor	Actress
Heath Lamberts for A Funny Thing Happened on the Way to the Forum – Toronto Arts Productions; Brian McKay for The Boy Friend – Errant Productions; Rudy Webb for We Got Love – Warrack Productions with Tetrad Group; Elias Zarou for Toronto, Toronto – Warrack Productions	Susan Cox for Valentine Brown – Valentine Productions with Toronto Workshop Productions; Denise Ferguson for The Boy Friend – Errant Productions; Jodi Glassman for Toronto, Toronto – Warrack Productions; Liliane Stilwell for We Got Love – Warrack Productions with Tetrad Group
Original Score
John Roby for Theatre of the Film Noir – Factory Theatre Lab; Susan Cox for Valentine Brown – Valentine Productions with Toronto Workshop Productions; Mark Shekter and Charles Weir for Toronto, Toronto – Warrack Productions; David E. Walden for Oh! My Stars

== See also ==
- 35th Tony Awards
- 1981 Laurence Olivier Awards
