= Barclay Hope =

Canadian actor (born 1958)

- Born: February 25, 1958 (age 68); Montreal, Quebec, Canada
- Occupation: Actor
- Years active: 1983–present
- Spouse: Lindsay Collins (1988–present)

Barclay Hope (born February 25, 1958) is a Canadian actor. He is perhaps best known for his roles as Clifford and Claudius Blossom on Riverdale, Mike Hayden on Street Legal, Peter Axon on PSI Factor, Col. Lionel Pendergast on Stargate SG-1, and Gen. Mansfield on Eureka.

== Life and career ==
Hope was born in 1958 in Montreal, Quebec, Canada. He is the younger brother of the actor William Hope. Hope appeared in the TV series Psi Factor: Chronicles of the Paranormal (1996–2000) as Peter Axon. His screen credits include The Wager (1998) directed by Aaron Woodley which also starred Peter Blais and Valerie Boyle and Paycheck (2003) directed by John Woo. He also had recurring roles as Colonel Lionel Pendergast on Stargate SG-1 and as General Mansfield on Eureka.

Hope is married to fellow actress Lindsay Collins and they have 3 children - Sally, Maggie and Charlie.

== Filmography ==
=== Film ===
Year	Title	Role	Notes
1987	Rolling Vengeance	Steve Tyler	
1998	The Garbage Picking Field Goal Kicking Philadelphia Phenomenon	Mitchell	
1989	The Long Road Home	Barry Berger	
2000	Cruel Intentions 2	Mr. Felder	Direct to video
2003	Paycheck	Suit	
2004	The Truth About Miranda	Vince	
2005	Fetching Cody	Mr. Wesson	
2008	On the Other Hand, Death	Carl Deems	
2008	Toxic Skies	CEO Dick Taylor	
2010	Tooth Fairy	Coach	
2011	Final Destination 5	Dr. Leonetti	
2013	The Wedding Chapel	Larry	
2013	Assault on Wall Street	Ian Marwood	
2014	Big Eyes	Gannett Lawyer	
2015	The Age of Adaline	Financial Advisor	
2019	A Cinderella Story: Christmas Wish	Terence Wintergarden	Direct to video

=== Television ===
Year	Film	Role	Notes
1983–1984	Hangin' In	Scott / Kent / Monty	3 episodes
1986	The High Price of Passion	Officer #1	Television film
1986	The Last Season	Tom Powers	Television film
1987–1990	Friday the 13th: The Series	Lloyd / Steve Wells	2 episodes (as Lloyd); Episode: "Epitaph for a Lonely Soul" (as Steve Wells)
1987	Night Heat	John Tiller	Episode "Punk"
1988	Rin Tin Tin: K-9 Cop		Episode: "Murder She Sang"
1988–1989	Ramona	Uncle Hobart	3 episodes
1988–1989	Alfred Hitchcock Presents	Harvey / Oliver Craig	2 episodes
1989	Knightwatch	Roy	Episode: "Lost Weekend"
1989	The Twilight Zone	Gerry Cross	Episode: "The Cold Equations"
1990	War of the Worlds	M.P.	Episode: "Max"
1990	Deadly Nightmares	Ken Wilder	Episode: "New Dawn"
1991	The Hidden Room		Episode: "Spirit Cabinet"
1992	Counterstrike	Unknown	Episode: "The Three Tramps"
1991–1992	Top Cops	Brian McMullin / Gary Mitrovich	2 episodes
1992	Forever Knight	Roger Jameson	Episode: "Only the Lonely"
1992–1993	Secret Service	Mack / Breen	2 episodes
1990–1993	E.N.G.	Simon Kent / Jim Baldwin / Pisaro	2 episodes
1993	Gross Misconduct: The Life of Brian Spencer	Greg Polis	Television film
1993	Matrix	Harry Thacker	Episode: "To Err Is Human"
1993–1994	Ready or Not	Coach	2 episodes
1993–1994	Street Legal	Mike Hayden	6 episodes
1994	To Save the Children	Tom Little	Television film
1994	The Mighty Jungle	Brad	Episode: "Oh, Brother"
1994	Spenser: The Judas Goat	Flanders	Television film
1995	Kung Fu: The Legend Continues	Larry	Episode: "May I Walk with You"
1995	Goosebumps	Mr. Hawkins	Episode: "Piano Lessons Can Be Murder"
1996	Remembrance	Dr. Beech	Television film
1996–2000	PSI Factor: Chronicles of the Paranormal	Peter Axon	85 episodes
1997	Dead Silence	Sheriff Gene Stillwell	Television film
1998	The Wager	Richard	Short
1998	The Wonderful World of Disney	Mitchell	1 episode
1999	Strange Justice	Tom Daniels	Television film
2000	Bed and Breakfast	Father / Lizard	Short
2000	Range of Motion	Jay Berman	Television film
2001	Inside the Osmonds	Jack Regas	Television film
2001	Dangerous Child	Frank	Television film
2001	The Facts of Life Reunion	Robert James	Television film
2001	'Twas the Night	John Wrigley	Television film
2002	Doc		Episode: "Fearless"
2002	You Belong to Me	Aidan Masters	Television film
2003	Soldier's Girl	Sergeant Howard Paxton	Television film
2003	Lucky 7	Partner	Television film
2003	Word of Honor	Brad Sadowski	Television film
2003	Battlestar Galactica	Transport Pilot	2 episodes
2003	The Death and Life of Nancy Eaton	Jim	Television film
2003–2007	Smallville	Doctor	3 episodes
2004	The Collector	Carter Baines	Episode: "The Prosecutor"
2004	A Very Cool Christmas	Stan Dearborn	Television film
2004–2005	The L Word	Bert Gruber	3 episodes
2004–2006	Stargate SG-1	Colonel Lionel Pendergast	6 episodes
2005	Best Friends	Kurt	Television film
2005	Cold Squad	Evan Moss	2 episodes
2006	The Stranger Game	Paul Otis	Television film
2006	Trophy Wife	Duke Fairbanks	Television film
2006	The Path to 9/11	John Miller	2 episodes
2006	Holiday Wishes	Jack King	Television film
2007, 2015	Supernatural	Russell Wellington / Professor Arthur Cox	Episode: "Tall Tales", "There's no Place Like Home"
2007	Unthinkable	Dan Bell	Television film
2007	Traveler	Joseph	3 episodes
2007	Whistler	Mr. Griffin	Episode: "Family Ties"
2007–2010	Eureka	General Mansfield	8 episodes
2008	Charlie & Me	Dr. Robert Graham	Television film
2008	The Boy Next Door	Edward	Television film
2009	Storm Seekers	Henry Gersh	Television film
2009	Defying Gravity	Candy Exec	Episode: "Fear"
2009	Fringe	Andrew Burgess	Episode: "Fracture"
2010	At Risk	Jessie Huber	Television film
2010–2011	Hellcats	Parker Monroe	4 episodes
2011	Fairly Legal	Joe Riley	Episode: "Benched"
2011	Sanctuary	Security force commander	Episode: "Carentan"
2011–2012	The Killing	Michael Ames	6 episodes
2012	Wrath of Grapes: The Don Cherry Story II		Television mini-series Episode: "Night 2"
2012	The Listener	Thomas Vallance	Episode: "Poisoned Minds"
2012	The Christmas Consultant	Jack Fletcher	Television film
2013	Emily Owens M.D.	Frank	Episode: "Emily and... The Social Experiment"
2013	The Haunting Hour: The Series	Dad	Episode: "Checking Out"
2013	After All These Years	Michael	Television film
2013	Cedar Cove	Senator Pete Raymond	Episode: "Pilot"
2014	June in January	Charlie Fraser	Television film
2014	Witches of East End	William Hutton	Episode: "Art of Darkness"
2014, 2015	Once Upon a Time	Man / Lily's Father	2 episodes
2015	Girlfriends' Guide to Divorce	Artie	Episode: "Rule #92: Don't Do the Crime If You Can't Do the Time"
2015	iZombie	Mr. Sparrow	Episode: "Maternity Liv"
2015	One Crazy Cruise	Mr. Bragg	Television film
2015	Wayward Pines	Brad Fisher	4 episodes
2015	Garage Sale Mystery: The Wedding Dress	Ted Thompson	Television film
2015	The Christmas Note	Phil	Television film
2015	Angel of Christmas	David Nicholas	Television film
2015–2018	Unreal	Asa Goldberg	5 episodes
2016	Timeless	General	Episode: "Atomic City"
2016	Christmas Cookies	Miles Thurber	Television film
2016	Operation Christmas	General Holt	Television film
2016	Shut Eye	Nadine's Husband	2 episodes
2017	Prison Break	Harlan Gaines	Episode: "Wine Dark Sea"
2017	Teen Wolf	Man who released Hellhound	Episode: "Said the Spider to the Fly" (uncredited)
2017–2021, 2023	Riverdale	Clifford Blossom / Claudius Blossom	16 episodes (as Clifford); 7 episodes (as Claudius)
2017–present	Darrow & Darrow	Raymond	Television film
2018	Aurora Teagarden: Last Scene Alive	Joel Parker	Television film
2018	Salvation	General Wallace	2 episodes
2019	A Godwink Christmas: Meant for Love	Nabeh	Television film
2020	Upload	Oliver Kannerman	4 episodes
2022–2024	Resident Alien	Gerald Bloom	2 episodes: "Radio Harry," "Here Comes My Baby"

=== Video games ===
Year	Title	Role	Ref.
2003	Dino Crisis 3	Additional voices	
