= Dora Mavor Moore Award for Best Production (General Theatre) =

The Dora Mavor Moore Award for Outstanding Production of a Play is an annual award celebrating achievements in live Canadian theatre.

== Awards and nominations ==
=== 1980s ===
Year	Play	Production companies	Ref
1980
1980	Balconville	Centaur Theatre Productions, Toronto Arts Productions	
1980	Ain't Lookin'	Toronto Workshop Productions	
1980	Paper Wheat	25th Street Theatre, Toronto Free Theatre	
1980	Strawberry Fields	Toronto Free Theatre	
1981
1981	Theatre of the Film Noir	Factory Theatre Lab	
1981	Arms and the Man	Douglas Beattie, Toronto Truck Theatre	
1981	The Last Meeting of the Knights of the White Magnolia	Theatre Plus	
1981	Loose Ends	Tarragon Theatre	
1982
1982	Tamara	Tamara International, Necessary Angel	
1982	Blind Dancers and Straight Ahead	Toronto Free Theatre	
1982	Dreaming and Duelling	Shaw Festival, Young People's Theatre	
1982	Night and Day	Toronto Free Theatre	
1983
1983	Translations	Toronto Free Theatre, Stratford Festival	
1983	The Art of War	Factory Theatre	
1983	O.D. on Paradise	Theatre Passe Muraille	
1983	Unseen Hand	Toronto Free Theatre	
1984
1984	Cloud Nine	Schwarz/Sewell Productions	
1984	Delicatessen	Toronto Free Theatre	
1984	The Dining Room	Gemstone Productions	
1984	In the Jungle of Cities	Toronto Free Theatre	
1984	Trafford Tanzi	Toronto Free Theatre, National Arts Centre	
1985
1985	Cyrano de Bergerac	Shaw Festival	
1985	Albertine in Five Times	Théâtre du Petit Bonheur	
1985	Criminals in Love	Factory Theatre	
1985	The History of the Village of the Small Huts: New France	VideoCabaret, Theatre Passe Muraille	
1985	Uncle Vanya	Tarragon Theatre	
1986
1986	Spring Awakening	CentreStage	
1986	Farther West	Tarragon Theatre	
1986	Ghetto	Toronto Workshop Productions	
1986	Hosanna	Théâtre du Petit Bonheur	
1986	The Miracle Worker	Young People's Theatre	
1987
1987	B-Movie: The Play	Shaw Festival	
1987	Aunt Dan and Lemon	Tarragon Theatre	
1987	Bedtimes and Bullies	Young People's Theatre	
1987	Bonjour, la, bonjour	Théâtre du Petit Bonheur	
1987	Saturday Sunday Monday	CentreStage	
1988
1988	Nothing Sacred	CentreStage	
1988	Detaining Mr. Trotsky	Toronto Free Theatre	
1988	I Am Yours	Tarragon Theatre	
1988	Something in the Air	Toronto Workshop Productions	
1988	Zastrozzi, The Master of Discipline	Factory Theatre	
1989
1989	Dry Lips Oughta Move to Kapuskasing	Theatre Passe Muraille, Native Earth Performing Arts	
1989	The Dragons Trilogy	Theatre Repere, Factory Theatre	
1989	Les Fridolinades	Théâtre français de Toronto	
1989	The Road to Mecca	Canadian Stage	
1989	Under the Skin	Theatre Passe Muraille	

=== 1990s ===
Year	Play	Production companies	Ref
1990
1990	Love and Anger	Factory Theatre	
1990	Breaking the Code	Canadian Stage, Citadel Theatre	
1990	The Collected Works of Billy the Kid	Tarragon Theatre	
1990	The Europeans	Necessary Angel	
1990	The Father	Tarragon Theatre	
1991
1991	Lilies	Theatre Passe Muraille	
1991	The Arab's Mouth	Factory Theatre	
1991	Burn This	Theatre Plus Toronto	
1991	La Maison suspendue	Théâtre français de Toronto, Canadian Stage	
1991	7 Stories	Tarragon Theatre	
1992
1992	Three Sisters	Equity Showcase Theatre, Banff Centre for the Arts	
1992	Elvire Jouvet 40	Théâtre de Quat'Sous, Théâtre français de Toronto	
1992	Hamlet	Theatre Plus Toronto	
1992	Naomi's Road	Young People's Theatre	
1992	Under the Influence	Paulette Phillips, Factory Theatre	
1993
1993	Whale	Young People's Theatre	
1993	Le Bal	Theatre Plus Toronto	
1993	Fallen Angels	Canadian Stage	
1994
1994	Homeward Bound	Canadian Stage	
1994	Abundance	Theatre Plus Thorne	
1994	A Christmas Carol	Young People's Theatre	
1994	Twelfth Night	Canadian Stage	
1995
1995	Molly Wood	Lovers and Madmen	
1995	Hay Fever	Canadian Stage, The Grand Theatre	
1995	Six Degrees of Separation	Canadian Stage, Manitoba Theatre Centre	
1995	The Wall (Mur-Mur)	Young People's Theatre, Dynamo Theatre	
1995	Whale	Young People's Theatre, Dynamo Theatre	
1996
1996	The Seven Streams of the River Ota	Harbourfront Centre, Ex Machina	
1996	The Dead Souls	Harbourfront Centre, Carbone 14	
1996	Elsinore	Harbourfront Centre, Ex Machina	
1996	Two Weeks with the Queen	Young People's Theatre, Alberta Theatre Projects	
1997
1997	The Three Lives of Lucie Cabrol	Harbourfront Centre, Theatre de Complicité	
1997	Arcadia	Canadian Stage, Manitoba Theatre Centre	
1997	Death of a Salesman	Mirvish Productions, Manitoba Theatre Centre	
1997	Oliver Twist, or The Street Boy's Progress	Young People's Theatre	
1997	Stomp	Follows Latimer Productions, Joan Mathers, Columbia Artists Management	
1998
1998	Patience	Tarragon Theatre	
1998	The Designated Mourner	Tarragon Theatre	
1998	Inexpressible Island	Necessary Angel, Canadian Stage	
1998	Molly Sweeney	Canadian Stage, The Grand Theatre	
1998	Problem Child	Factory Theatre	
1999
1999	The Drawer Boy	Theatre Passe Muraille	
1999	Billy Bishop Goes to War	Canadian Stage, Vancouver Playhouse Theatre	
1999	Insomnia	The Theatre Centre, Augusta Company	
1999	Kilt	Tarragon Theatre, Shaw Festival	
1999	The Memory of Water	Tarragon Theatre	

=== 2000s ===
Year	Play	Production companies	Ref
2000
2000	Endgame	Soulpepper Theatre Company, Harbourfront Centre	
2000	Faust	Tarragon Theatre	
2000	The Overcoat	Canadian Stage	
2000	Platonov	Soulpepper Theatre, Harbourfront Centre	
2000	Street of Blood	Canadian Stage	
2001
2001	Platonov	Soulpepper Theatre	
2001	Happy	Canadian Stage, Rink-a-Dink	
2001	I, Claudia	Tarragon Theatre	
2001	Smudge	Nightwood Theatre	
2001	Stones in His Pockets	Mirvish Productions, Paul Elliott, Adam Kenwright, Pat Moylan	
2002
2002	The Island	Xhosa Theatrical Productions	
2002	The Adventures of a Black Girl in Search of God	Nightwood Theatre, Obsidian Theatre	
2002	In On It	Buddies in Bad Times, da da kamera	
2002	Skylight	Tarragon Theatre	
2002	This Hotel	Planet 88 Productions, Theatre Passe Muraille	
2003
2003	Girl in the Goldfish Bowl	Tarragon Theatre	
2003	Absolutely Chekhov	Soulpepper Theatre	
2003	The League of Nathans	Factory Theatre	
2003	Romeo/Juliet Remixed	Spark Productions	
2003	Russell Hill	Tarragon Theatre	
2004
2004	The Syringa Tree	Canadian Stage	
2004	China Doll	Nightwood Theatre	
2004	Confederation	VideoCabaret	
2004	Remnants	Tarragon Theatre	
2004	Simpl	Tarragon Theatre, National Arts Centre	
2005
2005	Bigger Than Jesus	Necessary Angel	
2005	Blue Planet	Lorraine Kimsa Theatre for Young People	
2005	Half Life	Tarragon Theatre, Necessary Angel	
2005	The Leisure Society	Factory Theatre	
2005	Take Me Out	Canadian Stage	
2006
2006	Our Town	Soulpepper Theatre	
2006	A Beautiful View	Buddies in Bad Times, da da kamera	
2006	blood.claat - one womban story	Theatre Passe Muraille	
2006	Léo	Tarragon Theatre	
2006	The Monument	Obsidian Theatre	
2007
2007	Scorched	Tarragon Theatre	
2007	Here Lies Henry	Buddies in Bad Times, da da kamera	
2007	Insomnia	Necessary Angel, Theatre Junction	
2007	Leaving Home	Soulpepper Theatre	
2007	Of Mice and Men	Canadian Stage, Theatre Calgary	
2008
2008	The December Man	Canadian Stage	
2008	Intimate Apparel	Obsidian Theatre	
2008	The Misanthrope	Théâtre français de Toronto	
2008	Rose	Harold Green Jewish Theatre	
2008	Top Girls	Soulpepper Theatre	
2009
2009	Agokwe	Buddies in Bad Times	
2009	Festen	The Company Theatre	
2009	I, Claudia	Young Centre for the Performing Arts, Crow's Theatre	
2009	Radio Play	Young Centre for the Performing Arts, Peggy Baker Dance Projects	
2009	A Raisin in the Sun	Soulpepper Theatre	

=== 2010s ===
Year	Play	Production companies	Ref
2010	Parfumerie	Soulpepper Theatre Company	
2010	Courageous	Tarragon Theatre, Citadel Theatre	
2010	Hamlet	Necessary Angel, Harbourfront Centre	
2010	If We Were Birds	Tarragon Theatre, Groundwater Productions	
2010	7 Stories	Canadian Stage, Theatre Calgary	
2011	Blasted	Buddies in Bad Times	
2011	The Africa Trilogy	Volcano Theatre, Luminato	
2011	Brothel #9	Factory Theatre	
2011	The Railway Children	The Touring Consortium, Marquis Entertainment	
2011	Ruined	Obsidian Theatre, Nightwood Theatre	
2012	Topdog/Underdog	Obsidian Theatre, Shaw Festival	
2012	Crash	Theatre Passe Muraille	
2012	The Golden Dragon	Tarragon Theatre	
2012	The Penelopiad	Nightwood Theatre	
2012	War Horse	Mirvish Productions	
2013	Obaaberima	Buddies in Bad Times	
2013	Arigato, Tokyo	Buddies in Bad Times	
2013	The Crucible	Soulpepper Theatre	
2013	The Little Years	Tarragon Theatre	
2013	Someone Else	Crow's Theatre, Canadian Stage	
2014	Of Human Bondage	Soulpepper Theatre Company	
2014	The Double	Tarragon Theatre	
2014	Lungs	Tarragon Theatre	
2014	PIG	Buddies in Bad Times	
2014	Venus in Fur	Canadian Stage	
2015	Accidental Death of an Anarchist	Soulpepper Theatre Company	
2015	An Enemy of the People	Tarragon Theatre	
2015	Hooked	Theatre Passe Muraille	
2015	Tom at the Farm	Buddies in Bad Times	
2015	Twelve Angry Men	Soulpepper Theatre	
2016	Botticelli in the Fire & Sunday in Sodom	Canadian Stage	
2016	Bombay Black	Factory Theatre	
2016	The Great War	VideoCabaret	
2016	Mustard	Tarragon Theatre	
2016	Salt-Water Moon	Factory Theatre	
2017	Father Comes Home From the Wars (Parts I, II, III)	Soulpepper Theatre Company	
2017	Body Politic	Buddies in Bad Times, lemonTree Creations	
2017	Incident at Vichy	Soulpepper Theatre	
2017	"Master Harold"...and the Boys	Obsidian Theatre, Shaw Festival	
2017	Mouthpiece	Quote Unquote Collective, Nightwood Theatre	
2018	Jerusalem	Outside the March, Company Theatre, Starvox Entertainment	
2018	A Delicate Balance	Soulpepper Theatre Company	
2018	Kiinalik: These Sharp Tools	Buddies in Bad Times and Theatre Passe-Muraille	
2018	LULU v.7 // aspects of a femme fatale	Buddies in Bad Times, red light district	
2018	Waiting for Godot	Soulpepper Theatre Company	
2019	School Girls, or The African Mean Girls Play	Obsidian Theatre, Nightwood Theatre	
2019	bug	Luminato Festival, Manidoons Collective	
2019	Middletown	Crow's Theatre, Shaw Festival	
2019	The Royale	Soulpepper Theatre	
2019	Secret Life of a Mother	SLOM Collective, The Theatre Centre	

=== 2020s ===
Year	Play	Production companies	Ref
2020	The Brothers Size	Soulpepper Theatre Company	
2020	Buffoon	Tarragon Theatre	
2020	Forget Me Not	Ronnie Burkett Theatre of Marionettes, Luminato Festival	
2020	Julius Caesar	Groundling Theatre, Crow's Theatre	
2020	A Streetcar Named Desire	Soulpepper Theatre	
2021	No ceremony held due to the effect of the COVID-19 pandemic in Canada on theatre production in 2020.		
2022	Wildfire	Factory Theatre	
2022	Harry Potter and the Cursed Child	Mirvish Productions, Sonia Friedman Productions, Colin Callender, Harry Potter Theatrical Productions	
2022	Is God Is	Obsidian Theatre, Necessary Angel, Canadian Stage	
2022	The Land Acknowledgement, or As You Like It	Crow's Theatre	
2022	Orphans for the Czar	Crow's Theatre	
2023	Red Velvet	Crow's Theatre	
2023	Da Kink in My Hair	TO Live, Soulpepper Theatre Company	
2023	Maanomaa, My Brother	Blue Bird Theatre Collective, Canadian Stage	
2023	our place	Cahoots Theatre, Theatre Passe Muraille	
2023	Uncle Vanya	Crow's Theatre	
2024	Three Sisters	Soulpepper Theatre Company, Obsidian Theatre	
2024	Bad Roads	Crow's Theatre	
2024	The Inheritance, Pt. 1	Canadian Stage	
2024	The Master Plan	Crow's Theatre	
2024	Sizwe Banzi Is Dead	Soulpepper Theatre Company	
2025	Mahabharata: Part One: Karma: The Life We Inherit	Why Not Theatre, Canadian Stage	
2025	Flex	Crow's Theatre, Obsidian Theatre	
2025	Mahabharata: Part Two: Dharma: The Life We Choose	Why Not Theatre, Canadian Stage	
2025	Rosmersholm	Crow's Theatre	
2025	Who's Afraid of Virginia Woolf?	Canadian Stage	
2026	Through the Eyes of God	Theatre Passe Muraille	
2026	Bremen Town	Tarragon Theatre	
2026	Copperbelt	National Arts Centre, Soulpepper Theatre Company	
2026	The Misunderstanding (Le malentendu)	Théâtre français de Toronto	
2026	Rogers v. Rogers	Crow's Theatre	
