= Denise Cronenberg =

Canadian costume designer (1938–2020)

Denise Cronenberg (1 October 1938 – 22 May 2020) was a Canadian costume designer.

Cronenberg was born in Toronto, Ontario and was the sister of film director David Cronenberg and the mother of filmmaker Aaron Woodley. She produced work for films such as Dawn of the Dead and The Incredible Hulk.

Cronenberg and her brother first worked together on 1986's The Fly, a remake of the 1958 film of the same name. They went on to collaborate on many other films including Dead Ringers, Naked Lunch, Crash, Eastern Promises, Spider, and A Dangerous Method, receiving several award nominations for her designs.

She died due to "complications from old age" in Burlington, Ontario in May 2020 at the age of 81.

== Works ==
- The Fly (1986)
- Dead Ringers (1988)
- The Long Road Home (1989)
- The Guardian (1990)
- Naked Lunch (1991)
- M. Butterfly (1993)
- Moonlight and Valentino (1995)
- Crash (1996)
- Murder at 1600 (1997)
- Mad City (1997) Alan Alda's wardrobe
- A Cool, Dry Place (1998)
- The Wager (1998) (also executive producer)
- eXistenZ (1999)
- The Third Miracle (1999)
- Bless the Child (2000)
- Dracula 2000 (2000)
- Camera (2000)
- The Caveman's Valentine (2002)
- Spider (2002)
- Avenging Angelo (2002)
- Rhinoceros Eyes (2003)
- Dawn of the Dead (2004)
- A History of Violence (2005)
- Dead Silence (2007)
- Shoot 'Em Up (2007)
- The Incredible Hulk (2008)
- The Fly (2008), opera by Howard Shore
- Resident Evil: Afterlife (2010)
- Cosmopolis (2012)
