= John Roby (composer) =

Canadian composer

John Roby is a Canadian film and theatre composer and pianist.

A native of Windsor, Nova Scotia, he began writing music for theatre projects in Halifax in the 1970s, and served as the pianist on Noel Harrison's television variety show Take Time with Noel Harrison, before moving to Toronto, Ontario, in 1976. He composed music for several of George F. Walker's plays, including Zastrozzi, The Master of Discipline, Filthy Rich, Rumors of Our Death, Theatre of the Film Noir, Science and Madness, and The Art of War.

In 1984 he composed music for Jim Betts's The Mystery of the Oak Island Treasure.

In the latter half of the 1980s he became known for several musicals he cowrote with Raymond Storey, including Country Chorale, Girls in the Gang, and The Dreamland. In 1990 he collaborated with Tim Wynne-Jones on Mischief City, a musical for kids based on Wynne-Jones's 1986 book.

In 1993 he premiered The Old Man's Band, his first show written entirely on his own rather than with a collaborator.

He has also had credits as a composer of film scores, most notably on Thom Fitzgerald's films The Hanging Garden and Beefcake.

He married actress Patricia Vanstone in 1981.

== Awards ==
Award	Year	Category	Work	Result	Ref(s)
Genie Awards	2000	Best Original Score	Beefcake with John Wesley Chisholm, Michael Diabo	Nominated	
Dora Mavor Moore Awards	1981	Outstanding New Score	Theatre of the Film Noir	Won	
Dora Mavor Moore Awards	1984	Outstanding New Play	Mystery of the Oak Island Treasure with Jim Betts	Nominated	
Dora Mavor Moore Awards	1988	Outstanding New Revue or Musical	Girls in the Gang with Raymond Storey	Won	
Dora Mavor Moore Awards	1995	Outstanding Sound Design, Mid-Size Theatre	The Old Man's Band	Nominated	
Dora Mavor Moore Awards	1998	Outstanding New Musical	Jacob Two-Two's First Spy Case with Mordecai Richler	Nominated	
Dora Mavor Moore Awards	2001	Outstanding Musical Direction	Midnight Sun	Nominated	
