= Dora Mavor Moore Award for Best Production (Musical Theatre) =

The Dora Mavor Moore Award for Outstanding Production of a Musical is an annual award celebrating achievements in live Canadian theatre.

== Awards and nominations ==
=== 1990s ===
Year	Musical	Book	Music	Lyrics	Producer
1990	The Phantom of the Opera	Richard Stilgoe and Andrew Lloyd Webber	Andrew Lloyd Webber	Charles Hart and Richard Stilgoe	Livent
1991	Hush*	Noam Riches (libretto)	Allen Cole	Noam Riches (libretto)	Theatre Passe Muraille
1992	Closer Than Ever	Steven Scott Smith and Richard Maltby, Jr.	David Shire	Richard Maltby, Jr.	Jeffrey Latimer in assoc. with Laurence Follows, and Closer Than Ever Partners
1993	Kiss of the Spider Woman	Terrence McNally	John Kander	Fred Ebb	Livent
1994	Crazy For You	Ken Ludwig	George Gershwin	Ira Gershwin	David and Ed Mirvish, Roger Horchow and Elizabeth Williams
1995	Tommy	Pete Townshend and Des McAnuff	Pete Townshend		David and Ed Mirvish, Concert Productions Int., Pace Theatrical Group, Dodger Productions
1996	A Little Night Music	Hugh Wheeler	Stephen Sondheim		Canadian Stage and Grand Theatre
1997	Ragtime	Terrence McNally	Stephen Flaherty	Lynn Ahrens	Livent
1998	Oedipus Rex with Symphony of Psalms*	Jean Cocteau (libretto)	Igor Stravinsky	Jean Cocteau (libretto)	Canadian Opera Company
1999	Norma*	Felice Romani (libretto)	Vincenzo Bellini	Felice Romani (libretto)	Canadian Opera Company

=== 2000s ===
Year	Musical	Book	Music	Lyrics	Producer
2000	Cabaret	Joe Masteroff	John Kander	Fred Ebb	Mirvish Productions and PACE Theatrical Group / SFX Entertainment
2000	Notre-Dame de Paris	Luc Plamondon	Riccardo Cocciante	Luc Plamondon	Mirvish Productions, SFX Entertainment
2000	Pelléas et Mélisande*	Maurice Maeterlinck (libretto)	Claude Debussy	Maurice Maeterlinck (libretto)	Canadian Opera Company
2000	Shaking the Foundations	Bryden MacDonald	Carole Pope and Kevan Staples		Buddies in Bad Times Theatre
2000	The Lion King	Roger Allers and Irene Mecchi	Elton John	Tim Rice	Mirvish Productions in association with Disney Theatricals
2001 (Final Doras without separate category for Opera)	Billy Budd*	E. M. Forster and Eric Crozier (libretto)	Benjamin Britten	E. M. Forster and Eric Crozier (libretto)	Canadian Opera Company
2001 (Final Doras without separate category for Opera)	The Bartered Bride*	Karel Sabina (libretto)	Bedřich Smetana	Karel Sabina (libretto)	Canadian Opera Company
2001 (Final Doras without separate category for Opera)	Iron Road*	Mark Brownell (libretto)	Chan Ka Nin	Mark Brownell (libretto)	Tapestry New Opera Works
2001 (Final Doras without separate category for Opera)	Mamma Mia!	Catherine Johnson	Benny Andersson and Björn Ulvaeus	Benny Andersson and Björn Ulvaeus	Mirvish Productions, Littlestar & Universal
2001 (Final Doras without separate category for Opera)	When We Were Singing	Dorothy Dittrich			Buddies in Bad Times Theatre
2002	Anything That Moves	Ann-Marie MacDonald and Alisa Palmer	Allen Cole	Ann-Marie MacDonald	Tarragon Theatre and Nightwood Theatre
2002	Dream A Little Dream: The Nearly True Story of the Mamas and the Papas	Denny Doherty and Paul Ledoux	Various		Dream Productions (Toronto) Inc.
2002	La, La, La, Mine de Rien	Guy Mignault	Various		Théâtre français de Toronto
2002	Real Live Girl	Damien Atkins	Various		Buddies in Bad Times Theatre
2002	Snow White and the Magnificent Seven	Malcolm Heenman	Various		Ross Petty Productions
2003	Little Mercy's First Murder	Morwyn Brebner	Jay Turvey and Paul Sportelli	Morwyn Brebner	Shaw Festival and Tarragon Theatre
2003	A Dixie Gospel	Tom Key and Russell Treyz	Harry Chapin		Brookstone Performing Arts
2003	Robin Hood	Malcolm Heenman	Various		Ross Petty Productions
2003	Snappy Tales: Short Satirical Musicals	Vincent de Tourdonnet	Allen Cole, J. Douglas Dodd, Stephen Eddins and Jim Kass	Vincent de Tourdonnet	Theatre Non Nobis
2003	Sweeney Todd: The Demon Barber of Fleet Street	Hugh Wheeler	Stephen Sondheim		Canadian Stage
2004	The Producers	Mel Brooks and Thomas Meehan	Mel Brooks		Mirvish Productions
2004	Cookin' at the Cookery	Marion J. Caffey	Alberta Hunter		Canadian Stage in co-production with Manitoba Theatre Centre
2004	Jacob Two-Two Meets the Hooded Fang	Mordecai Richler	Dennis Lee, Phil Balsam, Jim Betts and Allen Cole		Young People's Theatre
2004	Tequila Vampire Matinee	Kevin Quain			Theatre Passe Muraille and Rat-A-Tat-Tat
2004	The Last Five Years	Jason Robert Brown			Canadian Stage
2005	Urinetown	Grg Kotis	Mark Hollmann	Mark Hollmann and Greg Kotis	Canadian Stage
2005	Aladdin	David Finley	Various		Ross Petty Productions
2005	Ain't Misbehavin'	Murray Horwitz and Richard Maltby Jr.	Fats Waller	Various	Canadian Stage and Dancap Private Equity Inc.
2005	Autour de Kurt Weill	Guy Mignault	Various		Théâtre français de Toronto
2005	Hairspray	Mark O'Donnell and Thomas Meehan	Marc Shaiman	Scott Wittmman and Marc Shaiman	Mirvish Productions
2006	The Lord of the Rings	Shaun McKenna and Matthew Warchus	A.R. Rahman, Värttinä and Christopher Nightingale	Shaun McKenna and Matthew Warchus	Kevin Wallace and Saul Zaentz in association with David & Ed Mirvish and Michael Cohl
2006	BoyGroove	Chris Craddock	Aaron Macri		Michael Rubinoff & Derrick Chua in association with BoyGroove Entertainment Inc.
2006	Bunnicula	Jon Klein	Chris Jeffries	Jon Klein	Young People's Theatre
2006	Song & Dance	None credited	Andrew Lloyd Webber	Don Black	Song & Dance Limited Partnership in association with Diversified Productions Inc.
2006	Snow White and the Group of Seven	David Finley	Various		Ross Petty Productions
2007	We Will Rock You	Ben Elton	Queen		David and Ed Mirvish and the Kimsa Group in association with Queen Theatrical Productions, Phil McIntyre Entertainment and Tribeca Theatricals
2007	i think i can	Florence Gibson and Shawn Byfield	Various		Young People's Theatre
2007	The Rocky Horror Show	Richard O'Brien			Canadian Stage in co-production with Manitoba Theatre Centre
2007	Seussical	Lynn Ahrens and Stephen Flaherty	Stephen Flaherty	Lynn Ahrens	Young People's Theatre
2007	The Story of My Life	Brian Hill	Neil Bartram		Canadian Stage
2008	Fire	Paul Ledoux and David S. Young	Various		Canadian Stage in co-production with Citadel Theatre
2008	Arthouse Cabaret	Jim LeFrancois and David Oiye	Various		Buddies in Bad Times Theatre
2008	Dirty Dancing	Eleanor Bergstein	Various		David Mirvish and Jacobsen Entertainment, Lionsgate and Magic Hour Productions
2008	Little Shop of Horrors	Howard Ashman	Alan Menken	Howard Ashman	Canadian Stage
2008	A Man of No Importance	Terrence McNally	Stephen Flaherty	Lynn Ahrens	Acting Up Stage Theatre Company
2009	The Sound of Music	Howard Lindsay and Russel Crouse	Richard Rodgers	Oscar Hammerstein II	Andrew Lloyd Webber, David Ian, David Mirvish
2009	Cinderella: The Sillylicious Family Musical	Chris Earle	Various		Ross Petty Productions
2009	The Forbidden Phoenix	Marty Chan	Robert Walsh	Marty Chan and Robert Walsh	Young People's Theatre in partnership with Citadel Theatre
2009	Jersey Boys	Marshall Brickman and Rick Elice	Bob Gaudio	Bob Crewe	Dancap Productions Inc., Dodger Theatricals, Joseph J. Grano, Tamara and Kevin Kinsella, Pelican Group, Latitude Link and Rick Steiner
2009	A New Brain	William Finn and James Lapine	William Finn		Acting Up Stage Theatre Company

=== 2010s ===
Year	Musical	Book	Music	Lyrics	Producer
2010 (1st Doras with a Musical Theatre Division)	Assassins	John Weidman	Stephen Sondheim		BirdLand Theatre and Talk is Free Theatre
2010 (1st Doras with a Musical Theatre Division)	Altar Boyz	Kevin Del Aguila	Gary Adler and Michael Patrick Walker		Angelwalk Theatre
2010 (1st Doras with a Musical Theatre Division)	The Light in the Piazza	Craig Lucas	Adam Guettel		Acting Up Stage Company
2010 (1st Doras with a Musical Theatre Division)	Mimi	Melody Johnson and Rick Roberts	Allen Cole	Allen Cole, Melody Johnson and Rick Roberts	Tarragon Theatre
2010 (1st Doras with a Musical Theatre Division)	The Toxic Avenger	Joe DiPietro	David Bryan	Joe DiPietro	Dancap Productions Inc.
2011	A Year with Frog and Toad	Willie Reale	Robert Reale	Willie Reale	Young People's Theatre
2011	Billy Elliot the Musical	Lee Hall	Elton John	Lee Hall	David Mirvish presents Universal Pictures Stage Productions, Working Title Films, Old Vic Productions in association with Weinstein Live Entertainment
2011	Parade	Alfred Uhry	Jason Robert Brown		Acting Up Stage & Studio 180 Theatre
2011	Priscilla, Queen of the Desert	Stephan Elliott and Allan Scott	Various		Mirvish Productions
2011	title of show	Hunter Bell	Jeff Bowen		Angelwalk Theatre
2012	Caroline, or Change	Tony Kushner	Jeanine Tesori	Tony Kushner	Acting Up Stage Company in association with Obsidian Theatre Company
2012	I Love You Because	Ryan Cunningham		Joshua Salzman	Angelwalk Theatre
2012	Seussical	Lynn Ahrens and Stephen Flaherty	Stephen Flaherty	Lynn Ahrens	Young People's Theatre
2013	Cinderella	Mike Kenny	Jason Jestadt	Mike Kenny	Young People's Theatre
2013	Bloodless: The Trial of Burke and Hare	Joseph Aragon			Theatre 20
2013	Do You Want What I Have Got? A Craigslist Cantata	Bill Richardson	Veda Hille	Bill Richardson	Acting Up Stage Theatre Company and Factory Theatre
2013	Falsettos	William Finn and James Lapine	William Finn		Acting Up Stage Company in association with Harold Green Jewish Theatre Company
2013	The Wizard of Oz	Andrew Lloyd Webber and Jeremy Sams	Harold Arlen and Andrew Lloyd Webber	E.Y. Harburg and Tim Rice	Bill Kenwright, The Really Useful Group, David Mirvish, Troika Entertainment, Warner Bros. Theatre Ventures
2014	London Road	Alecky Blythe	Adam Cork	Alecky Blythe and Adam Cork	Canadian Stage
2014	The Barber of Seville	Michael O'Brien, adapted from Beaumarchais	John Millard, adapted from Rossini	Michael O'Brien, adapted from Beaumarchais	Soulpepper Theatre Company
2014	le fa le do	Luc Moquin	Claude Naubert	Luc Moquin	Théâtre français de Toronto & Théâtre Catapulte
2014	Les Misérables	Alain Boublil and Claude-Michel Schönberg	Claude-Michel Schönberg	Alain Boublil and Jean-Marc Natel	Cameron Mackintosh, NETworks and David Mirvish
2014	Once On This Island	Lynn Ahrens	Stephen Flaherty	Lynn Ahrens	Acting Up Stage Company in association with Obsidian Theatre Company
2015	Once	Enda Walsh	Glen Hansard and Markéta Irglová		David Mirvish in association with Barbara Broccoli, John N. Hart Jr, Patrick Milling Smith, Frederick Zollo
2015	James and the Giant Peach	Timothy Allen McDonald	Benj Pasek and Justin Paul		Young People's Theatre
2015	Life, Death and the Blues	Raoul Bhaneja	Various		Theatre Passe Muraille in association with Hope and Hell Theatre Co.
2015	Spoon River	Mike Ross and Albert Schultz	Mike Ross	Mike Ross and Albert Schultz	Soulpepper Theatre Company
2015	The Wild Party	Michael John LaChiusa and George C. Wolfe	Michael John LaChiusa		Acting Up Stage Company in association with Obsidian Theatre Company
2016	Kinky Boots	Harvey Fierstein	Cyndi Lauper		Mirvish Productions
2016	Century Song	Neema Bickersteth, Ross Manson and Kate Alton	Various		Volcano Theatre
2016	Grey Gardens	Doug Wright	Scott Frankel	Michael Korie	Acting Up Stage Company
2016	One Night Only: The Greatest Musical Never Written	Alan Kliffer	James Smith	Cast	Golden Ages Productions
2016	The Wizard of Oz	John Kane	Harold Arlen	Harold Arlen and E.Y. Harburg	Young People's Theatre
2017	Come From Away	Irene Sankoff and David Hein			Junkyard Dog Productions, Jerry Frankel, Latitude Link, Smith & Brant Theatricals, Steve & Paula Reynolds, David Mirvish, Michael Rubinoff, Yonge Street Theatricals, Sheridan College, Allan Detsky & Rena Mendelson and Just for Laughs Theatricals
2017	Counting Sheep	Marc Marczyk and Marichka Marczyk			The Lemon Bucket Orkestra
2017	Matilda: The Musical	Dennis Kelly	Tim Minchin		David Mirvish, Royal Shakespeare Company and the Dodgers
2017	Passing Strange	Stew	Stew and Heidi Rodewald	Stew	The Musical Stage Company & Obsidian Theatre Company
2017	Seussical	Lynn Ahrens and Stephen Flaherty	Stephen Flaherty	Lynn Ahrens	Young People's Theatre
2018	Life After	Britta Johnson			The Musical Stage Company, Canadian Stage, and Yonge Street Theatricals
2018	Beauty and the Beast	Linda Woolverton	Alan Menken	Howard Ashman and Tim Rice	Young People's Theatre
2018	Fun Home	Lisa Kron	Jeanine Tesori	Lisa Kron	The Musical Stage Company presented by David Mirvish
2018	Mr. Shi and His Lover	Wong Teng Chi and Njo Kong Kie	Njo Kong Kie	Wong Teng Chi and Njo Kong Kie	Music Picnic/Point View Art Association/Macau Experimental Theatre presented by Tarragon Theatre
2018	Onegin	Amiel Gladstone and Veda Hille			The Musical Stage Company
2019	Next to Normal	Brian Yorkey	Tom Kitt	Brian Yorkey	The Musical Stage Company presented by David Mirvish
2019	Dear Evan Hansen	Steven Levenson	Benj Pasek and Justin Paul		Stacey Mindich and David Mirvish
2019	Kiss of the Spider Woman	Terrence McNally	John Kander	Fred Ebb	Eclipse Theatre Company
2019	Mary Poppins	Julian Fellowes	Richard M. Sherman, Robert B. Sherman and George Stiles	Richard M. Sherman, Robert B. Sherman and Anthony Drewe	Young People's Theatre
2019	Rose	Mike Ross and Sarah Wilson	Mike Ross	Sarah Wilson	Soulpepper Theatre Company

=== 2020s ===
Year	Musical	Book	Music	Lyrics	Producer
2020	Piaf/Dietrich	Daniel Grobe Boymann and Thomas Kahry, playwrights Erin Shields, adapter	Various		David Mirvish
2020	The Adventures of Pinocchio	Brian Hill	Neil Bartram		Young People's Theatre
2020	Caroline, or Change	Tony Kushner	Jeanine Tesori	Tony Kushner	The Musical Stage Company & Obsidian Theatre
2020	Ghost Quartet	Dave Malloy			Crow's Theatre & Eclipse Theatre Company
2020	Life in a Box	Landon Doak and Matthew Finlan			Bad Hats Theatre
2021	No ceremony held due to the effect of the COVID-19 pandemic in Canada on theatre production in 2020.				
2022	Sweeney Todd: The Demon Barber of Fleet Street	Hugh Wheeler	Stephen Sondheim		Talk is Free Theatre
2022	& Juliet	David West Read	Max Martin		David Mirvish presents the Max Martin, Tim Headington, Theresa Steele Page, Jenny Petersson, Martin Dodd production
2022	Boy Falls From the Sky	Jake Epstein	Various		David Mirvish and Past Future Productions
2022	Dixon Road	Fatuma Adar			The Musical Stage Company & Obsidian Theatre Company, in association with Canadian Stage
2022	Into the Woods	James Lapine	Stephen Sondheim		Talk is Free Theatre
