= Iron Road =

Iron Road is the name of:

- Iron Road (film), a 2009 Canada/China television miniseries
- Iron Road Railways, a former railroad company in Maine, Quebec, New Brunswick and Nova Scotia from 1994 to 2002
- Iron Road Limited, an Australian iron ore exploration and mining company established in 2008
- Iron Road (opera), a 2001 Canadian opera in two acts

== See also ==
- Via ferrata, the Italian words for "iron road", a kind of protected climbing route
