= Crow's Theatre =

Professional theatre in Toronto, Ontario

Crow's Theatre is a professional non-profit theatre company located in the East End of Toronto, Ontario. A member of the Professional Association of Canadian Theatres (PACT), the theatre is a winner of multiple Toronto Theatre Critics Awards and Dora Mavor Moore Awards.

Crow's was founded in 1983 by Jim Millan, and operated without a permanent venue until 2017, when it opened the Streetcar Crowsnest with the premiere of Kristen Thomson's The Wedding Party. This venue, at the intersection of Dundas Street East and Carlaw Avenue in the Leslieville neighbourhood, houses the 200-seat Guloien Theatre and 90-seat Scotiabank Community Studio, and has hosted a number of award-winning productions. The first show in the studio was Freedom Singer by then-associate artistic director Andrew Kushnir and Khari Wendell McClelland.

The Crow's acclaimed co-production with The Musical Stage Company of the Canadian premiere of Natasha, Pierre & the Great Comet of 1812, directed by Chris Abraham, won four Dora Awards in 2024, and transferred to Mirvish's Royal Alexandra Theatre in 2025.

In 2007, Abraham took over the role of artistic director from Millan. Sherrie Johnson, formerly of Canadian Stage Company, has served as executive director since 2019. Crow's offers a diverse range of year-round programming, including plays, musicals and family-friendly productions.

Crow's 2021 production of Cliff Cardinal's The Land Acknowledgement, or As You Like It was revived by Mirvish Productions in 2023 and has toured internationally, including to the 2024 London International Festival of Theatre.

== Notable productions ==
- Natasha, Pierre & the Great Comet of 1812 (Dec 5, 2023 - Mar 24, 2024, transferred to Mirvish Productions July 15 - August 24, 2025)
- The Master Plan (Sep 5 - Oct 19, 2023)
- Red Velvet (Nov 22 - Dec 18, 2022)
- Eternal Hydra (2009)
- Unidentified Human Remains and the True Nature of Love (starring Brent Carver, 1990)
