= Theatre of the Film Noir =

Theatre of the Film Noir is a stage play by Canadian playwright George F. Walker. Inspired by film noir tropes, the play centres on Inspector Clair, a detective who is investigating the death of Jean, a young gay resistance fighter in the aftermath of the Liberation of Paris in 1944.

Characters in the play include Bernard, Jean's lover; Liliane, Jean's sister; Eric, a German Nazi officer and Liliane's lover whom she is hiding in her home to protect him; and Hank, an American soldier whom Liliane enlists to kill Bernard before he can inform the detective about Eric.

The play was originally promoted as an adaptation of an unpublished play by a French playwright named Henri Berger, although this was a publicity stunt and neither Henri Berger nor the "original" play actually existed. In fact, the play drew on some plot and character elements of Jean Genet's novel Funeral Rites, to the extent that the producers took the precaution of having copyright lawyers review the works before taking the production on a European tour, with the lawyers ultimately finding that the works were different enough to not raise infringement issues.

== Productions ==
It was first staged by Factory Theatre in Toronto as part of the Toronto Theatre Festival, with its cast including Stephen Bush as Inspector Clair, David Bolt as Bernard, Susan Purdy as Liliane, Jim Henshaw as Eric and Peter Blais as Hank.

A 1986 production at the Great Canadian Theatre Company in Ottawa featured Blais playing the role of Bernard, with John Koensgen as Inspector Clair, Lorina Harding as Liliane, Robert Bockstael as Eric and Terrence Scammell as Hank.

A 1993 production by Folio Theatre Company in Chicago, Illinois, starred Peter Blood as the inspector, Tim Curtis as Bernard, Amy Carlson as Liliane, Alec Wild as Eric and Kirk Sanders as Hank.

== Awards ==
Award	Year	Category	Nominee	Result	Ref(s)
Dora Mavor Moore Awards	1981	Best Production, General Theatre	Factory Theatre Lab	Won	
Dora Mavor Moore Awards	1981	Best Original Play, General Theatre	George F. Walker	Nominated	
Dora Mavor Moore Awards	1981	Best Direction, General Theatre	George F. Walker	Won	
Dora Mavor Moore Awards	1981	Best Lighting Design, General Theatre	Jim Plaxton	Won	
Dora Mavor Moore Awards	1981	Best Original Score, General Theatre	John Roby	Won	
Governor General's Award	1981	English-language drama	George F. Walker	Nominated	
Floyd S. Chalmers Canadian Play Award	1982	Best Play	George F. Walker	Honored	
