= Mark Brownell =

Canadian writer

Mark Brownell is a Toronto-based playwright and co-artistic director of the Pea Green Theatre Group with his wife, Sue Miner.

He is the author of a number of plays, including Monsieur D'Eon is a Woman, which was nominated for a Governor General's Award. His libretto for the opera Iron Road won a Dora Mavor Moore Award and he was nominated for a Dora for his 2006 play, Medici Slot Machine.

Other award-winning work includes The Martha Stewart Project, Playballs, High Sticking - Three Period Plays, The Chevalier St. George, The Storyteller's Bag and The Weaving Maiden.

Mark is a graduate of the National Theatre School of Canada, and has been a playwright-in-residence at Toronto's Tarragon Theatre. He lives in Toronto with his wife and two children, Lily and Gavin.

== Produced stage plays ==
- Medici Slot Machine (premiere: Tarragon Theatre Extra Space, Toronto. Nominated for Best New Play, Dora Mavor Moore Awards)
- The Weaving Maiden (Soundstreams/Tafelmusik, Glenn Gould Studio, Toronto)
- Ice Time (Libretto; Tapestry Music Theatre, The Distillery, Toronto)
- The Story Teller's Bag (Mississauga International Children's Festival and Lorraine Kimsa Theatre for Young People, Toronto)
- The Enfolded Hamlet (Alumnae Theatre New Ideas Festival, Toronto)
- A Horrifying Monologue (Northern Light Theatre, Edmonton)
- The Chevalier Saint-George (Tafelmusik Baroque Ensemble, Toronto)
- Iron Road (Libretto; Tapestry Music Theatre at the Elgin, Toronto. Winner, Best New Musical, Dora Mavor Moore Awards.)
- Tough Change Project (Joseph Workman Theatre, Toronto)
- Monsieur D'Eon is a Woman (Buddies in Bad Times, Toronto. Nominate for a Dora Mavor Moore award and Governor General's Literary Award, Best New Play.)
- Bells and Whistles (New Adventures in Sound, Tarragon Theatre Spring Arts Fair, Toronto)
- Table Top (Tarragon Theatre Spring Arts Fair, Toronto)
- Martha Steward Projects (Buddies in Bad Times, Toronto. Nominated for a Dora Mavor Moore Award)
- The Venetian Elopement (Toronto Fringe Festival)
- Playballs (Open Fist Theatre, Los Angeles. Winner of the Maxim Mazumdar and 20th Century Ensemble Play Competitions)
- Double Play (Theatre Passe Muraille, Toronto)
- A New Woman (Theatre Centre, Under the Umbrella Festival, Toronto)
- The Blue Wall (Alleyway Theatre, Buffalo)
- High Sticking (Lunchbox Theatre, Calgary)
