= Firehall Arts Centre =

Arts centre in Vancouver, Canada

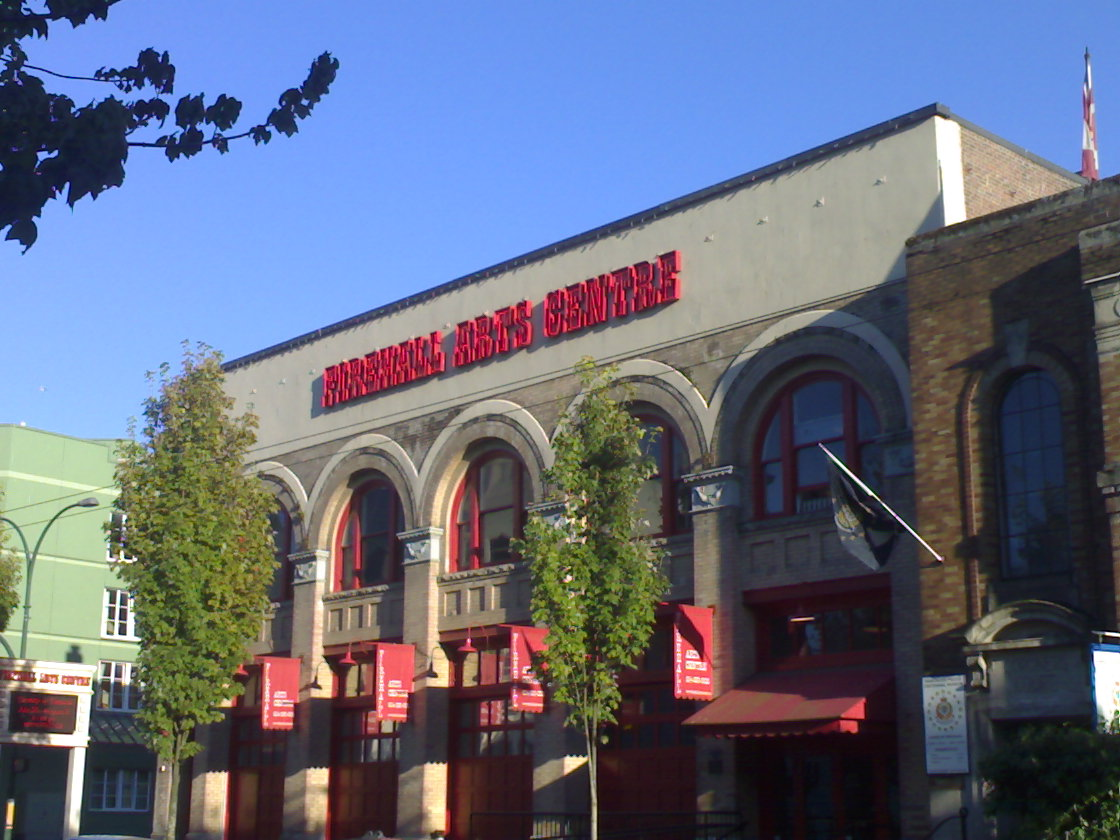
- Firehall Arts Centre in 2007
- Interactive map of Firehall Arts Centre
- Address: 280 East Cordova Street; Vancouver, British Columbia; V6A 1L3
- Coordinates: 49.28205°N 123.09793°W
- Capacity: 150
- Type: Local authority

Construction
- Opened: 1906

Website
- firehallartscentre.ca

The Firehall Arts Centre (also called the Firehall Centre for the Arts) is an arts centre in the Downtown Eastside of Vancouver, British Columbia, Canada. The building also falls within the borders of Gastown. Firehall is a small building, originally built as a fire station in 1906. Formerly, Touchstone Theatre and Axis Mime operated out of the Firehall building. Currently, the administration office of the Dancing on the Edge Festival (not to be confused with the Dancing on the Edge Festival in the Netherlands) is located in the Firehall. Firehall is devoted to exhibiting dance, performance art, and new plays. Firehall is Vancouver's foremost exhibitor of experimental theatre. The theatre has a 150-seat capacity. St. James Anglican Church is diagonally opposite the intersection from Firehall. Every spring, Firehall hosts, and serves as the primary performance venue for the "Dancing on the Edge" dance festival.

Donna Spencer is Firehall's longtime artistic director, and co-founded the company in 1983.

The Firehall Arts Centre is a member of the Professional Association of Canadian Theatres(PACT).
