= Spark (2016 film) =

2016 animated 3D science fiction film

- Theatrical release poster
- Directed by: Aaron Woodley
- Written by: Aaron Woodley
- Story by: Daniel Woo; Aaron Woodley
- Produced by: Tracy Grant; Woo-Kyung Jung; Youngki Lee; Harry Linden; Jun Zheng
- Starring: Jace Norman; Jessica Biel; Susan Sarandon; Patrick Stewart; Hilary Swank
- Edited by: Paul Hunter
- Music by: Robert Duncan
- Production companies: RedRover; ToonBox Entertainment; Hoongman Technology; Gulfstream Pictures; Suning Universal Media
- Distributed by: Elevation Pictures (Canada); Yejilim Entertainment (South Korea); Open Road Films (United States)
- Release dates: April 22, 2016 (TAAFI); April 14, 2017 (United States); April 28, 2017 (Canada); April 12, 2018 (South Korea)
- Running time: 91 minutes
- Countries: Canada; South Korea; United States; China
- Language: English
- Budget: $40 million
- Box office: $1 million

Spark (known as Spark: A Space Tail in the United States) is a 2016 animated science fiction adventure comedy film written and directed by Aaron Woodley, and featuring the voices of Jessica Biel, Hilary Swank, Susan Sarandon, Patrick Stewart, Jace Norman and Alan C. Peterson. The film premiered on April 22, 2016, at the Toronto Animation Arts Festival International. It was released on April 14, 2017, in the United States by Open Road Films with distribution sold by Double Dutch International in all international markets except China and South Korea.

Spark received mostly negative reviews, and was a major box-office bomb, earning only $1 million on a $40 million budget.

== Plot ==
Set in a galaxy where anthropomorphic animals and aliens live together, thirteen years ago, the evil primate General Zhong overthrew his noble brother to seize the throne of the planet Bana, using a spacetime anomaly known as "the slick", which has the ability to create black holes; slicks were made by a wild creature known as a space kraken. The black hole created from the slick partially destroyed Bana, and swallowed up many subjects. Among the few survivors were a monkey only a year old named Spark, a warrior fox named Vix, and a boar mechanic named Chunk.

In the present, Spark, Vix, Chunk and Spark's forgetful nanny bot, Bananny, secretly live on a shard used as a garbage dump, with Vix and Chunk leading insurgency missions against Zhong, although they constantly forbid Spark from coming along. One day, Spark intercepts an e-mail sent to Vix about a new mission, and decides to take the mission himself without her knowing. The e-mail leads to the Queen of Bana, whom Zhong still permits to live in the palace. After Spark infiltrates the palace and meets the Queen, she hands him a kraken-finder, which Zhong wants to use to find and recapture the space kraken in order to destroy another planet. Spark decides to use it to find the kraken himself; he tames the creature and brings it back to the garbage shard. But he then finds his home raided by Zhong's forces, who then capture both him and the kraken. Zhong forces the kraken to make a new slick into which he hurls Spark, Vix, Chunk and the entire garbage shard.

The trio discover that the slick is actually a wormhole that leads to a desert planet. Vix and Chunk get upset at Spark for causing Zhong to obtain the kraken, and then split up. Spark finds survivors of the first slick, living in the King's old flagship battle cruiser. The Captain of the flagship reveals that Spark is in fact the son of the King and Queen, who entrusted Vix and Chunk to hide and protect him. He also reveals that the King had actually died in an accident some years ago, but Spark has a vision of the King when he visits a memorial to him, and finds a special weapon made for the royal family. Spark then learns from the deceased King that his friends have been captured by giant mutated roaches. Spark, with the help of his father's spirit and his roach friend, Floyd, defeats the mutated roaches and rescues Vix and Chunk. Spark rallies Vix, Chunk, the Captain and his survivors to mount an attack on Zhong, and Chunk figures out a way to use technology to make a slick of their own. In the meantime, Zhong uses the space kraken to intimidate the rest of the galaxy.

The flagship and survivors return to Bana through their own slick, and ultimately defeat Zhong's forces after a prolonged battle. Spark personally rescues the queen from Zhong's own flagship, which gets critically damaged during the battle. Spark decides to rescue his "Uncle" Zhong as well, but the annoyed Queen then punches Zhong into the slick after he "begs" for forgiveness.

The film ends with Spark's friends and allies celebrating him becoming the new Prince of Bana.

== Voice cast ==
- Jace Norman as Spark, the 14-year-old son of the queen and the king and the main protagonist of the film.
- Jessica Biel as Vix a fox and Spark's caretaker.
- Hilary Swank as The Queen, the king’s wife and Spark's mother.
- Susan Sarandon as Bananny, Spark's forgetful nanny robot.
- Patrick Stewart as the Flagship Captain.
- Rob deLeeuw as Chunk, Spark's buff wild boar friend.
- Alan C. Peterson as General Zhong, the main antagonist and Spark's uncle.
- Athena Karkanis as Koko, Zhong's muscular enforcer.
- Jordan Pettle as The King, the queen’s husband and Spark's father.
- Ivan Sherry as Announcer
- Evan Taggart as The Artist
- Director Aaron Woodley voices Floyd, a tiny green cockroach-like alien and Spark's friend.

== Production ==
In January 2015, Deadline Hollywood announced that Jessica Biel, Hilary Swank and Susan Sarandon joined the cast with Aaron Woodley directing, and Red Rover, Gulfstream Pictures and ToonBox Entertainment producing. Woodley would also be writing the screenplay with Doug Hadders and Adam Rotstein.

== Music ==
The film's score was composed by Robert Duncan.

=== Personnel ===
- Music by: Robert Duncan
- Music supervisor: Mason Cooper
- Music editor: Kevin Banks, M.P.S.E.
- Lead orchestrator: Timothy Williams
- Orchestrations: Drew Krassowski, Erik Aho, Susie Benchasil Seiter, Keith Murray, Sacha Chaban
- Supervising copyist: Ross Deroche
- Score mixer and recorder: Nick Baxter
- Assistant recording engineer: Lewis Jones
- Score recorded studio: Abbey Road Studios
- Assistant scoring mixer: Jay Marcovitz
- Score mixing studio: Igloo Music Studios
- Composer assistant: James Sullivan
- Conductors: Timothy Williams, Gavin Greenaway, Matt Dunkley
- Orchestra leader: Perry Montague-Mason
- Choir: London Voices
- Choir masters: Terry Edwards, Ben Parry
- Choir conductor: Terry Edwards
- Choir: Grace Davidson, Michael Dore, Joanna Goldsmith-Freson
- Orchestra contractor: Isobel Griffiths Ltd.
- Assistant orchestra contractor: Susie Gillis
- Librarian: Jill Streater

== Release ==
The film premiered at the Toronto Animation Arts Festival International on April 22, 2016. It was released in the United States by Open Road Films on April 14, 2017. On June 27, 2017, Universal Pictures Home Entertainment released Spark on video. The film was released in South Korea on April 12, 2018.

== Reception ==
=== Critical response ===
As of October 2022, on Rotten Tomatoes, the film has an approval rating of 13% based on 24 reviews, with an average review score of 3.8/10. As of May 2017 on Metacritic, it had a score of 22 out of 100, based on 6 critics, indicating "generally unfavorable reviews".

=== Box office ===
Spark opened in 365 theaters in North America and grossed $112,352 in its opening weekend, taking in $308 per theater. The film's total theatrical run brought in $891,925 worldwide, making the film a box office bomb.

== See also ==
- List of computer-animated films
- 2016 in film
