= The Wager (1998 film) =

- Directed by: Aaron Woodley
- Written by: Aaron Woodley
- Produced by: Daniel Hill; Eric Novakovics; Aaron Woodley
- Starring: Peter Blais; Barclay Hope; Valerie Boyle
- Cinematography: David Greene
- Edited by: Robert Crossman
- Music by: E.C. Woodley
- Production company: Paulus Productions
- Release date: May 1998 (CFC Worldwide)
- Running time: 19 minutes
- Country: Canada
- Language: English

The Wager is a 1998 Canadian drama short film written and directed by Aaron Woodley. It stars Peter Blais, Barclay Hope, and Valerie Boyle. Denise Cronenberg was one of the film's executive producers.

== Synopsis ==
A dark and humorous suspense drama which begins late one night as Richard (Hope) is entering his apartment. He encounters an odd man (Blais) dressed in his underwear and holding a box. The stranger proposes a series of morbid wagers referring to what may be hiding within. Each one is more disturbing and profound than the previous, and all lead toward a life-or-death gamble and a startling, unexpected conclusion.

== Release ==
The film premiered in May 1998 at the CFC Worldwide Short Film Festival. It was later screened at various Canadian and American film festivals before being broadcast on CBC Television's Canadian Reflections in February 1999.
