= Take Time with Noel Harrison =

- Genre: Variety show
- Presented by: Noel Harrison
- Country of origin: Canada
- Original language: English
- No. of seasons: 2

Production
- Producers: John E. O'Neil; Cy True
- Production locations: Halifax, Nova Scotia, Canada
- Running time: 30 minutes

Original release
- Network: CBC Television
- Release: 19 October 1974 – 15 January 1976

Take Time with Noel Harrison is a Canadian music variety show which aired on CBC Television from 1974 to 1976.

== Premise ==
This program was produced at the CBHT Studios in Halifax, Nova Scotia, featuring British musician Noel Harrison who was living in Nova Scotia since 1972. Episodes were supported by a six-member music group led by John Redmond and including pianist John Roby.

Visiting artists included John Allan Cameron, Shirley Eikhard, Bob Carpenter, Fraser & DeBolt, Tom Gallant, Beverly Glenn-Copeland, Dee Higgins, Tommy Makem, Colleen Peterson, Jack Schechtman, Stringband and Brent Titcomb.

== Scheduling ==
This half-hour program was broadcast on Saturdays in its first season at 6:30 p.m. (Eastern time) from 19 October 1974 to 13 September 1975. The second season was broadcast Thursdays at 7:30 p.m. from 18 September 1975 to 15 January 1976.
