= Patricia Phillips =

Canadian actress and documentary film producer

Patricia Phillips is a Canadian actress and documentary film producer. She is most noted for her performances as Sharon in the 1985 film Bayo, for which she was an ACTRA Award nominee for Best Television Actress at the 15th ACTRA Awards in 1986, and Helen in the St. Lawrence Centre for the Arts' 1985 production of And a Nightingale Sang, for which she received a Dora Mavor Moore Award nomination for Best Leading Actress (General Theatre) at the 1986 Dora Mavor Moore Awards.

She was an ACTRA winner for Best Radio Actress at the 13th ACTRA Awards in 1984 for her performance as Morag Gunn in a 1983 CBC Radio dramatization of Margaret Laurence's novel The Diviners, and a nominee for Best Supporting Actress at the 14th ACTRA Awards in 1985 for her supporting role in The Passion of the Patriots.

She left acting in the 1990s, forming Great North Productions with Tom Radford and her husband Andy Thomson. The company's projects included the television series Destiny Ridge and Jake and the Kid, as well as numerous documentary films. After the firm was acquired by Alliance Atlantis in 2000, Phillips remained with Alliance Atlantis for a number of years as head of documentary production, before returning to acting in small supporting roles in the early 2010s.
