= Professional Association of Canadian Theatres =

Canadian theatre organization

The Professional Association of Canadian Theatres (PACT) is an organization overseeing, promoting, and advocating for the English-speaking professional theatre sector in Canada. It was established in 1976 and is headquartered in Toronto. Its membership consists of more than 100 theatre organizations from every Canadian province, as well as the Yukon Territory.

PACT advocates for the Canadian theatre sector, facilitates collaboration between its members, and negotiates labour agreements on behalf of Canadian theatres. One such agreement is the Canadian Theatre Agreement (CTA), created in negotiation with the Canadian Actor's Equity Association (CAEA), which regulates the terms of contractual engagements between performers employed by PACT member organizations and the organizations themselves. Other agreements exist between PACT and the Associated Designers of Canada, the Playwright's Guild of Canada, and L’Association des professionnels des arts de la scène du Québec (APASQ).

In 2017, PACT, in collaboration with CAEA, launched the Not in Our Space! campaign to combat bullying and harassment in theatre workspaces. The campaign includes a set of standards for artist and theatre staff conduct as well as guidelines for reporting harassment.

== Notable member organizations ==
=== British Columbia ===
- Arts Club Theatre Company (Vancouver)
- Bard on the Beach (Vancouver)
- Belfry Theatre (Victoria)
- Firehall Arts Centre (Vancouver)
- Gateway Theatre (Richmond)

=== Alberta ===
- Alberta Theatre Projects (Calgary)
- Citadel Theatre (Edmonton)

=== Saskatchewan ===
- Globe Theatre (Regina)
- Persephone Theatre (Saskatoon)

=== Manitoba ===
- Royal Manitoba Theatre Centre (Winnipeg)
- Winnipeg Jewish Theatre (Winnipeg)

=== Ontario ===
==== Toronto ====
- Canadian Stage
- Crow's Theatre
- Mirvish Productions
- Soulpepper Theatre Company
- Tarragon Theatre
- The Theatre Centre

==== Outside Toronto ====
- Drayton Entertainment (Various Locations)
- Grand Theatre (London)
- Great Canadian Theatre Company (Ottawa)
- Shaw Festival (Niagara-on-the-Lake)
- Stratford Festival (Stratford)

=== Quebec ===
- Black Theatre Workshop (Montreal)
- Centaur Theatre (Montreal)
- Segal Centre for Performing Arts (Montreal)

=== Atlantic Canada ===
- Neptune Theatre (Halifax, NS)
- Theatre New Brunswick (Fredericton, NB)
- Theatre Newfoundland Labrador (Cow Head, NL)

A complete list of PACT member organizations can be found on the PACT website.
