= Sue LePage =

Canadian set designer and costume designer

- Born: 1951 (age 74–75); Toronto, Ontario, Canada
- Education: University of Guelph
- Occupations: Set designer, costume designer
- Years active: 1973–present

Sue LePage (born 1951) is a Canadian set designer and costume designer based in Toronto. She has designed for over 100 theatre productions including ballet and opera.

She is a two-time Dora Mavor Moore Award recipient and winner of a Sterling Award.

== Life and education ==
LePage was born in and grew up in Toronto.

In 1973, she graduated from University of Guelph where she studied drama.

== Career ==
After graduating university, LePage's first job in the field was as a junior production assistant for a short time at the Stratford Festival. Soon after, she went to Scotland to attend a program affiliated with the Edinburgh Festival.

For nearly 10 years, LePage continued as an assistant at the Stratford Festival while also doing her own design work for smaller theatres.

Her designs have since appeared in many other notable theatres and theatre festivals in Canada: Shaw Festival: Tarragon Theatre, Grand Theatre, Nightwood Theatre, Citadel Theatre, Banff Centre for the Arts, Canadian Stage, National Arts Centre, Soulpepper, Young People's Theatre, Elgin and Winter Garden Theatres, Factory Theatre.

== Awards ==
=== Dora Mavor Moore Awards ===
- Outstanding Set Design — Mid-Size Theatre — Death and the Maiden (1994)
- Outstanding Costume Design — Drama / Comedy — Three Sisters (1992)

=== Other ===
- Sterling Award — August: Osage County (2011)
