= Cliff Cardinal =

Canadian actor and playwright

Cliff Cardinal is a Canadian actor, playwright and songwriter, known for his one-man show The Land Acknowledgement, or As You Like It.

== Early life ==
The son of actress Tantoo Cardinal, he was born on the Pine Ridge Indian Reservation in South Dakota, and grew up in Toronto and Los Angeles as his mother pursued her career in both Canada and the United States. He had early acting roles in productions such as Michael Hollingsworth's The Saskatchewan Rebellion and Kenneth Williams's Three Little Birds, and made his debut as a playwright with Stitch at the 2009 Rubaboo Performance Gala in Edmonton.

== Theatre career ==
In 2011, Stitch was staged at the SummerWorks Theatre Festival, where Cardinal won the Theatre Passe Muraille Emerging Artist Award, and Cara Gee won Best Actress for her performance in the lead role.

He first became widely known in 2012 for his one-man show Huff, which examined the issue of drug and solvent abuse in indigenous communities. Following a February 2016 production of Huff by Native Earth Performing Arts, Cardinal won Dora Mavor Moore Awards for Outstanding New Play, Independent Theatre and Outstanding Male Performance, Independent Theatre, at the 2016 Dora Awards.

After Huff and Stitch were published together in book form, Cardinal was a nominee in the Alternative Format category at the 2018 Indigenous Voices Awards.

In 2019, his play Too Good to Be True, inspired in part by his relationship with his mother, premiered at Toronto's VideoCabaret theatre. It was the first play ever staged by the company in its new Busy St. theatre, and one of the first times the company staged a play by anybody but Hollingsworth and Deanne Taylor. In 2019 and early 2020, he toured the variety show Cliff Cardinal's CBC Special, in which he performed a mixture of short acting monologues, storytelling and music.

== The Land Acknowledgement ==
In 2021, Cardinal debuted Shakespeare's As You Like It: A Radical Retelling at the Crow's Theatre in Toronto. Advertised as an indigenous-themed adaptation of William Shakespeare's As You Like It, the play actually featured no Shakespearean content at all, and instead consisted entirely of Cardinal performing a monologue on Indigenous Canadian political issues through the framework of a satirical land acknowledgement nominally preceding the Shakespeare play that wasn't really being performed. Cardinal later explained that the bait and switch tactic was chosen because he wanted to avoid "preaching to the converted", and instead wanted the monologue to hit harder by virtue of being unexpected and surprising. To that end, he also concluded each show by asking the audience not to reveal the trick to people who had not yet seen the show.

In 2022, Cardinal undertook a national tour of the show, including runs in Vancouver, Edmonton and Peterborough. Cardinal received dual Dora nominations at the 2022 awards, for Best Leading Performer, General Theatre and Best Original Play, General Theatre. The play was also published in book form, and was a shortlisted Trillium Book Award nominee for English prose in 2023.

The play received a new production by Mirvish Productions at the CAA Theatre in 2023, although it was retitled The Land Acknowledgement, or As You Like It as Mirvish did not permit Cardinal to use the "bait and switch" marketing tactic.

The play's print publication won the Governor General's Award for English-language drama at the 2023 Governor General's Awards.
