= Nothing Sacred (play) =

Play by George F. Walker

Nothing Sacred is a play by Canadian playwright George F. Walker, written as a stage adaptation of Ivan Turgenev's 1862 novel Fathers and Sons.

The play received its first production at Toronto, Ontario's CentreStage, in January 1988 under the direction of Bill Glassco. The original cast included Michael Riley as Arkady, Robert Bockstael as Bazarov, David Fox as Nikolai, Richard Monette as Pavel, Peter Blais as Viktor, Diane D'Aquila as Anna and Beverley Cooper as Fedosya. A 1989 production at the National Arts Centre in Ottawa cast Greg Spottiswood as Arkady, with the cast also including Bockstael, Fox, Cooper and Gary Reineke.

The play was published in book form by Coach House Press in 1988. It won the Governor General's Award for English-language drama at the 1988 Governor General's Awards, the 1988 Dora Mavor Moore Award for Outstanding New Play, and the 1989 Floyd S. Chalmers Canadian Play Award. The production also won Dora Mavor Moore Awards for Outstanding Production (Bill Glassco), Outstanding Costume Design (Mary Kerr) and Outstanding Set Design (Mary Kerr). It had garnered nine Dora nominations overall, including acting nods for Riley, D'Aquila and Blais.

It was also one of Walker's most widely produced plays in the United States, with productions in Los Angeles, Chicago, Seattle, San Francisco and Washington, D.C. in the 1988-89 season alone. The Los Angeles production at the Mark Taper Forum included Tom Hulce in its cast; a 1992 production at the Atlantic Theater Company in New York City included Larry Bryggman.

A revival of the play was staged at Toronto's Winter Garden Theatre in 1994, with its cast including Eric Peterson, Sonja Smits, Michael Hogan, Michael McManus, Peter Blais and Patrick Gallagher. This production was later filmed as a television movie, which aired on CBC Television in 1995 with virtually the same cast.
