= Cameron Porteous =

Canadian set and costume designer (born 1937

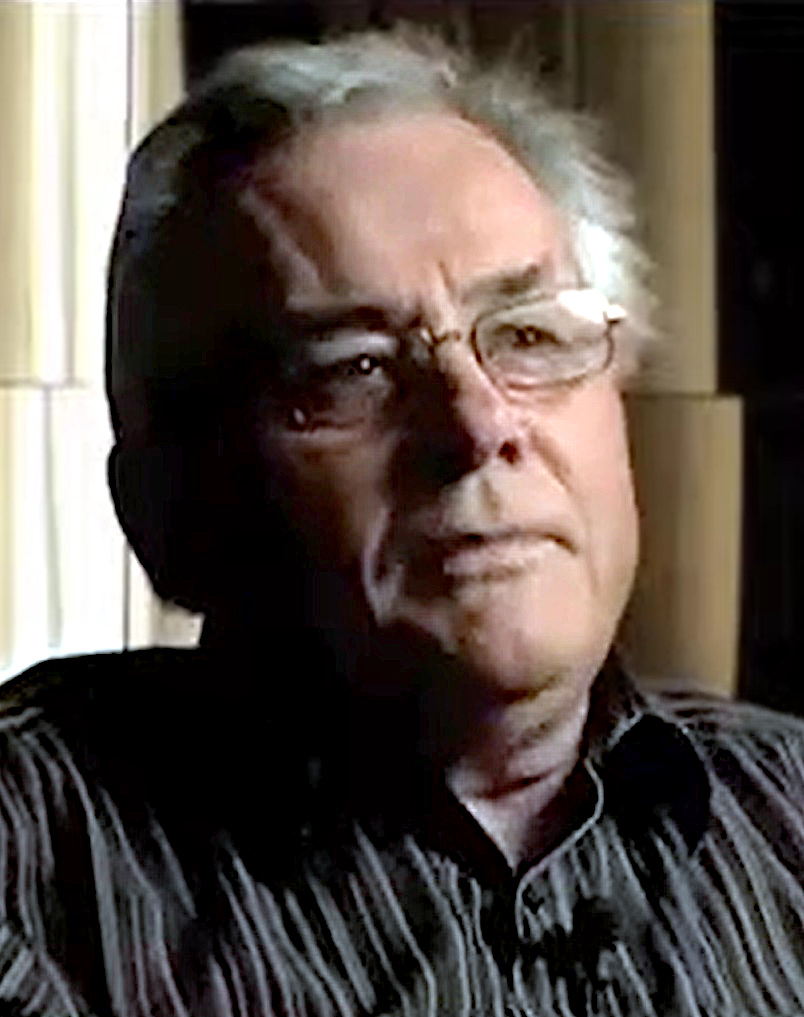
- Porteous in 2009
- Born: John Cameron Porteous; February 2, 1937 (age 89); Rosetown, Saskatchewan, Canada
- Education: Banff School of Fine Arts and Wimbledon College of Arts
- Occupation: Production designer

John Cameron Porteous (born February 2, 1937), better known as Cameron Porteous, is a Canadian set and costume designer.

Porteous served as the head of design at the Shaw Festival in Niagara-on-the-Lake, Ontario, from 1980 to 1997. He is also known for his production designs for films, including the 1992 HBO television drama film Beethoven Lives Upstairs.

== Biography ==
Porteous initially started acting in high school, but was more attracted to scenic and costume design; he completed a degree at the Banff School of Fine Arts and began working in design for television.

Seeking more training for theatrical design, Porteous studied at the Wimbledon College of Arts in London before returning to Canada in 1969. As a student in London, he was exposed to the work of European and British designers such as Richard Negri, Tanya Moiseiwitsch, Joseph Svoboda, and Sean Kenny, and Continental trends became an important influence on his work.

He began a long collaboration with the director Christopher Newton as head of design at the Vancouver Playhouse Theatre Company in 1972.

At the Shaw Festival, Newton and Porteous championed total design, achieving unity by assigning set and costume designs to the same designer. For the Shaw's production of Noël Coward's Cavalcade, the North American premiere of the play, Porteous used a hydraulic turntable to transport actors, props and the elaborate set pieces on- and offstage within seconds, and projections to suggest a variety of settings and time periods.

Porteous has also designed for Tarragon Theatre, the National Arts Centre, the Citadel Theatre, Young People's Theatre, and the Vancouver Opera.

== Honor ==
He has received the Queen's Jubilee Medal for contributions to Canadian theatre.

== Selected production credits ==
- Julius Caesar (Vancouver Playhouse, 1973)
- Cyrano de Bergerac (Shaw Festival, 1982)
- Cavalcade (Shaw Festival, 1985)
- The Madwoman of Chaillot (Shaw Festival, 1985)
- Lord of the Flies (Shaw Festival, 1990)
- The Barber of Seville (Vancouver Opera, 1991)
- Beethoven Lives Upstairs (HBO television drama film, 1992)
- Journey's End (Shaw Festival, 2005)
- Kindertransport (Harold Green Jewish Theatre Company, 2008)
- Barrymore (2011)

== Bibliography ==
- Risking the Void: The Scenography of Cameron Porteous. 2009. Theatre Museum Canada/University of Guelph.
- Siversky, Sandra. "John Cameron Porteous". The Canadian Encyclopedia.
- Nothof, Anne. "Porteous, Cameron". Canadian Theatre Encyclopedia.
