= Khari Wendell McClelland =

American musician and music historian

Khari Wendell McClelland is an American musician and music historian living and working in Vancouver, British Columbia, Canada. He is a member of the gospel trio Sojourners. He is known for his multimedia show, Freedom Singer, which depicts his research into the music of slaves who travelled on the underground railway to Canada.

== Early life ==
McClelland was born and grew up in Detroit, Michigan. He moved to Canada in about 2006.

== Career ==
McClelland joined the gospel trio Sojourners in 2011, replacing founding member Ron Small.

In 2015 McClelland travelled around Canada with CBC's Jodie Martinson, collecting and studying traditional songs and gospel music brought to Canada by fugitive slaves. The trip was the subject of a one-hour documentary for the CBC Television show Absolutely Canadian.

McClelland released his debut solo album, Fleeting is the Time, in 2016.

In 2017, with Martinson and director Andrew Kushnir, he developed a multimedia show, Freedom Singer, showing the results of his research and performing his own versions of songs that he had discovered. The show was performed across Canada in 2017 and 2018.

In 2018 McClelland took over as MC of the Eastside Heart of the City Festival in Vancouver. Also that year he performed as part of the Mad Dogs and Vancouverites concert in Vancouver, and continued to perform with the Sojourners, including a concert with blues musician Jim Byrnes.
