= Aaron Woodley =

Canadian film director

- Born: 1971 (age 54–55); Toronto, Ontario, Canada
- Occupations: Film director, screenwriter
- Years active: 1997–present
- Mother: Denise Cronenberg
- Relatives: David Cronenberg (uncle); Brandon Cronenberg (cousin); Caitlin Cronenberg (cousin)

Aaron Woodley (born 1971) is a Canadian film director and screenwriter.

== Early life ==
Woodley was born in Toronto, Ontario, the son of costume designer Denise Cronenberg and nephew of filmmaker David Cronenberg. He studied animations at Art Gallery of Ontario and later graduate at York University.

== Career ==
Woodley's 1998 short film The Wager won Short Film Award at Austin Film Festival. In 2003, he directed Rhinoceros Eyes in which Michael Pitt starred. A year later, he directed Lee Daniels-produced film Tennessee which starred singer and actress Mariah Carey.

In 2015, Variety announced that Woodley would direct the animated film Spark featuring the voices of Jessica Biel and Susan Sarandon.

In 2019, Woodley was appointed as the director of network brands of Knowledge Network.

== Filmography ==
As director
Year	Title	Notes
1998	The Wager	Also writer and producer
2003	Rhinoceros Eyes	Writer and director; also acted in the role of "Betty Bumcakes"
2008	Tennessee	
2008	Toronto Stories	Segment: "Shoelaces"
2010	Glenn Martin, DDS	TV series (5 episodes)
2011	The Entitled	
2012	Curious and Unusual Deaths	TV series (13 episodes)
2016	Spark	Also writer and voice of Floyd
2019	Arctic Dogs	Also writer and voice of Puffins
