= Michael Levine (set designer) =

Canadian set designer (born 1961)

- Born: November 5, 1960 (age 66); Toronto, Ontario, Canada
- Occupation: Set designer

Michael Levine (born 5 November 1960) is a Canadian set designer. He is best known for his work in opera, including the scenic design for the Canadian Opera Company's 2006 production of Wagner's Ring Cycle, directed by Atom Egoyan. Levine has also designed productions for Theatre Passe Muraille, Lyric Opera of Chicago, Vienna State Opera, English National Opera, Teatro alla Scala, Dutch National Opera, Royal Shakespeare Company, the Royal Opera House, and the National Theatre.

== Biography ==
Born in Toronto, Levine attended Thornton Hall, where he received a grounding in the history and principles of art. He originally hoped to be a painter and completed a foundational year at the Ontario College of Art, but became interested in designing for the theatre while working on friends' productions. After completing the year, he moved to study theatre design at Central St. Martins College of Art and Design in London, England, and obtained his degree in 1981. He was hired as resident designer at the Glasgow Citizen's Theatre in Glasgow, Scotland, and became adept at designing on a small budget and within a limited timeframe. Levine returned to Canada after one season in Glasgow, designing for the Tarragon Theatre production of Uncle Vanya and for the Shaw Festival. Levine gained notoriety for his bold, grotesque design for the CentreStage Company's production of Spring Awakening, directed by Derek Goldby, and was hired by Lotfi Mansouri to design two productions for the Canadian Opera Company in 1986.

Levine's designs result from a collaborative creative process with directors, choreographers and performers, as well as a close reading of the text and music of a given play or opera. He frequently collaborates with Canadian opera director Robert Carsen, with whom he designed the Grand Théâtre de Genève's production of Mefistofele and The Magic Flute for the Opera National de Paris, and also with director Robert Lepage. His opera designs often draw on the physicality of the chorus members, who become part of the scenography, as in his design for Oedipus Rex. Levine's work also frequently incorporates outsize elements such as a huge metal ship for The Flying Dutchman with the English National Opera.

Outside his opera work, he has worked extensively with English theatre director Simon McBurney and his company Complicité on productions such as Nemonic, The Elephant Vanishes, A Disappearing Number and The Encounter.

Levine is a member of the Associated Designers of Canada, and his designs were featured as part of the Canadian delegation to the Prague Quadrennial in 1999.

== Stage productions (selected) ==
- Uncle Vanya (Tarragon Theatre) - 1985
- The Women (Shaw Festival) - 1985
- Mefistofele (San Francisco Opera/Lyric Opera of Chicago/Geneva Opera) - 1988
- A Midsummer Night's Dream (National Theatre) - 1992
- Bluebeard's Castle and Erwartung (Edinburgh Festival) - 1993 - Edinburgh Festival Drama and Music Award
- La bohème (Flanders Opera) - 1994
- Oedipus Rex (Canadian Opera Company) - 1998
- The Tales of Hoffmann (Paris Opera) - 2002
- Der Ring des Nibelungen (Canadian Opera Company) - 2006
- A Dog's Heart (DNO) - 2010
- The Little Prince (National Ballet of Canada) - 2016

== Accolades ==
- 1981: Chevalier des Arts et Lettres in France.
- 1991: Critics Award, France, (Benjamin Britten's A Midsummer Night's Dream)
- 1993: Edinburgh Festival Drama and Music Award (Bluebeard's Castle and Erwartung)
- 1997: Toronto Arts Award
- 1997: Gemini Award for September Songs: The Music of Kurt Weill
- 2011: Distinguished Artist Award from the International Society for the Performing Arts (ISPA)
- 2015: The Canada Council for the Arts' Walter Carsen Prize for Excellence in the Performing Arts
- 2016: Dora Mavor Moore Award (Outstanding Scenic Design) for Siegfried at the Canadian Opera Company

== Bibliography ==
Kareda, Urjo. "Architect of Dreams." Canadian Art, 1994, pp. 100–107.

Lewsen, Simon. "Pulling Strings ." The Walrus, 26 June 2016, thewalrus.ca/pulling-strings/.

"Michael Levine." National Ballet of Canada, national.ballet.ca/Meet/Creative-Team/Michael-Levine?.

Rewa, Natalie, and Bridget Cauthery. "Michael Levine." The Canadian Encyclopedia, Historica Canada, 2 Dec. 2012, www.thecanadianencyclopedia.ca/en/article/michael-levine/. Accessed 31 May 2017.

== See also ==
- Canadian Opera Company
- Robert Carsen
- Simon McBurney
