= Noel Harrison =

English actor and singer (1934–2013)

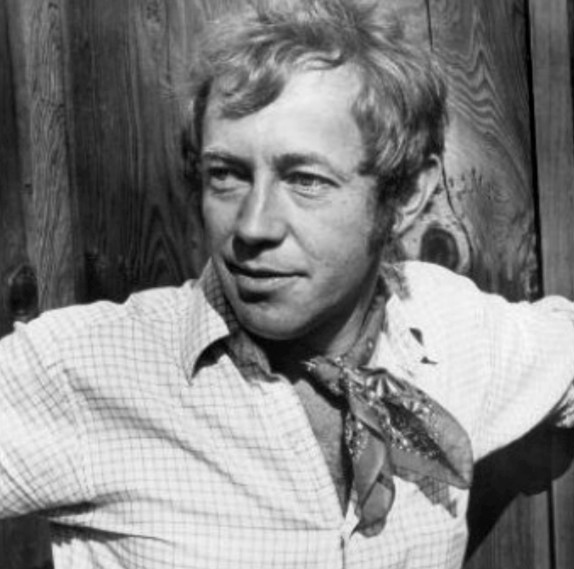
- Harrison in 1972
- Born: Noel John Christopher Harrison; 29 January 1934; Kensington, London, England
- Died: 19 October 2013 (aged 79); Exeter, Devon, England
- Occupations: Actor, singer
- Years active: 1960–2011
- Spouses: Sara Lee Eberts Tufnell (m. 1959; div. 1969) Margaret Benson (m. 1972; div. 1989) Lori Chapman (m. 1991)
- Children: 5, including Cathryn
- Parents: Rex Harrison; Ethel Margery Noel Collette-Thomas
- Relatives: Carey Harrison (paternal half-brother); Leslie Law (son-in-law)

Noel John Christopher Harrison (29 January 1934 – 19 October 2013) was an English actor and singer. In the 1950s, he was a member of the British Olympic skiing team. In 1968, Harrison had a top-10 hit in the UK Singles Chart with "The Windmills of Your Mind". He was the son of actor Rex Harrison.

== Early life ==
Harrison was born on 29 January 1934 in Kensington, London. His mother, Ethel Margery Noel Collette-Thomas, was the first of Rex Harrison's six wives; they divorced in 1942. Ethel and her cousin Richard Michael Collette Thomas (later a lieutenant-colonel killed in action in 1944, in France) were brought up together by their grandparents, Major John Cyril Collette-Thomas and Jessie Maud Scott-Brown, in Bude, North Cornwall. As a child, he attended Sunningdale School, where his father had also been a pupil. When he was 15, Ethel took young Noel out of school at Radley to live in the Swiss Alps.

Harrison never returned to school and began ski-racing. He joined the Ipswich repertory theatre group and taught himself guitar, but his main interest and most of his spare time was spent skiing. At an early age, he was a member of the British ski team, becoming its first giant-slalom champion in 1953, and representing Great Britain at the 1952 Winter Olympics in Oslo, Norway, and at the 1956 Winter Olympics in Cortina d'Ampezzo, Italy.

Harrison undertook National Service and, after leaving the army in the 1950s, toyed with the idea of becoming a journalist, but instead, concentrated on his guitar. His early break came when he took a regular part in the BBC Television programme Tonight, as part of a team who sang the day's news in a calypso style.

When Harrison was 20, he started playing professionally, around the tables in a Greek restaurant in London. He also made a living playing in bars and nightclubs all over Europe, including appearances at the Blue Angel nightclub in Mayfair, London, where one show was recorded for a live album.

== Move to the United States ==
After appearing in small roles in British films such as The Best of Enemies (1961), Hot Enough for June (1964) and Where the Spies Are (1965) Harrison left for the United States in 1965, working as a nightclub entertainer at such venues as the Hungry I in San Francisco, and at the Persian Room in New York City. Thanks to his managers Bob Chartoff and Irwin Winkler, who went on to produce the Rocky films, he had a record reach the charts. The track was "A Young Girl", written by Charles Aznavour. In the 1966–67 television season he appeared as Mark Slate in 29 episodes of the NBC series The Girl from U.N.C.L.E. as the costar of Stefanie Powers (April Dancer). A year earlier, Norman Fell originated his Mark Slate character on the original U.N.C.L.E. series, The Man from U.N.C.L.E. in a second-season episode titled "The Galatea Affair". In 1968, Harrison appeared on an episode of To Tell the Truth in which the panel had to figure out which of three women was Harrison's then-wife Sara.

"Young Girl" was included as one of the tracks on Harrison's debut album, Noel Harrison, in 1966. Two years later, he recorded "The Windmills of Your Mind", the theme tune from the film The Thomas Crown Affair, which won the Academy Award for Best Original Song in 1968, and was also a Top 10 hit in the UK Singles Chart. Despite the song winning the 1968 Oscar for best original song, Harrison did not sing it at the ceremony. Instead his place was taken by Jose Feliciano. The change was made because he was working on the film, Take A Girl Like You in England, with Oliver Reed and Hayley Mills. Coincidentally, his father had sung the Oscar-winning song ("Talk to the Animals") only the previous year (1967).

The television series, plus the Top 40 record, landed Harrison a recording contract with Reprise, who released three of his albums, Collage, Santa Monica Pier and The Great Electric Experiment Is Over. Collage reached #135 in the United States Billboard 200 chart. He also toured with the Beach Boys, and Sonny and Cher, appeared on The Ed Sullivan Show, featured on a music program, Hullabaloo and appeared on The Tonight Show Starring Johnny Carson.

In 1968, Harrison played the male lead in The Fantasticks, in touring theatres in the round, including the Cape Cod Melody Tent in Hyannis, Massachusetts. In 1970, he played the male lead role in "Blithe Spirit" at The Cape Playhouse in Dennis, MA and returned in 1983 for the lead male role in "The Housekeeper".

== Move to Canada ==
In 1972, Harrison left the United States for Nova Scotia, settling in rural Mount Hanley. He bought a farmhouse with 320 acres of farmland, and from there he commuted to Halifax where he hosted a show called Take Time for CBC Television. In winter 1974, the wood stove caught fire and his house burned down, inspiring him to write the humorous song, "The Middleton Fire Brigade", which appeared on his 1979 album Mount Hanley Song. He subsequently built a new house from scratch with no electricity, inspired by the fashionable pioneers Helen and Scott Nearing and their self-help bible, Living the Good Life.

== Touring shows ==
During the 1970s, Harrison toured the United States in productions of Camelot and The Sound of Music. He also played Henry Higgins in My Fair Lady, the part first performed by his father in the musical's original stage production and film version. Other touring roles included King Arthur in Camelot, Baron von Trapp in The Sound of Music, Don Quixote in Man of La Mancha, Brian Runicles in No Sex Please, We're British and Lloyd Dallas in Noises Off.

He later began acting again, appearing in the cinema films Power, and Déjà Vu. An admirer of Jacques Brel, Harrison created a one-man musical, Adieu, Jacques, and in 2002 released an album of songs from the show.

== Return to the United Kingdom ==
In 2004, Harrison returned to the United Kingdom, relocating his home to the county of Devon. He continued to sing, appearing in occasional concerts to finance the recording and release of his self-produced albums, such as Hold Back Time. A compilation album of his work titled Life Is a Dream was released by the American 'Reprise' record label in 2003, and his debut album, Noel Harrison, was re-released in 2008. In 2010, he recorded a new album, From the Sublime to the Ridiculous!. The record was made as part of the Internet event, The RPM Challenge, which challenged musicians to record a new album from scratch during the month of February.

In June 2011, Harrison played Glastonbury Festival's "Spirit of '71" stage, marking 40 years since his appearance at the second staging of the festival. The performance was televised by the British Broadcasting Corporation, including a backstage acoustic version of the song "The Windmills of Your Mind".

== Personal life ==
Harrison was married three times. In 1959, he married Sara Lee Eberts Tufnell, with whom he had three children: Cathryn, Simon, and Harriet. Their marriage ended in divorce in 1969. His second marriage was in 1972 to Margaret Benson. The couple had two children, Chloe and Will, and later divorced in 1989. Harrison's final marriage was in 1991 to Lori Chapman, to whom he remained married until his death in 2013.

Harrison died in hospital after suffering a heart attack at his Devon home, several hours after performing a concert locally on the evening of 19 October 2013.

== Discography ==
=== Albums ===
- Noel Harrison at the Blue Angel (1960)
- Noel Harrison at UnMusic (1960)
- Noel Harrison (1966)
- Collage (1967)
- Santa Monica Pier (1968)
- The Great Electric Experiment Is Over (1969) Produced by Peter Pilalfian and arranged by Luiz Henrique Rosa
- The World of Noel Harrison (1969 — compilation)
- Mount Hanley Song (1979)
- Live From Boulevard Music (2002 — live album recorded in the United States)
- Adieu, Jacques (2002 — music from the show, sung in French)
- Hold Back Time (2003)
- Life Is a Dream (2003 compilation)
- From the Sublime to the Ridiculous (2010)

=== Singles ===
Year	Single	Peak chart positions			Album
Year	Single	UK	CAN	US	Album
1965	"A Young Girl (Of Sixteen)"	—	5	51	Noel Harrison
1967	"Suzanne"	—	—	56	Collage
1969	"The Windmills of Your Mind"	8	—	—	The Thomas Crown Affair (soundtrack)
"—" denotes releases that did not chart

== Filmography ==
Year	Title	Role	Notes
1961	The Best of Enemies	Lt. Hilary	
1964	Hot Enough for June	Johnnie	
1965	The Amorous Adventures of Moll Flanders	Second Mohock	
1966	Where the Spies Are	Jackson	
1968	To Tell the Truth	Himself	
1970	Take a Girl Like You	Julian Ormerod	
1986	Power	Leonard Thompson	
1997	Déjà Vu	John Stoner	
1999	The Murder in China Basin	George Guest	(final film role)
