= Don Hannah =

Canadian playwright and novelist

Don Hannah is a Canadian playwright and novelist. He won a Floyd S. Chalmers Canadian Play Award for his first play, The Wedding Script. He was born in Shediac, New Brunswick.

He has been playwright in residence at Tarragon Theatre, the Canadian Stage Company, the NotaBle Acts Theatre Festival, and was the inaugural Lee Playwright-in-Residence at the University of Alberta. His other residencies include the University of New Brunswick, the Yukon Public Library, and Green College, University of British Columbia. He is a founding member of PARC, the Playwrights Atlantic Resource Centre, and for five years was associate dramaturg at the Banff Centre Playwrights Colony. He had also worked as a dramaturg for Vancouver's Playwrights Theatre Centre. His novel Ragged Islands won the Thomas Head Raddall Award.

In 2012 his play The Cave Painter received the Carol Bolt award.

His play, Resident Aliens, opened at Theatre New Brunswick in 2023.

== Works ==
=== Plays ===
==== Full length ====
- The Wedding Script (1986)
- Rubber Dolly (1986)
- In the Lobster Capital of the World (1988)
- Love Jive (1989) with composer David Sereda
- Siren Song (1990) with composer David Sereda
- The Wooden Hill (1994)
- Running Far Back (1994)
- Fathers and Sons (1998)
- While We're Young (2008)
- There is a Land of Pure Delight (2008)
- The Woodcutter (2010)
- The Cave Painter (2011)
- Resident Aliens (2023)

==== Shorts ====
- Firing Francine (1985)
- Undersea (1988)
- The Wall in the Garden (1989)
- Wedlock (1990)

=== Opera ===
- Facing South (2003) with composer Linda C. Smith

=== Novels ===
- The Wise and Foolish Virgins (1998)
- Ragged Islands (2007)
