= Peter Blais =

Canadian actor

Peter Blais (born 1949) is a Canadian actor, best known for his frequent roles in the plays of George F. Walker.

== Background ==
A native of Ottawa, Ontario, Blais is the grandson of John Peter Macmillan, a civil engineer who played a key role in establishing Cape Breton Highlands National Park. He attended Carleton University and joined the campus drama society, where he met Dan Aykroyd. They performed together in several amateur productions during the 1960s.

Through the early 1970s he continued to have stage acting roles, while also working as a textile artist and theatrical costume and set designer, most notably on a 1977 production of King Lear for Halifax's Neptune Theatre.

He was regularly involved in productions of Walker's plays, both as an actor and as a designer. He was additionally the designer of the original Arthur Ellis Award statuette for the Crime Writers of Canada.

== Acting career ==
His performances in Walker's plays included Beyond Mozambique (1978), Rumours of Our Death (1980), Theatre of the Film Noir (1981), Criminals in Love (1984), Better Living (1987), Zastrozzi, The Master of Discipline, Beautiful City (1987), Nothing Sacred (1988), and Love and Anger (1989). By the time of Love and Anger, Blais had a reputation as "the quintessential Walker actor", to the point that Walker wrote Love and Anger specifically for Blais to play the lead.

He did not appear in the original cast of Escape from Happiness, although he designed the sets, and subsequently stepped into the role of Rolly Moore after Eric Peterson departed the cast.

His other stage roles included productions of The Lark (1980), Glengarry Glen Ross (1986) and The Nerd (1988).

He has also had supporting and guest roles in film and television, most prominently recurring roles as Lennox Cooper in PSI Factor and Geoff/Parson Hubbard in Made in Canada.

In the late 1990s he moved to Nova Scotia, where he became a partner with artist Tom Alway in the Maritime Painted Saltbox Gallery in Petite Riviere, although he continued to appear on stage in Halifax and in series television in Toronto and Halifax until 2005.

== Awards ==
He has been a two-time Dora Mavor Moore Award nominee, receiving nods for Best Leading Actor, General Theatre at the 1985 Dora Mavor Moore Awards for Criminals in Love, and Best Supporting Actor, General Theatre at the 1988 Dora Mavor Moore Awards for Nothing Sacred.

He won a Golden Sheaf Award for Best Performance - Male at the 1999 Yorkton Film Festival for The Wager.

He received a Gemini Award nomination for Best Supporting Actor in a Drama Program or Series at the 14th Gemini Awards in 1999, for his work in PSI Factor.

== Partial filmography ==
=== Films ===
- Baby on Board (1992) — Bald Man
- The Wager (1998) — Victor
- Snow Angels (2007) — Mr. Eisenstat

=== Made-for-television films ===
- Trudeau (2002) — McIlwraith
- Plain Truth (2004) — Dr. Ziegler
- Trudeau II: Maverick in the Making (2005) — Professor Émilken Caron

=== Television ===
- Faerie Tale Theatre (1 episode) (1985) — Julius Caesar Rat
- Star Wars: Ewoks (1985)— Additional Voices
- The Ray Bradbury Theater (Skeleton) (1988) — Munigant
- War of the Worlds (1 episode) (1989) — Ralph
- Forever Knight (Crazy Love) (1995) — Barlow
- PSI Factor: Chronicles of the Paranormal (21 episodes) (1996–1999) — Lennox "L.Q." Cooper
- TekWar (Redemption) (1996) — Jonas La Salle (1 episode, 1996)
- Made in Canada (1998-2003) — Geoff (12 episodes)
- Beach Girls (TV mini-series) (2005) — Judge
