= Rhinoceros Eyes =

- Film poster
- Directed by: Aaron Woodley
- Written by: Aaron Woodley
- Produced by: Tom Gruenberg; Eva Kolodner
- Starring: Michael Pitt; Paige Turco; Jackie Burroughs; Nadia Litz; Alexis Dziena
- Cinematography: David Greene
- Edited by: Julie Carr; Robert Crossman
- Music by: John Cale
- Release date: September 6, 2003
- Running time: 92 minutes
- Countries: United States; Canada
- Language: English

Rhinoceros Eyes is a 2003 American-Canadian drama film written and directed by Aaron Woodley. It was awarded the Discovery Award at the 2003 Toronto International Film Festival.

== Plot ==
Chep is a reclusive, awkward young man who lives in a prop warehouse. He becomes infatuated with Fran, a set designer who asks him to get her various esoteric items for the movie she's working on. Chep loses his already tenuous grip on reality as he resorts to increasingly unhinged methods to procure these props for her, ending up with detective Phil Barbara on his trail.

== Cast ==
- Michael Pitt as Chep
- Paige Turco as Fran
- Gale Harold as Phil Barbara
- Matt Servitto as Bundy
- James Allodi as Hamish
- Victor Ertmanis as Sweets
- Nadia Litz as Ann
