= Iron Road (opera) =

2001 opera by Chan Ka Nin

Iron Road is an opera in two acts written by the award-winning Canadian composer Chan Ka Nin with a libretto by Mark Brownell and Cantonese translations by George K. Wong. The opera was produced and premiered by Tapestry New Opera Works at the Elgin Theatre in Toronto in 2001 under the direction of Tom Diamond, with Zhu Ge Zeng portraying the lead role. The composition features a forty-two member cast, thirty-seven member orchestra, and recounts the story of a young Chinese woman in the late nineteenth century who disguises herself as a man and emigrates to Canada in search of her father.

== Historical context ==
Chan's opera takes place in late nineteenth century British Columbia at a point of great political friction. John A. Macdonald, Canada's first Prime Minister, took office in 1867, and as part of his political goals, endeavoured to unite the vast landscapes of Canada. From Macdonald's quest for unification evolved the development of a transcontinental railway system, later the Canadian Pacific Railway. This railway would construct a physical means of connection from Coast to Coast, allowing for greater political, social and economic regularity. This pursuit would prove difficult considering the country's rugged landscape, varying political sentiments regarding unification, and the onslaught of foreign labourer immigration, among other factors.

Coinciding this political tension was social unrest in the Guangdong Province of Southern China. Since the time of the Tang dynasty (618–907 CE), inhabitants of the Canton region had been regarded as inferior among the elite, Northern Chinese culture. Subjugation to foreign rule had been long a determinant of the social atmosphere in the province. Around the time of Canada's Confederation, the Cantonese suffered as a result the First and Second Opium Wars, which severely damaged the economic conditions of Guangdong, forcing formerly-employable workers into poverty and causing general strife. After the wars, emigration to Gum San (金山), or "Gold Mountain" (San Francisco) expanded as a result of the Gold Rush, and many men left illegally for Canada in search of employment in the land they believed would provide their families financial freedom. A large number arrived in Vancouver to work on building the country's developing railway system.

Led by Andrew Onderdonk, the first Chinese labourers began to work on the Canadian Pacific Railway 14 May 1880. Canadians were generally suspicious of these immigrant labourers. Many argued citizens would lose labour opportunities from the Chinese, who they believed had no long-term investment in their lives in Canada as they had often come without their wives or children. However, Onderdonk supported this immigrant labour as he had needed approximately ten thousand labourers to complete the railway; at the time, only about thirty-five thousand inhabitants of British Columbia were of European descent. Macdonald was especially supportive of Chinese labour for he understood his goals for political unification would not be achieved without them, saying "[i]t is simply a question of alternatives: either you must have this labour or you can't have the railway." Many of these labourers would work in the Frasier River Valley, one of the most difficult areas of terrain to surmount. Conditions working the railway were poor and Chinese labourers made no more than $1 per day doing the most dangerous work. This is the environment in which Chan would set his opera.

== Composition process ==
Chan began constructing the idea for an opera in 1990. He says he is uncertain of the moment that sparked his inspiration for the opera, but that its development partially evolved from a conversation he had had with a member of the Council of Chinese Canadians choir, which he directed. The chorister advised him that many years ago Chinese women had not been granted the right to immigrate to Canada. Chan was intrigued by this idea and began to research the subject further. After finding that women were in fact barred from emigrating, he concluded that the main character would be a woman disguised as a man. Images of The Last Spike provided the inspiration for the opera's background, which would "naturally" be set among the Canadian Pacific Railway. This background would be the "bridge to relate [his] fictional story to the Canadian public."

Later, it was established his heroine would emigrate to Canada alone in search of her father. However, Chan had been struggling with the likelihood of such a scenario in the late nineteenth century. By chance, the composer encountered an article describing a Norwegian ship, Hebe, upon which 265 Cantonese immigrants had arrived from Hong Kong; one of them was a young woman. This finding verified the plausibility of Chan's emerging storyline, allowing for its development.

Chan's younger brother, Edmond, would be the project's first librettist. The choice of Edmond as librettist seemed natural as he had graduated from Ryerson College Film School with a degree in English and had had experience writing screenplays. The composer admits he had not been exceptionally close to his brother, as he had been studying at university during Edmond's teenage years. This collaboration offered an opportunity for reconnection. For a year, the two collaborated, but both Tapestry New Opera Works and Chan agreed a convincing storyline was not developing, and Edmond was let go.

The project hired five other writers before establishing its final librettist, Mark Brownell, in 1997. In February of that year, Chan and Brownell met at Tapestry New Opera Works's Composer-Librettist Laboratory, an event which brings together composers and librettists in order to establish working relationships. Their first meeting would be brief, and the production of Iron Road paused soon thereafter. Three months later, Chan decided to approach Brownell privately. This time, their composer-librettist collaboration was successful and Tapestry New Opera Works continued with Iron Road's production. Chan credits each librettist as having contributed something meaningful to the project, but says that Brownell was able to construct a story which balanced its conveyance of "human relationships and historical events."

The final years leading to its première saw multiple workshops. The libretto was completed by March 1998, but there remained much editing of the music, especially that of the final scene. During the project's final stages, translator George K. Wong would join the team in 1999, and in 2000, the famous Canadian director, Tom Diamond, was commissioned by Tapestry. Chan accredits much of the opera's integration of traditional Chinese symbols, like The Five Elements, the dragon dance and traditional familial relationships to Tom Diamond. In 2001, after eleven years of research, development, workshops and composition, Chan's opera was premiered in Toronto.

== Roles ==
Roles, voice types, premiere cast
Role	Voice type	Premiere cast, April 19, 2001 Conductor: Wayne Strongman
Lai Gwan, young Chinese woman, emigrates to Canada	soprano	Zhu Ge Zeng
Manli, Lai Gwan's father	bass-baritone	Zheng Zhou
James Nichol, a railway engineer	tenor	Stuart Howe
Ama, Lai Gwan's mother	alto	Grace Chan
Ah Lum, worker	tenor or bass	Henry Li
Ah Charn, worker	tenor or bass	Jovanni Sy
Sir John A. Macdonald, Prime Minister	baritone	Curtis Sullivan
Donald Smith, prominent businessman	high baritone	Martin Houtman
Herder	tenor	Brian Duÿn
SATB chorus, TB chorus

== Instrumentation ==
The instrumentation is:

- Flute 1/dizi, flute 2/piccolo, oboe, English Horn, clarinet in B♭/in A/in E♭, clarinet 2/bass clarinet in B♭, bassoon 1, bassoon 2/contra bassoon
- 4 Horns, 2 trumpets in C, trombone 1, trombone 2/bass trombone, tuba
- Erhu, guzheng, yangqin
- Percussion (minimum 2 players), harpsichord/celesta/(keyboard), harp
- Violin 1, violin 2, viola, cello, double bass

== Synopsis ==
=== Prologue ===
Iron Road opens in 1880s Guangdong Province, China. Lai Gwan attends to her mother, Ama, who is on her deathbed. As the mother dies, she gives Lai Gwan her wedding gown, a final token of love, and advises she go to Gum San in search of her father, who left years ago to find work in Canada.

=== Act 1 ===
Lai Gwan disguises herself as a man and boards a ship for Canada. Meanwhile, Manli, an emigrant worker, has become a powerful bookman in charge of hiring cheap Chinese labour. Upon Lai Gwan's arrival, the father and daughter meet, but do not recognize each other. Lai Gwan's rebellious spirit provokes Manli, and she is ordered to work the dangerous job of planting dynamite suspended from a rock face. Later, Lai Gwan is bathing in a stream when Nichol, a white railroad engineer, enters and realizes she is truly a woman. Lai Gwan begs Nichol to protect her identity. Suddenly, Manli enters and orders she return to work immediately.

The following day, a procession of Chinese workers ushers in the body of yet another dead comrade; Lai Gwan leads the procession. The workers blame Nichol for the death and he resolves to protect Lai Gwan. The labourers gather and discuss their longing for home, poor working conditions and possible murder of the white workers. Lai Gwan advises they protest peacefully by withholding their labour. Manli becomes aware of their protest and blames Lai Gwan, ordering she be hanged at once. However, Nichol defends her, addressing Manli by his first name. Lai Gwan realizes the bookman is her father and confesses.

=== Act 2 ===
Lai Gwan is banished from work. In the morning, Manli finds his daughter and the two argue. Lai Gwan reveals her mother's death and Manli becomes overwhelmed by guilt. Defeated, he heads toward the mountain with dynamite. Lai Gwan and Nichol meet, rushing to the tunnel where her father has gone, but they become trapped as an explosion that collapses the cave. As Nichol lays dying, they profess their love. Nichol dies; later, Manli is found alive.

A few years later, workers hear a train arriving from the east; the railroad is complete. Donald Smith enters and strikes the final stake at Eagle's pass. Afterward, Manli and Lai Gwan perform funeral rituals for the dead, by which the spirits bless them and they are to live together in peace.

== Cross-cultural elements ==
Much of the thematic content in Iron Road draws on Chinese popular religion, a mix of Buddhism, Confucianism and Taoism. These elements are brought out through character, plot, and the music itself, among others. In the Iron Road study guide, Chan explains each of the opera's characters correspond with an element of Chinese cosmology: Water (Séui), Fire (Fó), Earth (Tóu), Metal (Gam) and Wood (Muhk). The relationships between these elements can be harmonious or discordant. The study guide states directly that Lai Gwan corresponds with the element of Water, while Manli is fire—two elements which traditionally conflict each other.

The elements yin and yang, the two basic forces that represent the contrary, but interdependent elements of the natural world, are exemplified in Chan's juxtaposition of Eastern and Western features. Relationships between husband and wife, master and worker, and father and daughter reveal these traditional elements more deeply. There are many scenes in which both yin and yang are presented, including Prologue — The New World, in which Ama and Lai Gwan embody divergent but dependent manifestations of their role as a woman in traditional Chinese society. Ama, a traditional Chinese female character, assumes her societal role passively, while Lai Gwan, who is also traditional, accepts her role more actively. Juxtaposition of Eastern and Western elements are found especially in the opera's orchestration, where Chan employs both Eastern and Western instrumentation. His orchestra includes more traditional instruments like violins, trumpets and horns, while also incorporating erhu, guzheng and yangqin, and many Chinese auxiliary percussion instruments. Certain Chinese instruments are employed especially when supporting the voice of a Cantonese character, whose melodies are often set to the pentatonic mode. Chan thought this setting "...seemed to be a natural consequence of the speeches ... these words ... tend to form the pentatonic scales." Likewise, melodies sung by the white characters are sometimes built on Irish folk and work songs, allowing for the emphasis of Taoist dualism, whose influence stems from Chinese culture.

== Critical reception ==
Since its première in 2001, Iron Road has received mostly positive reviews, praising its bicultural themes, historical commentary, and dichotomous musicality. William Litter of the Toronto Star proclaimed the opera was a "score for multiculturalism", suggesting that if Canada's archetypical opera, Louis Riel is representative of Canadian biculturalism, Iron Road, then, illustrates multiculturalism in today's Canada. John Coulbourn of the Toronto Sun awarded the opera five out of five stars, "On golden rails!", for its historical narrative and unique fusion of Eastern and Western sounds. Tamara Bernstein of the National Post, however, found Chan's love story insufficiently believable and suggested heightened musical drama would have been welcome in scenes involving death. Still, she compliments Chan's aesthetic, which she describes as "colourful and tonal yet not cartoonish."

== Awards ==
The cast of Iron Road won much funding and awards for its production in 2001. The opera was commissioned by the Canada Council, Ontario Arts Council, Canadian Broadcasting Corporation, Toronto Arts Council, Laidlaw Foundation, Canada Council for the Arts-Millennium Arts Fund, The Esther Gelber Development Fund, J.P. Pickell Foundation, and The Lila Wallace Reader's Digest/Opera for a New America. The production received $250,000 from the Canada Council alone, the organization's largest arts grant. In 2001, the opera won the Dora Mavor Moore Award for Outstanding Musical.

== Notes ==
=== Sources ===
- Berton, Pierre (1971). The Last Spike: The Great Railway, 1881–1885. Toronto: McLellan and Stewart. ISBN 0385658419.
- Chan, Anthony B. (1983). Gold Mountain: The Chinese in the New World. Vancouver: New Star Books. ISBN 0919573002.
- Chan, Ka Nin (2001). Iron Road. Toronto: Canadian Music Centre.
- Hung, Ya Lin (2004). Chan Ka Nin's 'Iron Road': Chinese Elements in a Canadian Opera (Master's thesis). University of Victoria.
