= Théâtre français de Toronto =

- Interactive map of Théâtre français de Toronto
- Address: 21 College Street; Toronto, Ontario; Canada

Construction
- Opened: 1967

Website
- https://www.theatrefrancais.com

Théâtre français de Toronto (TfT) is a French-language theatre company presenting classical repertoire, contemporary works, and original creations in Ontario, Canada, since 1967. It is the oldest continuously operating professional francophone theatre company in Toronto. The company has been a registered charity with the Canadian Revenue Agency since 1979.

Traditionally associated with the Berkeley Street Theatre, the company now presents productions at several venues across Toronto.

== History ==
The company was founded in 1967 under the name Théâtre du P’tit Bonheur, the title of its first production. In 1970, the Toronto-based francophone company appointed its first artistic director, John Van Burek, and began a significant collaboration with Québécois playwright Michel Tremblay.

In 1987, the company was renamed Théâtre français de Toronto. In 1992, Diana Leblanc became the company's artistic director. In 1997, Guy Mignault took over the role; his production of the musical C’était un p’tit Bonheur won a Dora Award in 1998.

In 2004, the company began participating in the educational writing program Les Zurbains, an initiative of Théâtre Le Clou from Montréal. In 2005, the company introduced English surtitles to make its productions accessible to a broader audience.

The company's 2006 production of Molière’s L’Avare received the Masque Award for Best Franco-Canadian Production. The company celebrated its 40th anniversary in 2007 under the patronage of Governor General Michaëlle Jean. In 2008, it established the Centre for Creation, a dedicated artistic development and rehearsal space.

In 2009–2010, TfT began a major collaboration with Ottawa’s Théâtre La Catapulte. This partnership resulted in several award-winning productions, including Les Médecins de Molière (2010), which won four Prix Rideau Awards including Best Production of the Year, and Zone by Marcel Dubé (2012), which won three Prix Rideau Awards including Best Production of the Year.

In 2011, the company launched Les Zinspirés, an educational and artistic initiative inspired by Les Zurbains. The project invites students from French-language schools to write original texts that are later adapted into professional theatrical productions. Several editions of Les Zinspirés have been nominated for Dora Mavor Moore Awards.

In 2016, Joël Beddows became artistic director.

In 2021, Karine Ricard succeeded Beddows as Artistic Director and later became Co-Executive Director. She currently leads the company alongside Managing Director and Co-Executive Director Ghislain Caron.

== Artistic direction and administration ==
- Artistic Director & Co-Executive Director: Karine Ricard
- Managing Director & Co-Executive Director: Ghislain Caron

== Programming and venues ==
While historically associated with the Berkeley Street Theatre, Théâtre français de Toronto now presents productions at multiple venues in Toronto, including the Theatre Centre and the Factory Theatre.

=== Recent seasons ===
The 2025–2026 season included a mix of classical, contemporary, and youth-oriented productions, such as:

- Le Malentendu by Albert Camus
- Les Zinspiré·e·s : À la lumière des 13 Lunes
- Nzinga
- Bonnes Bonnes
- Angle Mort

The season also featured family and youth productions, including Joséphine et les grandes personnes, Je suis William, and Les Contes du voyageur.

== Education and community engagement ==
Beyond its mainstage programming, the company is active in arts education and community outreach. Its initiatives include theatre and drama classes for children and youth, writing and creation programs for students, public readings and workshops, artist talks, and a theatre reading club offered in partnership with the Toronto Public Library. The company also produces digital content, including recorded discussions and interviews.

== Awards and recognition ==
Productions by Théâtre français de Toronto have received numerous awards and nominations, including Dora Mavor Moore Awards, Prix Rideau Awards, and the Masque Award for Best Franco-Canadian Production. The company has staged more than 300 productions since its founding.
