= Young People's Theatre =

Canadian youth theatre

- Interactive map of Young People's Theatre
- Address: 165 Front Street East
- Location: Toronto, Ontario, Canada
- Coordinates: 43°39′00″N 79°22′08″W
- Type: Theatre

Construction
- Built: 1888 (stables)
- Renovated: 1977 (theatre)

Website
- Official website

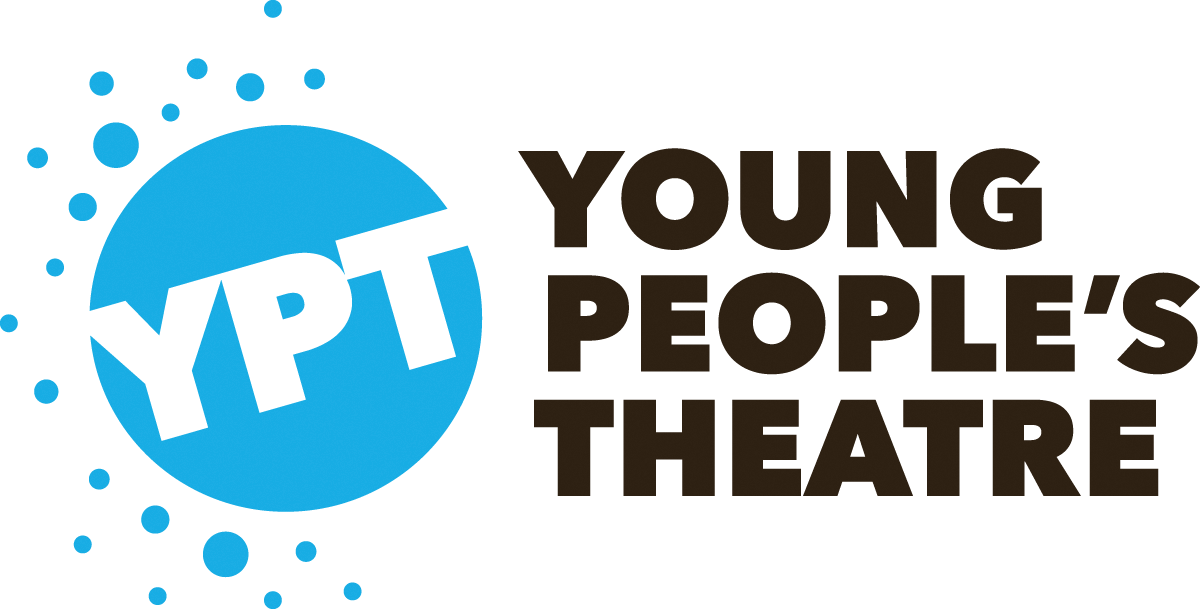
YPT logo

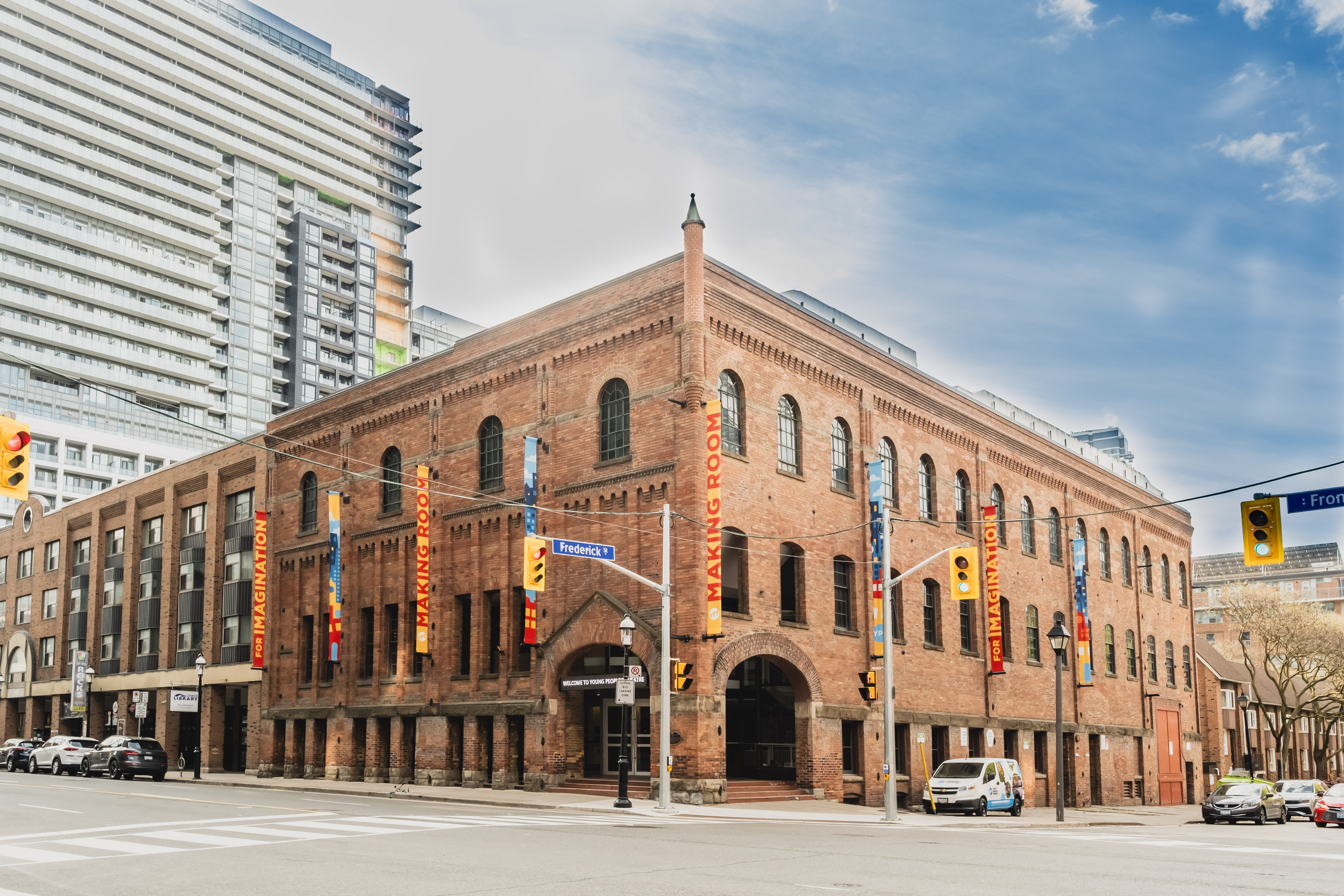
Exterior of Young People's Theatre.

Young People's Theatre (YPT) is a professional theatre for young audiences located in Toronto, Ontario. The company produces and presents a full season of theatre and arts education programming, performing to approximately 150,000 patrons annually. Founded in 1966 by Susan Douglas Rubeš, YPT originally operated out of the now-demolished Colonnade Theatre on Bloor Street. Since its 1977–78 season, the company has resided in a renovated heritage building in downtown Toronto.

YPT operates two performance spaces at 165 Front Street East: the Ada Slaight Stage and the Nathan Cohen Studio. It stages an average of eight productions each year. Herbie Barnes become the Artistic Director in the Spring of 2021 and Camilla Holland became the executive director in September 2024.

== History ==
Rubeš created the Museum Children's Theatre in her Toronto kitchen and opened Alice in Wonderland at the Royal Ontario Museum in 1963. Rubeš staged her first YPT show, The Looking Glass Revue, at the Colonnade Theatre in 1966.

Before being located at its current site, YPT staged shows at the St. Lawrence Centre, the Ontario Science Centre and Toronto's Firehall Theatre. The company also toured to schools throughout Ontario, and toured the play Inook and the Sun in the United Kingdom. In 1977, YPT staged its first show in its current location with an adaptation of The Lost Fairy Tale. YPT added a drama school in 1969. The Drama School operates in Downtown Toronto and Etobicoke.

Several stage and screen actors have appeared on the YPT mainstage since the 1970s, including Martin Short, Megan Follows, Brent Carver, Cynthia Dale, Fiona Reid, Gordon Pinsent, R.H Thomson, Sheila McCarthy and Eric Peterson. Celebrities such as Drake and Kiefer Sutherland also attended YPT's Drama School.

In the spring of 2001, the theatre was renamed Lorraine Kimsa Theatre for Young People after a donation of $1.5 million from Kevin Kimsa in honour of his mother, Lorraine. In March 2011, the theatre announced a change back to its original name.

The Slaight family's 2015 donation of $3 million resulted in the creation of the Ada Slaight Education Centre at YPT. At the time it was the largest non-capital gift received by a Toronto theatre company. In 2022 a gift from the Slaight Family resulted in the renaming of the company's Mainstage to the Ada Slaight Stage. In 2016 YPT was one of a number of theatres offering free tickets to newly arrived Syrian refugees.

In 2020, YPT began a $13.5 million expansion project that resulted in the purchase of a multi-use building - YPT 161 Studios - across the street from the theatre on Front Street. The theatre also underwent extensive renovations that were unveiled in Sept. 2022.

== The building ==
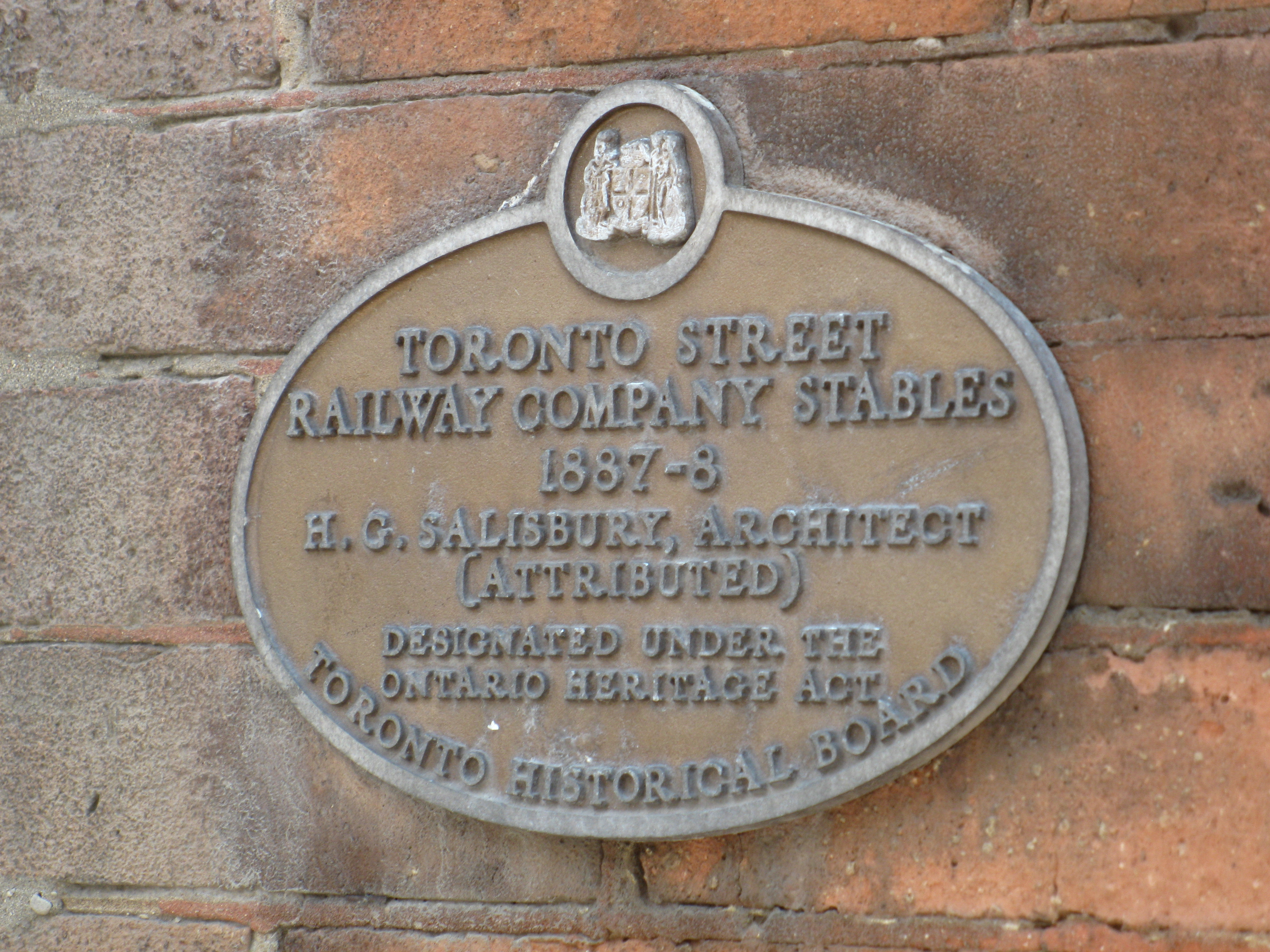
Historic plaque on the building

Young People Theatre's current home is a renovated 1887 heritage building in Toronto, Ontario. This site was a three-story stable for the horses that pulled Toronto Street Railways horse cars in the late 19th century, as well as an electrical plant and a Toronto Transit Commission warehouse. The warehouse sat empty for much of the 20th century before it became the site for YPT. The building was renovated in 1977 by Zeidler Partnership Architects to contain a large main stage (the current day Ada Slaight Stage) and a smaller studio. YPT was given an Award of Merit by the Toronto Historical Board in 1979, "for its imaginative and sympathetic treatment of a landmark that might otherwise have been destroyed". In 2020, a $13.5 million campaign to expand YPT's complex began, with the renovations unveiled in 2022.

== Artistic Directors ==
- Susan Douglas Rubes (1966-1979)
- Richard Ouzounian (1979-1980)
- Peter Moss (1980-1991)
- Maja Ardal (1991-1998)
- Pierre Tetrault (1998-2002)
- Allen MacInnis (2002-2021)
- Herbie Barnes (2021–present)

== Awards ==
- 76 Dora Mavor Moore Awards
- 13 Chalmers Children Awards for playwrighting.
- Toronto Arts Foundation Arts for Youth Award, 2016
- Ontario's Lieutenant Governor's Award for the Arts, 1998.
- Award of Merit, Heritage Toronto, 1979.
