= Range of Motion =

Range of Motion may refer to:

- Range of motion, the distance an object may travel while attached to another
- Range of Motion (exercise machine)
- Range of Motion, a 1995 book by Elizabeth Berg
- Range of Motion (film), a 2000 American made-for-television film
