= A Shayna Maidel =

Play by Barbara Lebow

- Written by: Barbara Lebow
- Original language: English
- Subject: Two Jewish sisters reunite after one of them survives the Nazi concentration camps.
- Genre: Drama

Premiere

A Shayna Maidel is a play by Barbara Lebow about the reunion of two sisters after World War II, one having survived the Nazi concentration camps. It was adapted into the award-winning teleplay Miss Rose White by Anna Sandor.

A Shayna Maidel was on stage at the Bellingham Theatre Guild in 2017.
