= John Frizzell =

John Frizzell may refer to:

- John Frizzell (screenwriter), Canadian screenwriter
- John Frizzell (composer) (born 1966), American composer
