= Susan Haley =

Canadian writer

Susan Charlotte Haley (born 1949) is a Canadian writer. Originally from Nova Scotia, where she grew up as the daughter of Acadia University academics, she pursued graduate studies in philosophy at the University of Alberta, teaching there and at the University of Saskatchewan for several years before moving to Fort Norman, Northwest Territories, where she became a partner with her husband, Marten Hartwell, in a private charter airline, and began writing.

Her debut novel, A Nest of Singing Birds, was a finalist for the Books in Canada First Novel Award in 1986, and was adapted by Eric Till into the 1988 television film A Nest of Singing Birds. Till subsequently also directed Getting Married in Buffalo Jump, a television film adapted from Haley's second novel, in 1990.

She later moved back to Nova Scotia, where she published the further novels The Complaints Department (2000), Maggie's Family (2002), and The Murder of Medicine Bear (2003).

== Works ==
- A Nest of Singing Birds (1986)
- Getting Married in Buffalo Jump (1988)
- The Complaints Department (2000)
- Maggie's Family (2002)
- The Murder of Medicine Bear (2003)
