= Gold Diggers: The Secret of Bear Mountain =

- Theatrical release poster
- Directed by: Kevin James Dobson
- Written by: Barry Glasser
- Produced by: Martin Bregman; Michael S. Bregman; Rolf Deyhle
- Starring: Anna Chlumsky; Christina Ricci; Polly Draper; Brian Kerwin; Diana Scarwid; David Keith
- Cinematography: Ross Berryman
- Edited by: Stephen W. Butler
- Music by: Joel McNeely
- Production companies: Bregman/Baer Productions, Inc.
- Distributed by: Universal Pictures
- Release date: November 3, 1995
- Running time: 93 minutes
- Country: United States
- Language: English
- Budget: $9 million
- Box office: $6 million

Gold Diggers: The Secret of Bear Mountain is a 1995 American adventure film directed by Kevin James Dobson, and starring Christina Ricci, Anna Chlumsky, Polly Draper, Brian Kerwin, Diana Scarwid, and David Keith. Set in 1980 in the Pacific Northwest, it follows two teenage girls who, inspired by a local legend, attempt to recover a fortune of gold inside a mountain.

== Plot ==
In June 1980, teenager Beth Easton and her recently widowed mother, Kate, relocate from Los Angeles to the small town of Wheaton, Washington, where they move into Kate's aunt's farmhouse. Initially, Beth misses the city and resents her new surroundings. In town she encounters Jody Salerno, a troubled but free-spirited teenager who has a bad reputation. While riding her bike the next day, Beth is forced off the road by a pickup truck and plummets down a steep ravine, crashing her bicycle into a river, where Jody is fishing.

Kate attempts to ingratiate Beth with two local girls named Tracy and Samantha. While they are picking berries at the house, Beth encounters Jody, who has been hiding in a tree and throwing cherries at them. Tracy and Samantha warn Beth against associating with Jody, but she joins her on a trek through the woods. They quickly become friends, and Jody tells Beth she has an adventure planned for the following day, the summer solstice. When Jody fails to meet Beth that morning, local sheriff Matt Hollinger offers her a ride to Jody's house. Jody's mother, Lynette, answers the door, appearing shaken and inebriated, and tells Beth that Jody is not home.

Matt brings Beth home and realizes that he is an old acquaintance of her mother. Beth receives a phone call from Jody, who directs her into the forest outside her house. She explains that she hid from Matt and Beth because she had broken in and stolen candy from the vending machines in the local high school; she then tells Beth the story of Molly Morgan, a female miner who purportedly died in a mine collapse in Bear Mountain while searching for gold. They board a motorized boat which Jody has hidden along the river, and ride downstream and into the mountain, where she has set up a makeshift living space in the cavern entryway. When Beth notices Jody's bandaged shoulder, Jody confesses that Lynette and her abusive boyfriend, Ray, had gotten into a fight the night before, and that Jody may have fatally wounded him after he chased her into the woods. Beth urges Jody to go to the police, but she refuses, planning to hide out in the mountain.

As a rainstorm approaches, Beth and Jody attempt to leave the cave, but a rock collapse damages the boat and pins Beth to the floor. Jody swims out of the cave and down the river, making it safely past a grizzly bear and to a road where she crosses paths with a state trooper. Beth is rescued just in time, as the water level has slowly risen inside the cave. At the hospital, Jody is confronted by Ray, who is still alive to the surprise of Jody and Beth.

Kate forbids Beth to spend time with Jody, but she appears at a Fourth of July picnic and divulges her plan to return to the mountain to get the gold. Kate eventually decides to let Beth see her, and they drive to her house the next day. Inside, they find it trashed and Lynette, beaten and incoherent, and no sign of Ray or Jody. Lynette is taken to the hospital and Beth insists to Matt that they go to the mountain, believing that Ray took Jody there. Beth assists Matt to the caves, but they are separated inside. Beth finds Jody, who tells her that a drunken Ray beat her and forced her to take him to find the gold.

Beth goes back to find Matt, and Jody is grabbed from behind by whom she believes is Ray—when she turns around, she finds it is an elderly woman, who then recedes into the shadows. Ray appears and attempts to grab Jody but is hit over the head with a shovel by the woman. Beth returns to find Jody and Ray, unconscious, but the woman, ostensibly Molly Morgan, has disappeared. Matt finally finds Beth and Jody and Ray is arrested. Lynette recovers in the hospital and Jody accepts her apologies.

In late August, Matt arrives at Beth's house, and brings her, Kate, Jody, and Lynette to the courthouse, where an attorney is representing an anonymous client who has bestowed a gift to Beth and Jody. They are given two bags, each containing gold, and cheered and applauded by the town citizens, including Tracy and Samantha.

== Cast ==
- Christina Ricci as Bethany "Beth" Easton
  - Jennifer Hale as Adult Beth (narrator)
- Anna Chlumsky as Josephine "Jody" Salerno
- Polly Draper as Kathryn "Kate" Easton
- Brian Kerwin as Sheriff Matthew "Matt" Hollinger
- Diana Scarwid as Lynette Salerno
- David Keith as Ray Karnisak
- Ashleigh Aston Moore as Tracy Briggs
- Jewel Staite as Samantha
- Gillian Barber as Grace Briggs
- Amy Kirk as Young Molly Morgan
  - Betty Phillips as Old Molly Morgan
- Dwight McFee as Sergeant Weller
- Andrew Wheeler as Hank
- Roger Cross as Paramedic
- Jesse Moss as Adam
- Henry Gibson as Man (Uncredited)

== Production ==
=== Casting ===
Christina Ricci and Anna Chlumsky's casting was announced in June 1994.

The film marked the first of two 1995 films to feature Ricci and Ashleigh Aston Moore, as they appeared in Now and Then, a similarly nostalgic coming of age film released the following month.

=== Filming ===
Gold Diggers: The Secret of Bear Mountain was primarily filmed in British Columbia, Canada, in the cities of Nelson and Pemberton. The river sequences were filmed on the Lillooet River in the southern Coast Mountains. Principal photography began in late August 1994 and was scheduled to be completed in October.

Some additional filming took place in Virginia in Chesapeake, Norfolk, and Virginia Beach.

== Music ==
The original score for the film was composed Joel McNeely, and released on compact disc by Varèse Sarabande. In addition to McNeely's compositions, the soundtrack features "The Flying Song", an original song by Scottish-Australian musician Colin Hay.

== Release ==
Initially planned for a spring 1995 release, Gold Diggers: The Secret of Bear Mountain was released theatrically in the United States later that year on November 3, 1995, by Universal Pictures. The film opened in 1,297 venues, reaching a peak of 1,301 venues, and remained in theatrical exhibition for nine weeks.

=== Home media ===
The film was released on VHS by MCA/Universal Home Video in 1996.

On November 24, 2009, Universal Pictures Home Entertainment released the film in made-on-demand DVD-R format as part of the Universal Vault Series. In 2017, Universal released it for the first time on DVD.

The film was released on Blu-ray by Mill Creek Entertainment on March 9, 2021.

== Reception ==
=== Box office ===
The film earned $2,535,645 during its opening weekend in 1,297 venues. It went on to gross a total of $6,029,091.

=== Critical response ===
Stephen Holden of The New York Times wrote: "Any movie that encourages young girls to be wilderness adventurers rather than boy-crazed babes-in-waiting certainly has its heart in the right place. That's why it's sad to report that Gold Diggers: The Secret of Bear Mountain, a movie about two friends who impulsively trek through the Washington State rain forest in search of a mythical cache of gold, is a pallid, halfhearted affair." Leonard Klady of Variety gave the film a similarly middling assessment, writing that "while director Kevin James Dobson has a feel for natural location, too often one simply can’t fathom how characters have traveled from one location to the next. Remaining tech credits are top-notch but cannot compensate for the script’s myriad inconsistencies and laughable plot twists. The picture has struck a rich vein that only the greenest of movie prospectors would fail to recognize as pyrites." Jack Garner of the Democrat and Chronicle wrote that the film "has been directed in adequate but lackluster style by Australian Kevin James Dobson. He works well with his juvenile stars, but doesn't have much of a flair for action sequences."

Marjorie Baumgarten of The Austin Chronicle alternately praised Ricci and Chlumsky's performances, and called the film a "a better-than-average kid's picture." The Washington Post's Hal Hinson praised the film, writing: "Though Australian director Kevin James Dobson keeps his audience involved in the dangerous task of recovering the gold, the real essence of the movie lies in the rapport between these best friends. Screenwriter Barry Glasser does a superb job of entering the world of young girls on the verge of becoming women. Or, perhaps, it's just that these two exceptional actresses make him look good. As the movie unfolds, the adventure plot and the intensifying drama back home intertwine nicely, and very much to the benefit of both."

Kevin Thomas of the Los Angeles Times described the film as "intelligent entertainment enlivened with first-rate performances all around... Cinematographer Ross Berryman captures the grandeur of the film’s setting, but at times Joel McNeely’s grandiose score threatens to overwhelm this unpretentious picture. It’s a testament to the film’s sturdiness that it survives McNeely’s unintended efforts to drown it." Roger Ebert gave the film two-and-a-half stars, noting: "Gold Diggers is not my cup of tea, but it is sure to be enjoyed by younger audiences, and although I don't think it will hold the attention of adults, I do not require adults and children to be alike in all things."

On review aggregator Rotten Tomatoes, the film has 50% approval based on ten reviews, with an average rating of 6.1/10 – indicating a "Rotten" consensus.
