= Greg Chapman =

Canadian sound engineer

- Occupation: Sound engineer

Greg Chapman is a Canadian sound engineer. He was nominated for a Academy Award in the category Best Sound for the film Frankenstein.

In addition to his Academy Award nomination, he won two Canadian Screen Awards in the category Best Sound Mixing for the films The Mortal Instruments: City of Bones and Pompeii. He was also nominated for two Gemini Awards in the category Best Sound for the films Beethoven Lives Upstairs and The Planet of Junior Brown.

== Selected filmography ==
- Beethoven Lives Upstairs (1992)
- The Planet of Junior Brown (1997)
- The Mortal Instruments: City of Bones (2013)
- Pompeii (2014)
- Frankenstein (2025; co-nominated with Nathan Robitaille, Nelson Ferreira, Christian Cooke and Brad Zoern)
