= In This Corner =

In This Corner may refer to:

- In This Corner (1948 film), an American sports drama film directed by Charles Reisner
- In This Corner (1986 film), a Canadian TV film directed by Atom Egoyan
