= Larry Fineberg =

Canadian playwright (born 1945)

Larry Fineberg (born 1945 in Montreal, Quebec) is a Canadian playwright. He is most noted for his 1976 play Eve, an adaptation of Constance Beresford-Howe's novel The Book of Eve which won the Floyd S. Chalmers Canadian Play Award.

Originally from the Côte-Saint-Luc borough of Montreal, Fineberg briefly attended McGill University before transferring to Emerson College in Boston. While there, he was a producer of several theatre productions, including Fiddler on the Roof and Cabaret, and worked as an assistant director to Frank Loesser. He returned to Canada in 1972, and his first play Stonehenge Trilogy was staged by Toronto's Factory Theatre that year.

His other plays have included Death (1972), Hope (1972), All the Ghosts (1973), Lady Celeste's Tea (1974), Waterfall (1974), Human Remains (1975), Fresh Disasters (1976), Life on Mars (1979), Montreal (1981), Devotion (1985), Failure of Nerve (1991), Doctor's Liver (1992), The Final Solution (1992) and The Clairvoyant (2000), as well as an adaptation of Medea which was staged at the Stratford Festival in 1978.

Fineberg was a writer-in-residence at Stratford and Buddies in Bad Times, and a founding member of the Playwrights Guild of Canada.

Many of Fineberg's plays address gay themes. Fineberg identified himself as bisexual.
