= Elizabeth Berg =

Elizabeth Berg may refer to:

- Elizabeth Berg (author) (born 1948), American author
- Z Berg (Elizabeth Berg, born 1986), American musician

== See also ==
- Berg (surname)
