= Illya Woloshyn =

Canadian actor (died 2023)

- Born: Illya Symon Woloshyn; December 1979; Barrie, Ontario, Canada
- Died: January 19, 2023 (aged 43); Barrie, Ontario, Canada
- Years active: 1986–1999
- Spouse: Tanya Pelensky (m. 2003)

Illya Symon Woloshyn (c. 1979 – January 19, 2023) was a Canadian actor of Ukrainian descent.

Woloshyn started acting at a very young age, playing the role of Jacob in Jacob Two-Two Meets the Hooded Fang at Young People's Theatre in Toronto, and later Gavroche in the original Toronto production of Les Misérables at the Royal Alexandra Theatre in 1988. He did later join the touring production and performed the role in theatres across Canada.

After leaving Les Misérables, he landed the role of Jay in the national Canadian television series The Odyssey in 1992.

Woloshyn retired from acting in 1999.

== Death ==
He died suddenly at home in Barrie, Ontario, on January 19, 2023, at age 43.

== Filmography ==
=== Film ===
Year	Title	Role	Notes
1986	The Last Season	Tommy Shannon	
1989	Exposed		Short
1991	Johann's Gift to Christmas	Johann	
1993	I'll Never Get to Heaven	Mario	
1999	Letters to a Street Child	Derek	Short, final film role

=== Television ===
Year	Title	Role	Notes
1988	A Nest of Singing Birds	Gregor	TV movie
1988	Night Heat		episode: False Witness
1988	The Twilight Zone	Chad Judson	episode: The Hellgramite Method
1989	Friday the 13th: The Series	Danny Green	episode: The Playhouse
1989	War of the Worlds	Torri	episode: Seft of Emun
1992	Forever Knight	Daniel	episode: Father Figure
1992	Beethoven Lives Upstairs	Christoph	TV movie
1992, 1994	The Kids in the Hall	son, Chad	episode: #3.19 (son), #4.16 (Chad)
1992–1994	The Odyssey	Jay Ziegler	Main role (39 episodes)
1993	Are You Afraid of the Dark?	Augie Wilson	episode: The Tale of the Hatching
1994	Hush Little Baby	Dylan	TV movie
1998	Mythic Warriors: Guardians of the Legend	Teen Onetor	episode: Daedalus and lcarus
1999	Vanished Without a Trace	Johnny	TV movie

=== Music videos ===
Year	Title	Artist	Role	Ref.
1994	Are You Afraid of the Dark?: Feel the Fear		Self (Archive Footage)	
