= Open House (novel) =

2000 novel by Elizabeth Berg

- First edition cover
- Author: Elizabeth Berg
- Language: English
- Genre: Novel
- Publisher: Random House
- Publication date: August 2000
- Publication place: United States
- Media type: Print (hardback & paperback)
- Pages: 241 p. (hardback edition) & 272 p. (paperback edition)
- ISBN: 0-375-50603-9 (hardback edition) & ISBN 0-345-43516-8 (paperback edition)
- OCLC: 54467913

Open House is a 2000 novel by U.S. author Elizabeth Berg. It was an Oprah's Book Club selection in 2000.

== Plot summary ==
Throughout the 20 years of her marriage, Samantha Morrow has been content with her life, though she knows it isn't perfect. She has a nice home, a great son, and a husband she loves. But everything is turned upside down when her husband, David, tells her he wants out of their marriage. His rapid departure on the heels of this announcement leaves Sam horribly shocked, utterly confused, and oddly obsessed with Martha Stewart. Her initial reaction is to go on a spending spree, charging thousands of dollars' worth of merchandise at Tiffany's to her husband's credit card. But when reality sets in and her husband cuts her off, she realizes that if she wants to keep the house she loves and make a home for herself and her son, she's going to have to generate some income.

To help meet the mortgage payments on her new home, Sam decides to take in two boarders, using a finished basement area and a spare upstairs bedroom.Her first tenant is Lydia Fitch, the elderly mother of an acquaintance. Lydia quickly becomes a supportive presence in the household and develops a close relationship with Sam's son, Travis. Meanwhile, Sam's mother, who has remained active in the dating scene since being widowed many years earlier, becomes determined to gind Sam a new romantic partner, creating additional complications in Sam's life.

Sam's life is further complicated when she starts looking for a job, for other than a gig singing in a band years ago, she's never been employed. But then King, the gentle giant of a man who helps Lydia move in, puts Sam in touch with the employment agency he works for. Suddenly Sam is off on a variety of short-term jobs, everything from making change at a Laundromat, to working as a carpenter's helper. When she gets the devastating news that Lydia has decided to marry her longtime beau and move out, Sam takes on a second boarder for the basement space: a sullen, depressed college student.

== Film adaptation ==
Based on a best-seller by Elizabeth Berg, this made-for-TV movie stars Christine Lahti as Samantha Morrow, a middle-class mom deserted by her husband, David (Chris Potter). In order to maintain the house for her and her son Travis (Mark Rendall), Samantha decides to take in boarders: her friend's mother Lydia (Rita Moreno) and a homeless young woman named Lavender Blue (Grace Lynn Kung). Also on hand are an odd-jobs man named King (Daniel Baldwin), Samantha's highly-opinionated mother (Eva Marie Saint), and cable-TV home-design expert Colin Cowie (as himself).
