= The Marriage Bed =

- Genre: Drama
- Based on: The Marriage Bed by Constance Beresford-Howe
- Written by: Anna Sandor
- Directed by: Martin Lavut
- Starring: Linda Griffiths; Layne Coleman; Jan Rubeš; Vivian Reis
- Country of origin: Canada
- Original language: English

Production
- Producer: Bill Gough

Original release
- Network: CBC Television
- Release: December 21, 1986

The Marriage Bed is a Canadian television film, directed by Martin Lavut and broadcast by CBC Television in 1986. Adapted from the novel by Constance Beresford-Howe, the film stars Linda Griffiths as Annie Graham, a woman who is pregnant with her third child but whose marriage to her husband Ross (Layne Coleman) is breaking down, who is confronted by her friends and family about her choice to concentrate on being a housewife and mother rather than pursuing her career as a botanist.

The film's cast also includes Jan Rubeš and Vivian Reis as Annie's parents Max and Billie, Lyn Jackson as Ross's mother Edwina and R. H. Thomson as Dr. Jeff Reilly, as well as Clare Coulter, Martha Gibson, Eric Keenleyside, Carole Lazare and Sheila McCarthy in supporting roles.

For the purposes of the film, writer Anna Sandor set the story around the Christmas season; although not specifically a Christmas-themed film, she felt that the Christmas season's connotations of family togetherness helped to illuminate the film's themes.

The film aired on December 21, 1986.

== Awards and nominations ==
Award	Year	Category	Nominee(s)	Result	Ref.
Gemini Awards	1987	Best TV Movie		Won	
Gemini Awards	1987	Best Supporting Actress in a Drama Program or Series	Vivian Reis	Won	
Gemini Awards	1987	Best Direction in a Dramatic Program or Mini-Series	Martin Lavut	Won	
Gemini Awards	1987	Best Performance by a Lead Actress in a Dramatic Program or Mini-Series	Linda Griffiths	Nominated	
Gemini Awards	1987	Best Writing in a Dramatic Program or Mini-Series	Anna Sandor	Nominated	
