= Dixie Seatle =

Canadian actress

Dixie Seatle is a Canadian actress and faculty member in the Acting for Film and Television program at Humber College's School of Creative and Performing Arts in Toronto, Ontario. Her first film credit was a supporting role in the 1978 production of A Gift to Last. Seatle won Gemini Awards for her work on the series Adderly and Paradise Falls She performed lead roles on stage across Canada, including five seasons at the Stratford Festival.

She is a graduate of Dawson College and the National Theatre School in Montreal. She has also taught at the Stratford Festival, the Toronto Centre for the Arts, George Brown College, and Earl Haig Secondary School.

In an op-ed published in September 2014, in The Globe and Mail, triggered by observing a farmer sending a cow to the slaughterhouse, due to its record of miscarriages, Seatle wrote about bonding with the cow over the loss of an offspring, because she too had lost a child.

After eleven years as a full time professor at Humber College, she retired to take up painting full time, and has exhibited at the Durham Gallery, Arts of Ten (Flesherton), Autumn Leaves Studio Tour, Walters Falls Group of Artists, Craig Gallery, Propeller Gallery (Toronto), and the Owen Sound Co-op Gallery.

== Filmography ==
=== Film ===
Year	Title	Role	Notes
1980	Hank Williams: The Show He Never Gave	Betty Anne	
1981	Ticket to Heaven	Sarah	
1996	Joe's So Mean to Josephine	Mrs. Collins	
1999	Jacob Two Two Meets the Hooded Fang	Jacob's Mom	

=== Television ===
Year	Title	Role	Notes
1975	Dr. Simon Locke	Carol Thompson	Episode: "Insight to Murder"
1978	Hedda Gabler	Thea Elvsted	Television film
1978, 1979	A Gift to Last	Sheila Dooley	2 episodes
1980	A Population of One	Willy Doyle	Television film
1982	The Littlest Hobo	Mrs. Donnen	Episode: "Napoleon"
1984	The Glitter Dome	Amazing Grace	Television film
1986	Night Heat	Kate Chaffee	Episode: "Neighbors"
1986	Philip Marlowe, Private Eye	Sadie	Episode: "Spanish Blood"
1986–1988	Adderly	Mona Ellerby	44 episodes
1988	Katts and Dog	Mrs. O'Neil	Episode: "Race Against Time"
1989	Men	Norma Green	Episode: "When the Wind Blows"
1989	War of the Worlds	Teri Novak	Episode: "So Shall Ye Reap"
1990, 1992	E.N.G.	Sara / Betty Schultz	2 episodes
1992	Beyond Reality	Elizabeth Wade	Episode: "The Color of Mad"
1992	The Women of Windsor	Camilla	Television film
1992	Forever Knight	Barbara Norton	Episode: "Spin Doctor"
1992	Neon Rider	Jane	Episode: "Point Break"
1993	Street Legal	Francine Decker	Episode: "Black and White in Color"
1995	Kung Fu: The Legend Continues	Sharon	Episode: "Flying Fists of Fury II: Masters of Illusion"
1998	Goosebumps	Aunt Benna	2 episodes
1998	Stranger in Town	Officer Terri Orloff	Television film
1998	Due South	Beth Botrelle	Episode: "The Ladies' Man"
1999	Psi Factor	Laura Young	Episode: "Body and Soul"
1999	The Lady in Question	Gertie Moser	Television film
2000	The Secret Adventures of Jules Verne	Lily Ledoux	Episode: "The Ballad of Steeley Joe"
2000	Range of Motion	Pat Swenson	Television film
2001	Doc	Lorene	Episode: "Pilot: Part 1"
2001–2008	Paradise Falls	Bea Sutton	72 episodes
2002	Screech Owls	Dr. Roe	Episode: "Sacred Ground"
2002	Gilda Radner: It's Always Something	Joanna Bull	Television film
2002	The Pact	Sherrill Delaney	Television film
2002	Salem Witch Trials	Sarah Osborne	Television film
2002–2003	Street Time	Judy Goldstein	3 episodes
2003	The Piano Man's Daughter	Eleanor Hess	Television film
2004	Lives of the Saints	Signy Bok	Television film
2009, 2014	Murdoch Mysteries	Mrs. Kitchen	2 episodes
