= Beautiful Dreamers =

- Directed by: John Kent Harrison
- Written by: John Kent Harrison
- Starring: Colm Feore; Rip Torn; Wendel Meldrum; Sheila McCarthy
- Cinematography: François Protat
- Edited by: Ron Wisman
- Music by: Lawrence Shragge
- Distributed by: C/FP Distribution
- Release date: 1990
- Running time: 105 mins.
- Country: Canada
- Language: English
- Box office: C$320,000 (Canada)

Beautiful Dreamers is a 1990 Canadian film directed by John Kent Harrison. It stars Colm Feore and Rip Torn. It was nominated for four Genie Awards in 1991.

== Synopsis ==
Rip Torn is the American poet Walt Whitman. The setting is a 19th-century Canadian institution for the intellectually disabled. A compassionate London, Ontario, doctor named Richard Bucke (Colm Feore) defies his superiors by treating his patients as human beings rather than animals. When Whitman champions his cause, the doctor is ostracized by those who fear the poet's reputation as a freethinking radical. Based on a true incident – Whitman spent the summer with Dr. Bucke in 1880.

== Cast ==
- Colm Feore as Richard Maurice Bucke
- Rip Torn as Walt Whitman
- Wendel Meldrum as Jessie Bucke
- Sheila McCarthy as Molly Jessop
- Colin Fox as Rev Haines
- Roland Hewgill as Timothy Pardee
