= Harlan County War (film) =

2000 film

- Genre: Biography; Drama
- Written by: Peter Silverman
- Directed by: Tony Bill
- Starring: Holly Hunter; Stellan Skarsgård
- Theme music composer: Van Dyke Parks
- Country of origin: United States
- Original language: English

Production
- Executive producers: Chris Ciaffa; Robert W. Cort; David Madden; Mimi Rogers
- Producer: Keri Selig
- Production location: Toronto
- Cinematography: Flavio Martínez Labiano
- Editor: Axel Hubert
- Running time: 104 minutes
- Production companies: Cort/Madden Productions; Millbrook Farm Productions

Original release
- Network: Showtime
- Release: June 4, 2000

Harlan County War (2000) is a television film directed by Tony Bill and written by Peter Silverman. It aired on Showtime.

== Plot ==
A Kentucky woman whose mine-worker husband is nearly killed in a cave-in, and whose father is slowly dying of black lung, joins the picket lines for a long, violent strike.

== Cast ==
- Holly Hunter as Ruby Kincaid
- Stellan Skarsgård as Warren Jakopovich
- Ted Levine as Silas Kincaid
- Wayne Robson as Tug Jones
- Alex House as Buddy Kincaid
- Charlotte Arnold as Lucinda Kincaid
- Ker Wells as Little Lee
- Jennifer Irwin as Mary Ball
- Rufus Crawford as Bill Worthington
- Cliff Saunders as Lawrence Perkins
- Deborah Pollitt as Ora Perkins
- Tim Burd as Dillard Ball
- Tom Harvey as Jerry Selvey
- Reginald Doresa as Bronce Breckenridge
- Helen Hughes as Aunt Melva Jones

== Awards and nominations ==
Emmy Awards

- Outstanding Actress Lead Actress in a Miniseries or Movie (Hunter, nominated)

Golden Globe Awards

- Best Actress - Miniseries or Television Film (Hunter, nominated)

Satellite Awards

- Best Actress – Miniseries or Television Film (Hunter, nominated)

== See also ==
- Harlan County, USA, a documentary about the Brookside strike in 1972
- Matewan, a drama about the Matewan strike in West Virginia, in 1920
