= The Odyssey (TV series) =

1992 Canadian children's TV series

- Main Title Card
- Starring: Illya Woloshyn; Ashley Rogers; Tony Sampson; Janet Hodgkinson; Dwight Koss; Andrea Nemeth
- Country of origin: Canada
- No. of seasons: 3
- No. of episodes: 39

Production
- Executive producer: Michael Chechik
- Running time: 30 min.
- Production companies: Omni Film Productions; Water Street Pictures

Original release
- Network: CBC Television
- Release: March 9, 1992 – December 26, 1994

The Odyssey is a Canadian half-hour adventure fantasy television series for children, originally broadcast from 1992 to 1994 on CBC Television.

== Plot ==
In the series pilot, 11-year-old Jay (Illya Woloshyn) tries to join a tree-fort club, led by the tough Keith (Tony Sampson). As per the prearranged agreement, Jay has brought something of value to contribute to the club: a telescope that belonged to his father (Robert Wisden) who has been missing for several years and is presumed dead. Keith double-crosses Jay and takes the telescope, denying him admission into the club. Jay tries to retrieve the telescope with the help of his physically disabled friend Donna (Ashley Rogers), who uses a crutch and a leg brace in order to walk. Jay falls from the tree fort and striking his head against a rock, lapses into a coma.

In the coma, Jay finds himself in a fantasy world called Downworld where no one reaches the age of 16. Not having heard of adults, the children here have shaped society in their own ways, forming mostly tribal clans in the form of Clubs, such as the Pool Club and the Library Club. The biggest and most powerful Club is the Tower, a brutal despotic police state run by the oldest kids, with Brad as the absolute ruler because he is 15, and "knows everything". Jay, not knowing how he has got here and aided by his friends Alpha and Flash (who are identical to Donna and Keith), embarks on a journey to return home — a place that he cannot remember. The journey becomes a quest to find his long-lost father, whose name happens to be Brad, who fell overboard from a small boat into a lake while they were on a fishing trip together and has not been seen since.

Meanwhile, Jay's mother and a coma therapist try to get Jay to regain consciousness, with the help of his friends.

A turning point is reached when Jay's father appears to him as he is regaining consciousness, which Jay is forced to keep a secret from his mother. As Jay struggles to re-orient himself to the waking world and the many changes that have occurred, he finds that he is still dealing with issues through the world from his subconscious.

== Cast ==
=== Main ===
- Illya Woloshyn as Jay Ziegler
- Ashley Rogers as Donna/Alpha
- Tony Sampson as Keith/Flash
- Janet Hodgkinson as Valerie "Val" Ziegler, Jay's mother
- Dwight Koss as Dr. Max Oswald (main season 1; recurring season 2)
- Andrea Nemeth (recurring seasons 1–2; main season 3) as Medea/Sierra Jones

=== Recurring ===
- Mark Hildreth as Finger/Mic
- Ryan Reynolds as Macro/Lee
- Austin Basile as Teen Brad
- Robert Wisden (season 2) as Bradley "Brad" Ziegler, Jay's father
- Jeremy Radick as Fractal/Nathan
- Amber Warnat as Lila/Keith's girlfriend
- Garwin Sanford as Arthur Bourne, Val's lawyer and first boyfriend/Iceface
- Andrew Airlie as Val's second boyfriend
- Jay Brazeau as Sy, Jay's psychiatrist
- Jorge Vargas as Savage

=== Notable guests ===
- Devon Sawa as Yudo
- Jewel Staite as Labelia
- Jai West as Feelgood (season 1) and Spook (season 3)

== Production ==
The series, created by Paul Vitols and Warren Easton, was produced in Vancouver by Water Street Pictures. Over the three years of production, 39 episodes were made. Due to a decreased viewership for season 3, the series was cancelled before reaching its intended conclusion, ending the last season with cliffhangers both in the Upworld and Downworld.

== Episodes ==
=== Season 1 (1992–93) ===
No. overall	No. in season	Title	Directed by	Written by	Original release date
1	1	"The Fall"	Jorge Montesi	Paul Vitols & Warren Easton	November 2, 1992
2	2	"No Fair"	Brad Turner	Paul Vitols & Warren Easton	November 9, 1992
3	3	"Out of the Woods"	Brad Turner	Paul Vitols & Warren Easton	November 16, 1992
4	4	"By the Book"	Graeme Campbell	Paul Vitols & Warren Easton	November 23, 1992
5	5	"Checkpoint Eagle"	Bill Brayne	Paul Vitols & Warren Easton	November 30, 1992
6	6	"The Believers"	Brad Turner	Paul Vitols & Warren Easton	December 7, 1992
7	7	"A Place Called Nowhere"	Don McBrearty	Paul Vitols & Warren Easton	December 14, 1992
8	8	"Wanted"	TW Peacocke	Hart Hanson and Paul Vitols & Warren Easton	December 21, 1992
9	9	"Galileo & the Gypsies"	Don McBrearty	Paul Vitols & Warren Easton	December 28, 1992
10	10	"In the Dark"	TW Peacocke	Hart Hanson & Paul Vitols & Warren Easton	January 4, 1993
11	11	"The Brad Exchange"	Rex Bromfield	Paul Vitols & Warren Easton	January 11, 1993
12	12	"Welcome to the Tower"	Rex Bromfield	Paul Vitols & Warren Easton	January 18, 1993
13	13	"The One Called Brad"	Rex Bromfield	Paul Vitols & Warren Easton	January 25, 1993

=== Season 2 (1994) ===
No. overall	No. in season	Title	Directed by	Written by	Original release date
14	1	"Lands End"	René Bonnière	Charles Lazer	January 24, 1994
15	2	"To the Lighthouse"	TW Peacocke	Paul Vitols & Warren Easton	January 31, 1994
16	3	"Some Place Like Home"	René Bonnière	Charles Lazer	February 7, 1994
17	4	"Whispers Like Thunder"	Stefan Scaini	Hart Hanson	February 14, 1994
18	5	"The Hall of Darkness"	TW Peacocke	Brad Wright	February 21, 1994
19	6	"The Prophecy"	Stefan Scaini	Dennis Foon	February 28, 1994
20	7	"The Greatest Show on Earth"	Rex Bromfield	Jim Makichuk	March 7, 1994
21	8	"But Where is Here?"	Steve DiMarco	Brad Wright	March 14, 1994
22	9	"The Big Picture"	René Bonnière	Gary Fisher	March 21, 1994
23	10	"Tick Tock"	Rex Bromfield	Paul Vitols & Warren Easton	March 28, 1994
24	11	"Run for Your Life"	René Bonnière	Charles Lazer	April 4, 1994
25	12	"Who Do You Believe?"	Stefan Scaini	Hart Hanson	April 11, 1994
26	13	"You Decide"	René Bonnière	Charles Lazer	August 18, 1994

=== Season 3 (1994) ===
No. overall	No. in season	Title	Directed by	Written by	Original release date
27	1	"No Way Out"	René Bonnière	Charles Lazer	October 3, 1994
28	2	"Dart to the Heart"	René Bonnière	Brad Wright	October 10, 1994
29	3	"Learning Curve"	Allan King	Dennis Foon	October 17, 1994
30	4	"Night Life"	Stacey Curtis	Leila Basen	October 24, 1994
31	5	"Cry Justice"	TW Peacocke	Charles Lazer	October 31, 1994
32	6	"King for a Day"	Alex Pappas	Ian Weir	November 7, 1994
33	7	"The Cauldron"	Richard Leiterman	Leila Basen	November 14, 1994
34	8	"Styx and Stones"	René Bonnière	Deborah Nathan	November 21, 1994
35	9	"Tug of War"	Alex Chapple	Gregory Kennedy	November 28, 1994
36	10	"Tangled Web"	Alex Pappas	Ian Weir	December 5, 1994
37	11	"No Holds Barred"	E. Jane Thompson	Charles Lazer	December 12, 1994
38	12	"The Plague"	Alex Pappas	Nancy Merritt Bell & James Tichenor	December 19, 1994
39	13	"Time Bomb"	Steve DiMarco	Charles Lazer & Leila Basen	December 26, 1994

== Release ==
=== Broadcast ===
The pilot episode was originally aired in Canada on March 9, 1992, as The Jellybean Odyssey.

The series was shown on Network 2 in Ireland as part of their children's strand of programming The Den in 1994. The show was broadcast in the U.S. by the Sci-Fi Channel, in the UK by Nickelodeon and Channel 4 in 1995 (repeated in 1998), in France by M6 (first season only) and then by France 3 (whole series), and in a number of other countries.

The series aired in Hong Kong on ATV World.

The first 26 episodes aired in French on Radio-Canada during the 1994–95 season, under the title "L'odyssée fantastique". It re-aired in 1996 and 1998.

=== Home media ===
A special edition DVD of the complete series was made in limited quantities and is sold through Omni Film Productions.

=== Streaming ===
The Odyssey can also be purchased digitally from Vimeo. From May 25, 2018 to January 9, 2019, the series was uploaded to Canada Media Fund’s YouTube channel Encore+. However the channel was shut down in 2022. It can currently be streamed on the services Plex and Tubi in Canada.

== Accolades ==
Awards won by the series include the Top Ten World Program at the Cologne Conference and a Canadian Gemini for Best Youth Program.

== Potential reboot ==
In June 2016, Marblemedia and Omnifilm Entertainment announced that they had joined forces to update and reboot The Odyssey. The reboot was to be adapted by showrunners Simon Racioppa and Richard Elliott.
