= A Population of One =

- Genre: Drama
- Based on: A Population of One by Constance Beresford-Howe
- Written by: Anna Sandor
- Directed by: Robert Sherrin
- Starring: Dixie Seatle; R. H. Thomson; Tony Van Bridge
- Theme music composer: Lawrence Shragge
- Country of origin: Canada
- Original language: English

Production
- Producer: Bonnie Felker

Original release
- Network: CBC Television
- Release: September 13, 1980

A Population of One is a Canadian television film, directed by Robert Sherrin and broadcast by CBC Television in 1980. Based on the novel by Constance Beresford-Howe, the film stars Dixie Seatle as Willy Doyle, a young woman who gets her first job as a professor of 19th-century English literature at a university, where she finds herself romantically attracted to her colleague John Trueman (R. H. Thomson).

The cast also includes Tony Van Bridge as Archie Clark, the head of the English faculty; Kate Lynch as Marg, a faculty colleague; Jonathan Welsh as Marg's boyfriend Harry, an activist who is lobbying to get Archie deposed as department head in favour of a younger professor with more modern teaching methods; and Nicholas Campbell as Mike, a student with his own interest in Willy.

The teleplay was written by Anna Sandor.

== Cast ==
- Nicholas Campbell as Mike
- Kate Lynch as Marg
- Dixie Seatle as Willy Doyle
- R.H. Thomson as John Trueman
- Tony Van Bridge as Archie
- Jonathan Welsh as Harry

== Awards and nominations ==
Award	Year	Category	Nominee(s)	Result	Ref.
ACTRA Awards	April 10, 1981	Best Television Actor	Dixie Seatle	Nominated	
Bijou Awards	October 28, 1981	Best Actress, Non-Feature	Dixie Seatle	Nominated	
