= A Nest of Singing Birds =

1987 Canadian TV movie

- Genre: Drama
- Based on: A Nest of Singing Birds by Susan Haley
- Written by: Joe Wiesenfeld
- Directed by: Eric Till
- Starring: Sheila McCarthy; Barry McGregor; Colm Feore
- Theme music composer: Eric Robertson
- Country of origin: Canada
- Original language: English

Production
- Producers: Peter Kelly; Flora Macdonald
- Cinematography: Nikos Evdemon
- Editors: Ralph Brunjes; Alice Sinclair
- Running time: 97 minutes

Original release
- Network: CBC
- Release: January 24, 1988

A Nest of Singing Birds is a Canadian drama television film, directed by Eric Till and broadcast by CBC Television in 1988. Adapted from the novel by Susan Haley, which was a finalist for the Books in Canada First Novel Award in 1986, the film stars Sheila McCarthy as Anna Callaghan, a philosophy professor who accepts a job as a sessional lecturer at a small Canadian university, where she is drawn into a romance with older colleague Ian McGregor (Barry McGregor).

The cast also includes Colm Feore, Bernard Behrens, Mairon Bennett, David Bolt, Patricia Collins, Illya Woloshyn, Ian D. Clark, and Stephen Ouimette in supporting roles.

The film was shot in Saskatoon, largely on the campus of the University of Saskatchewan, in 1987, and was broadcast by CBC Television on January 24, 1988.

== Awards ==
Award	Date of ceremony	Category	Nominees	Result	Ref.
Gemini Awards	1988	Best Television Movie or Miniseries	Peter Kelly, Flora Macdonald	Nominated	
Gemini Awards	1988	Best Actress in a Dramatic Program or Miniseries	Sheila McCarthy	Nominated	
Gemini Awards	1988	Best Writing in a Dramatic Program or Miniseries	Joe Wiesenfeld	Nominated	
Gemini Awards	1988	Best Production Design	Paul Ames	Nominated	
