= Getting Married in Buffalo Jump =

- DVD cover
- Based on: Getting Married in Buffalo Jump by Susan Haley
- Written by: John Frizzell
- Directed by: Eric Till
- Starring: Wendy Crewson; Paul Gross
- Music by: Eric Robertson
- Country of origin: Canada
- Original language: English

Production
- Producer: Flora Macdonald
- Cinematography: Nikos Evdemon
- Editor: Bruce Lange
- Running time: 97 minutes

Original release
- Network: CBC Television
- Release: November 1990

Getting Married in Buffalo Jump is a Canadian television movie, broadcast by CBC Television in November 1990. It was directed by Eric Till, and written by John Frizzell based on the novel of the same title by Susan Haley.

== Plot ==
After her father's death, Sophie Ware (Wendy Crewson) returns to her home town in hopes of running the family ranch. She struggles with the awkwardness of being home as she is now used to living in a big city as an accomplished musician. She is surprised when Alex (Paul Gross), the farm's handyman, offers her a marriage of convenience in order to keep the farm afloat.

== Cast ==
- Wendy Crewson as Sophie Ware
- Paul Gross as Alex Bresnyachuk
- Marion Gilsenan as Vera Ware
- Victoria Snow as Eleanor
- Murray Cruchley as Robert Marcovich
- Kyra Harper as Annie
- Diane Gordon as Momma Bresnyachuk
- Ivan Horsky as Poppa Bresnyachuk
- Florence Patterson as Irene McCallum
- Alexander Brown as Bennie
- Andy Maton as Walter
- Kirk Grayson as Dance teacher
- Kent McNeill as Luke Bresnyachuk
- Lesley Schatz as Country Singer
- J.C. Roberts as Rancher in Bar

== Awards ==
The film was nominated for four Gemini awards at the 6th Gemini Awards in 1992:

1. Best TV Movie — Flora Macdonald and Peter Kelly
2. Best Performance by an Actress in a Leading Role in a Dramatic Program or Mini-Series — Wendy Crewson
3. Best Performance by an Actress in a Supporting Role — Marion Gilsenan
4. Best Writing in a Dramatic Program or Mini-Series — John Frizzell
