= The Surrogate (1984 film) =

- Theatrical release poster
- Directed by: Don Carmody
- Written by: Don Carmody; Robert Geoffrion
- Produced by: Don Carmody; John Dunning; André Fleury (executive); André Link (executive)
- Starring: Art Hindle; Carole Laure; Shannon Tweed; Jackie Burroughs
- Cinematography: François Protat
- Edited by: Rit Wallis
- Music by: Daniel Lanois
- Distributed by: Metro-Goldwyn-Mayer
- Release date: 2 November 1984
- Running time: 100 minutes
- Country: Canada
- Language: English

The Surrogate is a 1984 Canadian erotic thriller film directed by Don Carmody and starring Art Hindle, Carole Laure, Shannon Tweed, and Jackie Burroughs. The film was written by Don Carmody and Robert Geoffrion, produced by Don Carmody and John Dunning, and executively produced by André Fleury and André Link. The film also features Jim Bailey, Michael Ironside, Marilyn Lightstone, Jonathan Welsh, Mark Burns and Vlasta Vrána. The music was composed by Daniel Lanois, the cinematography was done by François Protat, and the editing was done by Rit Wallis.

The film was released 2 November 1984 through Metro-Goldwyn-Mayer (MGM).

== Plot ==
A married couple, Frank and Lee, have problems with their sexual relationship. The psychotherapist recommends them to hire a mysterious woman who will give them new imaginations to restore their passion. Soon they find themselves drawn to a disastrous web of violence, insanity, and murder.

== Cast ==
- Art Hindle as Frank Waite
- Carole Laure as Anouk Van Derlin
- Shannon Tweed as Lee Waite
- Jim Bailey as Eric
- Michael Ironside as George Kyber
- Marilyn Lightstone as Dr. Foreman
- Jackie Burroughs as Woman At Anouk's
- Barbara Law as Maggie Simpson
- Jonathan Welsh as Brenner
- Ron Lea as Salesman

== Notes ==
- Pallister, Janis L. (1995). The Cinema of Québec: Masters in Their Own House. Fairleigh Dickinson Univ Press. p. 7. ISBN 0-8386-3562-8.
- Rist, Peter (2001). Guide to the Cinema(s) of Canada. Greenwood Publishing Group. ISBN 0-313-29931-5.
