= Nothing Personal (1980 film) =

1980 film by George Bloomfield

- Directed by: George Bloomfield
- Written by: Robert Kaufman
- Produced by: David Perlmutter
- Starring: Suzanne Somers; Donald Sutherland; Roscoe Lee Browne; Dabney Coleman; Lawrence Dane; Chief Dan George; John Dehner
- Cinematography: Lazlo George & Arthur Ibbetson
- Edited by: George Appleby
- Music by: Peter Mann
- Distributed by: American International Pictures (US)
- Release date: March 28, 1980
- Countries: Canada; United States
- Language: English

Nothing Personal is a 1980 Canadian-American romantic comedy film starring Suzanne Somers and Donald Sutherland. Sutherland plays a professor who objects to the killing of baby seals. Somers, a Harvard-educated attorney, tries to aid him.

== Premise ==
An environmentally concerned lawyer is hired to halt the construction on a breeding ground of endangered species of seals.

== Cast ==
- Donald Sutherland as Roger Keller
- Suzanne Somers as Abigail Adams
- Lawrence Dane as Ralston
- Roscoe Lee Browne as Paxton
- Dabney Coleman as Dickerson
- Sean McCann as Jake
- Chief Dan George as Oscar
- John Dehner as Senator
- David Steinberg as Talk Show Host
- Craig Russell as Talk Show Guest
- Sean Sullivan as Dean Collier
- Michael Wincott as Peter
- Catherine O'Hara as Audrey
- Douglas Campbell as Crichett Sr.
- Jonathan Welsh as Critchett Jr.
- Patricia Collins as Mrs. Ralston
- Maury Chaykin as Kanook
- Joe Flaherty as Patrol Car Policeman
- Eugene Levy as Marty
- Derek McGrath as Gas Jockey
- Tony Rosato as Pickup Truck Driver
- Angus MacInnes as Military Policeman
- Kate Lynch as Audrey Seltzer (uncredited)
- Saul Rubinek as Pete Braden (uncredited)

Numerous cast members of the Canadian comedy series SCTV turn up in bit parts in this film: Joe Flaherty, Eugene Levy, Catherine O'Hara (in her film debut) and Tony Rosato. This casting was entirely due to the connection with director George Bloomfield, who had directed SCTV from 1977 to 1979, and who brought the SCTV actors into the fold for this film. A similar casting situation occurred with Bloomfield's next film, Double Negative, released just two months after Nothing Personal.

== Reception ==
The film has been extremely poorly reviewed. Cinema Canada criticized the film's "coarse, obvious humour", "unfunny and unexciting" car chases, and claimed that the film's principal concern was "speed, not coherence". Leonard Maltin described Nothing Personal as an "inane romantic comedy", while TV Guide described the film as "tedious, witless, and implausible, with nonexistent direction and scythe-wielded editing." Even star Suzanne Somers wrote disparagingly of the film in her autobiography, claiming it quickly became apparent during filming that credited director George Bloomfield was in over his head. According to Somers, Donald Sutherland informally assumed direction of the actors as the making of the film continued.
