= Neil Munro (actor) =

Canadian actor

- Born: 1947; Musselburgh, Scotland
- Died: July 13, 2009 (aged 62–63); London, Ontario, Canada
- Occupations: Film director, actor and playwright

Neil Munro (1947–July 13, 2009) was a Scottish-born Canadian director, actor and playwright.

== Acting career ==
Born in Musselburgh, Scotland, Munro moved to Toronto at an early age. After graduating from the National Theatre School of Canada in 1967, he quickly established himself as one of the most compelling theatre actors in Canada, performing with Toronto Arts Productions, the National Arts Centre (where he played Hamlet, touring the role nationally), the Citadel Theatre, Theatre Calgary, Tarragon Theatre and the Toronto Free Theatre, as well as at the Shaw Festival and the Stratford Festival.

== Directing and writing ==
In 1985, Munro decided to retire permanently from acting for the stage, and to concentrate on directing and playwriting, appearing as an actor only occasionally on film, television and radio. His most notable appearances include The Jonah Look (which he also wrote), Beethoven Lives Upstairs (as Beethoven), John and the Missus and Dancing in the Dark (1986). His plays include Bob's Kingdom (Factory Theatre), Extreme Close Up (Toronto Free Theatre, 1980), an acclaimed adaptation of Shakespeare's Hamlet, entitled Hamlet's Room (Theatre Plus, 1991) and, for Shaw Festival in 2005, an adaptation of Georges Feydeau's C'est une femme du monde called Something on the Side.

== Shaw Festival ==
In the early 1990s, Munro was invited by Christopher Newton to become Resident Director at Shaw Festival. For that company he directed many acclaimed and often controversial productions of plays such as Misalliance, The Plough and the Stars, Chaplin (The Trial of Charles Spencer Chaplin, Esq.), Lord of the Flies, Counsellor-at-Law, Saint Joan, The Front Page, The Petrified Forest, Rashomon, Marsh Hay, The Seagull and all of The Shaw Festival's productions of Granville Barker's plays, including The Voysey Inheritance, The Marrying of Ann Leete, Rococo, Waste, The Secret Life, His Majesty and The Madras House. Munro also directed for most of the major English-language theatres in Canada, including Neptune Theatre, Stratford Festival, Citadel Theatre and Canadian Stage Company.

== Awards and achievements ==
Munro received a Best New Play Dora Award for Bob's Kingdom and a Best Director Dora Award for Hamlet's Room. He was also a Chalmers Award nominee for best new play for Extreme Close Up and, as an actor, has won two ACTRA awards.

== Personal life ==
Munro was married to the actress and painter Carole Galloway, who died in 2000; the couple had no children. Munro died in London, Ontario, after a lengthy struggle with cancer, on July 13, 2009.

== Filmography ==
Year	Title	Role	Notes
1982	Murder by Phone	Winters	
1986	Confidential	Hugh Jameson	
1986	Dancing in the Dark	Harry	
1986	In This Corner	Ambrose	
1986	The Last Season	Matt Keening	
1986	Mistress Madeleine	Charles	
1987	John and the Missus	Tom Noble	
1987	Street Justice	Marty Evanoff	
1988	Iron Eagle II	Edward Strappman	
1990	The Gate II: Trespassers	Art	
1992	Beethoven Lives Upstairs	Ludwig van Beethoven	
1993	Scales of Justice	Defense attorney	Episode "Regina v Truscott"
