= Miss Rose White =

- Genre: Drama
- Based on: A Shayna Maidel by Barbara Lebow
- Teleplay by: Anna Sandor
- Directed by: Joseph Sargent
- Starring: Kyra Sedgwick; Maximillian Schell; Amanda Plummer; D. B. Sweeney; Penny Fuller; Milton Selzer; Maureen Stapleton
- Theme music composer: Billy Goldenberg
- Country of origin: United States
- Original language: English

Production
- Executive producer: Marian Rees
- Producer: Anne Hopkins
- Production location: Richmond, Virginia
- Cinematography: Kees Van Oostrum
- Editor: Corky Ehlers
- Running time: 100 minutes
- Production companies: Hallmark Hall of Fame; Lorimar Television (Warner Bros. Television); Marian Rees Associates

Original release
- Network: NBC
- Release: April 26, 1992

Miss Rose White is a television film adaptation by Anna Sandor of the 1985 Barbara Lebow play A Shayna Maidel, starring Kyra Sedgwick. It first aired on April 26, 1992. The production received five Primetime Emmy Awards, including Outstanding Television Movie and Outstanding Supporting Actress in a Television Movie (Amanda Plummer), as well as the Humanitas Prize in the 90-minute category.

== Synopsis ==
Rose White is a modern young career woman in post-World War II New York City who has largely relegated her Jewish heritage to scrapbooks and memories. Born in Poland but fortunate enough to escape the country before the Nazi occupation and the Holocaust wiped out her family, Rose is stunned to learn her older sister, Lusia, somehow survived the horror and is coming to America. The sisters' reunion is complicated by Lusia's memories of her struggles to survive and the revelation of past family secrets.

== Cast ==
- Kyra Sedgwick as Reyzel Weiss / Rose White
- Amanda Plummer as Lusia Weiss
- Maximilian Schell as Mordecai Weiss
- Maureen Stapleton as Tanta Perla
- Penny Fuller as Miss Kate Ryan
- D. B. Sweeney as Dan McKay
- Gina Gershon as Angie
- Milton Selzer as Shimon

== Awards and nominations ==
Year	Award	Category	Nominee(s)	Result	Ref.
1992	Primetime Emmy Awards	Outstanding Made for Television Movie	Marian Rees, Andrea Baynes, Francine Lefrak & Anne Hopkins	Won	
1992	Primetime Emmy Awards	Outstanding Lead Actor in a Miniseries or a Special	Maximilian Schell	Nominated	
1992	Primetime Emmy Awards	Outstanding Supporting Actress in a Miniseries or a Special	Penny Fuller	Nominated	
1992	Primetime Emmy Awards	Outstanding Supporting Actress in a Miniseries or a Special	Amanda Plummer	Won	
1992	Primetime Emmy Awards	Outstanding Supporting Actress in a Miniseries or a Special	Maureen Stapleton	Nominated	
1992	Primetime Emmy Awards	Outstanding Individual Achievement in Directing for a Miniseries or a Special	Joseph Sargent	Won	
1992	Primetime Emmy Awards	Outstanding Individual Achievement in Writing for a Miniseries or a Special	Anna Sandor	Nominated	
1992	Primetime Emmy Awards	Outstanding Individual Achievement in Art Direction for a Miniseries or a Special	Fred Harpman & Robert Checchi	Nominated	
1992	Primetime Emmy Awards	Outstanding Individual Achievement in Cinematography for a Miniseries or a Special	Kees Van Oostrum	Nominated	
1992	Primetime Emmy Awards	Outstanding Individual Achievement in Hairstyling for a Miniseries or a Special	Terry Baliel	Won	
1993	Directors Guild of America Awards	Outstanding Directorial Achievement in Dramatic Specials	Joseph Sargent	Nominated	
1993	Golden Globe Awards	Best Miniseries or Motion Picture Made for Television		Nominated	
1993	Golden Globe Awards	Best Actress in a Miniseries or Motion Picture Made for Television	Kyra Sedgwick	Nominated	
1993	Golden Globe Awards	Best Supporting Actress in a Series, Miniseries or Motion Picture Made for Television	Amanda Plummer	Nominated	
1993	Humanitas Prize	90 Minute or Longer Network or Syndicated Television	Anna Sandor	Won	
1993	Writers Guild of America Awards	Adapted Long Form	Anna Sandor	Nominated	
