= Airwaves (TV series) =

- Starring: Roberta Maxwell; Ingrid Veninger; Roland Hewgill
- Country of origin: Canada
- Original language: English
- No. of seasons: 2
- No. of episodes: 26

Production
- Producers: John Frizzell; Michael MacMillan; Seaton McLean; Janice Platt
- Running time: 26 min
- Production company: Atlantis Films

Original release
- Network: CBC
- Release: 27 January 1986 – 8 June 1987

Airwaves is a Canadian comedy drama television series that aired on CBC Television in 1986 and 1987.

== Plot ==
The Toronto-filmed show stars Roberta Maxwell as Jean Lipton, a radio talk show host and widowed mother, who lives with her daughter Zoe, played by Ingrid Veninger, and her father Bob, played by Roland Hewgill. Maxwell has indicated that Canadian journalist-activist June Callwood was a basis for her portrayal of Jean.

The show's cast also includes Taborah Johnson, Alec Willows, and Kimble Hall. Writers for the series included Judith Thompson, John Frizzell, Susan Martin, Rob Forsythe, Linda Svendsen and Paul Gross.

== Production ==
Some of the early episodes were criticized as clunky, with Ross McLean of The Globe and Mail writing that the show seemed unsure of its identity, and even the producers later acknowledging that they had tried to fit too much into a half-hour show. The show was retooled slightly in its second season, with the writers getting a firmer grasp on the stories they wanted to tell and adding two new characters: Christopher Bolton in the role of Matt, Jean's nephew, and Patrick Rose as Dale, Jean's new coworker at the radio station. Critics responded favourably to the changes, with even McLean himself noting by 1987 that the show had significantly improved.

The show was modestly successful, with an average audience of 850,000 viewers per week in its first season. and 761,000 viewers in its second. Although the CBC was willing to order a third season, the producers decided to end the series as they felt it was better to move on to other projects than to continue tinkering with a show that wasn't getting the ratings they wanted. However, CBC subsequently reran the first two seasons, outside of prime time, in 1990.

The series was repeated on Vision TV from 1989 to 1991.

== Episodes ==
=== Season one ===
#	Title	Directed by	Written by	Original release date
1	"Pot Roast"	Unknown	Unknown	27 January 1986
2	"Blast from the Past"	Unknown	Unknown	3 February 1986
3	"Turkey"	Unknown	Unknown	10 February 1986
4	"Breakfast Man"	Unknown	Unknown	17 February 1986
5	"Angelfish"	Unknown	Unknown	24 February 1986
6	"Too Hot"	Unknown	Unknown	3 March 1986
7	"Chameleon"	Unknown	Unknown	10 March 1986
8	"The Runway"	Unknown	Unknown	17 March 1986
9	"Laundry"	Unknown	Unknown	24 March 1986
10	"Paul"	Unknown	Unknown	31 March 1986
11	"Fair Game"	Unknown	Unknown	7 April 1986
12	"Rockets"	Unknown	Unknown	14 April 1986
13	"On Air"	Unknown	Unknown	21 April 1986

=== Season two ===
#	Title	Directed by	Written by	Original release date
1	"Welcome Matt"	Scott Labarge	Unknown	2 March 1987
2	"Splashdown"	Unknown	Unknown	9 March 1987
3	"Cordon Blues"	Unknown	Unknown	16 March 1987
4	"Too Good to Be True"	Unknown	Unknown	23 March 1987
5	"Design for Living"	Unknown	Unknown	30 March 1987
6	"Scene from a Balcony"	Unknown	Unknown	6 April 1987
7	"Reunion"	Unknown	Unknown	13 April 1987
8	"Love Interests"	Unknown	Linda Svendsen	20 April 1987
9	"Happy Sixteenth"	Unknown	Dan Sexton	4 May 1987
10	"A Second Look"	Unknown	Unknown	18 May 1987
11	"Charge!"	Unknown	Unknown	25 May 1987
12	"The Write Stuff"	Unknown	Linda Svendsen	1 June 1987
13	"Dinner at Eight"	Unknown	Unknown	8 June 1987
