= Sheila McCarthy =

Canadian actress (born 1956)

- McCarthy in 2026
- Born: January 1, 1956 (age 70); Toronto, Ontario, Canada
- Occupation: Actress
- Years active: 1982–present
- Spouse: Peter Donaldson (m. 1986; died 2011)
- Children: 2

Sheila McCarthy (born January 1, (Note: Some sources say the 27th) 1956) is a Canadian actress and singer. She has worked in film, television, and on stage. McCarthy is one of Canada's most honoured actors, having won two Genie Awards (film), two Gemini Awards (television), an ACTRA Award, and two Dora Awards (theatre), along with multiple nominations.

== Early life ==
McCarthy was born in Toronto, Ontario on January 1, 1956. She attended Thornlea Secondary School in Thornhill in her youth. Her first appearance on stage was at Toronto's Elgin Theatre in Peter Pan when she was age six. She later attended the University of Victoria and spent a year studying with Uta Hagen at her HB Studio in New York City, and also workshopped with the Second City troupe in Toronto.

== Career ==
After several years of television work under her belt, McCarthy secured a role in the made-for-television movie A Nest of Singing Birds (1988), receiving early recognition for her talent with a Gemini Award nomination for Best Performance by a Lead Actress in a Dramatic Program. That year, she made her first notable impression on the Canadian movie scene as Polly, the quirky, "organizationally impaired girl" in Patricia Rozema's I've Heard the Mermaids Singing. For this role, McCarthy won the Genie Award for Best Actress. The film became wildly popular in Canada, earning many international and domestic awards and critical acclaim.

McCarthy has since become one of Canada's more honoured actors, having won two Genie Awards (film), two Gemini Awards (television), and two Dora Awards (theatre) along with multiple nominations.

She played Sarah Hamoudi in the Canadian television series Little Mosque on the Prairie (2007–2012), a role for which she was nominated for a Gemini award. One of her more recognized big-screen roles is Samantha, the news reporter in the movie Die Hard 2 with Bruce Willis. Her most recent roles are Connie Hendrix, mother of the clone Alison in series Orphan Black and Agnes Rofa in the series The Umbrella Academy.

She is also an accomplished voice-over actress, having performed characters voices in Free Willy, Mythic Warriors: Guardians of the Legend, The Busy World of Richard Scarry, The Neverending Story, Bad Dog and Marvin the Tap-Dancing Horse.

On stage, McCarthy has appeared in Little Shop of Horrors, Hamlet, Cabaret, Guys and Dolls, Anything Goes, and Love Letters.

== Personal life ==
McCarthy was married to actor Peter Donaldson from 1986 until his death in 2011. They have two daughters: Drew and Mackenzie Donaldson, who is also in show business (producer of Whatever, Linda and Orphan Black).

McCarthy is a spokesperson for The Quilt Project, a support group for families affected by breast cancer, and Canadian Feed the Children.

== Filmography ==
Film
Year	Title	Role	Notes
1987	I've Heard the Mermaids Singing	Polly Vandersma	won the Genie Award for Best Actress
1988	Gandahar	Council Spokeswoman (voice)	
1989	Friends, Lovers, & Lunatics	Kathy	
1989	George's Island	Miss Birdwood	
1990	Beautiful Dreamers	Molly Jessop	
1990	Die Hard 2	Samantha 'Sam' Coleman	
1990	Pacific Heights	Liz Hamilton	
1990	Bright Angel	Nina	
1991	White Room	Zelda	
1991	Paradise	Sally Pike	
1991	Stepping Out	Andy	
1991	Montréal vu par...	Ann Stuart	segment: "Desperanto"
1993	Journey to the Planets	Oracle (voice)	short film
1993	The Lotus Eaters	Diane Kingswood	won the Genie Award for Best Actress
1994	The Biggest Little Ticket	The Troll	
1996	House Arrest	Gwenna Krupp	
1997	Shadow Zone: My Teacher Ate My Homework	Mrs. Hackett	
2001	Rare Birds	Claire	
2002	Duct Tape Forever	Easterbrook (uncredited)	
2004	Confessions of a Teenage Drama Queen	Mrs. Gerard	
2004	The Day After Tomorrow	Judith	
2004	Being Julia	Grace Dexter	
2004	Geraldine's Fortune	Tina Larose	
2005	Bailey's Billion$	Peggy Delaney	
2005	The Multiple Selves of Hannah Maynard	Hannah Maynard	short film
2006	Small Avalanches	Nancy's Mother	short film
2007	Breakfast with Scot	Miss Patterson	
2007	The Stone Angel	Doris Shipley	
2009	Year of the Carnivore	Mrs. Smalls	
2012	Antiviral	Dev Harvey	
2014	A Fighting Man	Rose	
2016	Considering Love and Other Magic	Veronica Guest	
2016	Milton's Secret		
2017	Cardinals	Valerie Walker	
2018	Level 16	Mrs. Denison (cameo)	
2020	Stroke of Fate	Shirley	short film
2020	Happy Place	Joyce	
2020	Anything for Jackson	Audrey	
2021	Like a House on Fire	Katherine	
2021	The Middle Man	Mrs. Stout	
2022	Christmas in Rockwell	Juniper	
2022	Women Talking	Greta Loewen	
2024	All the Lost Ones	Dawn	
2025	The Well	Gabriel	Premiere at the 29th Fantasia International Film Festival on July 21, 2025 for its World Premiere.
2025	Dancing on the Elephant	Nora	
2026	Surfacing	Dawn	
2026	The Voices of Our Mother	Harriet	
TBA	Love is the Monster	Margaret	Filming

== Television ==
Television
Year	Title	Role	Notes
1982	Hangin' In		episode: "The Princess and the Pea"
1983	Today's Special	Sourpuss Sal	episode: "Smiles"
1984	The Littlest Hobo	Murielle	episode: "Three Monkeys of Bah Roghar: Part 1" episode: "Three Monkeys of Bah Roghar: Part 2"
1985	Love and Larceny	Mary Bigley	TV movie
1985	Tucker and the Horse Thief		TV movie
1986	9B	Heather	TV movie
1986	The Marriage Bed	Lynn Reilly	TV movie
1986	Hot Shots	Jenny	episode: "Cut Off in His Prime"
1986	The Frantics: Four on the Floor	Various Characters	6 episodes
1986	Really Weird Tales	Ellie Hutchins	episode: "Cursed with Charisma"
1986	Check It Out!	Sonja	episode: "Dog Day After Dark"
1987	Much Ado About Nothing	Margaret	TV movie
1988	Mount Royal	Luise Blaikie	episode: "Still Life"
1988	A Nest of Singing Birds	Anna	
1989	Alfred Hitchcock Presents	Sarah Hollister	episode: "For Art's Sake"
1989	Trying Times	Jenny Amber	episode: "A Good Life"
1990	Labour of Love		TV movie
1990	E.N.G.	Carol Barton	episode: "Till Death Us Do Part"
1990	Back to the Beanstalk	Garbanza	TV movie
1990	Steel Magnolias	Annelle Dupuy-Desoto	TV pilot (unsold)
1990	Street Legal	Stephanie Coleman	episode: "The Psychic"
1991	The Soulmates: The Gift of Light	(voice)	TV movie
1991	Rupert	Additional Voices	13 episodes
1991	The Hidden Room		episode: "Rogue in the Bathroom"
1992	Beethoven Lives Upstairs	Sophie	TV movie
1992	A Private Matter	Diane Callaghan	TV movie
1992	The Ray Bradbury Theater	Francine	episode: "The Lonely One"
1994	Free Willy	Annie	TV series
1994	Dan Redican Comedy Hour	Various	TV movie
1994	Menendez: A Killing in Beverly Hills	Jill Lansing	TV movie
1995	A Woman of Independent Means	Totsie	TV movie
1995	The Awakening	Nancy	TV movie
1995–1996	Picket Fences	Sue Walsh	4 episodes
1996	Road to Avonlea	Betty Blaine	episode: "King of the Great White Way"
1996	The Care and Handling of Roses	Carol Doster	TV movie
1997	The Adventures of Dudley the Dragon	Gabby Tree	TV series
1998	Bad Dog	Mrs. Potanski	TV series
1998	More Tales of the City	Mildred	TV miniseries
1998	Dead Husbands	Jane Armitage	TV movie
1998–2000	Emily of New Moon	Laura Murray	46 episodes
1999	You Know My Name	Mrs. Lynn	TV movie
1999	Too Rich: The Secret Life of Doris Duke	Tammy	TV movie
1999	Mythic Warriors	Clotho (voice)	episode: "Damon and Pythias"
2000	Virtual Mom	Holly	TV movie, also writer
2000	Super Rupert	Aunt Rhonda	TV series
2000	Marvin the Tap-Dancing Horse	Elizabeth the Emotional Pig (voice)	
2001	Haven	Eva	TV movie
2001	Anne of Green Gables: The Animated Series	Mrs. King (voice)	episode: "Oh, Brother!"
2001	Royal Canadian Air Farce	Anne Robinson/Dr. Joy Thomas	episode: "9.2"
2001	I Was a Rat	Mrs. Tapscrew	TV movie
2001	The Endless Grind	Various	TV series
2002	Lathe of Heaven	Penny	TV movie
2002	The Rats	Miss Paige	TV movie
2003	Custody of the Heart	Alice	TV movie
2003	Full-Court Miracle	Mrs. Klein	TV movie
2004	The Shields Stories	Hazel	episode: "Hazel"
2005	Puppets Who Kill	Miss Wickham	episode: "Cuddles the Artist"
2005	Missing	Dr. Eleanor Reese	episode: "Analysis"
2006	Roxana	Amy	TV movie
2006	Cow Belles	Fran Walker	TV movie
2007–2012	Little Mosque on the Prairie	Sarah Hamoudi	80+ episodes
2009	The Ron James Show		episode: "1.5"
2010	Love Letters	Melissa	TV movie
2013	Murdoch Mysteries	Felicity Dawes	episode: "Lovers in a Murderous Time"
2014	Saving Hope	Violet	episode: "Breathless"
2014	Dear Viola	Peggy	TV movie
2015	Orphan Black	Connie Hendrix	episode: "Community of Dreadful Fear and Hate"
2016	Ice Girls	Auntie Ginger	TV movie
2016	Brace for Impact	Faradee Gilchrist	TV movie
2018	The Detail	Helen Mailer	3 episodes
2019	Star Trek: Discovery	Amesha	episode: "New Eden"
2019	Anne with an E	Mrs. Blackmore	episode: "The Better Feelings of My Heart"
2019; 2024	The Umbrella Academy	Agnes	Recurring role (season 1); guest role (season 4)
2020	Nurses	Phillis Bruner	episode: "Friday Night Legend"
2021	The Good Doctor	Rose Babcock	episode: "Lim"
2022	Zombies 3	Grandma Angie/Alien Scout	TV movie
2025	The Copenhagen Test	Kate	2 episodes

== Discography ==
- 2006: "All Good Now" – from the movie Cow Belles

== Awards and nominations ==
This section needs to be expanded to include further awards and nominations.

Year	Nominated work	Organization	Award	Result
1983	Really Rosie	Dora Mavor Moore Award	Outstanding performance in a revue or musical	Won
1985	Little Shop of Horrors	Dora Mavor Moore Award	Female performance	Won
1988	I've Heard the Mermaids Singing	9th Genie Awards	Best Performance by an Actress in a Leading Role	Won
1988	A Nest of Singing Birds	3rd Gemini Awards	Best Performance by an Actress in a Leading Role in a Dramatic Program or Mini-Series	Nominated
1988	Mount Royal	3rd Gemini Awards	Best Guest Performance in a Series by an Actor or Actress	Nominated
1992	Bright Angel	Independent Spirit Awards	Best Supporting Female	Nominated
1993	The Lotus Eaters	14th Genie Awards	Best Performance by an Actress in a Leading Role	Won
1998	Emily of New Moon	13th Gemini Awards	Best Performance by an Actress in a Continuing Leading Dramatic Role	Won
1999	Emily of New Moon	14th Gemini Awards	Best Performance by an Actress in a Continuing Leading Dramatic Role	Nominated
2000	Sesame Park	15th Gemini Awards	Best Performance in a Pre-School Program or Series	Won
2000	The City	15th Gemini Awards	Best Performance by an Actress in a Guest Role Dramatic Series	Nominated
2018	Cardinals	ACTRA Toronto Award	Outstanding Performance, Female	Won
2023	Women Talking	Screen Actors Guild Award	Outstanding Performance by a Cast in a Motion Picture	Nominated
