= Ashleigh Aston Moore =

Canadian actress (1981–2007)

- Pictured in 1995
- Born: September 30, 1981; Canada
- Died: December 2007 (aged 26); Richmond, British Columbia, Canada
- Occupation: Actress
- Years active: 1992–1997

Ashleigh Aston Moore (September 30, 1981 – December 2007) was a Canadian child actress who played Chrissy in the 1995 film Now and Then.

== Life and career ==
Aston Moore was raised in Vancouver, Canada by her mother along with two younger brothers. She began acting at the age of six. Her first grade teacher encouraged her to get into the business of acting, noting that she was "very dramatic". After appearing in numerous commercials, Aston Moore landed the dual roles of Alpha and Donna in the CBC Television children's series The Odyssey in 1992. The show lasted three seasons, ending in 1994 with 39 episodes. She won the 6th Annual YTV Achievement Award in acting in 1995 for her work on The Odyssey. In 1993, Moore appeared in Family of Strangers.

Aston Moore's best known role was in the 1995 coming-of-age ensemble comedy-drama film Now and Then. Set in 1970, Aston Moore portrayed the child version of Christina "Chrissy" Dewitt, portrayed as an adult by Rita Wilson. She later guest starred on popular television shows such as Madison, Northern Exposure, and Strange Luck. Her final performance was in Touched by an Angel. Aston Moore made no further screen appearances after 1997.

In December 2007, Aston Moore died at the age of 26.

== Filmography ==
Year	Title	Type	Role	Notes
1992–1994	The Odyssey	television series	Alpha/Donna Archipenko	37 episodes; credited as Ashley Rogers
1993	Liar, Liar	made-for-television film	Jean "Nini" Farrow	credited as Ashley Rogers
1993	Family of Strangers	made-for-television film	Megan	credited as Ashley Rogers
1994	Sin and Redemption	made-for-television film	Sally Simms	credited as Ashley Rogers
1994	Beyond Obsession	made-for-television film	Traci at age 10	about the story of Traci Di Carlo
1994–1995	Madison	television series	Marnie Langston	1 episode
1995	Northern Exposure	television series	Tori Spencer	1 episode
1995	Now and Then	film	Chrissy DeWitt	
1995	Gold Diggers: The Secret of Bear Mountain	film	Tracy Briggs	
1996	The Grave	film	Marlene	
1996	Strange Luck	television series	Heather Rehne	1 episode
1996	A Friend's Betrayal	made-for-television film	Ella	
1997	Touched by an Angel	television series	Abby Fontaine	1 episode

== Awards and nominations ==
Year	Award	Category	Title of work	Result	Notes
1994	Gemini Award	Best Performance by an Actress in a Supporting Role	Family of Strangers	Nominated	
1995	YTV Achievement Award	YTV Achievement Award (Acting)	The Odyssey	Won	
1996	Young Artist Award	Best Performances by a Young Ensemble - Feature Film or Video	Now and Then (shared with cast)	Nominated	
