= Jonathan Welsh =

Canadian actor

- Born: April 7, 1947; Toronto, Ontario, Canada
- Died: January 7, 2005 (aged 57); Belleville, Ontario, Canada
- Years active: 1972–2002
- Spouse: Heather Welsh

Jonathan Welsh (April 3, 1947 – January 27, 2005) was a Canadian actor of stage, television and film, best known for his principal roles in Canadian television series, notably the 1986–1989 adventure comedy Adderly and the 1989–1994 journalism drama E.N.G..

== Career ==
On E.N.G., Welsh portrayed Eric "Mac" MacFarlane, one of the first openly gay characters in North American series television, a source of considerable pride for the actor.

He also appeared in the 1979 movie City on Fire which was Canada's attempt to enter the disaster movie era. The movie was a critical and box office failure. His other film credits included roles in Agency (1980), Nothing Personal (1980), All in Good Taste (1983) and The Surrogate (1984).

His acting career began in theatre in the 1960s, with roles at the Shaw and Stratford festivals and in the 1969 Canadian debut of Hair at the Royal Alexandra Theatre.

In 1990, Welsh founded Performers for Literacy, an acclaimed national charity that encourages children to read with interactive shows and readings, and with Second Story Reading Centres in Toronto and Edmonton.

== Personal life ==
Toward the end of his life, he moved from Toronto to Belleville, Ontario, where he died in his sleep after a short illness. He was survived by his wife Heather and three children, Hilary, Owen and Julia.

== Filmography ==
=== Film ===
Year	Title	Role	Notes
1976	Second Wind	Simon	
1977	Starship Invasions	Missile Officer	
1979	City on Fire	Herman Stover	
1980	Agency	Detective Ross	
1980	Nothing Personal	Critchett Jr.	
1983	All in Good Taste	Timothy	
1984	The Surrogate	Brenner	
1988	Switching Channels	Chaplain	
1990	Thick as Thieves	John Sphincter	

=== Television ===
Year	Title	Role	Notes
1972	Dr. Simon Locke	Sam Dawes	Episode: "The Assassin"
1974	The National Dream	A. B. Rogers	Episode: "The Sea of Mountains"
1975	King of Kensington	Technician	Episode: "Hot Line Host"
1976	Peep Show	Donald	Episode: "The Victim"
1976, 1977	Sidestreet	Glen Olsen	3 episodes
1980	The Great Detective	Henry Mason	Episode: "Spirit Guide"
1980	A Population of One	Harry	Television film
1980–1982	The Littlest Hobo	Various roles	4 episodes
1981	Escape from Iran: The Canadian Caper	Michael Howland	Television film
1985	The Edison Twins	Coach Neilson	Episode: "Mind and Body"
1986	Night Heat	Kelly	Episode: "Brotherhood"
1986	Mafia Princess	Dr. Towers	Television film
1986	Hangin' In	Chunky	Episode: "I Can't Help You But My Sister Can"
1986	The Magical World of Disney	Jerry	Episode: "Young Again"
1986	Danger Bay	Ned Kane	Episode: "Deep Peril"
1986	Unnatural Causes	Dr. Lester	Television film
1986–1988	Adderly	Melville Greenspan	44 episodes
1987	Street Legal	Immerman	Episode: "A Little Knowledge"
1988	T. and T.	Sloan	Episode: "Mickey's Choice"
1989	War of the Worlds	Jack Sawyer	Episode: "So Shall Ye Reap"
1989	Starting from Scratch	Jack Grady	Episode: "Me, the Jury"
1989–1994	E.N.G.		
1990	Hitler's Daughter	Zimmerman	Television film
1990	Dracula: The Series	Arthur Bauer	Episode: "The Vampire Solution"
1990	In Defense of a Married Man	D.A. Papernow	Television film
1990	Maniac Mansion	Agent Bower	Episode: "National Security Risk"
1992	The Great Diamond Robbery	Littlefield	Television film
1993	Secret Service	Hart	Episode: "Lone-Star Sting/The White Guard"
1993	Kung Fu: The Legend Continues	Bob Chandler	Episode: "Straitjacket"
1993	The Hidden Room	Professor	Episode: "Transfigured Night"
1994	Spenser: The Judas Goat	Felix	Television film
1994	Janek: The Silent Betrayal	Garrett	Television film
1996	F/X: The Series	Tasker	Episode: "Eye of the Dragon"
1998	Goosebumps	Mr. Lantz	Episode: "Awesome Ants"
1998	A Father for Brittany	Robert Lussier	Television film
1999	Total Recall 2070	Harry	2 episodes
1999	Psi Factor	Gavin Richter	Episode: "The Observer Effect"
1999	Milgaard	Calvin Tallis	Television film
1999	If You Believe	Dylan Lewis	Television film
2000	The Wonderful World of Disney	Park Policeman	Episode: "Santa Who?"
2002	Earth: Final Conflict	Prof. Simon Ruttledge	Episode: "Legacy"
