= Robert Wisden =

British actor

- Born: Robert Charles Wisden; 2 June 1958 (age 68); Brighton, East Sussex, England
- Occupation: Actor
- Years active: 1981–present
- Awards: Best Performance by an Actor in a Featured Supporting Role in a Dramatic Program or Mini-Series; 2000 The Sheldon Kennedy Story

Robert Charles Wisden (Brighton, 2 June 1958) is an English actor who has an extensive career in Canadian and American film and television, for which he has won a Gemini Award for Best Performance by an Actor in a Featured Supporting Role in a Dramatic Program or Mini-series for The Sheldon Kennedy Story at the 15th Gemini Awards in 2000. Best known for playing U.S. President Richard Nixon in the 2009 American neo-noir superhero film Watchmen, he has acted on many series, including Da Vinci's Inquest, Smallville, The X-Files, Battlestar Galactica, Buffy the Vampire Slayer, Highlander, and Jeremiah.

== Early life ==
Born in 1958 in Brighton, East Sussex, England, Robert Wisden moved with his family from Britain to Canada when he was 15. He made his film debut in Firebird 2015 AD (1981), landing a key supporting part alongside Darren McGavin and Doug McClure. Four years later, he started his television career starring as Terry Dunne in Atom Egoyan's In This Corner (1986).

== Career ==
=== Acting ===
Wisden is best known for his role as United States President Richard Nixon in Zack Snyder's 2009 film adaptation of the DC graphic novel Watchmen, Chief Coroner James Flynn in the Canadian TV series Da Vinci's Inquest, and Ken Browning in Final Destination. In 1994, he landed a supporting role in the epic turn-of-the-20th-century drama Legends of the Fall. He played Robert Patrick Modell - a character created by Vince Gilligan - in the classic The X-Files third-season episode "Pusher" (1996) and the 1998 fifth-season follow-up episode "Kitsunegari".

=== Teaching ===
In 2006, Wisden graduated from Simon Fraser University with a bachelor of education degree. He taught at Heritage Woods Secondary School for two school years (2006–2007), substituting for the main drama teacher. He went on to become the head of theater arts at St. George's School for Boys in Vancouver, British Columbia. In 2019, Wisden realised a long-held dream when he oversaw the school's successful production of Les Misérables.

== Awards ==
In 2000, Wisden won a Gemini Award for Best Performance by an Actor in a Featured Supporting Role in a Dramatic Program or Mini-Series for The Sheldon Kennedy Story (1999) at the 15th Gemini Awards.

== Filmography ==
=== Film ===
- Firebird 2015 AD (1981) - Cam
- Milk and Honey (1988)
- Blood Clan (1990) - Stuart Roos
- Stay Tuned (1992) - 3 Men and Rosemary's Baby
- Impolite (1992) - Jack Yeats
- Look Who's Talking Now (1993) - Ranger
- Legends of the Fall (1994) - John T. O'Banion
- The War Between Us (1996) - Ed Parnum
- Excess Baggage (1997) - Detective Sims
- Medusa's Child (1997) - Colonel Spencer
- Floating Away (1998) - Armand
- In the Name of the People (2000) - DA Paul McMillan
- Final Destination (2000) - Ken Browning
- Criss Cross (2001) - Zach
- Snow Queen (2002) - Wolfgang
- Watchmen (2009) - Richard Nixon
- Driven to Kill (2009) - Terry Goldstein

=== Television ===
- In This Corner (1986) - Terry Dunne
- Glory Enough for All (1988) - Charles Best
- 9B (1989) - Bob Dawson
- The Odyssey (1993–1994) - Brad Ziegler
- The Outer Limits (1995–1999) - Justin Wells / Sam Winter
- Highlander: The Series "The Return of Amanda" (1993) & "The Messenger" (1996) - Col. William Everett Culbraith / Werner
- The X-Files (1996–1998) - Robert Patrick Modell
- Poltergeist: The Legacy (1997–1999) - Will Thomas / James Donlon
- Madison (1997) - Richard Long
- Stargate SG-1 (1997–2005) (4 episodes) - Lt. Colonel Bert Samuels
- Millennium (1997–1998) - Chris Carmody / Gordon Roberts
- Cold Squad (1998–2004) - Nick Kingsman / Neil Brice
- Welcome to Paradox (1998) - John Hammond
- Da Vinci's Inquest (1998–2000) - Chief Coroner James Flynn
- Secret Cutting (2000) - Russell Cottrell
- Smallville (2001–2004) - Gabriel Sullivan
- Jeremiah (2002–2003) - Devon
- The Elizabeth Smart Story (2003) - Jim Smart
- Battlestar Galactica (2005) - Wallace Gray
- Supervolcano (2005) - Kenneth Wylie
