= Adderly =

1986 Canadian television series

- Created by: Elliott Baker, based on his novel Pocock & Pitt
- Starring: Winston Rekert; Jonathan Welsh; Dixie Seatle; Ken Pogue
- Country of origin: Canada
- No. of seasons: 2
- No. of episodes: 44

Production
- Production location: Toronto
- Running time: 60 minutes
- Production companies: Global Television Network; JayGee Productions; Robert Cooper Productions

Original release
- Network: Global
- Release: September 24, 1986 – March 9, 1988

Adderly is a Canadian television adventure-drama series which aired from 1986 to 1988. It was broadcast on both Canadian TV and on CBS in the United States. It starred Vancouver-born Winston Rekert as "charming and witty V. H. Adderly," an operative working for an obscure government intelligence agency.

== Background ==
Adderly was based on series creator Elliott Baker's novel, Pocock & Pitt.

== Cast ==
- Winston Rekert as V. H. (Virgil Homer) Adderly
- Jonathan Welsh as Melville Greenspan
- Dixie Seatle as Mona Ellerby
- Ken Pogue as Major Jonathan B. Clack

Occasional:

- Mairlyn Smith as Debbie Greenspan
- Jack Leitch as Victor Barinov

== Plot ==
V. H. Adderly (Rekert) is a secret agent for an organization known as the I.S.I (International Security and Intelligence). Before the series begins, an enemy agent, Victor Barinov, crushes Adderly's left hand with a medieval mace during an interrogation in East Germany. Adderly loses the use of the hand, and since he is no longer considered useful as an active agent, he is reassigned to the I.S.I.'s tiny Department of Miscellaneous Affairs, located in a small basement office. This is meant to be a sort of "good service" reward for Adderly, as his supposedly cushy Miscellaneous Affairs job is mostly concerned with mundane in-house administrative paperwork. During the series, Adderly consistently finds ways to use his vague, non-specific status as a representative of "Miscellaneous Affairs" to actively investigate anything the I.S.I. has overlooked, and regularly goes above and beyond his mundane duties to uncover and neutralize dread plots that the larger organization has failed to investigate.

Miscellaneous Affairs is officially run by Melville Greenspan (Welsh), a man fastidiously devoted to bureaucracy and unwilling to allow Adderly the freedom to pursue his outside interests. The only other departmental staff member is Mona Ellerby (Seatle), Greenspan's over-qualified secretary who is addicted to adventure and romance novels. Greenspan's superior is Major Jonathan B. Clack (Pogue), who is in charge of the I.S.I. as a whole, and is responsible for Adderly's reassignment from active field operations to Miscellaneous Affairs.

Through the course of the 44-episode run, Adderly repeatedly demonstrates his ability to perform the duties of an active field agent, even saving the life of Major Clack himself. This only confirms to Clack that Adderly is an important asset at his current post. It is implied that Clack may have created the Department of Miscellaneous Affairs to allow Adderly the freedom and flexibility to pursue various cases which the I.S.I. couldn't normally handle.

== Episodes ==
=== Season 1 (1986–87) ===
No. overall	No. in season	Title	Directed by	Written by	Original release date
1	1	"Hit-Man Complex"	Don McBrearty	Elliott Baker	September 24, 1986
2	2	"Mailman"	Gilbert Shilton	Robert Arnott	October 1, 1986
3	3	"Critical Mass"	Paul Shapiro	Aubrey Solomon	October 8, 1986
4	4	"A Change of Mind"	Joseph L. Scanlan	Len Janson & Chuck Menville	October 15, 1986
5	5	"Backfire"	Gilbert Shilton	Alfred Harris	October 22, 1986
6	6	"Rich Kid"	Randy Bradshaw	Elliott Baker	October 29, 1986
7	7	"Capture the Flag"	Charles Dennis	Charles Dennis	November 5, 1986
8	8	"Nina Who?"	Timothy Bond	Carl Binder	November 12, 1986
9	9	"The Dancing Lesson"	William Corcoran	Elliott Baker	November 19, 1986
10	10	"Adderly with Eggroll"	Peter Rowe	Tony Sheer	November 26, 1986
11	11	"Brotherly Love"	Bruce Pittman	Jaron Summers	December 3, 1986
12	12	"Secrets of the Sun"	William Corcoran	Jim Osborne	January 7, 1987
13	13	"A Matter of Discretion"	F. Harvey Frost	Judith Thompson	January 14, 1987
14	14	"Nemesis"	Timothy Bond	Carl Binder	February 4, 1987
15	15	"Year of the Tiger"	Alan Simmonds	Jim Henshaw	February 11, 1987
16	16	"Who Do, Voodoo"	William Corcoran	Ken Gass	February 18, 1987
17	17	"Miscellaneous News"	Timothy Bond	Guy Mullally & Gregor Hutchison	February 25, 1987
18	18	"Tiers of Interment"	George Bloomfield	Carl Binder	March 4, 1987
19	19	"Running Backward"	Stefan Scaini	Story by : Carol Bolt & Carl Binder; Teleplay by : Carl Binder	April 8, 1987
20	20	"Class of '87"	Timothy Bond	Don Mankiewicz	April 29, 1987
21	21	"Mirror Man"	Jorge Montesi	Jim Henshaw	May 13, 1987
22	22	"A Far, Far Better Thing"	Rene Bonniere	Peter Lauterman & Angelo Stea	May 27, 1987

=== Season 2 (1987–88) ===
No. overall	No. in season	Title	Directed by	Written by	Original release date
23	1	"Speed of Light"	George Bloomfield	Glenn Norman	August 7, 1987
24	2	"Run to Darkness"	Jorge Montesi	Jim Henshaw	August 14, 1987
25	3	"Eye in the Sky"	Joseph L. Scanlan	Carl Binder	August 21, 1987
26	4	"To Better Days"	Joseph L. Scanlan	Johnny Segura & Alan Zweig	August 28, 1987
27	5	"Blood Feud"	George Bloomfield	Jim Henshaw	September 4, 1987
28	6	"The Perils of Mona"	Timothy Bond	Carl Binder	September 11, 1987
29	7	"Midnight in Morocco"	George Bloomfield	Denis Gibson & Kevin Scanlon	September 30, 1987
30	8	"The Bridge"	Don McBrearty	Peter Lauterman & Angelo Stea	October 7, 1987
31	9	"Headhunter"	Don McBrearty	Jim Henshaw	October 14, 1987
32	10	"Code Name: Chipmunk"	Stefan Scaini	Peter Haynes	October 28, 1987
33	11	"Spymaster"	Bruce Pittman	David Cole	November 11, 1987
34	12	"Requiem"	George Bloomfield	Carl Binder	November 18, 1987
35	13	"Horse Cents"	George Bloomfield	Jerome McCann	November 25, 1987
36	14	"Debbie Does Dishes"	Bruce Pittman	Douglas Rodger	December 2, 1987
37	15	"The Man Who Didn't Know Too Much"	John Bell	Carl Binder	December 9, 1987
38	16	"Deathwatch"	George Bloomfield	Jim Henshaw	December 23, 1987
39	17	"Covert Agenda"	George Bloomfield	Lyle Slack	January 20, 1988
40	18	"The Game"	Brad Turner	Peter Lauterman & Angelo Stea	February 10, 1988
41	19	"Adventures in Bodysitting"	George Bloomfield	Carl Binder	February 17, 1988
42	20	"The Interrogation"	Bruce Pittman	Ian Adams	February 24, 1988
43	21	"See How They Die"	John Bell	Angel Savage	March 2, 1988
44	22	"Point of No Return"	George Bloomfield	Jim Henshaw	March 9, 1988

== Broadcast history ==
Adderly aired from September 1986 through May 1987 (its first season) in the 11:30pm CBS Late Night slot on the CBS network. For the second season (beginning in August 1987), the show's popularity prompted CBS to run episodes in prime time at 10:00pm on Fridays, but there was little promotion and the show didn't do well in the ratings. CBS moved the show back to the 11:30pm time slot in September 1987 where it remained until the series ended. That following summer the series was rerun on Mondays/Wednesdays at 1:00am. Canadian broadcasts of the series did not commence until January 1987 on Global TV in Ontario and in first-run syndication elsewhere in Canada.
