= In the Name of the People (2000 film) =

- Written by: Tim Boland; Richard Leder
- Directed by: Peter Levin
- Starring: Amy Madigan; Richard Thomas; Scott Bakula
- Music by: Mark Snow
- Country of origin: United States
- Original language: English

Production
- Producer: Lisa Richardson
- Cinematography: Nikos Evdemon
- Editor: Ron Yoshida
- Running time: 96 minutes

Original release
- Network: CBS
- Release: February 2, 2000

In the Name of the People is an American television movie drama. It was released in 2000 by CBS Productions and Jaffe/Braunstein Films. The movie was filmed in Vancouver, British Columbia, Canada. It was based on the play by Tim Boland.

== Plot ==
The movie focuses on the Murphy family, whose daughter was murdered by John Burke. Sentenced to death, the man realises that his daughter will become an orphan. Unexpectedly he asks the Murphys to care for her.

== Cast ==
- Amy Madigan as Connie Murphy
- Richard Thomas as Jack Murphy
- Kimberley Warnat as Jenny Murphy
- Samantha Joy as Young Jenny Murphy
- Scott Bakula as John Burke
- Robin Anne Phipps as Lisa Burke
- Mary Black as Lynette Burke
- Gillian Barber as Counselor
- Robert Wisden as DA Paul McMillan
- Mark Mullan as Cruel child #1
- Hailey Jenkins as Cruel child #2
- Clay St. Thomas as Reporter
- Max Teichman as Teacher
- Guy Villeneuve as Reporter
- Bonnie Smart as Secretary
- Cameron K. Smith as Death Penalty Protester
