= Constance Beresford-Howe =

Canadian novelist (1922–2016)

Constance Beresford-Howe (10 November 1922 – 20 January 2016) was a Canadian novelist.

== Biography ==
Constance Beresford-Howe was born in 1922 in Montreal and graduated from McGill University with an BA and MA, and from Brown University, where she completed a Ph.D. in 1950. She taught English literature and creative writing at McGill in Montreal and Ryerson University in Toronto until her retirement in 1988.

Beresford-Howe published ten novels between 1946 and 1991. The Book of Eve (1973), her best-known novel, tells the story of a 65-year-old woman who leaves her demanding husband for the freedom to live the way she wants. The stage version, Eve, by Larry Fineberg, premiered at the Stratford Festival in 1976.

Two of Beresford-Howe's novels, A Population of One and The Marriage Bed, were made into television films for CBC Television.

== Bibliography ==
=== Novels ===
- The Unreasoning Heart (1946)
- Of This Day's Journey (1947)
- The Invisible Gate (1949)
- Lady Greensleeves (1955)
- The Book of Eve (1973)
- A Population of One (1976)
- The Marriage Bed (1981)
- Night Studies (1985)
- Prospero's Daughter (1988)
- A Serious Widow (1991)
