= Roland Hewgill =

Canadian actor

- Born: February 11, 1929; Montreal, Quebec, Canada
- Died: November 9, 1998 (aged 69)
- Occupation: Actor
- Years active: 1955-1993

Roland Hewgill (February 11, 1929 – November 9, 1998) was a Canadian actor. Primarily a stage actor, most famously associated with the Stratford Festival, he also had a number of film and television roles.

Born in Montreal, Quebec and raised primarily in Kingston, Ontario, Hewgill joined the Stratford Festival in 1954. Roles he played at Stratford over the course of his career included Antonio in The Merchant of Venice, Uncle Ben in Death of a Salesman, Ferdinand in The Duchess of Malfi, Jaques in As You Like It, Cornwall in King Lear and Creon in Oedipus Rex. His roles for other theatres included Phil Hogan in A Moon for the Misbegotten, Relling in The Wild Duck, Dr. Rank in A Doll's House and Andrey Bottvinik in A Walk in the Woods.

He won a Dora Mavor Moore Award as Best Actor in a Featured Role in 1986 for his performance in A Moon for the Misbegotten, and was a shortlisted nominee as Actor in a Principal Role in a Play in 1988 for Play Memory.

On television he was most noted for his role as Bob Lipton in the comedy-drama series Airwaves, and in film he appeared in John and the Missus and Beautiful Dreamers. He was a shortlisted Genie Award nominee for Best Supporting Actor at the 8th Genie Awards in 1987 for John and the Missus.

== Filmography ==
Year	Title	Role	Notes
1957	Oedipus Rex	Chorus	
1986	Airwaves	Bob Lipton	
1987	John and the Missus	Fred Budgell	
1989	The Midday Sun	Watson	
1990	Beautiful Dreamers	Timothy Pardee	
