= Charlotte Arnold =

Canadian actress

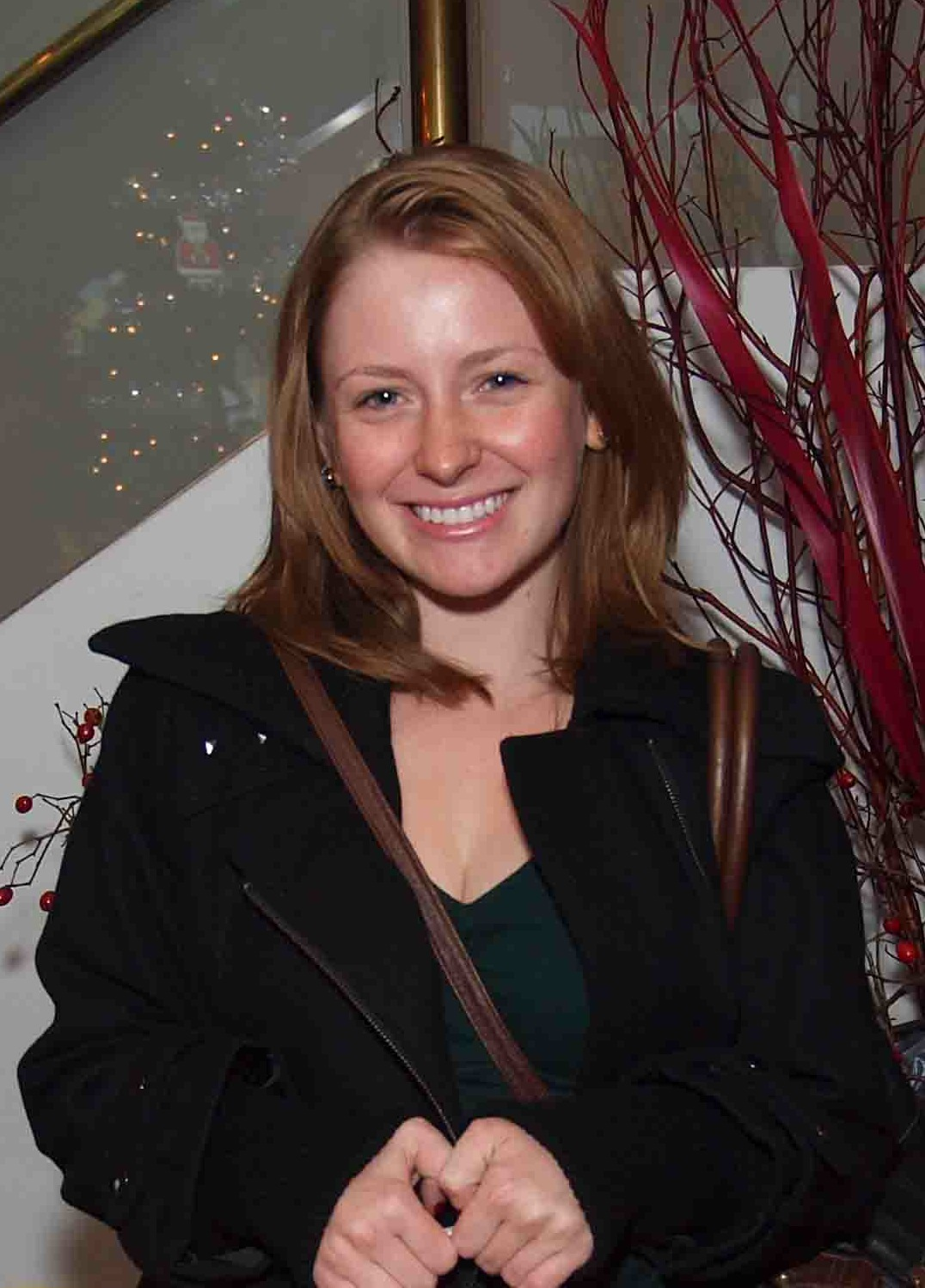
- Arnold at the 2010 Gemini Awards
- Occupation: Actress
- Years active: 1996–present
- Children: 1

Charlotte Arnold is a Canadian actress. She is best known for her roles as Sadie Hawthorne in Naturally, Sadie and Holly J. Sinclair in Degrassi: The Next Generation, for which she won a Gemini Award for Best Performance in a Children's or Youth Program or Series in 2010.

== Early life ==
Arnold grew up in Toronto.

== Career ==
Arnold began modeling and acting at age 4; her earliest works included a Tiger Electronics television commercial (with future Degrassi co-star Jake Goldsbie) and an appearance in the Sears catalog. Her first credited acting role was Kate O'Neil in the 1996 made-for-TV movie Giant Mine. Then after a few minor roles, she had a role in the movie Custody of the Heart for which she was nominated for the 2001 Young Artist Award for Best Performance in a TV Movie (Comedy or Drama) for a Young Actress Age Ten or Under. In 2001, she lent her voice to the television series Committed. Over the next few years, she had roles in a few more made-for-TV movies, such as Harlan County War, One Kill, Range of Motion, and Jewel.

Arnold's career expanded in the mid-2000s. Beginning in 2005, she starred for three seasons as the title character of the popular Family Channel series Naturally, Sadie until 2007. From 2008 until 2012, she played Holly J. Sinclair on Degrassi.

In 2010, she won a Gemini Award for Best Performance in a Children's or Youth Program or Series, in a season 9 episode of Degrassi.

Arnold attended Ryerson University, majoring in broadcast journalism. She currently works as an editorial assistant for CBC News Network.

== Personal life ==
On August 6, 2021, Arnold gave birth to her first child, a daughter Jane.

== Filmography ==
=== Films ===
Year	Title	Role	Notes
1996	Giant Mine	Kate O'Neil	TV movie
2000	Custody of the Heart	Kiki Raphael	TV movie
2000	Harlan County War	Lucinda Kincaid	TV movie
2000	One Kill	Callie O'Malley	TV movie
2000	Range of Motion	Sarah Berman	TV movie
2001	Jewel	Annie Hillburn (age 7–11)	TV movie
2001	The Safety of Objects	Sally Christianson	
2002	Time of the Wolf	Paige McGuire	
2007	They Come Back	Megan Belleflower	TV movie
2008	Degrassi in Ecuador	Self	TV movie
2009	Degrassi Goes Hollywood	Holly J. Sinclair	TV movie
2010	Degrassi Takes Manhattan	Holly J. Sinclair	TV movie
2010	Degrassi in India	Self	TV movie
2011	Degrassi in Haiti	Self	TV movie
2011	Her Eyes	Charlotte	Short film
2016	Deadly Inferno	Alex	TV movie
TBA	Tasting Love	Anna	

=== Television ===
Year	Title	Role	Notes
1997	Earth: Final Conflict	Little Girl	Episode: "Decision"
2000	Real Kids, Real Adventures	Holli	Episode: "Amy to the Rescue: The Amy Toole Story"
2000	Anne of Green Gables: The Animated Series	Victoria (voice)	Episode: "One True Friend"
2001	Committed	Zelda Larsen (voice)	TV series; voice role
2004	Zixx Level One	Sarah Mills	Episodes: "Four's a Crowd", "Revenge Is Sweet"
2005-2007	Naturally, Sadie	Sadie Hawthorne	Lead role; 65 episodes
2007-2010	Degrassi: Minis	Holly J. Sinclair	22 episodes
2003, 2007-2012	Degrassi: The Next Generation	Holly J. Sinclair	Uncredited appearance (season 3), Main role (seasons 7-11), Guest Star (season 11)
2015	Beauty & the Beast	Marissa Zane	Episode: "The Beast of Wall Street"
2015-2017	Patriot	Ally O'Dhonaill	8 episodes
2016	Degrassi: Next Class	Holly J. Sinclair	Episode: "#ThrowbackThursday"
2017	Private Eyes	Jen	Episode: "The Extra Mile"
2018	Frankie Drake Mysteries	Ms. Frost/Margie Hunt	Episode: "The Pilot"

== Awards and nominations ==
Young Artist Awards

- 2001 – Best Performance in a TV Movie (Comedy or Drama): Young Actress Age Ten or Under for Custody of the Heart (Nominated)

Gemini Awards

- 2010 – Best Performance in a Children's or Youth Program or Series: Degrassi: The Next Generation (Won)
