= Mason Township, Marion County, Missouri =

Township in Marion County, Missouri, U.S.

Coordinates: 39.6986°N 91.3725°W

Mason Township is an inactive township in Marion County, in the U.S. state of Missouri.

Mason Township was established in 1827, taking its name from nearby Fort Mason.
