= John Frizzell (screenwriter) =

Canadian screenwriter

John B. Frizzell (born in Kingston, Ontario) was a Canadian screenwriter.

After several years writing, directing and co-producing the documentary series A Different Understanding for TVOntario, Frizzell joined partners Niv Fichman, Barbara Willis Sweete and Larry Weinstein to found the Canadian production company Rhombus Media. He left Rhombus in the mid-eighties to pursue a career in writing.

His credits include the television series Airwaves, The Rez, Twitch City, Angela Anaconda and Material World and the films A Winter Tan, Getting Married in Buffalo Jump, Life with Billy, Dance Me Outside, On My Own and Lapse of Memory. He was co-winner of a Writers Guild of Canada Award for Lucky Girl.

== Filmography ==
Writer
Year	Film	Genre	Notes
2001	Lucky Girl	Teleplay	
1999	Angela Anaconda	TV series	
1998	Twitch City	TV series	
1994	Dance Me Outside	Film	
1994	Life with Billy	TV	
1993	On My Own	Film	
1992	Lapse of Memory	Dialogue	
1990	Getting Married in Buffalo Jump	TV	
1989	Carnival of Shadows	TV	
1987	A Winter Tan	TV	
