= In This Corner (1986 film) =

- Written by: Paul Gross
- Directed by: Atom Egoyan
- Starring: Robert Wisden; Patrick Tierney
- Music by: Eric Robertson
- Country of origin: Canada
- Original language: English

Production
- Producer: Alan Burke
- Cinematography: Kenneth W. Gregg
- Editor: Myrtle Virgo
- Running time: 60 minutes
- Production company: Canadian Broadcasting Corporation

Original release
- Network: CBC Television
- Release: February 2, 1986

In This Corner is a 1986 Canadian television film, directed by Atom Egoyan. The film stars Robert Wisden as Terry Dunne, an amateur boxer from Canada who becomes an unwitting pawn in The Troubles when he is convinced by Irish Republican Army operatives to help smuggle accused terrorist Ryan Shaw (Patrick Tierney) back into Ireland as part of his entourage when he travels there for a title bout.

The film's cast also includes Neil Munro, Brenda Bazinet, Cedric Smith, Sean McCann and Stephen Ouimette.

The film aired on CBC Television on February 2, 1986. The film received a Gemini Award nomination for Best Short Drama at the 1st Gemini Awards.
