= The Book of Eve =

1973 novel by Constance Beresford-Howe

- Cover
- Author: Constance Beresford-Howe
- Language: English
- Publisher: MacMillan
- Publication date: 1973
- Publication place: Canada
- Pages: 191

The Book of Eve is a 1973 novel by Constance Beresford-Howe. It follows the life of Eva Carroll a middle-class spouse who suddenly leaves her well-to-do life in west Montreal for a solitary life in a lower class east Montreal rooming house.

== Synopsis ==
Eva Carroll is a middle-class matron living a comfortable life in the west Montreal neighbourhood of Notre-Dame-de-Grâce. In her 66th year she suddenly leaves everything to live in a dingy basement apartment of a seedy rooming house. The story follows her new life experience of poverty and her struggle for existence on the streets of Montreal interspersed with flashbacks of her former life. At first she is astonished by her audacious move, but gradually realizes that this is the first time in her life that she has made an independent decision reconciling herself with a deeper sense of individualistic anarchy. She gains a younger lover, despite his infidelity, sticks with him as a testament to her personal choice, rather than what her former social life would expect of her.

== Reception ==
In an obituary, the Globe and Mail rated The Book of Eve as Beresford-Howe's most popular novel. John Moss praised the novel calling the character Eva heroic, a strident voice for feminism and personal freedom as any character in Canadian literature.

The book was adapted as a stage play called Eve which debuted at the Stratford Festival in 1976.
