= Anna Sandor =

Hungarian-born Canadian-American screenwriter (1949–2025)

- Born: March 4, 1949; Budapest, Hungary
- Died: November 1, 2025 (aged 76); La Jolla, California, U.S.
- Occupation: Film and television screenwriter
- Spouse: William Gough (m. 1982; div. 1996)

Anna Sandor (March 4, 1949 – November 1, 2025) was a Hungarian-born Canadian-American film and television screenwriter. Sandor began her career as an actress, becoming a writer in her mid-twenties. Her films garnered numerous major awards, including multiple Emmy nominations, three Humanitas Prizes, the Writers Guild of America Award and the Gemini Award. She also won the Margaret Collier Award for lifetime achievement in the Canadian industry.

== Life and career ==
Sandor was born on March 4, 1949, in Budapest, Hungary, to Holocaust survivors Paul and Agnes Sandor. She was a graduate of Harbord Collegiate Institute and the School of Dramatic Art at the University of Windsor.

Her Canadian credits include the television films A Population of One (1980), The Running Man (1981), Charlie Grant's War (1985), The Marriage Bed (1986), Mama's Going to Buy You a Mockingbird (1987) and Two Men (1988), and episodes of the television series King of Kensington, Flappers, Seeing Things and Hangin' In, a sitcom she co-created that ran for seven seasons. She moved to the United States in 1989. Her American movies for television include Miss Rose White (Emmy winner); Amelia Earhart: The Final Flight (starring Diane Keaton); My Louisiana Sky (Emmy winner) and many other notable films.

Sandor married William Gough in 1982. They divorced in 1996. Sandor lived in San Diego, California. She died of complications from melanoma in La Jolla, California, on November 1, 2025, at the age of 76.
