= Eric Till =

English film director

- Born: 24 November 1929 (age 96); London, England
- Occupations: Film director, television director

Eric Till (born 24 November 1929) is an English film and television director working in Canada, the United States, and Europe since the 1960s. His 1977 film It Shouldn't Happen to a Vet was entered into the 10th Moscow International Film Festival. He also directed Hot Millions (1968), The Walking Stick (1970), and To Catch A Killer (1992), as well as some Jim Henson productions, including episodes of Fraggle Rock (1984-1987) and the television special The Christmas Toy (1986).

== Career ==
After directing for the Armchair Theatre and Wednesday Play series' in the UK, Till emigrated to Canada in Toronto. He has directed numerous Canadian and American TV films from the 1960s onwards, including An American Christmas Carol, A Nest of Singing Birds, Getting Married in Buffalo Jump, and To Catch a Killer, starring Brian Dennehy as psychopathic serial killer John Wayne Gacy.

Films Till has directed include A Great Big Thing, Hot Millions, A Fan's Notes, It Shouldn't Happen to a Vet, Bethune, Wild Horse Hank, Improper Channels, Voices from Within (also known as Silhouette), Bonhoeffer: Agent of Grace, Luther and the Muppet television series and specials Fraggle Rock, The Christmas Toy and A Muppet Family Christmas. His work for the Canadian Broadcasting Corporation (CBC) included some of the following: the mini-series of Pierre Berton's The National Dream, a movie of Brian Friel's Freedom of the City, Katherine Anne Porter's Pale Horse, Pale Rider, Marghanita Laski's The Offshore Island, John Hopkins's Talking to a Stranger, the television films Shocktrauma, Turning to Stone and Win, Again!, two episodes of the legal docudrama anthology series Scales of Justice, and the mini-series Glory Enough for All about the discoverers of insulin.

Till has directed performances of the National Ballet of Canada, the Bolshoi Ballet, and the Royal Winnipeg Ballet for television as well as the final concert of the conductor Sir Thomas Beecham.

In 2005, Till was awarded the Governor General's Performing Arts Award for Lifetime Artistic Achievement, Canada's highest honour in the performing arts, by Governor General Adrienne Clarkson. On 12 August 2008, it was announced that Till would be receiving the 2008 Directors Guild of Canada Lifetime Achievement Award.
