= Beethoven Lives Upstairs =

Canadian film

- Based on: Work of the same name by Barbara Nichol
- Screenplay by: Heather Conkie
- Directed by: David Devine
- Starring: Neil Munro; Illya Woloshyn; Fiona Reid; Paul Soles; Albert Schultz; Sheila McCarthy
- Music by: Ludwig van Beethoven
- Country of origin: Canada
- Original language: English

Production
- Executive producer: Terence Robinson
- Producers: David Devine; Richard Mozer
- Cinematography: David Perrault
- Editor: Rik Morden
- Running time: 51 minutes

Original release
- Network: HBO
- Release: 1992

Beethoven Lives Upstairs is a 1992 HBO Original Film produced and directed by David Devine. Based on a very popular children's audio recording written and directed by Barbara Nichol, the film stars Illya Woloshyn as Christoph, a young boy who develops a friendship with composer Ludwig van Beethoven (Neil Munro), a boarder in the boy's parents' house. The film was shot in Prague in the Czech Republic and has been broadcast in over 110 countries in numerous languages and has sold over one million DVDs. The film is used extensively, thanks to its American Library Association's reviews and awards, in U.S. and Canadian elementary and middle school music classrooms.

The film went on to win the Primetime Emmy Award for Outstanding Children's Program in 1993, was nominated for 4 Gemini Awards, won the New England Film Festival, and was presented the Award of Excellence from the U.S. National Board of Film Review. Beethoven Lives Upstairs was also admitted to the Permanent Collection in the Paley Center for Media in New York City.

== Plot ==
In early 1820s Vienna, 10-year-old Christoph's father has died, and his uncle Kurt, a student at the Vienna Conservatory, arranges for Ludwig van Beethoven to rent the family's attic room. Christoph does not like having a stranger living in his house, is put off by Beethoven's eccentric behavior, and is teased by the neighborhood children over this. Kurt tells Christoph about the pain of Beethoven's deafness and implores him to give Beethoven a chance.

Beethoven gets to know the family and he bonds with Christoph. Soon, Christoph begins seeing things from Beethoven's side. After overhearing Beethoven talk about how miserable he is from being deaf, Christoph gives him an ear trumpet designed by his father. Beethoven later promises Christoph and his mother tickets to the premier performance.

At the concert, Beethoven is conducting, but cannot hear the orchestra, so Kurt discreetly conducts from the side. The orchestra finishes while Beethoven is still "conducting", so Kurt and one of the singers turn him around for him to see the audience's applause.

After Beethoven's death, Christoph reflects on his experiences, saying that Beethoven’s music will never die, and Beethoven thought that he could change the world with his music.

== Cast ==
- Neil Munro as Ludwig van Beethoven
- Illya Woloshyn as Christoph
- Fiona Reid as Mother
- Paul Soles as Anton Schindler
- Albert Schultz as Uncle Kurt
- Sheila McCarthy as Sophie

== Accolades ==
Year	Award	Category	Recipient(s) and nominee(s)	Result	Ref
1993	Primetime Emmy Awards	Primetime Emmy Award for Outstanding Children's Program	Beethoven Lives Upstairs	Won	
1993	Gemini Awards	Best Performance by an Actor in a Leading Role in a Dramatic Program or Mini-Series	Neil Munro	Nominated	
1993	Gemini Awards	Best Writing in a Dramatic Program or Mini-series	Heather Conkie	Nominated	
1993	Gemini Awards	Best Picture Editing in a Dramatic Program or Series	Rik Morden	Nominated	
1993	Gemini Awards	Best Overall Sound in a Dramatic Program or Series	Susan Hammond, Greg Chapman; Steve Gorman, David Appleby, Andy Malcolm	Nominated	
1994	CableACE Awards	International Children's Programming Special or Series	Beethoven Lives Upstairs	Nominated	
