= Bellingham Theatre Guild =

The Bellingham Theatre Guild is a community theater located in Bellingham, Washington. Founded in 1929, the guild has been housed in its current location - the old Congregational Church converted for live theater use - since 1944.

Academy Award-winner Hilary Swank spent some of her early years acting at the guild and in the surrounding community.
