= Range of Motion (film) =

2000 American television film

- Genre: Drama
- Based on: Range of Motion by Elizabeth Berg
- Written by: Grace McKeaney
- Directed by: Donald Wrye
- Starring: Rebecca De Mornay, Henry Czerny, Barclay Hope, Melanie Mayron, Charlotte Arnold, Kim Roberts, Dixie Seatle
- Country of origin: United States
- Original language: English

Production
- Running time: 96 minutes
- Production companies: Craig Anderson Productions; Hearst Entertainment Productions

Original release
- Network: Lifetime
- Release: December 4, 2000

Range of Motion is a 2000 American made-for-television drama film directed by Donald Wrye and based on a book by Elizabeth Berg, starring Rebecca De Mornay. De Mornay said, "The movie is about recognizing an inner strength, which you can call faith or love ... it's something every single person has inside of them".

== Plot summary ==
The film follows Lainey Berman after her husband, Jay, falls into a deep coma from a jogging accident. With two young daughters to care for, she relies on her faith and the help of her neighbor and close friend, Alice Tyson, as she tries to stay hopeful about Jay’s recovery.

== Cast and crew ==
- Rebecca De Mornay as Lainey Berman
- Henry Czerny as Ted Merrick
- Barclay Hope as Jay Berman
- Charlotte Arnold as Sarah Berman
- Stewart Bick as Burt Tyson
- Kim Roberts as Gloria
- Melanie Mayron as Alice Taylor
- Philip Akin as Flozell
- Lila Yee as Dr. Matthews
- Dixie Seatle as Pat Swenson
- Phillip Shepherd as Dr. Farrell

=== Crew ===
- Director – Donald Wrye
- Screenwriter – Grace McKeaney
- Production companies – Craig Anderson Productions; Hearst Entertainment Productions

== Reception ==
A review from the MSC Missionaries described Range of Motion as a simple, emotional telemovie about illness and family stress. The reviewer mentioned Rebecca De Mornay’s performance and the film’s focus on life‑support choices and the pressure on the family. Jay’s recovery was noted as a hopeful finish.

A feature in the Orlando Sentinel highlighted De Mornay’s work, describing it as another example of her handling demanding roles. The article quoted her saying the film is about finding inner strength, which she saw as a kind of faith or love.
