= Now and Then (film) =

1995 film by Lesli Linka Glatter

- Theatrical release poster
- Directed by: Lesli Linka Glatter
- Written by: I. Marlene King
- Produced by: Suzanne Todd; Demi Moore
- Starring: Christina Ricci; Thora Birch; Gaby Hoffmann; Ashleigh Aston Moore; Melanie Griffith; Demi Moore; Rosie O'Donnell; Rita Wilson
- Cinematography: Ueli Steiger
- Edited by: Jacqueline Cambas
- Music by: Cliff Eidelman
- Production company: Moving Pictures
- Distributed by: New Line Cinema
- Release date: October 20, 1995
- Running time: 100 minutes
- Country: United States
- Language: English
- Budget: $12 million
- Box office: $37.5 million

Now and Then is a 1995 American coming-of-age comedy-drama film directed by Lesli Linka Glatter and written by I. Marlene King. It stars Christina Ricci, Thora Birch, Gaby Hoffmann, Ashleigh Aston Moore, Melanie Griffith, Demi Moore, Rosie O'Donnell, and Rita Wilson. Its plot follows four women who recount a pivotal summer they shared together as adolescents in 1970.

Now and Then was filmed largely in the Country Walk subdivision off Coffee Bluff Road in Savannah, Georgia (called Shelby, Indiana, in the film, which itself is based on the real-world town of Winchester, Indiana), using the Gaslight Addition and Old Town Cemetery, highlighting the downtown area. Additional filming was done in Statesboro, Georgia, in locations including the Bulloch County Court House and the building now housing the Averitt Center for the Arts.

Although the film received unfavorable reviews upon release, it was a box office success, grossing $37.5 million against a $12 million budget. The film is considered a cult classic for its depiction of girlhood and centering of female friendships.

== Plot ==
In 1995, four women who were once childhood friends reunite in their hometown of Shelby, Indiana. They include science-fiction author Samantha Albertson, Hollywood actress Tina "Teeny" Tercell, gynecologist Dr. Roberta Martin, and homemaker Chrissy DeWitt, who is pregnant with her first child.

In a flashback to a memorable summer they shared in 1970, twelve-year-old Samantha seeks to raise money to purchase a tree house to place in Chrissy's backyard in their affluent suburban neighborhood, the Gaslight Addition. Each of the four girls is experiencing her own individual struggles: Samantha's parents are in the midst of a divorce, Teeny is in pursuit of stardom and is boy-crazy, tomboy Roberta is embarrassed by her developing breasts, and Chrissy is naive about sex and life in general due to her mother's overprotectiveness.

Motivated by Samantha's interest in the occult, the girls regularly sneak out at night to hold séances in the cemetery. During one, a cracked tombstone convinces them they have resurrected the spirit of a young boy identified only as Dear Johnny, who died in 1945. This sets the girls on a quest to discover what happened to him.

At a library in a nearby town, Roberta discovers an article about her mother's fatal car accident: she was hit head on, trapped in her car for an hour, and later died of massive head trauma and internal bleeding—details previously unknown to her. Samantha finds an obituary that briefly mentions Johnny and his mother tragically dying, but many of the pages are missing, leaving the cause of their deaths a mystery.

The girls also have a long-standing rivalry with the Wormer brothers, a group of neighborhood boys. Roberta later has her first kiss with Scott Wormer and swears him to secrecy.

Distraught after meeting her mother's new boyfriend over dinner, Samantha storms out of her home. She then meets with Teeny, confiding in her about her parents' divorce. Teeny comforts her and breaks her favorite necklace in two, giving one half to Samantha as a friendship bracelet. A thunderstorm breaks out as the girls head home, and Samantha accidentally drops her bracelet in a storm drain. She nearly drowns trying to retrieve it, but is rescued by Crazy Pete, a local old man who only comes out at night to ride his bicycle. This causes the girls to change their impression of Crazy Pete, who admits he only goes out at night because he prefers not to be around people.

When Samantha's grandmother refuses to tell the girls what happened to Johnny, they sneak into her attic. They discover old newspapers that reveal Jonathan Sims and his mother, Beverly Anne, were shot and killed when they interrupted a burglary; father and husband, Peter, came home to find their bodies. Roberta becomes upset and angry that two innocent people were killed and that her mother died violently, contrary to what she was told. Samantha tells them her parents are divorcing, and the girls make a pact to always be there for one another.

They go to the cemetery to perform one last séance to put Dear Johnny's soul to rest. His tombstone suddenly rises, surrounded by a bright light. However, a groundskeeper emerges from behind, chastising the girls for "playing" in the cemetery and explaining the damaged tombstone is being replaced because he was the one who cracked it. Chrissy refuses to participate in future séances, deeming them a waste of time. The entire ordeal prompts Samantha to realize her childhood is coming to an end.

While leaving, Samantha notices Crazy Pete visiting the tombstone. Realizing he is Peter, she comforts him, while he advises her not to dwell on things. Some time later, the tree house is finally bought, and Samantha narrates, "The tree house was supposed to bring us more independence. But what the summer actually brought was independence from each other."

In 1995, Chrissy goes into labor and gives birth to a baby girl delivered by Roberta. Later, in their old tree house, Roberta reveals that Crazy Pete died the previous year and Samantha confesses Pete was Dear Johnny's father. The friends reaffirm their pact and vow to remain close.

== Cast ==
=== Main ===
- Roberta Martin (Christina Ricci/Rosie O'Donnell) is the proclaimed tomboy of the girls, stemming primarily from her upbringing in a family consisting of her father and three older brothers, her mother having been killed in a car accident when she was four. She tapes her breasts to flatten them, plays sports, and never hesitates to fight a boy. She usually leads the girls in their rivalry with the Wormer brothers, but eventually shares a kiss with Scott. Afterward, she no longer tapes her breasts, indicating that she accepts that she is growing into a woman. Her struggle to come to terms with her mother's death is highlighted in the film when she fakes her own death before her friends by pretending to have drowned while they were swimming, as well as in another instance in which Samantha recalls her having jumped off the roof and pretended to have broken her neck earlier that summer. As an adult, she is an obstetrician and lives with her boyfriend. At the end of the film, she delivers Chrissy's baby. Although it is never shown or mentioned who her boyfriend is, the film hints that it might be Scott.
- Tina "Teeny" Tercell (Thora Birch/Melanie Griffith) lives with her rich country-club parents who are rarely around, which according to Samantha's narration, is "a typical upbringing for actors and pathological liars". She loves glamour, dressing up, and wearing makeup, and watches the films at the drive-in movie from her rooftop. Among the girls, she is the most interested in sexuality and boys and often flirts. She desires a bigger bust, and has breast implants when she is an adult. She is now a successful actress and has had multiple marriages. The limousine she arrives in is later used to transport Chrissy to the hospital when she goes into labor.
- Samantha Albertson (Gaby Hoffmann/Demi Moore) narrates the film. She believes in the paranormal and conducts the séances in the cemetery with her friends, who for the most part believe it to be all pretend. From the outside, her home life appears normal with her parents and younger sister, Angela. However, her parents had been having marital issues for some time now, much to the point that it had reached a level of consistency that never seemed to bother her. However, this came to an abrupt change when one night, her father moves out, and within a few weeks, she learns her mother is seeing another man named Bud Kent. As an adult, she is a popular science-fiction author who has commitment issues. At age 12, she was the most invested in the mystery of Dear Johnny, whose spirit the girls believe they have resurrected from his tombstone. She alone learns the truth behind his death, and receives valuable advice that later helps her come to terms with her current struggles in life.
- Chrissy DeWitt (Ashleigh Aston Moore/Rita Wilson) was raised by an overbearing, fastidious mother who sheltered her. Her naivete, particularly about all things sexual, is often laughed at by her friends. She is the "good girl", who chastises the others for cussing (as children and adults). Being the most responsible, she closely monitors the "tree house money" they are saving. She always questions the others' schemes, but is fiercely loyal to them. As an adult, she marries the nerdy Morton Williams, and they live in her childhood home and later have a baby girl. The pending birth of her first child brings Samantha and Teeny back to their hometown.

=== Supporting ===
- Devon Sawa as Scott Wormer, one of the Wormer brothers who bullies the girls, but later reforms and shares a kiss with Roberta
- Walter Sparrow as Crazy Pete, an old man who only comes out at night and scares the girls, but they later learn he is nice after he rescues Samantha. He is later revealed to be Peter Sims, the father of Jonathan and husband of Beverly Anne.
- Cloris Leachman as Grandma Albertson, mother of Mr. Albertson and grandmother of Samantha and Angela. She becomes very upset when her son leaves and worries dearly about her granddaughters. She is an avid poker and bingo player.
- Lolita Davidovich as Mrs. Albertson, mother of Samantha and Angela who recently got divorced and gets a new boyfriend, Bud Kent
- Janeane Garofalo as Wiladene, a diner waitress and spiritual reader and adviser whom the girls visit to tell them that they have been contacted by Dear Johnny's spirit, to which she tells them that he and his mother, Beverly Anne, were murdered
- Hank Azaria as Bud Kent, Mrs. Albertson's boyfriend whom she meets after her husband leaves. Angela takes a quick liking to him, but Samantha does not. He volunteers to take them to the Smithsonian Institution in Washington, D.C.
- Bonnie Hunt as Mrs. DeWitt, mother of Chrissy who shelters her and uses plants and gardening to explain sex to her and also informs her that all hippies are sex fiends
- Rumer Willis (credited as Willa Glen) as Angela Albertson, sister of Samantha who misses her father dearly but takes a quick liking to her mother's new boyfriend, Bud Kent
- Bradley Coryell as Clay Wormer, one of the Wormer brothers who bullies the girls
- Justin Humphrey as Eric Wormer, one of the Wormer brothers who bullies the girls
- Travis Robertson as Roger Wormer, one of the Wormer brothers who bullies the girls
- Brendan Fraser as the Vietnam veteran (uncredited), a soldier who fought in the Vietnam War whom the girls meet while riding their bicycles and on whom Samantha seemingly develops a crush. He informs them that although their parents are adults, they are not always right.

== Production ==
Jamie Lee Curtis was originally announced to play the adult Chrissy, but she was replaced by Rita Wilson. The film's working title was The Gaslight Addition.

== Soundtrack ==
Columbia Records released a soundtrack album on October 10, 1995. It was made up of tunes from the 1960s and 1970s.

The following songs appear in the film, but not on the soundtrack:

- "Midnight Rider" by The Allman Brothers Band
- "These Boots Are Made For Walkin'" by Nancy Sinatra
- "As I Lay Me Down" by Sophie B. Hawkins
- "These Eyes" by The Guess Who

One of the songs is anachronistic for a story set in the summer of 1970: "Knock Three Times" was released in 1971.

1. "Sugar, Sugar" – The Archies (2:45)
2. "Knock Three Times" – Tony Orlando and Dawn (2:54)
3. "I Want You Back" – The Jackson 5 (2:53)
4. "Signed, Sealed, Delivered I'm Yours" – Stevie Wonder (2:39)
5. "Band of Gold" – Freda Payne (2:53)
6. "Daydream Believer" – The Monkees (2:49)
7. "No Matter What" – Badfinger (2:59)
8. "Hitchin' a Ride" – Vanity Fare (2:55)
9. "All Right Now" – Free (5:29)
10. "I'm Gonna Make You Love Me" – Supremes/Temptations (3:06)
11. "I'll Be There" – The Jackson 5 (3:56)
12. "Now and Then" – Susanna Hoffs (5:34)

Varèse Sarabande issued an album of Cliff Eidelman's score on October 24, 1995.

1. "Main Title" (3:05)
2. "Remembrance" (1:57)
3. "A Secret Meeting" (2:11)
4. "On the Swing" (1:26)
5. "It's My Mom" (2:32)
6. "Spirits Are Here" (2:17)
7. "Sam's Dad Leaves" (1:56)
8. "It's a Girl" (1:48)
9. "Roberta Fakes Death" (1:26)
10. "Best Friends for Life" (3:07)
11. "Pete Saves Sam" (2:29)
12. "The Pact" (3:10)
13. "No More Seances" (1:44)
14. "Rest in Peace Johnny" (4:22)

=== Certifications ===
Region	Certification	Certified units/sales
United States (RIAA)	Gold	500,000^{^}
^{^} Shipments figures based on certification alone.

== Reception ==
=== Box office ===
Now and Then was released in North American theaters on October 20, 1995, ultimately grossing $37.5 million worldwide. In its opening weekend, it debuted in the number two spot and earned $7.4 million, behind Get Shorty and above the thriller Seven.

=== Critical response ===
On Rotten Tomatoes, Now and Then holds an approval rating of 36% based on 22 reviews, with an average rating of 5.2/10. Metacritic, which uses a weighted average, assigned the film a score of 50, based on 23 critics, indicating "mixed or average" reviews. Audiences polled by CinemaScore gave the film an average grade of "B+" on an A+ to F scale.

Roger Ebert of the Chicago Sun-Times criticized the story, saying it was "made of artificial bits and pieces" whereas "What distinguished Stand by Me was the psychological soundness of the story: We could believe it and care about it." Ebert instead praised another film about girlhood The Man in the Moon for its truthful storytelling and said that in comparison this film was "a gimmicky sitcom". Alison Macor of The Austin Chronicle wrote the film is "sweet and it's often funny, but ultimately its slice-of-life approach tries too hard to incorporate current events like the Vietnam War."

Though critics were lukewarm towards the story, multiple reviews praised the four young leads' acting. Macor acknowledged "the four young actresses effectively convey that on-the-verge feeling between puberty and teen-hood". In a positive review, Edward Guthmann of the San Francisco Chronicle wrote Now and Then "nicely captures the giddiness, excitement and resistance to adult responsibility that are specific to 12-year-old girls. It's not particularly deep, but it's a good-natured, sprightly comedy that ought to find its most appreciative audience among preteen girls."

== Legacy ==
In the years since Now and Then's release, the film has gained a large cult following through home video, repeat airings on cable TV, and as a staple at girls' sleepovers.

In a New York Times piece discussing the film's cultural impact, Ilana Kaplan wrote Now and Then was ahead of its time for "giving the complexities of girlhood a weight that coming-of-age films [had heretofore] typically neglected…[The film] showed tween girls as fully realized characters who weren't written off or secondary. Tackling death and grief, along with budding sexuality gave their stories weight when narratives about female adolescence were often surface-level."

Screenwriter I. Marlene King went on to create the teen drama television series Pretty Little Liars, which she said is influenced by Now and Then. King would reunite with director Lesli Linka Glatter for Liars, with the latter directing the pilot episode and two season finales. Though King announced in 2012 she would be developing Now and Then as a series for ABC Family, the project did not come to materialize. According to King, ABC Family wanted to change the concept "so the 'now' was present day and the 'then' would be the '90s. I didn't want to do that – I felt that kind of ruins how special the movie is...I didn't want to take a chance on changing the time period. To me, there will never be a 1970s again, so to try to set it in the '90s when we had cell phones and things like that, I don't think it would work."

== Now and Then (novelization) ==
A novelization of the film was written by Harriet Grey and published by Parachute Press, the same year as the movie's release. The book adapts the story of Samantha, Teeny, Roberta and Chrissy, reflecting on their childhood during the summer of 1970. The novel offers a deeper exploration of the characters' lives, their emotional complexities, and adds scenes not included in the film.

=== Key differences from the film ===
- In the novel, Samantha's emotional struggles surrounding her parents' divorce are explored in more detail such as her resentment toward her mother for quickly dating again after the separation.
- The novelization adds more context regarding the Vietnam War and its impact on the girls' lives. The scene in the film where Brenden Fraser portrays a Vietnam War veteran is expanded in the book compared to the brief mention in the film.
- The girls share more intimate conversations about their futures, their friendships, and their fears in the treehouse than in the film.
- The novel features a playful kiss between Teeny and Scott Wormer, a scene which was not in the film.
- The book includes more insight into Chrissy's life and struggles, particularly her desire to fit in and her challenges with body image.
- The novel offers additional scenes that explore the history of the fictional Shelby, Indiana, such as the girls' visits to the local cemetery. This section is more detailed in the book, providing a glimpse into the town's past and the impact of local events, including the fallout from the Vietnam War, which shaped the community's identity.
- The adult women's reflections on their childhood and their current lives are more fleshed out in the novelization. The book explores their thoughts on their friendships, how their relationships have changed over time, and how the summer they spent together shaped their lives.
