= Elizabeth Berg (author) =

American novelist (born 1948)

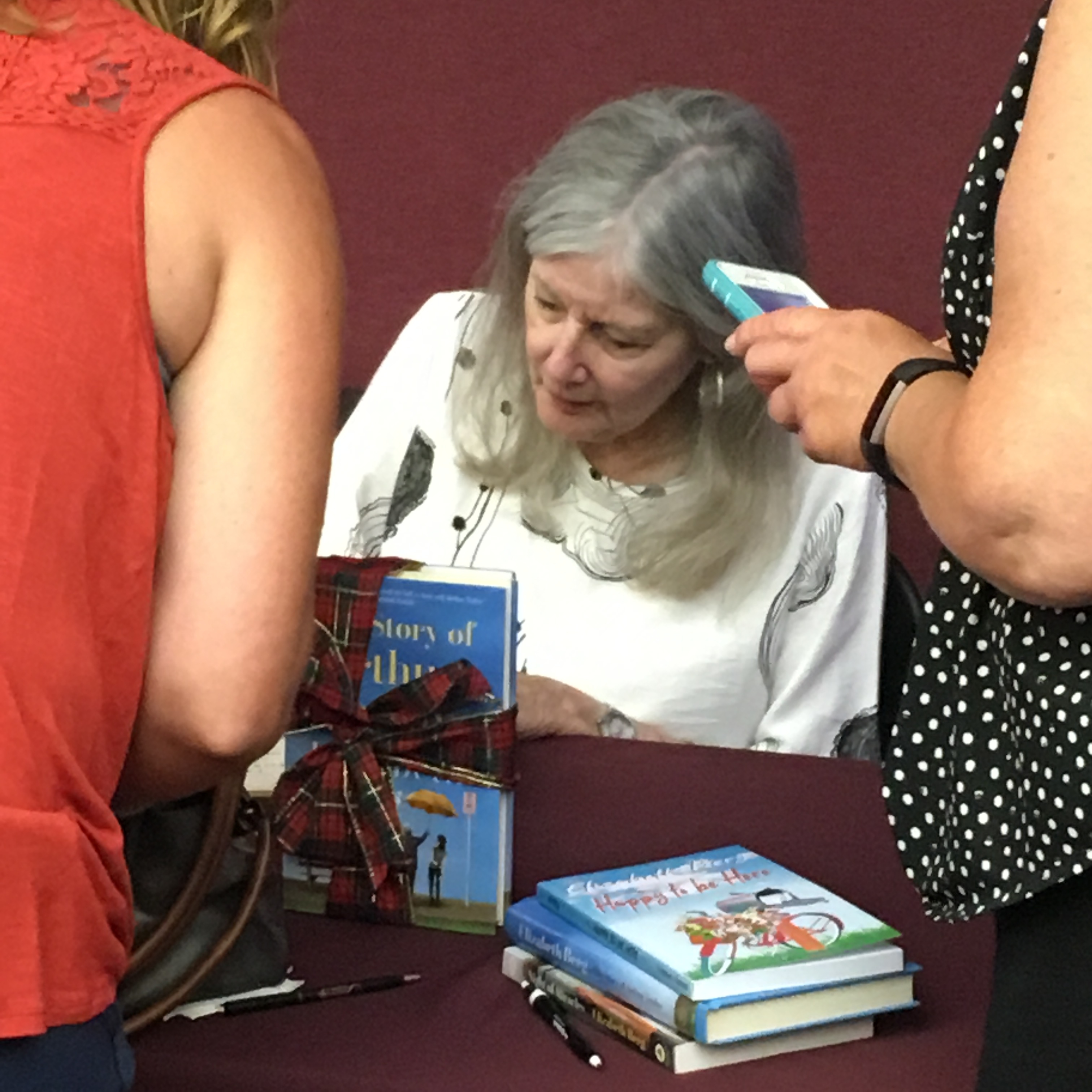
- Berg at a book signing
- Born: December 2, 1948 (age 77); Saint Paul, Minnesota, U.S.
- Education: University of Minnesota
- Occupations: Novelist, essayist, memoirist
- Writing career
- Period: 1993–present
- Notable works: The Story of Arthur Truluv, Open House, The Dream Lover
- Website: www.elizabeth-berg.net

Elizabeth Berg (born December 2, 1948) is an American novelist and former registered nurse. She writes character‑focused stories about family life and personal change, and her work has been recognized by the American Library Association.

== Early life and education ==
She was born in Saint Paul, Minnesota, and lived in Boston prior to her residence in Chicago. She studied English and Humanities at the University of Minnesota, but later ended up with a nursing degree.

== Career ==
Her writing career started when she won an essay contest in Parents magazine. Since her debut novel in 1993, her novels have sold in large numbers and have received several awards and nominations, although some critics have tagged them as sentimental. Her novel Talk Before Sleep was shortlisted for the ABBY Award in 1996. She won the New England Book Awards in 1997. Her later novels, including True to Form, Never Change, and Open House, became national bestsellers, with Open House being selected for Oprah’s Book Club in 2000. Durable Goods and Joy School were named American Library Association Best Books of the Year, and she also published the nonfiction work Escaping into the Open: The Art of Writing True. In 2008, Berg gave public readings from her collection The Day I Ate Whatever I Wanted: And Other Small Acts of Liberation.

In 2009, Berg began writing Home Safe after a period when she felt worn out, later saying that working on the novel helped her return to her writing routine. In 2010, Berg served as the keynote speaker at Catawba College’s Brady Author’s Symposium, where she discussed her work and the themes that shape her fiction. In 2011, Berg published Once Upon a Time, There Was You, saying that one of its characters was inspired by a longtime friend from Saint Paul, Minnesota. That same year, she took part in the Chicago Tribune’s Author Talks series with Jacquelyn Mitchard, reflecting her ongoing involvement in the Chicago-area literary scene. In 2012, Berg appeared at a public literary event hosted by the Algonquin Area Public Library in Illinois, where she read from her new work and introduced fellow author Betsy Woodman. In 2013, Berg published the novel Tapestry of Fortunes, a story set in her birthplace of Saint Paul, Minnesota. The opening chapter was featured by the Star Tribune.

In 2014, Berg contributed an original essay to the Chicago Public Library’s One Book, One Chicago program as part of its Chicago Heroes series. Later that year, she drew media attention when she shared her mother’s Christmas essay on social media, an act that was reported by the St. Paul Pioneer Press. In 2015, Berg launched the literary series Writing Matters at the Ernest Hemingway Museum in Oak Park, creating a venue to support midlist authors and host public reading events. The program was profiled by the Chicago Tribune. Also in 2015, Berg published the historical novel The Dream Lover, a fictionalized account of the life of George Sand. The book was reviewed by The New York Times. In 2016, Berg gave a reading from her collection Make Someone Happy: Favorite Postings at the St. Joseph County Public Library in South Bend. The event was covered by the South Bend Tribune.

In 2017, Berg published the novel The Story of Arthur Truluv, which received a positive review from USA Today. Later in 2017, Berg appeared as part of the Fogle Author Series at the Rodman Public Library, where she discussed her work and met with readers. The event was reported by The Alliance Review. As part of her ongoing work, Berg released Night of Miracles in 2018, the second novel set in Mason, Missouri. USA Today described the book positively in its review. The novel also drew favorable coverage from the Boston Herald, which described it as a warm and comforting read. In 2019, Berg published The Confession Club. The novel was featured by the Chicago Sun-Times as one of the notable new book releases of the season, with the article highlighting a positive remark from Publishers Weekly. Later in 2019, Berg discussed The Confession Club at an author event hosted by The BookMark in Neptune Beach, an appearance reported by the Florida Times-Union.

In 2020, Berg published I’ll Be Seeing You: A Memoir, about caring for her aging parents. The book was reviewed by The New York Times. It was later featured in Arab News upon release. In 2023, Berg discussed her novel Earth’s the Right Place for Love at an event hosted by the Evergreen Park Public Library in Illinois, where she spoke about returning to the characters from The Story of Arthur Truluv (2017). In 2026, Berg published Life: A Love Story, a novel released by Random House.

== Works ==
The novels Durable Goods, Joy School, and True to Form form a trilogy about the 12-year-old Katie Nash, in part based on the author's own experience as a daughter in a military family. Her essay "The Pretend Knitter" appears in the anthology Knitting Yarns: Writers on Knitting, published by W. W. Norton & Company in November 2013.

In 2000, a made-for-television drama film titled Range of Motion, based on her 1995 novel, was released starring Rebecca De Mornay.

== Bibliography ==
- Family traditions: celebrations for holidays and everyday (1992), illustrations by Robert Roth
- Durable Goods (1993), selected among the ALA's Best Books of the Year
- Talk Before Sleep (1994)
- Range of Motion (1995)
- The Pull of the Moon (1996)
- Joy School (1997), selected among the ALA 1998 Best Books for Young Adults
- What We Keep (1998)
- Escaping into the Open: The Art of Writing True (1999), non-fiction
- Until the Real Thing Comes Along (1999)
- Open House (2000), Oprah's Book Club selection
- Never Change (2001)
- Ordinary Life: stories (2002)
- True to Form (2002)
- Say When (2003)
- The Art of Mending (2004)
- The Year of Pleasures (2005)
- The Handmaid and the Carpenter (2006)
- We Are All Welcome Here (2006)
- Dream When You're Feeling Blue (2007)
- The Day I Ate Whatever I Wanted (2008)
- Home Safe (2009)
- The Last Time I Saw You (2010)
- Once Upon a Time, There Was You (2011)
- Tapestry of Fortunes (2013)
- The Dream Lover (2015)
- Make Someone Happy: Favorite Postings (2016)
- The Story of Arthur Truluv (2017)
- Night of Miracles (2018)
- The Confession Club (2019)
- I'll Be Seeing You: a Memoir (2020)
- Earth's the Right Place for Love (2023)
- Life: A Love Story (2026)
