= Dora Mavor Moore Award for Best Direction (General Theatre) =

Theatre award

The Dora Mavor Moore Award for Outstanding Direction of a Play/Musical is an annual award celebrating achievements in Toronto theatre.

== Winners and nominees ==
=== 1980s ===
| Year | Director | Play | Ref |
|---|---|---|---|
| 1980 | Guy Sprung | Balconville and Paper Wheat | |
| 1980 | Peter Froehlich | Staller's Farm | |
| 1980 | Ken Livingstone | American Buffalo | |
| 1980 | George Luscombe | Ain't Lookin' | |
| 1981 | George F. Walker | Theatre of the Film Noir | |
| 1981 | William Lane | Loose Ends | |
| 1981 | Alan Scarfe | The Last Meeting of the Knights of the White Magnolia | |
| 1981 | Ray Whelan | Arms and the Man | |
| 1982 | Richard Rose | Tamara | |
| 1982 | Jim Garrard | Cold Comfort | |
| 1982 | Guy Sprung | Night and Day | |
| 1982 | Henry Tarvainen | Straight Ahead/Blind Dancers | |
| 1983 | Guy Sprung | Translations | |
| 1983 | Leon Major | Sister Mary Ignatius Explains It All for You and Identity Crisis | |
| 1983 | Robin Phillips | The Prisoner of Zenda | |
| 1983 | Guy Sprung | Dream in High Park | |
| 1984 | Bill Glassco | Cloud Nine | |
| 1984 | Derek Goldby, David Hemblen | Delicatessen | |
| 1984 | Ray Jewers | Trafford Tanzi | |
| 1984 | Leon Major | The Dining Room | |
| 1985 | Derek Goldby | Uncle Vanya | |
| 1985 | Bill Glassco | Salt-Water Moon | |
| 1985 | Ken Livingstone | 'night, Mother | |
| 1985 | Robin Phillips | New World | |
| 1985 | Aaron Schwartz | Come Back to the Five and Dime, Jimmy Dean, Jimmy Dean | |
| 1986 | Richard Greenblatt | The Miracle Worker | |
| 1986 | Alexander Hausvater | Ghetto | |
| 1986 | Ken Livingstone | Other Places | |
| 1986 | Andy McKim | The Wedding Script | |
| 1986 | John Van Burek | Hosanna | |
| 1987 | Bob Baker | B-Movie: The Play | |
| 1987 | Dennis Foon | Bedtimes and Bullies | |
| 1987 | Jeff Henry | The Bloodknot | |
| 1987 | Urjo Kareda, Andy McKim | Aunt Dan and Lemon | |
| 1987 | John Van Burek | Bonjour, La, Bonjour | |
| 1988 | Larry Lillo | A Lie of the Mind | |
| 1988 | Bill Glassco | Nothing Sacred | |
| 1988 | Derek Goldby | I Am Yours | |
| 1988 | Richard Greenblatt | Detaining Mr. Trotsky | |
| 1988 | Robert Rooney | Something in the Air | |
| 1989 | Robert Lepage | The Dragons Trilogy | |
| 1989 | Denise Filiatrault | Les Fridolinades | |
| 1989 | Larry Lewis | Dry Lips Oughta Move to Kapuskasing | |
| 1989 | Richard Rose | The Possibilities | |
| 1989 | Susan Wright | Under the Skin | |

=== 1990s ===
| Year | Director | Play | Ref |
|---|---|---|---|
| 1990 | JoAnn McIntyre | The Collected Works of Billy the Kid | |
| 1990 | Bob Baker | Breaking the Code | |
| 1990 | Derek Goldby | The Father | |
| 1990 | Robert Lepage | Echo | |
| 1990 | Richard Rose | The Europeans | |
| 1991 | Richard Monette | Saint Joan | |
| 1991 | Richard Greenblatt | Mirror Game | |
| 1991 | Peter Hinton-Davis | Possible Worlds | |
| 1991 | Brian Richmond | Lilies | |
| 1991 | John Van Burek | La Maison Suspendue | |
| 1992 | Neil Munro | Hamlet | |
| 1992 | François Faucher | Elvire Jouvet 40 | |
| 1992 | Dennis Foon | Naomi's Road | |
| 1992 | László Marton | Three Sisters | |
| 1992 | Paulette Phillips | Under the Influence | |
| 1993 | Harold Prince | Kiss of the Spider Woman | |
| 1993 | Maja Ardal | Whale | |
| 1993 | Marti Maraden | Fallen Angels | |
| 1993 | Duncan McIntosh | Le Bal | |
| 1993 | Steven Pimlott | Joseph and the Amazing Technicolor Dreamcoat | |
| 1994 | Mike Ockrent | Crazy for You | |
| 1994 | Maja Ardal | A Christmas Carol | |
| 1994 | John Bourgeois | The Taming of the Shrew | |
| 1994 | Peter Hinton-Davis | Abundance | |
| 1994 | Nicholas Hytner | Miss Saigon | |
| 1995 | Des McAnuff | Tommy | |
| 1995 | Bob Baker | Into the Woods | |
| 1995 | Marti Maraden | Six Degrees of Separation | |
| 1996 | Robert Lepage | The Seven Streams of the River Ota | |
| 1996 | Maja Ardal | Two Weeks with the Queen | |
| 1996 | Leah Cherniak | The Diary of Anne Frank | |
| 1996 | Robert Lepage | Elsinore | |
| 1996 | Gilles Maheu | The Dead Souls | |
| 1997 | Frank Galati | Ragtime | |
| 1997 | Rob Bettinson | Jolson | |
| 1997 | John Caird | Jane Eyre | |
| 1997 | Marshall Pynkoski | Don Giovanni | |
| 1997 | James Robinson | Elektra | |
| 1998 | Ian Prinsloo | Patience | |
| 1998 | Daniel Brooks | The Designated Mourner | |
| 1998 | Leah Cherniak | The Betrayal | |
| 1998 | Alisa Palmer | The Quartet | |
| 1998 | Miles Potter | Molly Sweeney | |
| 1998 | Richard Rose | Inexpressible Island | |
| 1998 | George F. Walker | Problem Child | |
| 1999 | Soheil Parsa. Aurash Miles Potter | The Drawer Boy | |
| 1999 | John MacLachlan Gray, Eric Peterson | Billy Bishop Goes to War | |
| 1999 | Michael Hollingsworth | The Life and Times of Brian Mulroney | |
| 1999 | Andy McKim | Kilt | |
| 1999 | Miles Potter | The Drawer Boy | |
| 1999 | Guillermo Verdecchia, Daniel Brooks | Insomnia | |

=== 2000s ===
| Year | Director | Play | Ref |
|---|---|---|---|
| 2000 | László Marton | Platonov | |
| 2000 | Daniel Brooks | Endgame | |
| 2000 | Daniel Brooks | Faust | |
| 2000 | Morris Panych, Wendy Gorling | The Overcoat | |
| 2000 | Sarah Stanley | Beaver | |
| 2001 | Ian McElhinney | Stones in His Pockets | |
| 2001 | Blake Brooker, Denise Clarke | Thunderstruck | |
| 2001 | Daniel Brooks | Betrayal | |
| 2001 | Dennis Garnhum | Slavs! | |
| 2001 | Pierre Tétrault | Ghost Train | |
| 2002 | Jim Warren | The Bald Soprano | |
| 2002 | Daniel Brooks | The Good Life | |
| 2002 | Rosemary Dunsmore | Fighting Words | |
| 2002 | Dennis Garnhum | Skylight | |
| 2002 | Daniel MacIvor | In On It | |
| 2002 | Kelly Thornton | This Hotel | |
| 2003 | Morris Panych | Girl in the Goldfish Bowl | |
| 2003 | Chris Abraham | Russell Hill | |
| 2003 | Leah Cherniak | The Miracle Worker | |
| 2003 | Brian Quirt | Through the Eyes | |
| 2003 | Albert Schultz | A Chorus of Disapproval | |
| 2004 | Richard Rose | Remnants | |
| 2004 | Guy Mignault | Le Visiteur | |
| 2004 | Larry Moss | The Syringa Tree | |
| 2004 | Richard Rose | Simpl | |
| 2004 | Sarah Stanley | Restitution: An Irish-Canadian Rhapsody | |
| 2005 | Ken Gass | The Leisure Society | |
| 2005 | Daniel Brooks | Bigger Than Jesus | |
| 2005 | Daniel Brooks | Half-Life | |
| 2005 | Allen MacInnis | Blue Planet | |
| 2005 | Joseph Ziegler | Hamlet | |
| 2006 | Nigel Shawn Williams | The Monument | |
| 2006 | Daniel MacIvor | A Beautiful View | |
| 2006 | Weyni Mengesha | blood.claat - one womban story | |
| 2006 | Richard Rose | Leo | |
| 2006 | Joseph Ziegler | Our Town | |
| 2007 | Richard Rose | Scorched | |
| 2007 | Chris Abraham | Insomnia | |
| 2007 | Daniel Brooks | Here Lies Henry | |
| 2007 | Ted Dykstra | Leaving Home | |
| 2007 | Jennifer Tarver | Crave | |
| 2008 | Alisa Palmer | Top Girls | |
| 2008 | Philip Akin | Intimate Apparel | |
| 2008 | Micheline Chevrier | The December Man | |
| 2008 | Diana Leblanc | Rose | |
| 2008 | Jean-Stéphane Roy | The Misanthrope | |
| 2009 | Ed Roy | Agokwe | |
| 2009 | Chris Abraham | I, Claudia | |
| 2009 | Jason Byrne | Festen | |
| 2009 | Denise Clarke | Radio Play | |
| 2009 | Weyni Mengesha | A Raisin in the Sun | |

=== 2010s ===
| Year | Playwright | Title | Ref |
|---|---|---|---|
| 2010 | Morris Panych | Parfumerie | |
| 2010 | Adam Brazier | Assassins | |
| 2010 | Alan Dilworth | If We Were Birds | |
| 2010 | Graham McLaren | Hamlet | |
| 2010 | Richard Rose | Courageous | |
| 2011 | Brendan Healy | Blasted | |
| 2011 | Philip Akin | Ruined | |
| 2011 | Allen MacInnis | A Year With Frog and Toad | |
| 2011 | Gina Wilkinson | Wide Awake Hearts | |
| 2011 | Nigel Shawn Williams | Brothel #9 | |
| 2012 | Philip Akin | Topdog/Underdog | |
| 2012 | Alan Dilworth | Crash | |
| 2012 | Ross Manson | The Golden Dragon | |
| 2012 | Robert McQueen | Caroline, or Change | |
| 2012 | Kelly Thornton | The Penelopiad | |
| 2013 | Chris Abraham | The Little Years | |
| 2013 | Chris Abraham | Someone Else | |
| 2013 | Brendan Healy | Arigato, Tokyo | |
| 2013 | Evalyn Parry | Obaaberima | |
| 2013 | Albert Schultz | The Crucible | |
| 2014 | Albert Schultz | Of Human Bondage | |
| 2014 | Brendan Healy | Pig | |
| 2014 | Weyni Mengesha | Lungs | |
| 2014 | Adam Paolozza | The Double | |
| 2014 | Richard Rose | A God in Need of Help | |
| 2015 | Eda Holmes | Tom at the Farm | |
| 2015 | Alan Dilworth | Twelve Angry Men | |
| 2015 | Gísli Örn Garðarsson | The Heart of Robin Hood | |
| 2015 | Ravi Jain | Accidental Death of an Anarchist | |
| 2015 | Richard Rose | An Enemy of the People | |
| 2016 | Ravi Jain | Salt-Water Moon | |
| 2016 | Ashlie Corcoran | Mustard | |
| 2016 | Matjash Mrozewski, Estelle Shook | Botticelli in the Fire and Sunday in Sodom | |
| 2016 | Peter Hinton-Davis | Bombay Black | |
| 2016 | Ravi Jain | We Are Proud to Present... | |
| 2017 | Philip Akin | "Master Harold" ...and the Boys | |
| 2017 | Nina Lee Aquino | acquiesce | |
| 2017 | Ashlie Corcoran | KISS | |
| 2017 | Alan Dilworth | Incident at Vichy | |
| 2017 | Weyni Mengesha | Father Comes Home From the Wars (Parts I, II, III) | |
| 2018 | Mitchell Cushman | Jerusalem | |
| 2018 | Alan Dilworth | Idomeneus | |
| 2018 | Richard Rose | Hamlet | |
| 2018 | Djanet Sears | For Colored Girls Who Have Considered Suicide / When the Rainbow Is Enuf | |
| 2018 | Ted Witzel | LULU v.7 // aspects of a femme fatale | |
| 2019 | Nina Lee Aquino | School Girls; Or, The African Mean Girls Play | |
| 2019 | Brendan Healy | Every Brilliant Thing | |
| 2019 | Mumbi Tindyebwa Otu | Oraltorio: A Theatrical Mixtape | |
| 2019 | Meg Roe | Middletown | |
| 2019 | Guillermo Verdecchia | The Royale | |

=== 2020s ===
| Year | Playwright | Title | Ref |
|---|---|---|---|
| 2020 | Mumbi Tindyebwa Otu | The Brothers Size | |
| 2020 | Chris Abraham | Julius Caesar | |
| 2020 | Mitchell Cushman | The Flick | |
| 2020 | Jani Lauzon | Almighty Voice and His Wife | |
| 2020 | Weyni Mengesha | A Streetcar Named Desire | |
| 2021 | No ceremony held due to the effect of the COVID-19 pandemic in Canada on theatre production in 2020. | | |
| 2022 | Soheil Parsa | Wildfire | |
| 2022 | Courtney Ch’ng Lancaster | Three Women of Swatow | |
| 2022 | Weyni Mengesha | Pipeline | |
| 2022 | Mumbi Tindyebwa Otu | Is God Is | |
| 2022 | John Tiffany | Harry Potter and the Cursed Child | |
| 2023 | Cherissa Richards | Red Velvet | |
| 2023 | Philip Akin | Maanomaa, My Brother | |
| 2023 | Marie Farsi | Fifteen Dogs | |
| 2023 | Weyni Mengesha | Queen Goneril | |
| 2023 | Alisa Palmer | Fall On Your Knees, Part Two: The Diary | |
| 2024 | Andrew Kushnir | Bad Roads | |
| 2024 | Chris Abraham | The Master Plan | |
| 2024 | Seth Bockley | King Gilgamesh and the Man of the Wild | |
| 2024 | Brendan Healy | The Inheritance, Pt. 1 | |
| 2024 | Mumbi Tindyebwa Otu | Sizwe Banzi Is Dead | |
| 2025 | Ravi Jain | Mahabharata: Part One: Karma: The Life We Inherit | |
| 2025 | Brendan Healy | Who's Afraid of Virginia Woolf? | |
| 2025 | Djanet Sears | Table for Two | |
| 2025 | Mumbi Tindeybwa Otu | Flex | |
| 2026 | Gregory Prest | Bremen Town | |
| 2026 | Andrea Donaldson | Enormity, Girl, and the Earthquake in Her Lungs | |
| 2026 | Claren Grosz, Augusto Bitter | Reina | |
| 2026 | Thomas Morgan Jones | Through the Eyes of God | |
| 2026 | Karine Ricard | The Misunderstanding (Le malentendu) | |
