= 1984 Dora Mavor Moore Awards =

1984 Canadian performing arts ceremony

The 1984 Dora Mavor Moore Awards celebrated excellence in theatre from the Toronto Alliance for the Performing Arts.

== Winners and nominees ==
=== General Theatre Division ===
Production	Original Play
Cloud Nine – Schwarz/Sewell Productions; Delicatessen – Toronto Free Theatre; In the Jungle of Cities – Toronto Free Theatre; The Dining Room – Gemstone Productions; Trafford Tanzi – Toronto Free Theatre and National Arts Centre	Mein by Stewart Arnott, Mark Christmann, Dorian Clark, Denis Forest, Maggie Huculak, Tanja Jacobs, Susan McKenzie, Richard Rose and Ines Ruchli – Autumn Angel Repertory; I am Not a Legend by Gordon Carruth and Bob Knuckle; Mystery of the Oak Island Treasure by Jim Betts and John Roby – Young People's Theatre; Names by Larry Cox and George Luscombe – Toronto Workshop Productions; Tower by Lawrence Jeffery – Factory Theatre
Leading Actor	Leading Actress
Douglas Rain for The Dining Room – Gemstone Productions; Douglas Campbell for The Homecoming; Gordon Clapp for Trafford Tanzi – Toronto Free Theatre and National Arts Centre; Richard Hilger for Three Beats to the Bar – Theatre Passe Muraille; Dan Lett for Delicatessen – Toronto Free Theatre; R. H. Thomson for The Jail Diary of Albie Sachs – Toronto Workshop Productions	Martha Burns for Trafford Tanzi – Toronto Free Theatre and National Arts Centre; Jackie Burroughs for White Biting Dog – Tarragon Theatre; Rosemary Dunsmore for Single – Saidye Bronfman Centre for the Arts; Barbara Gordon for The Dining Room – Gemstone Productions; Kate Trotter for Top Girls – Tarragon Theatre
Supporting Actor	Supporting Actress
Richard Donat for In the Jungle of Cities – Toronto Free Theatre; Maurice Evans for The Jail Diary of Albie Sachs – Toronto Workshop Productions; Stephen Ouimette for White Biting Dog – Tarragon Theatre; Errol Slue for Of Mice and Men – Young People's Theatre; Steve Weston for Cat on a Hot Tin Roof	Clare Coulter for Top Girls – Tarragon Theatre; Joyce Campion for Delicatessen – Toronto Free Theatre; Robin Craig for Top Girls – Tarragon Theatre; Iréna Mayeska for Summerfolk – CentreStage; Bridget O'Sullivan for Trafford Tanzi – Toronto Free Theatre and National Arts Centre
Direction	Scenic Design
Bill Glassco for Cloud Nine – Schwarz/Sewell Productions; Derek Goldby and David Hemblen for Delicatessen – Toronto Free Theatre; Ray Jewers for Trafford Tanzi – Toronto Free Theatre and National Arts Centre; Leon Major for The Dining Room – Gemstone Productions; Guy Sprung for In the Jungle of Cities – Toronto Free Theatre	Mary Kerr for In the Jungle of Cities – Toronto Free Theatre; Terry Gunvordahl for Delicatessen – Toronto Free Theatre; Barbra Matis for Three Beats to the Bar – Theatre Passe Muraille; Roy Robitshek for Trafford Tanzi – Toronto Free Theatre and National Arts Centre; Phillip Silver for The Dining Room – Gemstone Productions; Alan Stichbury for Cat on a Hot Tin Roof
Costume Design	Lighting Design
Mary Kerr for In the Jungle of Cities – Toronto Free Theatre; Mark Negin for Summerfolk – CentreStage; Christina Poddubiuk for Toad of Toad Hall – CentreStage; Cameron Porteous for Cloud Nine – Schwarz/Sewell Productions; Roy Robitshek for Trafford Tanzi – Toronto Free Theatre and National Arts Centre	Peter Smith for In the Jungle of Cities – Toronto Free Theatre; Donald Finlayson for Delicatessen – Toronto Free Theatre; Harry Frehner for A Christmas Carol – Young People's Theatre; Harry Frehner and Louise Guinand for Mystery of the Oak Island Treasure – Young People's Theatre; Alan Stichbury for Cat on a Hot Tin Roof

=== Musical Theatre or Revue Division ===
Production	Original Musical
Pump Boys and Dinettes – Variety Dinner Theatre; Madeira M’Dear – Sho/On Productions; Nightbloom – COMUS Music Theatre	Jacob Two-Two Meets the Hooded Fang by Philip Balsam, Jim Betts, Dennis Lee and Mordecai Richler – Young People's Theatre; No Man Is a Centre Island by John Hemphill, Ron James, Don Lake, Kathleen Laskev, Debra McGrath and Bruce Pirrie – Second City; Waiting for John Doe by Sandra Balcovske, John Hemphill, Ron James, Don Lake, Debra McGrath, Kathleen Laskev and Bruce Pirrie – Second City
Actor	Actress
Brian George for Madeira M’Dear – Sho/On Productions; John Hemphill for Waiting for John Doe – Second City; Blaine Parker for Forbidden Broadway	Darcy Dunlop for Noel and Gertie – Royal Alexander Theatre; Salome Bey for Shimmytime – Toronto Free Theatre; Mary Ellen Mahoney for Funny Girl – Warrack Productions
Direction	Scenic Design
Bartley Bard for Madeira M’Dear – Sho/On Productions; Joel Greenberg for Forbidden Broadway; Diane Nyland for Funny Girl – Warrack Productions	Judith Lee for Pump Boys and Dinettes – Variety Dinner Theatre; Douglas McLean for Guys and Dolls – CentreStage; John Pennoyer for Alice – Young People's Theatre
Costume Design	Lighting Design
Astrid Janson for Jacob Two-Two Meets the Hooded Fang – Young People's Theatre; Reginald Bronskill for Nightbloom – COMUS Music Theatre; John Pennoyer for Alice – Young People's Theatre	Robert Thomson for Pump Boys and Dinettes – Variety Dinner Theatre; Harry Frehner for Nightbloom – COMUS Music Theatre; Robert Thomson for Fascinatin’ Rhythms – Variety Dinner Theatre
Musical Direction	Choreography
Ed Henderson for Pump Boys and Dinettes – Variety Dinner Theatre; George Broderick for Shimmytime – Toronto Free Theatre; Charles Homewood for Nightbloom – COMUS Music Theatre	Marvin Gordon for Guys and Dolls – CentreStage; Jennifer Mascall for A Strange Manuscript Found in a Copper Cylinder – Dancemakers; Diane Nyland for Funny Girl – Warrack Productions

=== Independent Theatre Division ===
Production
- The Last Man on Earth – VideoCabaret
  - Fourteen – AKA Performance Interface
  - In The Wee Hours – 45.3
  - Life without Muscles: Growing up Artistic – Buddies in Bad Times
  - Revelations and Talking With – Mercury Theatre
  - Richard III – Actors Lab Theatre
  - This Is For You, Anna – Theatre Passe Muraille

=== Theatre for Young Audiences Division ===
Production
- Drink the Mercury – Young People's Theatre
  - New Canadian Kid – Theatre Direct Canada
  - The Nuclear Power Show – Young People's Theatre
  - Une History à Dormir Debout – Théâtre du Petit Bonheur

== See also ==
- 38th Tony Awards
- 1984 Laurence Olivier Awards
