= 1983 Dora Mavor Moore Awards =

The 1983 Dora Mavor Moore Awards celebrated excellence in theatre from the Toronto Alliance for the Performing Arts.

== Winners and nominees ==
=== General Theatre Division ===
Production	Original Play
Translations – Toronto Free Theatre and the Stratford Festival; O.D. on Paradise – Theatre Passe Muraille; The Art of War – Factory Theatre; Unseen Hand – Toronto Free Theatre	O.D. on Paradise by Patrick Brymer and Linda Griffiths – Theatre Passe Muraille; Censored by Richard Rose – Necessary Angel; The Art of War by George F. Walker – Factory Theatre; What Is to Be Done by Mavis Gallant – Tarragon Theatre
Leading Actor	Leading Actress
R. H. Thomson for Hand to Hand; Paul Latreille for Un Pays Dont la Devise Est Je M'Oublié – Théâtre Français de Toronto; Douglas Rain for The Master Builder – Tarragon Theatre; Hugh Webster for The Kite – Phoenix Theatre	Jennifer Phipps for Sister Mary Ignatius Explains It All for You; Margot Dionne for What Is to Be Done – Tarragon Theatre; Mary Haney for Translations – Toronto Free Theatre and the Stratford Festival; Martha Henry for The Crucible – Theatre Plus
Supporting Actor	Supporting Actress
Hugh Webster for Translations – Toronto Free Theatre and the Stratford Festival; James B. Douglas for Eve; Robert Drage for Unseen Hand – Toronto Free Theatre; Michael McKeever for Dead of Winter – Toronto Free Theatre	Kate Trotter for Translations – Toronto Free Theatre and the Stratford Festival; Joy Coghill for A Day in the Death of Joe Egg – Theatre Plus; Maggie Huculak for Censored – Necessary Angel; Tanja Jacobs for Censored – Necessary Angel; Margot Dionne for What Is to Be Done – Tarragon Theatre
Direction	Scenic Design
Guy Sprung for Translations – Toronto Free Theatre and the Stratford Festival; Leon Major for 'dentity Crisis and Sister Mary Ignatius Explains It All for You – Tarragon Theatre; Robin Phillips for The Prisoner of Zenda – Young People's Theatre; Guy Sprung for Dream in High Park – Toronto Free Theatre	Jim Plaxton for O.D. on Paradise – Theatre Passe Muraille; Astrid Janson for The Master Builder – Tarragon Theatre; Mark Negin for The Dresser; Phillip Silver for Translations – Toronto Free Theatre and the Stratford Festival
Costume Design	Lighting Design
Debra Hanson for Translations – Toronto Free Theatre and the Stratford Festival; Maxine Graham for Ever Loving – Theatre Plus; Astrid Janson for The Master Builder – Tarragon Theatre; John Pennoyer for The School for Wives – Théâtre Français de Toronto	Harry Frehner for Translations – Toronto Free Theatre and the Stratford Festival; Harry Frehner for The Master Builder – Tarragon Theatre; Jim Plaxton for O.D. on Paradise – Theatre Passe Muraille; Phillip Silver for The Yellow House at Arles – Tarragon Theatre

=== Musical Theatre or Revue Division ===
Production	Original Musical
Ain't Misbehavin' – Toronto Musical Productions; Last Call – Phoenix Theatre; March of the Falsettos – Stage Direction Theatrical Productions	Sid’s Kids by Allen Booth and Jane E. Foy – Voodoo Club; ACME Harpoon Company by Joe Chilco, Richard Dumont, Deborah Jarvis, Wally Kolodinski and Lindsey Leese – ACME Harpoon; I've Got a Sequel Part II by John Hemphill, Ron James, Don Lake, Bruce Pirrie, Kathleen Laskey and Debra McGrath – Second City
Actor	Actress
Denis Simpson for Ain't Misbehavin' – Toronto Musical Productions; Brian McKay for March of the Falsettos – Stage Direction Theatrical Productions; Morris Panych for Last Call – Phoenix Theatre	Sheila McCarthy for Really Rosie – Young People's Theatre; B. J. Reed for Ain't Misbehavin' – Toronto Musical Productions; Jackie Richardson for Ain't Misbehavin' – Toronto Musical Productions
Direction	Scenic Design
Joel Greenberg for Ain't Misbehavin' – Toronto Musical Productions; Susan Astley for Last Call – Phoenix Theatre; Thom Sokoloski for Sid's Kids – Voodoo Club	Astrid Janson for Cabaret – CentreStage Company; Rod Hillier for Ain't Misbehavin' – Toronto Musical Productions; Maurice Sendak for Really Rosie – Young People's Theatre
Costume Design	Lighting Design
Astrid Janson for Cabaret – CentreStage Company; Bruce Appleby and Gurteen for Sid's Kids – Voodoo Club; Susan Rome for Ain't Misbehavin' – Toronto Musical Productions	Tim Crack for Sweet Will – Bathurst Street Theatre; Scott Laurence and David Wallett for March of the Falsettos – Stage Direction Theatrical Productions; Stephen Ross for Cabaret – CentreStage Company
Musical Direction	Choreography
Rick Fox and Joe Sealy for Ain't Misbehavin' – Toronto Musical Productions; Bob Ashley for Sweet Will – Bathurst Street Theatre; Raymond Pannell for Really Rosie – Young People's Theatre	Jennifer Mascall for Sid’s Kids – Voodoo Club; Jeff Hyslop for Cabaret – CentreStage Company; Jeff Hyslop for Really Rosie – Young People's Theatre

=== Theatre for Young Audiences Division ===
Production
- The Food Show – Theatre on the Move

== See also ==
- 37th Tony Awards
- 1983 Laurence Olivier Awards
