= 6th Canadian Comedy Awards =

Festival and awards ceremony for works of 2004

- Date: 22 October 2005
- Location: London, Ontario
- Country: Canada
- Presented by: Canadian Comedy Foundation for Excellence
- Hosted by: Bruce Hunter as Rocko the Dog

Highlights
- Most wins: Television: Corner Gas (2); Film: I, Claudia (2); Person: Kristen Thomson and Levi Macdougall (2)
- Most nominations: Television: This Hour Has 22 Minutes (4); Film Ham & Cheese (6); Person: Ron Sparks (4)
- Website: www.canadiancomedyawards.org

The 6th Canadian Comedy Awards, presented by the Canadian Comedy Foundation for Excellence (CCFE), honoured the best live, television, and film comedy of 2004. The awards ceremony was held on 22 October 2005 during the five-day Canadian Comedy Awards Festival in London, Ontario. The ceremony was hosted by Bruce Hunter as Rocko the Dog.

Canadian Comedy Awards, also known as Beavers, were awarded in 20 categories. Winners were picked by members of ACTRA (Alliance of Canadian Cinema, Television and Radio Artists), the Canadian Actors' Equity Association, the Writers Guild of Canada, the Directors Guild of Canada, and the Comedy Association.

Nominations were led by the film Ham & Cheese with six nominations, followed by TV series Corner Gas and This Hour Has 22 Minutes with five apiece. Corner Gas won two Beavers, as did Kristen Thomson for the film I, Claudia and Levi Macdougall for his Comedy Now! show. The Chairman's Award went to producer Andrew Alexander of The Second City.

== Festival ==
The 6th Canadian Comedy Awards and Festival ran from 18 to 22 October 2005 in London, Ontario, its third year in the city. Each day featured talent showcases beginning with the Funniest Person in London Contest, sketch, stand-up and improv shows, and an all-star gala hosted by Seán Cullen. Among the highlights was the Jokers vs. Knights Alumni charity hockey game which mixed two of Canada's favourite pastimes, with two teams of comics, celebrities and retired professional hockey players aided by guest announcers, coaches, and musicians.

== Ceremony ==
The 6th Canadian Comedy Awards ceremony was held on 22 October 2005, hosted by Bruce Hunter as Rocko the Dog, the character he played on Puppets Who Kill. Hunter had won the Beaver for Best Male Improviser in 2001.

== Winners and nominees ==
Winners are listed first and highlighted in boldface:

=== Live ===
Best Taped Live Performance	Best Stand-up Newcomer
**Levi Macdougall – Comedy Now!**; Jason Bryden, Michael Robinson – The Lucky Eights Show; Cory Mack – Yuk Yuk's Calgary Stampede	**Mark Forward**; Aaron Berg; Jon Steinberg; Tommy Campbell; Trevor Boris
Best Male Stand-up	Best Female Stand-up
**Mike Wilmot**; Alan Park; Glen Foster; Jay Malone; Pete Zedlacher	**Nikki Payne**; Cory Mack; Debra DiGiovanni; Kate Davis; Martha Chaves
Best Male Improviser	Best Female Improviser
**Doug Morency**; Dan Joffre; David Shore; Graham Wagner; Ian Boothby	**Lisa Merchant**; Becky Johnson; Diana Frances; Ellie Harvie; Janet van de Graaf
Best Sketch Troupe or Company	Best Improv Troupe or Company
**The Imponderables**; The Minnesota Wrecking Crew; Reid Along with Browning; The Sketchersons; Women Fully Clothed	**Slap Happy**; Iron Cobra; Monkey Toast; The Williamson Playboys; Urban Improv
Best One Person Show	Best Comedic Play, Revue or Series
**From the Desk of Ron Sparks**; A Small Battalion of Soldiers; One Man Harold; That Improv Guy Show; The Wizard of Coz	**Dickwhipped**; Overlords!; Sword Play; The Kupps Runneth Over; The Williamson Playboys

=== Television ===
Best Performance by a Male	Best Performance by a Female
**Brent Butt – Corner Gas**; Fred Ewanuick – Corner Gas; Ron Pederson – Mad TV; Craig Lauzon – Royal Canadian Air Farce; Shaun Majumder – This Hour Has 22 Minutes	**Samantha Bee – The Daily Show**; Nancy Robertson – Corner Gas; Jessica Holmes – Royal Canadian Air Farce; Jennifer Irwin – Slings & Arrows; Cathy Jones – This Hour Has 22 Minutes
Best Direction in a Series	Best Direction in a Special or episode
**David Storey – Corner Gas**; Michael Kennedy – Listen Missy; Adrian Carter, Denny Silverthorne – Odd Job Jack; Shawn Alex Thompson – Puppets Who Kill; Peter Wellington – Slings & Arrows	**Stephen Reynolds – This Hour Has 22 Minutes**, cycle 12 episode 16; Deborah Day – Getting Along Famously; Henry Sarwer-Foner – Hatching, Matching and Dispatching; Adrian Carter – Odd Job Jack – "Fantasy Atoll"; Denny Silverthorne – Odd Job Jack – "American Wiener"
Best Writing in a Series	Best Writing in a Special or episode
**Bob Martin, Susan Coyne** and **Mark McKinney** – **Slings & Arrows**; Paul Mather, Kevin White, Mark Farrell, Brent Butt, Andrew Carr – Corner Gas; John Pattison – Puppets Who Kill; Alan Park, Craig Lauzon – Royal Canadian Air Farce; Kevin White, Cathy Jones, Gary Pearson, Barry Julien, Irwin Barker, Mark Critch, Ron Sparks, Gavin Crawford, Jennifer Whalen, Geri Hall, Greg Thomey – This Hour Has 22 Minutes	**Levi Macdougall** – **Comedy Now!**; Colin Mochrie – Getting Along Famously; Greg Lawrence – Kevin Spencer – "The Buck Stops Here"; Jeremy Diamond, Tim Polley – Odd Job Jack – "American Wiener"; Kevin White, Gary Pearson, Barry Julien, Irwin Barker, Mark Critch, Ron Sparks, Gavin Crawford, Jennifer Whalen, Geri Hall, Cathy Jones – This Hour Has 22 Minutes – episode #12.12

=== Film ===
Best Performance by a Male	Best Performance by a Female
**Mike Wilmot** – **It's All Gone Pete Tong**; Ryan Belleville – Going the Distance; Jason Jones – Ham & Cheese; Mike Beaver – Ham & Cheese; Gord Rand – Wading In	**Kristen Thomson** – **I, Claudia**; Jennifer Baxter – Ham & Cheese; Samantha Bee – Ham & Cheese; Shauna MacDonald – The Porcelain Pussy
Best Direction	Best Writing
**Denise Blinn** – **The Porcelain Pussy**; Warren P. Sonoda – Ham & Cheese; Tim Burton – Wading In	**Kristen Thomson – I, Claudia**; Jason Jones, Mike Beaver – Ham & Cheese; Andrew Kelm – The Porcelain Pussy

=== Special awards ===
Chairman's Award
- **Andrew Alexander**

== Multiple wins ==
The following people, shows, films, etc. received multiple awards

Awards	Person or work
2	Corner Gas
2	Kristen Thomson / I, Claudia
2	Levi Macdougall / Comedy Now!

== Multiple nominations ==
The following people, shows, films, etc. received multiple nominations

Nominations	Person or work
6	Ham & Cheese
5	Corner Gas
5	This Hour Has 22 Minutes
4	Odd Job Jack
3	The Porcelain Pussy
3	Royal Canadian Air Farce
2	Getting Along Famously
2	Levi Macdougall
2	Puppets Who Kill
2	Slings & Arrows
2	Wading In
