= Philip Akin =

Canadian actor

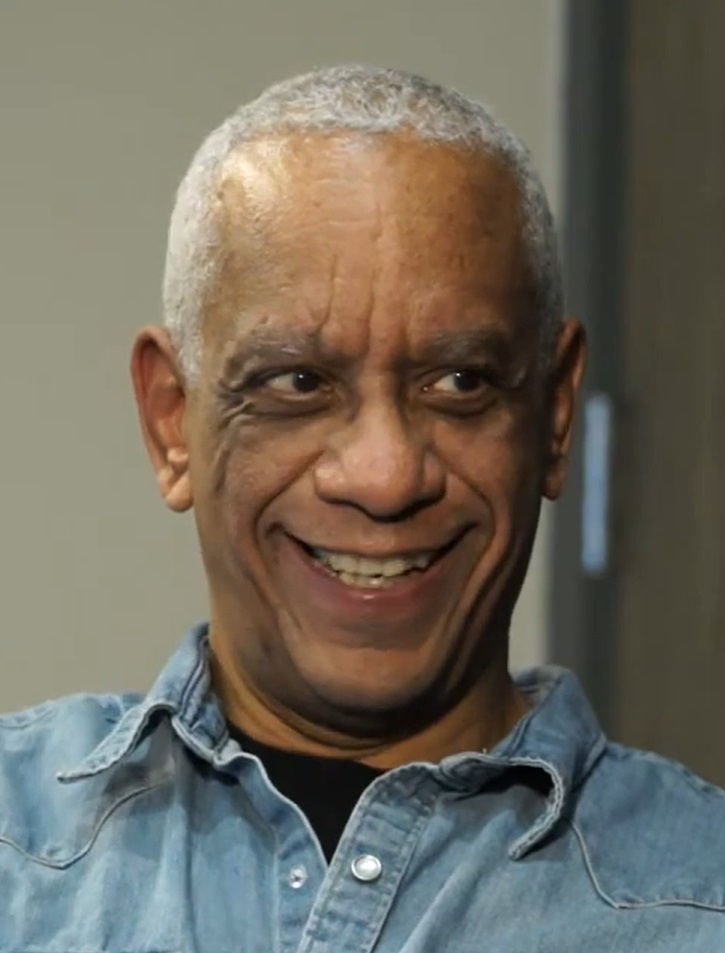
- Akin in 2019
- Born: April 18, 1950 (age 76); Kingston, Surrey County, Jamaica
- Education: Ryerson Polytechnical Institute (now Toronto Metropolitan University)
- Occupation: Actor
- Years active: 1975–present

Philip David Boothe Akin CM (born April 18, 1950) is a Canadian actor of Jamaican heritage.

Akin has been acting and directing for over 40 years. He has had roles in American films such as The Sum of All Fears, S.W.A.T., and Get Rich or Die Tryin'. He has also done much voice work, including voicing the character of Bishop for the X-Men animated series and Tripp Hansen in Monster Force.

== Life and career ==
Akin was born in Kingston, Jamaica, as a middle brother of five sons. His parents moved to Oshawa, Ontario in 1953, and he and his brothers followed suit the next year. He has lived in Ontario ever since. Shortly after attending high school, Akin attended Toronto's Ryerson Theatre School. In 1975, he became the school's first acting graduate, landing a role just a few days later in a Shaw Festival production of Caesar and Cleopatra.

In 1983, Akin began studying Yoshinkan aikido and is presently a 5th degree black belt in that art. He has also trained in Jing Mo kung fu and tai chi.

Akin first came to prominence in the early 1980s when he performed on the zany comedy series Bizarre. Other noteworthy roles include boxer Kid Cornelius in the "Shadow Boxer" episode of Friday the 13th: The Series (1987) and his regular role as the wheelchair-using computer expert Norton Drake in the first season of War of the Worlds, a sci-fi television series (1988–90). His recurring role as Charlie DeSalvo in Highlander: The Series has also brought him much recognition. In Shake Hands with the Devil, he portrays Kofi Annan, then United Nations Under-Secretary-General for Peacekeeping Operations. In 2007, Akin performed at the Stratford Festival of Canada, a prestigious summer-long celebration of theatre held each year in Stratford, Ontario, Canada. He was cast in the title role of William Shakespeare's Othello, and also in the role of Crooks in the Festival's rendition of John Steinbeck's novella Of Mice and Men. Philip Akin can also be seen in a long list of guest appearances on television series for example: F/X: The Series, Mutant X, Flashpoint (2008) and most recently, The Expanse (2015).

Akin is a founding member and was the artistic director (2006–2020) of the Obsidian Theatre Company, a Canadian theatre company comprising seasoned actors of African and Caribbean descent, devoted to the work of Black artists and creators. He won the Dora Mavor Moore Award for Outstanding Direction of a Play/Musical in 2012 for his production of Suzan-Lori Parks' Topdog/Underdog, which starred Kevin Hanchard and Nigel Shawn Williams. In his role he helped foster mentorship programs aimed at Black theatre directors.

In the final year of his tenure as artistic director of Obsidian, Akin was awarded the biennial Herbert Whittaker Award for Distinguished Contribution to Canadian Theatre - and was named one of the Canadian artists of 2019 by The Globe and Mail. Upon his departure from Obsidian, the theatre established The Black Shoulders Award in Aikin's honour, to be awarded to Black artists to pursue their craft.

Akin was the director for the Shaw Festival's 2020 production of Trouble in Mind by Alice Childress.

In 2026, he was named as an Member of the Order of Canada. He lives in Toronto.

== Filmography ==
=== Film ===
- Three Card Monte (1978) – Monte Player
- Running (1979) – Chuck Stone
- Improper Channels (1981) – Motorcycle Cop
- Gas (1981) – Lincoln Jones
- Covergirl (1983) – Cairo
- Iceman (1984) – Dr. Fisterpoon
- Martin's Day (1985) – Cop 1
- Prettykill (Tomorrow's a Killer) (1987) – Joey
- Nowhere to Hide (1987) – Harvey
- Blue Monkey (1987) – Anthony Rivers
- Switching Channels (1988) – Guard
- Millennium (1989) – Kevin Briley
- Stella (1990) – Police Officer
- F/X2 (1991) – Det. McQuay
- The Big Slice (1991) – Reggie / Regina
- Married to It (1991) – Limo Driver
- The Ref (1994) – State Trooper
- The Stupids (1996) – Henchman #1
- Fly Away Home (1996) – Air Force Reporter
- Woo (1998) – Roger Smith
- Airborne (1998) – Romeo Cortez
- Down in the Delta (1998) – Manager
- One Tough Cop (1998) – Insp. Cheney
- Pushing Tin (1999) – Paul
- In Too Deep (1999) – Minister
- Left Behind (2000) – Alan Tompkins
- The Sum of All Fears (2002) – General Wilkes
- The Skulls III (2002, video) – Captain Harlan
- Cube 2: Hypercube (2002) – The General
- How to Deal (2003) – Mr. Bowden
- S.W.A.T. (2003) – Hijacked Passenger (uncredited)
- The Perfect Man (2005) – English Teacher
- The Man (2005) – Second I.A. Agent
- Get Rich or Die Tryin' (2005) – Reverend
- Bottom Feeder (2007) – Sarge
- Shake Hands with the Devil (2007) – Kofi Annan
- This Beautiful City (2007) – Police Chief
- P2 (2007) – Karl
- Robocop (2014) – Dr. Alan

=== Television ===
ACTOR television credits
Year	Title	Role	Notes	Ref.
1980–1982	The Littlest Hobo	Policemand / Becker	3 episodes	
1982	Shocktrauma	Sam Hooker	TV movie	
1985–1987	Night Heat	(various)	7 episodes	
1986	The Park Is Mine	Hardy	TV movie	
1986	The High Price of Passion	Locksmith	TV movie	
1987	Friday the 13th: The Series	Kid Cornelius	1 episode	
1987	Starcom: The U.S. Space Force	Col. John "Slim" Griffin (voice)	13 episodes	
1988–1989	War of the Worlds	Norton Drake	25 episodes	
1991	Swamp Thing	Bayou Jack	5 episodes	
1990–1993	Top Cops	Delbert Marion / Aldin Sims / Irving Robinson	3 episodes	
1992	Quiet Killer	Dr. Henshaw	TV movie	
1992–1995	X-Men: The Animated Series	Bishop / Lucas Bishop	7 episodes	
1993–1995	Highlander: The Series	Charlie DeSalvo	17 episodes	
1993	Liar, Liar: Between Father and Daughter	Dr. Kerr	TV movie	
1993	Counterstrike	The Detective	Episode: "Free to Kill"	
1996	Ed McBain's 87th Precinct: Ice	Det. Arthur Brown	TV movie	
1996	The Haunting of Lisa	Sgt. Hill	TV movie	
1996	Talk to Me	Public Defender	TV movie	
1996	Traders	Carl Davison	7 episodes	
1997	...First Do No Harm	Unknown	TV movie	
1997	Elvis Meets Nixon	Cabbie	TV movie	
1997	Time to Say Goodbye?	Airport Police Officer	TV movie	
1997	The Don's Analyst	Dr. Lusting	TV movie	
1997	Ms. Scrooge	George	TV movie	
1997	The New Ghostwriter Mysteries	MIles Robeson	3 episodes	
1997–2000	PSI Factor: Chronicles of the Paranormal	Aubrey / Military Man	2 episodes	
1998	Giving Up the Ghost	Judge Gleason	TV movie	
1998	Highlander: The Raven	Simon Clark	1 episode	
1998	The Taking of Pelham One Two Three	ESU lieutenant	TV movie	
1998	Goosebumps	Bob Erikson	3 episodes	
1999	Deep in My Heart	Ob-gyn doctor	TV movie	
1999	To Love, Honor & Betray	Det. Gonda	TV movie	
1999	Strange Justice	Charles Ogletree	TV movie	
1999	The Avengers: United They Stand	Attuma (voice)	1 episode	
2000	All-American Girl: The Mary Kay Letourneau Story	Det. Albany	TV movie	
2000	Caitlin's Way	Mr. Watson	4 episodes	
2000	Who Killed Atlanta's Children?	Police Spokesman	TV movie	
2000	One Kill	Gunnery Sgt. Finch	TV movie	
2000	Relic Hunter	Budur	1 episode	
2000	One True Love	Mark	TV movie	
2000	Range of Motion	Flozell	TV movie	
2001	Blackout	First Official	TV movie	
2001	Bojangles	Williamson	TV movie	
2002	Pretend You Don't See Her	Witness Protection Agent	TV movie	
2002	The Red Sneakers	Mr. Seabrooke	TV movie	
2002	Mutant X	General Sutton	1 episode	
2002	Second String	Dr. Grantham	TV movie	
2004	H_{2}O	U.S. President Monroe		
2005	Knights of the South Bronx	Asst. Principal Hill	TV movie	
2008	Friends and Heroes	Isaac / John Ralston	13 episodes	
2008–2011	Flashpoint	Commander Norm Holleran / Commander Holleran	5 episodes	
2009	Taking a Chance on Love	Jules Grandfield	TV movie	
2010	Who Is Clark Rockefeller?	Det. Lewis Cook	TV movie	
2011	Lost Girl	Tshombe	1 episode	
2012	King	Drew Bannon	1 episode	
2012	Covert Affairs	Greg McCarthy	1 episode	
2013	Prosecuting Casey Anthony	Judge Belvin Perry	TV movie	
2014	The Best Laid Plans	Managing Editor	3 episodes	
2015	The Book of Negroes	John Cartwright	1 episode	
2015–2016	The Expanse	Craig	3 episodes	
2018	In Contempt	Judge Cannon	1 episode	
2018	Love, of Course	Edward Seton	TV movie	
