= Glassco =

Glassco is a surname. Notable people with the surname include:

- Bill Glassco (1935–2004), Canadian theatre director
- John Glassco (1909–1981), Canadian poet, memoirist, and novelist
