= Chris Abraham =

Chris Abraham (born 1974) is a Canadian theatre director, most noted as the artistic director of the Crow's Theatre company in Toronto, Ontario since 2007.

Originally from Montreal, Quebec, he studied theatre at the University of Toronto and the National Theatre School of Canada. He was subsequently one of the founding partners in Go Chicken Go, a theatre company of recent NTS graduates. Productions he directed for Go Chicken Go included Peter Handke's Offending the Audience, Anton Piatigorsky's Easy Lenny Lazmon and the Great Western Ascension, Darren O'Donnell's Boxhead, and Abraham's own adaptation of Georg Büchner's Lenz.

In 2001 he was the director of Kristen Thomson's stage play I, Claudia. He subsequently also directed a film adaptation, which premiered at the 2004 Toronto International Film Festival and was named to TIFF's year-end Canada's Top Ten list.

He took over artistic direction of Crow's Theatre in 2007, following the retirement of the company's founding artistic director Jim Millan.

He is married to actress Liisa Repo-Martell.

== Awards ==
Award	Year	Category	Work	Result	Ref(s)
Dora Mavor Moore Awards	1999	Best Direction, Independent Theatre	Easy Lenny Lazmon and the Great Western Ascension	Won	
Dora Mavor Moore Awards	1999	Outstanding Set Design, Independent Theatre	Easy Lenny Lazmon and the Great Western Ascension	Nominated	
Dora Mavor Moore Awards	1999	Outstanding New Play or Musical, Independent Theatre	Lenz	Nominated	
Dora Mavor Moore Awards	2001	Best Direction, Independent Theatre	Boxhead	Nominated	
Dora Mavor Moore Awards	2003	Best Direction, General Theatre	Russell Hill	Nominated	
Dora Mavor Moore Awards	2006	Best Direction, Independent Theatre	Cringeworthy	Nominated	
Dora Mavor Moore Awards	2007	Best Direction, General Theatre	Insomnia	Nominated	
Dora Mavor Moore Awards	2009	Best Direction, General Theatre	I, Claudia	Nominated	
Dora Mavor Moore Awards	2009	Best Direction, Independent Theatre	Eternal Hydra	Won	
Dora Mavor Moore Awards	2013	Best Direction, General Theatre	The Little Years	Won	
Dora Mavor Moore Awards	2013	Best Direction, General Theatre	Someone Else	Nominated	
Dora Mavor Moore Awards	2020	Best Direction, General Theatre	Julius Caesar	Nominated	
Dora Mavor Moore Awards	2024	Best Direction, General Theatre	The Master Plan	Nominated	
Dora Mavor Moore Awards	2024	Outstanding Creative Direction (Director), Musical Theatre Division	Natasha, Pierre & the Great Comet of 1812	Won	
Gemini Awards	2005	Best Direction in a Dramatic Program or Mini-Series	I, Claudia	Won	
Siminovitch Prize in Theatre	2001	Protégé	Self	Won	
Siminovitch Prize in Theatre	2013	Recipient	Self	Won	
