= Nina Lee Aquino =

Filipino-Canadian theatre director

Nina Lee Aquino is a Filipino-Canadian theatre director who was the founding artistic director of Toronto's fu-GEN Asian Canadian Theatre Company.

== Career ==
In 2012 she was appointed artistic director of Toronto's Factory Theatre. After a ten-year tenure at Factory, she was named artistic director of English Theatre at Canada's National Arts Centre in Ottawa, Ontario. Aquino is credited with a string of firsts in Asian Canadian theatre: she organized the first Asian Canadian theatre conference; she edited the first Asian Canadian play anthology, and she co-edited the first book on Asian Canadian theatre. She also currently serves as the president of the Professional Association of Canadian Theatres (PACT). Aquino has won three Dora Mavor Moore awards and the Toronto Theatre Critics Award.

Over the last decade, Aquino has directed multiple seminal Canadian productions at major Canadian theatre companies including Soulpepper Theatre, Tarragon, and the Shaw Festival.
