= Micheline Chevrier =

Canadian director, dramaturge and teacher

- Born: 1958 (age 67–68)
- Occupation: Director Dramaturge Artistic Director
- Years active: 1982–present

Micheline Chevrier (born 1958) is a bilingual Canadian theatre director, artistic director, dramaturge, mentor and teacher in Montreal.

== Early life ==
Born in Val-d'Or, Quebec to Franco-Ontarian parents, Chevrier moved to Montreal in 1963. She graduated from McGill University in 1980 (BA in English/Theatre) and then received a Master's degree from the University of Toronto's Drama Centre in Dramatic Literature in 1982.

== Career ==
As a director, Chevrier has worked at such theatres as The Shaw Festival, the National Arts Centre, Theatre Calgary, Alberta Theatre Projects, the Citadel, l’UniThéâtre, Globe Theatre, Prairie Theatre Exchange, Royal Manitoba Theatre Centre, Canadian Stage, Young People’s Theatre, Théâtre français de Toronto, Tarragon Theatre, Centaur Theatre, Segal Centre, Geordie Productions, Imago Theatre and Theatre New Brunswick. She has also worked with BeMe Productions in both Barcelona and Munich.

Micheline has directed nearly 100 productions. Her directorial credits include works by playwrights such as Edward Albee, Berthold Brecht, Anton Chekhov, Caryl Churchill, Euripides, Dario Fo, debbie tucker green, Molière, Phyllis Nagy, Lynn Nottage, Sarah Ruhl, Shakespeare, and George Bernard Shaw. She has also directed plays by Canadian and Québécois writers such as Michel Marc Bouchard, Carole Fréchette, David French, Amy Lee Lavoie, Ann-Marie Macdonald, Hannah Moscovitch, Colleen Murphy, John Murrell, Omari Newton, Erin Shields, Judith Thompson, Michel Tremblay, Pierre-Michel Tremblay, and Paula Wing.

In 1986, then living in Toronto, Chevrier co-created the Writers' Workshop Theatre, which promoted the work of lesser-known women playwrights. In 1990, she became the Associate Artistic Director at Theatre New Brunswick in Fredericton, before taking on the role of Associate Dramaturge at Playwright's Workshop Montreal in 1992.

Chevrier became the Artistic Director of the Great Canadian Theatre Company in Ottawa in 1995, where she programmed four seasons, all thematically based and all Canadian; introduced several francophone playwrights into the programming; formed a partnership with the National Arts Centre to develop local artists including directors, actors and playwrights, specifically women theatre makers, and developing projects that involved both francophone and anglophone artists; focused on the promotion of young women directors throughout her tenure; helped increase funding from all levels of government and contributed to a significant rise in attendance through core programming. In 2007-2008, Chevrier was the co-director of the Production Program at the National Theatre School of Canada, where she led a renewal of the program's mandate and philosophy.

First joining Imago Theatre in 2011 as an Associate Director, Chevrier became its Artistic and Executive director from 2013 to 2022. Under Chevrier's leadership, Imago officially became a feminist and artist-run theatre company. At Imago, Chevrier led a revision of the mission, in partnership with team and board, to centre feminist practices and women’s stories in programming and all activities; programmed seasons featuring works that offer a feminist perspective; worked in partnership with other Montreal theatre companies and various organizations to develop and present works reflecting the diversity of the city; supported the development of women theatre artists through various programs such as mentorships, artist residencies, commissioning of new works and training programs; created a lateral leadership structure for the company; established a first-time policy of accessibility, both financial and physical, as well as an anti-harassment policy for both staff and artists; expanded the programming to include various forms of storytelling including digital platforms, circus arts, radio drama and site response performances.

Chevrier has directed, taught, and coached at several educational institutions including the National Theatre School, Concordia University, and York University.

== Awards and honours ==
Award	Nominated/Won	Category	Play	Theatre Company
Guthrie Award	Won	N/A	For individuals committed to Justice	Stratford Festival
Betty Mitchell Award	Nominated	Direction	The Glace Bay Miner's Museum	Alberta Theatre Projects
Betty Mitchell Award	Won	Direction	Perfect Pie	Alberta Theatre Projects
Capital Critics Circle Award	Won	Production	The Vaudevilles of Chekhov	National Arts Centre
Capital Critics Circle Award	Won	Direction	LifeX3	Great Canadian Theatre Company
Dora Mavor Moore Award	Won	Production	The December Man	Canadian Stage
Dora Mavor Moore Award	Nominated	Direction	The December Man	Canadian Stage
Montreal English Theatre Award	Won	Direction	Top Girls	Segal Centre
Montreal English Theatre Award	Nominated	Direction	If We Were Birds	Imago Theatre
Montreal English Theatre Award	Won	Production	If We Were Birds	Imago Theatre
Montreal English Theatre Award	Nominated	Direction	random	Imago Theatre
Montreal English Theatre Award	Nominated	Production	random	Imago Theatre
Montreal English Theatre Award	Won	Direction	An Intractable Woman	Imago Theatre
Montreal English Theatre Award	Nominated	Production	An Intractable Woman	Imago Theatre
Betty Mitchell Award	Nominated	Direction	The Scarlet Letter	Theatre Calgary
Sims Family Award	Won	N/A	for Excellence in Teaching	National Theatre School of Canada
The Bra d'Or Award	Won	N/A	for Supporting Women's Playwrights	Playwrights Guild of Canada
Montreal English Theatre Award	Nominated	Direction	Redbone Coonhound	Imago Theatre and Tarragon Theatre
