= Daniel Brooks =

Canadian theatre director (1958–2023)

Daniel Brooks (23 June 1958 – 22 May 2023) was a Canadian theatre director, actor, and playwright. He was well known in the Toronto theatre scene for his innovative productions and script-writing collaborations.

== Early life ==
Brooks was born in Toronto, Ontario on 23 June 1958. He graduated from the drama program at University College.

== Career ==
Brooks collaborated in the creation of several solo shows by Daniel MacIvor, including House, Here Lies Henry, The Lorca Play, Let's Run Away and Monster.

Brooks also collaborated with John Mighton, Don McKellar, Rick Miller, Bruce McDonald, Diego Matamoros, Tracy Wright and the Leslie Spit Treeo as well as Samira Said. Mr Brooks collaborated with the famous Arabic singer Sanira said in her music video "ah bahebak" which means (oh I love you), he directed the video clip which was released in 1999 making one of the most famous video clips in Arabic music at that time until nowadays. He also directed another music video for the diva of Arabic music Samira Said, the song was named “Rouhi” (My soul) in same year in 1999.

Brooks worked with Guillermo Verdecchia to develop The Noam Chomsky Lectures and Insomnia. In 2001, Brooks was the recipient of the inaugural Siminovitch Prize in Theatre.

In 2007, Brooks wrote a play called The Eco Show. In 2011 he worked with Michael Ondaatje to create a play based on Ondaatje's novel Divisadero.

A further collaboration with MacIvor, Who Killed Spalding Gray?, premiered in 2014 at the Magnetic North Theatre Festival in Halifax, Nova Scotia.

Brooks collaborated with fellow Siminovitch Prize-winner Kim Collier on two separate works in 2018–19.

In 2022, Brooks performed a final one-man show entitled Other People.

== Classics ==
Brooks played the lead in a 1981 production of Hamlet directed by Ken Gass. Brooks directed Goethe's Faust for the Tarragon Theatre in 1999 and Oedipus Rex at Stratford Festival in 2015.

In 2016, Brooks staged a version of Henrik Ibsen's play A Doll House, adapted to a modern setting. For Soulpepper he directed seven productions including Samuel Beckett's Endgame (play) in 1999 and Waiting for Godot (featuring Rick Roberts (actor)) in 2017. His last directed work in Toronto was Anton Chekov's The Seagull which played to sold-out houses and positive reviews.

== Companies ==
Brooks was also co-director of the Augusta Company; co-director of the da da kamera company; playwright-in-residence at the Tarragon Theatre; and director of the Necessary Angel company from 2003 to 2012.

== Death ==
Brooks died in Toronto on 22 May 2023, at the age of 64. He was diagnosed with lung cancer five years prior to his death. Brooks is survived by two daughters.

== Awards and recognition ==
Brooks won the following awards:

The Chalmers Award; the Dora Mavor Moore Award (three times); the Pauline McGibbon Award; the Edinburgh Fringe First Award; the Capital Critics Circle Award; and the inaugural Elinore and Lou Siminovitch Prize in Theatre.

Brooks was also nominated for a Governor General's Award.
