= Topdog/Underdog =

Play by Suzan-Lori Parks, premiered 2001

- 2022 Broadway playbill
- Original language: English
- Written by: Suzan-Lori Parks

Premiere
- Date: July 26, 2001
- Place: The Public Theater

Topdog/Underdog is a play by American playwright Suzan-Lori Parks that premiered in 2001 off-Broadway in New York City. The next year it opened on Broadway, at the Ambassador Theatre, where it played for several months. In 2002, Parks received the Pulitzer Prize for Drama and the Outer Critics Circle Award for the play; it received other awards for the director and cast. In 2023, it won the Tony Award for Best Revival of a Play.

== Plot ==
The play chronicles the adult lives of two African-American brothers as they cope with poverty, racism, work, women, and their troubled upbringings. Lincoln lives with Booth, his younger brother, after being thrown out by his wife. Booth reminds Lincoln that his presence was meant to be a temporary arrangement. But Lincoln, who works at an arcade as a whiteface Abraham Lincoln impersonator, is their only source of income.

While the work is honest, both brothers find it humiliating. Booth repeatedly attempts to persuade Lincoln to return to running games of three-card monte. Lincoln had sworn off the hustle after one of his crew had been shot dead, believing he would be next. Idolizing his brother's former glory, Booth aspires to become a three-card monte card sharp, frequently practicing the routine in his apartment, although his act is awkward; his own talent lies in shoplifting.

Booth is preoccupied with a woman named Grace whom he tries to impress with shoplifted luxuries. He boasts to his brother about their relationship, but in truth she spurns his advances. Lincoln reveals that his wife Cookie had misread his depression as lack of interest in her, before she threw him out and slept with Booth. In the present, Lincoln is about to be laid off, replaced at his job by a wax model. Booth suggests that Lincoln save his job by vividly acting out Abraham Lincoln's death throes after the customers shoot him with the provided blank—an idea they rehearse before abandoning.

The brothers reflect on their past together: Their parents deserted them as teenagers. Each parent, before leaving with a new lover, left one brother $500 in cash, which they refer to as their "inheritance". Lincoln spent his; Booth saved and hid his, never even opening the stocking that held it.

After losing his job at the arcade, Lincoln returns to three-card monte the next day and comes home exuberant. Meanwhile, Booth boasts that Grace has proposed marriage to him. Lincoln suggests that Booth find employment in order to keep Grace, calling his card shark abilities "double left-handed." Insulted, Booth challenges him to a game of three-card monte. Lincoln leads him to believe that he can win, inducing Booth to wager his $500 inheritance on the game before beating him. Laughing, Lincoln explains that the conceit behind three-card monte is that the dealer always decides when he wins. Over Booth's protests, he tries to open the stocking containing the inheritance. An agitated Booth reveals that he had shot Grace. Lincoln attempts to return the inheritance, but Booth dares him to open it instead.

As Lincoln cuts the stocking, Booth brings a gun to Lincoln's neck and shoots him. Booth rants at his brother's corpse for mocking him and stealing his inheritance, before crumpling and sobbing over the dead body.

== Production history ==
Topdog/Underdog opened off-Broadway at the Public Theater on July 26, 2001, and closed on September 2, 2001. Directed by George C. Wolfe, the play starred Don Cheadle (as Booth) and Jeffrey Wright (as Lincoln). The play opened on Broadway at the Ambassador Theatre on April 7, 2002, and closed on August 11, 2002. Cheadle was replaced by Mos Def; directed by George C. Wolfe. The play transferred to London at the Royal Court Theatre in 2003, with the same Broadway cast, and directed by Wolfe.

In September 2012, Topdog/Underdog was produced by the Two River Theater Company in Red Bank, New Jersey.

A 2011 production at the Shaw Festival in Canada starred Kevin Hanchard (as Booth) and Nigel Shawn Williams (as Lincoln). This production had a second run at The Theatre Centre in Toronto later in the same year through Obsidian Theatre Company. Hanchard and Williams were both nominated for Outstanding Performance by a Male in a Principal Role – Play at the 2012 Dora Mavor Moore Awards; Williams won the award. Director Philip Akin also won the Dora for Outstanding Direction of a Play/Musical.

In 2022, the play was revived on Broadway 20 years after its initial debut, directed by Kenny Leon and starring Corey Hawkins (as Lincoln) and Yahya Abdul-Mateen II (as Booth). It ran at the Golden Theatre, previewing on September 27, 2022, officially opening on October 20, 2022, and closing on January 15, 2023. The production won the Tony Award for Best Revival of a Play.

== Background ==
Parks commented on the play: "I think the meaning of the play isn’t just confined to a man's experience... I think it's about what it means to be family and, in the biggest sense, the family of man, what it means to be connected with somebody else." She noted that the play speaks to "who the world thinks you’re going to be, and how you struggle with that."

== Reception ==
Critic Ben Brantley of The New York Times wrote:

The play, first produced downtown at the Joseph Papp Public Theater last year, vibrates with the clamor of big ideas, audaciously and exuberantly expressed. Like Invisible Man, Ralph Ellison's landmark novel of 1952, Topdog/Underdog considers nothing less than the existential traps of being African-American and male in the United States, the masks that wear the men as well as vice versa. But don't think for a second that Ms. Parks is delivering a lecture or reciting a ponderous poem. Under the bravura direction of George C. Wolfe, a man who understands that showmanship and intellectual substance are not mutually exclusive, 'Topdog/Underdog' is a deeply theatrical experience.

The play won the 2002 Pulitzer Prize for Drama. The Pulitzer committee wrote of the play:

"A darkly comic fable of brotherly love and family identity, Topdog/Underdog tells the story of Lincoln and Booth, two brothers whose names, given to them as a joke, foretell a lifetime of sibling rivalry and resentment. Haunted by their past, the brothers are forced to confront the shattering reality of their future."

Topdog/Underdog topped a 2018 list by The New York Times of the greatest American plays of the past 25 years. Andy Propst of Time Out ranked it the 24th greatest play ever written.

== Album ==
MCA released an album of music associated with Topdog/Underdog in 2002. The tracklist features original works by Mos Def and Jeffrey Wright, as well as Muddy Waters (whose band Parks's husband Paul Oscher played harmonica in) and other blues musicians.

No.	Title	Music	Length
1.	"3 Card"	Mos Def	2:55
2.	"Face of the Deep"	Wayne Shorter	5:29
3.	"Papa's Got a Brand New Bag, Pt. 1"	James Brown	2:07
4.	"Change the Game"	Memphis Bleek, Jay-Z, Beanie Sigel & Static	3:10
5.	"Grinnin' in Your Face"	Son House	2:07
6.	"Got My Mojo Workin'"	Muddy Waters	2:51
7.	"Bring Your Whole Crew"	DMX	3:42
8.	"Poor Boy"	Howlin' Wolf	2:34
9.	"Hell Hound on My Trail"	Robert Johnson	2:36
10.	"Boom Boom"	John Lee Hooker	2:40
11.	"Let My Niggas Live"	Wu-Tang Clan & Nas	3:51
12.	"Lincoln's Blues"	Jeffrey Wright	1:42
Total length:			35:44

== Awards and nominations ==
=== Original Off-Broadway production ===
- 2001-2002 Obie Award, Performance (Wright) and Direction (Wolfe) (winners)

=== Original Broadway production ===
- 2002 Pulitzer Prize for Drama
- 2002 Outer Critics Circle Award, Outstanding Director of a Play (Wolfe)
- 2001-2002 Outer Critics Circle Award, Outstanding John Glassner Award, Playwriting, Parks (winner)
- 2001-2002 Outer Critics Circle Award, Outstanding Special Achievement Award. Wright (winner)
- 2001-2002 Outer Critics Circle Award, Outstanding Special Achievement Award, Mos Def (winner)
- 2002 Lucille Lortel Award, Outstanding Actor, Jeffrey Wright (nominee)
- 2002 Drama Desk Award, Outstanding Play (nominee)
- 2002 Drama Desk Award, Outstanding Actor, Jeffrey Wright (nominee)
- 2002 Tony Award, Best Play (nominee)
- 2002 Tony Award, Best Actor in Play (Wright) (nominee)

=== 2022 Broadway revival ===
Year	Award	Category	Nominee	Result
2023	Tony Awards	Best Revival of a Play		Won
2023	Tony Awards	Best Leading Actor in a Play	Yahya Abdul-Mateen II	Nominated
2023	Tony Awards	Best Leading Actor in a Play	Corey Hawkins	Nominated
2023	Drama League Awards	Distinguished Performance Award	Yahya Abdul-Mateen II	Nominated
2023	Drama League Awards	Distinguished Performance Award	Corey Hawkins	Nominated
2023	Drama League Awards	Outstanding Revival of a Play		Nominated
2023	Drama League Awards	Outstanding Direction of a Play	Kenny Leon	Nominated
2023	Outer Critics Circle Awards	Best Revival of a Play (Broadway or Off-Broadway)		Won
2023	Outer Critics Circle Awards	Best Director of a Play	Kenny Leon	Nominated
2023	Outer Critics Circle Awards	Best Lead Performer in a Broadway Play	Corey Hawkins	Nominated
2023	Outer Critics Circle Awards	Best Costume Design (Play or Musical)	Dede Ayite	Nominated
2023	Theatre World Award		Yahya Abdul-Mateen II	Honoree
