= I, Claudia =

- Directed by: Chris Abraham
- Written by: Kristen Thomson
- Produced by: Brent Barclay; Andrea Glinski; Jennifer Kawaja; Julia Sereny
- Starring: Kristen Thomson
- Cinematography: Kim Derko
- Edited by: David Wharnsby
- Music by: Christopher Dedrick
- Production company: Sienna Films
- Distributed by: Mongrel Media
- Release date: September 12, 2004 (Toronto International Film Festival)
- Running time: 75 minutes
- Country: Canada
- Language: English

I, Claudia is a one-woman play starring Kristen Thomson, which was subsequently adapted into a film that premiered at the 2004 Toronto International Film Festival and was subsequently shown on CBC Television's arts anthology series Opening Night.

The play and film, written by Thomson, is a coming-of-age drama depicting the difficult transition into adolescence of Claudia, a 12-year-old girl struggling with her parents' divorce. Thomson plays all of the roles, using masks to change character.

I, Claudia was published in 2001 by Playwrights Canada Press.

The 2004 film was directed by Chris Abraham, the same director as the original stage play. It was named to TIFF's year-end Canada's Top Ten list.

== Awards ==
Award	Year	Category	Recipient	Result	Ref(s)
Dora Mavor Moore Awards	2001	Best Production, General Theatre	Tarragon Theatre	Nominated	
Dora Mavor Moore Awards	2001	Best Original Play, General Theatre	Kristen Thomson	Won	
Dora Mavor Moore Awards	2001	Best Leading Actress, General Theatre	Kristen Thomson	Won	
Dora Mavor Moore Awards	2001	Best Set Design, General Theatre	Julie Fox	Nominated	
Dora Mavor Moore Awards	2009	Best Production, General Theatre	The Young Centre, Crow's Theatre	Nominated	
Dora Mavor Moore Awards	2009	Best Direction, General Theatre	Chris Abraham	Nominated	
Dora Mavor Moore Awards	2009	Best Costume Design, General Theatre	Julie Fox	Nominated	
Dora Mavor Moore Awards	2009	Best Set Design, General Theatre	Julie Fox	Nominated	
Dora Mavor Moore Awards	2009	Best Lighting Design, General Theatre	Jeff Logue	Nominated	
Gemini Awards	2005	Best Direction in a Dramatic Program or Mini-Series	Chris Abraham	Won	
Gemini Awards	2005	Best Performance by an Actress in a Leading Role in a Dramatic Program or Mini-Series	Kristen Thomson	Won	
