= Wajdi Mouawad =

Lebanese-Canadian actor, author and director (b. 1968)

- وجدي معوض
- Born: 16 October 1968 (age 57); Deir al-Qamar, Lebanon
- Occupations: Actor, playwright, writer, director, screenwriter, guitarist, drummer, director
- Writing career
- Notable awards: Knight of the Ordre des Arts et des Lettres Officer of the Order of Canada Governor General's Literary Award (2000) Grand Prize for Theater (French Academy) (2009) Knight of the National Order of Quebec (2010)
- Website: www.wajdimouawad.fr

Wajdi Mouawad, OC, (Arabic: وجدي معوض; born 1968) is a Lebanese-Canadian writer, actor, and director. He is known in Canadian and French theatre for politically engaged works such as the acclaimed play Incendies (2003). His works often revolve around family trauma, war, and the betrayal of youth. Since April 2016, Mouawad has been the director of the Théâtre national de la Colline in Paris.

== Early life and education ==
Born in Lebanon, Mouawad's family left the country when he was eight due to the outbreak of the Lebanese Civil War. He moved to Montreal in 1983 after living in France for five years. He obtained his diploma in interprétation (acting) from the National Theatre School of Canada in 1991.

== Career ==
In 1998, his creation Willy Protagoras enfermé dans les toilettes (Willy Protagoras locked up in the toilets) was voted best Montreal-based production by l'Association québécoise des critiques de théâtre.

From 2000 to 2004, he led the Théâtre de Quat'sous in Montreal.

In 2004, he directed and produced his first film, Littoral, based on the play of the same name.

In September 2007, he became the artistic director of the National Arts Centre's French Theatre in Ottawa, Ontario, Canada.

In early 2011, Mouawad cast French rock musician Bertrand Cantat in Chœurs, his production of a trilogy of Greek plays by Sophocles. This sparked widespread public criticism in Canada, as Cantat had recently been released after serving four years for the murder of his girlfriend, French actress Marie Trintignant. Canadian politicians suggested barring Cantat's entry into the country, as he failed to meet legal requirements for the entry of former convicts. In April 2011 the artistic director of Théâtre du Nouveau Monde, Lorraine Pintal, announced that Cantat would not be performing in Chœurs in Canada, though he did tour with the production in France, Belgium and Switzerland. Mouawad responded to the controversy by publishing an open letter to his three-year-old daughter Aimee in the newspaper Le Devoir, arguing for Cantat's right to complete reintegration into society.

Since April 2016, Mouawad has been the director of the Théâtre national de la Colline in Paris.

== Work ==
His play Incendies (Scorched) has been produced all over the world, including the United States, Brazil, Austria, Germany, Mexico, Spain and Australia, and the 2007 production at the Tarragon Theatre in Toronto won several awards. The Vienna Burgtheater assigned Stefan Bachmann with the stage production. It subsequently received much praise from critics, winning the "Nestroy Award" in 2007. In 2011 Incendies, the film version of the play directed by Denis Villeneuve was Canada's official selection for the Academy Awards.

=== Playwright ===
Published

- 1996: Alphonse (Leméac)
- 1999: Les mains d'Edwige au moment de la naissance (Leméac)
- 1999, 2009: Littoral (coedition Leméac/Actes Sud-Papiers)
- 2000: Pacamambo (Actes Sud-Papiers Junior)
- 2002: Rêves (coedition Leméac/Actes Sud-Papiers)
- 2003: Incendies; English translation: Scorched (2009)
- 2004: Willy Protagoras enfermé dans les toilettes (Leméac)
- 2006: Forêts; English translation: Forests (2010)
- 2007: Assoiffés (coédition Leméac/Actes Sud-Papiers)
- 2008: Le soleil ni la mort ne peuvent se regarder en face (coedition Leméac/Actes Sud)
- 2008: Seuls – Chemin, texte et peintures (Actes Sud – Leméac)
- 2009: Ciels; English translation: Heavens (2014)
- 2011: Journée de noces chez les Cromagnons (coedition Leméac/Actes Sud-Papiers)
- 2015: Sœurs
- 2017: Victoires
- 2018: L'œil
- 2018: Tous des oiseaux; English translation: Birds of a kind (2019)
- 2019: Alphonse ou Les aventures extraordinaires de Pierre-Paul-René, un enfant doux, monocorde et qui ne s'étonne jamais de rien

Not published

- 1992: Partie de cache-cache entre 2 tchécoslovaques au début du siècle

=== Radio works ===
- Loin des chaises
- Wilfrid
- William M.
- Le chevalier
- Dans la cathédrale
- Les trains hurlent quand on tue
- Les étrangers du bord du monde

=== Novels ===
- 2002: Visage retrouvé (coedition Leméac/Actes Sud)
- 2007: Un obus dans le cœur (Actes Sud Junior – Léméac)
- 2012: Anima

=== Films ===
- 2004: Tideline (Littoral) directed by Wajdi Mouawad
- 2010: Incendies directed by Denis Villeneuve

=== Theatre directing ===
(authors in parentheses, unless authored by Wajdi Moawad)

- 1992: Al Malja et L'Exil (Naji Mouawad)
- 1992: Macbeth (Shakespeare)
- 1994: Le tour du monde of Joe Maquillon (Gislain Bouchard)
- 1995: Tu ne violeras pas (Edna Mazia)
- 1995: Don Quichotte (Miguel de Cervantes)
- 1997: Littoral
- 1998: Willy Protagoras enfermé dans les toilettes
- 1998: Trainspotting (Irvine Welsh)
- 1998: Œdipe roi, in English Oedipus Rex (Sophocles)
- 1999: Disco Pigs (Enda Walsh)
- 1999: Les Troyennes, in English The Trojan Women (Euripides)
- 1999: Littoral – Festival d'Avignon
- 2000: Rêves
- 2000: Ce n'est pas la manière dont on se l'imagine que Claude et Jacqueline se sont rencontrés (Mouawad co-authoring with Estelle Clareton)
- 2000: Lulu le chant souterrain (Frank Wedekind)
- 2000: Reading Hebron (Jason Sherman)
- 2001: Le mouton et la baleine (Ahmed Ghazali)
- 2001: Six personnages en quête d'auteur in English Six Characters in Search of an Author (Luigi Pirandello)
- 2001: Manuscrit retrouvé à Saragosse (opera, Alexis Nouss)
- 2002: Les Trois Sœurs in English Three Sisters (Anton Chekhov)
- 2003: Incendies
- 2005: Ma mère chien (Louise Bombardier)
- 2006: Forêts
- 2007: Incendies in Russian, at Théâtre Et Cetera Moscou)
- 2008: Seuls at Festival d'Avignon
- 2009: Littoral, Incendies, Forêts (trilogy) at Festival d'Avignon
- 2009: Ciels at Festival d'Avignon
- 2010: Ciels at Odéon-Théâtre de l'Europe Ateliers Berthier
- 2010: Littoral / Incendies / Forêts (trilogy) at Théâtre national de Chaillot
- 2010: Seuls at Festival d'Avignon
- 2011: Seuls at Le Quartz
- 2011: Temps at Théâtre d'Aujourd'hui
- 2011: Le Cycle des Femmes: trois histoires de Sophocle at Festival d'Avignon (music by Bertrand Cantat and Pascal Humbert)

=== Adaptations ===
He has adapted different works for the theatre, from Don Quixote to Trainspotting.

- 2010: Un tramway d'après adaptation of A Streetcar Named Desire of Tennessee Williams (directed by Krzysztof Warlikowski, Théâtre de l'Odéon)

=== Interpretations ===
- 2009: Seuls texte (directing and interpreting, Festival d'Avignon)
- 2010: Les Justes of Albert Camus (directed by Stanislas Nordey, Théâtre national de Bretagne, Théâtre national de la Colline, Théâtre des Treize Vents, Théâtre National Populaire -Villeurbanne)

=== Others ===
- 2004: Je suis le méchant!, interviews with André Brassard (Leméac)
- 2004: Littoral, cinematic projection of the theater work of the same name TVA Films
- 2005: Architecture d'un marcheur, interviews given to Jean-François Côté (Leméac)
- 2009: Le Sang des Promesses: Puzzle, racines, et rhizomes, travel notes, directing, regarding the process of writing and directing of the de la tetralogy (Léméac/Actes Sud)
- 2011: Traduire Sophocle (Actes Sud)

== Awards and distinctions ==
- 1998: Prize of best production in Montréal, awarded by "Association québécoise des critiques de théâtre" for Willy Protagoras enfermé dans les toilettes
- 2000: Literary prize of the Governor General of Canada in the Theater category for Littoral
- 2002: Chevalier (knight) of the Ordre des Arts et des Lettres awarded by France for the collection of his works.
- 2004: Prix Jacqueline-Déry-Mochon
- 2004: Prize "SACD de la francophonie" for totality of his works
- 2005: Molière of best francophone author (he refused to receive the Molières 2005 prize)
- 2009: Officer Order of Canada "for his contributions as a writer, actor, stage director and playwright known internationally for the quality and scope of his theatrical creations".
- 2009: Grand prix du théâtre de l'Académie française
- 2013: Phoenix Award for his novel Anima (as part of the Beirut Spring Festival organized by the Samir Kassir Foundation)
- 2013: Grand Prix Thyde Monnier for Anima
- 2013: Deuxième Roman de Laval prize for Anima
- 2013: Prix Méditerranée for Anima
- 2014: Premi Llibreter de Narrativa for Anima

== Sources ==
- Charlotte Farcet, Les Tigres de Wajdi Mouawad (Joca Seria, 2009)
