= Richard Rose (director) =

Canadian theatre director

Richard Rose CM (born January 18, 1955) is a Canadian theatre director, most noted as the former artistic director of the Toronto theatre companies Necessary Angel and Tarragon Theatre.

== Background ==
He was born in Maracaibo, Venezuela, and raised in Sudbury, Ontario. He studied theatre at York University.

== Career ==
He was the founding artistic director of Necessary Angel in 1978. The company's first production, Aeschylus's Oresteia, was not well-regarded by critics but telegraphed the company's high ambitions.

Necessary Angel rose to critical and popular favour with the breakout success of John Krizanc's play Tamara in 1981, which won numerous Dora Mavor Moore Awards in 1982 including Best Director for Rose. Following the success of Tamara, he collaborated with Thom Sokoloski, the artistic director of Theatre Autumn Leaf, to create Autumn Angel Repertory, who won the Dora for Outstanding New Play in 1984 for Mein.

In 1989 he attracted acclaim for his theatrical adaptation of Michael Ondaatje's novel Coming Through Slaughter, cowritten with Ondaatje and D.D. Kugler. In 1992, Rose and Kugler debuted another stage adaptation, of Timothy Findley's novel Not Wanted on the Voyage.

He also directed the short film Giant Steps, which screened at the 1992 Toronto International Film Festival, and served for three years as director of the youth company at the Stratford Festival.

In 2002 he was appointed artistic director of Tarragon. His role with the company was marked by brief controversy in 2012 when Michael Healey resigned as the company's playwright in residence after Rose declined to produce his play Proud, but Rose remained with the company until his retirement in 2020.

In 2024, he was appointed as a member of the Order of Canada. He lives in Toronto.

== Awards ==
Award	Year	Category	Work	Result	Ref(s)
Dora Mavor Moore Awards	1982	Outstanding Direction of a Play, General Theatre	Tamara	Won	
Dora Mavor Moore Awards	1983	Best Original Play, General Theatre	Censored	Nominated	
Dora Mavor Moore Awards	1984	Best Original Play, General Theatre	Mein with Stewart Arnott, Ines Ruchli, Mark Christmann, Dorian Clark, Denis Forest, Maggie Huculak, Tanja Jacobs, Susan McKenzie	Won	
Dora Mavor Moore Awards	1989	Outstanding Direction of a Play, General Theatre	The Possibilities	Nominated	
Dora Mavor Moore Awards	1990	Best Original Play, General Theatre	Coming Through Slaughter with Michael Ondaatje, D.D. Kugler	Nominated	
Dora Mavor Moore Awards	1990	Outstanding Direction of a Play, General Theatre	The Europeans	Nominated	
Dora Mavor Moore Awards	1993	Outstanding Direction of a Play, Midsize Theatre	Glenn	Nominated	
Dora Mavor Moore Awards	1996	Outstanding Direction of a Play, Midsize Theatre	Seven Lears	Won	
Dora Mavor Moore Awards	1998	Outstanding Direction of a Play, General Theatre	Inexpressible Island	Nominated	
Dora Mavor Moore Awards	2004	Outstanding Direction of a Play, General Theatre	Remnants	Won	
Dora Mavor Moore Awards	2004	Outstanding Direction of a Play, General Theatre	Simpl	Nominated	
Dora Mavor Moore Awards	2006	Outstanding Direction of a Play, General Theatre	Léo	Nominated	
Dora Mavor Moore Awards	2007	Outstanding Direction of a Play, General Theatre	Scorched	Won	
Dora Mavor Moore Awards	2010	Outstanding Direction of a Play, General Theatre	Courageous	Nominated	
Dora Mavor Moore Awards	2014	Outstanding Direction of a Play, General Theatre	A God in Need of Help	Nominated	
Dora Mavor Moore Awards	2015	Outstanding Direction of a Play, General Theatre	An Enemy of the People	Nominated	
Dora Mavor Moore Awards	2018	Outstanding Direction of a Play, General Theatre	Hamlet	Nominated	
