= Dora Mavor Moore Award for Best Leading Actor (General Theatre) =

The Dora Mavor Moore Award for Outstanding Performance by a Male in a Principal Role - Play is an annual award celebrating achievements in live Canadian theatre.

The award was discontinued after 2018, and merged with the award for Best Leading Actress (General Theatre) into a single gender-neutral award for Best Leading Performer (General Theatre).

== Awards and nominations ==
Year	Winner	Nominated
1981	Brent Carver, Bent	Donald Davis, ECU; Donald Davis, On Golden Pond; Hardee T. Lineham, The Crackwalker
1982	John Evans, True West	Geordie Johnson, Lone Star; Douglas Rain, Bodies; Larry Reynolds, Rexy!
1983	R. H. Thomson, Hand to Hand	Douglas Rain, Master Builder; Hugh Webster, The Kite; Paul Latrelle, Un pays dont la devise est je m'oublie
1984	Douglas Rain, The Dining Room	Douglas Campbell, Homecoming; Gordon Clapp, Trafford Tanzi; Richard Hilger, Three Beats to the Bar; Dan Lett, Delicatessen; R.H. Thomson, The Jail Diary of Albee Sachs
1985	Heath Lamberts, Cyrano de Bergerac	Peter Blais, Criminals in Love; Paul Gross, Romeo and Juliet; David Hemblen, Uncle Vanya; Errol Slue, "Master Harold"...and the Boys
1986	Stephen Ouimette, Danny and the Deep Blue Sea	Eric Peterson, The Double Bass; R.H. Thomson, Hamlet; Brian Torpe, As Is; Jean-Guy Viau, Hosanna
1987	Stephen Ouimette, B-Movie: The Play	Graham Bailey, Master Class; Stuart Hughes, Romeo and Juliet; Errol Slue, Blood Knot; Tom Wood, The Forest
1988	Geordie Johnson, I Am Yours	Roland Hewgill, Play Memory; Stuart Hughes, Unexpected Moves; Michael Riley, Nothing Sacred; Angelo Rizacos, Detaining Mr. Trotsky
1989	Graham Greene, Dry Lips Oughta Move to Kapuskasing	Robert Bellefeuille, The Dragons Trilogy; David Clark, Under the Skin; Gary Farmer, Dry Lips Oughta Move to Kapuskasing; Errol Slue, Driving Miss Daisy
1990	Stuart Hughes, The Collected Works of Billy the Kid	Diego Matamoros, Potestad; Leon Pownall, The Father; Michael Riley, The Comedy of Errors; Guillermo Verdecchia, Amigo's Blue Guitar
1991	Jim Mezon, Burn This	Henry Czerny, The Arab's Mouth; Randy Hughson, The Crackwalker; Tom McCamus, 7 Stories; Robert Morgan, The Anger in Ernest and Ernestine
1992	Rod Beattie, The Wingfield Trilogy	David Fox, Democracy; Allan Gray, Whale Riding Weather; Andrew Scorer, The Seaford Tapes; Michael Simpson, Three Sisters
1993	Hardee T. Lineham, Richard III	Patrick Galligan, Crimes of the Heart; David Qamaniq, Whale; Cliff Saunders, Pinocchio; Jim Warren, A Midsummer Night's Dream
1994	Tom McCamus, Abundance	Alex Fallis, Twelfth Night; Patrick Galligan, Holiday; John Gilbert, A Christmas Carol; Tom Wood, Homeward Bound
1995	Nigel Shawn Williams, Six Degrees of Separation	Mark Burgess, Molly Wood; Ben Carlson, Hay Fever; George Dawson, Molly Wood; Richard Partington, Molly Wood
1996	Heath Lamberts, One for the Pot	Simon Bradbury, One for the Pot; Patrick Goyette, The Seven Streams of the River Ota; Christopher Hunt, Two Weeks with the Queen; Julian Richings, Two Weeks with the Queen
1997	John Dolan, Oliver Twist	Jonathan Crombie, Arcadia; David Fox, Oliver Twist; Judd Hirsch, Death of a Salesman; Simon McBurney, The Three Lives of Lucie Cabrol; David Storch, The Glass Menagerie
1998	Eric Peterson, The Designated Mourner	Peter Hutt, Patience; Ross Manson, Cherry Docs; Richard McMillan, Inexpressible Island; John Neville, Molly Sweeney; Shaun Smyth, Trainspotting
1999	David Fox, The Drawer Boy	Paul Braunstein, Kilt; Peter Donat, Don Carlos; Jim Mezon, How I Learned to Drive; Eric Peterson, Billy Bishop Goes to War
2000	Diego Matamoros, Endgame	Oliver Becker, The Beauty Queen of Leenane; Ronnie Burkett, Street of Blood; Diego Matamoros, The Play's the Thing; Donald Sutherland, Enigma Variations
2001	Conleth Hill, Stones in His Pockets	Ronnie Burkett, Happy; Sean Campion, Stones in His Pockets; Randy Hughson, Earshot; Luke Kirby, Geometry in Venice; Joseph Ziegler, The School for Wives
2002	Tony Nardi, The Lesson	Oliver Dennis, Gynty; Peter Donaldson, Plan B; John Kani, The Island; Diego Matamoros, Uncle Vanya; Alon Nashman, Picasso at the Lapin Agile
2003	Richard McMillan, Through the Eyes	Ari Cohen, Sunday Father; Ted Dykstra, A Chorus of Disapproval; John Jarvis, The Girl in the Goldfish Bowl; Stephen Ouimette, The Beard of Avon
2004	William Hutt, No Man's Land	David Ferry, Hockey Mom, Hockey Dad; Jim Mezon, Copenhagen; Dennis O'Connor, Le Visiteur; Rick Roberts, Hotel Loopy
2005	Rick Miller, Bigger Than Jesus	Stuart Hughes, The Dumb Waiter / The Zoo Story; Daniel MacIvor, Cul-de-sac; Eric Peterson, Half Life; Paul Soles, Trying
2006	Shawn Doyle, A Number	Ronnie Burkett, 10 Days on Earth; Sergio Di Zio, Léo; Jeff Lillico, Our Town; Tom McCamus, Mathilde; Albert Schultz, Our Town
2007	Daniel MacIvor, Here Lies Henry	Tom McCamus, Thom Pain (based on nothing); Rick Roberts, John and Beatrice; Kenneth Welsh, Leaving Home; Ashley Wright, Of Mice and Men
2008	Joseph Ziegler, The Time of Your Life	Brent Carver, The Elephant Man; Brian Dooley, The December Man; John Jarvis, The Drawer Boy; Julian Richings, The Palace of the End
2009	Waawaate Fobister, Agokwe	Hrant Alianak, House of Many Tongues; Kevin Hanchard, Miss Julie: Freedom Summer; Diego Matamoros, Travesties; Philip Riccio, Festen
2010	Diego Matamoros, Who's Afraid of Virginia Woolf?	Oliver Dennis, Parfumerie; Paul Sun Hyung Lee, The Monster Under the Bed; Eric Peterson, Billy Bishop Goes to War; Pierre Simpson, Les Médecins de Molière
2011	Joseph Ziegler, Death of a Salesman	David Ferry, Blasted; Sterling Jarvis, Ruined; Ash Knight, Brothel #9; Diego Matamoros, Oleanna
2012	Nigel Shawn Williams, Topdog/Underdog	Kevin Hanchard, Topdog/Underdog; Michael Healey, Clybourne Park; Paul Sun Hyung Lee, Kim's Convenience; Jim Mezon, RED
2013	Tom Rooney, Someone Else	Michael Dufays, Arigato, Tokyo; Sterling Jarvis, The Whipping Man; Tawiah M'carthy, Obaaberima; Nigel Shawn Williams, Race
2014	Bruce Dow, Pig	Damien Atkins, Angels in America: Perestroika; Oliver Dennis, The Norman Conquests; Brendan Gall, Lungs; Gregory Prest, Of Human Bondage
2015	Kawa Ada, Accidental Death of an Anarchist	Joe Cobden, An Enemy of the People; Kevin Hanchard, The Mountaintop; Jeff Irving, Tom at the Farm; Jeff Lillico, Tom at the Farm
2016	Anand Rajaram, Mustard	Greg Gale, The Crackwalker; Danny Ghantous, A Line in the Sand; Sina Gilani, The 20th of November; R. H. Thomson, You Will Remember Me
2017	André Sills, "Master Harold"...and the Boys	James Daly, "Master Harold"...and the Boys; Daren Herbert, Father Comes Home From the Wars (Parts I, II, III); Sugith Varughese, Little Pretty and the Exceptional; Joseph Ziegler, The Last Wife
2018	Kim Coates, Jerusalem	Richard Clarkin, Confederation & Riel; Oliver Dennis, A Delicate Balance; David Storch, The Boy in the Moon; Richard Zeppieri, Bang Bang
