= Incendies (play) =

Play by Wajdi Mouawad

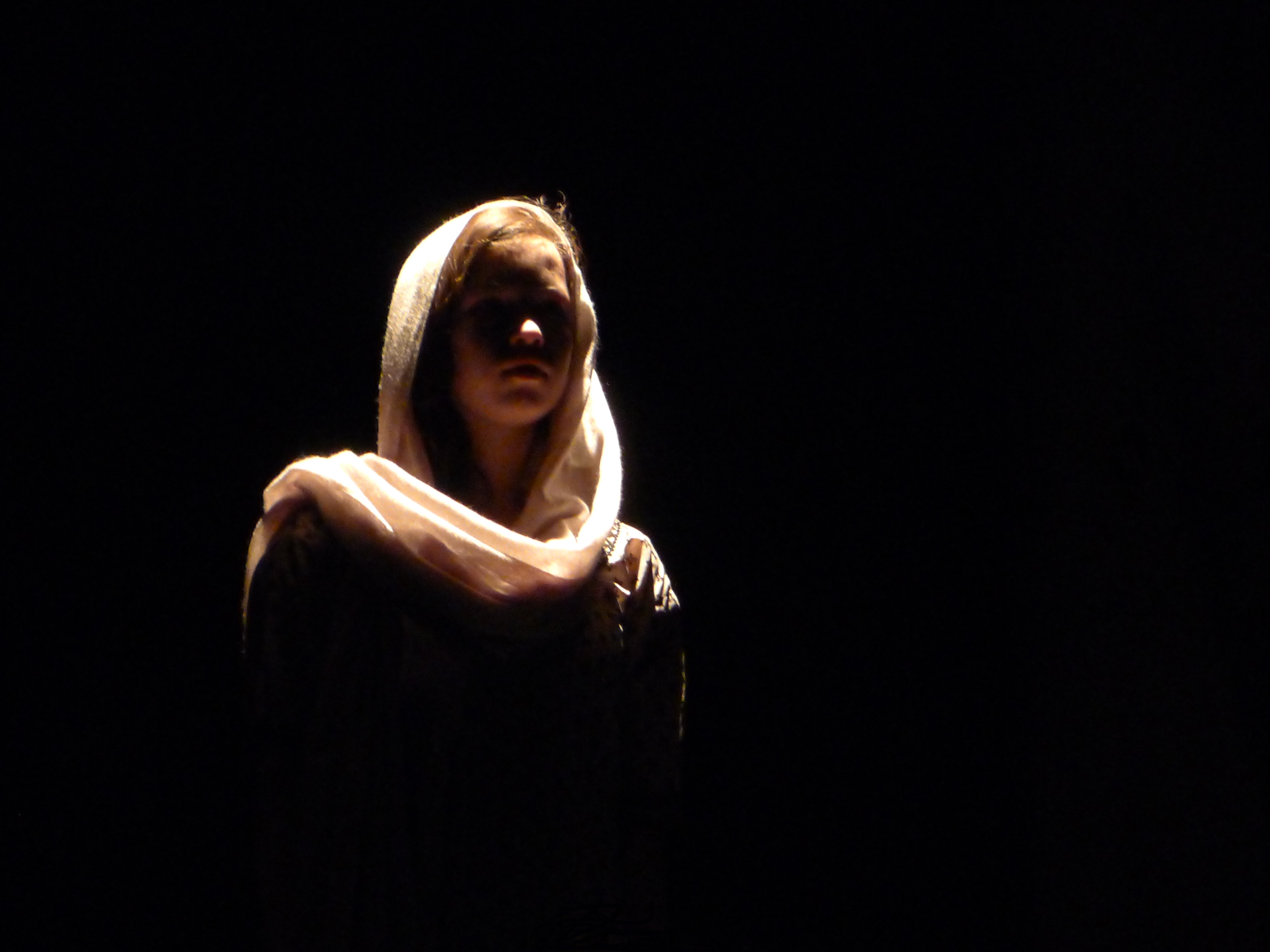
- Nawal's mother in a 2012 performance at the Lise-Guèvremont theatre, Montreal
- Original language: French
- Written by: Wajdi Mouawad
- Characters: Simon Marwan; Jeanne Marwan; Nawal Marwan
- Genre: Tragedy

Premiere
- Date: 2003

Incendies is a 2003 play by Wajdi Mouawad. The play was translated into English as Scorched by Linda Gaboriau and was published in 2005 by Playwrights Canada Press.

The play was based on parts of the life of the Lebanese communist militant Souha Bechara. Charlotte Facet notes that Mouawad met with Bechara before writing the play, but adds that some of the material is adapted from Randa Chahal Sabag's film work on and with Bechara, while noting that many of the characteristics of Bechara are divided among the main characters including Jeanne and Simon, rather than Nawal alone.

It was the second part of a thematically-related, but not strictly sequential, trilogy of plays about characters of Middle Eastern origins confronting family secrets, preceded by Tideline (Littoral) and followed by Forests (Forêts).

== Plot ==
Incendies follows the journey of twins Jeanne (Janine in the English translation) and Simon, as they attempt to unravel the mystery of their mother's life. When Jeanne and Simon Marwan lose their mother, Nawal, they are instead left with a difficult mission that sends them on a journey to the Middle East in pursuit of their tangled roots and a long-lost brother.

== Awards ==
The 2007 production at the Tarragon Theatre in Toronto won two Dora Mavor Moore Awards, including Best Play and Best Director (for Richard Rose). The production has been remounted several times and went on a cross-Canada tour in 2008–2009.

== Film version ==
Incendies was adapted into a 2010 film of the same title by Denis Villeneuve. It stars Mélissa Désormeaux-Poulin, Maxim Gaudette, and Lubna Azabal. It was nominated for the 2011 Academy Award in the Best Foreign Language Film category, and won the Genie Award for Best Motion Picture at the 31st Genie Awards.

== Other productions ==
A 2024 production for Montreal's Théâtre Duceppe starred Neil Elias and Sabrina Bégin Tejada as Simon and Jeanne.
