= Nigel Shawn Williams =

Canadian actor

- Born: Jamaica
- Occupations: film, television and stage actor, theatre director
- Known for: former co-artistic director of Factory Theatre

Nigel Shawn Williams is a Canadian actor and theatre director from Toronto, Ontario.

Williams was born in Jamaica and moved to Canada with his family in childhood. A 1990 graduate of the University of Windsor, his early stage roles included Thomas Coyle's The Tyrant of Pontus, Suzan-Lori Parks' Imperceptible Mutabilities in the Third Kingdom, Robert E. Sherwood's The Petrified Forest and George Bernard Shaw's The Six of Calais.

== Career ==
Williams won the Dora Mavor Moore Award for Outstanding Performance by a Male in a Principal Role – Play in 1995 for his performance as Paul in John Guare's Six Degrees of Separation.

He won a second Dora as an actor in 2012 for his performance as Lincoln in Obsidian Theatre's production of Suzan-Lori Parks' Topdog/Underdog, and was a nominee in 2013 for his performance as Henry in Canadian Stage's production of David Mamet's Race. As a director, he won the Dora Mavor Moore Award for Outstanding Direction of a Play/Musical in 2006 for his direction of Colleen Wagner's The Monument, and was nominated in 2011 for his direction of Anusree Roy's Brothel #9.

His film and television credits include the television series The City, The Famous Jett Jackson, The Jane Show, XIII: The Conspiracy and The Listener, and the films Phantom Punch, Down in the Delta, Vendetta, Jett Jackson: The Movie, John Q and Brown Girl Begins.

== Filmography ==
=== Film ===
Year	Title	Role	Notes
2000	Tribulation	Victor	
2002	John Q.	News Anchor	
2008	Phantom Punch	Toby Liston	
2017	Brown Girl Begins	Papa Legba / Jab-Jab / Brukfoot Sam	
2020	Two Deaths of Henry Baker	Carlos	
2026	Psycho Killer	Jane's Father	

=== Television ===
Year	Title	Role	Notes
1993	E.N.G.	Candidate	Episode: "Full Disclosure"
1995	Forever Knight	Harry	Episode: "Partners of the Month"
1997	F/X: The Series	Stickman	Episode: "High Roller"
1998–2001	The Famous Jett Jackson	Artemus / Nigel Essex	3 episodes
1999	Vendetta	Samuel Foster	Television film
1999	At the Mercy of a Stranger	Ben Prentiss	Television film
1999	The City	Detective White	4 episodes
2000	The Wonderful World of Disney	Merle Brady	Episode: "The Loretta Claiborne Story"
2000	Deliberate Intent	Judge Williams	Television film
2001	Jett Jackson: The Movie	Artemus / Nigel Essex	Television film
2002	Odyssey 5	Dr. Alex Stratton	Episode: "Dark at the End of the Tunnel"
2006–2007	The Jane Show	Desmond	14 episodes
2008	XIII: The Conspiracy	Ellery Shipley	2 episodes
2010	Unnatural History	Dr. Charles Wincott	Episode: "The Griffin Gang"
2011	The Listener	Wes Everdon	Episode: "Desperate Hours"
2014	A Day Late and a Dollar Short	George	Television film
2014	Saving Hope	Malcolm Eldente	Episode: "The Way We Were"
2015	Heroes Reborn	Dr. Don Mercer	Episode: "The Lion's Den"
2017	Suits	Judge Ward	2 episodes
2021	Death She Wrote	Mr. Tollson	Television film
2024	Murdoch Mysteries	Conrad Peach	Episode: "Spirits in the Night"
2024	Law & Order Toronto: Criminal Intent	Erin Green	Episode: "Good Neighbours"
2025	Devil in Disguise: John Wayne Gacy	John Davis	Episode: "Billy"
