= Denise Clarke =

Canadian dancer

Denise Clarke is a Canadian dancer and choreographer. Born in Alberta, she became a member of the Order of Canada in 2013. She works as an Associate Artist with One Yellow Rabbit Performance Theater.

== Career ==
Denise Clarke started ballet when she was three years old. She worked as a choreographer and dance teacher.

She began working on "Collective Creations" together with One Yellow Rabbit in 1983.

In 1986, Clarke joined the One Yellow Rabbit Theatre Ensemble and developed its "signature physical style". Clarke was the Director of the One Yellow Rabbit Summer Lab Intensive from 1997 to 2019. She collaborated with OYR to create shows including Breeder, So Low, Permission, Featherland, Sign Language, Heavens to Murgatroid, A Fabulous Disaster, Smash Cut Freeze, Wag, and Room 333.

In 2014, she performed Wag, her autobiographical dance work at the Magnetic North Theater Festival in Halifax.

In 2018, she published The Big Secret Book: An Intense Guide for Creating Performance Theater.

== Achievements ==
Denise holds an honorary doctorate from the University of Calgary, and was appointed Member of the Order of Canada in 2013.
