= Urjo Kareda =

Canadian music critic (1944–2001)

- Born: February 9, 1944; Tallinn, Estonia
- Died: December 26, 2001 (aged 57); Toronto, Ontario, Canada
- Occupations: Theatre critic, stage director

Urjo Kareda (February 9, 1944 – December 26, 2001) was an Estonian-born Canadian theatre and music critic, dramaturge and stage director.

Kareda was born in Tallinn, Estonia. His parents fled the Soviet occupation of Estonia in the autumn of 1944, escaping first to Sweden, where Kareda attended schools. At age five, the family moved to Toronto, where his father, journalist Endel Kareda, helped to establish Meie Elu (Our Life), an Estonian weekly newspaper for the Estonian diaspora in Canada.

After working as a theatre critic for the Toronto Star in the early 1970s, Kareda was Literary Manager at the Stratford Festival during the tenure of Artistic Director Robin Phillips. He and a team of three other directors (Martha Henry, Pam Brighton, and Peter Moss) were hired to lead Stratford's 1981 season after Phillips' resignation, but the subsequent dismissal of the team a few months later caused several Stratford veterans to decide to work away from the Festival for some years.

He was artistic director of the Tarragon Theatre of Toronto from 1982 until his death on December 26, 2001, of cancer. Kareda also wrote for several publications and was an arts commentator for the CBC. He served for many years as the Toronto correspondent for Opera News magazine.

== Honours ==
His honours included the Order of Canada (1995); the City of Toronto Award for the Performing Arts (1999); and the Chalmers Award for Artistic Direction (2000). He was also the recipient of a special honorary Dora Mavor Moore Award.
