= Christine Quintana =

Canadian actor, playwright and theatre director

- Occupations: Actor; playwright; theatre director

Christine Quintana is a Canadian actor, playwright and theatre director from Vancouver, British Columbia, whose play Selfie was a nominee for the Governor General's Award for English-language drama at the 2021 Governor General's Awards.

Selfie premiered on stage in 2018, before being published by Playwrights Canada Press in 2020.

Quintana was the recipient of the Siminovitch Prize in Theatre's Protégé Award in 2017.
