= Mitchell Cushman =

Canadian theatre director

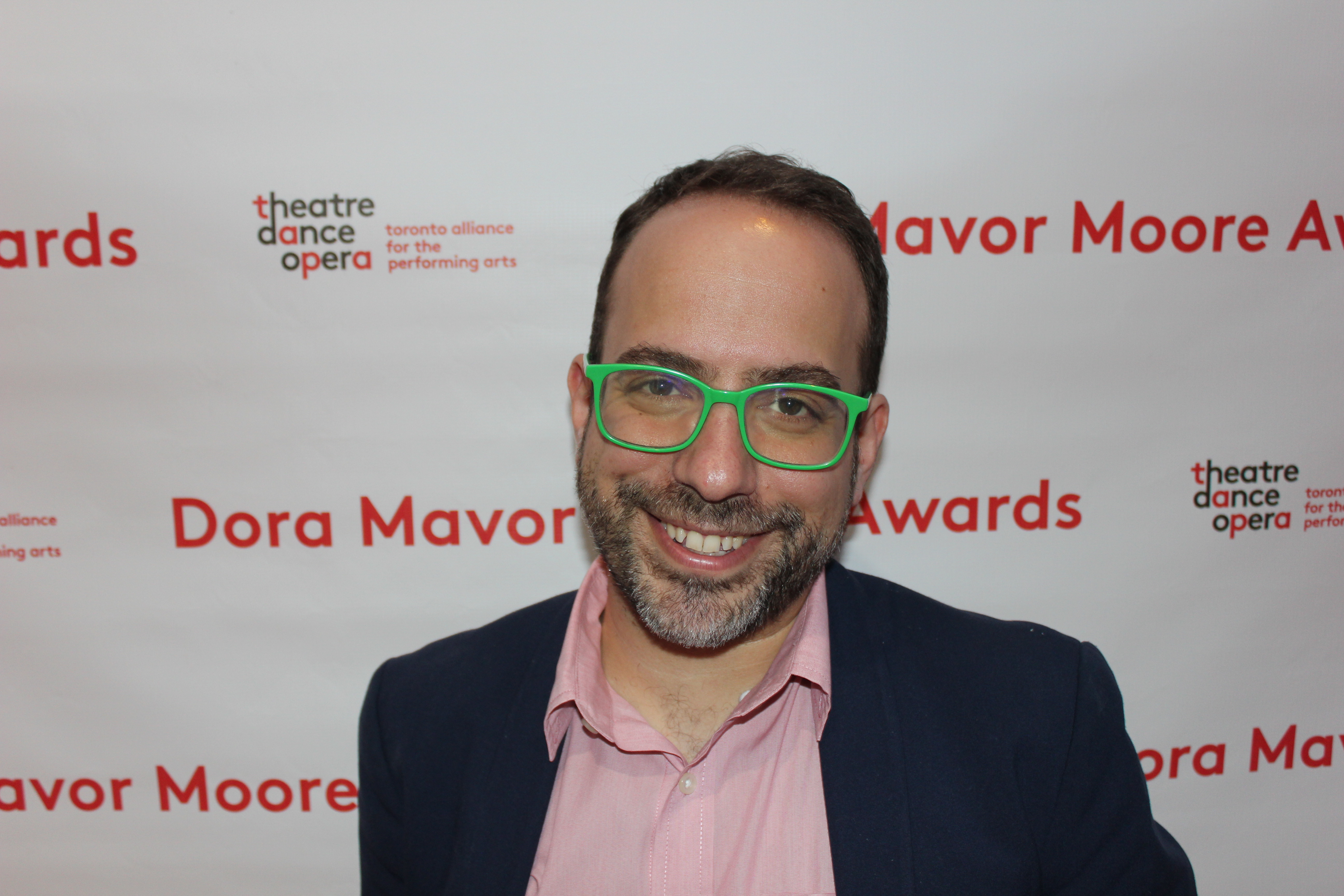
Cushman at the 2026 Dora Mavor Moore Awards in Toronto, Canada

Mitchell Cushman is the founding and current artistic director of Toronto's site-specific theatre company Outside the March. He has received the Siminovitch Prize protégé award, four Dora Mavor Moore awards, and fourteen Toronto Theatre Critics Awards.

With Outside the March, Cushman has directed over twenty productions including: Jerusalem starring Kim Coates, Mr. Marmalade, and Haley McGee's The Ex-boyfriend Yard Sale. Other directing credits include work at the Stratford Festival, Talk is Free Theatre, and the National Arts Centre.

== Personal life ==
Cushman is the son of former National Post theatre critic, Robert Cushman. He is also a triplet.
