= Daniel MacIvor =

Canadian actor and director

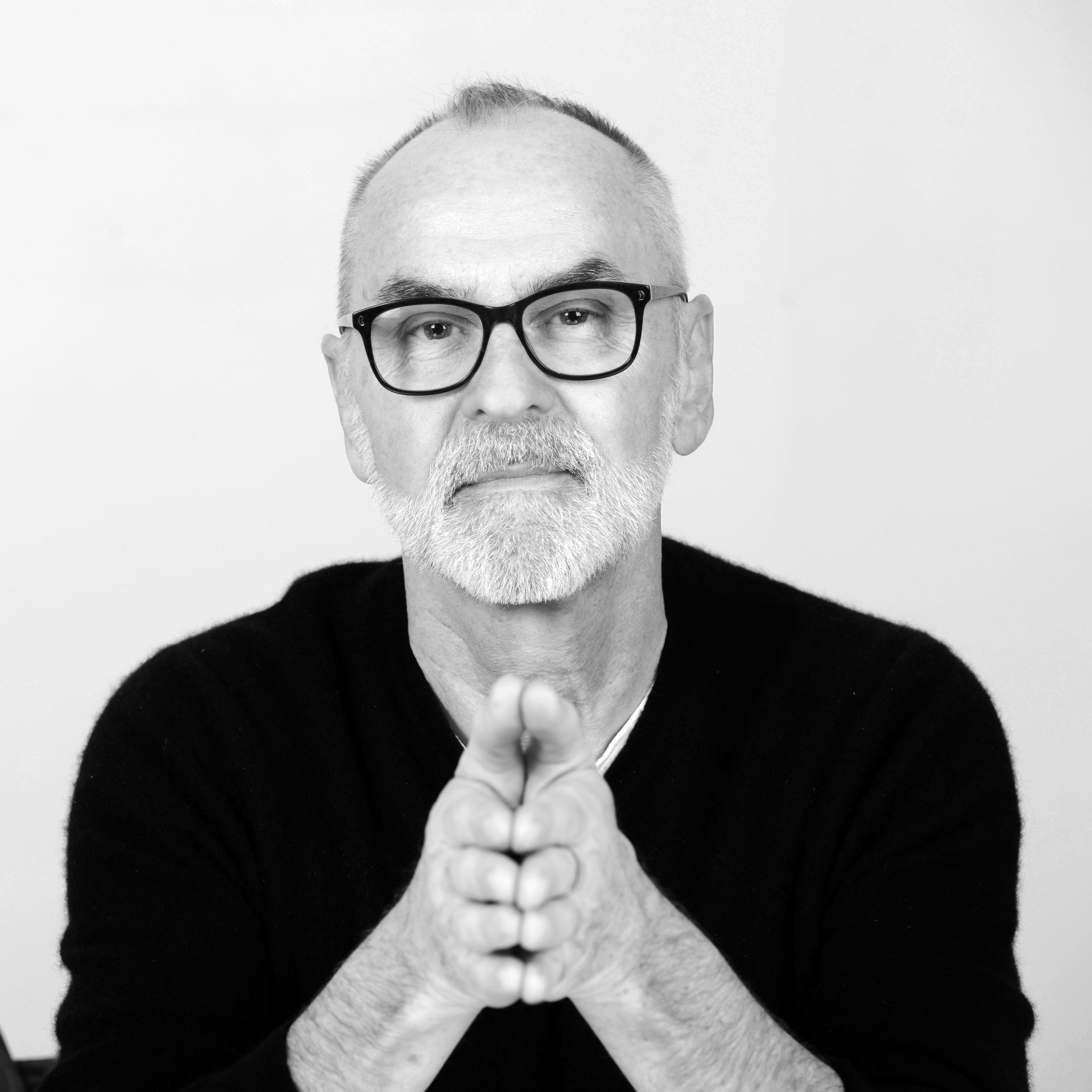
- MacIvor in 2021
- Born: July 23, 1962 (age 64); Sydney, Nova Scotia, Canada
- Occupations: Actor, playwright, director
- Spouse: Paul Goulet (2006–2009)

Daniel MacIvor (born July 23, 1962) is a Canadian actor, playwright, theatre director, and film director. He is best known for his acting roles in independent films and the sitcom Twitch City.

== Personal life ==
MacIvor was born in Sydney, Nova Scotia, and educated at Dalhousie University in Halifax and then at George Brown College in Toronto.

MacIvor is openly gay. He married Paul Goulet in 2006; they have since divorced.

In 2021, MacIvor earned an MA in Drama, Theatre and Performance Studies from the University of Toronto.

== Career ==
=== Theatre ===
MacIvor founded the theatre company da da kamera with Michele Jelley in 1986 to independently produce their own work. He has been in residence at Buddies in Bad Times, for whom he has written, directed, and acted.

In 1992, 2-2 Tango was included in Making Out, the first anthology of Canadian plays by gay writers, alongside works by Ken Garnhum, Sky Gilbert, David Demchuk, Harry Rintoul, and Colin Thomas.

His plays include Never Swim Alone, This is a Play, Monster, Marion Bridge, You are Here, Cul-de-sac, and A Beautiful View. Five of MacIvor's plays (Never Swim Alone, The Soldier Dreams, You are Here, In on It, and A Beautiful View) were published as I Still Love You in 2006, in celebration of the twentieth anniversary of da da kamera, and won MacIvor a Governor General's Award for English-language drama.

MacIvor is particularly well-known for a series of solo shows created in collaboration with director Daniel Brooks. These include House, Here Lies Henry, Monster, and Cul-de-sac. These incorporate a minimalist and metatheatrical style. The first three of these pieces were staged at Buddies in Bad Times Theatre in the 2006/2007 season as part of a tribute and retrospective of da da kamera's work. In House and Here Lies Henry, MacIvor portrays one character who speaks directly to the audience, acknowledging their presence. The direct address of the audience continues in Monster and Cul-de-sac, occasionally broken up by dialogue between characters.

MacIvor and Brooks later collaborated with Iris Turcott to create the play Who Killed Spalding Gray?, in which MacIvor played a character partly based on actor Spalding Gray. The show premiered at the Halifax's Magnetic North Theatre Festival, and was later performed in Toronto at Luminato and in Calgary at the High Performance Rodeo.

=== Film ===
In his early film work, MacIvor frequently collaborated with director Laurie Lynd, including on the short films RSVP in 1991 and The Fairy Who Didn't Want to Be a Fairy Anymore in 1992, and on the feature film House (1995).

In the early 2000s MacIvor wrote, co-wrote, and directed several independent films, most of which were made in his home province of Nova Scotia. They include Past Perfect, Marion Bridge, Whole New Thing, and Wilby Wonderful.

As an actor he appeared in Cynthia Roberts's Bubbles Galore and Jeremy Podeswa's The Five Senses, had a recurring role in the television series Republic of Doyle, and played Nathan in the Canadian television series Twitch City. MacIvor worked with director Bruce McDonald as screenwriter of the films Trigger and Weirdos, for the latter of which MacIvor won a Canadian Screen Award for Best Screenplay in 2017.

=== Other ===
In addition to his film and theatrical credits, MacIvor wrote the libretto to the opera Hadrian, for which Rufus Wainwright wrote the music.

== Awards and honours ==
In addition to winning the Governor General's Award for English-language drama in 2006, MacIvor also has two Chalmers Canadian Play Awards, from 1997 and 1992.

In 1998, MacIvor won the award for overall excellence at the New York International Fringe Festival for his play Never Swim Alone.

In 2002, his play In On It earned him a GLAAD Media Award and an Obie Award.

In 2008, he was awarded the Siminovitch Prize in Theatre.

== Selected plays ==
- See Bob Run (1987), da da kamera and Buddies in Bad Times, directed by Ken McDougall
- Somewhere I Have Never Travelled (1988), Tarragon Theatre, directed by Andy McKim
- Yes I Am and Who Are You? (1989), Buddies in Bad Times, directed by Edward Roy
- Wild Abandon (1989), Theatre Passe Muraille, directed by Vinetta Strombergs
- Never Swim Alone (1991), da da kamera, directed by Ken McDougall
- 2-2 Tango (1991), Buddies in Bad Times, directed by Ken McDougall
- Jump (1992), Theatre Passe Muraille, directed by Daniel Brooks
- House (1992), da da kamera and the Factory Theatre
- This is a Play (1992), da da kamera and the Toronto Fringe Festival, directed by Ken MacDougall
- The Lorca Play (1992), da da kamera, directed by Daniel McIvor and Daniel Brooks
- Sessions (1995), Tarragon Theatre, directed by Daniel MacIvor, Daniel Brooks, and Clare Coulter
- Here Lies Henry (1995), Buddies in Bad Times, written with Daniel Brooks, directed by Daniel Brooks
- The Soldier Dreams (1997), da da kamera at Canadian Stage Company
- Marion Bridge (1998), Mulgrave Road Theatre and da da kamera
- Monster (1998), da da kamera at Canadian Stage Company, writtern with Daniel Brooks, directed by Daniel MacIvor and Daniel Brooks
- In On It (2000), Edinburgh Festival Fringe, directed by Daniel MacIvor
- You Are Here (2001), da da kamera and Theatre Passe Muraille, directed by Daniel MacIvor
- Cul-de-Sac (2003), da da kamera, directed by Daniel Brooks
- A Beautiful View (2006), da da kamera, directed by Daniel MacIvor
- How It Works (2007), Tarragon Theatre, directed by Daniel MacIvor
- His Greatness (2007), Vancouver Arts Club, directed by Linda Moore
- Confession (2008), Mulgrave Road Theatre, directed by Ann-Marie Kerr
- Communion (2010), Tarragon Theatre, directed by Daniel MacIvor
- This Is What Happens Next (2010), Canadian Stage Company, directed by Daniel Brooks
- Bingo! (2011), Mulgrave Road Theatre, directed by Daniel MacIvor
- Was Spring (2012), Tarragon Theatre, directed by Daniel MacIvor
- The Best Brothers (2012), Stratford Festival, directed by Dean Gabourie
- Arigato, Tokyo (2013), Buddies in Bad Times, directed by Brendan Healy
- Small Things (2014), Prairie Theatre Exchange, directed by Robert Metcalfe
- Who Killed Spalding Gray? (2014), Magnetic North Theatre Festival, directed by Daniel Brooks
- I, Animal (2015), Kazan Co-op, directed by Richie Wilcox
- Cake & Dirt (2015), Tarragon Theatre, directed by Amiel Gladstone
- Let's Run Away (2019), Canadian Stage Company, directed by Daniel Brooks
- New Magic Valley Fun Town (2019), Tarragon Theatre, directed by Richard Rose
