= Derek Goldby =

Australian theatre director (1940–2022)

- Born: 1940; Adelaide, South Australia
- Died: 9 January 2022 (aged 81)
- Education: Dulwich College; Caius College
- Occupation: Theatre director

Derek Tomlin Goldby (1940 – 9 January 2022) was an Australian-born theatre director who has worked internationally, particularly in Canada, Belgium, the United Kingdom, the United States and France.

== Early life ==
Derek Goldby was born in Adelaide but when he was five years old, his family returned to the UK. They had moved from Cambridge in 1937 for his father to take up an academic post in Adelaide, but returned in 1945 to London. Here Derek attended Dulwich College in London and Gonville and Caius College, Cambridge. While at Caius, he directed a production of Arnold Wesker's The Kitchen which led to his first professional job as Assistant Director at the Royal Court Theatre in London.

== Work in Britain ==
He left the Royal Court Theatre after one year to direct a repertory season at Barrow-in-Furness, which was followed by a season at Harrogate Theatre. The following two years he directed free-lance productions at Dundee, Bristol and Sheffield Repertory Companies, as well as at Stratford-on-Avon. In 1963, Goldby directed Chips with Everything, then produced Twelfth Night and Tons of Money at Her Majesty's, Barrow. Altogether, he directed 150 productions in these regional towns, including the English language premiere of Berthold Brecht's A day in the life of the great scholar Wu.

In 1966, Goldby became an assistant director to John Dexter at the National Theatre of Great Britain (now the Royal National Theatre) and worked on The Storm and Much Ado About Nothing. At age 25, he became the youngest director that the National Theatre had had up to that time when he directed Rosencrantz and Guildenstern Are Dead by the then mostly unknown Tom Stoppard. At that point, the play had been performed at the Edinburgh Festival Fringe, but it was Goldby's 1967 National Theatre production at the Old Vic that brought the play to international attention.

== Work in the United States ==
Rosencrantz and Guildenstern Are Dead went on to play on Broadway, where it was nominated for eight Tony Awards and received four, including Best Play. Goldby went on to direct several other productions on Broadway, including Loot by Joe Orton, and Her First Roman, a musical based on George Bernard Shaw's Caesar and Cleopatra (for which Goldby was brought in late in rehearsals as a replacement director).

In 1969, he was announced for a production of Harold Pinter's The Homecoming at the Guthrie Theater in Minneapolis (but only made his debut at the Guthrie with The Merry Wives of Windsor, from which he was eventually ousted). Already in 1968, he was announced as director for Bock and Harnick's musical The Rothschilds, but, after out-of-town tryouts, was eventually replaced by Michael Kidd.

Off-Broadway, Goldby directed Spitting Image by Colin Spencer in 1969. After a long absence, Goldby returned to New York in 1991 to direct Brad Fraser's Unidentified Human Remains and the True Nature of Love at the Orpheum Theatre.

== International work ==
Goldby spent most of the 1980s in Canada, where he directed for the Shaw Festival, the Stratford Festival, the Tarragon Theatre, CanStage, Théâtre de Quat'Sous and the National Theatre School. Among his work were several productions at the Shaw Festival, including Georges Feydeau's A Flea in Her Ear and a production of Rostand's Cyrano de Bergerac, featuring comic actor Heath Lamberts in the title role, which played at The Shaw in 1982 and 1983, and which was revived for a run at the Royal Alexandra theatre in 1985. Other work includes productions of Anton Chekhov's Uncle Vanya and August Strindberg's the Father at the Tarragon Theatre; and productions of Oscar Wilde's The Importance of Being Earnest and Frank Wedekind's Spring Awakening at CanStage. In Belgium, Goldby worked at Brussels' Théâtre de Poche, where he directed, amongst other work, productions of Martin McDonagh's The Lieutenant of Inishmore and Simon Stephens' Motortown.

== Later life and death ==
In the 2000s, Goldby worked in drama schools in England including RADA, Rose Bruford College and Central School of Speech and Drama, and directed a number of other plays including Autumn and Winter, by Lars Noren, at the Orange Tree Theatre.

Goldby never married. He died on 9 January 2022, at the age of 81.

== Thoughts on theatre and audiences ==
- "I enjoy directing. Since I was 16, I always knew I'd be a director."
- "I still enjoy working on Rosencrantz and Guildenstern Are Dead. It's still interesting because of what each new cast of actors brings to it. The text has in many ways the polished surface of metal. The values are verbal, like the plays of Wilde and Shaw, really. So I'm fascinated to see how actors respond to the challenge of the play. It has its own unique laws—unlike any other play in dramatic literature. Some people hate it."
- "Orton is our best social satirist since Jonathan Swift. 'Loot' tears apart the whole mystique of respectability and death, and does it with laughs. If Broadway audiences aren't sophisticated enough to accept it then there's no hope for the theatre here...I couldn't expect your establishment critics to like it. After all, it's a left-wing play in a right-wing country."
- "It's not that I don't believe in the theatre of shock, or the theatre of purpose, or the theatre of whatever. It's that I think we all need to be reminded of what people go to the theatre for. People go to the theatre basically—young and old—for an experience they can't get anywhere else. They want to laugh and cry."
