= Siminovitch Prize in Theatre =

Siminovitch Prize
- Awarded for: Best in Canadian theatre
- Country: Canada
- Presented by: Siminovitch Prize Foundation
- First award: 2001
- Website: https://www.siminovitchprize.com/

The Siminovitch Prize is Canada's largest theatre award recognizing excellence in mid-career directors, playwrights and designers. $100,000 is awarded annually to recipients.

Anyone may nominate a qualified candidate for the Prize, and winners are selected by a jury made up of prominent theatre professionals. Nominees must be a professional director, playwright, or designer who, in the preceding 10 years, has made a significant creative contribution to no fewer than three noteworthy theatre projects in Canada.

A condition of the award is that one quarter of the prize (CAD$25,000) must be awarded to an emerging artist "Protégé" selected by the winner. The Protégé must be an individual involved in professional direction, playwriting, or design in Canadian theatre. The winner may choose to grant the amount to a single Protégé or divide it between two eligible Protégés. Three finalists also receive CAD$5,000.

== History ==
Formally, the Elinore & Lou Siminovitch Prize in Theatre, the Siminovitch Prize was launched in 2000 to honour the values and achievements of the distinguished scientist Louis ("Lou") Siminovitch and his late wife Elinore Siminovitch who was a pioneering playwright. A group of Dr. Siminovitch’s friends and colleagues came together on the occasion of his 80th birthday to create this award . Twelve individuals and six organizations founded the prize; primary amongst them was the prize's largest financial sponsor, the BMO Financial Group.

In March 2012, BMO announced that the 12th edition of the prize would be its last. In an interview one of the prize's founders, Joseph Rotman, he stated that the Siminovitch Prize was never conceived to run in perpetuity. However, in July 2013, new financial supporters were secured resulting in the revival of the Siminovitch Prize. The Prize has continued ever since, under the direction of the Siminovitch Prize Foundation, funded annually by individual donors and corporate sponsors.

== Recipients ==
The recipients of the Siminovitch Prize since its inception are:

- 2001 (director) - Daniel Brooks
- 2002 (playwright) - Carole Fréchette
- 2003 (designer) - Louise Campeau
- 2004 (director) - Jillian Keiley
- 2005 (playwright) - John Mighton
- 2006 (designer) - Dany Lyne
- 2007 (director) - Brigitte Haentjens
- 2008 (playwright) - Daniel MacIvor
- 2009 (designer) - Ronnie Burkett
- 2010 (director) - Kim Collier
- 2011 (playwright) - Joan MacLeod
- 2012 (designer) - Robert Thomson
- 2013 (director) - Chris Abraham (to date, the only laureate to receive both the protégé and main prize)
- 2014 (playwright) - Olivier Choinière
- 2015 (designer) - Anick La Bissonnière
- 2016 (director) - Nadia Ross
- 2017 (playwright) - Marcus Youssef
- 2018 (designer) - Stéphanie Jasmin
- 2019 (directors) - Maiko Yamamoto and James Long
- 2020 (playwright) - Tara Beagan
- 2021 (designer) - Gillian Gallow
- 2022 (director) - Marie Brassard
- 2023 (playwright) - David Yee
- 2024 (designer) - Sonoyo Nishikawa
- 2025 (director) - Ravi Jain

The protégé recipients of the Siminovitch prize are:

- 2001 - Chris Abraham
- 2002 - Geneviève Billet
- 2003 - Magalie Amyot and Michèle Magnon
- 2004 - Danielle Irvine
- 2005 - Anton Piatigorsky
- 2006 - Camellia Koo and April Anne Viczko
- 2007 - Christian Lapointe
- 2008 - Daniel Arnold and Medina Hahn
- 2009 - Clea Minaker
- 2010 - Anita Rochon
- 2011 - Anusree Roy
- 2012 - Jason Hand and Raha Javanfar
- 2013 - Mitchell Cushman
- 2014 - Annick Lefebvre
- 2015 - Marilène Bastien
- 2016 - Shaista Laif and Sarah Conn
- 2017 - Christine Quintana
- 2018 - Max-Otto Fauteux
- 2019 - Conor Wylie
- 2020 - Joelle Peters
- 2021 - Joyce Padua and Joshua Quinlan
- 2022 - Philippe Boutin
- 2023 - Julie Phan
- 2024 - Mayumi Ide-Bergeron
- 2025 - Miriam Fernandes
