= Kristen Thomson =

Canadian actress and playwright

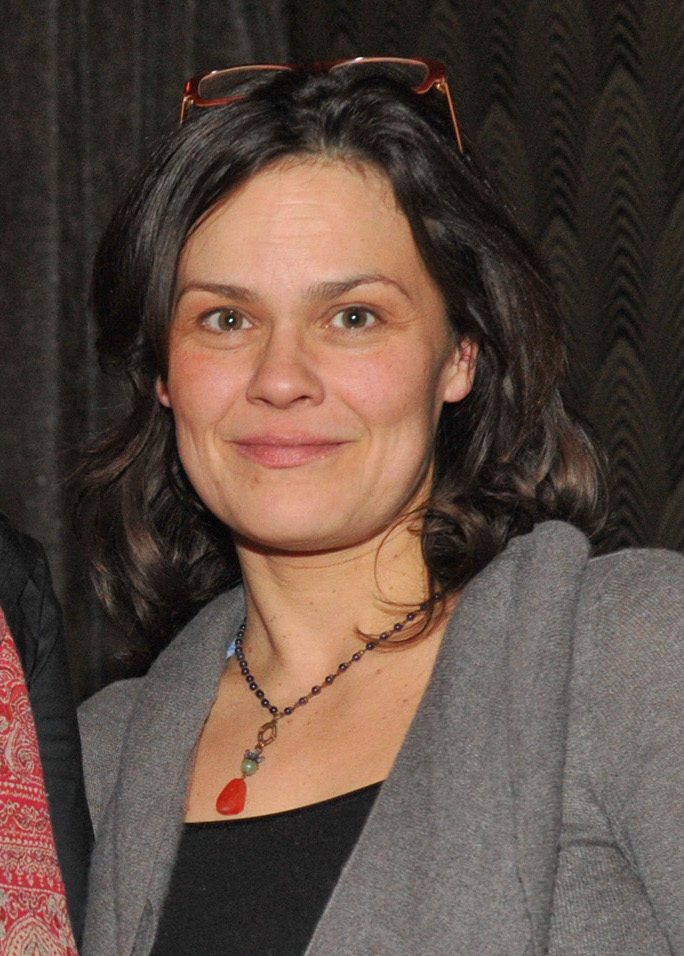
- Born: 1966 (age 59–60) [[London , Ontario]], Canada
- Occupation: Actress
- Years active: 1995 - present

Kristen Thomson (born 1966) is a Canadian actress and playwright. She has been described as "an icon of Canadian theatre".

== Early life and education ==
Thomson was born in Toronto, Ontario. She studied drama at the University of Toronto and the National Theatre School of Canada.

== I, Claudia ==
Thomson is known for her one-woman play I, Claudia, which was adapted to film in 2004. In that play and film, Thomson plays all of the roles, using masks to change character. The play has been described as a "deeply moving one-woman mask show about the inner life of a pre-adolescent girl". It received praise from critics and was popularly successful.

== Awards ==
In 2003, Thomson won an ACTRA Award for her performance in I Shout Love (2001), a short film directed by Sarah Polley. She has won four Dora Awards for her stage work. Her most recent win was for the Genie Award for Best Performance by an Actress in a Supporting Role in the movie Away From Her.

== Stage ==
Year	Title	Company / Venue	Role	Notes
2001	A Midsummer Night's Dream	Theatre Passe Muraille, Toronto	Bottom / Hermia	
2018	Every Brilliant Thing	Berkley Street Theatre, Toronto		
2019	The Wedding Party	Streetscar Crowsnest Theatre, Toronto		Play written by Thomson

== Film ==
Year	Title	Role	Notes
1997	Cream Sauce	Adult Helen	Short film
2000	Landscaping		Short film
2000	The Law of Enclosures	Myrah	
2001	I Shout Love	Tessa	Short film
2002	Flower & Garnet	Barb	
2003	Proteus	Kate	
2003	The Republic of Love	Charlotte	
2004	I, Claudia	Claudia	
2006	Away from Her	Kristy	
2008	How Are You?		Short film
2014	What We Have	Patricia	
2016	Window Horses	Caroline	Voice role
2017	Downsizing	Good Friend Gina	

== Television ==
Year	Title	Role	Notes
1995	Net Worth	Pat Lindsay	TV film
2002	The Matthew Shepard Story	Romaine Patterson	TV film
2005	It's Me...Gerald	Hedda	Episode: "Goodnight, Mr. Butterson"
2005	This Is Wonderland	n/a	Episode: "2.8"
2006	This Is Wonderland	n/a	Episode: "3.12"
2006	The Great Polar Bear Adventure	Ikuk (voice)	TV film
2008	Of Murder and Memory	Nurse	TV film
2010	Flashpoint	Kate	Episode: "Jumping at Shadows"
2011	The Listener	Corrinne Rommilly	Episode: "In His Sights"
2012	The Firm	Eileen Bower	Episode: "Chapter Eleven"
2012	Dual Suspects	Young Woman	Episode: "The Carpenter Story"
2017–2019	Cardinal	Noelle Dyson	Miniseries
2023	Murdoch Mysteries	Emily Carr	"Murdoch and the Mona Lisa"

== Publications ==
- I, Claudia (2004, Playwrights Canada Press)
- Someone else (2014, Playwrights Canada Press)
