= Bill Glassco =

Canadian theatre director (1935–2004)

- Born: William Grant Glassco; August 30, 1935; Quebec City, Quebec
- Died: September 13, 2004 (aged 69); Toronto, Ontario
- Known for: Theatre director, producer and translator.
- Awards: Order of Canada

William Grant Glassco, OC (August 30, 1935 – September 13, 2004) was a Canadian theatre director, producer, translator and founder of Toronto's Tarragon Theatre.

Born in Quebec City, Quebec, he studied at the University of Toronto, Princeton University and Oxford University. From 1959 to 1964, Glassco taught English at the University of Toronto. He lived in New York City from 1967 to 1969, where he studied acting and directing at New York University. Glassco returned to Canada in 1969. He founded the Tarragon Theatre in 1970 with his wife Jane (née Gordon), and stayed there until 1982. Later, he became the artistic director of the CentreStage Theatre Company which merged, in 1988, with the Toronto Free Theatre to become CanStage. He is also known for introducing the English-speaking world (along with co-translator John Van Burek) to the plays of Quebec playwright Michel Tremblay, including Les Belles-sœurs and Albertine in Five Times.

In 1982, he was made an Officer of the Order of Canada.

In 2002, he was awarded the Silver Ticket Lifetime Achievement Dora Award.
