= Tarragon Theatre =

Theatre in Toronto, Canada

Coordinates: 43.674970°N 79.412995°W

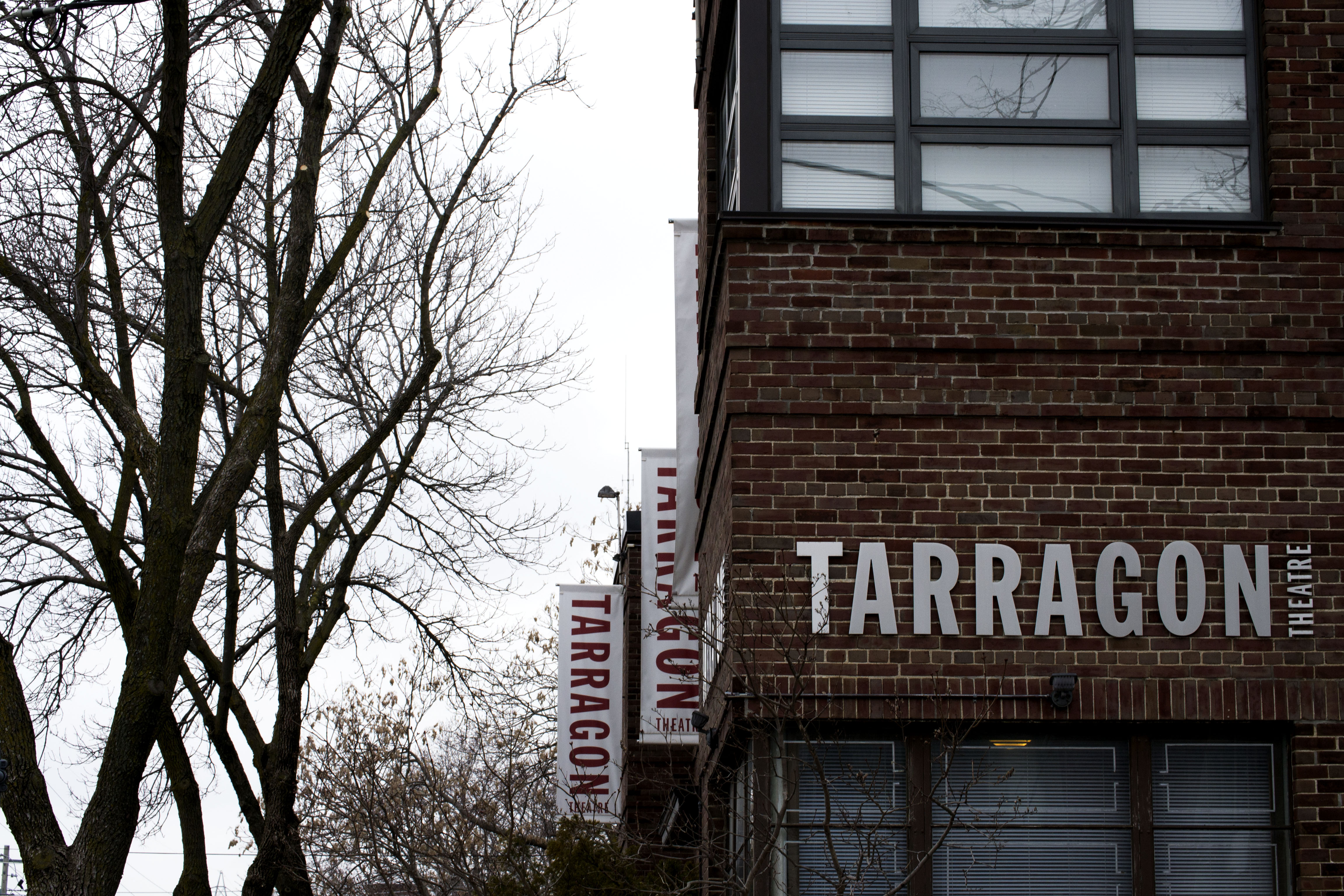
- Interactive map of Tarragon Theatre
- Address: 30 Bridgman Avenue; Toronto, Ontario; Canada
- Capacity: Main Space: 205; Extra Space: 100
- Type: performing arts centre

Construction
- Opened: 1970

Website
- tarragontheatre.com

The Tarragon Theatre is a theatre in Toronto, Ontario, Canada, and one of the main centers for contemporary playwriting in the country. Located near Casa Loma, the theatre was founded by Bill and Jane Glassco in 1970. Bill Glassco was the artistic director from 1971 to 1982. In 1982, Urjo Kareda took over as artistic director and remained in that role until his death in December 2001. Richard Rose was appointed artistic director in July 2002. Mike Payette assumed the role of artistic director in September 2021 upon Rose's retirement, with Lisa Li joining as Executive Director in June 2024.

In 1987, Tarragon purchased and renovated the building that has been its home since 1971. There are two performance spaces: the Mainspace (205 seats), and The Extra Space (113 seats).

Tarragon is well known for its development, creation and encouragement of new work. Over 170 works have premiered at Tarragon. Playwrights who have premiered their work here include Morwyn Brebner, David French, Michael Healey, Joan MacLeod, Morris Panych, James Reaney, Jason Sherman, Brendan Gall, Hannah Moscovitch, Ellie Moon and Judith Thompson.

== Background ==
The theatre is housed in a building originally designed for light industrial use, including as a cribbage board factory. It cost $9,000 to renovate.

The company's first production was David Freeman's Creeps.

Tarragon has championed the work of Canadian playwrights David French, Michel Tremblay, Judith Thompson, Jason Sherman, George F. Walker, Morris Panych, Carole Frechette, Michael Healey, Daniel MacIvor, Hannah Moscovitch, Wajdi Mouawad and others, as well as productions of plays by canonical playwrights such as Anton Chekhov and August Strindberg.

Urjo Kareda founded the theatre's Playwrights Unit in 1982.

The Spring Arts Fair showcased works in progress, including an early version of Ted Dykstra and Richard Greenblatt's 2 Pianos, 4 Hands, which later toured around the world.

The theatre holds two performances venues, containing approximately 200 and 100 seats respectively. One of the rehearsal halls can be used as a performance area, seating 60.

The 2020–21 season was cancelled due to the COVID-19 pandemic, and productions were moved online, including audio recordings of plays available through a CBC podcast.

While affirming Tarragon's historic 50 plus years commitment to playwright-centred creation and production, current Artistic Director, Mike Payette (appointed September 2021) has expanded the company's artistic and dramaturgical scope through new work that explores form, interlingualism, and interdisciplinary mediums. He has helped strengthen partnerships with theatre companies and artists across Canada, while nurturing impactful local companies in Toronto such as Musical Stage Company, Obsidian Theatre Company, dance Immersion, Outside the March, and many others. His tenure emphasizes community engagement, national collaboration, and the nurturing of a “neighbourhood theatre” at Tarragon. He continues to amplify Tarragon’s new play development programs, new programmatic opportunities for interdisciplinary and non-text based works through the Greenhouse Festival, and has forged new collaborations with emerging and established Canadian Playwrights including Marcus Youssef, Pamela Mala Sinha, Makram Ayache, Christine Quintana, Ho Ka Kei (Jeff Ho), Judith Thompson, David Yee, among many others.

In June, 2024, Lisa Li was appointed Executive Director. A producer and executive non-profit leader with previous experience at Prairie Theatre Exchange, Soulpepper Theatre, the Shaw Festival, and various independent companies, Li joins Payette in leading Tarragon towards an international vision, re-affirming the company as the “home of the Canadian Playwright,” while investing in strategic partnerships, audience and donor development, and organizational resiliency.

The company's 2026/27 season, marks Tarragon's fifty-fifth anniversary, emphasizing its historical legacy and continued mission of nurturing Canadian plays and playwrights. The 2026/27, will comprise of eight productions over nine months, including notable works and playwrights such as: Kat Sandler (Yaga, dir. Jill Carter), Morris Panych (The Shoplifters, dir. Panych), Katherine Gauthier (You’re Still Here, dir. Andrew Kushnir), Anahita Dehbonehie (Call Me By My Cousin’s Name, dir. Mitchell Cushman), Robert Chafe (The Night Logan Woke Up, by Michel Marc Bouchard, translated by Chafe, dir. Jillian Keiley), Luke Reece (Definition, dir. Mike Payette), and Ho Ka Kei (Jeff Ho) (Prophetess, dir. Mike Payette, starring Karen Robinson as Margaret Anjou).

It remains one of the foremost organizations for producing new plays in Canada. The company has received numerous awards including Governor General's Awards, Dora Mavor Moore Awards and the Premier's Award for Excellence in the Arts. The company's archives are held at the University of Guelph.

== Artistic directors ==
- Bill Glassco (1971–1982)
- Urjo Kareda (1982–2002)
- Richard Rose (2002–2021)
- Mike Payette (2021–present)

== Executive Directors ==
- Mallory Gilbert (1971–2005)
- Camilla Holland (2006–2012)
- Gideon Arthurs (2012–2014)
- Susan Moffat (2014–2018)
- Andrea Vagianos (2018–2024)
- Lisa Li (2024–present)

== 2008-2009 season ==
- Scorched - by Wajdi Mouawad
- The Black Rider: The Casting of the Magic Bullets - by Robert Wilson, Tom Waits, and William S. Burroughs
- Bashir Lazhar - by Évelyne de la Chenelière, translated by Morwyn Brebner
- Moliere - by Sabina Berman
- East of Berlin - by Hannah Moscovitch
- Ubuntu - by The Ensemble
- The Patient Hour - by Kristen Thomson
- Another Home Invasion - by Joan MacLeod
- A Beautiful View - by Daniel MacIvor
- House of Many Tongues - by Jonathan Garfinkel

== 2023-2024 season ==
- The Last Epistle of Tightrope Time - written and performed by Walter Borden, directed by Peter Hinton-Davis
- A Poem for Rabia - written by Nikki Shaffeeullah, co-directed by Clare Preuss and Donna-Michelle St. Bernard
- Winthrop Park - written by Morris Panych, directed by Jackie Maxwell
- Guilt (A Love Story) - written and performed by Diane Flacks, directed by Alisa Palmer
- 3 Fingers Back - written by Donna-Michelle St. Bernard, co-directed by Cole Alvis and Yvette Nolan
- El Terremoto - written by Christine Quintana, directed by Guillermo Verdecchia
- Come Home – The Legend of Daddy Hall - written by: Audrey Dwyer, directed by: Mike Payette
