= List of LGBTQ-related films of 1965 =

This is a list of lesbian, gay, bisexual, transgender or queer-related films released in 1965. It contains theatrically released films that deal with important gay, lesbian, bisexual, transgender or queer characters or issues and may have same-sex romance or relationships as a plot device.

== Films ==
Title	Director	Country	Genre	Cast	Notes
Bus Riley's Back in Town	Harvey Hart	United States	Drama	Ann-Margret, Michael Parks, Janet Margolin	
Darling	John Schlesinger	United Kingdom	Drama	Julie Christie, Dirk Bogarde, Laurence Harvey, José Luis de Villalonga, Roland Curram, Basil Henson, Helen Lindsay, Marika Rivera, Alex Scott, Brian Wilde, Pauline Yates and Trevor Bowen	
Haremde Dört Kadın	Halit Refiğ	Turkey	Drama	Tanju Gürsu, Nilüfer Aydan, Pervin Par, Cüneyt Arkin, Sami Ayanoglu and Ayfer Feray	a.k.a. Four Women in the Harem
Horse	Andy Warhol	United States	Fantasy	Edie Sedgwick, Gregory Battcock, Tosh Carillo, Ondine, Norman Glick, Daniel Cassidy Jr., and Larry Latrae (Latreille)	
Inside Daisy Clover	Robert Mulligan	United States	Drama	Natalie Wood, Christopher Plummer, Robert Redford, Ruth Gordon, Roddy McDowall and Katharine Bard	Screenplay by Gavin Lambert, based on his novel of the same name
The Knack ...and How to Get It	Richard Lester	United Kingdom	Comedy	Rita Tushingham, Ray Brooks, Michael Crawford and Donal Donnelly	Based on the play The Knack by Ann Jellicoe
The Life of Juanita Castro	Andy Warhol	United States	Comedy	Marie Menken, Elecktrah (Lobel), Waldo Díaz-Balart, Mercedes Ospina, Aniram Anipso, Marina Ospina, Ultra Violet and Ronald Tavel	
My Hustler	Andy Warhol	United States	Drama	Ed Hood, Paul America, Joe Campbell, Genevieve Charbin and Dorothy Dean	
Paris-secret	Édouard Logereau	France	Mondo documentary film	Romain Bouteille and Henri Garcin	Sequence in a bar in Paris with transvestite men
Scream of the Butterfly	Eber Lobato	United States	Exploitation	Nélida Lobato, Nick Novarro, Richard Beebe, Robert Miller, John Richards and Leona Gage	
Vinyl	Andy Warhol	United States	Science fiction	Gerard Malanga, Edie Sedgwick, Ondine, Tosh Carillo and Larry Latrae	Early adaptation of the novel A Clockwork Orange by Anthony Burgess
Winter Kept Us Warm	David Secter	Canada	Drama, romance	John Labow, Henry Tarvainen, Joy Tepperman, Janet Amos	
With Beauty and Sorrow	Masahiro Shinoda	Japan	Drama	Kaoru Yachigusa, Mariko Kaga, So Yamamura	Based on the novel Beauty and Sadness by Yasunari Kawabata
