= Irene Mawer =

English educator

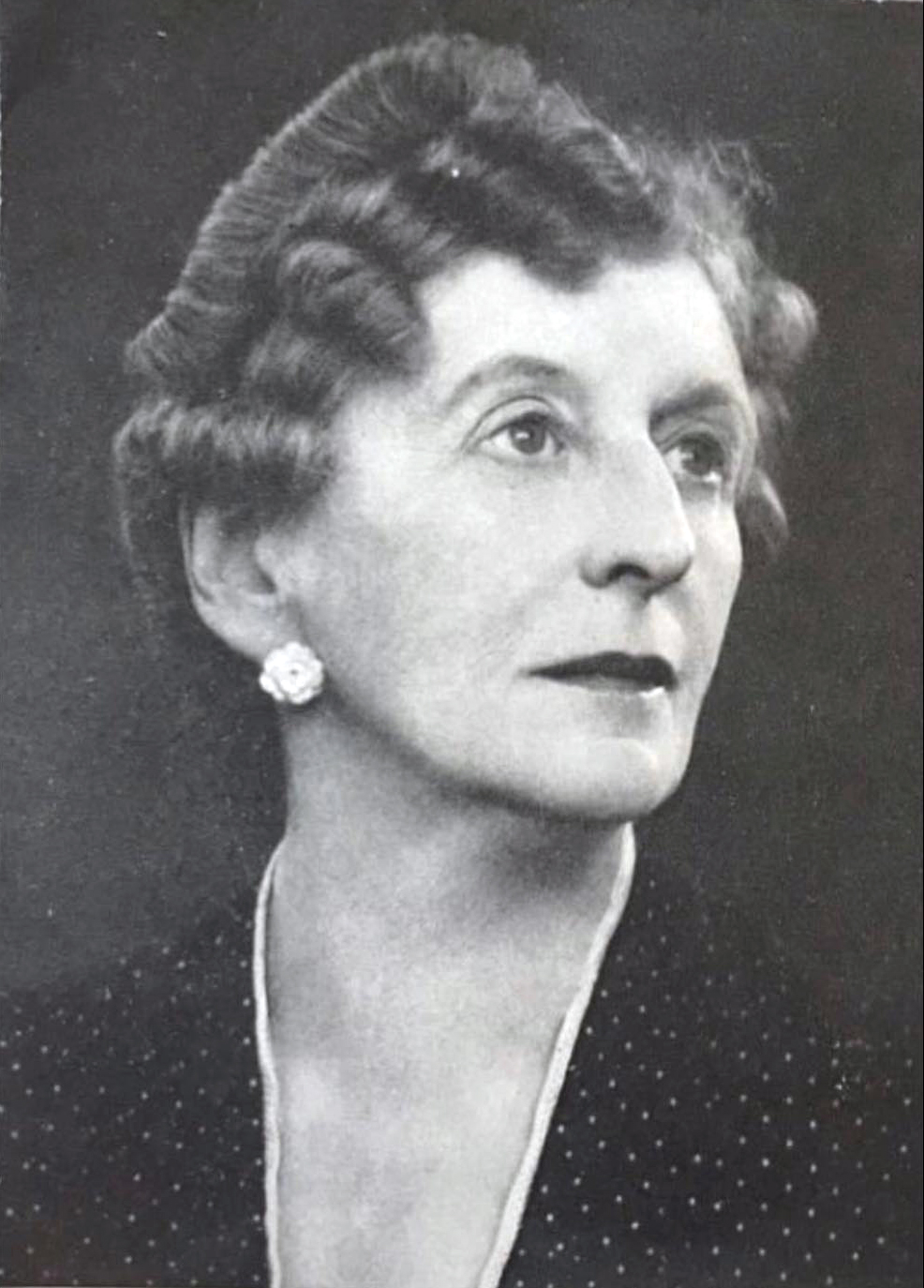
- Born: Irene Rose Mawer; 13 March 1893; Wandsworth, England
- Died: 1 December 1962 (aged 69); Blewbury, England
- Education: Royal Central School of Speech and Drama
- Occupations: teacher of mime/movement/voice/theatre skills; producer; director; choreographer; performer
- Years active: 1916-1959
- Known for: mime; speech and voice; poetry; words; word rhythms; movement; Choral speaking; Classical Greek Dance

Irene Mawer (13 March 1893 – 1 December 1962), was an English exponent of mime; drama; voice; and mime in education. She was later known as Irene Dale and Irene Perugini.

Mawer was a co-founder of the Ginner-Mawer School of Dance and Drama (1916-1954) together with Ruby Ginner, and sole founder of the Institute of Mime.

== Early life and education ==
Irene Rose Mawer was born in 1893, in Wandsworth, on the outskirts of London, England - at that time a wealthy and prosperous area. Her father, Henry (Harry) Mawer, was a Yorkshireman, and her mother, Rosina Alberta Mawer (née Turner), was originally from Devon.

As a child at home, Mawer was almost always alone, and her favourite pastime was to make up little plays and act them out around the house and in the garden. As an adult, she remembered these games and used them as a basis for teaching mime to infants, known at Ginner-Mawer as 'Bobblies'. Mawer attended Putney High School for Girls, where the aims were to educate and inspire the pupils and to help them find passions and achieve ambitions. The headmistress, Miss Major, fostered and developed Mawer's love of Ancient Greece.

Prior to the death of her father in 1909, Mawer's upbringing had been affluent. Census returns show live-in staff at the large family home, and newspaper reports describe participation in fashionable society weddings.

In later life, Mawer founded the Institute of Mime where the focus was on education through movement. However, Mawer was also passionate about words and had planned to study literature at university, but family circumstances prevented this. As soon as the opportunity arose, Mawer again took up her studies, this time working in the dramatic arts with Madame Kate Flinn.

Irene was accepted as a student of Elsie Fogerty at the Central School of Speech and Drama where she also undertook the role of Pivot Club Social Secretary in 1915.

== Career ==
During the course of her studies at the Central School of Speech and Drama Mawer met Ruby Ginner and they formed a friendship which was to last for the next 47 years, until Mawer's death.

In 1916, while a student at Central School of Speech and Drama, Ruby Ginner's theatre company presented a mime play called 'Et Puis Bonsoir', with Mawer in the role of Harlequin. On the second day of rehearsal, Ruby Ginner was taken ill and left a bemused Mawer in charge. Thus began Mawer's first attempt at teaching on her own terms. This was also the start of the professional partnership which became the Ginner-Mawer School of Dance and Drama.

Mawer learned much of the theory of rhythmic movement and of how muscles and the nervous system developed from her attendance at Ruby Ginner's dance classes. She then put this together with Elsie Fogerty's Greek Chorus lessons on co-ordination of the rhythms of speech and movement and this led to her own technical basis for the teaching of mime.

Mawer was also interested in words, and in the relationship between words and movement. In 1925 she published a book entitled 'The Dance of Words' containing poems, or 'word-rhythms', which were intended to be connected to movement. In the book, Mawer demonstrated her experimental work with art forms, most especially with Ruby Ginner's Revived (Classical) Greek Dance. This experimental body of work began in 1916 when Mawer, with Ginner, gave her first public demonstration of 'verse dancing'.

In 1920 and again in 1925/26 Mawer worked closely with Sybil Thorndike and Lewis Casson in their double bill of Greek Tragedy plays ('The Trojan Women'; 'Medea'). Mawer produced the Greek Chorus and also acted in the plays. In 1928 Irene performed what was to become her defining role, that of Pierrot in 'L'Enfant Prodigue', a mime play by Michel Carré.

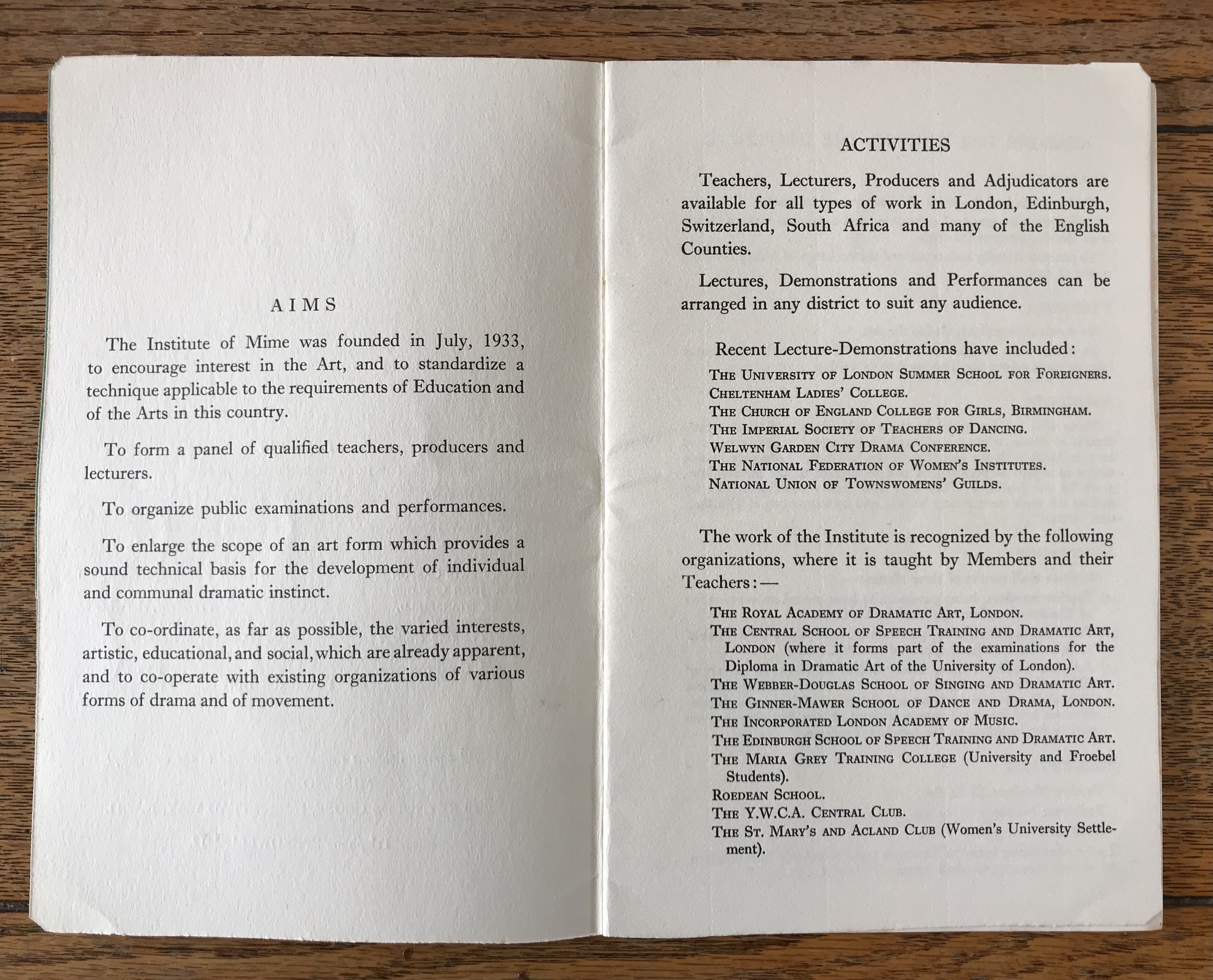
Handbook of the Institute of Mime detailing their aims and activities.

With the support of some sixty individuals from various branches of music and the dramatic arts and also from women's suffrage, Mawer formed the Institute of Mime in the UK in 1933. The aims included a standardisation of technique and of teaching, with one of the intentions being to use mime as an educational tool, particularly focusing on helping women and girls by working in partnership with organisations such as the Women's Institute and the Girl Guides.

The Ginner-Mawer School of Dance and Drama closed in 1954 on the retirement of Ruby Ginner. Mawer continued in paid employment for a further five years as Senior Tutor and Lecturer at Pamela Chapman's Birmingham School of Speech Training and Dramatic Art (BSSTDA), now known as the Birmingham School of Acting. In 1959, Mawer retired and moved to live near Ruby Ginner in Blewbury in the south of England.

== Influence and legacy ==
Irene Mawer and Ruby Ginner worked together to create what was to become the Ginner-Mawer School of Dance and Drama. All-female productions were a feature of the Ginner-Mawer School of Dance and Drama and extended to performances directed by Mawer outside of the Ginner-Mawer School. The same female focus was present in productions such as those held in Hyde Park, revealing an interesting and under-researched phenomenon of women in creative roles in theatre during this period.

In 1923, Mawer was one of the first people to be involved in the newly created Diploma in Dramatic Art, the first qualification of its type in the UK. The syllabus included mime, and Mawer taught this as part of her duties at the Central School of Speech and Drama which was newly affiliated to the University of London. In 1927, a mime play written and produced by Mawer ('Priscilla or the Lost Columbine') formed part of the Dramatic Examination performance for this Diploma of Dramatic Art.

At Ginner-Mawer mime was not seen as a stand-alone subject, it was seen as a foundation subject for all other forms of movement and speech. Actor, director and drama theorist, Michel Saint-Denis participated in the activities of the Institute of Mime, including giving a Guest Lecture in 1936. In the years before World War II Mawer was the leading figure in mime education in the UK and the first performer of mime and the first educationalist to publish a seminal history of mimetic movement from its primitive and religious origins. Members of the Institute of Mime gave lectures and/or demonstrations at a variety of locations, including the Froebel Society (now the National Froebel Foundation; the Central Association for Mental Welfare (now Mind (charity)); the Women's League of Health and Beauty; HM Prison Holloway (a women's prison); and the British Drama League.

By the end of the 1940s Mawer's method of mime was well established and involved a very high degree of training to make movement effective. Mawer's method contributed to the rapid changes in body training during the first four decades of the twentieth century and the work of the Ginner-Mawer School can be said to form a link between Isadora Duncan and Rudolf Laban. Mawer's influence was felt around the world with students of the Institute of Mime teaching in South Africa, Costa Rica and Canada and also in Australia and New Zealand and performing a mime play in Costa Rica. Modern-day influence can still be felt, e.g., in Canada in the performance of clowning and also in the Indian multi-arts centre Triveni Kala Sangam founded by Ginner-Mawer Old Girl Sundari K. Shridharani, while in the US, Christian mime ministry uses Mawer to show that mime can be of God, as well as secular.

In England, alumni of the Institute of Mime included Rose Bruford who taught at both the Royal Academy of Music (RAM) and the Royal Academy of Dramatic Art (RADA) and then opened her own school in 1950 - the Rose Bruford Training College of Speech and Drama, now the Rose Bruford College of Theatre and Performance. Other alumni staff appointments included positions at the Central School of Speech and Drama (later known as the Royal Central School of Speech and Drama); the Ben Greet Academy, the Webber-Douglas School of Acting (later known as the Webber Douglas Academy of Dramatic Art); the Incorporated London Academy of Music; the Headquarters of the Young Women's Christian Association (YWCA), plus lecturers for the National Federation of Women's Institutes (WI).

In 2009, 47 years after her death, one of Mawer's poems, 'The Tree in the Wind', was used as an examination question at the Kernersville Elementary School in North Carolina, USA. Originally published in Mawer's book of poetry, 'The Dance of Words', in 1925, the poem was still being used in 2022 by pupils in North Carolina as part of on-line teaching resources.

== Personal life ==
Irene Mawer was the youngest of six children and survived her parents and all of her siblings.

In 1917, Mawer married Robert Jacomb Norris Dale, who was killed in action during World War I, leaving her a widow after 10 months of marriage at the age of 24. Dale had been talented at art, the law, and sport; his story is told in a book which pays tribute to some of the players from Rosslyn Park Rugby Club, where he had been a member.

In 1930 Mawer married for a second time, to fellow Londoner and widower, Mark Edward Perugini (1876-1948), a theatre historian, journalist, author and great nephew by marriage of Charles Dickens. Perugini's books include 'A Pageant of the Dance and Ballet'; 'The Flame: a pantomime in one act'; 'The Art of Ballet'; 'Mime'; 'Victorian Days and Ways'; 'Enter Victoria'; 'The Omnibus Box'.

There were no children or step-children from either marriage.

In December 1962, aged 69, Mawer suffered a stroke and died in hospital in Oxford.

After cremation, Mawer's ashes were scattered in the Rose Garden at Oxford Crematorium.

== Alumni and associates ==
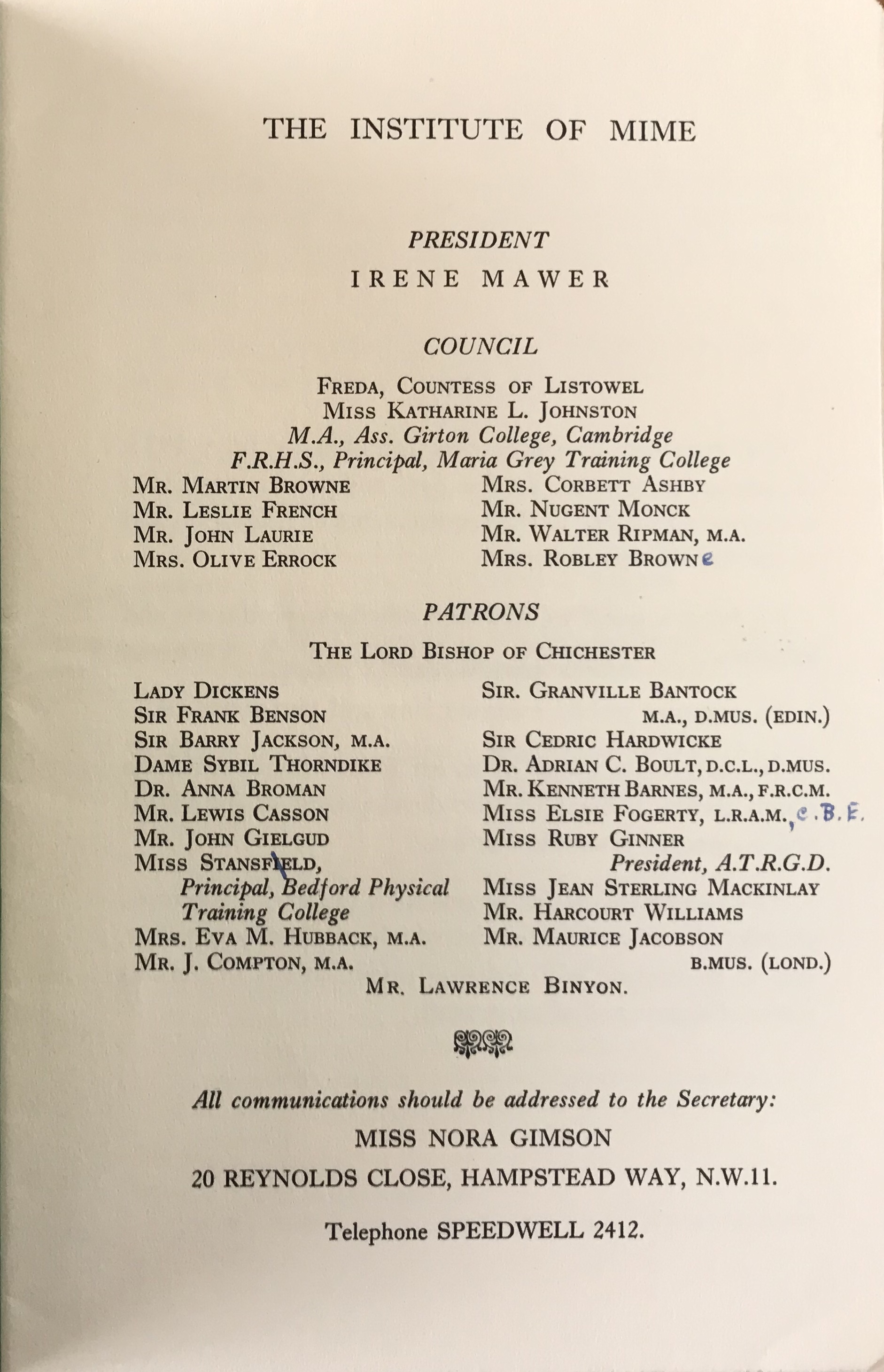
Supporters of the Institute of Mime

Notable students at the Ginner-Mawer School of Dance and Drama include:

- Mildred Robley-Browne (née Peters) who opened a school of dance and mime in New Zealand, which was passed to a fellow Ginner-Mawer 'Old Girl' Rene Almond (aka Irene Mulvany-Gray) who, in the 1920s and 1930s, taught dance and mime in New Zealand, Australia and Canada. Between 1925 and 1956 Mildred was a beloved headmistress of three girls' boarding schools in the London area. It was Mildred's focus on "the Greek ideal of the inseparable association of art with education" which gave her schools their unique character. Mildred remained a close associate of both Ruby Ginner and Irene Mawer throughout her career as a headmistress.
- Marjorie Duncombe who assisted Mary Bagot Stack with the set-up of the Bagot Stack Health School which became the Women's League of Health and Beauty.
- Susan Mitchell-Smith (née Ellis) (d.19 February 2022) who was the Founder and Principal of the Welland School of Dancing; Chairman (1983-1994) and examiner (retired) of ISTD Classical Greek Dance Association; Archivist of Classical Greek Dance Archives.

The Institute of Mime, which Mawer founded in 1933, had a substantial list of supporters on its council and as its patrons. Interested parties included not only actors, dancers, musicians, composers and theatre people, but also promoters of women's suffrage and women's education, including:

- Katharine Louisa Johnston (1878-1960), Girton College, Cambridge. Principal of Maria Grey Training College 1913–1938; pioneer of education for women; scientist; member of National Froebel Foundation.
- Margaret Stansfeld teacher; educator; founder and Principal of Bedford Physical Training College.

== Selected works ==
Irene Mawer published several books, including:

- Bobbly Rhymes for Bobbly Times, T.M. Middleton & Co, London, 1919
- The Dance of Words, J M Dent & Sons, London, 1925
- Mime as an Educational Force (publication details unknown)
- The Art of Mime: its history and technique in education and the theatre, Methuen & Co, London, 1932
- Twelve Mime Plays: a collection of wordless plays arranged to music, Methuen & Co, 1933
