= Ratch Wallace =

Canadian actor (1944–2011)

Richard "Ratch" Wallace (November 7, 1944 – October 16, 2011) was a Canadian film and television actor, most noted for his recurring supporting role as Kenny Volker in the 1980s television series Seeing Things.

Born and raised in Toronto, Ontario, Wallace was known as Ritch in his youth before opting to change his nickname to Ratch after jazz musician Jonah Jones misspelled his name that way when giving him an autograph. He began his career as a stage actor with Toronto's Crest Theatre, having his first film role when he was cast in David Secter's 1966 film The Offering. He subsequently acted in films including Isabel, The Act of the Heart, Journey, The Merry Wives of Tobias Rouke and Sunday in the Country, and had a guest role in an episode of Adventures in Rainbow Country, before trying his hand at filmmaking as executive producer of The Hard Part Begins, and screenwriter of Age of Innocence (also known as Ragtime Summer). He received a Canadian Film Award nomination for Best Screenplay at the 28th Canadian Film Awards in 1977 for Age of Innocence.

He was subsequently also a writer for the television miniseries Jack London's Tales of the Klondike.
