= The Offering (1966 film) =

1966 Canadian drama film

- Directed by: David Secter
- Written by: Iain Ewing; Martin Lager; Gillian Lennox; Michael Ondaatje; David Secter; Jan Steen
- Produced by: Robert Fresco; John Labow; Gillian Lennox; Wayne Lum; Clarke Mackey; Michael Ondaatje; David Secter
- Starring: Kee Faun; Ratch Wallace
- Cinematography: Stan Lipinski
- Edited by: Tony Lower
- Music by: Paul Hoffert
- Production company: Secter Films
- Distributed by: Columbia Pictures
- Release date: November 24, 1966
- Running time: 80 minutes
- Country: Canada
- Language: English

The Offering is a Canadian romantic drama film, directed by David Secter and released in 1966. One of the first Canadian films ever to depict an interracial relationship, the film portrays a romance between Mei-Lin (Kee Faun), a dancer with a touring Peking opera company, and Gordon (Ratch Wallace), a stagehand at the theatre in Toronto where the troupe is performing. Philip Givens, the real-life mayor of Toronto at the time the film was made, appears in the film as himself; the cast also includes Ellen Yamasaki and Marvin Goldhar.

The film was shot in part at Toronto's Royal Alexandra Theatre.

The film was more poorly received than Secter's 1965 film Winter Kept Us Warm, and because Secter had largely worked with non-union crew, the International Alliance of Theatrical Stage Employees intervened to prevent the film from being screened theatrically anywhere outside of Toronto.

Soon after the film's release, Secter abandoned most of his new projects and moved to New York City, where he joined a bohemian artists' commune and worked as a theatre director, and did not direct another film until the low-budget sex comedy Getting Together in 1976.
