= Journey (1972 film) =

- Directed by: Paul Almond
- Written by: Paul Almond
- Produced by: Paul Almond
- Starring: Geneviève Bujold; John Vernon; Beata Hartig; Meg Hogarth
- Cinematography: Jean Boffety
- Edited by: Honor Griffith; James Mitchell
- Music by: Luke Gibson; Nexus
- Release date: 1972 (Canada)
- Running time: 88 minutes
- Country: Canada
- Language: English

Journey is a 1972 Canadian film written, directed and produced by Paul Almond.

== Synopsis ==
Journey is the allegorical story of a young woman's struggle - outside the normal framework of space and time - to find herself.

Found drifting down the Saguenay River, half-drowned and clinging to a log, a woman (Geneviève Bujold) is rescued by Boulder (John Vernon), who carries her to Undersky, his commune in the Quebec wilderness. Named after the river from which she was saved, Saguenay is haunted by memories of her past and remains unresponsive for days, drifting in and out of consciousness. She gradually becomes aware of the life going on around her and begins to explore it. But she senses she has brought ill fortune to this community and fears something in her past has doomed her and all who know her. Finally, she journeys back up the river to confront the nightmare of her past. By doing so, she breaks through to the present and arrives at the mouth of the river.

The cast also includes George Sperdakos, Elton Hayes, Luke Gibson, Greg Adams, Mary Bellows, Gale Garnett, Judith Gault, Beata Hartig, Meg Hogarth, Gary McKeehan, Patsy Rahn and Ratch Wallace.

== Cast ==
- Genevieve Bujold as Saguenay
- John Vernon as Boulder Allin
- George Sperdakos as Vid, The Blacksmith
- Elton Hayes as Piers, The Farmer
- Luke Gibson as Jude, The Balladeer
- Greg Adams as Hawkins, The Teamster
- Mary Bellows as Beth, The Mother
- Gale Garnett as Morgan, The Herbalist
- Judith Gault as Elena, The Cowherd
- Beata Hartig as Sore, The Weaver
- Meg Hogarth as Molly, The Gardener
- Gary McKeehan as Noah, The Carpenter
- Patsy Rahn as Taansy, The Berry-Maid
- Ratch Wallace as Timber, The Woodsman

== Reception ==
This is Paul Almond's last film in his trilogy with Bujold that began with Isabel (1968) and The Act of the Heart (1970). Obscure and complex, the final film is considered the weakest of the trilogy, lacking the passion of the first two. Poorly received, it was a box-office failure and ended Almond's attempt to create art film in Québec.

It was featured in the Canadian Cinema television series which aired on CBC Television in 1974.
