= Thea Stanley Hughes =

Australian writer and health advocate

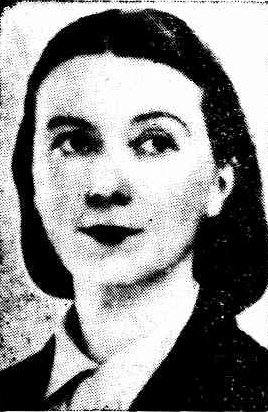
- Thea Stanley Hughes, from a 1940 Australian newspaper.

Thea Stanley Hughes (born around 1907, died after 1990) was an Australian writer and health advocate, president of the Women's League of Health in Australia.

== Early life and education ==
Thea Stanley Hughes was born in England, raised in Australia, the daughter of writer J. Stanley Hughes. She earned a bachelor's degree at the University of Sydney. She studied dance with Ruby Ginner and Irene Mawer in London, and trained as a health educator at the Bagot Stack Health School in England.

== Career ==
In 1935, Hughes brought the work of Mary Bagot Stack and Prunella Stack to Australia, and was founder and president of the Australian Women's League of Health, based in Sydney. She established branches across Australia, including in Melbourne, Perth, and Adelaide. Her work with the league, which continued into the 1950s, encouraged Australian women to pursue physical fitness through exercise, diet, hygiene, and outdoor recreation. The organization also offered pre-natal and post-natal relaxation and exercise classes. One of the League's signature events was a mass public gathering of women for outdoor exercise, often led by Hughes.

Hughes opined against high-heeled shoes, and that good posture, grace, and muscle tone were more conducive to health and beauty. "Freedom can only be achieved through health. If you are unhealthy, you are a slave to your body," she instructed her followers. "The only way to achieve enduring health is by regular exercise." She invited German modern dancer Anny Fligg to tour Australia in 1937 and 1938, giving demonstrations and lectures.

Hughes wrote biographies of Australian historical figures for young readers, including Arthur Phillip, James Cook, Ernest Giles, and Matthew Flinders. Some of her writings reflect her interest in anthroposophy and other forms of mysticism. She also recorded audio books, including biographies of Helen Keller, Alexander Graham Bell, and Florence Nightingale.

== Selected works ==
- Antidote: Gleanings from the "Movement" (1950)
- Adventure in Movement, a New Approach to Physical Training (1953)
- Discovery in the Modern World (pamphlet, 1970)
- Movement; League of Health (1972)
- Men in the Making (1975)
- Towards Self-Development (1976)
- Movement: For Those Who Would Bestir Themselves (1976)
- Twentieth Century Question: Reincarnation (1976)
- For Your Spare Half Hour (1978)
- The Unknown Drug (1978)
- Towards Social Health (1979)
- Dear Humanity (1979)
- Enduring Deeds in Science, Exploration & Leadership (1980)
- James Cook (biography, 1981)
- Alternative Thinking (1982)
- Arthur Phillip (biography, 1982)
- Warnings (1983)
- Matthew Flinders (biography, 1984)
- Weaving Threads of Destiny (1987)
- Ernest Giles Reveals the Mystery of the Centre of Australia (1988)
- For Your Spare Moment: An Anthology (1990)
- Conservation for the Young and the Young in Heart (1991)
- Thinking into the future (1993)
