= The Best of Secter and the Rest of Secter =

2005 Canadian documentary film

- Film poster
- Directed by: Joel Secter
- Written by: Joel Secter
- Produced by: Joel Secter
- Starring: David Secter
- Cinematography: Paul Suderman
- Edited by: Michael Margolis
- Music by: Kaveh Nabatian
- Production company: Gwendolyn Pictures
- Release date: March 3, 2005 (NSI)
- Running time: 58 minutes
- Country: Canada
- Language: English

The Best of Secter and the Rest of Secter is a Canadian documentary film, directed by Joel Secter and released in 2005. The film centres on Joel Secter's uncle, filmmaker David Secter, particularly but not exclusively on the impact of his 1965 film Winter Kept Us Warm.

The film has its roots in the 1990s, when Joel Secter, who had not been in close contact with his uncle in many years and did not know that his uncle had directed films at all, unwittingly rented his uncle's 1976 sex comedy film Getting Together from a video store. Himself an aspiring filmmaker, he contacted his uncle, and the two collaborated as producers on the 1999 sex comedy film Cyberdorm, although the film was not successful. With even Secter's historically significant Winter Kept Us Warm nearly forgotten by the early 2000s, the two then collaborated on the documentary film, which explored both Secter's early success and his subsequent decision to join a bohemian artists' commune in New York City, where he virtually abandoned filmmaking. In his book Romance of Transgression in Canada: Queering Sexualities, Nations, Cinemas, Thomas Waugh wrote that the film "fills in the gaps in the subsequent career of a cinematic and sexual rebel whose artistic promise was not to be fully realized."

Notable figures who discussed Secter and Winter Kept Us Warm in the documentary included David Cronenberg, Michael Ondaatje, Philip Glass, Ed Mirvish, Joy Fielding and Lloyd Kaufman.

The film premiered at the National Screen Institute's FilmExchange festival in Winnipeg, Manitoba in March 2005, and received its first widespread coverage when it screened at the Inside Out Film and Video Festival in Toronto, Ontario in May. The film won the award for Best Documentary Film at the 2005 Whistler Film Festival.
