= Ruby Ginner =

British dancer and dance educator (1886–1978)

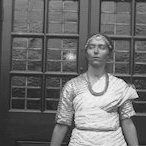
- at the Women's Freedom League in 1912 (by Christina Broom)
- Born: 8 May 1886; Cannes, France
- Died: 13 February 1978 (aged 91); Newbury, Berkshire, UK
- Other name: Ruby Ginner Dyer (after marriage)
- Occupations: Dancer, dance educator
- Relatives: Charles Ginner (brother)

Ruby Ginner (8 May 1886 – 13 February 1978), later Ruby Ginner Dyer, was a British dancer and dance educator, born in France. She founded a dance school, and the Association of Teachers of the Revived Greek Dance.

== Early life ==
Ruby Mary Adeline Ginner was born in Cannes, and moved to England at age 11. Her father Isaac Benjamin Ginner was a doctor. Her mother Lydia Adeline Wightman was born in Scotland. Her older brother Charles Ginner became a noted painter. She trained in ballet, and studied Greek dance.

== Career ==
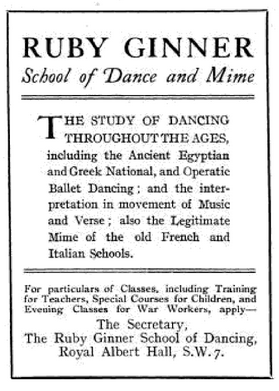
Advertisement transcribed: "Ruby Ginner School of Dance and Mime; The study of Dancing Throughout the Ages, including the Ancient Egyptian and Greek National, and Operatic Ballet Dancing; and the interpretation in movement of Music and Verse; also the Legitimate Mime of the old French and Italian Schools." Contact information at bottom. From a 1918 publication.

Ginner was principal dancer with the Beecham Opera Company from 1910 to 1912, then led a group of dancers performing her interpretation of Greek dance from 1913. She and her dance troupe performed at a fund raiser for the British Red Cross Society in 1915. She danced on the London stage, in An Autumn Idyll (1912), Et pois bonsoir (1920), The Trojan Women (1920), Medea (1920), and L'enfant prodigue (1929).

Ginner founded the Ruby Ginner School of Dance in London during World War I. She later partnered with mime Irene Mawer, and the school was known as the Ginner-Mawer School of Dance and Drama. Among her students was Australian health advocate Thea Stanley Hughes, Canadian dancer Gweneth Lloyd, actress and dancer Irene Mulvany-Gray (and her sister Hilda Mulvany-Gray) and dance educator Beatrice "Bice" Bellairs. She taught movement to actors at Constance Benson's studio, including a young John Gielgud.

In 1923, Ginner founded the Association of Teachers of the Revived Greek Dance; the organization became the Greek Dance Association, and in 1951 joined the Imperial Society of Teachers of Dancing. She was decorated for her services with the Red Cross in Greece during World War II.

Books by Ginner included The Revived Greek Dance: Its Art and Technique (1930) and Gateway to Dance (1960). Ginner offered Greek dance as a healthier, more natural way of expressive movement than more modern dance traditions:

The natural physical rhythms of mankind are being slowly crushed out of existence. In many of the arts and crafts, in the daily necessities of life, in labour, and in travel, the free, glorious, and rhythmic movement of the body has given place to the action of the machine.

== Personal life ==
Ruby Ginner married Alexander Dyer. They had a home called St Corentin, in Boscastle, Cornwall, where her brother painted landscapes from 1915 to 1947. Ginner died in 1978, aged 91 years, at a nursing home in Newbury. Her papers, including photographs and films, are in the National Resource Centre for Dance at the University of Surrey. The Ruby Ginner Awards are presented annually by the Imperial Society of Teachers of Dancing.
