= Between Friends (1973 film) =

1973 Canadian film

- Directed by: Donald Shebib
- Written by: Claude Harz
- Produced by: Chalmers Adams
- Starring: Michael Parks; Bonnie Bedelia; Chuck Shamata; Henry Beckman; Hugh Webster
- Cinematography: Richard Leiterman
- Edited by: Tony Lower; Donald Shebib
- Music by: Matthew McCauley
- Release date: 1 October 1973
- Running time: 91 minutes
- Country: Canada
- Language: English

Between Friends is a 1973 Canadian crime film directed by Donald Shebib. It was entered into the 23rd Berlin International Film Festival, and was featured in the Canadian Cinema television series which aired on CBC Television in 1974.

== Plot ==
A botched mine robbery in Northern Ontario involves the troubled quartet of Chino (Chuck Shamata), his American surfing buddy Toby (Michael Parks), his girlfriend's father (Henry Beckman) and Coker (Hugh Webster). While the robbery is being planned, Chino's girlfriend Ellie (Bonnie Bedelia) becomes attracted to Toby.

== Cast ==
- Michael Parks as Toby
- Bonnie Bedelia as Ellie
- Chuck Shamata as Chino
- Henry Beckman as Will
- Hugh Webster as Coker

== Reception ==
Though Between Friends was a commercial failure for director Shebib, it is "easily his most critically applauded film", some critics going so far as to call it his masterpiece. Wyndham Wise called it "a taut, serious dramatic study of loyalty, Canada/US relations and the limitations of male bonding", and asserted the failed heist sequence rivals any American film noir.

The film was a finalist for Best Picture at the Canadian Film Awards in 1973, losing to Slipstream.
