= Elsie Fogerty =

British teacher (1865–1945)

Elsie Fogerty CBE
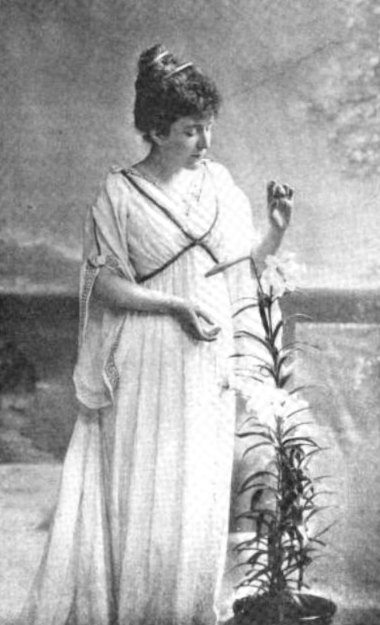
- In The Sketch, 21 September 1898
- Born: Anne Elizabeth Fogerty; 16 December 1865; Sydenham, London, England
- Died: 4 July 1945 (aged 79); Leamington Spa, Warwickshire, England
- Education: Paris Conservatoire
- Occupations: Teacher; dramatist
- Known for: Principal and founder of the Royal Central School of Speech and Drama

Anne Elizabeth "Elsie" Fogerty CBE (16 December 1865 – 4 July 1945) was a British teacher who departed from the customary practice of "voice and diction", also called elocution. At that time, "Voice and Diction" focused entirely on the mouth and nasal cavity to produce speech sounds. Fogerty's technique ended up focusing on the entire body and voice to produce speech. At first, she used just the lungs to resonate the sound, but soon included the whole body, because she discovered that posture and movement also affected speech. It ultimately became known as the "Body and Voice" technique. She was the founder and principal of the Central School of Speech and Drama in London from 1906 to 1942.

== Early years ==
Fogerty was born in Sydenham in south London on 16 December 1865. She was the daughter of engineer and architect Joseph Fogerty FRIBA (d. 1899) and his wife, Hannah Cochrane (d. 1910), both of Limerick.

An only child, Fogerty was privately educated and in 1883 trained at the Paris Conservatoire under Coquelin aine and Louis-Arsène Delaunay, and with Hermann Vezin in London. Fogerty went on to teach English and Elocution at the Crystal Palace School of Art and Literature from 1889, Roedean School from 1908 to 1937, and was tutor of diction at Sir Frank Benson's London School of Acting. From 1901 she adapted plays for amateur performance some of which were published, illustrated by Isabel Bonus.

== Central School of Speech and Drama ==
Fogerty began teaching Saturday speech classes at the Royal Albert Hall in the 1890s. Following their success, in 1906 she founded the Central School of Speech and Drama, then known as the Central School of Speech-Training and Dramatic Arts at the Hall. By 1908, she had worked out a three-year training course with speech trainers and drama teachers. In 1923, the school was one of three educational establishments approved by the University of London to grant diplomas in dramatic art. Fogerty gave university extension lectures at the Albert Hall, and for many years took evening classes for London County Council teachers.

The School remained at the Royal Albert Hall until 1957, when it moved to its current site in Swiss Cottage, north London.

Many of Fogerty's pupils had successes in the Poetry Reading Competition at Oxford before the Second World War, and many alumni went on to become teachers in speech and the management of theatres.

Whilst at the Royal Albert Hall, Elsie Fogerty trained notable actors including:

- Rodney Ackland
- Dame Peggy Ashcroft
- Iris Baker
- William Fox
- Sir John Gielgud
- John Laurie
- Alison Leggatt
- Ruth Lodge
- Irene Mawer
- Sir Laurence Olivier
- Frederick Piper
- Ann Todd
- Marda Vanne

Many public figures and actors consulted Fogerty on special difficulties connected with the speech side of their work, including poet Laurence Binyon, Elisabeth Bergner, Sarah Bernhardt, George Bernard Shaw, T. S. Eliot, various pillars of Church and State, and Princess Louise, who became Patron of the School.

== Speech Clinic, St Thomas' Hospital ==
Fogerty was a pioneer in the cure of stammering and in 1912 opened a speech clinic at St Thomas' Hospital, London, of which she became superintendent, and consequently one of the first speech therapists.

== Honours ==
Fogerty was appointed Commander of the Order of the British Empire (CBE) in the 1934 Birthday Honours for services to speech training and dramatic arts.

== Drama profession ==
Elsie Fogerty worked to secure the first recognition of drama as a diploma subject in an English university – the University of London, where she was a member of the advisory committee for the Diploma in Dramatic Art. She was a member of the Council of the British Drama League from its foundation until her death, and was a keen supporter of the establishment of the Royal National Theatre, London.

== Publications ==
=== Plays ===
- Tennyson's Princess, Elsie Fogerty (1901 Swann Sonnenschein & Co)
- The Queen's Jest, Elsie Fogerty (1908 Swann Sonnenschein &co)
- The Antigone of Sophocles, Elsie Fogerty (1908 Swann Sonnenschein & Co)
- Shakespeare's Twelfth Night, Elsie Fogerty (1911 Swann Sonnenschein & Co)
- Euripide's Alkestis, Elsie Fogerty (1924 Swann Sonnenschein & Co)

=== Non-fiction ===
- Notes on Speech Training, Elsie Fogerty (1918)
- The Speaking of English Verse, Elsie Fogerty (J M Dent & Sons, Limited, 1923)
- Stammering, Elsie Fogerty (Allen & Unwin, 1930)
- Rhythm, Elsie Fogerty (G Allen & Unwin, Limited, 1937)
- Art of the Actor, Coquelin, trans. Elsie Fogerty (G Allen & Unwin, Limited)

== Later years ==
Fogerty never married but devoted her entire life to her work. In 1944, her flat in South Kensington, London was completely destroyed following an air raid during the Second World War. With all of her possessions destroyed, she moved into a nearby hotel. Fogerty died in 1945 in a nursing home at Leamington Spa.
