= Paul Almond =

Canadian director (1931–2015)

Paul Almond OC RCA
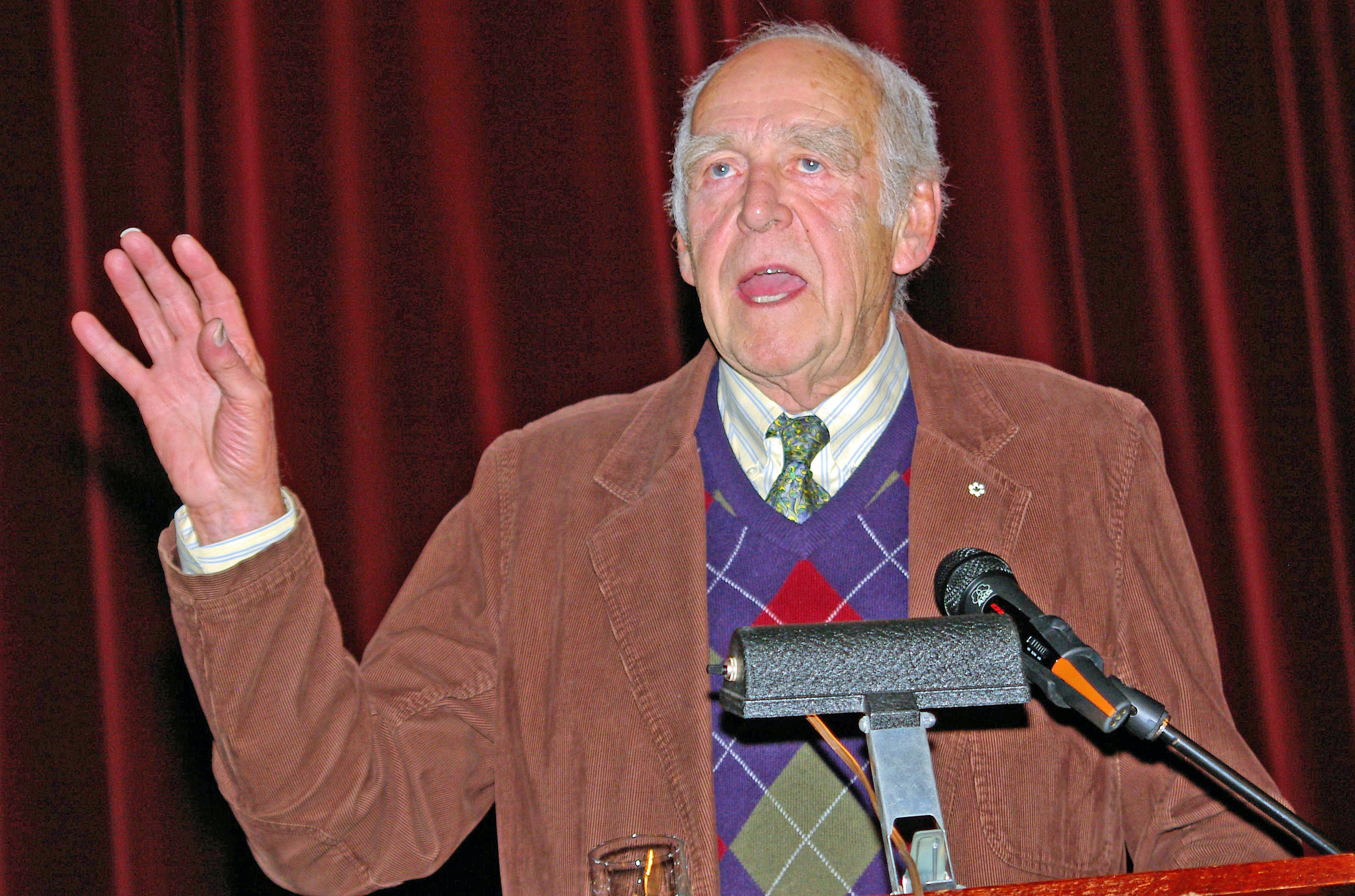
- Almond at Victoria Hall in Westmount, Quebec
- Born: April 26, 1931; Montreal, Quebec, Canada
- Died: April 9, 2015 (aged 83); Malibu, California, U.S.
- Occupations: Novelist; film director; film producer; screenwriter
- Years active: 1955–1992
- Spouses: Angela Leigh (m. 1957; div. 1964) Geneviève Bujold (m. 1967; div. 1974) Joan Harwood Elkins (m. 1976)
- Children: 1
- Parent: Rene Almond

Paul Almond (April 26, 1931 – April 9, 2015) was a Canadian television and motion picture screenwriter, director, producer, and novelist. He is known for being the director of the first film in the Up series.

== Life and career ==
Paul Almond was born to Rene Almond and Eric Almond. He attended Bishop's College School, McGill University and Balliol College, Oxford University, where he read Philosophy, Politics, Economics; edited the University magazine, Isis; played for the Oxford University Ice Hockey Club; and served as president of the university Poetry Society.

At the Canadian Broadcasting Corporation, he worked primarily as a director and producer, and also wrote several scripts. He did similar work in England for the BBC, ABC Weekend TV, and Granada TV, where he created the ground-breaking documentary Seven Up!, before embarking on a career as a feature-length film-maker.

In the late 1960s, he attempted to establish a high quality Canadian art cinema with his understated and highly interiorized films Isabel (1968), The Act of the Heart (1970) and Journey (1972), featuring his wife at the time, actress Geneviève Bujold. These films met some critical resistance in Canada, but the trilogy was Almond's most ambitious work and a distinctive contribution to Canadian film.

After an absence from filmmaking of almost a decade, Almond directed three more films: Ups and Downs (1983); Captive Hearts (1987); and The Dance Goes On (1991), featuring Bujold and their son Matthew Almond.

In addition to his television and film work, Almond also produced and directed several plays for television by such authors as Henrik Ibsen, Tennessee Williams, Harold Pinter, William Shakespeare, as well as creating his own adaptations of works by Jane Austen, Emily Brontë, Henry James, Somerset Maugham, among others.

In later years, Almond authored eight novels in the Alford Saga. The final novel is titled The Inheritor, a stand-alone autobiographical roman à clef about the remarkable life, loves, agonies, achievements and awards of a prestigious Canadian movie producer, director, and author. It was published in April 2015 by Red Deer Press.

Almond was appointed an Officer of the Order of Canada in 2001, and given a Lifetime Achievement Award by the Directors Guild of Canada in 2007. He was a member of the Royal Canadian Academy of Arts.

Almond was first married to National Ballet of Canada leading dancer Angela Leigh, then to Geneviève Bujold from 1967 to 1974. Their son, Matthew James Almond, was born in 1968. In 1976 he married photographer Joan Harwood Elkins.

Almond maintained a home in Malibu, California, in addition to the Almond hereditary family farm in Shigawake, Quebec.

Almond died on April 9, 2015, in Beverly Hills, California, of cardiac problems from which he had suffered for several years.

== Filmography ==
- Macbeth (1961)
- Backfire! (1962)
- October Beach (1964)
- Seven Up! (1964)
- Isabel (1968), (Isabel was a box office success and won four Etrogs at the 1968 Canadian Film Awards, and Almond was nominated as best director of the year by the Directors Guild of America.)
- The Act of the Heart (1970), (Canadian Film Award for Best Director. The Act of the Heart won five Canadian Film Awards in 1970.)
- Journey (1972)
- Every Person Is Guilty (1979)
- Final Assignment (1980)
- Ups and Downs (1983)
- Captive Hearts (1987)
- The Dance Goes On / Le Temps retrouvé (1992)

== Bibliography ==
=== Novels ===
- La Vengeance des Dieux (Art Global Publishers, 1999)

The Alford Saga:

- The Deserter (McArthur & Co, 2010)
- The Survivor (McArthur & Co, 2011)
- The Pioneer (McArthur & Co, 2012)
- The Pilgrim (McArthur & Co, 2012)
- Le Déserteur (Quebec-Amerique, 2013)
- The Chaplain (Sulby Hall Publishers, 2013)
- Le Défricheur (Quebec-Amerique, 2013)
- The Gunner (Red Deer Press, 2014)
- Les Bâtisseurs (Quebec-Amerique, 2014)
- The Hero (Red Deer Press, 2014)
- The Inheritor (Red Deer Press, 2015)

=== Biography ===
- High Hopes: Coming of Age in the mid-Century (ECW Press, 1999)(with Michael Ballantyne)
- The Inheritor (Red Deer Press, 2015. Released in April 2015 by Red Deer Press as the eighth and final novel in the Alford Saga, The Inheritor is a stand-alone autobiographical roman à clef about the remarkable life, loves, agonies and achievements of one of Canada's most distinguished film and television producer-directors)

== See also ==
- List of Bishop's College School alumni
