= Üç Korkusuz Arkadaş =

- Directed by: Halit Refiğ
- Starring: Tanju Gürsu, Nilüfer Aydan and Kuzey Vargin
- Release date: 1966
- Country: Turkey
- Language: Turkish

Üç Korkusuz Arkadaş is a 1966 Turkish war drama film, directed by Halit Refiğ and starring Tanju Gürsu, Nilüfer Aydan and Kuzey Vargin.
