= 1982 Dora Mavor Moore Awards =

The 1982 Dora Mavor Moore Awards celebrated excellence in theatre from the Toronto Alliance for the Performing Arts.

== Winners and nominees ==
=== General Theatre Division ===
Production	Original Play
Tamara – Tamara International and Necessary Angel; Dreaming and Duelling – Shaw Festival and Young People's Theatre; Night and Day – Toronto Free Theatre; Blind Dancers and Straight Ahead – Toronto Free Theatre	Tamara by John Krizanc – Tamara International and Necessary Angel; Clay by Lawrence Jeffery – Factory Theatre; The Passing Scene by Erika Ritter – Tarragon Theatre; White Boys by Tom Walmsley – Tarragon Theatre
Leading Actor	Leading Actress
John Evans for True West – Phoenix Theatre; Geordie Johnson for Lone Star; Douglas Rain for Bodies; Larry Reynolds for Rexy – CentreStage Theatre	Rosemary Dunsmore for Blind Dancers and Straight Ahead – Toronto Free Theatre; Clare Coulter for Blood Relations – Tarragon Theatre; Jennifer Phipps for Filumena – Theatre Plus; Fiona Reid for Night and Day – Toronto Free Theatre
Supporting Actor	Supporting Actress
Gregory Ellwand for Night and Day – Toronto Free Theatre; Layne Coleman for The Al Cornell Story – Theatre Passe Muraille; Allen Doremus for Rexy – CentreStage Theatre; Brian Taylor for Filumena – Theatre Plus	Mary Ann McDonald for The Al Cornell Story – Theatre Passe Muraille; Maggie Huculak for Tamara – Tamara International and Necessary Angel; Tanja Jacobs for Three Sisters; Nancy Palk for Clay – Factory Theatre; Shelley Thompson for Tamara – Tamara International and Necessary Angel
Direction	Scenic Design
Richard Rose for Tamara – Tamara International and Necessary Angel; Jim Garrard for Cold Comfort – Theatre Passe Muraille; Guy Sprung for Night and Day – Toronto Free Theatre; Henry Tarvainen for Blind Dancers and Straight Ahead – Toronto Free Theatre	Dorian L. Clark for Tamara – Tamara International and Necessary Angel; Jim Garrard for Cold Comfort – Theatre Passe Muraille; Sue LePage for Swipe – NDWT; James Plaxton for Picnic in the Drift – Harbourfront Centre
Costume Design	Lighting Design
Linda Muir for Tamara – Tamara International and Necessary Angel; Meredith Caron for The Saga of Wet Hens – Tarragon Theatre; Peter Hartwell for Night and Day – Toronto Free Theatre; John Pennoyer for Beauty and the Beast – Young People's Theatre	Harry Frehner for Dreaming and Duelling – Shaw Festival and Young People's Theatre; Tim Fort for Betrayal; Peter Smith for Night and Day – Toronto Free Theatre; Robert Thomson for Swipe – NDWT

=== Musical Theatre or Revue Division ===
Production	Original Musical
Man of La Mancha – Errant Productions; Nion and Company – Derido Productions; To Mock a Kilogram – Second City	Rock and Roll by John Gray – Young People's Theatre; Songs from the Front and Rear by Patrick Rose – Schwarz/Sewell Productions; To Mock a Kilogram by John Hemphill, Ken Innes, Deborah Kimmett, Don Lake, Kathy Laskey and Derek McGrath – Second City
Actor	Actress
Page Fletcher for Rock and Roll – Young People's Theatre; Derek McGrath for To Mock a Kilogram – Second City; Ian Wallace for Nion and Company – Derido Productions	Kathy Michael McGlynn for Piaf: Her Songs, Her Loves – Royal Alexander Theatre; Susan Cuthbert for Dames at Sea; Christina Frolick for Rose-Marie
Direction	Scenic Design
John Gray for Rock and Roll – Young People's Theatre; Michael J. Gellman for To Mock a Kilogram – Second City; Richard Pochinko for Nion and Company – Derido Productions	Antonin Dimitrov for Man of La Mancha – Errant Productions; Allan Stichbury for Piaf: Her Songs, Her Loves – Royal Alexander Theatre; Ian Wallace for Nion and Company – Derido Productions
Costume Design	Lighting Design
Olga Dimitrov for Man of La Mancha – Errant Productions; Janice Lindsay for The Threepenny Opera – Young People's Theatre; Ian Wallace for Nion and Company – Derido Productions	Nick Cernovitch for Rock and Roll – Young People's Theatre; Tim Crack for Piaf: Her Songs, Her Loves – Royal Alexander Theatre; David Wallett for Man of La Mancha – Errant Productions
Musical Direction	Choreography
Bob Ashley for Piaf: Her Songs, Her Loves – Royal Alexander Theatre; Laura Burton and Berthold Carrière for Man of La Mancha – Errant Productions; Ed Henderson for Songmakers – Variety Dinner Theatre	Page Fletcher for Rock and Roll – Young People's Theatre; Derek McGrath for To Mock a Kilogram – Second City; Ian Wallace for Nion and Company – Derido Productions

== See also ==
- 36th Tony Awards
- 1982 Laurence Olivier Awards
