= John Labow =

Canadian film and television producer

- Born: John Avery Leon Labow; November 28, 1942; Timmins, Ontario, Canada
- Died: December 11, 2017 (aged 75); Calgary, Alberta, Canada
- Education: University College, Toronto
- Occupations: documentary filmmaker and producer

John Avery Leon Labow (November 28, 1942 – December 11, 2017) was a Canadian film and television producer, most noted as a producer of documentaries for TVOntario.

Born in Timmins, Ontario, Labow was educated at University College, University of Toronto. His artistic endeavours during this era included performing as a folk music duo with Bram Morrison, and acting in local and regional theatre productions and the 1965 student-produced film Winter Kept Us Warm. He was then one of the producers of The Offering, the second feature film by Winter Kept Us Warm director David Secter.

Following his graduation he worked for the Canadian Broadcasting Corporation, before joining the nascent TVOntario in the early 1970s as one of its founding producers. For TVOntario he produced a significant number of documentary films and series, most notably the Planet Africa series about contemporary African culture. He later left TVOntario to launch his own independent production company, Videolink, and in the early 2000s he moved to Calgary, Alberta, where he launched another new company, Agora Productions. As an independent producer, he primarily concentrated on television specials for musical performers such as Anne Murray, Perry Como and the Toronto Symphony Orchestra; he also worked as a casting director through his independent firm Canadian Casting Centre.

He died on December 11, 2017, in Calgary, at age 75.
