= Kiss Mommy Goodbye =

1981 novel by Joy Fielding

- Author: Joy Fielding
- Language: English
- Pages: 374
- ISBN: 9780786756179

Kiss Mommy Goodbye is a 1981 psychological thriller novel by Joy Fielding.

== Plot ==
This novel concerns kidnappings by parents who did not get custody of their children.

Donna Cressy loves her husband Victor but the love soon turns to hate when Victor starts mentally harassing her. This causes her to behave oddly owing to her trauma, and during the divorce proceedings a number of people testify that she had behaved unusually since she married Victor. However, she manages to get custody of their children Adam and Sharon. Victor is allowed weekend visits.

Donna moves in with her boyfriend Dr. Segal and his daughter Annie. One day Victor arrives and on the pretext of a weekend visit, he takes Adam and Sharon away. Donna spirals into depression and begins to behave oddly again. Just when she's given up hope, she gets a telephone call from Victor, which she traces to California. When she finally finds the children, Victor almost kills them. However, with the help of Dr. Segal, she is able to get her children back and survive.
