= Elton Hayes =

British actor and guitarist (1915–2001)

Cover of E.P., 1959

Elton Hayes (16 February 1915 – 23 September 2001) was a British actor and guitarist.

== Life and career ==
Elton Hayes was born in Bletchley, Buckinghamshire, England. Both his parents were actors, and he made his first stage appearance aged nine. He also wanted to be an actor and he learned the violin and the ukulele. As a teenager he won a scholarship to the Fay Compton School of Dramatic Arts where he received an extensive theatrical education. His first job was as assistant stage manager with the Old Stagers' Company at the Canterbury Theatre. He sang in his spare time at local social clubs.

Hayes took up the guitar shortly before World War II when he accepted one as security from a friend who had borrowed 30 shillings. Guitars brought him fame later, accompanying his old English folk songs and ballads.

In 1939 he volunteered for military service and was commissioned in the Royal West Kent Regiment and posted to India. After the Japanese surrender he hitch-hiked to Bombay where he was appointed Officer Commanding ENSA in Rawalpindi. Despite contracting rheumatic fever, which caused his fingers to stiffen, he continued playing.

A few days after returning to Britain he visited the BBC, still in uniform, to watch a broadcast of Children's Hour and was immediately taken on to write and perform musical versions of Edward Lear's Nonsense Rhymes. This was followed in 1946 by a regular slot on the BBC Radio show In Town Tonight. From then on he performed on radio and television frequently in Britain. On an eight-week tour of North America he made 113 appearances. As an actor, he appeared in The Beaux' Stratagem at the Lyric Theatre for 18 months from 1949.

His fame was extended by his appearance as the minstrel Alan-a-Dale in the 1952 Walt Disney film The Story of Robin Hood and His Merrie Men, in which he was afforded a musical number, "Whistle, my Love". Long afterwards his own "Robin Hood Ballads" were used in another Disney feature; Enchanted.

His recording of the Victor Hely-Hutchinson setting of Edward Lear's "The Owl and the Pussycat" also achieved enduring popularity. It was first issued as a 10-inch single by Parlophone in June 1953, and was regularly requested on the BBC radio programme Children's Favourites, as was "The Whistling Gypsy". "The Owl and the Pussycat" was one of six song recordings he made of Edward Lear's nonsense verse following his BBC performances, along with the Dudley Glass settings of "The Duck and the Kangaroo", "The Table and the Chair", "The Broom, the Shovel, the Poker and the Tongs", "The Jumblies" and "The Quangle-Wangle's Hat". These were issued on a Parlophone extended play 45 single in November 1955

Later he had his own television shows, called "Elton Hayes - He Sings to a Small Guitar", "Close Your Eyes" and "Tinker's Tales". He obtained a follow-up film role in The Black Knight, 1954, a variation on the King Arthur story produced by Irving Allen and Albert 'Cubby' Broccoli and starring Alan Ladd. He can be seen very briefly at the start of the film as a minstrel singing a few bars of "The Whistling Gypsy/The Gypsy Rover".

Hayes was nervous before live performances and retired from show business in the 1960s. He bought a small, thatched cottage on the Essex-Suffolk border and, after studying at a local agricultural college, became a farmer, breeding pedigree livestock. He took up carriage driving and became a member of the British Driving Society.

== Personal life ==
Betty Inman, whom he married in 1942, died in 1982. After a stroke in 1995, Hayes gave up his farm and moved to Bury St Edmunds to live with friends who cared for him until his death in 2001.

== Filmography ==
- 1948 A Date with a Dream as Singer
- 1952 The Story of Robin Hood and His Merrie Men as Allan-a-Dale
- 1954 The Black Knight as The Minstrel
- 1968 Isabel as Eb
- 1972 Journey as Piers, The Farmer
- 1992 The Dance Goes On as Mayor Elton
