= Canadian Cinema =

1974 Canadian television series

- Genre: Feature film
- Country of origin: Canada
- Original language: English
- No. of seasons: 1

Production
- Running time: 120 minutes

Original release
- Network: CBC Television
- Release: 21 July – 25 August 1974

Canadian Cinema is a Canadian film presentation television series that aired on CBC Television in 1974.

== Premise ==
Feature films from Canada were presented in this series:

- 21 July: The Rowdyman (1972)
- 28 July: Journey (1972)
- 4 August: Mon oncle Antoine (1971)
- 11 August: Between Friends (1973)
- 18 August: Isabel (1968)
- 25 August: The Visitor (1974)

== Scheduling ==
This series was broadcast in a two-hour time slot on Sundays at 9:00 p.m. (Eastern) from 21 July to 25 August 1974.
