= The Rowdyman =

- Directed by: Peter Carter
- Written by: Gordon Pinsent
- Produced by: Lawrence Dane
- Starring: Gordon Pinsent; Will Geer; Frank Converse; Linda Goranson
- Cinematography: Edmund Long
- Edited by: Michael Manne
- Music by: Ben McPeek
- Distributed by: Crawley Films
- Release dates: May 18, 1972 (Canada); July 1973 (U.S.)
- Running time: 95 minutes
- Country: Canada
- Language: English
- Budget: $350,000

The Rowdyman is a 1972 comedy film with moralistic overtones, set in Newfoundland. It was written by and starred native Newfoundlander Gordon Pinsent.

The film is about Will Cole (Pinsent). In his thirties, he doesn't take life seriously, but his antics bring pain and tragic consequences to friends and family. He is sexually liberated and has sex with a stranger (Dawn Greenhalgh) on a train and his carelessness at work causes pain for his best friend and co-worker (Frank Converse).

== Production ==
The film had a budget of $350,000 (equivalent to $2,624,201 in 2025).

== Reception ==
Pinsent won the Canadian Film Award for Best Actor at the 24th Canadian Film Awards in 1972. The film was also nominated for Best Picture. Pinsent also won the Earle Grey Award for Best Actor at the 2nd ACTRA Awards.

It was featured in the Canadian Cinema television series which aired on CBC Television in 1974. It was later screened at the 1984 Festival of Festivals as part of Front & Centre, a special retrospective program of artistically and culturally significant films from throughout the history of Canadian cinema.

== Works cited ==
- Melnyk, George (2004). One Hundred Years of Canadian Cinema. University of Toronto Press. ISBN 080203568X.
