= Bus Riley's Back in Town =

1965 film by Harvey Hart

- Directed by: Harvey Hart
- Written by: William Inge credited as Walter Gage
- Produced by: Elliott Kastner
- Starring: Ann-Margret; Michael Parks; Janet Margolin; Brad Dexter; Kim Darby; Jocelyn Brando; Larry Storch
- Cinematography: Russell Metty
- Edited by: Folmar Blangsted
- Music by: Richard Markowitz
- Production company: Universal Pictures
- Distributed by: Universal Pictures
- Release date: 1965
- Running time: 93 minutes
- Country: United States
- Language: English

Bus Riley's Back in Town is a 1965 American drama film written by William Inge, directed by Harvey Hart, and starring Ann-Margret, Michael Parks, Janet Margolin, Brad Dexter, Kim Darby, Jocelyn Brando and Larry Storch.

Inge was unhappy with changes that were made to his script and had his name removed from the credits, replacing it with the name Walter Gage.

== Plot ==
After three years in the Navy, Bus Riley returns to his hometown, moves back in with his mother and sisters, and begins trying to make a life for himself. He suffers a series of personal and career disappointments. Riley is a highly skilled mechanic, but resists suggestions that he work for the local garage and attend college at night, as he aspires to a career he considers more respectable and prestigious.

Riley discovers that an older male friend who has promised him a mortician's job wants a live-in sexual relationship as part of the bargain; disillusioned, Riley rejects the offer. He takes a job as a door-to-door vacuum cleaner salesman, but ends up fending off advances from lonely housewives. To compound his unhappiness, Riley learns that his beautiful but shallow girlfriend Laurel has married a wealthy older man in his absence. Bored with her society life, Laurel dives fully clothed into the swimming pool at her home one night, and by showing how her wet clothing has molded itself to her breasts lures Riley into having an affair with her against his better judgment.

Judy, a family friend, loses her mother and her home in a fire, leading to a romance with Riley that gives him hope for the future. He takes the garage job. After his sisters and mother learn of his affair with Laurel and confront him, Riley realizes he does not love the selfish and manipulative Laurel and breaks up with her for good, regaining the self-confidence to be proud of his work at the garage.

== Cast ==
- Ann-Margret as Laurel
- Michael Parks as "Bus" Riley
- Janet Margolin as Judith
- Brad Dexter as Slocum
- Jocelyn Brando as Mrs. Riley
- Larry Storch as Howie
- Crahan Denton as Spencer
- Kim Darby as "Gussie"
- Brett Somers as Carlotta
- Mimsy Farmer as Paula
- Nan Martin as Mrs. Nichols
- Ethel Griffies as Mrs. Spencer
- Alice Pearce as Housewife
- David Carradine as "Stretch"
- Parley Baer as Jules Griswald
- Marc Cavell as Egg Foo

== Production ==
The production started as a one-act play by Inge. It was produced at Pennsylvania State University in 1958, and he then set about expanding it. In 1962, he said, "Right now it's in a formless stage, half movie, half play. I intend to make it into a play. It's about a success symbol of today – a young movie actor returning to his home town. It deals with some of the forces in his life that compelled his drive for success and that made success a necessity for his survival. It is not based on any particular person. It's more of a composite portrait." It was originally known as All Kinds of People. Parks was cast off the back of his work in Wild Seed.

Ann-Margaret told film critic Gordon Grow from Films and Filming that her part in the film had been extensively edited, and she was disappointed the original version was never seen, she explained:

You should have seen the film we shot originally. After the alterations were made, William Inge had his name taken off it. His screenplay had been wonderful. So brutally honest. And the woman Laurel, as he wrote her, was mean, and he made that very sad. But the studio at the time didn't want me to have that kind of an image for the young people of America. They thought it was too brutal a portrayal. It had been filmed entirely, using William Inge's script, but a year after it was completed they got another writer in, and another director. They wanted me to re-do five key scenes. And those scenes changed the story. That's when Inge took his name off. There were two of those scenes that I just refused to do. The other three I did, but I was upset and angry. They'd altered the whole life of the story and made the character I played another person altogether.

According to American film historian James Robert Parish, plot changes to the movie were made at the insistence of Ann-Margaret. Parish explained the changes were made because she wanted to "be made the movie's focal point instead of newcomer Michael Parks." And when Inge found out about it, he "was so disgusted with the end results", he demanded his name be removed from the credits, and instead, the pseudonym Walter Gage was substituted for the screenwriter. Parish also noted that the movie turned out to be a box-office flop.

The director, Harvey Hart, recalls that the movie was "butchered' because after a sneak preview in a big theatre, at which handed out questionnaire cards were handed out, the audience members who had been invited to the screening were saying "idiotic things on the cards." He went on to say the movie was "absolutely butchered because of those cards." He also criticized the studio executives for acting "like children", for even paying attention to the negative opinions on the questionnaire cards, instead of having an opinion for themselves.

== Reception ==
Film critic Stephen Vagg argued in FilmInk that parts of the film "are actually effective, but this was made at Universal who, as in Kitten with a Whip, did it on the cheap; films like this need to be done with more care and money – or a better director than Harvey Hart, who was fine, but no Elia Kazan. Inge took his name off the movie after additional footage was shot involving Ann-Margret. Looking at the film today, there was nothing wrong with giving her character more screen time, it’s just that it was done badly."

Film critic Phillip K. Scheuer wrote "Ann-Margaret makes much of her role of the overblown sexpot, and while she has the equipment for it; the character falls incredibly close to caricature." He further noted that "the two teenagers, are breaths of fresh air by comparison." Variety Magazine wrote, "where to pinpoint the blame for this well-intended major feature's failure is difficult; certainly some of it must be allotted to the director's inexperience with the bigger-screen medium, and his lack of control over several of the thespians involved, but the erratic, chopped-up screenplay is also a major fault."

Film historian Vito Russo opined that "America's obsession with defining homosexuality contrasted sharply with more human exercises from Europe." He argues that in American cinema "the discovery of a character's homosexuality came most often as the shock of seeing the familiar – suddenly turn alien; Bus Riley's Back in Town contains this kind of lurking, sex-defined creature; a lecherous old undertaker puts his hand on the knee of all-American sailor boy Michael Parks who flees when he sees the face of the demon."

British film critic John Gillett wrote that this film "is frankly, a bit of a mess, though worth looking at because its young director has tried to do something with it and something of this does come through." He also noted that while Michael Parks is "handsome. likeable and relaxed, he comes off as a little too method-bound." Film critic Howard Thompson praised the movie, writing; "this lowkeyed drama of a young Navy veteran's search for self-fulfillment is so honest, sensitive and thoughtful on several levels that not even Ann-Margret's blatant, cooing portrait of a siren can ruin it." He further stated that "somebody's typewriter rates respect for blueprinting a slice of small-town Americana that remains head and shoulders above many synthetic predecessors."

== See also ==
- List of American films of 1965
- List of LGBTQ-related films of 1965
