= Haremde Dört Kadın =

1965 Turkish film

- Directed by: Halit Refiğ
- Screenplay by: Halit Refiğ; Kemal Tahir
- Produced by: Nüzhet Birsel; Özdemir Birsel
- Starring: Tanju Gürsu; Cahide Sonku; Münir Nurettin Selçuk; Cahit Irgat; Yılmaz Güney
- Cinematography: Mike Rafaelyan; Memduh Yükman
- Edited by: Özdemir Aritan
- Production company: Birsel Film
- Release date: 1965
- Country: Turkey
- Language: Turkish

Haremde Dört Kadın (translation: Four Women in the Harem) is a 1965 Turkish drama film, directed by Halit Refiğ and starring Tanju Gürsu, Cahide Sonku, Münir Nurettin Selçuk, Cahit Irgat, Yılmaz Güney and Cüneyt Arkın. The movie was written by Refiğ and Kemal Tahir. The film was heavily criticized at the time for its portrayal of lesbianism.

== Plot ==
The movie is set in 1899, during the final years of the Ottoman Empire. Sadık Pasha, who is loyal to the Sultan, resides in a mansion with his three wives: Şevkidil, Mihrengiz, and Gülfem. Pasha's two nephews Rüştü and Cemal; and an orphan named Ruşan also live in the mansion. Pasha is disappointed that he does not have an heir yet, so he decides to take Ruşan as his fourth wife. The other three wives are frustrated with this new development and tension builds because they fear that Ruşan may be the one who gives birth to the son Pasha longs for.

In addition, several of his wives are having sexual relations with Rüştü, in an attempt to get pregnant, as it is widely known in the mansion, that Pasha is infertile, and the lineage of the child doesn't really matter, because no matter who has the child; it holds a significant advantage for both Pasha and the mother. There are also several instances of intimacy between Şevkidil, the oldest wife, and Mihrengiz, the second wife.

While the mansion is preparing for the wedding between Pasha and Ruşan; we are introduced to Nizamettin Pasha, who is a fierce rival of Pasha. One night, one of Nizamettin Pasha's men shoots a friend of Cemal's from medical school, who is a member of the Young Turk movement, alongside Cemal. Seeking shelter, the friend goes to the mansion, and Cemal hides him in the harem. It's not long before Pasha discovers the hiding friend, and banishes both him and his nephew Cemal from the mansion.

The house is now being run by Pasha's nephew, Rüştü, who has been secretly plotting with Nizamettin Pasha's men against his uncle in order to seize his wealth and harem. At midnight on New Year's Eve, when Pasha is about to marry Ruşan, Rüştü opens the gates of the mansion to Nizamettin Pasha's men, and there is a confrontation that ends in a shootout. After Pasha discovers the conspiracy, he kills his nephew Rüştü, who betrayed him. Cemal, who had returned during the shootout, helps his uncle defeat Nizamettin Pasha's men. During the confusion in the shootout, Ruşan has fled the mansion so she can be with Cemal, who she has secretly been having a relationship with. However, Mihrengiz, one of Pasha's wives, and Cemal's ex-lover, kills Cemal on his way to Ruşan. The film ends with Ruşan alone, waiting for Cemal in the woods in the darkness.

== Cast ==
- Tanju Gürsu
- Cahide Sonku
- Münir Nurettin Selçuk
- Cahit Irgat
- Yılmaz Güney
- Cüneyt Arkın
- Hulusi Kentmen
- Nubar Terziyan
- Münir Özkul
- Cüneyt Arkın
- Eşref Kolçak
- Erol Taş
- Muzaffer Tema
- Fatma Girik
- Sadri Alışık
- Türkan Şoray
- Filiz Akın
- Ediz Hun

== Release ==
When the film was released in Turkey, it was not popular and did not achieve any commercial success. In 1966, about ten minutes after it had started a screening at the Antalya Film Festival, a group of conservative audience members, stormed into the projection room and destroyed the film. In 1974, the film was broadcast on Turkish State Television, and political controversy still followed the film as conservative party members wanted to punish the television executives who had allowed the broadcasting of the film on state television. It was only after private broadcasting began in Turkey during the 1990s that the film could be shown on different television channels without any problems.

== Critical analysis ==
Alperen Cevirme of The Asian Cut wrote that the director illustrates with the film that "love and affection between individuals of the same sex is neither abnormal nor a Western invention, but rather something that has always been within Ottoman society; the relative lack of representation of such relationships is not due to their rarity, but rather because they often occur behind closed doors, away from public view; and yet, similar to any other society, love and affection between individuals of the same sex persisted in the Ottoman Empire and continues to exist in the Republic of Turkey."

Dinc and Asker of the Journal of Film and Video opined that "the film contains several allusions to the contemporary debates on Turkish cinema and society. It deals with an old, traditional institution, the harem in its last decades, at a time when great social transformations were taking place due to the modernization efforts within the Ottoman Empire." They go on to argue that the movie also "focuses on the basic unit of Ottoman society, the family, by illustrating the negative effects of social change on traditional culture, in particular, on the individual characters within an extended family and their social relationships. The historical perspective of the film allows Refiğ not only to look at the roots of the distinctions, conflicts, and contradictions between Western and Turkish society, which he believes originated in the past, but also to talk about the present-day problems concerning Westernization in contemporary Turkey."

== See also ==
- Cinema of Turkey
- List of LGBTQ-related films of 1965
