= The Radio Show =

- Genre: Talk show
- Country of origin: Canada
- Home station: CBC Radio
- Hosted by: Jack Farr
- Recording studio: Winnipeg, Manitoba
- Original release: April 23, 1983 – June 27, 1992

The Radio Show was a Canadian radio show, which aired on CBC Radio from 1983 to 1992. The show incorporated some aspects of a conventional radio talk show, filtered through the warped comedic sensibilities of host Jack Farr. The program, described by some critics as an "electronic pub" or a "radio chautauqua", had as its core philosophy the provision of light entertainment for people who suffered from "information overload" during the week.

Premiering on April 23, 1983, as a summer replacement for the network's Metropolitan Opera broadcasts, the show aired on Saturday afternoons. By its third season, the program was airing throughout the year.

== Content ==
The show was noted particularly for Farr's irreverent and surreal humour. He billed himself as "Captain Radio" and "The Prairie Groovemaster", regularly claimed that his program was being "pirated by a prestigious New York-based show" which he never named, and made exaggerated claims about the size of his radio audience; the number increased each week throughout the show's run, and by the time the show ended in 1992, he was claiming to have two billion listeners worldwide.

Guests were interviewed on offbeat topics, such as champion pumpkin growers, doormen to royalty, people reporting attacks by wild cows, and inventors of new gadgets of varying usability. Ongoing stories included claimed attempts to locate the stolen brain of Albert Einstein and the missing Last Spike, and coverage of the cancellation of Christmas because Santa Claus was on strike.

Regular contributors to the show included Allan Fotheringham as a political commentator, Bill Casselman as a columnist on words and language, Danny Finkleman as a financial correspondent, Joy Fielding as a book reviewer, Mary Ambrose as a television critic, Peter Jordan as a "know-it-all", Stan Fischler as a hockey commentator, and Jon Ljungberg (billed as Elvis Presley) as a travel and Olympics correspondent. Impressionists Bob Robertson and Linda Cullen, who would later be given their own CBC Radio show as Double Exposure, got their start as contributors of comedic sketches to the program; comedy musical group The Arrogant Worms also gained their first national exposure as contributors of comedic songs to The Radio Show.

In a column upon the show's cancellation, The Globe and Mail critic John Doyle lauded Farr's "haute hoser" aesthetic, singling out "dog-bark operas, dust-bunny sculptures and impassioned debates about whether curling is really a sport", and called Farr "a sort of Peter Gzowski from hell" — which he meant as a compliment. Debates on issues "of no consequence" were a recurring feature of the show; another famous debate was on the resolution that being green (in the environmental sense) "is pointless because it's too hard".

== Cancellation ==
The program's cancellation was announced in 1992; the final program aired on June 27 that year. Farr went on to host the new Canada Live in the fall, but lasted only a few weeks before announcing his departure from the show, which he deemed "not a good fit".
