= See Jane Run =

1991 novel by Joy Fielding

- Author: Joy Fielding
- Language: English
- Pages: 496
- ISBN: 9780770429850

See Jane Run is a 1991 novel by Joy Fielding in the thriller genre. It was made into a TV movie in 1995. The title alludes to the Dick and Jane series of children's learn-to-read books.

== Synopsis ==
The book centers on Jane Whittaker, who finds herself on a street corner in downtown Boston with no recollection of her name, her physical features, her personality, or any of the details of her life, albeit being familiar with her surroundings and easily recalling facts such as the formula for the length of a hypotenuse.

She is further terrified to see that she is wearing a blood-stained blue dress, under a long coat which contains in its pockets nearly $10,000. Frightened out of her mind, she heads to a hotel, where she spends a couple of days trying to figure out how to proceed. She decides to go to the local police station, but withholds some key information when she recounts her experience. They take her to the hospital for examination, where she is later reunited with a handsome doctor claiming to be her husband. Dr. Whittaker takes Jane back to their suburban home to recover. Instead of finding rest, however, Jane is overwhelmed by suspicions as she begins to uncover the horrific past that her mind had forgotten.

Along with Dr. Whittaker, a housekeeper named Paula Marinelli - who is obviously loyal to the good doctor - is also taking care of her.
