= Winter Kept Us Warm =

- Theatrical release poster
- Directed by: David Secter
- Written by: David Secter; Ian Porter; John Clute
- Produced by: David Secter
- Starring: John Labow; Henry Tarvainen; Joy Tepperman; Janet Amos
- Cinematography: Robert Fresco; Ernest T. L. Meershoek
- Edited by: Michael Foytényi
- Music by: Paul Hoffert
- Production company: Varsity Films
- Distributed by: Filmmakers Distribution Center
- Release date: 27 September 1965 (Commonwealth Film Festival)
- Running time: 81 minutes
- Country: Canada
- Language: English
- Budget: CAD $8,000

Winter Kept Us Warm is a 1965 Canadian romantic drama film written and directed by David Secter. It stars John Labow, Henry Tarvainen, Joy Tepperman, and Janet Amos. It was the first English-language Canadian film shown at the Cannes Film Festival.

Secter, a student at the University of Toronto, made a short film and was a film critic in The Varsity before making his feature film debut with Winter Kept Us Warm. The title of the film comes from a line in T. S. Eliot's The Waste Land. The film was produced on a limited budget of $8,000 and the entire cast worked for free. Although the film is considered English Canada's first queer film, the cast of the film was not made aware of the film's subject matter during casting. Guerrilla filmmaking tactics were used to film around Toronto and a completed script was never made for the film due to the limited amount of time available.

Before the film was completed the Commonwealth Film Festival in Cardiff, United Kingdom, requested that the film be submitted. Seven minutes of footage was sent and the film was approved. Winter Kept Us Warm premiered as the opening film of the Commonwealth Film Festival. It earned back its production costs and the National Film Board of Canada submitted it to the 1966 Cannes Film Festival's Critics' Week.

== Plot ==
Peter Saarinen, a freshman, and Doug Harris, a returning student, arrive at the University of Toronto. Peter is hired as a waiter at the dining hall and is mocked by Doug and other members of Hunter House, a fraternity. Doug and Peter meet in the library, where Peter is reading The Waste Land, and Doug apologises for his actions in the dining hall.

Doug and three other men go to a restaurant to pick up girls. Bev, Doug's girlfriend, performs a striptease for Doug's friends before going out for lunch with him. He ignores her and looks at other women while she talks about her new dress.

Peter invites Doug over to his room to eat Finnish pastries. Peter, who is of Finnish descent, shows Doug a phonograph record of Finnish music. Doug invites Peter to his room to play the record since Peter does not have a record player. They go to a Harry Belafonte show, then around Toronto's nightlife.

After Hunter House's Christmas party, Peter gets drunk and passes out in the dining hall. He is taken out of the hall and Doug leaves a dance due to his concern about Peter. Doug hangs out with Peter in his room while he recovers from his hangover and the two later play in the snow.

Peter gets the role of the male lead in the play Ghosts and meets Sandra during rehearsal. Doug learns one of the songs from Peter's Finnish record and sings it for him while playing on a guitar. Bev questions why Doug likes Peter so much considering that Peter is not like the rest of his friends. Doug explains that is why he likes him. Bev is angry when Peter tells her and Doug they cannot come to the cast party.

Sandra and Peter fall in love and start dating. As final exams approach, Doug is unable to hang out with Peter alone due to Sandra. Bev and Doug's relationship is strained, and they meet less often. Doug invites Peter to a fraternity dance, but Peter does not attend, going to a club with Sandra instead. Doug has sex with Bev. Doug insults Sandra after Peter tells him he had sex with her. Peter tells Doug to leave his room, and Doug kicks his testicles.

Doug is surrounded in his room by items Peter gave him and plays the Finnish song he played Peter earlier. He goes to the library, where he reads The Waste Land.

== Cast ==
- John Labow as Doug Harris
- Henry Tarvainen as Peter Saarinen
- Joy Tepperman as Bev
- Janet Amos as Sandra
- Iain Ewing as Artie
- Jack Messinger as Nick
- Larry Greenspan as Larry
- Sol Mendelson as Hall Porter
- George Appleby as House Don

== Production ==
=== Development ===
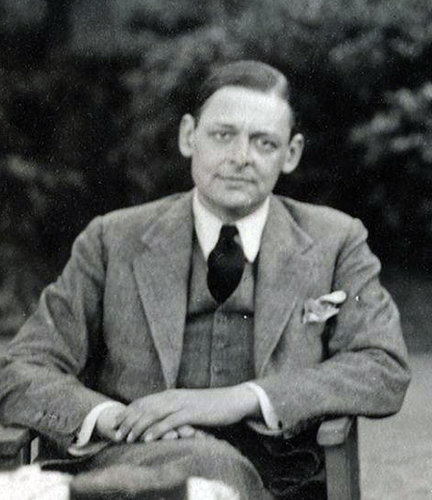
The title of the film, Winter Kept Us Warm, comes from T. S. Eliot's The Waste Land.

David Secter, originally from Winnipeg, was a 4th-year student at University College, University of Toronto when he made Winter Kept Us Warm, his debut feature film. His only prior film experience was the 8 minute short film Love with the Proper Guppy he made on a budget of CAD$31.88. Having been a film reviewer for The Varsity, he has stated that he was inspired by the French New Wave: "A lot of those New Wave guys had started out as critics, and I thought, 'Hey, if they can move from talking about movies to making movies, why can't I?'"

The film was originally titled Doug and Peter, but Secter renamed it to Winter Kept Us Warm which is another line from The Waste Land by T. S. Eliot. When Secter selected the title he was unaware of rumours about Eliot's sexuality or theories about The Waste Land being a gay romance. He felt that the line properly captured how he wanted to portray connections.

Toronto had an active gay community, with nine gay bars in Toronto in 1964. Other Canadian films in the 1960s, such as À tout prendre, The Fox, and Deliver Us from Evil, dealt with queer subjects as well. Secter noted that homosexuality was a "triple taboo" as it was a sin according to religion, a crime by the state, and labeled as a mental illness.

On 1 November 1964, a meeting was held in Eric Rump's room. Many of the attendees believing they were joining a filmmaking club and did not come to later meetings after being told that it was focused on Secter's film project. Ron B. Thomson, who attended the first meeting, became the film's executive producer. According to Thomson, attendance of the meetings fell to around 20, including actors, film crew, and hangers-on. Secter found most of the cast by placing a classified advertisement in the university's student newspaper The Varsity. Secter went to the Ryerson Polytechnic Institute's photography department to find technicians and found Robert Fresco and Ernest Meershoek, the directors of photography for the film. The entire crew worked for free as volunteers.

The fundraising goal for the film was $5,000. The Students' Administration Council offered $750, but Secter stated that this was offered as a loan and would require him to give up distribution rights. The council later gave him $500 with no other requirements. He received $800 from University College, Toronto. The film received a $750 grant from the University of Toronto Students' Union, along with permission to film several key scenes at Hart House. The Canada Council, the Ontario Arts Council, and the National Film Board of Canada declined to give grants. The final cost of the film was $8,000 (equivalent to $80,098 in 2025).

=== Casting ===
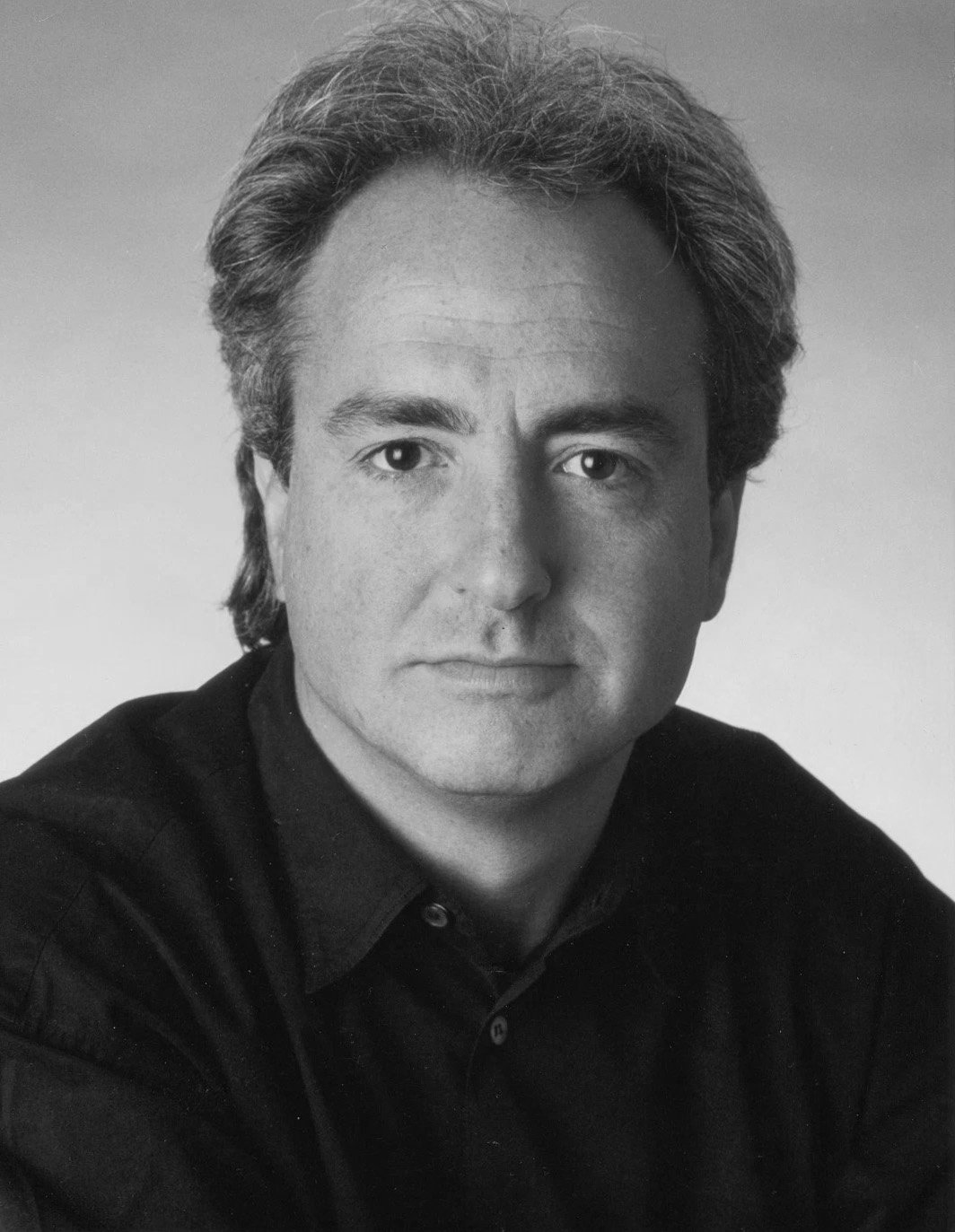
Lorne Michaels was initially cast in the role of Nick, but withdrew from the project.

Although the film is considered English Canada's first gay film, the cast of the film was not made aware of the film's queer subject matter. There were no auditions for the film. Secter noted that the actors were fine with nudity as it was not strange on campus; men still swam nude at Hart House at the time.

The first two actors cast to play Doug withdrew from the project. Secter saw John Labow in a Hart House production of Look Back in Anger. Labow was selected on 18 November and rehearsals with Henry Tarvainen started that afternoon.

Robert Gill, the artistic director of Hart House Theatre, suggested to Janet Amos that she become involved in Winter Kept Us Warm. Joy Tepperman learned of the film from Amos, who was cast as a girlfriend, and asked Secter if she could also be cast as a girlfriend. A second girlfriend did not exist in the script at that point and Doug was initially envisioned as a womanizer. Fielding convinced him to make the character and Secter had her involved in developing it.

Lorne Michaels was initially cast as Nick, but withdrew from the project. He provided assistance with the script. Jack Messinger was selected to replace Michaels. Messinger's leg broke during production and it was incorporated into the film.

=== Filming ===
Winter Kept Us Warm was the first feature film shot at the University of Toronto. There were difficulties with acquiring permission as there was no centralized system and Secter had to ask permission at every location he went to. A 5-page treatment outlining the story and listing the required locations was submitted to Douglas LePan, but rejected the request on 30 October 1964, citing its homoerotic elements.

Secter later stated that he was so inexperienced that he did not know until the first day of filming that the clapperboard was used to synch audio and was instead used to make sure everybody knew he was filming. On 22 November, a scene of Doug and Peter meeting in the library was shot for use in gaining financial support. Filming started at 3 pm and was planned to end at midnight, but lasted until 7 am. The next scene, which features Doug and Peter interacting in a dining room, was shot on 8 December and featured over 100 extras.

Filming started without a script as Secter was pressed for time. He needed to be a student to use university locations and would be graduating the next year. No complete script was made for the film. John Clute and Ian Porter, who appeared in the cast party scene, wrote dialogue for the film.

Most of the shots in the film were done in a single take. The scenes at the library were shot after it closed for the night and the scenes at the dining hall were filmed between mealtimes. Guerrilla filmmaking was used for the winter carnival scenes. The apartment of a cast member's sister was used for Sandra's house and the cast party took place in a basement flat rented by Secter.

Secter obtained partially used film reels from other production companies as a way to cut costs. Bob Crone, the founder of Toronto film lab and post-production facility Film House, agreed to let the production run up a debt. This was the first production that Film House was involved with. 1,200 feet (370 m) of film negatives were lost and never found.

=== Editing ===
On 27 April 1965, Secter received a letter from the Commonwealth Film Festival in Cardiff, United Kingdom, requesting that Winter Kept Us Warm be submitted for consideration. He initially did not reply as the film was not finished, but the festival made and sent multiple phone calls and telegrams. The only portion of the film that had been edited was a 7-minute sample shown to prospective investors, so Secter sent them the sample. Their decision to include the film was confirmed on 16 July, much to the shock of Secter.

Secter had wanted to edit the film himself, but had to change his plans after the film was confirmed for the Commonwealth Film Festival. A three hour rough cut was created by July. Michael Foytényi was brought onto the project at the recommendation of Secter's acting teacher John Hirsch. Foytényi, realizing that the project was too big for him to do on his own, brought on George Appleby. Appleby edited 35–40% of the film by himself according to Secter.

When editing began, the ending for the film had not yet been determined. Secter considered having Doug reconcile with Bev, but instead chose to end the film with Doug reading The Waste Land alone in the library. Filming started again in July and ended on 21 August.

=== Music ===
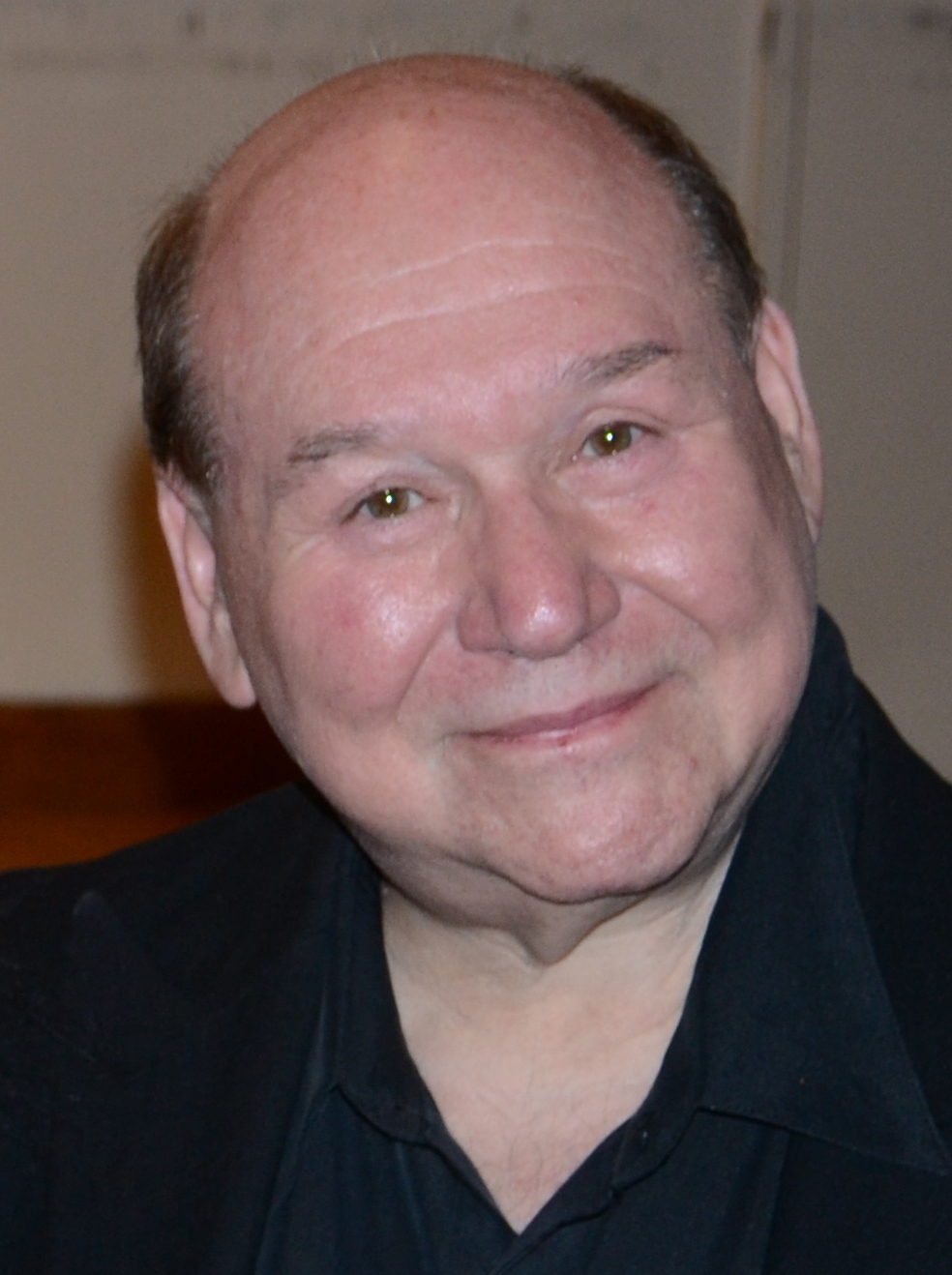
Paul Hoffert, a student at the University of Toronto, was the composer for Winter Kept Us Warm.

Paul Hoffert, a University of Toronto science major, was the film's composer. He was a professional musician and did work for the Canadian Broadcasting Corporation. Hoffert worked for free, but requested a budget for professional musicians. The soundtrack consisted of Rob McConnell on the trombone, Moe Koffman on the flute, Eugene Amaro on the alto sax and flute, Ron Laurie on the cello, Ed Bickert on the guitar, Stan Zadak and Doug Willson on the acoustic double bass, and Ed Thigpen and Stan Perry on the drums.

== Release ==
Secter was unable to find funding to travel to Cardiff and instead travelled with Fresco on a charter flight to Edinburgh alongside a rugby union. Winter Kept Us Warm premiered as the opening film of the Commonwealth Film Festival on 27 September 1965. As the film was on 16 mm film, a special apparatus had to be used due to the theatre normally only showing 35 mm film.

It was distributed in Canada by the Canadian Filmmakers' Distribution Centre. Secter initially sought to show the film at the New Yorker Theatre, but it declined his offer citing its poor sound quality. On 26 October 1965, he booked a two-week screening at the Royal Ontario Museum. Its run at the Royal Ontario Museum started on 6 December, which was the first time the cast saw the completed film. As Secter chose to self-distribute the film he was able to keep most of the profits and pay off the production costs. The Ontario Film Review Board gave the film a Restricted rating. It received a commercial release in January 1966, in Winnipeg and Toronto. By July 1966, the film earned $6,000 in Toronto. Specter received $500 for winning a special jury prize at the 4th Canada Film Festival.

Secter sent a copy of the film to the NFB, hoping that it would agree to distribute the film. Lucille Bishop, the NFB's distribution agent, submitted the film to the 1966 Cannes Film Festival's Critics' Week. Winter Kept Us Warm was the first English-Canadian film to be shown at the Cannes Film Festival. The Canadian government paid for Secter's travel to Cannes.

At the 1984 Festival of Festivals the film was screened as part of Front & Centre, a special retrospective program of artistically and culturally significant films from throughout the history of Canadian cinema. TLA Video released the film on DVD in 2011. In 2015, the film was screened at Buddies in Bad Times during Toronto's Pride Week as the centrepiece of a selection of LGBT-themed Canadian films, to mark the launch of Thomas Waugh's Queer Media Database project.

== Reception ==
Variety's review of the film praised the cinematography of downtown Toronto, but noted that its stilted dialogue and inconsistent sound quality made it more suitable for film societies than theatres. Renata Adler criticized the cinematography as amateurish.

The Western Mail's film review praised its background music and depiction of university life. Frank Morriss gave the film a moderately favourable review in The Globe and Mail writing that Labow's want to have a good time and Tarvainen's desire to make good is interesting, but that the film loses direction when Tarvainen gains confidence and Labow's feelings run amok. Robert Fulford, writing for the Toronto Star, stated that it was "an interesting though uneven exercise", but that it was an encouraging sign for the Canadian film industry.

Kevin Thomas, writing for the Los Angeles Times, praised the film for using a traditional narrative rather than psychedelic effects and cinéma vérité used by other young filmmakers. Jacob Siskind, writing for The Gazette, praised the acting as far better than other student productions.

Writing about the film for The Body Politic in 1982, Thomas Waugh expressed concern about the fact that gay-themed films of its era rarely depicted positive same-sex relationships, but instead usually centred on love triangles involving a woman; while acknowledging that Winter Kept Us Warm reflected this trope, he complimented the film for portraying its women characters with greater integrity than usual for the genre. Norman Wilner wrote that the film was "a breakthrough in its treatment of queer characters as fully dimensional human beings" in a release promoting a fall 2024 screening at the TIFF Lightbox. Joe Medjuck stated that the editing was crude, the acting was clumsy, and felt that the queer elements were not relevant to the plot.

== Accolades ==
| Award | Date of ceremony | Category | Recipient(s) | Result | Ref. |
|---|---|---|---|---|---|
| 4th Festival of Canadian Films | 1966 | Special Jury Prize | Winter Kept Us Warm | Won | |

== Legacy ==
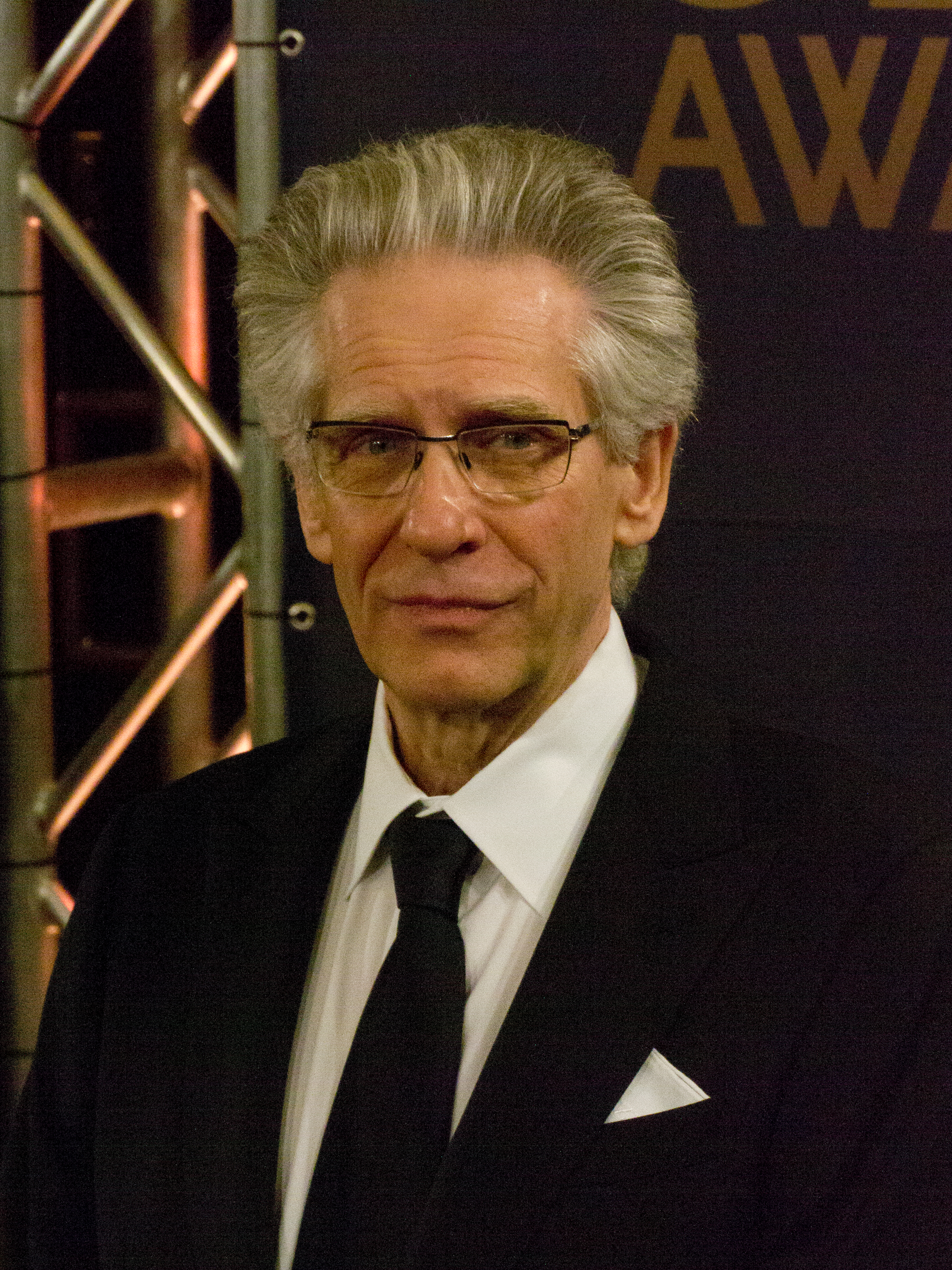
David Cronenberg credits Winter Kept Us Warm with inspiring him to launch his film career.

Winter Kept Us Warm fell from public notice, with it being excluded from the Canadian Film Reader and 50 Years of Queer Cinema, and The Celluloid Closet. Waugh stated that homophobia was the result of its exclusion from Canada's national film history while Radu Davidescu noted that the subtlety of its queerness causes it to be ignored as a queer film. The limited distribution of Winter Kept Us Warm also harmed its visibility according to Waugh.

Although not widely remembered among the general public, Winter Kept Us Warm is considered a major milestone in the Canadian film industry as one of the first Canadian films ever to attract international attention. Secter made a second film, The Offering, in 1966, one of the first Canadian films to depict an interracial romance. David Cronenberg, who was a student at the University of Toronto at the time, was amazed by the film and believed that he too could make films like Secter had.

In the late 1980s Secter considered making a sequel to Winter Kept Us Warm titled Memory and Desire, based on another line from The Waste Land. The film would have been set in 1990, and followed the lives of the four main characters since the previous film. Peter and Sandra were married with a son while Doug and Bev were separated after having a daughter. Doug moves to California and has not seen his daughter in over 20 years. His daughter persuades him to return to Toronto for a class reunion and he meets Peter, Sandra, and Bev.

In the 1990s, Secter's nephew Joel Secter rented Getting Together, not knowing that his uncle had directed films. Seeing David's name in the credits, Joel contacted his uncle to talk about his film career. Those discussions ultimately led to Joel's own debut as a filmmaker, the 2005 documentary The Best of Secter and the Rest of Secter.

In 2023, Telefilm Canada announced that Winter Kept Us Warm was one of 23 titles that would be digitally restored under its new Canadian Cinema Reignited program to preserve classic Canadian films. The restored version premiered at the Inside Out Film and Video Festival in May 2024, before being screened at various film festivals in 2025, including the International Film Festival of Ottawa, BFI Flare, and the Queer North Film Festival.

In 2024, Chris Dupuis published a book about the film as part of the McGill–Queen's University Press Queer Film Classics series.

== Works cited ==
=== Books ===
- Variety Film Reviews: 1964-1967. Vol. 11. Variety. 1983. ISBN 0824052102.
- Rodley, Chris, ed. (1997). Cronenberg on Cronenberg. Faber and Faber. ISBN 0571191371.
- Dupuis, Chris (2024). Greyson, John (ed.). Winter Kept Us Warm. McGill–Queen's University Press. doi:10.1515/9780228020349. ISBN 9780228020349.
- Turner, D. John, ed. (1987). Canadian Feature Film Index: 1913-1985. Canadian Film Institute. ISBN 0660533642.
- Vatnsdal, Caelum. Videodrome. Arrow Films. ISBN 9780228020349.

=== News ===
- "Queer North Film Festival returns to Sudbury next month". The Sudbury Star. 30 May 2025. Archived from the original on 13 June 2025.
- Beeston, Laura (23 June 2015). "Online database of gay Canadian movies launching at Toronto Pride". The Globe and Mail. Archived from the original on 13 June 2025.
- Dupuis, Chris (23 May 2024). "The little-known story behind Canada's first queer film, Winter Kept Us Warm". Canadian Broadcasting Corporation. Archived from the original on 13 June 2025.
- Gainey, Christian (30 June 2022). "The Forgotten Indie Drama That Inspired David Cronenberg". /Film. Archived from the original on 13 June 2025.
- Hertz, Barry (16 May 2024). "Inside the digital resurrection of Winter Kept Us Warm, the seminal Canadian film that history forgot". The Globe and Mail. Archived from the original on 13 June 2025.
- Knegt, Peter (22 April 2020). "5 pioneering LGBTQ Canadian films you can watch for free right now". CBC News.
- Mullen, Pat (9 May 2023). "Oscar Winning Doc Leads List of Restored Canadian Classics". Point of View. Archived from the original on 13 June 2025.
- Pevere, Geoff (24 June 2011). "David Secter, the Varsity visionary". Toronto Star. Archived from the original on 6 March 2021.
- Tabbara, Mona (18 February 2025). "BFI Flare: London LGBTQIA+ Film Festival unveils 2025 line-up". Screen Daily. Archived from the original on 13 June 2025.
- Pedwell, Susan (1 April 2015). "Winter Kept Us Warm". University of Toronto Magazine. Archived from the original on 14 June 2025.

=== Newspapers ===
- Secter, David (17 November 1965). "Lack of experience helps: How to make a do-it-yourself movie without money". The Globe and Mail. p. 13 – via Newspapers.com.
- "No strings attached". The Varsity. 3 March 1965.
- "Only 2 Of 4 Categories Worthy Of Film Awards". Edmonton Journal. 6 August 1966. p. 21 – via Newspapers.com.
- "Producer's First Picture Cost Him A Mere $31.88". Calgary Herald. 14 July 1966. p. 29 – via Newspapers.com.
- "Student Film". Times & Transcript. 27 November 1965. p. 2 – via Newspapers.com.
- "Student Film At McGill Next Week". Montreal Star. 26 February 1966. p. 38 – via Newspapers.com.
- "Student Film Opens In Cardiff". The Hamilton Spectator. 28 September 1965. p. 41 – via Newspapers.com.
- "Winter Coming To Rom". The Varsity. 8 December 1965.
- Hicklin, Ralph (21 November 1964). "Friendship and $750 main ingredients of campus film". The Globe and Mail. p. 15 – via Newspapers.com.
- Knelman, Martin (18 May 2005). "U of T star is born, lands in porn; '60s filmmaker went to Cannes, met Loren". Toronto Star. p. 13 – via Newspapers.com.
- Morriss, Frank (7 December 1965). "College-made film well worth seeing". The Globe and Mail. p. 15 – via Newspapers.com.
- Scott, Jay (2 August 1984). "Mon Oncle Antoine No. 1 with critics". The Globe and Mail. p. 50 – via Newspapers.com.
- Siskind, Jacob (3 March 1966). "Sensitive New Student Film". The Gazette. p. 12 – via Newspapers.com.
- Speirs, Rosemary (6 August 1966). "Secter receives award". The Globe and Mail. p. 13 – via Newspapers.com.
- Thomas, Kevin (16 May 1968). "'Winter' on Screen at Cinematheques". Los Angeles Times. p. 21 – via Newspapers.com.
- Waugh, Thomas (1982). "Uncovering a forgotten Canadian gay film–from 1965". The Body Politic. p. 36.

=== Web ===
- "Winter Kept Us Warm". International Film Festival of Ottawa. Archived from the original on 6 October 2025.
- Hudson, David (7 June 2011). "Cineaste, DVDs, More". Mubi. Archived from the original on 13 June 2025.
- Wilner, Norman (2024). "Winter Kept Us Warm". Toronto International Film Festival. Archived from the original on 14 June 2025.
