= Tanju Gürsu =

Turkish film director (1936–2016)

- Born: 30 October 1938; Trabzon, Turkey
- Died: 7 June 2016 (aged 77); Istanbul, Turkey
- Resting place: Zincirlikuyu Cemetery
- Occupation(s): Actor, director, screenwriter
- Years active: 1959–2016
- Spouse: Ayla Gürsu
- Children: 2

Tanju Gürsu (30 October 1938 – 7 June 2016) was a Turkish actor, director, and screenwriter who was a major star of Turkish cinema in the 1960s and 1970s. He appeared in films such as Haremde Dört Kadın (1965) and Üç Korkusuz Arkadaş (1966) under director Halit Refiğ. As a director, he directed films such as Erkek Kazım (1975) and Kazım'a Bak Kazım'a (1975).

He died of respiratory failure on 7 June 2016 at the age of 77.

== Filmography ==
- Kırık Kanatlar - 2005
- Aşkımızda Ölüm Var - 2004
- Canısı (2) - 1997
- Böyle mi Olacaktı - 1997
- Köpekler Adası - 1996
- Süper Yıldız - 1995
- Sevmek Ve Ölmek Zamanı - 1989
- Canım Oğlum - 1988
- Kurtar Beni - 1987
- Gülümse Biraz - 1986
- Mardin-Münih Hattı - 1986
- Ölüm Yolu - 1985
- Bir Sevgi İstiyorum - 1984
- Taçsız Kraliçe - 1984
- Gülsüm Ana - 1982
- Boynu Bükük - 1980
- Tanrıya Feryat - 1980
- Mücevher Hırsızları - 1979
- Kara Murat Devler Savaşıyor - 1978
- Vahşi Gelin - 1978
- Hedef - 1978
- Dağılın Kazımlar Geliyor - 1976
- Kazım'a Ne Lazım - 1975
- Çirkef - 1975
- Soysuzlar - 1975
- Kazım'a Bak Kazım'a - 1975
- Kokla Beni Melahat - 1975
- Hop Dedik Kazım - 1974
- Vurun Kahpeye - 1973
- Vahşet - 1973
- Bu Toprağın Kızı - 1973
- Yalan Dünya - 1972
- Kırk Yalan Memiş - 1972
- Aşkların En Güzeli - 1972
- Çileli Dünya - 1972
- Kadersizler - 1972
- Rüzgar Murat - 1971
- Yalnız Değiliz - 1971
- Yedi Kocalı Hürmüz - 1971
- Mazi Kalbimde Yaradır - 1970
- Ağlayan Melek - 1970
- Firari Aşıklar - 1970
- Herkesin Sevgilisi - 1970
- Sosyete Şakir - 1970
- Bülbül Yuvası - 1970
- Gülnaz Sultan - 1969
- Yarın Başka Bir Gündür - 1969
- Fakir Kızın Romanı - 1969
- Ana Kalbi - 1969
- Yiğit Anadolu'dan Çıkar - 1969
- Seninle Düştüm Dile - 1969
- Fosforlu Cevriyem - 1969
- Buruk Acı - 1969
- Ağla Gözlerim - 1968
- Bağdat Hırsızı - 1968
- Yakılacak Kitap - 1968
- Malkoçoğlu Kara Korsan - 1968
- Yalan Yıllar - 1968
- Beş Asi Adam - 1968
- Sevmekten Korkuyorum - 1968
- Kabadayı - 1968
- Ayşem - 1968
- Kanun Namına - 1968
- Bizanslı Zorba - 1967
- Kara Davut - 1967
- Devlerin İntikamı - 1967
- Ölünceye Kadar - 1967
- Dişi Killing - 1967
- Elveda - 1967
- Bir Annenin Gözyaşları - 1967
- Bırakın Yaşayalım - 1967
- Yarın Çok Geç Olacak - 1967
- Çıldırtan Arzu - 1967
- Deli Fişek - 1967
- Parmaklıklar Arkasında - 1967
- Arzunun Bedeli - 1966
- Kadın Avcılar - 1966
- Üç Korkusuz Arkadaş - 1966
- Bu Şehrin Belalısı - 1966
- Yemin Ettim Bir Kere - 1966
- Can Yoldaşları - 1966
- Mezarını Hazırla - 1966
- Sarı Gül - 1966
- Silahlar Patlayınca - 1966
- Ölmeyen Aşk - 1966
- Altın Şehir - 1965
- Ateş Gibi Kadın - 1965
- Canın Cehenneme - 1965
- Cumartesi Senin Pazar Benim - 1965
- Hak Yolunda - 1965
- Haremde Dört Kadın - 1965
- Lafını Balla Kestim - 1965
- On Korkusuz Kadın - 1965
- Bitmeyen Kavga - 1965
- Tatlı Yumruk - 1965
- Çiçekçi Kız - 1965
- Ankara'ya Üç Bilet - 1964
- Keşanlı - 1964
- Korkunç Şüphe - 1964
- Paylaşılmayan Sevgili - 1964
- Sen Vur Ben Kırayım - 1964
- Sokakların Kanunu - 1964
- Tığ Gibi Delikanlı - 1964
- Kara Memed - 1964
- Çanakkale Aslanları - 1964
- Köye Giden Gelin - 1964
- Galatalı Fatma - 1964
- Adalardan Bir Yar Gelir Bizlere - 1964
- Hızlı Osman - 1964
- Kara Dağlı Efe - 1964
- Sahte Sevgili - 1964
- Kaynana Zırıltısı - 1964
- Duvarların Ötesi - 1964
- Gurbet Kuşları - 1964
- İki Kocalı Kadın - 1963
- Bütün Suçumuz Sevmek - 1963
- Üç Öfkeli Genç - 1963
- Ölüme Çeyrek Var - 1963
- Ölüm Pazarı - 1963
- Arka Sokaklar - 1963
- Lekeli Kadın - 1962
- Fosforlu Oyuna Gelmez - 1962
- Ver Elini İstanbul - 1962
- Hodri Meydan - 1962
- Şehvet Uçurumu - 1962
