= Feelin' Up =

1976 film by David Secter

- VHS cover
- Directed by: David Secter
- Written by: David Secter
- Produced by: Joey Asaro; Sam Kitt; David Secter
- Starring: Malcolm Groome; Kathleen Seward; Rhonda Hansome; Tony Collado; Charles Douglass
- Cinematography: Marty Knopf
- Edited by: Jane Brodsky
- Music by: Tony Camillo
- Distributed by: Troma Entertainment
- Release date: 1976
- Running time: 82 minutes
- Country: United States
- Language: English

Feelin' Up (also known as Getting Together) is a 1976 comedy film written and directed by David Secter and distributed by Troma Entertainment.

== Plot ==
The plot follows a conservative young man's venture into a world of sexual hijinks.

== Cast ==
- Kathleen Seward
- Malcolm Groome
- Rhonda Hansome

== Legacy ==
The film's most noteworthy impact came when Secter's nephew Joel, who had not been in close contact with his uncle in many years and did not know that his uncle had directed films at all, unwittingly rented the film from a video store in the 1990s. Himself an aspiring filmmaker, he contacted his uncle, and the two collaborated as producers on the 1999 sex comedy film Cyberdorm, although the film was not successful. With even Secter's most historically significant film, Winter Kept Us Warm, nearly forgotten by the early 2000s, the two then collaborated on the 2005 documentary film The Best of Secter and the Rest of Secter, which explored Secter's career from his early success with Winter Kept Us Warm through his decision to abandon filmmaking after Feelin' Up.
