= Bedford College of Higher Education =

Former higher education college based in Bedford, England, active 1976–1994

- Type: Higher education
- Active: 1976–1994
- Location: Bedford, Bedfordshire; England

Bedford College of Higher Education was a higher education institution in Bedford, England, specializing in teacher training.

== History ==
Until 1976, three separate institutions offered tertiary education in Bedford: Bedford College of Physical Education, founded in 1903 by Margaret Stansfeld, in Lansdowne Road (Physical Education training), Bedford College of Education in Polhill Avenue (initial teacher training), and Mander College of Further Education in Cauldwell Street. In 1976 these combined to become Bedford College of Higher Education.

In 1994 the higher education areas merged with the De Montfort University (based in Leicester) and the further education part became Bedford College, Bedford (but still awarding HNDs and Foundation degrees). The teacher-training colleges left De Montfort in 2006 and merged with the University of Luton which changed its name to University of Bedfordshire.

Between 1940 and 1978 women students at the then Bedford College of Physical Education studied three year programmes in physical education but although these were well-regarded, the programmes were not considered to be degree level. In 2022, after a campaign about the academic and physical rigour of the programmes, over 250 women who had studied there were awarded honorary degrees by the now University of Bedfordshire, recognising the quality of these programmes. Among the honorary graduands were Lady Sue Campbell and Hilda Moore, a retired England hockey player.

The Lansdowne campus was sold off in 2007 and remaining higher education provision focussed on the Polhill site. The University of Bedfordshire is now the largest provider of secondary physical education teachers in the UK.

== See also ==
- De Montfort University
- University of Luton
- University of Bedfordshire
- Hereford College of Education
