= Rene Almond =

British-born Canadian dancer, actress and educator

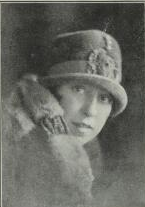
- Irene Mulvany-Gray from a 1927 Australian publication.
- Born: Irene Clarice Mulvany-Gray; 9 August 1894; Brentwood, Essex, England
- Died: 13 January 1972 (aged 77)
- Occupations: dancer, dance educator, actress, mime
- Years active: 1920s-1960s
- Children: Paul Almond

Irene Mulvany-Gray Almond (9 August 1894 – 13 January 1972), known as Rene Almond, was a British-born Canadian dancer, actress, and educator.

== Early life ==
Irene Clarice Mulvany-Gray was born in Brentwood, Essex. She trained at the Ginner-Mawer School of Dance in England. She also appeared on the London stage, with Sybil Thorndike.

== Career ==
Mulvany-Gray performed and taught dance and mime in Christchurch, New Zealand from 1924 to 1926, and Sydney, Australia from 1927 to 1929. In speaking to a group in Sydney in 1927, she explained that "The greatest asset of dancing is that, both mentally and physically, it is a natural form of expression, and for this reason gives great pleasure to the performer."

She moved to Canada and was on the faculty of the Montreal Repertory Theatre's school. With her sister, she ran the Almond-Gray School of Dance, Drama, and Mime in the 1930s. She taught mime and other theatre arts at workshops for children. She also acted in stage and radio plays in Montreal, especially with the Trinity Players, including the title role in Medea, and supporting roles in Hay Fever by Noël Coward, The Petrified Forest by Robert E. Sherwood, and The Bridge by Joseph Schull.

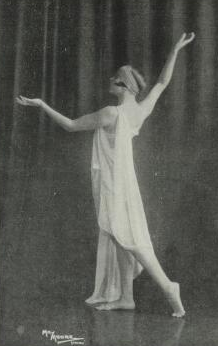
Irene Mulvany-Gray in a dance pose, from a 1927 Australian newspaper.

Her older sister Hilda Mulvany Gray was also a theatre professional, and they often lived, worked, taught, and traveled together. Both sisters were active in the Montreal Play-Reading Club in the 1940s.

== Personal life ==
In 1927, Irene Gray married a Canadian clergyman and World War I veteran, Eric Almond (1895-1953), in Australia. Her son was Canadian-born filmmaker and writer Paul Almond (1931-2015). In 1968, she and her sister traveled to London and Morocco; in 1971, they traveled to Tangiers, Gibraltar, and Malta. She died in 1972 at age 77. Her grave is next to her sister's, in Shigawake, Quebec.
