= Margaret Stansfeld =

British educator (1860–1951)

Margaret Stansfeld OBE
- Born: 10 March 1860; Edmonton, Middlesex, England
- Died: 28 June 1951 (aged 91); Bedford, Bedfordshire, England
- Occupation: Educationalist

Margaret Stansfeld OBE (/ˈstænsfiːld/ STANSS-feeld; 10 March 1860 – 28 June 1951) was a British teacher and educator who was the founder and Principal of the Bedford Physical Training College from 1903 to 1945 and promoted physical education for girls.

== Career ==
Stansfeld was born in Edmonton, Middlesex, on 10 March 1860 and was the daughter of the baker James Stansfeld and his wife Mary Stansfeld, the daughter of James Fallon. She and her elder sister were educated at a board school in London.

In 1881, Stansfeld enrolled on courses for female school teachers, taught by Martina Bergman-Osterberg, and she was recruited as an instructor for Hampstead Physical Training College in 1885. She taught gymnastics and games at girls' schools, including Bedford High School for Girls, and also taught at the Froebel Institute, London, and the Cambridge Training College for Women Teachers. She played a leading role in founding the Ling Association, for the promotion of Swedish gymnastics, in 1899 and later established their library and courses, and was their President from 1910 to 1920. Stansfeld was also a founder of the Bedford Women's Suffrage Society and was President of the Association of Principals of Women's Physical Training Colleges.

Stansfeld founded the Bedford Physical Training College in 1903 and served as its Principal until 1945. She began with 13 students and developed Bedford into an exclusive women's physical training college. She also established the College's Old Students' Association, founded in 1909, which organised annual alumni events. By 1930, the College became a private company. Stansfeld retired as Principal in 1945, aged 85, but continued as the principal shareholder, Chair of the Board and President of the Old Students' Association. In 1949, she briefly returned as Principal after the sudden death of her successor. She died at Bedford on 28 June 1951.

== Honours ==
Stansfeld's contribution to physical education was recognised in her appointment as an Officer of the Order of the British Empire (OBE) in the 1939 Birthday Honours. Her legacy is still remembered with the Margaret Stansfeld Building, named in her honour, forming part of Bedford College.

== Bibliography ==
- Fletcher, Sheila (1984). Women First: The Female Tradition in English Physical Education, 1880-1980. Athlone Press. ISBN 978-0-485-11248-1.
- McCrone, Kathleen E. (1988). Sport and the Physical Emancipation of English Women, 1870-1914. Routledge. ISBN 978-0-415-00358-2.
- Squire, M. (1964). Nine Pioneers in Physical Education. London: Physical Education Association of Great Britain and Northern Ireland.
