= Henry Tarvainen =

Canadian actor and theatre director

- Tarvainen as Peter in Winter Kept Us Warm
- Died: February 3, 2021; Toronto, Ontario, Canada
- Education: University College, Toronto
- Occupations: director, actor, teacher, social activist

Henry Tarvainen (1944/45 – February 3, 2021) was a Canadian actor and theatre director from Toronto, Ontario, most noted as a Dora Mavor Moore Award nominee for Best Direction in a Play at the 1982 Dora Mavor Moore Awards for his production of Charles Tidler's Straight Ahead and Blind Dancers.

== Early career ==
An alumnus of University College at the University of Toronto, where he was a member of student peace and civil rights activist groups, he had an early acting role in the film Winter Kept Us Warm, and subsequently had stage roles and appeared in episodes of Wojeck and Festival. The Festival episode "Reddick" was rebroadcast in the United Kingdom as an episode of Play for Today, and in the United States as an episode of NET Playhouse, and had a 1970 sequel which was broadcast as a standalone television film due to the cancellation of Festival.

== Directing career ==
He became the first resident director at the St. Lawrence Centre for the Arts in the early 1970s, with his early works for the company including productions of The Effect of Gamma Rays on Man-in-the-Moon Marigolds, What the Butler Saw and John Palmer's Memories of My Brother. Beginning in 1973 he spent some time in Montreal, directing a production of George Ryga's Captives of the Faceless Drummer for the Saidye Bronfman Centre and Ronald Garrett's Autumn at Altenburg and Niccolò Machiavelli's The Mandrake for Centaur Theatre.

His other directorial credits included productions of Bajazet, The Riddle of the World, Woyzeck, Twelfth Night, Stoops, Phèdre, The Marriage of Figaro and Rosencrantz and Guildenstern Are Dead

He also taught drama at the National Theatre School of Canada and the Juilliard School.

== Death ==
He died on February 3, 2021, of COVID-19, aged 76.
