= Isabel (film) =

- Film poster
- Directed by: Paul Almond
- Written by: Paul Almond
- Produced by: Paul Almond
- Starring: Geneviève Bujold; Lynden Bechervaise; Therese Cadorette
- Cinematography: Georges Dufaux
- Edited by: George Appleby
- Music by: Harry Freedman
- Production company: Quest Film Productions
- Distributed by: Paramount Pictures
- Release date: 23 July 1968 (United States)
- Running time: 108 minutes
- Country: Canada
- Language: English
- Budget: est. $CAD300,000

Isabel is a 1968 Canadian film written, directed and produced by Paul Almond.

== Synopsis ==
Learning of her mother's serious illness, Isabel (Geneviève Bujold) returns to her family's farm on the Gaspé Peninsula. Her mother dies before she can get there, and when her aged uncle Matthew (Gerard Parkes) asks her to stay on and help him with the farm, she reluctantly agrees. She finds herself haunted by memories of early years (domestic violence, incest and the mysterious deaths of her grandfather, who died in a freak accident, and her father and brother, who both drowned at sea) in a house full of eerie sights and sounds.

== Cast ==
- Geneviève Bujold as Isabel
- Marc Strange as Jason
- Gerard Parkes as Uncle Matthew
- Elton Hayes as Eb
- Edie Kerr as Viola
- Al Waxman as Herb
- Ratch Wallace as Herb's Friend
- Lynden Bechervaise as Herb's Friend
- Eric Clavering as Postmaster
- Therese Cadorette as Sister Estelle
- Rob Hayes as Fisherman
- J. Donald Dow as Storekeeper

== Reception ==
Isabel is the first film of Paul Almond's trilogy made with his then-wife Geneviève Bujold, it won four Canadian Film Awards, and was one of the early Canadian films to be distributed by a major Hollywood studio (Paramount Pictures).

It was featured in the Canadian Cinema television series which aired on CBC Television in 1974.
