= Joy Fielding =

Canadian novelist and actress

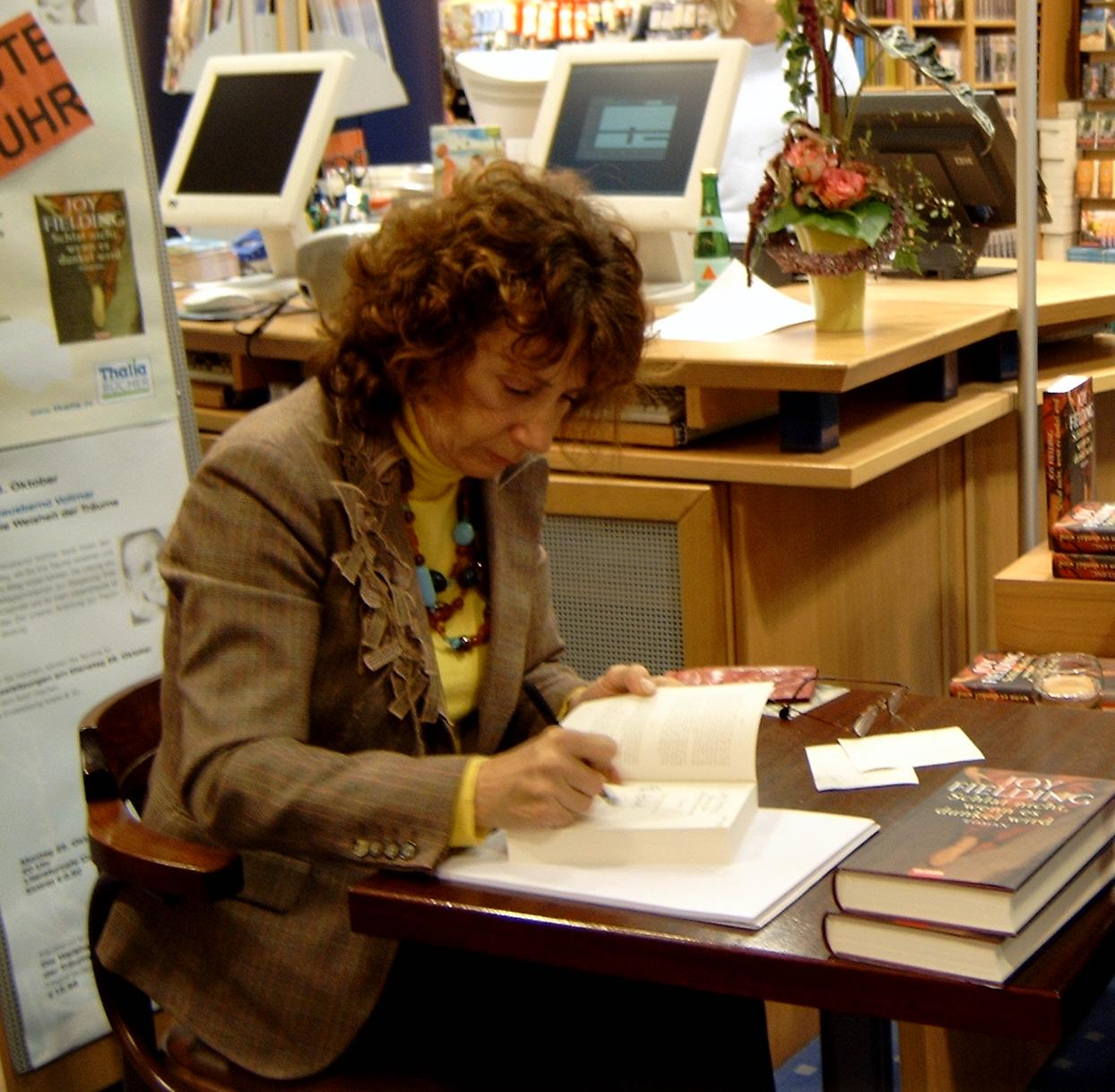
- Fielding signing her books in the German city of Hagen
- Born: Joy Tepperman; March 18, 1945 (age 81); Toronto, Ontario, Canada
- Education: University College, Toronto
- Occupation: Writer
- Writing career
- Notable works: Kiss Mommy Goodbye; See Jane Run
- Website: joyfielding.com

Joy Fielding (née Tepperman; born March 18, 1945) is a Canadian novelist and actress. She lives in Toronto, Ontario.

== Biography ==
Born in Toronto, Ontario, she graduated from University College at the University of Toronto in 1966, with a Bachelor of Arts in English Literature. As Joy Tepperman, she had a brief acting career, appearing in the film Winter Kept Us Warm (1965) and in an episode of Gunsmoke. She later changed her last name to Fielding (after Henry Fielding) and began writing novels.

Fielding is also the screenwriter of the television film Golden Will: The Silken Laumann Story.

In the 1980s, she was also a regular contributor of book reviews to Jack Farr's CBC Radio program The Radio Show.

== Personal ==
At the age of 8, Tepperman wrote her first story and sent it into a local magazine, and at age 12 sent in her first TV script, however both were rejected. She had a brief acting career, eventually giving it up to write full-time in 1972. She has published 30 novels and 1 Novella (as of September 2022), two of which were converted into film. Fielding's process of having an idea to the point the novel is finished generally takes a year, the writing itself taking four to eight months.

Fielding sets most of her novels in American cities such as Boston and Chicago. She has said that she prefers to set her novels in "big American cities, [as the] landscape seems best for [her] themes of urban alienation and loss of identity."

Fielding is a Canadian citizen. Her husband is noted Toronto attorney Warren Seyffert. They have two daughters, Annie and Shannon, and own property in Toronto, Ontario, as well as Palm Beach, Florida.

== Interview ==
Fielding had an interview with the Vancouver Sun in 2007, just after her publication of Heartstopper. She enjoys catching readers off guard with the endings of her stories but insists that it "isn't what her fiction is about" but, rather, more about the development of her characters.

Discussing her novels with the Toronto Star in 2008, she said, "I might not write fiction in the literary sense. But I write very well. My characters are good. My dialog is good. And my stories are really involving. I'm writing exactly the kind of books I like to write. And they're the kind of books I like to read. They're popular commercial fiction. That's what they are."

== Audience ==
Fielding has been noted as a novelist who is more popular in the United States and foreign countries rather than in her native Canada. For example, the novel Kiss Mommy Goodbye was more popular in the States, and See Jane Run in Germany. In addition, she had an American agent and publisher, although she has switched to a Canadian publisher.

== Bibliography ==
- The Best of Friends (1972) – Novel
- The Transformation (1976) – Novel
- Trance (1979) – Novel
- Kiss Mommy Goodbye (1981) – Novel
- The Other Woman (1983) – Novel
- Life Penalty (1984) – Novel
- The Deep End (1986) – Novel
- Good Intentions (1989) – Novel
- See Jane Run (1991) – Novel
- Tell Me No Secrets (1993) – Novel
- Don't Cry Now (1995) – Novel
- Missing Pieces (1997) – Novel
- The First Time (2000) – Novel
- Grand Avenue (2001) – Novel
- Whispers and Lies (2002) – Novel
- Lost (2003) – Novel
- Puppet (2005) – Novel
- Mad River Road (2006) – Novel
- Heartstopper (2007) – Novel
- Charley's Web (2008) – Novel
- Still Life (2009) – Novel
- The Wild Zone (2010) – Novel
- Home Invasion (2011) – Novella
- Now You See Her (2011) – Novel
- Shadow Creek (2012) – Novel
- Someone Is Watching (2015) – Novel
- She's Not There (2016) – Novel
- The Bad Daughter (2018) – Novel (a.k.a. Bleeding Hearts)
- All The Wrong Places (2019) – Novel
- Cul-de-sac (2021) – Novel
- The Housekeeper (2022) – Novel
