= David Secter =

Canadian film director (born 1943)

- Born: 1943 (age 82–83); Canada
- Education: University College, Toronto (BA)
- Occupations: Film director Film producer Screenwriter
- Years active: 1965–present

David Secter is a Canadian film director. He is best known for the 1965 film Winter Kept Us Warm, the first English Canadian film ever screened at the Cannes Film Festival. Widely considered a key milestone in the development of Canadian film, Winter Kept Us Warm was a gay-themed independent film written, directed and funded entirely by Secter, who is gay, while he was a student at University College in the University of Toronto.

Secter released a second film in Canada, titled The Offering, in 1966; however, the film was more poorly received than Winter Kept Us Warm, and because Secter had largely worked with non-union crew, the International Alliance of Theatrical Stage Employees intervened to prevent the film from being screened theatrically anywhere outside of Toronto.

At the time of The Offering's premiere, other projects Secter reportedly had in development included a drama series for CBC Television, a thriller film to be shot in Haliburton County, and a documentary film about the history of IATSE. However, none of the other projects came to fruition, and instead he moved to New York City to pursue opportunities in the much larger American film and theatre industry. He initially was slated to direct Cher's 1969 film Chastity, but dropped out of the project. In New York, he lived with several other experimental filmmakers in a clothing-optional, drug- and sex-friendly commune, and worked as a theatre director. He released the low-budget sex comedy Getting Together (also titled Feelin' Up in some releases) in 1976, and later moved to Los Angeles. He did not work on another film until Cyberdorm in 1997.

In the early 1990s, Secter's nephew Joel Secter rented Getting Together from his local video store in Winnipeg, not knowing that his uncle had directed films. After discovering his uncle's name in the credits, Joel contacted David to discuss his career in film. These discussions culminated in Joel Secter's debut as a filmmaker with the 2005 documentary The Best of Secter and the Rest of Secter. In the film, David revealed that he is HIV-positive.

Also in 2005, David Secter directed and released a documentary film on the Gay Games, titled Take the Flame! Gay Games: Grace, Grit, and Glory.

He is interviewed in Matthew Hays' Lambda Literary Award-winning 2007 book The View from Here: Conversations with Gay and Lesbian Filmmakers.
