= 1980 Dora Mavor Moore Awards =

The 1980 Dora Mavor Moore Awards were the first major award ceremony celebrating excellence in theatre from the Toronto Alliance for the Performing Arts.

== Winners and nominees ==
=== General Theatre Division ===
Production	Original Play
Balconville – Centaur Theatre Productions presented by Toronto Arts Productions; Ain't Lookin' – A T.W.P. Production; Paper Wheat – 25th Street Theatre at Toronto Free Theatre; Strawberry Fields – Toronto Free Theatre	Maggie and Pierre by Linda Griffiths and Paul Thompson – Theatre Passe Muraille; October's Soldiers by Alun Hibbert – Theatre Passe Muraille; Something Red by Tom Walmsley – New Play Centre
Leading Performer	Supporting Performer
Viola Léger for La Sagouine – Théâtre Français de Toronto; Linda Griffiths for Maggie and Pierre – Theatre Passe Muraille; Andrew Gillies for Strawberry Fields – Toronto Free Theatre; Michael Hogan for Something Red – Tarragon Theatre; Dan MacDonald for American Buffalo – New Play Centre; Fiona Reid for Born Yesterday; Wenna Shaw for The Relapse – Phoenix Theatre; R. H. Thomson for Judgement	Geoffrey Bowes for Automatic Pilot – New Theatre; Gary Reineke for Buried Child – Toronto Free Theatre; Sharon Bakker for Paper Wheat – 25th Street Theatre at Toronto Free Theatre; Rosemary Dunsmore for Buried Child – Toronto Free Theatre; Marion Gilsenan for Strawberry Fields – Toronto Free Theatre; Barbara Gordon for The Matchmaker – Theatre Passe Muraille; Richard Monette for Something Red – New Play Centre; Kim Renders for The Matchmaker – Theatre Passe Muraille
Direction	Scenic Design
Guy Sprung for Balconville and Paper Wheat – Centaur Theatre Productions presented by Toronto Arts Productions; Peter Froehlich for Staller's Farm – Theatre Passe Muraille; Ken Livingstone for American Buffalo – New Play Centre; George Luscombe for Ain't Lookin' – A T.W.P. Production	Barbra Matis for Balconville – Centaur Theatre Productions presented by Toronto Arts Productions; Astrid Janson for Refugees – Toronto Workshop Productions and Co-Opera Theatre; Jim Plaxton for Strawberry Fields and Coming through Slaughter – Toronto Free Theatre
Costume Design	Lighting Design
Susan Benson for Twelfth Night – Young People's Theatre; Shawn Kerwin for Happy End – Tarragon Theatre; Martin Johnson for The Matchmaker – Theatre Passe Muraille; Astrid Janson for Flying – Toronto Workshop Productions; Kelly Jay, Kerry Knickle and Maggie Thomas for Orders from Bergdorf – NDWT	Jim Plaxton for Night, Refugees and Strawberry Fields – Toronto Workshop Productions and Co-Opera Theatre, Toronto Free Theatre; Lynne Hyde for Man's a Man; Richard Nieoczym for Hasid

=== Musical Theatre or Revue Division ===
Production (Musical)	Production (Revue or Cabaret)
I'm Getting My Act Together and Taking It on the Road – Beryl Fox and Marlene Smith; Orders from Bergdorf – NDWT; Refugees – Toronto Workshop Productions and Co-Opera Theatre	Indigo – Avid Entertainments; CODCO – Theatre Passe Muraille; Dinah and Friends – Androcles Entertainment; For Whom the Bell Hops – Second City
Performer	Original Score
Salome Bey for Indigo – Avid Entertainments; Dinah Christie for Dinah and Friends – Androcles Entertainment; Judith Lander for I'm Getting My Act Together and Taking It on the Road – Beryl Fox and Marlene Smith; Denis Simpson for Flying and Indigo – Avid Entertainments	Barbara Spence Potter for Colette – Phoenix Theatre; Jim Galloway for Coming through Slaughter – Necessary Angel; Kelly Jay, Kerry Knickle, Carole Lazare and Keith McNair for Orders from Bergdorf – NDWT; Beverly Pannell and Raymond Pannell for Refugees – Toronto Workshop Productions and Co-Opera Theatre

== See also ==
- 34th Tony Awards
- 1980 Laurence Olivier Awards
