= Amaka Umeh =

Nigerian actor

- Born: Chiamaka Umeh; Lagos, Nigeria
- Education: Randolph College for the Performing Arts
- Occupation: Actor
- Years active: 2014–present

Chiamaka Umeh, known professionally as Amaka Umeh, is a Nigerian actor (Note: Umeh is genderfluid and prefers the term actor to actress and also uses all pronouns. This article uses they/them for consistency.) who became the first Black actor and first genderfluid performer to portray Hamlet at the Stratford Festival in Canada in 2020, receiving critical acclaim for the performance. Umeh has received various accolades, including five Dora Mavor Moore Awards. Umeh moved to Canada at the age of 11 and has acted in numerous theatre productions, including The Tempest (2014), A Midsummer Night's Dream (2018), The Wolves (2018), Hamlet (2020–22), Death and the King's Horseman (2023), Sizwe Banzi Is Dead (2023), and A Strange Loop (2025). In 2026, Umeh made their television debut with the role of Dee Pharma on AMC's gothic horror series The Vampire Lestat.

== Early life ==
Chiamaka Umeh was born in Lagos, Nigeria. Umeh is of Igbo and Ikwerre descent and was raised in a Christian household. At the age of 11, Umeh moved with their family to Ottawa, Canada, and they later lived in Calgary and Toronto.

Umeh started acting as a child in Nigeria. Their first theatre experience was with a staged production of a Barney & Friends episode in a concert hall at the Muson Centre in Lagos, in which they sang the first musical number. Umeh kept acting during their primary and secondary school education, and later with Calgary's Summerstock Theatre Society for a few seasons. Umeh was two years into a Biological Sciences major at the University of Calgary when they decided to audition for the Randolph College for the Performing Arts in Toronto, joining the musical theatre program in 2012 and graduating in 2014.

In 2021, Umeh completed the Stratford Festival Birmingham Conservatory for Classical Theatre. Umeh also completed the Factory Theatre Mechanicals and Toronto Fringe T.E.N.T. Programs.

== Career ==
Umeh has starred in numerous Canadian theatre productions. In 2014, Umeh played the role of Ariel in a production of the play The Tempest by William Shakespeare at the Hart House Theatre in Toronto, and was also the narrator on Randolph College for the Performing Arts' production of the musical Into the Woods.

In 2015 and 2016, Umeh played the role of Hasana on Chloé Hung's play All Our Yesterdays, based on the kidnapping of 276 Nigerian schoolgirls by the terrorist group Boko Haram in 2014. Umeh also worked as an assistant director on Crow’s Theatre's 2015 production of Mr. Burns, a Post-Electric Play by Anne Washburn.

In 2017, Umeh played aunt Spiker on Young People's Theatre's production of the musical James and the Giant Peach, for which they received a nomination for the Dora Mavor Moore Award for Outstanding Female Performance.

In 2018, Umeh played the role of Hermia in a production of William Shakespeare's play A Midsummer Night's Dream at the High Park Amphitheatre in Toronto. That same year, they played the role of a high-achieving goalie in the Howland Company and Crow's Theatre production of The Wolves by Sarah DeLappe, for which they won a Dora Award for Outstanding Performance in a Featured Role.

In 2020, Umeh made history by becoming the first Black and first genderfluid actor to portray Hamlet at the Stratford Festival in Canada, first in a filmed performance that was made available for streaming as part of FreeUp! Emancipation Day 2020, after the Stratford production of William Shakespeare's play had to be postponed due to the COVID-19 pandemic, and later in a theatre open to the public in 2022, for which their performance received critical acclaim.

In 2021, Umeh played the role of Captain Ahab in MOBY: A Whale of A Tale, a musical adaptation of Herman Melville's novel Moby-Dick at Pirate Life Theatre in Toronto, for which they won a Dora Mavor Moore Award for Outstanding Performance by an Ensemble.

In 2022, Umeh narrated the audiobook version of Nigerian-Canadian writer Francesca Ekwuyasi's debut novel, Butter Honey Pig Bread. Umeh's narration was praised by the American newspaper The Stranger, who said that their "buttery voice and realistic accents added an extra layer of enjoyment".

In January and March 2023, Umeh portrayed jazz performer Rose Lacroix in Hannah Moscovitch's adaptation of Ann-Marie MacDonald's novel, Fall on Your Knees, at the Bluma Appel Theatre in Toronto, and later toured with the play in Halifax, Ottawa, and London. In May and June 2023, Umeh played Styles/Buntu on Soulpepper Theatre Company's production of Sizwe Banzi Is Dead, for which they won the Dora Mavor Moore Award for Best Leading Performer (General Theatre) in 2024. In December 2023, Umeh was an assistant director on the Cahoots Theatre Company's production of the play Sweeter by Alicia Richardson.

In 2026, Umeh made their television debut with the role of Dee Pharma, a member of the vampire Lestat's entourage on the third season of AMC's gothic horror series The Vampire Lestat.

For their performances in both the musical Narnia by Fiona Sauder, and the play Mary, Mary, Mary, Mary by Erin Shields, Umeh was nominated for two Dora Awards for Outstanding Performance by an Ensemble in 2026. Umeh also hosted the Dora Awards ceremony on 29 June 2026.

In 2027, Umeh will reprise the role of Rose Lacroix in the play Fall on Your Knees at the Guloien Theatre in Toronto.

== Personal life ==
Umeh lives in Toronto, Canada.

Umeh identifies as genderfluid and uses she/her, they/them and he/him pronouns.

== Filmography ==
=== Film ===
Year	Title	Role	Notes	Ref.
2021	The Strangers' Case		Short film	
2023	Death and the King's Horseman	Olohun-iyo - Praise-Singer	Filmed stage performance	
2023	Hamlet	Prince Hamlet	Filmed stage performance	

=== Television ===
Year	Title	Role	Notes	Ref.
2026	The Vampire Lestat	Dee Pharma	Television series	

=== Theatre ===
As actor

Year	Title	Role	Playwright	Company/Venue	Ref.
2014	Into the Woods	Narrator	Stephen Sondheim and James Lapine	Randolph College for the Performing Arts	
2014	The Tempest	Ariel	William Shakespeare	Hart House Theatre	
2014	Jesus Christ Superstar	Caiaphas	Andrew Lloyd Webber and Tim Rice	Lower Ossington Theatre	
2015	This Is For You, Anna	M. 4 / Daughter / Friend / Alicia / Jenny / Victim 3 / Woman 4 / Fiancee	Suzanne Khuri, Ann-Marie MacDonald, Banuta Rubess and Maureen White	Hart House Theatre	
2015	All Our Yesterdays	Hasana	Chloé Hung	The Toronto Fringe Festival	
2016	All Our Yesterdays	Hasana	Chloé Hung	Next Stage Theatre Festival	
2016	Echoes – A New Musical	Performer	Andrew Seok	The Toronto Fringe Festival	
2016	Iza the Brave	Iza	Mihaly Szabados	The Toronto Fringe Festival	
2016	Suitcases	Performer	Rosanna Saracino	Artscape Sandbox	
2017	James and the Giant Peach	Spiker	Timothy Allen McDonald, Benj Pasek and Justin Paul	Young People's Theatre	
2017	PETS	Cat	Ishai Buchbinder	Bellwoods Garage Studio	
2017	"Grab 'Em by the Pussy" or How To Stop Worrying & Love the Bomb	Performer	Rouvan Silogix	Bob Nasmith Innovation Backspace	
2018	The Wolves	#00	Sarah DeLappe	Crow's Theatre	
2018	Beethoven Lives Upstairs	Christa	Barbara Nichol	Grand Theatre	
2018	A Midsummer Night's Dream	Hermia	William Shakespeare	High Park Amphitheatre	
2018	A Christmas Carol	Abigail	Charles Dickens and Dennis Garnhum	Grand Theatre	
2019	Towards Youth	Ensemble	Andrew Kushnir	Crow's Theatre	
2019	Blood + Soil	Snowball	Rouvan Silogix	Bob Nasmith Innovation Backspace	
2019	Hilda's Yard	Bobbi	Norm Foster	Norm Foster Theatre Festival	
2021	A Midsummer Night's Dream	Helena, Flute and Moth	William Shakespeare	Tom Patterson Theatre	
2021	MOBY: A Whale of A Tale	Captain Ahab	Lena Maripuu and Annie Tuma	Pirate Life Theatre	
2022	Hamlet	Prince Hamlet	William Shakespeare	Stratford Festival	
2023	Fall on Your Knees	Rose Lacroix	Hannah Moscovitch	Bluma Appel Theatre	
2023	Death and the King's Horseman	Olohun-iyo - Praise-Singer	Wole Soyinka	Stratford Festival	
2023	Sizwe Banzi Is Dead	Styles/Buntu	Athol Fugard, John Kani and Winston Ntshona	The Michael Young Theatre	
2024	Three Sisters	Igwe	Inua Ellams	Marilyn and Charles Baillie Theatre	
2025	A Strange Loop	Thought 2 / Understudy Thought 1	Michael R. Jackson	Marilyn and Charles Baillie Theatre	
2025	Narnia	Witch	Fiona Sauder	Marilyn and Charles Baillie Theatre	
2026	Mary, Mary, Mary, Mary	Not-A-Mary	Erin Shields	Guloien Theatre	
2027	Fall on Your Knees	Rose Lacroix	Hannah Moscovitch	Guloien Theatre	

As assistant director

Year	Title	Playwright	Director	Company/Venue	Ref.
2015	Mr. Burns, a Post-Electric Play	Anne Washburn	Simon Bloom and Mitchell Cushman	Big Picture Cinema	
2023	Sweeter	Alicia Richardson	Tanisha Taitt	Aki Studio	

=== Audiobook ===
Year	Title	Role	Author	Ref.
2022	Butter Honey Pig Bread	Narrator	Francesca Ekwuyasi	

== Accolades ==
Awards and nominations received by Amaka Umeh
Year	Award	Category	Work	Result	Ref.
2017	Dora Mavor Moore Awards	Outstanding Female Performance (Musical Theatre)	James and the Giant Peach	Nominated	
2019	Dora Mavor Moore Awards	Outstanding Performance in a Featured Role	The Wolves	Won	
2022	Dora Mavor Moore Awards	Outstanding Performance by an Ensemble (Theatre for Young Audiences)	Moby: A Whale Of A Tale	Won	
2024	Dora Mavor Moore Awards	Best Leading Performer (General Theatre)	Sizwe Banzi Is Dead	Won	
2024	Dora Mavor Moore Awards	Outstanding Performance by an Ensemble (General Theatre)	Three Sisters	Won	
2024	Dora Mavor Moore Awards	Outstanding Performance by an Ensemble (Theatre for Young Audiences)	Sweeter	Nominated	
2025	Dora Mavor Moore Awards	Outstanding Performance by an Ensemble (Musical Theatre)	A Strange Loop	Won	
2026	Dora Mavor Moore Awards	Outstanding Performance by an Ensemble (General Theatre)	Mary, Mary, Mary, Mary	Nominated	
2026	Dora Mavor Moore Awards	Outstanding Performance by an Ensemble (Musical Theatre)	Narnia	Nominated	
2022	Black Business and Professional Association	Harry Jerome President's Award	—N/a	Won	
2023	Stratford Festival	Peter Donaldson Award	—N/a	Won	
2025	Toronto Theatre Critics Awards	Best Ensemble Performance in a Musical	A Strange Loop	Won	
