= Tanja Jacobs =

Belgian-born Canadian actress and director

- Born: Belgium
- Education: York University (MFA)
- Occupations: Actor and director

Tanja Jacobs is a Belgian-born Canadian actress and theatre director. She originated the role of Constance Ledbelly in Anne-Marie MacDonald's Goodnight Desdemona (Good Morning Juliet).

== Early life ==
Jacobs was born in Belgium to German parents. Her mother, Katia Jacobs, was a visual artist. At age 5, following the collapse of her parents' marriage, she, her mother, and older brother relocated to Canada. Katia Jacobs would later remarry Bill Kennedy, who Tanja considers to be her father. Jacobs says she knew she wanted to be an actress at age 9. At age 16, Jacobs left high school. She began taking acting classes at age 18.

== Career ==
At age 22, Jacobs landed her first notable role playing Dr. Chebutykin in an all-female production of Chekhov's Three Sisters.

In the 1980s, Jacobs was a member of the Toronto theatre company, Autumn Angel. Other company members were Richard Rose, Thom Sokoloski, Maggie Huculak, Stewart Arnott, Kim Renders, Bruce Vavrina and Mark Christmann.

In 1987, landed the role of Skinner in Howard Baker's The Castle. The production marked a turning point in Jacobs' career; after that performance, she worked almost constantly.

Jacobs originated the role of Constance Ledbelly in Ann-Marie MacDonald's Goodnight Desdemona (Good Morning Juliet) in 1988. Jacobs was nominated for a Dora Mavor Moore Award for her performance.

== Personal life ==
Jacobs has a daughter, Nina, who was born in 1998. Following Nina's birth, Jacobs took a break from her career to be a stay-at-home mother. In 2018, Jacobs completed her MFA in Stage Direction at York University.

== Filmography ==
Television

Year	Title	Role	Notes	Ref.
2005	Slings & Arrows	Witch #2	3 episodes	
1999	Power Play	SM3 Reagan Sexsmith	6 episodes	
1997	The New Ghostwriter Mysteries	Mrs. Shepherd	Episode: "Disappearing Act"	
1995	A Taste of Shakespeare	Gertrude / Laertes / Gravedigger	Episode: "Hamlet"	
1995	Ready or Not	Madame Futuro	Episode: "Crossing the Line"	
1995	Side Effects	Lola	Episode: "Sixth Sense"	
1990	War of the Worlds	Miss Gholston	Episode: "The Pied Piper"	
1988	Alfred Hitchcock Presents	Marjorie	Episode: "Animal Lovers"	
1987	Seeing Things	Lady Theresa	Episode: "Here's Looking at You"	
1987	Street Legal	Jill	6 episodes	
1985	The Suicide Murders	Martha Tracy	TV movie	

Film

Year	Title	Role	Notes	Ref.
1999	Below the Belt		Short film	

== Theatre credits ==
As director:

Year	Production	Company	Notes	Ref.
2022	Orphans For The Czar	Crow's Theatre		
2021	Paradise Lost	Canadian Stage		
2019	Getting Married	Shaw Festival		
2018	A Midsummer Night's Dream	Shakespeare in High Park (Canadian Stage)		
2018	La Bete	Soulpepper		
2018	Love and Information	Canadian Stage	Co-directed with Alistair Newton	
2017	Twelfth Night	Shakespeare in High Park (Canadian Stage)		
2016	The Model Apartment	Harold Green Jewish Theatre		
2010	The Eleventh David	Theatre Passe Muraille (Backstage Buzz)		
2002	1002 Nights	Shed Co.		
2000	Goddess	Theatre of the Repressed and Sansregret Productions	At Toronto Fringe	

As actor:

Year	Production	Company/Theatre	Role	Notes	Ref.
2019	Cyrano de Bergerac	Shaw Festival	Le Bret		
2018	The Assembly: episode 1	Porte Parole and Crow's Theatre	Valerie		
2015	The Watershed	Panamania (Pan Am/Parapan Am Games)			
2014	Bloody Family	Theatre Centre	Clytemnestra		
2012	Grannie Didn't Go To Florida	SNAP Productions and Theatre Hetaerae (Cooking Fire Theatre Festival)	Grannie		
2012	Seeds	Crow's Theatre and Porte Parole			
2011	Tout Comme Elle	Necessary Angel (Luminato Festival)			
2010	Happy Days	Theatre Columbus	Winnie		
2010	Mother Courage and Her Children	National Arts Centre	Mother Courage		
2008	The Way of the World	Soulpepper and National Arts Centre	Lady Wishfort		
2006	The Innocent Eye Test	Mirvish Productions			
2006	Great Peace	Actors Repertory Company		Staged reading	
2005	Frozen	Citadel Theatre			
2004	The Swanne: Queen Victoria (The Seduction of Nemesis)	Stratford Festival			
2003	Orchidelirium	Pea Green Theatre and Theatre Voce			
2003	Phaedre	Soulpepper			
2002	Far Horizons Hotel	Playwrights' Workshop Montreal and Factory Theatre		Staged reading	
2002	Girl in the Goldfish Bowl	Tarragon Theatre			
2001	Elisa's Skin	Tarragon Theatre	Elisa		
2001	A Christmas Carol	Soulpepper Theatre at the Premiere Dance Theatre			
2001	Tempest (Note: The production used simply, Tempest, rather than the more typical title, The Tempest.)		Ariel		
2001	A Trickster Tale	Theatre Direct		Touring school production	
2000	The Wild Stage: An Evening Of German Cabaret	Alt.COMedy Lounge			
1993	Abundance	Harbourfront Centre	Macon		
1991	Writing With Our Feet		Sophie, Alphonsinette, Zenaide, Lucy, Father Rocky, and Raymond Loewy		
1989	The Man I Love	Tarragon Theatre	Max		
1989	The Possibilities	Necessary Angel	Multiple roles		
1988	Goodnight Desdemona (Good Morning Juliet)	Nightwood Theatre	Constance Ledbelly		
1987	The Castle	Necessary Angel	Skinner		
1984	Under the Skin				
	Three Sisters		Dr. Chebutykin		

== Awards ==
Year	Award	Category	Work	Role	Result	Ref.
2018	Gina Wilkinson Prize for an Emerging Female Director	N/A	N/A	N/A	Won	
2010	Dora Mavor Moore Awards	Outstanding Performance by a Female in a Principal Role	Happy Days		Nominated	
2003	Dora Mavor Moore Awards	Performance in a Feature Role in a Play or Musical	Girl in the Goldfish Bowl		Won	
2002	Dora Mavor Moore Awards	Outstanding Performance by a Female in a Featured Role	Elisa's Skin	Elisa	Nominated	
1994	Dora Mavor Moore Awards	Outstanding Performance by a Female in a Featured Role	Abundance		Nominated	
1990	Dora Mavor Moore Awards	Outstanding Performance by a Female in a Featured Role	Goodnight Desdemona (Good Morning Juliet)	Constance Ledbelly	Nominated	
1984	Dora Mavor Moore Awards	Outstanding Performance by a Female in a Featured Role	Under the Skin		Won	
