= Dora Mavor Moore Award for Best Leading Actress (Musical Theatre) =

The Dora Mavor Moore Award for Outstanding Performance by a Female in a Principal Role - Musical is an annual award celebrating achievements in live Canadian theatre.

== Winners and nominees ==
=== 1980s ===
Year	Actress	Play	Ref
1981	Susan Cox	Valentine Browne	
1981	Denise Ferguson	The Boyfriend	
1981	Jodi Glassman	Toronto, Toronto	
1981	Liliane Stilwell	We Got Love	
1982	Kathy Michael McGlynn	Piaf: Her Songs, Her Loves	
1982	Susan Cuthbert	Dames at Sea	
1982	Christina Frolick	Rose Marie	
1983	Sheila McCarthy	Really Rosie	
1983	B.J. Reed	Ain't Misbehavin'	
1983	Jackie Richardson	Ain't Misbehavin'	
1984	Darcy Dunlop	Noel and Gertie	
1984	Salome Bey	Shimmytime	
1984	Mary Ellen Mahoney	Funny Girl	
1985	Sheila McCarthy	Little Shop of Horrors	
1985	Sally Cahill	Once More with Fooling	
1985	Monique Leyrac	1900	
1986	Allison Grant	The Secret Garden	
1986	Linda Kash	Bordering on Madness, or Who's Tory Now	
1986	Camilla Scott	Evita	
1987	Cynthia Dale	Pal Joey	
1987	Linda Kash	Not Based on Anything by Stephen King	
1987	Tracey Moore	Anne of Green Gables	
1988	Ranee Lee	Lady Day at Emerson's Bar and Grill	
1988	Shirley Douglas	Company	
1988	Patricia Vanstone	Girls in the Gang	
1989	Louise Pitre	Blood Brothers	
1989	Loretta Bailey	Les Misérables	
1989	Tracey Moore	The Threepenny Opera	

=== 1990s ===
Year	Actress	Play	Ref
1990	Charlotte Moore	The Rocky Horror Show	
1990	Rebecca Caine	The Phantom of the Opera	
1990	Tracey Moore	Rigoletto	
1991	Maria Vacratsis	2nd Nature	
1991	Mary Ann McDonald	That Scatterbrain Booky	
1991	Jessica Wilson	Anne of Green Gables	
1992	Norma Dell'Agnese	God Almighty's Second-Class Saloon	
1992	Barbara Barsky	Closer Than Ever	
1992	Julain Molnar	Brigadoon	
1993	Large Theatre		
1993	Kate Hennig	Ratbag	
1993	Hazel Desbarats	Falling Angels	
1993	Midsize Theatre		
1993	Shari Saunders	Nigredo Hotel	
1993	Barbara Barsky	Chutzpah à go-go	
1993	Suzanne Bennett	Une Soirée avec Jacques Brel	
1993	Ellen Gould	Liebe Lenya	
1994	Louise Pitre	Piaf	
1994	Barbara Barsky	Forbidden Broadway	
1994	Ma-Anne Dionisio	Miss Saigon	
1994	Cee-Chee Harshaw	Once on the Island	
1994	Janet Macewan	The House of Martin Guerre	
1995	Large Theatre		
1995	Kathy Michael McGlynn	Into the Woods	
1995	Loretta Bailey	Into the Woods	
1995	Jinky Llamanzares	Tommy	
1995	Jennifer Lyon	Tommy	
1995	Mary Pitt	Into the Woods	
1995	Midsize Theatre		
1995	Paulina Gillis	Assassins	
1995	Barbara Barsky	Assassins	
1995	Sabrina Grdevich	The Old Man's Band	
1995	Jackie Harris	Up Against the Wal-Mart	
1995	Ellen-Ray Hennessy	Strange Little Monsters	
1996	Large Theatre		
1996	Mary Ellen Mahoney	A Little Night Music	
1996	Kerry Butler	Beauty and the Beast	
1996	Anita Louise Combe	Sunset Boulevard	
1996	Marion Gilsenan	A Little Night Music	
1996	Judy Marshak	Beauty and the Beast	
1996	Midsize Theatre		
1996	Paulina Gillis	The Barber of Seville	
1996	Jayne Lewis	Falsettos	
1996	Janet van de Graaf	Byte Me	
1997	Large Theatre		
1997	Audra McDonald	Ragtime	
1997	Rita Gorr	Dialogues des Carmelites	
1997	Marin Mazzie	Ragtime	
1997	Mary Ann McDonald	Passion	
1997	Susan Marie Pierson	Elektra	
1997	Midsize Theatre		
1997	Liza Balkan	Still the Night	
1997	Nola Augustson	The Martha Stewart Projects	
1997	Sandra Caldwell	Sophisticated Ladies	
1997	Theresa Tova	Still the Night	
1997	Janet van de Graaf	Tragically OHIP	
1998	Rebecca Caine	The Cunning Little Vixen	
1998	Krysten Cummings	Rent	
1998	Judith Forst	Oedipus Rex with Symphony of Psalms	
1998	Kristine Jepson	Hansel & Gretel	
1998	Julain Molnar	The House of Martin Guerre	
1999	Irina Mishura	Il Trovatore	
1999	Kimberly Barber	Xerxes	
1999	Ruxandra Donose	Norma	
1999	Taborah Johnson	The Nutmeg Princess	
1999	Valarie Pettiford	Fosse	

=== 2000s ===
Year	Actress	Play	Ref
2000	Paula Wolfson	Shaking the Foundations	
2000	Isabel Bayrakdarian	Don Giovanni	
2000	Mary Lou Fallis	Primadonna	
2000	Judy Marshak	Anything That Moves	
2000	Jane Miller	Shaking the Foundations	
2001	Louise Pitre	Mamma Mia!	
2001	Loretta Bailey	Outrageous!	
2001	Mary Lou Fallis	Primadonna’s First Farewell Tour	
2001	Mary Ellen Mahoney	Mamma Mia!	
2001	Zhe Ge Zeng	Iron Road	
2002	Glynis Ranney	Anything That Moves	
2002	Melissa Thompson	Snow White and the Magnificent Seven	
2003	Melody Johnson	Little Mercy's First Murder	
2003	Barbara Barsky	Snappy Tales: Short Satirical Musicals	
2003	Nora McLellan	Robin Hood	
2003	Jeanine Noyes	A Dixie Gospel	
2003	Fiona Reid	Sweeney Todd	
2003	Regan Thiel	Sweeney Todd	
2004	Montego Glover	Cookin' at the Cookery	
2004	Sarah Cornell	The Producers	
2004	Susan Gilmour	Pélagie	
2004	Jackie Richardson	Cookin' at the Cookery	
2004	Amy Rutherford	Tequila Vampire Matinée	
2005	Mary Ann McDonald	Urinetown	
2005	Divine Brown	Ain't Misbehavin'	
2005	Mary Ann McDonald	Side by Side by Sondheim	
2005	Vanessa Olivarez	Hairspray	
2005	Jennifer Waiser	Urinetown	
2006	Corrine Koslo	Bunnicula	
2006	Rebecca Jackson Mendoza	Lord of the Rings	
2006	Elena Juatco	Snow White and the Group of Seven	
2006	Louise Pitre	Song & Dance	
2006	Carly Street	Lord of the Rings	
2007	Corrine Koslo	Seussical	
2007	Sarah Cornell	Evil Dead the Musical	
2007	Melody Johnson	I Think I Can	
2007	Jayne Lewis	Menopause Out Loud!	
2007	Erica Peck	We Will Rock You	
2008	Nicole Underhay	Fire	
2008	Patty Jamieson	A Man of No Importance	
2008	Britta Lazenga	Dirty Dancing	
2008	Amélie Lefebvre	Et si on chantait...	
2008	Sharron Matthews	The Wizard of Oz	
2008	Patricia Zentilli	Little Shop of Horrors	
2009	Elicia MacKenzie	The Sound of Music	
2009	Barbara Barsky	A New Brain	
2009	Paula Brancati	Cinderella: The Sillylicious Family Musical	
2009	Jane Miller	You're a Good Man, Charlie Brown	
2009	Nadine Villasin	The Forbidden Phoenix	

=== 2010s ===
Year	Actress	Play	Ref
2010	Louise Pitre	The Toxic Avenger	
2010	Jacquelyn French	The Light in the Piazza	
2010	Patty Jamieson	The Light in the Piazza	
2010	Trish Lindstrom	Assassins	
2010	Trish Lindstrom	Mimi	
2011	Kate Hennig	Billy Elliot	
2011	Ma-Anne Dionisio	Miss Saigon	
2011	Gabi Epstein	To Life	
2011	Louise Pitre	A Year with Frog and Toad	
2011	Shelley Simester	[title of show]	
2012	Arlene Duncan	Caroline, or Change	
2012	Neema Bickersteth		
2012	Deborah Hay	Caroline, or Change	
2012	Jane Johanson	Seussical	
2012	Sabryn Rock	Caroline, or Change	
2013	Lisa Horner	The Wizard of Oz	
2013	Steffi DiDomenicantonio	Cinderella	
2013	Jan Alexandra Smith	Bloodless: The Trial of Burke and Hare	
2013	Carly Street	Bloodless: The Trial of Burke and Hare	
2014	Melissa O'Neil	Les Misérables	
2014	Ma-Anne Dionisio	Cats	
2014	Arlene Duncan	Once on This Island	
2014	Glynis Ranney	London Road	
2014	Fiona Reid	London Road	
2015	Trish Lindstrom	Once	
2015	Susan Gilmour	The Wild Party	
2015	Marisa McIntyre	Company	
2015	Cara Ricketts	The Wild Party	
2015	Saidah Baba Talibah	What Makes a Man	
2016	Lisa Horner	Grey Gardens	
2016	Neema Bickersteth	Century Song	
2016	A. J. Bridel	Kinky Boots	
2016	Kira Guloien	Grey Gardens	
2017	Jenn Colella	Come from Away	
2017	Arinea Hermans	Seussical	
2017	Sabryn Rock	Passing Strange	
2017	Amaka Umeh	James and the Giant Peach	
2017	Astrid van Wieren	Come from Away	
2018	Tracy Michailidis	Life After	
2018	d'bi.young.anitafrika	Lukumi: A Dub Opera	
2018	Ellen Denny	Life After	
2018	Sara Farb	Fun Home	
2018	Hannah Levinson	Fun Home	
