= Dora Mavor Moore Award for Best Leading Performer (General Theatre) =

The Dora Mavor Moore Award for Best Leading Performer (General Theatre) is an annual Canadian theatre award, presented as part of the Dora Mavor Moore Awards to honour the year's best performance in a leading role in a stage production in the Toronto theatre market.

At the first awards in 1980, a single ungendered category was presented, with two winners. The following year, separate awards were presented for Best Leading Actor and Best Leading Actress, which remained in place until TAPA announced in 2018 that they would return to presenting ungendered acting categories.

== Winners and nominees ==
| Year | Actress | Title | Ref |
|---|---|---|---|
| 1980 | Linda Griffiths | Maggie and Pierre | |
| 1980 | Viola Léger | La Sagouine | |
| 1980 | Andrew Gillies | Strawberry Fields | |
| 1980 | Michael Hogan | Something Red | |
| 1980 | Dan MacDonald | American Buffalo | |
| 1980 | Fiona Reid | Born Yesterday | |
| 1980 | Wenna Shaw | The Relapse | |
| 1980 | R. H. Thomson | Judgement | |
From 1981 to 2019 see Dora Mavor Moore Award for Best Leading Actor (General Theatre) and Dora Mavor Moore Award for Best Leading Actress (General Theatre).
| 2019 | Virgilia Griffith | Harlem Duet | |
| 2019 | Lovell Adams-Gray | Ma Rainey's Black Bottom | |
| 2019 | Sarah Afful | Orlando | |
| 2019 | Maev Beaty | Secret Life of a Mother | |
| 2019 | Yolanda Bonnell | bug | |
| 2019 | Vivien Endicott-Douglas | Guarded Girls | |
| 2019 | Natasha Mumba | School Girls; or, The African Mean Girls Play | |
| 2019 | Gray Powell | Middletown | |
| 2020 | Anand Rajaram | Buffoon | |
| 2020 | Maev Beaty | August: Osage County | |
| 2020 | Saïd Benyoucef | Besbouss | |
| 2020 | Daren A. Herbert | Jesus Hopped the 'A' Train | |
| 2020 | Xavier Lopez | Jesus Hopped the 'A' Train | |
| 2020 | Durae McFarlane | The Flick | |
| 2020 | Nancy Palk | August: Osage County | |
| 2020 | Amy Rutherford | A Streetcar Named Desire | |
| 2021 | No ceremony held due to the effect of the COVID-19 pandemic in Canada on theatre production in 2020. | | |
| 2022 | Alexis Gordon | Room | |
| 2022 | Cliff Cardinal | The Land Acknowledgment (As You Like It) | |
| 2022 | Carolyn Fe | Three Women of Swatow | |
| 2022 | Tony Ofori | Pipeline | |
| 2022 | Oyin Oladejo | Is God Is | |
| 2022 | Zorana Sadiq | MixTape | |
| 2022 | Vanessa Sears | Is God Is | |
| 2022 | Hannah Spear | Mission Totally Possible | |
| 2023 | Dan Mousseau | Prodigal | |
| 2023 | Virgilia Griffith | Our Place | |
| 2023 | Deborah Hay | Fall On Your Knees Part Two: The Diary | |
| 2023 | Ali Kazmi | Behind the Moon | |
| 2023 | Allan Louis | Red Velvet | |
| 2023 | Ahmed Moneka | Bengal Tiger at the Baghdad Zoo | |
| 2023 | Sophia Walker | Our Place | |
| 2023 | Bahia Watson | Uncle Vanya | |
| 2024 | Amaka Umeh | Sizwe Banzi is Dead | |
| 2024 | Sean Arbuckle | Casey and Diana | |
| 2024 | Damien Atkins | Here Lies Henry | |
| 2024 | Walter Borden | The Last Epistle of Tightrope Time | |
| 2024 | Daniel MacIvor | The Inheritance, Pt. 1 | |
| 2024 | Ahmed Moneka | King Gilgamesh and the Man of the Wild | |
| 2024 | Mike Shara | The Master Plan | |
| 2024 | Bahia Watson | shaniqua in abstraction | |
| 2025 | Miriam Fernandes | Mahabharata: Part One: Karma: The Life We Inherit | |
| 2025 | Akosua Amo-Adem | Table for Two | |
| 2025 | Martha Burns | Who's Afraid of Virginia Woolf? | |
| 2025 | Ins Choi | Kim's Convenience | |
| 2025 | Peter Fernandes | Fat Ham | |
| 2025 | Virgilia Griffith | Rosmersholm | |
| 2025 | Vanessa Sears | Shedding a Skin | |
| 2025 | Kevin Matthew Wong | Benevolence | |
| 2026 | Sophia Walker | Slave Play | |
| 2026 | Amanda Cordner | How to Catch Creation | |
| 2026 | Michelle Monteith | Red Like Fruit | |
| 2026 | Béatrice René-Décarie | The Misunderstanding (Le malentendu) | |
| 2026 | Ordena Stephens-Thompson | The Neighbours | |
| 2026 | Gabriella Sundar Singh | Through the Eyes of God | |
| 2026 | Bahia Watson | Summer and Smoke | |
| 2026 | Bahia Watson | The Welkin | |
