= SATE =

Canadian rock singer

SATE is the stage name of Saidah Baba Talibah, a Canadian rock singer from Toronto, Ontario. Her 2021 album The Fool was named a Juno Award nominee for Alternative Album of the Year at the Juno Awards of 2022.

== Background ==
The daughter of restaurateur Howard Matthews and influential Canadian blues and jazz singer Salome Bey, she began her musical career as an occasional performer with her mother under the name Salome Bey and the Relatives. She was a vocalist with the funk rock band Blaxäm in the 1990s, alongside her sister Tuku and Washington Savage of Infidels. The band released the EP Kiss My Afro in 1998, but broke up before releasing a full-length album.

== Solo career ==
As Saidah Baba Talibah, she continued to perform as a solo artist, and released her debut solo album (S)cream in 2011. In this era, she described herself as having been inspired in part by Black Rock Coalition artists such as Living Colour.

In 2014, she performed at Toronto's Luminato Festival with TV on the Radio. In 2015, she received a Dora Mavor Moore Award nomination for Best Leading Actress, Musical Theatre for her stage performance in What Makes a Man.

She subsequently changed her stage name to SATE, on the grounds that performing under her given names was giving audiences a false impression that they would be seeing a world music artist, when in fact her music blends elements of soul and funk with blues rock and punk rock. As SATE, she released the album RedBlack&Blue in 2016; the album's track "Know My Name" has been used as backing music in promotional advertisements for Sportsnet.

The Fool was released in 2021. Her video for the song "Nobody" features The OBGMs appearing as her backing band; the album track "Guardian Angel", a short interlude, is a recording of SATE as a child singing along with her mother, which Saidah found in her mother's possessions only after her death in 2020.
