= Ahmed Moneka =

Iraqi-Canadian actor and musician

- Born: Baghdad, Iraq
- Occupations: Actor, musician
- Years active: 2012–present

Ahmed Moneka is an Iraqi-Canadian actor, musician, and writer. He is the front man of Moneka Arabic Jazz, whose 2024 album Kanzafula received a Juno Award nomination. He also co-created and starred in the play King Gilgamesh & the Man of the Wild, and wrote the book for the musical It's a Good Life If You Don't Weaken.

== Life and career ==
=== Early life and education ===
Moneka was born in Baghdad. His father is from Basrah, and his family are Afro-Iraqis and practice Sufism. According to Moneka, his family traces its roots back to the 7th century when they came from the Mombasa area of present-day Kenya, and they preserved the music and rituals of that heritage.

Moneka attended Baghdad's Institute of Fine Arts as a teenager, and later attended the Academy of Fine Arts at the University of Baghdad. While at school, Moneka learned maqam, the Arabic style of singing.

=== Career ===
In his hometown, Moneka worked as a television presenter. He was also a member of the Iraqi National Theatre, and acted in several other theater groups. Moneka played Romeo in Romeo and Juliet in Baghdad, a production which was commissioned by the Royal Shakespeare Company for its 2012 World Shakespeare Festival and was performed in Stratford-upon-Avon and London.

In 2015, Moneka co-wrote and starred in the film The Society, which depicts gay relationships in Baghdad. After the film premiered at the Toronto International Film Festival in September 2015, Moneka received threats in Iraq because of its subject matter, and he sought asylum in Toronto, Ontario.. While in Toronto, Moneka began performing in Kensington Market. His first band was Moskitto Bar, formed in 2016 with French musician Tangi Ropars and Ukrainian musician Yura Rafaluik. Moneka later created the Moneka Arabic Jazz band, an ensemble of musicians from several countries. The band's music draws on Moneka's Afro-Sufi heritage by combining African and Arabic folk music with jazz, funk, and soul, and has toured in Chile, Colombia, Morocco, South Korea, and the United States.

While in Toronto, he studied theatre at the Soulpepper Academy and worked with various performing arts organizations including the Canadian Opera Company and the Toronto Jazz Festival. In 2022, he played Musa in Bengal Tiger at the Baghdad Zoo, which led to him being nominated for a Dora Award for Best Leading Performer.

In 2024, Moneka released his debut album Kanzafula, which was nominated for Global Music Album of the Year at the 2025 Juno Awards. He co-wrote the play King Gilgamesh & the Man of the Wild with Jesse LaVercombe and Seth Bockley and performed in it along with Moneka Arabic Jazz. In 2024, the play was nominated for five Dora Awards (including Outstanding New Play and Best Leading Performer for Moneka's performance), and it won the Dora Award for Outstanding Sound Design/Composition. In 2025, he appeared in the film Honey Bunch.

In 2026, Moneka co-wrote It's a Good Life If You Don't Weaken, a Tragically Hip musical about an exiled Iraqi journalist who settles in Canada. The musical was produced by Michael Rubinoff and David and Hannah Mirvish.
