= Dora Mavor Moore Award for Best Leading Actress (General Theatre) =

Award celebrating achievements in live Canadian theatre

The Dora Mavor Moore Award for Outstanding Performance by a Female in a Principal Role - Play is an annual award celebrating achievements in live Canadian theatre.

The award was discontinued after 2018, and merged with the award for Best Leading Actor (General Theatre) into a single gender-neutral award for Best Leading Performer (General Theatre).

== Awards and nominations ==
Year	Winner	Nominated
1981	Roberta Maxwell, Stevie	Michelle Fisk, Loose Ends; Lynne Griffin, Arms and the Man; Joanne McIntyre, The Crackwalker
1982	Rosemary Dunsmore, Straight Ahead/Blind Dancers	Clare Coulter, Blood Relations; Jennifer Phipps, Filumena; Fiona Reid, Night and Day
1983	Jennifer Phipps, Sister Mary Ignatius Explains It All For You	Margot Dionne, What Is to Be Done?; Mary Haney, Translations; Martha Henry, The Crucible
1984	Martha Burns, Trafford Tanzi	Jackie Burroughs, White Biting Dog; Rosemary Dunsmore, Single; Barbara Gordon, The Dining Room; Kate Trotter, Top Girls
1985	Doris Petrie, 'night, Mother	Thuli Dumakude, Poppie Nongena; Louise Philippe, De beaux gestes/Beautiful Deeds; Jennifer Phipps, L'Amante anglaise; Nora McLellan, Uncle Vanya
1986	Martha Burns, The Miracle Worker	Nancy Beatty, The Wedding Script; Nora McLellan, Farther West; Patricia Phillips, And a Nightingale Sang; Joanna Schellenberg, The Miracle Worker
1987	Lally Cadeau, Saturday Sunday Monday	Patricia Collins, Pack of Lies; Susan Coyne, Aunt Dan and Lemon; Deborah Kipp, Talley & Son; Djanet Sears, Other Female Parts
1988	Susan Wright, A Lie of the Mind	Clare Coulter, Peggy's Song; Diane D'Aquila, Nothing Sacred; Brooke Johnson, Toronto, Mississippi; Nancy Palk, I Am Yours
1989	Tanja Jacobs, Under the Skin	Patricia Conolly, The Road to Mecca; Seana McKenna, The Road to Mecca; Kate Nelligan, Spoils of War; Brenda Robins, My Memories of You
1990	Nancy Beatty, Love and Anger	Marianne Copithorne, Laughing Wild; Tanja Jacobs, The Man I Love; Melody Johnson, The Europeans; Kate Trotter, The Father
1991	Seana McKenna, Saint Joan	Robin Craig, A Fertile Imagination; Nicola Lipman, Clutching the Heat; Fiona Reid, Daylight Saving; Tracy Wright, Lion in the Streets
1992	Nicola Cavendish, Shirley Valentine	Sylvie Drapeau, Elvire Jouvet 40; Seana McKenna, Three Sisters; Kate Trotter, Summer and Smoke; Janet Wright, Not Wanted on the Voyage
1993	Fiona Reid, Fallen Angels	Hazel Desbarats, Fallen Angels; Rosemary Dunsmore, Fallen Angels; Jani Lauzon, Whale; Chick Reid, Crimes of the Heart
1994	Brenda Robins, Dancing at Lughnasa	Michelle Fisk, Homeward Bound; Tanja Jacobs, Abundance; Nancy Palk, Dancing at Lughnasa; Maria Ricossa, The Taming of the Shrew
1995	Fiona Reid, Six Degrees of Separation	Janet-Laine Green, Transit of Venus; Rita Howell, The Wooden Hill; Joan Orenstein, Transit of Venus; Fiona Reid, Hay Fever
1996	Nicola Cavendish, Later Life	Anne-Marie Cadieux, The Seven Streams of the River Ota; Joan Heney, The Misfit; Yanna McIntosh, A Midsummer Night's Dream; Nancy Palk, The Glorious 12th
1997	Lilo Baur, The Three Lives of Lucie Cabrol	Marion Gilsenan, Thirteen Hands; Sarah Goggin, Oliver Twist; Rochelle Oliver, Death of a Salesman; Fiona Reid, Arcadia
1998	Kristen Thomson, Problem Child	Brenda Bazinet, The End of Civilization; Colombe Demers, Romeo and Juliet; Maggie Huculak, Beating Heart Cadaver; Nancy Palk, Molly Sweeney; Fiona Reid, A Delicate Balance
1999	Nancy Beatty, Risk Everything	Maja Ardal, Kilt; Martha Burns, The Memory of Water; Nicola Cavendish, Les Belles soeurs; Nancy Palk, Don Carlos
2000	Nora McLellan, Music for Contortionist	Linda Griffiths, Alien Creature; Rita Lafontaine, Encore une fois, si vous permettez; Yanna McIntosh, Belle; Jane Spidell, Motel Helene
2001	Kristen Thomson, I, Claudia	Susan Coyne, An Acre of Time; Denise Clarke, Thunderstruck; Seana McKenna, Wit; Brenda Robins, Slavs
2002	Yanna McIntosh, Skylight	Marie-Hélène Fontaine, Plan B; Caroline Gillis, You Are Here; Tanja Jacobs, Elisa's Skin; Yanna McIntosh, Belle; Fiona Reid, Indian Ink; Brenda Robins, The Bald Soprano; Jenny Young, The Shape of a Girl
2003	Kristina Nicoll, Girl in the Goldfish Bowl	Rosemary Dunsmore, The Domino Heart; Kate Hennig, The Danish Play; Brooke Johnson, The Gwendolyn Poems; Mary Krohnert, The Miracle Worker
2004	Caroline Cave, The Syringa Tree	Martha Burns, Happy Days; Nicola Lipman, Simpl; Yanna McIntosh, The Syringa Tree; Jane Spidell, Blood; d'bi young, da kink in my hair
2005	Irene Poole, The Leisure Society	Marie-Hélène Fontaine, Le Collier d'Hélène; Carolyn Hetherington, Half Life; Melody Johnson, Trout Stanley; Alison Sealy-Smith, Cast Iron
2006	d'bi young, blood.claat — one womban story	Christine Brubaker, The Amorous Servant; Martha MacIsaac, The Wild Duck; Yanna McIntosh, The Monument; Karen Robinson, Two Can Play
2007	Seana McKenna, Orpheus Descending	Caroline Cave, John and Beatrice; Diane D'Aquila, Leaving Home; Meg Roe, Lucy; Kristen Thomson, The Chairs
2008	Lally Cadeau, Rose	Megan Follows, Three Sisters; Megan Follows, Top Girls; Kelli Fox, Top Girls; Arsinée Khanjian, The Palace of the End; Nicola Lipman, The December Man
2009	Alison Sealy-Smith, A Raisin in the Sun	Monica Dottor, Scratch; Nicola Lipman, Another Home Invasion; Abena Malika, A Raisin in the Sun; Waneta Storms, The Patient Hour
2010	Tara Rosling, If We Were Birds	Laura de Carteret, Hamlet; Tara Nicodemo, Hamlet; Anusree Roy, Letters to My Grandma; Michaela Washburn, Such Creatures
2011	Yanna McIntosh, Ruined	Michelle Monteith, Blasted; Anusree Roy, Brothel #9; Pamela Mala Sinha, Brothel #9; Jane Spidell, Peggy Pickit Sees the Face of God - The Africa Trilogy
2012	Pamela Mala Sinha, Crash	Maev Beaty, The Happy Woman; Christine Horne, Andromache; Nicole Underhay, The Small Room at the Top of the Stairs; Michaela Washburn, White Biting Dog
2013	Irene Poole, The Little Years	Maev Beaty, Proud; Maev Beaty, Terminus; Clare Coulter, LEAR; Melody Johnson, Miss Caledonia
2014	Carly Street, Venus in Fur	Lesley Faulkner, Lungs; Holly Lewis, Tribes; Nancy Palk, Angels in America: Perestroika; Fiona Reid, Entertaining Mr Sloane
2015	Nicky Guadagni, Hooked	Maev Beaty, The De Chardin Project; Rosemary Dunsmore, Tom at the Farm; Alanna Hibbert, The Mountaintop; Fiona Reid, Vanya and Sonia and Masha and Spike
2016	Rebecca Northan, Blind Date	Valerie Buhagiar, Botticelli in the Fire and Sunday in Sodom; Sarah Dodd, Mustard; Mayko Nguyen, Salt-Water Moon; Anusree Roy, Bombay Black
2017	Maev Beaty, The Last Wife	Lisa Berry, Father Comes Home From the Wars (Parts I, II, III); Diane Flacks, Body Politic; Katherine Gauthier, A Doll's House; Shruti Kothari, Little Pretty and the Exceptional
2018	Michaela Washburn, Confederation & Riel	Vivien Endicott-Douglas, Lo (or Dear Mr. Wells); Seana McKenna, Lear; Brenda Robins, A Delicate Balance; Michaela Washburn, Scandal & Rebellion
