= Maev Beaty =

Canadian actress

- Born: 1977 (age 48–49)

Maev Beaty (born 1977) is a Canadian film, television, stage, and voice actress, best known for her stage roles at the Stratford Festival.

Originally from eastern Ontario, she grew up in Kingston, she studied drama at the University of Toronto.

== Personal life ==
She is married to Canadian theatre director, playwright, and teacher Alan Dilworth.

== Credits ==
=== Film and television ===
- Mouthpiece (2018) - Elaine
- Murdoch Mysteries (2021) - Dr. Laura Kingston
- Nurses (2021)
- Avatar: Frontiers of Pandora (2023) - Anufi (voice)
- Dream Scenario (2023) - Naomi
- Beau Is Afraid (2023) - Narrator for traveling actor group "The Orphans of the Forest"
- Black Phone 2 (2025) - Barbara

=== Stage ===
- Angel's Trumpet (2001)
- Dance of the Red Skirts (2008)
- Palace of the End (2008) - American soldier
- Parfumerie (2009) - Miss Ratz/Shop Patron
- Montparnasse (2009) - Amelia
- The Mill, Part 1: Now We Are Brodie (2009) - Rebecca Jessup
- The Mill, Part 2: The Huron Bride (2009) - Rebecca Jessup
- Birnam Wood (2010) - Tree of Dreams
- GLO (2010) - Miriam
- Peggy Pickit Sees the Face of God (2010) - Carol
- Wide Awake Hearts (2010) - D
- The Mill, Part 4: Ash (2011) - Beaver
- The Penelopiad (2012) - Laertes/Maid
- The Happy Woman (2012) - Cassie
- Terminus (2012) - A
- Proud (2012) - Jisbella Lyth
- La Ronde (2013) - Isobel
- Antigone Dead People (2013) - Antigone
- The De Chardin Project (2014) - The Guide
- King Lear (2014) - Goneril
- A Midsummer Night's Dream (2015) - Hippolyta
- The Last Wife (2015) - Kate
- Bunny (2016) - Sorrel
- The School for Scandal (2017) - Lady Sneerwell
- Secret Life of a Mother (2018)
- Orlando (2018) - Sasha
- The Front Page (2019)
- Tartuffe (2019) - Elmire
- Little Menace: Pinter Plays (2019)
- August: Osage County (2019) - Barbara Fordham
- Hamlet (2022) - Gertrude
- Death and the King's Horseman (2022) - Jane Pilkings
- Letters from Max (2023) - Sarah
- My Name Is Lucy Barton (2024) - Lucy Barton

== Awards ==
Award	Year	Category	Work	Result	Ref.
Dora Mavor Moore Awards	2008	Outstanding Performance by a Female, Independent Theatre	Dance of the Red Skirts	Nominated	
Dora Mavor Moore Awards	2011	Outstanding New Play or Musical, Independent Theatre	Montparnasse with Erin Shields, Andrea Donaldson	Nominated	
Dora Mavor Moore Awards	2012	Best Leading Actress, General Theatre	The Happy Woman	Nominated	
Dora Mavor Moore Awards	2013	Best Leading Actress, General Theatre	Proud	Nominated	
Dora Mavor Moore Awards	2013	Best Leading Actress, General Theatre	Terminus	Nominated	
Dora Mavor Moore Awards	2015	Best Leading Actress, General Theatre	The De Chardin Project	Nominated	
Dora Mavor Moore Awards	2017	Best Leading Actress, General Theatre	The Last Wife	Won	
Dora Mavor Moore Awards	2019	Best Leading Performer, General Theatre	Secret Life of a Mother	Nominated	
Dora Mavor Moore Awards	2019	Best Original Play, General Theatre	Secret Life of a Mother with Hannah Moscovitch, Anne-Marie Kerr	Nominated	
Dora Mavor Moore Awards	2020	Best Leading Performer, General Theatre	August: Osage County	Nominated	
Toronto Theatre Critics Awards	2013	Best Supporting Performance in a Play	Proud	Won	
