= Jennifer Phipps =

Canadian actress (1932–2019)

Jennifer Phipps (born Jennifer Maude, April 16, 1932 – April 18, 2019) was a Canadian actress best known for her work on stage.

== Early years ==
Phipps was born out of wedlock to Elizabeth Maude in Marylebone, London, England, and "kind of tucked away," said a long-time friend. Two sisters adopted her, and she had regular contact with her mother and grandmother but was not permitted to recognize them in those roles. She first learned her father's name during an audition when, after hearing her mother's and grandmother's names, the director said, "Oh, you're Martin Walker's child."

Phipps graduated from the Royal Academy of Dramatic Art in London.

== Career ==
While in England, Phipps appeared in plays in London's West End. In the early 1960s she moved to Canada, where she worked for most of the rest of her career.

Phipps was active in the Shaw Festival at Niagara-on-the-Lake, Ontario, appearing in more than 50 productions from her debut there in 1967 through her final Festival play in 2016. Her other performances included work at the Stratford Festival in The Winter's Tale, St. Lawrence Center in Mother Courage, Theatre Calgary in The Entertainer, the Vancouver Playhouse in The Glass Menagerie and the National Arts Centre in A Touch of the Poet and Mrs. Warren's Profession.

On television, Phipps appeared in The Fifth Season (1955), Coming of Age (1993) and Anne of Green Gables: A New Beginning (2008).

== Personal life ==
Phipps was married to actor Peter Boretski, and they had two children.

== Death ==
On April 18, 2019, Phipps died in Ontario, Canada, at the age of 87.

== Recognition ==
Phipps' debut performance in the Stratford Festival in 1969 led to her winning the Tyrone Guthrie Award. In 1977, Phipps won an award from the Montreal Star for her acting, and in 1983, she received a Dora Mavor Moore Award for Outstanding Performance by a Female in a Principal Role – Play for her performance in Sister Mary Ignatius Explains It All For You at the Tarragon Theatre in Toronto.

At the 9th Gemini Awards in 1995, she won the award for Best Supporting Actress in a Drama Program or Series for her performance in the television film Coming of Age.
