= Roseneath Theatre =

Non-profit theatre for young audiences

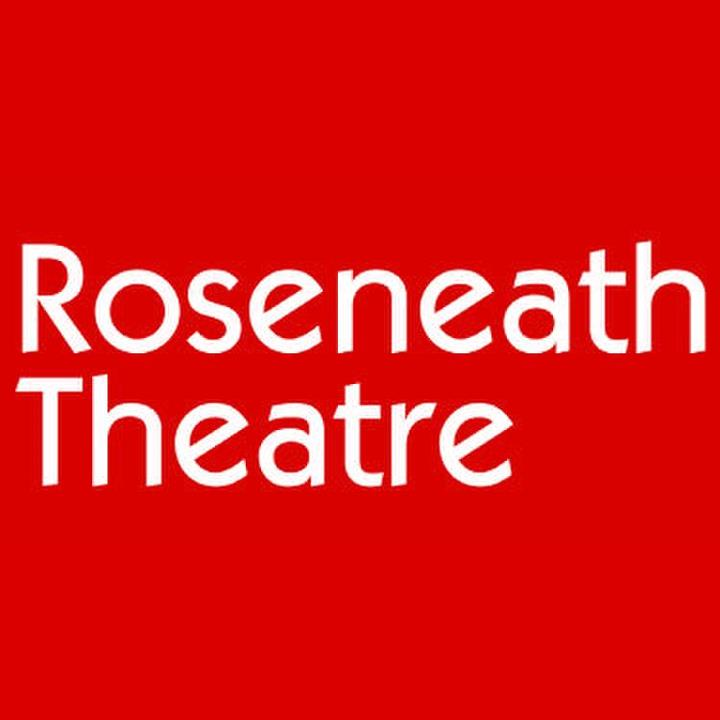
- Driving theatre for young audiences forward.
- Address: 651 Dufferin Street; Toronto; Canada
- Type: theatre

Construction
- Opened: 1983

Website
- www.roseneath.ca

Roseneath Theatre is a not-for-profit theatre specializing in work for Young Audiences (TYA) which is officed in downtown Toronto but tours its productions to schools grades JK-12 across the province of Ontario. They have also been to the far North of Canada, the United States and to parts of Europe and Asia. The company was founded in 1983 by David S. Craig and Robert Morgan, who served as co-artistic directors until 2002, when David S. Craig assumed the role singularly. David was succeeded by Andrew Lamb in 2010. Andrew is the current artistic director.

Originally managed by General Manager Susan Habkirk, Susan was succeeded in 1999 by Tim Jennings when Ms Habkirk assumed the mantle of executive director at Prologue to the Performing Arts. Mr Jennings acted as managing director from 2000 to 2008, when he left to take on the role of managing director at Seattle Children's Theatre (2008–2012) and later Children's Theatre Company in Minneapolis, MN (2011 – 2015 – a family theatre and the Shaw Festival (2015–present). Tim was succeeded by General Manager Natalie Ackers in 2008. Natalie is the current general manager.

Roseneath Theatre works with Canadian playwrights to develop plays which address issues of social justice and character development for young audiences. Roseneath Theatre works with talent from the Canadian Actor’s Equity Association. Directors have included Jim Warren, Richard Greenblatt, Greg Banks, and others. They were nominated for the 2012 Ontario Premier’s Award of Excellence in the Arts, they have also been nominated for 26 Dora Awards and have won 11. They have received the Chalmer's play award 3 times.

== Productions ==
Original Canadian works produced by Roseneath Theatre:

- Danny, King Of The Basement – by David S. Craig
- Dib And Dob And The Journey Home – by David S. Craig and Robert Morgan
- Get Yourself Home Skyler James – by Jordan Tannahill
- Head À Tête – by David S. Craig and Robert Morgan
- Health Class By Men – written and performed by David S. Craig and Robert Morgan
- Health Class By Women – by Martha Ross
- In This World – by Hannah Moscovitch
- Morgan’s Journey – written by Robert Morgan and David S. Craig
- Napalm The Magnificent: Dancing With The Dark – written and performed by David S. Craig
- Rocket And The Queen Of Dreams – by David S. Craig
- Smokescreen – by David S. Craig
- Spirit Horse – by Greg Banks /adapted By Drew Hayden Taylor
- The Book Of Miracles – Written and performed by David S. Craig and Robert Morgan
- The Health Class – written and Performed by David S. Craig and Robert Morgan
- The Incredible Speediness Of Jamie Cavanaugh – by Chris Craddock
- The Neverending Story – by David S. Craig
- Tough Case – by David S. Craig
- Wrecked – by Chris Craddock
