= Prince Hamlet =

Protagonist of Hamlet

- Hamlet character
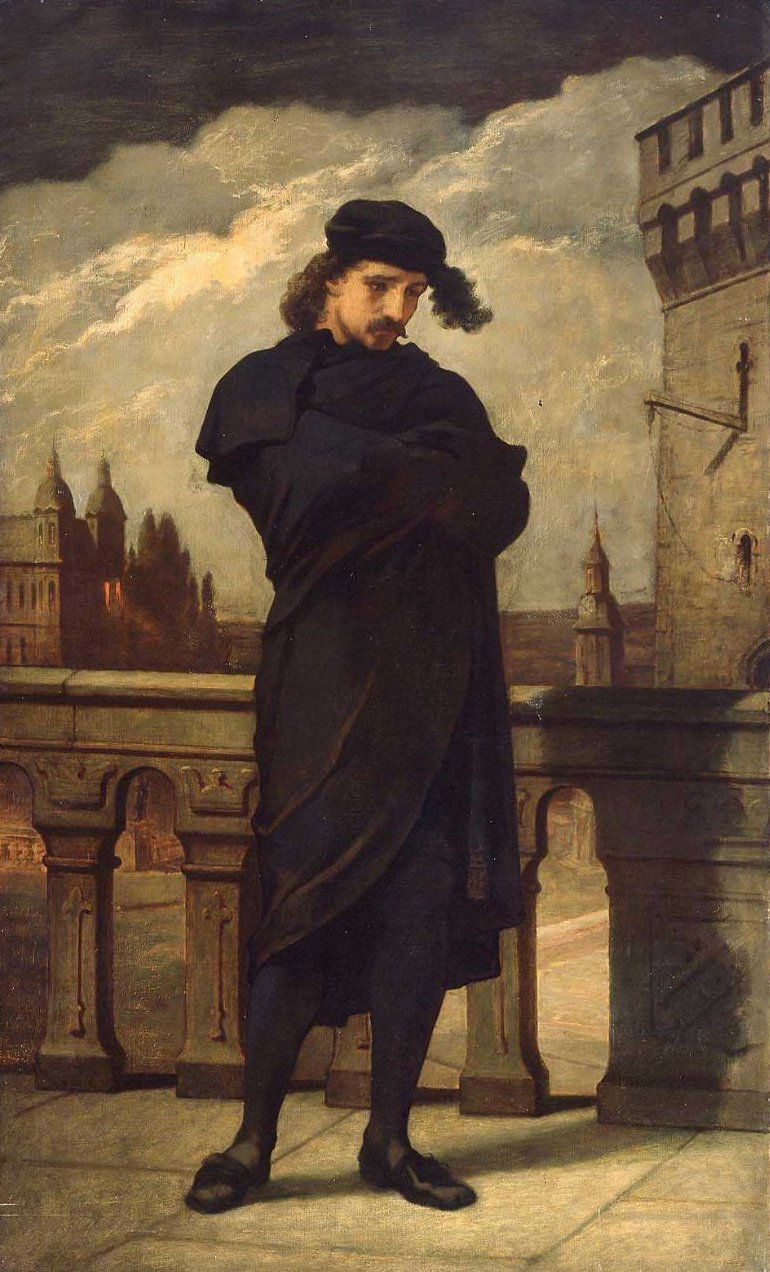
- Portrait of Hamlet by William Morris Hunt, c. 1864
- Created by: William Shakespeare
- Based on: Amleth
- Portrayed by: Richard Burbage; David Garrick; Mrs Powell; Master Betty; Edwin Booth; Sir Henry Irving; Barry Sullivan; Johnston Forbes-Robertson; John Barrymore; Sarah Bernhardt; John Gielgud; Maurice Evans; Gustaf Gründgens; Laurence Olivier; Paul Scofield; Richard Burton; David Warner; Richard Chamberlain; Vladimir Vysotsky; Derek Jacobi; Christopher Walken; Mark Rylance; Daniel Day-Lewis; Kenneth Branagh; Richard Roxburgh; Ralph Fiennes; Samuel West; Christopher Eccleston; David Tennant; Andrew Scott; Asta Nielsen; Innokenty Smoktunovsky; Nicol Williamson; Mel Gibson; Iain Glen; Ethan Hawke; Richard Pyros; Christopher Plummer; George MacKay; Amaka Umeh

In-universe information
- Title: Prince of Denmark
- Occupation: University student
- Weapon: Rapier
- Family: King Hamlet (father; deceased); Gertrude (mother/aunt); Claudius (uncle/stepfather)
- Significant other: Ophelia
- Religion: Christianity; ambiguous as to whether a Catholic or Protestant
- Nationality: Danish

Prince Hamlet is the title character and protagonist of William Shakespeare's tragedy Hamlet (1599–1601). He is the Prince of Denmark, nephew of the usurping Claudius, and son of King Hamlet, the previous King of Denmark. At the beginning of the play, he is conflicted whether, and how, to avenge the murder of his father, and struggles with his own sanity along the way. By the end of the tragedy, Hamlet has caused the deaths of Polonius, Laertes, Claudius, and Rosencrantz and Guildenstern, two acquaintances of his from childhood. He is also indirectly involved in the deaths of his love Ophelia (drowning) and of his mother Gertrude (mistakenly poisoned by Claudius).

== Role in the play ==
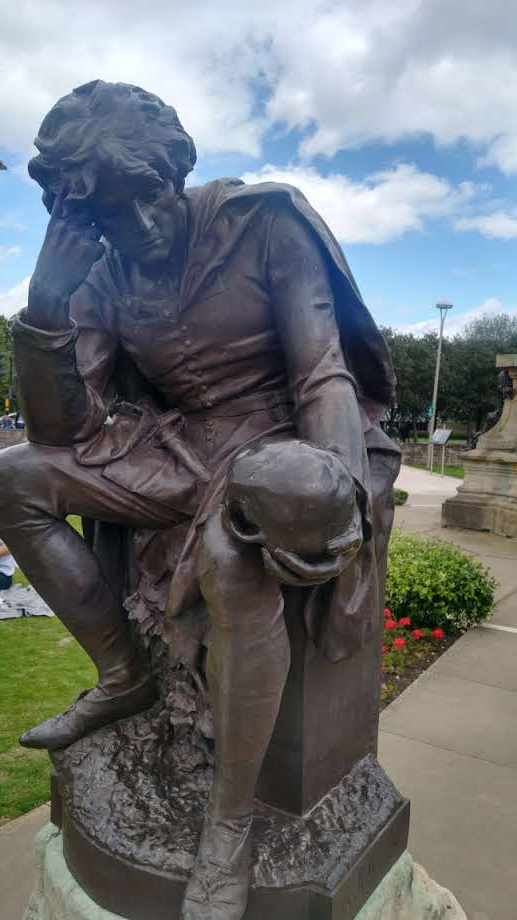
A statue of Hamlet with the skull of Yorick in Stratford-upon-Avon

The play opens with Hamlet deeply depressed over the recent death of his father, King Hamlet, and his uncle Claudius' ascension to the throne and hasty marriage to Hamlet's mother Gertrude. One night, his father's ghost appears to him and tells him that Claudius murdered him in order to usurp the throne, and commands his son to avenge his death.

Claudius sends for two of Hamlet's friends from Wittenberg to find out what is causing Hamlet so much pain. Claudius and his advisor Polonius persuade Ophelia—Polonius' daughter and Hamlet's love interest—to speak with Hamlet while they secretly listen. Hamlet enters, contemplating suicide ("To be, or not to be"). Ophelia greets him, and offers to return his remembrances (tokens of his love interest), upon which Hamlet questions her honesty and tells her to "get thee to a nunnery" (a suggestion of either erotic criticism of hypersexuality, or of escape from the Danish succession crisis that will become bloody.)

Hamlet devises a test to see whether Claudius is guilty: he hires a group of actors to perform a play about the murder of a king in front of the royal court, and has Horatio gauge Claudius' reaction. Claudius demands the play be stopped half through because it causes him to experience guilt. When Claudius leaves the on stage "audience" deeply upset, Hamlet knows that the ghost was telling the truth. He follows Claudius into his chambers in order to kill him, but stops when he sees his uncle praying; he does not want to kill Claudius while he is in a state of grace because Hamlet wants Claudius to suffer in purgatory and Claudius has just attempted to cleanse his sin through confession. A second attempt on Claudius' life ends in Polonius' accidental death.

Claudius, now fearing for his life, sends Hamlet to England, accompanied (and closely watched) by Rosencrantz and Guildenstern. Alone, Claudius discloses that he is actually sending Hamlet to his death. Prior to embarking for England, Hamlet hides Polonius' body, ultimately revealing its location to the King. Meanwhile, the death of Ophelia's father has driven her insane with grief, and Claudius convinces Ophelia's brother Laertes that Hamlet is to blame. Claudius proposes a fencing match between the two. Laertes informs the king that he will further poison the tip of his sword so that a mere scratch would mean certain death. Claudius plans to offer Hamlet poisoned wine if that fails. Gertrude reports that Ophelia has died.

In the Elsinore churchyard, two "clowns", typically represented as gravediggers, enter to prepare Ophelia's grave. Hamlet arrives with Horatio and banters with one of them, who unearths the skull of a jester who Hamlet once knew, Yorick. Ophelia's funeral procession approaches, led by Laertes. Hamlet interrupts, professing his own love and grief for Ophelia. He and Laertes grapple, but the fight is broken up by Claudius and Gertrude.

Later that day, Hamlet tells Horatio how he escaped death on his journey, disclosing that Rosencrantz and Guildenstern have been sent to their deaths instead. A courtier, Osric, interrupts to invite Hamlet to fence with Laertes. Despite Horatio's warnings, Hamlet accepts and the match begins. After several rounds, Gertrude toasts Hamlet, accidentally drinking the wine Claudius poisoned. Between bouts, Laertes attacks and pierces Hamlet with his poisoned blade; in the ensuing scuffle, Hamlet is able to use Laertes' own poisoned sword against him. Gertrude falls and, in her dying breath, announces that she has been poisoned.

In his dying moments, Laertes reveals Claudius' plot. Hamlet stabs Claudius with the poisoned sword, and then forces him to drink from his own poisoned cup to make sure he dies. In his final moments, Hamlet names Prince Fortinbras of Norway as the probable heir to the throne. Horatio attempts to kill himself with the same poisoned wine, but is stopped by Hamlet, so he will be the only one left alive to give a full account of the story. He then wills the throne of Denmark to Fortinbras before dying.

== Views of Hamlet ==
Perhaps the most straightforward view sees Hamlet as seeking truth in order to be certain that he is justified in carrying out the revenge called for by a ghost that claims to be the spirit of his father. The 1948 film with Laurence Olivier in the title role is introduced by a voice-over: "This is the tragedy of a man who could not make up his mind."

T. S. Eliot offers a similar view of Hamlet's character in his critical essay, "Hamlet and His Problems" (The Sacred Wood: Essays on Poetry and Criticism). He states, "We find Shakespeare's 'Hamlet' not in the action, not in any quotations that we might select, so much as in an unmistakable tone...".

Others see Hamlet as a person charged with a duty that he both knows and feels is right, yet is unwilling to carry out. In this view, his efforts to satisfy himself on Claudius' guilt and his failure to act when he can are evidence of this unwillingness, and Hamlet berates himself for his inability to carry out his task. After observing a play-actor performing a scene, he notes that the actor was moved to tears in the passion of the story and compares this passion for an ancient Greek character, Hecuba, in light of his own situation:

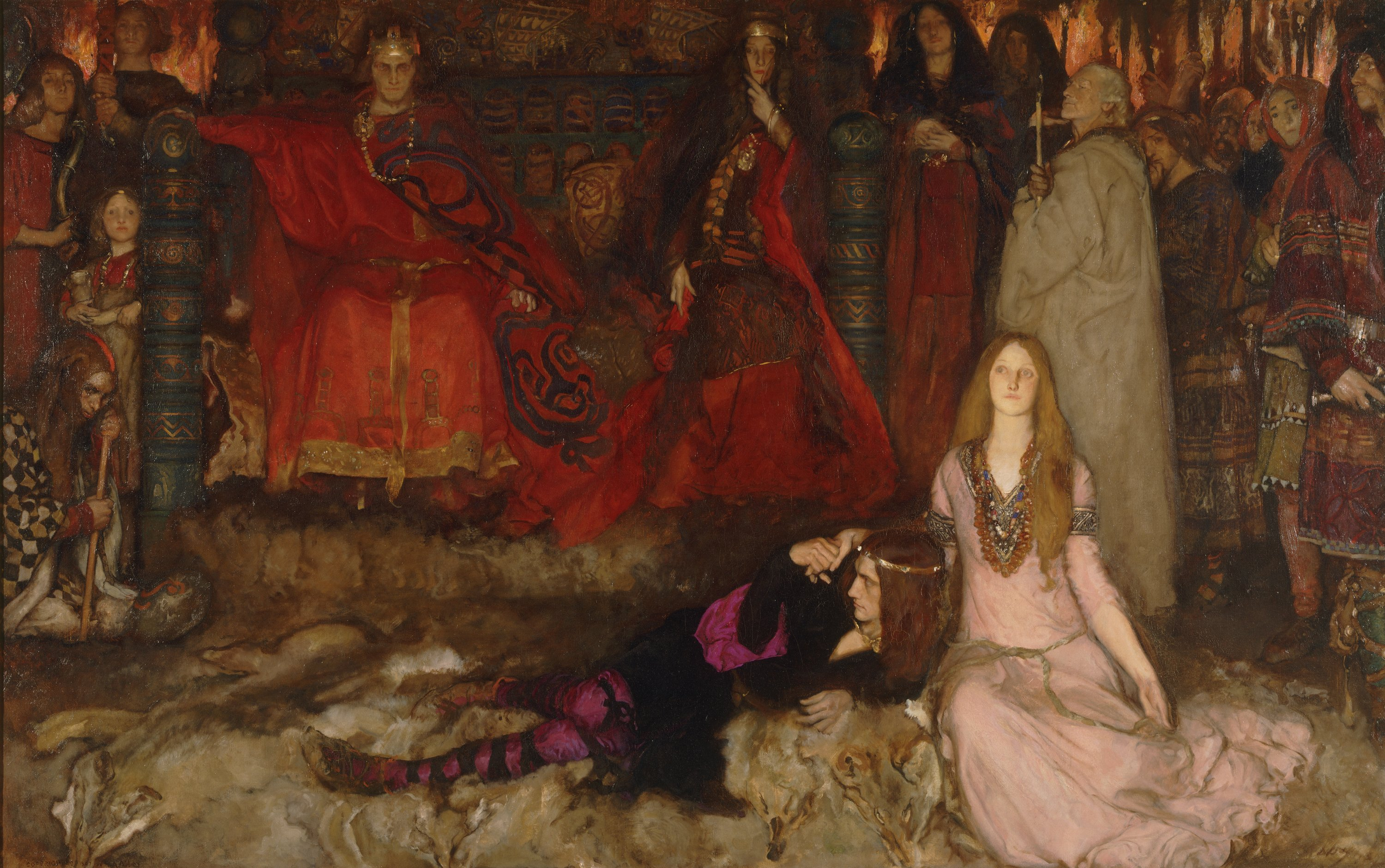
Hamlet reclines next to Ophelia in Edwin Austin Abbey's The Play Scene in Hamlet (1897)

O, what a rogue and peasant slave am I!
Is it not monstrous that this player here,
But in a fiction, in a dream of passion,
Could force his soul so to his own conceit
That from her working all his visage wan'd;
Tears in his eyes, distraction in's aspect,
A broken voice, and his whole function suiting
With forms to his conceit? And all for nothing!
For Hecuba?
What's Hecuba to him, or he to Hecuba,
That he should weep for her? Hamlet 2.2/577–587

=== Etymology of his name ===
The name Hamlet occurs in the form Amleth in a 13th-century book of Danish history written by Saxo Grammaticus, popularised by François de Belleforest as L'histoire tragique d'Hamlet, and appearing in the English translation as "Hamblet". The story of Amleth is assumed to originate in Old Norse or Icelandic poetry from several centuries earlier. Saxo has it as Amlethus, the Latin form of the old Jutish Amlethæ, In terms of etymology, the Old Icelandic name Amlóði comes from the Icelandic noun amlóði, meaning "fool", suggestive of the way that Hamlet acts in the play. Later these names were incorporated into Irish as Amlodhe. As phonetic laws took their course, the name's spelling changed, eventually arriving at Amlaidhe. This Irish name was given to a hero in a common folk story. The root of this name is 'furious, raging, wild'.

=== Influence of the Reformation ===
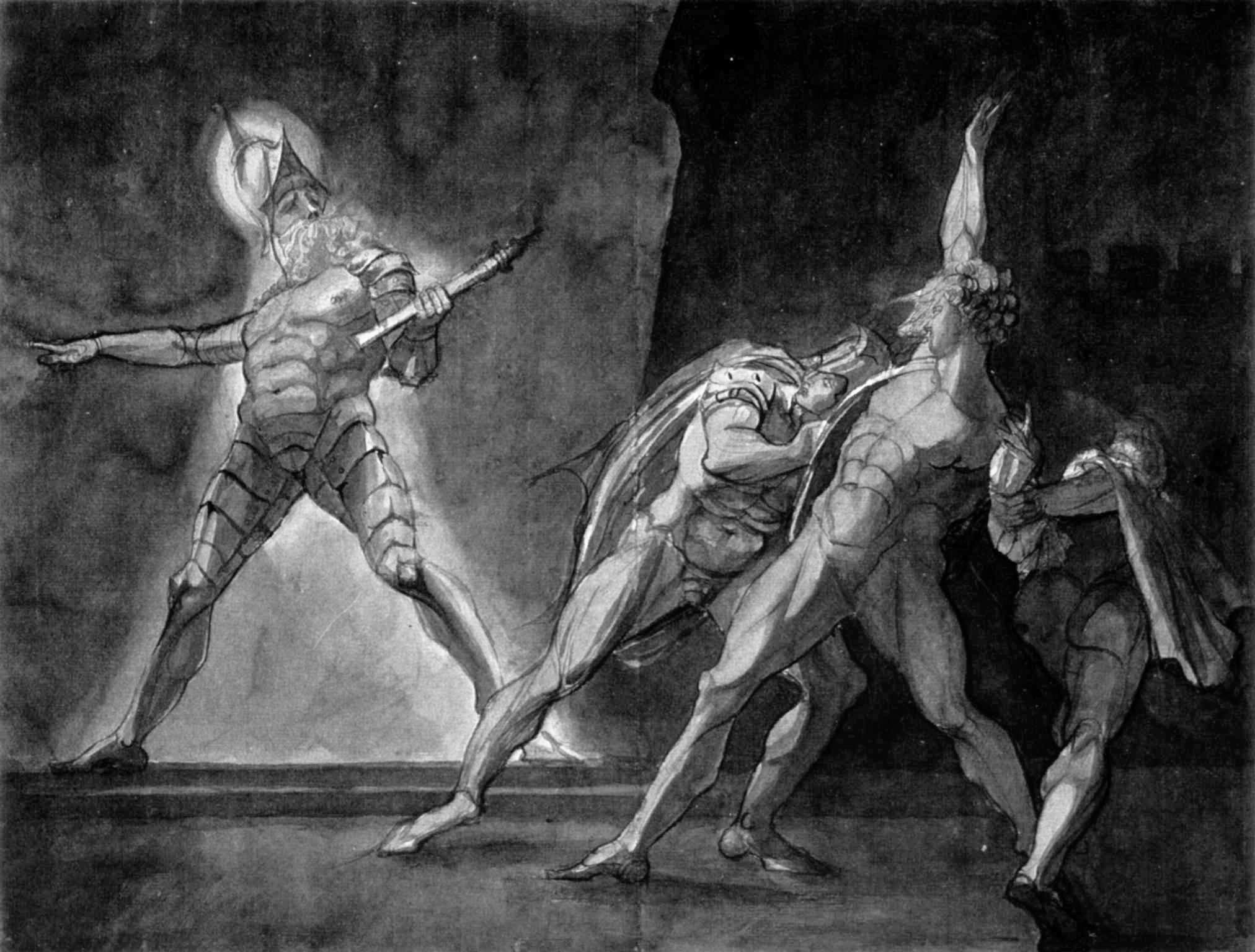
Marcellus, Horatio, Hamlet, and the Ghost by Henry Fuseli

It has also been suggested that Hamlet's hesitations may also be rooted in the religious beliefs of Shakespeare's time. The Protestant Reformation had generated debate about the existence of purgatory (where King Hamlet claims he currently resides). The concept of purgatory is a Catholic one, and was frowned on in Protestant England. Hamlet says that he will not kill his uncle because death would send him straight to heaven, while his father (having died without foreknowledge of his death) is in purgatory doing penance for his sins. Hamlet's opportunity to kill his uncle comes just after the uncle has supposedly made his peace with God. Hamlet says that he would much rather take a stab at the murderer while he is frolicking in the "incestuous sheets", or gambling and drinking, so he could be sure of his going straight to hell.

=== Freudian interpretation ===
Ernest Jones, following the work of Sigmund Freud, held that Hamlet suffered from the Oedipus complex. He said in his essay "The Oedipus-Complex as an Explanation of Hamlet's Mystery: A Study in Motive":

His moral fate is bound up with his uncle's for good or ill. The call of duty to slay his uncle cannot be obeyed because it links itself with the call of his nature to slay his mother's husband, whether this is the first or the second; the latter call is strongly "repressed," and therefore necessarily the former also.

Harold Bloom did a "Shakespearean Criticism" of Freud's work in response.

=== As a mirror of the audience ===
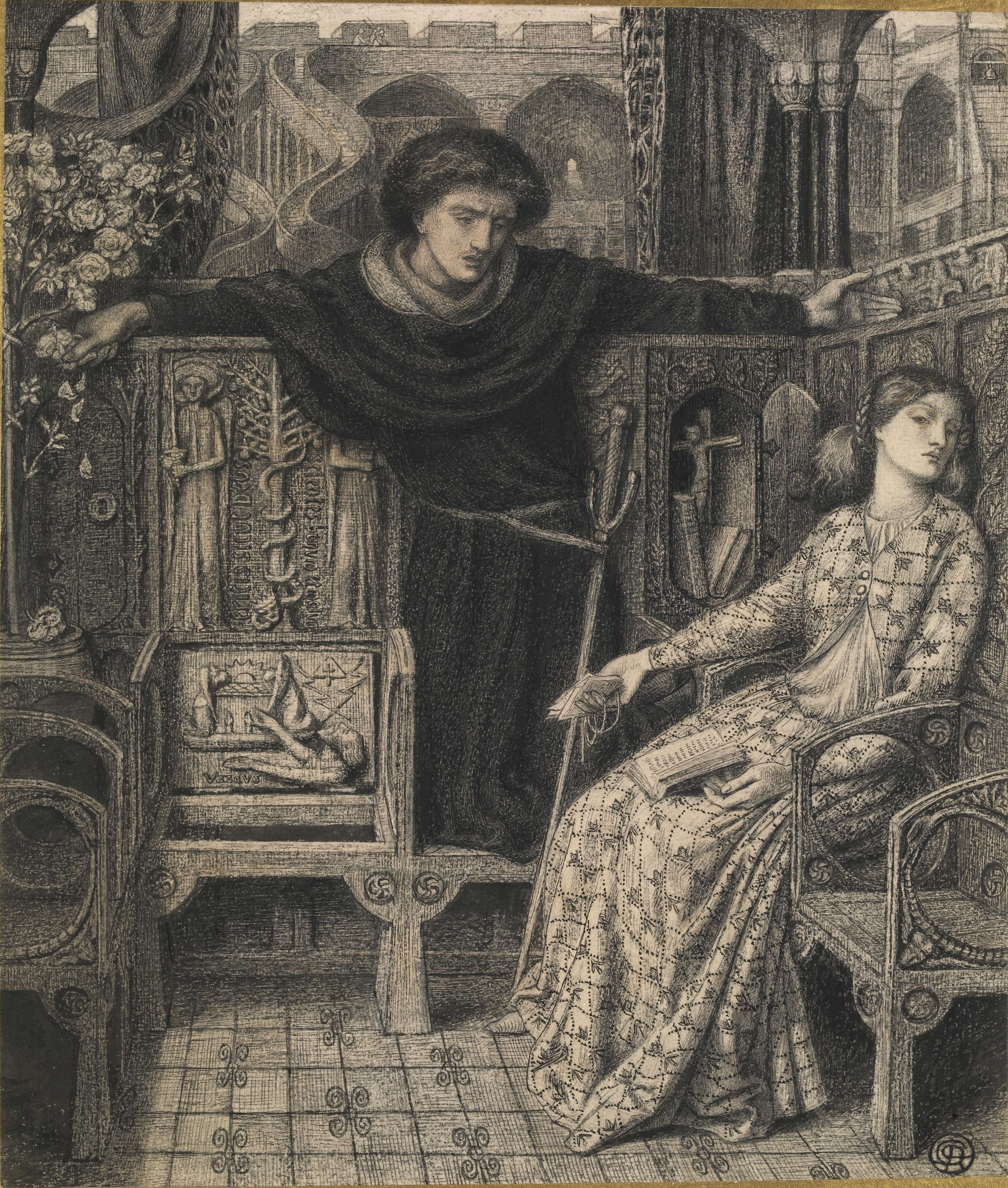
Hamlet and Ophelia, 1858, by Dante Gabriel Rossetti

It has also been suggested that Hamlet, who is described by Ophelia as "th' expectancy and rose of the fair state, / The glass of fashion and the mould of form" (Hamlet 3.1/166–167), is ultimately a reflection of all of the interpretations possessed by other characters in the play—and perhaps also by the members of an audience watching him. Polonius, most obviously, has a habit of misreading his own expectations into Hamlet's actions ("Still harping on my daughter!"), though many other characters in the play participate in analogous behaviour.

Gertrude has a similar tendency to interpret all of her son's activities as the result of her "o'erhasty marriage" alone. Rosencrantz and Guildenstern tend to find the stalled ambitions of a courtier in their former schoolmate's behaviour, whereas Claudius seems to be concerned with Hamlet's motivation only so far as it reveals the degree to which his nephew is a potential threat. Ophelia, like her father, waits in vain for Hamlet to give her signs of affection, and Horatio would have little reason to think that Hamlet was concerned with anything more pressing than the commandment of the ghost. And the First Gravedigger seems to think that Prince Hamlet, like that "whoreson mad fellow" Yorick, is simply insane without any need for explanation. Several critics, including Stephen Booth and William Empson have further investigated the analogous relationship between Hamlet, the play, and its audience.

=== Parallels with other characters ===
One aspect of Hamlet's character is the way in which he reflects other characters, including the play's primary antagonist, Claudius. In the play within a play, for instance, Gonzago, the king, is murdered in the garden by his nephew, Lucianus; although King Hamlet is murdered by his brother, in The Murder of Gonzago—which Hamlet tauntingly calls "The Mousetrap" when Claudius asks "What do you call the play?"—the regicide is a nephew, like Prince Hamlet. However, it is also worth noting that each of the characters in the play-within-a-play maps to two major characters in Hamlet, an instance of the play's many doubles:

- Lucianus, like Hamlet, is both a regicide and a nephew to the king; like Claudius, he is a regicide that operates by pouring poison into ears.
- The Player King, like Hamlet, is an erratic melancholic; like King Hamlet, his character in The Murder of Gonzago is poisoned via his ear while reclining in his orchard.
- The Player Queen, like Ophelia, attends to a character in The Murder of Gonzago that is "so far from cheer and from [a] former state"; like Gertrude, she remarries a regicide.

Hamlet is also, in some form, a reflection of most other characters in the play (or perhaps vice versa):

- Hamlet, Laertes, Fortinbras and Pyrrhus are all avenging sons. Hamlet and Laertes both blame Claudius for the death of their fathers. Hamlet and Pyrrhus are both seized by inaction at some point in their respective narratives and each avenges his father. Hamlet and Fortinbras both have plans that are thwarted by uncles that are also kings.
- Hamlet, Rosencrantz, Guildenstern, Osric and Polonius are all courtiers.
- Hamlet, his father, Bernardo, Marcellus, Francisco, Fortinbras and several other characters are all soldiers.
- Hamlet and his father share a name (as do Fortinbras and his father).
- Hamlet, Horatio, Rosencrantz, Guildenstern and Laertes are all students.
- Hamlet, his father, Gertrude and Claudius are all members of the Royal Family. Each of them is also killed by poison—poison that Claudius is responsible for.
- Hamlet and Ophelia are each rebuked by their surviving parent in subsequent scenes; the surviving parent of each happens to be of the opposite gender. Both also enter scenes reading books and there is a contrast between the (possibly) pretend madness of Hamlet and the very real insanity of Ophelia.
- Hamlet, Horatio, Polonius, Rosencrantz, Guildenstern, and Claudius are each "lawful espials" at some point in the play.

=== Hamlet's age ===
In act V, scene 1, the First Gravedigger is asked by Hamlet at about line 147 and following, how long he has "been a grave-maker". His reply appears to determine the age of Hamlet in a roundabout but very explicit manner. The Gravedigger says that he has been in his profession since the day that Old Hamlet defeated Old Fortinbras, which was "the very day that young Hamlet was born". Then, a little later, he adds that "I have been sexton here, man and boy, thirty years." According to this logic, Hamlet must be 30 years old. Yorick, the dead jester whose skull Hamlet holds during this scene, is said to have been in the earth "three-and-twenty years", which would make Hamlet no more than seven years old when he last rode on Yorick's back.

This view of Hamlet's age is supported by the fact that Richard Burbage, the actor who originally played the role, was 32 at the time of the play's premiere.

However, a case has been made that at an early stage in Hamlet—with its apparent history of multiple revisions—Hamlet was presented as a 16-year-old. Several pieces of evidence support this view. Hamlet attends the University of Wittenberg, and members of the royalty and nobility (Elizabethan or medieval Danish) did not attend university at age 30. Additionally, a 30-year-old Prince Hamlet would clearly have been of ruling age. Given his great popularity (mentioned by Claudius), this would raise the question of why it was not he, rather than his uncle, who was elected to succeed to the throne upon the death of King Hamlet.

The line about the length of the Gravedigger's career does not appear in the First Quarto of Hamlet; in that text Yorick is said to have been in the ground only twelve years. Furthermore, in Belleforest, possibly one of Shakespeare's sources for the story, it is said that Amleth has "not attained to man's estate". And in the original spelling of the First Folio (F1) text, one of the two authoritative texts for the play, the Gravedigger's answer to how long he has "been a grave-maker" reads "Why heere in Denmarke: I haue bin sixeteene heere, man and Boy thirty yeares." "Sixteene" is usually rendered as "sexton" (a modernization of the second quarto's "sexten"), even in modern texts that take F1 as their "copy text". But modernizing the punctuation—a normal practice in modernized texts—renders "Why heere in Denmarke: I haue bin sixeteene heere—man and Boy thirty yeares." In other words, this reading suggests that he has been a gravedigger for 16 years, but that he has lived in Denmark for 30. According to this logic, then, it is the Gravedigger who is 30, whereas Hamlet is only 16.

However, the difference between a sexton and a grave digger must also be taken into account. A sexton oversees many different jobs around the church and surrounding areas. A grave digger simply digs graves. There are sextons who also dig graves and some that do not. It is completely possible that the Gravedigger has been a sexton for 30 years, but has not been digging graves for that entire time. This could be another example of the character's very round-about way of speaking.

However, this reading has the disadvantage that in the Folio the length of time Yorick has been in the ground is said to be twenty-three years, meaning that he had been dead seven years by the time Hamlet was born. Another theory offered is that the play was originally written with the view that Hamlet was 16 or 17, but since Shakespeare wrote his plays to be performed, not read, these lines were likely changed so Burbage (who was almost always the protagonist in Shakespeare's plays) could play the role.

=== Performers ===
The day we see Hamlet die in the theatre, something of him dies for us. He is dethroned by the spectre of an actor, and we shall never be able to keep the usurper out of our dreams.

— Maurice Maeterlinck (1890).

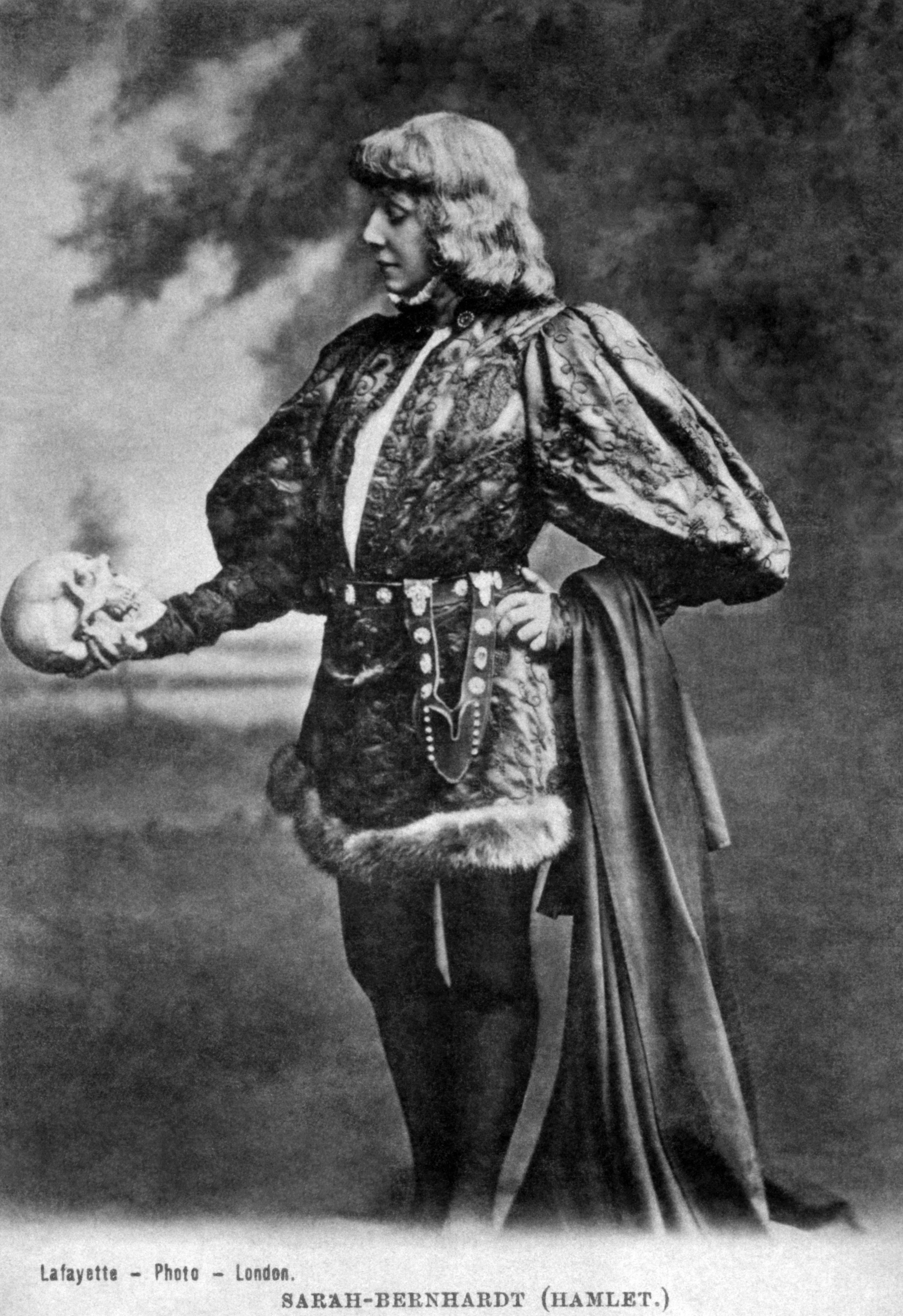
Sarah Bernhardt as Hamlet, 1880–1885

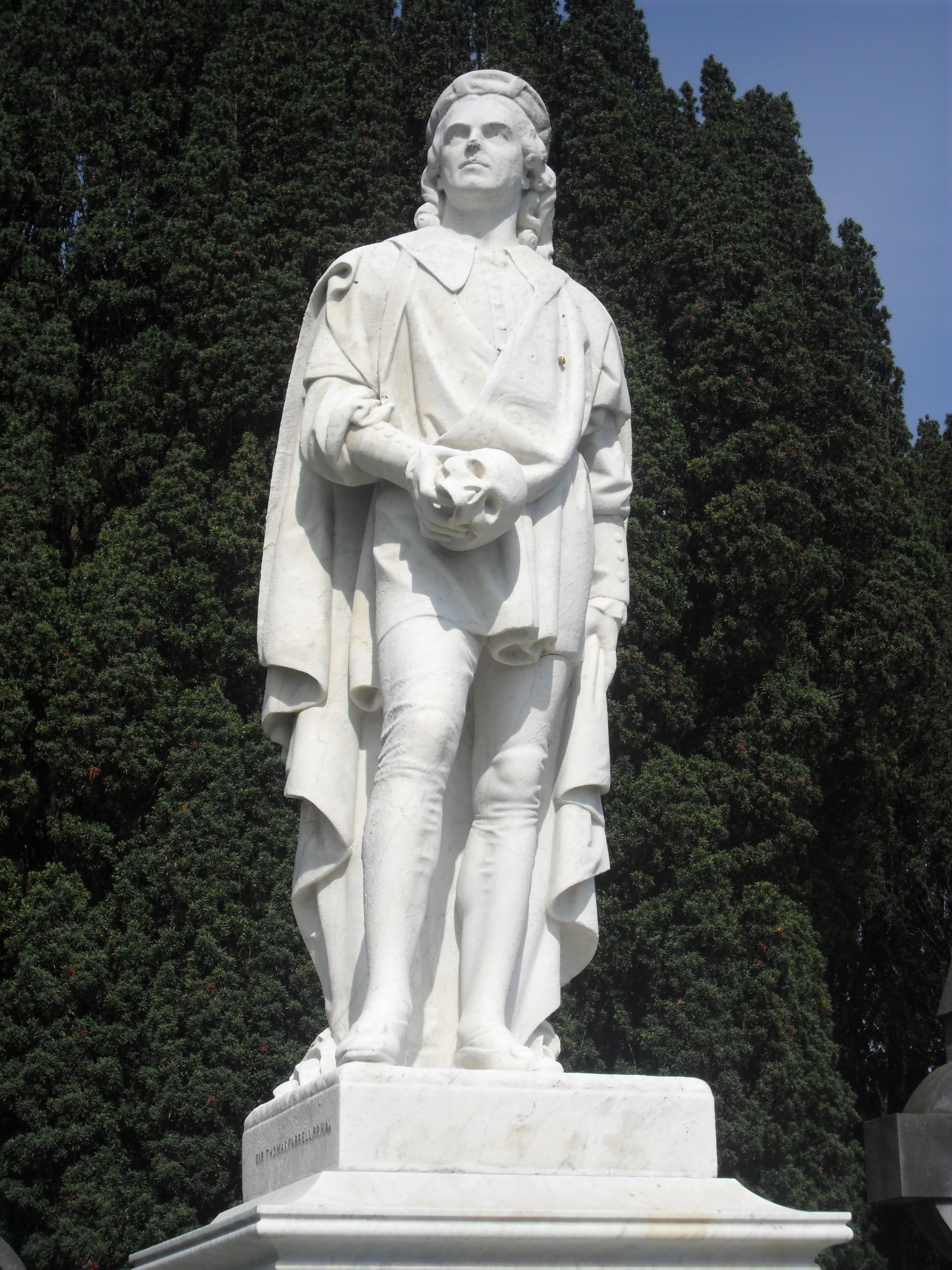
Barry Sullivan's burial site in Glasnevin Cemetery, Dublin, with a statue of Sullivan in character as Hamlet, 1891

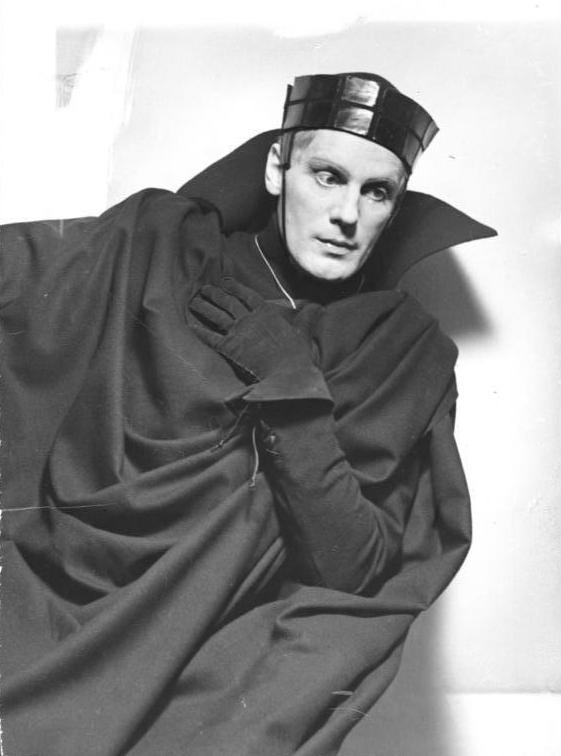
Gustaf Gründgens as Hamlet, 1936

Below are listed some of the notable acting portrayals of Hamlet.

Stage

- Richard Burbage is assumed to have originated the role of Hamlet at the Globe Theatre.
- David Garrick made the role one of the centerpieces of his repertory in the 18th century.
- Mrs Powell was the first woman to appear in the role in London in 1796.
- Master Betty played the role at the height of his popularity in 1805, and the House of Commons once adjourned early so that members of Parliament could see him play it.
- Edwin Booth was famous for the role in New York City in the 1860s and 1870s.
- Sir Henry Irving, the first actor to be knighted, played Hamlet for an unprecedented 200 consecutive performances at the Lyceum Theatre in London in 1874.
- Barry Sullivan played the role in the Victorian era; he was depicted in character in a statue on his grave.
- Johnston Forbes-Robertson played the role in 1898.
- John Barrymore created a sensation with his performance on Broadway in 1922 and again when he took it to London in 1925.
- John Gielgud played Hamlet over 500 times between 1930 and 1945.
- Maurice Evans first played the part at the Old Vic theatre in 1935 and had a triumph on Broadway in 1938 and 1945.
- Gustaf Gründgens played Hamlet at the Theater am Gendarmenmarkt in Berlin in 1936.
- Laurence Olivier first played Hamlet at the Old Vic in 1937, later performing the production at Elsinore Castle.
- Paul Scofield played Hamlet at the Royal Shakespeare Company in 1948 and again in 1955, directed by Peter Brook.
- Richard Burton first played the role at the Old Vic Theatre in 1953 and returned to it in a 1964 Broadway production that became notorious when he married Elizabeth Taylor during its out-of-town tryout.
- David Warner starred in Peter Hall's Hamlet in the Royal Shakespeare Company's August 1965 production at Stratford-Upon-Avon.
- Richard Chamberlain was the first American actor to play the role in London since John Barrymore. This occurred in the late 1960s, immediately after the run of Dr. Kildare, the TV series in which Chamberlain first made his name, ended.
- Vladimir Vysotsky played Hamlet in Moscow's Taganka Theatre between 1971 and 1980.
- Derek Jacobi played the role for the Prospect Theatre Company in 1977.
- Christopher Walken played the role for the American Shakespeare Theatre in 1982.
- Mark Rylance played the role for the Royal Shakespeare Company in 1988 and for Shakespeare's Globe in 2000.
- Daniel Day-Lewis played Hamlet at the Royal National Theatre in 1989 before he broke down on stage midway through a performance during the scene where the ghost of Hamlet's father appears before him. He was replaced by Jeremy Northam who gave a triumphant performance. Ian Charleson formally replaced Day-Lewis for the rest of the run.
- Kenneth Branagh played the role for the Royal Shakespeare Company in 1992.
- Richard Roxburgh played Hamlet at Belvoir St Theatre's 1994/95 touring production, opposite Geoffrey Rush (Horatio), Jacqueline McKenzie/Cate Blanchett (Ophelia), David Wenham (Laertes), directed by Neil Armfield.
- Ralph Fiennes won the Best Actor Tony Award in 1995 for his portrayal.
- Samuel West played Hamlet for the Royal Shakespeare Company in 2001–02 and won the Critic's Circle Award.
- Christopher Eccleston played the role for the West Yorkshire Playhouse in 2002.
- Toby Stephens played the role for the Royal Shakespeare Company in 2004.
- Ben Whishaw played the role for the Old Vic in 2004.
- Robert Roth played the role in the Slovak National Theatre in Bratislava in 2007.
- Michael Stuhlbarg played the role for The Public Theater in 2008.
- David Tennant played the role for the Royal Shakespeare Company in 2008–09.
- Christian Camargo played the role for the Theatre for a New Audience in 2009, for which he won an Obie Award.
- Jude Law played the role for the Donmar Warehouse, West End, and later on Broadway.
- Michael Brando (grandson of Marlon Brando) played the role for a special TED event in 2010; he had played the role previously in 2008–09.
- Michael Sheen played the role at the Young Vic in 2011–12.
- Gustaf Skarsgård played Hamlet in Stockholm City Theatre's Hamlet in 2010.
- Christian Friedel played Hamlet for the Staatsschauspiel Dresden from 2012 until 2019.
- Maxine Peake played Hamlet at the Royal Exchange, Manchester in 2014.
- Benedict Cumberbatch played Hamlet at the Barbican Centre in London in 2015.
- Paapa Essiedu plays the role for the Royal Shakespeare Company in 2016.
- Andrew Scott played Hamlet at the Almeida Theatre, directed by Robert Icke in 2016, transferred to the West End's Harold Pinter Theatre in 2017.
- Tom Hiddleston played Hamlet at the Royal Academy of Dramatic Art, directed by Kenneth Branagh in 2017.
- Oscar Isaac played Hamlet at The Public Theater, New York City, in 2017.
- Ruth Negga played Hamlet during the 2018 Dublin Theatre Festival.
- Christine Horne played Hamlet in a 2019 theatre tour in Canada for Why Not Theatre.
- Amaka Umeh was the first Black actor and first genderfluid performer to play Hamlet at the Stratford Festival in Canada, first for a special performance for the FreeUp! Emancipation Day 2020, and later in 2022.
- Luke Thallon played the role for the Royal Shakespeare Company in 2025. The production, directed by Rupert Goold and designed by Es Devlin, was set on the Titanic.

Film

- Johnston Forbes-Robertson immortalized scenes from his performance in a highly truncated silent film made in 1913.
- Danish actress Asta Nielsen portrayed Hamlet in a loose 1921 adaptation which re-imagines Hamlet as a woman.
- Laurence Olivier directed himself as Hamlet in a 1948 film, winning an Academy Award for his performance.
- Richard Burton portrayed Hamlet in a 1964 filmed version of the stage play.
- Innokenty Smoktunovsky played Hamlet in a 1964 Russian film, directed by Grigori Kozintsev.
- Nicol Williamson portrayed Hamlet in Tony Richardson's 1969 version.
- Mel Gibson played Hamlet in Franco Zeffirelli's 1990 version.
- Iain Glen portrayed Hamlet in the 1990 film Rosencrantz & Guildenstern Are Dead, directed by Tom Stoppard and based on his play.
- Kenneth Branagh directed himself as Hamlet in a 1996 film version, which is the only full-length version of the play on film.
- Ethan Hawke played Hamlet in an adaptation released in 2000.
- Richard Pyros played Hamlet in The Tragedy of Hamlet, Prince of Denmark released in 2007 at the Melbourne International Film Festival.
- Shahid Kapoor played Haider (Hamlet) in a 2014 film adaptation by Vishal Bharadwaj.
- George MacKay played Hamlet in Ophelia (2018 film).
- Noah Jupe played Hamlet in Chloé Zhao's 2025 film Hamnet, a fictional account of the possible influences of Shakespeare's late son, Hamnet, in the character of Hamlet.

Television

- Maurice Evans was the first to play the role on American television, in 1953 on the Hallmark Hall of Fame.
- Maximilian Schell portrayed Hamlet in a version produced for German television in 1961. This version was poorly received and largely overlooked until it was featured on a 1999 episode of Mystery Science Theater 3000.
- Christopher Plummer received an Emmy Award nomination for a BBC television version filmed at Elsinore Castle in 1964.
- Richard Chamberlain played Hamlet in a Hallmark Hall of Fame presentation in 1970.
- Derek Jacobi played Hamlet in the 1980 BBC Television Shakespeare production.
- Kevin Kline played the role in a 1990 PBS television production which he also directed, and which originated at the New York Shakespeare Festival.
- Campbell Scott played the role in a U.S. 2000 television production set during the American Civil War, in which Polonius, Ophelia, and Laertes were portrayed as an African-American family.
- David Tennant and the rest of the original cast from the 2008–09 Royal Shakespeare Company production reprised their roles for a BBC film version, which aired in the UK in December 2009.
- Andrew Scott reprised his role from the Robert Icke-directed 2017 production for a BBC film version, which was filmed at the Harold Pinter Theatre and aired in 2018.

== Other versions ==
In the comic book series Kill Shakespeare, Hamlet is the central character. After he is exiled from Denmark, his ship is attacked and he washes up on England. He is encountered by Richard III of England, who tells him that he is the "Shadow King", a figure of prophecy. He tells Hamlet that he must find and kill the wizard William Shakespeare and retrieve his quill. He goes off, but is relentlessly pursued by assassins from Richard and his lieutenant, Iago. He is eventually captured by the fool known as Falstaff, who helps him get out of the woods after an encounter with a being known as a Prodigal. He is shot in the leg by Iago, but is saved by Juliet Capulet and Othello. Hamlet stops Othello from killing Iago, but is taken captive by Juliet and her resistance army. After going with them into a town and seeing the cruelty of Richard, Hamlet flees into the woods, where he is forced to face the ghost of his father. He defeats the ghost and is eventually picked up by two travellers: Lysander and Demetrius.

== Notes ==
=== Sources ===
- Braun, Edward (1982). The Director and the Stage: From Naturalism to Grotowski. London: Methuen. ISBN 978-0-413-46300-5.
- Rowell, George (1993). The Old Vic Theatre: A History. Cambridge: Cambridge University Press. ISBN 9780521346252.
