= Neema Bickersteth =

Canadian performing artist and soprano singer

- Born: St. Albert, Alberta, Canada
- Education: University of British Columbia
- Known for: soprano singer, performance artist
- Notable work: Century Song - performance artwork on 100 years of Black Women's lives
- Awards: Dora Mavor Moore Award
- Website: https://www.neemabee.ca/

Neema Bickersteth is a Canadian performing artist and soprano singer. She is best known for her interpretation in opera, physical theatre, and contemporary performance art in Canada, the United States, and Europe.

== Life and career ==
=== Early life and education ===
Bickersteth was born and raised in the city of St. Albert, Alberta, Canada, to parents of Sierra Leonean (Krio) heritage. She began formal voice training at age eight and later obtained both a Bachelor of Music and a Master of Music in Opera from the University of British Columbia.

=== Opera and concert performance ===
Based in Toronto, Bickersteth has performed a range of operatic roles, including Pamina in Mozart’s The Magic Flute, the title role in Lehár’s The Merry Widow, and the soprano lead in Dark Star Requiem at festivals such as Luminato and with Tapestry New Opera. In 2023, she starred as Treemonisha in a new production of Scott Joplin’s opera Treemonisha presented at Toronto’s Luminato Festival. She also participated in Aportia Chryptych: A Black Opera for Portia White with the Canadian Opera Company in June 2024.

Bickersteth has further performed in concert for personalities such as the Dalai Lama, Shirin Ebadi, and Archbishop Desmond Tutu. In 2022, she appeared in The Ritual of Breath Is the Rite to Resist at Dartmouth’s Hopkins Center, an interdisciplinary work reflecting on the death of Eric Garner.

=== Contemporary and interdisciplinary theatre ===
As a co‑founder and creative producer of the Moveable Beast collective, Bickersteth developed Century Song, a hybrid performance blending wordless soprano singing, dance, digital projection, and choreography. Century Song represents a 100 years of Black women's lives. Every one of the story's characters is brought to life through the work of one of the 20th century’s most experimental composers. The work premiered in 2015 and has toured across Canada, Europe, and East Africa. She also performed in Forbidden (Tapestry’s Tap:Ex series), which fused opera, hip‑hop, and Persian music.

Bickersteth has appeared with major Canadian arts organizations, including the Canadian Opera Company, Toronto’s Soulpepper Theatre, Nightwood Theatre, Stratford Festival, PuSh Festival, and the National Arts Centre. She has toured as a soloist with Spanish-Catalan musician Jordi Savall in a concert programme blending Creole music with music from Africa, America and the Caribbean.

=== Awards and recognition ===
- Winner and three‑time nominee for Outstanding Performance at the Dora Mavor Moore Awards in Toronto
- Named among the “Top Ten Theatre Artists in Toronto” by NOW magazine

== Reception ==
Bickersteth's performances have been noted for integrating classical vocal technique with physicality, movement, and storytelling. Critics have remarked her voice "echoing around the space with a clarity and confidence" and her "powerful presence with an earth-shatteringly dynamic voice" in works that challenge conventional genre boundaries. Her appearance in Century Song received favourable reviews from publications including The Guardian, The St. Albert Gazette, The New York Times, and the Financial Times.
