= Coming of Age (1993 film) =

1993 TV movie

- Genre: Drama
- Written by: Donald Martin; Betty Jane Wylie
- Directed by: E. Jane Thompson
- Starring: Marion Gilsenan; Jan Rubeš; Bernard Behrens; Jennifer Phipps
- Country of origin: Canada
- Original language: English

Production
- Producers: Ira Levy; Barri Cohen; Peter Williamson
- Cinematography: Milan Podsedly
- Running time: 90 minutes
- Production companies: CKVR-TV; Breakthrough Films

Original release
- Network: Viewers Choice
- Release: December 20, 1993

Coming of Age is a Canadian dramatic television film, which was released on the pay-per-view channel Viewers Choice in 1993. The film stars Marion Gilsenan as Jane McKenzie, a widow who takes a number of boarders into her home to make ends meet after the death of her husband.

The cast includes Jan Rubeš as Tomas Havel, a retired handyman who becomes a new love interest for Jane; Bernard Behrens and Jennifer Phipps as Arthur and Ruth Stone, a couple faced with Ruth's cognitive decline due to Alzheimer's disease; and Julie Stewart as Jane's daughter Heather; as well as Tom Barnett, Ardon Bess, Esther Hockin and Jacelyn Holmes in supporting roles.

The film was produced by Breakthrough Films in conjunction with CKVR-TV, and premiered on Viewers Choice in December 1993. After both Behrens and Phipps won Gemini Awards for their performances in early 1995, the film was rebroadcast in December 1995 by the stations of the CanWest Global System.

== Critical response ==
John Haslett Cuff of The Globe and Mail gave the film a moderately favourable review, calling it "a better-than-average TV film" that was "very well acted and sensitively directed". He concluded that "it's all so gently and earnestly done that it seems churlish to harp further on deficiencies which are so common to the genre. It is important that Canadian TV stations and independent producers continue to take the initiative in finding ways to produce indigenous dramatic projects. And if the quality is no worse than what is produced by the CBC and other networks, that's more a criticism of the big guys who have far greater resources, because they set the standards."

Jim Bawden of the Toronto Star called it "a welcome surprise...beautifully acted by a mostly elderly cast and very moving in depicting the sorrows and pain that come with aging."

== Awards ==
Award	Date of ceremony	Category	Nominees	Result	Reference
Gemini Awards	March 5, 1995	Best Television Movie	Ira Levy, Barri Cohen, Peter Williamson	Nominated	
Gemini Awards	March 5, 1995	Best Supporting Actor in a Drama Program or Series	Bernard Behrens	Won	
Gemini Awards	March 5, 1995	Best Supporting Actress in a Drama Program or Series	Jennifer Phipps	Won	
