= Astrid Janson =

Canadian set designer and costume designer

- Born: June 9, 1947 (age 79); Cappel, Germany
- Education: University of British Columbia, Waterloo Lutheran University
- Occupations: Set designer, costume designer
- Years active: 1972–present

Astrid Janson (born June 9, 1947) is a Canadian set designer and costume designer. Best known for her work in theatre, she has also designed for television, opera, dance, film and exhibitions.

She is the winner of several Dora Mavor Moore Awards, as well as the first Toronto Drama Bench Award for Distinguished Contribution to the Canadian Theatre (now The Herbert Whittaker/CTCA Award).

== Life and education ==
Astrid Dora Janson was born in Cappel, Germany on June 9, 1947. Part of a working-class family, she moved to Toronto as a child.

In high school and university, Janson took an interest in politics and then political theatre. "I was a kid of the Sixties and wanted to get in on all that revolting," she later told a reporter.

She earned a Bachelor of Arts in philosophy at Waterloo Lutheran University (1969) and a Master of Arts in theatre design at the University of British Columbia (1972).

After graduating, she moved to Toronto to find work opportunities.

In 2016, Wilfrid Laurier University presented Janson with an Honorary Doctor of Letters.

== Career ==
=== 1970 to 1990 ===
Janson started her career with the Toronto Dance Theatre as a costume designer for its 1972–1973 season. Soon after, she began work at Toronto Workshop Productions, working as the resident designer until 1977 and then freelance designer for five more years.

From 1975 to 1984, she worked at the Canadian Broadcasting Corporation as a costume designer and made her designer debut at Shaw Festival and Stratford Festival.

Throughout the 1970s, she contributed to small theatre companies like Theatre Compact, Global Village Theatre and Tarragon Theatre.

In the 1980s, Janson started designing for large venues such as Young People's Theatre, National Ballet of Canada, Royal Winnipeg Ballet, St. Lawrence Centre for the Arts, Toronto Free Theatre, Canadian Opera Company, Toronto Arts Productions and Desrosiers Dance Company. She also worked with newly-formed small companies like Nightwood Theatre and VideoCabaret.

=== 1990 to present ===
In the 1990s, Janson designed for companies including Canadian Stage Company, National Arts Centre, Factory Theatre, Tarragon Theatre, Citadel + Compagnie, and the Eclectic Theatre.

Janson created the design for the Discovery Gallery at Royal Ontario Museum in 1998—one of multiple exhibition projects in her career.

From 1993 to 2007, Janson taught as an assistant professor at University of Toronto's theatre department.

She belongs to the Associated Designers of Canada.

== Style ==
For set designs, projections on unusual surfaces are a trademark of Janson's work. In her words: "I think painting so often solidifies space... I want to get away from that. I love projections, but not on screens. They must be a surprise. I only like to use them on other surfaces."

== Awards ==
=== Dora Mavor Moore Awards ===
==== Outstanding Costume Design ====
- General Theatre — The Great War (2016)
- Independent Theatre — Trudeau and the FLQ (2014)
- Independent Theatre — The War of 1812: The History of the Village of the Small Huts, 1812-15 (2013)
- Independent Theatre — The Life and Times of Mackenzie King (2012)
- Independent Theatre — Laurier (2008)
- General Theatre — The Red River Rebellion (2005)
- General Theatre — Confederation (2004)
- Small Theatre — The Global Village Part II: Trudeau and the FLQ (1997)
- Small Theatre — The Cold War (1996)
- Small Theatre — The Great War (1993)
- Drama / Comedy — The Grace of Mary Traverse (1987)
- Revue / Musical — Jacob Two Two Meets the Hooded Fang (1984)
- Revue / Musical — Cabaret (1983)

==== Outstanding Set Design ====
- General Theatre — The Maids (2003)
- General Theatre — La Ronde (2002)
- Mid-Size Theatre — Assassins (1995)
- Revue / Musical — Cabaret (1983)

=== Other ===
- Gemini Award for production design — Shadow Pleasures (2004)
- Silver Ticket Award for Lifetime Achievement in the Theatre, awarded by Toronto Alliance for the Performing Arts (2001)
- Toronto Drama Bench Award for Distinguished Contribution to the Canadian Theatre (1980)
