= Marion Gilsenan =

Canadian actress (1936–1999)

Marion Gilsenan (1936 – January 11, 1999) was a Canadian actress, best known for her regular role as Joan McKenzie in the Canadian television soap opera Riverdale.

Born in England, Gilsenan moved to Canada in her early 20s, and began her career as a stage actress with the Canadian Stage Company and the Shaw Festival. She was a four-time Dora Mavor Moore Award nominee for her stage work, receiving nods for Outstanding Performance in a Featured Role in 1980 for Strawberry Fields, Outstanding Performance by a Female in a Play (Midsize Theatre) in 1995 for The Stillborn Lover, Outstanding Performance by a Female in a Musical (Large Theatre) in 1996 for A Little Night Music, and Outstanding Performance by a Female in a Play (Large Theatre) in 1997 for Thirteen Hands.

On television she starred in the 1993 film Coming of Age, but principally had supporting and guest roles until being cast as a regular in Riverdale. Of her character, Gilsenan said that "she's not totally nice -- she's very selfish, very snobbish, but she also has wonderful qualities. She wants the best for herself and her family. I think there's some self- knowledge, some warmth and sense of humour." Gilsenan was battling cancer for much of her stint on the series, but delayed chemotherapy because her early treatments made her too weak and tired and she did not want to give up her acting roles.

She died of cancer on January 11, 1999, after production on the second season of Riverdale had concluded but before production on the third season began. Her character was written out of the series rather than being recast.

She was a Gemini Award nominee for Best Supporting Actress in a Drama Program or Series at the 6th Gemini Awards in 1992 for the television film Getting Married in Buffalo Jump, and won the award for Riverdale at the 14th Gemini Awards in 1999, several months after her death.
