= Viola Léger =

Canadian actress and politician (1930–2023)

The Honourable Viola Léger OC ONB

Senator for L'Acadie, New Brunswick
- In office June 13, 2001 – June 29, 2005
- Appointed by: Jean Chrétien

Personal details
- Born: June 29, 1930 Fitchburg, Massachusetts, U.S.
- Died: January 28, 2023 (aged 92) Dieppe, New Brunswick, Canada
- Party: Liberal
- Education: Boston University

Viola Léger OC ONB (June 29, 1930 – January 28, 2023) was an American-born Canadian actress and politician who served in the Senate of Canada from 2001 to 2005.

Born in Fitchburg, Massachusetts, Léger received a B.A. and a B.Ed. from the Université de Moncton, and an M.F.A. (Theater Education) from Boston University. As an actress, she was most noted for playing the title role in Antonine Maillet's play La Sagouine for both stage and television, performing the role over 3,000 times over the course of her career from 1971 until 2016.

She was appointed to the Senate at the recommendation of Prime Minister Jean Chrétien, in 2001, representing the senatorial division of L'Acadie, New Brunswick. She was a member of the Liberal caucus. Léger retired from the Senate on June 29, 2005 at the mandatory retirement age of 75.

Léger died in Dieppe, New Brunswick on January 28, 2023, at the age of 92.

== Awards and honours ==
She was a Dora Mavor Moore Award winner for lead performance at the 1980 Dora Mavor Moore Awards for the production of La Sagouine at the Théâtre Français de Toronto.

In 1989, she was made an Officer of the Order of Canada. In 2007, she was awarded the Order of New Brunswick. Léger received a Governor General's Performing Arts Award in 2013 for her work as an actress.
