= Abena Malika =

Abena Malika is an actress, singer and DJ from Toronto. She performed in the United States premiere of Da Kink in My Hair by Trey Anthony at the San Diego Repertory Theatre (in 2005). In 2009, she was nominated for the "Dora Mavor Moore Award for Outstanding Performance by a Female in a Principal Role – Play" for her performance in A Raisin in the Sun. She also performed in episodes of the TV series Lost Girl (in 2010), Suits (in 2012), and Rookie Blue (in 2014).
