= Paper Wheat =

Paper Wheat is a play by the 25th Street Theatre Centre about the hard lives of early Saskatchewan settlers and the foundation of the wheat pools and the Co-op movement on the Canadian Prairies. The most successful stage show in Saskatchewan history, Paper Wheat opened in Sintaluta, Saskatchewan on May 18, 1977 and subsequently played to full houses across the province.

Paper Wheat was an example of documentary theatre, with company members traveling to local communities to collect stories about Saskatchewan history. A first version was collectively created and written by cast and crew, including director Andras Tahn and actor Linda Griffiths. The provincial and national tour, under the direction of Guy Sprung, with Sharon Bakker, David Francis, Skai Leja, Lubomir Mykytiuk, Michael Fahey and Bill Procopchuk, totally reworked the play, sharpened the politics and added new characters, new scenes and dialogue created by the same collective process.

== Film ==
A Prairie tour of the play was filmed by National Film Board of Canada filmmaker Albert Kish (in 1979), as one of the last films in its Challenge for Change series. There is also a CBC one hour version.
