= Seana McKenna =

Canadian actress (born 1956)

Seana McKenna CM (born 15 August 1956) is a Canadian actress primarily associated with stage roles at the Stratford Shakespeare Festival.

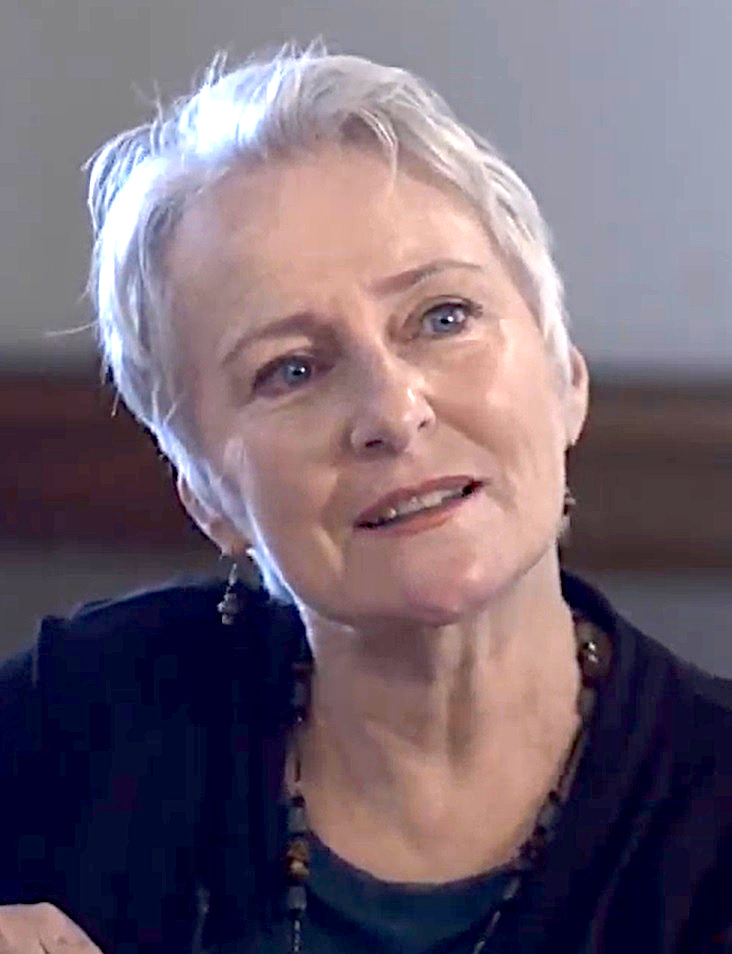
Seana McKenna in 2016

== Background ==
Seana McKenna was born in Toronto, Ontario, Canada. She is a graduate of the National Theatre School of Canada, where as a student she played Gwendolen in The Importance of Being Earnest and Isabella in Women Beware Women by Thomas Middleton.

== Stratford Shakespeare Festival ==
McKenna has played over 40 stage roles over the course of 36 years at the Stratford Shakespeare Festival, and major ones from very early on, specializing since the 2000s in strong-willed women but also mesmerizing as an actress looking very different from one role to another. 2013 was her 26th season: She played Queen Elizabeth I in Friedrich Schiller's Mary Stuart directed by Antoni Cimolino and Madame Arcati in Noël Coward's Blithe Spirit directed by Brian Bedford. She directed Twelfth Night for the 2024 season.

== Roles in other companies ==
She has also played leading roles in many other major houses across Canada, including the title role in Antony and Cleopatra by William Shakespeare (Centaur Theatre), Maggie in Cat on a Hot Tin Roof by Tennessee Williams (Grand Theatre, London), The Search for Signs of Intelligent Life in the Universe by Jane Wagner (Belfry Theatre, Neptune Theatre, National Arts Centre, Manitoba Theatre Centre/MTC), Blanche Dubois in A Streetcar Named Desire by Tennessee Williams (Theatre New Brunswick), Eliza Dollitle in Pygmalion and the title role in Candida by George Bernard Shaw (Shaw Festival), Medea by Euripides and Hedda Gabler by Henrik Ibsen (MTC), Blanche Dubois again at MTC, Wit by Margaret Edson at the Canadian Stage Company, Orpheus Descending by Tennessee Williams at the Manitoba Theatre Centre and Royal Alexandra Theatre, Doubt: A Parable by John Patrick Shanley at the Canadian Stage Company, Phèdre by Jean Racine (American Conservatory Theater), and The Year of Magical Thinking by Joan Didion (Belfry Theatre, Tarragon Theatre, and National Arts Centre).

== Films and TV ==
Mckenna has also acted in a few films and television, including the 1997 film The Hanging Garden, in which she won a Genie Award for Best Supporting Actress, as well at filmed Stratford productions: Twelfth Night (1986, King John (2015), and Hamlet (2016)

== Personal life ==
Mckenna has been with husband and fellow actor Miles Potter since 1980. Her son, Callan Potter, is also an actor and is known for playing Hayden Pike in the Canadian TV show Heated Rivalry.

== Stratford Shakespeare Festival credits ==
- A Midsummer Night's Dream (1982) by William Shakespeare — Helena
- All's Well That Ends Well (1982) by William Shakespeare — Diana
- Tartuffe (1983) by Molière — Mariane
- Macbeth (1983) by William Shakespeare — second Weird Sister
- As You Like It (1983) by William Shakespeare — Understudy for Roberta Maxwell's Rosalind, As cast
- Romeo and Juliet (1984) by William Shakespeare — Juliet
- The Merchant of Venice (1984) by William Shakespeare — Jessica
- Twelfth Night (1985) by William Shakespeare — Viola
- King Lear (1985) by William Shakespeare — Cordelia
- She Stoops to Conquer (1985) by Oliver Goldsmith — Kate Hardcastle
- Cat on a Hot Tin Roof (1989) by Tennessee Williams — Assistant director
- The Merchant of Venice (1989) by William Shakespeare — Portia
- Macbeth (1995) by William Shakespeare — Lady Macbeth
- The Country Wife (1995) by William Wycherley — Lady Fidget
- The Night of the Iguana (1998) by Tennessee Williams — Hannah Jelkes
- The School for Scandal (1999) by Richard Brinsley Sheridan — Lady Sneerwell
- A Midsummer Night's Dream (1999) by William Shakespeare — Titania
- Tartuffe (2000) by Molière — Dorine
- Medea (2000) by Euripides — Medea
- Private Lives (2001) by Noël Coward — Amanda Prynne
- "Henry V" (2001) by William Shakespeare — Chorus
- Good Mother (2001) by Damien Atkins — Anne Driver
- Richard III (2002) by William Shakespeare — Queen Elizabeth
- Henry VI: Revenge in France (2002) by William Shakespeare — Margaret
- Henry VI: Revolt in England (2002) by William Shakespeare — Margaret
- The Taming of the Shrew (2003) by William Shakespeare — Katherina
- Present Laughter (2003) by Noël Coward — Monica
- Henry VIII (play) (2004) by William Shakespeare — Queen Katherine
- Noises Off (2004) by Michael Frayn — Dotty Otley
- Fallen Angels (2005) by Noël Coward — Julia
- Orpheus Descending (2005) by Tennessee Williams — Lady Torrance
- Twelfth Night (2006) by William Shakespeare — Olivia
- The Glass Menagerie (2006) by Tennessee Williams — Amanda Wingfield
- London Assurance (2006) by Dion Boucicault — Lady Gay Spanker
- Shakespeare's Will (2007) by Vern Thiessen — Anne Hathaway
- The Trojan Women (2008) by Euripides — Andromache
- Fuente Ovejuna (2008) by Lope de Vega — Isabella, Queen of Spain
- Phèdre (2009) by Jean Racine — Phèdre
- The Winter's Tale (2010) by William Shakespeare — Paulina
- Dangerous Liaisons (2010) by Christopher Hampton — Marquise de Merteuil
- Richard III (2011) by William Shakespeare - Richard III
- Shakespeare's Will (2011) by Vern Thiessen — Anne Hathaway
- Electra (2012) by Sophocles — Clytemnestra
- The Matchmaker (2012) by Thornton Wilder — Dolly Levi
- Mary Stuart (2013) by Friedrich Schiller — Queen Elizabeth I
- Blithe Spirit (2013) by Noël Coward — Madame Arcati
- Mother Courage and Her Children (2014) by Bertolt Brecht — Mother Courage
- King John (2014) by William Shakespeare — Constance
- Hamlet (2015) by William Shakespeare — Gertrude
- The Physicists (2015) by Friedrich Dürrenmatt — Fräulein Mathilde von Zahnd
- Romeo and Juliet (2017) by William Shakespeare — The nurse
- The Madwoman of Chaillot (2017) by Jean Giraudoux —Aurélie
- Julius Caesar (2018) by William Shakespeare — Julius Caesar
- Richard III (2022) by William Shakespeare — Queen Margaret
- Les Belles-Soeurs (2023) by Michel Tremblay — Rose Ouimet
- "Sense and Sensibility" (2025) by Kate Hamill, based on the novel by Jane Austen —Mrs. Jennings, Mrs. Ferrars
- Saturday, Sunday, Monday (2026) by Eduardo de Filippo —Aunt Meme

== DVDs, CDs, Audiobooks, Video clips ==
- Twelfth Night (1986) CBC Home Video, Canadian Broadcasting Corporation, based on the 1985 Stratford Shakespeare Festival production.
- Good Mother (2002) by Damien Atkins Bell Canada Reading, CBC Audiobook CD, Canadian Broadcasting Corporation.
- Medea (2001) by Euripides CBC Audiobook CD, Canadian Broadcasting Corporation, based on the 2001 Stratford Shakespeare Festival production.
- Narrator for Away, novel in Audiobook format by Jane Urquhart.
- Interview for Theatre Museum Canada by R.H. Thomson https://www.youtube.com/watch?v=2qPUVOzJkrU
