= Erin Shields =

Canadian actor and playwright

- Occupations: Actor; playwright
- Writing career
- Period: 2000s-present
- Notable works: If We Were Birds; Paradise Lost
- Website: erinshields.ca

Erin Shields is a Canadian stage actor and playwright. She is best known for her play If We Were Birds, which won the Governor General's Award for English-language drama at the 2011 Governor General's Awards and was a nominee for the 2010 Dora Mavor Moore Award for Outstanding New Play. The play premiered at the Summerworks Festival in 2008 before being mounted by Tarragon Theatre in 2010.

Her other plays include Barrel Crank, Montparnasse (co-written with Maev Beaty), The Unfortunate Misadventures of Masha Galinski, The Epic of Gilgamesh (up to the part when Enkidu dies), Soliciting Temptation, and Beautiful Man.

Her play Paradise Lost, a theatrical adaptation of John Milton's Paradise Lost, was a finalist for the Governor General's Award for English-language drama at the 2018 Governor General's Awards.

In 2021, she wrote Here We Are, a 90-minute audio poem piece to mark the first anniversary of the COVID-19 lockdowns.

In 2026, her play To a Flame, a feminist reimagining of Edgar Allan Poe's To F——, premiered at Nightwood Theatre.
