= Strawberry Fields (play) =

Play by Stephen Poliakoff

Strawberry Fields is a theatre play written by Stephen Poliakoff and staged at the Cottesloe, National Theatre in March 1977. Strawberry Fields was the first ever National Theatre production at the Cottesloe, the NT’s ‘black box’ studio theatre (now Dorfman).

It starred Jane Asher, Stephen Rea and Kenneth Cranham and was directed by the film director Michael Apted.

The play was also presented at the Manhattan Theatre Club in New York in 1978.

== Overview ==
Strawberry Fields brings together a group of distinctive characters who have little in common other than the cause that they support and is set against the question of how seemingly harmless individual characters might, in given socio-historical circumstances, get drawn into extreme beliefs and, indeed, violent action.

Described by Robin Nelson as "journey play" that "has a claustrophobic cauldron atmosphere, adding tension to what at the outset appear to be innocuous events. It is a kind of inverse Easy Rider rather than a play in which the built environment entraps the characters." Nelson referred to the CBC Radio review which described the play, "it’s 'Alice in Wonderland' with guns and sexual nostalgia, sort of a fairy tale cross between Pinter and Easy Rider".

Strawberry Fields has had many productions since, especially across Europe. It was made into a television film version in West Germany, which was transmitted on Channel 4 in 1985.

The playtext was issued in 1977 by Methuen.
