= Dora Mavor Moore Awards =

Award for the performing arts in Toronto

- Awarded for: Best in Toronto theatre
- Country: Canada
- Presented by: Toronto Alliance for the Performing Arts
- First award: 1978–present
- Website: tapa.ca/doras

The Dora Mavor Moore Awards (also known as the Dora Awards or the Doras) are awards presented annually by the Toronto Alliance for the Performing Arts (TAPA), honouring theatre, dance and opera productions in Toronto. Named after Dora Mavor Moore, who helped establish Canadian professional theatre, the awards program was established on December 13, 1978, with the first awards held in 1980. Each winner receives a bronze statue made from the original by John Romano.

== Awards ==
Awards are given in major divisions: General Theatre (Drama/Comedy/Play, budget over $100,000 and over 150 seats), Musical Theatre (Musical/Revue/Cabaret), Independent Theatre (budget under $100,000 and/or under 150 seats), Dance, Opera, Theatre for Young Audiences, and Touring. Each of these major categories is further sub-divided in an assorted number of awards. In 2018, the awards announced that beginning with the 2019 awards, it would discontinue gender-based performance categories, replacing its previous performance categories for men and women with "Outstanding Performance" categories.

=== General Theatre ===
- Production
- Original Play
- Leading Performer
- Supporting Performer
- Direction
- Scenic/Projection Design
- Costume Design
- Lighting Design
- Sound Design/Composition
- Leading Actor (retired)
- Leading Actress (retired)
- Supporting Actor (retired)
- Supporting Actress (retired)
- Ensemble (retired)
- Choreography (retired)

=== Musical Theatre ===
- Production
- Original Musical
- Leading Performer
- Supporting Performer
- Direction
- Musical Direction
- Choreography
- Design
- Leading Actor (retired)
- Leading Actress (retired)
- Supporting Actor (retired)
- Supporting Actress (retired)
- Ensemble (retired)
- Scenic Design (retired)
- Costume Design (retired)
- Lighting Design (retired)
- Original Score (retired)

=== Independent theatre ===
- Production
- Original Play
- Direction
- Performer
- Ensemble
- Scenic/Projection Design
- Costume Design
- Lighting Design
- Sound Design/Composition
- Leading Actor (retired)
- Leading Actress (retired)
- Supporting Performer/Ensemble (retired)

=== Dance ===
- Production
- Performer
- Ensemble
- Choreography
- Design
- Sound Design/Composition
- Actor (retired)
- Actress (retired)

=== Opera ===
- Production
- Original Opera
- Performer
- Ensemble
- Direction
- Musical Direction
- Design
- Actor (retired)
- Actress (retired)

=== Theatre for Young Audiences ===
- Production
- Original Play
- Performer
- Ensemble
- Direction
- Design

=== Touring ===
- Production

== Ancillary awards ==
In association with the Dora Awards, several ancillary awards are also administered and presented by TAPA.

Although the Doras were cancelled in 2021 due to the COVID-19 pandemic in Canada shutting down theatre production in the 2020-21 season, ancillary awards were still presented that year as they are presented for the recipient's overall body of work rather than for specific shows within an eligibility period.

=== Pauline McGibbon Award ===
This award was established in 1981 in honour of former Lieutenant Governor of Ontario Pauline McGibbon. The winner is announced at the Dora Mavor Moore Award ceremony. This award is "Intended to assist a member of Ontario’s theatre community who has displayed a unique talent, a potential for excellence and who is in the early stages of his or her career." The Award recipient moves in a three-year cycle, rotating through individuals working as a director, a production craft person and a designer respectively. Each award winner receives $7,000 and a medal designed by Dora de Pedry Hunt.

=== Barbara Hamilton Award ===
Established in 1996 in recognition of Barbara Hamilton, this $1,000 prize, administered by the City of Toronto, is awarded to an individual who has "demonstrated excellence and professionalism in the performing arts." The winner of this award is announced during the press conference presenting the season's Dora Award nominees. Along with the cash prize, recipients also receive a scroll from the city of Toronto. Past winners include John Neville, Karen Kain, and Colin Mochrie

=== George Luscombe Award ===
Named for George Luscombe, founder and artistic director for 27 years of the Toronto Workshop Productions, this award is presented to an individual who has shown great mentorship in the realm of theatre. This award was first presented in 1999, and the recipient receives a framed print by artist Theo Dimson. The winner of this award is announced during the press conference announcing the Dora Award nominees.

=== Audience Choice Award ===
The Audience Choice Award was inaugurated in 2006 at the 27th Annual Dora Mavor Moore Awards. Presented by the Toronto Alliance for the Performing Arts (TAPA), the Audience Choice Award for Outstanding Production is sponsored by Now Magazine Toronto and Yonge-Dundas Square. Facilitated and sponsored by Now Magazine, the public was invited to vote online for a winner from the list of nominees in the General Theatre (Play and Musical), Independent Theatre, Opera and Theatre for Young Audiences Divisions; and Outstanding New Choreography in the Dance Division, or choose their show. The winner is announced at the Dora Awards ceremony and presented with a commemorative plaque.

=== Silver Ticket Award ===
Beginning in 1980, TAPA began presenting the silver ticket award to "an individual who has made an outstanding contribution to the Toronto stage and the development of Canadian Theatre". Nominees for the award are submitted from individuals from the general performing arts community, and a committee composed of previous Silver Ticket winners. Along with the award, the winning individual is entitled to two free tickets, for life, to any production performed by a company belonging to the Toronto Alliance for the Performing Arts.

=== Awards and nominations for Outstanding Touring Production ===
The Dora Mavor Moore 'Award for Outstanding Touring Production' was an annual award celebrating achievements in live Canadian theatre.

== Past winners ==
Past winners have included HAUI Salome Bey, Kawa Ada, John Alcorn, BirdLand Theatre, Michel Marc Bouchard, Valerie Buhagiar, Ronnie Burkett, Caroline Cave, Waawaate Fobister, Paul-André Fortier, David Hersey, Tomson Highway, Christopher House, Stuart Hughes, John Krizanc, Daniel MacIvor, Manitoba Theatre for Young People, Diego Matamoros, Neil Munro, Julian Richings, Roseneath Theatre, Tyley Ross, Djanet Sears, Denis Simpson, Michel Tremblay and Jonathan Wilson.

In 2005, arts patron and philanthropist Bluma Appel received an Honorary Dora Award.

== See also ==
- Floyd S. Chalmers Canadian Play Award
- Jessie Richardson Theatre Award
- Elizabeth Sterling Haynes Award
