= Culture of Montreal =

Montreal was referred to as "Canada's Cultural Capital" by Monocle Magazine. The city is Canada's centre for French-language television productions, radio, theatre, film, multimedia, and print publishing. The Quartier Latin is a neighbourhood crowded with cafés animated by this literary and musical activity. Montreal's many cultural communities have given it a distinct local culture.

As a North American city, Montreal shares many of the cultural features characteristic of the other metropolis on the continent, including representations in all traditional manifestations of high culture, a long-lasting tradition of jazz and rock music, and tentative experimentation in visual arts, theatre, music, and dance. Yet, being at the confluence of the French and the English traditions, Montreal has developed a unique and distinguished cultural face in the world. Another distinctive characteristic of Montreal culture life is to be found in the animation of its downtown, particularly during summer, prompted by cultural and social events, or festivals.

== Arts ==
=== Place des Arts ===
A cultural heart of classical art and the venue for many summer festivals, the Place des Arts is a complex of different concert and theatre halls surrounding a large open-spaced square in the downtown. Culture lovers will find six concert and theatre halls, five of them inside: Salle Wilfrid-Pelletier, Théâtre Maisonneuve, Théâtre Jean-Duceppe, Cinquième Salle, Studio-Théâtre and one outside site: l'Esplanade. Classical dances, operas, plays, and music performances from troops around the world and from Montreal's very own are scheduled in these halls on a daily basis. The Musée d'art contemporain is located across the Esplanade from Place des Arts, and some of the most important theatre troupes and musical concert scenes are found nearby in what is now called the Quartier des Spectacles.

==== Dance and performing arts ====
Performing at Place des Arts is the city's chief ballet company Les Grands Ballets Canadiens. In contemporary dance, Montreal has been a leader, particularly since the 1980s. Internationally recognized avant-garde dance troupes such as La La La Human Steps, O Vertigo, and the Fondation Jean-Pierre Perreault have toured the world and worked with international popular artists during videos and concerts. The intelligent and seamless integration of multi-disciplinary arts into the choreography of these troupes helped pave the way for the popularity of the Cirque du Soleil, a multimillion-dollar empire based on a mixture of modern circus and performing acts. The Agora de la danse is a studio where contemporary dancers most often perform.

==== Classical music ====
The Place des Arts also harbor the headquarters of the Montreal Symphony Orchestra (MSO) that performs in its halls regularly. The MSO is one of the top performance troupes in North America, most remembered for the quality performance of the repertoire of Maurice Ravel. Since 2006, the MSO has a new conductor, the American Kent Nagano. Two other popular Montreal orchestras that perform regularly at Places des Arts are the Orchestre Métropolitain conducted by Yannick Nézet-Séguin and I Musici de Montréal, a chamber orchestra founded by Yuli Turovsky and since 2011 conducted by Jean-Marie Zeitouni. I Musici de Montréal are considered among the greatest interpreters of the works of George Frideric Handel. Place des Arts are also the home of the Opéra de Montréal, the most prestigious opera company in Montreal. One Montreal radio station is entirely devoted to classical music.

=== Music ===
Given that Montreal is mostly French-speaking, most popular local bands and singers have sung in French. In the past, the most popular local artists succeeded in filling arenas (Beau Dommage, Offenbach, Cowboys Fringants) or even the Olympic Stadium (e.g., Diane Dufresne), a feat usually reserved to a few international rock stars. Special events, such as the musical show on the Quebec national holiday, regularly attract over one hundred thousand people. The height for the French musical scene is reached every year during the Francofolies. The festival attracts international artists from La Francophonie, popular artists from the Quebec musical scene, and emerging artists noticed during preceding festivals.

Montreal's English-speaking music scene also succeeds in getting attention from popular media around the world. The growing success of the current variety of artists and bands, with Arcade Fire arguably leading the way, owes much to the city's culture of melting together different genres of music present from many different cultures. A variety of music festivals and independent local record labels also help sustain this success. Other Montreal bands include Wolf Parade, Mobile, the Unicorns, and Simple Plan.

The Montreal International Jazz Festival illustrates well this melting of genres. Far from limiting itself to classical jazz (a style that Montreal always represented with jazzmen such as Oscar Peterson and Oliver Jones), it features a great variety of artists who have espoused rhythms and styles from around the world. Smaller musical festivals include the Festival International Nuits Afrique ("African Nights"), Montreal Reggae Festival, Pop Montreal, FestiBlues international de Montréal, Mutek electronic music festival, and the Osheaga Music and Arts Festival.

Every Sunday in Parc Mont-Royal near-downtown Montreal, there is a huge impromptu drumming festival in which hundreds of drummers are invited to jam. Tam Tams.

=== Theatre ===
Theatre in Montreal is dominated by French-language productions, in part because Montreal has traditionally been a centre for most successful Quebec plays. As a result, the most celebrated and internationally recognized Quebec playwrights have all worked in Montreal at some point, including Michel Tremblay (Les Belles Soeurs, Hosanna), who revolutionized Quebec theatre by writing in the local dialect, joual, and Montreal-adoptee Wajdi Mouawad (Wedding Day at the Cromagnons, Scorched). Most established French-language theatres are found in the Quartier Latin (e.g. Théâtre du Rideau Vert) or near Place des Arts (Théâtre du Nouveau Monde, Théâtre Jean-Duceppe). The city also hosts the Festival TransAmériques, a two-week showcase of international experimental theatre.

In contrast, English theatre struggled but survived with the Centaur Theatre. In 1979, David Fennario achieved notable success and notoriety with Canada's first bilingual play, Balconville, which documents rivalries between the English and French working class in the suburb of Pointe-St-Charles. Ethnic theatre, by the 70s, began to be a force, notably with the Black Theatre Workshop under the leadership of artistic director Tyrone Benskin, the Yiddish Theatre established at the Saidye Bronfman Centre, and later with the Teesri Duniya and Dummies Theatre. The 80s saw the feminist company Imago Theatre be formed. In the late 1990s, Montreal started to become a hotspot for low-budget independent English theatre with companies such as Optative Theatrical Laboratories, Infinithéâtre, MainLine Theatre, Gravy Bath Theatre, Sa Booge, Persephone, Pumpkin Productions, and Tableau D'Hôte Theatre adding to the scene. More recently, the theatre has been taking a more activist turn with emerging organizations such as ATSA and the Optative Theatrical Laboratories, and festivals such as the Anarchist Theatre Festival, MAYWORKS, and the Infringement Festival.

=== Literature ===
Montréal has a rich yet still relatively young literary history in both French and English literature. A large number of novels have captured the realities of Montreal. While any list will understandably be subjective, a few works are agreed to be important in Canadian and Québécois literature. Written in 1947, Gabrielle Roy's The Tin Flute (in French Bonheur d'occasion), which chronicles the life of a young woman in the neighborhood of St-Henri, marked Québécois literature for its urban texture. The work of Mordecai Richler, highlighted by The Apprenticeship of Duddy Kravitz (1959), depicts the lives of poor English-speaking residents of Mile End. Mostly Michel Tremblay perhaps best summarizes the alienation of poor working-class Montréalais at the onset of the Quebec Quiet revolution. The all-time best-selling novel in Québécois literature, Yves Beauchemin's The Alley Cat (Le Matou), depicts a relatively similar neighborhood twenty years later. The later work of Émile Ollivier, for example, La Brûlerie, is a portrait of French-speaking immigrants establishing their lives in the Côte-des-Neiges neighborhood. The nineteenth-century poet Émile Nelligan, whom American critic Edmund Wilson famously called "the only first-rate Canadian poet, French or English," has many schools and libraries named in his honour in Montreal and around Quebec. Montreal was also the centre of literary modernism in English Canada, led by the Montreal Group of poets including A.M. Klein and F. R. Scott in the mid-1920s. Montreal hosts a number of events related to literature, including the multilingual Blue Metropolis Montreal International Literary Festival, which takes place every Spring, and the Expozine alternative press fair every fall. Cult MTL is a local print publication and website in Montreal focusing on culture, music, film, arts, and city life.

=== Film ===
There are plenty of English-language screens in the city, mostly downtown. The largest and most modern are the central Paramount Montreal and the AMC Forum, both located on Ste-Catherine Street. In addition to presenting movies from the majors, the AMC Forum also presents independent movies of repertory cinema. Other cinemas concentrating on repertory movies include the Cinéma du Parc.

Cineastes have, on occasion, chosen Montreal for their movies. See Montreal in films.

== Museums ==
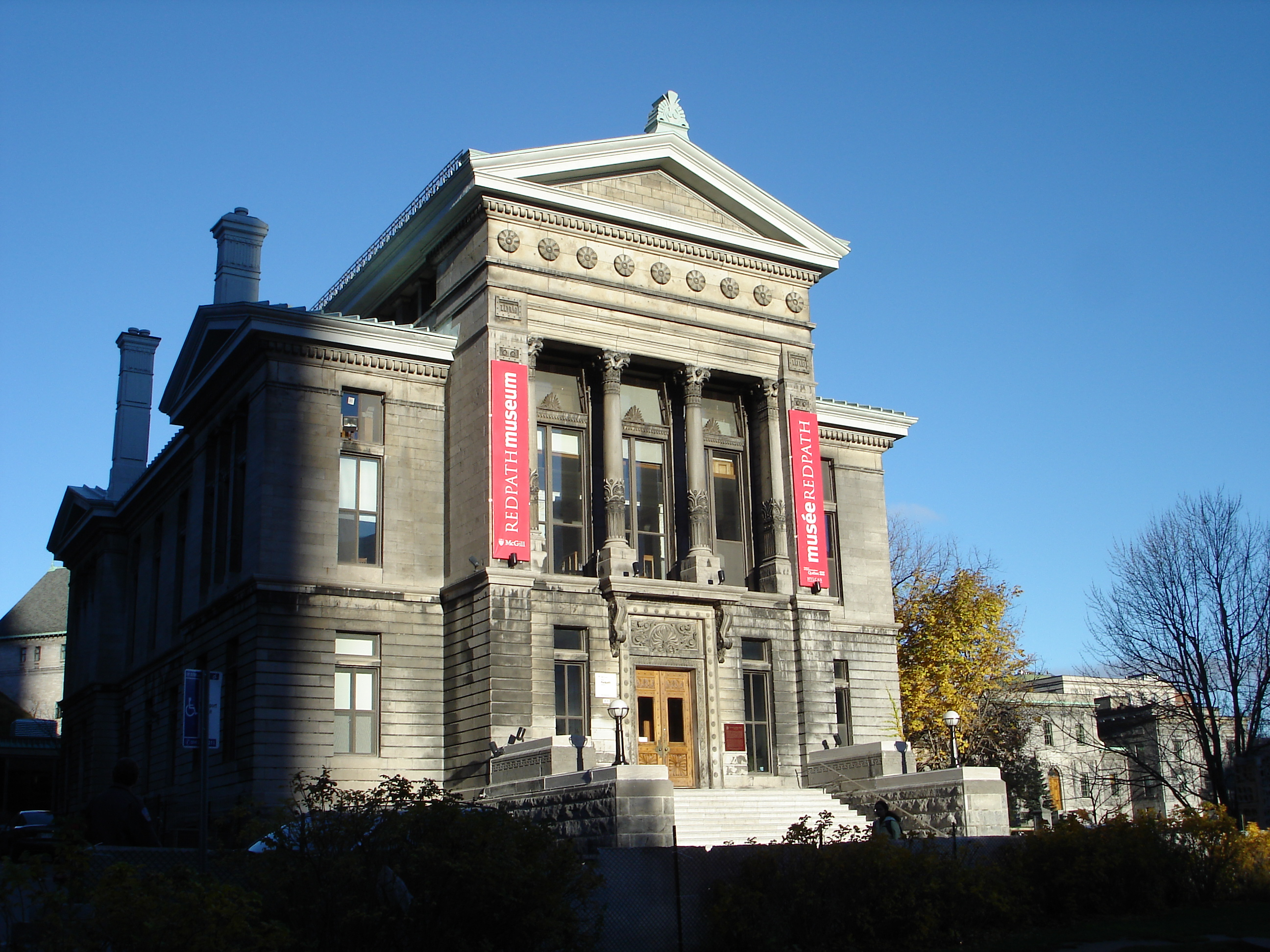
Redpath Museum

Montreal has a vast network of museums, art galleries, and exhibition centres. The Montreal Museum of Fine Arts possesses a varied collection of European, First Nations, Inuit, and Canadian arts, including important paintings from Montreal's own Betty Goodwin, James Wilson Morrice, and Paul-Émile Borduas. The Musée d'art contemporain has concentrated its collection mainly on emerging post-war Quebec artists, with arguably some of the best artistic works in Quebec from Alfred Pellan and Jean-Paul Riopelle.

Other praised museums are the Redpath Museum, the Stewart Museum, the McCord Museum of Canadian History, the Canadian Centre for Architecture, and the Montreal Museum of Archeology and History.

The region is also home to a number of science-related museums. Many of them are located in the Olympic Park complex, including the Montreal Biodome (which reproduces four ecosystems of The Americas), the Montreal Insectarium, the Montreal Botanical Garden, and the Planetarium. On the West Island, the Ecomuseum draws many visitors, and features an outdoor setting complete with animals native to the area. A recent addition to Montreal's museum scene is the Montreal Science Centre located in the Old Port, and featuring many hands-on experiments in various fields of science. The Laval Cosmodome houses both Space Camp Canada and the Space Science Centre. The Musée des ondes Emile Berliner in the South-West borough is dedicated to Canada's music industry and the inventor of the gramophone, Emile Berliner. A short drive south in Granby, is the Granby Zoo, notable for its wide variety of animals and amusements.

== Linguistic groups ==
=== Francophone ===
Montreal is the cultural centre of Québec, French-speaking Canada, and French-speaking North America as a whole, and an important city in the Francophonie. It is the largest French-speaking city in North America, and the cultural capital of the Quebec province. The city is a hub for French-language television productions, radio, theatre, circuses, performing arts, film, multimedia, and print publishing. The best talents from French Canada and even the French-speaking areas of the United States converge in Montreal and often perceive the city as their cultural capital. Montreal is also the most important stop in the Americas for Francophone artists from Europe, Africa, and Asia.

Some 30 years after the adoption of the Charter of the French Language, a greater number of first- or second-generation immigrants have established themselves in Montreal, such as playwright Wajdi Mouawad (Lebanese origin), singer Nicolas Ciccone (Italian origin), and author Dany Laferrière (Haitian origin), whom all contribute to Quebec's culture.

=== Anglophone ===
Montreal is also the cultural capital for English Quebec. The Montreal Gazette newspaper, McGill University, and the Centaur Theatre are traditional hubs of Anglo culture. The cultural divide between Montreal's and Canada's Francophone and Anglophone culture was strong and was famously referred to as the Two Solitudes by Canadian writer Hugh MacLennan. Reflecting their deep-seated colonial roots, the Solitudes were historically strongly entrenched in Montreal, splitting the city geographically at Saint Laurent Boulevard. This split, however, has become less and less apparent in the past decades. Although Anglophones still concentrate in the Montreal boroughs on the west side of the island, they have become more bilingual, as 66% of Quebec Anglophones claim to be able to carry on a conversation in French. Thus, while tensions can occur between Anglophones and Francophones, contemporary Montreal is home to a diverse collection of cultures and people who generally live together amicably.

=== Cultural contribution from other communities ===
Other cultural communities, be it first-generation immigrants or long-time settlers in Montreal, have greatly contributed to the originality and flavor of Montreal. Many festivals and parades are organized to celebrate the contribution of these communities, such as the Irish Saint Patrick Parade, the Greek Independence Day Parade, or the Festival des Nuits d'Afrique. Montreal's Jewish community has been a leading contributor to Montreal's cultural landscape and is renowned for its level of charitable giving and its plethora of cultural and social service community institutions. Among these are the world-renowned Jewish Public Library of Montreal, Segal Centre for the Arts, Museum of Jewish Montreal, and Montreal Holocaust Memorial Centre.

== Religion ==
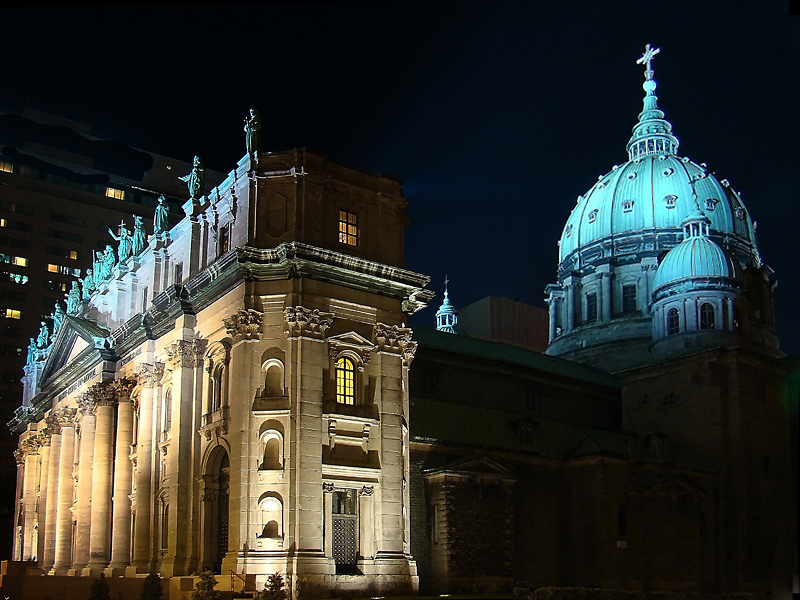
Mary, Queen of the World Cathedral

Nicknamed la ville aux cent clochers ("the city of a hundred belltowers"), Montreal is renowned for its churches. Indeed, as Mark Twain once noted, "This is the first time I was ever in a city where you couldn't throw a brick without breaking a church window." The city has four Roman Catholic basilicas: Mary, Queen of the World Cathedral, the aforementioned Notre-Dame Basilica, St. Patrick's Basilica, and Saint Joseph's Oratory. The Oratory is the largest church in Canada, with the largest dome of its kind in the world after that of Saint Peter's Basilica in Rome.

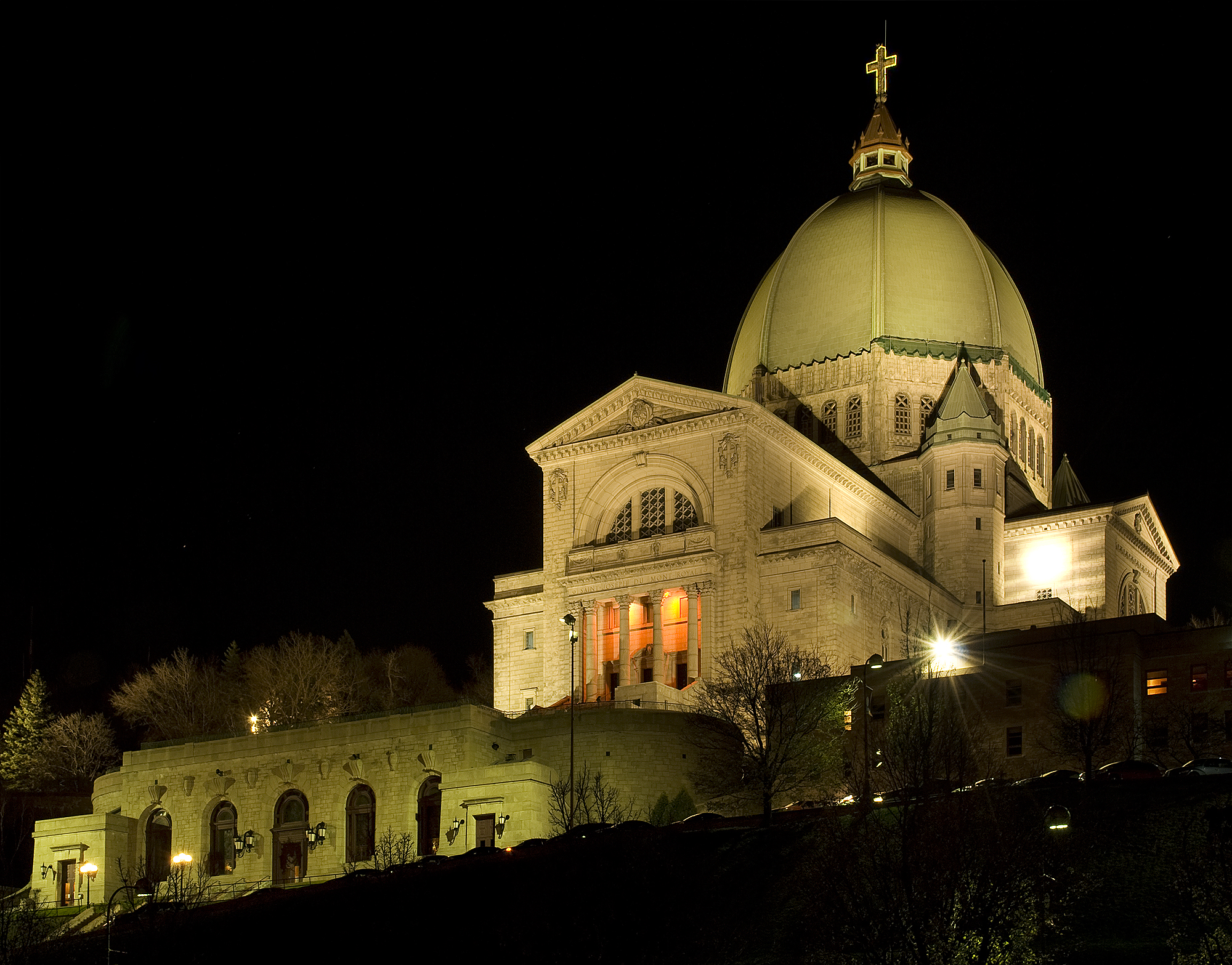
Saint Joseph's Oratory is the largest church in Canada.

Other well-known churches include Notre-Dame-de-Bon-Secours Chapel, which is sometimes called the Sailors' Church, and the Anglican Christ Church Cathedral, which was completely excavated and suspended above an excavated pit during the construction of part of the Underground City. All of the above are major tourist destinations, particularly Notre-Dame and the Oratory.

The dominant religion in Quebec is Christianity, which is adhered to by roughly 90.2% of the population.

Montreal is the seat of a diocese of the Armenian Apostolic Church.

== Cuisine ==
Of note is the regional variation, the Montreal hot dog. But Montreal's culinary landscape is perhaps most influenced by the diverse fabric of its ethnic communities. Italian, Greek, Jewish, and Lebanese communities have contributed to the mix of Montreal's restaurants. Jewish contributions include two world-renowned items, Montreal smoked meat sandwiches, and Montreal-style bagels. Lebanese falafels and shish taouk sandwiches, and Japanese sushi, have become much-appreciated cuisines.

This wide variety of cuisines underlines the fact that Montreal is one of the cities in the world with the highest number of restaurants. Montreal and its culinary landscape was the focus of Gourmet magazine's March 2006 issue. Montreal's unique cuisine has also given birth to a number of Montreal-centric restaurants and restaurant chains, such as Dagwoods, Dic Ann's Hamburgers, Dunn's Famous, Moishes Steakhouse, Schwartz's, and Lafleur Restaurants.

== Tourism ==
Tourism is an important industry in Montreal. The city welcomed 14 million visitors in 2005. Like the province of Quebec, visitors to Montreal come from around the world, most of them from the United States, France, the United Kingdom, Germany, Mexico, and Japan. 39,000 jobs in Montreal were generated by the tourism industry in 2005.

Crescent Street in Downtown Montreal is popular among tourists. Throughout the summer, it features various street fairs and festivals. Among locals, Crescent Street is known better for its many clubs and bars. Saint-Laurent Boulevard and the surrounding Plateau Mont-Royal neighbourhood are also well known for their restaurants, bars, nightlife, and nightclubs.

=== Festivals ===
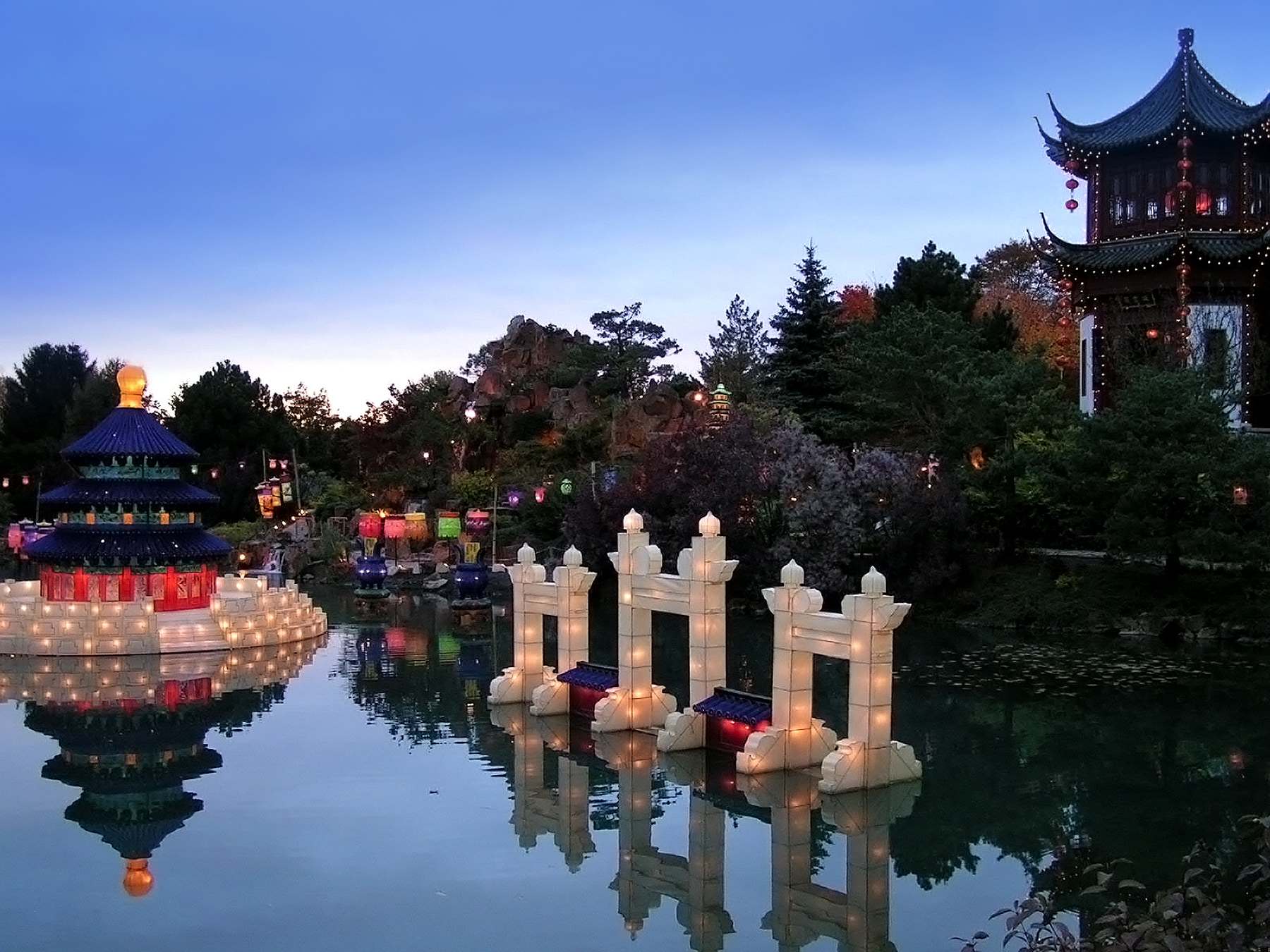
Lantern Festival at the Botanical Garden

The plaza on Place des Arts is the home of the most important events during several musical festivals, including the Montreal International Jazz Festival and Montreal Francofolies, a festival of French-language music. two festivals last seven-to-ten days. Performances are presented in different places, from relatively small clubs to the large halls of Place des Arts. Some of the outdoor shows are held on cordoned-off streets, while others are in terraced parks.

The city's most popular festival, in terms of attendance, is the Just For Laughs Festival, held annually in July, which is also the world's largest comedy festival. The Montreal Fireworks Festival also attracts a lot of attention. On the evenings of competition, tens of thousands of people watch the fireworks for free on their roofs or from locations nearby the competition. Other festivals in Montreal include Pop Montreal, The Fringe Festival, la Fête des Neiges de Montréal, and Nujaz. Annual family-oriented events promoting health and cycling are also organized in the streets of Montreal. Parades are also popular in downtown Montreal.

Montreal is also famous as the birthplace of the Infringement Festival, a reaction to the perceived corporatization of the Montreal Fringe Festival. The Infringement has since spread to many other cities in North America and Europe.

=== Night life ===
During the period of Prohibition in the United States, Montreal became well known as one of North America's "sin cities" with unparalleled nightlife, a reputation it still holds today. In part, its bustling nightlife is attributed to its relatively late "last call" (3 a.m.), a large university population, the drinking age of 18, and the excellent public transportation system combines with other aspects of the Montreal culture to make the city's nightlife unique. The diversity of the clubs in Montreal attests to the popularity of its nightlife, with night clubs, pubs, bars and singing bars ("boîte à chansons"), Latin clubs, African clubs, jazz clubs, lounges, after-hours houses, and strip clubs all attracting different types of customers.

The most active parts of Montreal's nightlife are the Downtown and the Quartier Latin. Saint-Denis street, which goes across the Quartier Latin, attracts a majority of the French-speaking population. Saint-Laurent Street (known locally as "the Main") is also one of the most popular streets. A majority of English-speaking Montrealers frequent the western part of the Downtown, with Crescent Street being one of the most popular streets in this sector. These three streets are all crossed by Downtown's most commercial street, Sainte-Catherine Street, which extends to its East in the heart of Montreal gay nightlife.

== See also ==
- Architecture of Montreal
- List of Montreal music venues
- Montreal International Games Summit
