= October Sky (disambiguation) =

October Sky is a 1999 American biographical film directed by Joe Johnston based on the memoir by Homer Hickam, Jr.

October Sky may also refer to

- October Sky (band)
- An alternative title for Rocket Boys, the 1998 memoir by Homer Hickam

== Music ==
- October Sky EP, 2006 recording by October Sky
- October Sky, 1999 soundtrack album by Mark Isham
- October Sky, 2012 album by Stanfour
- "October Sky", 2021 single by Yebba
