= List of Montreal music groups =

Montreal has been called the new hotbed for music worldwide by Rolling Stone magazine. The magazine also listed a song by the new indie rock group The Stills, "Still in Love", as one of the top songs of 2003. Originating in Montreal, the band Arcade Fire sold half a million copies of Funeral and were awarded a Grammy nomination for best alternative album.

== A ==
- A-Trak
- Adam and the Amethysts
- Adventure Club
- The Agonist
- AIDS Wolf
- Alaclair Ensemble
- All Hands Make Light
- All Systems Go!
- April Wine
- Arcade Fire
- Asexuals
- Audio Playground

== B ==
- The Barr Brothers
- Backxwash
- Beast
- Beau Dommage
- Bell Orchestre
- The Bells
- The Besnard Lakes
- Beyond Creation
- Bibi Club
- Bleu Jeans Bleu
- Blinker the Star
- Bootsauce
- The Box
- Bran Van 3000
- Les Breastfeeders
- Busty and the Bass

== C ==
- Chromeo
- Clues
- Cœur de Pirate
- Code Pie
- Les Colocs
- Les Cowboys Fringants
- Cryptopsy

== D ==
- Dead Obies
- Dead Messenger
- The Dears
- Deja Voodoo
- Desire
- Despised Icon
- Destroyalldreamers
- Doughboys
- Dubmatique
- Duchess Says
- The Dudes

== E ==
- Elephant Stone
- Esmerine

== F ==
- First You Get the Sugar
- Fleece
- Fly Pan Am
- Folly and the Hunter
- Fontarabie
- The Franklin Electric

== G ==
- Les Georges Leningrad
- Godspeed You! Black Emperor
- Grim Skunk
- Grimes
- The Gruesomes

== H ==
- Half Moon Run
- Handsome Furs
- Harmonium
- Hashimoto
- Hellenica
- Hexes and Ohs
- The High Dials
- Homeshake
- Hot Springs

== I ==
- Ion Dissonance
- Islands

== J ==
- Jerry Jerry and the Sons of Rhythm Orchestra
- Jean Leloup

== K ==
- Karkwa
- Kataklysm
- Kaytranada
- The King Khan & BBQ Show

== L ==
- Lae
- Land of Talk
- Lesbians on Ecstasy
- Lime
- Local Rabbits
- The Lovely Feathers
- Lunice
- The Luyas

== M ==
- Mahogany Rush
- Majical Cloudz
- Malajube
- Me Mom and Morgentaler
- Men I Trust
- Men Without Hats
- Milk & Bone
- Miracle Fortress
- Misteur Valaire
- Mobile
- El Motor

== N ==
- Navet Confit
- The New Cities
- The Nils
- No Joy
- NOBRO
- Nomadic Massive
- Le Nouvel Ensemble Moderne
- Numéro#

== O ==
- October Sky
- Offenbach
- OK Cobra
- Ol' Savannah
- Ought

== P ==
- Parlovr
- Planet Giza
- The Planet Smashers
- Plants and Animals
- Pony Up!
- Priestess

== Q ==
- Quo Vadis

== R ==
- Rational Youth
- Rhythm Activism
- Ripcordz

== S ==
- The Sainte Catherines
- The Sam Roberts Band
- Set Fire to Flames
- Shades of Culture
- Simple Plan
- Slaves on Dope
- Les Sœurs Boulay
- Stars
- The Stills
- Strange Froots
- Les Stups
- Sunset Rubdown
- Suuns

== T ==
- Tchukon
- TEKE::TEKE
- The Damn Truth
- Thee Silver Mt. Zion Memorial Orchestra & Tra-La-La Band
- Then One Day
- Think About Life
- Three O'Clock Train
- TOPS
- Torngat
- Trans-X
- Tricky Woo

== V ==
- Vilain Pingouin
- Vision Eternel
- Voivod

== W ==
- We Are Wolves
- Wolf Parade

== Y ==
- Yamantaka // Sonic Titan
- Yoo Doo Right
- Young Galaxy

== See also ==
- Music of Quebec
- Music of Canada
