= A Report to an Academy =

1917 short story by Franz Kafka

"A Report to an Academy" (German: "Ein Bericht für eine Akademie") is a short story by Franz Kafka, written and published in 1917. In the story, an ape named Red Peter, who has learned to behave like a human, presents to an academy the story of how he effected his transformation. The story was first published by Martin Buber in the German monthly Der Jude, along with another of Kafka's stories, "Jackals and Arabs" ("Schakale und Araber"). The story appeared again in a 1919 collection titled Ein Landarzt (A Country Doctor).

== Plot ==
The narrator, speaking before a scientific conference, describes his former life as an ape. His story begins in a West African jungle, in which a hunting expedition shoots and captures him. Caged on a ship for his voyage to Europe, he finds himself for the first time without the freedom to move as he will. Needing to escape from this situation, he studies the habits of the crew, and imitates them with surprising ease; he reports encountering particular difficulty only in learning to drink alcohol. Throughout the story, the narrator reiterates that he learned his human behavior not out of any desire to be human, but only to provide himself with a means of escape from his cage.

Upon arriving in Europe, the ape realizes that he is faced with a choice between the "Zoological Garden" or the "Music Hall", and devotes himself to becoming human enough to become an able performer. He accomplishes this, with the help of many teachers, and reports to the academy that his transformation is so complete that he can no longer properly describe his emotions and experiences as an ape. In concluding, the ape expresses a degree of satisfaction with his lot.

== Analysis ==
Walter Herbert Sokel has suggested that the story speaks to a conflict "between internal and external continuity in the ape's existence". The preservation of the life of the protagonist is dependent upon his casting off memory and identity; only by achieving the end of that internal identity could actual biological life be maintained. Thus, for the ape, "identity is performance"; "It is not a static essence, a given, but a constantly reenacted self-representation."

The motif of the changeability of identity may have ramifications in the context of Zionism and the Jewish diaspora, as "A Report to an Academy" first appeared in a Zionist magazine. Nicholas Murray briefly suggests in his 2004 biography of Kafka that the story is a satire of Jews' assimilation into Western culture.

The story's references to the protagonist's "apish past" ("äffisches Vorleben") have led some literary theorists to associate the story with evolutionary theory.

In J. M. Coetzee's novel Elizabeth Costello, the title character gives a central place to "A Report to an Academy" in her speech about vegetarianism and animal rights. She also suggests that Kafka may have been influenced by German psychologist Wolfgang Köhler's The Mentality of Apes, also published in 1917. However, historian Gregory Radick suggests that a more likely inspiration for Kafka was the work of the American psychologist Lightner Witmer. In 1909 Witmer staged a widely publicized test of the mental abilities of a vaudeville chimp named Peter. This test, conducted in front of a panel of scientists, included a demonstration of Peter's ability to say several words, including "momma." An alternative possibility — given that Kafka explicitly states in explaining the origin of the name "Red Peter" that he is not "the performing ape Peter" — is that Kafka had read one of the many newspaper reports about the vaudeville performing Peter, either when touring in France and Germany in 1908, or after a trip to the USA on his return to Europe which included a planned visit to Heidelberg.

In his introduction to his translation of the story, Mark Harman writes:

One could describe this particular story as a portrait of the artist as an ape, a parody of learned "human" discourse, a satire on Jewish assimilation, and more generally a tragicomic account of the cost of admission into supposedly "civilized" society.

== Adaptations ==
Mexican actor Humberto Dupeyron has performed an adaptation of this story as a play, The Gorilla.

An adaptation was broadcast in the BBC radio series Thirty-Minute Theatre on 7 December 1969.

In 1987 South African actor Marius Weyers performed an adaptation to rave reviews in Los Angeles. Critics noted the parallels with apartheid race science.

In 1989 the monologuist and writer Andrew Tansey adapted and premiered The Greatest Ape, an adaptation of the story, at the Edinburgh International Festival, before touring Britain and the United States. The critically acclaimed production was directed by Paul Dodwell.

In 2009 a theatrical adaptation by Colin Teevan opened at the Young Vic in London. The hour-long solo piece was directed by Walter Meierjohann, and Kathryn Hunter's performance as Red Peter the ape was widely acclaimed. In 2013 the play was set up at the Baryshnikov Arts Center.

The 2001 film Human Nature, written by Charlie Kaufman, is a loose adaptation of Kafka's short story.

In 2013 another adaptation of the story was staged in Montreal under the title Kafka's Ape, presented by independent theater company Infinitheatre. Guy Sprung directed Howard Rosenstein in the role of Red Peter.

In Ceridwen Dovey's 2014 story collection Only the Animals the story "Red Peter's Little Lady (Soul of Chimpanzee)" uses Kafka's story as the jumping-off point for a tale of a dead chimpanzee who recounts his experiences as an animal trained to act human.

The story was adapted as a comic album by Mahi Grand and published by French company Dargaud in 2022.
