= Destroyalldreamers =

Canadian instrumental post-rock band

- Also known as: thisquietarmy
- Origin: Montreal, Quebec, Canada
- Genres: Post-rock; Shoegaze
- Years active: 2002–2007
- Labels: Where Are My; Claire's Echo
- Members: Eric Quach, guitar Mathieu Grisé, guitar Shaun Doré, drums
- Past members: Michèle Martin, bass
- Website: destroyalldreamers.com

Destroyalldreamers was a Canadian four-piece instrumental post-rock band from Montreal consisting of guitarists Eric Quach and Mathieu Grisé, drummer Shaun Doré and former bassist Michèle Martin. Their sound has often been described as a mix of classic 1990s shoegazing with Godspeed You! Black Emperor-like aesthetics. They released two full-length studio albums, both of them on Montreal's independent record label Where Are My Records.

The quartet is known for their extensive use of effects pedals and for mixing elements of shoegaze, wall of sound and post-rock, which has had many fans categorize them as post-shoegaze. Although the group has shown interest in recording new material, they have been inactive since 2007 with its members pursuing other projects.

== History ==
Destroyalldreamers was formed in 2002 by guitarist Eric Quach and drummer Shaun Doré. The name Destroyalldreamers was taken from a phrase written on the disc of Montreal's influential experimental rock ensemble Thee Silver Mt. Zion's first release "He Has Left Us Alone but Shafts of Light Sometimes Grace the Corner of Our Rooms...". The whole inscription reads "destroy all dreamers w/debt+depression...".

The line-up was soon completed with the addition of guitarist Mathieu Grisé and bassist Michèle Martin, who contributed to Quach's and Doré's early compositions. Within a year, the band's self-titled debut EP Destroyalldreamers was released.

The four-piece went on to record their debut full-length album, the critically acclaimed À Coeur Léger Sommeil Sanglant [sic] in 2004, which gained the band recognition on the shoegazing scene and allowed them to contribute to various compilations in 2006, among such artists as Hammock and Eluvium, to name a few. The year of 2006 also saw the band record the EP Glare/Halo, released on Claire's Echo record label, a subsidiary of Clairecord. The EP consists of material that would later be presented on their second album, along with two exclusive compositions.

The recording of their second full-length album, entitled Wish I Was All Flames, was completed in the fall of 2006, but its release was put on hold until the fall of 2007 due to bassist Michèle Martin's departure from the group. Maxime Racicot, a close friend of the remaining members, replaced Martin for live performances which supported the release of the sophomore full-length. On October 21, 2007, a live show, which served as the album launch, was recorded at Divan Orange, a popular independent Montreal music venue. A blog entry on the band's myspace page on December 16, 2009, stated that this recording had been made available as a free download.

== Discography ==
=== Studio albums ===
- Destroyalldreamers, 2003 EP
- À Coeur Léger Sommeil Sanglant, 2004 LP
- Glare/Halo, 2007 EP
- Wish I Was All Flames, 2007 LP

=== Live album ===
- Live @ Divan Orange 2007-10-21, 2007

=== Compilations ===
- Je l'ai fait pour toi, 2003, released on Where Are My Records – Provided track Victoire sur le Soleil
- Never Lose That Feeling, Volume Two, 2006, released on Club AC30 – Provided cover version of Souvlaki Space Station by Slowdive.
- Ode to Roger, 2006, released on Autres Directions in Music and on Diesel Combustible – Provided cover version of a track from Propergol y Colargol's "Charly Roger..."

== Band members ==
=== Original line-up ===
The original line-up recorded all studio albums and performed together until the fall of 2006.

- Eric Quach – Guitar
- Shaun Doré – Drums
- Mathieu Grisé – Guitar
- Michèle Martin – Bass

=== Other musicians ===
Following Michèle Martin's departure in the fall of 2006, the group "got back together as an official three-piece" in 2007, with other musicians filling up on bass.

- Maxime Racicot – Bass on Live @ Divan Orange 2007-10-21

== Other musical projects ==
Guitarist Eric Quach is currently working on a solo ambient/drone project started circa 2005 under the name thisquietarmy, which is also the name of Quach's own independent record label. He has already released several recordings, including EPs, LPs and collaborations with such artists as Aidan Baker, notably from Toronto's drone metal band Nadja, with whom Quach has participated in a European Tour in 2009.

Since her departure from the band in late 2006, Michèle Martin has been working on her own self-proclaimed "classical romantic electronica" project Dianes in Danger, in which she plays most instruments, with the help of programmer/sound manipulator Erroir. She has also had guests of the Orchestre Métropolitain perform on some of her recordings.

Mathieu Grisé has released a few albums under his moniker Ixe-13, named after the Jacques Godbout 1972 film, and is also part of the collaborative effort Le Chat Blanc Orchestra with Pascal Asselin from Millimetrik.

== See also ==
- List of shoegaze musicians
- List of post-rock bands
- List of Montreal music groups
