= Infringement Festival =

- Location: Montreal

The infringement Festival is an international, interdisciplinary critical arts festival that features theatre, music, film, culture jamming, street performance and visual arts, with an emphasis on activist art and work that challenges the commodification of culture.

Conceptualized by theatre activist Donovan King, the festival was founded in Montreal in 2004 by King and fellow theatre activists Jason C. McLean and Gary St-Laurent as a response to high registration fees and conflict-of-interest sponsorships in the St-Ambroise Montreal Fringe Festival and the trademarking of the word "Fringe" by the Canadian Association of Fringe Festivals.

It has since spread to Ottawa, Toronto, Buffalo, Regina, Brooklyn and Bordeaux. Plans are also underway for possible events in Lockport, NY, Hamilton, Ontario and Barcelona.

The festival's mandate insists on no registration fees for participating artists, no ticket surcharge and only ethical sponsors that pose no conflict of interest.
