= Guy Sprung =

Canadian actor and theatre director

Guy Sprung (born on April 17, 1947) is a Canadian actor and theatre director. He lives in the Mile End area of Montreal and was the artistic director of Infinitheatre for 22 years. He retired and was succeeded by Zach Fraser in March 2021.

== Career ==
=== Theatrical career ===
While at McGill University in the early 1970s, with Fiona Reid and Ian D. Clark Sprung acted on stage with a troupe called Theatre Encounter in Montreal. Sprung became an assistant director at the Schiller Theater in Berlin. As director of Balconville by David Fennario, he traveled with the company on an international tour to England and Ireland. In 1972, with Maurice Colbourne and Michael Irving he co-founded the Half Moon Theatre in London, England, and was its first Artistic Director. He directed the opening production of In the Jungle of the Cities. Others he directed included Will Wat, If Not, What Will?, Fall In and Follow Me, Get Off My Back, Ripper!, The 3p Off Opera and Paddy. He also directed the community productions Spare Us a Copper and Driving Us Up the Wall.

Sprung was co-founder and first Artistic Director of the Toronto Free Theatre from 1982 to 1988. During this time, he conceived and founded the outdoor Shakespeare in High Park. He was an Associate Director at the Stratford Festival and interim Artistic Director of the Vancouver Playhouse Theatre Company, and he has taught at the National Theatre School of Canada and the Conservatoire d'art dramatique de Montréal.

In 1990, Sprung was invited to direct A Midsummer Night's Dream at the Pushkin Theatre in Moscow. The production ran in the repertoire for eleven years to sold-out houses. His experience in Russia inspired the work Hot Ice: Shakespeare in Moscow, A Director's Diary, "a combination of a travel journal, personal memoir, autobiography, manifesto, and director's notebook".

In 2001, his Montreal theatre company, Infinithéâtre, was invited to represent Quebec and Canada at the Cairo International Festival of Experimental Theatre in Egypt with its bilingual production of Samuel Beckett's Endgame/Fin de Partie. Sprung created the bilingual version, directed the production, and also played the part of Nagg when Marc Gélinas was in poor health condition to play the role he originated. Sprung is fluent in French and German and became proficient in Russian while directing in Moscow.

He also played Achenar in the 2004 adventure video game Myst IV: Revelation.

=== Literary career ===
Sprung was a theatre critic for the Montreal Star in the 1970s and a literary columnist for the Montreal Gazette in the 1990s. His published works include Hot Ice, a diary of directing Shakespeare in Russian at the Pushkin Theatre, and the plays Death And Taxes and Fight On!.

== Personal life ==
He was briefly married to actress Kate Trotter in the 1980s. He has three children.
