= Amy Blackmore =

Canadian impresario and artistic director

Amy Blackmore is a Montreal impresario and is the founder and artistic director of the Bouge d'ici Dance Festival. She is also the Executive and Artistic Director of MainLine Theatre and the St-Ambroise Montreal Fringe Festival. She has worked with a variety of theatre companies and festivals as a producer, performer or choreographer, such as the Montreal Highlights Festival, The Montreal Shakespeare Theatre Company and Infinitheatre. Blackmore is described as coming from a generation of artists that are taking charge of their own careers with a "DIY philosophy" towards producing.

== Education ==
Blackmore studied contemporary dance at Concordia University.

== Career ==
Blackmore began her career at the Fringe as an artist and volunteer at the St-Ambroise Montreal Fringe Festival at the age of 17. She quickly became interested in the festival's community. After a few years of creating shows, she became the festival's assistant producer. In 2011, Blackmore became the festival's director, replacing longtime producer Jeremy Hechtman.

In 2012, she assumed responsibility for the entire company that produces the Fringe, becoming MainLine Theatre's Executive and Artistic Director. Shortly thereafter, Blackmore was named Newsmaker of the Year for arts and culture by the Montreal Gazette, alongside Montreal comedian Sugar Sammy. Blackmore is responsible for the incorporation of visual arts programming into the Montreal Fringe, a festival primarily known for its performing arts.
