= Live @ Divan Orange 2007-10-21 =

Live album by Destroyalldreamers
- Released: 2009
- Recorded: October 21, 2007
- Genre: Shoegaze; Ambient; Post-rock
- Length: 50:15

Destroyalldreamers chronology
Wish I Was All Flames (2007)	Live @ Divan Orange 2007-10-21 (2009)

Live @ Divan Orange 2007-10-21 is a live album by the Montreal-based instrumental shoegaze band Destroyalldreamers which was released as a free internet download in 2009. It was recorded on October 21, 2007, at Divan Orange, a popular Montreal independent music venue. The performance was in support of their previous album Wish I Was All Flames, which was released in the same week.

== Track listing ==
The album includes material from their most recent LP, as mentioned earlier, as well as from their first album À Coeur Léger Sommeil Sanglant.

No.	Title	Length
1.	"Wish I Was All Flames"	3:38
2.	"Automne"	4:19
3.	"Orage"	7:28
4.	"A Summer Without You"	4:13
5.	"Destroy All Dreamers"	5:05
6.	"Victoire sur le Soleil"	3:48
7.	"Facultatives Imaginaires, en Robe et en Éclats"	8:03
8.	"Her Brother Played the Riot"	13:45

== Personnel ==
Destroyalldreamers

- Eric Quach - guitar, mastering
- Mathieu Grisé - guitar
- Maxime Racicot - bass guitar
- Shaun Doré - drums

Production

- Emmanuel Tremblay - recording
- Meryem Yildiz - photography
