= The Aphotic Season =

Studio album by October Sky
- Released: June 18, 2012
- Recorded: January – April 2011, Indigene Studio Montreal
- Genre: Rock, alternative, progressive
- Length: 45:58
- Label: Rocksector Records
- Producer: Luc Tellier

October Sky chronology
| Live in Montreal EP (2011) | The Aphotic Season (2012) |

Singles from The Aphotic Season
- 1. "Dark Vision" Released: June 18, 2012; 2. "Green And Beautiful" Released: October 30, 2012

The Aphotic Season is the second studio album by October Sky, released worldwide on June 18, 2012 with Rocksector Records, a Manchester-based record label.

The album was recorded, produced, mixed and mastered by Luc Tellier, who has worked with many Montreal bands such as Simple Plan and The New Cities. His list of clients also includes major labels such as Universal Music, Sony Music, EMI Music. The three last tracks come from the first album Hell Isn't My Home and the bonus track is only available on the Canadian & American release which also doesn't include the tracks from the first record.

== Track listing (UK release) ==
| No. | Title | Length |
|---|---|---|
| 1. | "Dark Vision" | 5:17 |
| 2. | "Prisoner of Nothing" | 3:46 |
| 3. | "Angel One" | 3:53 |
| 4. | "Air" | 5:12 |
| 5. | "Green And Beautiful" | 3:43 |
| 6. | "Fall Back Down" | 4:14 |
| 7. | "Distance" | 4:08 |
| 8. | "Sacrifice" | 3:39 |
| 9. | "The Message" | 6:28 |
| 10. | "Fear" | 5:38 |

Bonus Track (Canadian & American Release)
| No. | Title | Length |
|---|---|---|
| 1. | "Fall Back Down (Karl Raymond Remix)" | 7:08 |

The album has received relatively good reviews in the European countries. According to PlanetMosh.com, a heavy metal webzine in the United Kingdom, The Aphotic Season was given 8/10. It was also compared to the sound of Thirty Seconds to Mars and early Muse.

== Singles ==
Dark Vision is the first single released by the band on June 18, 2012 with a radio edit, bringing the length of the song to 3:41 instead of 5:17.

Green And Beautiful is the second official single released on October 30, 2012. A video produced and animated by Paul Kuchar from Kool Factor company received great reviews shortly after its release. Within 2 weeks, the video had reached 8 800 views on YouTube.. The video is made up of traditional hand drawn animation, set in a 3D space, adding a certain degree of depth.
