= Ghantous =

Ghantous or Gantous or Ghantus is a surname. It may refer to:

== Ghantous ==
- Raad Ghantous, Iraqi-born Assyrian American interior designer

== Ghantus ==
- Ghantus Haddad, birth name of Gregory IV of Antioch, Greek Orthodox Patriarch of Antioch from 1906 to 1928

== Gantous ==
- Paul Gantous, member of Canadian indie band Then One Day
