= Glare/Halo =

EP by Destroyalldreamers
- Released: March 2007
- Recorded: 2005–2006
- Genre: Shoegaze; Ambient; Post-rock
- Length: 32:58
- Label: Claire's Echo echo010

Destroyalldreamers chronology
À Coeur Léger Sommeil Sanglant (2004)	Glare/Halo (2007)	Wish I Was All Flames (2007)

Professional ratings
Review scores
Source	Rating
Heathen Harvest	(favourable)

Glare/Halo is a 2006 EP by the Montreal-based instrumental shoegaze band Destroyalldreamers, released on Clairecord's affiliated project Claire's Echo and distributed by Tonevendor. It was released as a limited edition 12-inch vinyl record, with only 300 copies available. The recording and post-production phases were completed in the first half of 2006, making the album available to pre-order in June 2006, although it was not released officially until March 2007.

The album contains the two exclusive tracks "Dead on Arrival" and "À la Guerre Comme à la Mer", as well as two compositions that later appeared on their second LP Wish I Was All Flames. The album opening track, "Her Brother Played the Riot", occupying almost half of the EP with its play time of close to 16 minutes, was separated into three parts for the LP.

== Track listing ==
No.	Title	Length
1.	"Her Brother Played the Riot"	15:59
2.	"Dead on Arrival"	6:22
3.	"A Summer Without You"	4:14
4.	"À la Guerre Comme À la Mer"	6:26

== Personnel ==
Destroyalldreamers

- Eric Quach - guitar, mixing, artwork, photography
- Mathieu Grisé - guitar
- Michèle Martin - bass guitar
- Shaun Doré - drums, mixing assistant

Production

- Shane Whitbread - recording
- Martin Valence - recording
- Harris Newman - mastering
- Abide Visuals - artwork design
