= Wish I Was All Flames =

Studio album by Destroyalldreamers
- Released: October 23, 2007
- Recorded: February 2005 – September 2006
- Genre: Shoegaze; Ambient; Post-rock
- Length: 46:26
- Label: Where Are My records WAM023

Destroyalldreamers chronology
Glare/Halo (2007)	Wish I Was All Flames (2007)	Live @ Divan Orange 2007-10-21 (2009)

Professional ratings
Review scores
Source	Rating
Lateral Noise	(favourable)
Idiomag	(?)

Wish I Was All Flames is the second studio full-length album by the Montreal-based instrumental shoegaze band Destroyalldreamers, released on October 23, 2007, on Where Are My records.

In December 2007, American webzine Somewhere Cold ranked Wish I Was All Flames No. 8 on their 2007 Somewhere Cold Awards Hall of Fame.

== Release history ==
Recording for the album took place over the course of 18 months in 2005 and 2006, while the band was also recording its EP Glare/Halo for a different record label. The two albums share a few tracks: "A Summer Without You" and the three-part composition "Her Brother Played the Riot", presented as a single track on the EP. Percussions were recorded by Shane Whitbread in February 2005 and Martin Valence in June 2005, in Chambly and Montreal respectively, while the remaining instruments were recorded in Montreal at Thisquietarmy HQ and the Studio du Carré Rouge from 2005 to September 2006.

The album would therefore have been ready for a release in fall 2006, but bass guitarist Michèle Martin's departure from the band at that time delayed the post-production process, while also compromising the possibility of a supporting tour. It was later announced on the group's MySpace blog that the release was going to take place in October 2007 and that it would be supported by a small-scale tour, since the band had recruited a friend to assume the bass guitarist position.

On October 21, 2007, they performed a launch show to celebrate the release at the Montreal music venue Divan Orange. The performance was recorded and contributed all of the songs to their live album, Live @ Divan Orange 2007-10-21, released in 2009.

== Track listing ==
No.	Title	Length
1.	"Wish I Was All Flames"	3:38
2.	"Cendres en Transe"	3:00
3.	"Automne"	4:26
4.	"A Summer Without You"	4:23
5.	"Le Pianiste Météorologique"	3:52
6.	"My Eyes Were on the Dancefloor"	3:46
7.	"Perdre Est une Question de Méthode"	7:13
8.	"Her Brother Played the Riot"	6:16
9.	"Her Brother Played the Riot"	5:13
10.	"Her Brother Played the Riot"	4:44

== Personnel ==
Destroyalldreamers

- Eric Quach - guitar, mixing, artwork design
- Mathieu Grisé - guitar
- Michèle Martin - bass guitar
- Shaun Doré - drums, mixing

Production

- Shane Whitbread - recording for drums on tracks 3, 7, 8, 9 and 10
- Martin Valence - recording for drums on tracks 1, 2, 4, 5 and 6
- Harris Newman - mastering
- Meryem Yildiz - photography
