= Live in Montreal (October Sky EP) =

Live in Montreal EP

Live album by October Sky
- Released: June 26, 2011
- Recorded: Club Soda
- Genre: Rock, Alternative, Progressive
- Length: 36:19
- Label: none
- Producer: October Sky

October Sky chronology
Green and Beautiful EP (2010)	Live in Montreal EP (2011)	The Aphotic Season (2012)

Live in Montreal EP is October Sky's fourth release, and third EP, released exclusively as a digital download on June 26, 2011.

It was recorded live at Club Soda, a music venue in Montreal, Quebec on April 30, 2011. The album's graphic design was done by October Sky, and the cover photographs were taken and stylized by photographer Eric Rouleau.

== Track listing ==
No.	Title	Length
1.	"Sacrifice (Live @ Club Soda – April 30)"	4:09
2.	"Hell Isn't My Home (Live @ Club Soda – April 30)"	5:10
3.	"Hit the Ground (Live @ Club Soda – April 30)"	4:18
4.	"Forever Lost (Live @ Club Soda – April 30)"	7:47
5.	"The Message (Live @ Club Soda – April 30)"	7:22
6.	"Fear (Live @ Club Soda – April 30)"	7:31
