= Green and Beautiful EP =

EP by October Sky
- Released: September 21, 2010
- Recorded: Rattlebox Studios
- Genre: Rock, Alternative, Progressive
- Length: 50:55
- Label: none
- Producer: Brian Moncarz

October Sky chronology
Hell Isn't My Home (2008)	Green and Beautiful EP (2010)	Live in Montreal EP (2011)

Green and Beautiful EP is October Sky's third release, and second EP. It was released as a limited edition offer on September 21, 2010, at Cafe Campus in Montreal, Quebec, as only 500 physical copies were manufactured.

The 5 studio tracks of the EP were recorded, produced, mixed and engineered by Brian Moncarz at Rattlebox Studios, and mastered by João Carvalho at João Carvalho Mastering, both located in Toronto, Ontario. The live tracks were recorded live at Theatre Le National in Montreal, Quebec on November 28, 2009. The EP also features a dance remix of "Hell Isn't My Home," the title track and second single from October Sky's debut album Hell Isn't My Home, by friend DJ Nota. The graphic design was done by October Sky, and all photographs were taken, conceptualized and stylized by Alexandra Jacques.

== Track listing ==
No.	Title	Length
1.	"Green and Beautiful"	3:32
2.	"Home"	4:17
3.	"Dark Vision (Part One)"	1:35
4.	"Dark Vision (Part Two)"	3:32
5.	"Dark Vision (Part Three)"	1:22
6.	"Sacrifice (Live @ Le National)"	3:50
7.	"Failure (Live @ Le National)"	5:33
8.	"Between These Four Walls (Live @ Le National)"	8:35
9.	"Forever Lost (Live @ Le National)"	9:23
10.	"Fear (Live @ Le National)"	5:35
11.	"Hell Isn't My Home (Remix by DJ Nota)"	3:35
