= Jason C. McLean =

Canadian actor (born 1977)

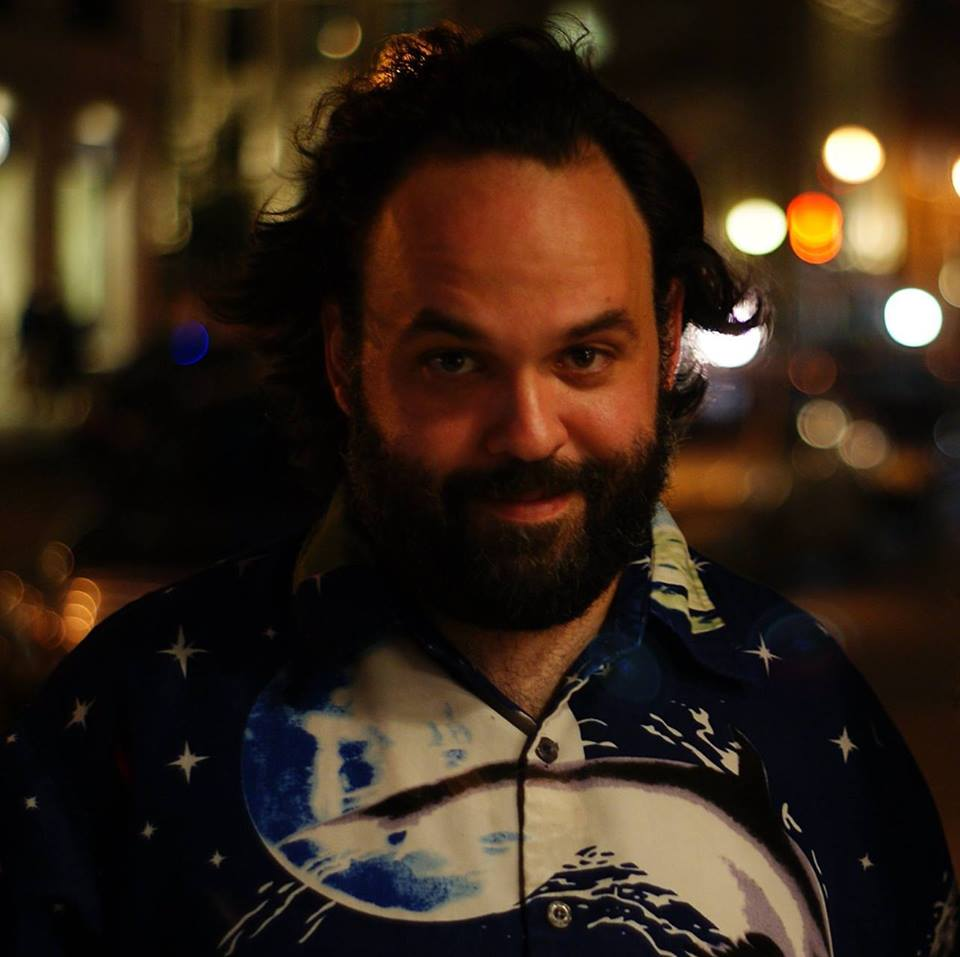
- Jason C. McLean in 2014
- Born: May 9, 1977 (age 49); Montreal, Quebec, Canada

Jason C. McLean is a Montreal-based writer, journalist, actor, theatre activist and a co-founder of the Forget the Box Media Collective where he served as the Editor-in-Chief of the group's principal site ForgetTheBox.net.

Born in Montreal in 1977, McLean has performed on stage, on film, on Web-TV and in numerous culture jams.

In 2003, he joined Optative Theatrical Laboratories and has since performed with this dramatic collective in the long-running theatre experiment Car Stories, the anti-racist deconstruction Sinking Neptune and various guerrilla theatre performances targeting Starbucks, American Apparel and other companies.

In 2004, McLean co-founded the infringement Festival with fellow Optative members Donovan King and Gary St-Laurent. The festival is currently in five cities. McLean is an organizer of the international circuit and the annual Montreal event.

In 2009, he co-founded the Forget The Box Media Collective. He served as Editor-In-Chief and contributed to the site regularly before its closure. He was also the in-character host of JC Sunshine's Fireside Chat, a comedic web-TV talk show with fictional narrative elements produced by Forget The Box Studios.

McLean holds a Bachelor of Arts degree in Journalism from Concordia University, was the original editor of the now-defunct Indie Theatre Times and Review and has been published in the Montreal Mirror.

McLean is a former member of the Quebec Drama Federation board of directors.

== Organization ==
- Forget The Box Media Collective 2009 to present
- infringement Montreal 2004 to 2014
- infringement International 2005 to present
- Optative Theatrical Laboratories 2004 to present

== Theatre (limited) ==
- Car Stories/sCARe Stories Optative Theatrical Laboratories, Montreal, Ottawa, Toronto, Buffalo, New York City (2003–present)
- Sinking Neptune II Optative Theatrical Laboratories, Montreal, Guelph, Quebec City (2008)
- The Mutilation of San Pedro Frente Ampilio Oppositor & Optative Theatrical Laboratories, 2007
- Sinking Neptune Optative Theatrical Laboratories, Montreal, Halifax, Annapolis Royal (2006)
- Rachel's Words: The Words About the Words Optative Theatrical Laboratories, 2005
- Dead Dolls Cabaret Travesty Theatre, 1999-2005
- Mumbo, Jumbo: King Leopold's Opus Travesty Theatre, 2002

== Film and Video (limited) ==
- JC Sunshine's Fireside Chat Forget The Box, bi-weekly, beginning 2009
- Car Stories: The Church of Capitalism Guerilla Video Productions, 2007
- American Apparel: Fake Revolution Guerilla Video Productions, 2006
- Death by Latte CPO Productions, 2005
- The Legend of Jackie Robinson Circle K Productions, 2005

== Journalism ==
- "Staging Dissent" by Jason McLean, Montreal Mirror, September 2, 2004
