= Donovan King =

Professional actor, teacher, historian, and tour guide from Montreal, Quebec

- Born: 1972 (age 53–54); Montreal, Quebec
- Occupations: Acting; Teaching; Directing; Dramaturgy
- Known for: Experimental theatre artist

Donovan King is a professional actor, teacher, historian, and tour guide from Montreal, Quebec. He is also a performance activist and experimental theatre artist . Known for his commitment to education and community, King assisted with the establishment of the Montreal Fringe Festival in 1991, is the author of Doing Theatre in Montreal and he set up the Montreal Infringement Festival in 2004. In 2012, King founded Haunted Montreal, a theatrical ghost tour company which he operates, researches and writes scripts for, and performs with.

== Background ==
King holds a Masters of Fine Arts degree in Theatre Studies from the University of Calgary, a Bachelor of Fine Arts in Drama in Education from Concordia University, a Bachelor of Education from McGill University and a Diplome d’Études Collegiales in Acting from John Abbott College. He is the author of Optative Theatre: A Critical Theory, and he facilitates various activist campaigns and drama classes in Montreal. He has worked with other theatre activists sincluding Augusto Boal, Andrew Boyd of the Billionaires for Bush, Reverend Billy, Stephen Duncombe, Larry Bogad, Kathryn Blume, Kurt Schneiderman, Jason C. McLean, Gary St. Laurent.

As the co-founder of the Optative Theatrical Laboratories (OTL) King strives to revitalise theatre as an agent for social change through experimental practice, critical theory, and sustained performance. The OTL designs interconnected theatrical campaigns such as Car Stories, that target instances of oppression, and uses several performance techniques: culture-jamming, Viral Theatre, Sousveillance Theatre, meme-warfare, Electronic Disturbance Theater, and Global Invisible Theatre.

In 2006, King took issue with racism that he holds isinherent in what has been called "Canada’s First Play" – the 1606 The Theatre of Neptune (Le Théâtre de Neptune) by Marc Lescarbot. OTL staged a counter-performance called "Sinking Neptune" in Annapolis Royal on the day of the "400th Theatre Anniversary" (November 14, 2006), in order to protest the original.

In 2012, Donovan King was invited to the first World Fringe Congress in Edinburgh, Scotland, a gathering of Fringe administrators from round the world. King published an article following the Congress called " World Fringe Congress to welcome infringement festival" that examines some of the more contentious issues, such unethical corporate sponsorship, pay-to-play fees and the trademarking of the word "Fringe" in Canada.

King was invited back to the 2nd World Fringe Congress in 2014, again in Edinburgh, to deliver a workshop called "A World Fringe Philosophy" where he called on stakeholders to create policies at Fringe festivals to protect artists, spectators and communities from excessive corporate manipulation.

The 3rd World Fringe Congress in 2016 was moved to Montreal and hosted by the Canadian Association of Fringe Festivals (CAFF), an organization that trademarked the word "Fringe" in Canada. King responded by moving the Montreal Infringement Festival from June to November, to coincide with the World Fringe Congress and also created the World Infringement Congress, held immediately after the original event, to examine issues being ignored, such as the "Fringe" trademark.

This time, all potential World Fringe Congress delegates had to apply to participate. The applications of King along with other organizers at the Montreal and Buffalo Infringement Festivals were rejected without explanation, raising questions about exclusion and censorship at Canadian Fringe Festivals. Buffalo burlesque artist Cat McCarthy wrote an article in Buffalo's The Daily Public denouncing the decision and calling for a resolution to the conflict. King responded by inviting CAFF representatives to a Canadian Parliamentary-style debate at the World Infringement Congress regarding their trademark on the word "Fringe".

More recently, King has been challenging systemic racism and discrimination in Montreal's tourism industry, specifically at Tourisme Montréal, the A.P.G.T. (Association professionnelle des guides touristiques) and the City of Montreal, which has by-Law G-2 which prohibits tour guides outside a cartel of mostly white guides.

King has also been trying to preserve local Irish-Montreal heritage.

== Career ==
=== Partial directing ===
- Grease', JPPS, Montreal, 2006
- The Lysistrata Project, OTL, Montreal, 2003
- Miss Julie: a theatrical experiment into the psychosis of a. strindberg, University of Calgary, 2000
- Waiting For God, Nickel & Dime Productions, Calgary, 1999
- Call Me, Infinitheatre, Montréal, 1999
  - MECCA Award – Best Production (semi-professional)
- Godspell, Lewisham Operatic Society, London, England, 1996
- Mrs. Fieldstone’s Water Retention Problem, Greene Pressure Theatre, Montréal, 1995
- The Tinker’s Wedding, Wahoo Family Theatre, 1994
- The Misanthrope, Wahoo Family Theatre, 1993
- Tiger Mouth, Kindergarten Players, Montréal, 1993

=== Filmography ===
- My Grad Date (2004)
- Death by Latté (2004)
- The Legend of Jackie Robinson (2003)

=== Partial performance theater ===
- La Grande Masquerade, Groupe-Conseil L’Entracte, 2007–present
- Les Fantômes du Vieux-Montréal, GuidaTour, 2006–present
- Sinking Neptune, OTL, Montreal, 2005–2006
- Car Stories, OTL, Montreal, 2001–present
- Wal*Jam, OTL, Montreal, 2003
- Quartier des contre-Spectacles, OTL/Place des Arts, Montreal, 2003
- Stones Scandal, Galway Arts Festival, Ireland, 2001
- FJOLZ!, Elvagel Performance Festival, Elsinore, Denmark, 2001
- CorporACT, Auckland, New Zealand, 1997–1998
- Monsterworld Inc., Chateau Greystoke, Montréal, 1994

=== Partial traditional theater ===
- The Captives, Knebworth House, England
- Ever After, Out Of Our Heads & One Yellow Rabbit, Calgary
- The Tempest, Stage 2 Productions, Auckland, New Zealand
- Anne of Green Gables, Montreal Concordia Players & ACT, Hong Kong
- Manhattan, Je Vous Dis, Theatre 21st Century, Montréal
- Who Ran Off With Dr. Seuss?, Wahoo Family Theatre Co., Montréal Fringe Fest.
- The Misadventures…., Concordia University Theatre Department
- Rising of the Moon, Wahoo Family Theatre Co., Montréal
- St. George & the Dragon, Christmas Mummering Company, Montréal
- L’Avare (The Miser)', Cleante Thé à l’âtre, Montréal Fringe Festival

=== Bibliography ===
- A Dramaturgical Toolbox for Sinking Neptune, Optative Free Press, 2005
- Optative Theatre: a critical theory for challenging Oppression and Spectacle, University of Calgary, 2004
- The Warders Bible, Vardon PLC, London, 1997
- Strategies to enhance live entertainments at London and York Dungeons, Vardon PLC, London, 1996
- Doing Theatre in Montreal, Quebec Drama Federation, 1995
