= First You Get the Sugar =

Canadian musical group

- Origin: Montreal, Quebec, Canada
- Genres: Alternative rock, indie rock, pop rock, rock
- Years active: 2007–2015
- Members: Adam Kagan; Mick Mendelsohn; Dan Moscovitch; Alex Silver
- Website: firstyougetthesugar.com (defunct)

First You Get the Sugar was a Canadian four-piece rock band based in Montreal, Quebec, consisting of Adam Kagan (guitar and vocals), Mick Mendelsohn (bass and vocals), Dan Moscovitch (drums) and Alex Silver (guitar and vocals).

The band's musical style was described as a mix of "post-punk, new wave, classic rock, 1960s pop and 1970s soul/funk." In January 2012, The Gazette's 2012 Montreal Music Preview described them as "danceable, giddily hooky...[and] going places."

== History ==
The band began in 2007 as a combination of Kagan's and Mendelsohn's former bands. The name was chosen as a reference to a quotation from the "Lisa's Rival" episode of the American animated sitcom television series The Simpsons, in which the quotation itself is a homage to the American crime film Scarface (1983).

They recorded their self-produced, self-titled debut album independently in 2009 to 2010 in Montreal, and had the album mastered at Masterdisk in New York City, New York. The album was released in May 2011.

In December 2011, the band was selected to record at Converse's Rubber Tracks recording studio in Brooklyn, New York, where they recorded three songs in a 16-hour recording and mixing session with Grammy Award-winning engineer Geoff Sanoff. While at the studio, the band was interviewed by CNN and MTV.

The first track, "Pearson", was released in January 2012. In June 2012, Rubber Tracks set up a studio in Toronto, and the band performed there, as part of the North by Northeast Festival.

In January 2012, the band was interviewed on CBC Radio and was the subject of a feature article in The Gazette in January 2012, which described the track as "pretty and propulsive," and remarked that "if McCartney suddenly finds he's missing a song, he'd be wise to look here." When they performed at Pop Montreal in September, they garnered a rave review from the same newspaper.

In March 2012, the band played in the Canadian Music Week festival in Toronto, Ontario, to positive reviews.

They debuted the second song from the Rubber Tracks sessions, "Hannah", on Montreal radio station CHOM-FM (97.7) on March 29, 2012, and released the song later that week to more radio play on the station.

In October 2014, the band released the song "Foreign Lands" and its accompanying video, which was chosen as the "Big Shiny New Song of the Week" by CHOM-FM.

The band played New York's CMJ Music Marathon on October 23, 2014. Their Foreign Lands EP was released on October 28, 2014. It was described as a "major leap forward in their sound" and as having a "classic rock foundation with a modern indie rock twist."

First You Get the Sugar performed at Pop Montreal on September 17, 2015. That was followed by a Halloween show at a club; the band's Facebook posts ceased in December 2015 and its website is defunct.

== Members ==
- Adam Kagan
- Mick Mendelsohn
- Dan Moscovitch
- Alex Silver

== Discography ==
=== Albums ===
- First You Get the Sugar (self-released, 2011)
- Foreign Lands (self-released EP, October 2014)

=== Singles ===
- "Tell Your Mama"/"Sabre Rattlin'" (self-released, 2011)
- "Pearson" (self-released, 2012)
- "Hannah" (self-released, 2012)
- "Foreign Lands" (self-released, 2014)

== See also ==
- List of alternative rock bands
- List of indie rock musicians
- List of Montreal music groups
- Music of Quebec
