= À Coeur Léger Sommeil Sanglant =

Studio album by Destroyalldreamers
- Released: November 2004
- Recorded: December 2003–March 2004; Montreal
- Genres: Shoegaze; Ambient; Post-rock
- Length: 57:34
- Labels: Where Are My records WAM017

Destroyalldreamers chronology
Destroyalldreamers (2003)	À Coeur Léger Sommeil Sanglant (2004)	Glare/Halo (2007)

Professional ratings
Review scores
Source	Rating
Allmusic	4/5 stars
Montreal Mirror	(8/10)
Exclaim!	favourable
Somewherecold	5/5 stars
Splendid	favourable

À Coeur Léger Sommeil Sanglant [sic] (loosely translated from French as "To light heart, bloody slumber") is the official debut studio album by Montreal-based instrumental shoegaze band Destroyalldreamers, released in November 2004 on Where Are My records. The album has received generally favourable reviews and was often put among the favourites of independent magazine and webzine critics of 2004.

The album was recorded by Patrick Lacharité in his apartment, in Montreal, over the course of four months in 2003 and 2004.

== Track listing ==
No.	Title	Length
1.	"Zeta Reticuli Express"	5:02
2.	"Orage"	7:56
3.	"Victoire sur le Soleil"	3:55
4.	"Facultatives Imaginaires, en Robe et en Éclats"	9:26
5.	"The Sky Was Glorious for a Moment"	8:46
6.	"Destroy All Dreamers"	5:33
7.	"Swirling Colours Sink"	7:55
8.	"Sombrer dans la Folie"	3:42
9.	"Ghost Guitar in the Shell"	5:21

== Personnel ==
Destroyalldreamers

- Eric Quach – guitar, cover art
- Mathieu Grisé – guitar
- Michèle Martin – bass
- Shaun Doré – drums

Production

- Patrick Lacharité – recording, mixing, artwork design
- Mike Baker – mastering
