= Then One Day =

- Origin: Montreal, Quebec, Canada
- Genres: Indie Pop
- Years active: 1983–1987
- Labels: World Wide, VOT
- Past members: André Allore; Terry Armstrong; Paul Gantous; James Rennie

Then One Day was a Canadian indie pop band from Montreal, Quebec, who were active from 1983 to 1987.

== Origins ==
Then One Day was formed in 1983 by guitarist André Allore, bassist Paul Gantous and drummer James Rennie. Vocalist Terry Armstrong was recruited to round complete the quartet.

The band released the EP, Style Life, in 1986 which was recorded at Silent Sound Studios in Montreal and contributed to the Listen 2 compilation of Montreal music, on VOT records. They were one of the prominent pop bands on the Montreal music scene in the mid 1980s. In 1987, the band were preparing to tour with new material which didn't evolve.

Then One Day played their last show at Montreal's Club Soda in 1987, with the unforeseen announcement of the band splitting up. (Joe Vidyo)

== Personnel ==
=== Lineup ===
- André Allore – Guitar, Vocals (1983–1987)
- Terry Armstrong – Lead Vocals (1983–1987)
- Paul Gantous – Bass Guitar (1983–1987)
- James Rennie – Drums, Vocals (1983–1987)

== Discography ==
- Live at Station 10 (1985)
- Style Life (1986)
- Listen 2 – A Faze Compilation (1986)

== Track listing – Live at Station 10 ==
No.	Title	Length
1.	"Dancing (With The Wrong Girl)"	3:05
2.	"Supreme Madness"	3:55
3.	"Catch Me If You Can"	4:15
4.	"Between The Lines"	3:23
5.	"Walking in the Sun"	2:33
6.	"Style Life"	3:52
7.	"Through My Window"	4:20
8.	"Please My Cindy"	3:59
9.	"Fade To Black"	5:59
10.	"Glamour"	4:15
11.	"I Said To Mia"	5:06
12.	"Me, I Can't"	3:34
13.	"Just A Matter Of Time"	4:09
14.	"Watch Me Stray"	3:56
15.	"I Got To Get Away"	5:22
16.	"Steppin' Stone"	4:00
17.	"Don't Touch Me"	4:06
18.	"She's Feeling Pretty"	3:36
19.	"Civil Servant"	2:51
20.	"Jackie's Dying"	5:35
21.	"San Francisco"	3:28
22.	"You Really Got Me"	2:59

== Track listing – Style Life ==
No.	Title	Length
1.	"Catch Me If You Can (written by Allore, Gantous, Rennie)"	4:38
2.	"She's Feeling Pretty (written by Allore, Rennie)"	3:49
3.	"Style Life (written by Armstrong)"	3:46

== Track listing – Listen 2 – A Faze Compilation ==
No.	Title	Length
5.	"Just A Matter Of Time (written by Allore, Rennie)"	4:30

== See also ==
- Music of Montreal
- Canadian rock
- List of Canadian musicians
- List of bands from Canada
- Category:Canadian musical groups
