= October Sky EP =

EP by October Sky
- Released: September 23, 2006
- Recorded: Studio Sixieme Sens
- Genre: Rock, Alternative, Progressive
- Producer: October Sky

October Sky chronology
October Sky EP (2006)	Hell Isn't My Home (2008)

October Sky EP is October Sky first studio recording, which was self-released on September 23, 2006.

The EP was recorded and engineered by Jimmy Bourgoing, and produced, mixed and mastered by the band, all at Studio Sixieme Sens in Longueuil, Quebec. The album art and design was done by Liam Oscar Thurston at TAXI Agency.

== Track listing ==
No.	Title	Length
1.	"Forever Lost"	6:05
2.	"Between These Four Walls"	5:13
3.	"Behind You"	4:24
4.	"Hit the Ground"	3:56
