= Hell Isn't My Home =

Studio album by October Sky
- Released: September 2, 2008
- Recorded: Home studio
- Genre: Rock; alternative; progressive
- Length: 39:39
- Label: none
- Producer: October Sky

October Sky chronology
October Sky EP (2007)	Hell Isn't My Home (2008)	Green and Beautiful EP (2010)

Hell Isn't My Home is the debut full-length studio album by October Sky, released on September 2, 2008. It was originally released independently on October 10, 2007, but was released officially as a double album under TRX Distribution, a Quebec-based record distributor. The second disc is a bonus disc which features the first three songs of the band's first EP October Sky EP. In 2009, the company was bought out by DEP under Universal Music Canada, and October Sky and Universal failed to reach an agreement to continue distributing the album.

The record was recorded, produced, mixed and mastered by the band in their home studio in Montreal. The album art and design was done by graphic designer and art director Vill Mak.

The first single from the album is "Hit the Ground (October Sky song)," which was playlisted on over 20 commercial radio stations across Canada. The music video for "Hit the Ground" debuted at #4, ahead of Madonna and Justin Timberlake, on MusiquePlus' "Plus sur commande," a television show playing the most requested music videos of the week., and was also playlisted on MuchLOUD. The second single is the title track "Hell Isn't My Home."

The album won the Toronto Exclusive Magazine Award in 2008 for Best Provincial Rock CD Album.

== Track listing ==
No.	Title	Length
1.	"The Darkest Light"	1:25
2.	"Sacrifice"	3:37
3.	"Hell Isn't My Home"	4:24
4.	"The Message"	6:26
5.	"Black to Blue"	2:35
6.	"Hit the Ground"	3:51
7.	"Interlude"	1:22
8.	"Into Their Memories"	4:50
9.	"Fear"	5:38
10.	"The World in Stereo"	5:26

Bonus disc
No.	Title	Length
1.	"Forever Lost"	6:05
2.	"Between These Four Walls"	5:13
3.	"Behind You"	4:24
