= Ol' Savannah =

Ol' Savannah is a Montreal-based folk band known for its vocal harmonies and use of traditional Appalachian and Cajun instruments. Ol' Savannah has released six albums and two EPs, performed at a number of festivals, and toured in Canada, the US, and Europe.

== History ==
Ol' Savannah was founded by Speedy Johnson and Bartleby J. Budde. The two began writing songs together in 2009, influenced by folk, roots, and blues artists Mississippi Fred McDowell and Mississippi John Hurt. In 2011, they independently released their self-titled album; Underneath the Old Red Barn followed in 2012. 2013's Death on the Mountain was released through the Coup d'Griffe label.

Ol' Savannah has performed frequently on Halifax, Nova Scotia's waterfront as part of the Halifax International Busker Festival. In Quebec, the group participated in the Festival Fringe in Montreal in 2012 and 2014. In 2014, as part of the Montreal Fringe Festival, the group received an honourable mention at the Frankie Awards for Greenland Productions' music award. Ol' Savannah played the Festival International du Folk Sale in June 2013 in Ste-Rose-du-Nord.

In early 2015, the band released an EP, Don’t Let It Reign. In June 2015, they performed at the Montreal Folk Festival on the Canal; in May 2016, the group played Paddlefest in St-Andrews, New Brunswick.

In 2017, Ol' Savannah independently released an album, Burden. In October, that year the band accepted an invitation to perform at Festival Le Grand Soufflet in Brittany, France, and followed that with a six-week tour in western Europe, which took the group to Belgium, Holland, Germany, Switzerland, and Italy, as well as France. Since 2013, Cult MTL readers have consistently voted Ol' Savannah into the "Best Country/Folk Act" category in the annual "Best of Montreal" survey. 2022 saw Ol' Savannah No. 2 in "Best Country/Folk Act" and No. 4 in "Best Band" behind Arcade Fire, The Damn Truth, and Half Moon Run.

The group's Hobo EP, released in the winter of 2018, received a nomination by GAMIQ for Folk EP of the year. Ol' Savannah then released their first live album in April 2018, entitled Fill My Cup Up at De Melkbus: Live in Dordrecht, Netherlands. The release of their fifth full-length album was followed by a second European tour, which included performances at Festival Labadoux in Belgium and Gate To Southwell Festival in England.
