= Balconville =

Play by David Fennario

- Written by: David Fennario
- Original language: Bilingual (English & French)
- Genre: Drama
- Setting: Pointe-Saint-Charles

Premiere
- Date premiered: 1979-01-02
- Place premiered: Centaur Theatre

Balconville is a bilingual play by Canadian playwright David Fennario. It is a two-act drama that is considered to be Fennario's best known play. Balconville was the first bilingual play in Canadian theatre history, and about a third of the play's dialogue is in French.

The play was first performed at the Centaur Theatre in 1979, under the direction of Guy Sprung. It opened to highly favourable reviews and subsequently toured the country and made its way to Europe, where the reviews were not nearly as enthusiastic. The play has been a "work in progress" and was greeted with high praise during a 1992 production at the Centaur. It won the Floyd S. Chalmers Canadian Play Award in 1980. The play has been remounted many times.

The story takes place in Pointe-Saint-Charles, a neighbourhood of Montreal that was one of Canada's first industrial slums. It unfolds during a hot summer in which Montreal's major league baseball team, the Montreal Expos, were playing well. Three families and the neighbourhood delivery boy sit on balconies in the heat of a Montreal summer, forced to listen to election promises in both languages from the broadcast truck a local politician who is running for re-election. The play explores the socio-economic rumblings of this ethnic melting pot, including the ongoing French/English question as it was perceived at that time.

In 2005, a sequel play by Fennario, Condoville was staged by Montreal's Centaur Theater.
