= Infinitheatre =

Infinithéâtre is an anglophone theatre located in the Mile End area of Montreal.

It was founded in 1988 by Marianne Ackerman and Clare Schapiro as "Théâtre 1774", and its name was changed to Infinithéâtre in 1997, when Artistic Director Guy Sprung took over. Now under the Artistic Direction of Zach Fraser, Infinithéâtre develops and produces new plays written or adapted by Québec artists.

== History ==
Infinithéâtre was founded in 1988 by Marianne Ackerman and Clare Schapiro as "Théâtre 1774". In 1997, its name was changed to Infinithéâtre, when Guy Sprung was named Artistic Director. Under the artistic direction of Zach Fraser, Infinithéâtre has developed and produced new plays written or adapted by Québec artists. During this period, the company established several festivals to showcase new plays by Montréal's English-language theatre companies, including November to Remember in 1997, May to Play in 1998, and the Infinite Festival in 1998.

In October 1999, Infinithéâtre converted an abandoned building in Old Montréal into a performance venue, staging a bilingual production of Samuel Beckett's Endgame/Fin de partie. The next year, the company collaborated with OMNIBUS, a Francophone theatre company, to co-produce Farce, a bilingual play by Michael Mackenzie. In January 2001, Byron Ayanoglu's Food/Bouffe was staged at the Lion d'Or as part of the Montréal Highlights Festival.

In September of that year, Infinithéâtre presented its bilingual production of Samuel Beckett's Endgame/Fin de partie at the Cairo International Festival of Experimental Theatre. In June and July 2002, the company staged Jacob Richmond's Small Returns and Trevor Ferguson's Long, Long, Short, Long at Monument-National. Ferguson's play was subsequently nominated for Best New Québec Text at the 2002 Soirée des Masques. Workshops held at Infinithéâtre also contributed to a 2003 production of Shakespeare's Richard III at Manitoba Theatre Centre.

From 2003 to 2005, the company staged works such as Guy Sprung's adaptation of Major Barbara, Yann Martel's The Facts Behind the Helsinki Roccamatios, Sprung's Death and Taxes, and Carolyn Guillet's Seventeen [Anonymous] Women. A French-language adaptation of Ferguson's Long, Long, Short, Long, titled Le Pont, was also presented by Compagnie Jean-Duceppe in 2005.

In 2006, Infinithéâtre launched The Pipeline, a workshop and public-reading series for plays under consideration for future productions. In 2007, The Facts Behind the Helsinki Roccamatios was presented at the National Arts Centre as part of Québec Scene. The company's 2007–2008 season featured works by Daniel Danis, Jason Maghanoy, and Trevor Ferguson, alongside Action Infini, an educational initiative for CEGEP and university students. In May 2008, the production of The Facts Behind the Helsinki Roccamatios was presented at Toronto's Factory Theatre.

== Awards ==
In 1995, Sliding In All Directions, a mosaic written by four separate playwrights and directed by Guy Sprung, wons the Masque (the all-Québec Theatre Awards) for best English production of the year.

== Funding ==
Infinitheatre is supported by foundations, sponsors and individuals. They are also awarded the occasional grant from the government.
