= Imago Théâtre (Montreal, Quebec) =

Feminist theatre company in Monetral, Quebec

Imago Théâtre is a professional feminist theatre company based in Montreal, Canada. The company was founded in 1987 by Andres Hausmann, Ray Tomalty, and Kelly Patterson, and is now led by its current Artistic and Executive Director, Krista Jackson.

The theatre uses a Pay-What-You-Decide model wherein theatergoers at Imago are allowed to choose their own custom price for their entertainment after they are done with what they signed up for.

== History ==
Imago was originally led under Andres Haussman, who had a focus on showing experimental bilingual creations at the theatre and abroad, but was later led by many other people, including Clare Schapiro who changed the theatre's focus from bilingual creations to stories about the experiences of women.

In 2013, Micheline Chevrier became the Artistic and Executive Director of Imago. Under Chevrier’s leadership, Imago officially became a feminist and artist-run theatre company. Its work from then on surrounded questions about human nature, climate change, politics, power dynamics, and the treatment of women and marginalized groups in society.

In 2022 the company announced the appointment of Krista Jackson as the new Artistic and Executive Director.

== Programming ==
=== Productions ===
Imago has presented a variety of plays, early years of the company saw interpretations of plays by Samuel Beckett (The Shorter Plays and Conversation), Harold Pinter (Other Plays and Pinteriana), Milan Kundera (Jacques and His Master), Heiner Müller (Quartet) and a collective creation about the invention of the atomic bomb, Incandescent (which played in both French and English).

Imago presents their productions at a variety of Montreal performing arts spaces, including Centaur Theatre, The Segal Centre for the Performing Arts, Bain Mathieu, Theatre La Chappelle, Espace Go and the Monument-National’s Studio Hydro-Québec.

Notable Productions

Ana, By Clare Duffy (Scotland) and Pierre Yves Lemieux (Québec) Winter 2011 in Montreal, at Espace GO, Spring 2012, Scotland Tour (a co-production with Stellar Quines, Edinburgh).

If We Were Birds, by Erin Shields directed by Micheline Chevrier. Fall 2013, at Centaur Theatre.

Intractable Woman, by Stefano Massini translated by Paula Wing, directed by Micheline Chevrier. Winter 2017, at Centaur Theatre.

Other People’s Children, by Hannah Moscovitch directed by Micheline Chevrier and Amanda Goldberg (Assistant Director). Fall 2018, at the Centaur Theatre.

Persephone Bound, Created by Léda Davies and Jed Tomlinson. Additional text by Michaela Jeffery. A co-presentation with Geordie Theatre and Screaming Goats Collective, Fall 2019, at the DB Clarke Theatre.

The Tropic Of X, By Caridad Svich directed by Sophie Gee and Alessandra Tom (Assistant Director) Winter 2020, at the Centaur Theatre.

Okinum by Émilie Monnet, co-directed by Émilie Monnet and Emma Tibaldo. Co-production with Onishka at Centaur Theatre as a part of Brave New Looks 2021.

Foxfinder, by Dawn King directed by Cristina Cugliandro. Presented at Montreal, arts interculturels. Fall 2022.

Redbone Coonhound by Amy Lee Lavoie And Omari Newton directed by Micheline Chevrier and Kwaku Okyere. An Imago Theatre and Tarragon Theatre Co-Production. Winter 2023 at Théâtre Denise-Pelletier.

The Flood by Leah-Simone Bowen directed By Yvette Nolan. Presented at Centaur Theatre in February 2024.

=== ARTISTA ===
ARTISTA is a mentorship program for women, gender-diverse, transgender, and non-binary people, ages 17–22.

The goal of the program stated by Imago is to encourage participants to develop self confidence, artistic vocabulary, and gain a sense of community. They receive mentorship from professional artists (both local and national).

=== The Creators Circle ===
The Creator’s Circle brings together playwrights based in Montreal and nationally to workshop their plays in development and create a community space for artistic exchange. The plays and artists selected centralize questions of gender, while engaging in so-called 'radical' creation practices, according to Imago.

=== Nested Circles ===
Nested Circles is an artist residency program curated by Lindsay Lachance that pairs new artists with more experienced artists with the intention of the pair sharing and working on their individual projects with support from one another, according to Imago.

== Accessibility ==
Imago has produced digital productions for blind and visually impaired audiences. In 2022 Imago began including French subtitles at every performance to grow in popularity with Francophone audiences in the city. Imago also offers a mask mandatory performance during the run of their productions. Imago also operates on a Pay-What-You-Decide model that has customers choose their pricing after the fact instead of before what they watch.
