= List of music venues in Montreal =

The following list of music venues in Montreal indicates significant performance locations in Montreal:

== Indie ==
- Casa Del Popolo
- La Sala Rossa
- Mile End Cultural Centre
- Divan Orange (closed)
- Mademoiselle
- Club Lambi (closed)
- Le Belmont
- Café Campus
- Petit Campus
- The Corona Theatre / Théâtre Corona
- Barfly
- O Patro Vys
- La Tulipe (closed)
- Le National
- Cabaret Juste Pour Rire (closed)
- Théâtre Fairmount (formerly Cabaret du Mile-End)
- Centre St-Ambroise
- The Rialto Theatre / Théâtre Rialto
- CFC
- Mission Santa Cruz
- L'Escogriffe
- Théatre Plaza
- Ukrainian Federation
- Sat
- Salon Il Motore (closed, replaced by Bar Le Ritz)
- Cabaret Underworld
- Théâtre Telus
- Brasserie Beaubien
- Quai des Brumes
- Bar Le Ritz PDB
- P'tit Ours (formerly known as Ursa)

== Rock ==
- Backstreet (1990–1994)
- Backstreet Underground (1996–1999)
- Bar Chez Swann (1981–1993)
- Bar St-Laurent 2
- Cabaret Just For Laughs (closed)
- Café Campus (since 1966)
- Café Chaos (closed)
- Cathouse (1994–1996)
- Club Sensation (closed)
- Club Rage (1994–1996)
- Jailhouse Rock Café (1990–2001)
- Jupiter Room
- Katacombes (closed)
- L'Abreuvoir
- La Brique (1982–1993)
- La Terrasse (closed)
- Le Bar Les Retrouvailles (closed)
- Les Foufounes Électriques (since 1983)
- Mademoiselle
- Petit Campus
- Pub St. Paul
- Purple Haze (1992–1998)
- Rockpile (closed)
- Salle L'Intro (closed)
- Sam's Rock Bar (1990–1993)
- Station 10 (1974–1994)
- Studio Just For Laughs (closed)
- The Terminal Showbar (closed)
- Théâtre Telus (formerly Metropolis)
- Whiskey's Rock Bar (1989–1996)

== Classical ==
- Lambda School of Music and Fine Arts
- Église du Très-Saint-Nom-de-Jésus

== All ages ==
- Shaika cafe
- La Sala Rossa
- Club Soda

== Chamber music concert halls (500 -) ==
- Redpath Hall
- Chapelle historique du Bon-Pasteur
- Pollack Hall
- Tanna Schulich Hall
- Salle Pierre-Mercure
- Salle Claude Champagne
- Salle de récital du CMADQ
- Salle de concert du CMADQ
- La Sala Rossa

== 1,000+ capacity venues ==
- The Bell Amphitheatre
- Place des Arts
- Centre Pierre Péladeau
- Salle Claude-Champagne
- Club Soda
- Les Foufounes Électriques
- Théâtre Saint-Denis
- Oscar Peterson Concert Hall
- MTelus (formerly known as Métropolis)
- The Medley (closed)
- The Rialto Theatre / Théâtre Rialto
- Le Studio
- The Spectrum / Le Spectrum de Montréal (closed)
- L'Olympia
- Théâtre Telus
- New City Gas

== See also ==
- List of Montreal musicians
- List of Montrealers
