= St-Ambroise Montreal Fringe Festival =

Fringe festival in Quebec

- Genre: Concert dance Drag queen Fringe theatre Recital; Repertory theatre
- Date: June
- Frequency: Annual
- Locations: Montreal, Quebec, Canada
- Inaugurated: 1990
- Attendance: 60000+
- Patron: McAuslan Brewing
- Website: http://montrealfringe.ca/

The St-Ambroise Montreal Fringe Festival is a festival that hosts fringe theatre, repertory, dance, music, and drag-queen performances in Montreal, Quebec, Canada. The festival is held annually and lasts for 20 days in June. The festival was previously run by Jeremy Hechtman and Patrick Goddard, but Hechtman stepped down in 2010 after being in the position for 15 years. The festival has been run since 2011 by choreographer Amy Blackmore. McAuslan Brewing sponsors the St-Ambroise Montreal Fringe Festival and several other festivals in Montreal, including Pop Montreal, the Montreal World Film Festival, and the Fantasia Festival. The 2007 festival featured a mass fake marriage for theatre-goers at the beginning of the festival and then a corresponding mass fake divorce at the end symbolised by the eating of timbits.
