= October Sky (band) =

Canadian rock band

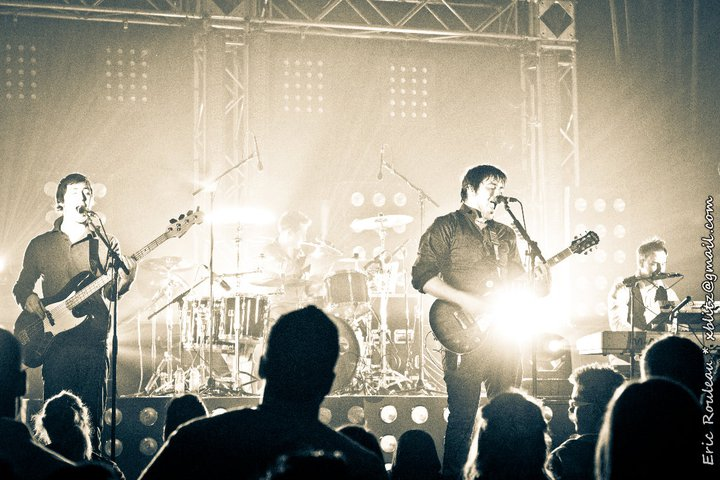
- live concert at Club Soda in Montreal (2011)

Background information
- Origin: Montreal, Quebec, Canada
- Genres: Rock; Electronic
- Years active: 2000–present
- Members: Karl Raymond; Alex Racine
- Past members: Andrew Walker (2007 to 2012); Gabriel Lobato (2000 to 2007); Yanik Rouleau (2004 to 2014); Julien Laframboise-Poitras
- Website: octobersky.ca

October Sky is a Canadian rock band from Montreal, Canada. Formed in 2000, the group currently consists of lead vocalist and guitarist Karl Raymond and drummer Alex Racine. The band's early music, including their debut album Hell Isn't My Home, has been described as progressive. They later incorporated electronic elements into their sound on subsequent releases. The Aphotic Season marked the beginning of this stylistic shift, while their most recent EP, Rise, represented a significant evolution in their musical direction.

To date, October Sky have released two full-length albums—Hell Isn't My Home (2008) and The Aphotic Season (2012)—and three EPs: October Sky EP (2006), Green and Beautiful EP (2010), and Rise (2015).

== History ==
=== Early years (2000–2005) ===
October Sky originated in the suburbs of Montreal in 2000, when high school friends Karl Raymond and Alex Racine began playing hard rock music together. With the addition of keyboardist Yanik Rouleau in 2004, their musical style evolved toward a more progressive and alternative sound.

Shortly after Rouleau joined the band, they entered and won a local battle of the bands competition called Exposure, competing against 85 bands. The positive reception encouraged them to embark on a small tour in regional areas of Quebec in 2005, including shows in and around Montreal. During this period, they also won another battle of the bands competition, Concours Studio Sixième Sens.

The prize for the latter competition included a substantial amount of recording time, during which they produced their first eponymous EP. At Studio Sixième Sens, the band learned fundamental recording techniques and were given the opportunity to experiment, helping them further define their developing sound.

=== First EP (2006–2007) ===
October Sky self-released their first EP in 2006, highlighted by the band's first self-produced concert, which drew an audience of approximately 450 fans and friends.

The band's next major step was relocating to Toronto, Ontario, where they lived for eight months to explore the city's strong independent music scene. During this period, they entered Toronto Indie Week, where they were named a "Top Finalist" among 370 North American bands. After performing 18 concerts across the Toronto Metropolitan Area and gaining experience within the music industry in Canada's largest city, they returned to Montreal and recruited bassist Andrew Walker in early 2007.

During the summer of 2007, the band spent much of their time writing and recording in their newly built home studio. By late autumn, they were nearing completion of a ten-track album. On October 10, 2007, October Sky independently released their debut album, Hell Isn't My Home, at Café Campus in Montreal to an audience of about 500 attendees.

Shortly thereafter, the band entered a battle of the bands competition called Omnium du Rock. Although they finished second in the finals, they were approached by one of the judges, an agent for the Montreal-based record distribution company TRX Distribution.

=== Hell Isn't My Home (2008–2009) ===
October Sky signed a distribution deal with TRX Distribution in the summer of 2008 and officially released Hell Isn't My Home on September 2, 2008, both online and in all Archambault music stores in Quebec and Ontario. The band held album launch events for the media on September 2 at Café Campus in Montreal and on September 3 at The Rivoli in Toronto.

To promote the album, the band embarked on a cross-Canada tour of 21 shows in 16 cities, ranging from Sherbrooke, Quebec, to Vancouver, British Columbia, between September 18 and October 31, 2008. During this period, they also opened for Mobile on several occasions.

The album received positive media attention and gained radio play on more than 20 commercial radio stations across Canada. The music video for "Hit the Ground" debuted at number 4 on MusiquePlus's Plus sur commande, ranking ahead of artists such as Madonna and Justin Timberlake. The video was also added to the playlist of MuchLOUD. October Sky received three Toronto Exclusive Magazine Awards for the album Hell Isn't My Home.

In early 2009, during the Canadian winter, October Sky was invited to perform twice at the Féerie des Glaces festival in Mont-Tremblant, Quebec, where they opened for classic rock artist Michel Pagliaro.

Later in 2009, TRX Distribution was acquired by distribution company DEP under Universal Music Canada. October Sky and Universal were unable to reach an agreement to continue distributing Hell Isn't My Home.

The band then entered what they intended to be their final competition, the Global Battle of the Bands (GBOB), an international contest. They won the Montreal regional finals in May and advanced to the Canadian National Finals at the Envol and Macadam Festival in Quebec City, where they opened for Alexisonfire and Bad Religion. Their victory qualified them to compete in the World Finals in London in 2010.

=== Green and Beautiful EP and Europe (2010–2011) ===
In January 2010, October Sky travelled to Toronto to record a three-song demo with producer Brian Moncarz at Rattlebox Studios, co-owned by Moncarz and Grammy-winning producer David Bottrill. The demo became the foundation for Green and Beautiful EP, released on September 21, 2010. The EP also includes several live tracks and a remix of "Hell Isn't My Home" by DJ Nota.

In April 2010, the band travelled to London, UK, to perform at The Scala in the World Finals of the GBOB competition, where they competed against entrants from 18 other countries.

Later that summer, October Sky performed in an acoustic tent at the Osheaga Festival, in association with War Child. To promote Green and Beautiful EP, the band then toured France and Belgium on an 11-day run in November and December 2010.

In November 2011, the band performed an acoustic set on the Quebec television programme L'échelle du talent: Zéro à 1000, which aired on V Télé during its first season. They were invited back at the start of the following season as part of a "best of" series.

In March 2011, October Sky performed at Canadian Music Week in Toronto and later headlined a show at Club Soda in Montreal, where they recorded Live in Montreal EP. Less than a month later, they returned to London to perform in the Discovery 2 Showcase for members of the UK music industry and local fans. They subsequently returned to Toronto to appear in another showcase as part of North by Northeast in June, followed by two performances at the Festival d'été de Beloeil in Beloeil, Quebec, including an opening set for comedian Rachid Badouri.

From mid-September to mid-November 2011, the band undertook a two-month tour of the UK to build their audience, performing more than 20 shows in over ten cities. They officially released Hell Isn't My Home in the UK on October 3, 2011, along with the single "Hit the Ground", which received radio play on NME Radio, TotalRock Radio, East Kent Radio, Emma Scott Presents, and other stations.

=== The Aphotic Season (2012) ===
Shortly after returning from their UK tour at the end of 2011, October Sky recorded seven songs with producer Luc Tellier. On April 2, 2012, the band announced their forthcoming album, The Aphotic Season, which was released worldwide on June 18, 2012. Later that year, on October 30, 2012, they released the album's second single, "Green and Beautiful".

The song—originally the title track of their prior EP—was remixed by Luc Tellier and included on the album as a single. The accompanying music video, produced and animated by Paul Kuchar of the Kool Factor company, received positive reviews shortly after its release. Within two weeks, the video reached 8,800 views on YouTube. The video features traditional hand-drawn animation set within a 3D environment to create a sense of depth.

=== Rise (2015) ===
In 2014, October Sky spent the year in the studio writing and recording new material with producer Paul Milner. They wrote more than 15 songs and selected seven for an EP titled Rise. The seven-track EP was released in October 2015 and was followed by a 32-show tour across the United States in spring 2016.

From Rise, the band released two singles: "The Moment" and "Break Me If You Can", the latter accompanied by an official music video that premiered exclusively worldwide on Yahoo!. On November 29, 2016, October Sky released a "live off the floor" session titled Rise Sessions, created in collaboration with longtime friend Gabriel Lobato. The band produced multi-angle live performance videos for the tracks "Break Me If You Can", "Live Again", and "All This Sound".

== Discography ==
=== Albums ===
- Hell Isn't My Home (2008)
- The Aphotic Season (2012)

=== EPs ===
- October Sky EP (2006)
- Green and Beautiful EP (2010)
- Rise (2015)
