= David Fennario =

Canadian playwright (1947–2023)

- Born: 26 April 1947
- Died: 16 September 2023 (aged 76); Montreal, Quebec, Canada
- Occupation: Playwright
- Notable work: Balconville

David William Fennario (born David Wiper, 26 April 1947 – 16 September 2023) was a Canadian playwright, best known for Balconville (1979), his bilingual dramatization of life in working-class Montreal, for which he won the Floyd S. Chalmers Canadian Play Award. A committed Marxist, Fennario was a candidate for the Union des forces progressistes in 2003 and for Québec solidaire in 2007. He has been the subject of two National Film Board of Canada documentaries, David Fennario's Banana Boots and Fennario: His World On Stage.

His pen name, "Fennario," given to him by a former girlfriend, is from a Bob Dylan song, "Pretty Peggy-O."

Fennario died on 16 September 2023, at the age of 76.

== Works ==
- Without a Parachute (1972) (journals)
- On the Job (1976) (play)
- Nothing to Lose (1977) (play)
- Balconville (1979) (play)
- Joe Beef (1984) (play; based on the life and times of Joe Beef)
- Doctor Thomas Neill Cream (1988) (play)
- The Murder of Susan Parr (1989) (play)
- The Death of René Lévesque (1991) (play)
- Gargoyles (1997) (play)
- Banana Boots (1998) (play)
- Condoville (2005) (play)
- Bolsheviki (2010) (play)
- Motherhouse (2014) (play)

== Electoral record ==
2007 Quebec general election: Verdun
Party	Candidate	Votes	%	±%
Liberal	Henri-François Gautrin	12,204	40.94	-11.58
Parti Québécois	Richard Langlais	8,688	29.15	-1.23
Action démocratique	Sylvie Tremblay	5,239	17.58	+6.27
Green	Pierre-Yves McSween	1,868	6.27	+3.99
Québec solidaire	David Fennario	1,430	4.80	+3.52*
Christian Democracy	Gilles Noël	118	0.40	+0.04
Bloc Pot	Sala Samghour	106	0.36	-0.88
Independent	Robert Lindblad	80	0.27	+0.08
Marxist–Leninist	Normand Fournier	74	0.25	-0.01
Total valid votes		29,807	99.00	–
Total rejected ballots		302	1.00	-0.33
Turnout		30,109	64.45	+1.44
Electors on the lists		46,714	–	–
Liberal hold		Swing		-5.18

2003 Quebec general election: Westmount–Saint-Louis
Party	Candidate	Votes	%	±%
Liberal	Jacques Chagnon	18,330	80.23	+1.06
Parti Québécois	Denise Laroche	2,372	10.38	-3.52
Action démocratique	Nathalie Beaupré	959	4.20	+0.73
UFP	David Fennario	718	3.14	–
Bloc Pot	David John Proctor	223	0.98	–
Equality	Don Donderi	182	0.80	-1.15
People's Front	Diane Johnston	64	0.28	+0.11
