= David Rotenberg (author) =

Canadian author and theatre director (1950 - 2003)

- Born: David Charles Rotenberg; 1949 or 1950 (Note: Rotenberg was 52 in 2002, and 62 in 2012.); Toronto, Canada
- Died: November 9, 2023 (aged 72–73)
- Education: B.A. (Toronto), M.F.A. (Yale),
- Alma mater: University of Toronto
- Occupations: Theatre professor, Director, Master acting teacher, Novelist, Playwright, Screenwriter
- Spouse: Susan Santiago
- Children: 2, Joe and Beth
- Parents: Cyril Rotenberg; Gertrude Rotenberg
- Relatives: (brothers) Robert, 2 others; (grandparents) Max • Sarah
- Writing career
- Years active: 1971–2023
- Genres: Detective fiction, historical fiction, thriller, science fiction
- Notable works: Zhong Fong mysteries; Shanghai; The Junction Chronicles
- Website: www.davidrotenberg.com

David Charles Rotenberg (1950 – 9 November 2023) was a Canadian author and professor emeritus of theatre studies at York University. He also founded and served as an artistic director of the Professional Actors Lab in Toronto.

Early in his career, he worked as a theatre director in New York City, directing two Broadway shows before returning to Toronto in 1987. In 1994, he directed the first Canadian play staged in the People's Republic of China. His writing career began in 1998 with the five-book Zhong Fong mystery series set in modern Shanghai and the historical fiction novel Shanghai. He later wrote The Junction Chronicles, set in The Junction, Toronto, and started a science fiction series in 2017.

== Early life and education ==
Rotenberg was born and raised in Toronto, He was the son of Dr. Cyril Rotenberg, a physician, and Gertrude Ruth "Gertie" Rotenberg. Rotenberg had three brothers. One of his younger brothers is Robert Rotenberg, a Canadian criminal lawyer and author. David Rotenberg graduated with a Bachelor of Arts from the University of Toronto. He left Toronto in 1971.

== Career ==
=== Theatre director and graduate work (1971–1987) ===
David Rotenberg taught in British Columbia, where he established the acting program at Simon Fraser University. He directed a production of Bertolt Brecht's Baal in 1973. He founded the Professional Actors Lab in Toronto, training actors such as Rachel McAdams and Tom Cavanagh. He also directed productions at major Canadian theatres, including the Stratford Festival and the Canadian Stage Company.

Rotenberg lived in the United States for fourteen years. He earned his Master of Fine Arts degree in directing from the Yale Drama School in 1976. He lived in New York City for ten years, working as a freelance director, participating in regional theatre, and directing the Broadway shows The News and The 1940's Radio Hour. Rotenberg stated that living in Manhattan influenced his work, even after returning to Canada. Rotenberg later moved to New Orleans, where he was on the faculty of Tulane University.

=== Acting teacher and international director (1987-2023) ===
Rotenberg returned to Toronto in 1987, where he taught graduate students at York University. He attempted to resume his directing career but struggled to find work, possibly due to his Broadway experience, according to one account.

"I was a professional theatre director with two Broadway shows to my credit, dozens of regional theatre credits and I ran a major American regional theatre so it was a bit of shock to me when I returned to Canada, where I'd been born and raised, to find that the Canadian theatre community wanted nothing to do with me. Apparently I was a traitor. If I had spent twenty minutes directing in Eastern Europe rather than twenty years directing in America I believe I would have been welcomed back by the Canadian theatre with open arms."

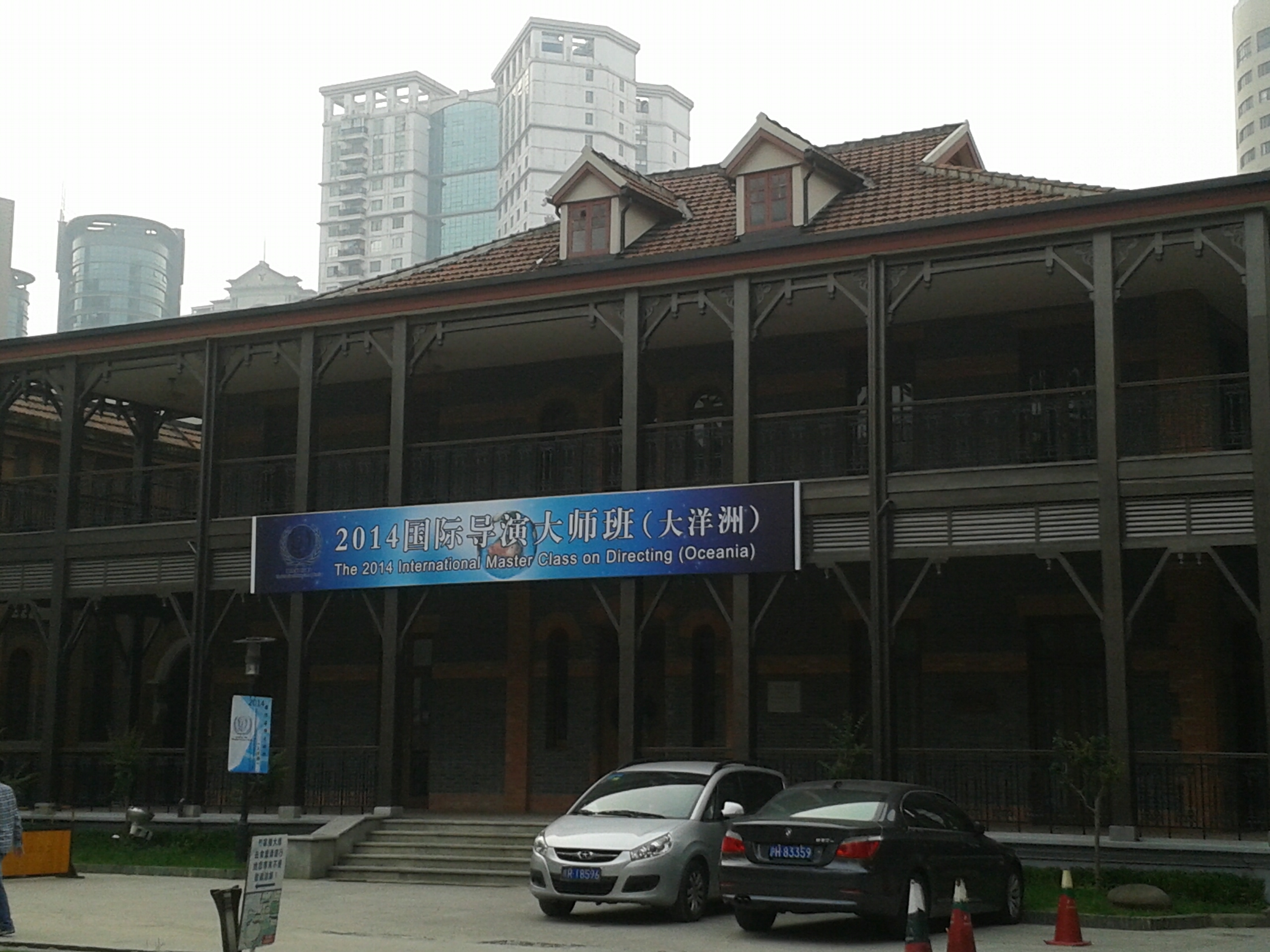
Shanghai Theatre Academy

Rotenberg continued to occasionally direct plays and television in Canada and abroad. In 1994, he directed George Ryga's The Ecstasy of Rita Joe at the Shanghai Theatre Academy, the first Canadian play produced in China with a Chinese cast and creative team. He noted that the play's subject matter, a young First Nation woman leaving the reserve for the city, was not easily understood by the Chinese audience. Despite cultural and language barriers, the production saw "limited" success.

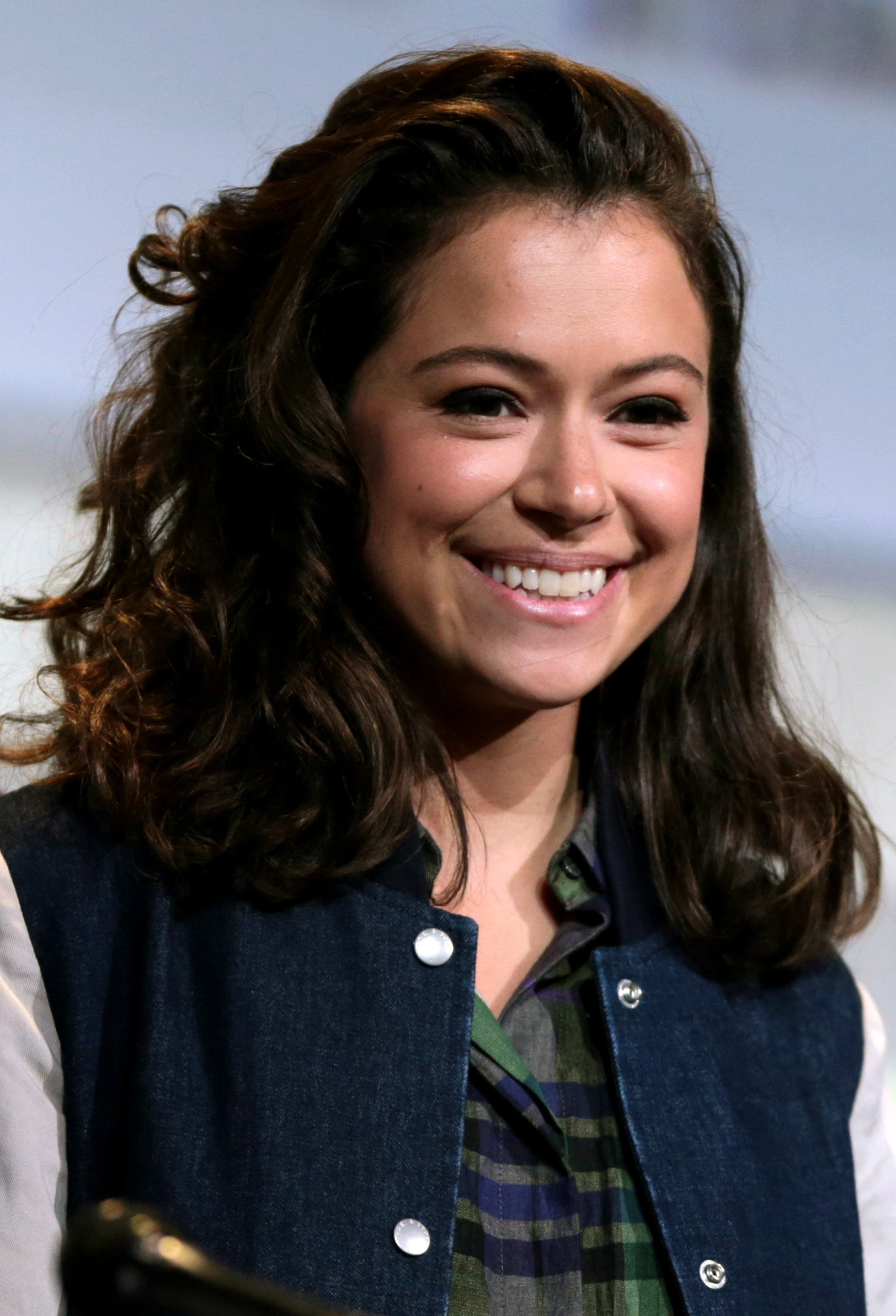
Tatiana Maslany

==== Other teaching projects and screen coaching ====
In 2000, David Rotenberg, along with David Julian Hirsh and entertainment lawyer Michael Levine, proposed a high-level actor training program to the Canadian Film Centre. Eight years later, the CFC launched a new actor's conservatory and an international co-production training program.

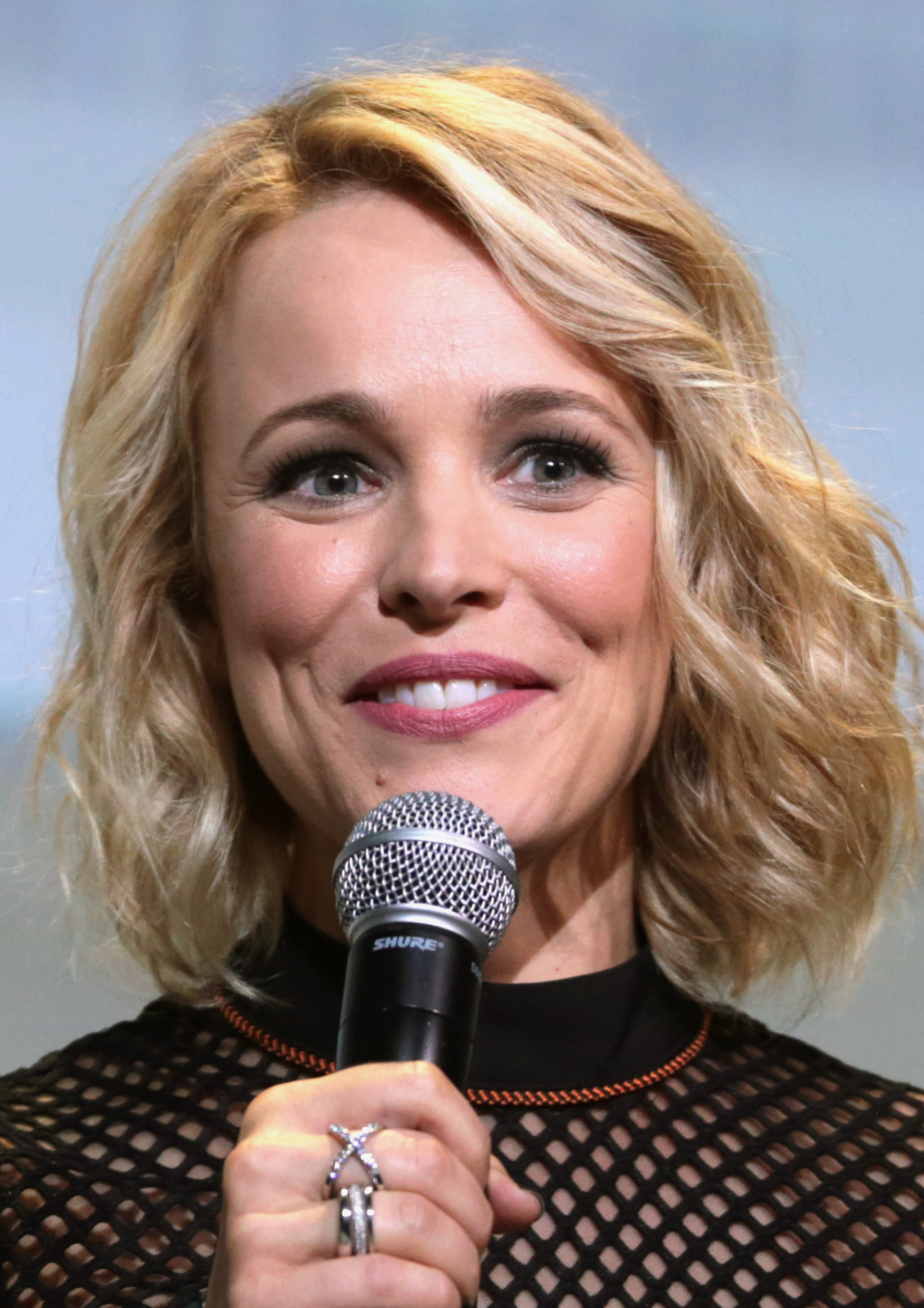
Rachel McAdams

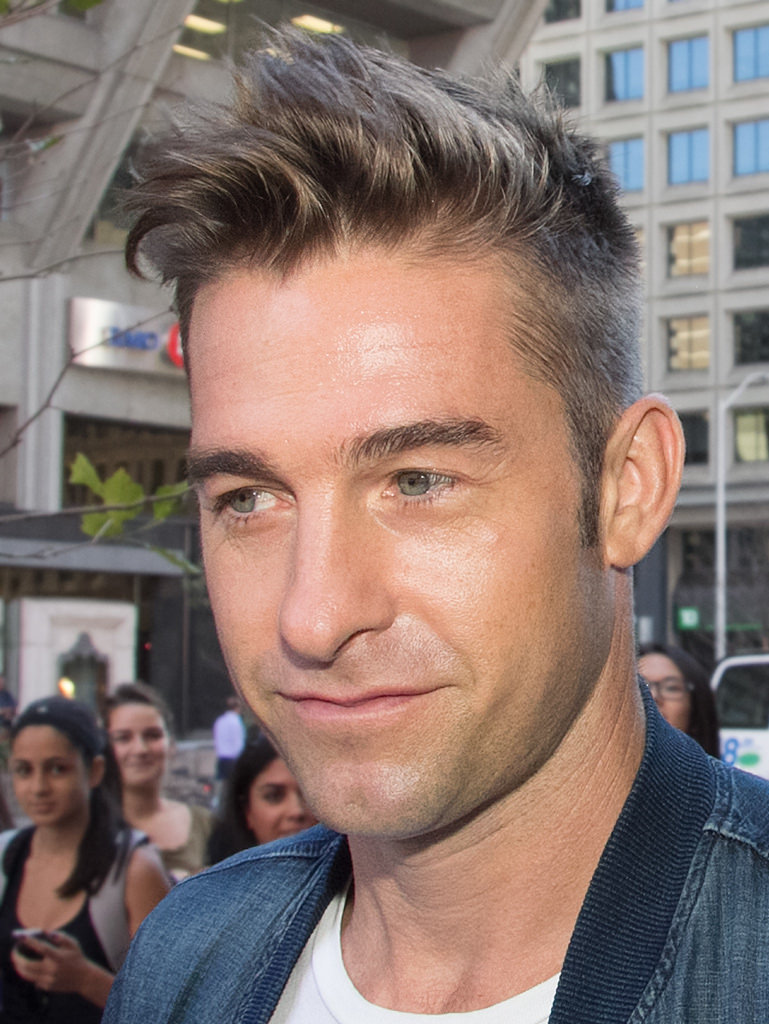
Scott Speedman

In 2003, Rotenberg founded the Professional Actors Lab and also taught at Equity Showcase Theatre. Rotenberg worked with approximately 75 actors at any given time, and his students included Tatiana Maslany, Rachel McAdams, Scott Speedman, Sarah Gadon, Ennis Esmer, Patrick J. Adams, David Julian Hirsh, Jonas Chernick, Shawn Doyle, Polly Shannon, and Demore Barnes.

Rotenberg also taught at the National Theatre School of Canada, the University of Cape Town, and Princeton University, and taught professional classes in other North American cities. He served as acting coach for My Secret Identity and Friday the 13th: The Series and as a private acting coach for the new Kung Fu on CBS.

=== Author ===
Rotenberg began writing following his experience of rejection by the Toronto theatre community. He wrote film scripts, stage plays (including an adaptation of The Great Gatsby), and novels.

It is a pleasure to read intelligent thrillers by Canadian writers. David Rotenberg ... is a man of many talents who brings his substantial experience in the theatre to his novels. Not only are they extremely literate and sophisticated, they boast truly inventive characters. Rotenberg ... knows well how to build suspenseful momentum in telling a story.

— Valerie Senyk

==== Novels ====
David Rotenberg authored twelve novels across the mystery, science fiction, and historical fiction genres, with many optioned for film and television. His experience at the Shanghai Theatre Academy inspired his first novel, The Shanghai Murders (1998), followed by four more in the series. The five Zhong Fong novels gained a following and were optioned for film and television (HBO).

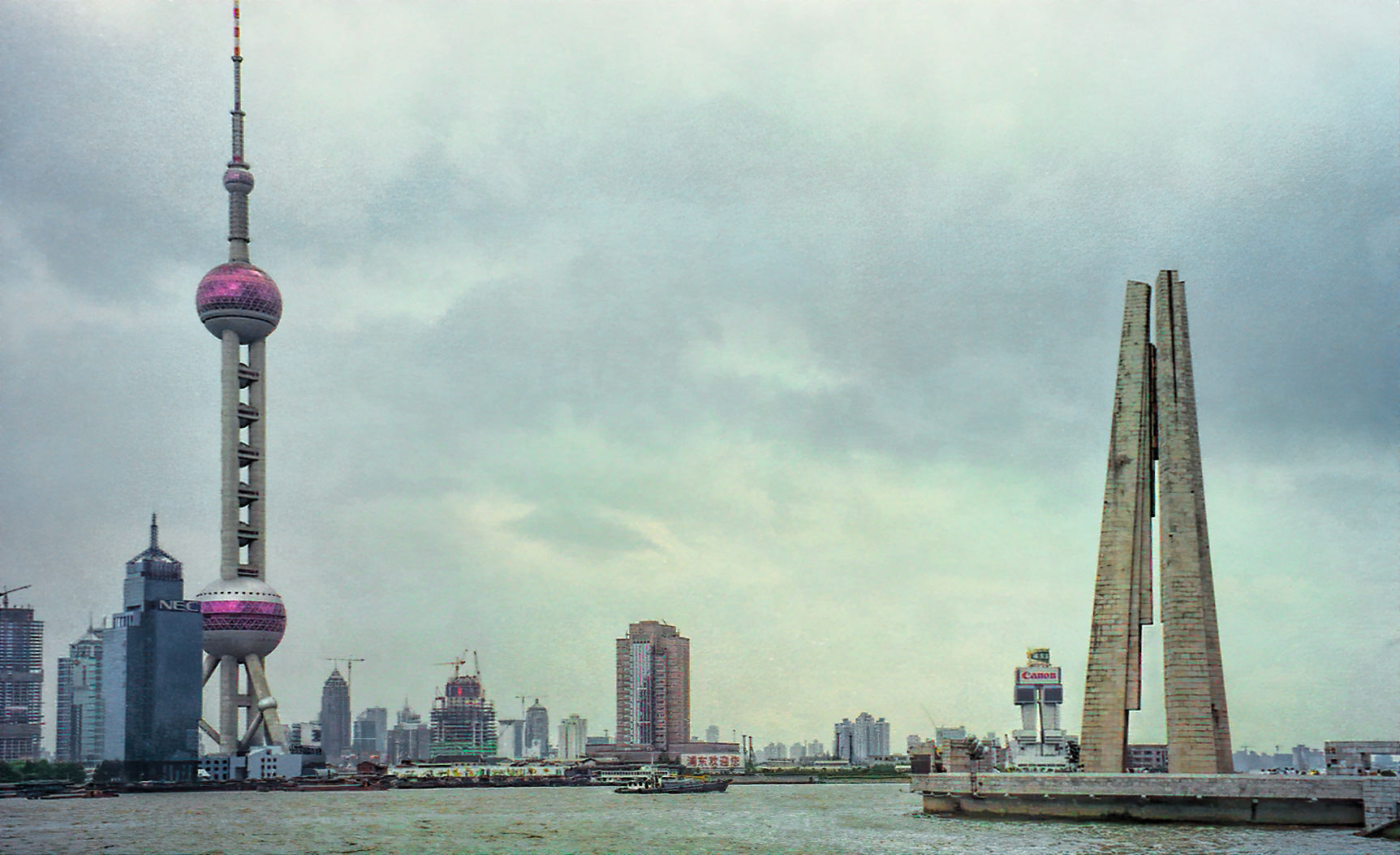
Shanghai, viewed from The Bund, the principal setting of the Zhong Fong series.

His novel Shanghai: The Ivory Compact (2008) spanned thousands of years. Rotenberg wrote it as three novels, but Penguin published it in one volume. It was reportedly optioned by Darius Films and by Jane McLean for television.

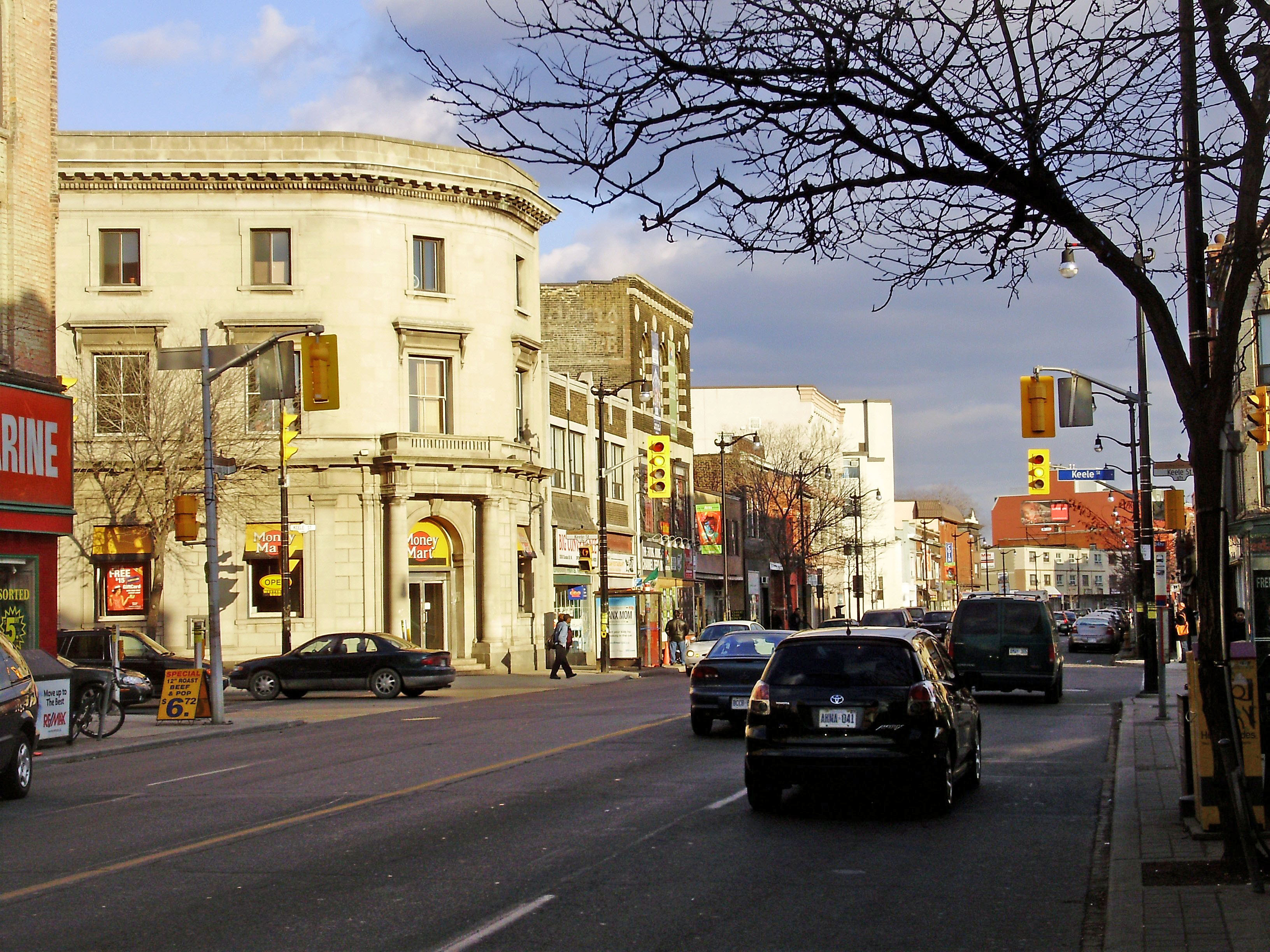
Dundas and Keele, The Junction, Toronto, initial and final setting of The Junction Chronicles.

His The Junction Chronicles series is set in Toronto's The Junction neighbourhood.

Robert J. Wiersema described The Placebo Effect (2012) as a thriller "possessed of an enthralling undercurrent" and praised Rotenberg's characterization but questioned the thriller's narrative and philosophical level. The trilogy was optioned by producer Don Kurt for television.

In 2017, he published the first book of his The Dream Chronicles series, followed by the second in 2019. In 2021, he published ACT - The Modern Actor’s Handbook.

==== Projects in development ====
In 2008, Rotenberg mentioned potential projects; a sixth Zhong Fong novel, a sequel to Shanghai, and a book about Canadian actors who studied with him.

==== Influences and writing process ====
Rotenberg cited influences including John Le Carré, Jack Miles, James Lee Burke, Thomas Cahill, Harlan Ellison, William Boyd, Annie Proulx, K.C. Constantine, James Crumley, playwright Robert Litz, and Aaron Sorkin. He described his writing process, noting the differences in his workspace for his different series.

==== Theory of novel authorship and sources of inspiration ====
Rotenberg considered the novel genre superior to others, emphasizing character over plot. His teaching and directing experience informed his writing, drawing inspiration from his student and incorporating elements from his career. He believed that Canadian crime writers had an advantage over their counterparts in other countries, focusing more on social and historical context.

== Personal life ==
Rotenberg lived in The Junction, Toronto with his wife Susan Santiago until his death in November 2023. They had two adult children, both dual citizens.

York University announced Rotenberg's death on November 14, 2023.

== Bibliography ==
=== Novels ===
Zhong Fong mysteries

- The Shanghai Murders (1998)
- The Lake Ching Murders (2001)
- The Hua Shan Hospital Murders (2003)
- The Hamlet Murders (2004)
- The Golden Mountain Murders (2005)

Shanghai (2008)

The Junction Chronicles

- The Placebo Effect (2012)
- A Murder of Crows (2013)
- The Glass House (2014)

The Dream Chronicles

- Book 1 (2017)
- Book 2 (2019)

=== Selected drama ===
Original screenplays and teleplays

- Ambition's Debt (optioned by Shaftesbury Films as writer/director)
- Gliders (commissioned by Sy Maloney and Associates; unproduced)
- YYZ (commissioned by Metaphore Productions; unproduced)
- Providence (commissioned by Berryman Production Group; unproduced)
- 8 episodes of Missing Treasures (Global)
- 6 episodes of Actor's Notes (Bravo!)

Stage adaptations

- Dwarf • based on The Dwarf, a novel by Pär Lagerkvist, York University and Equity Showcase
- Lady in the Lake • based on The Lady in the Lake a novel by Raymond Chandler, York University
- Lulu • based on a character in two plays by Frank Wedekind, Equity Showcase
- The Great Gatsby (2008) • based on The Great Gatsby by F. Scott Fitzgerald, Classical Theatre Project
