= The Good Son =

The Good Son may refer to:

== Film and television ==
- The Good Son (film), a 1993 American psychological thriller
- The Good Son (1998 film), a film featuring Peter Vaughan
- The Good Son: The Life of Ray "Boom Boom" Mancini, a 2013 documentary film
- The Good Son (TV series), a 2017–2018 Filipino family drama series
- "The Good Son" (Frasier), a 1993 TV episode
- "The Good Son" (NCIS), a 2012 TV episode
- "The Good Son" (That '70s Show), a 1999 TV episode

== Literature ==
- The Good Son (Nova novel), a 1982 novel by Craig Nova
- The Good Son (Jeong novel), a 2016 novel by You-Jeong Jeong
- The Good Son: JFK Jr. and the Mother He Loved, a 2014 book by Christopher Andersen

== Music ==
- The Good Son (album), a 1990 album by Nick Cave and the Bad Seeds
- The Good Son, a 2006 album by Spot

== See also ==
- The Good Son vs. The Only Daughter, a 2005 album by David Sylvian
- Good Sons, a 1996 novel by K. C. Constantine
