= The Man Who Liked Slow Tomatoes =

Crime novel by K. C. Constantine

- First edition
- Author: K. C. Constantine
- Language: English
- Publisher: David R. Godine
- Publication date: 1982
- Publication place: United States
- Media type: Print (hardback)
- Pages: 177
- ISBN: 0-87923-407-5
- OCLC: 7737675
- Preceded by: A Fix Like This
- Followed by: Always a Body To Trade

The Man Who Liked Slow Tomatoes is a crime novel by the American writer K. C. Constantine set in 1980s Rocksburg, a fictional, blue-collar, Rust Belt town in Western Pennsylvania, modeled on the author's hometown of McKees Rocks, Pennsylvania, adjacent to Pittsburgh.

Mario Balzic, the protagonist, is an atypical detective for the genre: he is a Serbo-Italian American cop, middle-aged, unpretentious, a family man, and someone who asks questions and uses more sense than force.

The novel opens at Muscotti's Bar, Balzic's refuge, as Jimmy Romanelli sells several baskets of tomatoes to Vinnie, the barkeep. It ends weeks later after a disappearance that sorely challenge the detective skills of Balzic.

It is the fifth book in the 17-volume Rocksburg series.
