= The Man Who Liked to Look at Himself =

Crime novel by K. C. Constantine

The Man Who Liked To Look at Himself
- First edition
- Author: K. C. Constantine
- Language: English
- Publisher: Saturday Review Press
- Publication date: 1973
- Publication place: United States
- Media type: Print (hardback)
- Pages: 156
- ISBN: 0-8415-0266-8
- OCLC: 746089
- Preceded by: The Rocksburg Railroad Murders
- Followed by: The Blank Page

The Man Who Liked To Look at Himself is a crime novel by the American writer K. C. Constantine. The novel is set in 1970s Rocksburg, a fictional blue-collar, Rust Belt town in Western Pennsylvania (modeled on the author's hometown of McKees Rocks, Pennsylvania, adjacent to Pittsburgh).

Mario Balzic is the protagonist, an atypical detective for the genre, a Serbo-Italian American cop, middle-aged, unpretentious, a family man who asks questions and uses more sense than force.

As the novel opens, Balzic and Lt. Harry Minyon of the state police are hunting pheasant at the Rocksburg Rod and Gun Club when, after Minyon's dog bites Balzic, the dog uncovers a piece of human bone that shows signs of having been hacked apart.

It is the second book in the 17-volume Rocksburg series.
