= Saving Room for Dessert =

Crime novel by K. C. Constantine

- First edition
- Author: K. C. Constantine
- Language: English
- Publisher: The Mysterious Press of Warner Books
- Publication date: 2002
- Publication place: United States
- Media type: Print (hardback)
- Pages: 294
- ISBN: 0-89296-763-3
- OCLC: 48958005
- Preceded by: Grievance

Saving Room for Dessert is a 2002 crime novel by the American writer K. C. Constantine. The novel is set in 1990s Rocksburg, a fictional, blue-collar, Rust Belt town in Western Pennsylvania, modeled on the author's hometown of McKees Rocks, Pennsylvania, adjacent to Pittsburgh.

Constantine's earlier novels followed the exploits of police chief Mario Balzic and detective Rugs Carlucci of the Rocksburg police department; this one departs from the pattern by shadowing three beat cops: William Rayford, Robert Canoza, and James Reseta.

It is the seventeenth book in the 17-volume Rocksburg series.
