= Brushback =

Brushback may refer to:

- Brushback pitch, a baseball pitch thrown high and inside, to force the batter away from the plate
- Brushback (novel), a 1998 crime novel by K. C. Constantine
