= Grievance (novel) =

Crime novel by K. C. Constantine

- First edition
- Author: K. C. Constantine
- Language: English
- Publisher: The Mysterious Press of Warner Books
- Publication date: 2000
- Publication place: United States
- Media type: Print (hardback)
- Pages: 279
- ISBN: 0-89296-648-3
- OCLC: 41951326
- Preceded by: Blood Mud
- Followed by: Saving Room for Dessert

Grievance is a crime novel by the American writer K. C. Constantine set in 1990s Rocksburg, a fictional, blue-collar, Rust Belt town in Western Pennsylvania, modeled on the author's hometown of McKees Rocks, Pennsylvania, adjacent to Pittsburgh.

Detective Sergeant Ruggiero "Rugs" Carlucci, the self-deprecating protégé of recently retired Mario Balzic, is the protagonist.

It tells the story of James Deford Lyon, philanthropist and CEO of one of Pittsburgh's greatest steel companies, who has been gunned down in his mansion by a sniper, and detective "Rugs" Carlucci is quickly besieged by the demands of media figures from Washington and New York and sifting through hundreds of suspects who've been downsized by Lyons. In a second plot, Rugs' mother has a violent outburst that leads her to a mental hospital; Rugs' partner is operating behind his back, hoping to nail the killer and gain a promotion; and his relationship with a one-time Miss Pennsylvania runner-up is coming to a critical crossroad.

It is the sixteenth book in the 17-volume Rocksburg series.
