= Cranks and Shadows =

Crime novel by K. C. Constantine

- First edition
- Author: K. C. Constantine
- Language: English
- Publisher: The Mysterious Press of Warner Books
- Publication date: 1995
- Publication place: United States
- Media type: Print (hardback)
- Pages: 314
- ISBN: 0-89296-543-6
- OCLC: 31131489
- Preceded by: Bottom Liner Blues
- Followed by: Good Sons

Cranks and Shadows is a 1995 crime novel by the American writer K. C. Constantine set in 1990s Rocksburg, a fictional, blue-collar, Rust Belt town in Western Pennsylvania, modeled on the author's hometown of McKees Rocks, Pennsylvania, adjacent to Pittsburgh.

Mario Balzic is the protagonist, an atypical detective for the genre, a Serbo-Italian American cop, middle-aged, unpretentious, a family man who asks questions and uses more sense than force.

The novel opens with Balzic being told to lay off five members of his police department. Balzic confronts members of the Conemaugh Foundation, a clandestine organization out to seize control of Rocksburg.

It is the eleventh book in the 17-volume Rocksburg series.
