= Bottom Liner Blues =

Crime novel by K. C. Constantine

- Author: K. C. Constantine
- Language: English
- Publisher: The Mysterious Press of Warner Books
- Publication date: 1993
- Publication place: United States
- Media type: Print (hardback)
- Pages: 167
- ISBN: 0-89296-289-5
- OCLC: 26722159
- Preceded by: Sunshine Enemies
- Followed by: Cranks and Shadows

Bottom Liner Blues is a crime novel by the American writer K. C. Constantine set in 1990s Rocksburg, a fictional, blue-collar, Rust Belt town in Western Pennsylvania, modeled on the author's hometown of McKees Rocks, Pennsylvania, adjacent to Pittsburgh.

Mario Balzic is the protagonist, an atypical detective for the genre, a Serbo-Italian American cop, middle-aged, unpretentious, a family man who asks questions and uses more sense than force.

The novel opens with Balzic back in a police car and feeling depressed about his mother's recent death. He gets a call from a woman who thinks her husband may be out to brutally exact revenge on a truck driver with a questionable past. She wants Balzic to stop the attack, but gives him little to go on. He senses there is more coming and he is right.

It is the tenth book in the 17-volume Rocksburg series.
