= Always a Body to Trade =

Crime novel by K. C. Constantine

Always a Body To Trade
- Author: K. C. Constantine
- Language: English
- Publisher: David R. Godine
- Publication date: 1983
- Publication place: United States
- Media type: Print (hardback)
- Pages: 248
- ISBN: 978-0-87923-458-4
- OCLC: 9111533
- Preceded by: The Man Who Liked Slow Tomatoes
- Followed by: Upon Some Midnights Clear

Always a Body To Trade is a crime novel by the American writer K. C. Constantine set in 1980s Rocksburg, a fictional, blue-collar, Rust Belt town in Western Pennsylvania, modeled on the author's hometown of McKees Rocks, Pennsylvania, adjacent to Pittsburgh.

== Plot ==
Mario Balzic is the protagonist, an atypical detective for the genre, a Serbo-Italian American cop, middle-aged, unpretentious, a family man who asks questions and uses more sense than force.

It is the sixth book in the 17-volume Rocksburg series.

== Reference list ==
Novel Page on Publisher's Website
