= A Fix Like This =

Crime novel by K. C. Constantine

- Original hardcover copy of A Fix Like This
- Author: K. C. Constantine
- Language: English
- Publisher: Saturday Review Press
- Publication date: 1975
- Publication place: United States
- Media type: Print (hardback)
- Pages: 185
- ISBN: 0-8415-0376-1
- OCLC: 1230771
- Preceded by: The Blank Page
- Followed by: The Man Who Liked Slow Tomatoes

A Fix Like This is a crime novel by the American writer K. C. Constantine set in 1970s Rocksburg, a fictional, blue-collar, Rust Belt town in Western Pennsylvania, modeled on the author's hometown of McKees Rocks, Pennsylvania, adjacent to Pittsburgh.

Mario Balzic is the protagonist, an atypical detective for the genre, a Serbo-Italian American cop, middle-aged, unpretentious, a family man who asks questions and uses more sense than force.

As the novel opens, Armand "Fat Manny" Manditti has been stabbed and is brought into the emergency room by his brother Tullio the Tub, who refuses to tell Chief Balzic what happened. Balzic suspects the men will take revenge, and he works to prevent the death of a citizen or two of Rocksburg.

It is the fourth book in the 17-volume Rocksburg series.
