= Family values (disambiguation) =

Family values are a political and social concept.

Family values may also refer to:

== Literature ==
- Family Values, a novel by Abha Dawesar
- Family Values (novel), a crime novel by K. C. Constantine
- Family Values (comics), a 1997 graphic novel in Frank Miller's Sin City series
- Family Values (play), a 2020 Australian play by David Williamson

== Film and TV ==
- "Family Values" (The Outer Limits), an episode of The Outer Limits television series
- "Family Values" (Law & Order: Criminal Intent), an episode of the television series Law & Order: Criminal Intent from season 8
- "Family Values" (2 Stupid Dogs), an episode of 2 Stupid Dogs

== Music ==
- Family Values (album), a 2015 studio album by South African rapper and producer Riky Rick
- Family Values Tour, a rock and hip-hop music tour and festival started in 1998
- Family Values, a Dallas-based punk band from 1990 to 1998; see Faris McReynolds
