= Upon Some Midnights Clear =

Crime novel by K. C. Constantine

- First edition
- Author: K. C. Constantine
- Language: English
- Publisher: David R. Godine
- Publication date: 1985
- Publication place: United States
- Media type: Print (hardback)
- Pages: 248
- ISBN: 0-87923-570-5
- OCLC: 11785388
- Preceded by: Always a Body To Trade
- Followed by: Joey's Case

Upon Some Midnights Clear is a crime novel by the American writer K. C. Constantine set in 1980s Rocksburg, a fictional, blue-collar, Rust Belt town in Western Pennsylvania, modeled on the author's hometown of McKees Rocks, Pennsylvania, adjacent to Pittsburgh.

Mario Balzic is the protagonist, an atypical detective for the genre, a Serbo-Italian American cop, middle-aged, unpretentious, a family man who asks questions and uses more sense than force.

The novel opens during the yuletide season with Ed Sitko, the chief of the city's volunteer firefighters, telling Balzic about Mrs. Gabin, who was mugged of Christmas money. Before Balzic can investigate, Sitko has firefighters out collecting money for the victim. But the more Balzic looks into the incident, the less he likes it.

It is the seventh book in the 17-volume Rocksburg series.
