= Sunshine Enemies =

Crime novel by K. C. Constantine

- First edition
- Author: K. C. Constantine
- Language: English
- Publisher: The Mysterious Press of Warner Books
- Publication date: 1990
- Publication place: United States
- Media type: Print (hardback)
- Pages: 167
- ISBN: 0-89296-288-7
- OCLC: 20319437
- Preceded by: Joey's Case
- Followed by: Bottom Liner Blues

Sunshine Enemies is a crime novel by the American writer K. C. Constantine set in 1980s Rocksburg, a fictional, blue-collar, Rust Belt town in Western Pennsylvania, modeled on the author's hometown of McKees Rocks, Pennsylvania, adjacent to Pittsburgh.

Mario Balzic is the protagonist, an atypical detective for the genre, a Serbo-Italian American cop, middle-aged, unpretentious, a family man who asks questions and uses more sense than force.

The novel opens with a Lutheran minister complaining about a pornography ship that recently opened at the edge of town. Next a brutal knife murder happens in the shop's parking lot. All of this prompts Balzic the police chief to work the case, digging up reluctant witnesses and asking questions.

It is the ninth book in the 17-volume Mario Balzic Detective Mystery Series.
