= The Rocksburg Railroad Murders =

Crime novel by K. C. Constantine

- First edition
- Author: K. C. Constantine
- Language: English
- Publisher: Saturday Review Press
- Publication date: 1972
- Publication place: United States
- Media type: Print (hardback)
- Pages: 306
- ISBN: 0-8415-0180-7
- OCLC: 589010
- Followed by: The Man Who Liked To Look at Himself

The Rocksburg Railroad Murders is a crime novel by the American writer K. C. Constantine. The book is the first in the 17-volume Rocksburg series, which introduces Mario Balzic as a detective working to solve crimes in Rocksburg, a fictional blue-collar Rust Belt town in Western Pennsylvania, modeled on the author's hometown of McKees Rocks, Pennsylvania.

== Plot summary ==
The novel opens with John Andrasko being found dead on a station platform late at night in Rocksburg. Andrasko was on his way to work at a local steel plant when someone beat him to death with a Coke bottle, so bad that he could only be identified by his wallet. Mario Balzic, the local Chief of Police, had known Andrasko all his life. Balzic starts an investigation into his death and is soon convinced he knows who the murderer is, but persuading the local district attorney and state troopers in the absence of any concrete evidence and the context of local rivalries is another matter. Which is a cause of major anxiety as Balzic is certain that if he's not apprehended he'll kill again.
