= Blood Mud =

Crime novel by K. C. Constantine

- Author: K. C. Constantine
- Language: English
- Publisher: The Mysterious Press of Warner Books
- Publication date: 1999
- Publication place: United States
- Media type: Print (hardback)
- Pages: 375
- ISBN: 0-89296-647-5
- OCLC: 39458968
- Preceded by: Brushback
- Followed by: Grievance

Blood Mud is a crime novel by the American writer K. C. Constantine set in 1990s Rocksburg, a fictional, blue-collar, Rust Belt town in Western Pennsylvania, modeled on the author's hometown of McKees Rocks, Pennsylvania, adjacent to Pittsburgh.

Mario Balzic is the protagonist, an atypical detective for the genre, a Serbo-Italian American cop, unpretentious, a family man who asks questions and uses more sense than force.

The novel opens with Balzic again being lured out of his retirement with an offer: track down the missing guns from a local gun shop for an insurance company.

It is the fifteenth book in the 17-volume Rocksburg series.

== Reception ==
A review by January Magazine calls the Blood Mud "Constantine's best yet," praising the complex story and rich dialogue. Publishers Weekly comments on the "pitch-perfect dialogue", describing it as "beautifully developed and enigmatically resolved."
