= The Blank Page =

Crime novel by K. C. Constantine

- First edition
- Author: K. C. Constantine
- Language: English
- Publisher: Saturday Review Press
- Publication date: 1974
- Publication place: United States
- Media type: Print (hardback)
- Pages: 150
- ISBN: 0-8415-0335-4
- OCLC: 835377
- Preceded by: The Man Who Liked To Look at Himself
- Followed by: A Fix Like This

The Blank Page is a crime novel by the American writer K. C. Constantine set in 1970s Rocksburg, a fictional, blue-collar, Rust Belt town in Western Pennsylvania (modeled on the author's hometown of McKees Rocks, Pennsylvania, adjacent to Pittsburgh).

== Plot ==
Mario Balzic is the protagonist, an atypical detective for the genre, a Serbo-Italian American cop, middle-aged, unpretentious, a family man who asks questions and uses more sense than force.

As the novel opens, it is a record-hot Memorial Day when Miss Cynthia Summer calls Police Chief Mario Balzic to say that she hadn't seen one of her student roomers. Balzic discovers Janet Pisula's body on the floor of her room, a blank sheet of typing paper on her stomach.

It is the third book in the 17-volume Rocksburg series.
