= Robert Rotenberg =

Canadian criminal defence lawyer and writer

- Born: April 21, 1953 (age 72); Toronto, Ontario, Canada
- Occupations: Lawyer; novelist
- Children: 3
- Parents: Dr. Cyril Rotenberg; Gertrude Rotenberg
- Relatives: Lawrence; David; Matthew (brothers)
- Website: robertrotenberg.com

Robert Rotenberg (born April 21, 1953) is a Canadian criminal defence lawyer and writer, based in Toronto. He has worked as a criminal defence lawyer from the 1990s. As of March 1, 2024, he practices as part of the association of Rotenberg Shidlowski Jesin. Rotenberg's first novel, Old City Hall is an international best-seller. He has written seven additional novels.

== Early life and education ==
Robert Rotenberg was born and raised in Toronto, with three brothers (Lawrence, David, and Matthew) sons of Jewish parents Dr. Cyril Rotenberg, a physician, and his mother Gertrude Ruth (Gertie) Rotenberg, described as a "woman of initiative, of new ideas and steady values." Rotenberg studied at the University of Toronto, Osgoode Hall and the London School of Economics.

Older brother David Rotenberg also attended the University of Toronto and graduated with a Bachelor of Arts. He left Toronto in 1971, eventually making a name for himself first as a theatre director in the United States, and, after he returned to Toronto in 1987, he was a well respected acting teacher and best-selling novelist.

== Career ==
While in Europe in the early 1980s, he was the managing editor of English-language magazine Passion, The Magazine of Paris. When he returned to Canada, he and a partner founded and published T.O. The Magazine of Toronto, which ran for six years and folded in 1988 . He also worked for a year as a radio producer at CBC Radio.

He and associates Alvin Shidlowski and Jacob Jesin have had a criminal law practice in Toronto since the early 1990s Rotenberg, Shidlowski, Jesin, defending, as Rotenberg describes it, "everything from murder to shoplifting." Cases attracting particular attention have included the defence in 2007 of an Ontario College of Art and Design student who planted a fake bomb and posted a YouTube video about it as part of an art project, which in turn prompted an evacuation during a gala fundraiser at the Royal Ontario Museum. Rotenberg continues to actively practice law while focusing on his writing career, saying he plans to write 20 legal thrillers set in Toronto.

== Writing ==
Rotenberg's first novel, Old City Hall, is set in Toronto. The novel features scenes in the city's historic Old City Hall, until recently used as a courthouse. The book was published in February–March 2009 in North America and the United Kingdom, and audio and translated international versions have been published in France, Germany, Italy, Spain, Russia, Poland, India, Japan and Israel. Critical reviews of the novel were mixed to positive.

Since then, he has published The Guilty Plea in 2011, Stray Bullets in 2012 and Stranglehold in 2013, "Heart of the City" in 2018, "Downfall" in 2021 and "What We Buried" in 2024 . All of his books have been on the Globe & Mail bestseller. The 2011 publication was a finalist for the British Crime Writers' Association New Blood Dagger Award. All Rotenberg's books are set in Toronto, and feature the same ensemble cast. A 2021 book, Downfall, has the male protagonist, Ari Greene, promoted to head of homicide squad of the Toronto Police Force. his seventh novel, "What We Buried" published February 2024. His eighth novel, "One Minute More," was published in February 2025. It is a prequel set in July 1988 when the world leaders, the G-7, met at Hart House at the University of Toronto. It features a young Ari Greene, chasing a would-be assassin on her way from the Quebec border to Toronto.

In 2013, NPR broadcast a feature story about Rotenberg and Toronto for their Crime in the City series, describing how he developed his characters by giving them actual locations in Toronto to live.

Rotenberg also teaches writing to aspiring novelist, does writing seminars at various law firms in Toronto as well as lecturing at an LLM program at Osgoode Hall Law School. He has participated in The Word on the Street, Authors at Harbourfront Centre, Toronto and the Ottawa International Writers Festival, Thrillerfest in New York City, among other literary events.

He has written for two episodes for Murdoch Mysteries, "Murdoch Schmurdoch" (2018) and "Manual for Murder" (2019).

== Personal life ==
Rotenberg lives and works in Toronto.
