= Brushback (novel) =

Crime novel by K. C. Constantine

- First edition
- Author: K. C. Constantine
- Language: English
- Publisher: The Mysterious Press of Warner Books
- Publication date: 1998
- Publication place: United States
- Media type: Print (hardback)
- Pages: 278
- ISBN: 0-89296-646-7
- OCLC: 36499106
- Preceded by: Family Values
- Followed by: Blood Mud

Brushback is a crime novel by the American writer K. C. Constantine, first published by The Mysterious Press in 1998. The novel isset in 1990s Rocksburg, a fictional, blue-collar, Rust Belt town in Western Pennsylvania, modeled on the author's hometown of McKees Rocks, Pennsylvania, adjacent to Pittsburgh.

Detective Sergeant Ruggiero "Rugs" Carlucci, the self-deprecating protégé of recently retired Mario Balzic, is the protagonist.

It tells the story of Carlucci, now acting chief of the Rocksburg, Police Department. When a former professional baseball player is beaten to death, Carlucci delves into the past of the athlete and finds that the bases are loaded with suspects.

It is the fourteenth book in the 17-volume Rocksburg series.
