= Joey's Case =

Crime novel by K. C. Constantine

- First edition
- Author: K. C. Constantine
- Language: English
- Publisher: The Mysterious Press of Warner Books
- Publication date: 1988
- Publication place: United States
- Media type: Print (hardback)
- Pages: 224
- ISBN: 0-89296-347-6
- OCLC: 16406152
- Preceded by: Upon Some Midnights Clear
- Followed by: Sunshine Enemies

Joey's Case is a crime novel by the American writer K. C. Constantine set in 1980s Rocksburg, a fictional, blue-collar, Rust Belt town in Western Pennsylvania, modeled on the author's hometown of McKees Rocks, Pennsylvania, adjacent to Pittsburgh.

== Plot ==
Mario Balzic is the protagonist, an atypical detective for the genre, a Serbo-Italian American cop, middle-aged, unpretentious, a family man who asks questions and uses more sense than force.

The novel opens with a former coal miner, Albert Castelucci, asking Balzic to investigate the killing of his son. He feels the state police in charge of the case have botched the investigation, but when Balzic begins, he finds more puzzles than he first expected.

== Publishing details and honors ==
It is the eighth book in the seventeen-volume Rocksburg series and was nominated for the Edgar Allan Poe Award for Best Novel in 1989.

== Reception ==
Richard Dyer of The Boston Globe opined that the novel is "frustrating only because it tells it like it is", considering it the best entry in the series. Richard Fuller of The Philadelphia Inquirer wrote that Constantine is "every bit the equal of Leonard and McBain in the dialogue department" and considered his characterisation to be slightly superior.
