= Family Values (novel) =

Crime novel by K. C. Constantine

- Author: K. C. Constantine
- Language: English
- Publisher: The Mysterious Press of Warner Books
- Publication date: 1997
- Publication place: United States
- Media type: Print (hardback)
- Pages: 216
- ISBN: 0-89296-545-2
- OCLC: 34772318
- Preceded by: Good Sons
- Followed by: Brushback

Family Values is a crime novel by the American writer K. C. Constantine set in 1990s Rocksburg, a fictional, blue-collar, Rust Belt town in Western Pennsylvania, modeled on the author's hometown of McKees Rocks, Pennsylvania, adjacent to Pittsburgh.

Mario Balzic is the protagonist, an atypical detective for the genre, a Serbo-Italian American cop, unpretentious, a family man who asks questions and uses more sense than force.

The novel opens with Balzic being lured out of his retirement with an offer: investigate a 17-year-old murder that just gets stranger as time passes in exchange for the title of Special Investigator, state credentials, and thirty-five dollars an hour.

It is the thirteenth book in the 17-volume Rocksburg series.
