= Zhong Fong (novel series) =

Book series by David Rotenberg

- The Shanghai Murders (1998); The Lake Ching Murders (2001); The Hua Shan Hospital Murders (2003); The Hamlet Murders (2004); The Golden Mountain Murders (2005)
- Author: David Rotenberg
- Country: Canada
- Language: English
- Genre: Detective fiction Thriller
- Publisher: McArthur & Company
- Published: 1998–2005
- Media type: Print

The Zhong Fong mystery series is a quintet of Canadian novels by theatre director and acting coach David Rotenberg, set primarily in contemporary Shanghai, China, and named after the series protagonist, Detective Inspector Zhong Fong. In addition to The Shanghai Murders (1998) and its four sequels, the character also makes a cameo appearance in Rotenberg's epic historical novel, Shanghai. The series and Shanghai have both received critical acclaim and sold well worldwide.

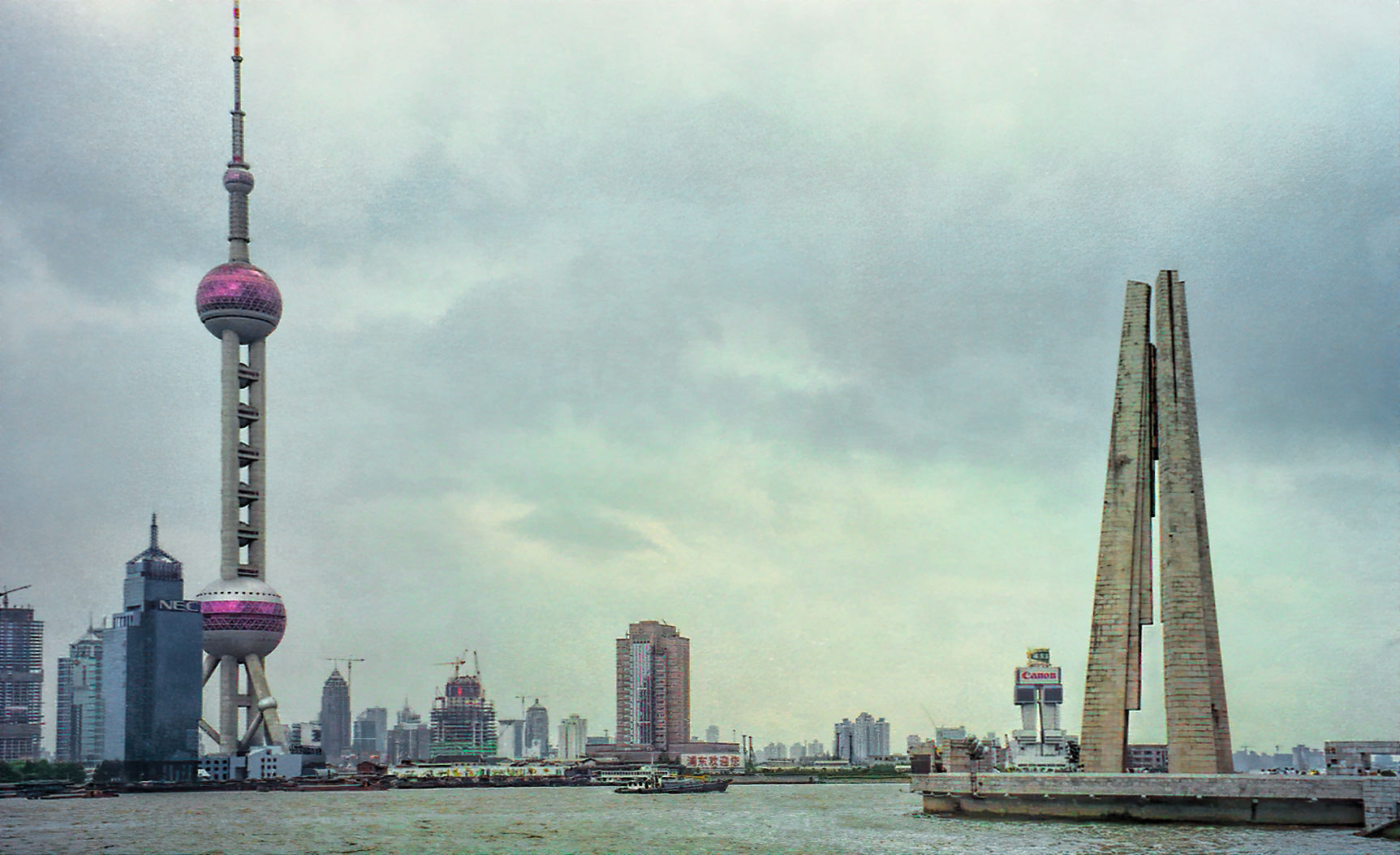
View of Shanghai from The Bund, featuring the Monument to the People's Heroes erected in 1993 (right) and the Oriental Pearl TV Tower, completed in 1994 (left), then the tallest building in China.

== Synopsis ==
=== The Shanghai Murders: A Mystery of Love and Ivory ===
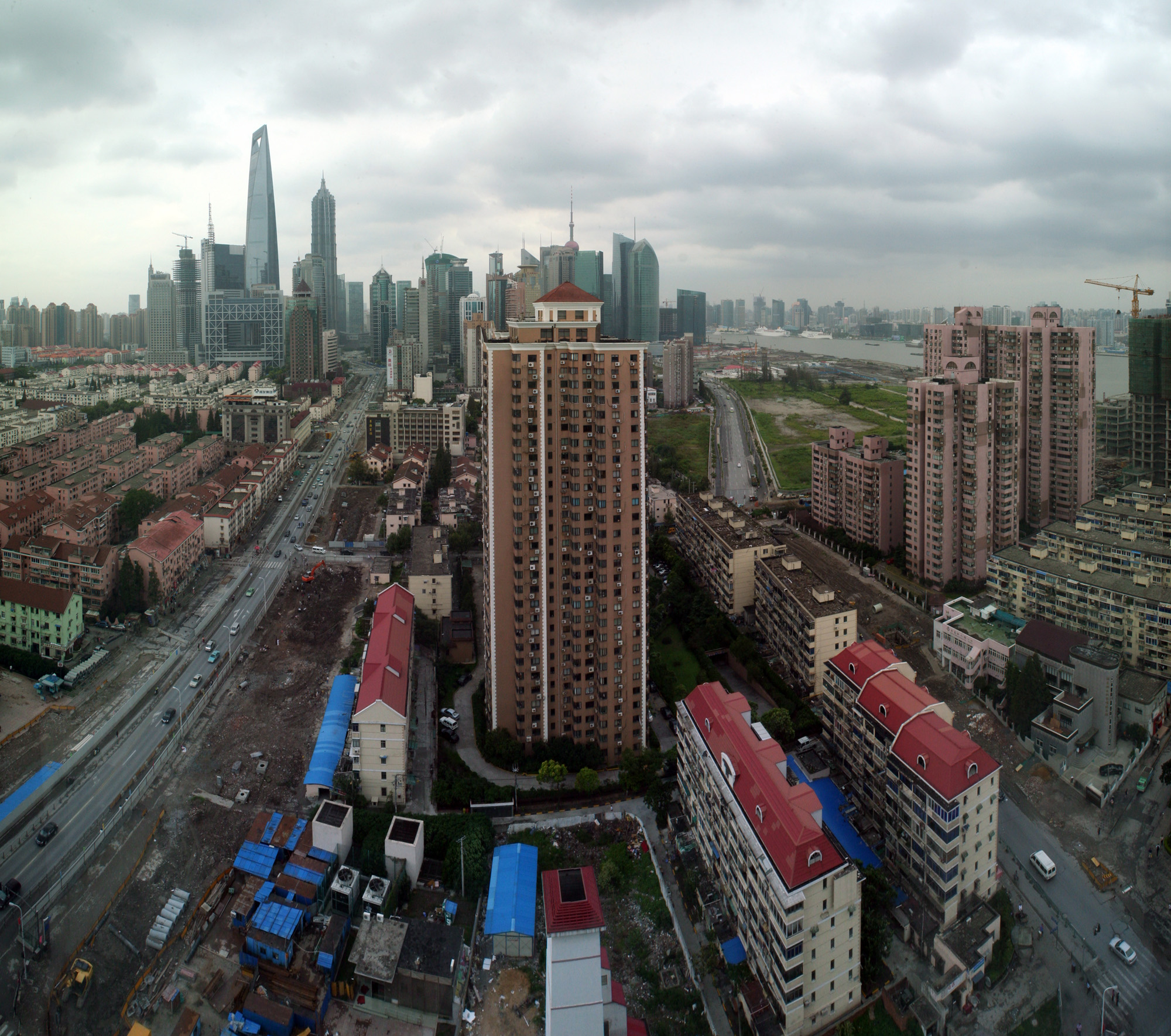
Panoramic view of the Pudong, Shanghai

In or around 1993, (Note: The Golden Mountain Murders takes place between the events of September 11, 2001 and the 2003 Iraq War, in or around 2002, while the events of The Shanghai Murders take place nine years earlier (in or around 1993).) Zhong Fong is the forty-four-year-old Head of Special Investigations for the District of Shanghai, and a widower. His investigation of brutal murders by the so-called Dim Sum Killer leads to a new inquiry into the death of his wife, in which the detective is himself implicated, causing emotional turmoil, exacerbated by the recent return to Shanghai of her lover, Canadian stage director Geoffrey Hyland. With help from the widow of one of the victims, the detective draws out the killer, but "police bosses resist his solution." The chase ultimately leads to a confrontation in a construction pit in the Pudong, and a fight to the death with a master assassin. Now officially blamed for the death of his wife, Zhong is a "convicted killer" and a "traitor" condemned to two and a half years in prison and then exile "beyond the Wall" to a remote and impoverished village in northwestern China near the Mongolian border.

=== The Lake Ching Murders: A Mystery of Fire and Ice ===
Two years into his incommunicado exile, Zhong Fong receives a warning telegram from his friend Lily in Shanghai, and two Party men throw him into the trunk of a car. They drive south for two days to Xi'an, the ultimate destination Lake Ching, a large fresh water lake two hours west of Xi'an, where the authorities have a special assignment for him that "no one else wants" but which piques his own interest, partly because it may help restore his former status: the massacre of a boat-full of seventeen foreign scientists and businessmen months earlier and the more recent disappearance of the original investigator assigned to the case. As Zhong and his small team work through the case, he is drawn once again into Party politics.

=== The Hua Shan Hospital Murders: A Zhong Fong Mystery ===
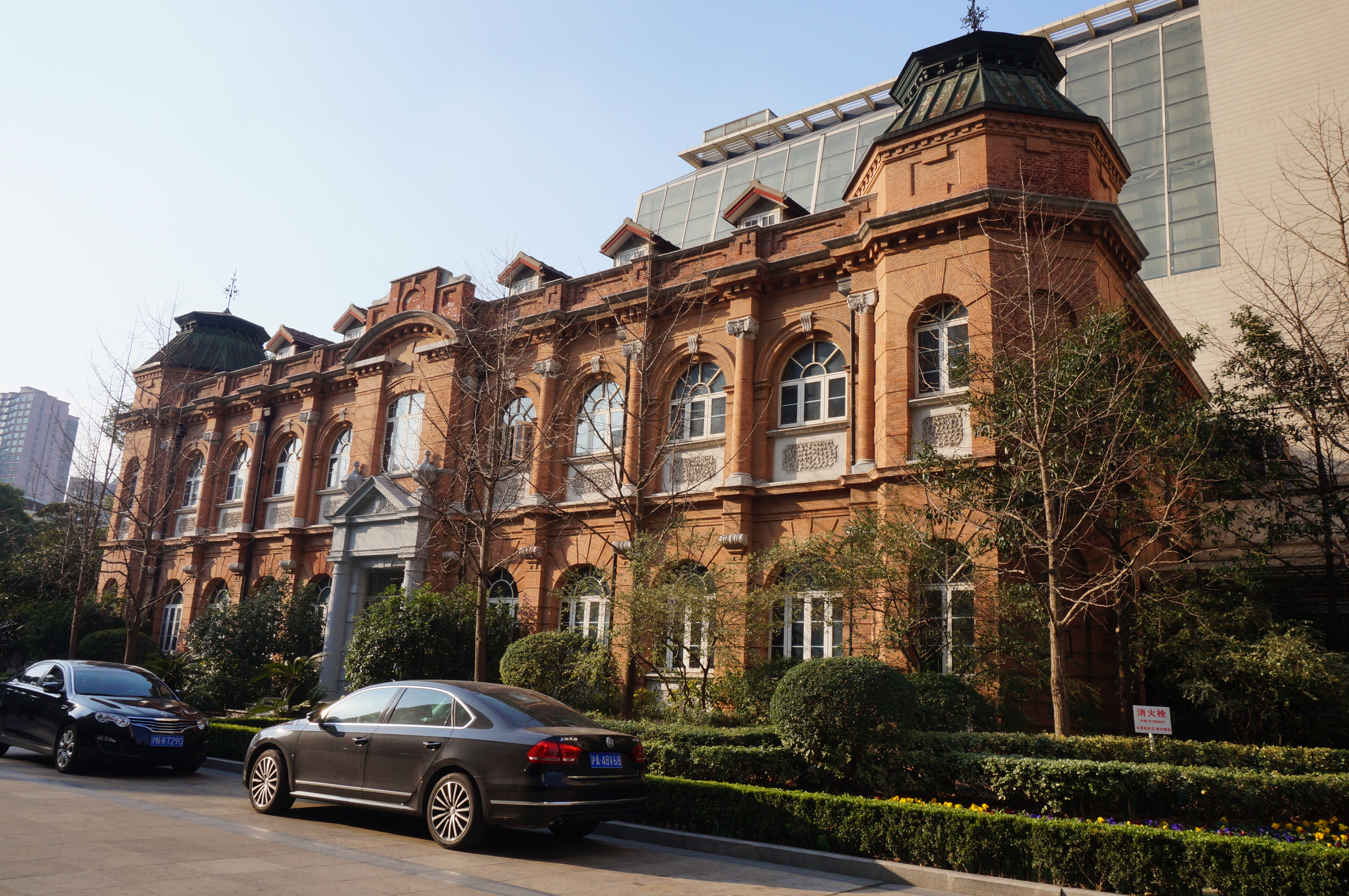
Huashan Hospital, Shanghai

Zhong Fong has been reinstated as head of Shanghai District's Special Investigations unit, is recently married, and has a baby girl, Xiao Ming. Two abortion clinics are bombed, one in Huashan Hospital, with notes found in English suggesting the bomber is motivated by religion. Zhong enlists the aid of Robert Owens, a lawyer turned antique smuggler searching for his orphaned sister.

=== The Hamlet Murders: A Zhong Fong Mystery ===
Zhong Fong finds himself involved once more with the theatre world when Geoffrey Hyland is found hanged in an apparent suicide, though the detective thinks otherwise, and that finding the killer may lead him to "a new knowledge of himself." Because of Hyland's love affair with his wife, the detective is once again a murder suspect. Meanwhile, Zhong's inexpensive apartment is turned into a "very expensive condo."

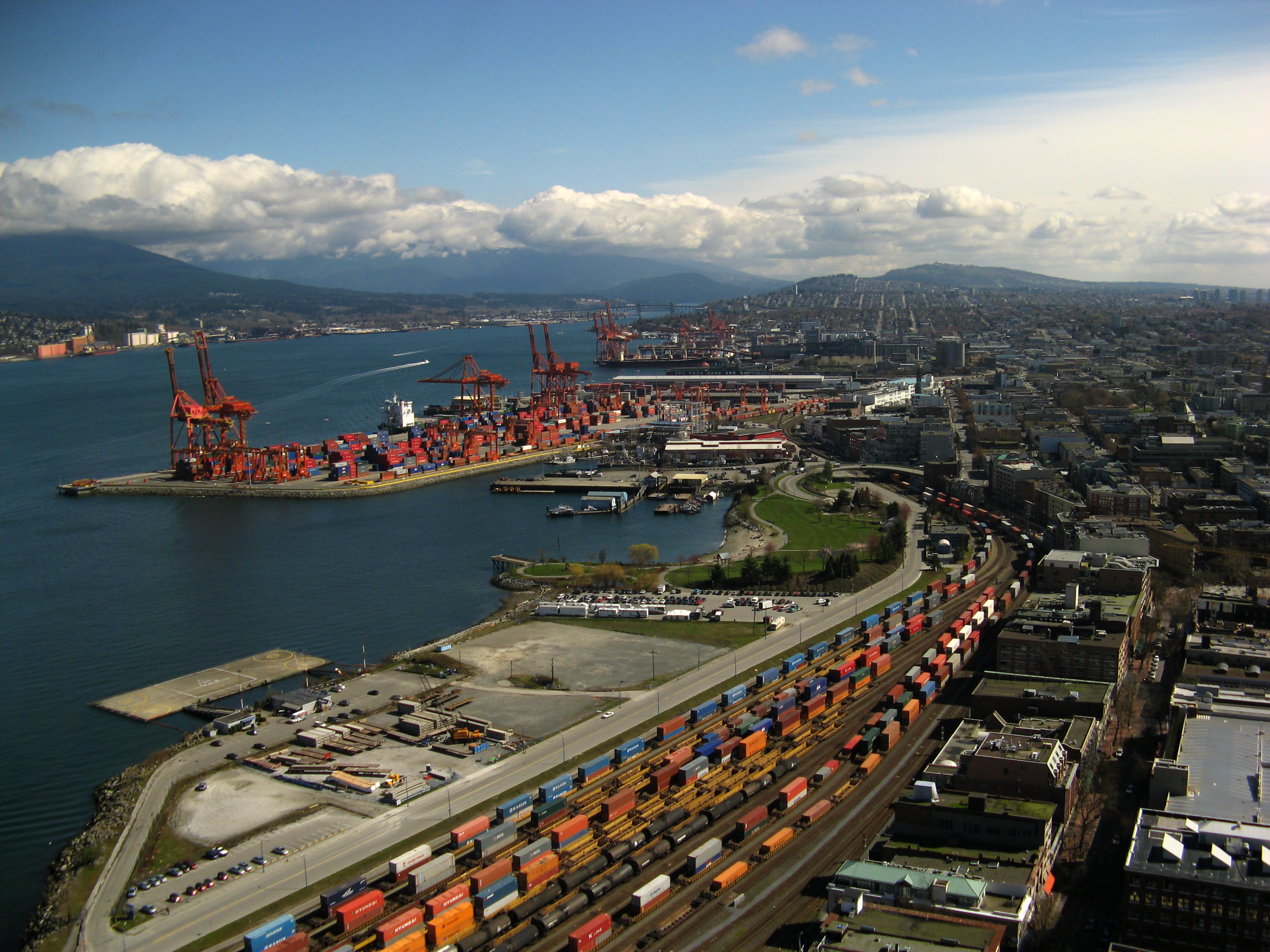
Aerial view of the Port of Vancouver

=== The Golden Mountain Murders: A Zhong Fong Mystery ===
In or around 2002 (between 9/11 and the following Iraq War), the Office of Special Investigations is considered a model of modern Chinese efficiency. Zhong Fong follows a disturbing lead to rural Anhui, where he is shocked to confirm the anonymous informant's claim of blood trafficking and a "massive" outbreak of AIDS, the further investigation of which leads him to take the longest journey of his life, to Vancouver, Canada - "the Golden Mountain." Meanwhile, he is being watched by the Master of the Guild of Assassins, who is intent on avenging the Dim Sim Killer, who died at the detective's hands nine years earlier. Another Canadian director and drama teacher appears, Hyland's teacher: Charles Roeg, who serves as a human "lie detector".

== Setting and characters ==
Rotenberg's Shanghai is a "most unconventional setting" for the mystery genre, a city of many millions of people "making the tricky transition to capitalism." The city as presented in The Shanghai Murders has been described by reviewers as "exactingly accurate", "taking readers right into the urban heart of Shanghai," as Margaret Cannon puts it, with "conflicts between tradition and modernization."

As for the wider People's Republic of China, it has been described as a "character in and of itself". Catherine Thompson says Rotenberg "seems to have a great understanding of the people, their culture, politics and psychology.".

=== Zhong Fong ===
Readers describe series protagonist Zhong Fong as "smart", "compelling and sympathetic". Hyacinthe Miller calls Zhong a "complex, thoughtful character". By contrast, Donna Lypchuk calls Zhong an "unlikable curmudgeon" and a "self-absorbed cold fish".

As the character's backstory is established, it is revealed that Zhong Fong grew up in "the slums of Shanghai." In a related novel not published as part of the series (see below), Rotenberg offered readers a glimpse of Zhong's childhood, in which the four-year-old Zhong lives amid death and destruction shortly after the Chinese Communist Revolution.

Zhong was married to Fu Tsong, an actress who performed in a Shanghai theatre, where they lived in an apartment in the building. Throughout the series, Zhong often relies on what he learned from observing her rehearsals, including those for a production of Twelfth Night in which she played Olivia, and had an affair with her director, Geoffrey Hyland. Despite her infidelity, Zhong is haunted by the "singularly brutal" untimely death of his wife and their unborn child. Between the second and third novels, he marries his long time colleague Lily, who bears him a daughter, Xiao Ming.

The protagonist is named obliquely after Rotenberg's translator from his own time in Shanghai, Zhang Feng, whom he calls "the original Zhong Fong" in the acknowledgements to The Shanghai Murders.

=== People in the theatre ===
==== Fu Tsong ====
An actress who performed in the Grand Theatre who was married to Zhong Fong until her death four years prior to the start of the series. She figures prominently in Zhong Fong's memory throughout the series. She had an affair with her director Geoffrey Hyland.

==== Geoffrey Hyland ====
Geoffrey Hyland in two of the five Shanghai mysteries has come to Shanghai to direct a production of Twelfth Night (I've directed it twice myself)...

— David Rotenberg

A Canadian theatre director who had an affair with Zhong's late wife Fu Tsong. He is murdered in his second appearance in the series, but referenced occasionally later, as Zhong recalls what he learned watching his rehearsals with Fu Tsong.

Richard Adler remarks that Geoffrey Hyland bears "more than a few similarities" to Rotenberg himself. Michael Handelzalts goes so far as to call him the author's alter ego. Rotenberg freely admits to having "integrated" knowledge of acting teaching into his novels through the character.

On killing the character off, Rotenberg said: "it was more fun than I thought it would be (although the actual Geoffrey Hyland, a former student of mine who is a famous director in South Africa, was disappointed)."

==== Charles Roeg ====
Another Canadian theatre director who appears in the fifth novel of the series. He was Geoffrey Hyland's teacher, despite being younger than Hyland. He is also able to tell whether someone is lying and uses this talent to make money.

== Publication history ==
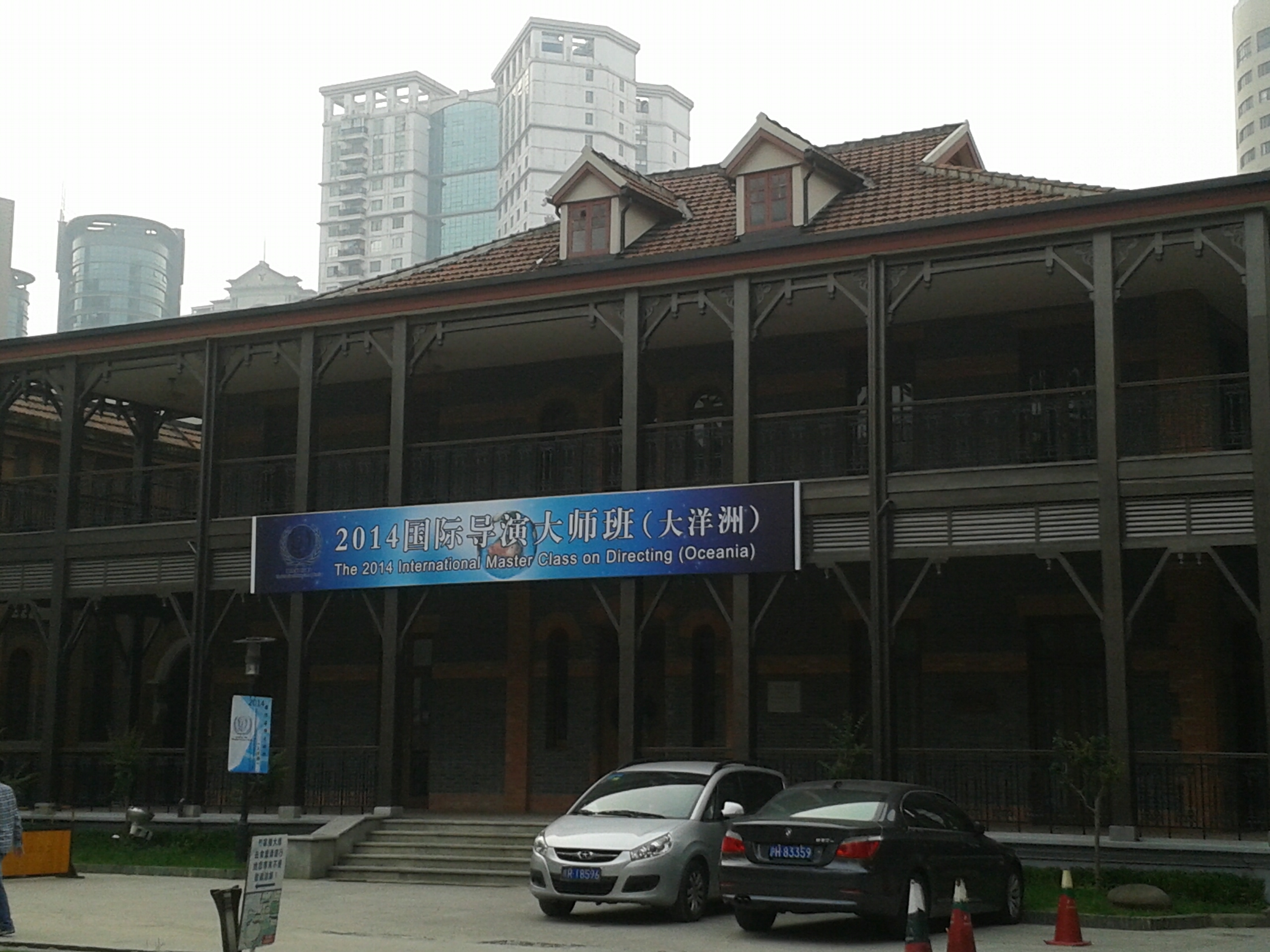
Shanghai Theatre Academy

=== Background ===
In 1994, David Rotenberg was invited to direct the first Canadian play to be staged in the People's Republic of China. Rotenberg mounted a production of The Ecstasy of Rita Joe in Mandarin at the Shanghai Theatre Academy at a time when China was going through a "massive transition from a profoundly oppressive socialist state to a basically free market economy – a thrilling time". (Note: Sources vary greatly on how long Rotenberg spent in China, and are unclear about whether he remained after the production was over, variously quoting ten, thirteen, or seventeen weeks.) Rotenberg had six weeks until rehearsals began, and used this time to explore the city with his translator: "Instead of visiting all the usual tourist sites, he went into all the small, dark alleys and chalked up impressions." Rotenberg recalled: "Here was a city that was actively involved in moving from being ignored by the great powers in Beijing to becoming the centre of Asian capitalism... You could feel it all around you. Some of my actors would leave rehearsals because they were setting up kiosks to sell produce on the street." The experience led to him beginning what became his second career, writing novels.

=== Writing process and series publication ===
As the Zhong Fong novels are police procedurals, Rotenberg purposefully had his writing space cluttered with images and books when he wrote it: "two large modern desks at right angles to each other — the whole thing dominated by a large computer monitor. It felt that the job was to produce order from the chaos — just as police officers must."

Zhong Fong first appeared in The Shanghai Murders, published in 1998 by the recently founded McArthur & Company. The next novels in the series were also published by McArthur & Co., in 2001, 2003, 2004, and 2005.

Map of Shanghai, 1884

=== Relationship to Shanghai ===
Just before The Golden Mountain Murders was published in 2005, Rotenberg received a lunch invitation from Penguin Canada publisher David Davidar and assumed that they would be discussing a sixth Zhong Fong novel, but Davidar had other ideas. "He wanted to know if I could do for Shanghai what James Clavell did for Hong Kong. It gave me pause because I love Clavell's writing." Davidar said he had "long admired" how well the novels were written, and how they convey a "sense of place". Shanghai: The Ivory Compact (2008) is an epic novel spanning centuries. Sarah Weinman describes the scope and inspiration for the work:

Shanghai is jam-packed with story and adventure, tracing a line from a narwhal tusk carved with possible prophecies in 207 BCE to how the city of Shanghai transformed itself in the mid-1800s in light of the Opium Wars and the arrival of Western immigrants looking for great fortunes. The kernel for this mammoth timeline was Rotenberg's chance discovery of a children's book that mentioned Silas Hordoon, an Iraqi Jew who arrived in Shanghai and soon scandalized the city, first by marrying his Chinese mistress, and then when they adopted almost 40 area orphans.

Though Shanghai is not part of the Zhong Fong series, the character nevertheless makes a cameo appearance towards the end of the novel as a four-year-old.

In 2008, Rotenberg talked about the possibility of a sixth Zhong Fong novel and a sequel to Shanghai set in post-Second World War Shanghai, contingent on a return visit to the city for more research. However, when Rotenberg was approached by Simon & Schuster "to write something other than about China", after what amounted to "eight novels about and around China" (Rotenberg counting Shanghai as three novels), he was "ready for a change", prompting the writing of the Toronto-set Junction Chronicles series. Jurgen Gothe reported in November 2009 that while part of a sixth novel "was in the works", Rotenberg had "moved on", and he concluded that there would be no more in the series.

Irresistibly exotic, this dark thriller pits love and justice against sinister agendas in fast-changing Shanghai... While the murders seem somewhat implausible, people and place, not plot, are the strengths in this debut.

— Publishers Weekly

== Reception ==
The fourth in the excellent series featuring Shanghai Detective Zhong Fong ... [is] every bit as good as the previous three. Rotenberg has a real talent for characterization and place... Rotenberg is an acting teacher; he knows a lot of the backstage lore of theatre, and brings it to bear fruitfully on the plot.

— Margaret Cannon

=== Commercial performance and critical response ===
The mystery series has been both a critical and commercial success. Zhong himself has "legions of fans around the world" according to Stephen Patrick Clare. It is a "personal favourite" of fellow crime fiction author Michael J. McCann, Less impressed is Donna Lypchuk, who condemned The Hua Shan Hospital Murders in her review for its attitude towards and depiction of "East Asian women" and Chinese people in general, asserting that it read "like a speedily written treatment for a movie" and that it was "riddled with stereotypes and clichés that make fun of Chinese people's mannerisms and the way they speak."

=== Accolade ===
The Hua Shan Hospital Murders was shortlisted for the Arthur Ellis Award for the best crime novel of 2003.

== Adaptations ==
In 2008, Rotenberg was working with the CBC on an adaptation of the series for television, suggesting this would have to be a co-production with either Taiwan or Hong Kong. More recently, the novels have been said to be under consideration by HBO.

== Bibliography ==
Series

- The Shanghai Murders (1998)
- The Lake Ching Murders (2001)
- The Hua Shan Hospital Murders (2003)
- The Hamlet Murders (2004)
- The Golden Mountain Murders (2005)

Related work

- Shanghai (2008)
