= Good Sons =

Crime novel by K. C. Constantine

- Author: K. C. Constantine
- Language: English
- Publisher: The Mysterious Press of Warner Books
- Publication date: 1996
- Publication place: United States
- Media type: Print (hardback)
- Pages: 304
- ISBN: 0-89296-544-4
- OCLC: 32236924
- Preceded by: Cranks and Shadows
- Followed by: Family Values

Good Sons is a crime novel by the American writer K. C. Constantine set in 1990s Rocksburg, a fictional, blue-collar, Rust Belt town in Western Pennsylvania, modeled on the author's hometown of McKees Rocks, Pennsylvania, adjacent to Pittsburgh.

Detective Sergeant Ruggiero "Rugs" Carlucci, the self-deprecating protégé of recently retired Mario Balzic, is the protagonist.

It tells the story of Carlucci, who finds himself in line as Balzic's likely successor as Rocksburg Chief of Police, that is if he can solve the case of a local businesswoman who has been raped and battered.

It is the twelfth book in the 17-volume Rocksburg series.
