= The Junction Chronicles =

Novel trilogy by David Rotenberg

- An advance copy of The Placebo Effect
- The Placebo Effect; A Murder of Crows; The Glass House
- Author: David Rotenberg
- Country: Canada
- Language: English
- Genre: Speculative fiction Thriller
- Publisher: Simon & Schuster
- Published: 2012–2014
- Media type: Print

The Junction Chronicles is a trilogy of Canadian speculative thrillers by David Rotenberg, whose protagonist, acting coach Decker Roberts, a synaesthete with a special talent for determining the truth in statements, lives in the neighbourhood of The Junction in Toronto, supplementing his income with his unique talent and becoming involved with American intelligence agents after his life begins to fall apart. The series was first published by Simon & Schuster between 2012 and 2014.

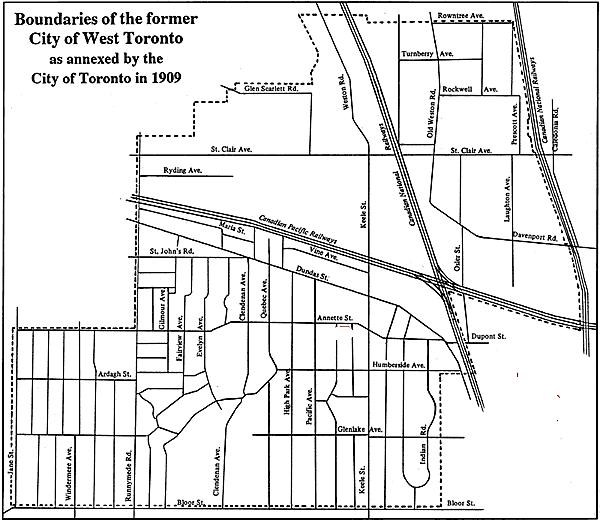
City of West Toronto, when annexed in 1909

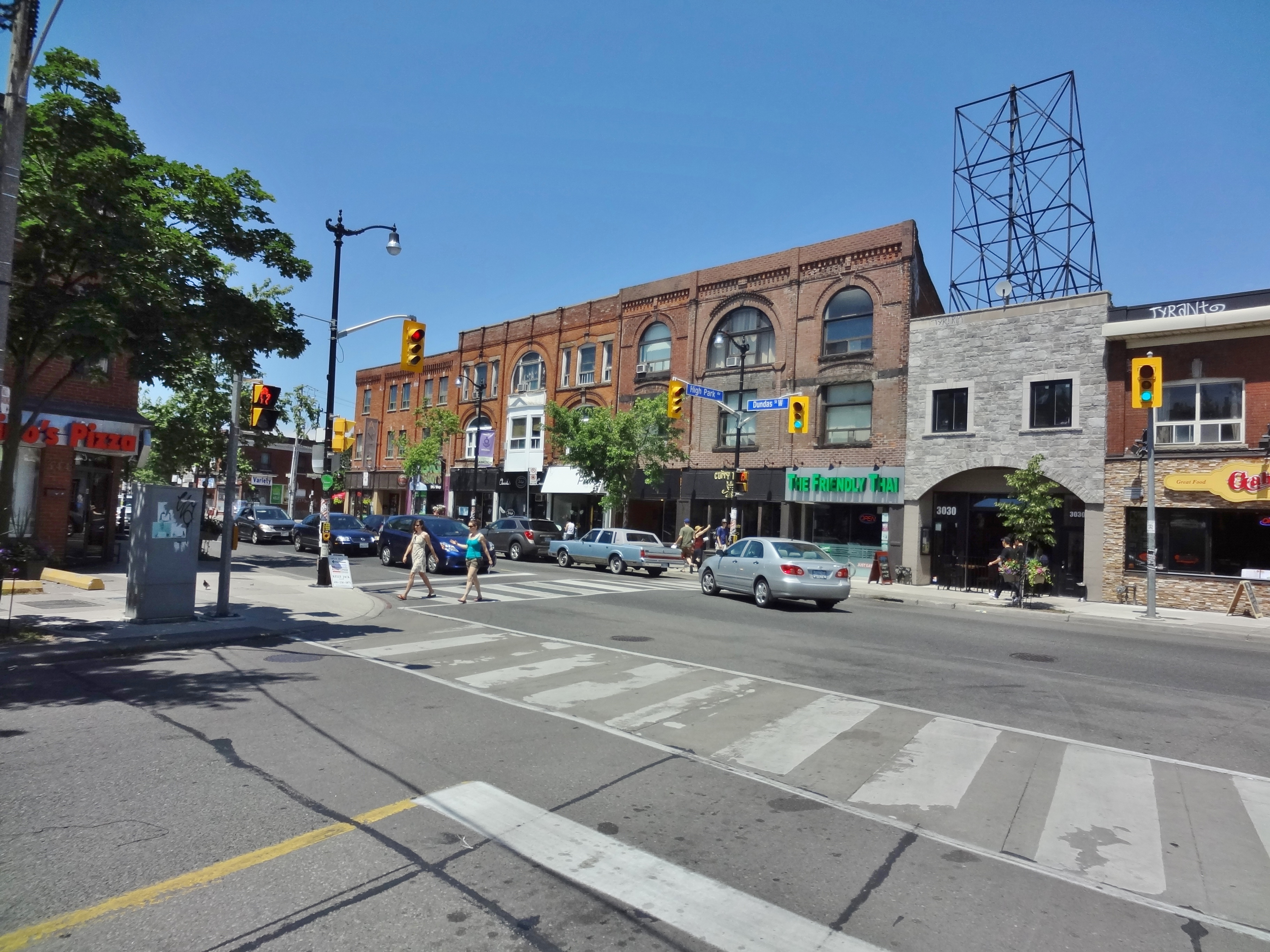
Corner of Dundas Street and High Park Avenue, The Junction, July 2013

== Synopsis ==
=== The Placebo Effect ===
In a prologue set in 1988, Decker Roberts, aged 22, stands in Chartres Cathedral, where he meets a monk who asks whether he has decided to stay. Brother Malcolm offers to teach him everything he knows and in return, the cathedral and ministry will become his home, and he will avoid "the room with no windows – and the hanging man".

The young Roberts knew then, as the older Roberts knows now, that the monk spoke the truth, as he always knows when anyone speaks the truth, a unique benefit of his particular form of synaesthesia, a neurological condition. For years, this talent has proven to be a lucrative sideline to his regular work as a theatre director and acting coach based in The Junction, Toronto. Roberts is hired by companies because he can tell them if their potential recruits are lying. He leads a successful double life, carefully compartmentalized with a myriad of alter egos. His inner life, however, is one of sorrow, having lost his wife to ALS and missing his estranged son, Seth. He is also disturbed by the excessive number of churches in the area. He believes they are there to prevent an evil from re-appearing. He senses its existence when he walks the streets and feels the Junction "hunch around him in the cold."

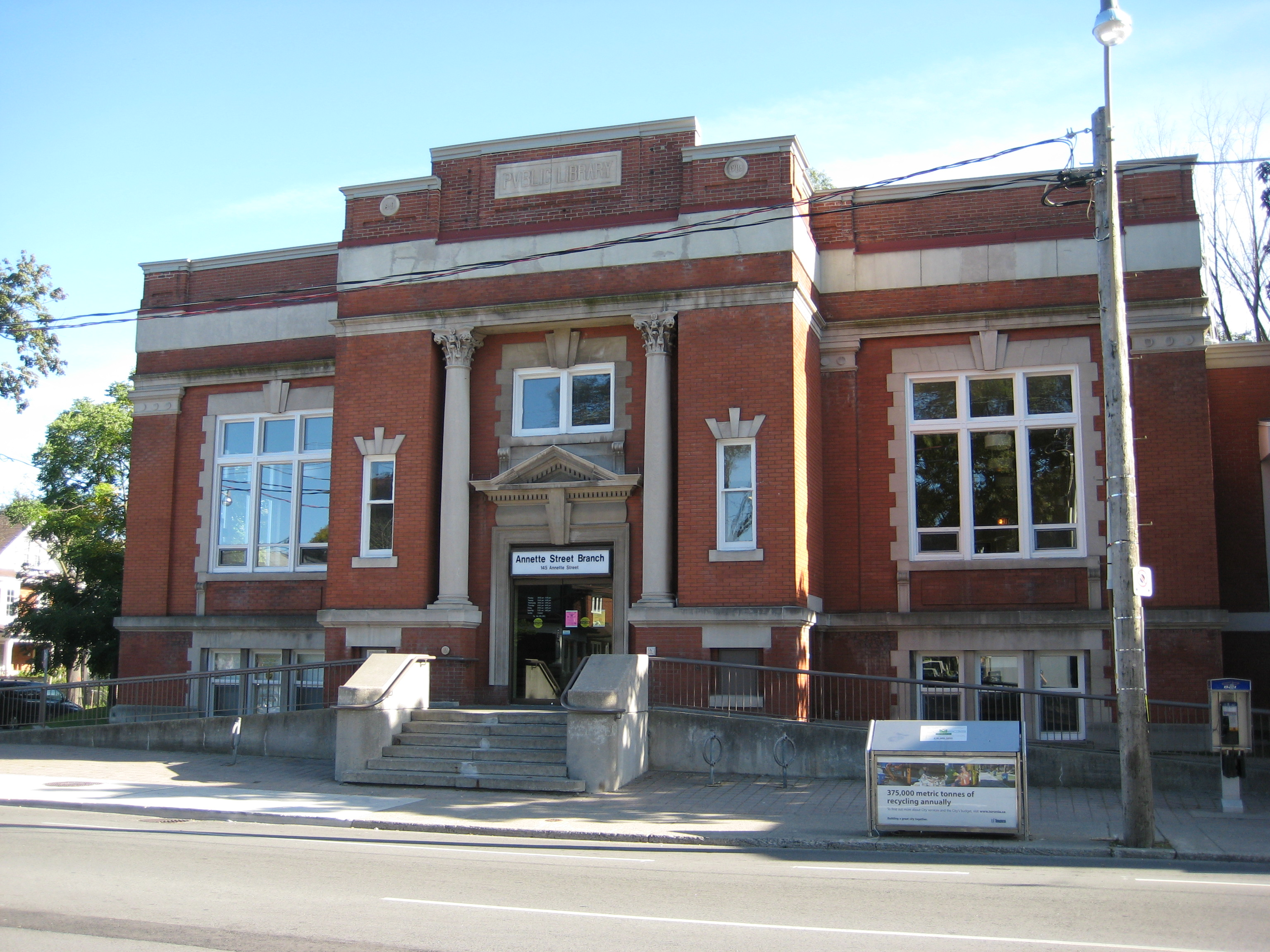
Annette Street Public Library

When homeless synaesthete Michael Shedloski arrives in the Junction, he has a vision of a boy dangling from a lamp post across from the public library on Annette Street, grasping a rope at his neck, trying in vain to get his last breath. The event is real, but took place a century earlier. Hearing of this, Roberts knows that the hanged boy is a "marker" – that there must be a portal in the Junction. Then he realizes that its name does not really refer to a railroad depot as most of its residents believe, but rather to a point of connection, a connection between this world and another, and the hanged boy marks the access.

Henry-Clay Yolles, the CEO of a pharmaceutical company, exploits Sedloski's unique talent for determining perfect ratios, allowing the company to know how many placebo pills can be included in a prescription as a cost saving measure without affecting the drug's efficaciousness. Yolles Pharmaceuticals is now interested in Roberts. A resentful Shedloski publicly protests his dismissal by Yolles and tries to warn Roberts, but is killed. Yolles now needs to eliminate Roberts because he might discover the truth about its new product.

Meanwhile, in Washington D.C., the National Security Agency is also interested in Roberts as a means of evaluating statements by terrorists. Yslan Hicks, who studies synasethetes, has been observing him. The NSA becomes more involved as it perceives its potential asset is threatened.

Narrowly escaping death when his house burns down, it does not occur to Roberts that it was no accident. Next, his finances are crippled, and his studio condemned. He realizes that he must have heard something in one of his sessions that he should not have, and goes on the run trying to work out why he has been targeted and by whom.

His escape route takes him from coast to coast, north to south, through small towns and big cities across North America, as both pursuer and pursued. As Roberts draws closer to his quarry, he grudgingly agrees to work with and for the NSA. Agent Yslan Hicks tells him his friend Crazy Eddie betrayed him, but he refuses to believe it.

=== A Murder of Crows ===
Fourteen months have passed since the incident with Yolles Pharmaceuticals. Roberts has spent some time applying his talent in Las Vegas, simultaneously seeking information about Seth, who is suffering from am aggressive form of cancer of the bladder. Crazy Eddie is still trying to win back his daughter, and to do so he intends to incriminate Ira Charendoff, the lawyer to whom he betrayed Roberts over a year earlier. In order to clear the playing field and keep the NSA off his best friend's back at the same time, Eddie sends Roberts to South Africa. A close eye is being kept on both men and others like them by the NSA with a view to using them for combating terrorism.

In upper New York State, the elite science-focused Ancaster College prepares for spring graduation. Aggrieved professor Neil Frost and resentful janitor Walter Jones conspire to exact violent revenge against the faculty and students. Bombs explode at the graduation ceremony killing over 200 people, the worst terrorist attack on American soil since 9/11. Led by the NSA, America's security forces descend upon Ancaster, and track down Roberts in South Africa, using Seth's whereabouts to persuade him to return to the United States and determine the veracity of hundreds of video statements.

Over the course of the work, Roberts shows that his gift has limitations: while he can tell that someone is not telling the truth, he cannot say whether that person is lying, that is, if an untruth is deliberate. Worse, since almost everyone in the videos is not telling the truth about something, it is hard to determine who may have been involved.

Roberts learns that the NSA has been tracking other people like him, including a tiny childlike woman named Viola Tripping who can reveal the final thoughts of a deceased person just before death. Agent Yslan Hicks takes the two of them to the crime scene at Ancaster so that Tripping can read the victims' final thoughts and Roberts can tell if those statements were truthful.

Roberts privately pieces together what happened, but withholds this information from the NSA. In the course of their work, Tripping also provides Roberts with a vision of his estranged son Seth's whereabouts — in Namibia.

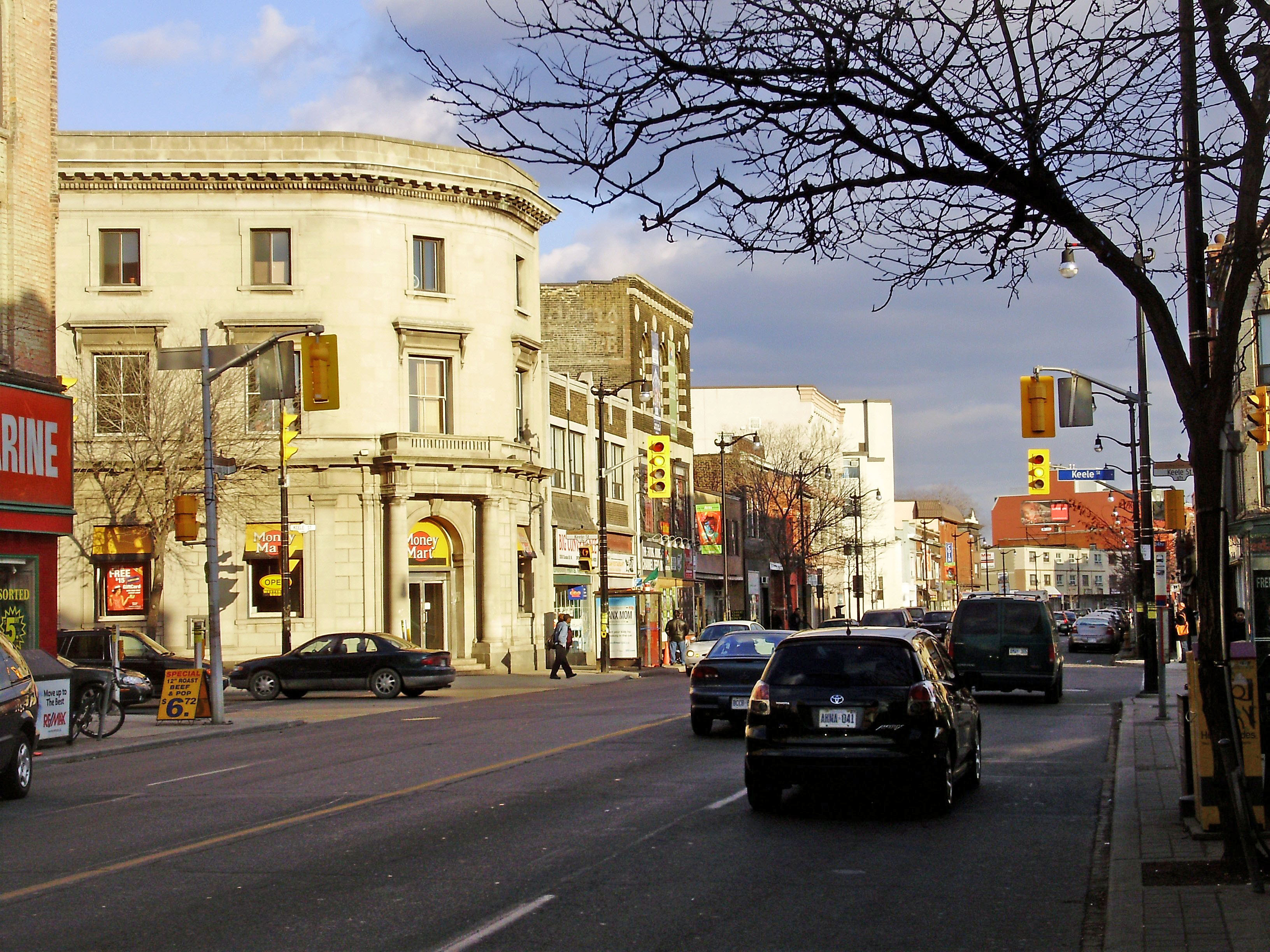
Dundas Street and Keele Avenue, The Junction

=== The Glass House, or, When the Moon's Too Thin for Stories ===
In Namibia, Roberts struggles to find his way in isolation. Seth, whose cancer is advancing swiftly, is kidnapped by WJ, a musical prodigy who is unable to feel and who desperately wants to learn from Seth's special abilities.

The kidnapping sets a mysterious chain of events in motion. Seth, it seems, is the key to everyone's plans: his inherited "gifts" are more powerful than his father's, and there are many who will do anything to control them.

Yslan Hicks desperately needs to find both father and son to deal with an urgent threat faced by the NSA. When the trails run cold, Hicks turns to Roberts' old friends for help, but they quickly find themselves confronting an ancient conspiracy, one that draws the synaesthetes, via "waking dreams" of a "glass house", back to The Junction, the place where a young boy was killed by hanging shortly after 1900.

Roberts, his friends, and the NSA are inexorably drawn towards a conclusion that will change both themselves and the world around them.

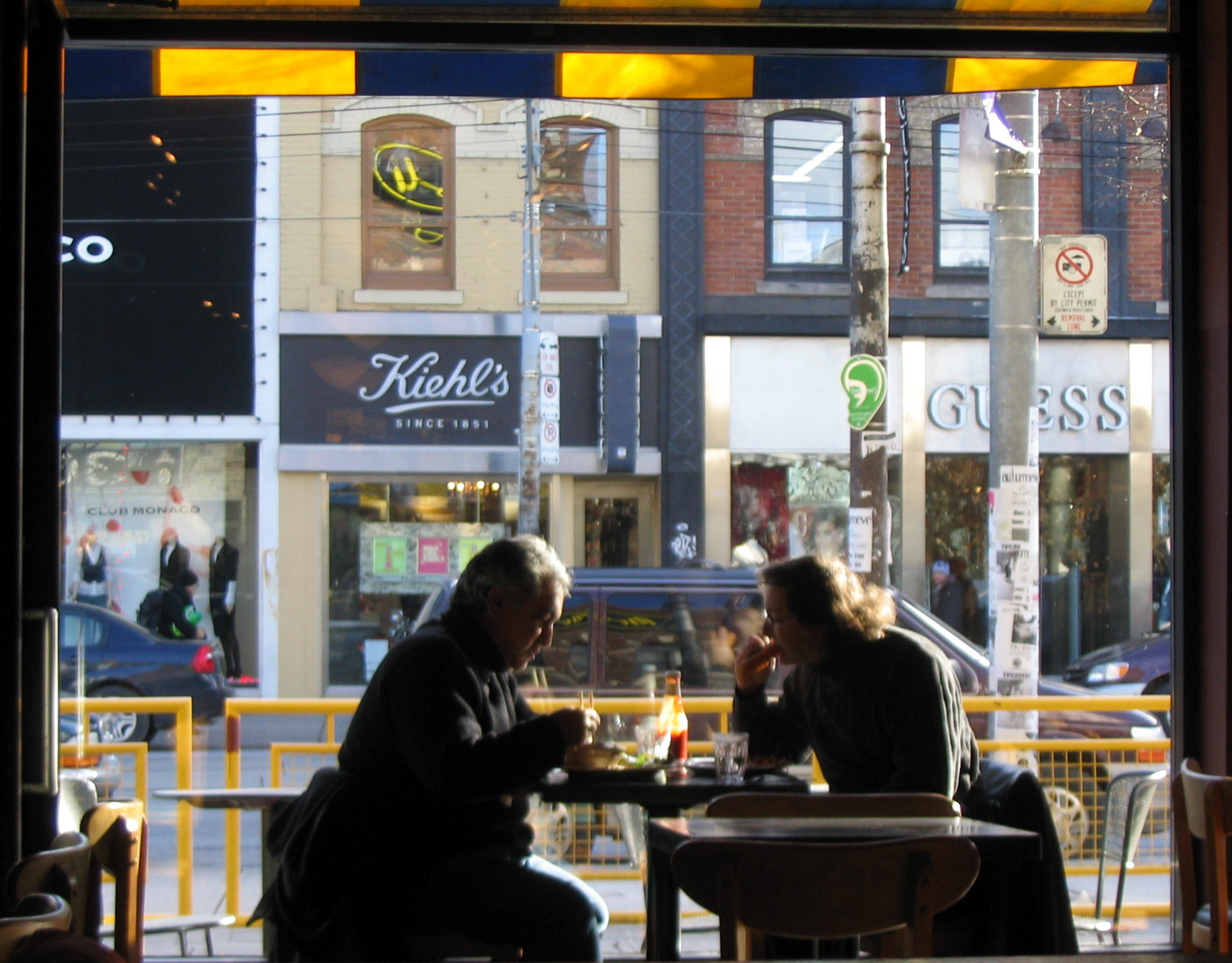
View of Queen West

== Setting ==
The Placebo Effect features such Junction landmarks as Squirly's and the Swan Diner (both on Queen West).

There's something hunched about The Junction. There's something... there's something hidden. There are secrets. As a writer, secrets interest me.

— David Rotenberg

Rotenberg spoke of the Junction area as "a different world" than the Greater Toronto Area: "For years we had the stockyards just around the corner, hot dog Tuesday was unbelievable... all those churches—so many churches in such a small area." referring to Annette Street. Rotenberg wondered if something happened in the neighbourhood that led to the building of so many churches, and did some research, discovering that some police records disappeared when the area was ammalgamated with Toronto: "I thought, 'What awful thing happened here that some police records were lost?'" and grew suspicious that ammalgamation provided a convenient opportunity to destroy evidence of a crime by "wealthy people". These ideas are explored in some depth in The Placebo Effect.

While the initial setting for the series is The Junction, a lot of the action in the first novel actually takes place in New York City, and its landmarks figure prominently. Rotenberg lived there for about a dozen years, and he still knew the city better than he did Greater Toronto. Much of the action in the second novel also takes place in other parts of Canada and the United States, in the wake of a terrorist attack at a college in Upper New York State. As well, the plot of the second and third novels takes the protagonist to South Africa and Namibia.

== Characters ==
=== Decker Roberts ===
Series protagonist Decker Roberts is a middle aged acting coach and a widower, with a "strained" relationship with his son Seth. He has a neurological condition called synaesthesia, which, in his case, has led to the innate ability to "see if people are telling the truth".

Roberts is a synesthete; he "sees" language and can tell when people are not telling the truth, but only just. He sees designs and lines that define absolute truth and an absolute lie, but the nuances evade him. If the speaker tells a lie he truly believes to be truth, Decker sees "truth."

When he hears a statement he can close his eyes and the patterns he sees tell him if the statement is true. When the ability manifests, Roberts senses "a stream of cool, clear air above him ... something heavy in his right hand and a coldness." He sees "a series of squiggly lines that appear in his line of vision when someone is talking".

Despite his unique insight, or perhaps somehow because of it, Roberts is repeatedly told he is a "terrible liar." Rotenberg said of the character that he is an "outsider" and a "loner", and, "as in all my previous novels wants desperately to be part of his society but also fights to keep intact those things that make him special and apart." He dislikes police officers and the National Security Agency he grudgingly works for, as he "distrusts authority of any sort" He has "used his head to keep ahead of the inherent violence all around him", not because he is "a weakling or a coward"; rather, he "sees and understands the diminishing returns of violence." Only his "closest friends" know about his ability, which he has used for years to supplement his income through a sideline working for companies as a "human lie detector" screening potential new employees. He keeps his identity a secret from these employers through "a myriad of alter egos."

As for Decker and myself — Decker does teach the unique approach to acting that I developed — even works at the studio of which I am the Artistic Director. He knows the parts of the world that I know — Toronto, Vancouver, Montreal, New York City, Pittsburgh, New Orleans, North Carolina, Cape Town, Namibia — I think you write what you know. In some way most authors write versions of themselves — themselves as fools, themselves as heroes, themselves as children, themselves out of control etc.

— David Rotenberg

The notion that there may be others of "his kind" only dawns on him slowly, and "that he needs to find them to understand who and what he is." Steven Patrick Clare observes: "By day he seems sociable, liked and respected by his peers and pupils. After hours, however, he seeks solace with select company, often through synesthesia social-media sites." On more than one occasion Roberts says to himself: "You are from them, but not of them", as though he thinks of himself as other than, or perhaps better than, "his kind", other synaesthetes. Roberts also comes to believe that each time he uses his gift "someone close to him gets hurt." His wife's last words to him were, "What have you done, Decker: What have you done?"

Roberts teaches acting at the Pro Actors Lab, the institute founded by Rotenberg and where he was still teaching at the time the novels were written. Roberts even directed a couple of plays on Broadway, the same as Rotenberg. It is not the first time Rotenberg makes use of "autobiographical details": in the Zhong Fong novels there is a Canadian director, Geoffrey Hyland, who teaches "precisely" what Rotenberg did and directs "exactly" what he directed, and who in turn was taught by Toronto-based Charles Roeg, who can always tell when people are telling the truth.

=== NSA agents ===
==== Yslan Hicks ====
Special Agent Yslan Hicks, "a young blond woman with almost translucent eyes," responsible for monitoring Roberts and other synaeesthetes like him. She often makes reference to her resemblance to the fictional character Clarice Starling. When introduced, she "plays by the rules" of the NSA, but her time spent with Roberts influences her: she can no longer lie, and turns introspective, wondering she played by the rules "when the NSA essentially operates without them," and when the phenomenon exhibited by Roberts "can't be explained by logic."

==== Leonard Harrison ====
Head of the NSA Leonard Harrison is described as a Tommy Lee Jones "without the snark".

=== Synaesthetes ===
==== Seth Roberts ====
Seth Roberts is the protagonist's son. His mother died of ALS. Nineteen years old in The Placebo Effect, the younger Roberts resents his father, apparently blaming him for his mother's death; he refers to his mother's last words when he writes a message to his father: "This is what happens when you get close to people Dad. Stay away from me." The young man has inherited the same neurological condition, and his talents "may be even greater than his father's." Like his father, he is being tracked by the NSA, among others.

==== Crazy Eddie ====
A close friend of Decker Roberts and "fellow synaesthete", their relationship "goes back a very long time and they obviously have a special understanding between one another, often not needing to ask for explanations or give details." Eddie is described by critics variously as a "technology whiz", computer "nerd", or "genius". He is not entirely reliable or trustworthy, motivated primarily by a desire to get his daughter back, berating Roberts for not tracking his son down.

==== Michael (Mike) Shedloski ====
Shedloski has a gift for sensing balance, creating unique sculptures from ordinary items; he can determine the ratios that provide balance in many other circumstances. He is homeless.

==== Viola Tripping ====
Introduced in A Murder of Crows, Viola Tripping is presented as "simultaneously a woman and a little girl in both appearance and mannerisms" who can "recite the last thoughts of dead people."

=== Antagonists ===
==== Henry-Clay Yolles ====
The Cincinnati CEO of Yolles Pharmaceuticals and the principal antagonist of The Placebo Effect, he is unscrupulous.

==== Ira Charendoff ====
A lawyer representing parties interested in, or involved with cases against, both Decker Roberts and Crazy Eddie, he manipulates the latter against the former in The Placebo Effect, and remains Eddie's antagonist in A Murder of Crows.

==== Neil Frost and Walter Jones ====
Professor Neil Frost harbours a grudge against his colleagues at Ancaster College, "aggravated by a university system that pays him modestly and ever more frustrated at being denied a full professorship." In A Murder of Crows, he conspires to commit heinous crime of mass murder with Walter Jones, a janitor at Ancaster with a scatalogical obsession who stalks female students and comes to display psychopathic tendencies. Jones resents the students and faculty alike for their "sense of superiority", believing himself to be "the equal or better of anyone at the university."

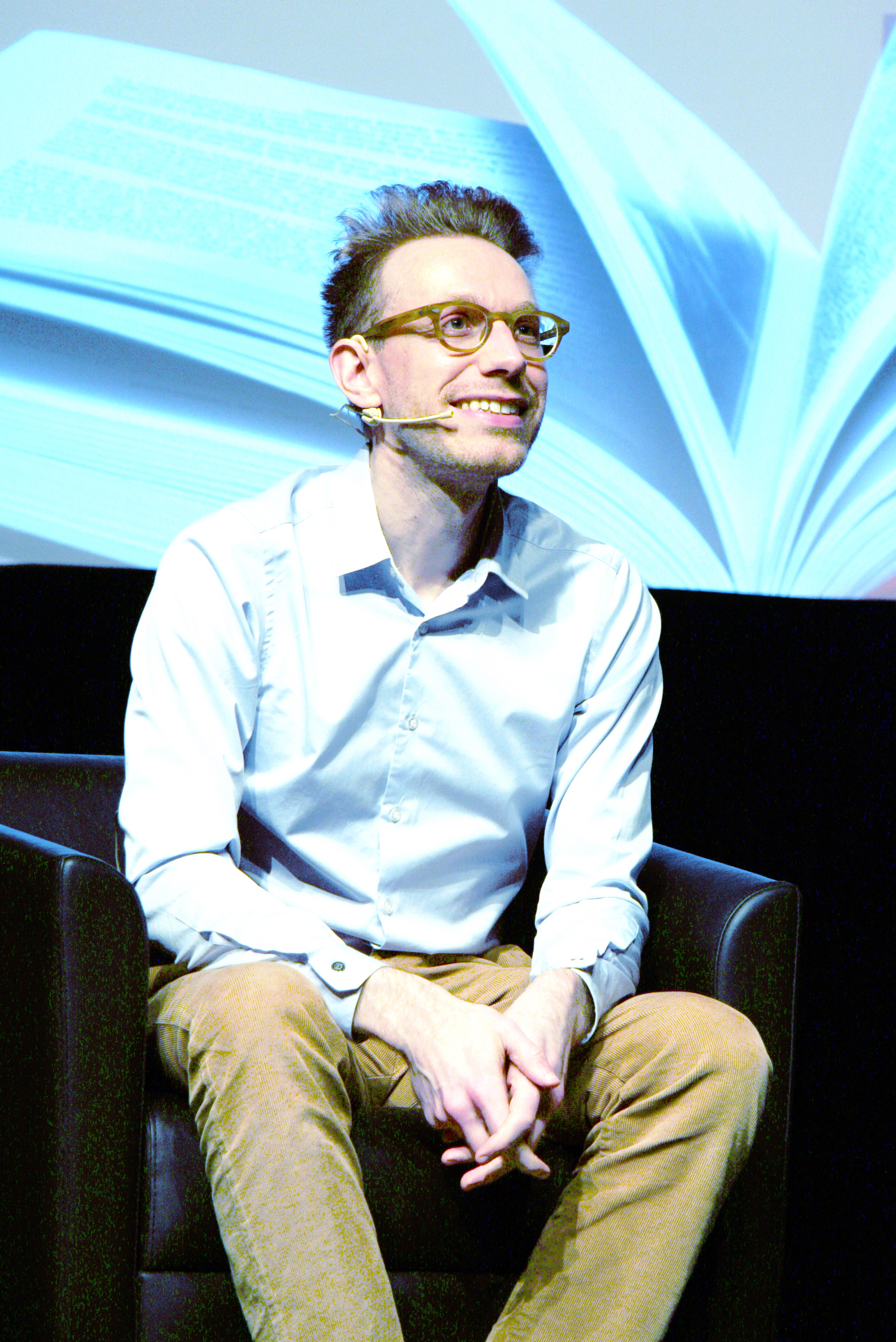
Daniel Tammet, a synaesthete autistic savant.

==== WJ ====
Introduced in The Glass House, WJ is a highly talented mathematician who has used his skills with numbers to become wealthy, but is frustrated by his incapacity to enjoy it for lack of feelings: he cannot appreciate relationships, and concepts like beauty or ugliness "are but words." Music is at the centre of the man's life: he is a technically skilled cellist but to him the notes are "merely sounds".

== Themes ==
=== Synaesthesia ===
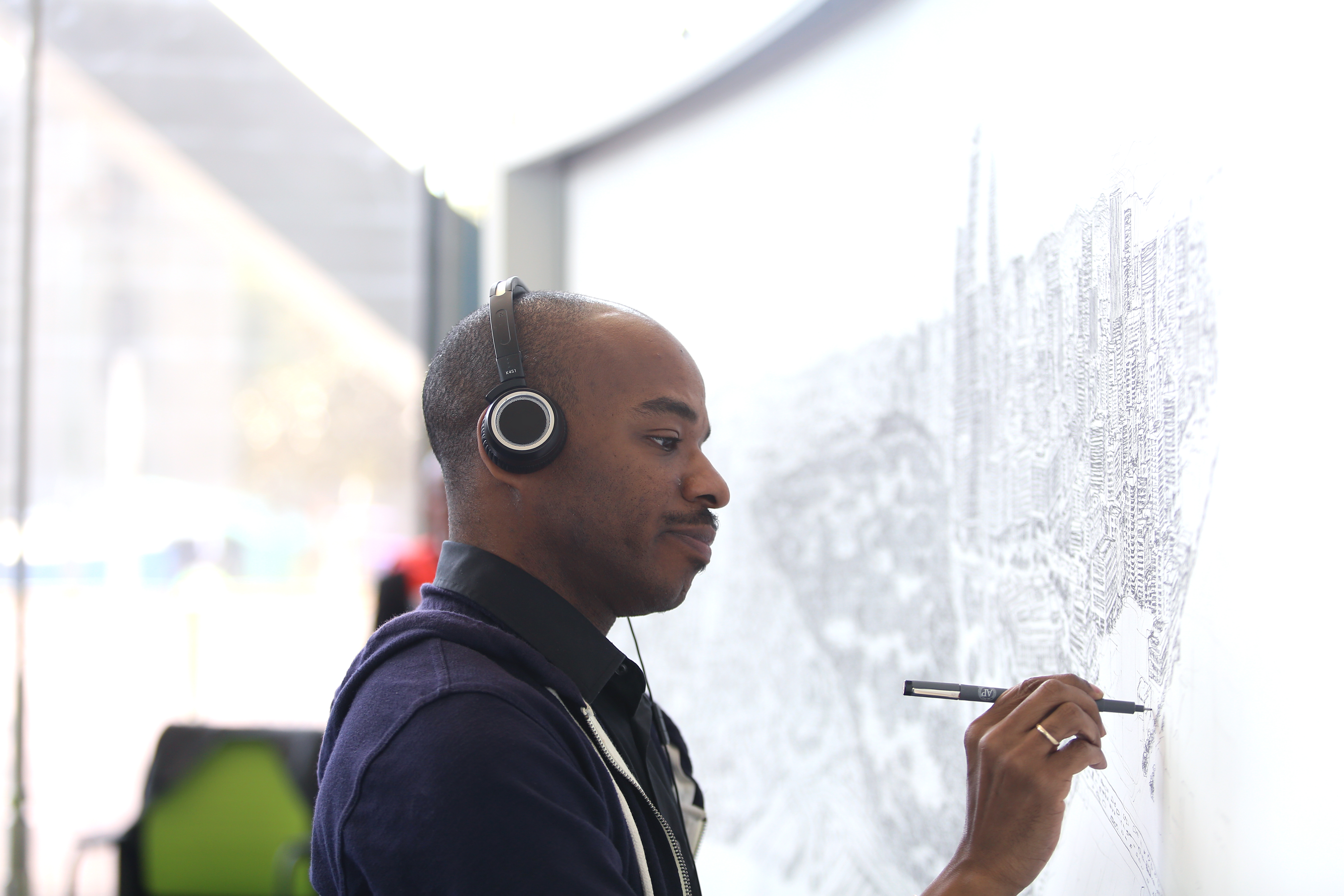
Stephen Wiltshire "the human camera"

Outside the speculative fictional world of the novel, a synaesthete is "someone whose awareness mixes two or more senses"; it is a "documented condition" which occurs naturally but may also be linked to head injuries. Rotenberg's own conception of synaesthesia elaborates on this as a condition bestowing the person "access to the 'other'", referring to documentaries he had seen on the synaesthete Daniel Tammet, who is also an autistic savant, as an example, a man with "special gifts in mathematics and languages", who sees numbers in colours, shapes and sizes and learned conversational Icelandic in a week. Rotenberg also referenced autistic savant Stephen Wiltshire ("the human camera"), and Ken Peek, the inspiration for the film Rain Man.

Doubt as to the accuracy of the term in-universe is introduced at the beginning of A Murder of Crows, when NSA Special Agent Yslan Hicks questions the agency's use of "synaesthetes" for describing the people she monitors; Leonard Harrison retorts: "But we had to call them something." She would rather call them "the Gifted". Some of them effectively display "superpowers", some of which potentially qualify as "supernatural"; the most outstanding example is Viola Tripping, whom Andrew Wilmot characterizes as really "a medium for speaking to the dead".

=== Outsiders ===
==== A Canadian in the U.S. ====
Rotenberg stated more than once that Roberts is a "loner" but also an "outsider", and in more than one sense. When asked by Bill Selnes why the Canadian hero of a Canadian novel criss-crosses the American border so many times, Rotenberg pointed out that a lead character who is Canadian "allows a perspective on America that often Americans don't have." Rotenberg lived in the U.S. for a dozen years, his wife is a Puerto Rican American, both children dual citizens. "One lives in the States; the other has the knee jerk hatred of America that is pretty common here."

Our relationship with the elephant down there is pretty darned important for us to understand past the knee jerk stuff. Hence, start in Toronto and work south. I was born and raised in Toronto, although I left for 15 years I've been back for 22... and there are times that publishers want to push for American Heroes. Decker's an outsider, we as Canadians are outsiders to the world's most powerful entity, crumbling as it may be.

Bill Selnes later remarked: "Making the hero a Canadian rather than an American when part of the story is set in the United States is so uncommon I do not think I have read another mystery with a comparable hero."

==== An atypical hero ====
Roberts is an atypical literary action hero in that he displays no excessive strength, nor skill with weapons. Asked by Selnes why the character was created "with his mind his primary resource", Rotenberg said: "Partially because he's an outsider. Partially because I've got pretty sick of cops and sleuths altogether. How many times can a guy be hit on the back of the head and get back up on his feet and continue?" Agreeing with the reasoning behind Rotenberg's decision, Selnes later wrote: "It is tiring to read of fictional heroes being battered about and then swiftly rising again to smite the bad guy. At times I think there is evolving a new rule for thrillers that it cannot be a thriller without a massive body count."

== Writing ==
=== Background ===
By the early 2010s, David Rotenberg had become established as the author of the Zhong Fong series of mystery novels about a Chinese detective based primarily in the city of Shanghai, and then Shanghai, an epic historical novel also set in Shanghai. Rotenberg was approached by Simon & Schuster to write something else: "After what amounts to eight novels about and around China I was ready for a change. I've been back in Toronto since 1987 after an absence of about 18 years. And yet in all that time — and all those novels — I hadn't written a word about the city." He said "it was finally time to look around and try to write about home."

=== Process ===
As the Zhong Fong novels are police procedurals, Rotenberg purposefully had his writing space cluttered with images and books when he wrote it: "two large modern desks at right angles to each other — the whole thing dominated by a large computer monitor. It felt that the job was to produce order from the chaos — just as police officers must." For The Junction Chronicles, he felt he needed a different kind of workspace for a different kind of literary work, "spare — filled with leaps in time and space, often defying normal rules of storytelling", pushing the boundaries: "Here the job has to do with entering blank spaces — creating from whole cloth." It took him seven weeks and three days of "intense looking" to find the desk for his new office. Made from reclaimed wood, and only a foot and a half deep and about four and half feet long, it is "a piece of art in and of itself." The desk has no drawers or file cabinets nor in and out trays, just a small laptop. "Even the hard copies of what I've written ... kept in a book shelf out of the room."

=== Structure and genre ===
The Junction Chronicles is an episodic series: in order to follow the action and understand the characters, readers must read the three novels in order, starting with The Placebo Effect. It is written in "short, snappy chapters" sometimes less than a page in length. At the time Rotenberg had finished writing the draft of A Murder of Crows in early 2012, he described it as open-ended, anticipating that he would write as many as five or more novels in the series.

As a "speculative thriller" series, the novels feature elements which may be understood as either supernatural or paranormal fiction, or science fiction, depending on the reader. In 2018, Richard Lanoie reviewed The Placebo Effect a "mystery" novel. In The Glass House, what Bill Selnes calls the "touch of the supernatural" in the first two novels "has taken over the story": the synaesthetes' exceptional talents are "supplemented" by "mystical abilities" such as telepathy.

== Reception ==
=== Critical response to The Placebo Effect ===
Richard Lanoie's review of The Placebo Effect is overwhelmingly positive: "Not only is Decker Roberts a very original and interesting character but the premise behind the character, the plot itself, and even the writing are fresh."

Stephen Patrick Clare said Rotenberg blended the best elements of his previous novels, with a "quirky cast of characters in an entertaining and engaging read that is distinctly Canadian", and dialogue that "is crisp, clear and concise, but never obvious or over-the-top". Clare is ambivalent about the series protagonist Derek Roberts:

Amidst the adventure, there is ample opportunity for Roberts' true persona to emerge. Unfortunately, despite being privy to his peculiar private life, the protagonist never feels fully fleshed out. That said, the book's weakest link might also be its greatest strength; the author's glaring omission of Roberts' inner life leaves a gaping hole that readers can fill in on their own. As such, it is in the power of what is left unsaid — the silent spaces in between — that the novel finds its... voice.

Robert J. Wiersema called it a "somewhat workmanlike" thriller "possessed of an enthralling undercurrent that allows it to transcend its genre and shine on its own terms", and that Rotenberg "reveals a surprising depth and intricacy, not in the mechanics of his plot, but at the level of characterization."

This second novel in the Junction Chronicles is every bit as good as the first... Rotenberg likes to take little byways off the plot and this can be disconcerting. But not to complain. A Murder Of Crows is a slick and readable thriller with great characters... and lots of action. This is a great rainy-day companion.

— Margaret Cannon

Andrew Wilmot disagrees, finding characterization to be the single greatest problem in the novel, but far from the only one: Rotenberg "plays fast and loose with the concept of synaesthesia." Wilmot also dislikes "film- and pop culture-based asides" which "add little if anything to the characters".

=== Critical response to A Murder of Crows ===
Valerie Senyk appreciated how Rotenberg built "suspenseful momentum" in telling the story: "It is a pleasure to read intelligent thrillers by Canadian writers. David Rotenberg ... is a man of many talents who brings his substantial experience in the theatre to his novels. Not only are they extremely literate and sophisticated, they boast truly inventive characters."

Bill Selnes found "the fascinating characters of the synaesthetes" were the strength of the novel, which "flows well", despite the plot being "disjointed at times", noting also that the title is "brilliantly related to the plot." Rotenberg has created "a unique form of sleuth in Roberts." Joseph Serge thought the "best parts" of A Murder of Crows were those related to the character of the janitor who blows up the graduating class of Ancaster College, comparing this aspect favourably to Thomas Harris' Silence of the Lambs: "Rotenberg gets us inside the mind of the psychopath. We find out about the people who've hurt him in the past and why he agrees to help the professor." Serge finds that after the investigation with Roberts and Viola Tripping, however, the novel's pace slows "drastically":

Although the NSA was using the synaesthetes to track down the killer or killers, there is never a sense of urgency, of racing against the clock. There is no reason to believe the killer or killers will strike again... A lot of fuss is made made about the U.S. president travelling to Ancaster College to speak at the memorial service, but nothing really comes of it, and we are left with an unsatisfying Edgar Allen [sic] Poe-style climax involving a premature burial.

Sarah Weinman finds the action fast-paced, "even a little too frenetic," despite the introspection, "especially on the part of Decker's NSA handler Yslan Hicks", a conflict which "undercuts the believability" of the novel: "it's fun while reading, but the dots don't quite connect the way they are supposed to."

Andrew Wilmot criticizes the novel for the same flaws he found in The Placebo Effect, such as "frustratingly thin" characters, "a problem that stems in large part from the breakneck pace of each very short chapter". But the sequel has even more issues: political asides "that feel less tied to the characters and more as if they are a product of the author breaking the fourth wall to tell us how he feels about the world"; a "strange and out of place racial insensitivity on display when describing the almost magical connection most Africans seem to have to the planet, or the very free-flowing anti-Muslim language used in sections describing suspects in the attack." As well, there is "insensitivity displayed towards women and size and sexual attraction."

=== Critical response to The Glass House ===
Bill Selnes found The Glass House "interesting" but thought it demanded greater suspension of disbelief than the first two novels in the series: "The book became a form of fable requiring the reader to either suspend conventional assessments or accept the plot has become a modern myth." While he also found the plot "disjointed", and the "connections between the plot lines awkward", he conceded that those who enjoy the paranormal ("an unconventional paranormal if that is possible") will be "fascinated" by the novel.

== Adaptations ==
A series of CNIB audiobooks was produced in 2015, narrated by Maureen McAdams (The Placebo Effect), Pat Softly (A Murder of Crows), and Pat Davey (The Glass House).

In early 2012, Rotenberg said that The Placebo Effect had been optioned by a "major" Los Angeles producer who was then working on Justified (elsewhere confirmed as Don Kurt). In 2018, it was announced that the entire trilogy had been optioned by Don Kurt for television.

== Bibliography ==
- The Placebo Effect (2012)
- A Murder of Crows (2013)
- The Glass House (2014)
