= Shanghai (novel) =

Historical novel by David Rotenberg

- Dust jacket
- Author: David Rotenberg
- Language: English
- Genre: Epic historical fiction
- Publisher: Penguin Canada; Viking Canada
- Publication date: 1 January 2008 (Canada)
- Publication place: Canada
- Media type: Print (hard- and softcover); Electronic (Kindle)
- Pages: 787
- ISBN: 9780670066155
- OCLC: 225773403
- LC Class: PR9199.3 .R618 S52 2008

Shanghai: The Ivory Compact is an epic historical novel by Canadian theatre director and acting coach David Rotenberg, spanning several centuries of the history of the city of Shanghai. While Shanghai was written as a stand-alone story, it includes cameo appearances by young versions of characters who appear in Rotenberg's detective series set in contemporary Shanghai. Shanghai received critical acclaim and sold well worldwide.

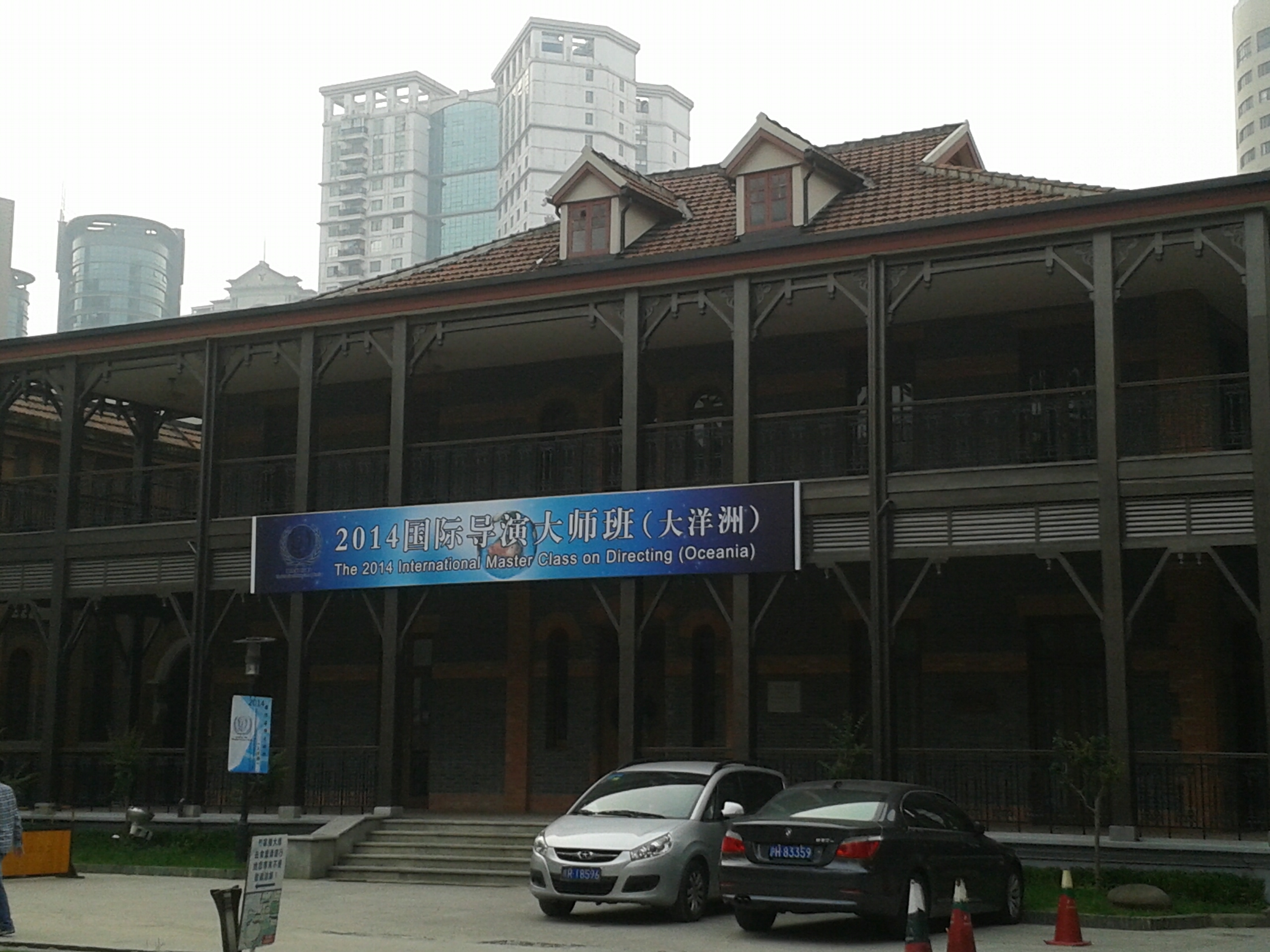
Shanghai Theatre Academy

Map of Shanghai, 1884

== Synopsis ==
With his last breath, Q'in She Huang, the first Emperor of China, entrusts his followers with a sacred task in the year 207 BCE. Scenes intricately carved into a narwhal tusk show the future of a city "at the Bend in the River," and the Emperor's chosen three — his favourite concubine, head Confucian, and personal bodyguard — must set events in motion so that these prophecies are fulfilled, by passing their traditions down through the generations.

About two thousand years later, in the mid 19th century, the descendants of the chosen three watch as Shanghai is invaded by opium traders and missionaries from Europe, America, and the Middle East. Of them all, two families, locked in a rivalry that lasts for generations, are central to the evolution of the city. As history marches on, they clash and intertwine with other locals and foreigners, shaping what will become the centrepiece of the new China, the city of Shanghai.

One family is that of Silas Hardoon, an Iraqi Jew at the centre of more than one scandal, marrying his Chinese mistress and later adopting nearly forty neighbourhood orphans. Hardoon and his heirs become a force to be reckoned with from the 1880s to the 1940s.

== Publication history ==
=== Background ===
In 1994, David Rotenberg was invited to direct the first Canadian play to be staged in the People's Republic of China. Rotenberg mounted a production of The Ecstasy of Rita Joe in Mandarin at the Shanghai Theatre Academy at a time when China was going through a "massive transition from a profoundly oppressive socialist state to a basically free market economy – a thrilling time". (Note: Sources vary greatly on how long Rotenberg spent in China, and are unclear about whether he remained after the production was over, variously quoting ten, thirteen, or seventeen weeks.) Rotenberg had six weeks until rehearsals began, and used this time to explore the city with his translator: "Instead of visiting all the usual tourist sites, he went into all the small, dark alleys and chalked up impressions." Rotenberg recalled: "Here was a city that was actively involved in moving from being ignored by the great powers in Beijing to becoming the centre of Asian capitalism... You could feel it all around you. Some of my actors would leave rehearsals because they were setting up kiosks to sell produce on the street." The experience led to him beginning what became his second career, writing the Zhong Fong mystery series set primarily in contemporary Shanghai.

=== Publisher and commission ===
Just before the latest Zhong Fong novel, The Golden Mountain Murders, was published in 2005, Rotenberg received a lunch invitation from Penguin Canada publisher David Davidar and assumed that they would be discussing a sixth Zhong Fong novel, but Davidar had other ideas. "He wanted to know if I could do for Shanghai what James Clavell did for Hong Kong. It gave me pause because I love Clavell's writing." Davidar has said he had "long admired" how well the Zhong Fong novels were written, and how they convey a "sense of place". Whereas the kinds of sagas James Clavell and James A. Michener wrote had since "fallen out of fashion," making the idea "a risky proposition", yet it was still a "publisher's dream".

=== Format ===
Rotenberg wrote Shanghai as three novels, and always counted them as such, even after Penguin decided to issue the work as a single volume for publication in 2008. At about 800,000 words, Shanghai is one of the longest novels ever published; Rotenberg said he received complaints from readers that it was "too heavy for them to carry around".

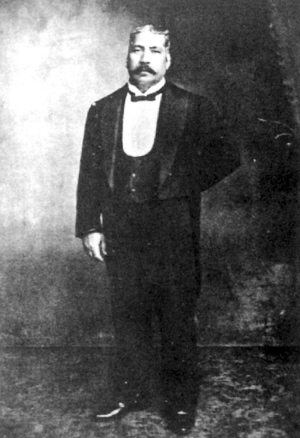
Silas Hardoon (1851–1931)

== Inspiration, genre, and writing ==
David Rotenberg said the inspiration for the novel was a line in a children's book about Silas Hardoon, an Iraqi Jewish opium trader who married his Chinese mistress: "That line was the genesis of Shanghai: The Ivory Compact." Rotenberg's portrayal is quite different from what is known about the historical figure: he was "much more of a bad guy in reality, someone who would threaten people if they didn't pay the rent on time. But the novel needed a more sympathetic main character, and since there aren't too many details known about him or his life, I had more creative licence." To that end, emphasis is placed on the character being "caught between his Jewish roots and his new home's ancient philosophies," and he is witness to his father Richard's "crippling" addiction.

The bulk of the novel spans the history of Shanghai from the Opium Wars in the mid-19th century through to the Chinese Communist Revolution roughly a century later, mixing fact and fiction. Rotenberg compared his novel to Philip Roth's The Plot Against America, a "counterfactual" historical narrative that imagines a Nazi takeover of the United States in the 1930s. "This goes the other way... These were the events of Chinese history. But it imagines that the reasons behind those events are different from the ones historians have given. The novel postulates a series of other forces at work."

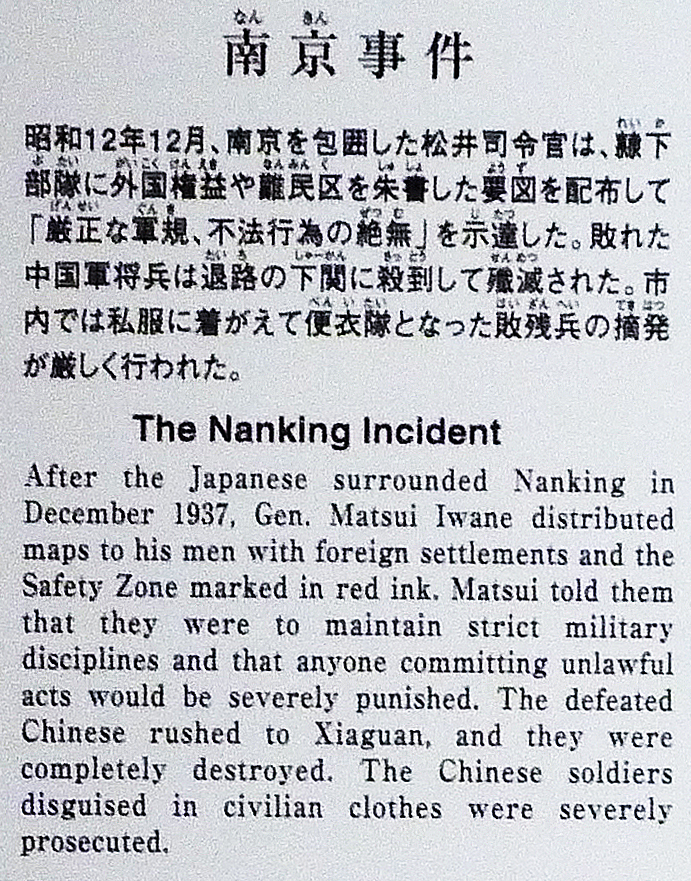

Rotenberg did "extensive research", thereby allowing him to address "difficult subjects" such as the practice of foot binding, depicted in what Sarah Weinman calls a "horrifying scene" in which a young girl reacts stoically to the process: the description is "rooted in verisimilitude from consulting doctors on the precise procedure". Likewise, Rotenberg did not describe the six-week-long Nanking massacre until he learned more about it:

I hesitated to write about it for a long, long, time because it is such a largescale human event. But then I saw a photo exhibit in London about the massacre, where I learned about 18 American missionaries who convinced the Japanese to mark a safe zone in Nanking, and found my way in. At the same time, I wanted to be careful not to portray the Japanese as outright monsters.

== Reception ==
=== Commercial performance ===
By September 2008, Shanghai had acquired foreign rights sales as far afield as Bulgaria, Australia, and Russia. It reached the 9th position on The Globe and Mail's National List of Canadian Bestsellers in June 2009.

=== Critical response ===
Stephen Patrick Clare asserts that the novel's success demonstrated that Rotenberg could "break away from convention without loosening his hold on the imagination of his readers." Sarah Weinman described Shanghai as "jam-packed with story and adventure". Jurgen Gothe calls it "a massive, fascinating, and powerful book that spans genres, maybe confounds them", and asserts that Rotenberg "possesses a prodigious memory for atmosphere and place, and good research skills."

What makes Shanghai so readable and well paced is the unique mix Rotenberg throws into the ring: grace, style, sensitivity, anger, questions... And so the story comes out dreamy and hallucinatory, mysterious and mystical, spiritual and ghostly; comic at times, from lyrical subtlety to total slapstick. Shanghai is heart-pounding and brutal. It puts you right into the thick of the city, its people, its passions.

== Adaptations ==
Shanghai: The Ivory Compact has been reported as being optioned both in the U.S., and in Canada, by Darius Films and by Jane McLean for television as recently as late 2018.

== Related works ==
=== Zhong Fong ===
Though Shanghai is not part of the Zhong Fong series, the character nevertheless makes a cameo appearance towards the end of the novel as a four-year-old.

=== Sequel ===
In 2008, Rotenberg talked about the possibility of a sequel to Shanghai set in post-Second World War Shanghai, contingent on a return visit to the city for more research. However, when Rotenberg was approached by Simon & Schuster "to write something other than about China", after what amounted to "eight novels about and around China" (Rotenberg counting Shanghai as three novels), he was "ready for a change", prompting the writing of the Toronto-set Junction Chronicles series.
