= Classical Theatre Project =

Theatre company based in Ontario, Canada

Classical Theatre Project is a professional theatre company based in Toronto, Ontario, that creates innovative productions of classic plays for a new generation of theatre fans. The company was founded in 2001 and focuses on producing the works of William Shakespeare. Since its creation, the CTP has played to more than 500,000 audience members across Canada and the U.S.

== History ==
Classical Theatre Project was founded in 2001 by David Galpern and Charles Roy. The company's first production was Romeo and Juliet, staged at the Poor Alex Theatre in the Annex neighbourhood of Toronto.

The company began producing full seasons of plays and workshops in 2004. In 2007, Classical Theatre Project was nominated for two Dora Mavor Moore Awards in the Theatre for Young Audiences category: Macbeth received a nomination for Outstanding Production and Jonathan Widdifield received a nomination for Outstanding Actor in Romeo and Juliet.

In 2006, the company moved into the Lower Ossington Theatre. The LOT was renovated in 2008 to house the company's first non-Shakespearean production, a Canadian adaptation of The Great Gatsby, directed by David Rotenberg, a Canadian acting teacher and novelist.

In January 2010, the company caused controversy when its U.S. production of Romeo and Juliet was considered too racy by some. The performance ultimately went on unchanged, while the incident provoked international discussion on the topic of cultural sensitivity and Shakespeare.

CTP was nominated for an additional two Dora Awards in 2010 for director Will O'Hare's production of Twelfth Night in the categories of Outstanding Production and Outstanding Performance (Ensemble) in the Theatre for Young Audiences category.

A year later, CTP was voted one of the ten best theatre production companies in Toronto by BlogTO.

In the fall of 2012, CTP launched its first U.S. tour of Adventures of Huckleberry Finn., which continued throughout 2013.

Since April 2012, CTP has worked out of the Toronto Centre for the Arts, presenting various Shakespeare productions in its 1,700-seat Main Stage Theatre. In 2013, the company continued to produce outside the works of Shakespeare and, along with NuMusical Productions, brought an all-Canadian production of Cats to the Panasonic Theatre in Toronto. That same year, the CTP presented its acclaimed ShakesBeer at Artscape Wychwood Barns, showing both The Complete Works of William Shakespeare (Abridged) and Twelfth Night. The company is currently co-producing a North American tour of Hair.

== 2013/2014 season ==
- Romeo & Juliet - by William Shakespeare, directed by Charles Roy
- Hamlet - by William Shakespeare, directed by Charles Roy
- Twelfth Night - by William Shakespeare, originally directed by Will O'Hare
- Macbeth - by William Shakespeare, directed by Charles Roy
- The Complete Works of Shakespeare (Abridged), directed by Charles Roy
- A Farewell to Arms - by Ernest Hemingway, directed by Charles Roy
- Hair - by James Rado & Gerome Ragni, Music by Galt MacDermot, directed by Charles Roy

== Past Productions ==
- Cats - based on the works of T. S. Eliot, music by Andrew Lloyd Webber, directed by Dave Campbell (2013)
- Adventures of Huckleberry Finn - by Mark Twain, directed by Charles Roy (2012/2013)
- Oedipus Rex - by Sophocles, directed by Charles Roy (2009/2010)
- The Great Gatsby - by F. Scott Fitzgerald, directed and adapted by David Rotenberg (2008/2009)

== Notable alumni ==
Christine Horne, Canadian theatre and film actor
David Reale, Canadian theatre and film actor

== Founders & Producers ==
Charles Roy co-founded CTP with David Galpern in 2001 and currently directs the majority of the plays for CTP. His productions have garnered Dora nominations and multiple U.S. tours. David Galpern has worked extensively in the entertainment industry as a producer, writer, actor, artistic director and fundraiser of both commercial and non-profit theatre companies.
