= K. C. Constantine =

American novelist (1934–2023)

- Born: Carl Constantine Kosak; 1934; McKees Rocks, Pennsylvania, U.S.
- Died: March 23, 2023 (aged 88); Greensburg, Pennsylvania, U.S.
- Occupation: Novelist
- Spouse: Linda J. Kosak
- Children: 1
- Writing career
- Genre: Crime fiction
- Notable work: Joey's Case

Carl Constantine Kosak (1934 – March 23, 2023), better known by the pen name K. C. Constantine, was an American mystery author.

Little is known about Kosak, as he preferred anonymity and gave only a few interviews. He was born in McKees Rocks, Pennsylvania, and served in the Marines in the early 1950s. He was an alumnus of Westminster College in New Wilmington, Pennsylvania, and claimed that he "flunked freshman composition twice" because he "did not know how to make an English sentence." (As reported in the bulletin of that college's "Friends of the Library" Autumn, 1990.) He lived in Greensburg, Pennsylvania, with wife Linda (they married in 1962) and continued after she died in 2018.

Other than that, the information is sketchy. He may have been a minor league baseball player (some had even been suggesting that Kosak was a pseudonym for former Major League baseball player Phil Rizzuto), and he may have studied at the University of Iowa's writers' program in the 1960s. Other evidence suggests he never got near a baseball and instead was a journalist at a western Pennsylvania newspaper.

Kosak continued to work a day job until 1993, when he lost his job and turned to writing full-time. He worked for several years as an English teacher at Seton Hill University (then Seton Hill College) in Greensburg, where he taught creative writing and composition until his refusal to complete his master's degree prompted his dismissal.

His most famous creation is Mario Balzic, police chief in fictional Rocksburg, Pennsylvania. Rocksburg is a by-product of Kosak's hometown, McKees Rocks, and the nearby cities Greensburg and Johnstown. Kosak is much more interested in the people in his novels than the actual mystery, and his later novels become ever more philosophical, threatening to leave the mystery/detective genre behind completely. In 1989, Constantine was nominated for the Edgar Allan Poe Award for Best Novel for the Mario Balzic novel Joey's Case. In 1999 Booklist ranked Blood Mud among the year's best crime novels, saying (along with Brushback), "Constantine has given us two more superb police procedurals and a wonderful opportunity to renew our acquaintance with one of the most memorable characters in contemporary crime fiction."

In May 2011, Kosak appeared in person for the first time at the 16th annual Festival of Mystery held at the Greek Orthodox Church in Oakmont, signing his books and giving a live interview.

Kosak died on March 23, 2023, at the age of 88. Mysterious Press announced they would be publishing a final novel—more than twenty years after his last publication—entitled Another Day's Pain.
