= Anna Cummer =

Canadian actress

- Born: January 2, 1977 (age 49); Singapore
- Occupation: Actress
- Years active: 2002–present

Anna Cummer (born January 2, 1977) is a Canadian actress. She was born in Singapore to Canadian parents. She spent half of her adolescence in Southeast Asia and the other half in Saskatoon, Saskatchewan, Canada. She finished high school in Hong Kong at the French International School of Hong Kong and studied drama in England where she completed the Master of Performing Arts. Since returning to Canada in 2001, Cummer has put her talents to good use as a voiceover artist, working in film and television, and performing in theatrical productions. As a voice actress, Cummer is best known as the voice of Strawberry Shortcake in Strawberry Shortcake's Berry Bitty Adventures, Mea from Popotan, Nozomi Daichi from The Daichis and Miyu Kuroi from the Mega Man NT Warrior series.

As a theatre actress, Cummer is a recipient of several Jessie nominations and awards.

She also voiced the English dub of Shinbi from The Haunted House animated series.

== Roles ==
=== Anime ===
- The Haunted House – Shinbi
- Cardfight!! Vanguard G: Stride Gate – Girl (ep 41); Ryuzu Child (ep 38); Ryuzu Myojin (Child)
- Cardfight!! Vanguard G: Z – Gredora
- Dokkoida?! – Mrs. Umeki; Assistant; Sister #4; Reporter
- Future Card Buddyfight X – Chibi Panda; Newscaster (ep 2)
- Galaxy Angel – Vanilla H
- Hamtaro – Postie
- Human Crossing – Kyoko Tamura; Miss Ryoko
- Infinite Ryvius – Fangirl; Dicastia Crewmember; Cafeteria Girl
- Inuyasha – Serina (Episode 59)
- Maison Ikkoku – Kozue Nanao (second voice); Yagami's Classmate 3
- Master Keaton – Ann MacRae
- MegaMan NT Warrior – Miyu Kuroi/Mysteriyu
- Mobile Suit Gundam SEED – Miriallia Haw
- Mobile Suit Gundam 00 – Kinue Crossroad
- Popotan – Mea (Ocean / Geneon)
- Starship Operators – Rio Mamiya
- Shakugan no Shana – Wirhelmina Carmel (Season 1)
- The Daichis - Earth's Defense Family – Nozomi Daichi; Lieutenant

=== Film and television ===
- Human Target – Female Hostage (Episode: The Pilot)
- Care Bears: Share Bear Shines – Princess Starglo (voice)
- Smallville – Passing Reporter (Episode: Hex)
- Strawberry Shortcake's Berry Bitty Adventures – Strawberry Shortcake (voice)
- Barbie Presents: Thumbelina – Thumbelina (voice)
- Reaper – Female Customer (Episode: The Favorite)
- Iron Man: Armored Adventures – Patricia "Pepper" Potts / Rescue (voice)
- Aliens in America – Mrs. Quercioli (Episode: The Muslim Card)
- Sheltered Life – Anna
- Eureka – EMT Nurse (Episode: God is in the Details)
- Monster Buster Club – Samantha (voice)
- Inuyasha the Movie: Fire on the Mystic Island - Kujaku
- My Little Pony: A Very Pony Place – Star Light & Heart Bright (voice)
- My Little Pony: Pinkie Pie's Special Day - Rainbow Dash (voice)
- The Barbie Diaries – Dawn (voice)
- Stargate Atlantis – Petra (Episode: The Tower)
- Just Cause – Julie (Episode: The Wives of Christmas Past)
- John Doe – Spectacles (Episode: Do, Re: Me)
- The World of Piwi — Maureen (1st voice)
- Frequency Zero – Waitress
- The Miracles of the Cards – Nurse Theresa
- Barbie: Princess Charm School – Caprice
- Hydee and the Hytops (2011 movie) - Charlotte (voice)
- The Passage of Fiona – Morgan

=== Theatre ===
- Hedda Gabler – Hedda (Osimous Theatre)
- Intimate Apparel – Mrs. Van Buren (Arts Club Theatre Company)
- Snowman – Kim (Rumble Productions)
- Death of a Salesman – Jenny/Letta (Vancouver Playhouse)
- The Miracle Worker – Annie Sullivan (Vancouver Playhouse)
- The Secret World of Og – Penny (Carousel Theatre)
- Coriolanus – Aufidius (Coriolanus Co-op)
- How It Works – Brooke (Touchstone Theatre – Nominated for Best Supporting Actress)
- Hecuba – Polyxena (Blackbird Theatre)
- Recovery – Mya (Rumble Productions)
- The Winter's Tale – Perdita (Bard on the Beach)
- Troilus and Cressida – Cassandra (Bard on the Beach)
- Titus Andronicus – Lavinia (Mad Duck Theatre Collective)
- Peter Pan – Wendy Darling (Carousel Theatre – Nominated for Outstanding Performance)
- The Diary of Anne Frank – Margot Frank (Arts Club Theatre Company)
- Portia, My Love – Portia (Ensemble Theatre)
- Goodnight Desdemona (Good Morning Juliet) – Juliet (One Night Castle Projects – Won Best Supporting Actress Award)
- The Tempest – Miranda (Mad Duck Theatre Collective)
- Shopping & Fucking – Lulu (Pi Theatre/Ruby Slippers)

=== Video games ===
- Dynasty Warriors: Gundam 2 – Cecily Fairchild
- Dynasty Warriors: Gundam 3 – Cecily Fairchild
