= Katrina Dunn =

Canadian actor, director and producer

- Born: British Columbia, Canada
- Education: Simon Fraser University; National Theatre School of Canada
- Occupations: theatre director, producer
- Years active: 1989 – present

Katrina Dunn (born in British Columbia, Canada) is an actor, director, and producer. She was the artistic director of Touchstone Theatre in Vancouver, British Columbia, Canada from 1997 to 2016.

== Career ==
=== Training and work ===
Dunn trained in dance at Simon Fraser University and at the National Theatre School of Canada. In 1989, Dunn co-founded Vancouver's Ruby Slippers Theatre and was its initial Artistic Director. Dunn left Ruby Slippers when she was appointed as Artistic Director of Touchstone Theatre in 1997. Under her direction, Touchstone has developed a focus on Canadian plays.

In 2003, Dunn co-founded the PuSh International Performing Arts Festival along with Norman Armour, a performing arts festival held every January in Vancouver.

Dunn served as an intern director for five months during the 2005 Shaw Festival. In addition to assisting other directors, Dunn was given the opportunity to direct a production of J.M. Synge's In the Shadow of the Glen.

Dunn was also an organizer of the Vancouver Wrecking Ball, a loose organization of theatre companies and artists advocating for the arts through cabarets featuring short plays and performances with strong political themes.

In addition to directing and producing, Dunn taught theatre at the University of British Columbia. Through Touchstone Theatre, she also teaches a course recognized by the Law Society of British Columbia on theatre techniques applicable to a legal practice. In 2011, Dunn began graduate work at the University of British Columbia. Her research focuses on the spatial aspects of theatre and on ecocritical theatre. She currently teaches in the theatre program at the University of Manitoba.

=== Awards ===
Dunn's work has garnered numerous nominations and awards. Over a number of years, she has been nominated multiple times for Jessie Richardson Theatre Awards in several categories. She has won twice for direction: in 2001 for Michael Healey's Kicked and in 2010 (as co-director) for Judith Thompson's Palace of the End. In 2010, Dunn was recognized by the Women's Caucus of the Playwrights Guild of Canada, who awarded her with its "Bra D'Or" (Golden Bra) for supporting and promoting the work of Canadian female playwrights.

== Representative work ==
Dunn has directed works for numerous theatre, dance and musical companies, such as Grinning Dragon Theatre, Battery Opera, Current Sound Opera(tions), The Hard Rubber Orchestra, and Mascall Dance. Dunn's work has included:.

- Age of Arousal, (Arts Club Theatre Company)
- A Christmas Story, director (Arts Club Theatre Company)
- Julius Caesar, director (Bard on the Beach)
- The Merchant of Venice, director (Bard on the Beach)
- Cymbeline, director (Bard on the Beach)
- The Caucasian Chalk Circle (Studio 58)
- At the Black Pig's Dyke (Studio 58)
- Unity (1918) (Touchstone Theatre)
- Kicked (Touchstone Theatre)
- Palace of the End (Touchstone Theatre/Felix Culpa/Horseshoes & Hand Grenades Theatre)
- In the Shadow of the Glen (Shaw Festival)
- Prodigal Son (Pacific Theatre)
- Brothel #9 (Touchstone Theatre)
- Pink Sugar (Solo Collective)
- PuSh International Performing Arts Festival, co-producer/co-curator
