= Mad Duck Theatre Collective =

Mad Duck Theatre Collective is a Vancouver, British Columbia based theatre company that has been presenting classical theatre for the modern stage.

Mad Duck in committed to exploring new and non traditional stagings, presenting women in non traditional roles and colorblind casting.

== Past productions ==
Member Projects between 2006 and 2009 have included William Shakespeare's Coriolanus and Shakespeare's R&J, based on the play by William Shakespeare. In 2001 and 2002, Non Equity Co-ops mounted productions of Not About Nightingales by Tennessee Williams and 7 Actors and a Dog do A Midsummer Night's Dream. Between 2003 and 2006, Equity Co-ops staged three Shakespeare plays: Titus Andronicus, Julius Caesar and The Tempest.

== Awards and nominations ==
=== Shakespeare's R&J ===
- Vancouver Courier Top Theatre Productions of 2006
- Vancouverplays.com - Play of the Month

Jessie Richardson Award Nominations:

- Outstanding Performance by a Supporting Actor - Josh Drebit
- Outstanding Direction - Jack Paterson

=== Titus Andronicus ===
- Vancouverplays.com - March Play of the Month Award
- The Ray Michal Award for Outstanding Body of Work by an Emerging Director 2006 - Jack Paterson

Jessie Richardson Theatre Awards Nominations:

- Outstanding Performance by an Actor in a Supporting Role - Jason Emanuel (Aaron)
- Outstanding Performance by an Actor in a Supporting Role - Mike Wasko (Lucius)
- Outstanding Performance by an Actress in a Supporting Role - Lesley Ewen (Markus)
- Outstanding Costume Design - Moira Fentum
- Outstanding Direction - Jack Paterson

=== Julius Caesar ===
Jessie Richardson Theatre Awards Nominations:

- Outstanding Performance by a Lead Actor - Craig Erickson (Antony)
- Outstanding Direction - Jack Paterson

=== The Tempest ===
Jessie Richardson Theatre Awards Nominations:

- Outstanding Performance by a Lead Actress - Gwynyth Walsh (Prospero)

== Women in Shakespeare ==
Non-traditional roles played by women in Mad Duck productions

Titus Andronius:

- Marcus Andronicus - Lesley Ewen
- Chiron - Laura Jaszcz
- Ǣmilius - Christina Schild

Julius Caesar:

- Soothsayer, Decius Brutus, Pindarus - Christina Schild
- Lucius, Cinna the Poet, Titinius - Samantha Jo Simmonds/ Kate Braidsworth
- Strato - Teryl Rothery
- Octavius - Robin Mooney

The Tempest:

- Prospero - Gwynyth Walsh
- Ariel (Shakespeare) - Jennifer Paterson
- Antonio - Carole Higgins
- Gonzallo - Pam Hyatt

A Midsummer Night's Dream:

- Quince - Anna Cummer
- Snout - Sarah Hattingh
