= Touchstone Theatre =

Theatre company based in Vancouver, BC

- Formation: 1976
- Type: Theatre group
- Location: Vancouver, British Columbia, Canada
- Artistic director: Lois Anderson
- Website: www.touchstonetheatre.com

Touchstone Theatre is a professional theatre company in Vancouver, British Columbia, Canada, founded in 1976 by a group of University of British Columbia theatre graduates. Touchstone's focus is on the development and production of work by Canadian Playwrights (newcomer, Indigenous, and settler). . Touchstone is currently under the artistic leadership of Lois Anderson (AD) and Libby Willoughby (GM/Producer). Former artistic directors are Ian Fenwick, Gordon McCall, John Cooper, Katrina Dunn, and Roy Surette.

== Activities ==
Touchstone Theatre's stated mandate is that it "develops and presents professional theatrical productions. We explore the contemporary Canadian play through content and form. We stimulate public interest in Canadian cultural perspectives."

In fulfillment of its mandate, much of Touchstone's activities have fallen into one of three categories: it mounts premiere productions of plays by British Columbian playwrights; it mounts second productions of important plays that premiered in other areas of Canada; and it produces works developed within the company. Touchstone has helped launch and develop the careers of numerous playwrights and actors. Touchstone, with the Playwrights Theatre Centre, also fosters the creation of new works through its "Flying Start" initiative (previously the "Playwright in Residence" program). Under the program, Touchstone spends two years working with a playwright to develop a play through workshops and dramaturgy to production.

Since 2011, in partnership with the Arts Club Theatre Company, Touchstone produces the "In Tune Conference", which supports new Canadian musicals in a national event which takes place every two years.

== History ==
As of its 40th anniversary in the 2015–2016 season, Touchstone will have produced 36 World Premiers and works by 42 Canadian playwrights. Touchstone has helped launch and develop the careers of numerous playwrights and actors.

At the start of the 1997–1998 season, Katrina Dunn succeeded Roy Surette as artistic director. Dunn created the "Playwright in Residence" program, which has resulted in many plays, including Kevin Kerr's Governor General's Awards-winning Unity (1918). In 2010, the Touchstone program focussed on female Canadian playwrights.

In 2003, Touchstone partnered with Rumble Productions to found the PuSh International Performing Arts Festival, a performing arts festival held every January in Vancouver, BC.

== Awards ==
Touchstone's body of work has garnered many awards and nominations, including numerous Jessie Awards. By the end of Touchstone's 38th season in 2014, Touchstone had earned 106 Jessie nominations and won 57 Jessie Awards.

In 2010, Artistic Director Katrina Dunn was recognized by the Women's Caucus of the Playwrights Guild of Canada, who awarded Dunn with its "Bra D'Or" for supporting and promoting the work of Canadian female playwrights.

== Chronology of plays ==
Touchstone Theatre had produced the following plays, some in partnership with other theatre companies.

- 1976/1977
  - The Exception & the Rule by Bertolt Brecht
  - The Farce of Pierre Patelin by Anonymous
  - King Stag by Carlo Gozzi
- 1977/1978
  - Faces in the Fast Lane A collective creation
  - Broken Dolls A collective creation
  - Gullband by Susan Musgrave
- 1978/1979
  - The Unseen Hand by Sam Shepard
  - Hot Rods & Heavy Water by Michael Puttonen
  - Angel City by Sam Shepard
- 1979/1980
  - HIGHBALL! by Ronald Weihs
- 1980/1981
  - Revenge by Howard Brenton
  - Games by Ivan Klima
- 1981/1982
  - The Man Himself by Alan Drury
  - The Crackwalker by Judith Thompson
- 1982/1983
  - The Wolf Boy by Brad Fraser
  - Clay by Lawrence Jeffery
- 1983/1984
  - Children of the Night by Paul Ledoux
  - Checkin’ Out by Kelly Rebar
- 1984/1985
  - Sex Tips for Modern Girls A collective creation
  - White Biting Dog by Judith Thompson
- 1985/1986
  - Going Down for the Count by Peter Eliot Weiss
  - El Crocodor A collective creation
  - Nancy Prew: Clue in the Fast Lane by Beverley Cooper
- 1986/1987
  - Life Skills by David King
  - Farther West by John Murrell
- 1987/1988
  - Red Channels by Jennifer Martin & Leslie Mildiner
  - Zaydok by Dennis Foon
  - Three Penny Opera by Bertolt Brecht & Kurt Weill
- 1988/1989
  - Bones by Peter Anderson
  - Toronto, Mississippi by Joan MacLeod
  - Jewel by Joan Macleod
  - Lost Souls & Missing Persons by Sally Clark
- 1989/1990
  - Where is Kabuki? by Don Druik
  - Homework & Curtains by John Lazarus
  - Local Colour by David King
- 1990/1991
  - The Invisible Detective by Peter Eliot Weiss with song by Ken MacDonald and Morris Panych
  - Unidentified Human Remains & The True Nature of Love by Brad Fraser
- 1991/1992
  - Lion in the Streets by Judith Thompson
  - A Map of Senses by Gordon Armstrong
- 1992/1993
  - The Number 14 A collective creation
  - The Hope Slide by Joan MacLeod
  - Iceberg Lettuce by Katherine Schlemmer
- 1993/1994
  - Whale Riding Weather by Bryden MacDonald
  - Lilies by Michel Marc Bouchard
  - WAK! by Sheri-D Wilson and Savannah Walling
- 1994/1995
  - The Visit by Friedrich Dürrenmatt
  - The Erotic Art Show by Kathryn Allison
- 1995/1996
  - When We Were Singing by Dorothy Dittrich
  - The Orphan Muses by Michel Marc Bouchard
- 1996/1997
  - Sex in Heaven by Gordon Armstrong
  - Sled by Judith Thompson
  - Boy Wonder (In partnership with Ballet British Columbia and Vancouver New Music)
- 1997/1998
  - The Weekend Healer by Bryden MacDonald
  - Grace by Michael Lewis MacLennan
- 1998/1999
  - The Good Person of Setzuan by Bertolt Brecht, Marguerite Steffin and Ruth Berlau
  - Passion by Conrad Alexandrowicz
  - Cherry Docs by David Gow
- 1999/2000
  - It's All True by Jason Sherman
  - Je me souviens by Lorena Gale
  - 15 Seconds by François Archambault
- 2000/2001
  - Kilt by Jonathan Wilson
  - Kicked by Michael Healey
  - Unity(1918) by Kevin Kerr
- 2001/2002
  - Sucker Falls by Drew Hayden Taylor
  - Emphysema by Janet Munsil
  - Hosanna by Michel Tremblay
- 2002/2003
  - Lisa Lisa by Rick Dobran
  - Apple by Vern Thiessen
  - The Family Way by Kathleen Oliver
- 2003/2004
  - Unity(1918) by Kevin Kerr
  - The League of Nathans by Jason Sherman
- 2004/2005
  - Strawberries in January by Evelyne de la Chenelière
  - The Trigger by Carmen Aguirre
- 2005/2006
  - Little Mercy's First Murder Book & lyrics by Morwyn Brebner, music by Jay Turvey and Paul Sportelli
  - Prodigal Son by Shawn Macdonald
- 2006/2007
  - Life After God by Michael Lewis MacLennan
  - Hippies and Bolsheviks by Amiel Gladstone
- 2007/2008
  - How It Works by Daniel MacIvor
  - The Dissemblers by Jason Bryden
  - Tideline by Wajdi Mouawad, translated by Shelley Tepperman
- 2008/2009
  - Age of Arousal by Linda Griffiths
  - East of Berlin by Hannah Moscovitch
  - Influence by Janet Munsil
  - Palace of the End by Judith Thompson
- 2009/2010
  - Any Night by Daniel Arnold, Medina Hahn and Ron Jenkins
  - Demon Night by Shawn Macdonald
  - Herr Beckmann's People by Sally Stubbs
- 2010/2011
  - Mimi (Or A Prisoner's Comedy) Lyrics and music by Allen Cole, book and lyrics by Melody Johnson and Rick Roberts
  - Hard Core Logo: Live Adaptation by Michael Scholar Jr., based on the book by Michael Turner, film by Bruce McDonald, and screenplay by Noel S. Baker. Original Music by Joe Keithley, lyrics by Michael Turner
  - Love Songs By Ana Sokolovic
- 2011/2012
  - Almighty Voice and His Wife by Daniel David Moses
  - Goodness by Michael Redhill
  - Shelter from the Storm by Peter Boychuk
  - True Love Lies by Brad Fraser
- 2012/2013
  - Dancing With Rage by Mary Walsh
  - Eternal Hydra by Anton Piatigorsky
  - Haunted by Daniel Karasik
  - In Tune Conference
- 2013/2014
  - Hirsh Created by Alon Nashman and Paul Thompson
  - Night by Christopher Morris
  - The Concessions by Briana Brown
  - The Romeo Initiative by Trina Davies
- 2014/2015
  - In Tune 2015
  - Late Company by Jordan Tannahill
  - The Road Forward Created by Marie Clements
- 2019/20
  - Certified by Jan Derbyshire
