= Carousel Theatre =

Professional theatre company for young audiences in Canada

- Carousel Theatre's administrative offices on Granville Island, Vancouver
- Formation: 1974
- Type: Theatre group
- Location: Vancouver, British Columbia, Canada
- Artistic director: Not available
- Website: http://www.carouseltheatre.ca

Carousel Theatre (also known as Carousel Theatre For Young People) is a professional theatre company for young audiences located in Vancouver, British Columbia, Canada. The company stages plays for young people, families and educators at the Waterfront Theatre and Performance Works on Granville Island and tours to elementary schools across British Columbia and Canada. It was also the first Canadian theatre company to offer signing during its performances for the hearing impaired. Carousel Theatre is a member of PACT, the Professional Association of Canadian Theatres.

== History and productions ==
Carousel was founded in 1974 by Elizabeth Ball, who served as Artistic Director until 2001, when she stepped down and was replaced by Chris McGregor, who departed in 2006, and Carole Higgins until her departure from the company in July 2020. Currently, the company is under significant artistic leadership changes and board reform. In its early years, Carousel garnered attention for its adaptations of Shakespeare in modern dress. Later, it shifted its focus to adaptations of classical stories and new works by Canadian playwrights. Carousel first mounted its productions in Vancouver playhouses such as the Arts Club Theatre Company's old Seymour Street theatre and the Vancouver East Cultural Centre. In about 1993, it relocated to Granville Island, where it has administrative offices and three rehearsal halls. Its administrative and rehearsal space is located across the street from the Waterfront Theatre, which Carousel helped to build and is where it mounts many of its productions. When Higgins took over as Artistic Director, Carousel Theatre rebranded itself as Carousel Theatre for Young People, in order to signify its focus on children and youth.

Carousel has mounted premieres of several productions, some of which it had commissioned and developed. Currently, a typical mainstage season for Carousel consists of four or five productions. It offers public performances on weekends and matinees, primarily for schools, during the week.

Canadian plays that premiered at Carousel Theatre include A Christmas Carol - The Musical by Mavor Moore (in 1998), Dying to be Thin by Linda A. Carson (in 1992), and Basically Good Kids by Mark Leiren-Young (in 1993). Carousel also mounted an original production of Pierre Berton's fable The Secret World of Og, adapted under commission by Governor General's Award-winning playwright Kevin Kerr. Other Carousel productions have included Seussical and Kim Selody's adaptation of The Hobbit. Many Canadian theatre artists, including Roy Surette, and Anna Cummer have worked for Carousel Theatre in the decades since it was founded.

In July 2020, following a petition alleging the theatre company had a toxic workplace, Carousel Theatre parted ways with longtime Artistic Director Carole Higgins.

== Other activities ==
In addition to producing and staging theatrical performances, Carousel operates a theatre school for young people from the ages of 3 to 17 years old. The company also operates a "Teen Shakespeare Program" for young people aged 13 to 17 during the months of July and August, culminating in a production staged by the teen actors.

== Awards ==
Carousel Theatre and its artists have been honoured with a number of awards.

=== "Jessie" Awards ===
Over the years, Carousel theatre received numerous Jessie Richardson Theatre Awards and nominations, including:

- 2011
  - Outstanding Design, Theatre for Young Audiences - Heidi Wilkinson, Bird Brain
  - Outstanding Artistic Creation, Theatre for Young Audiences – Carole Higgins, Bird Brain
  - Outstanding Production, Theatre for Young Audiences, Bird Brain
  - Significant Artistic Achievement, Theatre for Young Audiences, Design Team, Pharaoh Serket & The Lost Stone of Fire
- 2010
  - Outstanding Production, Theatre for Young Audiences, A Year with Frog & Toad
  - Outstanding Performance, Theatre for Young Audiences, A Year with Frog & Toad
  - Outstanding Design, Theatre for Young Audiences - Heidi Wilkinson
  - Outstanding Artistic Creation, Theatre for Young Audiences - Gordon Roberts (Musical Direction) A Year with Frog & Toad
- 2008
  - Outstanding Production, Theatre for Young Audiences, Seussical (awarded with the Canada Council Prize for Outstanding Production, Theatre for Young Audiences)
- Outstanding Artistic Creation, Theatre for Young Audiences - Steven Greenfield, Musical Direction, Seussical
- Outstanding Performance, Theatre for Young Audiences - Allan Zinyk, Seussical
- 2007
  - Outstanding Production, Theatre for Young Audiences, The Odyssey (awarded with the Canada Council Prize for Outstanding Production, Theatre for Young Audiences)
- 2006
  - Carole Higgins, Outstanding Artistic Creation (direction), The Big League
  - Alexa Dubreuil, Josh Dickson, Nathan Schwartz, Chris Van Hyfte, Significant Artistic Achievement (acting ensemble), The Big League
