= Julia Anastasopoulos =

South African artist

- Born: 14 June 1983 (age 43); Johannesburg, Gauteng, South Africa
- Other names: SuzelleDIY, Tali
- Occupations: Actress, illustrator, designer
- Awards: Eskom Energy Efficient Lighting Design Competition; South Africa's favourite Online Celebrity
- Website: SuzelleDIY

Julia Anastasopoulos (born 14 June 1983) is a South African artist, illustrator, designer and actress. Anastasopoulos became a local internet phenomenon in May 2014, with her do-it-yourself web series known as SuzelleDIY. Before she became a YouTube personality, Anastasopoulos created hand-drawn illustrations on the walls and windows of a few MyCiTi bus stations.

Julia recently started her own show "Ridiculousness with Suzelle DIY" on Comedy Central where she features with many guests including Amore and Francois van Coke.

== Early life ==
Born in Johannesburg in 1983, according to Anastasopoulos, "My mom is an art teacher and always encouraged me and my sisters to make things and express ourselves creatively. I was always inspired by picture books and illustrators like Quentin Blake, Saul Steinberg and Raymond Peynet". She studied Theatre and Performance at the University of Cape Town.

== Education ==
From 2001 to 2004, she obtained her BA in Theatre and Performance majoring in Acting at the University of Cape Town.

== Career ==
Anastasopoulos took part in stage productions at the University of Cape Town. In 2004, she took part in The Blue Room, a theatre production directed by Jacqui Singer and written by David Hare at the Arena Theatre. Two years later, in 2006, she played Ophelia in a Hamlet theatre production directed by Roy Sargaent in the Artscape Theatre.

In 2008, Anastasopoulos designed a Peg Light and received an award for Eskom's Energy Efficient Lighting Design Competition under Category B: Residential luminaire design for professionals. Anastasopolous designs sets for theatre productions, in 2008 she designed Magnet Theatre's Every Year, Every Day, I Am Walking production.

In 2010 she appeared in Interrupting Henry, a play directed by Matthew Wild at The Artscape Arena, Anastasopoulos played the part of an Afrikaans teacher named Elsa Brown. She took part in the theatre production of Done London which was written by Nicholas Spagnoletti at the Kalk Bay Theatre in Cape Town. A short video clip of the play can be viewed on YouTube. In 2011 she played as Helena in a production of A Midsummer Night's Dream, directed by Guy Delancey.

Anastasopoulos uses several mediums to create illustrations. Such mediums include murals, children's books, shopping bags and an editorial cover for a magazine. Her illustrations have been captured on her professional website. She was commissioned to design a mural for display in The Book Lounge in Cape Town for the children's book section. It displays a city landscape which was drawn on the wall and then painted with acrylic paints. She illustrated a children's book with Emily Child, Jeff and George and the Totem Pole.

In March 2013, she took part in the design of Fugard Studio's theatre production of Master Harold ... and the Boys produced by Eric Abraham and directed by Kim Kerfoot. She later created illustrations for TREE/BOOM/UMTHI, a 30-minute narrative played in the Magnet Theatre in 2013 for children between ages 3 and 7. During the Grahamstown National Arts Festival in 2013, she designed the set for Vigil, written by Canadian playwright Morris Panych.

Anastasopoulos started her SuzelleDIY YouTube channel in May 2014, with a "bite-size, do-it-yourself web series". She plays an Afrikaans woman, along with animator and filmmaker Ari Kruger. In 2014 she received an award for South Africa's favourite Online Celebrities from Channel24. Suzelle collaborated with Takealot, an online retailer and created four videos for the Takealot brand.

In 2015, Suzelle took first place in the Superbalist 100 campaign.
