= Girl in the Goldfish Bowl =

Play written by Morris Panych

- Original language: English
- Written by: Morris Panych
- Characters: Iris, Sylvia, Owen, Mr. Lawrence, Miss Rose
- Genre: Drama

Premiere
- Place: Arts Club Theatre Company, Vancouver, B.C.

Girl in the Goldfish Bowl is a 2003 Governor General's Award-winning play by Canadian playwright Morris Panych.

Set in Steveston, British Columbia in 1962, it tells the story of a young girl named Iris who believes that the world has been held together by her pet goldfish and that his death has led both to the disintegration of her parents' marriage and the Cuban Missile Crisis. Almost immediately after her pet's death, Iris finds a man washed up on the beach and thinks he is the reincarnation of the goldfish. She brings the stranger back to her home, pinning all her messianic hopes on his well-being.

Reviewer Christopher Houle described the play as a cross between Kirsten Thomson's "I, Claudia" and the 1979 film Being There.

In his review of the 2005 production at the Crucible Theatre in Sheffield, Alfred Hickling wrote that the play seems to reinforce the stereotype that "Canadians are incapable of doing anything dramatic".

== Awards ==
- 2002 Jessie Richardson Award for Outstanding Original Play or Musical: Large Theatre
- 2003 Dora Mavor Moore Award General Theatre: Outstanding New Play
- 2004 Governor General's Award for English-language Drama
