= Norman Armour (director) =

Canadian theatre director (1959–2023)

Norman Armour (1959–2023) was a Canadian theatre director and actor in Vancouver. He co-founded the PuSh International Performing Arts Festival. His career was honoured with "37 Jessie Richardson Award nominations, SFU’s Distinguished Alumni in Arts award commendation, City of Vancouver Civic Merit Award, Queen Elizabeth II Diamond Jubilee Medal, Vancouver Mayor’s Arts Award, and an Honorary Doctorate of Letters from his alma mater, where he taught creative entrepreneurship." Obituaries called him a "passionate and visionary leader who shaped the arts community in Vancouver building connections between artists, presenters and arts organizations worldwide."
