= MyCiTi bus stations =

Stations for the MyCiTi bus lines in greater Cape Town

MyCiTi bus stations host the MyCiTi bus lines that travel throughout the greater Cape Town area.

== History ==
In 2007 Cape Town began its work on the MyCiTi Integrated Rapid Transit (IRT) system to improve public transport in the city. The plan enforces an integration between modes of public transportation since both rail and bus routes are used by thousands on their daily commute. The work includes improvements in infrastructure, business development, and operations. In October 2010, the IRT project began to seek artists and designers to create artworks on thirteen of the new MyCiTi bus stations. The plan called for artwork to be presented on the glass panels at the entrance of the stations. Six of the thirteen stations were commissioned to an artist collective called Black hat and Nimbus. Black hat and Nimbus are a collaborative group composed of Mark Henning and Hannah Williams, two graphic designers who have worked together on both public and private creative projects. Other artists involved in the project included Julia Anastasopoulos for Civic Centre mural, Hannes Bernard (Paarden Island), Arlene Amaler-Raviv (Neptune street), David Hlongwane (Section street), Sanjin Muftic (Brooklyn), Tony Coetzee (Zoarvlei) and Alan Munro (Bayside).

A ZAR1-million competition for public artwork was held in Long Street in 2014 by the Western Cape Government Public Art Competition which was followed by Creative Week's public art walking tour. Part of this tour included vinyl artwork by Julia Anastasopoulos on the MyCiti bus station in Thibault Square.

=== Artist's statement ===
"In our increasingly complex world, design has become an indispensable interface between us, our environment and our technology. Visual symbols and information systems govern things as simple as choosing the right size trousers, to as complex as finding your way around an unfamiliar city. Public visual information systems influence the way people interact with their environment and bridge the gaps between conceptual and physical spaces. Although most public visual information exists as part of discreet formal systems with a very practical purpose (such as traffic signals, maps or signage), as a medium it has the potential to be used within a broader conceptual context and provide multiple layers of 'meta data' to any space, and this is where the boundaries between design and art begin to become less distinct."

== Woodbridge Island ==
The artwork at the Woodbridge Island MyCiTi station, entitled Shared Celebrations, consists of vinyl panels covered in colorful circles that graphically represent how many people in the area were born on each day of the year. The size and color of the circle determine how many people were born that day as well as the probable conceptions. The idea behind this design was to connect commuters to the community, through something shared such as birthdays, a personal day of celebration most people acknowledge. One could look that day to see how many local people are celebrating their birthday, or see how many share their birthday. The inspiration behind the design was influenced by party favors once received as children at birthday parties, that often had similar cheerful and colorful patterns.

== Racecourse Road ==
When My Ship Comes In, the artwork found at the Milnerton MyCiTi station, plays on the ideas of luck and superstition. The graphic design is meant to depicts the number of lotto winnings relative to the number of ships coming in to Cape Town harbour. The idea comes from the English saying. The artists thought a topic related to gambling would be appropriate because of the bus station's close location to the old Milnerton racecourse. The graph shows a wave-like pattern, representing ships entering the harbour, that collides with bright yellow circles, that vary in size to show the number of lottery wins. The data covers monthly lotto wins and ships entering the harbour from 2007 to 2010. The data was taken from the National Lottery and Transnet.

While researching for this art piece, Henning and Williams faced some problems using certain information. Finding and obtaining the data was simple, however the Western Cape Gamling and Racing Board found the public display of gambling statistics to be a form advertising, and therefore it could not be used. Another idea was to display the number of black cats that have been lost in the area but the SPCA lacked the information and feared it would discourage people from adopting black cats.

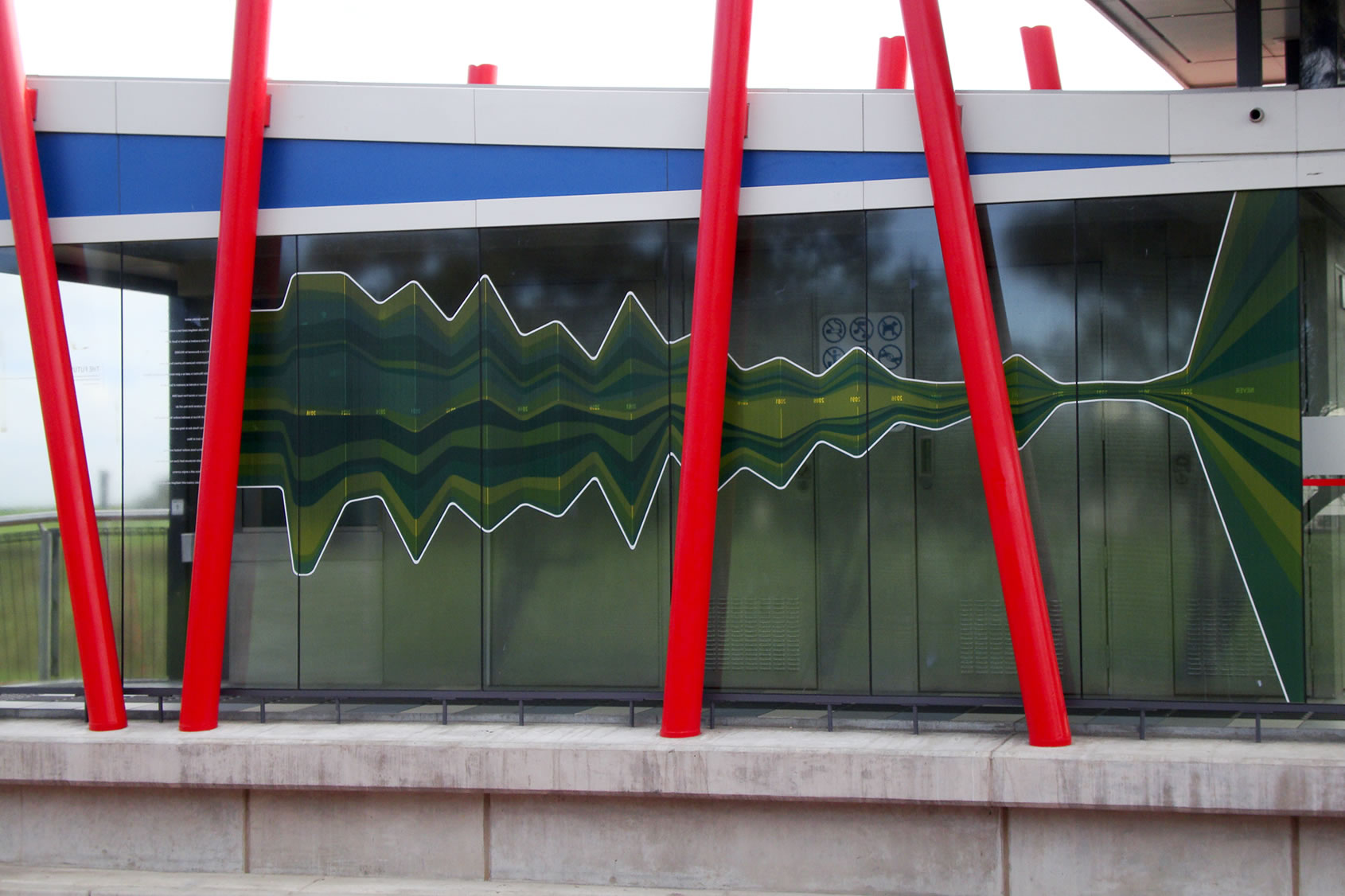
Milnerton

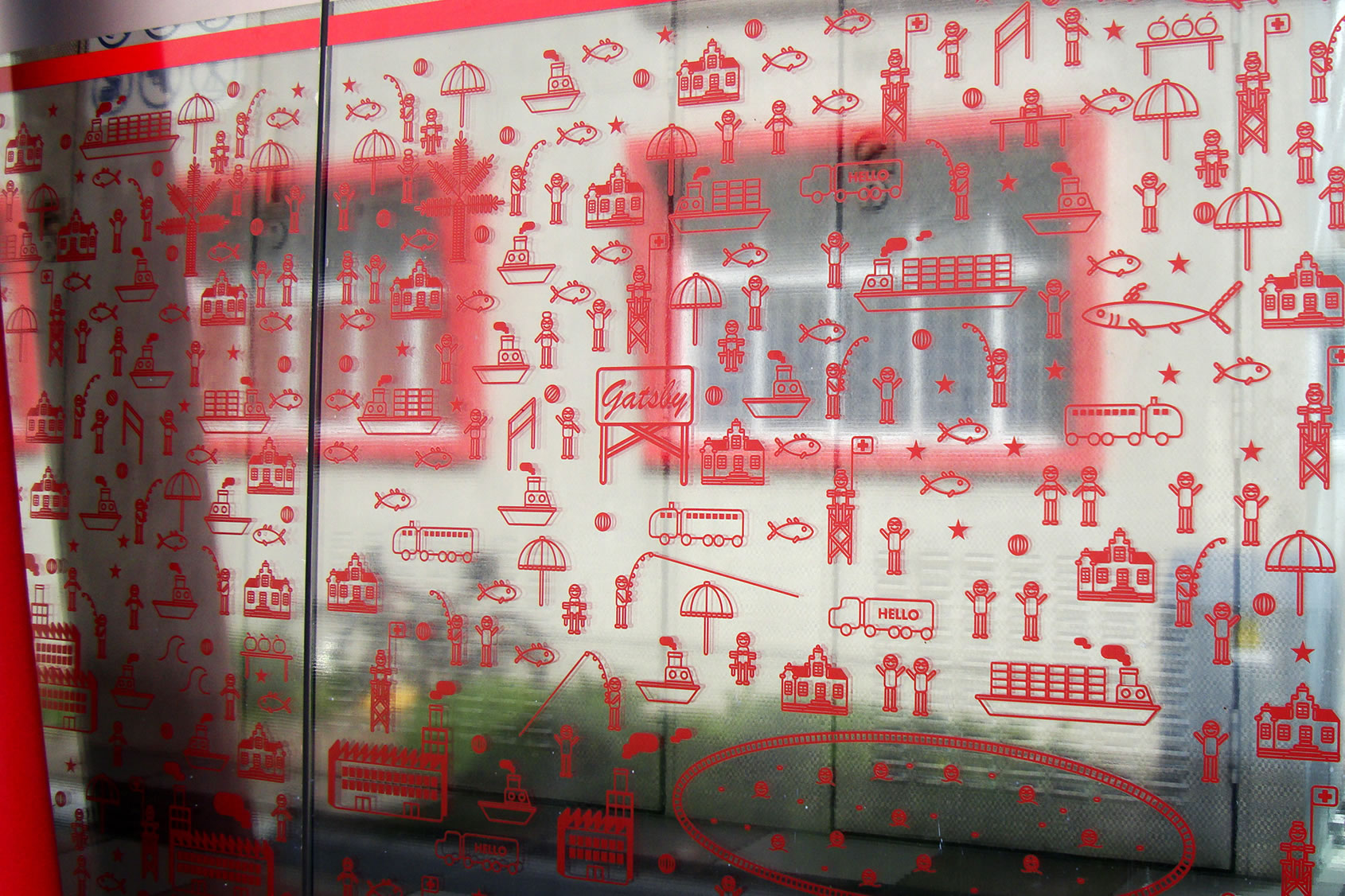
Paarden Eiland

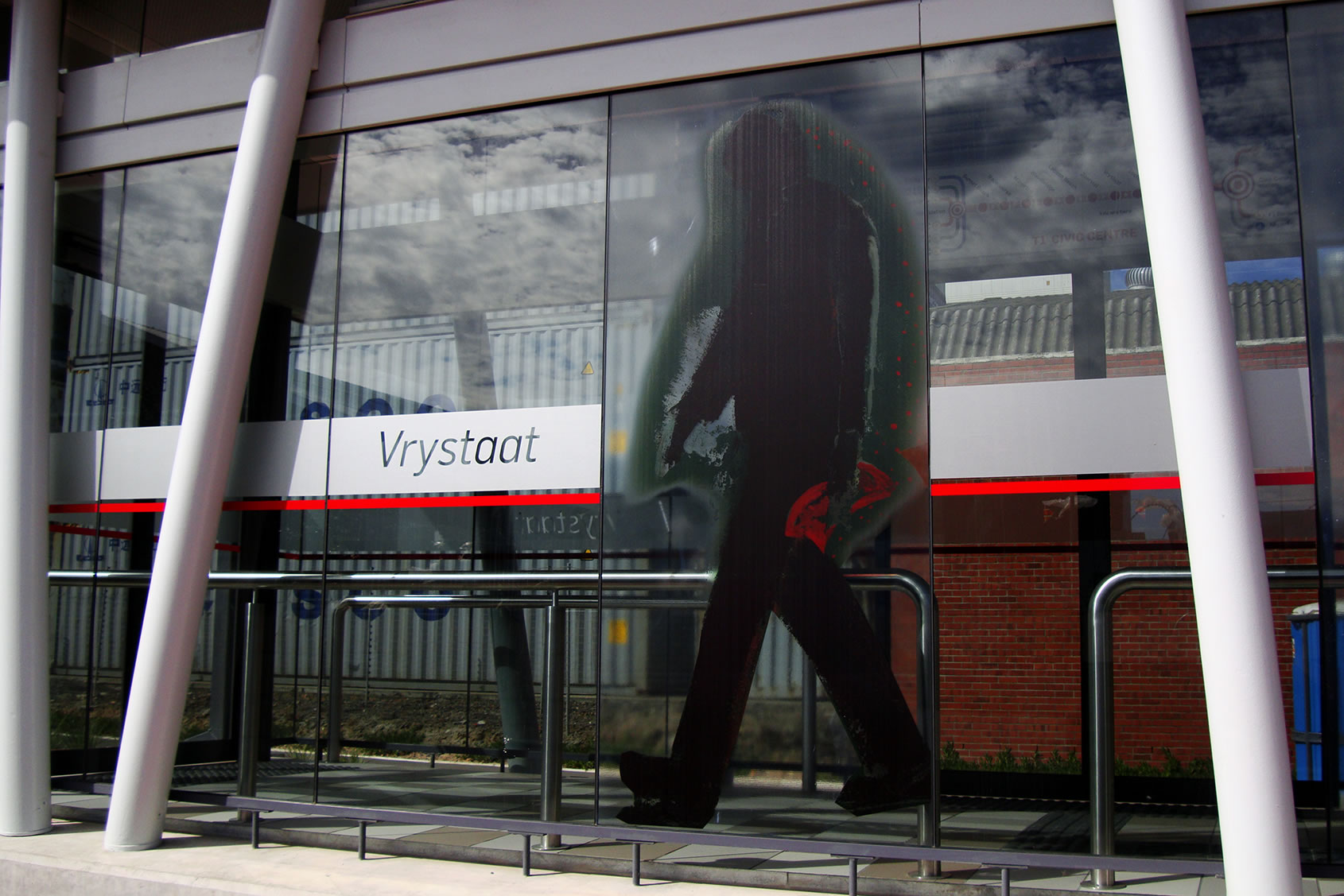
Vrystaat

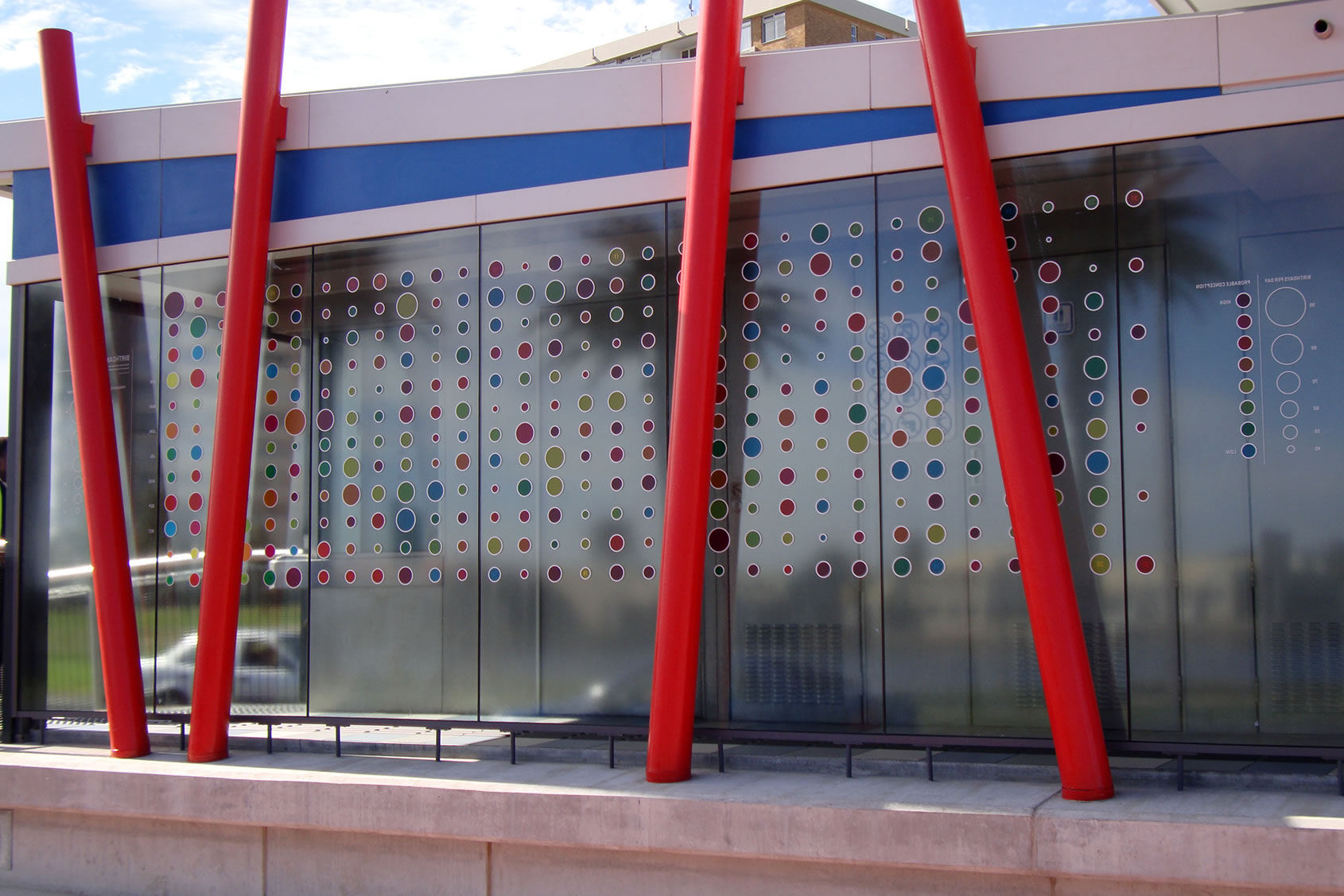
Woodbridge Island

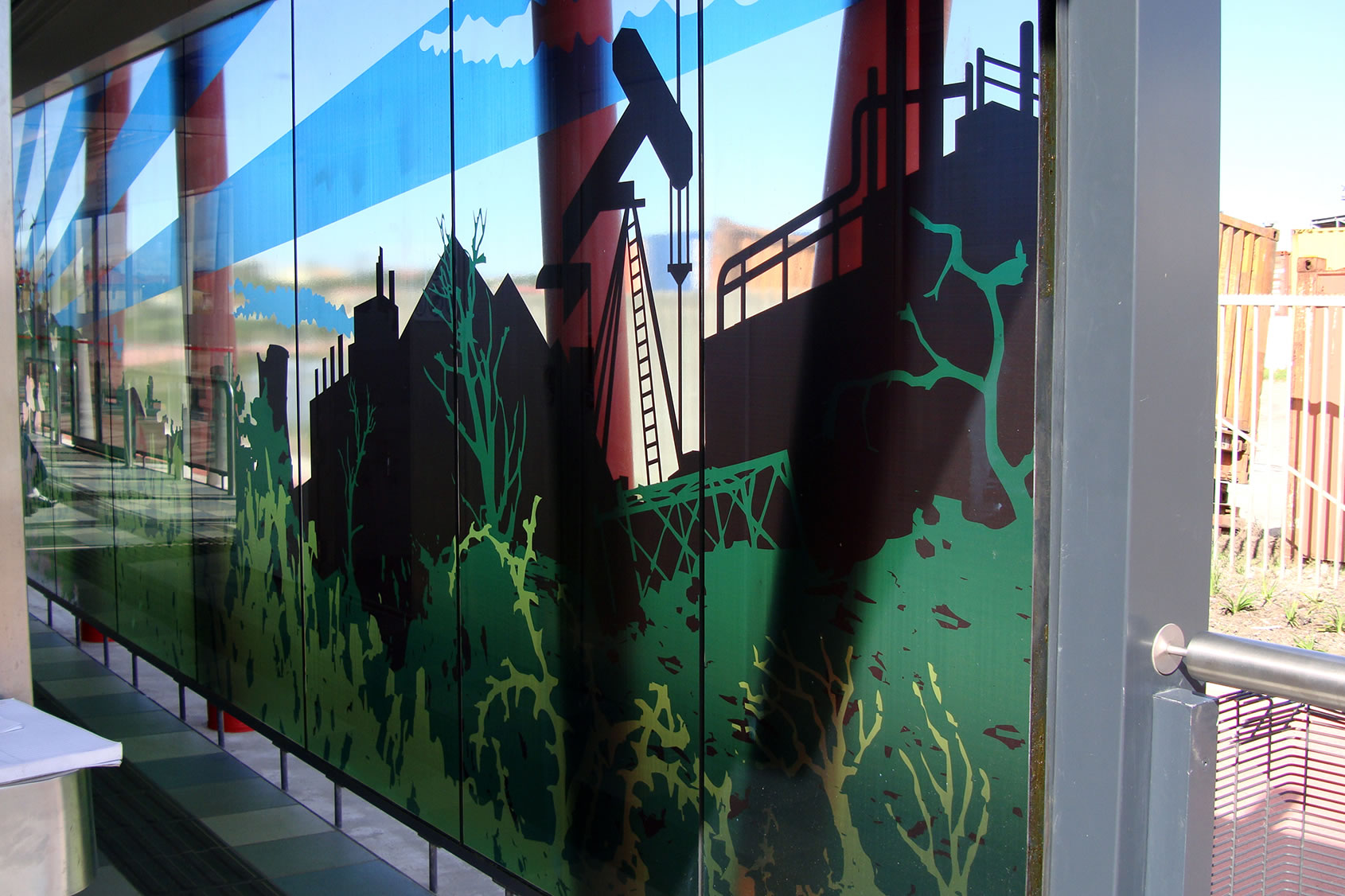
Zoarvlei

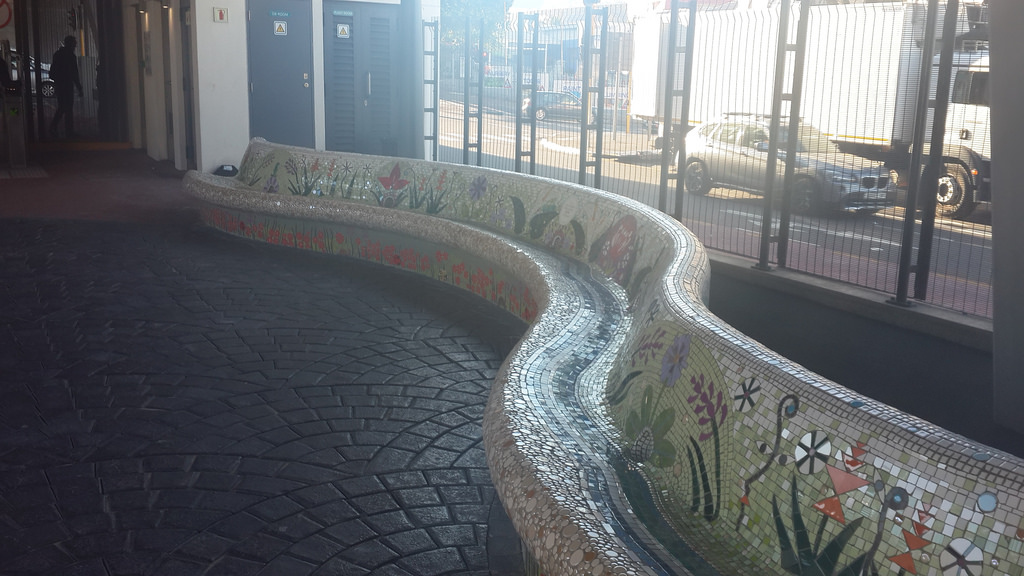
Gardens Station - bench, following designs of Gaudi

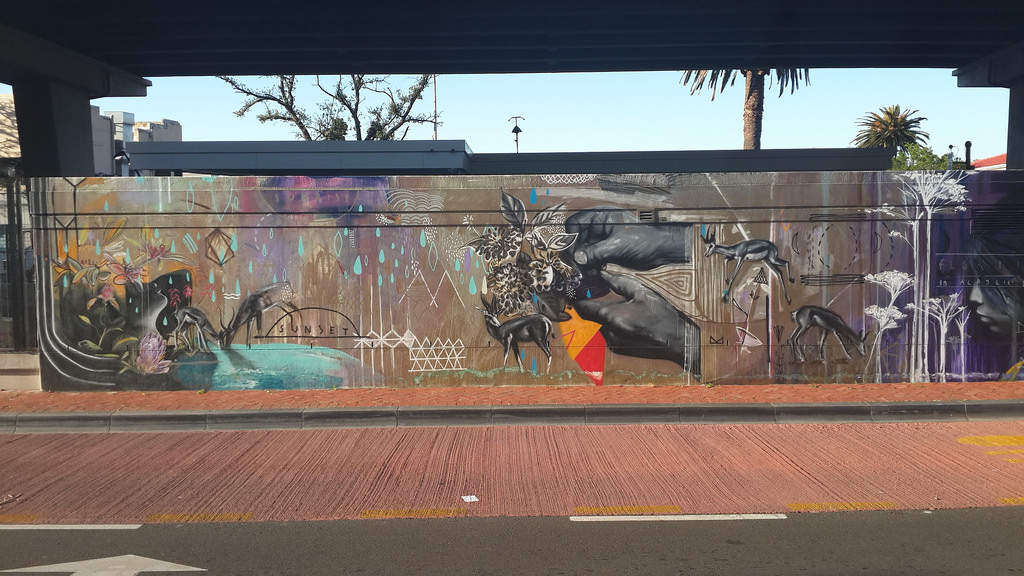
Gardens Station
