= The Ends of the Earth (play) =

Play by Morris Panych

- Original language: English
- Written by: Morris Panych
- Subject: Paranoia, synchronicity
- Genre: Comedy/fantasy
- Setting: Numerous locations across an unspecified country

Premiere
- Date: September 1992
- Place: Arts Club Theatre, Vancouver, British Columbia, Canada

The Ends of the Earth is a 1992 play by the Canadian playwright Morris Panych. It tells the story of two men, Frank and Walker, each of whom is convinced that the other is following him. Despite their best efforts at running away from each other, the two men repeatedly find themselves in the same places.

The Ends of the Earth premiered at the Arts Club Theatre in Vancouver in 1992, in a production directed by Panych, starring Alec Willows and Earl Pastko as Frank and Walker. Later that year it was performed at the Tarragon Theatre in Toronto, with Stephen Ouimette and Keith Knight in the lead roles, and Panych again directing.

== Awards ==
The Ends of the Earth won the 1994 Governor General's Literary Award for English-language drama.
