= PuSh International Performing Arts Festival =

- Location: Vancouver, Canada
- Founded: 2003 as a series, 2005 as a festival
- Founded by: Katrina Dunn, Norman Armour
- Type of plays: Multidisciplinary (theatre, dance, multimedia, music, film, circus)
- Festival date: January–February
- Website: http://pushfestival.ca/

The PuSh International Performing Arts Festival is produced over three weeks each winter on the unceded and traditional territories of the xʷməθkʷəy̓əm, Sḵwx̱wú7mesh, and səlilwətaɬ first nations, primarily in the territory that was the seasonal and ancestral village of K’emk’emeláy, colloquially known as Vancouver, British Columbia.

The Festival, held in the lower mainland every January and February, remains a place for artists to present their projects to an international audience and for new, innovative work to emerge.

The Festival showcases international, Canadian and local artists. It was co-founded in 2003 by Katrina Dunn and Norman Armour, and registered as a charitable organization in 2005.

== Administration ==
PuSh has a collaborative leadership team: Gabrielle Martin is the Artistic Director and Annie Clarke is the Managing Director. Full Festival staff is listed on their website.

== Past Festivals ==
=== 2003 Foundation ===
The PuSh Festival was co-founded in 2003 by Katrina Dunn of Touchstone Theatre and Norman Armour of Rumble Productions.

=== 2005 PuSh Festival ===
In 2005, the organization of the Festival was formalized with the creation of a formal board of directors and advisors and by being registered as a charitable organization.

There were 9 productions included in the inaugural 2005 PuSh International Performing Arts Festival:

The Bacchae - an electronic opera	Screaming Weenie Production	Vancouver, CA
Crime and Punishment	Neworld Theatre	Vancouver, CA
The Empty Orchestra	Theatre Replacement	Vancouver, CA
Dances for a Small Stage IX	MovEnt	Vancouver, CA
The Trigger	Touchstone Theatre	Vancouver, CA
Final Viewing	Radix Theatre	Vancouver, CA
Frank	Nigel Charnock + Company	London, UK
Say Nothing	Ridiculusmus	London, UK
The Black Rider: The Casting of the Magic Bullets	November Theatre	Edmonton, CA

=== 2006 PuSh Festival ===
There were 14 productions included in the 2006 PuSh International Performing Arts Festival:

The Perfectionist	Boca del Lupo	Vancouver
Sexual Practices of the Japanese	Theatre Replacement	Vancouver
Nunavut	Kronos Quartet with Tanya Tagaq	San Francisco, USA/Bilbao, Spain
Famous Puppet Death Scenes	The Old Trout Puppet Workshop	Calgary, CA
Tempting Providence	Theatre Newfoundland Labrador	Corner Brook, CA
Compilation	Lynda Gaudreau/Compagnie De Brune	Montreal, CA
5AM (5 Heures du matin)	Pigeons International	Montreal, CA
Dances for a Small Stage XII	MovEnt	Vancouver, CA
Dreams	Eye of Newt	Vancouver, CA
Studies in Motion: The Hauntings of Eadweard Muybridge	Electric Company Theatre	Vancouver, CA
Thom Pain (based on nothing)	Western Theatre Conspiracy	Vancouver, CA
Absence and Presence	Andrew Dawson	London, UK
Sisters, Such Devoted Sisters	Out of Joint	London, UK
Six Miniature Tragedies	Jean-Paul Wenzel	Paris, FR

=== 2007 PuSh Festival ===
There were 25 productions at the 2007 PuSh International Performing Arts Festival:

Skydive	Realwheels	Vancouver, CA
Bioboxes: Artifacting Human Experience	Theatre Replacement	Vancouver, CA
Copper Thunderbird	urban ink/National Arts Centre	Vancouver, CA/Ottawa, CA
Brutalis	Dame de Pic/Karine Ponties	Brussels, Belgium
Aalst	Victoria	Ghent, Belgium
Famous Puppet Death Scenes	The Old Trout Puppet Workshop	Calgary, CA
Revisited	2b theatre company	Halifax, CA
Attack #15	L'Action Terroriste Socialement Acceptable	Montreal, CA
Howie le Rookie	Théâtre de la Manufacture	Montreal, CA
Dances for a Small Stage 15	MovEnt	Vancouver, CA
Projections	CABINET Interdisciplinary Collaborations	Vancouver, CA
La belle et la bête (Beauty and the Beast)	Eye of Newt	Vancouver, CA
Symphony at the Roundhouse: All the World's a Stage	Vancouver Symphony	Vancouver, CA
this riot life and Field Study	Veda Hille	Vancouver, CA
Beggars Would Ride	Wild Excursions Performance	Vancouver, CA
Rage	Green Thumb Theatre	Vancouver, CA
Killing Caesar	Rubicon Collective	Vancouver, CA
dog eat dog	The Only Animal	Vancouver, CA
Occupation 1: The Molecules/Michael Vincent	Western Front	Vancouver, CA/New York, USA/Oakland, USA
my arm	News from Nowhere Theatre/Tim Crouch	Brighton, UK
an oak tree	News from Nowhere Theatre/Tim Crouch	Brighton, UK
Scarface	Eddie Ladd	Cardiff, UK
Exquisite Pain	Forced Entertainment	Sheffield, UK
Quizoola!	Forced Entertainment	Sheffield, UK
Sonata for Violin and Turntables	Daniel Bernard Roumain w/ DJ Scientific	New York, USA

=== 2008 PuSh Festival ===
The 2008 PuSh Festival had over 23,000 attendees. Visiting presenters from across Canada and around the world were in attendance for the PuSh Assembly networking event to view performances, network, and experience the Festival.

There were productions at the 2008 PuSh International Performing Arts Festival:

Haircuts by Children	Mammalian Diving Reflex	Toronto, CA
small metal objects	Back to Back Theatre	Geelong, AU
Dual Eclipse: Orchestras of Two Worlds	Turning Point Ensemble/Gamelan Gita Asmara	Vancouver, CA
My Dad, My Dog	Boca del Lupo	Vancouver, CA
Clark and I Somewhere in Connecticut	Rumble Productions/Theatre Replacement	Vancouver, CA
My Name Is Rachel Corrie	neworldtheatre/Teesri Duniya Theatre	Vancouver, CA/Montreal, CA
No Holds Bar	South Asian Arts	Vancouver, CA/San Francisco, USA/Seattle, USA
The Misfit	South Asian Arts/Pull' it Out Theatre	Vancouver, CA/Toronto, CA
46 Circus Acts in 45 Minutes	Circa	Brisbane, AU
The Space Between	Circa	Brisbane, AU
The Four Horsemen Project	Volcano	Toronto, CA
Dances for a Small Stage 18	MovEnt	Vancouver, CA
The General	Eye of Newt	Vancouver, CA
Faun Fables	Western Front Society	Vancouver, CA
Palace Grand	Electric Company	Vancouver, CA
Old Goriot	Western Gold Theatre/Theatre at UBC	Vancouver, CA
Août-un repas à la campagne	Théâtre la Seizième/A Théâtre de la Manufacture	Vancouver, CA/Montreal, CA
fever: Shakespeare Sonnets in Voice, Dance and Music	Nigel Charnock, Michael Riessler, Virus String Quartet	UK/Germany
Hey Girl!	Socìetas Raffaello Sanzio	Cesena, IT
Instructions for Modern Living	Duncan Sarkies and Nic McGowan	Wellington, NZ
Glow	Chunky Move	Melbourne, AU
Frankenstein	Catalyst Theatre	Edmonton, CA
The Black Rider: The Casting of the Magic Bullets	November Theatre	Edmonton, CA/Vancouver, CA

=== 2009 PuSh Festival ===
The 2009 PuSh Festival took place from January 20 to February 8, and offered works from across Canada, England, Japan and New Zealand. A total of 136 performances took place at 16 venues across the city and the attendance was more than 24,000.

There were 40 productions in the 2009 PuSh International Performing Arts Festival:

The Children's Choice Awards starring The Jury from Surrey	Mammalian Diving Reflex	Toronto, CA
That Night Follows Day	Theatre Replacement	Vancouver, CA
Skydive	Realwheels	Vancouver, CA
The Be(A)st of Taylor Mac	Taylor Mac	
Transmission of the Invisible	Tribal Crackling Wind	Toronto, CA
Nanay: A testimonial play	Urban Crawl/neworld theatre/Philippine Women Centre of BC	Vancouver, CA
while going to a condition + Accumulated Layout	S20/Hiroaki Umeda	Tokyo, JP
Five Days in March	chelfitsch Theatre Company	Tokyo, JP
nikamon ohci askiy (song land for/from/of the)	Cheryl L'Hirondelle	Vancouver, CA
The Invisible	Infrarouge	Montreal, CA
Billy Twinkle, Requeim for a Golden Boy	Ronnie Burkett Theatre of Marionettes	Toronto, CA
Dances for a Small Stage 20	MovEnt	Vancouver, CA
Live from a Bush of Ghosts	Theatre Conspiracy	Vancouver, CA
Steve Reich's Drumming	Music on Main	Vancouver, CA
Assembly	Radix	Vancouver, CA
Trampoline Hall		
Conspiracy Playlist by DJ Buffalo Tim		
Robin Holcomb and Peggy Lee		
Twenty-Minute Musicals	Veda Hille & Geoff Berner	
Invisible Atom	2b theatre	
ENGLAND	news from nowhere	Brighton, UK
Siren	Ray Lee	Oxford, UK
Don McGlashan	Don McGlashan	Auckland, NZ
13 Most Beautiful… Songs for Andy Warhol's Screentests	Dean Wareham and Britta Phillips	New York, USA
Bang on a Can All-Stars	Bang on a Can	New York, USA
Every Time I See your Picture I Cry	Daniel Barrow	
Hooliganship		
Into the Dark Unknown: The Hope Chest	Holcombe Waller	
DJ Betti Forde		
Gunshae		
Hank Pine and Lily Fawn		
Parenthetical Girls		
The Awkward Stage		
the beige		
The Pascale Picard Band		
Vincat		
Woodpigeon		
The Amazing and Impermeable Cromoli Brother Present: HELLO VANCOUVER!		
Twenty-Minute Musicals	Juana Molina & nick Krgovich	
Monopoly! Tesla, Edison, Microsoft, Wal-Mart and the War For Tomorrow

=== 2010 PuSh Festival ===
There were 14 productions in the 2010 PuSh International Performing Arts Festival:

China	William Yang	Sydney, AU
Clark and I Somewhere in Connecticut	Rumble Productions/Theatre Replacement	Vancouver, CA
The Edward Curtis Project	Marie Clements/Rita Leistner	Galiano Island, CA/Toronto, CA
The Passion of Joan of Arc	Eye of Newt	Vancouver, CA
Best Before (working title)	Helgard Haug + Stefan Kaegi, Rimini Protokoll	Berlin, Germany/Vancouver, CA
Jerk	Gisèle Vienne/Dennis Cooper/Jonathan Capdevielle	Grenoble, FR/Paris, FR
The Show Must Go On	Jérôme Bel	Paris, FR/Vancouver, CA
KAMP	Hotel Modern	Rotterdam, NL
White Cabin	Akhe Theatre	St. Petersburg, RU
Sō Percussion plays Steve Reich and David Lang	Sō Percussion	Brooklyn, USA
Sonic Genome	Anthony Braxton	Middletown, USA
The Passion Project	Reid Farrington	New York, USA
Poetics: a ballet brut	Nature Theater of Oklahoma	New York, USA
Nevermore: The Imaginary Life and Mysterious Death of Edgar Allan Poe	Catalyst Theatre	Edmonton, CA

=== 2011 PuSh Festival ===
There were 30 productions in the 2009 PuSh International Performing Arts Festival:

Peter Panties	Neworld Theatre/Leaky Heaven Circus	Vancouver, CA
Podplays - The Quartet	Neworld Theatre/PTC	Vancouver, CA
Datamatics [Ver. 2.0]	Ryoji Ikeda	Paris, FR
La Marea (The Tide)	Mariano Pensotti	Buenos Aires, AR
46 Circus Acts in 45 Minutes	Circa	Brisbane, AU
Circa	Circa	Brisbane, AU
Bonanza	Berlin	Antwerp, Belgium
Iqaluit	Berlin	Antwerp, Belgium
Rouge	Julie Andrée T.	Montreal, CA
Dances for a Small Stage 23	MovEnt	Vancouver, CA
Terminal City Soundscape	Music on Main	Vancouver, CA
100% Vancouver	Theatre Replacement/SFU Woodward's	Vancouver, CA
Happy Birthday Teenage City	Veda Hille and special guests	
The Meal	Rick Maddocks and the Lost Gospel Ensemble	
City of Dreams	Peter Reder	London, England/Vancouver, CA
Portraits in Motion	Volker Gerling	
In the Solitute of Cotton Fields	Radoslaw Rychcik/Stefan Zermski Theatre	Kielce, Poland
Sound Machine	Company Drift	Zurich-Fribourg, Switzerland
Floating	Hugh Hughes/Hoipolloi	Anglesey, Wales
Hard Core Logo: Live	November Theatre/Theatre Network/Touchstone Theatre	Edmonton, CA/Vancouver, CA
Trampoline Hall		
Good Gets Better & Looking for Love in the Hall of Mirrors	Daniel Barrow	
Close at Hand	Nervous System System	
Dayna Hanson & friends		
Fine Mist		
Meatdraw		
The British Columbians		
Weekend Leisure Karaoke		
Gloria's Cause	Dayna Hanson	
Inventions & Mysteries	Bro Gilbert	

=== 2012 PuSh Festival ===
The 2012 PuSh Festival took place from January 16 to February 4, and offered works from Canada, the United States, the United Kingdom, Spain, Japan, Lebanon, New Zealand, Argentina, the Netherlands, and Mexico. There were over 160 performances and events across 14 venues, of which 31 were sold out. Attendance was over 23,000.

=== 2013 PuSh Festival ===
The 2013 PuSh Festival took place from January 15 to February 3, and offered works from Argentina, Belgium, Canada, Denmark, England, France, Germany Japan, Scotland, Taiwan, and the United States. There were over 190 performances and events across 16 venues, of which 44 were sold out. Attendance was over 34,000.

=== 2014 PuSh Festival ===
The 2014 PuSh Festival took place January 14 to February 2, and offered works from Canada, England, Germany, Ireland, Lebanon, Portugal, and the United States. There were over 150 performances and events across 15 venues, including the Vancouver Playhouse, SFU Woodwards and the York Theatre. Feature events included the 10th Anniversary Opening Gala performance and party; 20 Main Stage shows spanning theatre, dance, music and multimedia performance; 17 PuSh Conversations with artists pre- and post-performances; three weeks of startling, experimental performances at Club PuSh; a film series; the PuSh Assembly for arts industry; Patrons Circle donor events; and dinner/theatre packages with Dine Out Vancouver. In 2014, PuSh Festival hosted two Artists-in-Residence in partnership with grunt gallery and the Contemporary Art Gallery (Vancouver) for the first time. The international visiting artists Rabih Mroué of Lebanon and Tim Etchells of England were invited to present their work which crossed visual, theatre and literary forms.

Total attendance numbers reached almost 24,000, with an average house capacity of 79% for performances and 37 sold-out events. The Festival sold out 400 PuSh passes to loyal PuSh patrons by the end of December and launched its inaugural PuSh Youth Passport program, allowing 266 young people aged 16 to 24 to see select performances for discounted ticket prices.

The 2014 Accessible PuSh program issued 375 tickets to community groups to attend performances for free.

A dedicated roster of over 181 volunteers worked more than 2,400 hours in support of the Festival.

=== 2015 PuSh Festival ===
The 2015 PuSh International Performing Arts Festival took place January 20 to February 8, and offered works from Argentina, Australia, Belgium, Canada, Czech Republic, Democratic Republic of the Congo, France, Germany, the Netherlands, Norway, Scotland, and the United States. There were over 250 performances and events across 17 venues, of which over 90 were sold out. Attendance was over 28,000.

=== 2016 PuSh Festival ===
The 2016 PuSh International Performing Arts Festival took place January 19 to February 7, and offered works from 7 countries. There were 250 performances and events across 17 venues, of which 125 were sold out. Attendance was over 23,000. The Artist-in-Residence was Jordan Tannahill.

=== 2017 PuSh Festival ===
The 2017 PuSh International Performing Arts Festival took place January 16 to February 5. There were 200 performances and events across 18 venues, of which 97 were sold out. Attendance was over 22,500.

=== 2018 PuSh Festival ===
The 2018 PuSh International Performing Arts Festival took place January 16 to February 4, and featured 96 Canadian artists and 79 International artists. There were 150 performances and events across 18 venues over 20 days.

=== 2019 PuSh Festival ===
The 2019 PuSh International Performing Arts Festival took place January 17 to February 3, 2019. The Artist-in-Residence was The Biting School.

=== 2020 PuSh Festival ===
The 2020 PuSh International Performing Arts Festival took place

=== 2021 PuSh Festival ===
The 2021 PuSh International Performing Arts Festival took place online.

=== 2022 PuSh Festival ===
The 2022 PuSh International Performing Arts Festival took place January 20 to February 6, 2022

=== 2023 PuSh Festival ===
The 2023 PuSh International Performing Arts Festival took place January 19 to February 5, 2023.

There were 19 contemporary works presented in theatre, dance, music, circus and multimedia in person and online.

afternow	nora chipaumire / arktype	Zimbabwe/USA
Never Twenty One	Smail Kanoute / Compagnie Vivons!	France
Lolling and Rolling	Jaha Koo / CAMPO	Belgium/South Korea
Coloured Swan 3: Harriet's reMix	Moya Michael / AnaKu & KVS	Belgium/South Africa
The Seventh Fire	Delinquent Theatre / Full Circle	Vancouver, Canada
A Percussionist's Songbook	Joby Burgess	UK
LONTANO + INSTANE	Juan Ignacio Tula, Marica Marinoni / Compagnie 7Bis	France/Argentina/Italy
Le cri des méduses	Alan Lake Factorie	Canada
Soliloquio (I Woke Up and Hit My Head Against the Wall)	Tiziano Cruz	Argentina
MANUAL	Adam Kinner, Christopher Willes	Canada
Red Phone	Boca del Lupo	Vancouver, Canada
An Undeveloped Sound	Electric Company Theatre	Vancouver, Canada
Are we not drawn onward to new erA	Ontroerend Goed	Belgium
Okinum	Emilie Monnet / Productions Onishka / AnAku	Canada
THIS & the last caribou	New Dance Horizons	Canada
The Café	Aphotic Theatre / ITSAZOO Productions	Vancouver, Canada
Soldiers of Tomorrow	The Elblow Theatre	Vancouver, Canada
O'DD	Race Horse Company	Finland
Selfie Concert	Ivo Dimchev / Something Great	Bulgaria

=== 2024 PuSh Festival ===
The 2024 PuSh International Performing Arts Festival took place January 18 to February 4, 2024.

=== 2025 PuSh Festival ===
The 2025 PuSh International Performing Arts Festival will take place January 23 to February 9, 2025 and celebrates its 20th Festival of Audacious Live Art.
