= Stanley Industrial Alliance Stage =

Theatre in Vancouver, Canada

Coordinates: 49°15′40.24″N 123°8′18.83″W

Stanley BFL Canada Stage
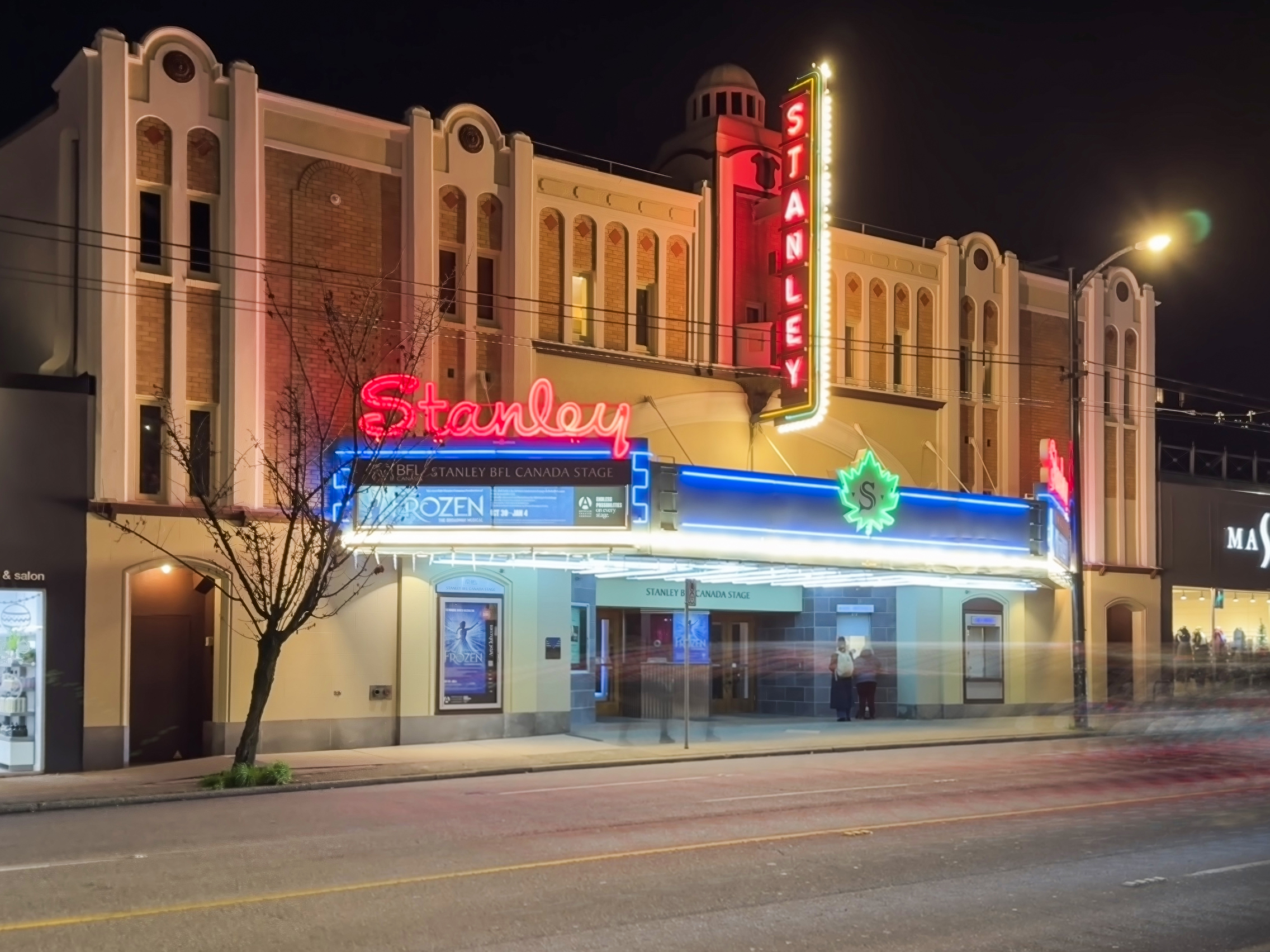
- Theatre in 2025
- Interactive map of Stanley BFL Canada Stage
- Former names: Stanley Theatre; Stanley Theatre du Maurier Stage
- Location: 2750 Granville Street; Vancouver, British Columbia; V6H 3J3
- Owner: Arts Club Theatre Company (formerly owned by Famous Players)
- Capacity: 650 (formerly 1,216)
- Type: Live theatre (former movie palace)

Construction
- Opened: December 15, 1930
- Closed: September 21, 1991
- Reopened: October 28, 1998

The Stanley BFL Canada Stage (formerly the Stanley Industrial Alliance Theatre) is a landmark theatre at 12th Avenue and Granville Street in Vancouver, British Columbia, which serves as the main stage for the Arts Club Theatre Company. The Stanley first opened as a movie theatre in December 1930 and showed movies for over sixty years before falling revenues led to its closure in 1991. After years of threatened commercial redevelopment, the Stanley was renovated as a stage theatre between 1997 and 1998 and subsequently awarded status as a heritage building.

As a stage for the Arts Club, the Stanley has been used to put on classics, Broadway musicals and other large productions, including Swing!, My Fair Lady, Miss Saigon, Disney's Beauty and the Beast and Irving Berlin's White Christmas. The theatre, which went through major fundraising to finance its renovations and mortgage, at one stage lost its sponsor, du Maurier, due to tobacco regulations, but in 2005 received new sponsorship from Industrial Alliance Pacific Life Insurance Company and the theatre's name was changed to the Stanley Industrial Alliance Stage.

== Movie theatre ==
The Stanley opened on December 15, 1930. Originally envisioned as a vaudeville venue, it was built by Frederick Guest, owner of a chain of theatres in Ontario, who reportedly fell in love with Vancouver and decided to build his dream theatre there. He hired Henry Holdsby Simmonds as the architect, who designed it with a neoclassical interior and an Art Deco exterior, with seating for 1,216 people. In order to make as high quality a theatre as possible, Simmonds used only the best materials he could find, including Tyndall stone from Winnipeg and tiles from Italy, along with chandeliers, carpets and furnishings from local merchants. Like the Stanley Cup and Stanley Park, the theatre was named after Governor General of Canada Lord Stanley.

The first film shown at the Stanley was One Romantic Night, starring Lillian Gish. Admission was originally between 10 and 40 cents. The vertical Stanley sign was added in 1940 and the stylized Stanley script came in 1957. The cinema, which had been part of the Granville Theatre Company, was bought by Famous Players in 1941 for $268,000.

The Stanley was originally built as a neighbourhood theatre but gradually became more popular and attracted moviegoers from throughout the Vancouver region. From the 1950s onwards, progressively improved sound and projection systems along with refurbished seating added to the theatre's appeal. On July 8, 1954 the Stanley began showing films in stereophonic CinemaScope for the first time. By December 1958, the theatre had a DP70 70mm projector, and the Stanley was advertised as "the only Todd-AO theatre in Western Canada". By October 1978, the auditorium was equipped with Dolby Stereo, and by December 1985 its sound system was upgraded and certified to THX quality assurance standards.

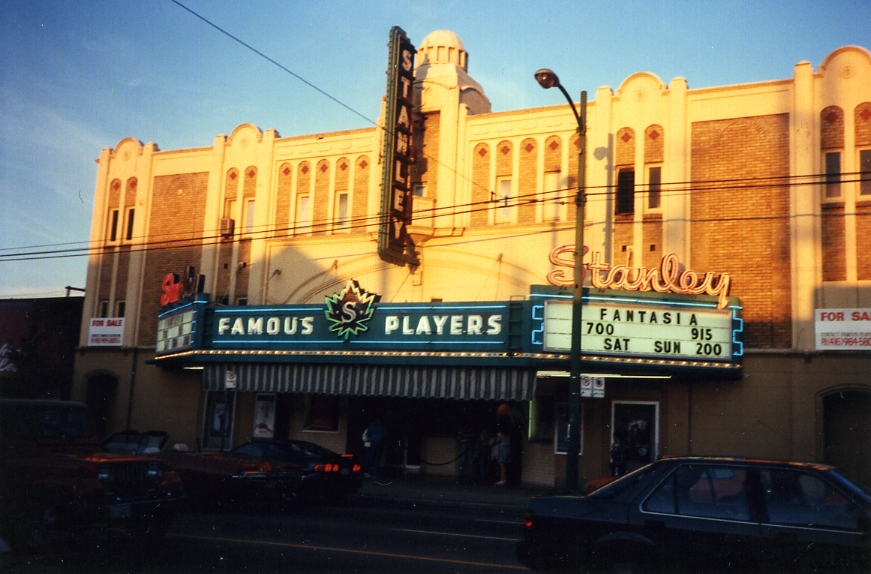
The Stanley Theatre with for sale signs in September 1991, shortly before its closure as a movie house

The Stanley often showed blockbusters. Some movies shown at the theatre through the years included The Exorcist, The Towering Inferno, The Muppet Movie, Apocalypse Now, The Empire Strikes Back, The Elephant Man, Poltergeist, The Right Stuff, Indiana Jones and the Temple of Doom, Top Gun, Empire of the Sun, Indiana Jones and the Last Crusade, and Goodfellas.

Revenues declined during the late 20th century, and Famous Players closed the Stanley, which was by then the oldest operating movie theatre in Vancouver, on September 25, 1991 after a final showing of the Stanley regular Fantasia; the theatre had previously shown Fantasia at least four times, in 1977, 1979, 1980–1981, and 1990. Its closure was part of a long trend: The number of Famous Players theatres had dropped from 419 in 1954 to 196 in 1969, and would fall to 80, some in partnership with other companies, by the time it was taken over by Cineplex Galaxy Entertainment in 2005. Other Vancouver-area Famous Players movie theatres closed, sold or torn down in this period included the Fine Arts (1989), Denman Place (1989), Park Royal (1993), the Park (2005), and the Capitol 6 (2005).

== Renovation ==
Famous Players put the Stanley up for sale in the spring of 1991, with the condition that it not be used as a movie theatre. In the months leading up to the Stanley's closure, Famous Players had a conditional sale agreement for the theatre with Vancouver developer Sandy Cox, who was planning to keep the Stanley's facade and convert the interior into retail space. The Vancouver City Council received a proposal to change the building to retail use, which it approved, but the planned development was abandoned, and the building remained vacant for several years. During the early 1990s, a "Save Our Stanley" campaign was begun to preserve the building and prevent commercial redevelopment of the space. In 1994, the Stanley Theatre Society was formed to try to buy the Stanley for the Arts Club Theatre Company, and in 1997 it purchased the theatre from Famous Players for $3,173,000. Renovation costs, including sound and lighting equipment, came to $5.8 million, which brought the costs of purchase and renovation to about $9 million, $1.5 million more than the $7.5 million originally budgeted. Money came from fundraising campaigns by the Arts Club and Vancouver TheatreSports, at least $3.9 million from the provincial and federal government, a $100,000 grant from the City of Vancouver, the purchase of a density transfer to the One Wall Centre by Peter Wall for $1.2 million, as well as corporate sponsorship by du Maurier, although du Maurier would later withdraw as a sponsor because of federal restrictions on tobacco advertising.

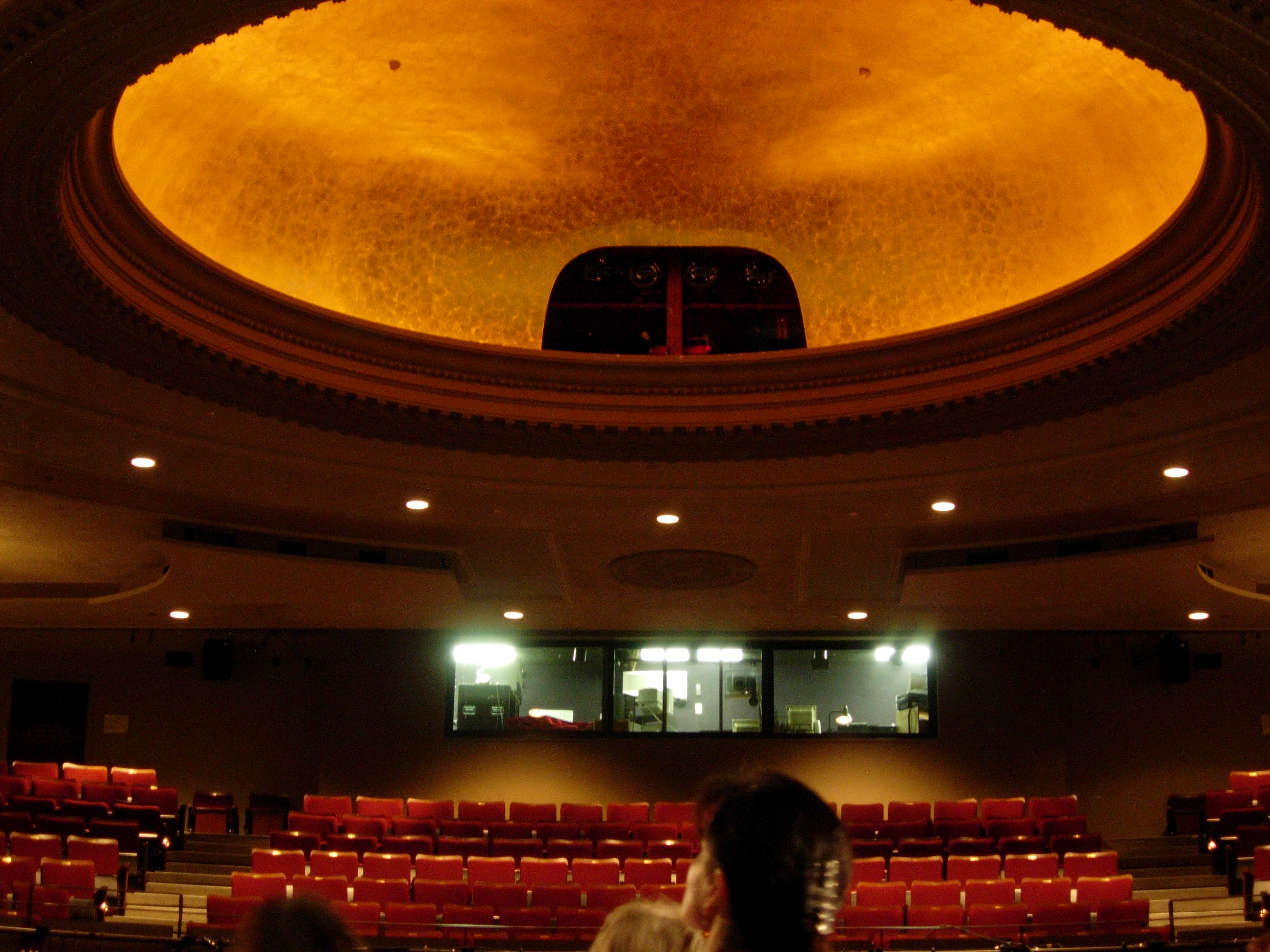
Gold-leaf covered dome from front of house, showing stage lighting position

Architects including Thom Weeks and Jennifer Stanley led renovations of the Stanley into a live theatre. Weeks was initially disappointed with the state of the pre-renovated theatre, which looked "pretty tired" with its aged orange walls and sticky, soft drink-stained carpets. However, by the time the renovations were completed, and the actors and musicians were getting ready to first perform in it, there was a general feeling of excitement about the theatre. Renovations included expansion of the lobby, reconfiguration of the balcony, an expansion of the stage to twice its original size, a new twenty-five metre fly tower from which to raise and lower scenery, new dressing rooms, a trap room, an electrical room and a green room backstage, a reduction of the number of seats from 1,216 to 650, a crush bar in the old projection booth, a section cut out of the theatre's dome to use for spotlights, and a full restoration of the theatre's gold-leafed plaster decorations. As a result of these renovations, in 1999 the theatre was awarded a City of Vancouver Heritage Award, as well as an IES International Illumination Design Award.

=== Effects on the local area ===
A 2003 study claimed the Stanley's renovation brought positive economic effects to the theatre's local area, bounded by 8th Street and 17th between Fir and Hemlock. According to the study, this area became more of a leisure/recreation destination, with many new culturally related businesses, retail stores and service-related businesses opening. An increase in overall sales was noted and 76% of surveyed residents responded that the theatre's reopening had a positive effect on the community. Business respondents also reportedly had a positive view of the theatre's effects.

== Live stage ==
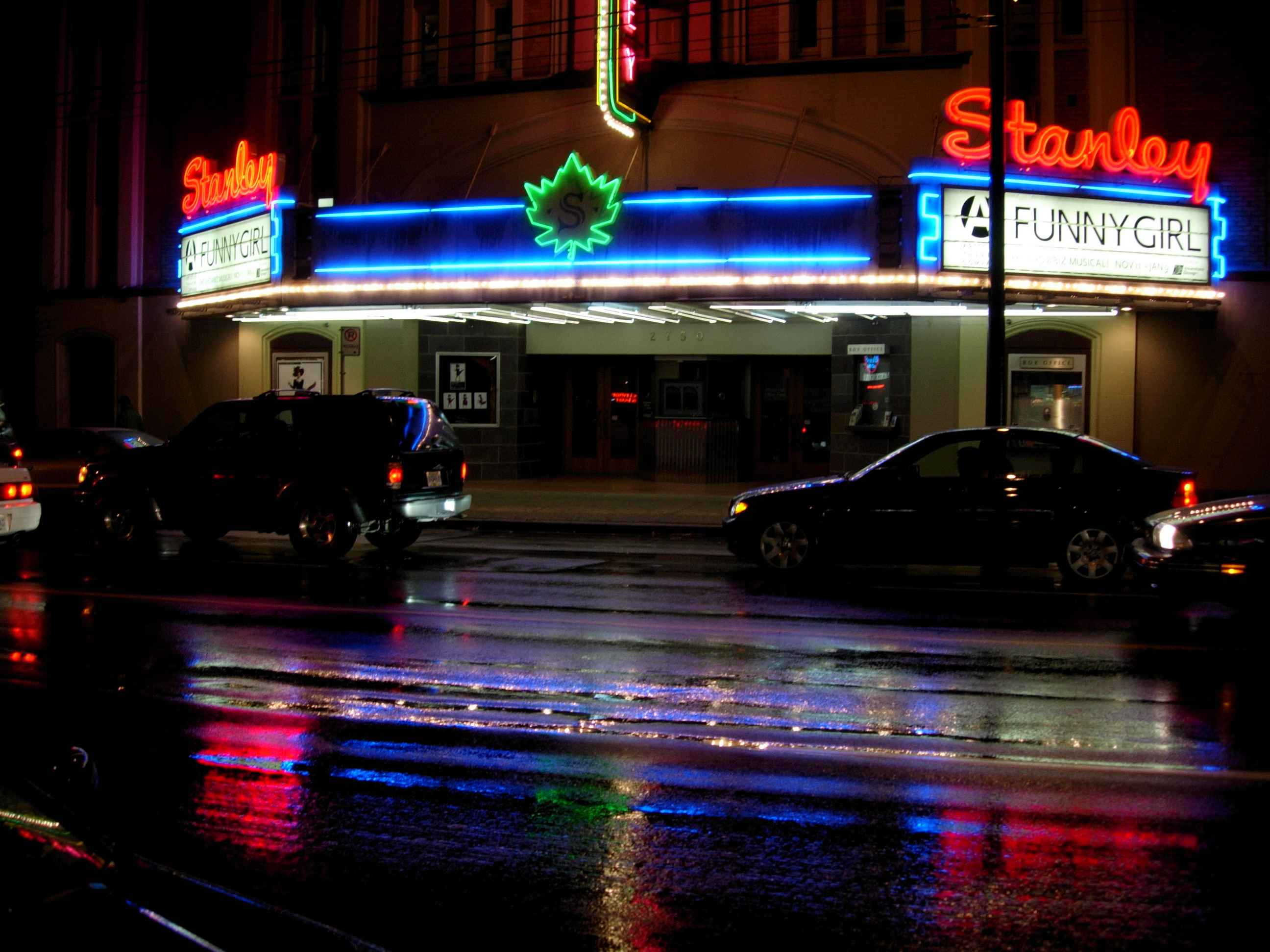
The 2004–2005 production of Funny Girl

After renovation, owing to du Maurier's sponsorship, the facility was named the Stanley Theatre du Maurier Stage, taken over by the Arts Club Theatre Company and later became their main stage. This venue has allowed the Arts Club to put on new kinds of shows, such as large musicals, classics and productions from around the world. The first production was Swing!, which opened on October 28, 1998 and had a successful run, followed by Hamlet. In addition to showing Arts Club productions, the theatre is rented out for other purposes, including business and educational presentations, and has been used for comedy acts and concerts, such as Lorne Elliott, Francis Cabrel, and RyanDan.

By 2005 du Maurier had withdrawn as a sponsor and, along with its over-budget renovation costs, the Stanley was left with a $2 million mortgage. That year Industrial Alliance Pacific Life Insurance Company made a $1.5 million donation, and on April 5 the theatre was renamed the Stanley Industrial Alliance Stage for the next twenty years.

=== Productions ===
2019–2020 season
| Show | Run Dates |
|---|---|
| A Thousand Splendid Suns | September 12, 2019 – October 13, 2019 |
| The Sound of Music | November 7, 2019 – January 5, 2020 |
| Noises Off | January 23, 2020 – February 23, 2020 |
| carried away on the crest of a wave | Cancelled due to COVID-19 |
| Kinky Boots | Cancelled due to COVID-19 |

2018–2019 season
| Show | Run Dates |
|---|---|
| The Curious Incident of the Dog in the Night-time | September 6, 2018 – October 7, 2018 |
| Sweat | October 18, 2018 – November 18, 2018 |
| Disney's Beauty and the Beast | December 1, 2018 – January 6, 2019 |
| The Matchmaker | January 24, 2019 – February 24, 2019 |
| The Orchard (After Chekov) | March 21, 2019 – April 21, 2019 |
| Matilda the Musical | May 16, 2019 – July 14, 2019 |

2017–2018 season
| Show | Run Dates |
|---|---|
| Angels in America | September 7, 2017 – October 8, 2017 |
| King Charles III | October 19, 2017 – November 19, 2017 |
| Disney's Beauty and the Beast | December 7, 2017 – January 7, 2018 |
| Jitters | January 25, 2018 – February 25, 2018 |
| The Humans | March 22, 2018 – April 22, 2018 |
| Mamma Mia! | May 10, 2018 – July 8, 2018 |

2016–2017 season
| Show | Run Dates |
|---|---|
| Baskerville: A Sherlock Holmes Mystery | September 8, 2016 – October 9, 2016 |
| Bakersfield Mist | October 20, 2016 – November 20, 2016 |
| Mary Poppins | December 3, 2016 – January 1, 2017 |
| The Audience | January 26, 2017 – February 26, 2017 |
| Brent Carver and the Art of Time Ensemble | March 2, 2017 – March 5, 2017 |
| Angels in America | March 23, 2017 – April 23, 2017 |
| Million Dollar Quartet | May 11, 2017 – July 9, 2017 |

2015–2016 season
| Show | Run Dates |
|---|---|
| Disgraced | September 17, 2015 – October 18, 2015 |
| A Christmas Story, The Musical | November 5, 2015 – December 27, 2015 |
| Pride & Prejudice | January 28, 2016 – February 28, 2016 |
| Good People | March 24, 2016 – April 24, 2016 |
| Billy Elliot | May 12, 2016 – July 10, 2016 |

2014–2015 season
| Show | Run Dates |
|---|---|
| 4000 Miles | September 11, 2014 – October 12, 2014 |
| Saint Joan | October 23, 2014 – November 23, 2014 |
| Mary Poppins | December 5, 2014 – January 4, 2015 |
| One Man, Two Guvnors | January 22, 2015 – February 22, 2015 |
| Vanya and Sonia and Masha and Spike | March 19, 2015 – April 19, 2015 |
| In the Heights | April 30, 2015 – June 7, 2015 |
| Les Misérables | July 2, 2015 – August 16, 2015 |

2013–2014 season
| Show | Run Dates |
|---|---|
| Other Desert Cities | September 19, 2013 – October 20, 2013 |
| Mary Poppins | November 7, 2013 – January 5, 2014 |
| The Odd Couple | January 22, 2014 – February 23, 2014 |
| Helen Lawrence | March 13, 2014 – April 13, 2014 |
| Monty Python's Spamalot | May 8, 2014 – July 29, 2014 |

2012–2013 season
| Show | Run Dates |
|---|---|
| Clybourne Park | September 6, 2012 – October 7, 2012 |
| She Stoops to Conquer | October 18, 2012 – November 18, 2012 |
| Boeing-Boeing | January 24, 2013 – February 24, 2013 |
| 2 Pianos 4 Hands | March 14, 2013 – April 14, 2013 |
| Dreamgirls | May 7, 2013 – July 9, 2013 |

2011–2012 season
| Show | Run Dates |
|---|---|
| Next to Normal | September 8, 2011 – October 9, 2011 |
| The Penelopiad | October 20, 2011 – November 20, 2011 |
| Irvin Berlin's White Christmas: The Musical | December 2, 2011 – December 28, 2011 |
| Calendar Girls | January 26, 2012 – February 26, 2012 |
| The Importance of Being Earnest | March 15, 2012 – April 15, 2012 |
| High Society | May 10, 2012 – June 24, 2012 |
| Buddy: The Buddy Holly Story | July 12, 2012 – August 26, 2012 |

2010–2011 season
| Show | Run Dates |
|---|---|
| Tear the Curtain! | September 9, 2010 – October 10, 2010 |
| The 39 Steps | October 21, 2010 – November 21, 2010 |
| Irvin Berlin's White Christmas: The Musical | December 4, 2010 – January 2, 2011 |
| August: Osage County | January 27, 2011 – February 27, 2011 |
| The Philanderer | March 17, 2011 – April 17, 2011 |
| Hairspray | May 7, 2011 – July 10, 2011 |

2009–2010 season
| Show | Run Dates |
|---|---|
| Black Comedy | September 10, 2009 – October 11, 2009 |
| Irvin Berlin's White Christmas: The Musical | November 7, 2009 – December 27, 2009 |
| Mrs. Dexter and Her Daily | January 7, 2010 – February 7, 2010 |
| Paradise Garden | March 11, 2010 – April 11, 2010 |
| Buddy: The Buddy Holly Story | May 13, 2010 – July 11, 2010 |
| Glengarry Glen Ross | July 22, 2010 – August 22, 2010 |

2008–2009 season
| Show | Run Dates |
|---|---|
| Doubt | September 11, 2008 – October 12, 2008 |
| Cyrano de Bergerac | October 23, 2008 – November 23, 2008 |
| Disney's Beauty and the Beast | December 6, 2008 – January 4, 2009 |
| The Constant Wife | January 22, 2009 – February 22, 2009 |
| Homechild | March 12, 2009 – April 12, 2009 |
| Les Misérables | May 14, 2009 – July 19, 2009 |

2007–2008 season
| Show | Run Dates |
|---|---|
| Company | September 13, 2007 – October 14, 2007 |
| The Glass Menagerie | October 25, 2007 – November 25, 2007 |
| Disney's Beauty and the Beast | December 6, 2007 – January 6, 2008 |
| Glorious! | January 24, 2008 – February 24, 2008 |
| Rabbit Hole | March 13, 2008 – April 13, 2008 |
| The Producers | May 25, 2008 – July 13, 2008 |

2006–2007 season
| Show | Run Dates |
|---|---|
| Cookin' at the Cookery | September 14, 2006 – October 15, 2006 |
| The School for Scandal | October 26, 2006 – November 26, 2006 |
| Disney's Beauty and the Beast | December 7, 2006 – January 14, 2007 |
| Up Island | January 25, 2007 – February 25, 2007 |
| Half Life | March 8, 2007 – April 8, 2007 |
| Gypsy | May 10, 2007 – July 8, 2007 |
| Cookin' at the Cookery | August 2, 2007 – August 26, 2007 |

2005–2006 season
| Show | Run Dates |
|---|---|
| The Diary of Anne Frank | September 22, 2005 – October 23, 2005 |
| Disney's Beauty and the Beast | November 17, 2005 – January 15, 2006 |
| Absurd Person Singular | February 2, 2006 – March 5, 2006 |
| Waiting for Godot | March 23, 2006 – April 23, 2006 |
| Cabaret | May 18, 2006 – July 9, 2006 |

2004–2005 season
| Show | Run Dates |
|---|---|
| A Flea in Her Ear | September 23, 2004 – October 24, 2004 |
| Funny Girl | November 11, 2004 – January 9, 2005 |
| Enchanted April | February 3, 2005 – March 6, 2005 |
| Unless | March 31, 2005 – May 1, 2005 |
| Miss Saigon | May 19, 2005 – July 10, 2005 |

2003–2004 season
| Show | Run Dates |
|---|---|
| Othello | September 26, 2003 – October 26, 2003 |
| Singin' in the Rain | November 14, 2003 – January 14, 2004 |
| Dirty Blonde | January 30, 2004 – February 29, 2004 |
| Private Lives | March 12, 2004 – April 11, 2004 |
| Evita | April 30, 2004 – June 27, 2004 |

2002–2003 season
| Show | Run Dates |
|---|---|
| To Kill a Mockingbird | September 26, 2002 – November 3, 2002 |
| West Side Story | November 14, 2002 – January 12, 2003 |
| Arsenic and Old Lace | January 23, 2003 – February 23, 2003 |
| The Memory of Water | March 6, 2003 – April 6, 2003 |
| Dial M for Murder | May 8, 2003 – June 8, 2003 |
| Shirley Valentine | July 17, 2003 – August 24, 2003 |

2001–2002 season
| Show | Run Dates |
|---|---|
| Elizabeth Rex | September 28, 2001 – October 28, 2001 |
| My Fair Lady | November 16, 2001 – January 13, 2002 |
| All My Sons | January 25, 2002 – February 24, 2002 |
| Dinner with Friends | March 8, 2002 – April 14, 2002 |
| Mousetrap | May 16, 2002 – June 21, 2002 |
| My Fair Lady | July 31, 2002 – September 15, 2002 |

2000–2001 season
| Show | Run Dates |
|---|---|
| Amadeus | September 28, 2000 – November 5, 2000 |
| She Loves Me | November 16, 2000 – December 31, 2000 |
| The Ginko Tree | January 26, 2001 – February 25, 2001 |
| 'Art' | March 15, 2001 – May 6, 2001 |
| Ain't Misbehavin' | May 17, 2001 – July 15, 2001 |
| And Then There Were None | July 26, 2001 – September 17, 2001 |

1999–2000 season
| Show | Run Dates |
|---|---|
| Sweeney Todd | October 1, 1999 – October 30, 1999 |
| Blithe Spirit | November 18, 1999 – December 31, 1999 |
| For the Pleasure of Seeing Her Again | January 14, 2000 – February 12, 2000 |
| Communicating Doors | March 3, 2000 – April 1, 2000 |
| The Foursome | April 24, 2000 – May 24, 2000 |
| Hotel Porter | July 6, 2000 – September 2, 2000 |

1998–1999 season
| Show | Run Dates |
|---|---|
| Swing! | October 28, 1998 – November 22, 1998 |
| Hamlet | January 27, 1999 – February 20, 1999 |
| Moon Over Buffalo | March 11, 1999 – April 4, 1999 |
| Easy Money | May 5, 1999 – May 30, 1999 |
| Swing! | June 17, 1999 – August 1, 1999 |

== See also ==
- List of heritage buildings in Vancouver
- Theatre in Canada
- South Granville Rise
- Orpheum (Vancouver)
