= The Secret World of Og =

1961 novel by Pierre Berton

- Cover of the first edition
- Author: Pierre Berton
- Language: English
- Genre: Children's novel
- Publisher: McClelland and Stewart
- Publication date: 1961
- Publication place: Canada
- Media type: Print (Hardback & Paperback)

The Secret World of Og is a children's novel written by Pierre Berton and illustrated by his daughter Patsy. It was first published in 1961 by McClelland and Stewart.

This Canadian classic has sold more than 200,000 copies in four editions.

Of his forty-seven books, this was Berton's personal favourite, partly because the characters were inspired by his own children. The Secret World of Og brought the author more fan mail than anything else he wrote – at least a dozen letters a week from children across Canada.

== Plot introduction ==
In this fantasy adventure, four children — Penny, the leader; Pamela, her common-sense sister; Peter, whose life's ambition is to become a garbageman; and Patsy, who collects frogs in her pockets — set out in search of their baby brother, Paul, better known as “The Pollywog,” who has vanished mysteriously from their playhouse. Accompanied by their fearless pets, the children descend through a secret trapdoor into a strange underground world of mushrooms, whose green inhabitants know only one word: “OG!”

== Film, TV or theatrical adaptations ==
An animated television special based on the book, also called The Secret World of Og produced by Hanna-Barbera, was previously broadcast in 1983 in the United States as part of ABC Weekend Specials during its sixth season.

The Secret World of Og served to inspire an animated action-adventure television series produced in 2006 and airing on CBC Television, Canada's national public broadcaster. The series also airs in the United States on Starz Kids and Family with a TV-PG rating, despite its family-oriented nature.

The TV series extends the storyline of the original book, following the five Berton siblings as they descend through a hole in the floor of their playhouse to explore the underground world of Og. There, amid subterranean rivers, caverns and elaborate villages built of mushrooms, they interact with little green creatures called Ogs, and their myriad neighbours - trolls, ogres and fairies, and a mysterious sea monster named Nessie.

Carousel Theatre produced a stage version of The Secret World of Og in April 2009 in Vancouver, BC, adapted by Governor General's Award winning playwright Kevin Kerr.

The Canadian Children's Opera Company (CCOC) produced an operatic version in May 2010 at the Enwave Theatre of the Harbourfront Centre, Toronto. The Secret World of Og, with libretto and music by Dean Burry, is directed by Joel Ivany and conducted by Ann Cooper Gay.

The Sarasota Youth Opera of the Sarasota Opera presented the United States premiere of the operatic version on November 12, 2016 at the historic Sarasota Opera House. The piece was directed by Martha Collins and conducted by Jesse Martins.
