= Chrystal Sparrow =

Musqueam Coast Salish artist

Chrystal Sparrow (born 1983) is a traditional and contemporary Musqueam Coast Salish artist living in Vancouver, British Columbia, Canada.

== Biography ==
Sparrow comes from a family of Coast Salish artists, weavers, and carvers. She is a visual artist and a third-generation carver, having been traditionally mentored by her late father, master carver Irving Sparrow. She is also a fourth-generation fisherwoman.

== Art Practice ==
Sparrow sees Coast Salish art as a language, learned through "designing, and experimenting in new mediums." Intergenerational learning, and the ways of knowing inherent in the land that is Musqueam's traditional and unceded territory, are intimately connected in Sparrow's practice. Her designs are distinctly feminine, with an emphasis on simplicity and elegance. In addition to painting and carving, for which she uses acrylics and both red and yellow cedar, she has also worked with jewelry and weaving. She is currently looking to abstraction, beadwork, and colour elements that draw from her Cree and Shuswap heritage.

In 2018, Sparrow became the inaugural artist-in-residence at A Frame Activation: Musqueam, Squamish and Tsleil-Waututh Cultural Residency at Second Beach. Through her residency, she established a space for learning, conversation, and creating relationships. With a focus on building community and healing, she also used the space to invite elders and women from the Downtown Eastside Women's Centre (where she has worked as a cultural programmer) to create art and share a meal together.

Her public projects include a welcome post carved in 2019 as part of a project initiated by the Vancouver School Board (VSB). Sparrow worked alongside William Dan, who is also a member of the Musqueam Indian Band, as well as James Harry and his father Xwalacktun, who are members of the Squamish First Nation. The artists carved three posts that were erected outside the VSB's district office and Britannia Secondary School. The feminine figure in Sparrow's post wears a cedar hat and cloak and is surrounded by imagery relating to orca and salmon, speaking to Sparrow's identity as a female carver as well as her family's connection to fishing.

Sparrow's most recent work, Indigenous Matriarchs, was presented on a billboard at Arbutus St. and West 12th Avenue as part of Platforms: We Are Here, Live, a series of twenty-three public art projects commissioning xʷməθkʷəy̓əm (Musqueam), sḵwx̱wú7mesh (Squamish), and səlilwətaɬ (Tsleil-Waututh) artists. Indigenous Matriarchs is a multimedia work honouring Sparrow's "Coast Salish and Cree matriarchal lineage." Other works by Sparrow include a house post for In the Presence of Ancestors, a project curated by Coast Salish artist Tasha Faye Evans, which will see five posts raised in ceremony along Port Moody's Shoreline trail by June 21, 2023. In 2017, Sparrow carved a 7' by 3' red cedar panel commissioned by Starbucks Canada, #150plus wishes, in collaboration with the Broadway Youth Center, and in 2016, she completed a 7' by 3' red cedar panel for the City Council Chambers at Vancouver City Hall. Her work can also be seen at B.C. Children's Hospital, the leləm̓ Community Centre at the University of British Columbia, and at other locations across the city.

Sparrow began a diploma program in Expressive Art Therapy at the Vancouver School of Healing Arts in 2018, and is currently pursuing her M.A. in Expressive Arts Therapy at the European Graduate School in Switzerland. Her younger brother, Christopher Sparrow, is also a carver.
