= 7 Stories =

- Written by: Morris Panych
- Characters: Man, Charlotte, Rodney, Jennifer, Leonard, Marshall, Rachel, Percy, Michael, Joan, Al, Lillian, Nurse Wilson, The Four Window People
- Original language: English
- Subject: Man (the main character), contemplates jumping from a 7th story ledge, but the residents of the building keep popping out and interrupting him.
- Genre: Comedy
- Setting: 7th story of an apartment building

Premiere
- Date premiered: 1989
- Place premiered: Vancouver

7 Stories is a play created by Canadian playwright Morris Panych.

== Plot ==
The protagonist is standing on the ledge on the seventh story of a tall building, contemplating leaping to his death. He is interrupted by the colorful residents of the seventh story who are too caught up in their own lives to notice the man or question his being on the ledge of the building. The persons who interact with the man do so by opening or appearing at one or more of seven windows on the seventh storey. For the majority of the play, the people talking with the protagonist have most of the dialogue. The man hasn't much dialogue until near the end, when he explains that his daily routine was thrown off when he woke up and lost track of what day it was.

== Production ==
The set of 7 stories includes several windows, a ledge, and at least one spotlight. Man is stationed on the ledge and the rest of the cast plays their parts through the various windows.

== Characters ==
- Man: The protagonist of the play, he is contemplating jumping from the seventh story. He holds conversations with the residents of the building, and has the least dialogue with each one until the last, where he explains how he conducted his daily routine, and saw that things of everyday life are not how they appear to be. He explains his confusion on what day it was and how his daily schedule was thrown off, feeling lost and compelled to stand on the seventh story of the building.
- Charlotte: A young woman who appears to be having an affair with Rodney. Charlotte is a poet and a free-spirited idealist, while Rodney is a straightforward lawyer. The two have begun to play violent games with each other, which keeps their relationship new and exciting while also adding an element of surprise and mortality to their lives.
- Rodney: Rodney was a young married man who was in a relationship with Charlotte tried killing her so as to make their relationship alive. A lawyer having an affair with Charlotte, he constantly bickers with, threatens and attacks Charlotte. During a slump in his affair with Charlotte, Rodney ran over her with his car, which rekindled their relationship, albeit in a rather unorthodox way.
- Jennifer: A party guest on the seventh story. She is talkative, air-headed, and uninterested in those who don't make much conversation (as shown when the Man is silent after her statement of wanting to leap from the building and what a thrill it would be).
- Leonard: A psychiatrist who acts paranoid and provocative. He works at a local sanatorium for long hours, and claims to have not slept in years, resulting in him being very tired, irritable and unable to hear things clearly.
- Marshall: A gentleman about to be married to a rich heiress. He used to be an actor (though he claims he wasn't a particularly good one) and revealed himself to be a homosexual when he said he had date with a sailor. He also knows of the whole situation between Charlotte and Rodney, calling it a tragic love story. After hurrying out of a play to be on time for a date with a sailor and meeting the heiress by accident (she nearly ran over him with her car), he decided to forfeit his current life and identity for the one the heiress believed. He states that other people, friends and fellow actors, are in on the whole charade as well.
- Rachel: A deeply religious woman, Rachel often plays godly roles for people on the sixth and fifth stories, dropping appliances, eviction notices, money, and other items, influencing people's lives in one way or another. She believes people are incapable of acting on their own without the influence of either God or the Devil. She says that she was struck with many illnesses and her invalid mother committed suicide by drug overdose, both things she believes were God's work. The Man argues that suicide is not an act of God but a willful human act defying all predestination. She then insists the Devil sent him.
- Percy: A guest of the party that takes place on the seventh story. He constantly follows fads and mainstream activities, then tries to get out of them when everyone else does. He counts the number of friends he has, and when he admits he finds most of them awful, begins to try sorting those "friends" into groups of people he "likes" or "doesn't like".
- Michael: An artist who lives on the seventh story. He's sensitive to everyone and everything around him and is obsessed with colors and decorating to perfection. He often feels (at least when it comes to art, color and decor) that he is superbly intelligent.
- Joan: A woman who is constantly giving up her possessions for the sake of Michael's aesthetics. She claims that Michael is so sensitive to his surroundings that certain colors or fabric blends could make him ill. In spite of the expenses and frustration she feels at trying to work with him, she continues to follow his lead.
- Al: The host of the party on the seventh story. He frequents parties because he doesn't want to miss a good one, even those that don't turn out so great. He likes the idea of parties but dislikes the people who attend them, stating the actual event is a crushing disappointment. When he throws parties, he often try to shorten them by serving no food, playing music too loud and in extreme cases, starting small fires.
- Nurse Wilson: A callous and blunt nurse who cares for Lillian. She considers herself a humanitarian and claims to like people, but deeply dislikes them as individuals. Lillian insists that Nurse Wilson only acts callous and uncaring because of working at a job where people are sick, suffer, and die, thus thinking she has to pretend to have no feelings.
- Lillian: A hundred-year-old woman who knows more than she lets on. She hasn't gone outside in over 50 years. She once had a much-loved pigeon named Albert, and enjoys reflecting and talking about her life. She tells the Man of a time in her life when she met a distraught Frenchman in Paris. He talked to her in French, though she understood none of what he said, until he finally climbed to the ledge of a bridge, crying as he did. At that point she said to him the only phrase of French she ever learned. The young Frenchman responded positively and went away renewed, as if this philosophy would repair his life. The Man reveals to her that what she said in French was simply "The grapefruit is on the table", which Lillian insists isn't a bad philosophy to live by. She was the one who was different from the rest of the play characters as she insisted the man to follow his heart and flew like a bird. She succumbs to old age later on in the play.
- The four window people: Four generic characters who claim to have watched the Man from a building across the street the whole time. They are briefly introduced when the Man jumps from the building ledge and flies to the other building with the aid of his umbrella. They speak to the Man and to each other about the possible meaning of the whole scenario, and what statement was trying to be made.
