= Arts Club Theatre Company =

Theatrical company, Vancouver

- artsclub.com/img/arts-club-logo.png
- Location: BMO Theatre Centre, 162 W 1st Avenue; Vancouver, British Columbia; V5Y 0H6
- Capacity: Stanley Industrial Alliance Stage: 650; Granville Island Stage: 440; Newmont Stage: 250
- Type: Non-profit theatre company

Construction
- Opened: 1958; 68 years ago

Website
- artsclub.com

The Arts Club Theatre Company is a Canadian professional theatre company in Vancouver, British Columbia, founded in 1958. It is the largest urban not-for-profit theatre company in the country and the largest in Western Canada, with productions taking place at the 650-seat Stanley Industrial Alliance Stage, the 440-seat Granville Island Stage, the 250-seat Newmont Stage at the BMO Theatre Centre, and on tour around the province. The company celebrated its 60th season in 2024 and produced its 600th production in 2017.

Major themes from this company are new Canadian works, comedies, musicals, drama, and revues, with an emphasis on developing local and Canadian talent. In addition to theatre presentations, the company offers educational programs and special events.

Since 1972, the company's artistic director was Bill Millerd, who oversaw its expansion for over 45 years. On February 20, 2017, Millerd announced his retirement at the end of the 2017/2018 season. On June 28, 2017, it was announced that Ashlie Corcoran would take over as artistic director from the 2018–2019 season.

== History ==
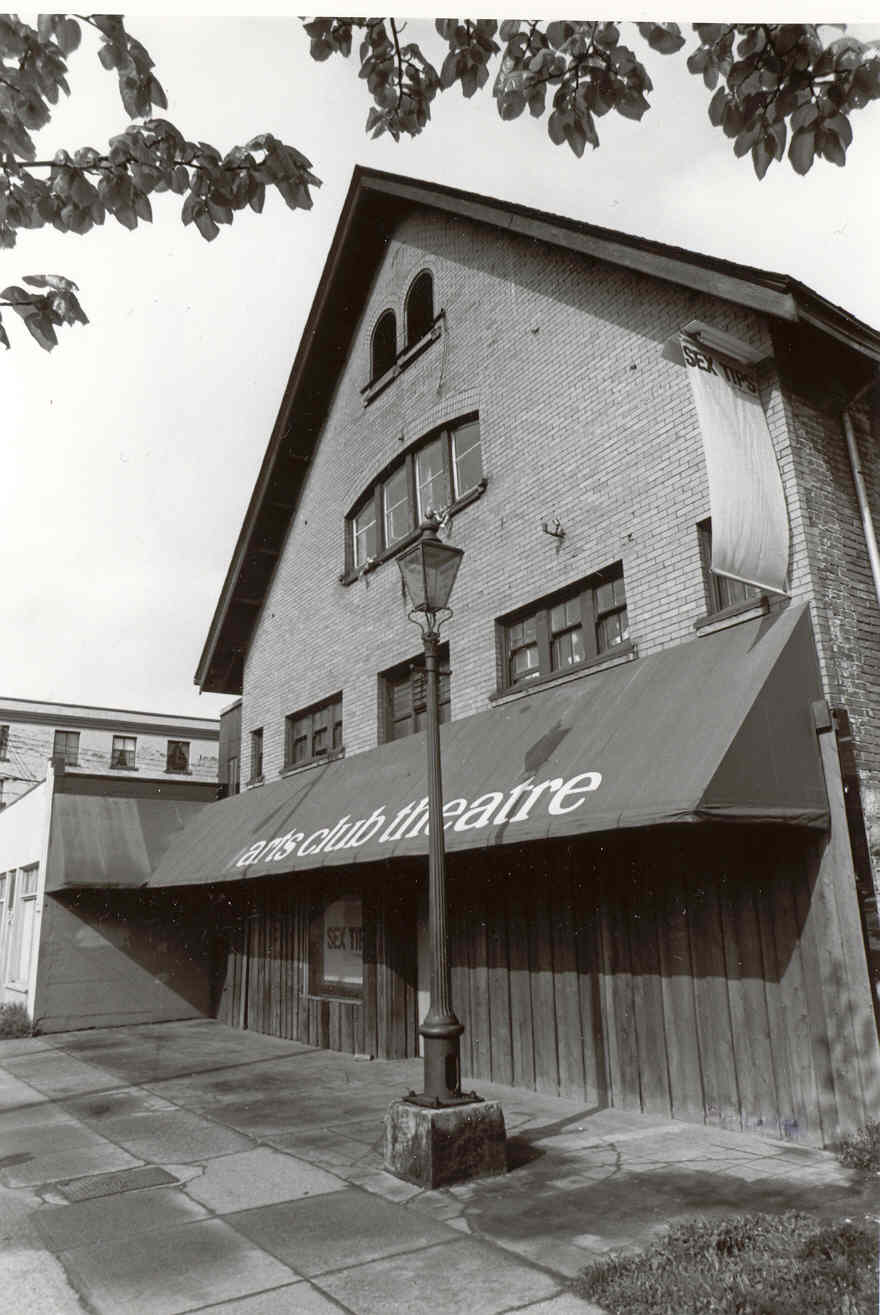
Seymour Street Theatre in 1972

The Arts Club was founded in 1958 originally as a private club for artists, musicians, and actors. In January 1964, Yvonne Firkins, a founding member of the B.C. Drama Association and B.C.'s "First Lady of the Theatre," renamed the club the Arts Club Theatre Company and established a new theatre in a converted gospel hall on Seymour Street in Downtown Vancouver. The first production was Moss Hart's Light Up the Sky. When Bill Millerd took over the company in 1972, it was producing four productions per year, with an annual budget of $150,000, and an audience of 29,000 patrons per year.

Competing with the Canada Council-created Vancouver Playhouse Theatre Company, the Arts Club became known for programming gritty new plays like David Freeman's Creeps, David Fennario's On the Job, and premieres of Michel Tremblay's plays in translation, as well as Shakespeare plays in the Malkin Bowl in Stanley Park. The long running Jacques Brel is Alive and Well and Living in Paris cemented the Arts Club's identity in its early years.

The 250-seat Seymour Street Theatre was instrumental in launching the careers of Canadian performers, including Michael J. Fox, Bruce Greenwood, Ruth Nicol, Janet Wright, Winston Rekert, Lally Cadeau, and Brent Carver. Additionally, new works by playwrights like Nicola Cavendish, Morris Panych, Sherman Snukal, Anne Mortifee, and John Lazarus premiered at this theatre.

Just seven years into Millerd's time at the company, the Arts Club expanded to include performances at the 450-seat Granville Island Stage on Granville Island in 1979. Across the street, the smaller 193-seat Revue Stage in 1983.

The 1990s were a time of major transition for the company. In 1991, the Seymour Street Theatre was closed for demolition and is now the site of the Vancouver International Film Centre. Six years later, in 1997, the Revue Stage was leased to the Vancouver TheatreSports League for 13 years, before re-opening as an Arts Club stage in 2010.

In 1998, the Arts Club took over operations at the 650-seat Stanley Theatre (renamed the Stanley Industrial Alliance Stage in 2005), a former movie theater, located on Granville Street, a high traffic area of Vancouver. Now considered the company's main venue, it allowed the Arts Club to produce larger musicals like Les Miserables, Mary Poppins, Beauty and the Beast and Billy Elliot. The purchase and renovation of the new theatre cost nearly $9 million, almost three times the company's annual operating budget at the time. However, in the first season at the Stanley, the company's revenues nearly doubled, taking in more than the rival Vancouver Playhouse for the first time. The following year, company revenue went over $8 million and has not dropped below that point since.

In 2015, the Arts Club closed the Revue Stage and moved all programming to the 250-seat Goldcorp Stage at the BMO Theatre Centre in Olympic Village. A shared space with Bard on the Beach, the BMO Theatre Centre has four large rehearsal studios, wardrobe facilities for both companies, offices, and a state-of-the-art studio theatre space.

By 2016, largely due to Millerd's leadership, the company was producing up to 18 productions per year, had an annual budget of over $16 million, and an audience of over 255,000 patrons per year. On February 20, 2017, Millerd announced his retirement at the end of the 2017/2018 season. On June 28, 2017, the company announced that Ashlie Corcoran would take over as artistic director for the 2018–2019 season.

== Leadership ==
=== Artistic directors ===
- Yvonne Firkins (1964–1966)
- Bill Millerd (1972–2018)
- Ashlie Corcoran (2018–Present)

=== Artistic director emeritus ===
Currently the artistic director emeritus, Bill Millerd was the artistic managing director from 1972–2018, the longest-serving artistic director of a theatre company in Canada. During his time with the company, Millerd expanded the Arts Club's operations to include year-round programming and regional and national tours. Millerd oversaw the construction of the Granville Island Stage, the Revue Stage, the reopening of the historic Stanley Theatre, and the BMO Theatre Centre. During his tenure, over 600 plays were produced, over 100 of which Millerd has directed himself. Millerd is a governor of the National Theatre School of Canada, has received both a Jessie Richardson Theatre Award for Career Achievement and the Mayor's Arts Award, and is a member of the Order of Canada. He has been awarded an Alumni Award of Distinction and an honorary Doctor of Letters degree from UBC, and was presented with a Lifetime Achievement Award from Tourism Vancouver. On February 20, 2017, Millerd announced his plans to retire at the end of the 2017/2018 season.

=== Executive directors ===
- Howard Jang (2000–2014)
- Peter Cathie White (2014–Present)

== Education and Engagement ==
The Arts Club offers a variety of education programs designed for individuals and groups of all ages, including students, educators, artists, and community members. From talkbacks and the Sunday Salon series to in-school workshops and theatre training, the Arts Club continues to broaden and diversify its educational programming in order to deliver meaningful and effective learning opportunities. This programming focuses on four key pillars: diversity, accessibility, fostering creativity, and building communities. The Arts Club also encourages students to create theatrical work about themes that are socially and culturally relevant to them. Education and Engagement officially became a department in 2015, with designated administrative staff to run the three existing programs: the Musical Theatre Intensive (started in 2002), LEAP—Learning Early About Playwriting (2006), and the Actor’s Intensive (2010). Since then, programming has expanded rapidly, now including programs such as Creative Teens, The Arts Club Drama Outreach program, and a large range of adult programming. The Arts Club has been developing a stronger focus on accessibility, with the addition of an Accessibility Coordinator in 2021, and now offers relaxed performances, open captioning, and educational opportunities for disability communities.

== Notable productions ==
=== 1964–1979 ===
- Light Up the Sky by Moss Hart, the first production in the Seymour Street Theatre (1964).
- Now Mercutio, Bill Millerd's first show with the company as a stage manager, at the Seymour Street Theatre (1970).
- Jacques Brel is Alive and Well and Living in Paris, first musical produced by the company, ran for seven months, with Brent Carver in the cast, at the Seymour Street Theatre (1972).
- The Incredible Murder of Cardinal Tosca by Alden Nowlan and Walter Learning, premiere, first production at the Granville Island Stage (1979).

=== 1980–1997 ===
- Tom Foolery by Tom Lehrer, directed by Geoff Ferris, at the Granville Island Stage (1981).
- Talking Dirty by Sherman Snukal, the first premiere of a new Canadian play, at the Seymour Street Theatre (1981).
- A Musical Evening with Ruth Nichol and Leon Bibb, first production at the Revue Stage (1983).
- Ain't Misbehavin' by Murray Horwitz and Richard Maltby, Jr., ran for two years at the Revue Stage (1984–85).
- It's Snowing on Saltspring by Nicola Cavendish, premiere, remounted numerous times, at the Seymour Street Theatre (1985).
- 7 Stories by Morris Panych, world premiere, directed by Panych, at the Granville Island Stage (1989).
- A Closer Walk with Patsy Cline by Dean Regan, world premiere, at the Revue Stage (1991).
- The Ends of the Earth by Morris Panych, world premiere, won the Governor General's Award for Drama, at the Granville Island Stage (1992).
- Mom's the Word by Barbara Pollard, Deborah Williams, Jill Daum, Alison Kelly, Robin Nichol, and Linda A. Carson, toured to Australia and London, at the Revue Stage (1995).
- Taking Steps by Alan Ayckbourn, with Colin Mochrie as Mark, at Granville Island Stage (1995).

=== 1998–2015 ===
- Swing by Dean Regan, with Michael Bublé in the cast, the first production at the Stanley Theatre (1998).
- Girl in the Goldfish Bowl by Morris Panych, world premiere, with Zachary Ansley, won the Governor General's Award for Drama, at the Granville Island Stage (2002).
- The Matka King by Anosh Irani, world premiere, at the Granville Island Stage (2003).
- Mom's the Word 2: Unhinged by Barbara Pollard, Deborah Williams, Jill Daum, Alison Kelly, and Robin Nichol, world premiere, at the Granville Island Stage (2005).
- Glengarry Glen Ross by David Mamet, with Eric McCormack and Brian Markinson, at the Stanley Industrial Alliance Stage (2009).
- Les Miserables by Claude-Michel Schönberg, highest grossing production ever, at the Stanley Industrial Alliance Stage (2009).
- Don Quixote by Colin Heath and Peter Anderson, world premiere, co-production with Centaur Theatre Company and Axis Theatre Company, directed by Roy Surette, at the Granville Island Stage (2010).
- Hairspray by Marc Shaiman, Scott Wittman, Mark O'Donnell, and Thomas Meehan, actor Jay Brazeau suffered a stroke 30 minutes before curtain and was replaced by Andy Toth for 36 performances before Brazeau returned to the production, at the Stanley Industrial Alliance Stage (2011).
- Do You Want What I Have Got? A Craigslist Cantata by Bill Richardson and Veda Hille, at the Revue Stage (2012).

=== 2015–present ===
- Onegin by Veda Hille and Amiel Gladstone, world premiere, winner of a record 10 Jessie Richardson Theatre Awards, at the Goldcorp Stage at the BMO Theatre Centre (2016), on tour across Western Canada, and Granville Island Stage (2017).
- Angels in America by Tony Kushner, directed by Kim Collier, with Brian Markinson and Gabrielle Rose, at the Stanley Industrial Alliance Stage (2017).
- The Piano Teacher by Dorothy Dittrich, world premiere, commissioned by the Arts Club, winner of the 2022 Governor General’s Award for English Language Drama, directed by Yvette Nolan, with Megan Leitch as Erin, at the Goldcorp Stage at the BMO Theatre Centre (2017).
- Thanks for Giving by Kevin Loring, world premiere, commissioned by the Arts Club, directed by Loring, with Margo Kane as Nan, at the Granville Island Stage (2017).
- Forgiveness by Hiro Kanagawa, adapted from the memoir Forgiveness: A Gift from my Grandparents by Mark Sakamoto, world premiere, co-commissioned and co-produced by the Arts Club and Theatre Calgary, directed by Stafford Arima, at the Stanley Industrial Alliance Stage (2023).

== Gallery ==
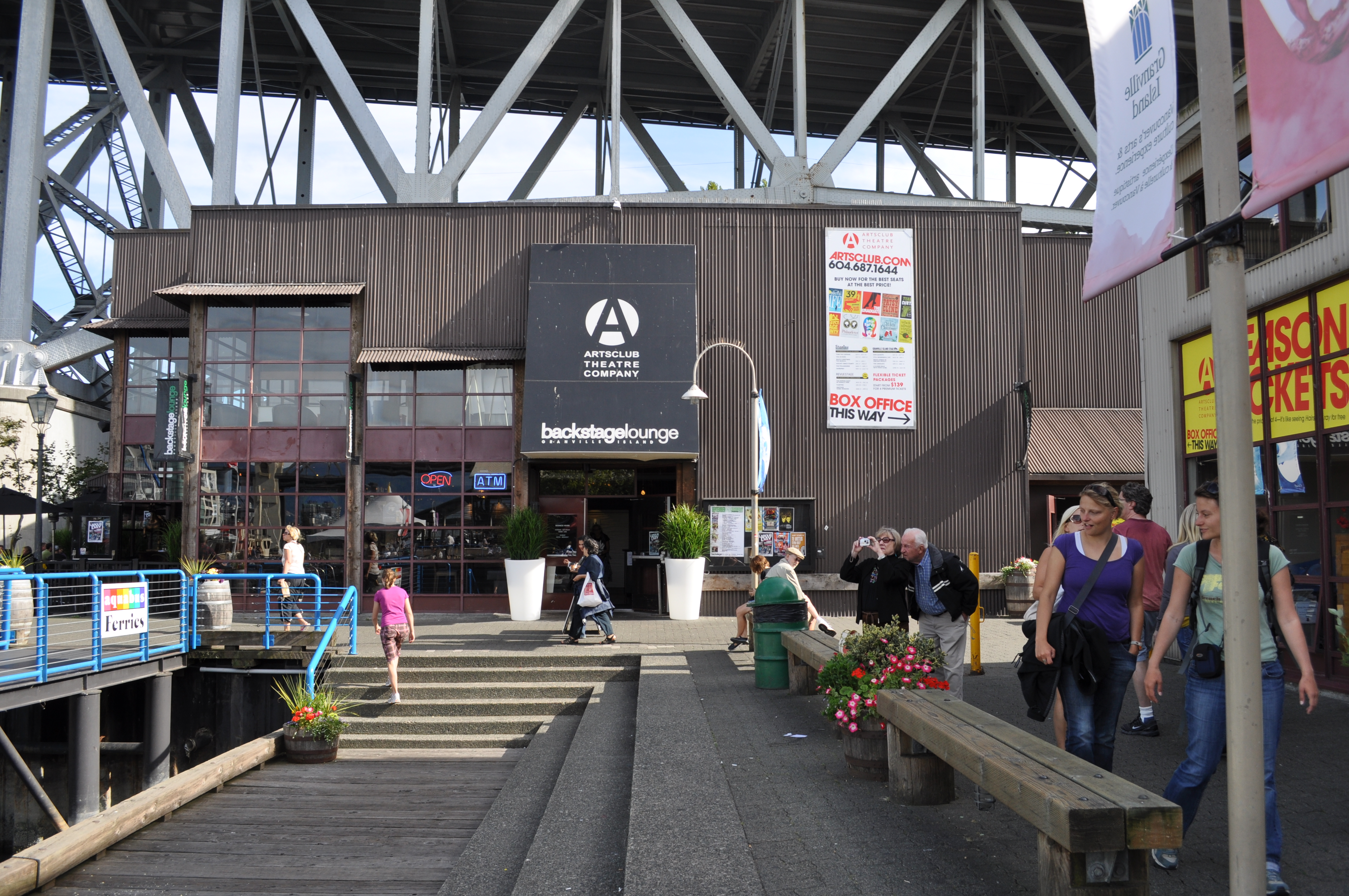
Granville Island Stage Exterior

== See also ==
- Stanley Industrial Alliance Stage
- Theatre of Canada
- Bard on the Beach
- Vancouver Playhouse Theatre Company
- Firehall Arts Centre
