= Morris Panych =

Canadian playwright, director and actor (born 1952)

- Born: Morris Stephen Panych; 1952 (age 73–74); Calgary, Alberta, Canada
- Occupations: Playwright, Director, Actor
- Partner: Ken MacDonald
- Writing career
- Notable works: 7 Stories, Vigil, The Dishwashers, Lawrence & Holloman, Girl in the Goldfish Bowl
- Website: www.kenandmorris.com

Morris Stephen Panych (born 30 June 1952) is a Canadian playwright, director and actor.

== Early life ==
Panych was born in Calgary, Alberta, and grew up in Edmonton, Alberta. He studied at Northern Alberta Institute of Technology, and the University of British Columbia.

== Plays ==
- Co$t of Living (1991)
- The Ends of the Earth (1994)
- Vigil (1996) (adapted for the British stage as Auntie and Me)

Vigil played at the Belfry Theatre in Victoria, British Columbia (15 November - 11 December 2022) and Panych is described on the playbill as one of Canada's "most prolific and idiosyncratic playwrights – and one of the very best. I love his plays – and his characters. So many of them approach the world with disdain and skepticism. But despite their best efforts – they can't help finding the good in other people." This work is best described as a very funny black comedy.

- Lawrence & Holloman
- Girl in the Goldfish Bowl (2003)
- Earshot
- 7 Stories
- Dishwashers
- Still Laughing: Three Adaptations by Morris Panych (2009), Panych's adaptations of:
  - The Government Inspector by Nikolai Gogol
  - Hotel Peccadillo by Georges Feydeau and Mauric Desvallières
  - The Amorous Adventures of Anatol by Arthur Schnitzler
- The Trespassers (2010)
- Gordon (2011)
- In Absentia (2012)
- The Shoplifters (2014)
- Sextet (2014)
- The Waiting Room (2015)

He has directed nearly one hundred theatre and opera productions, including most of his own works, and the Prix Italia nominated The Overcoat, plus several music videos and Da Vinci's Inquest. He won the 1994 Governor General's Award for Drama for The Ends of the Earth, and the 2004 Governor General's Award for Drama for Girl in the Goldfish Bowl.

In 2020, he created and wrote the web series Hey Lady!, starring Jayne Eastwood, for CBC Gem.

Panych self-published his first novel, And So Forth Friesen Press in 2026

== Personal life ==
Panych married his longtime partner, Ken MacDonald, in 2004.
