= Jessie Richardson Theatre Award =

Jessie Award
- Current: 38th Jessie Awards
- Awarded for: Excellence in Vancouver theatre
- Country: Canada
- Presented by: Jessie Richardson Theatre Award Society
- First award: 1982
- Website: http://www.jessieawards.com/

The Jessie Richardson Theatre Award (commonly known as the Jessie Awards) is given to recognize achievement in professional theatre in Vancouver, British Columbia. The Jessies are presented by the Jessie Richardson Theatre Award Society, at an annual ceremony. The awards are named after Jessie Richardson, co-founder of the Playhouse Holiday Theatre, local actor, director and designer.

The rules for the Jessie Awards are set forth by the Jessie Review Committee each year, which applies for each season only.

== Awards ==
=== 2019 ===
Large Theatre

- Outstanding Performance by an Actor – Large Theatre: Félix Beauchamp, ‘’Le Soulier’’, Théâtre la Seizième
- Outstanding Performance by an Actress – Large Theatre: Colleen Wheeler, Timon of Athens, Bard on the Beach Shakespeare Festival
- Outstanding Performance by an Actor in a Supporting Role – Large Theatre: Adam Grant Warren, Kill Me Now, Touchstone Theatre
- Outstanding Performance by an Actress in a Supporting Role – Large Theatre: Nora McLellan, The Matchmaker, Arts Club Theatre Company
- Outstanding Lighting Design – Large Theatre: Itai Erdal, The Curious Incident of the Dog in the Night-Time, Arts Club Theatre Company
- Outstanding Set Design – Large Theatre: Drew Facey, Timon of Athens, Bard on the Beach Shakespeare Festival
- Outstanding Costume Design – Large Theatre: Barbara Clayden, Lysistrata, Bard on the Beach Shakespeare Festival
- Outstanding Sound Design or Original Composition – Large Theatre: Malcolm Dow, Le Soulier, Théâtre la Seizième
- Georgia Straight Outstanding Direction – Large Theatre: Esther Duquette & Gilles Poulin-Denis, Le Soulier, Théâtre la Seizième
- Outstanding Production – Large Theatre: Kamloopa, The Cultch – (in partnership with Western Canada Theatre, Persephone Theatre and Gordon Tootoosis Nīkānīwin Theatre, and in collaboration with National Arts Centre Indigenous Theatre)
- Outstanding Production - Musical – Large Theatre: As You Like it, Bard on the Beach Shakespeare Festival
- Significant Artistic Achievement – Large Theatre: Kim Senklip Harvey & Lindsay Lachance, Kamloopa, The Cultch – (in partnership with Western Canada Theatre, Persephone Theatre and Gordon Tootoosis Nīkānīwin Theatre, and in collaboration with National Arts Centre Indigenous Theatre) for Outstanding decolonization of theatre spaces and practices.

Small Theatre

- Outstanding Performance by an Actor – Small Theatre: Warren Kimmel, Sweeney Todd: The Demon of Fleet Street, The Snapshots Collective
- Outstanding Performance by an Actress – Small Theatre: Colleen Winton, Sweeney Todd: The Demon of Fleet Street, The Snapshots Collective
- Outstanding Performance by an Actor in a Supporting Role – Small Theatre: Oliver Castillo, Sweeney Todd: The Demon of Fleet Street, The Snapshots Collective
- Outstanding Performance by an Actress in a Supporting Role – Small Theatre: Alannah Ong, The Ones We Leave Behind, Vancouver Asian Canadian Theatre
- Outstanding Lighting Design – Small Theatre: James Proudfoot, Camera Obscura (hungry ghosts) , the frank theatre company/Queer Arts Festival
- Outstanding Set Design – Small Theatre: Marshall McMahen, Les Filles du Roi, Fugue Theatre/Raven Theatre/Urban Ink/The Cultch
- Outstanding Costume Design – Small Theatre: Marshall McMahen & Konwahonwá:wi Stacey, Les Filles du Roi, Fugue Theatre/Raven Theatre/Urban Ink/The Cultch
- Outstanding Sound Design or Original Composition – Small Theatre: Corey Payette & Kyra Soko, Les Filles du Roi, Fugue Theatre/Raven Theatre/Urban Ink/The Cultch
- Outstanding Direction – Small Theatre: Corey Payette, Les Filles du Roi, Fugue Theatre/Raven Theatre/Urban Ink/The Cultch
- Outstanding Production – Small Theatre: Camera Obscura (hungry ghosts) , the frank theatre company/Queer Arts Festival
- Outstanding Production – Musical – Small Theatre: Sweeney Todd: The Demon of Fleet Street, The Snapshots Collective
- Significant Artistic Achievement – Small Theatre: Molly MacKinnon & Christine Quintana, Never the Last – Delinquent Theatre for Outstanding interdisciplinary collaboration involving the imaginative integration of dance, live musical performance and theatre

Theatre for Young Audiences

- Outstanding Performance – Theatre for Young Audiences: Jake Walker, Jack and the Magic Bean, Presentation House Theatre
- Outstanding Design – Theatre for Young Audiences: Shizuka Kai, Jessica Oostergo, Brad Trenaman, Salmon Girl – Raven Spirit Dance, Ensemble Design (set, costume, lighting)
- Outstanding Artistic Creation – Theatre for Young Audiences: Kayla Dunbar, Elephant & Piggie’s “We Are in a Play”, Carousel Theatre for Young People
- Outstanding Production – Theatre for Young Audiences: Elephant & Piggie’s “We Are in a Play”, Carousel Theatre for Young People
- Significant Artistic Achievement – Theatre for Young Audiences: Jack and the Magic Bean, Presentation House Theatre for Outstanding risky and improvised audience engagement

Additional Awards

- Outstanding Original Script: David Paquet, Le Soulier (The Shoe), Théâtre la Seizième
- Critic’s Choice Innovation Award: Lysistrata, Bard on the Beach Shakespeare Festival
- Vancouver Now Representation and Inclusion Award: Heather Redfern and The Cultch
- Patron of the Arts Award: Grant Burnyeat
- Mary Phillips Prize for Behind the Scenes Achievement: Stephane Kirkland
- Sam Payne Award for the Most Promising Newcomer: Taran Kootenhayoo
- John Moffat & Larry Lilo Prize: Andrew Wheeler
- GVPTA Career Achievement Award: David Diamond
- Sydney Risk Prize: Kamloopa by Kim Senklip Harvey
- Colin Campbell Award for Excellence in Technical Theatre: Adrian Muir
- Ray Michal Prize for Most Promising New Director: Marie Farsi

=== 2020 ===
2020 awards and nominations are from the following sources:

Large theatre

- Outstanding Performance by an Actress in a Lead Role: Deena Aziz, A Thousand Splendid Suns, |Arts Club Theatre Company (in partnership with Royal Manitoba Theatre Centre)
- Outstanding Performance by an Actor in a Lead Role: Robert Salvador, Best of Enemies, Pacific Theatre
- Outstanding Performance by an Actress in a Supporting Role: Tess Degenstein, Noises Off, Arts Club Theatre Company
- Outstanding Performance by an Actor in a Supporting Role: John Ullyatt, Mathilda, Arts Club Theatre Company (in partnership with Citadel Theatre & Royal Manitoba Theatre Centre)
- Outstanding Set Design: Drew Facey, Cost of Living, Arts Club Theatre Company (in partnership with Citadel Theatre)
- Outstanding Costume Design: Cory Sincennes, Shakespeare in Love, Bard on the Beach Shakespeare Festival
- Outstanding Sound Design or Original Composition: Alessandro Juliani, The Great Leap, Arts Club Theatre Company
- Outstanding Production - Play: Noises Off, Arts Club Theatre Company
- Outstanding Production - Musical: Sound of Music, Arts Club Theatre Company

Significant Artistic Achievement

- Outstanding Innovative and Immersive Storytelling: Alley Theatre and Touchstone Theatre, Inheritance: A Pick-The-Path Experience Alley (in association with Vancouver Moving Theatre and Community Partnership with Vancouver Aboriginal Friendship Centre)
- Outstanding Projection Design: Chimerik 似不像, The Great Leap, Arts Club Theatre Company
- Outstanding Video and Projection Design: Emily Soussana, Chief Lady Bird, Chrystal Sparrow, & Carrielynn Victor, Skyborn: A Land Reclamation Odyssey, Savage Society (presented by The Cultch)
- Outstanding Choreography: Tara Cheyenne Friedenberg, Cipher, Arts Club Theatre Company (in partnership with Vertigo Theatre)
- Outstanding Audience Engagement Through the Use of Technology: Théâtre la Seizième, Le NoShow, Vancouver Théâtre la Seizième (in partnership with Théâtre DuBunker and le Collectif Nous Sommes ici (Québec)

Small theatre

- Outstanding Performance by an Actress in a Lead Role: Jillian Fargey, The Father, The Search Party
- Outstanding Performance by an Actor in a Lead Role: Kevin McNulty, The Father, The Search Party
- Outstanding Performance by an Actress in a Supporting Role: Elizabeth Kirkland, The Sea, Slamming Door Artist Collective
- Outstanding Performance by an Actor in a Supporting Role: Chris Francisque, Superior Donuts, Ensemble Theatre Company
- Outstanding Lighting Design: Itai Erdal, The Father, The Search Party
- Outstanding Set Design: Amir Ofek, The Father, The Search Party
- Outstanding Costume Design: Christina Sinosich & Donnie Tejani, Company, Raincity Theatre
- Outstanding Sound Design or Original Composition: Rick Colhoun, Frankenstein: Lost in Darkness, Wireless Wings Radio Ensemble
- Outstanding Direction: Mindy Parfitt, The Father, The Search Party
- Outstanding Production: The Father, The Search Party
- Outstanding Production - Musical: Company, Raincity Theatre

Significant Artistic Achievement:

- Outstanding ensemble performance: Caitlin Clugston, Graham Coffeng, Nick Fontaine, Janet Gigliotti, Alex Gullason, Warren Kimmel, Steve Maddock, Jennie Neumann, Anthony Santiago, Madeleine Suddaby, Jennifer Suratos, Lindsay Ann Warnock, Jonathan Winsby, Katey Wright; Company, Raincity Theatre
- Outstanding transformation of space and audience immersion: Deep into Darkness, Third Wheel Productions
- Outstanding musical direction: Sean Bayntun, Herringbone, Patrick Street Productions
- Outstanding integrity in casting: Transcripts, Part I: The Women, Zee Zee Theatre and The Frank Theatre, (in partnership with Firehall Arts Centre)

Theatre for Young Audiences

- Outstanding Performance: Marlene Ginader, Bad Hats Theatre’s Peter Pan Carousel Theatre for Young People
- Outstanding Design: Jay Dodge (Video Design), Iron Peggy, Vancouver International Children’s Festival and Boca del Lupo
- Outstanding Artistic Creation: Ian Harmon (Direction), Love You Forever and More, Munsch Beach House Theatre
- Outstanding Production: Th’owxiya: The Hungry Feast Dish, Axis Theatre Company
- Significant Artistic Achievement: Outstanding stage management, Jillian Perry, Th’owxiya: The Hungry Feast Dish,|Axis Theatre Company

Other

- Outstanding Original Script: Jan Derbyshire, Certified, Touchstone Theatre
- Critic's Choice Innovation Award: Certified, Touchstone Theatre

Special Awards

- Patron of the Arts Awards: Ken Gracie & Phillip Waddell
- GVPTA Career Achievement Awards: Wendy Bross Stuart
- Sam Payne Award for Most Promising Newcomer: Heather Barr
- Mary Phillips Award for Behind-the-Scene Achievement: Conor Moore
- Sidney J. Risk Prize for Outstanding Original Script by an Emerging Playwright: Derek Chan, Chicken Girl
- Ray Michal Prize for Outstanding Work and/or Body of Work by an Emerging Director: Chris Lam
- John Moffat & Larry Lillo Prize: Gerry Mackay
- Vancouver Now Presentation and Inclusion Award: Heidi Taylor
- Colin Campbell Award for Excellence in Technical Theatre: Elia Kirby
- Gordon Armstrong Playwright's Rent Award: Deborah Williams & The Flame

== See also ==
- Elizabeth Sterling Haynes Award
- Dora Mavor Moore Award
- Dora Audience Choice Award
- Floyd S. Chalmers Canadian Play Award
