= Marc Strange =

Canadian actor (1941–2012)

- Born: July 24, 1941; Vankleek Hill, Ontario, Canada
- Died: May 20, 2012 (aged 70); Toronto, Ontario, Canada
- Occupations: Actor; producer; writer
- Spouse: Lynn Susan
- Children: Sarah Strange, Josh Strange

Marc Strange (July 24, 1941 – May 20, 2012) was a Canadian actor, producer and writer. He and his wife, Lynn Susan, were the co-creators of CBC Television's longest running series, The Beachcombers.

== Career ==
Strange dropped out of high school and worked on a tobacco farm before trying acting. He appeared in the television film The Paper People. He starred opposite Genevieve Bujold in the role of Jason, in the 1968 film Isabel. After playing some supporting roles he returned to Canada, where he and his wife were to write the first episodes of The Beachcombers, a series he was associated with, for its entire 19-year run, drafting its final episode.

Strange also wrote award-winning mystery novels. His 2010 novel Body Blows won an Edgar Award. His hockey ballad The Last of the Bare-Faced Goolies was read twice on CBC radio, once by Bruno Gerussi, and once by himself.

Jackson Davies, a longtime Beachcombers cast member who went on to become a producer himself, and co-wrote a history of the show with Strange, called Strange a "Renaissance man". Strange put his final touches on their book days before his death from cancer. The book was published to mark the series' 40th anniversary, and was published in 2013.

== Filmography ==
=== Acting ===
==== Film ====
Year	Title	Role	Notes
1968	Isabel	Jason	
1986	The Morning Man	Det. John Mailer	
1987	Blindside	Hawk	
1987	The Big Town	Madigan	
1991	Run	Chief Travers	
1993	Cold Sweat	Dr. Kellar	
1995	Tommy Boy	'Toy-Car' Executive	
1999	Ghosts of the Rain Forest	Narrator	Documentary
2002	Jane Goodall's Wild Chimpanzees	Narrator	Documentary
2008	One Week	Art Carey	
2010	Oliver Sherman	Raymond Saddler	

==== Television ====
Year	Title	Role	Notes
1963–1965	The Forest Rangers	1st Engineer / Hank / Charlie Snell	4 episodes
1965	Seaway	Thaddeus Rybak	Episode: "Border Incident"
1967	Hatch's Mill	Saul Hatch	Episode: "The Contest"
1967	Festival	Jamie Taylor	Episode: "The Paper People"
1968	Shadow on the Land	Maj. Shepherd McCloud	Television film
1969	Adventures in Rainbow Country	Wilbur Massey	Episode: "Roar of the Hornet"
1970–1971	The Manipulators	Rick Nicholson	9 episodes
1984	Kate Morris Vice President	Ross	Television film
1985	For the Record	John Maclin	Episode: "Tools of the Devil"
1985, 1988	Night Heat	Dr. Gold / Nelson	2 episodes
1985	Shellgame	Mitchell	Television film
1985	Jimmy Valentine	O. Henry	Television film
1986	Act of Vengeance	Pete	Television film
1986	Adderly	Camillo	Episode: "Capture the Flag"
1987	Hoover vs. The Kennedys	Clyde Tolson	2 episodes
1987–1989	Street Legal	Denis Tourangeau / Edmund Purvis	2 episodes
1988	Betrayal of Silence	Brother Thomas	Television film
1989	Love and Hate	Ed Swayze	Television film
1990, 1992	E.N.G.	Mr. Logan / Detective Barnes	2 episodes
1992	Tropical Heat	Collingswood	Episode: "Party Girl"
1992	Teamster Boss: The Jackie Presser Story	Garrity	Television film
1992	Forever Knight	Inspector Fiori	Episode: "Dead Issue"
1992–1996	X-Men: The Animated Series	Forge	20 episodes; voice
1993	Counterstrike	Balinger	Episode: "The Raw Truth"
1993	Shattered Trust: The Shari Karney Story	Philip Fowler	Television film
1993	Dieppe	Dwight D. Eisenhower	Television film
1996	Gridlock	Joe Gorsky	Television film
1996	Undue Influence	Judge	Television film
1998	Silver Surfer	Lord Glenn	4 episodes
1998	Highlander: The Raven	Ludwig Weiss	Episode: "Cloak and Daggar"
1998–1999	Traders	Leo Baker	5 episodes
1999	Mythic Warriors	Old Nomad	Episode: "Cadmus and Europa"
2003	Beat Cops	Lieutenant	Television film
2005	Slings & Arrows	Mr. Henderson	Episode: "Birnam Wood"
2005	Murdoch Mysteries	Judge Pedlow	Episode: "Under the Dragon's Tail"
2006–2007	ReGenesis	Toumas Sandstrom	8 episodes
2007	In God's Country	The Prophet	Television film
2008	Anne of Green Gables: A New Beginning	Mr. Harding	Television film
2010	Rookie Blue	Walter Froug	Episode: "Mercury Retrograde"

==== Video games ====
Year	Title	Role	Notes
1999	X-Men: Mutant Academy 2	Forge	Voice

=== Directing ===
==== Television ====
Year	Title	Notes
1971	The Manipulators	Episode: "The Flock"; also writer
1987	Street Legal	Episode: "A Little Knowledge"
1989–1990	The Beachcombers	5 episodes

=== Writing ===
==== Television ====
Year	Title	Notes
1972–1990	The Beachcombers	Creator and writer
1978	Leo and Me	Staff writer
1980	Huckleberry Finn and His Friends	Episode: "Huck Becomes the Victim"
1986	The Campbells	2 episodes
1986, 1988	Danger Bay	2 episodes
1987	Street Legal	3 episodes
1995	Frostfire	Television film
2002	The New Beachcombers	Television film
2004	A Beachcombers Christmas	Television film
