= Eli Gabay =

Canadian actor

- Born: June 1, 1959 (age 66); Toronto, Ontario, Canada
- Other names: Eli Gabe
- Occupation: Actor
- Years active: 1986–present

Eli Gabay (also credited as Eli Gabe; born June 1, 1959) is a Canadian actor.

He is known for voicing Quetzal, the teacher at School in the Sky, as well as voicing Max and Emmy's father, in Dragon Tales. He voices a gangster named Abrego in the anime, Black Lagoon. Gabay loaned his voice in other anime such as Earth Maiden Arjuna, Master Keaton and Shakugan No Shana.

Besides animation, Gabay has played live-action roles such as Miguel in Bordello of Blood, the pilot in The Edge and Carlos in the NC-17 movie Bliss. Gabay has also appeared in TV shows, such as The Commish and ReGenesis.

== Filmography ==
Eli Gabay film and television credits
Year	Title	Role	Notes	Ref.
1989	My Secret Identity	Unknown	1 episode	
1991	Counterstrike	Unknown	Episode: "Hidden Assets"	
1992	Highlander: The Series	Devereux	Episode "Free Fall" (S1.E5)	
1992	The Commish	Brett Connors	Episode: "Escape"	
1993	Counterstrike	Unknown	Episode: "The Contender"	
1993	The Sea Wolf	Dogbreath, Helmsman	Television film	
1993	A Stranger in the Mirror	Koko / Young Man 1	Television film	
1993	Born Too Soon	Writer	Television film	
1993	Sherlock Holmes Returns	Lt. Ortega	Television film	
1994	Intersection	Step Magazine	Theatrical film	
1994	Car 54, Where Are You?	Henchman #2	Theatrical film	
1994	Green Dolphin Beat	Morales	Television film	
1994	The Commish	Rudy Mendoza	Episodes: "Against the Wind" (parts 1 & 2)	
1996	Sliders	La Migra	1 episode	
1997	Bliss	Carlos	Theatrical film	
1997	Bordello of Blood	Miguel	Theatrical film	
1998–2000	Master Keaton	Hunter (voice)		
1999–2005	Dragon Tales	Quetzal / Emmy and Max's father (voice)	Regular cast	
1997	The Edge	Jet Pilot	Theatrical film	
1998	Loyal Opposition: Terror in the White House	Hobson	Television film	
1998	Cold Squad	Det. Larry Iredell	11 episodes	
1998	The Outer Limits	Faber	1 episode	
1998	Dead Man's Gun	Garcia	1 episode	
1999	Assault on Death Mountain	Jamal	Television film	
1999–2000	Roswell Conspiracies: Aliens, Myths and Legends	(additional voices)	Regular cast	
2000	Andromeda	Captain Ismael Khalid	Episode: "The Banks of the Lethe"	
2001	Special Unit 2	Wesley the Fire Devil	1 episode	
2001	Earth Maiden Arjuna	Juna's Father (voice)	Japanese anime	
2002	He Sees You When You're Sleeping	Junior Badgett	Television film	
2004	Evel Knievel	Arum	Television film	
2004	Tetsujin 28	Col. Spencer (voice)	Japanese anime	
2004	ReGenesis	John Ricci	2 episodes	
2005–2006	Shakugan No Shana	Sydonay (voice)	Season 1. Japanese light novel series	
2006	Dr. Dolittle 3	Rodeo Steer / Rodeo Bull (voice)	Theatrical film	
2008	Little Girl Lost: The Delimar Vera Story	Detective Eddie Gutierrez	Television film	
2008	To Love and Die in L.A.	Unknown	Television film	
2010	Black Lagoon	Abrego, Neo Nazi Soldier (voice)	2 episodes	
2010–2013	The Devil You Know	Narrator	Regular cast	
2018	DC's Legends of Tomorrow	Chuck McCabe	1 episode	
2019	A Feeling of Home (Heart of Texas)	Chef	Television film	
2019	Love and Sunshine	Ricky	Television film	
2019	The Art of Racing in the Rain	Student	Theatrical film	
2020	Fashionably Yours	Nick	Television film	
2020	A Sugar & Spice Holiday	Stavros	Television film	
2021	Secrets of a Gold Digger Killer	Steven Beard	Television film	
2022	Always Amore	Senore Petrunti	Television film	

== Video games ==
Eli Gabay video game credits
Year	Title	Role	Notes	Ref.
2000	Kessen	Tadakatsu Honda (voice)	Video game	
2002	Dragon Tales: Dragon Frog Jamboree	Quetzal (voice)	Video game	
2003	Homeworld 2	Fleet Intelligence (voice)	Video game	
2004	Dragon Tales: Learn & Fly With Dragons	Quetzal (voice)	Video game	
