= Must Be Santa =

Must Be Santa may refer to:

- Must Be Santa (film), a 1999 Canadian television film
- Must Be Santa (song), a Christmas song, covered by Bob Dylan
