= Charlene Aleck =

Canadian actor

- Born: 10 August 1969 (age 56); Vancouver, British Columbia, Canada
- Occupations: actor, politician
- Years active: 1976–1990, 2002
- Spouse: Tony Hyland (m. 1992)
- Children: 4

Charlene Aleck (born August 10, 1969) is a Canadian actress and First Nations councilor in British Columbia.

== Early life ==
Aleck was born in Vancouver, British Columbia to Joe Aleck and Irene Hilary George and grew up in Mission, British Columbia alongside five siblings. She is the granddaughter of actor and Tsleil-Waututh leader Chief Dan George.

== Career ==
She was a cast member of the CBC television series The Beachcombers (as Sara Jim and Rose) and the made-for-TV movie The New Beachcombers.

After ending her acting career she became a cultural preschool teacher and served four terms as council member of the Tsleil-Waututh First Nation and spokesperson for TWN Sacred Trust Initiative.

Aleck has been a vocal opponent of the Kinder Morgan Trans Mountain pipeline, citing its potential risks to the land of the Tsleil-Waututh.
