= Rae Brown =

Canadian actress

Rae Brown (March 13, 1913 – December 8, 2000) was a Canadian actress, best known for her longtime role as restaurateur Molly Carmody, the owner of Molly's Reach, in the television series The Beachcombers.

Born in Nelson, British Columbia and raised in Vancouver, she began her career as an actress in the 1940s with stage appearances in Vancouver, later branching out into radio, film and television. She married fellow actor Douglas Brown in 1944.

Her other roles included the television series Pacific 13, Friday Island, Cariboo Country and The Manipulators, the theatrical feature films The Trap and That Cold Day in the Park, and theatrical roles including The Killing of Sister George, Anastasia, the original 1967 stage production of The Ecstasy of Rita Joe and the 1963 production of The Hostage that inaugurated the new Vancouver Playhouse Theatre Company.

Molly in The Beachcombers had originally been conceived as a younger single mother, but the producers ultimately chose to cast Brown in the role, rewriting her as a grandmother, to avoid the possibility of sexual tension developing between Molly and Bruno Gerussi's Nick Adonidas. Brown continued in the role through the 1970s, despite suffering from arthritis so painful that she could barely walk without canes. She remained in the role until 1986, concluding in a special two-part episode in which Molly achieved unexpected success as a romance novelist, selling Molly's Reach to a new owner and leaving town to embark on an international book tour, although Brown returned for a guest appearance in the series finale in 1990.

She died in December 2000, and was later inducted into the BC Entertainment Hall of Fame.
