= The Ecstasy of Rita Joe =

Play by George Ryga

The Ecstasy of Rita Joe is a drama by George Ryga. The play, in two acts, premiered at the Vancouver Playhouse, November 23, 1967. It was directed by George Bloomfield. The play has an important place in the history of modern Canadian theatre, as it was one of the first to address issues relating to Indigenous people. It recounts the story of a young Indigenous woman in the city.

The play opened the studio theatre of the National Arts Centre in 1969. It was adapted and choreographed as a ballet by Norbert Vesak (commissioned by the Manitoba Indian Brotherhood) and first performed by the Royal Winnipeg Ballet on July 27, 1971 in Ottawa. The play was revived by Alberta Theatre Projects in 1976. It was translated by Gratien Gélinas and presented at the Comédie-Canadienne. It was also produced in Washington, DC, in May, 1973, with Chief Dan George and Frances Hyland in lead roles.

== Significance ==
The play's structure will be seen by some as clumsy at times while others may appreciate the postmodern disordering of events. The story is told in songs, montages and tableaus. While the causes of the plight of Aboriginal people are not shown in sharp relief, it is clear that the violence of white culture is at the root of the problem. The Canadian Theatre Encyclopedia which calls the play "seminal in the history of Canadian theatre," considered it to be more historically significant than meritorious in its own right:

[It is] not great for what it is as much as it is great for what it promises and what it offers the imaginative creative team... flashes of dramatic brilliance and also the historical aspect of the work's timing; this was one of the first works about Native Canadians mounted on a stage and taken seriously.

== Cast and crew ==
The Vancouver production starred Frances Hyland, August Schellenberg, Chief Dan George, Henry Ramer, Walter Marsh, Robert Clothier, Patricia Gage, Rae Brown, Claudine Melgrave, Bill Clarkson, Merv Campone, Alex Bruhanski, Jack Leaf, Jack Buttrey, Leonard George, Robert Hall, Frank Lewis, Paul Stanley, Willie Dunn and Ann Mortifee. Set and lighting were designed by Charles Evans, and costumes were designed by Margaret Ryan.

== Reviews ==
The critics dwelled on two major issues concerning Ryga's work: its structural problems and its power. Jack Richards of the Vancouver Sun voiced an opinion echoed by others: "I don't know if it is a great play. But if the role of the stage is to communicate... Ryga and... Bloomfield have accomplished their purpose." Jamie Portman of the Vancouver Province wrote of the revival in 1976: "...the play still worked. Rita Joe was a landmark in more ways than one. It was - and remains - a play for all seasons and for all peoples." The Washington Post was positive, but Julius Novick, of The New York Times wrote, "'Canadian Playwright.' The words seem a little incongrous together, like 'Panamanian hockey-player,' almost, or 'Lebanese fur-trapper.'"
