= Duncan Fraser (actor) =

Canadian actor

Duncan Fraser is a British-born Canadian actor. He is most noted for his performance in the 1985 film Overnight, for which he was a Genie Award nominee for Best Supporting Actor at the 7th Genie Awards in 1986, and his regular role as Staff Sgt. Regan in Da Vinci's Inquest, for which he was a Gemini Award nominee for Best Supporting Actor in a Drama Series at the 15th Gemini Awards in 2000.

== Early life and education ==
Born in Manchester, England, Fraser planned to study aeronautical engineering at the University of London, but switched to psychology after finding engineering too technical and mathematical.

== Career ==
Following university, Fraser travelled around the world for a number of years, before settling in the Vancouver area in 1974 and working as an actor. He spent a number of years as director of the Nanaimo Theatre Festival, and as associate director of Vancouver's Fend Players theatre company.

Fraser was also known for his regular television roles as Zack Denny in Bordertown, Mac McDougall in The Heights, Colonel Munro in Hawkeye, and Brian Brewster in Hope Island.

== Filmography ==
=== Film ===
Year	Title	Role	Notes
1986	Overnight	Arthur	
1987	Malone	Malone's Target	
1988	Watchers	Sheriff Gaines	
1989	The Fly II	Obstetrician	
1990	Deep Sleep	Delivery Man	
1990	The Reflecting Skin	Luke Dove	
1991	Mystery Date	Crully	
1992	North of Pittsburgh	Westcott	
1993	The Crush	Detective	
1993	Needful Things	Hugh Priest	
1994	Ernest Goes to School	Coach Decker	
1994	Crackerjack	Colonel Hardy	
1994	Andre	Jack Adams	
1994	Timecop	Irish Cop	
1994	Red Scorpion 2	Mr. Benjamin	
1995	Trust in Me	Lyle Volker	
1995	Cyberjack	Dr. Phillip Royce	
1996	Unforgettable	Michael Stratton	
1996	Alaska	Koontz	
1997	Seven Years in Tibet	British Officer	
1997	When Danger Follows You Home	Dr. Lensky	
1997	Silence	Father Chadwick	
1998	Wrongfully Accused	Sergeant McMacDonald	
1999	True Heart	Lloyd Nelson	
2000	The Guilty	Martin Corrigan	
2000	Cold Blooded	Chief Tompkins	
2000	The Claim	Crocker	
2001	Octopus 2: River of Fear	Mayor	
2003	Ben Hur	Messala	Voice
2003	The Hitcher II: I've Been Waiting	Buick Man	
2005	The Exorcism of Emily Rose	Dr. Cartwright	
2006	Eight Below	Captain Lovett	
2007	In the Name of the King	Old Man	
2011	Hamlet	Polonius	
2018	The Predator	VA Psych	
2019	Buddy Games	Bill	

=== Television ===
Year	Title	Role	Notes
1986	Spot Marks the X	Caretaker	Television film
1986, 1989	Danger Bay	Captain Burke / Carlson	2 episodes
1986	9B	U.K. Headmaster	Television film
1988	MacGyver	Bauman	Episode: "The Odd Triple"
1988	The Red Spider	Jefferson O'Day	Television film
1989–1991	Bordertown	Zachary Denny	59 episodes
1990	The Death of the Incredible Hulk	Tom Simpson	Television film
1990	Neon Rider	Stan Pierce	Episode: "Starting Over"
1991	21 Jump Street	Kevin Burnback	Episode: "In the Name of Love"
1991	Monkey House	Sergeant	Episode: "All the King's Horses"
1991	Omen IV: The Awakening	Father Mattson	Television film
1991	Captive	Nigel Crisp	Television film
1991	Max Glick	Mechanic	Episode: "Career Moves"
1992	Bill & Ted's Excellent Adventures	Theodoric	Episode: "Nail the Conquering Hero"
1992	Fatal Memories	George Franklin Sr.	Television film
1992	The Heights	Mac MacDougal	5 episodes
1992	Street Justice	Rafferty	Episode: "Back from the Dead Again"
1992	Call of the Wild	Red Fiske	Television film
1992, 1995	The Commish	Council Member #1 / Tom Schultz	2 episodes
1992–1996	Highlander: The Series	Various roles	3 episodes
1993	When a Stranger Calls Back	Club Owner	Television film
1993	The X-Files	Beatty	Episode: "Fire"
1993–1995	Madison	Roger Lemieux	4 episodes
1994	Snowbound: The Jim and Jennifer Stolpa Story	Don Patterson	Television film
1994–1995	Hawkeye	Colonel Monroe	5 episodes
1995	The Marshal	Tepper	Episode: "Pilot"
1996	Captains Courageous	Long Jack	Television film
1996	Sweet Dreams	Loggins	Television film
1996	Justice on Wheels: The Diana Kilmury Story	Tinhead	Television film
1996	To Brave Alaska	Wylie Bennett	Television film
1996, 1999	Viper	Various roles	2 episodes
1996, 2001	The Outer Limits	Coach Terni / General Post	2 episodes
1997	Dead Man's Gun	Big Paddy	Television film
1997	The Sentinel	Sheriff Tennyson	Episode: "Survival"
1997	Stargate SG-1	Professor Langford	Episode: "The Torment of Tantalus"
1997	Honey, I Shrunk the Kids: The TV Show	Jimmy Palmer	Episode: "Honey, I'm Haunted"
1997	Police Academy: The Series	Alonso Medford	Episode: "Mummy Dearest"
1997, 1998,1999	Dead Man's Gun	Boyd Medcalf / "Big Mike" McGreavey /Arthur Stephenson	3 episodes
1998–1999	Da Vinci's Inquest	Staff Sgt. Regan	13 episodes
1998, 2001	First Wave	Gen. Kendricks / Lieutenant	2 episodes
1999	The Jack Bull	Edsel Fraser	Television film
1999–2000	Hope Island	Brian / Holloway Brewster	22 episodes
2000	So Weird	Jonas Arrbee	Episode: "Carnival"
2001	The Miracle of the Cards	Dr. Farley Middleton	Television film
2002	K-9: P.I.	Frankie the Fence	Television film
2002	The New Beachcombers	George Rivers	Television film
2002	Snow Queen	Mayor	Miniseries
2002	The Investigation	George Karwaski	Television film
2003	Betrayed	Dr. Brooks	Television film
2003	Peacemakers	C.W. Wentworth	Episode: "A Town Without Pity"
2004	Traffic	Wayne Frazier	3 episodes
2004	The Life	McTavish	Television film
2006	The Collector	The Devil / Dutch Traveller	Episode: "The Alchemist"
2006	Broken Trail	Moncrieffe	Episode: "Part Two"
2006	Merlin's Apprentice	Sir Thomas	2 episodes
2007	Masters of Horror	Bearded Washingtonian	Episode: "The Washingtonians"
2008	The Lost Treasure of the Grand Canyon	Dr. Samual Jordan	Television film
2009	Storm in the Heartland	Hank Wilson	Television film
2009	The Guard	Father	Episode: "At Sea"
2010	Shattered	Roland Miller	2 episodes
2010	Sanctuary	Prime Minister	Episode: "For King and Country"
2010, 2015	Supernatural	Various roles	3 episodes
2013	Whisper of Fear	Colter	Television film
2013	The Killing	Raymond Seward Sr.	Episode: "Eminent Domain"
2014–2021	When Calls the Heart	Sam Collins	7 episodes
2019	Love on the Menu	George	Television film
2019	The InBetween	Captain Amos Scott	Episode: "The Devil's Refugee"
2019	V.C. Andrews' Heaven	Toby Casteel	Episode: "Fallen Hearts"
2019	Supergirl	Messenger	Episode: "Confidence Women"
2020	The Haunting of Bly Manor	Father of the Bride / Older Henry	2 episodes
2021	Home Before Dark	Harbour Master	Episode: "Dark Rooms"
2021	Heartland	Al Cotter	Episode: "Brand New Day"
