= Friday Island =

Friday Island may refer to:

== Places ==
- Friday Island, New Zealand
- Friday Island (Queensland)
- Friday Island, River Thames

== Other ==
- Friday Island (TV series), a 1962–1963 Canadian comedy-drama television series which aired on CBC
