= Murder in a Small Town (TV series) =

Canadian mystery-drama TV series (2024-present)

- Genre: Crime drama
- Created by: Ian Weir
- Based on: The Alberg and Cassandra Mysteries by L. R. Wright
- Starring: Rossif Sutherland; Kristin Kreuk; Mya Lowe; Aaron Douglas; Fritzy-Klevans Destine; Savonna Spracklin; Bethany Brown; Marcia Gay Harden
- Composer: James Jandrisch
- Country of origin: Canada
- Original language: English
- No. of seasons: 2
- No. of episodes: 18

Production
- Executive producers: Ian Weir; Milan Cheylov; Morris Ruskin; Amanda Tapping; Sharon J. Wisnia
- Producers: Crystal Remmey; Nick Orchard; Tina Pehme; Kim Roberts; Jeff Wachtel; Rossif Sutherland; Kristin Kreuk
- Production locations: Gibsons, British Columbia, Canada
- Running time: 42 minutes
- Production companies: Sepia Films; Soapbox Productions; Mojo; Future Shack Entertainment; Fox Entertainment; ITV Studios

Original release
- Network: Global (Canada); Fox (United States)
- Release: September 24, 2024 – present

Murder in a Small Town is a Canadian crime drama series which premiered on Global in Canada and Fox in the United States, on September 24, 2024. It is based on the Alberg and Cassandra Mysteries, a series of crime novels by L. R. Wright set in British Columbia. It is filmed in Gibsons on British Columbia's Sunshine Coast. In January 2025, the series was renewed for a second season, which premiered on September 23, 2025. In May 2026, the series was renewed for a third season.

== Cast and characters ==
=== Main ===
- Rossif Sutherland as Karl Alberg, a detective formerly of Minneapolis now serving as chief of police and solving murders in a small town in the Pacific Northwest.
- Kristin Kreuk as Cassandra Lee, a librarian who becomes a love interest for Alberg in the first episode
- Mya Lowe as Corporal Edwina Yen (season 1)
- Aaron Douglas as Sid Sokolowski, a police sergeant
- Fritzy-Klevans Destine as Andy Kendrick (season 1)
- Savonna Spracklin as Isabella Harbud
- Bethany Brown as Laila Jackson (season 2)
- Marcia Gay Harden as Christine Holman (season 2), mayor of Gibsons

=== Recurring ===
- Cassandra Sawtell as Steph Alberg, Alberg's daughter
- Dakota Guppy as Holly Alberg, Alberg's daughter
- Fiona Vroom as Phyllis Diaz
- Paloma Kwiatkowski as Bree
- Alisha Newton as Devon Travis
- Marci T. House as Angela Clyburn (season 2), medical examiner
- Jacob Shoemay as Brett Holman (season 2)
- Jodelle Ferland as Vanessa (season 2)

=== Special guest ===
- James Cromwell as George Wilcox
- Stana Katic as Zoe Strachan
- Devon Sawa as Gordon Murphy
- Erica Durance as Emma O'Brea
- Paula Patton as Elizabeth Lewis
- Lucas Bryant as Roger Galbraith
- Noah Reid as Tommy Cummins
- Joshua Close as Todd
- Gardiner Millar as Callum Hingle
- Quinten James as Jesse
- Tyler Posey as Ryan
- Camryn Manheim as Jocelyn Tait
- Jim Byrnes as Leland Bucholtz
- Malcolm-Jamal Warner as Richard Bannister
- William B. Davis as Darcy Stewart, a police captain

== Episodes ==
=== Series overview ===
Season	Episodes	Originally released	
Season	Episodes	First released	Last released
1	8	September 24, 2024	November 26, 2024
2	10	September 23, 2025	December 2, 2025

=== Season 1 (2024) ===
No. overall	No. in season	Title	Directed by	Written by	Original release date
1	1	"The Suspect"	Milan Cheylov	Ian Weir	September 24, 2024
Karl Alberg, a divorced man and father of two daughters, is the new Chief of Police in Gibsons, British Columbia. He starts dating the librarian Cassandra Lee. Cassandra is friends with George Wilcox, an elderly man who found the body of Carlyle Burke, his brother-in-law. Burke had frequently abused his late wife Audrey, Wilcox' twin sister, and when he invited Wilcox over for lunch and kept bad-mouthing Audrey, Wilcox burned and smashed Burke's head, killing him. He later practically confesses to Cassandra, but she decides not to tell Karl which interferes with their budding relationship. Karl already suspects Wilcox but hasn't enough evidence to arrest him and instead gives him an old box of his sister's from Burke's shed. Being terminally ill and not wanting to be buried in the same town as Burke, Wilcox leaves Gibsons, and right before his imminent death only some weeks later, he writes letters to both Karl and Cassandra trying to mend their relationship.
2	2	"Fall from Grace"	Leslie Hope	Sherry White	October 1, 2024
3	3	"A Chill Rain"	Leslie Hope	Ian Weir	October 8, 2024
4	4	"Prized Possessions"	Amanda Tapping	Jennifer Kennedy	October 15, 2024
5	5	"A Touch of Panic"	Amanda Tapping	Leonard Dick	October 22, 2024
6	6	"The Madness Method"	Milan Cheylov	Dennis Heaton & Sherry White	November 12, 2024
7	7	"Family Concerns"	Milan Cheylov	Ian Weir	November 19, 2024
8	8	"Sleep While I Sing"	Milan Cheylov	Ian Weir	November 26, 2024

=== Season 2 (2025) ===
No. overall	No. in season	Title	Directed by	Written by	Original release date
9	1	"Acts of Murder"	Amanda Tapping	Jennica Harper	September 23, 2025
10	2	"Blood Wedding"	Amanda Tapping	Ian Weir	September 30, 2025
11	3	"Mother Love"	David Frazee	Ian Weir	October 7, 2025
12	4	"One Last Song"	David Frazee	Derek Thompson	October 14, 2025
13	5	"Strangers Among Us"	Tracey Deer	Dennis Heaton	October 21, 2025
14	6	"Trust, But Verify"	Tracey Deer	Sherry White	November 4, 2025
15	7	"This, That, and the Other Thing"	Shannon Kohli	Leonard Dick	November 11, 2025
16	8	"Masterpiece"	Amanda Tapping	Dennis Heaton & Derek Thompson	November 18, 2025
17	9	"The Fall of Holman"	Amanda Tapping	Jennica Harper & Dennis Heaton	November 25, 2025
18	10	"Nightshade"	Shannon Kohli	Ian Weir & Leonard Dick	December 2, 2025

== Production ==
=== Development ===
Originated by Soapbox Productions and co-produced with Sepia Films in association with Future Shack Entertainment, the series was directed by Milan Cheylov and written by Ian Weir. Shooting locations included Molly's Reach, the Gibsons restaurant best known as a key setting in the Canadian comedy-drama series The Beachcombers. On January 16, 2025, Fox renewed the series for a second season. In May 2026, Fox renewed the series for a third season, which will premiere on February 1, 2027.

=== Distribution ===
In the United States, the series was picked up by Fox in late 2023, for the 2024–2025 television season. ITV Studios will distribute the series outside of the U.S. and Canada.

== Reception ==
On the review aggregator website Rotten Tomatoes, Murder in a Small Town has an approval rating of 70% based on 10 critic reviews, with an average rating of 5.3/10. Metacritic, which uses a weighted average, assigned a score of 56 out of 100 based on 7 critics, indicating "mixed or average" reviews.
