= Northwood (TV series) =

- Created by: Nick Orchard
- Starring: Lochlyn Munro; Maggie Blue O'Hara; Sarah Sawatsky; Byron Lucas; Brigitta Dau; Tygh Runyan; Deanna Milligan; Gabe Kouth; Sasha McLean; Doris Chillcott; Halona Donaghy; Mig Macario as Mike Andaluz; Lina Englund; Trevor Marc Hughes; Tamsin Jones Farmer
- Country of origin: Canada
- Original language: English
- No. of seasons: 4
- No. of episodes: 56

Production
- Producer: Nick Orchard
- Production locations: North Vancouver, British Columbia; West Vancouver, British Columbia
- Running time: 30 minutes

Original release
- Network: CBC Television
- Release: March 4, 1991 – January 15, 1994

Northwood is a Canadian teen drama television series created by Nick Orchard. It centres on the lives of teenagers living in the eponymous fictional North Vancouver suburb. It aired on CBC from March 4, 1991 to January 15, 1994.

Most initial reviews of the series were mixed, with criticism given to its excessive melodrama, lack of comic relief, and production values, though praise was given to the acting performances. Having replaced Degrassi High in its time slot, Northwood also drew multiple comparisons to the outgoing show. As it progressed, reviews became more positive.

A soundtrack album, Let It Be Me, was released in 1992. It is composed of adult contemporary covers by cast members of the show.

== Cast ==
- Lochlyn Munro as Jason Williams
- Brigitta Dau as Maria Giovanni
- Byron Lucas as Kirk Huber
- Trevor Hughes as Peter Anderson
- Tasmin Jones as Karin Anderson
- Darrell Dennis as Brian Potter
- Maggie Blue O'Hara as Nicole Williams
- Gabe Khouth as Michael Thomas
- Deanna Milligan as Jennifer McBride

== Reception ==
Those involved with the show, including creator Nick Orchard and actor Lochlyn Munro, stated it to be "grittier" and "meatier" than the outgoing Degrassi High, of which Northwood replaced in the 8:30pm Monday timeslot. Despite this, most early reviews of Northwood were mixed, with negative reviews drawing comparisons to Degrassi. Bob Remington of the Edmonton Journal rated it two stars and criticized what he felt to be the excessively melodramatic and humourless behavior of its characters, although he acknowledged the actors' competence. He also referred to Degrassi character Joey Jeremiah multiple times as an example of comic relief that he felt Northwood lacked. Janice Kennedy, writing for the Calgary Herald, was more lenient in her criticism, saying that while the show cut corners and fell into soap opera cliches unlike Degrassi, it boasted "solid acting" and "credible portrayal" from its actors, and stated that it had potential if it evolved beyond its trappings. Tony Atherton of the Ottawa Citizen, while also giving it a mixed review, rejected the Degrassi comparisons.

Mike Boone, writing for the Montreal Gazette, gave a more positive review, stating the show set itself apart from others because of its characters' "quintessential Canadian stoicism and unhipness", and praised the "strong cast of gifted young actors". Similarly, The StarPhoenix's Erica Smishek opined: "Strong performances by a well-rounded cast, effective location shooting and a grainy visual quality enhance the gritty appeal of Northwood. Now all its creators need is an audience for the six-episode test run.".

== Streaming ==
In 2019, the series was made available for free on Canada Media Fund's Encore+ YouTube channel. The channel shut down on November 30, 2022.
