= Silas White =

Canadian publisher and politician (born 1977)

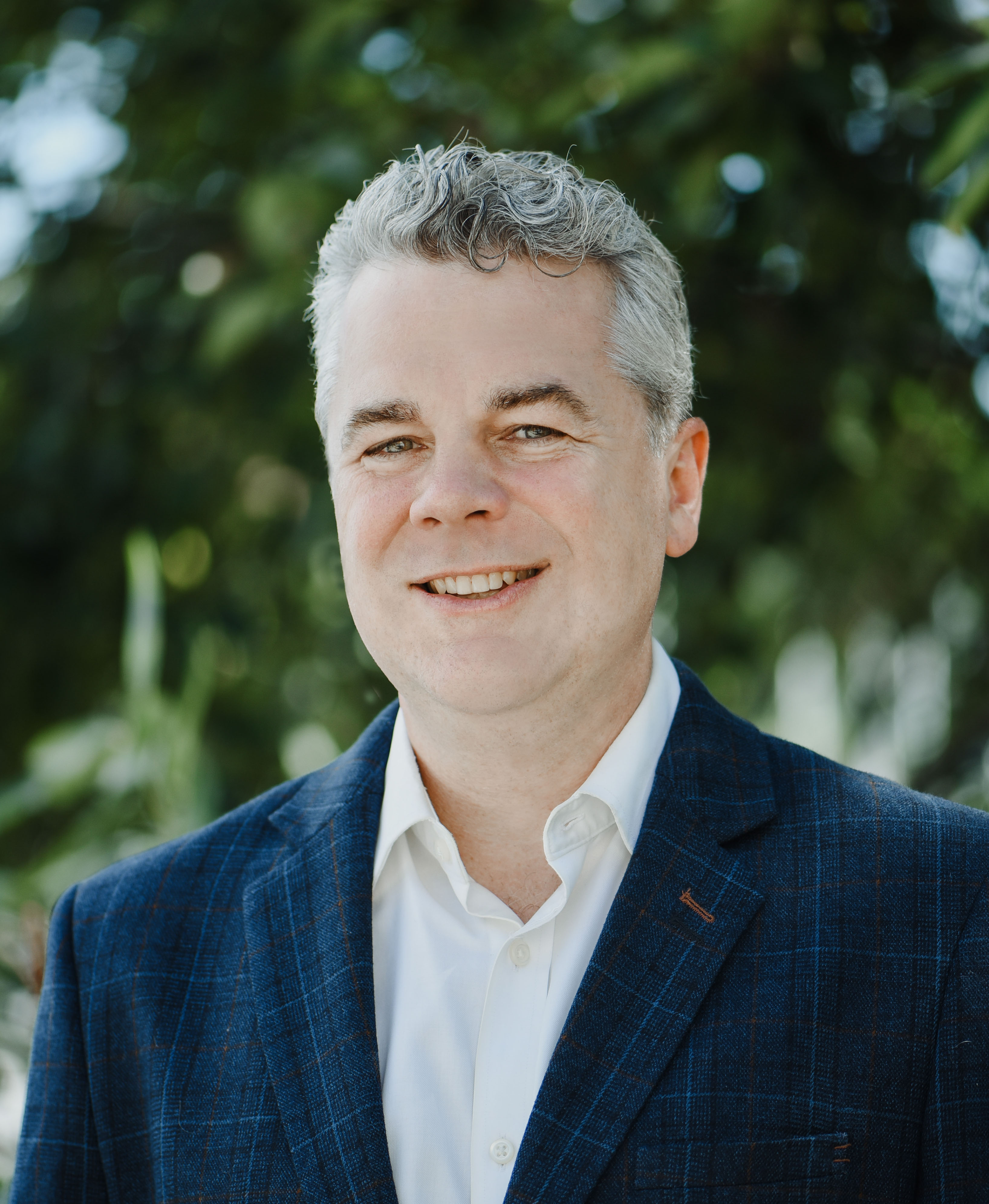
- White in 2022

Mayor for Gibsons
- Incumbent
- Assumed office November 1, 2022
- Preceded by: Bill Beamish

Director for Sunshine Coast Regional District
- Incumbent
- Assumed office November 10, 2022
- In office December 4, 2014 – January 1, 2017

Town Councillor for Gibsons
- In office December 2, 2014 – November 6, 2018

Personal details
- Born: Sechelt, British Columbia
- Spouse: Amanda Amaral (divorced)

Silas White is a Canadian publisher, author, and politician.

== Early life ==
White was born in Sechelt, British Columbia to Howard and Mary White, founders of book publisher Harbour Publishing, and grew up in Pender Harbour, British Columbia. He graduated with a degree in English literature from the University of British Columbia, and received a master's degree in public administration from the University of Victoria.

== Career ==
=== Publishing and Music ===
In 2000, White took over Nightwood Editions, a literary press owned by Harbour Publishing. Nightwood was originally established by Bill Bissett under the name "blewointment press", which was sold in 1983 due to financial difficulties. It has since published poetry and fiction by Canadian writers including Renée Sarojini Saklikar, Elizabeth Bachinsky, Tim Bowling, and Rita Wong.

White is also an editor and contributed to reference and literary publications including "The Encyclopedia of British Columbia." "The Fly in Autumn" by David Zieroth, one of many books he has edited, won the 2010 Governor General's Award for English-language poetry.

In August 2019 he released a retroactive album of Electric Fences recordings from 15 years prior, Retroact 2001-2004, with Vancouver indie label Kingfisher Bluez.

=== Elected office ===
In 2005, White was elected to the Board of Education at School District 46 Sunshine Coast. In 2007 he was selected by his colleagues as board chair, the youngest person to hold that post in British Columbia. He also served as a Director and vice-chair of the British Columbia Public School Employers' Association until Premier Christy Clark replaced the board with a public administrator to exercise direct control over teacher bargaining by the provincial government. In 2014 he left the board of School District 46 to run as councillor for the town of Gibsons, finishing first in the municipal election. As a councillor, he represented the town for two years at the Sunshine Coast Regional District.

Following a traffic accident that led to a careless driving ticket, he withdrew from the 2018 Gibsons election.

In the 2020 British Columbia general election, he managed the campaign of his former Gibsons council colleague Jeremy Valeriote for the Green Party of British Columbia in West Vancouver-Sea to Sky.

White ran for mayor of Gibsons in 2022, winning with 84.1% of the vote. White was re-elected to a second 4 year term as Mayor of Gibsons in 2026.

== Electoral record ==
=== 2026 Gibsons Mayoral election ===
Mayoral candidate	Votes	%
Silas White †	1,444	78.1%
Des Delaney	373	20.2%
Source: CivicInfo

=== 2022 Gibsons Mayoral election ===
Mayoral candidate	Votes	%
Silas White †	1,241	84.14
Leslie Thomson	196	13.29
Phil Yeung	38	2.58

=== 2014 Gibsons Town Council election ===
Top 4 candidates elected

Council candidate	Vote	%
Silas White	1,529	67.99
Jeremy Valeriote	1,325	58.92
Charlene SanJenko (X)	1,244	55.31
Stafford Lumley	1,117	49.67
LeeAnn Johnson (X)	925	41.13
Dan Bouman (X)	849	37.75
Barry Janyk	832	36.99
Katie Janyk	698	31.04
Turnout	2,249	62.47

== Bibliography ==
- 1993: Local Heroes: A History of the Western Hockey League (Harbour Publishing) ISBN 978-1-55017-080-1
- 1999: The Encyclopedia of British Columbia (Harbour Publishing) ISBN 978-1-55017-200-3
