= Deanna Milligan =

Canadian actress

Deanna Milligan (born March 10, 1972, in Vancouver, Canada) is a Canadian actress. She has appeared in numerous Canadian and American films and television shows.

== Career ==
Milligan had a major role playing Dave Thomas' daughter in The Beachcombers and related television films, including The New Beachcombers and A Beachcombers Christmas. She was the mystery woman in the Canadian independent short film Shoes Off!. She also costarred in the A&E TV movie Karroll's Christmas playing the girlfriend to Tom Everett Scott. Milligan also played the assistant to Santa Claus in the film Must Be Santa.

She was a regular on two short lived television shows: Northwood, where she played the troubled teen Jennifer, and Big Sound, where she played the bubbly assistant Jesse Polt to Greg Evigan. She has guest starred on shows such as The X-Files, Chris Carter's Millennium, Danger Bay, Neon Rider, 21 Jump Street, The Outer Limits, Sliders, Highlander: The Series, Da Vinci's Inquest, and Corner Gas.

== Filmography ==
=== Film ===
Year	Title	Role	Notes
1991	Crooked Hearts	Julie	
1993	This Boy's Life	Silver Sister #1	
1995	Once in a Blue Moon	Emily Piper	
1996	Starlight	Marilyn	
1997	Barbecue: A Love Story	Sas	
2000	Suspicious River	Millie	
2001	The Rhino Brothers	Allison Megan	
2001	Sea	Kay	
2001	Riding the Bus	Marcy	
2002	Blue Boy and Girl in Pink	Girl in Pink	
2003	Stealing Sinatra	Betty Amsler	
2006	Trapped Ashes	Annie	
2007	Love Notes	Maggie	
2022	Support Indie	—	Documentary

=== Television ===
Year	Title	Role	Notes
1986–1989	Danger Bay	Emma	8 episodes
1989	Bordertown	Anne Palliser	Episode: "Vigilante"
1990	Neon Rider	Beverly	Episode: "High Wire"
1990, 1991	21 Jump Street	Vicki West / Vanessa	2 episodes
1991–1994	Northwood	Jennifer	53 episodes
1993	Cobra	Kim Ashton	Episode: "Hostage Hearts"
1994	My Name Is Kate	Carrie	Television film
1994	Highlander: The Series	Laura Daniels	Episode: "Under Colour of Authority"
1994	For the Love of Nancy	Debbie	Television film
1994	Avalanche	Deidre Kemp	Television film
1994	Lonesome Dove: The Series	Emily	Episode: "Ballad of a Gunfighter"
1995	Deadly Nightshade	Tracy Simmons	Television film
1995	The X-Files	Satin	Episode: "Irresistible"
1996	Sliders	Gillian Mitchell	Episode: "Gillian of the Spirits"
1996	Angel Flight Down	Angie Brown	Television film
1996	Two	Amy	Episode: "Victoria's Secret"
1996, 1998	Millennium	Carol Wheatley / Tina	2 episodes
1997	Dead Man's Gun	Little Iris	Television film
1997	Intensity	Laura Templeton	Television film
1997	Dead Man's Gun	Little Iris	Episode: "My Brother's Keeper"
1997	The Accident: A Moment of Truth Movie	Kate Jenkins	Television film
1997	The Advocate's Devil	Zoe	Television film
1998	I Know What You Did	Cynthia Morgan	Television film
1998	The Net	Rain	Episode: "Pandora's Box"
1999	Night Man	Lorrie Jarvis / Night Woman	Episode: "Nightwoman Returns"
1999	Justice	Sarah McLennan	Television film
1999	Must Be Santa	Natalie Fairlie	Television film
1999, 2004	Cold Squad	Lila Nelson / Shelly Johnson	2 episodes
2000	The Outer Limits	Gail	Episode; "Skin Deep"
2000, 2001	Big Sound	Jessie	2 episodes
2001	Special Unit 2	Arianna Wilkerson	Episode: "The Wall"
2001–2002	Da Vinci's Inquest	Constable Josie Hutchens	4 episodes
2002	The Chris Isaak Show	Charlotte	Episode: "Wrong Number"
2002	American Dreams	Pregnant Woman	Episode: "Pilot"
2002	The New Beachcombers	Donna McGonigal	Television film
2003	Out of Order	Purity	6 episodes
2004	Family Sins	Marie	Television film
2004	Touching Evil	Melinda 'Lynn' Noll	Episode: "Y Me"
2004	NTSB: The Crash of Flight 323	Miriam	Television film
2004	The Collector	Taren	Episode: "The Yogi"
2004	A Beachcombers Christmas	Donna McGonigal	Television film
2004	Karroll's Christmas	Carrie Ford	Television film
2005	Corner Gas	Heather	Episode: "Harvest Dance"
2007	Intelligence	Martha Kopps	Episode: "A Man and a Woman Betrayed"
2008	The Secrets of Pine Cove	Patti McMullen	Television film
2008	Men in Trees	Pointy Shoes	Episode: "Kiss and Don't Tell"
2009	Knights of Bloodsteel	Maya	2 episodes
2010	Seven Deadly Sins	Ashley Grace	2 episodes
