= Gibsons =

- Town
- Town of Gibsons
- Gibsons Marina

- Flag

- Location of Gibsons in British Columbia
- Coordinates: 49°24′4″N 123°30′27″W
- Country: Canada
- Province: British Columbia
- Region: Sunshine Coast
- Regional district: Sunshine Coast
- Founded: 1886
- Incorporated: 1929

Government
  - Governing body: Gibsons Town Council David Croal, Annemarie De Andrade, Christi Thompson, Stafford Lumley
  - Mayor: Silas White

Area
  - Total: 4.32 km^{2} (1.67 sq mi)
- Elevation: 10 m (33 ft)

Population (2021)
  - Total: 4,758
  - Density: 1,100/km^{2} (2,850/sq mi)
- Time zone: UTC−07:00 (PT)
- Postal code: V0N 1V0 & V0N 3V0
- Area codes: 604, 778
- Gibsons Way / Highway 101: 101
- Waterways: Howe Sound
- Website: www.gibsons.ca

Gibsons is a town on the Sunshine Coast in southwestern British Columbia, Canada, on the northwest shore of Howe Sound. Located within the Pacific coastal rainforest and serving as the gateway to the rest of the Sunshine Coast, Gibsons is a regional tourist destination.

Established in 1886 by George Gibson, the settlement was incorporated in 1929 as Gibson's Landing and renamed Gibsons in 1947. Historically a centre for forestry and commercial fishing, the town has since developed a more diversified economy. In 2009, it received the International Award for Liveable Communities for "the world's most liveable community with a population under 20,000". It is best known as the setting of the long-running CBC Television series The Beachcombers and has served as a filming location for productions including Murder in a Small Town, Charlie St. Cloud, and Needful Things.

Gibsons has increasingly become a bedroom community for workers in Greater Vancouver. Like the rest of the Sunshine Coast, Gibsons has no direct road connection to the British Columbia mainland and is primarily accessible by BC Ferries service between Horseshoe Bay in West Vancouver and Langdale.

== History ==
The land currently known as Gibsons is part of the traditional and ancestral lands of the Sḵwx̱wú7mesh Úxwumixw, which also includes parts of Greater Vancouver and the Squamish River watershed. Sḵwx̱wú7mesh oral history tells that the region around Gibsons was the birthplace of the Squamish people after what is called The Great Flood.

The European settlement town of Gibsons was established in 1886 by George Gibson and his sons. It was incorporated in 1929 as Gibson's Landing, and in 1947 was renamed Gibsons at the residents' request. The town's two main sections are:

- Lower Gibsons, the mostly residential seaside area that includes Gibsons Marina, Molly's Reach, and Winegarden Park, with an auditorium that hosts live performances in the summer. It also has shops and restaurants catering mostly to vacationers.
- Upper Gibsons, along the Sunshine Coast Highway (BC Highway 101), with commercial areas including Sunnycrest Mall, the town's two major supermarkets, a variety of fast food restaurants, the largest elementary school, and the high school.

Gibsons is the first town in British Columbia to accept styrofoam at its recycling facility, the Gibsons Recycling Depot. Its staff has travelled widely to promote styrofoam recycling; founder Buddy Boyd was invited to address an international Zero Waste conference in Florianopolis, Brazil.

== Economy ==
The Sunshine Coast has seen a three-decade transition from a forestry- and fishing-based economy to a more diverse one with construction trades, business services, retail and tourism becoming prominent.

Between 2016 and 2021, its population grew 3.3% compared with BC's overall growth rate of 7.6%. In 2021, the median resident age was 56.0 years, compared with the provincial median of 42.8 years.

== Climate ==
Gibsons is in a temperate coastal climate, with mild, rainy winters and warm, dry summers. The region's landscape is in a temperate rainforest.

Climate data for Gibsons
Month	Jan	Feb	Mar	Apr	May	Jun	Jul	Aug	Sep	Oct	Nov	Dec	Year
Record high °C (°F)	13.5 (56.3)	16.7 (62.1)	18.9 (66.0)	25 (77)	30.6 (87.1)	32 (90)	36 (97)	32.8 (91.0)	32 (90)	24 (75)	17.8 (64.0)	14.5 (58.1)	36 (97)
Mean daily maximum °C (°F)	6.5 (43.7)	7.9 (46.2)	10.3 (50.5)	13.4 (56.1)	16.9 (62.4)	19.7 (67.5)	22.2 (72.0)	22.6 (72.7)	19.1 (66.4)	13.5 (56.3)	8.6 (47.5)	6.1 (43.0)	13.9 (57.0)
Daily mean °C (°F)	4.4 (39.9)	5.2 (41.4)	7.2 (45.0)	9.8 (49.6)	13 (55)	15.7 (60.3)	18 (64)	18.2 (64.8)	15.1 (59.2)	10.6 (51.1)	6.4 (43.5)	4 (39)	10.6 (51.1)
Mean daily minimum °C (°F)	2.2 (36.0)	2.5 (36.5)	4.1 (39.4)	6.1 (43.0)	9 (48)	11.7 (53.1)	13.6 (56.5)	13.7 (56.7)	11.1 (52.0)	7.7 (45.9)	4.1 (39.4)	1.9 (35.4)	7.3 (45.1)
Record low °C (°F)	−15.6 (3.9)	−12 (10)	−8.3 (17.1)	−3.3 (26.1)	−2.2 (28.0)	3.9 (39.0)	5.5 (41.9)	5.6 (42.1)	0 (32)	−3 (27)	−12.2 (10.0)	−17.8 (0.0)	−17.8 (0.0)
Average precipitation mm (inches)	183.4 (7.22)	109.8 (4.32)	125.4 (4.94)	104.3 (4.11)	91.3 (3.59)	66.8 (2.63)	41.1 (1.62)	48.8 (1.92)	60.5 (2.38)	152.3 (6.00)	212.9 (8.38)	174.3 (6.86)	1,370.8 (53.97)
Average rainfall mm (inches)	174.4 (6.87)	103.6 (4.08)	122.2 (4.81)	104.2 (4.10)	91.3 (3.59)	66.8 (2.63)	41.1 (1.62)	48.8 (1.92)	60.5 (2.38)	152 (6.0)	211 (8.3)	166.6 (6.56)	1,342.4 (52.85)
Average snowfall cm (inches)	9.1 (3.6)	6.2 (2.4)	3.2 (1.3)	0.1 (0.0)	0 (0)	0 (0)	0 (0)	0 (0)	0 (0)	0.3 (0.1)	1.9 (0.7)	7.7 (3.0)	28.4 (11.2)

== Demographics ==
In the 2021 Census of Population conducted by Statistics Canada, Gibsons had a population of 4,758 living in 2,282 of its 2,482 total private dwellings, a change of 3.3% from its 2016 population of 4,605. With a land area of 4.31 km^{2} (1.66 sq mi), it had a population density of 1,103.9/km^{2} (2,859.2/sq mi) in 2021.

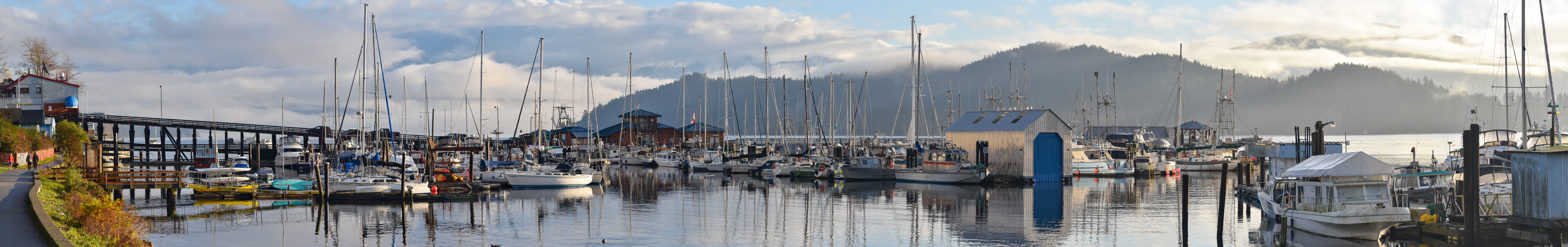
Gibsons Harbour, Sunshine Coast

=== Ethnicity ===
Panethnic groups in the Town of Gibsons (2001−2021)
Panethnic group	2021		2016		2011		2006		2001	
Panethnic group	Pop.	%	Pop.	%	Pop.	%	Pop.	%	Pop.	%
European (Note: Statistic includes all persons that did not make up part of a visible minority or an indigenous identity.)	3,800	83.06%	3,825	86.83%	3,730	88.28%	3,705	91.26%	3,545	92.56%
Indigenous	265	5.79%	205	4.65%	200	4.73%	220	5.42%	120	3.13%
East Asian (Note: Statistic includes total responses of "Chinese", "Korean", and "Japanese" under visible minority section on census.)	175	3.83%	115	2.61%	80	1.89%	40	0.99%	125	3.26%
Southeast Asian (Note: Statistic includes total responses of "Filipino" and "Southeast Asian" under visible minority section on census.)	130	2.84%	125	2.84%	120	2.84%	10	0.25%	20	0.52%
South Asian	105	2.3%	30	0.68%	15	0.36%	0	0%	0	0%
African	50	1.09%	70	1.59%	45	1.07%	20	0.49%	15	0.39%
Latin American	20	0.44%	10	0.23%	0	0%	10	0.25%	10	0.26%
Middle Eastern (Note: Statistic includes total responses of "West Asian" and "Arab" under visible minority section on census.)	0	0%	0	0%	0	0%	10	0.25%	0	0%
Other/multiracial (Note: Statistic includes total responses of "Visible minority, n.i.e." and "Multiple visible minorities" under visible minority section on census.)	25	0.55%	15	0.34%	0	0%	30	0.74%	0	0%
Total responses	4,575	96.15%	4,405	95.66%	4,225	95.22%	4,060	97.08%	3,830	98.05%
Total population	4,758	100%	4,605	100%	4,437	100%	4,182	100%	3,906	100%
Note: Totals greater than 100% due to multiple origin responses.

=== Religion ===
According to the 2021 census, religious groups in Gibsons included:

- Irreligion (2,810 persons or 61.4%)
- Christianity (1,515 persons or 33.1%)
- Buddhism (75 persons or 1.6%)
- Judaism (30 persons or 0.7%)
- Sikhism (30 persons or 0.7%)
- Hinduism (25 persons or 0.5%)
- Islam (25 persons or 0.5%)
- Other (75 persons or 1.6%)

== Notable people ==
- Ryan Dempster – major league baseball pitcher
- Bruno Gerussi – actor, The Beachcombers
- Peter Trower – poet and novelist
- Ken Bell – Canadian photographer during WWII
- Lyn Vernon – mezzo-soprano (later dramatic soprano), conductor, teacher
- Paul George – environmentalist
- Adriane Carr – environmentalist and politician
- Todd Bentley – evangelist
- J.S. Woodsworth – politician, founder of the Canadian Commonwealth Foundation (predecessor to the New Democratic Party)
- Grace MacInnis – politician and feminist
- Paul Rudolph – cyclist and former guitarist & vocalist with the Pink Fairies
- Don S. Davis – actor known for his roles as General George S. Hammond on Stargate SG-1 and Major Garland Briggs on Twin Peaks.
- Devin Townsend – musician and frontman for Strapping Young Lad, Devin Townsend Project, and Devin Townsend Band.
- Celso Machado – Brazilian guitarist and multi-instrumentalist
- Garth "GGGarth" Richardson – music producer and recording engineer
- Aristazabal Hawkes – bassist for the English indie rock band, a Mercury Music Prize, BRIT Awards and NME Awards nominee Guillemots (band)
- Silas White – publisher, musician and politician
- Skye Wallace – singer-songwriter
- Warne Livesey – music producer and recording engineer for Midnight Oil and Matthew Good
- Joey Cramer – actor
- Velcrow Ripper – filmmaker
- Rhys Fulber – musician and producer
- John Fluevog – shoe designer and businessperson

== Awards ==
In February 2005, Gibsons won the Berkeley Springs International Water Tasting contest, coming first in the world.

In October 2009, the town was declared the "Most Liveable Community in the World" (under 20,000 population) at the international Livcom Awards. Endorsed by the United Nations Environment Programme, the LivCom competition focuses on best practices for local environmental management.

In 2009 Gibsons won an Energy & Climate Action Award for Community Planning and Development from the Community Energy Association. A major factor in the award was a new housing development, which will be heated by Canada's first publicly owned geoexchange system. In 2013, the Town of Gibsons was recognized by the Community Energy Association for its Natural Asset Management as a Climate Adaptation Approach.

Other awards include:

- 1st Place among all world cities in LivCom's "Planning for the Future" category in 2009.
- Communities in Bloom awards – 2008 Provincial Champions; 2007 Provincial Champions award for Environmental Awareness; 2006 Provincial Champions for best floral displays.
- OCP award, SmartGrowth BC, 2007
