= He Sees You When You're Sleeping =

- DVD Cover
- Directed by: David Winning
- Written by: Carl Binder, based on a Mary Higgins Clark's story
- Produced by: Leanne Arnott; Stephen Arnott
- Starring: Cameron Bancroft; Erika Eleniak; Nickol Tschenscher; Eli Gabay; Pam Hyatt
- Cinematography: David Pelletier
- Edited by: Jana Fritsch
- Music by: Michael Richard Plowman
- Production companies: Edge Entertainment; Rigel Entertainment; Waterfront Pictures
- Distributed by: PAX Television (USA) (Original Airing); Ardustry Home Entertainment
- Release date: December 22, 2002; (USA)
- Running time: 100 minutes
- Country: Canada
- Language: English

He Sees You When You're Sleeping is a 2002 Canadian made-for-TV Christmas drama film, starring Cameron Bancroft and Erika Eleniak. It was written by Carl Binder, based on a story by Mary Higgins Clark and directed by David Winning. The film was first aired at PAX Television on December 22, 2002.

== Plot ==
Sterling Brooks (Cameron Bancroft) is a selfish stock-broker, who happens to die in a freak accident. Now, to get an eternal place in heaven he has to reunite a family.

== Cast ==
- Cameron Bancroft as Sterling Brooks
- Erika Eleniak as Annie Campbell
- Nickol Tschenscher as Marissa Campbell
- Eli Gabay as Junior Badgett
- Pam Hyatt as Nor Campbell
- Craig March as Eddie Badgett
- Udo Kier as Hans Kramer
- Greg Evigan as Joe

== Reception ==
Andy Webb from "The Movie Scene" gave it two out of five stars and stated: "What this all boils down to is that "He Sees You When You're Sleeping" is entertaining in a sort of its so corny it is amusing kind of way. But for me it was certainly not what I expected from a movie which is part of "The Mary Higgins Clark Collection" and the mix of humour and drama in this doesn't really work."

He Sees You When You're Sleeping won four awards. Two in the Chicago International Film Festival, for "Best Feature Length Telefilm: Drama" and "Special Achievement in Direction" for David Winning. One Columbus International Film & Video Festival for "Entertainment". And one "WorldFest Houston" for "Television and Cable Production - Feature Made for Television/Cable".
