= Celebrity Cooks =

Canadian cooking show

- Genre: Cooking show
- Created by: Derek Smith and Kent Anthony
- Developed by: Derek Smith and Keith Large
- Written by: Gary Dunford
- Starring: Bruno Gerussi
- Country of origin: Canada
- Original language: English
- No. of seasons: 12
- No. of episodes: 478

Production
- Executive producers: Derek Smith and Keith Large
- Production locations: Vancouver, Ottawa, Toronto
- Production companies: Carleton Productions, Initiative Productions

Original release
- Network: CBC Television
- Release: 1975 – 1979
- Network: Global
- Release: 1980 – 1987

Celebrity Cooks is a Canadian cooking show independently produced by Carleton Productions and Insight Productions that aired on CBC Television from 1975 to 1979 and on Global from 1980 to 1987. It was syndicated throughout Canada and the United States from 1980 to 1987. In the early 1990s, it continued in syndication in Canada. Barrie, Ontario-based CKVR later ran episodes in the 1990s that were also available in Toronto and surrounding areas for at least one season.

Bruno Gerussi hosted 478 episodes in total. He introduced celebrities, saw guests perform and chatted with them while preparing dishes for the audience.

== History ==
Celebrity Cooks began a successful run with CBC Television in 1975. Hermione Gingold was the guest for the program's first broadcast, on 15 September 1975. Bruno Gerussi served as host throughout the series.

The show moved to Global in 1980. In addition to the daytime programming, Global also developed 26 prime-time episodes. The show continued to air in Canada with Global and on a few CBS owned-and-operated stations in the United States until 1987. At that point, Initiative Productions and partners had produced 478 episodes.

Among the guests who appeared on the show was a pre-stardom David Letterman. Other guests included Margaret Trudeau (aired 3 February 1978), Jean Beliveau, Barry Morse and Elayne Boosler.

An episode featuring guest Bob Crane was recorded on 28 January 1978. Crane was murdered on 29 June, making this his last TV appearance. The episode was scheduled to air on WCBS-TV in July 1978; however, given the circumstances, it did not air at all in the United States. The episode did air five times in Canada, beginning in February 1978. WCBS's Jeff Erdell claimed that Crane was distraught and joked about sex and death during the show, claims repeated in Robert Graysmith's book The Murder of Bob Crane and dramatized in the film Auto Focus, but this has been denied by the show's producers and production staff.

In 2012, Derek Smith, the creator of Celebrity Cooks, tried to bring back the show in a new version as The New Celebrity Cooks with a new host, actress and improv comic and actress Ellie Harvie in much the same format as the original show. The show was to be produced by Smith's Upside Right Media Inc.

The show also led to the creation of Celebrity Cooks cookbooks:

- 1977: Celebrity Cooks, Recipe Book II (Fforbez Enterprises/Initiative Productions) ISBN 0-08-897602-5, ISBN 0-08-897602-1
- 1979: The New Celebrity Cooks Cookbook (Methuen) ISBN 0-458-94280-4

== Key people ==
- Creator: Derek Smith
- Developed by: Derek Smith and Keith Large
- Executive Producers: Keith Large and Derek Smith
- Host: Bruno Gerussi
- Musical Duo:Jim Walchuck and Henri Lorieau
- Cooking Consultants: Helga Theilmann and Joan Mitchell (Season 1 & 2, Ottawa), Sue Morton & Chuck Norris (Seasons 3 to 12, Vancouver and Toronto)
- Talent coordinator: Anne Kear
- Executive Assistant to Derek Smith: Sharyn Manuel
- Series writer: Gary Dunford
