= Friday Island (TV series) =

Canadian comedy-drama television series

- Genre: Comedy drama
- Written by: Christine Best; Peter Power; Peter Statner
- Country of origin: Canada
- Original language: English
- No. of seasons: 1

Production
- Producer: John Thorn
- Production location: Vancouver
- Running time: 30 minutes

Original release
- Network: CBC Television
- Release: 19 October 1962 – 12 April 1963

Friday Island is a Canadian comedy-drama television series which aired on CBC Television from 1962 to 1963.

== Premise ==
This Vancouver-produced series was set on the fictional Friday Island in British Columbia where the Granger family has moved from Ottawa to establish a tourist lodge. The Granger parents (Lillian Carlson, Walter Marsh) and their sons Stephen (Mark de Courcey) and Tadpole (Kevin Burchett) were joined by Grandpa (James Onley), Aunt Sophie (Rae Brown) and Aunt Vi (Mildred Franklin). The Grangers were joined by other residents such as young Boomer (Reagh Cooper). Archie (Robert Clothier) and Barbara Tremain (Niki Lipman) jointly owned the community's general store, but a picket fence divided the store with Barbara operating the post office side while Archie minded the store portion.

== Scheduling ==
This half-hour series was broadcast Fridays at 5:30 p.m. from 19 October 1962 to 12 April 1963.
