= Jackson Davies =

Canadian actor (born 1950)

- Born: 17 March 1950 (age 76); Wetaskiwin, Alberta, Canada
- Occupation: Actor
- Known for: The Beachcombers

Jackson Davies (born 17 March 1950) is a Canadian actor. He is best known for his role as RCMP Constable John Constable in the television series The Beachcombers, which he reprised in the TV movies The New Beachcombers (2002) and A Beachcombers Christmas (2004).

== Career ==
Originally from Wetaskiwin, Alberta and now living in Vancouver, British Columbia, he has acted in over 160 stage shows in most of the major theatres in Canada. He has appeared in over 300 TV shows and been in 30 TV movies and feature films.

Jackson is the vice president of the Union of BC Performers / ACTRA, the past vice chair of the BC Arts Council and a faculty member in both the Performing Arts and Motion Picture Arts programs at Capilano University. He is an Honorary Sergeant of the RCMP, a rarely bestowed designation.

Davies, and Marc Strange, one of the original producers of The Beachcombers, published Bruno and the Beach: The Beachcombers at 40 in 2013. The book is a history of the show and a profile of key members of the cast and crew.

== Filmography ==
=== Film ===
Year	Title	Role	Notes
1979	A Man, a Woman, and a Bank	Elevator Guard #2	
1983	Entrapment	Inspector Fred Foster	
1984	Runaway	Inspector	
1986	High Stakes	Billings	
1987	The Stepfather	Mr. Chesterton	
1987	Stakeout	FBI Agent Lusk	
1987	Home Is Where the Hart Is	Minister at Funeral	
1990	Bird on a Wire	Paul Bernard	
1991	Bingo	Vet	
1995	Trust in Me	Ted	
2001	Saving Silverman	Wedding guest	Uncredited
2001	Freddy Got Fingered	Mr. Malloy	
2004	The Wild Guys	Stewart	

=== Television ===
Year	Title	Role	Notes
1975–2002	The Beachcombers	John Constable	117 episodes
1977	The Red Dress	Howard	Television film
1980	The Plutonium Incident	Walker	Television film
1983	Jane Doe	Policeman	Television film
1983	The Best Christmas Pageant Ever	Bob Bradley	Television film
1983	The Hitchhiker	Jake McElhaney	Episode: "Split Decision"
1984	Secrets of a Married Man	Terry	Television film
1985	Love, Mary	Mr. Yates	Television film
1985	Picking Up the Pieces	Dr. Simmons	Television film
1985	Love Is Never Silent	Mr. Woods	Television film
1985	Constable Constable	Constable John Constable	Television film
1986	Nobody's Child	Bob Stavros	Television film
1987	Deadly Deception	Officer Poole	Television film
1987	Hands of a Stranger	Captain Lauder	Television film
1987	Wiseguy	Philly Weinstein	Episode: "Last Rites for Lucci"
1987	Trying Times	Charlie	Episode: "Moving Day"
1987–1989	21 Jump Street	Principal / Bowler / Nathan Young	3 episodes
1988	Brookside	Professor Benwall Deburau	
1988–1990	MacGyver	Mike Kiley	5 episodes
1989	Unsub	Litton	Episode: "Silent Stalker"
1989	Bordertown	J. J. Nelson	Episode: "The Reaper"
1989	C.B.C.'s Magic Hour	Brad Tyler	Episode: "High Country"
1991	I Still Dream of Jeannie	Dave	Television film
1992	Diagnosis Murder: Diagnosis of Murder	T.V. A.D.	Television film
1992	Bill & Ted's Excellent Adventures	Principal	Episode: "Deja Vu"
1992	Screen One	Captain Hazelwood	Episode: "Disaster at Valdez"
1992	The Hat Squad	O'Bannon	Episode: "Phoenix Rising"
1992	Street Justice	Smith	4 episodes
1992	Dead Ahead: The Exxon Valdez Disaster	Captain Hazelwood	Television film
1994	The X-Files	Agent Bruskin	Episode: "Lazarus"
1994	The Man Who Wouldn't Die	Lt. Powers	Television film
2001	Hit the Spot with Jackson Davies	Host	Television film
2004	A Beachcombers Christmas	Staff Sgt. John Constable	Television film
