= The Bears and I =

1974 film directed by Bernard McEveety

- Theatrical release poster
- Directed by: Bernard McEveety
- Screenplay by: John Whedon
- Based on: The Bears and I by Robert Franklin Leslie
- Produced by: Winston Hibler
- Starring: Patrick Wayne; Chief Dan George; Andrew Duggan; Michael Ansara; Robert Pine
- Narrated by: Jack Speirs
- Cinematography: Ted D. Landon
- Edited by: G. Gregg McLaughlin
- Music by: Buddy Baker
- Production company: Walt Disney Productions
- Distributed by: Buena Vista Distribution
- Release date: July 31, 1974
- Running time: 89 minutes
- Country: United States
- Language: English
- Box office: $4 million (rentals) (US/Canada)

The Bears and I is a 1974 American drama film directed by Bernard McEveety and written by John Whedon. The film stars Patrick Wayne, Chief Dan George, Andrew Duggan, Michael Ansara and Robert Pine. The film was released on July 31, 1974, by Buena Vista Distribution.

== Plot ==
Robert (Bob) Leslie, a Vietnam veteran goes to the remote homeland of a fallen comrade to deliver his personal effects to his father, a First Nations chief and shaman. He is taken with the beauty of the west and decides to stay awhile to find himself.

Bob finds three orphaned cubs and begins to raise them, with the intent of teaching them to be independent. However, in the process he grows attached to them, causing him to waver in his determination to release them back into the wild.

Meanwhile, the indigenous population faces eviction by the federal government, which wants to build facilities in the part of the national park where they reside. Bob tries several times to speak to the park board on their behalf, but his ignorance of Native history leads to conflict between him and his friend's people. Some register evident frustration, while others resist the authorities' intent with threats of violence. As the tension escalates, one man turns his anger towards Bob and attacks his home and the bears, leading to a forest fire that endangers the park and its inhabitants, human and animal.

As he comes to understand the wisdom of his friend's father and the danger the bears face, Bob realizes he must push the bears away.

== Cast ==
- Patrick Wayne as Bob Leslie / Narrator
- Chief Dan George as Chief Peter A-Tas-Ka-Nay
- Andrew Duggan as Commissioner Gaines
- Michael Ansara as Oliver Red Fern
- Robert Pine as John McCarten
- Valentin de Vargas as Sam Eagle Speaker
- Hal Baylor as Foreman

== Music ==
The film's score was written by Buddy Baker. The film features one original song, "Sweet Surrender", written and performed by John Denver. The song plays during the film's opening credits, as well as during an interlude as Bob begins to bond with the three bear cubs.

== See also ==
- List of American films of 1974
