= Molly's Reach =

Former fictional restaurant in The Beachcombers

Coordinates: 49°24′06″N 123°30′20″W

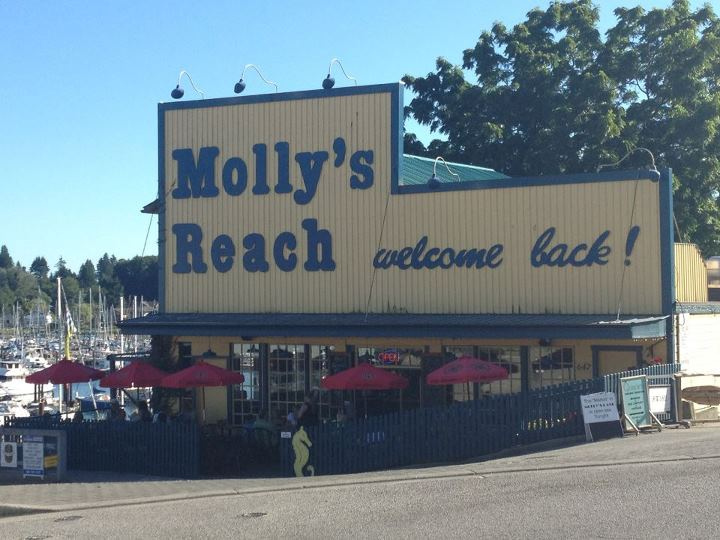
Molly's Reach in 2012

Molly's Reach was a fictional restaurant in the real community of Gibson's Landing, British Columbia, during the nineteen years the Canadian television series The Beachcombers was set there. The series ended in 1990, and the building is now a real restaurant.

The show's fictional restaurant was named after the character who owned it, Molly Carmody (portrayed by Rae Brown), who served as a mother-figure for other characters. A reach is a geographical term for a section of a river. As the town cafe and natural meeting point, where Nick also rented a room as office space for his salvage company, much of the drama happened in and immediately around Molly's Reach.

The original structure was built in 1926, and served a variety of purposes, including a second hand store, a general store, a hardware store and a liquor store, prior to serving as a set for the television show. After the show ended it was turned into an actual restaurant.

The Beachcombers was the Canadian Broadcasting Corporation's longest running series, one which was re-sold in fifty foreign markets, and fans of the show, both foreign and domestic, seek out the restaurant. The restaurant's walls bear many photos featuring the show's cast and crew. In 2016 the Vancouver Sun called the restaurant Gibsons' "most prominent landmark". It is located in the middle of town on the main highway, just up the street from the government dock.

A made-for-TV movie, The New Beachcombers, to mark the thirtieth anniversary of the original series first episode, revolved around a fictional fight to prevent the restaurant being torn down and replaced by condominiums.

The building was put up for sale on September 22, 2019.

The building was reused for location shooting in the 2024 crime drama series Murder in a Small Town, with producer Nick Orchard commenting that "The fun thing is that we are calling it Molly’s Reach. We’re not pretending it’s anything else but Molly’s Reach."
