= Karroll's Christmas =

2004 television film

- Based on: A Christmas Carol by Charles Dickens
- Screenplay by: David Schneider; Drew Daywalt
- Directed by: Dennis Dugan
- Starring: Tom Everett Scott; Wallace Shawn; Verne Troyer; Alanna Ubach; Deanna Milligan; Richard Kline; Larry Miller
- Music by: John Frizzell
- Country of origin: United States
- Original language: English

Production
- Executive producer: Linda Berman; John Cosgrove; Delia Fine; Terry Dunn-Meurer; George Paige; Jon Klane
- Producer: Avi Levy
- Cinematography: Andres Garreton; Jon Joffin
- Editor: Patrick J. Don Vito
- Running time: 87 minutes
- Production company: Cosgrove-Meurer Productions; Voice Pictures

Original release
- Network: A&E
- Release: December 14, 2004

Karroll's Christmas is a 2004 American made-for-television Christmas comedy film directed by Dennis Dugan. It is based on the 1843 novella A Christmas Carol by Charles Dickens. It aired on A&E on December 14, 2004.

== Plot ==
Allen Karroll is cynical writer who hates Christmas yet works at a greeting card company. He also has an ongoing rivalry with his neighbor Zeb Rosecog, a grumpy and antisocial man who was the former CEO of Karroll's company. On Christmas Eve Karroll has a run in with Rosecog that results in him getting thrown off a bus and colliding with a child. Upset when the child calls him "grumpy", Karroll deliberately refuses to help the boy when he's accused of throwing a snowball at Santa. Karroll's bad day continues with a terrible presentation to his company's only main client that threatens his job and alienates his girlfriend, in the process ruining her secret plans to propose to him that night. After his girlfriend leaves Karroll is visited by the ghost of Jacob Marley (related to Bob Marley), who mistakes him for Rosecog because he had the wrong address and tells him that he will be visited by the ghosts of Christmas Present, Past, and Future.

The first ghost, Christmas Present, refuses to acknowledge that she has the wrong person and via a magical remote control capable of transporting them through space and time, shows him the impact that Rosecog has had on the people around him. He sees that Rosecog is trying to sue a family for improperly shoveled sidewalks, noting that the little boy from earlier that day is also part of the family and that he was harshly punished because Karroll didn't vouch for him. Curious about the remote Karroll tries to examine it, which results in him and the ghosts traveling to a past Christmas when he met Carrie, causing the realization that not all Christmases are bad. They also travel to the next day, where Rosecog's daughter talks about how he is a miserable person.

The next ghost, Christmas Past, recognizes that Karroll is not Rosecog but persuades him to go on the journey anyway. They travel back in time, where it's shown that Rosecog was an idealistic family man until he became too obsessed with his job. This results in his estrangement from his daughter after he is unable to come to the hospital to visit his dying wife in time. They then see a now jaded Rosecog announce that he is selling the company, as he has lost both of the people he loved most in the world. The two also travel to Karroll's past, where they see him publicly propose to his then girlfriend Lisa while wearing a caribou costume. She rejects him and also informs him that she was cheating on him. The final ghost, Christmas Future, is also aware that Karroll is the wrong person but is equally willing to continue on with the façade. The two watch as Rosecog dies alone in a hospital room while all of his belongings are sold or thrown away. The man dies alone, mistakenly believing that his daughter wanted nothing to do with him, when in reality she was unable to come to his side in time. Karroll also learns that he has lost his job and that Carrie had broken up with him.

Karroll wakes with new purpose on Christmas Day and decides to win over Rosecog. He unsuccessfully tries to use the remote to accomplish this, breaking it in the process. He instead manages to break through to Rosecog by humming the Christmas song that was playing near his wife's deathbed. The two men reconcile and are able to bring Rosecog and his daughter back together. Rosecog also drops the lawsuit and Karroll testifies to the child's innocence. With the help of the three ghosts, Karroll is able to steal a reindeer suit and sneak into his girlfriend's concert and propose. She agrees, in turn confessing that she was going to propose to him. Karroll is also able to save his job by using a popup card design that Rosecog had created.

== Characters ==
- Tom Everett Scott as Allen Karroll
- Wallace Shawn as Zeb Rosecog
- Larry Miller as Barry Freedman (Ghost of Christmas Past)
- Alanna Ubach as Jodie McDougall (Ghost of Christmas Present)
- Verne Troyer as "Spike" Goldstein (Ghost of Christmas Future)
- Deanna Milligan as Carrie Ford
- Richard Kline as Bradley Carchet

== Production ==
Filming for Karroll's Christmas took place in Calgary during the fall of 2004.

== Reception ==
Critical reception was mixed. Walt Belcher of The Tampa Tribune panned the film, writing that "the laughs are thinner than an eggnog without eggs." Reviewers for The Courier-News and the New York Post were more favorable.

== See also ==
- Adaptations of A Christmas Carol
- List of Christmas films
