= Cameron Bancroft (actor) =

Canadian actor

- Years active: 1986–present

Cameron Bancroft is a Canadian actor.

== Career ==
Bancroft is best known for playing Joe Bradley on the television series Beverly Hills, 90210. He was on the show from 1995 to 1996, and in the same year played Astronaut Zeke Beaumont in The Cape. In 2003, he joined his Beverly Hills alumni, Jason Priestley and Emma Caulfield, in Reality of Love. He played the male leading role in Code Name: Eternity in 1999 and 2000. In 2005, Bancroft guest-starred in season four of 24. He played field agent Lee Castle in nine episodes.

Bancroft has made numerous guest appearances on several television series. In 2005, he starred as Charles Ingalls in the television miniseries Little House on the Prairie. He also played the demon Cryto in the Charmed season two episode "How to Make a Quilt Out of Americans".

In 2007, he starred in the award-winning movie Country Remedy as a workaholic single parent and Chicago doctor named Evan Gibbs. In order to secure the job of a lifetime, he must first set up a clinic in a small mountain town in North Carolina.

In 2012, for the entirety of the second season of Blackstone, Bancroft portrayed the role of Dr. Kurt Ellis, a doctor who treats the Blackstone reservation and has an affair with Debbie Fraser. In Supernatural, he played the role of Dr. Gaines who was taken over by a Leviathan. He appeared in three episodes as this monstrous creature/doctor. In 2013 he played Ben, a star widower, in Garage Sale Mystery.

In 2014, he played Spencer in The Town that Came A-Courtin'. He played a supporting role in several episodes of the Canadian TV series The Beachcombers.

== Personal life ==
He has been married since 1999.

He taught acting in Vancouver at Tarlington Training, from 2014 to 2015.

As of January 2022, he teaches drama classes at Delta Secondary School.

== Filmography ==
=== Film ===
Year	Title	Role	Notes
1986	The Boy Who Could Fly	Joe	
1991	Rock 'n' Roll High School Forever	Jack	
1993	Love and Human Remains	Bernie	
1993	Anything for Love	Kurt Stark	
1995	Dream Man	Robert Reynolds	
1997	Sleeping Together	Bruce	
1998	L.A. Without a Map	Patterson	
1999	Mystery, Alaska	'Tinker' Connolly	
2001	MVP 2: Most Vertical Primate	Rob Poirier	
2002	Anything but Love	Greg Ellenbogen	
2007	Simple Things	Dr. Evan Gibbs	
2014	The Town That Came A-Courtin'	Spencer Alexander	
2018	In God I Trust	James	
2020	A Babysitter's Guide to Monster Hunting	Pete Ferguson	
TBA	Action #1	Detective Thomas	

=== Television ===
Year	Title	Role	Notes
1987–1990	The Beachcombers	Graham Blake	63 episodes
1990	Tour of Duty	Kemper	Episode: "Payback"
1990	83 Hours 'Til Dawn	David Burdock	Television film
1991	Out of This World	Malcolm	Episode: "Evie's Three Promises"
1993, 1994	Highlander: The Series	David Keogh / Robert	2 episodes
1994	Moment of Truth: To Walk Again	Eddie	Television film
1994	Moment of Truth: Broken Pledges	Mark	Television film
1994	For the Love of Nancy	Patrick	Television film
1995	A Family Divided	Chad Billingsley	Television film
1995	Extreme	Kyle Hansen	7 episodes
1995	The Other Mother: A Moment of Truth Movie	Jack	Television film
1995	She Stood Alone: The Tailhook Scandal	Rocket	Television film
1995	Zoya	Nicholas	Television film
1995–1996	Beverly Hills, 90210	Joe Bradley	23 episodes
1996	To Brave Alaska	Roger Lewis	Television film
1996–1997	The Cape	Ezekiel 'Zeke' Beaumont	17 episodes
1997	Convictions	Jeff Parker	Television film
2000	Charmed	Cryto	Episode: "How to Make a Quilt Out of Americans"
2000	Code Name: Eternity	Ethaniel	26 episodes
2001	Special Unit 2	Craig Richards	Episode: "The Pack"
2002	She's No Angel	Jed Benton	Television film
2002	The New Beachcombers	Scott Rivers	Television film
2002	He Sees You When You're Sleeping	Sterling Brooks	Television film
2003	The Crooked E: The Unshredded Truth About Enron	Duffy	Television film
2003	Undercover Christmas	Scott Shift	Television film
2004	I Want to Marry Ryan Banks	Larry	Television film
2004	Jake 2.0	Ben Wilton	Episode: "Dead Man Walking"
2004	A Beachcombers Christmas	Scott Rivers	Television film
2005	The Collector	Terry Handsworth	Episode: "The Campaign Manager"
2005	Little House on the Prairie	Charles Ingalls	6 episodes
2005	24	Lee Castle	9 episodes
2005	Reunion	Eric McManus	Episode: "1986"
2005	Beautiful People	Joe Seplar	4 episodes
2005	CSI: Miami	Byron Diller	Episode: "Shattered"
2006	The Path to 9/11	Mike McCormick	2 episodes
2006	Kraft Hockeyville	Cameron	7 episodes
2007	Don't Cry Now	Ross	Television film
2008	A Woman's Rage	Brian Hagan	Television film
2008	Mail Order Bride	Beau Canfield	Television film
2008	Flirting with Forty	Daniel Laurens	Television film
2008	Left Coast	Bill	Television film
2009	Ring of Deceit	Matt McAdams	Television film
2009	Smallville	Dr. Coats	Episode: "Rabid"
2011	Eureka	Dad	Episode: "Reprise"
2011	To the Mat	Kevin	Television film
2011	Supernatural	Dr. Gaines / Leviathan	3 episodes
2011–2013	The Haunting Hour: The Series	Dr. Wright / Scott Hardin / Sean	4 episodes
2012	Hannah's Law	James Beaumont	Television film
2012–2014	Blackstone	Dr. Kurt Ellis	8 episodes
2013	Psych	Ken Dowling	Episode: "Juliet Takes a Luvvah"
2013	Motive	Jack Bergin	Episode: "Public Enemy"
2013	Profile for Murder	Richard	Television film
2013	Garage Sale Mystery	Ben Douglas	Episode: "Garage Sale Mystery"
2013–2015	Cedar Cove	Will Jeffers	16 episodes
2015	Girlfriends' Guide to Divorce	Stuntman Steve	Episode: "Rule #32: F-you, Rob Frumpkis!"
2015	Once Upon a Time	Bill	Episode: "Lily"
2016	Legends of Tomorrow	Mr. Blake	Episode: "Blood Ties"
2016	The Wedding March	Josh Johnson	Television film
2017	Secrets of My Stepdaughter	Greg Kent	Television film
2017	Washed Away	Asher	Television film
2017	Chesapeake Shores	Carlton Chase	3 episodes
2018	When Calls the Heart	Mr. Weston	Episode: "Hearts and Minds"
2018	Unreal	Preston Palmer	3 episodes
2018	Morning Show Mysteries	Victor Anderson	Episode: "Murder on the Menu"
2018	A Midnight Kiss	Gary Pearson	Television film
2018–2019	Michelle's	Hank Deveraux	5 episodes
2018–2020	NarcoLeap	Gregory Atkins	7 episodes
2019	Unspeakable	Michael Rodell	Episode: "Heat-Treatment (1984 - 1985)"
2019	Hailey Dean Mysteries	Robert Harms	Episode: "A Prescription for Murder"
2020	Martha's Vineyard Mysteries	Willard Gilford	Episode: "Riddled with Deceit"
2020	When the Streetlights Go On	Mr. Monroe	5 episodes
2021	A Little Daytime Drama	Gregory James	Television film
2021	Coyote Creek Christmas	Rick Parker	Television film
