= Loyal Opposition: Terror in the White House =

1998 American television film

- DVD cover
- Written by: Jeff Wynne; Rick Gitelson
- Directed by: Mark Sobel
- Starring: Joan Van Ark
- Country of origin: United States
- Original language: English

Production
- Producers: Paul Colichman; Rick Gitelson; Mark R. Harris; Simon Abbott; James Shavick

Original release
- Network: The Family Channel
- Release: March 8, 1998

Loyal Opposition: Terror in the White House is an American made-for-television thriller-drama film that aired on The Family Channel on March 8, 1998.

== Plot ==
When a terrorist surfaces, the Chairman of the Joint Chiefs of Staff, General James Metzger (Nick Mancuso) urges President Mark Hayden (Lloyd Bochner) for a military response. However, the President prefers to try negotiating. So, the General takes the President hostage and launches an offensive of his own. The first female Vice President Elizabeth Lane (Joan Van Ark) is the only one who can do something about it and must fight mutineers in the White House to rescue him.

== Cast ==
- Joan Van Ark – Vice President Elizabeth Lane
- Nick Mancuso – General James Metzger
- Rick Springfield – Senator Barklay
- Lloyd Bochner – President Mark Hayden
- Corbin Bernsen – Secret Service Agent John Gray
- Don Diamont – Secret Service Agent John Vendome
- Joel Palmer – Kevin Lane
- Nathaniel DeVeaux – Scott Davies
- Malcolm Stewart – Admiral Edward Fellows
- Bob Morrisey – Krell
- Garvin Cross – Williams
- Eli Gabay – Hobson
- Ken Roberts – General Erickson
- Garry Chalk – Col. Gardener
- Brian Downey – Ben Harrison

== See also ==
- List of action films of the 1990s
- Air Force One (1997)
