= Chief Dan George =

Chief of the Tsleil-Waututh Nation, actor (1899–1981)

Chief Dan George OC
- Born: Geswanouth Slahoot; July 24, 1899; Tsleil-Waututh, North Vancouver, British Columbia, Canada
- Died: September 23, 1981 (aged 82); North Vancouver, British Columbia, Canada
- Occupations: Author; poet; actor
- Years active: 1951–1981
- Relatives: Lee Maracle (granddaughter); Charlene Aleck (granddaughter); Joan Phillip (granddaughter); Columpa Bobb (great-granddaughter)

Chief Dan George OC (born Geswanouth Slahoot; July 24, 1899 – September 23, 1981) was a chief of the Tsleil-Waututh Nation, a Coast Salish band whose Indian reserve is located on Burrard Inlet in the southeast area of the District of North Vancouver, British Columbia, Canada. He also was an actor, musician, poet and author. The Chief's best-known written work is My Heart Soars. As an actor, he is best remembered for portraying Old Lodge Skins opposite Dustin Hoffman in Little Big Man (1970), for which he was nominated for the Academy Award for Best Supporting Actor, and for his role in The Outlaw Josey Wales (1976), as Lone Watie, opposite Clint Eastwood.

== Early life ==
Born as Geswanouth Slahoot in North Vancouver, his English name was originally Dan Slaholt. The surname was changed to George when he entered a residential school at age 5. He worked at a number of different jobs, including as a longshoreman, construction worker, and school bus driver, and was band chief of the Tsleil-Waututh Nation from 1951 to 1963 (then called the Burrard Indian Band).

== Acting career ==
=== 1960–1970: Early roles and breakthrough ===
In 1960, when he was already 60 years old, he landed his first acting job in a CBC Television series, Cariboo Country, as the character Ol' Antoine (pron. "Antwine"). He performed the same role in a Walt Disney Studios film Smith! (1969), adapted from an episode in the series The High Chaparral (the episode in turn being based on Breaking Smith's Quarter Horse, a novella by Paul St. Pierre).

In 1970, at age 71, he received several honours for his role in Arthur Penn's film Little Big Man, including a nomination for the Academy Award for Best Supporting Actor.

=== 1971–1981: Subsequent success ===
In 1971, he played Chief Red Cloud in "Warbonnet", the 14th episode of Season 13 of the Western series Bonanza. He played the role of Rita Joe's father in George Ryga's stage play, The Ecstasy of Rita Joe, in performances at Vancouver, the National Arts Centre in Ottawa, and Washington, D.C.

In 1972, he was among the guests in David Winters's television special The Special London Bridge Special. That same year he acted in the film Paul Bogart's Cancel My Reservation, and got the recurring role of Chief Moses Charlie in the comedy-drama television series The Beachcombers, a role he would revisit until his death in 1981.

In 1973, he played the role of "Ancient Warrior" in an episode of the TV show Kung Fu. That same year George recorded "My Blue Heaven" with the band Fireweed, with "Indian Prayer" on the reverse. His album, Chief Dan George & Fireweed – In Circle, was released in 1974 comprising these songs and seven others.

The following year he had roles in Alien Thunder (1974), The Bears and I (1974), and Harry and Tonto (1974).

In 1975, he portrayed the character Chief Stillwater in the "Showdown at Times Square" episode in Season 6 of McCloud.

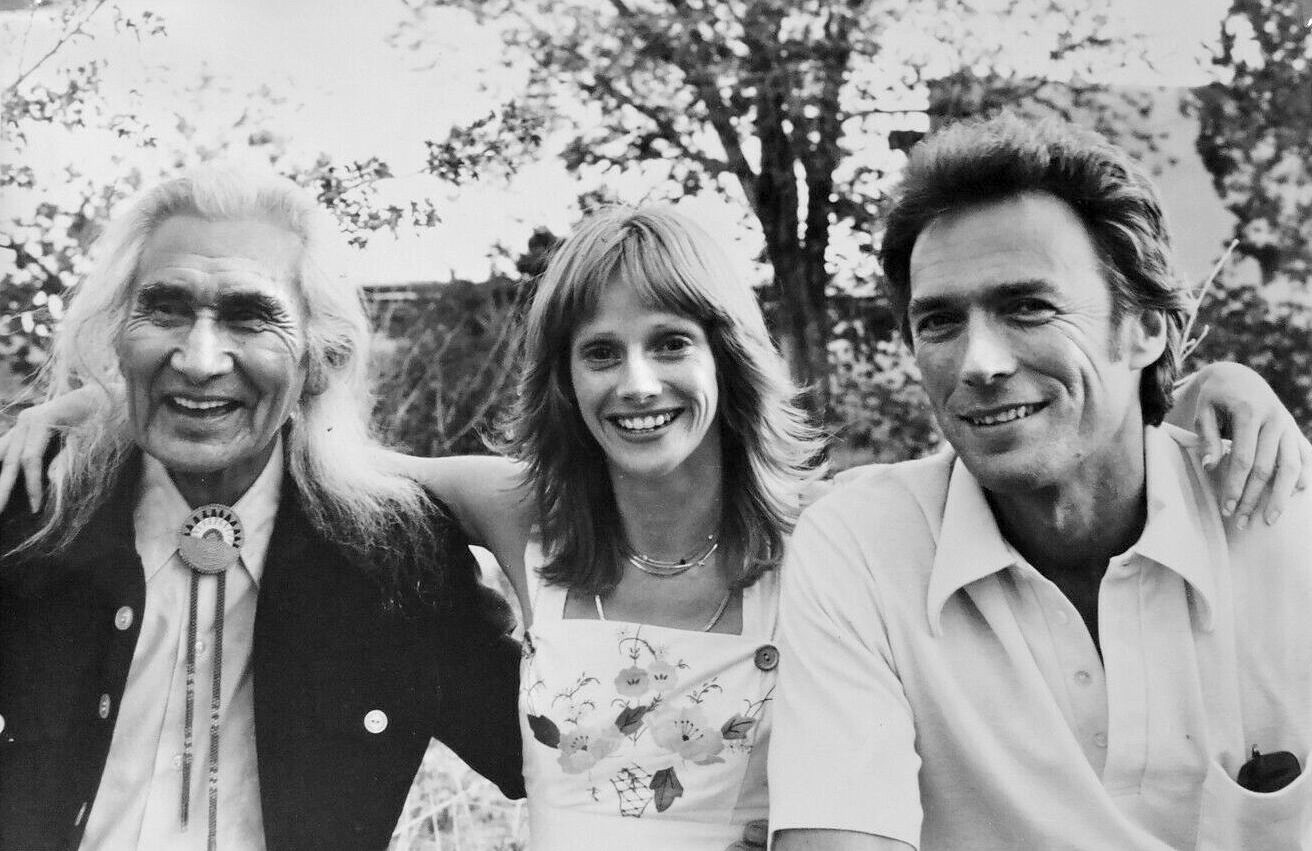
Dan George with Sondra Locke and Clint Eastwood at a barbecue in Santa Fe, New Mexico, promoting The Outlaw Josey Wales (1976).

In 1976 he acted in Clint Eastwood's The Outlaw Josey Wales, and George McCowan's Shadow of the Hawk.

On television the following year he had a role in the 1978 miniseries Centennial, based on the book by James A. Michener.

In 1979, he acted in Americathon, and Spirit of the Wind.

In 1980 he had his final film role in Nothing Personal.

=== 1984: Posthumous written work ===
George was well known for his poetic writing style and in 1974, George wrote My Heart Soars followed by My Spirit Soars in 1983, both published by Hancock House Publishers. The two books were later combined to form The Best of Chief Dan George which went on to become a best seller and continues to sell well today. One of his better known pieces of poetry A Lament for Confederation has become one of his most widely known works.

== Death ==
The Chief died at Lions Gate Hospital in North Vancouver in 1981 at the age of 82. He was interred at Burrard Cemetery.

== Family and descendants ==
Dan George's granddaughter Lee Maracle was a poet, author, activist, and professor. His granddaughter Charlene Aleck is an actress who performed for 18 years on The Beachcombers on CBC. His granddaughter Joan Phillip was the BC NDP MLA for Vancouver-Mount Pleasant. His great-granddaughter Columpa Bobb is an actress and poet. His grandson Rueben George is a writer and activist who published the book It Stops Here: Standing Up for Our Lands, Our Waters, and Our People in 2023.

Chief Dan George's grand-nephew, Chief Jesse "Nighthawk" George, currently resides in Chesapeake, Virginia, and is the Inter-Tribal Peace Chief for the Commonwealth of Virginia.

== Activism ==
During his acting career, he worked to promote better understanding by non-aboriginals of the First Nations people. His soliloquy, Lament for Confederation, an indictment of the appropriation of native territory by European colonialism, was performed at the City of Vancouver's celebration of the Canadian Centennial in 1967. This speech is credited with escalating native political activism in Canada and touching off widespread pro-native sentiment among non-natives.

== Accolades ==
Chief Dan George received the following accolades for Little Big Man.

Award	Category	Result
Academy Awards	Best Supporting Actor	Nominated
Golden Globe Awards	Best Supporting Actor	Nominated
New York Film Critics Circle Awards	Best Supporting Actor	Won
National Society of Film Critics Awards	Best Supporting Actor	Won
Laurel Awards	Best Supporting Performance, Male	Won

== Honours and legacy ==
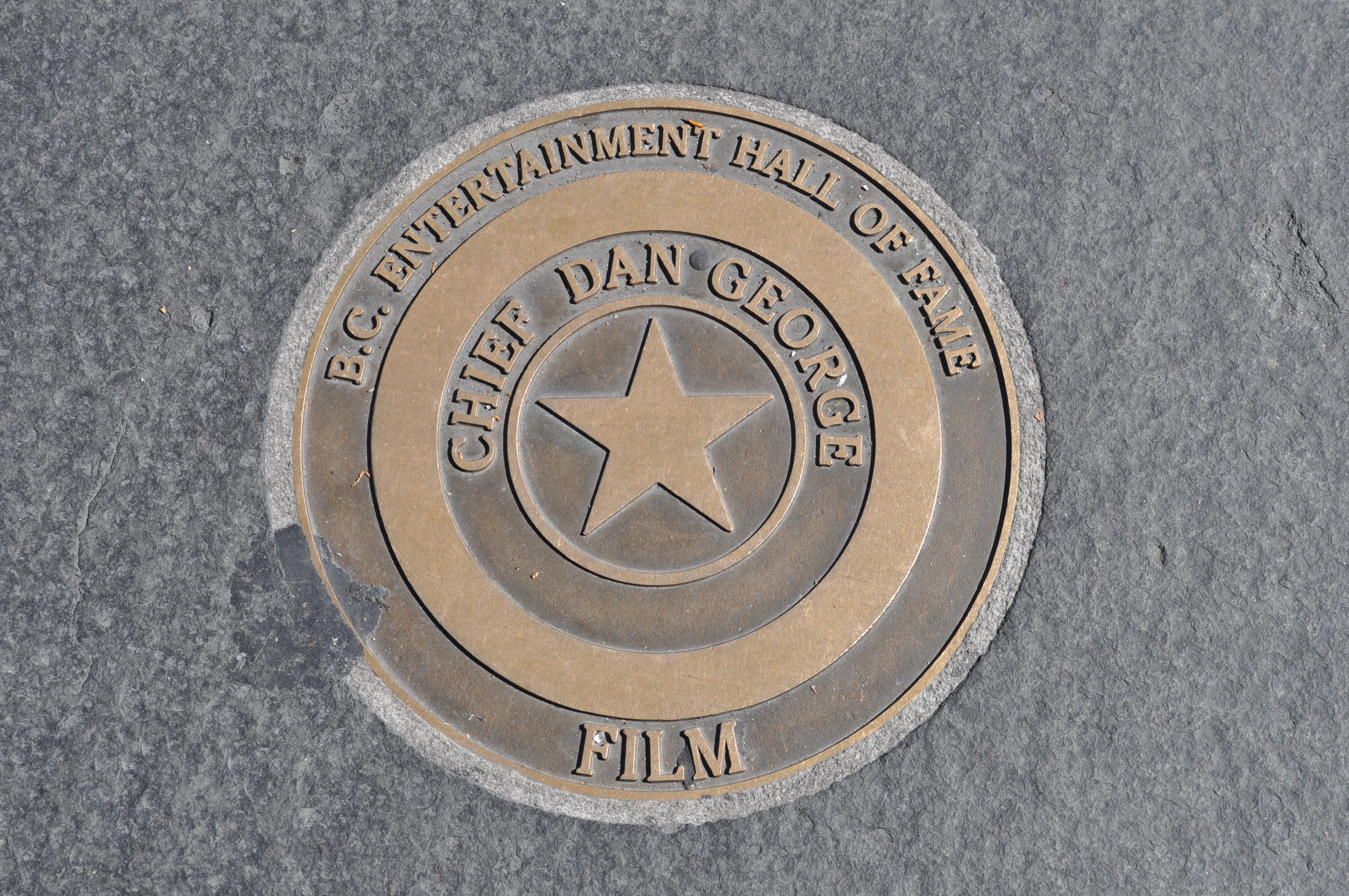
Dan George's B.C. Entertainment Hall of Fame star on Granville Street, Vancouver, BC

In 1971, George was made an Officer of the Order of Canada.

He was included on the Golden Rule Poster under "Native Spirituality" with the quote: "We are as much alive as we keep the earth alive".

Canadian actor Donald Sutherland narrated the following quote from his poem "My Heart Soars" in the opening ceremonies of the 2010 Winter Olympics in Vancouver.

The beauty of the trees,
the softness of the air,
the fragrance of the grass,
speaks to me.
And my heart soars.

=== Legacy ===
- Chief Dan George Middle School in Abbotsford, British Columbia
- Chief Dan George Public School in Toronto, Ontario
- Chief Dan George Theatre, Phoenix Theatre, University of Victoria, British Columbia

In 2008 Canada Post issued a postage stamp in its "Canadians in Hollywood" series featuring Chief Dan George.

== Filmography ==
Man Belongs to the Earth (1974), an IMAX short environmentalist documentary film starring George

Year	Title	Role	Notes
1969	Smith!	Ol' Antoine	
1970	Little Big Man	Old Lodge Skins	
1972	Cancel My Reservation	Old Bear	
1972	À bon pied, bon oeil		
1972-1981	The Beachcombers	Chief Moses Charlie	8 episodes
1974	Alien Thunder	Sounding Sky	
1974	The Bears and I	Chief Peter A-Tas-Ka-Nay	
1974	Harry and Tonto	Sam Two Feathers	
1974	Man Belongs to the Earth	Himself	
1974	Chief Dan George Speaks	Himself	
1975	Cold Journey		
1976	The Outlaw Josey Wales	Lone Watie	
1976	Shadow of the Hawk	Old Man Hawk	
1978	Pump It Up		
1979	Americathon	Sam Birdwater	
1979	Spirit of the Wind	Moses	
1979	The Incredible Hulk	Lone Wolf	Season 2, Episode 19, "Kindred Spirits"
1980	Nothing Personal	Oscar	

== Written works ==
- George, Dan, and Helmut Hirnschall. My Heart Soars. Toronto: Clarke, Irwin, 1974. ISBN 0-919654-15-0
- George, Dan, and Helmut Hirnschall. My Spirit Soars. Surrey, B.C., Canada: Hancock House, 1982. ISBN 0-88839-154-4
- Mortimer, Hilda, and Dan George. You Call Me Chief: Impressions of the Life of Chief Dan George. Toronto: Doubleday Canada, 1981. ISBN 0-385-04806-8
- George, Dan, and Helmut Hirnschall. The Best of Chief Dan George. Surrey, B.C.: Hancock House, 2003. ISBN 0-88839-544-2

== See also ==
- Dark Cloud
- Chief Thundercloud
- Iron Eyes Cody
- History of Squamish and Tsleil-Waututh longshoremen, 1863–1963
- Indigenous Canadian personalities
- Indigenous peoples of the Pacific Northwest Coast
