= To Brave Alaska =

- Written by: Carol Mendelsohn
- Directed by: Bruce Pittman
- Starring: Alyssa Milano; Cameron Bancroft
- Music by: Louis Natale
- Countries of origin: United States; Canada
- Original language: English

Production
- Producer: Lynne Bespflug
- Cinematography: Michael Storey
- Editor: Ralph Brunjes
- Running time: 89 minutes

Original release
- Network: ABC
- Release: November 3, 1996

To Brave Alaska is a 1996 American made-for-TV adventure film directed by Bruce Pittman. Based on a true story, the film stars Alyssa Milano and Cameron Bancroft as a young couple who attempt to survive in the rough Alaskan wilderness.

== Plot ==
Set in 1979, the film focuses on a Seattleite couple, police officer and former park ranger Roger Lewis (Bancroft), and 22-year-old waitress Denise Harris (Milano). They are invited by businessman Wylie Bennett (Fraser) to Alaska to head out to the fictional wilderness of Surprise Bay and find a goldmine. If they are successful in retrieving gold, they are awarded 10% of the profit. Denise is hesitant to travel into the wilderness, though blindly follows her boyfriend, who regards the exploring as a great adventure. They are flown to the location, roughly 75 miles away from the nearest 'civilization', with just a dog and a radio with bad reception. There, they are set up in a cabin, where they spend their first couple of weeks. When they realize that their food supply is running out and that nobody is coming to help them, they become afraid. Roger considers shooting a deer, but Denise opposes such due to her vegetarianism.

Even though sometime later they find their first gold, they realize that it will not buy them dinner in the wilderness. With winter coming, they decide that they must head back to civilization. They gather supplies and their gold and take the canoe, considering it is their only form of transportation. By day three, a storm throws Denise in the water and swamps the canoe. By day five, Bill DeCreeft (Rekert), the aviator who flew them to their Surprise Bay destination, finds out that nobody flew out to the couple for a food supply, and starts a search for them. Roger and Denise, meanwhile, have set out a camp near the river in hope of a boat sailing by. When they realize that they are all alone, they know that they have to travel inland, despite the dangers, and they are forced to turn their weaknesses into strengths in order to survive.

While Bill starts a major search, Roger and Denise have to face several obstacles. Denise loses their food supply when she struggles to cross a river; Roger gets mad at her for not having tied the food supply to the rope that she used. She tries to apologize, but he does not listen until he almost falls to his death shortly after. The temperature grows colder rapidly, and they not only have to worry about dying from starvation, but also from hypothermia. Furthermore, Denise almost dies when she breaks through ice and falls in freezing water. Somehow she makes it out, and, regarding it as a miracle, she grows determined to make it to civilization, despite the fact that Roger is now losing hope.

As days pass by without food, Denise suggests eating the dog. Roger refuses to kill Newman, explaining that he loves the dog too much. By day fourteen, Roger has contracted frostbite and is unable to talk. Roger wants to accept that they are dying and proposes to end their lives with their remaining bullets, but Denise refuses to give up. By day seventeen, they spot a helicopter led by DeCreeft that is looking for them, but the helicopter crew fails to notice them. Realizing that there is a search out for them, Denise convinces Roger to travel to open land and create a signal. By day nineteen, they are spotted and rescued by DeCreeft.

== Cast ==
- Alyssa Milano as Denise Harris
- Cameron Bancroft as Roger Lewis
- Winston Rekert as Bill DeCreeft
- Paul Dignard as Budd Sills
- Barbara Tyson as Barbara DeCreeft
- Duncan Fraser as Wylie Bennett
- Philip Granger as Mike McCarthy

== Production ==
Filming took place in British Columbia and Alberta, Canada. The cast and crew had to ride the snowmobile to the set for two miles every day. Milano commented in a 1997 interview: "We had our costumes padded with heat packs, but it got so cold that I would lay on the dog (Newman) to keep warm." Shooting completed on May 26, 1996.

== Reception ==
The reviewer of Variety wrote that "other than the consistently vapid behavior of lead characters, Mendelsohn’s script does its job with occasional flashes of wit, and Bruce Pittman’s direction is on the money. And whenever the action flags, there are acres upon acres of handsome “Alaskan” scenery (shot in Alberta, Canada, in part by aerial cameraman Robert Mehnert), well illuminated by d.p. Michael Storey."

The reviewer of The New York Times was less enthusiastic, and wrote that Milano and Bancroft gave worse performances than the film's dog.

== Home media ==
The film was released on DVD first in Asia. A region 1 release was followed on January 17, 2006.
