= The Manipulators =

- Genre: Drama
- Created by: Ed McGibbon
- Country of origin: Canada
- Original language: English
- No. of seasons: 1

Production
- Executive producer: Philip Keatley
- Running time: 60 minutes

Original release
- Network: CBC Television
- Release: 28 January 1970 – 5 September 1971

The Manipulators is a Canadian drama television series that aired on CBC Television from 1970 to 1971.

== Premise ==
Parole officers and their clients are featured characters in this colour filmed series. Its working title was The Double Bind, reflecting the dual responsibilities of parole officers to both former prisoners and the legal system. The production was based on The Clients, a pilot half-hour series broadcast locally in Vancouver.

== Cast ==
- Marc Strange as Rick Nicholson
- Roxanne Irwin as Maggie Campbell
- Gregory Nash as Campbell's son
- Al Kozlik as Bill
- Anthony Holland as Clem
- Dorothy Davies as the staff psychologist

== Scheduling ==
This hour-long series was broadcast on Wednesdays at 8:30 p.m. (Eastern) for five episodes from 28 January to 25 February 1970 for its first season. Its second and final season aired seven episodes on Sundays at 9:00 p.m. from 31 January to 14 March 1971. Episodes were rebroadcast from 25 July to 5 September 1971.

== Episodes ==
=== Season 1 ===
- "The Spike in the Wall", starring Linda Goranson, Jace Vander Veen (Daryl Duke director)
- "Where There Is Fear" (Don Eccleston director)
- "Now I Lay Me Down To Sleep" (Daryl Duke director)

=== Season 2 ===
- "Turn to the Wind", starring Jace Vander Veen
- "The Code", starring Joseph Golland, Ted Rekert
- "Bell And Bonnie, Bonnie And Bell", starring Rae Brown, Judy De Moor, Ivor Harris
- "X-Kalay", starring Margot Kidder

== Awards ==
Linda Goranson won the Canadian Film Award for Best Actress in a Non-Feature at the 22nd Canadian Film Awards for the episode "The Spike in the Wall". Her performance, in which her character removed her blouse to attract her husband's attention, was controversial as the first topless scene ever broadcast on Canadian network television.
