= Must Be Santa (film) =

- Genre: Christmas, family
- Written by: Douglas Bowie
- Directed by: Brad Turner
- Starring: Arnold Pinnock; Deanna Milligan; Dabney Coleman
- Country of origin: Canada
- Original language: English

Production
- Producer: Robert Sherrin
- Cinematography: Albert J. Dunk
- Running time: 120 minutes

Original release
- Network: CBC
- Release: 12 December 1999

Must Be Santa is a 1999 Canadian television film that tells the story of Floyd Court (Arnold Pinnock), who is selected as the successor to Santa Claus. Robert Sherrin produced the film while Brad Turner was director.

At the time of its release, it was considered to be one of the most expensive such projects ever produced by the Canadian Broadcasting Corporation. It was made more expensive when production of the film was interrupted in February 1999 by a strike of the CBC's technicians. Production resumed in May after a labor settlement.

Joe Flaherty makes an appearance as his SCTV character Count Floyd.

The film won a Gemini Award in 2000 for Best Visual Effects.

Universal Studios provided international distribution.

== Cast ==
- Arnold Pinnock - Floyd Court
- Dabney Coleman - Tuttle
- Deanna Milligan - Natalie Fairlie
- Joe Flaherty - Count Floyd
- Keenan MacWilliam - Heather

== See also ==
- List of Christmas films
- Santa Claus in film
