= The Devil You Know (TV program) =

American documentary TV series (2011–2013)

- Country of origin: United States
- No. of seasons: 3
- No. of episodes: 32

Production
- Production company: Make Believe Media

Original release
- Network: Investigation Discovery
- Release: June 15, 2011 – December 19, 2013

The Devil You Know is an American documentary television program broadcast on the Investigation Discovery (ID) cable television channel. The program debuted on June 15, 2011, when it was one of five new crime documentary television series released on ID in summer 2011. The program aired for three seasons, with its final episode airing on December 19, 2013.

== Summary ==
The program explores stories of crime mysteries and secret lives of men and women who are supposedly law-abiding citizens but in reality are people with deadly intentions causing pain to their loved ones. Members of families and friends of those affected are interviewed in order to present first-hand accounts of the lives of people who have been betrayed and hurt by these criminals.

Notable cases covered by the programme include Stacey Castor, Gary Ridgway, and Michael Mastromarino.
