= The Beachcombers =

Canadian television series (1972–1990)

- Genre: Comedy drama
- Created by: Marc Strange; Lynn Susan Strange
- Developed by: Philip Keatley
- Starring: Bruno Gerussi; Robert Clothier; Rae Brown; Pat John; Jackson Davies; Charlene Aleck; Joe Austin; Dion Luther
- Country of origin: Canada
- No. of seasons: 19
- No. of episodes: 387

Production
- Running time: 30 minutes

Original release
- Network: CBC
- Release: October 1, 1972 – December 12, 1990

The Beachcombers is a Canadian comedy drama television series that ran on CBC Television from October 1, 1972, to December 12, 1990. With over 350 episodes, it is one of the longest-running dramatic series ever made for Canadian English-language television.

== Series overview ==
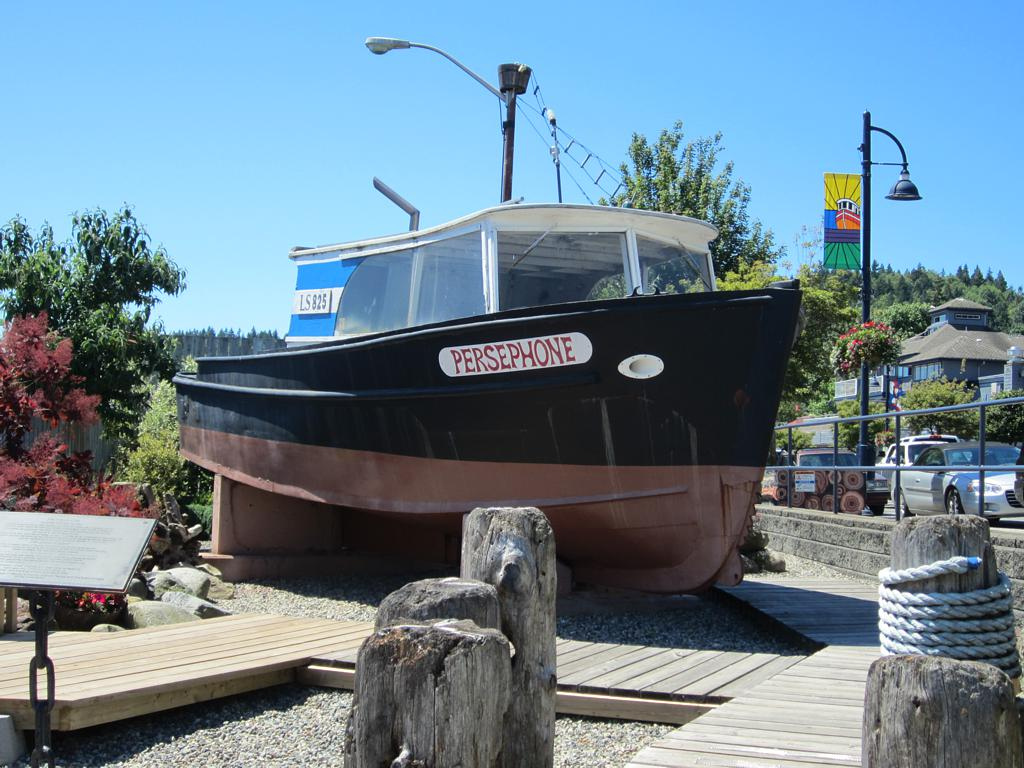
Persephone, in 2013

The Beachcombers followed the life of Nick Adonidas (Bruno Gerussi), a Greek Canadian log salvager in British Columbia who earned a living traveling the coastline northwest of Vancouver with his partner Jesse Jim (Pat John) aboard their logging tug Persephone tracking down logs that broke away from barges and logging booms. Their chief business competitor is Relic (Robert Clothier) (whose very rarely used real name is Stafford T. Phillips), a somewhat unsavoury person who will occasionally go to great lengths to steal business (and logs) from Nick.

The series also focused on a supporting cast of characters in Nick's hometown of Gibsons, often centering on a café, Molly's Reach, run by Molly (Rae Brown), a mother figure to virtually all the characters in the series (including Relic). In addition, Molly rented out a room to Nick as living quarters and office space for his salvage business. Molly had two grandchildren living with her, Hughie (Bob Park) and his younger sister Margaret played by Nancy Chapple in the first season then by Juliet Randall from the second season onward. RCMP Constable John Constable (played by Alberta-born Jackson Davies) was the lawman.

Nick and Jesse mooring Persephone

The series' pilot episode was called "Jesse's Car" and was turned down by CBC for broadcast. The first episode to air was called "Partners" and described how Jesse and Nick formed their business ties.

During the run of the series, storylines became more complex as the characters developed. Many episodes focused on Nick's Greek heritage. Brown retired from the series in 1986, with Molly's Reach taken over by new proprietor Dana Battle (Janet-Laine Green) for the final seasons.

The series' musical score was composed and orchestrated by Canadian composer and producer Bobby Hales and later by Vancouver-based composer, Claire Lawrence. Numerous Vancouver-area musical artists appeared on the soundtracks of the series, including Cos Natola.

== Changes to original series ==
The series' removed "The" from its title, becoming simply Beachcombers in 1988 (with the CBC announcing that the intent was to give the aging show a new look), coinciding with the replacement of the show's original theme music with a new composition. Subsequent funding cutbacks at the government-supported CBC, however, led to Beachcombers being cancelled even though it was still popular in its homeland and syndicated around the world, though attempts to revamp the series by giving it more suspenseful storylines and making it more action oriented met with fan criticism.

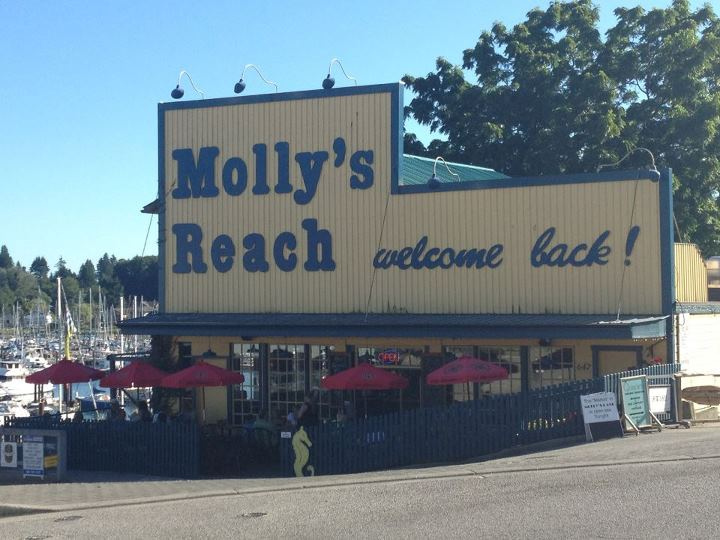
Molly's Reach, as featured in the program

The final episode had Nick Adonidas accused of stealing logs during a time when rising expenses were causing many beachcombers to seek another occupation. The story ended with Nick saying to Relic, “We gave ‘em a run for their money, didn’t we?”

== Multicultural ==
The show was an active window into Canada's multicultural heritage. Gerussi's character, Nick Adonidas was a Greek and one storyline in a later season chronicled Nick's return to his homeland, while Clothier's character, Relic, was of Welsh ancestry.

Pat John, who played Jesse Jim, was a member of the shíshálh Nation. Other Indigenous cast members were Charlene Aleck as Jesse's sister Sara, Marianne Jones as Jesse's wife Laurel, and Chief Dan George as Chief Moses Charlie.

== Spin-off series, TV movies, reboot series ==
A short lived spin-off television show called Constable Constable ran in 1985. The show was based on Jackson Davies's Beachcombers character Constable John Constable. The series was filmed in Vancouver and starred Jackson Davies and Walter Learning.

Jackson Davies, Pat John and Charlene Aleck were the only original-series cast members who had speaking parts in the show's follow up television movie The New Beachcombers, produced in 2002, a pilot for a revived series that ran for two years. Bob Park (Hugh) and Dion Luther (Pat) appeared in cameo roles. By this time, Gerussi, Clothier, and Brown all had died, so new characters were introduced played by (among others) Dave Thomas, Graham Greene, Cameron Bancroft, and Deanna Milligan. A sequel, A Beachcombers Christmas, was also produced.

A documentary about the show called Welcome Back to Molly's Reach aired in 2002. On July 27–29, 2007, former cast and crew gathered in Gibsons, British Columbia, for the show's 35th anniversary.

A best selling book, Bruno and The Beach: The Beachcombers at 40 celebrating its 40th anniversary was released in December 2012. It was co-written by Marc Strange, co-creator of the series, and Jackson Davies, who starred in the series as Constable John Constable.

In October 2022, it was announced that The Beachcombers would be remade as an animated series that was slated to air in Spring 2023 but is currently delayed.

== Filming locations ==
The series was filmed on location in Gibsons, British Columbia, and the surrounding area. The café featured in the show was built as a hardware store in 1934 and served various retail functions until rented as a film set for the series, used mainly for exterior shots and storage. The building only became a café after the series ended. After The Beachcombers was cancelled in 1990, the building sat vacant for a time with an uncertain future. Eventually, investors converted it into a functioning restaurant under the television-inspired name "Molly's Reach". As of August 2023, the restaurant was closed and the property was available for lease, but as of January 2026 it is operational as a cafe again.

Persephone, the boat used by Nick Adonidas during filming, was a tug and work boat named John Henry built in 1965. The tug was chartered during series production from Harry Smith, who donated it to the town of Gibsons in 1991. The vessel sat outside at a town works department gravel pit where it deteriorated quite badly until it was restored by the Sunshine Coast Museum and Archives. Persephone was installed in a small park near Molly's Reach in 2007.

There were two jet boats used by the character Relic. The one most fans remember was called Hi Baller II and was used from the second season until the end. The first craft, Hi Baller I, was used for just the first season. She was slightly smaller than her successor and had more square windows. She did reappear for an episode called "Jet Boat Gemini" in 1974. Both boats were seen together as the man in the second craft was impersonating Relic. He was stealing logs and hassling local residents until Relic saved the day at the end in a duel of jet boats.

== International broadcasts ==
The series was syndicated around the world and was shown by ITV in the United Kingdom, SCTV in Indonesia and on PBS (as well as in syndication on commercial stations) in the United States. It has also been shown in Australia, New Zealand, Hong Kong, South Africa, Ireland, Greece, Italy, Kuwait, Seychelles, Malaysia, Brunei, Mexico and Egypt. The West German television station ZDF also broadcast the series, as Strandpiraten ("Beach Pirates").

The show was seen in reruns on Vision TV and the pre-news channel version of Sun TV in Canada as well as the Aboriginal Peoples Television Network (APTN) in Canada and ALN in the United States.

== Media references ==
- The show was featured in the 2001 video for Same Thing Twice by The Flashing Lights.
- The show and its main characters were referenced by some of the characters on a 2007 episode of Corner Gas called "Cable Excess" in a failed attempt at comparing themselves to the show. The character, Brent Leroy, rhetorically asks "You think maybe The Beachcombers was the best Canadian TV show of all time?"
- The show was referenced in a 2019 episode of The Simpsons called "D'oh Canada".
