= Robert Clothier =

Canadian actor, artist (1921–1999)

- Born: Robert Allan Clothier; October 21, 1921; Prince Rupert, British Columbia, Canada
- Died: February 10, 1999 (aged 77); North Vancouver, British Columbia, Canada

Robert Allan Clothier, DFC (October 21, 1921 – February 10, 1999) was a Canadian stage and television actor most famous for his role as Relic on the CBC television series, The Beachcombers.

== Biography ==
Clothier joined the Royal Canadian Air Force at an early age during the Second World War. He learned to fly at No. 1 Elementary Flying School in Malton and No. 4 Service Flying Training School in Saskatoon, and flew two tours operationally with 408 Squadron RCAF. He was awarded the Distinguished Flying Cross on December 5, 1944, the citation reading,

This officer has completed numerous sorties in the role of pilot, involving attacks on most of the enemy's heavily defended targets. On all occasions he has pressed home his attacks with great determination and by his personal example of courage, coolness and confidence has set an example which has inspired all with whom he has flown.

On December 23, 1944, while serving as an instructor with No. 5 Operational Training Unit in Boundary Bay, British Columbia, F/L Clothier was the pilot of a Mitchell bomber that crashed on takeoff. Three on board were killed and Clothier was the only survivor, but he was severely injured with a broken back. He was paralyzed from the waist down for two years. His brother, F/L John George Clothier, was also a pilot in Bomber Command and was killed March 5–6, 1945.

After the war, Clothier studied Architecture at the University of British Columbia followed by a stay in England studying theatre. Clothier returned to British Columbia, eventually settling in the Capilano Highlands area of North Vancouver and became well known in the Vancouver area as a stage actor as well as an accomplished sculptor and painter.

== Artist ==
From 1949 to 1954, while studying in England, Clothier did cover art and story art for British science fiction magazines New Worlds, Nebula Science Fiction and Science Fantasy.

== Acting ==
=== The Beachcombers ===
In The Beachcombers he portrayed Bruno Gerussi's rival beachcomber, Relic – a curmudgeonly, conniving man of Welsh descent who lived on a house boat and used his jetboat to outrun and challenge Nick's claims to logs.

After landing this memorable role, Clothier became a household face among viewers, as the show originally aired from 1972 to 1990, one of the longest running Canadian television dramas of all time. Despite Relic's role as Nick' Adonidas' antagonist, his character was well loved by viewers who enjoyed his antics and frequent comeuppance. Relic's actual character-name was Stafford Phillips. Relic was once referred to as "Taffy," a reference to an English nursery rhyme, "Taffy was a Welshman."

Clothier had a dispute with CBC over royalties he believed were owed to him for reruns and overseas sales of The Beachcombers.

=== Other roles ===
After The Beachcombers ended its lengthy run, Clothier continued to perform in TV and film productions made in Canada, including two episodes of the American series The X-Files (which was filmed in Vancouver for 7 of its 11 seasons) and a recurring role in Jake and the Kid . In Da Vinci's Inquest (1998), he played the role of Da Vinci's dying father.

He guest-starred as Mr. Potter in Due South Episode #130 "One Good Man a.k.a. Thank You Kindly, Mr. Capra".

== Honours ==
In 1995, the North Shore Arts Commission, of North Vancouver, British Columbia, honoured Clothier with its first FANS award for his contribution to the arts.

== Personal life ==
In 1996, Clothier suffered a stroke and was in poor health until his death in 1999. After his stroke, he taught himself to paint with his left hand. He and his wife, Shirley Broderick, had two children, a daughter, Jessica, and a son, John and grandchildren, Lucy and Sam. He was also a fan of Renault automobiles; he had a small collection of Renault 17 Gordini cars at his property in North Vancouver through the 1970s and 1980s.
