= The New Beachcombers =

Canadian television series

- Developed by: Jackson Davies
- Starring: Cameron Bancroft; Deanna Milligan; Dave Thomas; Graham Greene; Jackson Davies
- Country of origin: Canada
- No. of seasons: 2

Original release
- Network: CBC
- Release: 2002 – 2004

The New Beachcombers was a renewal of the CBC's long-running series The Beachcombers, which ran for 19 seasons from 1972 to 1990. A movie of the week directed by Brad Turner was broadcast in November 2002, to commemorate both the CBC's fiftieth anniversary, and the thirtieth anniversary of the original show's first episode. The Movie of the Week, "The New Beachcombers" served as a pilot for a new series, "The New Beachcombers", that played from 2002 to 2004. A behind-the-scenes documentary film was produced in association with The New Beachcombers, called "Welcome Back to Molly’s Reach", that was released in 2003. A final TV movie made after the new series, "A Beachcombers Christmas" was aired in 2004.

Bruno Gerussi, the actor who played Nick, the Greek-Canadian log-salvager, in the original Beachcomber series, had died. In the new show, Cameron Bancroft, who played a teenager in the original series, returns to Gibson's Landing, playing a new character, Scott, to take over Nick's old tug, the Persephone, and to take over Nick's old salvage business.

Much of the original series took place in the then fictional cafe Molly's Reach. In the new series the cafe is at risk of being torn down, and redeveloped, and Scott and other characters take sides over whether this redevelopment should be allowed.

Jackson Davies, the actor who played RCMP Constable John Constable from 1974 until the end of the original series, returned to play the Constable character, and also served as an Executive Producer.
