= Bruno Gerussi =

Canadian stage and television actor (1928–1995)

Bruno Santos Gerussi
- Born: 7 May 1928; Medicine Hat, Alberta, Canada
- Died: 21 November 1995 (aged 67); Vancouver, British Columbia, Canada
- Occupation: Actor
- Years active: 1953–1995
- Children: 2

Bruno Santos Gerussi (7 May 1928 – 21 November 1995) was a Canadian stage and television actor, best known for the lead role in the CBC Television series The Beachcombers from 1972 to 1990. He also performed onstage at the Stratford Festival, worked in radio, and hosted Celebrity Cooks, a daily cooking/variety show, on CBC from 1975 to 1979 then on the Global Television Network from 1980 to 1987.

== Early life and education ==
Gerussi was born in Medicine Hat, Alberta, as the eldest son of Enrico Gerussi, a coal miner working in Lethbridge, who had trained in Italy as a stonemason, and his wife Teresina Lazzorotto. The two married in 1927 and moved to Medicine Hat. The family subsequently moved to Exshaw, where Enrico worked as a sectionman on the Canadian Pacific Railway.

Bruno Gerussi grew up in Exshaw and later moved with his family to New Westminster, British Columbia. He attended the Banff School of Fine Arts on a scholarship. Bruno was only 22 when his father took his own life by hanging himself in the woods behind the provincial mental hospital at Essondale.

== Early career ==
Gerussi began acting in high school in New Westminster, British Columbia, when he played the lead in a school production of The Valiant. He won a scholarship to the Banff School of Fine Arts and, after graduating, joined the Seattle Repertory Theatre. In 1949, he returned to Vancouver where he played Stanley Kowalski in Totem Theatre's production of A Streetcar Named Desire and co-starred with Lon Chaney, Jr. in Of Mice and Men.

In 1954, Gerussi joined the Stratford Festival in its second season. During the next few years he went on to act in many stage productions in Canada and the United States, including performing the role of Feste in Twelfth Night, which he later reprised on CBC Television in 1964, and as Romeo opposite Julie Harris in the Stratford Festival's first production of Romeo and Juliet in 1960.

His wife Ida died in 1965. As a single parent raising two children, Gerussi was less able to travel for work and so he joined CHIN radio as its morning man hosting Gerussi, Words and Music for four hours a day from 6 a.m. to 10 a.m. After the show began in January 1967, the Toronto Daily Star's Barbara Frum reported that the show had no listeners for the first two-and-a-half hours of its premiere. The show became popular, however, and in the fall of 1967, CBC Radio gave him a national daily morning show, Gerussi!, which aired until 1971 and became the model for the network's This Country in the Morning and Morningside in the 1970s and 1980s.

== The Beachcombers years ==
Gerussi's best-known role arrived in 1972, when he was signed to play Nick Adonidas in The Beachcombers, a comedy-adventure-drama created by Marc and Susan Strange and set on the west coast of Canada. The Beachcombers ran for 387 episodes between 1972 and 1990 and remains Canada's longest-running weekly dramatic series.

During part of his time with The Beachcombers, Gerussi hosted the CBC cooking program Celebrity Cooks in the late 1970s and most of the 1980s. The series filmed for 12 seasons, with a Monday-to-Friday time slot for most of those years and Gerussi hosted 478 episodes before the show's last season in production, 1987. The Celebrity Cooks episode featured the last public appearance of actor Bob Crane of Hogan's Heroes fame, who was murdered soon afterwards. The taping of Crane's episode was dramatized in the 2002 film Auto Focus, in which actor John Kapelos portrayed Gerussi.

Gerussi's appearances in Celebrity Cooks led him to become commercial spokesperson for a line of microwave ovens in the late-1970s/early-1980s. He appeared in commercials for a variety of food products.

He was the host of the first Genie Awards broadcast in 1980.

== Awards and recognition ==
Gerussi received a Gemini Award nomination for Best Performance by a Lead Actor in a Continuing Dramatic Role in 1990 for the final season of The Beachcombers.

He won the Gemini Earle Grey Award posthumously for lifetime achievement in 1996. His children, Rico and Tina, accepted it on his behalf.

The TV movie The New Beachcombers (2002) was dedicated in his memory. It was the pilot for a new TV series of the same name that aired 2002 to 2004.

== Personal life ==
Gerussi was married to Ida Edith Trento Gerussi. After she died in 1965, he left Stratford and raised their two children, then 13 and 10 years old, as a single parent.

Both of Gerussi's children went on to work in film and television. His daughter, Tina Gerussi, is a casting director. His son, Rico Gerussi, is an assistant director as well as a lead guitarist/vocalist in R&B band The Raging Butanes in Toronto.

Gerussi died at the age of 67 of a heart attack at the home of his companion, Judge Nancy Morrison.

== Filmography ==
- 1953 "Herring Hunt" as
- 1962 Alexander Galt: The Stubborn Idealist (movie) as
- 1962 Twelfth Night (TV) as
- 1966 Seaway (TV), episode 'The wharf rat' as Roger Dean.
- 1967 Do Not Fold, Staple, Spindle or Mutilate (movie) as
- 1972-1990 The Beachcombers (CBC Television dramatic series) as Nick Adonidas
- 1975-1987 Celebrity Cooks (CBC Television 1975-1979 and Global 1980-1987 daytime series and one season in prime time with Global) as host
- 1980 The Newcomers ("1978" episode; limited TV series) as
- 1987 Moving Day (TV movie) as
- 1989 The Raccoons episode "The Phantom of Sneer Mansion" as Edward Miller / The Phantom
- 1991 The Hitman (movie) as Nino Scarlini
- 1995 Prince for a Day (TV movie) as Guido Bitando
- 1995 "Under My Skin" (TV movie) as
