= BC Entertainment Hall of Fame =

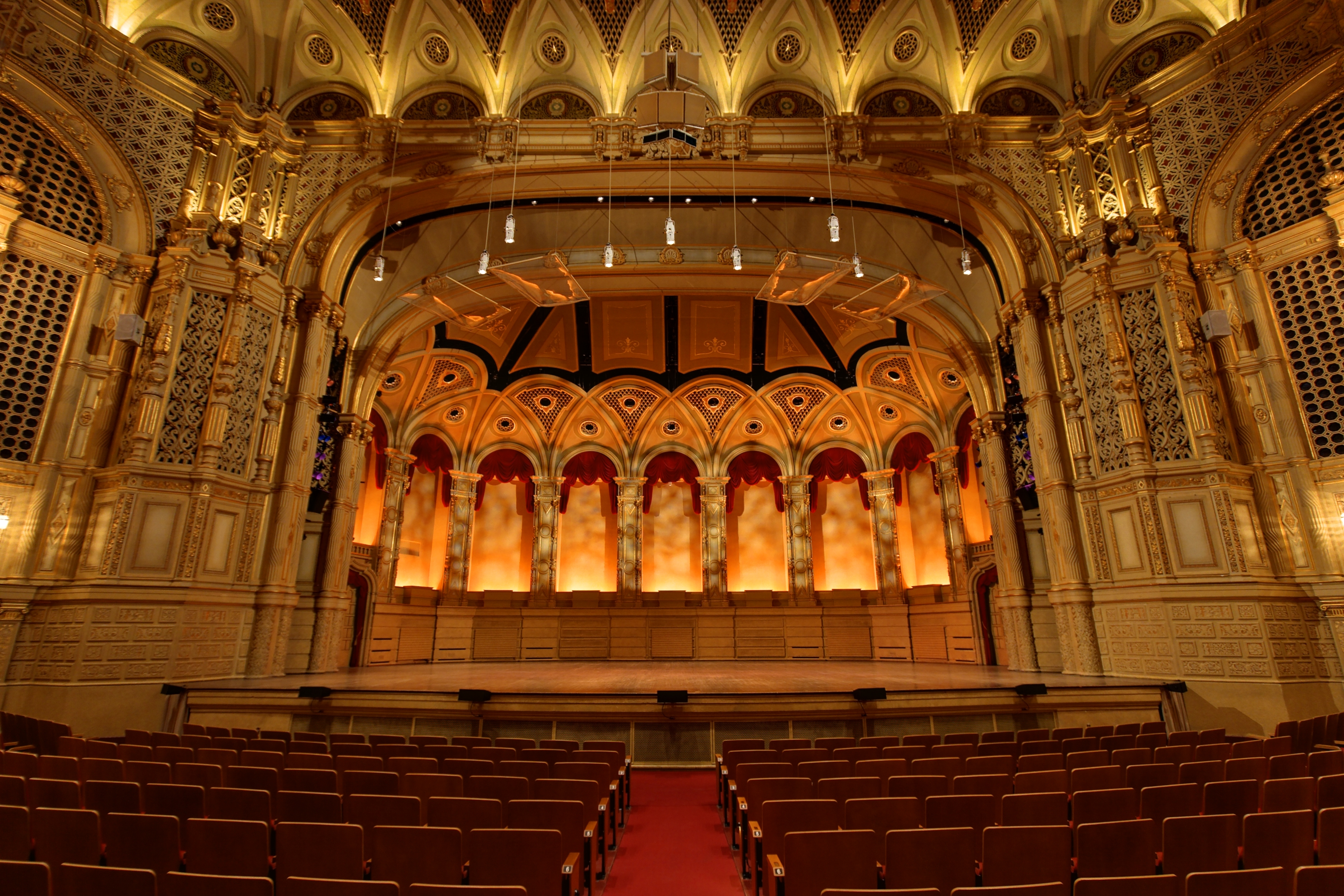
Orpheum in Vancouver

The BC Entertainment Hall of Fame in Vancouver was founded on 24 July 1992 to honour British Columbians that have made outstanding contributions to the entertainment industry. Star Walk inductees are honoured with a brass plaque on Granville Street's Walk of Fame and in a Starwalk gallery in the Orpheum. Individuals and organizations can be nominated and inducted. Vancouver Civic Theatres collaborates with the BC Entertainment Hall of Fame, providing guided tours of the historic Orpheum Theatre.

The selection process can take several years from the time the nomination to when its given. Dorothy Davies was one of the first Star Walk inductees.

== Inductees ==
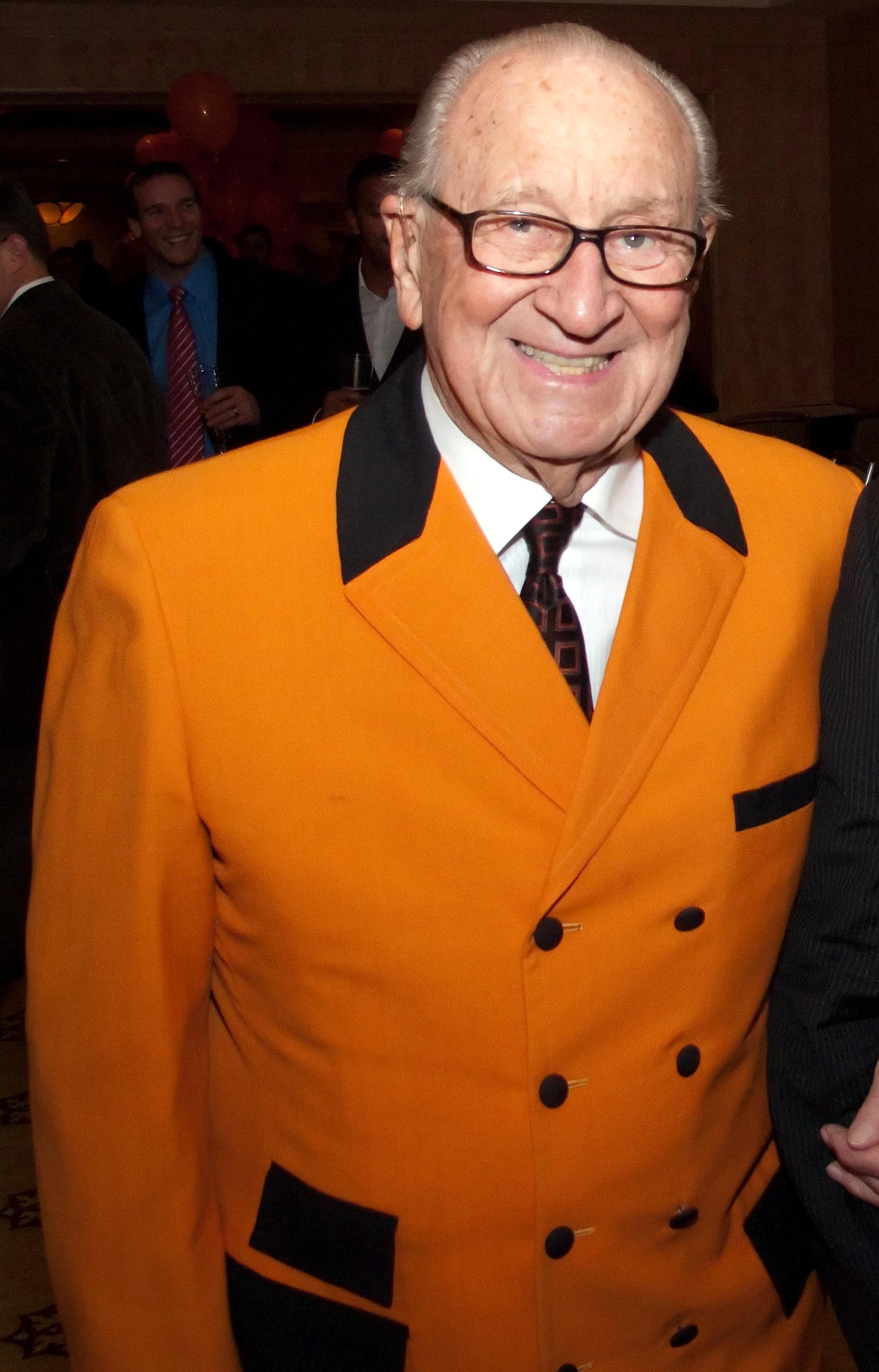
Dal Richards, founding inductee and Star Walk.

- 1992 - Angelina Avison, John Avison, Doris Buckingham
- 1993 - Thora Anders, Thor Arngrim, Shirley Broderick
- 1994 - Dorothy Davies, Leo Aquino, Bob Hope.
- 1995 - Rosemary Deveson, Jack Ammon
- 1996 - Elizabeth Ball, Aida Broadbent
- 1997 - Daryl Duke
- 1998 - Vic Waters and Anna Wyman, Bernard Braden
- 1999 - Gerry and Ron Barre, Charlene Brandolini
- 2000 - Starwalk: Bruce Allen, John Brockington, Drew Burns.
- 2001 - Judith Marcuse, Andrew Allen, Harold Brown.
- 2002 - Christopher Gaze, Dee Daniels, Gillian Campbell, Leon Bibb.
- 2003 - Choo Chiat and Lin Yee Goh, Terry David Mulligan
- 2004 - Double Exposure, Antony Holland, Norma MacMillan, Randy Bachman, Doug Bennett
- 2005 - Kathryn Shaw, John Drainie, Dorwin Baird, Norman Campbell.
- 2006 - David Cooper, Michael Conway Baker, Reid Anderson
- 2007 - Jay Brazeau, Jack Card.
- 2008 - Osmond Borradaile, B.B. King
- 2009 - Michael Bublé, Wendy Gorling, Jann Arden, Nicholas Campbell.
- 2010 - Bruce Greenwood, Bruce Kellett, Bruce Pullan, Susan Jacks, Dave Abbott, Donna Spencer, and Jon Washburn Rae Ackerman, Miles Ramsay.
- 2011 - Kazuyoshi Akiyama, Kay Armstrong & Brent Carver.
- 2012 - Bryan Adams, Nicola Cavendish
- 2013 - Judy Ginn and Jim Walchuk, Bramwell Tovey, Vancouver Symphony Orchestra, Bob Buckley and Ann Watt.
- 2014 - Leonard Schein, Spirit of the West
- 2016 - Starwalk: Michael J. Fox, Marcus Mosely, Hal Beckett, Jazzy B and Joe Keithley Pioneers: George Calangis, Sharmann King, Tom Lavin, Ian McDougall, Linda McRae, Tab Shori, Renee Cherrier, Rai Purdy, Steve Edge, Filippone Brothers, Crawford Hawkins, Diane Loomer, Carole Tarlington
- 2017 - Starwalk: Kirk Shaw, Diane Lines, Gary Fjellgaard, 54-40, Valerie Easton, Roy Forbes, Jerry Wasserman, Pioneers: Isy & Richard Walters and Doug Cox
- 2018 - Doug Cameron, Lloyd Arntzen, Ben Heppner, Nancy Argenta, Todd Kerns, Dan McLeod, Michael Noon, Chin Injeti
- 2019 - Nardwuar The Human Serviette, Colin James, Bob Buckley, Rick Scott, Joani Taylor, Karin Konoval, Moira Walley-Beckett, Emily Molnar
- 2021 - Don Alder, Jim Byrnes.
- 2022 - Mel Warner, R. Paul Dhillon, The Crump Brothers, Paul Shaffer, Walter Daroshin
- 2023 - Starwalk: Nickelback, Loverboy, Rocket Norton, David Foster, Skylark
- Unknown year - Rae Brown

== Founding inductees ==
- Ivan Ackery
- Thora Anders
- Angelina Avison
- John Avison
- Aida Broadbent
- Jan Cherniavsky
- Robert Clothier
- Joy Coghill
- Eleanor Collins
- Ray Collins
- Jack Cullen
- Dorothy Davies
- Arthur Delamont
- Allard de Ridder
- Fran Dowie
- Yvonne Firkins
- Judith Forst
- Bev Fyfe
- Chris Gage
- Bruno Gerussi
- Irving Guttman
- Lance Harrison
- Bill Henderson
- Jeff Hyslop
- Gerald Jarvis
- Juliette
- Evan Kemp
- Mart Kenney
- Harold Laxton
- Lorraine McAllister
- Fraser MacPherson
- Holly Maxwell
- Barney Potts
- Dal Richards
- Jessie Richardson
- Red Robinson
- June Roper
- Dorothy Somerset
- Calvin Winter

== See also ==
- List of halls and walks of fame
- Canada's Walk of Fame
- List of inductees of Canada's Walk of Fame
