= Andrea Peña =

Colombian choreographer and designer

- Born: 1990 (age 35–36); Bogotá, Colombia
- Occupations: Choreographer, Designer
- Years active: 2014 - present
- Known for: Bogotá; 6.58: Manifesto
- Website: www.andreapena.net

Andrea Peña (born 1990) is a Colombian choreographer and designer based in Montreal, Canada. She is the founder and artistic director of Andrea Peña & Artists (AP&A), a multidisciplinary company established in Montreal in 2014.

== Early life and education ==
Peña was born in Bogotá, Colombia, in 1990. She moved to Vancouver in 2002 and started working with Ballet BC in 2009, later moving to Montreal in 2013 to dance with Les Ballets Jazz de Montréal.

At Concordia University, she completed a BFA in Design (2017) and a Master of Design (2023).

== Career ==
Peña founded Andrea Peña & Artists (AP&A) in Montreal in 2014. Her work integrates choreography and design, incorporating structured spatial and material elements into the choreographic work.

In 2018, she received the Clifford E. Lee Choreography Award from the Banff Centre for Arts and Creativity. The same year, Untitled I received the prize for best choreography at the Hong Kong International Choreography Festival.

Peña created 6.58: Manifesto in 2021, which was presented in Montreal and in Ottawa at the National Arts Centre.The work was later showcased at Tanzmesse NRW Düsseldorf, as well as in Sweden and Paris in 2024.. Reviews highlighted its use of repetition and structured movement. 6.58: Manifesto was later turned into a full length film for Theatre Freiburg.

In 2023, Peña presented States of Transmutation at the Mattress Factory Museum, in Pittsburgh, USA which incorporated choreographic and design elements in a robotic installation on display from 2023-2024.

She subsequently created the stage work Uaque, for the National Arts Centre^{,}in Ottawa in collaboration with Canadian photographer Edward Burtynsky and the National Arts Centre Orchestra, led by Orchestra director Alexander Shelly.

Peña later created the stage work Replica, which premiered in September 2024 at the Beruma Cultural Center in Sandvik, Norway, and in 2025, she went on tour to Milan.

In 2022, Peña was selected as the international winner of La Biennale di Venezia's call for new choreographic work by an artist under 35 with the project Bogotá. Bogotá premiered at the 17th International Festival of Contemporary Dance at the Venice Biennale in 2023. It was later presented at the PuSh Festival in Vancouver in January 2025. In October 2025, the work was presented at Sadler's Wells East in London as part of the Dance Umbrella festival. Reviews noted the work’s layered structure, spatial design, and use of ensemble formations..

Peña created commissioned works Sacra for Ballet BC in 2025, through the Emily Molnar Emerging Choreographer Award, as well as Transmuted Symphony for Staatstheater Kassel.

In 2026, Peña was named one of the ten laureates of the CHANEL Next Prize, receiving €100,000.

== Works ==
=== Stage works ===
- Untitled I (2018)
- 6.58: Manifesto (2021)
- Bogotá (2023)
- States of Transmutation (2023)
- Replica (2024)
- Uaque (2024)
- Sacra (2025)
- Transmuted Symphony (2025)
