= Kathryn Shaw =

Canadian actor and director

Kathryn Shaw is a Canadian director, actor, and writer living in Vancouver, British Columbia, Canada. From 1985 to 2020 she was the Artistic Director of Studio 58, an acting and production training school at Langara College.

== History ==
Shaw graduated with a Bachelor of Arts in dramatic art from Whitman College and a Master of Fine Arts in acting from the Columbia University School of the Arts in New York City. Following graduation, she lived in Victoria, British Columbia for a short while before eventually moving to Vancouver.

Over the past few decades, she has directed some of Canada's most prestigious theatre companies. She has taught acting for professional and community groups across British Columbia, Winnipeg, Halifax, and has also been a guest instructor for the National Theatre School in Montreal, Quebec. Shaw has been on the Theatre BC committee, a parent organization to approximately 80 community theatre groups across British Columbia, as an adjudicator and dramaturge.

She began teaching at Studio 58 in 1974 while the school was under the direction of Antony Holland. She taught there for eleven years before replacing Holland as artistic director when he retired in 1985. Under her direction, Studio 58 has become recognized internationally as one of the premiere theatre training programs of Canada. She resigned as Studio 58's artistic director in 2020 and was succeeded by Courtenay Dobbie.

== Select directing credits ==
- Measure for Measure - Bard on the Beach
- Bachelor Brothers On Tour - The Vancouver Playhouse Theatre Company
- The Goat, or Who is Sylvia? - Presentation House Theatre
- Skylight - Belfry Theatre
- The Weir - Belfry Theatre & Western Canada Theatre Company
- Death of a Salesman - Gateway Theatre
- The Glass Menagerie - Gateway Theatre
- The Great Depression - Green Thumb Theatre / Studio 58
- A Midsummer Night's Dream - Studio 58
- Mum's the word - Back Row Productions, Arts Club Theatre Company (creative consultant)

== Honours ==
- In 1996 she received the UBCP/ACTRA Sam Payne Award in recognition of "humanity, integrity and the encouragement of new talent."
- In 2001, she was on the first jury for the Siminovitch Prize in Theatre, which recognized an outstanding director from nominations received from across Canada.
- In 2005 she was elected into the BC Entertainment Hall of Fame.
- The recipient of two Jessie Richardson Theatre Awards for Direction and Best Production, and nominated for four other Jessie Richardson Awards.
- 2009-2010 Association of Canadian Community Colleges (ACCC) Bronze Teaching Excellence Award
- In 2010, she was recognized as one of BC’s 100 most influential women by the Vancouver Sun.
- 2010 recipient of the Greater Vancouver Professional Theatre Alliance (GVPTA) Career Achievement Award
