= Vancouver Playhouse =

Vancouver Playhouse may refer to:

- Vancouver Playhouse (theatre venue), a civic theatre venue in Vancouver, British Columbia, Canada
- Vancouver Playhouse Theatre Company, a theatre company in Vancouver, British Columbia, Canada, producing plays since 1962
