= Queen Elizabeth Theatre =

Coordinates: 49.280355°N 123.112650°W

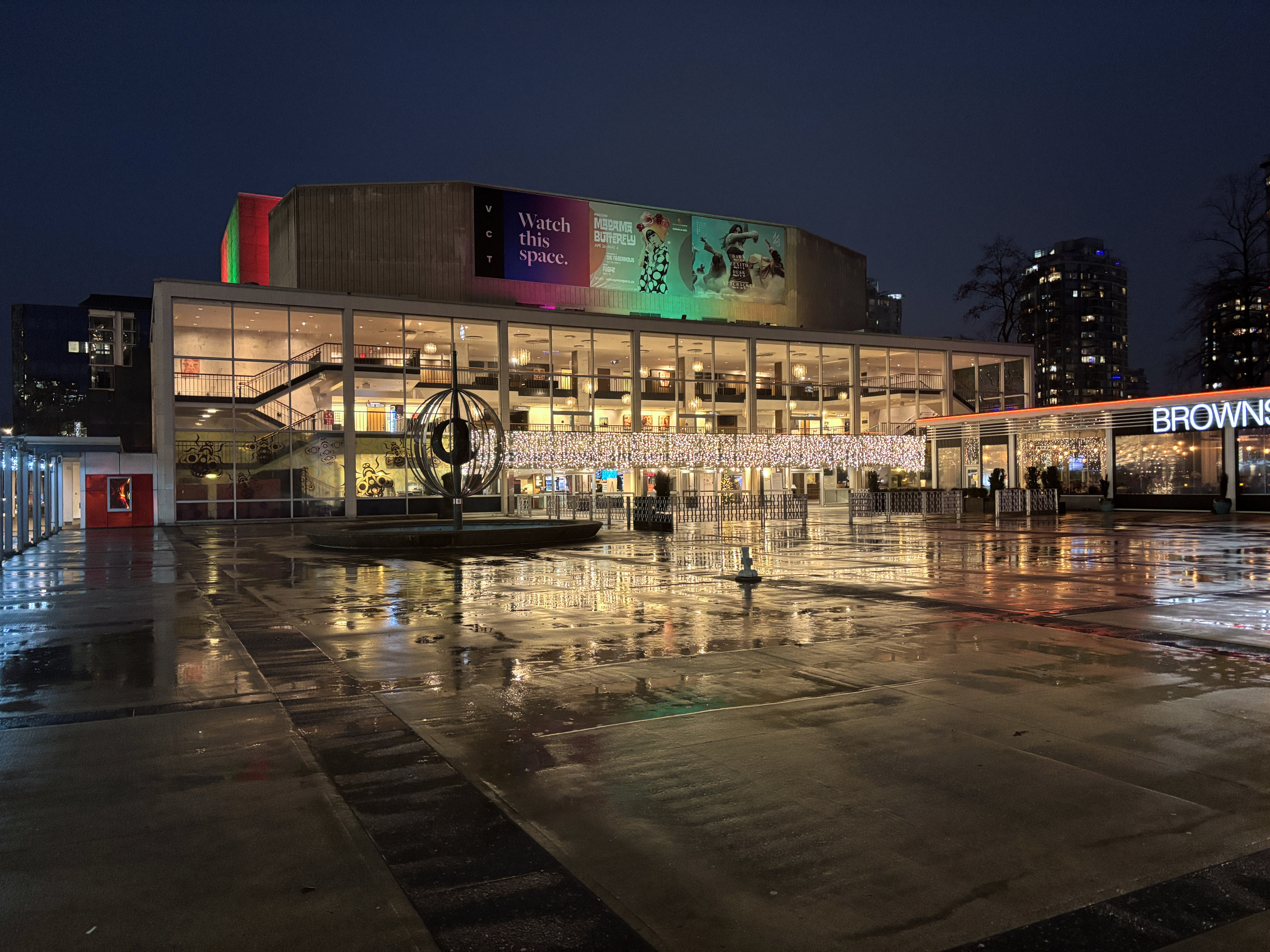

General information
- Location: 630 Hamilton Street, Vancouver, British Columbia
- Groundbreaking: 29 March 1957
- Opened: 5 July 1959

Design and construction
- Architecture firm: Lebensold, Desbarats, Affleck, Dimakopoulos, Michaud, Sise

Other information
- Seating capacity: 2,765

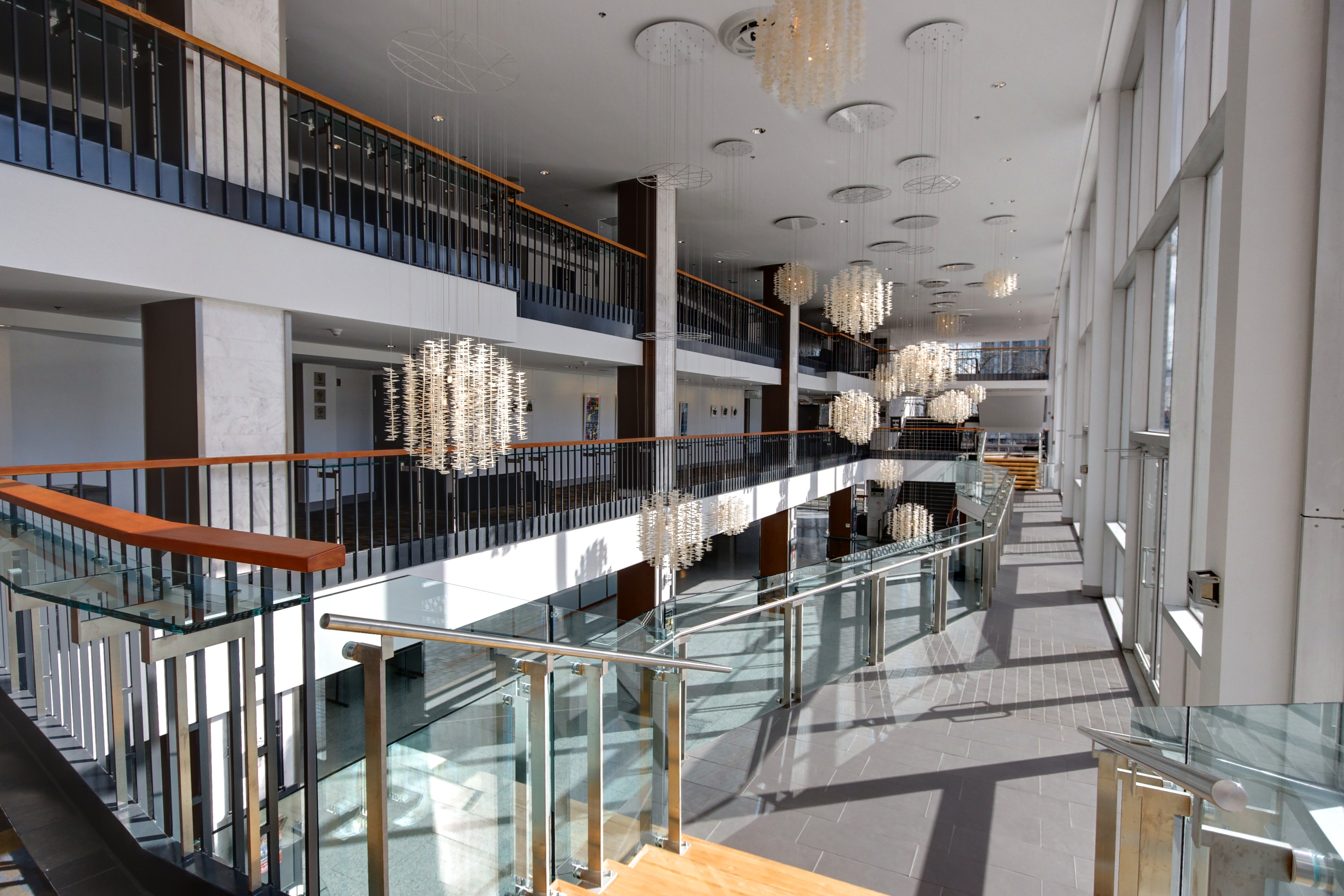
Lobby

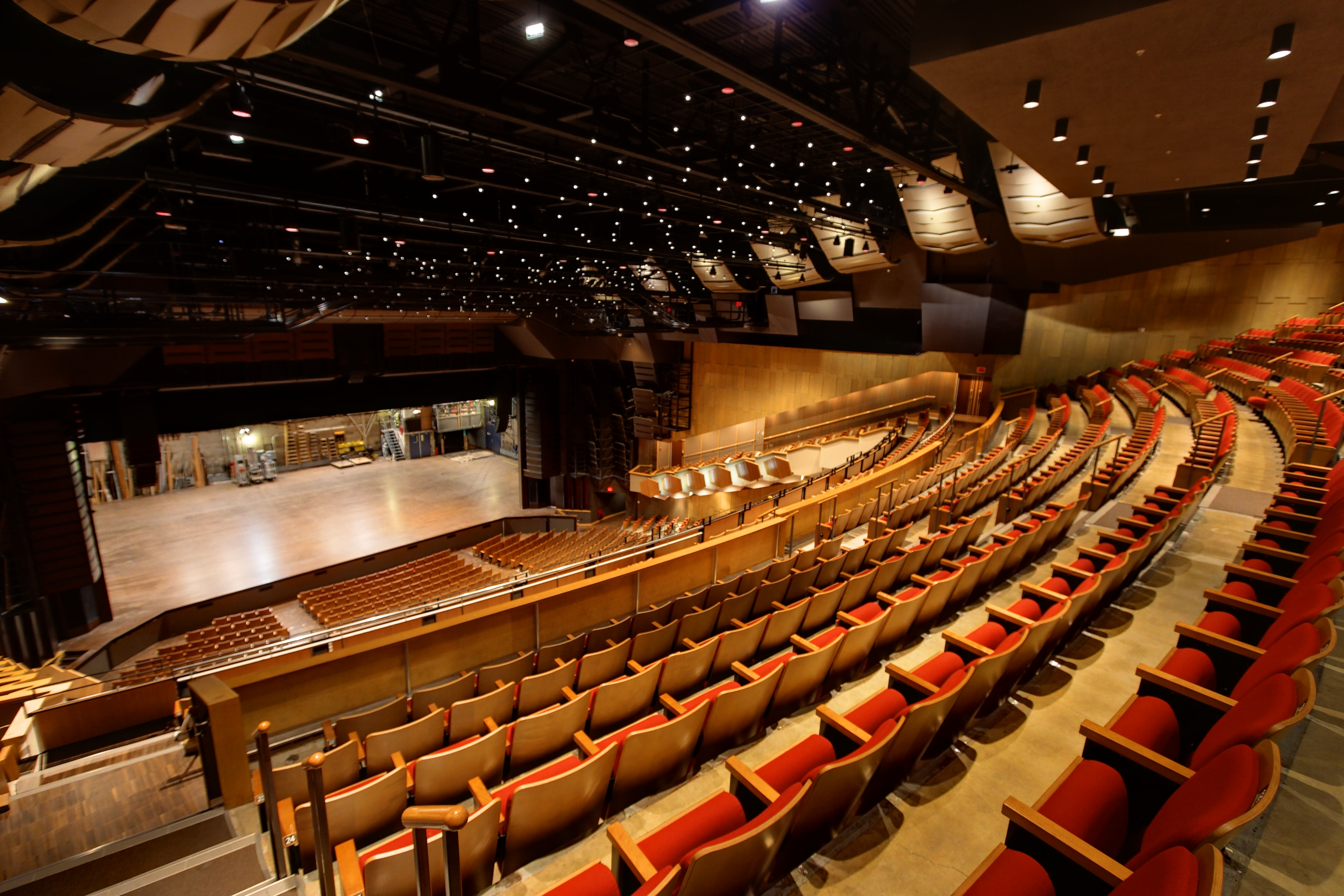
Theatre interior

The Queen Elizabeth Theatre is a performing arts venue in downtown Vancouver, British Columbia, Canada. Along with the Orpheum, Vancouver Playhouse, and the Annex, it is one of four facilities operated by the Vancouver Civic Theatres on behalf of the city of Vancouver (the Playhouse adjoins the QE Theatre in the same complex). It was named after the former Canadian monarch, Queen Elizabeth II.

Formerly the home of the Vancouver Symphony Orchestra, which is now based at the Orpheum, the Queen Elizabeth Theatre is now the home of the Vancouver Opera and Ballet BC. It also hosts various other musical events year-round. The theatre has a 70′ wide x 40′ deep (21.34m x 12.19m) stage / performing area. The building holds two venues: the 2,765-seat main auditorium and the 668-seat Playhouse Theatre.

The theatre was the first project by the Montreal-based architectural partnership of Lebensold, Desbarats, Affleck, Dimakopoulos, Michaud, and Sise. It opened in July 1959.

== See also ==
- Vancouver Playhouse Theatre Company
- Royal eponyms in Canada
