= Carole Tarlington =

Canadian casting director

Carole Tarlington is an Australian and Canadian casting director, author, acting coach, talent agent, and drama consultant who is best known as co-founder of the Vancouver Youth Theatre.

Tarlington was the owner of Tarlington Talent, a talent agency in Vancouver, and Tarlington Training, a youth acting school. She launched the careers of several actors including Ryan Reynolds. Tarlington has created plays with young people that have toured Canada and is a co-author of several textbooks on Drama.

== Early life and education ==
Australian-born, Tarlington first worked in Sydney, with Errol Bray at Shopfront Theatre. Charlotte Harvey talks about her encounter with Tarlington in her book Exploring Social Responsibility through Playbuilding with Middle School Drama Club Students. Tarlington then continued her studies in Canada, getting a BEd and MEd degree at University of Victoria, which enabled her to co-found the Vancouver Youth Theatre in 1983 and become its artistic director.

== Career ==
Tarlington created Tarlington Talent, an agency which represented young stage, film, and television actors. She took many young talents under her wing, many of whom have mentioned her in interviews.

Tarlington developed scripts with youth including Kids’ Rights and Immigrant Children Speak. This program invited students between the ages of 9–18, interested in acting, singing and dancing, to come together in year-long classes to create a musical based on Who Am I written by Chip Fields, concept and music by Erna Maurer and Wise Owl Productions from Los Angeles, California. The show performed at the Vancouver East Cultural Centre with support from Chevron Canada, Bootlegger and the British Columbia Cultural Services Branch of the Ministry of the Provincial Secretary and Government Services.

Tarlington launched Tarlington Training in 1995 as an acting studio for young professional actors. Campuses were in several locations across British Columbia: Vancouver, Surrey and Maple Ridge. Notable students include stunt performer and actress Katie Stuart and Helstrom's Trevor Roberts. Actors Richard Ian Cox and Cameron Bancroft taught alongside Tarlington. Later on, Tarlington entrusted the general management of the studio to Peter Grasso.

Tarlington released a book I Wanna Be An Actor, in which she wrote practical advice for child and teen actors as well as their parents.

== Awards and honours ==
- Inductee of the BC Entertainment Hall of Fame in Vancouver.

== Personal life ==
Tarlington lives with her partner, Wendy Grant. She is a donor for The Cultch, Vancouver's cultural hub, which curates unique and diverse performances.

== Filmography ==
=== Film ===
Year	Title	Role	Notes
1986	Differences	Casting director	Short film
1999	The Lonely Passion of Petar the Pig Farmer	Casting director	Short film
1999	The Fare	Casting director	Short film
1999	Better Than Chocolate	Casting Department in Vancouver	
2000	Protection	Addition casting crew	
2001	After	Casting director	
2001	Mile Zero	Casting director	
2001	The Rhino Brothers	Casting director	
2002	Zero Tolerance	Casting director	Short film
2002	Tribe of Joseph	Casting director	
2003	Why the Anderson Children Didn't Come to Dinner	Casting director	Short film
2004	Beachbound	Casting director	
2006	The Saddest Boy in the World	Casting director	Short film
2016	Obsession	Producer	

=== Television ===
Year	Title	Role	Notes
1999–2003	Cold Squad	Casting Department in Vancouver, Casting Director	
2001	The Unprofessionals	Casting director	
2001	Salmon Chanted Evening	Casting director	Short film
2001	ICE: Beyond Cool	Casting director	
2001–2005	Edgemont	Casting director	
2002	Jinnah – On Crime: Pizza 911	Casting director	
2002	The Telescope	Casting director	Short film
2002	Saint Monica	Casting director	
2002	Society's Child	Casting director	
2003	Jinnah: On Crime – White Knight, Black Widow	Casting director	
2004	Renegadepress.com	Casting director	
2015	The Green Shoes	Producer	Short film
2015	Charlie's Secret	Executive Producer	Short film
2015	Blackout	Producer	Short film

== Publications ==
- Tarlington, Carole; Verriour, Patrick (1983). Offstage: Elementary Education Through Drama. Oxford University Press. ISBN 0195404084.
- Verriour, Patrick; Tarlington, Carole (1984). Drama for Understanding: Teaching Social Studies through Role Drama.
- Early, Margaret; Tarlington, Carole. Offstage: Informal Drama in Language Learning.
- Tarlington, Carole (1985). ""Dear Mr. Piper...": Using Drama to Create Context for Children's Writing". Theory into Practice. 24 (3): 199–204. ISSN 0040-5841.
- Tarlington, Carole; Verriour, Patrick (1991). Role Drama.
- Tarlington, Carole (1771-01-01). Building Plays by Carole Tarlington. Heinemann Drama. ISBN 1551380536.
- Tarlington, Carole. So You Wanna Be An Actor.
