= Points East, Points West =

- Genre: Variety
- Country of origin: Canada
- Original language: English
- No. of seasons: 1

Production
- Running time: 30 minutes

Original release
- Network: CBC Television
- Release: 27 May – 14 October 1976

Points East, Points West is a Canadian musical variety show that aired on CBC Television in 1976.

== Premise ==
This program featured regionally-produced entertainment specials which were intended as pilots for new series.

Montreal: "Mission Moreau Possible" featured comedian and impressionist Jean-Guy Moreau leading a series of comedy and musical segments. Pat Cook produced these episodes.

Edmonton: Separate specials were developed for musicians Gabrielle Bujeaud (Bernard Picard, producer) and Nancy Nash (Don McRae, producer).

Halifax: These were produced by Ralph Waugh and starred local artists. This was the pilot for the 1977 series That Maritime Feelin'.

St. John's: Beth Harrington and David Michael were featured in these Newfoundland programmes, with Kevin O'Connell as producer.

Vancouver: Musicians and siblings Judy Ginn and Jim Walchuk, previously featured in a three-week 1973 CBC miniseries, starred in these programmes which were produced by Mike Watt. This led to the 1977 mid-year replacement program , The Judy and Jim Show.

== Scheduling ==
This half-hour program was broadcast on Thursdays at 9:30 p.m. (Eastern) from 27 May to 14 October 1976.
