= David Y. H. Lui =

- Born: September 28, 1944; Vancouver, British Columbia
- Died: September 15, 2011 (aged 66); Vancouver, British Columbia
- Education: University of British Columbia

Chinese name
- Chinese: 雷元熙
- Hanyu Pinyin: Léi Yuánxī
- Yale Romanization: Lèuih Yùhn-hēi

David Y. H. Lui (CM) (September 28, 1944 – September 15, 2011) was a prominent Canadian arts impresario and producer, highly respected for constructing the arts infrastructure in Vancouver.

== Biography ==
Of Chinese heritage, Lui was born in Vancouver, British Columbia, and attended Kitsilano Secondary School and the University of British Columbia. Lui was an important cornerstone at the forefront of Vancouver's cultural scene. A crucial member of the city's art community for more than 40 years, he helped found the Ballet of British Columbia.

== Boards and memberships ==
Organisations connected with Lui include:

- Ballet British Columbia
- Cultural Program Developer and Member at the Canadian International Dragon Boat Festival
- Dance Foundation – Developer of the Scotiabank Dance Centre
- Canada Council for the Arts
- British Columbia Arts Council

== Personal life ==
Lui died in Vancouver from complications of congenital heart failure. He was survived by his brother, Philip, and his sister-in-law Ping.

== Awards ==
- Member of the Order of Canada for service in the arts
- Recipient of gold and silver Queen Elizabeth Jubilee medal (1992)
