= The Judy and Jim Show =

- Presented by: Judy Ginn; Jim Walchuk
- Country of origin: Canada
- Original language: English
- No. of seasons: 2 (1973, 1977 only)
- No. of episodes: 10

Production
- Producers: Bill White (1973); Michael Watt (1977)
- Production location: Vancouver

Original release
- Network: CBC Television
- Release: 6 August 1973 – 16 September 1977

The Judy and Jim Show is a Canadian variety television show that aired on CBC Television as separate runs in 1973 and 1977.

== Premise ==
This Vancouver-produced program featured sibling vocalists Judy Ginn and Jim Walchuk, leading a mix of comedy and music material with an emphasis on Ukrainian culture. Its 1973 run was three episodes, part of a block of mid-season variety programming originating from various Canadian cities. Bobby Hales was the program's music director and house band leader, supported by musical trio Pat Hervey, Joani Taylor and Michael Vincent.

A second run of seven episodes was broadcast in 1977, also produced in Vancouver. Juliette appeared on 9 September 1977 broadcast with the Cheremshyna Ukrainian Dancers.

== Scheduling ==
The first half-hour miniseries was broadcast on Mondays at 7:30 p.m. (Eastern time) from 6 to 20 August 1973.

The second series was broadcast Fridays at 7:30 p.m. from 29 July to 16 September 1977, also a half-hour timeslot, totalling seven episodes (19 August 1977 time slot was pre-empted for a Canada Games report).

== See also ==
- Points East, Points West (1976, in which Ginn and Walchuk performed)
