= Vancouver Playhouse Theatre Company =

- Formation: 1962
- Type: Theatre group
- Location: Vancouver, British Columbia, Canada
- Artistic director: Max Reimer
- Website: vancouverplayhouse.com

The Vancouver Playhouse Theatre Company ("The Playhouse") was a regional theatre company, producing plays since 1962. Its first production was The Hostage by Brendan Behan, which opened on October 2, 1963. The company performed out of the Vancouver Playhouse, a civic theatre in Vancouver’s downtown core (at Hamilton and Dunsmuir), which is also home to the Vancouver Recital Society and the Friends of Chamber Music. Citing financial difficulties, the company announced that it would cease operations on March 10, 2012

== Company activities ==
At the time of its closure, The Playhouse was presenting a five-play "Mainstage" season that ran October through May, smaller-scale productions and play readings at alternate venues, and special productions for young audiences. Productions generally ran for three to four weeks, with some matinees for students, seniors, and the disadvantaged. Some productions were preceded by guest speakers, known as "Salon Saturdays", with others followed by moderated "talkbacks" . The Playhouse also had an education and outreach program. The company often partnered with the Studio 58 theatre and production program to apprentice students and graduates.

== Funding ==
A major fundraiser for the company was the Vancouver Playhouse International Wine Festival, which was first produced as a single-winery event in 1979.

In 2011, following in-camera deliberations by the Vancouver City Council, Vancouver provided the company with a complex bailout of approximately $1 million. The information regarding the bailout was the result of a leak from Vancouver city hall, following which the city posted the relevant documents on-line. In response to negative reaction, artistic director Max Reimer defended the city's action on the Playhouse's website.

== Artistic Directors ==
The company had many prominent Canadian directors serve as Artistic Directors over the years including Christopher Newton, Joy Coghill and Walter Learning. The Artistic Managing Director at the time of the company's closure was Max Reimer, who joined the Playhouse in July 2008. The following individuals served as Artistic Director:

- Max Reimer (2008–2012)
- Glynis Leyshon (1997-2008)
- Susan Cox (1993-1997)
- Larry Lillo (1988-1992)
- Guy Sprung (1987-1988)
- Walter Learning (1982-1987)
- Roger Hodgman (1979-1981)
- Christopher Newton (1973-1979)
- Paxton Whitehead (1971-1973)
- David Gardner (1969-1971)
- Joy Coghill (1967-1969)
- Malcolm Black (1964-1967)
- Michael Johnston (1963-1964)
