= Vancouver Recital Society =

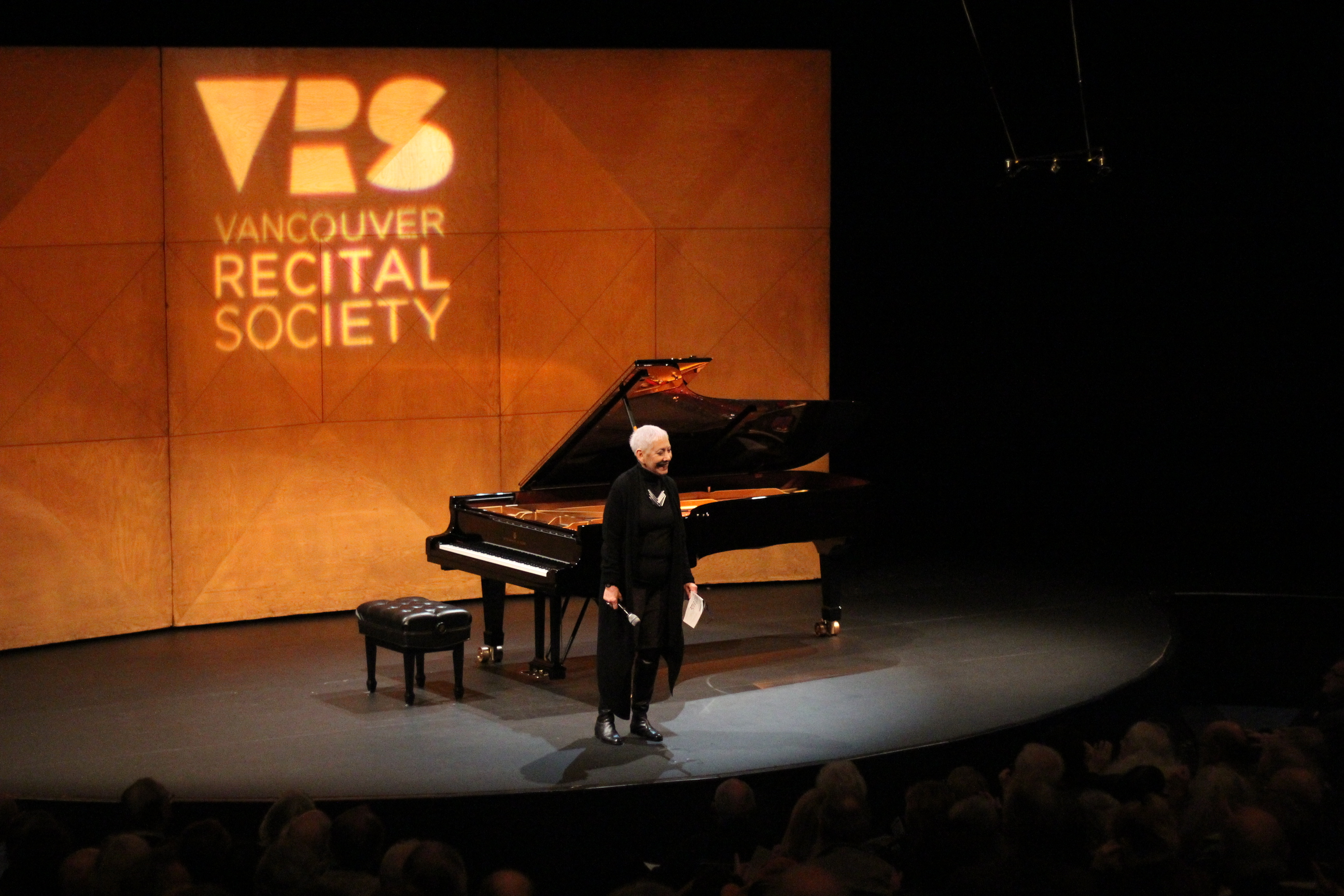
Leila Getz, founder and artistic director of the Vancouver Recital Society

The Vancouver Recital Society is one of Vancouver’s major presenters of classical and chamber music, offering a platform for fans to see new and established high-profile performers. Concerts have taken place in the Orpheum Theatre, the Chan Centre for the Performing Arts, the Kay Meek Centre and the Vancouver Playhouse.

Leila Getz created the organization in 1980. Its first season had a budget of $10,000. By the 2010s, its annual revenue had grown to $1.4 million.

The Vancouver Recital Society presented in their Canadian and/or Vancouver recital debuts Lang Lang, Cecilia Bartoli, Maxim Vengerov, Anne Sofie von Otter, Yo-Yo Ma, András Schiff, Joshua Bell, Steven Isserlis, Bryn Terfel, and Canadian musicians including Angela Cheng, Scott St. John, James Ehnes, Richard Raymond and Jon Kimura Parker.

In recognition of her work to found and grow the society, Getz was inducted into the Order of Canada and the Order of British Columbia. She received the Golden Jubilee Medal in 2002 and was named as a Professional of the Year by Musical America.

The Vancouver Recital Society attracted criticism in 2022 for using Russian ethnicity as a basis for whether or not it would require statements of solidarity with Ukraine from its performers. Pianist Alexander Malofeev, who has relatives in Russia and Ukraine, made a statement which condemned the war but did not fulfil other requirements. Getz pointed instead to the possibility of a confrontation with protesters as the primary reason for cancelling Malofeev's concert.
