= Juliette (Canadian singer) =

Canadian singer and television host (1926-2017)

- Born: Juliette Augustina Sysak; 27 August 1926; St. Vital, Manitoba, Canada
- Died: 26 October 2017 (aged 91); Vancouver, British Columbia, Canada
- Occupation: Singer
- Spouse: Tony Ivo Cavazzi (7 July 1948 – 8 January 1988; his death)

Juliette Augustina Cavazzi, CM (née Sysak; 27 August 1926 – 26 October 2017), nicknamed "Our pet", was a Canadian singer and television host who was featured on CBC Television from the 1950s through the 1970s.

== Biography ==
The daughter of Polish-Ukrainian immigrants, Juliette Augustina Sysak was born in St. Vital, Manitoba. She moved with her family to Vancouver in her youth, where she began her singing career in 1940. She was professionally known by simply her first name, Juliette, starting with her appearances with the Dal Richards band at the Hotel Vancouver at age 13.

Juliette Cavazzi married her manager, singer Tony Ivo Cavazzi on 7 July 1948. They remained married for 40 years until his death in 1988. She retired and lived in Vancouver, although she made occasional special appearances, such as an event marking the 85th birthday of bandleader Dal Richards in 2004.

She died in Vancouver, British Columbia, on 26 October 2017, at the age of 91.

== Awards and honours ==
- 1975: appointed Member of the Order of Canada
- 1994: inducted into BC Entertainment Hall of Fame
- 1999: inducted into Canada's Walk of Fame
- In February 1955, she was selected as Queen of the Saranac Lake, New York winter carnival.

== Filmography ==
- 1956–1966: Juliette (CBC Television series)
- 1973–1975: Juliette and Friends (CBC Television series)
- 8 September 2002: Life and Times biography (CBC Television)

== Discography ==
- 1968: Juliette
- 1968: Juliette's Christmas World
- 1969: Juliette's Country World
