= Christopher Newton =

British-Canadian actor (1936–2021)

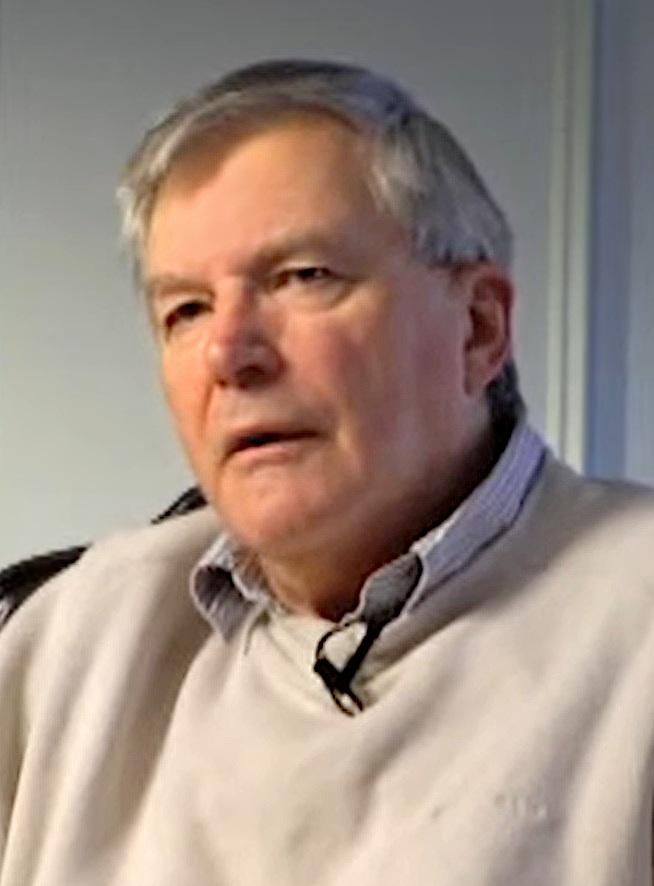
Newton in 2007

Christopher Newton OC (11 June 1936 – 20 December 2021) was a Canadian director and actor, who served as artistic director of the Shaw Festival from 1980 to 2002.

== Early life and education ==
Newton was born in Deal, Kent, England and educated at Sir Roger Manwood's School. After graduating from the University of Leeds with a B.A., he moved to the United States for further study at Purdue University in Indiana and the University of Illinois, where he earned his M.A. in 1960.

Summer jobs at the Vancouver Festival in 1959, and the Oregon Shakespeare Festival, the next two summers, led Newton into acting. Bucknell University hired him as acting head of theatre department, where he continued to learn acting on the job.

== Career ==
Newton performed with the Canadian Players, at the Manitoba Theatre Centre, the Vancouver Playhouse and the Stratford Festival. At Stratford, he played such roles as 'Oberon' in A Midsummer Night's Dream and 'Aramis' in The Three Musketeers. He also appeared on Broadway in Peter Shaffer's The Private Ear.

In 1968, Newton founded Theatre Calgary where he served as artistic director until 1971. In 1973, he was appointed artistic director of the Vancouver Playhouse Theatre Company. There, he founded the Playhouse Acting School with his friend and mentor Powys Thomas.

== Shaw Festival ==
In 1979, after thrice refusing, Newton accepted an appointment as artistic director of the Shaw Festival. During his tenure, Newton continued the work to expand and enrich the Shaw Festival repertory company.

Newton directed a number of critically acclaimed productions, including George Bernard Shaw's Caesar and Cleopatra (1983), Heartbreak House (1985), Major Barbara (1987), Man and Superman (1989), Misalliance (1990), Pygmalion (1992), Candida (1993) and You Never Can Tell (1995), as well as Henry Arthur Jones's The Silver King, William Gillette's Sherlock Holmes, Harold Brighouse's Hobson's Choice, Oscar Wilde's Lady Windermere's Fan, J.M. Barrie's Peter Pan, St. John Hankin's The Return of the Prodigal, and Noël Coward's Cavalcade. He also continued to appear as an actor at The Shaw, taking a series of small roles in one of the company's greatest successes, Derek Goldby's production of Edmond Rostand's Cyrano de Bergerac, as well as playing lead roles in Noël Coward's Private Lives and Granville Barker's The Secret Life.

As artistic director, he brought in directors such as Tadeusz Bradecki, Derek Goldby, Denise Coffey, Jackie Maxwell and Neil Munro. Newton also carefully developed the acting company, cultivating talented younger actors with challenging roles and effectively turning company members Jim Mezon, Heath Lamberts, and Fiona Reid into stars. Newton also widened the mandate of the Shaw Festival (the performance of plays written and set in Bernard Shaw's lifetime, 1856–1950) by programming the works of lesser known playwrights such as Granville Barker, whose entire oeuvre was performed at the Shaw Festival in a series of highly praised productions directed by Neil Munro.

Newton's final season as artistic director of the Shaw was in 2002, and he invited Jackie Maxwell to join him for the season as artistic director designate to ensure a careful transition of leadership. Since his departure, he worked as a freelance director and actor for companies such as the Canadian Opera Company, the Vancouver Playhouse, Theatre Calgary, and the Stratford Festival. He also returned to the Shaw Festival in 2004 to direct Oscar Wilde's The Importance of Being Earnest and in 2005 to direct R. C. Sherriff's Journey's End.

== Honours ==
Newton was appointed a Member of the Order of Canada in 1995. He was named an Officer in 2018. Christopher Newton's other awards include the Governor General's Performing Arts Award, Canada's highest honour in the performing arts (2000), the Molson Prize; and, from the United States Institute for Theatre Technology (USITT), the Thomas DeGaetani Award, all honouring his lifetime contribution to the theatre.

== Personal life and death ==
Newton died on 20 December 2021, at the age of 85.
