= Jonathan Lachlan-Stewart =

Canadian actor

Jonathan Lachlan Stewart
- Born: Edmonton, Alberta, Canada
- Education: Studio 58
- Occupations: Actor, Voice actor and Playwright

Jonathan Lachlan Stewart is a Canadian actor and playwright.

Stewart was born and educated in Edmonton, Alberta, and began writing plays in elementary school, when he was twelve years old. Some were performed at the Edmonton International Fringe Festival. Later, he studied theatre at Studio 58, in Vancouver, British Columbia. In 2004, he co-founded a theatre company, Surreal SoReal, with Vincent Forcier, which tours the country with original plays.

Stewart's play writing credits include Little Room (nominated for two Edmonton Sterling Awards), Grumplestock's (co-written and published in the NextFest anthology), Twisted Thing (honorable mention, Larry Corse world-wide playwriting contest), Eleanor, and The City Green. He has been nominated for a Jessie Award for his acting in Vancouver theatre.

Stewart also works as a voice actor with the Calgary-based Blue Water Studios, to voice Kamille Bidan in the English dub of Mobile Suit Zeta Gundam. He was also the voice of Kamille in most of the Gundam games that Kamille appeared in until the Dynasty Warriors Gundam series. Currently he is providing the voice of Miwa for the first season of the English adaptation of the Cardfight!! Vanguard.
