= Studio 58 =

Theatre school in Vancouver, British Columbia

- Former names: Arts program, Vancouver City College (1965 - 1970)
- Type: Public
- Established: 1965
- Affiliations: ACCC
- Artistic Director: Paul Moniz de Sá
- Faculty: 18
- Administrative staff: 5
- Students: Approx. 75
- Location: Vancouver, British Columbia, Canada; 49°13′30″N 123°6′30″W
- Campus: Vancouver (Urban)
- Colours: Black; White
- Nickname: Studio
- Website: https://langara.ca/studio-58

Studio 58 is the professional theatre training school at Langara College in Vancouver, British Columbia. The school offers a three-year diploma program for acting students and a three-year diploma program for production students. It is regarded as one of the top theatre schools in Canada and the only conservatory-style theatre training program in Western Canada.

The school auditions hundreds of people across Canada with sixteen accepted per semester (there are intakes in both fall and spring). Studio 58 operates a small theatre and presents 4 full-length productions annually as well as a smaller presentation of a student devised show, called Risky Nights. Professional directors and designers are hired to work on each production, and occasionally guest performing artists. Studio 58 productions are open to the public and reviewed by the Vancouver media.

== History ==
The school was founded in 1965 as a small theatre arts course first held on the King Edward Campus of Vancouver City College, now Vancouver Community College. Led by Antony Holland, the course grew into a full program. In 1970 the program moved to new facilities on the Langara Campus and became known as Studio 58, named after the room number of the original theatre space.

In 1985 Holland left and was replaced as Artistic Director by Kathryn Shaw, who retired in 2020 and was replaced by Courtenay Dobbie, who died in 2024 and was replaced by Interim Co-Artistic Directors Raes Calvert and Shizuka Kai.Shizuka Kai was replaced by Interim Co-Artistic Director Stephanie Elgersma. Paul Moniz de Sá was then named as the school's permanent Artistic Director.

Studio 58's 2015/2016 season celebrated their 50th anniversary.

== Notable staff ==
- Aaron Bushkowsky - Playwriting
- Andrew McNee - Acting
- Kathryn Shaw - Former Artistic Director; Acting

== Notable alumni ==
* Alex Lazaridis Ferguson - Actor, director, artistic director, author
- Scott Bellis - Actor, director
- Mark Acheson - Actor, TV, film and voiceover
- Brian Drummond - Actor
- Bob Frazer - Actor
- Carmen Aguirre - Actor, director, writer
- Lara Gilchrist - Actress
- Kevin Kerr - Playwright
- Christopher Heyerdahl - Actor
- Jonathan Lachlan-Stewart - Actor
- Kevin Loring - Actor, playwright
- John Mann - Actor, musician
- Kevin McNulty - Actor
- Scott McNeil - Actor
- Colin Mochrie - Actor, Whose Line Is It Anyway?
- Ty Olsson - Actor
- David Richmond-Peck - Actor
- Craig Veroni - Actor
- Jonathon Young - Actor
- Daniel Doheny - Actor
- Josh Epstein - Actor, Producer, Writer
- Juno Rinaldi - Actor
- Sonja Bennett - Actor, writer
- Jane Perry - Actor
