= Dal Richards =

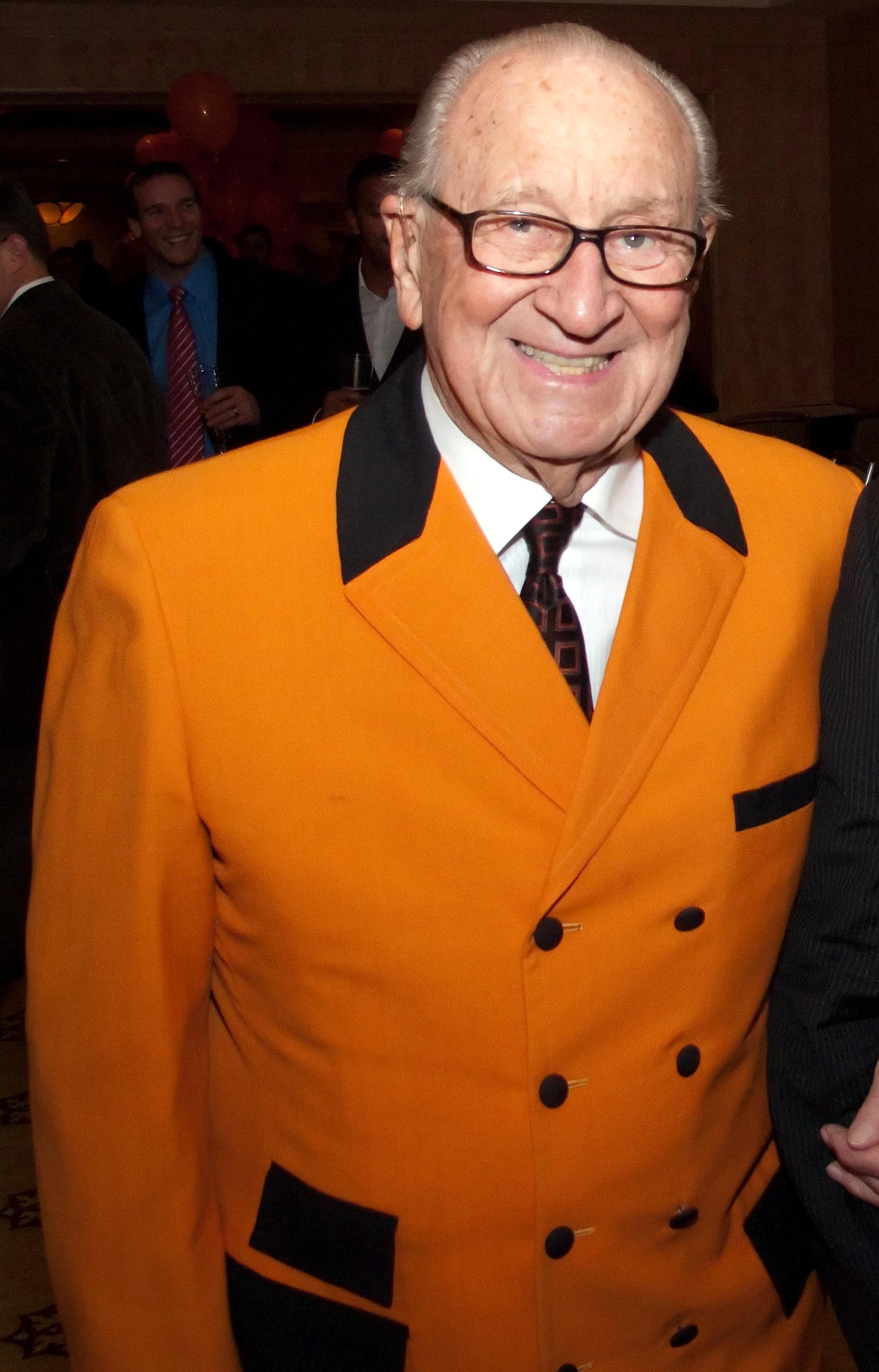
- Richards in March 2009

Background information
- Born: Dallas Murray Richards; 5 January 1918; Vancouver, British Columbia, Canada
- Died: 31 December 2015 (aged 97) Vancouver, British Columbia, Canada
- Genres: Swing
- Occupation(s): Conductor, bandleader, musician
- Instrument(s): Saxophone, clarinet
- Years active: 1940–2015

Dallas Murray Richards, CM, OBC (5 January 1918 – 31 December 2015) was a Canadian big band leader.

Richards and his band performed in the Lower Mainland, at PNE bandstand and the annual New Year celebration at the Bayshore Hotel. The band played 79 consecutive New Year's Eve concerts until his death on 31 December 2015.

Richards led his band for many years in a weekly CBC Radio show broadcast nationally from the Panorama Roof Ballroom of the Hotel Vancouver. He hosted a weekly one-hour show on radio station CISL.

Richards was commonly thought to be the lyricist of "Roar You Lions Roar", the fight song of the BC Lions football club set to the music of "I Love the Sunshine of Your Smile". However, Peggy Miller of CJCA, an Edmonton radio station, wrote the lyrics in 1953, and Richards arranged and popularized the song with his band's performance at games. His 1968 album CFL Songs popularized "Roar You Lions Roar", "Go Argos Go", "On Roughriders" and many other songs still heard to this day in CFL stadiums.

A documentary film on Dal was produced for Bravo and The National Film Board of Canada in 1997. BIG BAND BOOM! was produced and directed by Mark Glover Masterson and was nominated for a Hot Docs International Documentary Award in 1998 and ultimately won Best Arts Documentary at the U.S. International Film and Video Festival in Chicago in '98.

== Awards and honours ==
- 1994: Order of Canada, Member
- 1994: First inductee into the BC Entertainment Hall of Fame
