= Ballet BC =

Contemporary ballet company in Vancouver, Canada

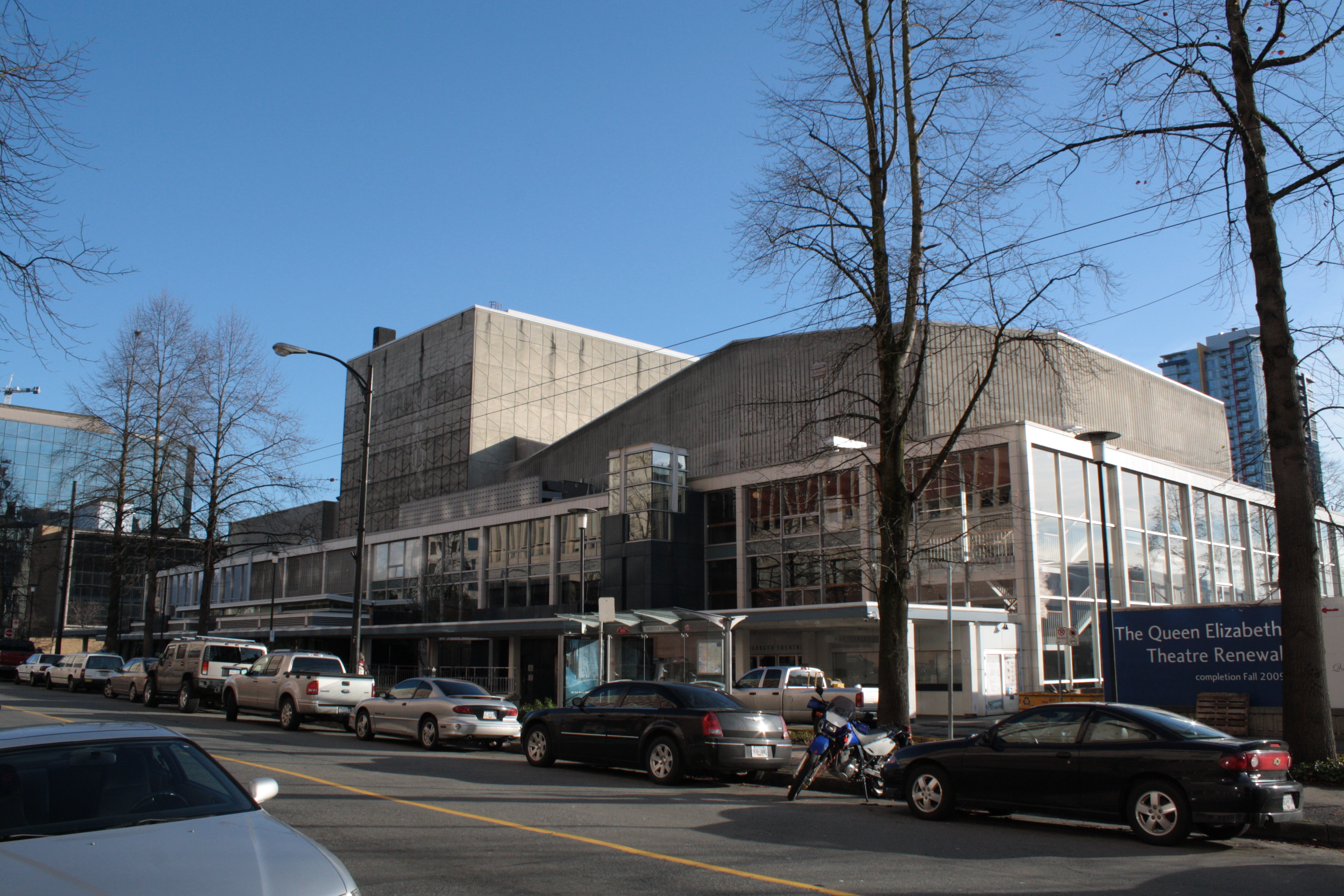
- The Queen Elizabeth Theatre, home of Ballet BC

General information
- Name: Ballet BC
- Previous names: Ballet British Columbia
- Predecessor: Pacific Ballet Theatre; Ballet Horizons
- Year founded: 1986
- Founders: Jean Orr; David Y. H. Lui; Sheila Begg
- Artistic Director: Medhi Walerski (2020–Present); Emily Molnar (2009–2020); John Alleyne (1992–2009); Marquita Lester (1992); Barry Ingham (1990–92); Patricia Neary (1989–90); Reid Anderson (1987–89); Annette av Paul (1986–87)
- Location: Vancouver, BC
- Principal venue: Queen Elizabeth Theatre
- Website: balletbc.com

Senior staff
- Chief executive: John Clark; Branislav Henselmann (2012–2017); Jay Rankin (2009–2012); Susan K. E. Howard (2006–2009); Jennifer Johnstone (2004–2006); Kevin Myers (2000–2004); Tricia Baldwin (1997–2000); Howard R. Jang (1993–1997); David Y. H. Lui (1992–1993); Robert J. McGifford (1987–1992); Ken Peirson (1986)

Artistic staff
- Artistic director: Medhi Walerski

Ballet BC is a contemporary ballet company located in Vancouver, British Columbia.

== History ==
Ballet BC is a professional contemporary ballet company based in Vancouver, British Columbia, Canada. The company was founded as Ballet British Columbia by Jean Orr, David Y. H. Lui and Sheila Begg in 1986, with Annette av Paul as first Artistic Director.

Artistic direction passed to Reid Anderson, Patricia Neary and Barry Ingham and in 1992 to John Alleyne, who introduced a program with original choreography including his The Faerie Queen in 2000 and dances by other Canadian choreographers. Alleyne was followed by Emily Molnar after the reorganization in 2009. Molnar was followed by Medhi Walerski in 2020.

As of April 2015, the company is the only professional ballet company in British Columbia. Its home performances take place at the Queen Elizabeth Theatre.

In 2023, Ballet BC moved into their own facility for the first time, at Granville Island.

In 2026, Ballet BC announced that Bobbi Jene Smith and Or Schraiber had been appointed resident choreographers.

== Repertoire ==
Ballet BC presents a repertoire of contemporary ballet.

The company opened the 2015 Jacob's Pillow Dance Festival, presenting three dances each by a different choreographer, including Twenty Eight Thousand Waves by their own resident choreographer Cayetano Soto. The company travelled on their 30th anniversary tour in late 2015 and 2016.
