= That Maritime Feelin' =

- Genre: Variety
- Presented by: Marg Osburne
- Country of origin: Canada
- Original language: English
- No. of seasons: 1

Production
- Producer: Jack O'Neil
- Production location: Halifax

Original release
- Network: CBC Television
- Release: 8 April – 15 July 1977

That Maritime Feelin' is a Canadian music variety show that aired on CBC Television in 1977.

== Premise ==
Marg Osburne (Don Messer's Jubilee) hosted this Halifax-produced series which featured Atlantic Canadian musicians and a studio audience. It was produced by Jack O'Neil (The Sunshine Hour).

Guests included Jim Bennet, John Allan Cameron, Wilf Carter, Stompin' Tom Connors, Shirley Eikhard, Patsy Gallant, Noel Harrison, Catherine McKinnon, Gene McLellan, Kenzie McNeil, Anne Murray, Stan Rogers and Ken Tobias.

The series ended following Osburne's death on 16 July 1977. A tribute broadcast was presented in the show's time slot on 22 July 1977.

== Scheduling ==
The half-hour series was broadcast Fridays at 7:30 p.m. (Eastern) from 8 April to 15 July 1977.
