= Bootlegger's Brewery =

Craft brewery in California

Bootlegger's Brewery LLC
- Industry: Alcoholic beverage
- Founded: 2008
- Headquarters: Fullerton, California
- Key people: Aaron Barkenhagen; Patricia Barkenhagen
- Products: Beer
- Production output: 5,500 US barrels/year (2012)
- Number of employees: 23

Bootlegger's Brewery is a craft beer brewery based in Fullerton, California, and is one of the largest breweries in Orange County, California.

== Brewery ==
Bootlegger's was founded in 2008 in Fullerton with a combined tasting room and brewery. In 2012, Bootlegger's moved its production to a new, larger brewing facility, also in Fullerton. Aaron Barkenhagen has stated plans to quadruple production with the new facility. As of 2012, Bootlegger's Brewery's tasting room remains at the original location while the brewery develops a new tasting room in Downtown Fullerton.

== Beers ==
=== Year-round beers ===
- Old World Hefeweizen – 5.0% ABV, 8.1 IBU - German Style Unfiltered Wheat Ale
- Palomino Pale Ale – 5.5% ABV, 19.5 IBU -Classic American Pale Ale
- Rustic Rye IPA – 6.2% ABV, 90.9 IBU - Rye India Pale Ale
- Black Phoenix – 6.7% ABV, 39.8 IBU - Chipotle Coffee Stout
- Golden Chaos - 8.5% ABV, 27.5 IBU - Belgian Style Golden Ale

=== Collaborations ===
- Holiday Strong Ale with Pizza Port and Newport Beach Brewing Company
- Chocosaurus Rye with The Bruery
