= R. Paul Dhillon =

Indian-Canadian journalist

R. Paul Dhillon is an Indo-Canadian journalist and head of MMM Films and Blueberry Street Motion Pictures. Dhillon is also a film writer, director, producer and cinematographer. Dhillon is a graduate of Simon Fraser University.

In addition to his work in film, Dhillon is the editor of British Columbia's oldest weekly newspaper, The Link. He received the Best National Editorial Award from the Ethnic Journalists Association in 2005 for his reportage on the Kanishka tragedy.

== Filmography ==
- Sweet Amerika (2008), starring Bollywood icon Gulshan Grover and Canadian actors Remi Clair, Sian Sladen, Melanie Papalia, David Stuart and Kit Koon
- Planet Aaj (1997/98), a South Asian variety show shown on Baton Broadcasting's flagship Canadian National Television station VTV (now BC-CTV – Channel 9)
- Saint Soldier (1999/2000) – a one-hour documentary on B.C.'s Sikh community also for CTV
- Slices of My Life (1992/93), a slice of the immigrant experience
- South Van Stud (1992), a play for Expressions '92 Youth Festival
- Autumn Leaves (1990/91), a short film which was selected at Montreal's Student Film Festival

=== Author credits ===
- The Fusion Generation
- Spiceland
