= Antony Holland =

British actor and theatre director (1920–2015)

Antony Holland CM
- Born: 28 March 1920; Tiverton, Devon, England
- Died: 29 July 2015 (aged 95); Nanaimo, British Columbia, Canada
- Occupations: actor, playwright, director

Antony Holland CM (28 March 1920 – 29 July 2015) was an English actor, playwright and theatre director who until his death in 2015 lived on Gabriola Island, British Columbia, Canada.

== History ==
Holland completed his drama training at the Labour Stage in London. Shortly after, he was called into His Majesty's Armed Forces as a signalman at the onset of the Second World War. While training at the coastal town of South Shields, he put on a play in a local abandoned theatre. Holland continued to mount productions in his spare time throughout the course of the war. He was granted the officers' lounge for rehearsals and cast approximately 100 men in a wide variety of roles, including parts that required playing women. His plays continued through the North African Campaign, crossed the desert, and made it to Cairo where he would mount productions at the Khedivial Opera House. So successful were his plays that the military requisitioned stage materials for more elaborate productions. Holland was transferred into military intelligence where he served out the remainder of the war.

In 1946, Laurence Olivier founded the Bristol Old Vic Theatre School where Holland was vice principal for nearly a decade. Holland moved to Vancouver in 1957 and remained in British Columbia until his death in July 2015. In 1965, he founded a theatre arts program at the King Edward Campus of Vancouver Community College. The school relocated to Langara College and formally took on the name of Studio 58. Holland retired as artistic director in 1985, and returned to professional acting, directing and writing. Shortly after moving to Gabriola Island, he established a new theatre company at the Gabriola Theatre Centre.

== Select credits ==
Year	Title	Role	Notes
1971	McCabe & Mrs. Miller	Hollander	
1982	The Grey Fox	Judge	
1983	The Best Christmas Pageant Ever	Reverend Hopkins	
1987	Housekeeping	Mr. Wallace	
1988	Backfire	Judge Hardin	
1988	The Accused	Plea Bargain Lawyer	
1989	Cousins	Wedding Priest	
1989	We're No Angels	Doctor	
1989	MacGyver	Vincent Battaglia	1 episode
1989-1991	Captain N: The Game Master	Doctor Light	Voice, 33 episodes
1990	Narrow Margin	Elderly Man	
1990-1991	The New Adventures of He-Man	Master Sebrian	Voice, 65 episodes
1991	Bingo	Circus Vet	
1991	K2	Priest	
1992	Impolite	Jimmy	
1995	Last of the Dogmen	Doc Carvey	
2004	Kingdom Hospital	Lenny Stillmach	5 episodes
2004	12 Days of Christmas Eve	Hank Carter	
2002	King Lear	King Lear	Studio 58
2006	Arts Club Theatre Company	Morrie	Tuesday with Morrie
2006	Eureka	Irvin Horatio Thatcher	1 episode
2008	The Merchant of Venice	Shylock	Studio 58
2009	Battlestar Galactica	Julius Baltar	1 episode
2011	Supernatural	Westborough	1 episode

== Honours ==
- The recipient of three Jessie Richardson Theatre Awards and numerous nominations.
- The recipient of four Lifetime Achievement Awards.
- Elected into the BC Entertainment Hall of Fame.
- The Antony Holland Scholarship at Langara College was made in his honour.
- Member of the Order of Canada.
