= Judith Marcuse =

Canadian dancer and choreographer

Judith Rose Marcuse (born 1947) is a Canadian dancer and choreographer. She created over 100 choreographic works many of which are focused on community-engaged art for social change. Marcuse's performance and choreographic work has been recognized in Canada and around the world.

== Dancer ==
Judith Marcuse began her dance training in Montreal and at 15 she moved to London to study at the Royal Ballet School where her training combined modern dance influences with a traditional classical ballet education. During her early career, Marcuse performed with various companies including Les Grands Ballets Canadiens, Bat-Dor Dance Company in Israel, Ballets de Genève in Switzerland and Oakland Ballet in the United States, and finally London's Ballet Rambert where Marcuse began to choreograph dances herself.

== Choreography career ==
In 1976, Marcuse moved to Vancouver and started her own dance company named Judith Marcuse Dance Projects Society in 1978 and then Repertory Dance Company of Canada in 1983, which later was renamed Judith Marcuse Dance Company. Marcuse created Seascapes (1984), Madrugada (1990), States of Grace (1994), Time Out (1986), The Waltz (1981), Traces (1985), Moving Past Neutral (1988) and others. Marcuse created experimental interdisciplinary performances that combined art with social issues beginning with The Kiss Project (1995-2000) that became an annual festival 1995-2000. Later, building on the work of art for social change innovators, such as Augusto Boal and David Diamond, Marcuse created ICE: beyond cool focused on teen suicide, FIRE …. where there is smoke exploring violence and EARTH=home emphasizing environmental protection. These projects were results of collaboration with playwrights, community consultations and local partnerships.

== Teacher ==
In 2007, Judith Marcuse became a founder/co-director of the International Center of Art for Social Change (ICASC) at Simon Fraser University. At the Center she led research study from 2013 to 2019 on Art for Social Change (ASC) in Canada that focused on art that is created collectively by groups of people about what is important to them. The study resulted in establishment of a two-year graduate program in ASC for the Faculty of Education at the SFU. Marcuse is also Senior Fellow of Ashoka International, an organization of world’s leading social entrepreneurs.

== Awards ==
- Jean A. Chalmers Award for Choreography (1976)
- Clifford E. Lee Award for Choreography (1979)
- Honorary Doctor of Laws degree from Simon Fraser University (2000) - awarded "in recognition of her groundbreaking redefinition of dance that combines artistic excellence with relevance to the community"
- Jacqueline Lemieux Prize (2009), the dance-only performing arts prize of the Canada Council for the Arts
