= Ivan Ackery =

Movie theatre manager (1899–1989)

Ivan Ackery (October 30, 1899 – October 29, 1989) was a movie theatre manager and entertainment promoter in Vancouver, British Columbia. He was the manager of Vancouver's Orpheum Theatre during its peak period from the 1930s to the 1960s.

== Early years ==
Born and raised in Bristol, England, Ackery moved to Canada in 1914, arriving in Montreal and going from there to Vancouver. After serving in Europe with the Canadian Army during World War I, Ackery returned to Vancouver to further his education before moving in 1920 to Calgary, Alberta, beginning his long career in the entertainment industry as an usher at the Capitol Theatre, then the flagship of Famous Players' Calgary operations, in 1921.

After returning to Vancouver in 1923, Ackery became an usher at that city's Capitol Theatre before his promotion to manager of the Victoria Theatre in south Vancouver in 1927. It was during his tenure there that Ackery began developing the promotional ideas that he would use in cinema management for the next four decades.

Ackery was then promoted to manage the Dominion Theatre in downtown Vancouver in 1930, then was sent to Victoria to manage the Capitol Theatre there in 1932. While at the Victoria Capitol, Ackery introduced and promoted monthly midnight movies on Sundays, during a period when local bylaws prohibited Sunday movies, then persuaded Famous Players to allow him to play a Victoria-filmed feature at the Capitol called Crimson Paradise, which drew packed houses during its run thanks to heavy promotion by Ackery. Saturday afternoon children's matinees also were begun and became popular at the Capitol during Ackery's tenure.

In 1934, Ackery returned to Vancouver when Famous Players promoted him to manage the Strand Theatre (located on the future site of Vancouver Centre in the downtown area), where he promoted live stage shows and popular British films. He was subsequently promoted to become the manager of the Orpheum in the summer of 1935.

== The Orpheum Theatre years (1935-1969) ==
Faced with both the Great Depression and competition from other Famous Players theatres and locally owned independent cinemas, Ackery set out to present major-release feature films and live shows featuring popular acts of the day at the Orpheum.

Under Ackery, the theatre, the largest movie house in Vancouver at the time, was frequently picked to show movie premieres in Canada, often world or Canadian premieres (such as 1939's Gone with the Wind, 1942's The Forest Rangers [in which one of that movie's stars, Susan Hayward, appeared in person for the world premiere at the Orpheum], and the 1965 James Clavell World War II feature King Rat). Live shows at the Orpheum during the Ackery years featured performing greats like Louis Armstrong, Duke Ellington, Lionel Hampton, Ella Fitzgerald, Tommy Dorsey, George Burns, Jack Benny and Chief Dan George.

Ackery would win several promotional awards during his Orpheum years, most notably the Quigley Award (awarded by the Motion Picture Herald trade publication to movie promoters who were judged to have delivered outstanding movie promotion campaigns) in 1947 and 1952.

== Retirement and death ==
Ackery, then aged 69, retired as manager of the Orpheum in 1969 after Famous Players introduced a new clause requiring mandatory retirement for its employees at age 65. Despite retirement, he carried on in public life in Vancouver, most notably spearheading the campaign to save the Orpheum when, in 1973, Famous Players announced plans to have the palatial cinema gutted and turned into a multiplex (a fate which would later befall the nearby Capitol, also FP-owned). Thanks to Ackery's efforts, which included contributions by Vancouver city council and other entities and several benefit concerts (including an engagement by Jack Benny), the city bought the Orpheum on March 19, 1974. The theatre showed its final movie, Return to Macon County, on November 23, 1975, then was renovated over the next year and reopened on April 2, 1977 as the new home of the Vancouver Symphony Orchestra.

Ackery wrote his autobiography on his years with Famous Players and in theatre management and promotion, Fifty Years on Theatre Row, which was published in 1980. He died on October 29, 1989, in West Vancouver, British Columbia, one day shy of his 90th birthday.

== Reference sources ==
- Ackery, Ivan - Fifty Years on Theatre Row; Hancock House, 1980 (ISBN 0-88839-050-5)
- Long-time Orpheum manager Ivan Ackery dies (scroll down to October 29)
- Details of Ivan Ackery's last post from Legion Magazine.com
