= Vancouver Playhouse (theatre venue) =

Theatre in British Columbia, Canada

- Interactive map of Vancouver Playhouse
- Address: 600 Hamilton Street; Vancouver, British Columbia; V6B 2P1
- Coordinates: 49.2807°N 123.11245°W
- Owner: City of Vancouver
- Capacity: 668

Construction
- Opened: 1962
- Architect: Arcop

Website
- vancouvercivictheatres.com/venues/vancouver-playhouse/

The Vancouver Playhouse is a civic theatre venue in Vancouver, British Columbia, Canada. Along with the Orpheum, the Queen Elizabeth Theatre and the Annex, it is one of four facilities operated by the Vancouver Civic Theatres Department (the Playhouse adjoins the QE Theatre in the same complex).

The venue is situated at the corner of Hamilton and Dunsmuir and seats 668 plus 5 wheelchairs. Several local arts organizations perform regularly at the venue, including the Vancouver Recital Society, Friends of Chamber Music and DanceHouse.
