= Emily Molnar =

Emily Molnar CM (born September 7, 1973) is a Canadian dancer. From July 2009 to August 2020, she served as the artistic director of Ballet BC, and in 2014, became Artistic Director of Dance at the cultural education institute Banff Centre for Arts and Creativity in Banff, Canada.

A graduate of The National Ballet School of Canada, Molnar is a former member of Ballet BC and the Frankfurt Ballet, where she performed repertoire under director William Forsythe and as principal dancer with Ballet BC.

Molnar is an international artist who has worked and toured extensively throughout Europe, Asia, Mexico, Canada and the United States. She has created and performed several works as a choreographer and solo artist. These include commissions for Alberta Ballet, Ballet Mannheim, Ballet Augsburg, Ballet BC, Cedar Lake Dance, Pro Arte Danza, and Morphoses/The Wheeldon Company.

She has supported the proliferation of dance and recognition of dance artists.

In 2020, Molnar became artistic director of the Nederlands Dans Theater.

== Awards and honours ==
In 2016, Molnar was appointed into the Order of Canada with the grade of member.
