= Orpheum (Vancouver) =

Theatre and music venue in Vancouver, Canada

Coordinates: 49.280096°N 123.120196°W

The Orpheum Theatre
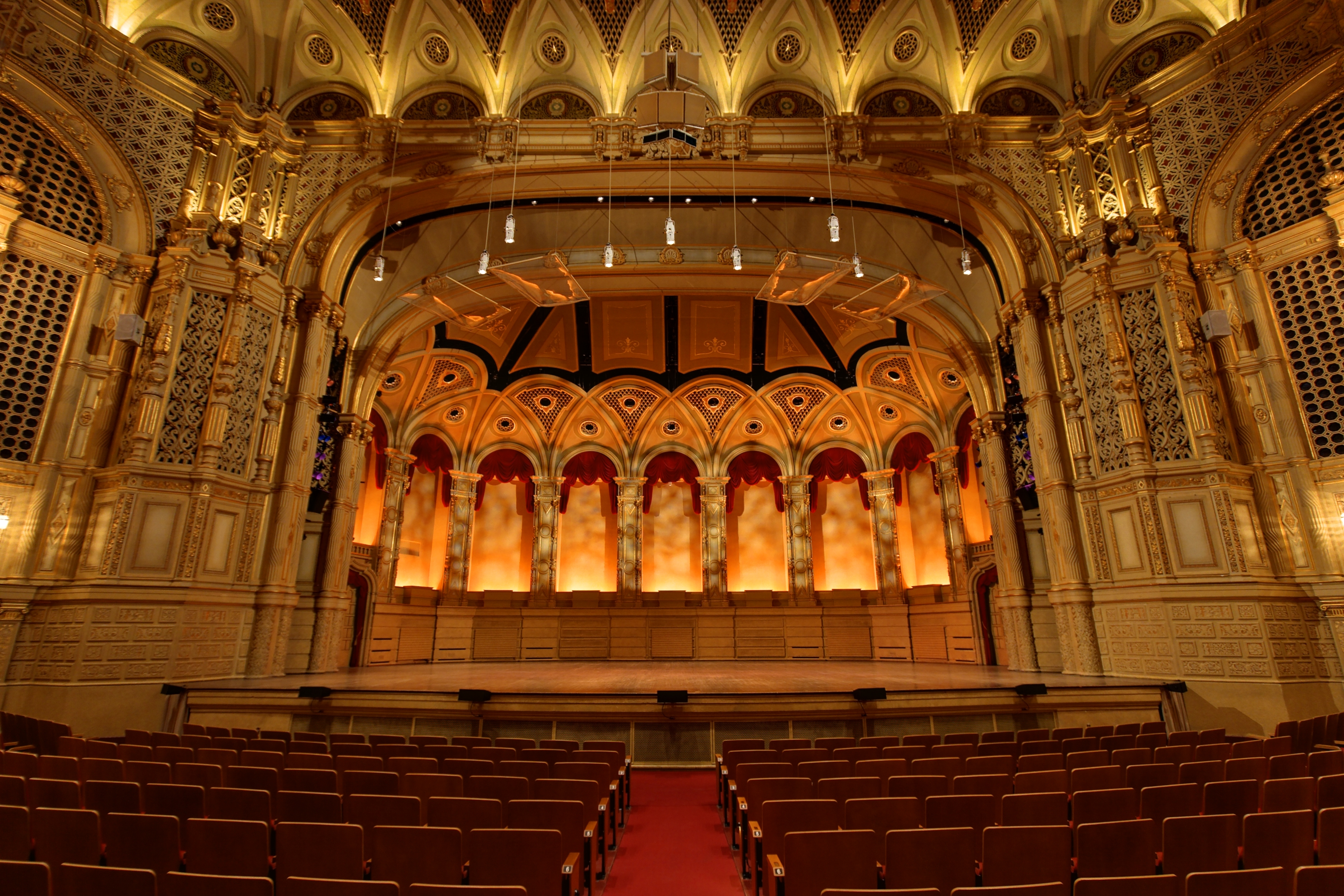
- Interior of the theatre
- Interactive map of The Orpheum Theatre
- Former names: New Orpheum
- Location: 601 Smithe Street; Vancouver, British Columbia, Canada; V6B 3L4
- Owner: The City of Vancouver (formerly owned by Famous Players)
- Capacity: 2,672
- Type: Music venue (former movie palace)

Construction
- Opened: November 8, 1927
- Closed: November 23, 1975 and
- Reopened: April 2, 1977

National Historic Site of Canada
- Official name: Orpheum Theatre National Historic Site of Canada
- Designated: 1979

The Orpheum is a theatre and music venue in Vancouver, British Columbia, Canada. Along with the Queen Elizabeth Theatre, the Vancouver Playhouse, and the Annex, it is part of the Vancouver Civic Theatres group of live performance venues. It is the permanent home of the Vancouver Symphony Orchestra. The Orpheum is located on Granville Street near Smithe Street in Vancouver's downtown core. The interior of the theatre was featured in the 2004 reboot of Battlestar Galactica, where it is dressed to portray a heavenly opera house.

== History ==
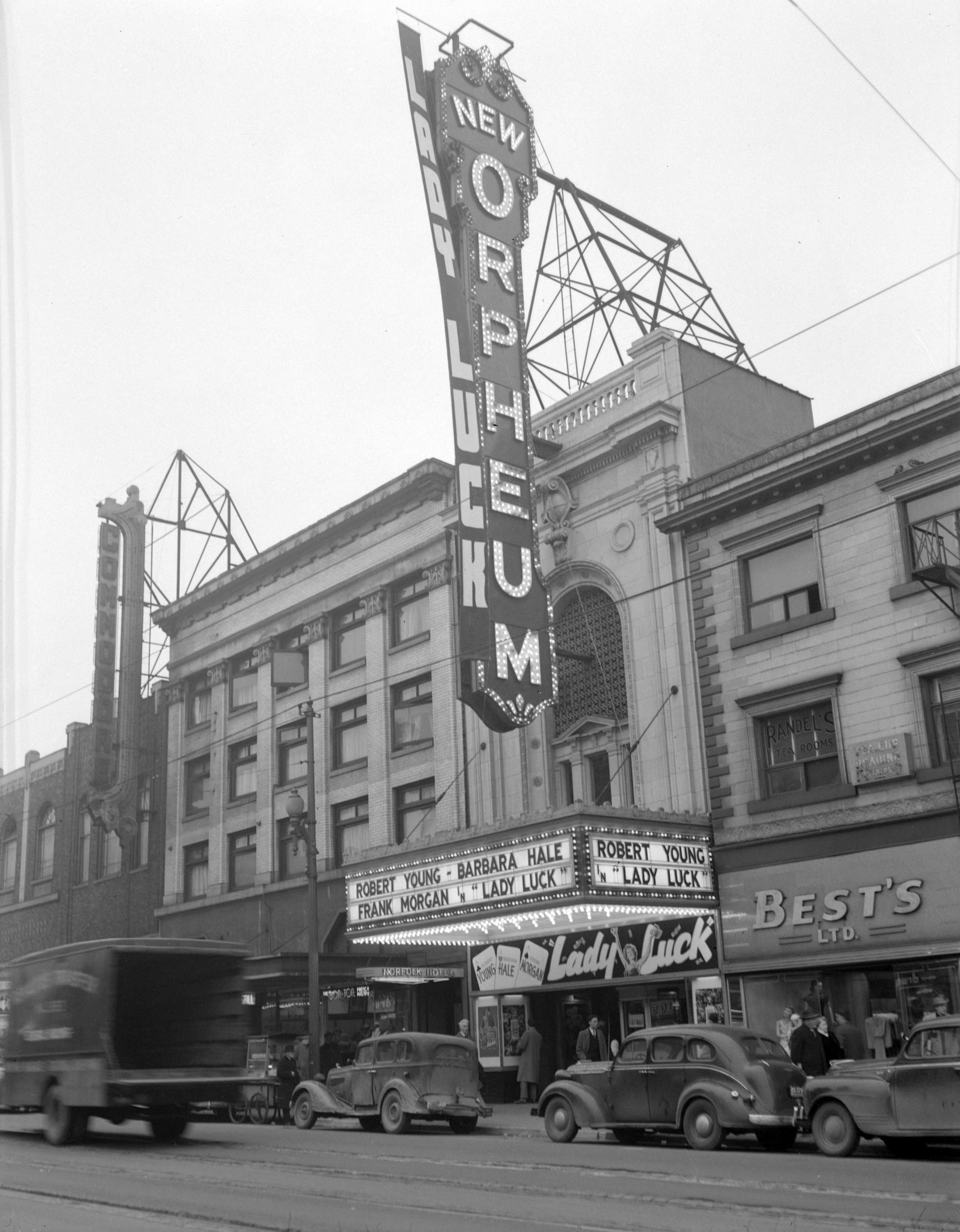
The Orpheum advertising the movie Lady Luck, circa 1946.

Designed by Scottish architect Marcus Priteca, the theatre hosted its first shows on November 7, 1927 and officially opened as a vaudeville house the next day. The old Orpheum, at 761 Granville Street, was renamed the Vancouver Theatre (later the Lyric, then the International Cinema, then the Lyric once more before it closed for demolition in 1969 to make way for the first phase of the Pacific Centre project). The New Orpheum, which was the biggest theatre in Canada when it opened in 1927, with three thousand seats, cost $1.25 million to construct. The first manager of the theatre was William A. Barnes.

Following the end of vaudeville's heyday in the early 1930s, the Orpheum became primarily a movie house under Famous Players ownership, although it would continue to host live events on occasion. Ivan Ackery managed the Orpheum during most of this period, from 1935 up until his 1969 retirement.

In 1973, for economic reasons, Famous Players decided to gut the inside of the Orpheum and change it into a multiplex. A "Save the Orpheum" public protest and fundraising campaign was launched, which even Jack Benny flew in to help with, and the Orpheum was saved. On March 19, 1974, the City of Vancouver bought the theatre for $7.1 million, with $3.1 million coming from the city itself, and $1.5 million from each of the provincial and federal governments. The Orpheum closed on November 23, 1975, and a renovation and restoration was done by the architectural company Thomson, Berwick, Pratt and Partners. It re-opened on April 2, 1977, and has since been the permanent home of the Vancouver Symphony Orchestra. Tony Heinsbergen, a U.S. designer who originally chose the colour scheme for the interior (ivory, moss green, gold and burgundy) was brought back, fifty years later, for the renovation. In 1983, an additional entrance was opened on Smithe Street.

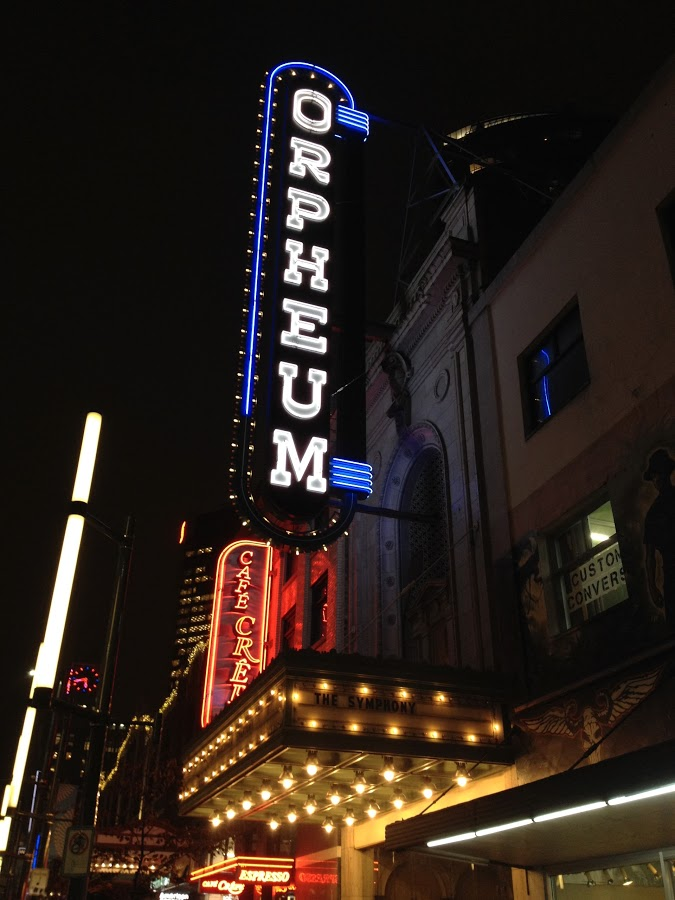
The Orpheum's present neon sign was installed in the 1970s.

The theatre was designated a National Historic Site of Canada in 1979. The Orpheum's present neon sign was installed during the 1970s, donated to the theatre by Jim Pattison. The theatre and its neon sign have been used as a key location in several episodes of the science-fiction series Battlestar Galactica and Fringe, as well as Highlander: The Series. It was also the location of the filming of the Dan Mangan documentary What Happens Next? by Brent Hodge.

In 2006, the Capitol Residences development was proposed for the old Capitol 6 cinema site adjacent to the Orpheum. The City of Vancouver gave the developer permission for extra height and density on their site in return for a major expansion to the Orpheum, including a long desired back stage area. This was the largest amenities trade in the history of the city, and will increase the usability of the facility.

== See also ==
- List of heritage buildings in Vancouver
- List of concert halls
- Stanley Industrial Alliance Stage
- Peter Wall
