= Dora Mavor Moore Award for Best Original Play (Independent Theatre) =

Canadian theatre award

The Dora Mavor Moore Award for Outstanding New Play, Independent Theatre is a Canadian theatre award, presented as part of the Dora Mavor Moore Awards to honour the year's best new play by a Canadian playwright which had its premiere in the Toronto theatre market in the previous year.

The award was first presented in 1988 as an award for small theatre productions. In 1993, a separate award for mid-sized theatre was introduced, with the definitions set at 200 seats or less for small theatres and 200 to 500 seats for midsize theatres. The awards were presented alongside each other to different plays until 1997; in 1998, the awards were merged as a single award for independent theatre production.

== Winners and nominees ==
=== 1980s ===
Year	Playwright	Title	Ref
1988	Stewart Lemoine	The Vile Governess and Other Psychodramas	
1988	Leah Cherniak, Robert Morgan, Martha Ross	The Anger in Ernest and Ernestine	
1988	Robin Fulford	Steel Kiss	
1988	Michael Hollingsworth	Confederation and Riel	
1988	Diego Matamoros, Dean Gilmour, Michele Smith	The Green Bird	
1989	John Mighton	Scientific Americans	
1989	Don Druick	Where Is Kabuki?	
1989	Tomson Highway	The Sage, the Dancer and the Fool	
1989	Bruce McCulloch	Jazz Stenographers	
1989	Martha Ross	Paranoia	

=== 1990s ===
Year	Playwright	Title	Ref
1990	Sky Gilbert	The Whore's Revenge: A Victorian Melodrama	
1990	Daniel MacIvor, Ken McDougall, Edward Roy	White Trash Blue Eye	
1990	Tony Nardi	A Modo Suo (A fable)	
1990	Martha Ross	Dr. Dapertutto	
1990	Raymond Storey	The Saints and the Apostles	
1991	Normand Canac-Marquis, translated by Louison Danis	The Cézanne Syndrome	
1991	Daniel Brooks, Don McKellar, Tracy Wright	Red Tape	
1991	Daniel MacIvor	Never Swim Alone	
1991	Harry Rintoul	Brave Hearts	
1991	Marcy Rogers	Nocturnal Emissions	
1992	John Mighton	A Short History of Night	
1992	Thomas Coyle	The Tyrant of Pontus	
1992	Daniel MacIvor	House	
1992	Edward Roy	Seeds	
1992	Jason Sherman	The League of Nathans	
1993	Mid-Sized Theatre		
1993	Neil Munro	Bob's Kingdom	
1993	Normand Chaurette, translated by Linda Gaboriau	The Queens	
1993	Sean Dixon	1492	
1993	Ann-Marie MacDonald, Nic Gotham	Nigredo Hotel	
1993	David Young	Glenn	
1993	Small Theatre		
1993	Michael Hollingsworth	The Great War	
1993	Michael Hollingsworth	The Life and Times of Mackenzie King	
1993	James O'Reilly	Ghetto	
1993	Edward Roy	A Secret Life	
1994	Mid-Sized Theatre		
1994	George Bwanika Seremba	Come Good Rain	
1994	Simon Fortin	Le Pays dans la gorge	
1994	Robert Fothergill	Public Lies	
1994	Stewart Lemoine	Shockers Delight!	
1994	Jason Sherman	Three in the Back, Two in the Head	
1994	Small Theatre		
1994	Soheil Parsa, Peter Farbridge	The Death of the King	
1994	Daniel Brooks, Leah Cherniak, Diane Flacks, Richard Greenblatt, Leslie Lester, Allan Merovitz	The Theory of Relatives	
1994	Kelley Jo Burke	Charming and Rose: True Love	
1994	Ken Garnhum	Pants on Fire	
1994	Michael Hollingsworth	WWII	
1995	Mid-Sized Theatre		
1995	Brad Fraser	Poor Super Man	
1995	Daniel Brooks, Don McKellar, Tracy Wright	86	
1995	Jean-Marc Dalpé	Eddy	
1995	Daniel Danis, translated by Linda Gaboriau	Stone and Ashes	
1995	Colleen Wagner	The Monument	
1995	Small Theatre		
1995	Sabina Fella	Lebensborn	
1995	Dave Carley	Into	
1995	Leah Cherniak	The Attic, the Pearls, and 3 Fine Girls	
1995	Edward Riche	Possible Maps	
1996	Mid-Sized Theatre		
1996	Lee MacDougall	High Life	
1996	Bill Harrar	Inquest	
1996	Daniel MacIvor, Daniel Brooks	Here Lies Henry	
1996	John Mighton	The Little Years	
1996	Jason Sherman	The Retreat	
1996	Small Theatre		
1996	Drew Hayden Taylor	Only Drunks and Children Tell the Truth	
1996	Audrey Butler	Medusa Rising	
1996	Michael Hollingsworth	The Cold War	
1996	Bryan James	Stockholm(e)	
1996	Guillermo Verdecchia, Marcus Youssef	A Line in the Sand	
1997	Mid-Sized Theatre		
1997	Theresa Tova	Still the Night	
1997	Buddies in Bad Times	The Martha Stewart Projects	
1997	Carole Fréchette, translated by John Murrell	The Four Lives of Marie	
1997	Daniel MacIvor	The Soldier Dreams	
1997	Judith Thompson	Sled	
1997	Small Theatre		
1997	Djanet Sears	Harlem Duet	
1997	Robin Fulford	Gulag	
1997	Michael Hollingsworth	The Global Village Part II: Trudeau and the FLQ	
1997	Leonard Linklater, Patti Flather	Sixty Below	
1997	Jonathan Wilson	My Own Private Oshawa	
1998	Michael Healey	Kicked	
1998	Carol Bolt	Famous	
1998	Morris Ertman, Ron Reed	Tent Meeting	
1998	Sky Gilbert	Schubert Lied	
1998	M. J. Kang	Noran Bang: The Yellow Room	
1999	Anton Piatigorsky	Easy Lenny Lazmon and the Great Western Ascension	
1999	Chris Abraham	Lenz	
1999	Karen Hines	HELLO...HELLO	
1999	Darren O'Donnell	White Mice	
1999	M. NourbeSe Philip	Coups and Calypsos	
1999	Peter Reitzel	Spirits	

=== 2000s ===
Year	Playwright	Title	Ref
2000	Michael Redhill	Building Jerusalem	
2000	Sky Gilbert	The Emotionalists	
2000	Dean Gilmour, Michele Smith	Chekhov's Shorts	
2000	Anton Piatigorsky	The Offering	
2000	Chaz Thorne	The Dogpatch	
2001	Chris Earle	RADIO:30	
2001	Adam Nashman	The 3º Cabaret	
2001	Anton Piatigorsky	The Kabbalistic Psychoanalysis of Adam R. Tzaddik	
2001	Michael Spence	The Exit Room	
2001	David Widdicombe	Science Fiction	
2002	Dean Gilmour, Michele Smith	Chekhov Longs...In the Ravine	
2002	Hrant Alianak	The Walls of Africa	
2002	Ned Dickens	Icara	
2002	Sarah Phillips	Antigone	
2002	Jacob Richmond	The Qualities of Zero	
2002	Jennifer Tarver	History Play	
2003	Mike McPhaden	Poochwater	
2003	Dave Carley	Orchidelirum	
2003	Michael Kennard, John Turner	Mump and Smoot in Flux	
2003	Matthew MacFadzean	Richardthesecond	
2003	Richard Sanger	Two Words for Snow	
2003	Eric Woolfe	Grendelmaus	
2004	Bluemouth Inc.	something about a river	
2004	Darrell Dennis	Tales of an Urban Indian	
2004	Abbas Nalbandian, translated by Soheil Parsa and Peter Farbridge	Stories from the Rains of Love and Death	
2004	Beatriz Pizano	For Sale	
2004	Eric Woolfe	Dear Boss	
2005	Tara Beagan	Thy Neighbour's Wife	
2005	Erika Batdorf	Poetic License	
2005	Andy Massingham	Rough House	
2005	Gord Rand	Pond Life	
2005	Rick Roberts	Kite	
2006	Anosh Irani	Bombay Black	
2006	Sue Balint, Daryl Cloran, Alena Dzebo, Holly Lewis, Christopher Morris, Tanja Smoje and Dylan Trowbridge	Return: The Sarajevo Project	
2006	Mark Brownell	Medici Slot Machine	
2006	Alex Poch-Goldin	Cringeworthy	
2006	Judith Thompson	Enoch Arden by Alfred, Lord Jabber and his Catatonic Songstress	
2007	Bruce Alcock, Kate Alton, Rafael Barreto-Rivera, bpNichol, Paul Dutton, Steve MacCaffrey, Ross Manson	The Four Horsemen Project	
2007	Erika Batdorf, Christine Horne, Matthew Romantini	Gorey Story	
2007	Brandon Firla, Kurt Firla	SARSical	
2007	Catherine Hernandez	Singkil	
2007	Tony Nardi	Two Letters	
2008	Anusree Roy	Pyaasa	
2008	Brendan Gall	A Quiet Place	
2008	Michael Hollingsworth	Laurier	
2008	Beatriz Pizano	Madre	
2008	Michael Rubenfeld	My Fellow Creatures	
2009	Anton Piatigorsky	Eternal Hydra	
2009	Tara Beagan	Miss Julie: Sheh'mah	
2009	Layne Coleman	Tijuana Cure	
2009	Brendan Gall, Mike McPhaden, Rick Roberts, Julie Tepperman	The Gladstone Variations	
2009	David Yee	lady in the red dress	

=== 2010s ===
Year	Playwright	Title	Ref
2010	Donna-Michelle St. Bernard	Gas Girls	
2010	Hannah Moscovitch	The Mill (Part Two): The Huron Bride	
2010	Beatriz Pizano	La Comuniòn	
2010	Michele Smith, Dean Gilmour, Ravi Jain, Adam Paolozza	Spent	
2010	Norman Yeung	Pu-Erh	
2011	Sky Gilbert	The Situationists	
2011	Maev Beaty, Erin Shields, Andrea Donaldson	Montparnasse	
2011	Jovanni Sy	A Taste of Empire	
2011	Darrah Teitel	The Apology	
2011	Eric Woolfe	Madhouse Variations	
2012	Jules Lewis	Tomasso's Party	
2012	Heather Marie Annis, Amy Lee, Byron Laviolette	Morro and Jasp: Go Bake Yourself	
2012	Hume Baugh	Crush	
2012	Adam Paolozza, Arif Mirabdolbaghi	The Double	
2012	Eric Woolfe	Doc Wuthergloom's Haunted Medicine Show	
2013	Adam Seybold	The De Chardin Project	
2013	Sky Gilbert	A Few Brittle Leaves	
2013	Daniel Karasik	The Biographer	
2013	Michele Smith, Dean Gilmour	As I Lay Dying	
2013	Jordan Tannahill	Post Eden	
2014	Rosamund Small	Vitals	
2014	Sheila Heti	All Our Happy Days Are Stupid	
2014	Litmus Theatre Collective	Birth of Frankenstein	
2014	Alanna Mitchell	Sea Sick	
2014	Christina Serra, Michele Smith, Dan Watson	Ralph + Lina	
2015	Jordan Tannahill	Concord Floral	
2015	Florence Gibson MacDonald	How Do I Love Thee?	
2015	Amy Nostbakken, Norah Sadava	Mouthpiece	
2015	Beatriz Pizano, Trevor Schwellnus, Lyon Smith	What I Learned from a Decade of Fear	
2015	Judith Thompson	Watching Glory Die	
2016	Cliff Cardinal	Huff	
2016	Nicolas Billon	Butcher	
2016	Rachel Blair	A Man Walks Into a Bar	
2016	Karen Hines	Crawlspace	
2016	d'bi.young anitafrika	She Mami Wata & The Pussy Witchhunt	
2017	Ngozi Paul	The Emancipation of Ms. Lovely	
2017	Michael Ross Albert	Tough Jews	
2017	Tony Diamanti, Dan Watson, Christina Serra, Karin Randoja, Liz MacDougall	This Is the Point	
2017	Evan Webber	Other Jesus	
2017	Eric Woolfe	The Harrowing of Brimstone McReedy	
2018	Matthew MacKenzie	Bears	
2018	Miranda Calderon, Adam Paolozza, Liz Peterson, Guillermo Verdecchia, Dan Watson	Flashing Lights	
2018	daniel jelani ellis	speaking of sneaking	
2018	Lauren Gillis, Alaine Hutton	Mr. Truth	
2018	Falen Johnson	Ipperwash	
2019	Christopher Morris	The Runner	
2019	Augusto Bitter	Chicho	
2019	Meegwun Fairbrother, Jack Grinhaus	Isitwendam	
2019	Ho Ka Kei (Jeff Ho)	Iphigenia and the Furies (On Taurian Land)	
2019	Matthew MacKenzie	After the Fire	

=== 2020s ===
Year	Playwright	Title	Ref
2020	Keith Barker	This Is How We Got Here	
2020	Jani Lauzon	Prophecy Fog	
2020	Robin Luckwaldt, Natalia Bushnik	The Bathtub Girls	
2020	Daniel MacIvor	Let's Run Away	
2020	David Yee	No Foreigners	
2021	No ceremony held due to the effect of the COVID-19 pandemic in Canada on theatre production in 2020.		
2022	Bad New Days	Italian Mime Suicide	
2022	Akosua Amo-Adem, Qasim Khan, Cheyenne Scott	The Home Project	
2022	Steven Elliott Jackson	Three Ordinary Men	
2022	Neha Poduval, Himanshu Sitlani	An IMM-Permanent Resident	
2022	Theatre Gargantua	A Tonic for Desperate Times	
2023	Matthew MacKenzie, Mariya Khomutova	First Métis Man of Odesa	
2023	Curtis Campbell, Daniel Krolik	Gay for Pay with Blake and Clay	
2023	Deanna H. Choi, Maddie Bautista, Erin Brubacher	Love You Wrong Time	
2023	Haley McGee	The Ex-Boyfriend Yard Sale	
2023	Hengameh E. Rice	Anahita's Republic	
2024	Peter N. Bailey	Tyson's Song	
2024	Cliff Cardinal	(Everyone I Love Has) A Terrible Fate (Befall Them)	
2024	Andrew Gurza, Ken Harrower, Frank Hull, Debbie Patterson, Brian Postalian, Jonathan Seinen	Access Me	
2024	Gregory Prest	Bremen Town	
2024	Payam Saeedi	Voiceless	
2025	Makram Ayache	The Tempest: A Witch in Algiers	
2025	David Danzon	Mukashi, Mukashi (Once Upon a Time)	
2025	Veronica Hortigüela, Annie Luján	Monks	
2025	Adam Paolozza	Last Landscape	
2025	Rosamund Small	Performance Review	
2026	Andrew Kushnir	The Division	
2026	Makram Ayache	The Green Line	
2026	Susanna Fournier	take rimbaud	
2026	Lauren Gillis, Alaine Hutton	Public Consumption	
2026	Jesse McQueen	Romeo Pimp	
