= Michael Nathanson =

Michael Nathanson may refer to:

- Michael Nathanson (actor), American actor
- Michael Nathanson (director), Canadian playwright and theatre director
- Michael Nathanson (film executive), American film industry executive
