= Carol Bolt Award =

Canadian literary award

The Carol Bolt Award is an annual Canadian literary award. Presented by the Playwrights Guild of Canada, the award is bestowed for a theatrical play premiere by a PGC member, judged to be the year's best. The award is named in memory of Canadian playwright, Carol Bolt.

== Winners ==
- 2002 - Kent Stetson, The Harps of God
- 2003 - Daniel Goldfarb, Adam Baum and the Jew Movie
- 2004 - Florence Gibson, Home Is My Road
- 2005 - Mieko Ouchi, The Red Priest (Eight Ways To Say Goodbye)
- 2006 - John Mighton, Half Life
- 2007 - Stephen Massicotte, The Oxford Roof Climber's Rebellion
- 2008 - Colleen Murphy, The December Man
- 2009 - Vern Thiessen, Vimy
- 2010 - Michael Nathanson, Talk
- 2011 - Anusree Roy, Brothel #9
- 2012 - Don Hannah, The Cave Painter
- 2013 - David Yee, carried away on the crest of a wave
- 2014 - Colleen Murphy, Pig Girl
- 2015 - Jordan Tannahill, Concord Floral
- 2016 - Lisa Codrington, Up the Garden Path
- 2017 - Kate Hennig, The Virgin Trial
- 2018 - Matthew MacKenzie, Bears
- 2019 - Amy Rutherford, Mortified
- 2020 - Keith Barker, This Is How We Got Here
- 2021 - No award was presented this year due to the COVID-19 pandemic
- 2022 - No award was presented this year due to the COVID-19 pandemic
- 2023 - Natalie Meisner, Legislating Love: The Everett Klippert Story
- 2024 - Donna-Michelle St. Bernard, Diggers
