= Tarnopolsky =

Tarnopolsky (feminine: Tarnopolskaya) is a toponymic surname literally meaning "someone from Tarnopol". Notable people with the surname include:

- Damian Tarnopolsky, Canadian writer
- Vladimir Tarnopolsky, Russian-Ukrainian composer
- Walter Tarnopolsky (1932–1993), Canadian judge and legal scholar
- Zhanna Pintusevich-Block (née Tarnopolskaya; born 1972), Ukrainian sprinter
