= Piatigorsky =

Piatigorsky, a Jewish surname of Russian origin (means "from Pyatigorsk"), may refer to:

- Alexander Piatigorsky, Russian philosopher
- Anton Piatigorsky, Canadian-American playwright and writer
- Gregor Piatigorsky, cellist
- Jacqueline Piatigorsky, née Rotschild, chess and tennis player and philanthropist, wife of G. Piatogorsky
- Leonid Piatigorsky, Soviet physicist
