= 2021 NextEra Energy 250 =

Race details
- Race 1 of 23 in the 2021 NASCAR Camping World Truck Series season
- Date: February 12, 2021
- Location: Daytona International Speedway in Daytona Beach, Florida
- Course: Permanent racing facility
- Course length: 2.5 miles (4.023 km)
- Distance: 101 laps, 252.5 mi (406.359 km)
- Scheduled distance: 100 laps, 250 mi (402.336 km)

Pole position
Driver	Johnny Sauter	ThorSport Racing
- Time: 49.733

Most laps led
Driver	Chandler Smith	Kyle Busch Motorsports
- Laps: 22

Winner
No. 99	Ben Rhodes	ThorSport Racing

Television in the United States
- Network: FS1
- Announcers: Vince Welch, Michael Waltrip, Jamie McMurray

Radio in the United States
- Radio: MRN

The 2021 NextEra Energy 250 was a NASCAR Camping World Truck Series race held on February 12, 2021. Contested over 101 laps due to an overtime finish, on the 2.5-mile (4.0 km) asphalt superspeedway. It was the first race of the 2021 NASCAR Camping World Truck Series season. Ben Rhodes of ThorSport Racing would win the race passing Cory Roper on the final lap.

== Entry list ==
No.	Driver	Team	Manufacturer	Sponsor
1	Hailie Deegan (R)	David Gilliland Racing	Ford	Monster Energy
02	Kris Wright (R)	Young's Motorsports	Chevrolet	F.N.B. Corporation
2	Sheldon Creed	GMS Racing	Chevrolet	International Brotherhood of Electrical Workers, UA Plumbers & Pipefitters
3	Jordan Anderson (i)	Jordan Anderson Racing	Chevrolet	Swann Security "Security Made Smarter"
04	Cory Roper	Roper Racing	Ford	Alliance Aviation
4	John Hunter Nemechek	Kyle Busch Motorsports	Toyota	Fire Alarm Services, Inc.
6	Norm Benning	Norm Benning Racing	Chevrolet	MDF A Sign Co.
8	Joe Nemechek	NEMCO Motorsports	Ford	Daltile
9	Codie Rohrbaugh	CR7 Motorsports	Chevrolet	Grant County Mulch, In Loving Memory of Mark Huff
10	Jennifer Jo Cobb	Jennifer Jo Cobb Racing	Chevrolet	Fastener Supply
11	Spencer Davis	Spencer Davis Motorsports	Toyota	Inox Supreme Lubrication
12	Tate Fogleman	Young's Motorsports	Chevrolet	Solid Rock Carriers
13	Johnny Sauter	ThorSport Racing	Toyota	Vivitar
15	Tanner Gray	David Gilliland Racing	Ford	Ford Performance
16	Austin Hill	Hattori Racing Enterprises	Toyota	United Rentals
17	David Gilliland	David Gilliland Racing	Ford	Black's Tire, BTS Tire & Wheel Distributors
18	Chandler Smith (R)	Kyle Busch Motorsports	Toyota	Safelite Auto Glass
19	Derek Kraus	McAnally-Hilgemann Racing	Toyota	Shockwave Marine Suspension Seating
20	Spencer Boyd	Young's Motorsports	Chevrolet	American Pavement Specialists, Raised On Blacktop
21	Zane Smith	GMS Racing	Chevrolet	Michael Roberts Construction
22	Austin Wayne Self	AM Racing	Chevrolet	AM Technical Solutions, GO TEXAN.
23	Chase Purdy (R)	GMS Racing	Chevrolet	Bama Buggies
24	Raphaël Lessard	GMS Racing	Chevrolet	Canac
25	Timothy Peters	Rackley WAR	Chevrolet	Rackley Roofing
26	Tyler Ankrum	GMS Racing	Chevrolet	LiUNA!
28	Bryan Dauzat	FDNY Racing	Chevrolet	FDNY, O. B. Builders Door & Trim
30	Danny Bohn	On Point Motorsports	Toyota	North American Motor Car
33	Jason White	Reaume Brothers Racing	Chevrolet	YourGMCTruckStore.com, Powder Ventures Excavations
34	Jesse Iwuji	Reaume Brothers Racing	Toyota	eRacing Association
38	Todd Gilliland	Front Row Motorsports	Ford	Speedco
40	Ryan Truex	Niece Motorsports	Chevrolet	Marquis Spas "The ULTIMATE Hot Tub Experience!"
41	Dawson Cram	Cram Racing Enterprises	Chevrolet	Magnum Contracting, Inc.
42	Carson Hocevar (R)	Niece Motorsports	Chevrolet	GM Parts Now, Scott's
44	James Buescher	Niece Motorsports	Chevrolet	GR Energy Services, FHE FracLock
45	Brett Moffitt	Niece Motorsports	Chevrolet	Circle B Diecast
49	Ray Ciccarelli	CMI Motorsports	Chevrolet	Ciccarelli Moving & Installations
51	Drew Dollar	Kyle Busch Motorsports	Toyota	JBL
52	Stewart Friesen	Halmar Friesen Racing	Toyota	Halmar
56	Gus Dean	Hill Motorsports	Chevrolet	Hill Motorsports
68	Clay Greenfield	Clay Greenfield Motorsports	Toyota	Rackley Roofing
75	Parker Kligerman	Henderson Motorsports	Chevrolet	Food Country USA, Tide
83	Tim Viens	CMI Motorsports	Chevrolet	Boat Gadget
88	Matt Crafton	ThorSport Racing	Toyota	Menards, Mold Armor
96	Todd Peck	Peck Motorsports	Chevrolet	Holla Vodka
98	Grant Enfinger	ThorSport Racing	Toyota	Champion Power Equipment "Powering Your Life"
99	Ben Rhodes	ThorSport Racing	Toyota	Bombardier Learjet 75

== Practice ==
Chandler Smith was the fastest in the practice session with a time of 47.458 seconds and a speed of 189.641 mph (305.198 km/h).

Pos	No.	Driver	Team	Manufacturer	Time	Speed
1	18	Chandler Smith (R)	Kyle Busch Motorsports	Toyota	47.458	189.641
2	16	Austin Hill	Hattori Racing Enterprises	Toyota	47.465	189.613
3	13	Johnny Sauter	ThorSport Racing	Toyota	47.477	189.565

== Qualifying ==
Johnny Sauter scored the pole for the race with a time of 49.733 seconds and a speed of 180.966 mph (291.237 km/h).

Tim Viens would not set a time after his car's driveshaft fell off the car as the team was pushing the car onto pit road, causing him to not qualify for the race.

=== Qualifying results ===
Pos	No	Driver	Team	Manufacturer	Time
1	13	Johnny Sauter	ThorSport Racing	Toyota	49.733
2	2	Sheldon Creed	GMS Racing	Chevrolet	49.920
3	98	Grant Enfinger	ThorSport Racing	Toyota	50.012
4	23	Chase Purdy (R)	GMS Racing	Chevrolet	50.015
5	24	Raphaël Lessard	GMS Racing	Chevrolet	50.069
6	18	Chandler Smith (R)	Kyle Busch Motorsports	Toyota	50.099
7	4	John Hunter Nemechek	Kyle Busch Motorsports	Toyota	50.183
8	21	Zane Smith	GMS Racing	Chevrolet	50.204
9	1	Hailie Deegan (R)	David Gilliland Racing	Ford	50.214
10	25	Timothy Peters	Rackley WAR	Chevrolet	50.296
11	26	Tyler Ankrum	GMS Racing	Chevrolet	50.301
12	42	Carson Hocevar (R)	Niece Motorsports	Chevrolet	50.308
13	17	David Gilliland	David Gilliland Racing	Ford	50.308
14	88	Matt Crafton	ThorSport Racing	Toyota	50.333
15	45	Brett Moffitt	Niece Motorsports	Chevrolet	50.355
16	10	Jennifer Jo Cobb	Jennifer Jo Cobb Racing	Chevrolet	50.371
17	51	Drew Dollar	Kyle Busch Motorsports	Toyota	50.388
18	16	Austin Hill	Hattori Racing Enterprises	Toyota	50.447
19	22	Austin Wayne Self	AM Racing	Chevrolet	50.491
20	3	Jordan Anderson (i)	Jordan Anderson Racing	Chevrolet	50.504
21	38	Todd Gilliland	Front Row Motorsports	Ford	50.536
22	15	Tanner Gray	David Gilliland Racing	Ford	50.536
23	99	Ben Rhodes	ThorSport Racing	Toyota	50.610
24	20	Spencer Boyd	Young's Motorsports	Chevrolet	50.668
25	40	Ryan Truex	Niece Motorsports	Chevrolet	50.687
26	9	Codie Rohrbaugh	CR7 Motorsports	Chevrolet	50.707
27	02	Kris Wright (R)	Young's Motorsports	Chevrolet	50.748
28	28	Bryan Dauzat	FDNY Racing	Chevrolet	50.778
29	52	Stewart Friesen	Halmar Friesen Racing	Toyota	50.794
30	12	Tate Fogleman	Young's Motorsports	Chevrolet	50.856
31	04	Cory Roper	Roper Racing	Ford	50.864
32	30	Danny Bohn	On Point Motorsports	Toyota	50.881
33	19	Derek Kraus	McAnally-Hilgemann Racing	Toyota	51.153
34	56	Gus Dean	Hill Motorsports	Chevrolet	51.191
35	33	Jason White	Reaume Brothers Racing	Chevrolet	51.733
36	44	James Buescher	Niece Motorsports	Chevrolet	0.000
Failed to qualify
37	75	Parker Kligerman	Henderson Motorsports	Chevrolet	50.932
38	8	Joe Nemechek	NEMCO Motorsports	Ford	51.156
39	96	Todd Peck	Peck Motorsports	Chevrolet	51.360
40	11	Spencer Davis	Spencer Davis Motorsports	Toyota	51.367
41	41	Dawson Cram	Cram Racing Enterprises	Chevrolet	51.473
42	6	Norm Benning	Norm Benning Racing	Chevrolet	51.948
43	34	Jesse Iwuji	Reaume Brothers Racing	Toyota	52.273
44	49	Ray Ciccarelli	CMI Motorsports	Chevrolet	52.284
45	68	Clay Greenfield	Clay Greenfield Motorsports	Toyota	0.000
46	83	Tim Viens	CMI Motorsports	Chevrolet	0.000

== Race ==
=== Race results ===
==== Stage Results ====
Stage One Laps: 21

Pos	No	Driver	Team	Manufacturer	Points
1	24	Raphaël Lessard	GMS Racing	Chevrolet	10
2	2	Sheldon Creed	GMS Racing	Chevrolet	9
3	98	Grant Enfinger	ThorSport Racing	Toyota	8
4	4	John Hunter Nemechek	Kyle Busch Motorsports	Toyota	7
5	13	Johnny Sauter	ThorSport Racing	Toyota	6
6	99	Ben Rhodes	ThorSport Racing	Toyota	5
7	18	Chandler Smith (R)	Kyle Busch Motorsports	Toyota	4
8	17	David Gilliland	David Gilliland Racing	Ford	3
9	52	Stewart Friesen	Halmar Friesen Racing	Toyota	2
10	25	Timothy Peters	Rackley WAR	Chevrolet	1

Stage Two Laps: 25

Pos	No	Driver	Team	Manufacturer	Points
1	4	John Hunter Nemechek	Kyle Busch Motorsports	Toyota	10
2	24	Raphaël Lessard	GMS Racing	Chevrolet	9
3	13	Johnny Sauter	ThorSport Racing	Toyota	8
4	2	Sheldon Creed	GMS Racing	Chevrolet	7
5	99	Ben Rhodes	ThorSport Racing	Toyota	6
6	18	Chandler Smith (R)	Kyle Busch Motorsports	Toyota	5
7	16	Austin Hill	Hattori Racing Enterprises	Toyota	4
8	25	Timothy Peters	Rackley WAR	Chevrolet	3
9	98	Grant Enfinger	ThorSport Racing	Toyota	2
10	26	Tyler Ankrum	GMS Racing	Chevrolet	1

=== Final Stage Results ===
Laps: 61

Pos	Grid	No	Driver	Team	Manufacturer	Laps	Points
1	23	99	Ben Rhodes	ThorSport Racing	Toyota	101	51
2	20	3	Jordan Anderson (i)	Jordan Anderson Racing	Chevrolet	101	0
3	31	04	Cory Roper	Roper Racing	Ford	101	34
4	25	40	Ryan Truex	Niece Motorsports	Chevrolet	101	33
5	12	42	Carson Hocevar (R)	Niece Motorsports	Chevrolet	101	32
6	2	2	Sheldon Creed	GMS Racing	Chevrolet	101	47
7	7	4	John Hunter Nemechek	Kyle Busch Motorsports	Toyota	101	47
8	26	9	Codie Rohrbaugh	CR7 Motorsports	Chevrolet	101	29
9	6	18	Chandler Smith (R)	Kyle Busch Motorsports	Toyota	101	37
10	17	51	Drew Dollar	Kyle Busch Motorsports	Toyota	101	27
11	3	98	Grant Enfinger	ThorSport Racing	Toyota	101	36
12	27	02	Kris Wright (R)	Young's Motorsports	Chevrolet	101	25
13	24	20	Spencer Boyd	Young's Motorsports	Chevrolet	101	24
14	13	17	David Gilliland	David Gilliland Racing	Ford	101	26
15	14	88	Matt Crafton	ThorSport Racing	Toyota	101	22
16	8	21	Zane Smith	GMS Racing	Chevrolet	101	21
17	32	30	Danny Bohn	On Point Motorsports	Toyota	101	20
18	16	10	Jennifer Jo Cobb	Jennifer Jo Cobb Racing	Chevrolet	101	19
19	28	28	Bryan Dauzat	FDNY Racing	Chevrolet	101	18
20	35	33	Jason White	Reaume Brothers Racing	Chevrolet	101	17
21	19	22	Austin Wayne Self	AM Racing	Chevrolet	100	16
22	18	16	Austin Hill	Hattori Racing Enterprises	Toyota	99	19
23	5	24	Raphaël Lessard	GMS Racing	Chevrolet	99	33
24	9	1	Hailie Deegan (R)	David Gilliland Racing	Ford	98	13
25	15	45	Brett Moffitt	Niece Motorsports	Chevrolet	96	12
26	10	25	Timothy Peters	Rackley WAR	Chevrolet	95	15
27	1	13	Johnny Sauter	ThorSport Racing	Toyota	94	24
28	11	26	Tyler Ankrum	GMS Racing	Chevrolet	94	10
29	4	23	Chase Purdy (R)	GMS Racing	Chevrolet	91	8
30	30	12	Tate Fogleman	Young's Motorsports	Chevrolet	73	7
31	21	38	Todd Gilliland	Front Row Motorsports	Ford	71	6
32	29	52	Stewart Friesen	Halmar Friesen Racing	Toyota	71	7
33	33	19	Derek Kraus	McAnally-Hilgemann Racing	Toyota	56	4
34	34	56	Gus Dean	Hill Motorsports	Chevrolet	1	3
35	22	15	Tanner Gray	David Gilliland Racing	Ford	0	2
36	36	44	James Buescher	Niece Motorsports	Chevrolet	0	1

Previous race: 2020 Lucas Oil 150	NASCAR Camping World Truck Series; 2021 season	Next race: 2021 BrakeBest Brake Pads 159
