= Norman Yeung =

Canadian actor, writer, filmmaker and artist

Norman Yeung is a Canadian actor, writer, filmmaker and artist.

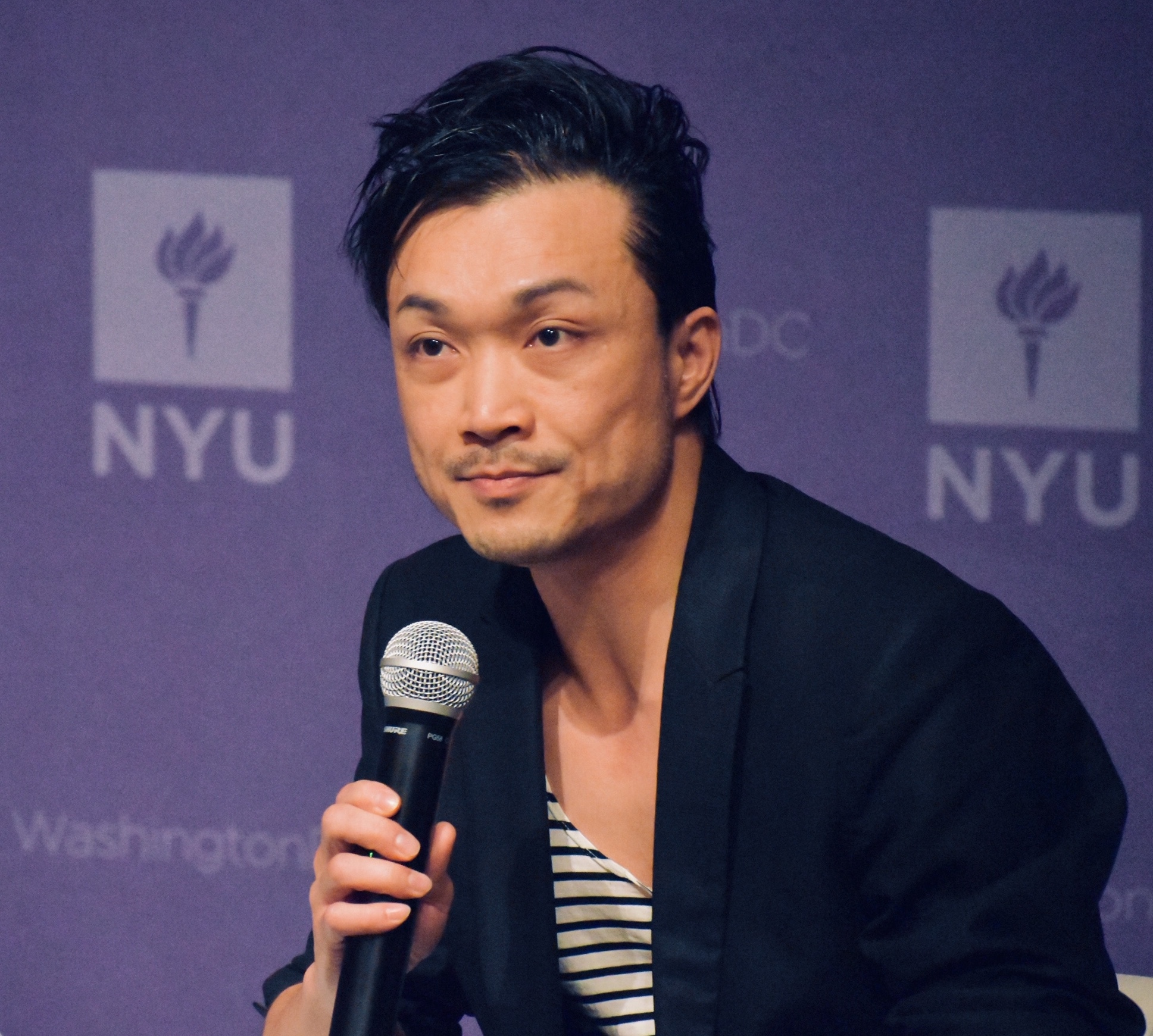
Norman Yeung speaking at NYU event

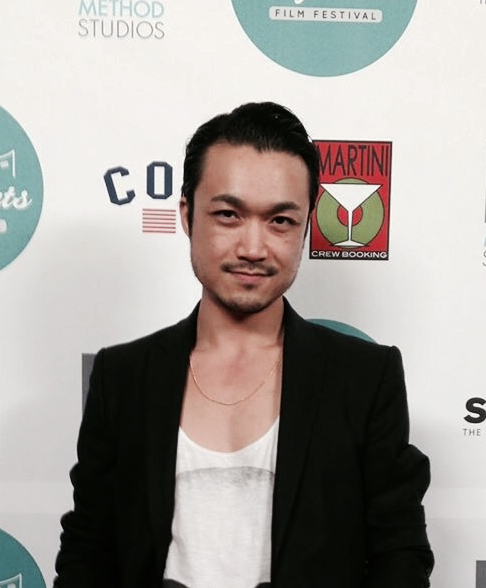
Norman Yeung at film festival premiere, TCL Chinese Theatre, Hollywood.

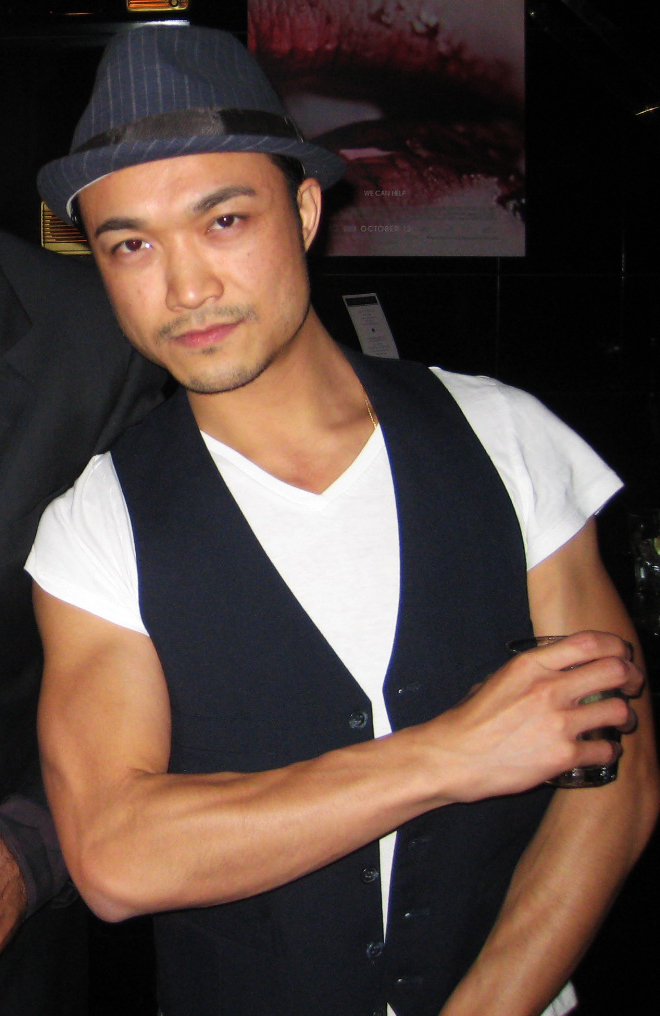
Norman Yeung at Toronto International Film Festival 2012 event.

== Acting ==
Yeung played the role of Kim Yong in Resident Evil: Afterlife, alongside Milla Jovovich, Ali Larter, Wentworth Miller, Boris Kodjoe and Kim Coates. The fourth installment in the Resident Evil film franchise, Resident Evil: Afterlife dominated the international box office for four weeks upon release in September, 2010, and remains the most commercially successful film of the franchise to date, having grossed $300,228,084. He describes his character Kim Yong as "simply human" and "a point of access for the audience.".

Yeung played the role of Eddie the Metal Dude in Todd and the Book of Pure Evil, appearing in 21 episodes as a Satanic agent provocateur to Todd (Alex House) and nemesis to Jimmy the Janitor (Jason Mewes). He describes his character Eddie as "a badass with luxurious hair who wants nothing but destruction." He reprised his role of Eddie in the animated feature film Todd and the Book of Pure Evil: The End of the End.

Other film and television roles include a disgruntled laborer in Frankie Drake Mysteries, an irresponsible aide in Murdoch Mysteries, a conniving gang leader in Rookie Blue, a guilt-ridden drama student in King, and a VJ in The Tracey Fragments, directed by Bruce McDonald and starring Elliot Page.

Yeung played the roles of Young Zhang Lin and Benny in Chimerica, a co-production between Royal Manitoba Theatre Centre and Canadian Stage (January - April 2016). This production, directed by Chris Abraham, was the Canadian premiere of the Olivier Award-winning play by Lucy Kirkwood.

Yeung played the role of Hassan in The Kite Runner, a co-production between Theatre Calgary and Citadel Theatre (January - March 2013). This production, directed by Eric Rose, was the Canadian premiere of the celebrated, international bestseller by Khaled Hosseini, adapted for the stage by Matthew Spangler. This production was a box office and critical success, receiving favorable press including The Globe and Mail, Calgary Herald and Edmonton Journal. Yeung's performance was "[P]articularly notable ... Yeung, as Hassan and then later as Hassans’ son, delivers a powerful, quiet performance..." (Calgary Herald); "...other compelling performances ... Norman Yeung wrenches hearts with his eager, honourable Hassan." (The Globe and Mail); "Conor Wylie and Norman Yeung, both young Vancouver artists, are especially affecting and soulful as young Amir and his best friend Hassan, the son of his father's servant. Their playfulness together, and Hassan's heartbreaking loyalty and stoicism even in the face of his friend's betrayal, linger powerfully in the mind." (Edmonton Journal).

== Writing ==
Yeung's play Theory, about a film professor fighting the online terror of a mysterious student, had its world premiere at Tarragon Theatre in Toronto in 2018, and American premiere at Mosaic Theater in Washington, D.C., in 2019. It was nominated for the Carol Bolt Award in 2019, the Safe Words New Canadian Play Award in 2017, and won First Prize for the Herman Voaden National Playwriting Competition in 2015. Early productions were staged at Rumble Theatre's Tremors Festival in 2018, Alumnae Theatre's FireWorks Series in 2013, and SummerWorks Festival in 2010, where it received the National Theatre School of Canada/SummerWorks Award for Design (Camellia Koo). Theory is available as a podcast on CBC/PlayME and a book from Playwrights Canada Press.

Referring to hypocrisy found at every point of the political spectrum, Yeung has said: "That Theory has gained urgency and relevance since I wrote the first draft in 2009 is uncanny and alarming."

Critics have said: "The play is admirably ambitious as it works through layers of complexity … It’s a tribute to the sophistication of many of the ideas in this play that I still can’t make up my mind about the initial question I posed. [What would Jordan Peterson say about this play?] … Please, readers, go along and judge for yourselves, and maybe bring someone with opposite values to your own with you. Let the debate begin. …3/4 stars" (The Toronto Star); "Theory is one of the most intelligently provocative plays one is likely to see this season. It will resonate with anyone who has ever had to question their own allegiances and discomfort those who are too certain of themselves." (Washington City Paper); "[An] invigorating drama of critical ideas that replays in the mind the next day the way a catchy tune gets stuck in one’s head." (DC Metro Theater Arts); "A Truly Provocative Internet Thriller … a must-see for anyone who’s ever had an internet-induced panic attack. … masterfully tackles power dynamics, privilege, bias, and the tension between freedom of speech and oppression. … The plot builds toward a heart-racing climax … prepare for a heated discussion, because Theory gets an A for stimulating difficult but important conversation." (DCist); "Theory punches up hard with its social commentary. … This is one of the most exciting shows on stage right now..." (Mooney on Theatre); “Theory pulls no punches in exploring the dubious parameters of art and communication ... Norman Yeung’s aggressively intellectual script ... promises to fuel animated discussions long after you’ve left the theatre.” (Torontoist).

His play Deirdre Dear premiered at the Neil LaBute New Theatre Festival in 2015 in St. Louis, Missouri, presented alongside the premiere of LaBute's "Kandahar".

His first full-length play Pu-Erh, about how language unites and divides an immigrant family, premiered at Theatre Passe Muraille in Toronto in 2010. It was nominated for four Dora Mavor Moore Awards, including Outstanding New Play. It was also a finalist for the Herman Voaden National Playwriting Competition in 2009.

His play Lichtenstein's an 8: A New Formula to Quantify Artistic Quality, about the intersections between art and science, was presented at Buddies in Bad Times' Rhubarb Festival in Toronto in 2008.

His post-apocalyptic opera Black Blood (Norman Yeung, librettist; Christiaan Venter, composer), about victims in a war over resources, premiered at Tapestry New Opera Showcase in Toronto in 2012.

Yeung has been a member of the Stratford Festival Playwrights Retreat, fu-GEN Theatre Company's Kitchen Playwrights Unit, Canadian Stage's BASH! Artist Development Program, and Tapestry New Opera's Librettist-Composer Laboratory (LibLab).

== Filmmaking ==
Yeung has written and directed short films that include Anne Darling, Marnie Love, Hello Faye, and Light 01. His films have screened at international film festivals including Calgary International Film Festival, Toronto Reel Asian International Film Festival, The Los Angeles International Short Film Festival, on Movieola Channel, Mini Movie International Channel (Europe), and on Air Canada. He was Second Unit Director on The Tracey Fragments, directed by Bruce McDonald and starring Elliot Page.

== Visual arts ==
Yeung has exhibited his paintings and drawings in such venues as Art Gallery of Ontario, Art Gallery of Mississauga, Flying Rooster Contemporary Projects (Montreal), Milk Glass (Toronto), Board of Directors (Toronto), and curcioprojects (New York City). His painting and illustration clients include LVMH, Bruce Mau Design (BMD), National Film Board of Canada, MTV, CBC, and many more. As a visual artist, he was featured on CBC Radio 3's "MAKE: Next Generation Canadian Creators", CBC's ZeD TV, MuchMusic, MTV, and in numerous publications and documentaries.

== Cultural activism ==
Yeung's cultural concerns as a Chinese Canadian actor and artist are explored in the book Voices Rising: Asian Canadian Cultural Activism by Xiaoping Li. (ISBN 9780774812214)

He has been a playwriting mentor at Paprika Festival (Toronto), lectured at Central Technical School about urban art and at Lord Byng Secondary School about a career in the arts, spoken at The Humanitas Festival (Toronto) about responsible casting of minorities in media, and received a Toronto Clean and Beautiful City Appreciation Award for his mural work.

== Personal life ==
Yeung received his BFA in Acting from University of British Columbia and his BFA (Honours) in Film Studies from Ryerson University.

He was born in Guangzhou, China and grew up in Vancouver, British Columbia, Canada.

He lives in Los Angeles and Toronto.

== Filmography ==
=== Film ===
Year	Title	Role	Notes
2007	The Tracey Fragments	VJ	
2010	Resident Evil: Afterlife	Kim Yong	
2016	Anne Darling	Daniel	Short film, also writer/director
2017	Filth City	Young Triad	Also released in episodic form
2017	Todd and the Book of Pure Evil: The End of the End	Eddie (voice)	Animated feature film
2020	Alone Wolf	Mike	
2023	Hamlet	Rosencrantz	

=== Television ===
Year	Title	Role	Notes
2003	Rockpoint P.D.	Urumqi	
2011	Rookie Blue	Tommy Chan	1 episode: s02e09 "Brotherhood"
2010–2012	Todd and the Book of Pure Evil	Eddie	Recurring
2012	Guidestones	Ryerson Student	
2012	King	Darren Choy	1 episode: s02e12 "Aurora O'Donnell"
2014	Murdoch Mysteries	Taster	1 episode: s07e16 "Kung Fu Crabtree"
2019	Frankie Drake Mysteries	Lu Zhang	1 episode: s03e04 "A Brother in Arms"
