= Matt Austin (actor) =

Canadian actor, musician and writer (born 1978)

- Born: Matthew Sadowski; 20 April 1978 (age 48); Toronto, Ontario, Canada
- Occupations: Actor, writer, musician
- Years active: 2000-2014, 2024-present
- Children: 2

Matt Austin (born Matthew Sadowski; 20 April 1978) is a Canadian actor, best known for his role as Bridge Carson, the Green Ranger (later Blue Ranger then Red) from the children's television series Power Rangers S.P.D.. He returned in 2007 as the Red Ranger in the Power Rangers Operation Overdrive "Once a Ranger" 15th anniversary team-up two-part episode. In addition to acting, he is also a writer, musician, and filmmaker.

== Life and career ==
Austin communicates frequently with the Power Rangers fanbase, and was a guest at Power Morphicon in June 2007, where he interviewed guests and shot footage of the interviews with his own camera. Recently, he revealed plans to make a documentary on the Power Rangers fandom called MOR-FAN-ONIMAL. However, according to his Twitter account, production has ceased due to the funding not being put together.

Austin's "Power Rangers" character, Bridge, displays a particular fondness for buttered toast in one episode. He does so by uttering the word "buttery" and involuntarily wiggles the fingers on his right hand. This reference stems from Austin's own fondness for Indian butter chicken. His character also wears gloves on his hands due to his inability to control his powers, though in reality, the gloves are used to conceal the tattoo that Matt has on his hands

Canada's Alliance Releasing has picked up worldwide rights to Don't You Forget About Me, a 75-minute documentary centered on late filmmaker John Hughes starring and directed by Austin. It chronicles Austin's recent road trip to the suburbs of Illinois, where he attempted to track down Hughes, who at that point had not written or directed a movie in more than a decade. The project features interviews with Ally Sheedy, Judd Nelson, Mia Sara, Kelly Le Brock and Andrew McCarthy.

Austin was born in Toronto, Ontario, Canada. He is Jewish. Austin was diagnosed with attention deficit hyperactivity disorder as an adult and has a benign brain tumor.

Austin returned to acting after 13 years, starring in the comedy F'ED, by writer/director Tyler Boyco.

== Filmography ==
Film
Year	Title	Role	Notes
2000	Coming to Terms	Damian	Short film
2000	Broke Body Saints	Malcolm	
2001	Jackie, Ethel, Joan: The Women of Camelot	Joseph Patrick Kennedy II	Television film
2002	Release	Young man	Short film; also writer
2002	Talk Salò	Aaron	Short film
2002	If Wishes Were Horses	Toby	Also second assistant director
2003	Autobiography of an Insect	Alex	Short film
2003	Will	Matthew	Short film
2003	Bar Life	Guy	Short film
2004	Dawn of the Dead	EMS technician	
2004	Denied	Merrick	
2004	Credit Role	Himself	Short film; also producer and writer
2004	A Separate Peace	Rach	Television film
2004	This Town's Called Crash	Mark	Short film; also writer
2006	Catch and Release	Charlie Potter	Short film
2008	Time Bomb	Kid	
2009	Don't You Forget About Me		Director and writer
2014	Pretend We're Kissing		Director, producer and writer
2024	F'ED	Eddie	

Television
Year	Title	Role	Notes
2002	Spynet	Cypher	2 episodes
2003	Queer as Folk	Hustler	Episode: "Hunt(er) for Love"
2005	Power Rangers S.P.D.	Bridge Carson/Green S.P.D. Ranger	Main role; 38 episodes
2006	This Is Wonderland	Daniel McDonald	Season 3, episode 13
2007	Power Rangers Operation Overdrive	Bridge Carson/Red S.P.D. Ranger	2 episodes
2008	Taste Buds	Matt	Host (season 1); 13 episodes
2010	Aaron Stone	Secret service agent	Episode: "Mutant Rain (Part 2)"
