= Mike McPhaden =

Mike McPhaden (born February 9, 1972) is a Canadian actor, playwright and television writer and producer, most noted for his work on the television series Corner Gas Animated and Jann.

== Theatre career ==
Originally from Winnipeg, Manitoba, he began his career doing sketch and improvisational comedy with the Higher Than the Ground comedy troupe, and began to have stage acting roles in the late 1990s, later branching out into writing with his stage play Poochwater premiering at the 2000 SummerWorks theatre festival. The play was inspired in part by rummaging through his grandfather's possessions after the older man's death, and discovering a stash of old electronics textbooks from his grandfather's service as a radio operator during World War II. He returned to SummerWorks the following year both with his own play, Flight 198, and as an actor in Shawne McKeown and Marilo Nuez's play North East Side Story.

After Poochwater received a followup staging at Theatre Passe Muraille in 2002, McPhaden won two Dora Mavor Moore awards in 2003, for Outstanding New Play, Independent Theatre and Best Leading Actor, Independent Theatre. The play received another follow-up production at Passe Muraille in 2005 due to its popularity.

He also received a nomination for Best Original Play, General Theatre in 2007 for Noble Parasites, and a second nomination in the independent theatre category in 2009 for The Gladstone Variations, a collaboration with Brendan Gall, Rick Roberts and Julie Tepperman.

== Television work ==
After noting as early as 2005 that his Dora award for writing Poochwater had opened far more professional doors for him than his award for acting in it did, he enrolled in the television writing program at the Canadian Film Centre in the 2006-07 cohort, and had his first television writing credits on the series Taste Buds. He is now associated principally with television writing and production, although he has continued to appear in occasional guest acting roles.

As a television writer he was a Canadian Comedy Award nominee for Best Writing in a Television Series at the 12th Canadian Comedy Awards for his work on the writing team for Men with Brooms, a WGC Screenwriting Award nominee in 2018 for Bruno & Boots: This Can’t Be Happening at Macdonald Hall and in 2020 for Jann, and a Canadian Screen Award nominee as a producer of Jann at the 10th Canadian Screen Awards in 2022.

== Personal life ==
He is married to actress Christine Horne.
