= Pig Girl =

Play by Colleen Murphy

Pig Girl, first produced in November 2013 and then published in November 2015, is a play by Colleen Murphy that draws upon the events of the 2007 Pickton case surrounding the murders of Indigenous women by Port Coquitlam pig farmer Robert Pickton. The play tells the stories of the fictionalized characters Dying Girl, Killer, Sister, and Police Officer in order to illuminate the Canadian issue of missing and murdered Indigenous women. Pig Girl was awarded both a Carol Bolt Award and a Governor General's Award.

== Title and plot ==
As opposed to narratives that concentrate on the victimization of murdered Indigenous women, Murphy aimed to portray their voices, heroism, and resistance, along with their societal marginalization. The play's title, Pig Girl, is described by the author as ironic and provocative, as the murdered women were treated like animals.

Set in the barn of the pig farm, each of Pig Girl’s four fictionalized characters — The Dying Woman, The Killer, The Cop and The Sister — describe their perspectives and experiences of the events inspired by the Robert Pickton case. The play is simultaneously set within two different temporalities. In one, The Cop and Sister reflectively respond to the missing Girl - Sister spends her life looking for her missing sibling and convincing the dismissive cop to do the same, and the Cop, who is “caught within a justice system that has made him apathetic and narrow-minded,” comes to understand that his doings were wrong. Meanwhile, in the second temporal frame, the characters Girl and Killer instead illuminate the brutalization and violence against Girl in real time. The two parallel temporalities reflect Murphy's aim to capture a sense of feeling and emotional immediacy in her audience. As the Montreal Gazette writes, “Essentially, the Dying Woman (as she’s called) is protractedly slaughtered throughout the play’s gruelling 90 minutes. How can an audience be expected to stomach this? One answer is that it can’t, and that’s partly the play’s point.”

== Allusions ==
=== Robert Pickton Case ===
Murphy's play alludes to British Columbia's Robert Pickton case after he was arrested in 2002 for the genetic and physical remains of 33 missing women (mostly Indigenous) on his pig farm. In particular, Pig Girl was inspired by the court trial's decision to not indict the 20 other murder charges related to Pickton, when he was only convicted for the deaths of 6 women.

== Productions ==
=== Edmonton Theatre Network ===
Pig Girl was first performed at Edmonton's Theatre Network from November 5 to 24 in 2013. The cast consisted of all non-Indigenous performers. The Edmonton production also emphasizes the physical violence of Pig Girl, displaying staged rape, murder and abuse.

=== Imago Theatre ===
A Quebec-based company that focuses on women's stories and plays, the Imago Theatre's production of Pig Girl in February 2016 was the first Canadian staging of the play since the Edmonton Theatre Network's staging. In response to the play's previous criticisms, director Micheline Chevrier restaged the violent scenes in an attempt to focus on the characters rather than the violence itself. Talkbacks were held after each performance, and audiences paid for their tickets after the show on a “pay-what-you-decide” basis.

=== Sacred Roots Production ===
Indigenous theatre company Behind The Actors Mask Studio collaborated with Dreamcather's Studio 4 Film and Television and would form Sacred Roots Production preceding the performance of a revised version of Pig Girl originally written by Governor General Award Winning playwright Colleen Murphy. Their version used mainly an all Indigenous cast with the exception of the Killer and Police Officer. Adding more elements of Indigenous culture through ceremony, song, and language to give a greater focus on drawing attention to Missing and Murdered Indigenous Women, warning the vulnerability of alcohol and addictions and vulnerabilites that can lead to human sex trafficking. Jessica Loft Cross (Thompson) brought the project to Shelby Mitchell-Adams in order to come together in a collaborative effort to raise awareness. They signed a contract and were given permission from Colleen Murphy to make the revisions to the play. Director Constantine Kourtedis and Jessica Loft Cross spearheaded the adaptation by changing the structural format of the play breaking it down into scenes between the Sister and the Police Officer, and the Dying Woman and Killer and Jessica added the cultural elements. It changed the rhythm and tempo allowing viewers to take the story in slowly and intimately. The production was performed in 2016 from August 19 to 20 in Akwesasne Mohawk Territory in New York, and from August 26 to 27 in Kahnawake Mohawk Territory in Quebec intended for a Native American Indigenous audience. There were 700 attendees overall and the impact of the play was positively received by those who were in attendance. A talk back session followed the performance. On the first night a viewer in the audience was awestruck learning five minutes into the play that the subject matter was about the Robert Pickton case. She followed up by telling her family connection with a victim of Pickton and sang a woman's warrior song in memory of her beloved cousin.

== Critical reception ==
Keith Barker, a Métis playwright and actor, read the play Pig Girl as something that had to be performed despite the violence portrayed. Even though people raised arguments about Colleen Murphy not being a member of the Indigenous, Barker admits there is a struggle between ownership of one's own stories and trusting others to tell the stories. He ends by stating he believes in the play.

=== Edmonton Theatre Network ===
Edmonton Theatre Network's production of Pig Girl faced much criticism regarding its casting choices and its overall orchestration of the play's plot. Penny Farfan of Theatre Journal, for example, points out the production's “graphic depiction of violence against women and non-Indigenous cast”. She then describes the controversy surrounding the production, including the ethics of Colleen Murphy herself, as a non-Indigenous writer, writing on behalf of the Indigenous victims of the case. Additionally, Lyn Gardner from The Guardian is critical of the play's decision to give voice to the Killer alongside the murdered Girl. She writes, “While Murphy gives a voice to the murdered women she also, rather less successfully and almost certainly unnecessarily, gives one to the killer too.”

==== Indigenous Responses to Edmonton Theatre Network’s production ====
Paula Simons of the Edmonton Journal asks, “Do non-aboriginal artists and authors (and journalists, for that matter) even with the best of intentions, have the right to tell aboriginal stories? Especially the most painful and hurtful ones?” Relatedly, there has been much controversy within Indigenous audiences of Edmonton's Pig Girl production that address what has been called, by the Montreal Gazette, “Murphy’s dramatic exploitation of the real suffering of Indigenous women."

Before the opening night of the production, as reflected by University of Alberta's Women's and Gender Studies Professor and Cree activist Tracy Lee Bear, a group of ten Aboriginal people, including relatives of victims of the Robert Pickton murders, met with the playwright, director, and actors to express their perspectives of the play; specifically, of its “profoundly offensive and disrespectful” visuals, contributing to the “re-traumatization” felt by the families of victims. Bear writes, “Indigenous creations like the play Pig Girl allow the narration of our social realities without any cultural context, thereby continuing to legitimize the dominant colonial discourse and colonial violence against women, particularly Indigenous women."

Other Indigenous activists raised their concerns about the play at the Edmonton Theatre Network's question and answer session with Murphy. Cree activist Tanya Kappo, for example, refused to watch the play because of its racist title, which she claimed was disrespectful not only to the character in the play, but to all Indigenous women. She also pointed out the all-white panel at the play's Q&A session, as well as the non-Indigenous cast of the production.

Metis actor and playwright Bruce Sinclair expressed similar concerns regarding the cast of the production; he asked, “Why should white writers, even well-intentioned ones, feel they had the right to tell his story? And why were we making entertainments out of the suffering of aboriginal women – when for all we knew, a woman could be being tortured in a barn outside Edmonton right now?”

Murphy did not respond to concerns regarding cultural appropriation in her play, whereas artistic director Bradley Moss commented that he would no longer feel comfortable staging plays surrounding Indigenous issues.

=== Imago Theatre ===
Jim Burke from the Montreal Gazette praises the director Micheline Chevrier for the “stylish and considered solution to the problem of depicting violence – especially such recent real-life violence – on the stage without exploiting it.” CBC News comments on the Montreal production as a “wake-up call about violence against women and particularly to violence against aboriginal women." Reneltta Arluk, an Indigenous actress who plays “Dying Woman” in Imago Theatre's production of Pig Girl, says the “epidemic of missing and murdered Indigenous women in this country continues to rise with no national action plan in place. As an Indigenous woman, this terrifies me. Pig Girl calls for action by creating this glaring microscope facing us to care. Care about the sister, care about the mother and most importantly care for Dying Woman who endures to speak. To be heard." Reneltta also explains Imago's differences from the Edmonton production, saying they “took the gratuitous out of it so you could hear the necessary”. Their production opted to separate the characters and the violence rather than having them interact and commit violence towards one another. She supports this decision by stating it is a way of making the violence more impressionistic.

=== Sacred Roots Production ===
The Sacred Roots production of Pig Girl was received more positively by audiences. Family members of the victims in the Robert Pickton case thanked the cast for their performance. Jessica Loft Cross (Thompson) and Shelby Mitchell-Adams, former owners of the company and members of the Akwesasne Mohawk, described the cathartic effects of the play, mentioning how “several community members talked about personal and family experiences.” Audience members were also said to resonate with the pain shown in the performance.

== See also ==
- Cultural appropriation
- Highway of Tears murders
- Missing and Murdered Indigenous Women
