= Ava Roth =

Canadian artist

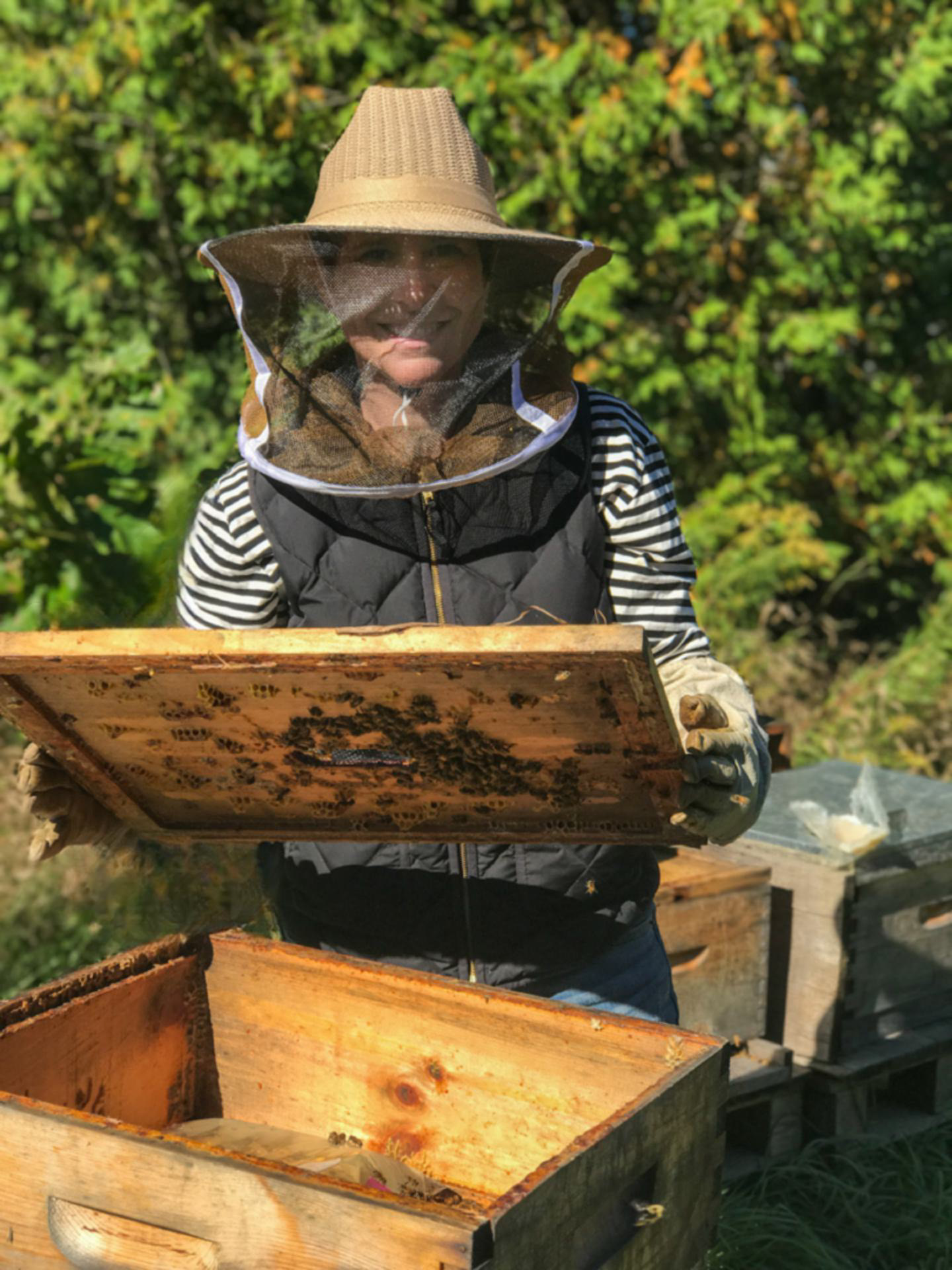
- Occupation: Artist
- Spouse: Anton Piatigorsky
- Writing career
- Period: 2000s-present

Ava Roth is a contemporary Canadian artist based in Toronto, Ontario. Her work ranges from encaustic painting to embroidery to weaving, often combining multiple artistic media into a single piece of art. Her "Honeycomb Collection" series combines framed embroidery and other natural and man-made objects, with natural honeycomb. To create this ongoing series, Roth places objects and art-pieces into beehives located throughout southern Ontario. In the hives, the bees construct honeycomb around them. The artworks produced are thus the result of interspecies collaboration. According to Roth, her work is "fundamentally about exploring the relationship between humans and the natural environment."

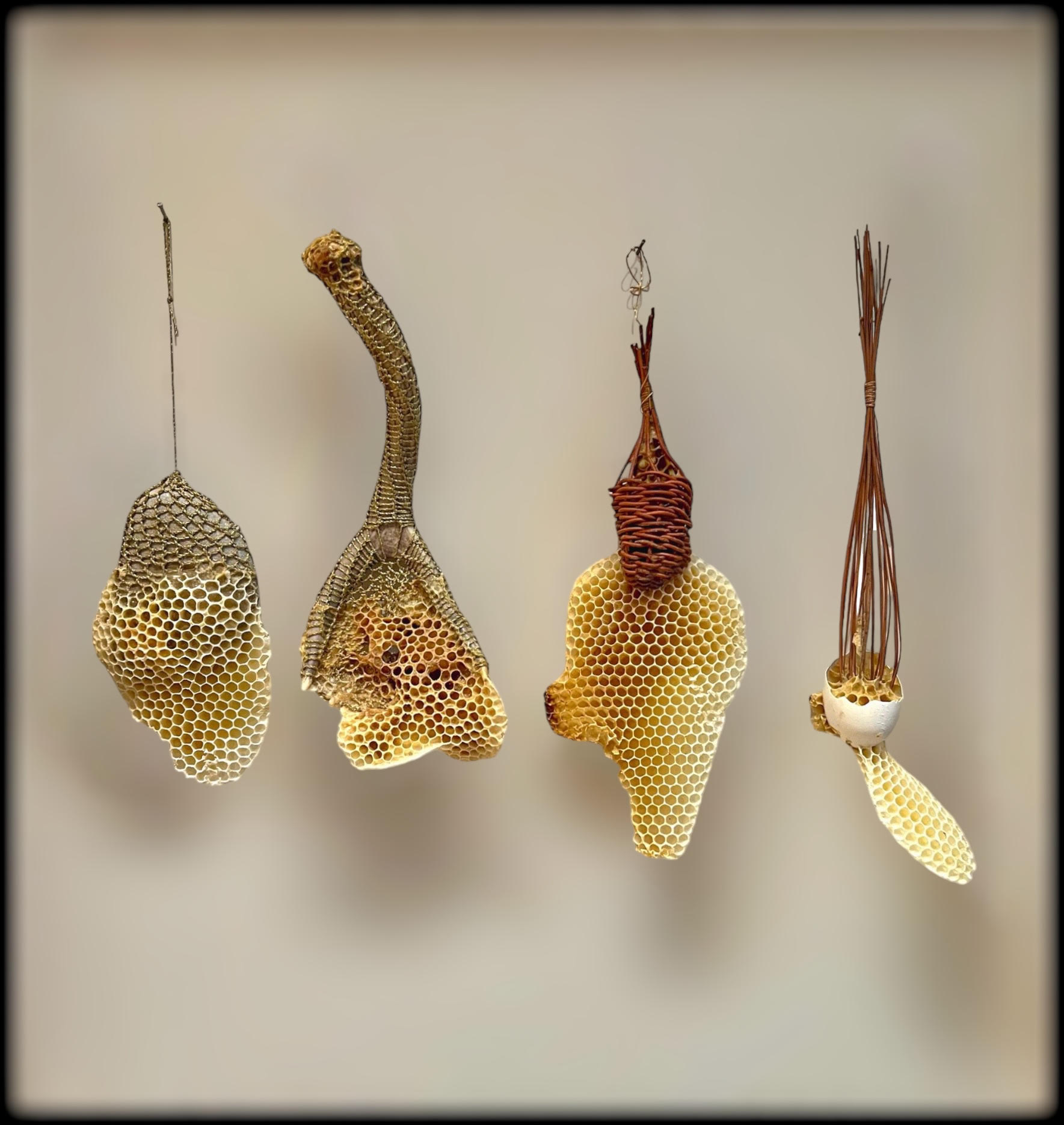
Art from Roth's Honeycomb Series.

Roth's work has been exhibited in many galleries across Ontario, including the Art Gallery of Mississauga, the Orillia Museum of Art and History, the Propeller Gallery in Toronto, and the Wall Space Gallery in Ottawa. Her work has also been exhibited in the United States at the California Nature Art Museum in Solvang, California, the Museum of Encaustic Art in Santa Fe, New Mexico, and Site:Brooklyn Gallery in Brooklyn, New York City. Her work was also featured at the "Net Zero" exhibit at the museum at the King Abdulaziz Center for World Culture (Ithra) in Dhahran, Saudi Arabia in 2023.
