= Daniel Krolik =

Canadian actor (born 1977)

Daniel Krolik (born September 8, 1977) is a Canadian actor and playwright. He is most noted for his 2022 Toronto Fringe Festival play Gay for Pay with Blake & Clay, which he cowrote with Curtis Campbell and co-starred in with Jonathan Wilson.

Krolik and Campbell received a Dora Mavor Moore Award nomination for Outstanding Original Play, Independent Theatre in 2023. They returned to the 2023 Fringe Festival with the sequel show Blake and Clay's Gay Agenda.

Krolik was previously a Dora nominee, alongside Colin Asuncion, Hume Baugh, Samson Bonkeabantu Brown, Keith Cole, daniel jelani ellis, Jeff Ho, Michael Hughes, Indrit Kasapi, Eric Morin, G Kyle Shields, Chy Ryan Spain and Geoffrey Whynot, for Outstanding Performance by an Ensemble, Independent Theatre in 2020, for Buddies in Bad Times's production of Brian Francis's Box 4901.

He has also had supporting and guest roles in film and television. Originally from Montreal, Quebec, he is an alumnus of the theatre program at Sheridan College.
