= Matthew MacKenzie =

Canadian playwright and actor

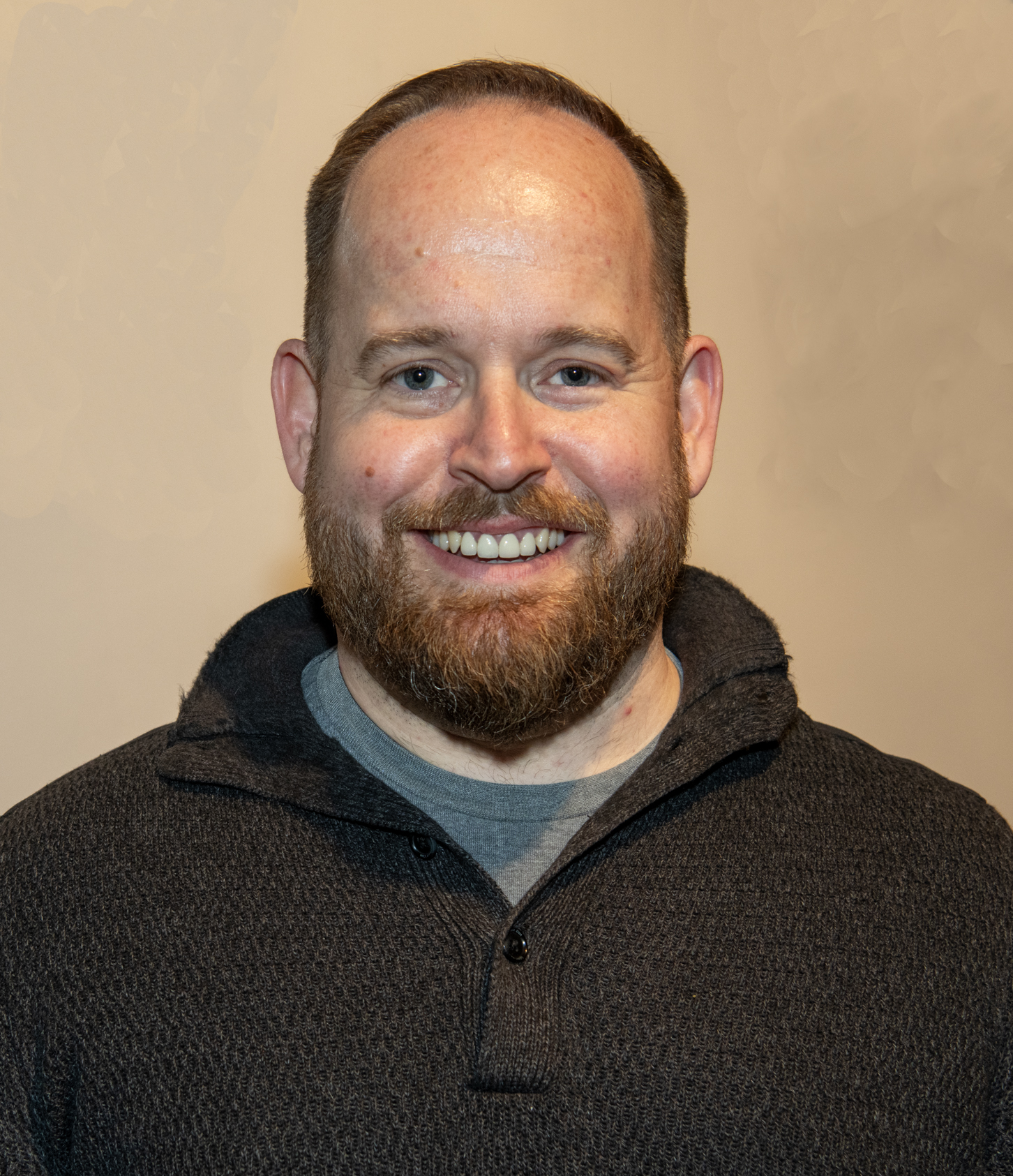
Matthew MacKenzie after his performance in the play "The First Métis Man of Odesa" at Punctuate! Theatre in Toronto

Matthew MacKenzie is a Canadian playwright and actor. He is most noted as a two-time Dora Mavor Moore Award winner for Outstanding New Play, Independent Theatre, winning in 2018 for Bears and in 2023 for The First Métis Man of Odesa.

== Early career ==
A member of the Métis Nation of Alberta from Edmonton, he is a graduate of the playwriting program at the National Theatre School of Canada. His early plays included Tick, Me Happy, The Particulars and In General.

In 2008, he launched his own theatre company, Pyretic Productions, in Edmonton.

His play Sia won the Alberta Playwriting Competition in 2010, and received its premiere production at Toronto's Factory Theatre in 2012.

His play Benefit was staged by Edmonton's Downstage Performance Society in 2014, and won two Elizabeth Sterling Haynes Awards.

== Bears ==
Bears was inspired in part by MacKenzie's discovery of his Métis ancestry, which his family had previously hidden. It centred on Floyd, a Métis man on the run from police after being blamed for an accident at his former workplace, an oil company that had tried to use him as token indigenous support for the construction of an oil pipeline.

Produced by Pyretic, it premiered at Edmonton's PCL Studio Theatre in 2015. It was staged by Toronto's The Theatre Centre in 2018, followed by a production at The Cultch theatre in Vancouver.

The Theatre Centre production won the Dora Awards for both Outstanding New Play and Outstanding Production in the independent division, and the play won the 2018 Carol Bolt Award.

== The First Métis Man of Odesa ==
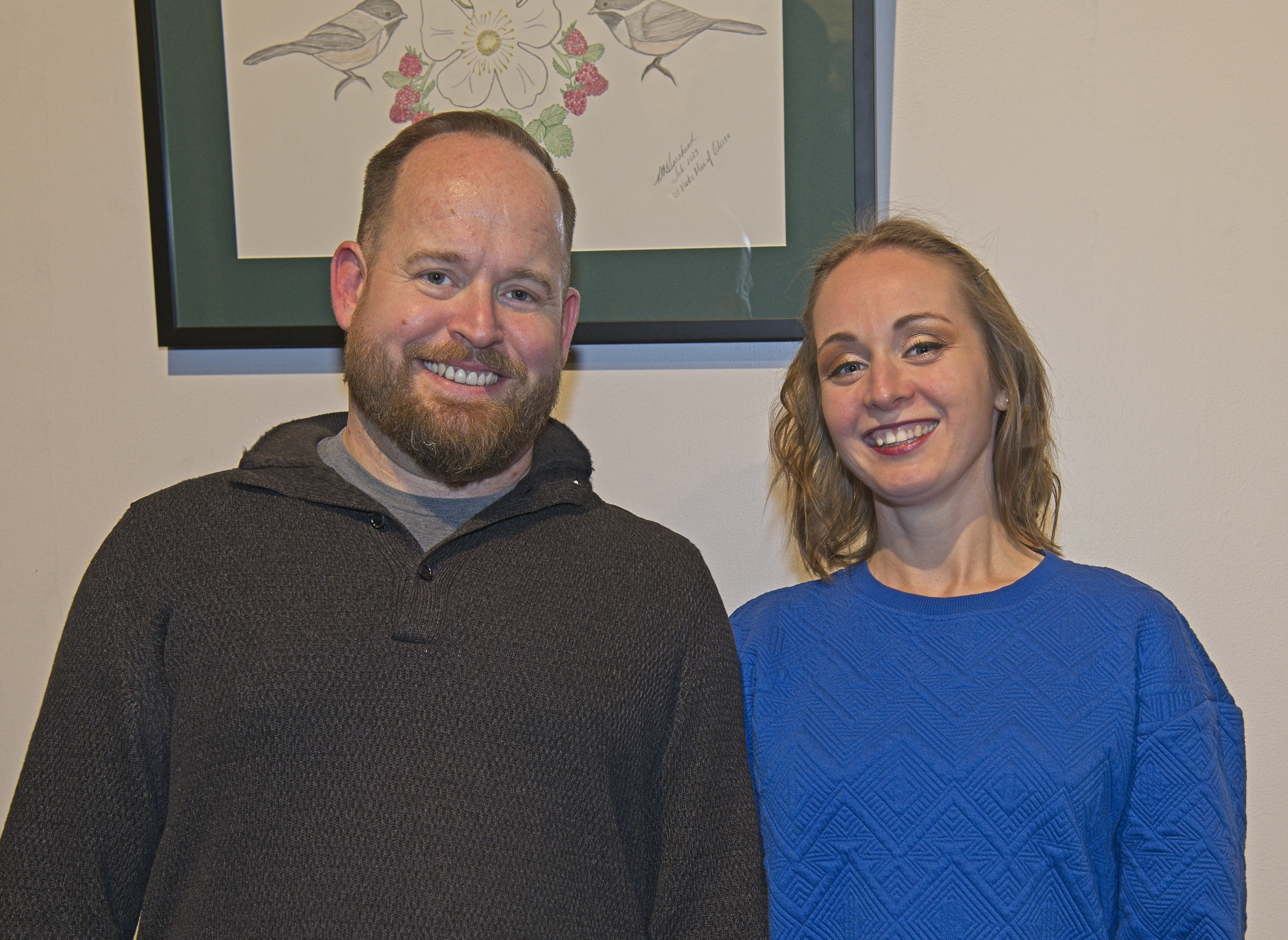
Matthew MacKenzie & Mariya Khomutova in 2023

Following Bears, he premiered the plays The Other, The Bone Wars or The Curse of the Pathological Palaeontologists and Bust. Rust was later reworked as After the Fire, which was a Dora nominee for Outstanding New Play, Independent in 2019.

During this period, he also went on several cultural exchange trips to Ukraine to learn more about the country, during which he met and entered a relationship with Ukrainian actress Mariya Khomutova.

MacKenzie wrote the original version of The First Métis Man of Odesa, which centred on the impact of the COVID-19 pandemic on their plans to marry, on his own, and released it as a short audio drama through Factory Theatre's short drama podcasting platform in 2021. Following the Russian invasion of Ukraine in 2022, Mackenzie and Khomutova worked together to incorporate the impact of that event on their lives, including their efforts to get Khomutova's mother into Canada as a refugee, into an expanded version of the play.

The updated play premiered at The Theatre Centre in March 2023, with Mackenzie and Khomutova jointly credited as writers even though Khomutova had no prior experience as a playwright, and starring in the production together even though MacKenzie had only limited prior experience as an actor. Following its Toronto run, it was taken on a national tour, with engagements in Edmonton, Vancouver, Saskatoon and Winnipeg.
