= Herman Voaden Playwriting Competition =

Literary award presented by Queens University

The Herman Voaden Playwriting Competition is a biennial literary award, presented by Queen's University to plays by Canadian playwrights. The award was created in 1997, funded by a bequest to the university by the late playwright Herman Voaden.

The competition awards a first prize of $3,000 and a second prize of $2,000. In addition to the cash prizes, both the first and second prize winners receive workshop productions of their play at the Thousand Islands Playhouse. Honourable mentions are also given.

== Winners ==
Year	Playwright	Play	Result	Ref.
1997	Brian Drader	The Norbals	Winner	
1997	Richard Sanger	Two Words for Snow	Second Prize	
1997	Hiro Kanagawa	Slants	Third Prize	
1999	Greg Nelson	North	Winner	
1999	Robert Fothergill	Borderline	Second Prize	
1999	Michael MacLennan	The Shooting Stage	Third Prize	
2001	Michael MacLennan	Last Romantics	Winner	
2001	Kent Stetson	New Arcadia	Second Prize	
2001	Sharon Cavanagh	Mr. Outplacement	Third Prize	
2003	Jason Hall	Eyes Catch Fire	Winner	
2003	Laurie Fyffe	The Malaysia Hotel	Second Prize	
2005	Florence Gibson MacDonald	Missing	Winner	
2005	Emma C. Roberts	Excellence, Ontario	Second Prize	
2007	Charlotte Corbeil-Coleman	Scratch	Winner	
2007	Kevin Loring	Where the Blood Mixes	Second Prize	
2009	David Egan	Tom's-a-Cold	Winner	
2009	Donna-Michelle St. Bernard	Gas Girls	Second Prize	
2011	David James Brock	Wet	Winner	
2011	David Egan	Yuri Gagarin Dreams of God	Second Prize	
2013	Jordan Tannahill	Late Company	Winner	
2013	Jessica Moss	Next to Him	Second Prize	
2015	Norman Yeung	Theory	Winner	
2015	Len Falkenstein	Lac/Athabasca	Second Prize	
2017	Michael Kras	The Team	Winner	
2017	Brian Drader	Happy	Second Prize	
2019	Damian Tarnopolsky	The Defence	Winner	
2019	Marc-André Blanchard	The Brothers Gentle	Second Prize	
2021	Jennifer Walton	Gunplay (After the Gun Goes Off)	Winner	
2021	Zahida Rahemtulla	The Frontliners	Second Prize	
2023	Brandon Zang	Ah Wing and the Automaton Eagle	Winner	
2023	Alexander Steele Zonjic	Community Standards or (Move Fast and Break Things)	Second Prize	
