= Kent Stetson =

Canadian playwright and novelist (born 1948)

Kent Stetson CM
- Born: July 5, 1948 (age 78); Marshfield, Prince Edward Island
- Occupations: playwright, novelist
- Writing career
- Period: 1980s–present
- Notable works: Warm Wind in China, As I Am, The Harps of God

Kent Stetson, CM (born July 5, 1948) is a Canadian playwright and novelist.

Stetson is best known for the plays Warm Wind in China (1988), one of the first and most prominent AIDS-themed plays produced in Canada; As I Am (1986), a noted gay-themed work; and the Governor General's Award-winning The Harps of God (1997). His other plays include Queen of the Cadillac (1990), Just Plain Murder (1992), Sweet Magdalena (1994), The Eyes of the Gull (2000), New Arcadia (2001), and Horse High, Bull Strong, Pig Tight (2004). He has also published two novels, The World Above the Sky (2010) and Meat Cove (2013).

The Harps of God received the 2001 Governor General's Literary Award for English language drama, and the 2001 Canadian Authors Association's inaugural Carol Bolt Award. He won the Herman Voaden Playwriting Competition for New Arcadia, the Prince Edward Island Literary Award for outstanding contributions to the literature of Prince Edward Island, and the Wendell Boyle Award for contributions to PEI heritage.

Stetson was appointed to the Order of Canada in July 2007.
