= Mieko Ouchi =

Canadian actress (born 1969)

- Born: 1969 (age 56–57); Canada
- Education: University of Alberta
- Occupations: Actress, director, playwright
- Years active: 1990s–present
- Organization: Concrete Theatre (co-artistic director)
- Known for: Canadian theatre and drama
- Notable work: The Red Priest (Eight Ways to Say Goodbye)
- Awards: Carol Bolt Award (2004); Elizabeth Sterling Haynes Award (2001)

Mieko Ouchi (born 1969) is a Canadian actress, director and playwright. She is most noted for her play The Red Priest (Eight Ways to Say Goodbye), which won the Carol Bolt Award and was shortlisted for the Governor General's Award for English-language drama at the 2004 Governor General's Awards.

A graduate of the theatre program at the University of Alberta, Ouchi is based in Edmonton, Alberta, where she is co-artistic director of the Concrete Theatre company. Her other plays have included The Blue Light, Nisei Blue, The Silver Arrow: The Untold Story of Robin Hood, Decisions, Decisions, By This Parting, The Old Man and the Buddha, I Am For You and Consent. She has also been a stage and film director, including the short films Shepherd's Pie and Sushi, By This Parting and Samurai Swing. In 2001, she won an Elizabeth Sterling Haynes Award for directing a production of José Teodoro's Slowly, An Exchange Is Taking Place. As an actress, in addition to numerous stage roles she starred in Anne Wheeler's film The War Between Us and had a recurring role in the television series The Guard.
