= Jonny Garza Villa =

American author

- Born: Texas, United States
- Writing career
- Notable work: Fifteen Hundred Miles from the Sun (2021); Ander & Santi Were Here (2023); Canto Contigo (2024)
- Notable awards: Jacqueline Woodson Award (2025); Stonewall Book Award (2025)

Jonny Garza Villa is an American author. They are the author of the young adult novels Fifteen Hundred Miles from the Sun (2021), Ander & Santi Were Here (2023), and Canto Contigo (2024), as well as the adult novel Futbolista (2025).

Canto Contigo won the 2025 Jacqueline Woodson Award for LGBTQ+ YA Literature as well as the 2025 Stonewall Young Adult Literature Award.

Jonny Garza Villa was born and raised in Texas.

== Writing ==
Garza Villa published their debut novel, Fifteen Hundred Miles from the Sun, with Skyscape on June 8, 2021. The young adult romance was well received by critics, including starred reviews from Booklist, Kirkus Reviews, and School Library Journal. Kirkus Reviews described Fifteen Hundred Miles from the Sun as "an open-hearted expression of love in its many forms". They named Fifteen Hundred Miles from the Sun one of the best books of 2021. The novel was also a Pura Belpré Award for Young Adult Author honor book.

Garza Villa's second novel, Ander & Santi Were Here, is also a young adult romance novel, published by Wednesday Books on April 4, 2023. Ander & Santi Were Here was well received by critics, including a starred review from Booklist. Kirkus Reviews described the novel as "a relevant coming-of-age journey for patient readers". Among other honors, Ander & Santi Were Here was an honor book for the Stonewall Book Award for Young Adult Literature. The audiobook narrated by Avi Roque was named one of best young adult audiobooks of 2023 by AudioFile.

Canto Contigo, Garza Villa's third novel, is a young adult romance novel, published by Wednesday Books on April 9, 2024. Canto Contigo was well received by critics, including starred reviews from Booklist, Kirkus Reviews, and School Library Journal. Kirkus Reviews described Canto Contigo as "a queer love letter to mariachi music and culture". Canto Contigo won the 2025 Jacqueline Woodson Award, as well as the 2025 Stonewall Book Award for Young Adult Literature. The audiobook narrated by Alejandro Antonio Ruiz was named one of the best young adult audiobooks of 2024 by AudioFile.

Garza Villa's first adult novel, Futbolista, is an erotic romance novel published by Levine Querido in 2025.

== Awards and honors ==
Garza Villa's debut novel, Fifteen Hundred Miles from the Sun, was named one of the best books of 2021 by Kirkus Reviews. The Young Adult Library Services Association also included it on their 2022 list of the Best Fiction for Young Adults.

In 2023, Booklist included Ander & Santi Were Here on their annual list of the "Top 10 Arts Books for Youth", and the audiobook narrated by Avi Roque was named one of year's best young adult audiobooks by AudioFile. The following year, the American Library Association included it on their annual Rainbow List, naming it a top ten title for teen readers, and the Young Adult Library Services Association included it on their list of the Best Fiction for Young Adults.

Canto Contigo was included on Booklist's 2024 list of the "Top 10 Arts Books for Youth". AudioFile also named the audiobook narrated by Alejandro Antonio Ruiz one of the year's best young adult audiobooks. The following year, the American Library Association included the novel on their 2025 Rainbow List, naming it a top ten title for teen readers.

Awards for Garza Villa's work
Year	Title	Award	Result	Ref.
2021	Fifteen Hundred Miles from the Sun	Pura Belpré Award for Young Adult Author	Honor	
2024	Ander & Santi Were Here	Stonewall Book Award for Young Adult Literature	Honor	
2025	Canto Contigo	Jacqueline Woodson Award	Winner	
2025	Canto Contigo	Stonewall Book Award for Young Adult Literature	Winner	

== Publications ==
- Fifteen Hundred Miles from the Sun. Skyscape. 2021. ISBN 978-1-5420-2705-2.
- Canto Contigo. Wednesday Books. 2024. ISBN 978-1-250-87575-4.
- Ander & Santi Were Here. Wednesday Books. 2023. ISBN 978-1-250-84399-9.
- Futbolista. Levine Querido. 2025. ISBN 978-1-646-14509-6.
