= Robert Chafe =

Canadian playwright and actor

- Born: 1971 (age 54–55); Newfoundland and Labrador
- Occupation: playwright
- Writing career
- Period: 2000s–present
- Notable works: Afterimage, Butler's Marsh, Tempting Providence

Robert Chafe (born 1971) is a Canadian playwright and actor based in St. John's. He is the author of seventeen stage scripts and co-author of another eight. His play Afterimage won the Governor General's Award for English language drama at the 2010 Governor General's Awards. He was previously nominated for the same award at the 2004 Governor General's Awards for his plays Butler's Marsh and Tempting Providence. He has worked in theatre, dance, opera, radio, fiction and film. His stage plays have been seen in Canada, the United Kingdom, Australia and in the United States

His other plays have included Urbanite, Place of First Light (cowritten with Sean Panting), Charismatic Death Scenes, Belly Up, Emptygirl, Oil and Water, Isle des Demons, Lemons, One Foot Wet, Signals, Under Wraps and Vive La Rose. Belly Up was also published in the Breakwater Book of Contemporary Newfoundland Plays: Volume 3. In 2016, he published a book of short stories, Two-Man Tent. He has won numerous Newfoundland and Labrador Arts and Letters Awards, and was named 1998 Emerging Artist of the Year by the Newfoundland and Labrador Arts Council.

In 2018, Memorial University of Newfoundland awarded Chafe the degree of doctor of letters honoris causa "for his major contribution to Newfoundland theatre and culture."

Chafe has acted, both on stage and in the 2006 television miniseries Above and Beyond. When Artistic Fraud of Newfoundland was formed in 1995, Chafe was an original cast member and, since 2000, has served as artistic director. Some of his first performances with Artistic Fraud were in the shows In Your Dreams, Freud; The Cheat; Jesus Christ Superstar; and Great Big Stick.

In 2022, Chafe collaborated with Scott Jones on I Forgive You, a play about the aftermath of Jones being left paraplegic by an anti-gay attack in 2013. Following the play's publication in book form, Chafe and Jones were nominated for the Governor General's Award for English-language drama at the 2024 Governor General's Awards, marking Chafe's fifth nomination.

== Early and personal life ==
Chafe is from Petty Harbour, Newfoundland. He attended Goulds elementary, McPherson Jr High and Bishops College. He and his three brothers were raised by William Robert Chafe (Petty Harbour, Newfoundland) who worked in the construction industry and Elizabeth Pynn (Quirpon, Newfoundland) who was a homemaker. He worked for his father's construction company until he was eighteen years old. Chafe attended the Memorial University of Newfoundland. He performed in two youth productions with Elysian Theatre Company. He is openly gay.

== Bibliography ==
=== Plays ===
- Urbanite (1993)
- Tempting Providence (2002)
- Isle of Demons (2004)
- Afterimage (2010)
- Fear of Flight (2010)
- Oil and Water (2011)
- Under Wraps (2014)
- The Colony of Unrequited Dreams (2015)
- Between Breaths (2018)
- Everybody Just C@lm The F#ck Down (2022)
- I Forgive You (2024, cowritten with Scott Jones)

=== Short stories ===
- Two-Man Tent (2016)
- Shiny and New (2018)
