= Canac =

Canac is a surname. Notable people with the surname include:

- Adeline Canac (born 1990), French pair skater
- Michel Canac (1956–2019), French skier
- Normand Canac-Marquis, Canadian actor and writer from Quebec
- Pierre Canac (1780–1850), Canadian businessman and politician
