= Jason Hall (playwright) =

Canadian playwright (born 1978)

Jason Hall (born 1978) is a Canadian playwright. He was born and raised in Toronto, Ontario. He attended Queen's University, King's College London, and the Royal Academy of Dramatic Art.

Eyes Catch Fire, his first full-length play, won Canada's Herman Voaden Playwriting Competition in 2003. It was subsequently produced at the Finborough Theatre, London in 2004 and was selected as a Time Out Critics' Choice.

GBS, his second play, was first produced at Toronto's Factory Theatre in 2004 as part of the Toronto Fringe Festival. Its second production was in 2006 at Theatre503, London. GBS' third production took place in March–April 2010 at New York's off-Broadway Kirk Theatre on Theatre Row.

Stand Sentry, a short film adapted from his play of the same name, premiered at the Strasbourg International Film Festival on August 31, 2009.

In 2005, he was selected by the Royal Court Theatre Young Writers Programme to attend the World Interplay Festival in Australia. Later that year, he was chosen by the British Council's Visiting Arts programme to spend three months in residence at El Teatro Libre in Bogotá, Colombia.

He currently resides in London, UK.

== Plays ==
- Africa Calls
- Avian Citizen
- Eyes Catch Fire
- GBS
- Insurgency
- Stand Sentry
- 10, 11, 12 Third Floor
