= Brian Drader =

Canadian stage actor and playwright

- Born: 1960 (age 65–66); Winnipeg, Manitoba, Canada
- Occupation: playwright
- Writing career
- Period: 1980s-present
- Notable works: Prok, The Fruit Machine

Brian Drader (born 1960) is a Canadian stage actor and playwright. He is best known for his plays Prok, about Alfred Kinsey and Clara McMillen, and The Fruit Machine, about the Royal Canadian Mounted Police's controversial 1960s fruit machine project to identify homosexual people.

Originally from Winnipeg, Manitoba, he is currently based in Montreal, Quebec, where he teaches playwriting at the National Theatre School of Canada.

His other plays have included Easter Eggs, TuckTuck, The Author's Voice, The Norbals, Mind of the Iguana, Liar, To Be Frank, Everybody's Business and Curtsy.

== Awards ==
He won the Herman Voaden Playwriting Competition in 1997 for The Norbals.

Prok was a shortlisted nominee for the Governor General's Award for English-language drama at the 2003 Governor General's Awards, and won the Lambda Literary Award for drama at the 16th Lambda Literary Awards.
