= What Lies Before Us =

Play by Morris Panych

What Lies Before Us is a comedic play by Morris Panych. It takes place in the Canadian Rocky Mountains in 1885, where a railway survey team, Keating and Ambrose, and their Chinese servant Wing, are stranded after being abandoned by their wilderness guide. The play was a 2007 nominee for the Governor General's Award for English-language drama.

Keating and Ambrose argue over what to do - winter approaches and their food supply is dwindling. Ambrose eventually decides to go for help, but an avalanche injures his leg and traps them. Ambrose learns that Keating has contracted rabies from a squirrel, and that he himself has gangrene on his injured leg. While Keating remains optimistic even after becoming paralyzed, Ambrose loses hope. Ultimately, both Keating and Ambrose die, and Wing is left alone to deliver a monologue in Chinese.

The premiere tour of What Lies Before Us featured:

- Director: Jim Millan
- Keating: Matthew MacFadzean
- Ambrose: David Storch
- Wing: Wayne Sujo

== Sources ==
1. Pat St. Germain. "'What Lies Before Us' a bleak comedy". Sun Media. Archived from the original on March 10, 2016.
2. Richard Ouzounian (2007-01-29). "What Lies Before Us". Variety.
