= Taste Buds (TV series) =

Canadian children's television series

- Genre: Cooking show
- Written by: Laurie Elliott; Mike McPhaden; Julie Mee; Steven Diguer; Deborah Chantson
- Country of origin: Canada
- No. of seasons: 3
- No. of episodes: 32

Production
- Executive producers: Mark Bishop; Matt Hornburg
- Producers: Anne Beben; Roberta Pazdro; Sarah Glinski; Steven Diguer; Stephen J. Turnbull; Gord McLennan; Sasha Boersma
- Production location: Canada
- Running time: 23 minutes
- Production companies: Marblemedia; TVO

Original release
- Network: TVOntario
- Release: September 1, 2008 – September 24, 2012

Taste Buds is a Canadian children's television series, produced by (TVOntario) by partners/executive producers Mark Bishop and Matt Hornburg of Toronto's Marblemedia. The series premiered on September 1, 2008 and ended on September 24, 2012 after 3 seasons.

== Synopsis ==
This is a cooking show geared to children aged 7–10, that teaches children to think about what they eat and explore new foods from around the world. The two young hosts, Avery and Lily, cook recipes that are easy for kids to make by themselves or with a bit of grown up help. The episodes follow Avery and Lily as they lead viewers on new taste adventures exploring the culture, history, science and art behind different foods. Also helping out in the kitchen is their adult co-host Matt, a chef and fellow Taste Bud who is passionate about food and eager to share his expert knowledge. It also stars other kids that help out and try foods on every episode.

The show also contains the high-tech Chillbot 3000, a voice-activated computer fridge that outputs recipes, facts and tips in a flash. Chillbot also connects the Taste Buds to one of four field correspondents: Health Meister, Science Whiz, World Traveller and History Buff, each providing the hosts with background educational information on the food they are working with.

== Broadcast ==
The show premiered on TVO in Canada on September 1, 2008. Reruns began airing in the United States on Qubo from June 30, 2012 (alongside Artzooka!, Jakers! The Adventures of Piggley Winks and Harry and His Bucket Full of Dinosaurs) to May 24, 2014. The show is streaming free on HappyKids.

== Hosts ==
=== Avery ===
Avery (Avery Bilz) believes that food is fun, so his cooking tends to follow his intuition instead of a recipe. When baking cookies, he will go with the flow and add mini-marshmallows to the dough if he feels like it. He is always willing to try a new taste sensation—especially if his co-host Lily "eggs" him

=== Matt ===
Matt (Matt Austin) is the fun and quirky grown-up in the group. He acts as a mentor for Lily and Avery. Like Lily and Avery, Matt loves to cook. He is a natural. He creates different cooking challenges for them. He usually judges the dishes they make.

=== Jasmine ===
To "spice up" this cooking show, Jasmine (Danielle Himelfarb) is thrust into the mix for six episodes, and quickly sizzled her way to the top. Jasmine first appeared in "Foods that Zing,” as well as, "Foods That Are Colourful,” Foods for Kings and Queens,” “Foods That Roll,” "Foods That Are Stacked,” and "Foods for a Party.” Critics of the show favorably reviewed Jasmine, who continues to have a foothold in the rise of pre-teen culinary television.

=== Safety Elf ===
Safety Elf (Anneke van der Laan) usually appears during cooking segments where she informs the viewers with her signature catchphrase "Get a grown-up". She wears a yellow and black chef's hat with a yellow chef's coat with black buttons and yellow pants.

== Awards ==
At the 2010 Gemini Awards, Marblemedia accepted the company's first-ever Gemini, for Taste Buds season 2, in the category of "Best Cross-Platform Production – Children's and Youth". Taste Buds was shot at various locations in and around Toronto and Southern Ontario.

Year	Award	Category	Recipients	Result
2009	Webby Indie Award	Official Honoree for the Youth Category	TasteBuds	Won
2009	CFTPA Indie Award	Best Convergent New Media Award	TasteBuds	Nominated
2010	W3	Silver W3 Award	TasteBuds	Won
2010	Gemini Award	Gemini Award for best Cross-Platform Project: Children's and Youth	TasteBuds	Won
2011	YMA Award of Excellence	Special Jury Award: Digital and interactive Content	TasteBuds	Won
2011	YMA Award of Excellence	Best Convergent Interactive Content	TasteBuds	Won
2011	YMA Award of Excellence	Special Jury Award: Television	TasteBuds	Nominated
2012	Golden Sheaf Award	Digital Media Category	TasteBuds	Nominated

== Episodes ==
- All episode titles begin with the word "Foods".

=== Season 1 (2008–09) ===
1. "Foods That Smell"
2. "Foods That Melt"
3. "Foods That Grow"
4. "Foods That Stick"
5. "Foods That Fuel"
6. "Foods That Crunch"
7. "Foods That Are Flat"
8. "Foods That Are Sweet"
9. "Foods That Are Purple"
10. "Foods That Sizzle"
11. "Foods That Rise"
12. "Foods That Stretch"
13. "Foods That Crack"

=== Season 2 (2009–10) ===
1. "Foods That Make You Smile"
2. "Foods That Are Ooey-Gooey"
3. "Foods That Make You Pucker"
4. "Foods That Ooze"
5. "Foods That Are Fancy"
6. "Foods That Are Hot"
7. "Foods That Flow"
8. "Foods That Are Super-Powerful"
9. "Foods That Start with 'Q'"
10. "Foods That Are Wrapped"
11. "Foods for the Brain"
12. "Foods That Are Raw"
13. "Foods for Dudes"

=== Season 3 (2010–11) ===
1. "Foods That Zing"
2. "Foods That Are Stacked"
3. "Foods That Roll"
4. "Foods for Kings and Queens"
5. "Foods That Are Colourful"
6. "Foods for a Party"
