= David Yee =

Canadian actor and playwright

- Born: Toronto, Ontario, Canada
- Citizenship: Canadian
- Education: University of Toronto
- Occupations: Actor; playwright
- Notable work: lady in the red dress; carried away on the crest of a wave; acquiesce
- Awards: Carol Bolt Award (2013) Governor General's Award (2015); Siminovitch Prize in Theatre (2023)
- Website: www.outlawpoet.ca

David Yee is a Canadian actor and playwright. His play lady in the red dress was a shortlisted nominee for the Governor General's Award for English language drama at the 2010 Governor General's Awards. His play carried away on the crest of a wave won this award at the 2015 Governor General's Awards. In 2023, David was named as the Laureate of the Siminovitch Prize in Theatre, which recognizes artists whose groundbreaking work is advancing the art form. The Siminovitch jury praised David's unique and prolific voice as well as his advocacy in the Asian Canadian community.

== Early life ==
Yee was born and raised in Toronto, Ontario, Canada. He is of Chinese and Scottish ancestry. He graduated from the University of Toronto Mississauga theatre and drama studies program in 2000. Intending to pursue acting he focused instead on play writing.

== Career ==
His play lady in the red dress was a shortlisted nominee for the Governor General's Award for English language drama at the 2010 Governor General's Awards.

In 2011, his play paper Series was shortlisted for the 2011 Carol Bolt Award. He won the 2013 Carol Bolt Award for Best Work Premiered by a Playwrights Guild of Canada member for his play carried away on the crest of a wave. The play debuted in 2013 at the Tarragon Theatre; its American premiere was later that year in Fairfax, Virginia.

In 2015, Yee received a nomination for the Dora Mavor Moore Award for Outstanding New Musical/Opera for Tapestry Briefs: Booster Shots (Tapestry Opera). His play carried away on the crest of a wave won the Governor General's Award for English language drama at the 2015 Governor General's Awards.

His play, acquiesce, about a man plagued by the success of his first book and being haunted by his past, was performed at the Factory Theatre in November 2016.

Yee is a co-founder and current artistic director of fu-GEN Asian Canadian Theatre Company. He is playwright-in-residence at the Tarragon Theatre in Toronto.

His work has been published in the Asian-Canadian drama anthology Love & Relasianships (edited by Nina Lee Aquino) and the monologue book Refractions: Solo (edited by Yvette Nolan and Donna-Michelle St. Bernard).
