= Curtis Campbell (writer) =

Canadian writer

Curtis Campbell (formerly Curtis te Brinke) is a Canadian writer. He is most noted for his 2022 Toronto Fringe Festival play Gay for Pay with Blake & Clay, which he cowrote with Daniel Krolik.

== Education ==
Campbell attended Central Huron Secondary School in Clinton, Ontario. He won an Outstanding Performance award at the Ontario Drama Festival in 2012.

He subsequently studied theatre at York University.

== Career ==
Campbell and Daniel Krolik co-wrote the play Gay for Pay with Blake & Play, which ran at the 2022 Toronto Fringe Festival. Itreceived a Dora Mavor Moore Award nomination for Outstanding Original Play, Independent Theatre in 2023. They returned to the 2023 Fringe Festival with the sequel show Blake and Clay's Gay Agenda.

In 2016, Campbell and Sadie Epstein-Fine self-produced the play Tire Swing at Kensington Hall in Toronto.

Campbell's debut novel, Dragging Mason County, was published by Annick Press in 2023. It was a finalist for the inaugural Jacqueline Woodson Award in 2024.
