= Don't You Forget About Me (film) =

- Directed by: Matt Austin
- Written by: Matt Austin; Michael Facciolo; Kari Hollend; Lenny Panzer
- Produced by: Michael Baker; Michael Facciolo; Kari Hollend
- Edited by: Frank Guidoccio
- Production company: Stay the Course Productions
- Distributed by: Alliance Films
- Release date: November 3, 2009
- Running time: 73 minutes
- Country: Canada
- Language: English

Don't You Forget About Me is a 2009 Canadian documentary film about screenwriter, director, and producer John Hughes. Directed by Matt Austin, the film was named after the 1985 song of the same name by Simple Minds, which in turn was the theme song for Hughes' film The Breakfast Club. The film specifically focused on Hughes' fade from prominence in the early 1990s.

== Background ==
The documentary details the journey of a group of young filmmakers who go in search of the reclusive icon, documenting their search through interviews of the people with whom Hughes had worked and fans of his films. Those interviewed include Ilan Mitchell-Smith, Ally Sheedy, Judd Nelson, Kelly Le Brock, Mia Sara, Alan Ruck, Kevin Smith, Roger Ebert, and Jim Kerr of the band Simple Minds. Filming began in 2006.

== Home media ==
The film was completed in 2008, but did not find a distributor for over a year.

When Hughes died of a heart attack, aged 59, on August 6, 2009, a bidding war broke out for the film. It was announced on August 11, 2009, that the film would be distributed by Alliance Films. The film aired on the TV channel Encore for a brief time as well.
