= Mariya Khomutova =

Ukrainian actress and playwright

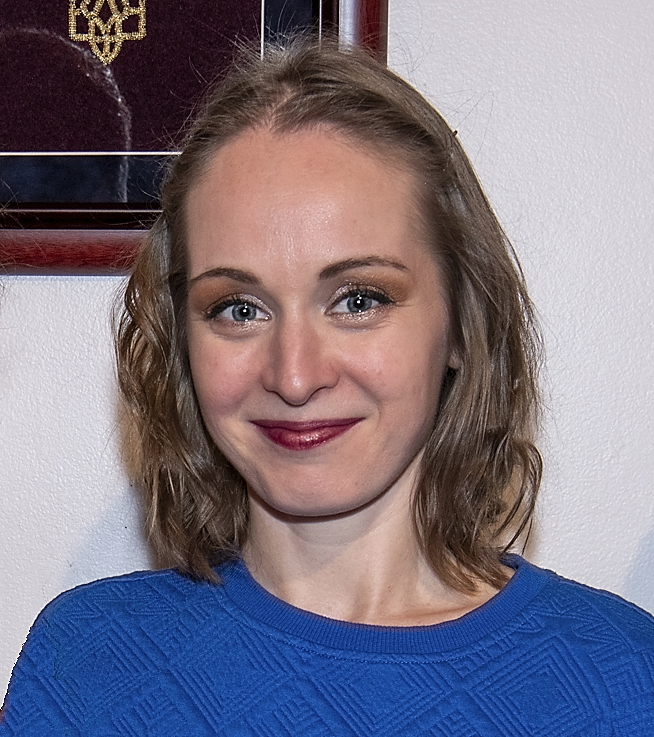
Mariya Khomutova after her performance in the play "The First Métis Man of Odesa" in Punctuate! Theatre in Toronto

Mariya Khomutova (born March 9, 1987) is a Ukrainian actress and playwright currently based in Canada. She is most noted for the stage play The First Métis Man of Odesa, a collaboration with her husband Matthew MacKenzie, for which they won the Dora Mavor Moore Award for Outstanding New Play, Independent Theatre in 2023.

== Biography ==
A native of Odesa, she had a number of stage and film acting roles in Ukraine, most notably a supporting part as Kursantka in the film Battle for Sevastopol, before meeting MacKenzie when he was in the country on a cultural exchange. The First Métis Man of Odesa, a dramatization of their relationship and the impact of outside events such as the COVID-19 pandemic and the Russian invasion of Ukraine on their family, premiered at The Theatre Centre in Toronto, Ontario in March 2023, before embarking on a national tour of Canada with engagements in Edmonton, Vancouver, Saskatoon and Winnipeg. Mackenzie and Khomutova were jointly credited as co-writers of the play even though Khomutova had no prior experience as a playwright, and starred in the production together even though MacKenzie had only limited prior experience as an actor.

She also participated in an online reading of Lianna Makuch's stage play Barvinok (Blood of Our Soil), which was staged by the Blyth Festival in 2022 as a special fundraiser for humanitarian efforts in Ukraine.

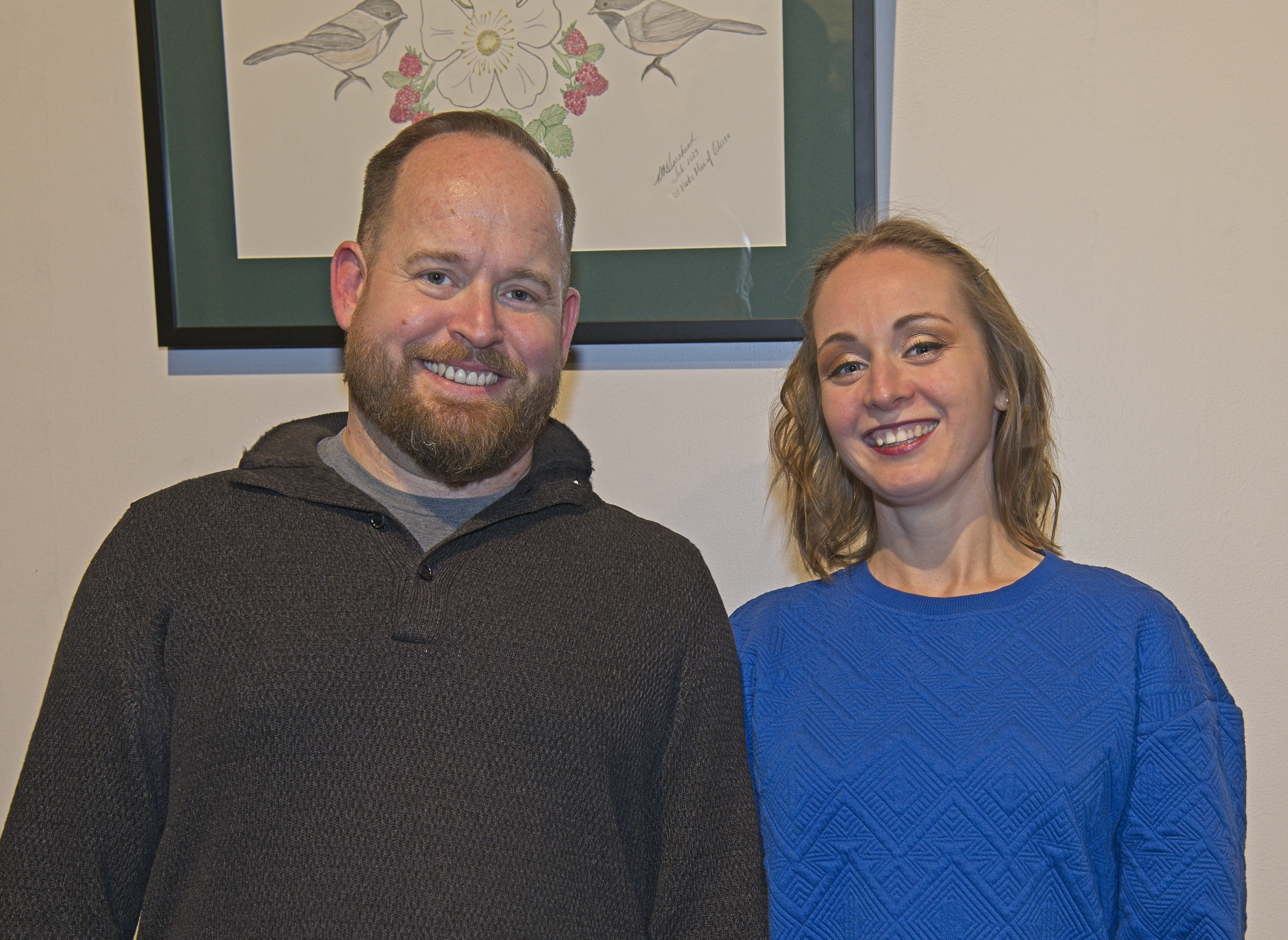
Matthew MacKenzie & Mariya Khomutova in 2023
