= Hengameh E. Rice =

Hengameh E. Rice is the pen name of a playwriting duo from Edmonton, Alberta. They are most noted for their theatrical play Anahita's Republic.

The duo consists of "Hengameh", an Iranian-born immigrant who left the country after the 2009 killing of Neda Agha-Soltan, and "Rice", an Edmonton native. They keep their individual identities private to protect themselves from retribution as Anahita's Republic is strongly critical of the Iranian government.

The play premiered at Toronto's Factory Theatre in March 2023, and was staged at Edmonton's Backstage Theatre in May. The play was a Dora Mavor Moore Award nominee for Best Original Play, Independent Theatre in 2023.
