= Jacqueline Woodson Award =

Literary award for LGBT books for youth

- Awarded for: LGBTQ+ children's literature
- Sponsored by: Publishing Triangle
- Reward: US$1,000
- Established: 2024

The Jacqueline Woodson Award for LGBTQ+ Children's/YA Literature, established in 2024, is an annual literary award presented by the Publishing Triangle that honors "works of literature geared towards children and young adults that explore themes related to LGBTQ+ experiences, identities, and issues". Selected books explore LGBTQ+ topics in "an age-appropriate and sensitive manner". The award honors American writer Jacqueline Woodson. Winners receive a $1,000 prize.

== Recipients ==
Award winners and finalists
Year	Author	Title	Publisher	Result	Ref.
2024	Danny Ramadan	Salma Writes a Book	Annick Press	Winner	
2024	Lawrence Lindell	Blackward	Drawn & Quarterly	Finalist	
2024	Curtis Campbell	Dragging Mason County	Annick Press	Finalist	
2024	Justine Pucella Winans	The Otherwoods	Bloomsbury Children's Books	Finalist	
2025	Jonny Garza Villa	Canto Contigo	Wednesday Books	Winner	
2025	Li Charmaine Anne	Crash Landing	Annick Press	Finalist	
2025	NoNieqa Ramos	They Thought They Buried Us	Lerner Publishing Group	Finalist	
2025	Leslie Jay and Loveis Wise	What I Must Tell the World: How Lorraine Hansberry Found Her Voice	Zando-Hillman Grad Books	Finalist	
2026	H. E. Edgmon	We Can Never Leave	Wednesday Books	Winner	
2026	Kimm Topping	Generation Queer	Lee & Low Books	Finalist	
2026	Ana Oncina	Planeta	TOKYOPOP	Finalist	
2026	Kamryn Kingsberry	Star Fruit	IKB Press	Finalist	
2026	E. K. Johnston	Titan of the Stars	Tundra Books	Finalist	
