= Damian Tarnopolsky =

Canadian writer

Damian Tarnopolsky is a Canadian writer from Toronto, Ontario.

Born and raised in England, Tarnopolsky moved to Canada at age 15 with his family. Educated at the University of Toronto and Oxford University, he published his debut short story collection, Lanzmann and Other Stories, in 2006, and received a ReLit Award nomination in 2007. His short stories have also been nominated for the Journey Prize, the CBC Literary Prize, and the Austin Clarke Prize in Literary Excellence.

Goya's Dog followed in 2009. It was a shortlisted finalist for the Amazon.ca First Novel Award in 2010. It was also named to the initial shortlist for the Commonwealth Writers Prize, Canada-Caribbean, in 2010.

In 2019, he won the Herman Voaden Playwriting Competition for his stage play The Defence.

His most recent short story collection, Every Night I Dream I'm a Monk, Every Night I Dream I'm a Monster, was published in 2024.
