= Eric Woolfe =

Canadian actor

Eric Woolfe is an actor, playwright, puppeteer, magician, and the artistic director of Eldritch Theatre, a Toronto-based theatre company specializing in horror plays using puppetry, live actors, and parlor magic.

== Career ==
Some of his credits include roles in:

- The Haunted Medicine Show.
- Madhouse Variations.
- The Babysitter.
- The Strange & Eerie Memoirs of Billy Wuthergloom.
- Dear Grendelmaus.
- Sideshow of the Damned.
- The Comedy of Errors (Humber River Shakespeare).
- The Last Christmas Turkey (Touchmark Theatre).
- Rocket & the Queen of Dreams (Roseneath Theatre)
- Little Shop of Horrors (Canstage)
- Timon in Disney's The Lion King.

== Nominations and credits ==
Eric Woolfe has been nominated for over a dozen Dora Mavor Moore Awards, as both an actor and playwright. He is a three-time nominee for the KM Hunter Memorial Award, which the Ontario Arts Council uses to celebrate mid-career artists.

Other credits include Step Right Up!, and Twas, for Theatre Orangeville, Pomeranski Rex for The Toronto Fringe, and the film scripts Momento Mori, Hungry Dead Things, and Blackwood Hotel.

His film and TV credits include Mr. Rose, Defiance, Murdoch Mysteries, Haven, Doc, Due South, Traders, Fatman, Beyblade as the fictional commentator AJ Topper, and, most notably, in George Romero's modern zombie film, Survival of the Dead.
