= Christine Horne =

Canadian actress (born 1981)

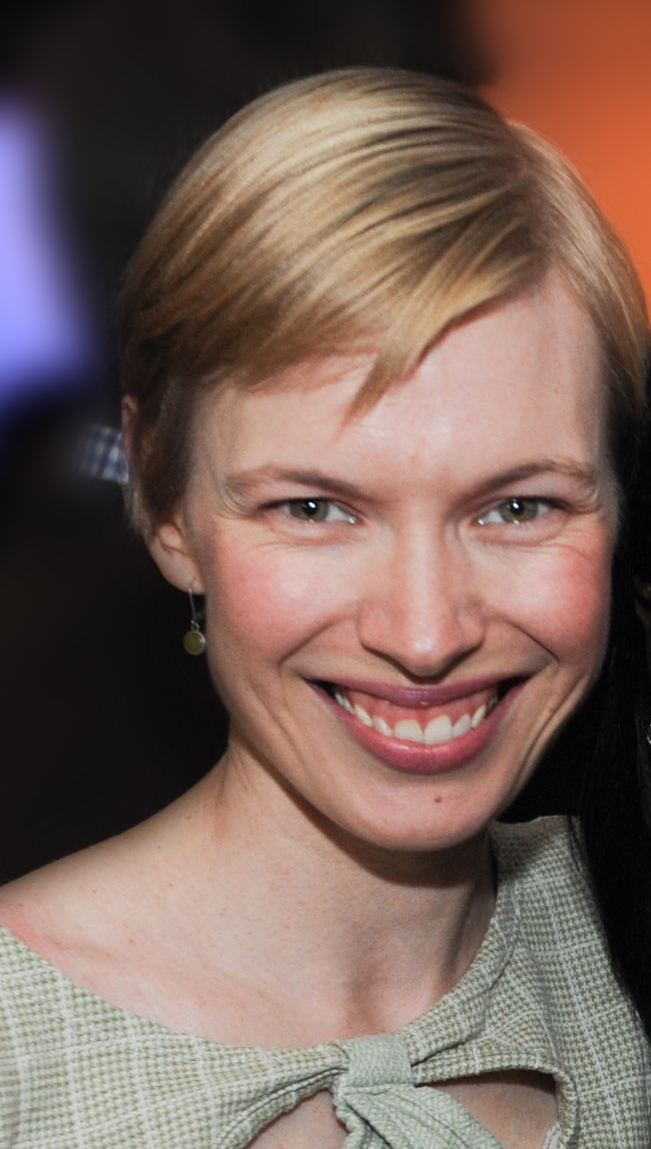
- Horne at the 2013 Toronto International Film Festival
- Born: December 14, 1981 (age 44); Aurora, Ontario, Canada
- Occupation: Actress
- Years active: 2006–present
- Spouse: Mike McPhaden

Christine Horne (born December 14, 1981) is a Canadian actress. She received her BFA in Theatre at York University in 2004 and has since become an established stage actor in Toronto.

She has been nominated for three Dora Mavor Moore Awards for Outstanding Performance by a Female in a Principal Role, and won in 2010 for her role as The Governess in The Turn of the Screw.

In 2019 she played Prince Hamlet in Ravi Jain's gender-flipped adaptation of Hamlet, opposite Ho Ka Kei as Ophelia.

She won the Canadian Screen Award for Best Guest Performance in a Drama Series at the 4th Canadian Screen Awards in 2016 for an appearance in Remedy, and was nominated in the same category at the 5th Canadian Screen Awards in 2017 for an appearance in Saving Hope. At the Vancouver Film Critics Circle Awards 2007, she was nominated for Best Supporting Actress in a Canadian Film for her role as the young Hagar Shipley in The Stone Angel.

She is married to television writer and producer Mike McPhaden.

== Filmography ==
=== Film ===
Year	Title	Role	Notes
2007	The Stone Angel	Hagar Currie Shipley (young)	
2010	The Untitled Work of Paul Shepard	Sadie	
2012	Margarita	Jane	
2012	Stories We Tell	Anne Tait	
2013	Sex After Kids	Ellie	
2013	Tru Love	Suzanne	
2014	The Captive	Vicky	
2015	Hyena Road	Capt. Jennifer Bowman	
2015	How to Plan an Orgy in a Small Town	Ellie	
2016	Unless	Dr. Devita	
2017	Darken	Clarity	
2018	The Go-Getters	Chablis	
2018	Our House	Jess	
2019	White Lie	Julia Stansfield	
2019	Entropic	Tess	
2022	Ashgrove	Dr. Lakeland	

=== Television ===
Year	Title	Role	Notes	Ref.
2006	Missing	Receptionist	Episode: "Exposure"	
2007–2008	The Dresden Files	Amber	Episodes: "Pilot", "Things That Go Bump"	
2008	Othello the Tragedy of the Moor	Desdemona	TV film	
2009	Flashpoint	Sara Kominski	Episode: "One Wrong Move"	
2010	H.M.S.: White Coat	Dr. Janis	TV film	
2011	Republic of Doyle	Kim Ryan	Episode: "The Ryans and the Pittmans"	
2011	Befriend and Betray	Melanie Meadwell	TV film	
2011	King	Amanda Jacobs	Episode: "Amanda Jacobs"	
2011	Rookie Blue	Lidia Hannah	Episode: "Heart & Sparks"	
2012	Cybergeddon	Irina	Episodes: "Look at Me Now", "The Rabbit Hole"	
2012	Cybergeddon Zips	Irina	Episode: "Irina"	
2013	Borealis	Svetlana	TV film	
2013	Played	Anna Quinn	Episode: "Lawyers"	
2013–2014	Lost Girl	Arabella / The Keeper	Recurring role (season 4)	
2015	Remedy	Jane Bauer	Episode: "Playing Dr. Conner"	
2015	Killjoys	Dr. Lyra Grange	Episode: "A Glitch in the System"	
2015	Saving Hope	Natalie Dryden	Episode: "Beasts of Burden"	
2015, 2020	Murdoch Mysteries	Svetlana Tsiolkofsky	Episodes: "24 Hours Til Doomsday", "Staring Blindly Into the Future", "The Trial of Terrance Meyers"	
2016	Dark Matter	Mikkei Combine Member	Episode: "But First, We Save the Galaxy"	
2017	Degrassi: Next Class	London Professor	Episode: "#ILookLikeA"	
2018	Darken: Before Dark	Clarity	Main role	
2019	Riviera	Rose Ryland	Episodes: "2.1", "2.3", "2.10"	
2019	Frankie Drake Mysteries	Louise Barton	Episode: "No Friends Like Old Friends"	
2020	Hey Lady!	Lassie	TV series short	
2023	Fellow Travelers	Jean Kerr	Miniseries	
