= Ho Ka Kei =

Ho Ka Kei, sometimes credited as Jeff Ho, is a Hong Kong-born Canadian stage actor and playwright. He is most noted for his plays Iphigenia and the Furies (On Taurian Land) and Antigone: 方, which won the 2023 Lambda Literary Award for Drama and were shortlisted for the 2022 Governor General's Award for English-language drama.

A graduate of the National Theatre School of Canada, Kei's other plays have included trace and Cockroach. As an actor, he is most noted for his performance as Ophelia in Ravi Jain's gender-flipped adaptation of Hamlet, opposite Christine Horne as Prince Hamlet.

Alongside Colin Asuncion, Hume Baugh, Samson Bonkeabantu Brown, Keith Cole, daniel jelani ellis, Daniel Krolik, Michael Hughes, Indrit Kasapi, Eric Morin, G Kyle Shields, Chy Ryan Spain and Geoffrey Whynot, he was a Dora Mavor Moore Award nominee for Outstanding Performance by an Ensemble, Independent Theatre in 2020, for Buddies in Bad Times's production of Brian Francis's Box 4901.
