= Anusree Roy =

Canadian writer

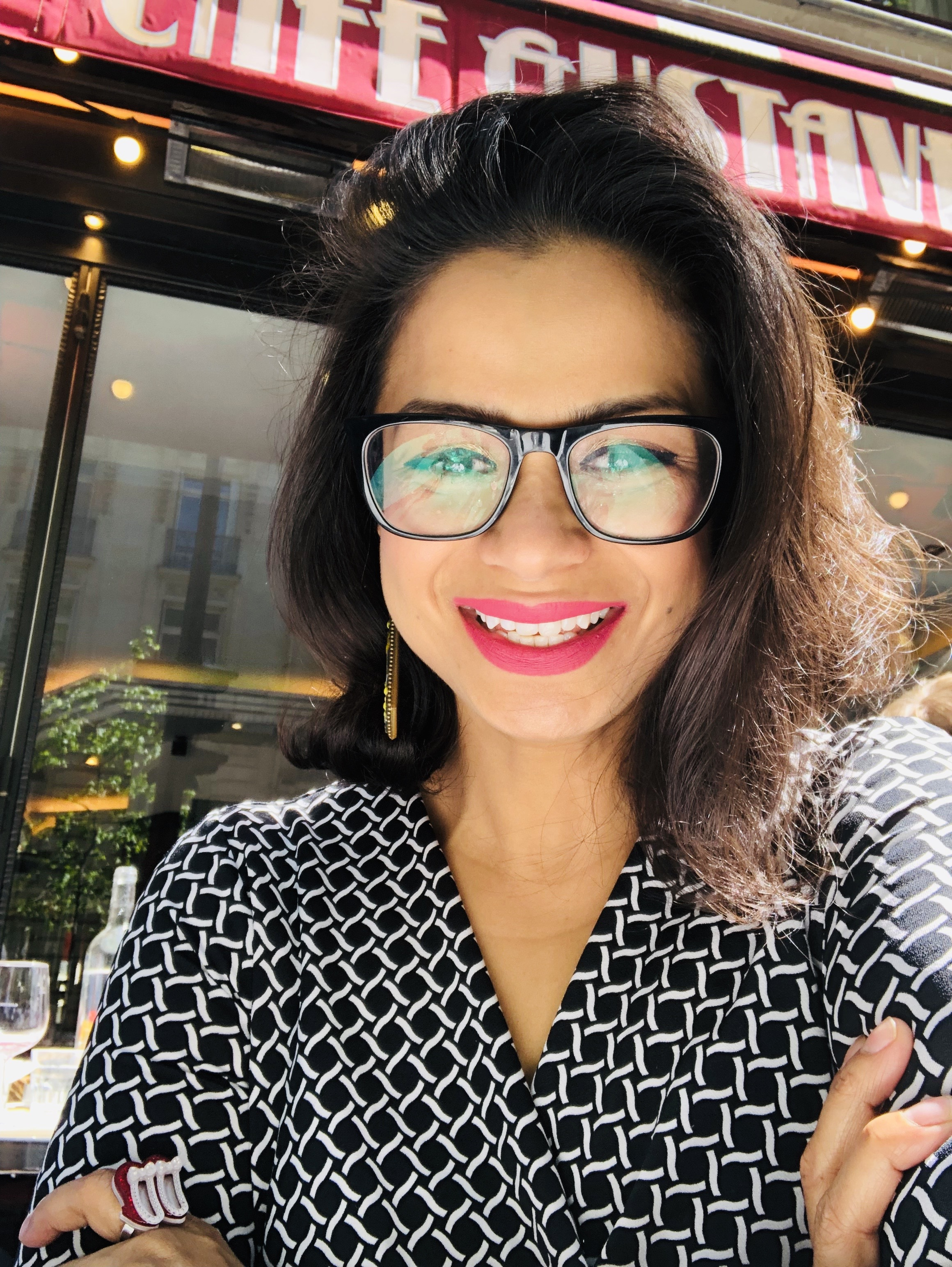
- Roy in May 2019
- Born: Kolkata, West Bengal, India
- Citizenship: Canadian
- Education: York University; University of Toronto
- Occupations: Playwright; Actor; Screenwriter; Co-Executive Producer
- Spouse: Ryan Ravi Tiwari (m. 2018)
- Writing career
- Period: 2000s–present
- Notable works: Pyaasa; Brothel #9; Letters to my Grandma; Roshni; Sultans of the Street; Little Pretty & The Exceptional; Trident Moon; Sisters; Through the Eyes of God
- Notable awards: Dora Mavor Moore Awards; Siminovitch Prize in Theatre; Toronto Theatre Critics Awards; Carol Bolt Award; K.M. Hunter Artist Award; RBC Emerging Artist Award
- Website: anusreeroy.com

Anusree Roy is a Canadian playwright, actor, screenwriter, and co-executive producer. Anusree is a two-time finalist for the Governor General's Award and four-time Dora Award-winner; she has also been nominated for a Canadian Screen Award for "Best Guest Performance, Drama Series" for the television show Allegiance.

== Education ==
Roy was born in Kolkata, India, and immigrated to Canada with her family as a teenager.

She holds a Bachelor of Arts in theatre from York University and a Master of Arts from the University of Toronto.

== Theatre work ==
She premiered her first piece, breathlessness, in 2006. Her play Pyaasa debuted at Theatre Passe Muraille in 2007 and won two Dora Mavor Moore Awards in the independent theatre division in 2008, including Outstanding New Play and Outstanding Performance (Female).

Her subsequent plays have included Letters to My Grandma, Roshni, and Brothel #9. Brothel #9 won the Carol Bolt Award and the Dora Mavor Moore Award for Outstanding New Play in 2011, and was a nominee for the Governor General's Award for English-language drama at the 2012 Governor General's Awards. She has also won the RBC Emerging Artist Award, the K.M. Hunter Award, and the Siminovitch Protege Prize.

Trident Moon premiered at the Finborough Theatre in London, England, and was a 2018 Susan Smith Blackburn Prize finalist. Her subsequent play Little Pretty & The Exceptional premiered at the Factory Theatre in 2017.

Her audio play Sisters premiered online on Apple Podcasts and Spotify on March 20, 2021. She has written two operas, Noor over Afghan and The Golden Boy.

She has been playwright-in-residence at the Canadian Stage Company, Theatre Passe Muraille, Nightwood Theatre, Factory Theatre, and Blyth Festival. She is co-artistic director with David DeGrow and Thomas Morgan Jones of Theatre Jones Roy.

In 2025, her play "Trident Moon" premiered in a joint-production at Crow's Theatre in Toronto, and National Arts Centre, in Ottawa, Ontario. It was nominated for a Dora Mavor Moore Award for "Outstanding New Play".

In 2026, her play "Through the Eyes of God" premiered at Theatre Passe Muraille in Toronto; it has been awarded the Toronto Theatre Critics Award for "Best Production of a Play"; it has also been nominated for the upcoming Dora Mavor Moore Award, for 'Outstanding New Play'.

== Television work ==
She played Nurse Patel on the television series Remedy in 2014 and 2015. She was also a story editor for Remedy in its first season. She was an executive story editor on season 5 of sci-fi drama Killjoys. She has been an executive story editor and consulting producer, respectively, on the first two seasons of Nurses. She was a consulting producer and writer on CTV's Transplant.

She has also been a creative consultant in the Netflix show I Woke Up A Vampire, as well as supervising producer and writer in Paramount+/CBC's SkyMed. Her recent writing works include CBC's Allegiance and AMC's The Vampire Lestat.

== Adjunct professor ==
Anusree Roy has been an adjunct professor of playwriting at the University of Toronto, and a professor of creating writing, teaching advanced writing of drama to Master of Fine Arts students, at the University of British Columbia.

== Plays ==
- Pyaasa
- Letters to My Grandma
- Roshni – The play follows two young beggars in the streets of Kolkata who are determined to take destiny into their own hands.
- Brothel # 9
- Sultans of the Street
- Little Pretty and The Exceptional
- Trident Moon
- Sisters
- Through the Eyes of God

== Awards and nominations ==
Year	Nominated work	Award	Category	Result	Ref.
2008	Pyaasa	Dora Mavor Moore Award	Outstanding New Play or Musical	Won	
2008	Pyaasa	Dora Mavor Moore Award	Outstanding Performance by a Female	Won	
2009		RBC Emerging Artist Award		Won	
2010	Letters to My Grandma	Dora Mavor Moore Award	Outstanding New Play	Nominated	
2010	Letters to My Grandma	Dora Mavor Moore Award	Outstanding Performance by a Female in a Principal Role – Play	Nominated	
2011	Brothel #9	Dora Mavor Moore Award	Outstanding New Play	Won	
2011	Brothel #9	Carol Bolt Award		Won	
2011		K.M. Hunter Artist Award	Theatre	Won	
2011		Siminovitch Prize in Theatre	Protégé	Won	
2012	Brothel #9	Governor General's Awards	English-language drama	Finalist	
2014	Sultans of the Street	Dora Mavor Moore Award	Outstanding New Play for Young Audiences	Won	
2018	Trident Moon	Susan Smith Blackburn Prize		Finalist	
2025	Trident Moon	Dora Mavor Moore Award	Outstanding New Play	Nominated	
2025	Little Pretty and the Exceptional	Governor General's Awards	English-language drama	Finalist	
2026	Through the Eyes of God	Toronto Theatre Critics Award	Best Production of a Play	Won	
2026	Through the Eyes of God	Dora Mavor Moore Award	Outstanding New Play	Nominated	
2026	Allegiance	Canadian Screen Awards	Best Guest Performance, Drama Series	Nominated	
