= Normand Canac-Marquis =

Canadian actor and writer

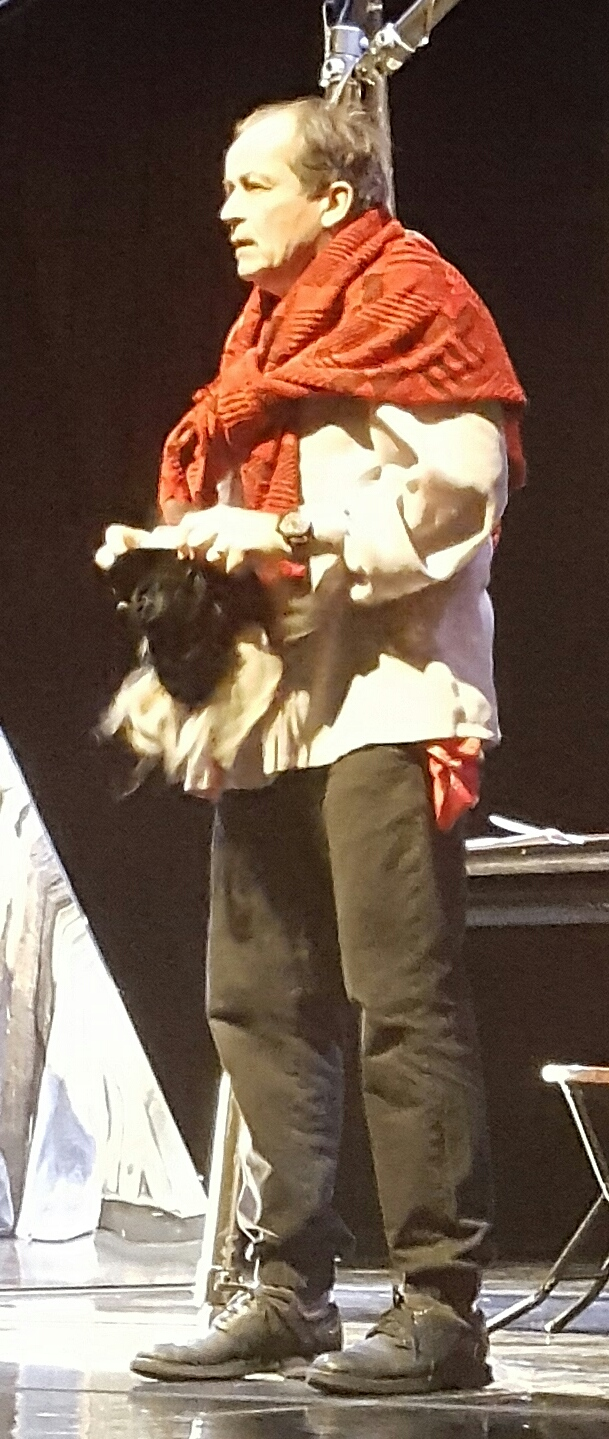
- Years active: 1970s–present

Normand Canac-Marquis is a Canadian actor and writer from Quebec.

His play Le Syndrome de Cézanne was shortlisted for the Governor General's Award for French-language drama at the 1988 Governor General's Awards. The Cézanne Syndrome, its 1990 translation into English by Louison Danis, was the winner of the Dora Mavor Moore Award for Outstanding New Play, Small Theatre at the 1991 Dora Awards. He also later premiered the theatrical plays Les Jumeaux d'Urantia and Mémoire vive, and a French translation of On Golden Pond. He was a screenwriter for the films Family History (Histoire de famille) and Snowtime! (La Guerre des tuques 3D), and the television series Graffiti and Bob Morane.

As an actor he has been most prominently associated with stage roles in Montreal, and has had supporting roles in film and television. He received a Gémeaux Award nomination for Best Supporting Actor in 1997 for Les Années.
