= Morro and Jasp =

Canadian clown duo

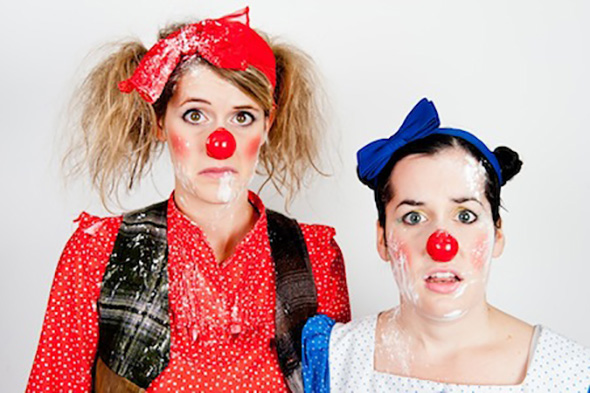
Morro and Jasp

Morro and Jasp are a Canadian clown duo created by Heather Marie Annis, Byron Laviolette and Amy Lee. Based in Toronto, Canada, they produce live theatre productions, web videos, cook books and video games under the banner of U.N.I.T. Productions.

== Awards ==
2012
Dora Mavor Moore Award for "Outstanding Performance" in the Independent theatre category
2014
Canadian Comedy Award for "Best Variety Act"
2016
Gourmand Cookbook Award for "Most Innovative Cookbook" (Eat your heart out with Morro and Jasp. Tightrope. 2013. ISBN 978-1926639727.)
