= Andrew Gurza =

- Born: May 6, 1984 (age 42)
- Education: Carleton University
- Website: www.andrewgurza.com

Andrew Gurza (born May 6, 1984) is a Canadian disability awareness consultant and activist, based in Toronto, who focuses on the intersections of disability and sexuality. Mton University with a Masters in Legal Studies; his thesis was titled "From Paper to Practice: An Examination of How Public Perception of Disability Influences the Mobilization of Rights, Programs and Services for People with Disabilities."

== Work ==
They have written pieces for HuffPost, Everyday Feminism, Men's Health, Los Angeles Times, Out, and them. Gurza has discussed the challenges of ableism in the queer community, disability-inclusive sex education, and barriers to healthcare, such as STI testing. They have also written about the challenges of disabled travelers, particularly the threat of having a wheelchair damaged by airlines.

They are also the co-founder and the Chief Disability Officer of Bump'n, a sex toy company for and by disabled people. He was the subject of an award-winning National Film Board of Canada Documentary Picture This. by Jari Osborne. They are also the host of the podcast Disability After Dark.

In early 2015, Gurza launched Deliciously Disabled consulting. In August 2015, Gurza coorganized the Deliciously Disabled party in Toronto, a sex-positive party for disabled people. The event sold out, but faced backlash in the media, being characterized as an "orgy".

In 2019, Gurza started the hashtag #DisabledPeopleAreHot on Twitter, asking disabled users to post photos of them "feeling sexy, feeling good about themselves and feeling happy and disabled"; the hashtag quickly gained popularity. He later created a second hashtag, #DisabledPeopleAre, to discuss the achievements and challenges of the disabled community more broadly.

=== Picture This ===
Jari Osborne's film, Picture This, follows Gurza, through a series of interviews and conversations with friends, as he co-plans the Second Annual Deliciously Disabled Sex Positive Fully Accessible Play Party. The documentary opens with Gurza sharing a story of his first sexual encounter in which a man admitted to Gurza that he was "just a pity fuck," which Gurza says is a common characterization of disabled people's sexual experiences. However, Gurza maintains that his disability is an important part of his sexuality.

"I like that I’m different. I like that my body is curved. I like that when I’m naked I don’t look normative and I think my disability enhances my sexual identity a lot."

Gurza shares that while most folks, both disabled and not, are hesitant or think it inappropriate to engage in these conversations, for a variety of reasons ranging from fear to ableism.

On a trip to the venue for the Deliciously Disabled event, Gurza and Palikorova reminisce about the success of the first event and consider how to make the upcoming one grander. When the event is eventually canceled, due to low ticket sales, Gurza attributes the decision to not, this time around, use the word "orgy" to describe the event as the reason for the decreased interest. His co-planner, Palikorova, shares that while the decision was made to portray the event as a more refined gathering, it cost them a lot of notoriety. Gurza seconds this by saying that "with disability, it has to be sensationalized or infantilized for it to be newsworthy".

=== Disability After Dark podcast ===
Gurza's podcast Disability After Dark began in 2016 and now has over 300 episodes. Its intention is to "have real conversations about disability, sexuality and everything else about the disability experience that we don't talk about." Most episodes feature a guest speaker with whom Gurza engages with on a myriad of topics relating to the disabled experience. Topics include neurodivergence, porn, caregivers/ing, first dates, queerness, representation, internalized ableism, accommodations, sex work, among others.

=== Bump'n ===
Bump'n is a company that Gurza and their sister, Heather Morrison, founded in 2019 with the intention of making sex toys that are made by and for disabled people. Originally called Handi, playing on the words handjob and handicapped, they changed the name to Bump'n in 2021 following a trademark dispute. Their company hopes not only to provide sexual health products and services by and for disabled people but also to spark a movement to reduce the taboo nature surrounding sex and disability.

Bump'n's website also provides links to blog posts written by Gurza and other authors which include articles titled "Bump'n the Barriers to Bottoming," "How to have great oral sex as a wheelchair user," and "4 Accessible Ways to Ward Off Touch Starvation."

=== The Truth About Being Crippled Blog ===
Gurza's blog The Truth About Being Crippled is another forum to discuss and shine a light on topics not often discussed. Titles include "Harnessing My Sexuality as a Queer Cripple: Becoming My Super, Sexy Self," "Working as a Queer Cripple: My Feelings Around Presenting Sex, Disability and Queerness," and "How I Really Feel About Sex Work and Disability as a Disabled Client."

== Recognition ==
In 2023, Gurza was one of the 10 reader-nominated finalists in the Out100's Reader Choice category.

== Personal life ==
Gurza has cerebral palsy and is a wheelchair user. Gurza came out as gay when they were 15, which their family was supportive of, and also identifies as a "queer cripple". They use they/he pronouns. Gurza is Jewish.

== See also ==
- Infantilization
- Sex positions
- Disability and LGBT identities
- Social model of disability
- Queer theory
- Disability studies
- Queer Crips
- touch starvation
