= Michael Nathanson (director) =

Canadian playwright and theatre director

- Occupations: Playwright, theatre director
- Writing career
- Period: 2000s–present
- Notable work: Talk

Michael Nathanson is a Canadian playwright and theatre director, who was a shortlisted nominee for the Governor General's Award for English-language drama at the 2009 Governor General's Awards for his play Talk.

Nathanson's other plays have included Next, The Seducer’s Diary, One of Ours, No Offense, City of Destiny and an adaptation of Anton Chekhov's Ivanov with the setting transported to Winnipeg.

He served as artistic director of the Winnipeg Jewish Theatre from 2006 to 2014.
