= Anton Piatigorsky =

Canadian author and playwright

- Occupation: Writer
- Spouse: Ava Roth
- Writing career
- Period: 1990s-present

Anton Piatigorsky is an American-Canadian author and playwright.

He was born and raised in the Washington, DC area, and currently lives in Toronto, Ontario. He is an alumnus of Brown University, where he studied theatre and religion.

Piatigorsky has twice received the Dora Mavor Moore Award for Outstanding New Play/Musical in the Independent Theatre category (for "Easy Lenny Lazmon and the Great Western Ascension" in 1999, and for "Eternal Hydra" in 2009. His adaptation of S. An-sky's classic Yiddish play The Dybbuk, was produced at Soulpepper Theatre in 2015. In addition to his solo work as a playwright, Piatigorsky collaborated with composer Brian Current on the opera Airline Icarus, with Piatigorsky writing the libretto.

Piatigorsky was a runner-up for the Danuta Gleed Literary Award in 2012 for his collection of short stories, The Iron Bridge. The collection imagines the adolescent lives of notorious 20th century dictators, including Adolf Hitler, Joseph Stalin and Idi Amin.

Piatigorsky has previously taught Creative Writing at McMaster University.

== Bibliography ==
- Easy Lenny Lazmon and the Great Western Ascension, Playwrights Canada Press, 2000. ISBN 978-0887545887
- Anton Piatigorsky: Two Plays (includes "The Offering" and "The Kabbalistic Psychoanalysis of Adam R. Tzaddik"), Playwrights Canada Press, 2001. ISBN 978-0887546242
- Eternal Hydra, Coach House Books, 2005. ISBN 978-1770560468
- The Iron Bridge, Goose Lane Editions, 2012. ISBN 978-0864927514
- Al-Tounsi, Crowsnest Books, 2019. ISBN 978-0921332602
