= Donna-Michelle St. Bernard =

Canadian playwright and theatre director

- Occupation: playwright
- Writing career
- Period: 2010s - present
- Notable works: Gas Girls, A Man A Fish, Sound of the Beast

Donna-Michelle St. Bernard is a Canadian playwright, theatre director, emcee, and arts administrator. She is a three-time nominee for the Governor General's Award for English-language drama, receiving nods at the 2011 Governor General's Awards for Gas Girls, at the 2016 Governor General's Awards for A Man A Fish, and at the 2020 Governor General's Awards for Sound of the Beast.

Gas Girls also won a Dora Mavor Moore Award in 2010 for Best New Play in the independent theatre division, as well as an Enbridge PlayRites Award from Alberta Theatre Projects, and the Herman Voaden Playwriting Competition. Her other plays have included Cake, The House You Build, and Salome’s Clothes.

Originally from the Grenadines, St. Bernard resides in Hamilton, Ontario. She teaches at the National Theatre School, and is currently the Artistic Director of New Harlem Productions, which is an intercultural, interdisciplinary organization creating work that advances the craft, elevates allies, and engages with communities, employing practices "based on principles of humanity, joyfulness and solidarity."

== Plays ==
- Gas Girls (2011)
- Salome's Clothes
- The House You Build
- Refractions: Solo (co-editor, 2014)
- A Man A Fish(2015)
- Indian Act: Residential School Plays (editor, 2018)
- Cake (2019)
- Sound of the Beast (2020)
- Refractions: Scenes (co-editor, 2020)
