= List of awards and nominations received by Felicity Huffman =

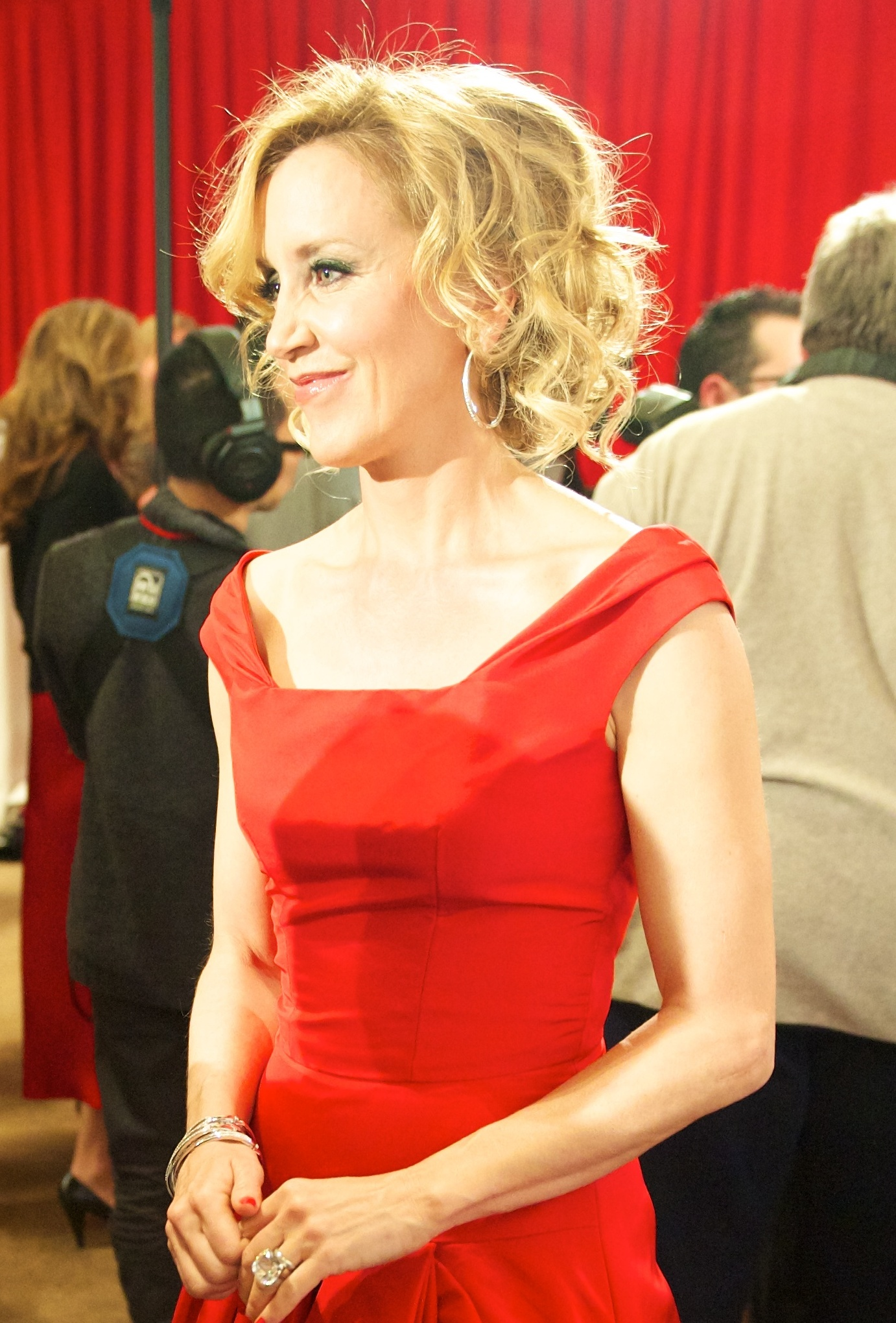
Huffman at The Heart Truth event in 2010

Felicity Huffman has a large and varied body of work as an actor in stage, television and film.

She has received a Primetime Emmy Award, Golden Globe Award, three Screen Actors Guild Awards, and Independent Spirit Award as well as nominations for a Academy Award and a Critics' Choice Movie Award. In 2012 Huffman was inducted into the Hollywood Walk of Fame receiving a star for her contribution to Television — received the 2,463rd star located at 7072 Hollywood, Blvd.

== Major associations ==
=== Academy Award ===
Year	Category	Nominated work	Result	Ref.
2005	Best Actress	Transamerica	Nominated	

=== Critics' Choice Awards ===
Year	Category	Nominated work	Result	Ref.
Critics' Choice Movie Awards
2005	Best Actress	Transamerica	Nominated	
Critics' Choice Television Awards
2015	Best Actress in a Movie/Limited Series	American Crime	Nominated	
2016	Best Actress in a Movie/Limited Series	American Crime	Nominated	

=== Emmy Award ===
Year	Category	Nominated work	Result	Ref.
Primetime Emmy Award
2005	Outstanding Lead Actress in a Comedy Series	Desperate Housewives	Won	
2007	Outstanding Lead Actress in a Comedy Series	Desperate Housewives	Nominated	
2015	Outstanding Lead Actress in a Limited Series or Movie	American Crime	Nominated	
2016	Outstanding Lead Actress in a Limited Series or Movie	American Crime	Nominated	
2017	Outstanding Lead Actress in a Limited Series or Movie	American Crime	Nominated	

=== Golden Globe Award ===
Year	Category	Nominated work	Result	Ref.
1999	Best Actress - Television Series Musical or Comedy	Sports Night	Nominated	
2004	Best Actress - Television Series Musical or Comedy	Desperate Housewives	Nominated	
2005	Best Actress - Television Series Musical or Comedy	Desperate Housewives	Nominated	
2005	Best Actress in a Motion Picture - Drama	Transamerica	Won	
2006	Best Actress - Television Series Musical or Comedy	Desperate Housewives	Nominated	
2015	Best Actress - Miniseries or Television Film	American Crime	Nominated	
2016	Best Actress - Miniseries or Television Film	American Crime	Nominated	

=== Screen Actors Guild Award ===
Year	Category	Nominated work	Result	Ref.
1999	Outstanding Ensemble in a Comedy Series	Sports Night	Nominated	
2004	Outstanding Ensemble in a Comedy Series	Desperate Housewives	Won	
2005	Outstanding Ensemble in a Comedy Series	Desperate Housewives	Won	
2005	Outstanding Female Actor in a Comedy Series	Desperate Housewives	Won	
2005	Outstanding Female Actor in a Leading Role	Transamerica	Nominated	
2006	Outstanding Ensemble in a Comedy Series	Desperate Housewives	Nominated	
2006	Outstanding Female Actor in a Comedy Series	Desperate Housewives	Nominated	
2007	Outstanding Ensemble in a Comedy Series	Desperate Housewives	Nominated	
2008	Outstanding Ensemble in a Comedy Series	Desperate Housewives	Nominated	
2016	Outstanding Female Actor in a Miniseries or Television Movie	American Crime	Nominated	

== Miscellaneous accolades ==
Year	Association	Category	Project	Result	Ref.
1995	Obie Award	Distinguished Performance by an Actress	The Cryptogram	Won	
1999	Viewers for Quality Television Award	Best Actress in a Quality Comedy Series	Sports Night	Nominated	
2000	Viewers for Quality Television Award	Best Actress in a Quality Comedy Series	Sports Night	Nominated	
2004	Satellite Award	Best Actress in a Miniseries or a Television Movie	Out of Order	Nominated	
2005	Austin Film Critics Association	Best Actress	Transamerica	Nominated	
2005	African-American Film Critics Association	Best Actress	Transamerica	Won	
2005	Bangkok International Film Festival	Best Actress	Transamerica	Won	
2005	Chicago Film Critics Association	Best Actress	Transamerica	Nominated	
2005	Dallas–Fort Worth Film Critics Association	Best Actress	Transamerica	Nominated	
2005	Ft. Lauderdale International Film Festival	Best Actress	Transamerica	Won	
2005	Independent Spirit Award	Best Female Lead	Transamerica	Won	
2005	Mill Valley Film Festival	Best Actress	Transamerica	Won	
2005	National Board of Review	Best Actress	Transamerica	Won	
2005	Palm Springs International Film Festival	Breakthrough Performance	Transamerica	Won	
2005	Phoenix Film Critics Society Award	Best Lead Actress	Transamerica	Won	
2005	San Diego International Film Festival	Best Actress	Transamerica	Won	
2005	Satellite Award	Best Actress in a Motion Picture — Drama	Transamerica	Won	
2005	Southeastern Film Critics Association Award	Best Actress	Transamerica	Won	
2005	Tribeca Film Festival	Best Actress in a Narrative Feature	Transamerica	Won	
2005	Vancouver Film Critics Circle Award	Best Actress	Transamerica	Won	
2005	St. Louis Film Critics Association	Best Actress	Transamerica	Nominated	
2005	Washington D.C. Area Film Critics Association	Best Actress	Transamerica	Nominated	
2005	Prism Award	Performance in a Television Movie or Miniseries	Reversible Errors	Nominated	
2005	Satellite Award	Best Actress in a Series — Comedy or Musical	Desperate Housewives	Won	
2005	Prism Award	Performance in a Comedy Series	Desperate Housewives	Nominated	
2007	Satellite Award	Best Actress in a Series — Comedy or Musical	Desperate Housewives	Nominated	
2011	Satellite Award	Best Actress in a Series — Comedy or Musical	Desperate Housewives	Nominated	
2006	Prism Award	Performance in a Feature Film	Georgia Rule	Nominated	
2015	Satellite Award	Best Actress in a Series — Drama	American Crime	Nominated	
2016	Satellite Award	Best Actress in a Series — Drama	American Crime	Nominated	
2015	Women's Image Network Awards	Outstanding Actress Made for Television Movie/Miniseries	American Crime	Nominated	
2019	Canadian Screen Award	Best Supporting Actress	Tammy's Always Dying	Nominated	
