= David Corbett (lawyer) =

Canadian lawyer

David Corbett is a Canadian lawyer who gained international acclaim when, in 2002, he argued Marc Hall v. Durham Catholic School Board, a case that pitted the rights of a homosexual couple against the rights of a religious institution.

Prior to the case Mr. Corbett was a well known gay activist in Ontario arguing numerous cases and publishing many articles for same-sex equality. When the Marc Hall case garnered international attention, Mr. Corbett agreed to take the case pro bono (free of charge).

In 2003, Mr. Corbett was appointed to the Ontario Superior Court.

== Education and background ==
In 1985, Justice David Corbett received a Bachelor of Laws from Osgoode Hall Law School. Then joined the Law Society of Upper Canada in 1987. Prior to being appointed Superior Court Justice he was a partner at Eberts Symes Street Corbett & Pinto where he specialized in the area of civil litigation. He had previously held positions with the Osgoode Hall Law School, the University of Toronto, and the University of Western Ontario. Mr Justice Corbett was also a director of Foundation for Equal Families.

== Marc Hall legal case ==
Marc Hall was a high school student at Oshawa, Ontario's Monsignor John Pereyma Catholic Secondary School who wanted to take his boyfriend to his high school prom in 2002. The case was notable because it pitted the rights of gays and lesbians against the rights of religious institutions. According to BNA Act (1867), S.93 Catholic schools in Ontario were guaranteed special protections to operate according to their religious beliefs free of governmental interference. This, the school district argued, protected the school's right to deny Mr. Hall from taking his boyfriend to the school prom, an act the Catholic Church would consider a sin. Mr Corbett argued that the school, which received public funding, was obligated to obey laws outlawing discrimination, including the Canadian Charter of Rights and Freedoms. Mr Corbett succeeded in winning an injunction against the school that forced it not only to allow Mr Hall to take his boyfriend but forbade the school from cancelling the event.

The injunction did not, however, make any final ruling outside of this particular case in regards to the role of religious freedoms as they relate to the rights of same-sex couples. In 2005, 2 years after David Corbett was appointed Canadian Superior Justice, Mr Hall dropped his pending court case.

== The Hall case in film ==
Director Larry Peloso created a one-hour documentary on the case entitled Prom Fight: The Marc Hall Story. An unrelated television movie, Prom Queen: The Marc Hall Story, aired on CTV in 2004. Aaron Ashmore starred as Hall.
