= Huberdeau =

Huberdeau can mean:

== People ==
- Gustave Huberdeau (1874–1945), a French operatic bass-baritone
- Jonathan Huberdeau (born 1993), Canadian ice hockey player
- Rémy Huberdeau, Canadian filmmaker
- Sébastien Huberdeau (born 1978), an actor from Quebec, Canada

== Places ==
- Huberdeau, Quebec, a village in Canada
