= Anastasia Phillips =

Canadian actress

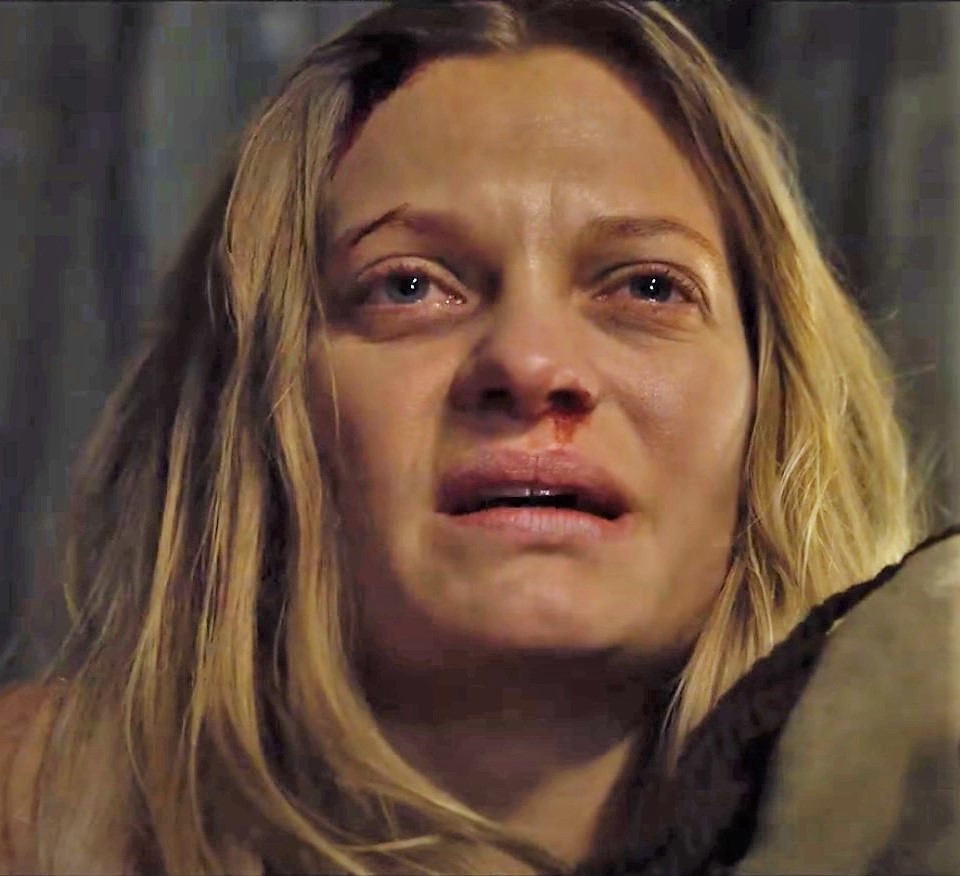
- Anastasia Phillips in Ghostland (2018)
- Born: September 8, 1983 (age 43); Toronto, Ontario, Canada
- Education: University of British Columbia
- Occupation: Actress
- Years active: 2005–present

Anastasia Phillips is a Canadian actress. She appeared in films Don't Talk to Irene (2017), Ghostland (2018) and Tammy's Always Dying (2019), and the TV series Bomb Girls and Reign. In 2021, she began starring in the CBC drama series, Moonshine.

== Life and career ==
Phillips was raised in Etobicoke, Ontario, and obtained her bachelor's degree in Fine Arts from the University of British Columbia. In 2008, she appeared as Tabbi in the TV hockey drama MVP. Her credits include the stageplay The Diary of Anne Frank as the title character, other television roles such as Tina on the MTV show Skins, and as Vera Burr in the wartime drama Bomb Girls. She also voiced Lo Ridgemount on the Fresh TV animated series Stoked. In 2010, Phillips was nominated for Gemini Award for her guest role in Murdoch Mysteries.

In 2013, Phillips was cast in the ABC drama series Lucky 7 as Leanne Maxwell. The series was cancelled after two episodes. She later guest starred on The Mentalist, Grey's Anatomy, and had a recurring role on Reign. She starred in films Don't Talk to Irene (2017) with Geena Davis, Ghostland (2018), and Tammy's Always Dying (2019) opposite Felicity Huffman.

== Filmography ==
=== Film ===
| Year | Title | Role | Notes |
|---|---|---|---|
| 2005 | Fumi and the Bad Luck Foot | Fumi (voice) | Short film |
| 2008 | Nonsense Revolution | Tess | |
| 2012 | Where Are the Dolls | | Uncredited; Short film |
| 2017 | Don't Talk to Irene | Lydia | |
| 2018 | Ghostland | Vera | Also known as Incident in a Ghostland |
| 2019 | Tammy's Always Dying | Catherine | Nominated — ACTRA Award for Outstanding Performance - Female |

=== Television ===
| Year | Title | Role | Notes |
|---|---|---|---|
| 2006 | Cradle of Lies | Snippy Sales Girl | Television film |
| 2007 | Christie's Revenge | Selene Harverston | Television film |
| 2008 | MVP | Tabbi | Main role; 10 episodes |
| 2008 | Sold | Judith | Television film |
| 2009–2013 | Stoked | Lauren Ridgemount (voice) | Main role; 52 episodes |
| 2010 | Blue Mountain State | Monica | Episode: "Drug Olympics" |
| 2010 | The Dating Guy | Debbi (voice) | Episode: "Brother from Another Tanning Booth" |
| 2010 | Murdoch Mysteries | Charlotte | Episode: "Me, Myself and Murdoch"; Nominated — Gemini Award for Best Performance by an Actress in a Guest Role Dramatic Series |
| 2011 | I Hate That I Love You | Heather | Television film |
| 2011 | Skins | Tina Nolan | Recurring role; 4 episodes |
| 2012–2013 | Bomb Girls | Vera Burr | Recurring role; 17 episodes |
| 2013 | Lucky 7 | Leanne Maxwell | Main role; 6 episodes |
| 2014 | Bomb Girls: Facing the Enemy | Vera Burr | Television film |
| 2015 | Murdoch Mysteries | Charlotte | Episode: "The Incurables" |
| 2015 | The Mentalist | Ree Osbourne | Episode: "Byzantium" |
| 2017 | Grey's Anatomy | Marie | Episode: "Leave It Inside" |
| 2017 | Reign | Leeza of Spain | Recurring role; 7 episodes |
| 2019 | Killjoys | Calvert | Episode: "Ship Outta Luck" |
| 2020 | Obsession: Escaping My Ex | Lisa Bransworth | Television film |
| 2020 | Obsession: Her Final Vengeance | Lisa Porter | Television film |
| 2021–2023 | Moonshine | Rhian | Series regular |
| 2024–2026 | The Trades | Audrey | Series regular |
| 2026 | Law & Order Toronto: Criminal Intent | Sarah Nielsen | Episode: "Whole Lotta Love" |
