= Our Spirits Don't Speak English =

2008 film

Our Spirits Don't Speak English (2008) is a documentary film about Native American boarding schools attended by young people mostly from the mid-19th to the mid-20th centuries. It was filmed by the Rich Heape company and directed by Chip Richie. Native American storyteller Gayle Ross narrated the film. Ross is a descendant of John Ross, chief of the Cherokee Nation in the Trail of Tears period.

The film deals with both the schools run by Christian missionaries and those run by the United States' Bureau of Indian Affairs. It addresses the schools' role in forcing cultural assimilation of the resident children into the ways of the majority culture of European Americans.

The School Library Journal's review called it an "outstanding documentary", noting that "viewers are encouraged to develop a deeper appreciation of the importance of transgenerational communication in the survival of Native American identity." Booklist's review called the documentary "enlightening". Indian Country Today called it "a story for everyone".

== See also ==
- Where the Spirit Lives, a 1989 Canadian dramatic film about the Canadian Indian residential school system
- Sleeping Children Awake, a 1992 Canadian documentary about residential schools
- We Were Children, a 2012 Canadian documentary about residential schools
