= Backspot =

Canadian sport drama film

- Theatrical release poster
- Directed by: D. W. Waterson
- Screenplay by: Joanne Sarazen
- Produced by: Martin Katz; Devery Jacobs; D. W. Waterson; Alona Metzer
- Starring: Devery Jacobs; Evan Rachel Wood; Kudakwashe Rutendo; Thomas Antony Olajide; Oluniké Adeliyi; Wendy Crewson; Shannyn Sossamon
- Cinematography: James Poremba
- Edited by: Rémy Huberdeau; D. W. Waterson
- Music by: Casey MQ
- Production companies: Page Boy Productions; Night is Y; Prospero Pictures
- Distributed by: XYZ Films
- Release dates: September 8, 2023 (TIFF); May 31, 2024 (United States)
- Countries: Canada; United States
- Language: English

Backspot is a 2023 drama film directed by D. W. Waterson in their feature-length directorial debut and stars Devery Jacobs, Kudakwashe Rutendo, and Evan Rachel Wood. Jacobs also serves as producer, along with Waterson, through their Night is Y production company.

The film premiered in the Discovery program at the 2023 Toronto International Film Festival.

== Synopsis ==
The plot follows two cheerleaders named Riley and Amanda as they navigate the world of competitive cheerleading.

== Cast ==
- Devery Jacobs as Riley
- Evan Rachel Wood as Eileen McNamara
- Noa DiBerto as Rachel
- Kudakwashe Rutendo as Amanda
- Thomas Antony Olajide as Devon
- Oluniké Adeliyi as Denise
- Wendy Crewson as Suzanne
- Shannyn Sossamon as Tracy
- Adrianna Di Liello as Banigan
- Marlee Sansom as Laila

== Production ==
The project is produced by Page Boy Productions, Night is Y, and Prospero Pictures. It was written by Joanne Sarazen, based on a story by D. W. Waterson. Elliot Page, Matthew Jordan Smith, John Davidson, and Katisha Shaw executive produce, with Alona Metzer, Waterson, Jacobs, and Martin Katz as producers. In December 2023, XYZ Films had acquired the U.S., Australia and New Zealand distribution rights to the film.

In cheerleading, a backspotter acts as a support to the flyer during cheerleading stunts, which is referenced in the title of the project.

=== Casting ===
As well as producing the movie, Jacobs was announced as one of the leads of the film in October 2022. Newcomer Kudakwashe Rutendo was announced as the other lead in February 2023. Evan Rachel Wood was revealed to have joined the production in March 2023.

=== Filming ===
Principal photography began in Toronto in February 2023. It was reported by Collider that filming had wrapped in March 2023.

== Release ==
Backspot was released in the Canada and the United States on May 31, 2024.

== Critical response ==
On the review aggregator website Rotten Tomatoes, 87% of 52 critics' reviews are positive, with an average rating of 7.1/10. The website's consensus reads: "An outstanding showcase for Devery Jacobs, Backspot is front of the line as an insightful and thrilling sports drama."
