= Everest '82 =

- Written by: Keith Ross Leckie
- Directed by: Graeme Campbell
- Starring: Eric Johnson; Jason Priestley; William Shatner
- Theme music composer: Christopher Dedrick
- Country of origin: Canada
- Original language: English

Production
- Producers: Randy Bradshaw; Heather Haldane; Jason Lee; Mary Young Leckie
- Cinematography: Derick V. Underschultz
- Editor: Ralph Brunjes
- Production companies: Alberta Filmworks; Screen Door
- Budget: CAD 10.5 million

Original release
- Network: CBC Television
- Release: December 2007 – December 2007

Everest '82 is a Canadian drama film miniseries directed by Graeme Campbell and written by Keith Ross Leckie. It aired in the fall of 2008 on CBC television and was produced by Alberta Filmworks.

The series is based on the 1990 book Canadians on Everest: The Courageous Expedition of 1982 by Bruce Patterson of the Times-Colonist newspaper.

== Plot ==
Everest '82 tells the true story of the first Canadians to climb Mount Everest.

The film begins with Laurie Skreslet just having lost his best friend in a climbing accident, that happened near Banff. He believes the accident was his fault. The movie then switches to an Everest expedition making its way through the dramatic Nepalese countryside approaching the mountain. The expedition leaders are already fighting, which does little to reassure the conflicted doubts Laurie has about climbing and the guilt he feels over his friend's death.

Once they are on the mountain a huge avalanche kills three of them. Two days later, a collapse of ice crushes another. Everything goes wrong, the media turns against them, the sponsors cut off supplies and tell them to come home, the mountain is too unstable. Because of this half of the climbers leave. As the rest of the climbers are about to go, Laurie reflects on the situation, digging deep within himself to find inspiration and becomes convinced he must go on. He talks a couple of them into continuing up the mountain, inspired by the ghosts of past climbers, their deaths and triumphs.

== Cast ==
- Eric Johnson as Laurie Skreslet
- Jason Priestley as John Lauchlan
- William Shatner as Norman Kelly
- Leslie Hope as Michelle Winegate
- Meredith Henderson as Marlene
- John Pyper-Ferguson as Roger Marshall
- Tom Rooney as Bill March
- Ted Atherton as Eric Paxton
- Zachary Bennett as Blair Griffiths
- Michael Teigen as Dave Read
- Gord Rand as Pat Morrow
- Miguelito Macario Andaluz as Sungdare Sherpa(as Miguelito Macario Andaluz)
