= Where the Spirit Lives =

1989 Canadian television film by Bruce Pittman

- Promotional poster
- Written by: Keith Ross Leckie
- Directed by: Bruce Pittman
- Starring: Michelle St. John; Kim Bruisedhead Fox
- Music by: Buffy Sainte-Marie
- Country of origin: Canada
- Original language: English

Production
- Producers: Heather Haldane; Eric Jordan; Mary Young Leckie
- Cinematography: Rene Ohashi
- Editor: Michael Todd
- Running time: 96 minutes
- Production company: Screen Door
- Budget: $2.6 million

Original release
- Network: CBC Television
- Release: October 29, 1989

Where the Spirit Lives is a 1989 television film about Aboriginal children in Canada being taken from their nations to attend residential schools for assimilation into majority culture. Written by Keith Ross Leckie and directed by Bruce Pittman, it aired on CBC Television on October 29, 1989. It was also shown in the United States on PBS on June 6, 1990, as part of the American Playhouse series and was screened at multiple film festivals in Canada and the United States.

The film stars Michelle St. John as Amelia, a young Kainai girl captured and confined to the residential school system of the 1930s. The system was an attempt to have aboriginal youth to assimilate into the majority European-Canadian culture. Amelia resists assimilation and plans her escape. The film's cast includes Ann-Marie MacDonald and David Hemblen as teachers at the school.

== Plot ==
In 1937, a young Kainai girl named Ashtoh-Komi (Michelle St. John) is kidnapped along with several other children from a village as part of a Canadian policy to educate Aboriginal children and assimilate them into Canadian/British society. She is taken to a boarding school, where she is forced to adopt Western, Eurocentric ways and learn English, often under harsh treatment. Combined with the rejection of her peers (as she is a so-called "Bush Indian" who has not learnt white customs), Komi attempts to escape one night on foot with her little brother, Pita (Clayton Julian). However her plan is quickly foiled as the Indian Agent assigned to the school, Taggert (Ron White), catches up and brings them back to the school, where Komi is subjected to further punishment. Eventually Rachel (Heather Hess), Komi's only ally among the students, plead with the teachers to free her by promising to teach Komi to behave.

One teacher, Kathleen Gwillimbury (Ann-Marie MacDonald), is portrayed as sympathetic and she becomes repelled by the bigotry of others at the school. She offers Komi help in the form of giving her English lessons which culminate in cultural exchange, where Kathleen learns Kainai words from Komi in exchange for her learning their English counterparts. Now Amelia, Komi improves her English quickly with the kindness and support of her teacher, gradually adjusting to the school environment while retaining her Kainai identity. However, when Amelia learns that the teachers lied to her by telling her her parents had died, she decides to escape again, this time successfully.

== Cast ==
- Michelle St. John – Ashtoh-Komi/Amelia
- Kim Bruisedhead Fox – Anataki
- Clayton Julian – Pita/Abraham
- Ron White – Taggert
- Ann-Marie MacDonald – Kathleen Gwillimbury
- Doris Petrie – Miss Weir
- Chapelle Jaffe – Miss Appleby
- David Hemblen – Reverend Buckley
- John Friesen – Mr. Babcock
- Patricia Collins – Mrs. Barrington
- Graham Greene – Komi's father
- Heather Hess – Rachel

== Production ==
The idea for the film originated when the producers and screenwriter were working on the 13-episode CBC television series Spirit Bay, which focused on native children growing up on a Northern Ontario Indian reserve. They "kept hearing bitter stories about residential schools" and were inspired to tell a story about that system in a film.

Primary financing for the film's $2.6 million budget was provided by Telefilm Canada ($1.25 million) and the CBC ($500,000), who secured first rights to the film. Other financing came from the Ontario Film Development Corporation, Mid-Canada TV, and Atlantis Releasing. Canadian film director and producer Norman Jewison "personally contributed $12,500, half the cost of making a theatrical print for film festivals", with the other half supplied by the Ontario Film Development Corp.

The film began shooting on September 26, 1988. Locations included Waterton Lakes National Park in southern Alberta and Toronto.

== Screenings ==
Although created for television, the film was shot in 35 mm and as a result was able to be screened in theaters. It was shown at various film festivals in Canada and the United States from 1989 through 2002. It was also screened at some colleges and universities, as part of college film festivals, classes, or special events related to Indigenous or Native American studies.

Film festival screenings
Date	Festival	Location
1989 September 9	Vancouver International Film Festival	Vancouver, BC
1989 September 13	Toronto International Film Festival	Toronto, ON
1989 September 23	Cinéfest Sudbury International Film Festival	Sudbury, ON
1989 October	Chicago International Film Festival	Chicago, Illinois
1989 October 22, 26, and 28	Greater Fort Lauderdale Film Festival	Fort Lauderdale, FL
1989 November 11	American Indian Film Festival	San Francisco, CA
1990 May 13	Rivertown International Film Festival	Minneapolis–Saint Paul
1990 July 22	Goodwill Film Festival: A Forum of Young Cinema	Seattle
1990 November 1	Greater Fort Lauderdale Film Festival, "Back By Popular Demand" series	Fort Lauderdale, FL
1990 November 10	American Indian Film Festival (repeat screening)	San Francisco, CA
1992 April 30	WorldFest-Houston International Film Festival	Houston, TX
2002 December	The Best of the 27th Annual American Indian Film Festival	Rapid City, SD

== Awards ==
The film won nine awards and was nominated for two additional awards.

Year	Ceremony	Category	Recipient	Result
1989	American Indian Film Festival (San Francisco)	Best Director	Bruce Pittman	Won
1989	Chicago International Film Festival	Television Production – Feature Film Made for TV – Network Special Achievement in Direction (Gold Plaque)	Bruce Pittman	Won
1989	Vancouver International Film Festival	Most Popular Canadian Film (audience award)	Where the Spirit Lives	Won
1989	Greater Fort Lauderdale Film Festival	South Florida Critics Special Jury Prize for Drama	Where the Spirit Lives	Won
1990	Gemini Awards	Best TV Movie	Heather Haldane, Eric Jordan, Mary Young Leckie, and Paul Stephens (producers)	Won
1990	Gemini Awards	Best Performance by a Lead Actress in a Dramatic Program or Mini-Series	Michelle St. John	Won
1990	Gemini Awards	Best Performance by a Supporting Actress	Ann-Marie MacDonald	Won
1990	Gemini Awards	Best Picture Editing in a Dramatic Program or Series	Michael Todd	Won
1990	Gemini Awards	Best Direction in a Dramatic Program or Mini-Series	Bruce Pittman	Nominated
1990	Gemini Awards	Best Writing in a Dramatic Program or Mini-Series	Keith Ross Leckie	Nominated
1990	Lucas International Festival of Films for Children and Young People	Lucas Award	Bruce Pittman	Won

== See also ==
- Sleeping Children Awake, a 1992 documentary about residential schools
- We Were Children, a 2012 Canadian documentary about residential schools
- Our Spirits Don't Speak English (2008), a documentary film about Native American boarding schools in the United States.
