= MVP (TV series) =

Canadian TV soap opera

- Cast of MVP
- Genre: Drama
- Created by: Mary Young Leckie; Kent Staines
- Directed by: T. W. Peacocke; Michel Poulette; Chris Grismer; Stefan Scaini
- Starring: Lucas Bryant; Dillon Casey; Matthew Bennett; Peter Miller; Kristin Booth; Anastasia Phillips; Deborah Odell; Natalie Krill; Olivia Waldriff
- Composer: Gary Koftinoff
- Country of origin: Canada
- Original language: English
- No. of seasons: 1
- No. of episodes: 10 (list of episodes)

Production
- Executive producer: Heather Haldane
- Producer: Mary Young Leckie
- Cinematography: Glenn Warner

Original release
- Network: CBC
- Release: January 11 – March 11, 2008

MVP: The Secret Lives of Hockey Wives (known as Trophy Wives in the United Kingdom) is a 2008 Canadian drama television series that debuted on January 11, 2008 on CBC Television. The series concerns the personal lives of professional hockey players and their wives or girlfriends. According to series co-creator Mary Young Leckie, the show is inspired by, although not a direct adaptation of, the British series Footballers' Wives.

CBC cancelled the program on March 7, 2008, with poor ratings and high production costs cited as reasons. American cable network Soapnet subsequently acquired the show and aired it on June 19, 2008, as did British channel Living TV which aired it on May 4, 2009.

== Premise ==
The show centres on the lives and loves of the Canadian Mustangs, a fictional professional hockey team. The death of veteran captain Adam McBride brings many changes in store for the team and others connected: Gabe McCall, the coach's son, becomes the team captain; a naïve rookie sensation named Trevor Lemonde is controversially added to the team; and Evelyn, McBride's widow, must adjust to a new lifestyle in the wake of her husband's death.

== Cast ==
- Lucas Bryant as Gabe McCall
- Dillon Casey as Trevor Lemonde
- Matthew Bennett as Malcolm LeBlanc
- Peter Miller as Damon Trebuche
- Kristin Booth as Connie
- Anastasia Phillips as Tabbi
- Deborah Odell as Evelyn McBride
- Natalie Krill as Molly
- Olivia Waldriff as Grace Morris
- Amanda Brugel as Megan Chandler
- Alec McClure as Owen Chandler
- Charlotte Sullivan as Mandy
- Steven Yaffee as Donald
- Deanna Dezmari as Katrina

== Production ==
The Screen Door production began filming in 2006 in the Toronto, London and Hamilton, Ontario areas. The show generated wide interest before its premiere, particularly from the National Hockey League itself as executives were concerned that the series' purportedly racy content would create a negative image for the league. The budget for the first ten episodes was approximately $14 million.

== Episodes ==
No.	Title	Directed by	Written by	Original release date
1	"Game On"	T. W. Peacocke	Kent Staines & Sherry White	January 11, 2008
After the sudden death of the Mustangs' star centre, the team acquires the league's number one draft pick Trevor Lemonde.
2	"Truth and Consequence"	T. W. Peacocke	Kent Staines & Sherry White	January 18, 2008
Trevor becomes acquainted with Molly McBride; Damon's rape charge impacts Connie and Gabe's relationship.
3	"Cover Your Man"	T. W. Peacocke	Kent Staines & Sherry White	January 25, 2008
Tabbi comes into town and disrupts the relationship between Trevor and Molly.
4	"Two for Interference"	T. W. Peacocke	Kent Staines & Sherry White	February 1, 2008
Damon sets up a rookie initiation with his Mustang teammates for Trevor.
5	"Double Over Time"	T. W. Peacocke	Kent Staines & Sherry White	February 5, 2008
Trevor's life gets complicated when his agent hires stylists to give him a makeover and the scheming Molly strikes up a friendship with Trevor's girlfriend Tabbi.
6	"Trades and Rumours"	T. W. Peacocke	Kent Staines & Sherry White	February 12, 2008
Connie fears she may lose Gabe when a new coach is hired and rumours of a trade run rampant.
7	"The Code"	T. W. Peacocke	Tim Kilby	February 19, 2008
With the team on the road, all hell breaks loose when Trevor goes wild with the puckbunnies. Molly turns 18 and finally discovers the secret of the key.
8	"Reality Check"	T. W. Peacocke	Sherry White	February 26, 2008
The Mustangs' world is turned upside down when Damon seriously injures another player on the ice. Meanwhile, Molly goes missing and everyone's a suspect, including her mother, the distraught Evelyn.
9	"Sudden Death"	Stefan Scaini	Tim Kilby	March 4, 2008
Just as they are preparing to play a game, the Mustangs find themselves held hostage by an enraged Donald.
10	"Mad Scramble"	T. W. Peacocke	Kent Staines	March 11, 2008
Desperate to find Molly as the police search goes nowhere, Evelyn turns to a psychic for help to find her missing daughter.

== Release ==
=== United States ===
MVP premiered on June 19, 2008 on Soapnet. In addition, it had a special promotional airing on June 20, 2008 on ABC after the Daytime Emmy Awards, where it was the lowest-rated Big Four network program of the week. The promotional subtitle in the United States was changed to "He Shoots, She Scores".

=== United Kingdom ===
Digital broadcaster Living TV secured the rights to MVP in the UK, but only showed four episodes after airing the first episode on May 4, 2009. The series has been retitled Trophy Wives for the British market. After Living Loves rebranded to Sky Living Loves in January 2011, episodes were re-aired (including those not previously broadcast on Living TV) every Thursday and Saturday.

== Critical reception ==
Writing for Variety, critic Brian Lowry said MVP "is a passable nighttime soap — using hockey (!) as a slick backdrop to its bed-hopping shenanigans. The first hour alone features every imaginable serial cliche, from a sudden death to the sex-tape-making stud and the spoiled rich girl who says, 'You work for me. Now take your pants off!'" Chris Jancelewicz of AOL.com wrote, "It's the women of the show, though, that are the real MVPs", citing the performances of Booth and Odell.
