= Prom Queen: The Marc Hall Story =

- Genre: Biographical drama
- Written by: Michael MacLennan
- Directed by: John L'Ecuyer
- Starring: Aaron Ashmore
- Music by: Gary Koftinoff
- Country of origin: Canada
- Original language: English

Production
- Producer: Heather Gordon Haldane
- Cinematography: Glenn Warner
- Editor: Mike Lee
- Running time: 92 minutes
- Production company: Screen Door

Original release
- Network: CTV Television Network
- Release: 1 June 2004

Prom Queen: The Marc Hall Story is a 2004 Canadian biographical drama television film directed by John L'Ecuyer and written by Michael MacLennan. Aaron Ashmore stars as Marc Hall, a gay Canadian teenager whose legal fight (Marc Hall v. Durham Catholic School Board) to bring a same-sex date to his Catholic high school prom made headlines in 2002. The film aired on CTV on 1 June 2004.

== Plot ==
In Inniston, Marc Hall is popular and his sexuality relatively well-accepted by his classmates and later his parents. However, when he decides to take his boyfriend to the prom as his date, he finds he has stepped over the line straight into the fight of his young life and sends ripples through Canada's media. From being just an ordinary teenager, he becomes an icon for LGBT rights across the nation when he discovers he is battling discrimination to date whomever he wants within the spotlight of the nation's media.

== Cast ==
- Aaron Ashmore as Marc Hall
- Mac Fyfe as Jason
- Tamara Hope as Carly
- Trevor Blumas as Beau
- Dave Foley as Principal Warrick
- Fiona Reid as the school board chief
- Laura Vandervoort as Young Girl (uncredited)
- Jean-Pierre Bergeron as Andy Hall
- Marie Tifo as Emily Hall

== Production ==
The offices of Toronto-based Tapestry Pictures were vandalised one week before the film's television premiere, and the producers feared the vandalism was linked to its controversial film it was about to release. It was shown on terrestrial TV on CTV on 1 June 2004.

== Theatrical adaptation ==
A musical adaptation of Prom Queen entitled The Louder We Get directed by Lonny Price with songs by Colleen Dauncey and lyrics by Akiva-Romer Segal premiered in January 2020 at Theatre Calgary after a developmental production in September 2018 in London, Ontario. Selections were featured in the 2017 NAMT festival in New York.
