= Fanboy Confessional =

Canadian documentary series

- Genre: Documentary
- Created by: Michael McNamara
- Narrated by: Aaron Ashmore
- Opening theme: by The von Drats
- Composer: Kurt Swinghammer
- Country of origin: Canada
- Original language: English
- No. of seasons: 1
- No. of episodes: 6

Production
- Executive producer: Judy Holm
- Production locations: Canada; United States
- Running time: 22 minutes

Original release
- Network: Space
- Release: July 13 – July 27, 2011

Fanboy Confessional is a Canadian documentary series exploring fan subcultures. Subjects of the series have included Cosplay, Furries, LARP, Steampunk, and Real-life Superheroes. Created by Toronto based production company Markham Street Films, the series currently airs on Space.

== Episodes ==
No.	Title	Original release date	Prod. code
1	"The Cosplay Edition"	July 13, 2011	101
A group of Cosplayers prepare their costumes for the upcoming Anime North Convention.
2	"The Steampunk Edition"	July 13, 2011	102
Steampunk groups on the east and west coasts show off their Victorian styles and steam-powered gadgets.
3	"The Real Life Superhero Edition"	July 20, 2011	103
Superheroes are more than a hobby for Real Life Super Heroes. Watch them help their community and even fight crime using their ingenuity and creativity.
4	"The Monster Chiller Horror Edition"	July 20, 2011	104
These dedicated monster and horror fans are organized, numerous, and they're invading a city near you. The Toronto Zombie Walk is coming up and these creatures need to prepare.
5	"The Furry Edition"	July 27, 2011	105
An Ontario Furry group throws their first convention, and this diverse group explains what it really means to be a furry.
6	"The LARPer Edition"	July 27, 2011	106
Interviews with Live Action Role Players new and old, and an overview of this full-immersion form of role playing, featuring footage from Underworld Toronto.
