= Alex House =

Canadian actor

- Born: Alexander Charles Albert House; December 11, 1986 (age 39); Toronto, Ontario, Canada
- Occupation: Actor
- Years active: 1999–present

Alexander Charles Albert House (born December 11, 1986) is a Canadian actor best known for his Gemini Award winning role in the television series Todd and the Book of Pure Evil.

== Early life ==
House was born and raised in Toronto, Ontario, Canada.

== Career ==
House started his career as a child actor, beginning when a friend's mother introduced him to an agent. Among many others credits he played a recurring guest star role as Tim on the fifth season of the Canadian TV series Degrassi: The Next Generation and Lance Stone (as well as his alter ego, Blaze) on Dark Oracle. House guest-starred on many Canadian series such as Corner Gas and Life with Derek.

House's most notable role is Todd Smith in the Canadian television series Todd and the Book of Pure Evil for Space Channel. House and his co-stars were awarded a Gemini Award for Best Ensemble Performance in a Comedy Program or Series in August 2011.

== Filmography ==
=== Film ===
Year	Title	Role	Notes
2001	The Safety of Objects	Jake Train	
2002	Between Strangers	Kevin	
2003	Rescue Heroes: The Movie	Brent	Voice
2007	Full of It	Kyle Sidekick #1	
2007	Late Fragment	Jacob	
2008	Nonsense Revolution	Kaz	
2010	Toiretto	Ray	
2016	Total Frat Movie	Billy Taylor	
2017	Sebastian	Sebastian	
2017	Todd and the Book of Pure Evil: The End of the End	Todd Smith (voice)	Animated feature film
2021	Awake	Scarred Soldier	

=== Television ===
Year	Title	Role	Notes
1999	Total Recall 2070	Taavo Soodor	2 episodes
1999	Earth: Final Conflict	Jessie	Episode: "Defector"
1999	Psi Factor	Michael Byrne	Episode: "Forever and a Day: Part 1"
1999	The Wonderful World of Disney	Kid at Arcade	Episode: "Switching Goals"
2000	Harlan County War	Buddy Kincaid	Television film
2000	Out of Sync	Teen	Television film
2000	Twice in a Lifetime	Billy – Age 12	Episode: "It's a Hard Knock Life"
2000–2001	Redwall	Sam / Tim Churchmouse	13 episodes
2001	Life with Judy Garland: Me and My Shadows	Joe (11–15 yrs)	2 episodes
2001	The Zack Files	Jeb McFadden	Episode: "Blast from the Past"
2002	Screech Owls	Slava Virnov	Episode: "Kidnapped in Tamarack"
2002–2003	Beyblade	Ozuma / Mr. X	38 episodes
2003	Betrayed	Adam	Television film
2003	Wild Card	Ted	Episode: "Pilot"
2004–2006	Dark Oracle	Lance Stone / Blaze	26 episodes
2005	Jesse Stone: Stone Cold	Kevin Feeney	Television film
2005–2006	Degrassi: The Next Generation	Tim	3 episodes
2006	Jane and the Dragon	Jethro 'Smithy' Junior	26 episodes
2006	Corner Gas	Kyle	Episode: "Just Brent and His Shadow"
2006	Life with Derek	Trevor	Episode: "The Bet"
2008	A Woman's Rage	Scott Brown	Television film
2009	Warehouse 13	Greg Permut	Episode: "Nevermore"
2010	Bloodletting & Miraculous Cures	Todd	Episode: "How to Get Ahead in Medical School"
2010	The Dating Guy	Trip Clovis	Episode: "Brother from Another Tanning Booth"
2010–2012	Todd and the Book of Pure Evil	Todd Smith	26 episodes
2011	Breakout Kings	Justin	Episode: "Paid in Full"
2012	Rookie Blue	Bobby Love	Episode: "Leap of Faith"
2013	Transporter: The Series	The Joker	Episode: "Give the Guy a Hand"
2013	Total Drama All-Stars	Alejandro, Jose	11 episodes
2020	Murdoch Mysteries	Mooney	Episode: "Parker in the Rye"
2021	Mayor of Kingstown	Brandon Miles	Episode: "Along Came a Spider"
