= Kudakwashe Rutendo =

Canadian actress

Kudakwashe Rutendo is a Canadian actress, most noted for her starring role as Amanda in the 2023 film Backspot.

Born in Calgary, Alberta, and raised in Fort McMurray, she attended the University of Toronto, studying English, philosophy and classics while pursuing acting classes as a secondary pursuit. She secured a contract with an agent in March 2020 just days before the COVID-19 pandemic shut down the industry, and had acting roles in the television series Fear Thy Roommate, the short films The Second Hand and Love Bites, and the television films Bad Influence and Giving Hope: The Ni'cola Mitchell Story, before being cast in Backspot.

Backspot premiered at the 2023 Toronto International Film Festival, where she was named one of the festival's Rising Stars.

She appeared in the 2024 edition of Canada Reads, advocating for Téa Mutonji's short story collection Shut Up You're Pretty.
