= Joanne Sarazen =

Canadian actress and writer

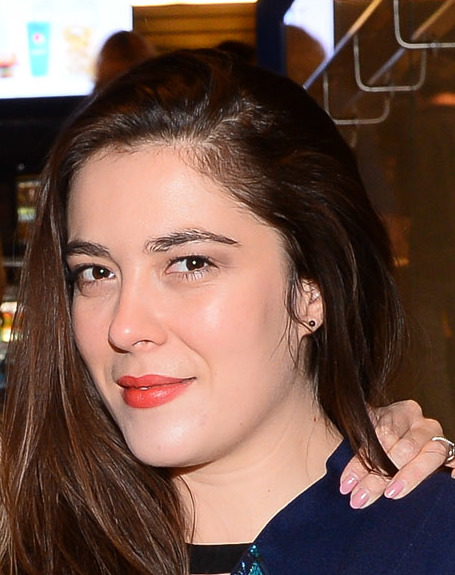
- Born: Ottawa, Ontario, Canada
- Occupations: Actress, screenwriter
- Years active: 1996–present

Joanne Sarazen is a Canadian actress and writer. She is most noted as co-writer with Sook-Yin Lee of the 2024 film Paying for It, for which they won the Canadian Screen Award for Best Adapted Screenplay at the 13th Canadian Screen Awards in 2025.

Originally from Ottawa, Ontario, she began her career as a stage actress and playwright in Montreal, Quebec, with her plays including Jesus Jell-O, The Ronda M. Leacock Memorial Beauty Pageant, Miss Ellen Q, and The Doll Play.

She studied screenwriting at the Canadian Film Centre in 2017. Her first screenplay, Tammy's Always Dying, was directed by Amy Jo Johnson and premiered at the 2019 Toronto International Film Festival.

Her second screenplay, Backspot, was directed by D. W. Waterson and premiered at the 2023 Toronto International Film Festival, and Paying for It premiered at the 2024 Toronto International Film Festival.
