= Nonsense Revolution =

- Directed by: Ann Verrall
- Written by: Ann Verrall
- Produced by: Thom Fitzgerald and Doug Pettigrew
- Starring: Robert Clark; Alex House; Anastasia Phillips; Deborah Allen; Heather Rankin
- Release date: September 18, 2008 (Atlantic Film Festival)
- Running time: 83 minutes
- Country: Canada
- Language: English

Nonsense Revolution is a 2008 Canadian Comedy drama written and directed by Ann Verrall, starring Alex House, Anastasia Phillips, Robert Clark and Deborah Allen.

== Synopsis ==
Nonsense Revolution is about a group of friends who were partying one night. In a terrible accident, Kaz (Alex House), one of the group dies in a "hit and run" accident.

About a year later, Kaz returns with angel wings (but is not saintly at all). He "haunts" one of the friends called Tess (Anastasia Phillips) and appears only to her but remains invisible to all the others. He tells Tess to arrange the gathering of the group together on the anniversary of his death. An awkward atmosphere develops as Kaz "plays" around with the group sexually arousing them by touching them with his feathers and making them engage in various heterosexual and homosexual acts with each other.

== Cast ==
- Alex House as Kaz
- Anastasia Phillips as Tess
- Robert Clark as Tom
- Deborah Allen as Curtis' ancestor
- Loretta Yu as Nora
- Seamus Morrison as Logan
- Gregory Penney as Curtis
- Krista MacDonald as Police constable
- Adrian Comeau as Bo
- Shauna Bradley as Mia
- Jordan Munn as Will Mac
- Keelin Jack as Adriana
- Michael McPhee as Jimmy
- Todd Godin as Police constable
- Curtis' ancestors played by
  - Heather Rankin
  - James Milligan
  - Michael Pellerin
  - Lisa Fennell
  - Novalea Buchan

== Production ==
The film was shot in Halifax, Nova Scotia and the surrounding area making use of the tax credit scheme for shooting locally in place at the time.

== See also ==
- List of LGBT films directed by women
