= Laurie Skreslet =

Canadian mountaineer

- Born: October 25, 1949 (age 76)
- Occupation: Mountain Climbing
- Years active: 1970–present
- Known for: Being the first Canadian to summit Mount Everest
- Notable work: To the Top of Everest(book)

Laurie Skreslet (born October 25, 1949) is a Canadian mountaineer best known for his ascent of Mount Everest.

On October 5, 1982, at 9:30am local time, Skreslet became the first Canadian to reach the summit of Mount Everest, via the southeast col route. The 1982 Canadian Mount Everest Expedition (sponsored by Air Canada) had taken five years to plan, $3 million to finance and required 27 tons of equipment to outfit the party. The expedition also experienced tragedy when four climbers perished in the Khumbu Icefall during setup of Camp I.

== Biography ==
Laurie Skreslet was raised as an only child in Calgary, Alberta. At the age of 16 he left home and 2 years later was introduced to mountain climbing in 1970. Within two years Skreslet became a member of a successful expedition to Peru's highest mountain Huascaran. Over the years he became an expert in rock climbing, ice climbing, working in high altitudes, and Alpine climbing. As a result, he decided to become an instructor at Colorado and Canadian outward bound Mountain Schools.

== Expeditions ==
Skreslet, a very strong mountain climber, went to climb in Nepal in 1982, reaching the summit of Mount Everest (29,028 ft. above sea level) in October of that year. In the fall of 1987 Skreslet attempted to climb the north face of Kanchenjunga (28,169 ft. above sea level) but didn't quite accomplish it. Skreslet has led class expeditions to the Canadian Rockies, Nepal, South America and India. Other mountains Skreslet has climbed in his journey were in the North American Rockies, South American Andes and Asian Himalayas. Since his journey up Mt. Everest in 1982, he has returned five times. During his journey on Mt. Everest, the only injury he received was three broken ribs, even though other mountain climbers have died trying to climb the mountain.

== See also ==
- List of 20th-century summiters of Mount Everest
- Everest '82
