= Ghostland =

2018 film directed by Pascal Laugier

- Directed by: Pascal Laugier
- Written by: Pascal Laugier
- Produced by: Clément Miserez; Jean-Charles Levy; Matthieu Warter; Nicolas Manuel; Ian Dimerman; Scott Kennedy; Sami Tesfazghi; Brendon Sawatzky
- Starring: Crystal Reed; Anastasia Phillips; Emilia Jones; Taylor Hickson; Mylène Farmer
- Cinematography: Danny Nowak
- Edited by: Dev Singh
- Music by: Todd Bryanton
- Production companies: 5656 Films; Mars Films; Logical Pictures; Inferno Pictures; Highwire Pictures; Kinology; Radar Films
- Release dates: 3 February 2018 (Gérardmer); 14 March 2018 (France); 22 June 2018 (United States)
- Running time: 91 minutes
- Countries: Canada; France
- Language: English

Ghostland (also known as Incident in a Ghostland) is a 2018 psychological horror film written and directed by Pascal Laugier. Ghostland was shown in competition at the Festival international du film fantastique de Gérardmer, where it won three awards, including the Grand Prize. The film is a co-production between Canada and France.

== Plot ==
A woman named Pauline travels with her teenage daughters Beth and Vera to their recently deceased aunt Clarisse's secluded home after they inherited it in her will. Beth reads an article about a string of home invasions where parents are murdered, but daughters are spared. Unbeknownst to the family, they are being stalked by someone driving a candy truck.

Shortly after they settle into the house, two intruders - a large, mentally impaired man known as the Fat Man and a man presenting as a female known as the Candy Truck Woman - break in and attack the family. Vera is raped by the Fat Man, while Beth tries to escape, but is accosted by the Woman. When Beth asks what she wants, the Candy Truck Woman replies, "We just wanna play with dolls." Pauline then kills both intruders.

Sixteen years later, Beth is a successful horror fiction author living in Chicago with her husband and son. She appears on a talk show to promote her new novel Incident in a Ghostland, which is based on the events of that night. She receives a frantic phone call from Vera begging her to return to Clarisse's house, where she still lives with Pauline. When Beth arrives, Pauline explains that Vera has been unable to recover from the trauma and has suffered from delusions since the incident, locking herself in a padded room in the basement. Beth begins to have strange dreams, while Vera claims that their tormentors are still trying to find them.

During an episode, Beth finds Vera in chains, made up to look like a doll. Pauline calls an ambulance and tells Beth not to listen to Vera. Beth falls asleep and is captured by the Candy Truck Woman. She awakens to discover bruises all over her face, and finds Vera also visibly injured in the basement. Beth blames her for both of their wounds. Vera implores her sister face the truth, whereupon is revealed that the Candy Truck Woman actually killed Pauline that night—Beth and Vera are still teenagers being held captive in Clarisse's house, and Beth's entire adult life has been a hallucination.

The Candy Truck Woman dresses Beth like a doll and leaves her in a room littered with dolls, which the Fat Man molests and breaks. When he attacks Beth, she fights back and flees. She frees Vera and they escape the house. They make it to a road where two state troopers help them, reporting the incident to dispatch. However, both are gunned down by the Candy Truck Woman, who recaptures the girls.

Beth mentally retreats to her adulthood fantasy. At a cocktail party, she meets her idol, H.P. Lovecraft, who tells her that her novel is a masterpiece. Beth sees Vera screaming for help, and decides to return to rescue her. She escapes from the Fat Man and violently confronts the Candy Truck Woman. Another state trooper arrives in time to gun down both the Fat Man and the Candy Truck Woman. After authorities arrive, Beth sees a vision of her mother waving at them from the house as she and Vera are taken to a hospital.

== Cast ==
- Crystal Reed as Elizabeth "Beth" Keller
  - Emilia Jones as young Beth
- Anastasia Phillips as Vera Keller
  - Taylor Hickson as young Vera
- Mylène Farmer as Pauline Keller
- Kevin Power as Candy Truck Woman
- Rob Archer as "Fatman Nizar"
- Paul Titley as H.P. Lovecraft

== Production ==
Ghostland is a Canadian and French co-production with Canada providing 69.12% of funding and France providing 30.88%. The film was predominantly shot in Canada.

=== Accident ===
In December 2016, actress Taylor Hickson was facially disfigured while shooting a scene for the film. She was rushed to the hospital and received 70 stitches but was permanently scarred. In March 2018, Hickson sued the film's production company Incident Productions over lost work as a result of the incident. Hickson claimed in the lawsuit that "in the course of shooting the scene, the director Pascal Laugier, consistently told Hickson to pound harder on the glass with her fists". While filming another take, the lawsuit stated:

The glass shattered, causing [her] head and upper body to fall through the door and shards of glass. As a result of the incident, [she] badly cut the left side of her face.

Hickson, in the lawsuit, stated that the company failed to take "any and all reasonable steps to ensure that industry standards and practices were adhered to, including but not limited to the use of safety glass and/or stunt doubles as appropriate".

Independent of the pending lawsuits, the Winnipeg-based film company Incident Productions, Inc. pled guilty for "failing to ensure the safety and welfare of a worker under the Workplace Safety and Health Act", and was fined $40,000 by the province of Manitoba.

== Release ==
Ghostland was first shown in competition on 3 February 2018 at the Festival international du film fantastique de Gérardmer. Ghostland won three film awards at the festival, including the Grand Prize, Audience Award, and the SyFy Award. The SyFy award was chosen by five bloggers at the festival. Frédéric Strauss of Télérama noted that this was the second French co-production in a row that dominated the awards at the festival with the previous years big winner being Raw by Julia Ducournau. The film received a theatrical release in France on 14 March 2018. In some territories, the film was released as Ghostland and in others as Incident in a Ghostland.

== Reception ==
On review aggregator Rotten Tomatoes, the film holds an approval rating of 55%, based on 29 reviews with an average rating of 6/10. The site's critics' consensus reads: "Incident in a Ghost Land may satisfy horror fans in search of a nasty kick, but it's narratively flawed and decidedly not for the squeamish." Metacritic gives the film a weighted average score of 44 out of 100, based on 4 critics, indicating "mixed or average reviews".

The Hollywood Reporter declared the film to be a "taut—if somewhat corny—slasher flick" and it was "neither for the faint of heart nor the sharp of mind". The review noted the dialogue, finding that "for [the director's] second film in English after 2012's The Tall Man, he could have brushed up more on his dialogue, which rings awfully flat." Dennis Harvey of Variety declared that Ghostland "all seems slick, intense, and unpleasant in the same hollow way "Martyrs" did, because all the cruelty is so meaningless. Replacing that film's empty pseudo-mysticism are villains for whom Laugier doesn't bother providing any motivation or backstory." Simon Abrams of The Village Voice wrote that the film was a "disturbing and effective critique of misogynist torture porn," it "may sometimes play like a mindlessly gory slasher clone, but Laugier’s tormented girls consistently prove to be stronger than their brutalized bodies."
