= The Thaw (2009 film) =

- Film poster
- Directed by: Mark A. Lewis
- Written by: Mark A. Lewis; Michael Lewis
- Produced by: Trent Carlson; Rob Neilson; Mary Anne Waterhouse
- Starring: Val Kilmer; Martha MacIsaac; Kyle Schmid; Steph Song; Aaron Ashmore
- Production companies: Anagram Pictures Inc. Brightlight Pictures; Voltage Pictures
- Distributed by: Lionsgate Ghost House Underground (United States); Maple Pictures (Canada)
- Release date: August 30, 2009 (Nuremberg Fantasy Filmfest)
- Countries: United States; Canada
- Language: English

The Thaw is a 2009 American science fiction horror thriller film directed by Mark A. Lewis and starring Val Kilmer, Martha MacIsaac, and Aaron Ashmore.

== Plot ==
The film begins with a video documentary by Dr. David Kruipen (Val Kilmer), a research scientist on Banks Island, in the Canadian Arctic and the outbreak of a pandemic, with 400 dead and 10,000 infected. This is followed by a flashback to when David, his assistant Jane (Anne Marie DeLuise) and two other researchers tranquilize a polar bear, then discover the frozen remains of a woolly mammoth.

They transport the polar bear to their research station. David calls his daughter Evelyn (Martha MacIsaac) and pleads with her to visit the research station. Their relationship has been strained since the recent death of her mother. Meanwhile, a group of students, Ling (Steph Song), Federico (Kyle Schmid) and Atom (Aaron Ashmore), are selected to join David's research team; Evelyn decides to come.

Days later, David's research team begins feeling the effects of a strange illness, and David tells helicopter pilot Bart not to bring his daughter Evelyn to the station. However, Evelyn insists, leaving Bart no choice but to bring her to the station along with the students. In the meantime, Jane shoots and apparently kills David and another researcher. The students discover the body of the polar bear, and Bart is bitten by a bug while touching it.

Evelyn is awakened in the middle of the night by an all-terrain vehicle approaching the station. When Evelyn investigates, she discovers Jane in the helicopter. Jane has destroyed the helicopter's control panel, eliminating any immediate chance of escape. Ling wakes up with many bug bites on her face and torso, and Jane dies in Evelyn's arms. Realizing Ling is sick, Federico calls in a helicopter to rescue Ling.

Attempting to find David, Evelyn and Atom discover eggs in the brain of the mammoth. Assuming her father has been infected, Evelyn and Atom deduce that something has made the group sick. Evelyn decides to cancel the rescue helicopter and quarantine the group until a better-prepared team can rescue them. Federico, discovering he too is infected, goes berserk and destroys the radio.

The bite on Bart's arm is infected and he has Atom and Evelyn amputate his arm at the elbow. The group decides to destroy the facility and wait things out in the helicopter. Ling is attacked by bugs who have made their way in through the ventilation system. Bart discovers that the amputation was useless as his upper arm is now showing signs of infection; he opts to stay behind with Ling. They deliberately overdose on morphine and fall asleep as the bugs swarm over them.

Federico comes running out, refusing to be checked for infection, then turns on Evelyn and Atom. As he is about to shoot Evelyn, he is shot from behind by David. David insists they destroy the research station. Evelyn finds a video David recorded and discovers that David has intentionally infected himself, preparing to set the bugs loose to teach humanity a lesson about global warming's effects.

As a rescue helicopter comes to pick up David, Evelyn and Atom are locked up by David, but they escape. Atom grabs one of the helicopter’s skids to attempt to make the helicopter land, but falls to the ground after being shaken off by the pilot’s attempts to stabilise it, and is mortally injured. As the helicopter starts flying away, Evelyn shoots at it, causing it to crash into a building previously doused in gasoline. David and the helicopter crew die in the resulting fire; Evelyn finds Atom, who dies in her arms.

The following day another rescue team arrives, finding the destruction and Evelyn, the sole survivor. Later, as a radio station airs information based on Evelyn's reports, a hunter calls his dog away from a dead bird the dog has been eating. Bugs emerge from the bird's body, which was infected from eating the mammoth. The closing scene shows the hunter's truck heading towards a large city.

== Cast ==
- Martha MacIsaac as Evelyn, Dr. Krupien's daughter
- Aaron Ashmore as Atom, a student, Evelyn's love interest
- Kyle Schmid as Federico, a student with a severe phobia of insects
- Steph Song as Ling, a smart, assertive student who is trying to dispel rumors of her promiscuity
- Val Kilmer as Dr. David Kruipen, the leader of the expedition
- Viv Leacock as Bart, as a helicopter pilot & Dr. Kruipen's friend.
- Anne Marie Loder as Jane
- John Callander as Edward, Dr. Kruipen's co-worker
- Lamech Kadloo as Nuti, Dr. Kruipen's co-worker
- Sebastian Gacki as Chad, Evelyn's friend
- Alejandro Rae as Rob, Bart's co-worker

== Reception ==
The film has received generally poor reviews. Scott "Foywonder" Foy of Dread Central gave the film 2 out of 5 knives, claiming it "appears to borrow a tremendous amount of its plot from The X-Files. There was a good movie here that lost its way."

== See also ==
- "Ice", the eighth episode of The X-Files, also dealing with a deadly parasite unleashed on an Arctic research station.
- Series 1 of "Fortitude", the Sky Atlantic thriller, dealt with a similar theme of deadly, prehistoric bugs being released from the remains of a frozen mammoth.
