= Loretta Yu =

Canadian actor of Chinese descent (born 1982)

- Born: December 22, 1982 (age 42); Montreal, Quebec, Canada
- Education: Acadia University (BA)
- Occupation: Actress

Loretta Yu (born December 22, 1982) is a Canadian actress of Chinese descent.

== Early life ==
Yu was born in Montreal, Quebec, and grew up in Nova Scotia, working in her family's restaurant. Yu received a Bachelor of Arts degree in theatre from Acadia University.

== Career ==
Yu took part in some Halifax productions, including Jason Eisener's fake trailer for Hobo with a Shotgun which was screened with the film Grindhouse and Jay Dahl's film There are Monsters. Yu moved to Toronto and appeared in various television series including Degrassi: The Next Generation, The Listener, Hemlock Grove and Blood and Water. She also appeared in the 2008 made-for-television movie The Circuit and the 2008 Canadian comedy Nonsense Revolution. In 2017 and 2018, Yu played Ana in the Canadian web-series Begin/Again. From 2017 to 2019, Yu played Cai in Dino Dana.

She appeared in an episode of the 2021 drama series Cam Boy.

== Filmography ==
=== Film ===
Year	Title	Role	Notes
2007	Just Buried	Patricia	
2008	Nonsense Revolution	Nora	
2013	Enemy	Receptionist	Uncredited
2013	There Are Monsters	Teacher	
2014	Pretend We're Kissing	Lily	

=== Television ===
Year	Title	Role	Notes
2005	Mom at Sixteen	Student	Television film
2005	The Hunt for the BTK Killer	Debbie	Television film
2005	Trudeau II: Maverick in the Making	Chinese Woman	Television film
2005	Vampire Bats	Lizzie's Friend	Television film
2006	Fatal Desire	Waitress	Television film
2006	North/South	Becca	4 episodes
2008	The Circuit	Deanne	Television film
2008, 2009	Degrassi: The Next Generation	Vickie	2 episodes
2010	The Devil's Teardrop	Receptionist	Television film
2012	I, Martin Short, Goes Home	Kim Chee	Television film
2012, 2016	Air Crash Investigation	Flight Attendant	2 episodes
2013	The Listener	Victoria Chan	Episode: "Early Checkout"
2014	Hemlock Grove	Nadine	2 episodes
2015–2021	Blood and Water	Teresa Fai	29 episodes
2016	Between	Daisy	2 episodes
2017	Save Me	Rookie	3 episodes
2017–2020	Dino Dana	Cai	5 episodes
2019–2022	Diggstown	Carol Chan	4 episodes
2021	Cam Boy	Amber	Episode: "4.5 Out of 5"
2021	Blood and Water: Fire and Ice	Teresa	8 episodes
2021	In the Dark	Susannah Jenkins	3 episodes
2021	Moonshine	Moira Lancaster	8 episodes
