= Sebastian (2017 film) =

- Directed by: James Fanizza
- Written by: James Fanizza
- Produced by: James Fanizza; Brendan Whelton
- Starring: James Fanizza; Guifré Bantjes-Rafols; Alex House; Brian McCook
- Cinematography: Kalen Artinian
- Release date: May 2017 (Inside Out)
- Running time: 80 minutes
- Country: Canada
- Language: English

Sebastian is a Canadian romantic drama film, which premiered at the Inside Out Film and Video Festival in May 2017. The feature directorial debut of James Fanizza, the film is an expansion of the 2014 short film of the same name, which was written by Fanizza but directed by Ricky Bryant.

== Plot ==
The film centres on Alex (Fanizza), a man in Toronto whose unfulfilling relationship with his boyfriend Nelson (Guifré Bantjes-Rafols) is complicated when he meets and falls for Sebastian (Alex House), Nelson's visiting cousin from Argentina. The film's cast also includes Brian McCook, better known as drag entertainer Katya Zamolodchikova, as Xenia.

== Cast ==
- Alex House as Sebastion
- James Fanizza as Alex
- Guifre Bantjes-Rafols as Nelson
- Brian McCook as Xenia

== Critical response ==
Writing for Toronto Film Scene magazine, William Brownridge described the film as a relatively typical and predictable romantic drama, but praised the film for depicting well-rounded gay characters: "you may know where Sebastian is headed, but that doesn’t take away from the touching journey to get you there."
