= We Were Children =

- Directed by: Tim Wolochatiuk
- Written by: Jason Sherman
- Produced by: Kyle Irving; David Christensen
- Cinematography: Jeremy Benning; Kim Bell
- Edited by: John Whitcher
- Music by: Shawn Pierce
- Production companies: Eagle Vision; eOne Television; National Film Board of Canada
- Release dates: October 2, 2012 (Vancouver International Film Festival); March 18, 2017 (streaming)
- Running time: 82 m 50 s
- Country: Canada
- Language: English

We Were Children is a 2012 Canadian documentary film about the experiences of First Nations children in the Canadian Indian residential school system. Directed by Tim Wolochatiuk and written by Jason Sherman, the film recounts the experiences of two residential school survivors: Lyna Hart, who attended the Guy Hill Residential School in Manitoba, and Glen Anaquod, who attended the Lebret Indian Residential School in Saskatchewan. We Were Children presents their experiences through a combination of personal interviews and dramatic recreations.

Hart considered her involvement in We Were Children a vital step in her healing process, marking the first time she had fully shared her experiences. Anaquod died on May 31, 2011, before the film's completion; his family was given a private screening. Hart died on January 3, 2015.

== Production ==
Eagle Vision's executive producer Lisa Meeches—whose parents and older siblings were sent to residential schools, and who spent over 7 years travelling across Canada to collect residential school survivors' stories for the Government of Canada—has stated that the idea for the film originated from a discussion she had had at the Banff World Media Festival. It was Meeches who approached director Tim Wolochatiuk with the project.

The film was shot in Manitoba, namely in Winnipeg, St-Pierre-Jolys, and at the former Portage residential school (now the Rufus Prince building) in Portage la Prairie. It was produced by Kyle Irving for Eagle Vision, Loren Mawhinney for eOne Television, and produced and executive produced by David Christensen for the National Film Board of Canada.

CBC Manitoba reporter Sheila North Wilson assisted the production by translating material in the script from English to Cree.

== Cast ==
The film's cast includes both acting performances and interviewees, as We Were Children combines interviews of its two subjects with dramatic recreations of their experiences. Among the cast were:

- Lyna Hart — self
  - Alicia Hamelin — Lyna, 4 years old
  - Jade Hamelin — Lyna, 10 years old
  - Jennie Morin — Lyna, 18 yrs old
- Glen Anaquod — self
  - René Batson — Glen, 6–7 years old
  - Brun Montour (as Bruin Montour) — Glen, 12 yrs old (as Bruin Montour)
  - Justin Ducharme — Glen, 18 years old
  - Justin Courchene — Glen, Adult
- Darcy Fehr — Glen's Teacher Priest
- Darren Felbel — Priest, Saskatchewan
- Rebecca Gibson — Sister Mary
- Lois Brothers — Glen's Teacher
- Fawnda Neckoway - Lyna's Mother
- Glenn Cochrane — Lyna's Grandfather
- Kayla Contois-Moar — Virginia

== Release ==
We Were Children premiered on 2 October 2012 at the Vancouver International Film Festival, followed by a screening at the imagineNATIVE Film + Media Arts Festival in Toronto on October 18. It was broadcast on the Aboriginal Peoples Television Network in March 2013, followed by a DVD release from the National Film Board of Canada on 12 April 2013.

== See also ==
- Sleeping Children Awake, a 1992 documentary about residential schools
- Where the Spirit Lives, a 1989 drama about residential schools
- Our Spirits Don't Speak English, a 2008 documentary film about Native American boarding schools in the United States
