= Foundation for Equal Families =

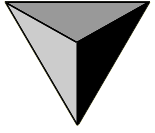
- Formation: 1994
- Headquarters: Toronto, Ontario

The Foundation for Equal Families is a Canadian gay and lesbian rights group founded in 1994 following the failure of Bill 167 in the Legislative Assembly of Ontario. The group's mandate is "Dedicated to achieving recognition and equality for same sex relationships and associated family rights through education and legal action". Meeting this mandate was accomplished by intervening in various precedent-setting legal cases, through representation at various pride parades and most notably in suing the Canadian federal government over failure to amend 58 pieces of federal legislation that were charter-infringing due to the definition of spouse.

== Creation ==
The Foundation is made up of community activists and lawyers.

On May 17, 1994, the Ontario Attorney General introduced the bill to provide same-sex couples with rights and obligations equal to opposite-sex common law couples. The legislation would have amended the definition of "spouse" in 79 provincial statutes. The Bill was defeated by a vote of 68 to 59 on second reading on June 9, 1994.

== Intervener ==
On multiple occasions, the Foundation sought and was granted intervener status in various court cases. An intervener is a party that has an interest in the case, but is not either the appellant or respondent.

M. v. H.

- A lesbian couple had been in a long-term relationship. When the relationship ended, one of the women, M, made a claim for support from her former partner under the Ontario Family Law Act. The definition of spouse in the Act that applied to support orders did not include same-sex couples. M brought a Charter challenge to this definition. She won at the lower court level and the appeals level; the provincial government appealed each time, rather than the respondent H. In reaction to the success of the case at the Supreme Court of Canada, the Ontario government introduced and passed an Act, Bill 5, Amendments Because of the Supreme Court of Canada Decision in M. v. H. Act, 1999.

M. v. H. - Court of Appeal for Ontario
M. v. H. - Court of Appeal for Ontario - motion requesting intervener status
M. v. H. - Supreme Court of Canada

Vriend

- Delwyn Vriend was fired from his job at a church run college because he was gay. When he sought to bring a human rights complaint against his former employer, he was told that he could not do so because the Individual Rights Protection Act of Alberta did not protect people from discrimination on the basis of sexual orientation. Vriend and three lesbian and gay groups then brought a Charter challenge. They claimed that the government and Legislature of Alberta were discriminating by their refusal to add protection on the basis of sexual orientation to Alberta's human rights act despite repeated calls to do so. The Supreme Court of Canada unanimously held that the Alberta Individual Rights Protection Act treated lesbians and gay men in a discriminatory fashion and denied them equal protection and equal benefit of the law. This discrimination could not be reasonable justified in a free and democratic society.

Vriend v. Alberta - Supreme Court of Canada

Rosenberg

- Two women, Nancy Rosenberg and Margaret Evans, had both received the employee benefits offered by the Canadian Union of Public Employees (CUPE) for their lesbian partners. When CUPE was unable to register its plan to include same-sex survivor benefits, the two women challenged the Income Tax Act's definition of "spouse". They said that they were being discriminated against under s. 15(1) of the Charter of Rights & Freedoms, which guarantees that every individual has the right to equal benefit of the law without discrimination. The Ontario Court of Appeal, in a unanimous decision, overturned the lower court's decision and found that the restrictive definition of "spouse" in the Income Tax Act violated the Charter. The Court determined that the appropriate remedy was the immediate reading in of same-sex partners into the definition of "spouse" as it relates to private pension plans. The federal government decided not to appeal this decision. This case led to amendments to the Income Tax Act recognising same-sex common-law spouses.

Rosenberg v. Canada (Human Rights Commission) - Court of Appeal for Ontario

Chamberlain

- Summary to come

Chamberlain v. Surrey School District No. 36 - Supreme Court of Canada (as a party of Families in Partnership)

Jane Doe & Doe

- Summary to come

Jane Doe v. Canada (Attorney General) - Superior Court of Justice
Jane Doe v. Canada (Attorney General) - Court of Appeal for Ontario
Doe v. Canada (Attorney General) - Superior Court of Justice

Same-Sex Marriage reference

- Summary to come

Reference re Same-Sex Marriage - Supreme Court of Canada

== Parliamentary appearances ==
Representatives of the Foundation have made appearances in front of several Canadian parliamentary standing committees.

- Michelle Douglas and Susan Ursel discuss the support of Bill C-23, the Modernization of Benefits and Obligations Act at the Standing Committee on Justice and Human Rights - March 15, 2000
- Michelle Douglas and David Corbett discuss the Foundations support of civil marriage at the Standing Committee on Justice and Human Rights - February 11, 2003

== Education ==
The education portion of the mandate was achieved through participation in various cities pride events, including Toronto, London, Windsor and Ottawa. Various legal "fact sheets" were drawn up providing summaries of various legal decisions that affect the LGBT community.

Also, information sessions were held discussing the impact of various legislative changes, "[i]n fact, just last week the foundation sponsored a seminar on the new Income Tax Act provisions that affect same-sex couples"

== Omnibus lawsuit ==
After a lack of legislative change to the multitude of federal legislation in relation to recognition of same-sex common-law spouses, the Foundation served an omnibus legal challenge to 58 federal Acts. The lawsuit, Foundation for Equal Families v. Canada (Attorney General) (1999), 36 C.P.C. (4th) 201 (S.C.J.), was served on the Federal Government on January 7, 1999. Extensive news coverage appeared both nationally and internationally; a BBC news article.

The case was ultimately settled once the government introduced and passed the Modernization of Benefits and Obligations Act.

Neither the omnibus lawsuit nor the Modernization of Benefits and Obligations Act addressed or made mention of providing access to marriage.

== Directors ==
There were several directors of the Foundation including:

- Michelle Douglas - "I've been an advocate for the equal treatment of gays and lesbians for more than ten years. I never imagined this role for myself, but when I was fired by the Canadian Armed Forces for being a lesbian, it had a profound effect on me. I fought my dismissal from the military in court, and it was my case that overturned the discriminatory ban against gays and lesbians in the military in October 1992"
- Susan Ursel
- Bob Gallagher
- David Corbett
- Marcie N. Wexler
- Kerry Tromanhauser
- Valerie Dugale

== See also ==
- LGBT rights in Canada
- List of LGBT rights organisations
- Egale Canada
