= Shattered City: The Halifax Explosion =

- Written by: Keith Ross Leckie
- Directed by: Bruce Pittman
- Starring: Vincent Walsh; Shauna MacDonald
- Music by: Christopher Dedrick
- Country of origin: Canada
- Original language: English

Production
- Producers: Heather Haldane; Jenipher Ritchie
- Cinematography: Rene Ohashi
- Editors: Ralph Brunjes; Stewart Dowds
- Running time: 240 min (including commercials)
- Production companies: Canadian Broadcasting Corporation (CBC); Tapestry Pictures

Original release
- Network: CBC Television
- Release: 26 October 2003 – 2003

Shattered City: The Halifax Explosion is a two-part miniseries produced in 2003 by CBC Television. It presents a fictionalized version of the Halifax Explosion, a 1917 catastrophe that destroyed much of the Canadian city of Halifax. It was directed by Bruce Pittman and written by Keith Ross Leckie. The Film Stars Vincent Walsh, Tamara Hope, Clare Stone, Zachary Bennett, Shauna MacDonald and Ted Dykstra.

== Creation ==
The series was expensive by Canadian television standards with a budget of $10.4 million. It was heavily promoted by the CBC and paired with a number of non-fiction documentaries. The broadcast drew a sizable Canadian audience of 1.5 million viewers. It drew some praise for the adept use of special effects to show the destruction of the explosion. However the miniseries was poorly received critically. One critic at the Globe and Mail described it as "execrably written and acted" while another strained to find positive elements, "At times, there is a plodding workmanlike quality to Shattered City." The miniseries won some technical awards at the Canadian television Gemini Awards in 2004 (photography, special effects, costume and sound) but was passed over for any direction or writing awards and won only a single supporting acting award for Ted Dykstra.

== Concerns ==
Serious concerns were raised over the depiction of history in the miniseries. Descendants of explosion victims and professional historians objected to the historical distortions and numerous liberties with historical truth. Significant deviations include:

- The addition of a major subplot featuring German spies in Halifax (the Germans conducted espionage in North America but few major acts of sabotage such as the Black Tom explosion and none in Halifax during the war).
- The movie does not show the tsunami which followed directly after the explosion, although it is briefly mentioned.
- A conspiracy that frees the captain of SS Mont-Blanc and the naval commander Frederick Wyatt leaving Mont-Blanc's pilot, Francis Mackey, as the fall guy for the explosion. In fact, Wyatt was the only person sent to trial for the explosion and was subsequently acquitted by a jury of Halifax citizens.
- Commander Wyatt is depicted as a British officer (he was Canadian) and is shown pushing for relaxed regulation of ammunition handling (he actually argued for stricter regulation) and refusing to approach the burning Mont-Blanc (he was in fact boarding a harbour tug to direct firefighting when the explosion occurred). Similarly, captain Le Medec is depicted as a coward who was first to abandon his ship when in fact he was the last to leave it.
- In the aftermath of the explosion, which was very historically inaccurate, the film depicts only minimal emergency relief capability until American assistance arrives by train, when in fact there were ample Canadian resources available, and the first American aid did not arrive until two days afterward.
- One of the police officers asks Captain Le Medec who won the hockey game last night, "Montreal or Toronto" to which Le Medec replies "Montréal, of course" then the officer responds that it was Detroit. The Detroit Red Wings entered the NHL in 1926 as the Detroit Cougars. NHL teams for the inaugural 1917–18 season were the Montreal Canadiens, Montreal Wanderers, Ottawa Senators (original) and the Toronto Arenas which became the Maple Leafs a few years later.

== Cast ==
- Vincent Walsh – Capt. Charlie Collins
- Shauna MacDonald – Dr. Barbara Paxton
- Ted Dykstra – Francis Mackey
- Tamara Hope – Beatrix Collins
- Zachary Bennett – Ernest Masterson
- Clare Stone – Constance Collins
- Max Morrow – Courtney Collins
- Paul Doucet – Capt. Le Medec
- Lynne Griffin – Millicent Collins
- Richard Donat – Patrick Collins
- Gordon Michael Woolvett – Sgt. Sam Barlow
- Brian Downey – Capt. Horatio Brannen
- John Dunsworth – Naval Officer McNabb
- Leon Pownall – Cmdr. Frederick Wyatt
- Kendra and Kira Ridgley – Ashpan Annie
- Graham Greene – Elijah Cobb
