= Screen Door =

Canadian film and tv production company

- Industry: Film; Media
- Founded: founded in 1999
- Headquarters: Toronto, Ontario, Canada
- Products: Specialty Channels, Movie Distribution; Motion pictures
- Website: http://www.screendoor.org

Screen Door (formerly Tapestry Pictures Inc.) is a Canadian independent production company founded in 1999 by Mary Young Leckie and Heather Haldane. The company produces film and television.

Screen Door is a Toronto-based independent production company specializing in dramatic films and mini-series.

Formed in 1999 by producers Heather Haldane and Mary Young Leckie, the company is the outcome of a long-standing professional relationship that began with their producing the feature film, WHERE THE SPIRIT LIVES.

The company's films have been shown worldwide by CBC Television, CTV, The Movie Network, Showcase, Hallmark, PBS, Canal+ and the BBC. Distributors for Screen Door's films have included Alliance Atlantis, Seville, Power, Marvista, and Oasis.

== Productions ==
- MVP (TV series) (2008)
- Everest (2007)
- The Climb (2006)
- Shades of Black: The Conrad Black Story
- Spirit Bear: The Simon Jackson Story
- Prom Queen: The Marc Hall Story (2002)
- Burn: The Robert Wraight Story (2003)
- Shattered City: The Halifax Explosion (2003)
- Tagged: The Jonathan Wamback Story (2001)
- Children of My Heart (2000)
- The Arrow (1997)
- Gzowski in Conversation
- Where the Spirit Lives (1989)
