= Out of Order (miniseries) =

- Genre: Comedy drama
- Created by: Donna Powers; Wayne Powers
- Written by: Donna Powers; Wayne Powers
- Starring: Eric Stoltz; Felicity Huffman; Kim Dickens; Dyllan Christopher; Justine Bateman; William H. Macy; Peter Bogdanovich; Lane Smith; Celia Weston; Adam Harrington
- Country of origin: United States
- Original language: English
- No. of episodes: 6

Original release
- Network: Showtime
- Release: June 1 – June 30, 2003

Out of Order is an American dramedy television miniseries created and written by Donna Powers and Wayne Powers (Deep Blue Sea, The Italian Job), who also directed the first and final episodes. The show lasted six episodes, which aired on Showtime from June 1, 2003, to June 30, 2003.

== Premise ==
An unsatisfying marriage leads a man to consider a relationship with someone else.

== Cast ==
- Eric Stoltz as Mark Colm
- Felicity Huffman as Lorna Colm
- Kim Dickens as Danni
- Dyllan Christopher as Walter
- Justine Bateman as Annie
- William H. Macy as Steven
- Peter Bogdanovich as Zach
- Lane Smith as Frank
- Celia Weston as Carrie
- Adam Harrington as Brock

== Episodes ==
1. "Pilot (Part One)"
2. "Pilot (Part Two)"
3. "The Art of Loss"
4. "Losing My Religion"
5. "Follow the Rat"
6. "Put Me In Order"

== Production ==
Asked about the X-rated underwater sequence with Eric Stoltz, Kim Dickens said, "The irony is that once Eric and I were down there without masks on, looking at each other underwater, we can't really see much. We just took the leap of faith, and we did it, and we felt good about it because it felt kind of real."

== Reception ==
The New York Times called it one of the "Ten Best Shows on Television" in 2003. The Associated Press said, "It warrants comparison with the best of television, HBO's Six Feet Under and The Sopranos."

== Awards and nominations ==
The series was nominated for a Golden Satellite Award for Best Miniseries and also nominated for an Artios, Best Casting for TV Miniseries. Justine Bateman won a Golden Satellite Award for Best Performance by an Actress in a Supporting Role in a Miniseries or a Motion Picture Made for Television. Felicity Huffman was nominated for Best Performance by an Actress in a Miniseries, or a Motion Picture Made for Television.

== Home media ==
The pilot episode is available on DVD. The series was also edited together and released on DVD as a standalone feature film by Showtime Entertainment.
