= Hall v Durham Catholic School Board =

Canadian legal case

Hall v Durham Catholic School Board was a 2002 court case in which Marc Hall, a Canadian teenager, fought a successful legal battle against the Durham Catholic District School Board to bring a same-sex date to his high school prom. The case made Canadian and international headlines.

== Legal case ==
Hall v Durham Catholic School Board began when Oshawa, Ontario's Monsignor John Pereyma Catholic Secondary School asked students attending the prom to submit the names of the guests they intended to bring. Hall, who is gay, submitted the name of his 21-year-old boyfriend, Jean-Paul Dumond, and was denied on the grounds that homosexuality is incompatible with Roman Catholic teaching.

Supported by his family and a wide variety of community organizations, Hall thus took the school board to court in a two-day hearing that began on May 6, 2002. Hall's lawyer, David Corbett, argued that the denial of his request violated the Ontario Education Act, which requires school boards in the province not to discriminate. The school board, on the other hand, argued that court interference in its decision would amount to denying its religious freedom.

Corbett argued that an organization that accepts public funding (Catholic school boards in Ontario are fully funded in the same manner as public schools) has to be accountable to the same laws (including anti-discrimination laws) as other public institutions. The school board's lawyer countered that Section 93 of the Canadian constitution protects the Catholic board's rights to conduct its affairs in accordance with Catholic teaching.

In addition, Corbett noted that while extramarital sex is also contrary to Catholic teaching, the school board had previously allowed pregnant, unmarried students to attend the prom.

On May 10, Justice Robert McKinnon granted an interlocutory injunction ordering that Hall be allowed to attend the prom with Dumond and also that the school does not cancel the prom. He did not decide on the larger issues raised by the case, leaving those to be heard at a later trial. Hall attended the prom with Dumond that evening.

The case was set for trial in October 2005. In June 2005, Hall applied to discontinue the action and not proceed to trial; this was opposed by the school board, which desired a final judgement on the case. Hall's application was granted by Justice Bryan Shaughnessy on June 28, 2005, thereby ending the case.

== In popular culture ==
=== Television ===
Director Larry Peloso created a one-hour documentary on the case entitled Prom Fight: The Marc Hall Story. An unrelated television movie, Prom Queen: The Marc Hall Story, aired on CTV in 2004 with Aaron Ashmore starring as Hall.

Hall also appeared in the Queer as Folk season 2 finale as a party guest during the Rage party at Babylon.

Hall later recounted a story from the prom in the 2019 documentary film Take Me to Prom.

=== Stage ===
The case was adapted into a theatrical musical entitled Prom Queen, with songs by Colleen Dauncey and Akiva Romer-Segal.

The Louder We Get, originally produced as Prom Queen, debuted in Calgary, January 28-February 22, 2020 as part of the 2019-20 Theatre Calgary season.

=== Literature ===
Author Robert Joseph Greene referenced the court case in his book This High School Has Closets, where Marc Hall is seen as a hero to the main character.

== See also ==
- 2010 Itawamba County School District prom controversy
- Fricke v. Lynch: a similar case in the United States
- Gay rights in Canada
- Timeline of LGBT history in Canada
