= Sleeping Children Awake =

- Directed by: Rhonda Kara Hanah
- Based on: Residential School System
- Produced by: Rhonda Kara Hanah
- Release date: 1992
- Running time: 51 minutes
- Country: Canada
- Language: English

Sleeping Children Awake is a Canadian feature-length, documentary video outlining the history of the residential school system and its effect on generations of First Nations’ people. The video was first released in 1992, to a premiere theatrical screening and broadcast on Thunder Bay Television. The documentary has a running time of 50 minutes and 50 seconds. It was produced and directed by the independent filmmaker Rhonda Kara Hanah.

Lakehead University and Thunder Bay Television funded the documentary. Hanah used her own resources to begin work on the production, until the financing from Lakehead and Thunder Bay Television was established.

After its release, the video won a number of awards for its portrayal of the residential school system. The documentary was recognized for its role in combatting racism and religious intolerance.

== Background ==
Residential Schools operated in Canada from the 1800s until 1996. These schools were said to be a primary weapon of the government and the missionaries in their attempt to systematically destroy Native culture. Generations of First Nations people were scarred from the effects of their policies.

While day schools for First Nations, Metis and Inuit children always far outnumbered residential schools, a new consensus emerged in the early twenty-first century that the latter schools did significant harm to Aboriginal children who attended them by removing them from their families and depriving them of their ancestral languages and cultural practises. Many of the students suffered physical and sexual abuse at the hands of staff and other students.

When the video was made, there was very little discussion about the crucial subject of residential schools either in the education system, or in the mass media. This controversial subject did not seem to be part of the collective consciousness at that time. Hanah was quoted saying that she had no awareness of any books or films on the subject when she made the documentary. Prior to recording the video, Hanah had heard Shirley Cheechoo read a poem she had written about her experiences in the residential schools. The poem moved Hanah to promise Cheechoo that in an effort to create greater awareness of the residential schools legacy, she would do anything in her power to help Cheechoo get her story out.

As such, her intention was to further the subject into general awareness and in the public forum to begin further examination and exposure. Also in following the acts of Cheechoo’s 1991 autobiographical play, Path with No Moccasins, Hanah hoped to reinforce the healing that comes from exposing these stories.

Sleeping Children Awake was one of the earliest independent feature documentaries to be broadcast about the history of the residential school system. The subject had received little coverage up to this point, and the experiences of the people who attended the schools had rarely been documented.

== Production and summary ==
Sleeping Children Awake is both a personal record of Canada’s history and a tribute to the enduring strength of Native cultures. Phil Fontaine, then Grand Chief of the Assembly of First Nations and a residential school survivor, was quoted at the opening of the video stating that "first step in healing is disclosure." This opening quote was intended to establish the theme and purpose of the documentary.

The video features a number of First Nations leaders, including Art Solomon and Elijah Harper. Solomon shares stories that he heard during his many years working intimately with aboriginal people. These stories are used throughout the video, along with many other personal memories of residential school survivors. These recollections are set alongside dramatic excerpts from Shirley Cheechoo’s 1991 autobiographical play, Path with No Moccasins. The play demonstrates Cheechoo's experiences within the schools, the subsequent destructive lifestyle that resulted, and her path to healing.

The documentary features the music of R. Carlos Nakai, sacred songs from Maria Linklater, and the artwork of various accomplished artists.

== Reception ==
The documentary video received a number of awards and positive reviews. There have been two public screenings, the first premiere in 1992 and a second in November 2008. It was also screened at the first of national event of the Truth and Reconciliation Commission of Canada (TRCC) held in Manitoba in 2010 and again at their event in Saskatchewan in 2012.

Sleeping Children Awake has been broadcast on CTV, CBC and TV Ontario, and has been used within schools, hospitals, and universities. It has long been in use in private social work/ therapy with residential school survivors. In this capacity it is used to initiate the difficult subject and ease the audience into feeling more comfortable sharing their own experiences.

The film examines first and foremost the personal experience of First Nations students in residential schools, and that of the families and communities from which they were torn. It also touches on the intergenerational affects resulting from this policy. The wider conclusions to be drawn from such experiences are left largely to the audience. Conversely, this treatment illuminates all the more starkly the political and social implications of residential schools.

=== Awards ===
- Dreamspeakers International Film Festival: An International Aboriginal Culture, Arts and Film Festival Award of Recognition, Edmonton, Alberta 1994
- American Indian Film Festival: Selected for Screening San Francisco, California 1993
- Can Pro Award: Best Canadian Documentary 1993
- Canadian Association of Broadcasting: Gold Ribbon Award Finalist in Public Affairs 1993
- Iris Awards: Finalist - Combating Racism / Religious Intolerance 1993
- Truth and Reconciliation Commission of Canada: Certificate of Acknowledgement & Selected for Screening at National Events, Manitoba 2010 & Saskatchewan 2012

== See also ==
- Where the Spirit Lives, a 1989 dramatic film about the Canadian residential school system
- We Were Children, a 2012 documentary about residential schools
