= Tammy's Always Dying =

2019 film directed by Amy Jo Johnson

- Film poster
- Directed by: Amy Jo Johnson
- Written by: Joanne Sarazen
- Produced by: Jessica Adams; Harry Cherniak
- Starring: Felicity Huffman; Anastasia Phillips
- Cinematography: Daniel Grant
- Edited by: Bryan Atkinson
- Production companies: JA Productions; Plainspeak Pictures; Prospero Pictures
- Distributed by: Quiver Distribution
- Release dates: September 5, 2019 (TIFF); May 1, 2020 (Canada)
- Country: Canada
- Language: English

Tammy's Always Dying is a 2019 Canadian black comedy film directed by Amy Jo Johnson and written by Joanne Sarazen. It stars Felicity Huffman, Anastasia Phillips, Jessica Greco, Clark Johnson, Lauren Holly, Aaron Ashmore and Kristian Bruun.

It had its world premiere at the 2019 Toronto International Film Festival on September 5, 2019. It received generally positive reviews from critics, particularly for Huffman's and Phillips' performances. It was released through video on demand on May 1, 2020, by Quiver Distribution.

== Plot ==
When Tammy, a self-destructive woman who has a dysfunctional relationship with her daughter Catherine, is diagnosed with terminal cancer, Catherine invites a television producer to document her process of caring for her mother in an attempt to profit from their misfortune. However, she finds her plans complicated by Tammy's persistent refusal to actually die.

== Cast ==
- Felicity Huffman as Tammy MacDonald
- Anastasia Phillips as Catherine MacDonald
- Clark Johnson as Doug
- Lauren Holly as Ilana Wiseman
- Aaron Ashmore as Reggie Seamus
- Kristian Bruun as Jamie
- Jessica Greco as Kelly Seamus
- Oluniké Adeliyi as Pascal
- Ali Hassan as Gordon Baker

== Production ==
In December 2018, it was announced Felicity Huffman, Anastasia Phillips, Clark Johnson, Lauren Holly and Aaron Ashmore had joined the cast of the film, with Amy Jo Johnson directing from a screenplay by Joanne Sarazen. Principal photography concluded in December 2018 in Hamilton, Ontario.

== Release ==
The film had its world premiere at the Toronto International Film Festival on September 5, 2019. In March 2020, Quiver Distribution acquired U.S. distribution rights to the film. It was released through video on demand on May 1, 2020.

== Reception ==
On the review aggregator website Rotten Tomatoes, the film holds an approval rating of 75% based on 32 reviews. The website's consensus reads, "It occasionally struggles to deal effectively with its weighty themes, but Tammy's Always Dying is always anchored by Felicity Huffman's finely tuned performance."

The film received two Canadian Screen Award nominations at the 9th Canadian Screen Awards in 2021, for Best Supporting Actress (Huffman) and Best Hair (Renée Chan).
