= The Cryptogram =

Play by David Mamet

The Cryptogram is a play by American playwright David Mamet. The play concerns the moment when childhood is lost. The story is set in 1959 on the night before a young boy is to go on a camping trip with his father. The play premiered in 1994 in London, and has since been produced Off-Broadway in 1995 and again in London in 2006.

== Productions ==
The Cryptogram was originally produced in July 1994 at the Ambassadors Theatre in London, starring Eddie Izzard and Lindsay Duncan and directed by Gregory Mosher.

The Cryptogram opened at the American Repertory Theater, Boston in February 1995.

It opened Off-Broadway at the Westside Theater Upstairs on April 13, 1995. The production was directed by David Mamet with a cast that featured Shelton Dane (John), Ed Begley, Jr. (Del) and Felicity Huffman (Donny). The play won the Obie Award, Best Play and Performance, Huffman for 1995.

It was produced at the Donmar Warehouse (London) in October 2006 through November 2006 with Kim Cattrall as Donny, Douglas Henshall as Del and Oliver Coopersmith as John with direction by Josie Rourke.

The play was a finalist for the 1995 Pulitzer Prize for Drama.

== Critical reception ==
The CurtainUp reviewer wrote of the 2006 Donmar production: "David Mamet’s play 'The Cryptogram', about the breakup of a marriage from a child’s point of view, has a lasting impact beyond its slight sixty five minutes in the theatre.... The dialogue brims with that distinctive Mamet style of unfinished sentences and jabbing, intercepting, interrupted conversation..... The adults are very repetitive as is the boy when his stream of questions is not answered.... It seems that what we are watching is the child’s memory of the events of that night and the day, weeks later, when he has to move out of his home. There are too many gaps that seem improbable from an adult’s point of view, like Donny’s reaction to the note from her husband leaving her. No asking, Why? No talk about a meeting with her husband..... It is very difficult for English actors to play Mamet well, to get the timing perfect but under Josie Rourke’s direction this cast pulls it off."
