= Felicity Huffman =

American actress (born 1962)

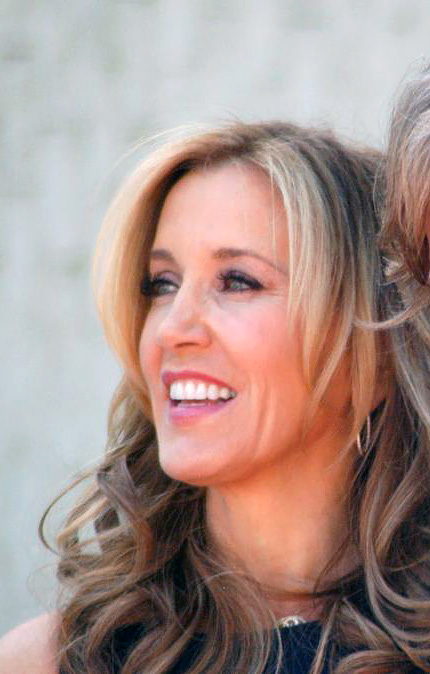
- Huffman in 2012
- Born: Felicity Kendall Huffman; December 9, 1962 (age 63); Bedford, New York, U.S.
- Education: The Putney School; Interlochen Arts Academy; New York University; Circle in the Square Theatre School; Royal Academy of Dramatic Art
- Occupation: Actress
- Years active: 1978–present
- Spouse: William H. Macy (m. 1997)
- Children: 2
- Awards: Full list

Felicity Kendall Huffman (born December 9, 1962) is an American actress. She is known for her role as Lynette Scavo in the ABC comedy-drama Desperate Housewives and her role as Sabrina "Bree" Osbourne, a transgender woman, in the film Transamerica (2005). She has received numerous accolades including a Primetime Emmy Award and a Golden Globe Award as well as a nomination for an Academy Award.

Huffman began her career in theatre, and in the 1990s also had many supporting roles in film and television. She starred as Dana Whitaker in the ABC comedy-drama Sports Night from 1998 to 2000, which earned her a Golden Globe Award nomination. Her role as Lynette Scavo in the ABC comedy-drama Desperate Housewives (2004–2012) earned her a Primetime Emmy Award for Outstanding Lead Actress in a Comedy Series, three Screen Actors Guild Awards, and nominations for three Golden Globe Awards.

Huffman drew critical praise for her performance in Transamerica, which earned her a Golden Globe Award, Independent Spirit Award, National Board of Review, Satellite Award, and an Academy Award nomination for Best Actress. Huffman has starred in films including Reversal of Fortune (1990), The Spanish Prisoner (1997), Magnolia (1999), Path to War (2002), Georgia Rule (2007), Phoebe in Wonderland (2008), Rudderless (2014), and Cake (2014). From 2015 to 2017, she starred in a third ABC series, the anthology crime drama American Crime, for which she received nominations for three Primetime Emmy Awards for Outstanding Lead Actress in a Limited Series or Movie.

Huffman was arrested for her involvement with a 2019 nationwide college entrance exam cheating scandal. Convicted of conspiracy to commit mail fraud and honest services mail fraud, she was sentenced to 14 days in prison, a $30,000 fine, and 250 hours of community service.

== Early life and education ==
Huffman was born in Bedford, New York, into a wealthy family, the daughter of Grace Valle (née Ewing) and Moore Peters Huffman, a banker and partner at Morgan Stanley. Her parents divorced a year after her birth, and she was raised by both of them. When Huffman was a young teenager, she discovered that her biological father was Roger Tallman Maher, who was a family friend. She has six half-sisters and a half-brother. In the 1970s, Huffman's mother left New York and bought property in Snowmass, Colorado, where Felicity and her siblings spent their youth. Her great-grandfather was Gershom Moore Peters, founder of the Peters Cartridge Company and Baptist minister, author of The Master. Another great-grandfather, Frederick Berthold Ewing, graduated from Yale University and became a St. Louis businessman. Huffman's great-great-grandfather was Joseph Warren King, founder of the King Mills Powder Company. She has German, English, Scots-Irish, Scottish, French-Canadian, and Irish ancestry.

Huffman attended The Putney School, a private boarding high school in Putney, Vermont, and graduated from Interlochen Arts Academy in Michigan in 1981. She attended New York University, Circle in the Square Theatre School and the Royal Academy of Dramatic Art in London, England.

== Career ==
=== Early career ===
Huffman made her debut on stage in 1982 and in the 1980s and 1990s worked as a rule on stage productions. In 1988, she debuted on Broadway in the role as Karen in David Mamet's play Speed the Plow. In 1995, Huffman won Obie Award for her performance in the play The Cryptogram by David Mamet. In 1999 she starred in the premiere of David Mamet's play Boston Marriage, about the daringly intimate relationship between two turn-of-the-century women, as well as in several other major theatrical productions.

=== 1991–2003: Earliest television and film roles ===
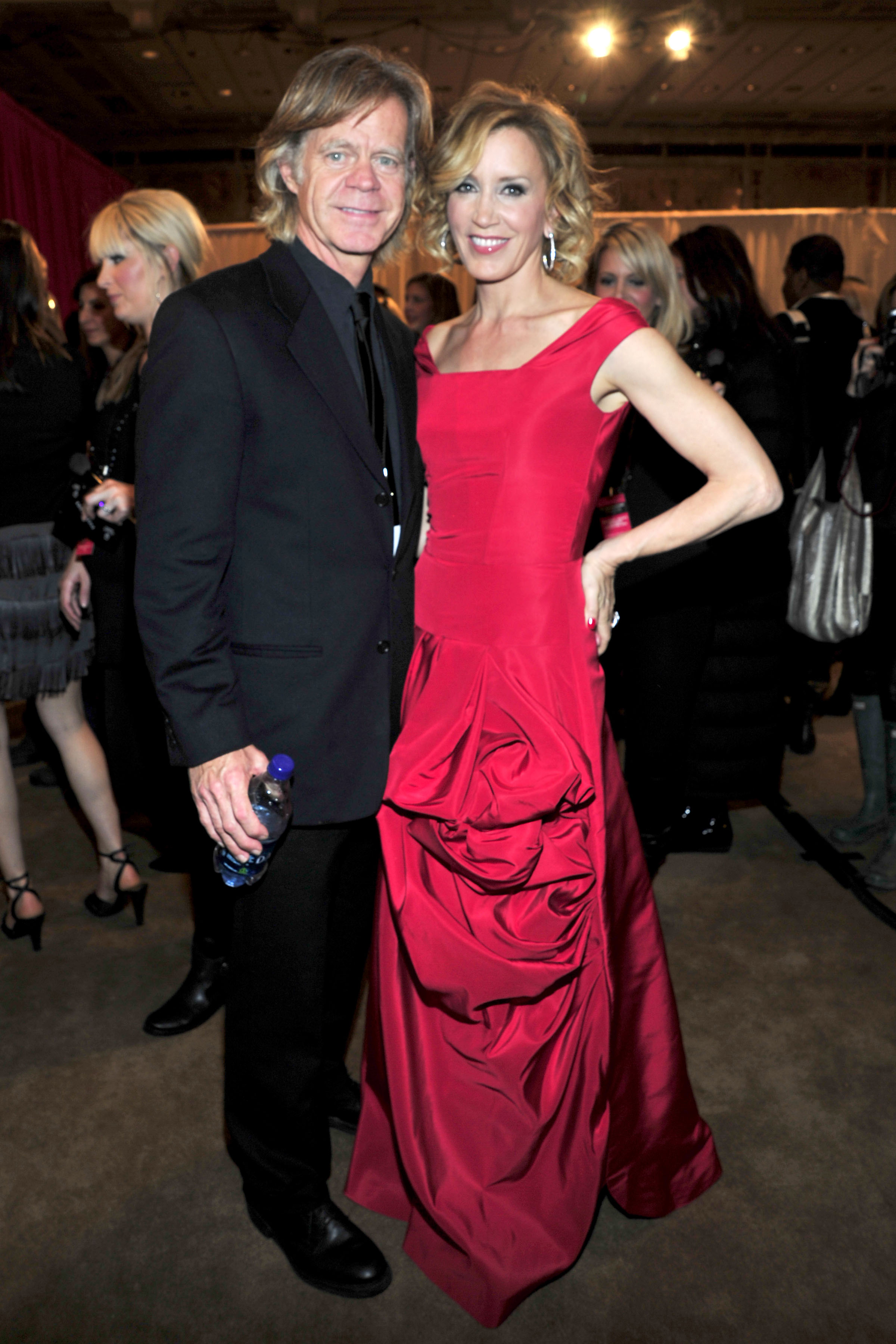
Huffman and Macy at The Heart Truth in February 2010

Huffman debuted on the big screen in 1988 with a small role in Mamet's film Things Change. Two years later, she appeared as Minnie, a Harvard law school student in the courtroom drama Reversal of Fortune. Her other credits include 1992 thriller Quicksand: No Escape with Donald Sutherland and Tim Matheson, The Water Engine opposite William H. Macy, and supporting roles on The Heart of Justice (1992), Hackers (1995), Harrison: Cry of the City (1996) and The Underworld (1997).

Huffman starred on the television mini-series Golden Years, based on the novel by Stephen King in 1991. In 1994, she starred in the ABC pilot Thunder Alley as Ed Asner's daughter, but was replaced in subsequent episodes by Diane Venora when the series began. During the 1990s, she appeared mostly in guest roles on such shows as The X-Files, Early Edition, Chicago Hope and Law & Order. In 1997, she starred in Mamet's film The Spanish Prisoner.

From 1998 to 2000, she portrayed Dana Whitaker in the series Sports Night, for which she received several awards and nominations, including a Golden Globe Award for Best Actress – Television Series Musical or Comedy. After the completion of Sports Night, she gave birth to her first child and soon returned to work. In 2001, she starred on the not picked up CBS pilot Heart Department In 2003, she starred in Showtime's miniseries Out of Order.

In 1999, she appeared in Paul Thomas Anderson's ensemble drama Magnolia and television adaptation of 1938 movie A Slight Case of Murder along with William H. Macy. In 2002 she played Lady Bird Johnson in the HBO award-winning movie Path to War and made a cameo appearance in Door to Door, which starred, and was written by, her husband. She also starred in Snap Decision (2001) with Mare Winningham, Raising Helen (2004) as Kate Hudson's character's older sister, and Christmas with the Kranks (2004), as the best friend of Jamie Lee Curtis's character.

=== 2004–2012: Desperate Housewives and Transamerica ===
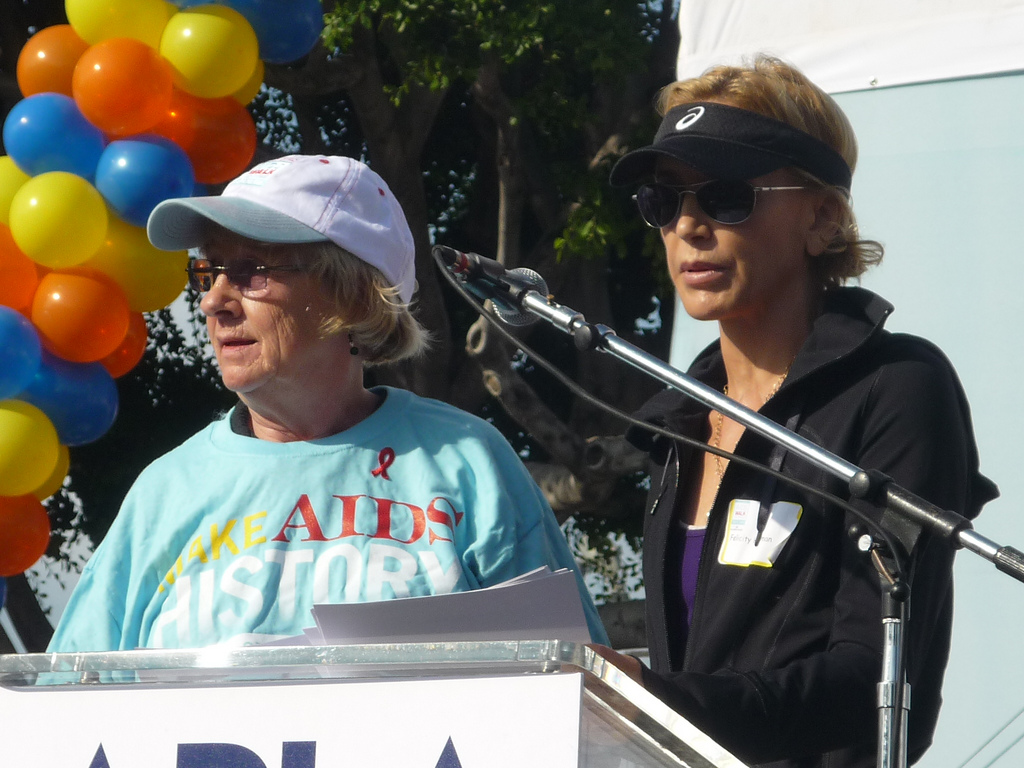
Huffman (right) with Kathryn Joosten in 2009

After a recurring role on the NBC sitcom Frasier, Huffman landed a leading role in an ABC comedy series Desperate Housewives, co-starring with Marcia Cross, Teri Hatcher, and Eva Longoria. Huffman won an Emmy Award for her work on Desperate Housewives (Outstanding Lead Actress in a Comedy Series) in 2005, as well as two 2006 Screen Actors Guild Awards (Best Actress - Comedy Series and part of Best Ensemble - Comedy Series) in 2006 and received several other awards. A report in November 2010 suggested that Huffman, along with co-star Teri Hatcher, would be quitting Desperate Housewives, but ABC denied the claim. The series ended in May 2012, after eight seasons.

In 2005, Huffman starred in the independent drama Transamerica, playing Bree, a transgender woman who discovers that she had fathered a son who is now a troubled teen hustler on the run. Huffman's performance in Transamerica was praised by many critics and garnered her a Golden Globe Award for Best Actress, as well as nominations for Best Actress (Screen Actors Guild) and Best Actress (Academy Awards), and several other awards and nominations. Huffman is now a voting member of the Academy of Motion Picture Arts and Sciences.

In 2007, Huffman starred in Garry Marshall's Georgia Rule with Jane Fonda and Lindsay Lohan, and 2008 on independent drama Phoebe in Wonderland. She made a film, Lesster, as a writer, director and actress in 2010.

=== 2013–present: Subsequent career and American Crime ===
Huffman said that after seeing her as Lynette Scavo on Housewives for eight years it was difficult for audiences to think of her as anything else. She said that's why she was eager for a role that's a distinctive departure. After Desperate Housewives finale, Huffman reunited with playwright David Mamet in the comedy play November. The play debuted on September 26 and ended on November 4, 2012. In 2012, she also appeared in the ensemble cast independent movie, Trust Me, opposite Clark Gregg.

On February 15, 2013, Huffman signed on for the lead role of the Fox drama pilot Boomerang, directed by Craig Brewer. The show centers on Margie Hamilton, a spy and master of disguise, who is the matriarch of the Hamilton clan, a "briskly professional assassin who can kill and dispose of a suspected terrorist in the afternoon – then switch to wife and mother mode without a hitch". However, Fox did not pick up Boomerang as a new series.

In 2013, Huffman starred in the independent drama Rudderless, and in the adventure film Big Game opposite Samuel L. Jackson. She also starred in another independent drama Stealing Cars, and was cast in the comedy film Zendog. In April 2014 she appeared in the independent film Cake opposite Jennifer Aniston.

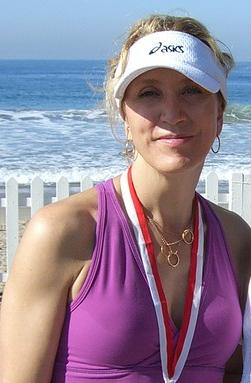
Huffman at the 2006 Malibu Triathlon

In 2014, Huffman was cast as the lead in the ABC anthology legal drama pilot American Crime created by John Ridley. The pilot was picked up to series in May 2014. On October 2, 2014, it was announced that Huffman would be star and executive producer alongside Carol Mendelsohn in her untitled drama about a special agent (Huffman) who is the fearless leader of a team of young agents on the New York City Joint Terrorism Task Force. The project was developed for ABC, but was not green-lighted for 2015–16 television season. American Crime debuted on ABC in March, 2015 and Huffman received critical acclaim for her performance as an antagonistic character. Robert Bianco from USA Today said in his review "A triumph for Oscar winner John Ridley, who created, produced and directed American Crime, and a reconfirmation that Felicity Huffman is one of the best actors we have... In no case is that truer than with Huffman's Barb, who is the morally questionable center of the story. Barb is a Lifetime movie heroine: a tough, divorced mother who raised her children alone, and is fighting now to bring her son's murderer to justice. Except this isn't that kind of show, and Barb's battles have not just made her stronger; they've made her hate all the people she's felt she had to fight. Which is why Huffman's gut-wrenching performance is so startling. A bundle of barely concealed fury, Huffman forces us to invest in a woman who thinks her bigotry makes her not just right, but noble."

In 2017, Huffman voiced a parody of herself in two episodes of the Netflix animated series BoJack Horseman. In 2018, Huffman starred in the second season of the Epix comedy-drama Get Shorty.

In 2019, Huffman starred in two Netflix projects: the Ava DuVernay miniseries When They See Us about the famous Central Park jogger case from 1989 in which a jogger was attacked in Central Park in New York City and in the comedy-drama film Otherhood based on the novel Whatever Makes You Happy by William Sutcliffe, She also starred in the drama film Tammy's Always Dying directed by Amy Jo Johnson. which had its world premiere at the Toronto International Film Festival in September 2019. It received generally positive reviews from critics, particularly for Huffman's and Phillips' performances. It was released through video on demand on May 1, 2020, by Quiver Distribution.

In November 2020, it was reported that Huffman would star in an ABC comedy television series pertaining to minor league baseball. However, the pilot was ultimately not picked up as a series.

In March 2023, Huffman appeared in an episode of The Good Doctor, in which she portrayed distinguished attorney Janet Stewart. Huffman was meant to reprise the role in a spin-off titled The Good Lawyer; however, this spin-off was cancelled due to the 2023 Writers Guild of America strike.

In 2025, she portrayed Rena Chynoweth, a former Mormon fundamentalist, in The Thirteenth Wife: Escaping Polygamy, a limited series on Lifetime.

== Personal life ==
Huffman and actor William H. Macy dated on and off for 15 years before they were married on September 6, 1997. They have two daughters, Sophia and Georgia. Huffman has appeared on television, in movies and on stage many times with her husband. The couple each received a star on the Hollywood Walk of Fame on March 7, 2012.

In 2005, Huffman revealed that she had had both anorexia and bulimia in her late teens and twenties.

Huffman is the co-author of the self-help book A Practical Handbook for the Boyfriend, published in November 2006. On March 1, 2012, Huffman launched What The Flicka, a website dedicated to women and mothers where she was a regular contributor. The website was reportedly deactivated in March 2019.

Huffman is a supporter of the Democratic Party. In 2016, Huffman voiced support for Hillary Rodham Clinton in the 2016 U.S. presidential election. In 2019, Huffman donated $400 to Kamala Harris's campaign in the 2020 U.S. presidential election.

Felicity Huffman has been a member of the Academy of Motion Picture Arts and Sciences in the Actors Branch since 2006.

=== Varsity Blues scandal ===
Huffman was among those charged by the U.S. Attorney's Office on March 12, 2019, in a nationwide college entrance exam cheating scandal. Prosecutors alleged that Huffman's $15,000 donation to the Key Worldwide Foundation, ostensibly a charitable contribution, was in fact payment to someone who posed as Huffman's daughter Sophia to take the SAT, receiving a score that showed significant improvement over Sophia's score on the Preliminary SAT (PSAT). Huffman was arrested at her California home on March 12 by FBI agents and IRS agents and charged with conspiracy to commit mail fraud and honest services fraud. She appeared on March 13 in Los Angeles Federal Court, where federal agents took her passport and the court released her on $250,000 bail. At her court appearance in Boston on April 3, she acknowledged her rights, charges and maximum possible penalties and then waived a pretrial hearing, signed conditions of her release and was allowed to leave. On April 8, she agreed to plead guilty to one count of conspiracy to commit mail fraud and honest services mail fraud.

Huffman formally pleaded guilty to honest services fraud on May 13 and to federal charges for paying $15,000 to have a proctor correct SAT questions answered incorrectly by her daughter. On September 13, she was sentenced to 14 days in jail and one year of supervised release, fined $30,000 and ordered to do 250 hours of community service. She reported to the Federal Correctional Institution in Dublin, California, on October 15 to begin her sentence. She was released on October 25, two days early, because October 27 fell on a weekend. No charges were filed against her husband and Sophia's father, actor and director William H. Macy.

In a November 2023 interview with KABC-TV, Huffman spoke about the Varsity Blues scandal for the first time, saying "It felt like I would be a bad mother if I didn't do it."

== Acting credits ==
=== Film ===
Year	Film	Role	Notes
1988	Things Change	Wheel of Fortune Girl	
1990	Reversal of Fortune	Minnie	
1992	Quicksand: No Escape	Joanna Reinhardt	
1995	Hackers	Attorney	
1997	The Spanish Prisoner	Pat McCune	
1999	Magnolia	Cynthia	
2003	House Hunting	Sheila	
2004	Raising Helen	Lindsay Davis	
2004	Christmas with the Kranks	Mary	
2005	Transamerica	Sabrina "Bree" Osbourne / Stanley Schupak	
2006	Choose Your Own Adventure: The Abominable Snowman	Pilot Nima	Voice
2007	Darius Goes West	Herself	
2007	Georgia Rule	Lilly	
2008	Phoebe in Wonderland	Hillary Lichten	
2010	Lesster	Mrs. Geary	Also writer and director
2013	Trust Me	Agnes	
2014	Rudderless	Emily	
2014	Big Game	CIA Director	
2014	Cake	Annette	
2015	Stealing Cars	Kimberly Wyatt	
2017	Krystal	Poppy	
2019	Otherhood	Helen Halston	
2019	Tammy's Always Dying	Tammy MacDonald	

=== Television ===
Year	Title	Role	Notes
1978	ABC Afterschool Special	Sara Greene	Episode: "A Home Run for Love"; credited as Flicka Huffman
1988	Lip Service	Woman P.A.	Television film
1991	Golden Years	Terry Spann	TV miniseries
1992	Raven	Sharon Prior	Episode: "And Everything Nice"
1992	The Water Engine	Dance Hall Girl	Television film
1992	The Heart of Justice	Annie	Television film
1992, 1997	Law & Order	Hillary Colson / Diane Perkins	Episodes: "Helpless" and "Working Mom"
1993	The X-Files	Dr. Nancy Da Silva	Episode: "Ice"
1996	Early Edition	Det. Tagliatti	Episode: "Pilot"
1996	Bedtime	Donna	TV miniseries
1996	Harrison: Cry of the City	Peggy Macklin	Television film
1997	Chicago Hope	Ellie Stockton	Episode: "Take My Wife, Please"
1998–2000	Sports Night	Dana Whitaker	Series regular, 45 episodes
1999	A Slight Case of Murder	Kit Wannamaker	Television film
2001	The West Wing	Ann Stark	Episode: "The Leadership Breakfast"
2001	Snap Decision	Carrie Dixon	Television film
2002	Path to War	Lady Bird Johnson	Television film
2002	Girls Club	Marcia Holden	Episode: "Pilot"
2003	Out of Order	Lorna Colm	TV miniseries
2002, 2003	Kim Possible	Dr. Betty Director	Voice, 2 episodes
2003	Frasier	Julia Wilcox	Recurring role, 8 episodes
2004	The D.A.	Charlotte Ellis	Recurring role, 3 episodes
2004	Reversible Errors	Gillian Sullivan	Television film
2004–2012	Desperate Housewives	Lynette Scavo	Series regular, 180 episodes
2006	Studio 60 on the Sunset Strip	Herself	Episode: "Pilot"
2015–2017	American Crime	Barb Hanlon; Leslie Graham; Jeanette Hesby	Season 1 (11 episodes); Season 2 (10 episodes); Season 3 (8 episodes)
2017	BoJack Horseman	Herself	Voice, 2 episodes
2018	Get Shorty	Special Agent Clara Dillard	10 episodes
2019	When They See Us	Linda Fairstein	Miniseries
2023	The Good Doctor	Janet Stewart	Episode: "The Good Lawyer"
2024	Criminal Minds: Evolution	Dr. Jill Gideon	Recurring role, 3 episodes
2024	Accused	Lorraine Howell	Episode: "Lorraine's Story"
2025	The Thirteenth Wife: Escaping Polygamy	Rena Chynoweth	2-episode limited series
2025–2026	Doc	Dr. Joan Ridley	Main cast (Season 2), 21 episodes

=== Theatre ===
Year	Title	Role	Notes
1982	A Taste of Honey	Jo	Stage Theatre, New York City
1986	Been Taken	Jill	18th Street Playhouse, New York City
1988	Speed-the-Plow	Karen	Royale Theatre, New York City
1988	Boys' Life	Maggie	Mitzi E. Newhouse Theater, New York City
1989	Bobby Gould in Hell	Glenna	Lincoln Center Theater, New York City
1990	Grotesque Love Songs	Romy	WPA Theatre, New York City
1990	Jake's Women	Julie	Old Globe Theatre, San Diego
1991	Three Sisters	Masha Sergeyevna	Philadelphia Festival Theatre
1994	Shaker Heights	Gertrude	Linda Gross Theater, New York City
1995	Dangerous Corner	Freda Chatfield	Linda Gross Theater, New York City
1995	The Cryptogram	Donny	American Repertory Theatre, Cambridge, Massachusetts; Westside Theatre, New York City
1997	The Joy of Going Somewhere Definite	Marie	Atlantic Theater Company, New York City
1999	Boston Marriage	Anna	American Repertory Theatre, Cambridge, Massachusetts
2012	November	Clarice Bernstein	Mark Taper Forum, Los Angeles
2015	The Anarchist	Cathy	Theater Asylum, Los Angeles
2024	Hir	Paige	Park Theatre, London

== Awards and honors ==
- 1998: Honored with the Grand Jury Award – Comedy (Performance) by the US Comedy Arts Festival.
- 2005: Best Actress Award - San Diego Film Festival
- 2012: Inducted into the Hollywood Walk of Fame receiving a star for her contribution to Television — received the 2,463rd star located at 7072 Hollywood, Blvd.
