= Aaron Ashmore =

Canadian actor (born 1979)

- Ashmore in 2026
- Born: Aaron Richard Ashmore; October 7, 1979 (age 47); Richmond, British Columbia, Canada
- Occupation: Actor
- Years active: 1991–present
- Spouse: Zoë Kate (m. 2014, divorced)
- Children: 2
- Relatives: Shawn Ashmore (twin brother)

Aaron Richard Ashmore (born October 7, 1979) is a Canadian actor. He is known for portraying Jimmy Olsen on Smallville (2006–2011), Steve Jinks on Warehouse 13 (2011–2014), and Johnny Jaqobis on Killjoys (2015–2019), the latter of which earned him a Canadian Screen Award nomination. He also portrayed Duncan Locke in Locke & Key (2020–2022) and has appeared in Veronica Mars, In Plain Sight, Ginny & Georgia (2023–present), and SkyMed (2022–present). In film, he starred in the thriller The Thaw (2009), earning a Leo Award nomination for Best Lead Performance.

== Early life ==
Aaron Richard Ashmore was born in Richmond, British Columbia, to Linda (née Davis), a homemaker, and Rick Ashmore, a manufacturing engineer. He was raised in Brampton, Ontario, where he attended Earnscliffe Senior Public School and Turner Fenton Secondary School.

Aaron and his identical twin brother, Shawn Ashmore, began appearing in television commercials while still in elementary school. Ashmore has said he is often cast as "the tough guy, the bully", a dynamic he enjoys because he finds those roles more complex than playing "the happy hero".

== Career ==
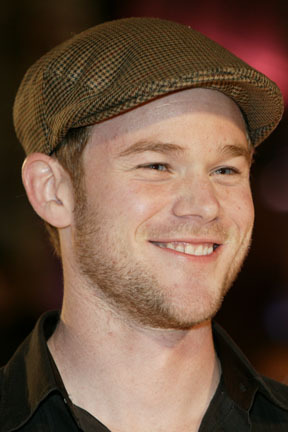
Ashmore in September 2007

=== Early work ===
Aaron Ashmore made his first notable screen appearance in 2004, starring as Canadian teenager Marc Hall in the TV movie Prom Queen: The Marc Hall Story. Around the same time, he appeared in Canadian TV films such as Safe and A Bear Named Winnie, and had guest spots on series like The Eleventh Hour, The West Wing, and 1-800-Missing. From 2004 to 2005, he had a recurring role on Veronica Mars, portraying Troy Vandegraff. These early roles established Ashmore in Canadian TV and genre dramas.

=== Breakthrough and television roles (2007–2014) ===
Ashmore broke through in the U.S. with a major role on Smallville. He was cast as photographer Jimmy Olsen beginning in the sixth season and continued to play him into its eighth season. He returned, portraying the younger brother of Jimmy Olsen, in the 2011 series finale, following his first character's earlier departure. In 2009, Ashmore headlined the eco-horror thriller The Thaw. His performance earned him a Leo Award nomination for Best Lead Performance by a Male in a Feature Length Drama the following year.

From 2010 to 2012, Ashmore had a six-episode recurring arc on series In Plain Sight as Scott Griffin, Mary Shannon's newly discovered half-brother. In 2011, Ashmore joined Syfy's Warehouse 13 as ATF agent Steve Jinks, a recurring character with the ability to detect lies introduced in the third season who appeared through the show's fifth and final season in 2014. He also made guest appearances on series like Lost Girl and Private Practice during this period.

=== Recent work (2014–present) ===
From 2015 to 2019, Ashmore co-starred as John Jaqobis on Syfy's space drama Killjoys. He was one of the three leads in the series, portraying a bounty hunter. Killjoys ran for five seasons, ending in 2019. That same year, Ashmore received a Canadian Screen Award nomination for Best Lead Actor in a Drama Series for his work on the show.

In film, Ashmore had a supporting role in Regression (2015) and appeared in TV movies such as Lifetime's Swept Under (2015) and Wish Upon a Christmas (2015). He later starred as Sean, a morally ambiguous tow-truck driver, in the Toronto-set crime thriller 22 Chaser (2018).

In 2020, Ashmore appeared as Duncan Locke in the fantasy television series Locke & Key, first in a recurring role during the first season and later as part of the main cast in the second season. He went on to appear in the second season of Ginny & Georgia (2023) as Gil Timmins, Georgia's ex-boyfriend and the father of her son, Austin. Since 2022, Ashmore has co-starred as Captain William "Wheezer" Heaseman in the Canadian medical drama series SkyMed, which follows the lives of air ambulance crews in remote Northern Canada. The series was renewed for a third season in 2024, when he was promoted to series regular.

Ashmore also co-stars in the Great American Media's mystery franchise The Ainsley McGregor Mysteries. He plays Jake Trenton, the love interest of Ainsley McGregor, in A Case for the Winemaker (2024) and A Case for the Yarn Maker (2025). Ashmore appears in the second season of Hallmark's Mistletoe Murders as Aaron.

== Personal life ==
Ashmore and his twin brother Shawn have matching tattoos on their wrists reading "GMA," which stands for "Good Man Ashmore." Aaron has said the tattoo is a tribute to their step-grandfather Gangu Jagtiani, who married their grandmother before the twins were born and was always regarded as their grandfather.

On June 20, 2014, Ashmore married Zoë Kate. The couple's first daughter was born in 2016. Their second daughter was born in 2019.

In March 2025, Ashmore revealed on the Inside of You podcast that he and Kate had quietly separated and finalized their divorce during the COVID‑19 pandemic.

A longtime science fiction fan, Ashmore has cited Star Trek: The Next Generation, Star Trek: Deep Space Nine, and The X-Files among his favorite shows.

== Filmography ==
=== Film ===
Year	Title	Role	Notes
1991	Married to It	Student in pageant	
2001	The Safety of Objects	Bobby Christianson	
2001	Treed Murray	Dwayne	
2002	The Skulls II	Matt "Hutch" Hutchinson	
2004	My Brother's Keeper	Eric / Lou Woods	
2004	Safe (short)	Bobby	
2007	Palo Alto	Alec	
2007	The Stone Angel	Matt Currie	
2008	Christmas Cottage	Pat Kinkade	
2009	The Thaw	Atom Galen	
2009	Fear Island	Mark	
2010	Privileged	Blake Webber	
2010	The Shrine	Marcus	
2011	Conception	Eric	
2011	Servitude	Chase Vanhaver	
2014	I Put a Hit on You	Ray	
2014	Big News from Grand Rock	Video store manager	
2015	Regression	George Nesbitt	
2018	22 Chaser	Sean	
2019	Tammy's Always Dying	Reggie Seamus	
2020	Sugar Daddy	Angus	
2021	The Retreat	James	
2023	Suze	Rick	

=== Television ===
Year	Title	Role	Notes
1993	Gross Misconduct: The Life of Brian Spencer	Young Byron Spencer	Television film
1993	Are You Afraid of the Dark?	Billy	Episode: "The Tale of the Thirteenth Floor"
1999	Crime in Connecticut: The Story of Alex Kelly	Luke Lawson	Television film
1999	Love Letters	Bob Bertram	Television film
1999	Emily of New Moon	Harrison Bowles	Episode: "A Fall from Grace"
2000	Run the Wild Fields	Charlie Upshall	Television film
2000	The Famous Jett Jackson	Robert	Episode: "Something to Prove"
2000	Are You Afraid of the Dark?	Jake	Episode: "The Tale of the Lunar Locusts"
2000	La Femme Nikita	Neil Hudson	Episode: "Time to Be Heroes"
2000	Twice in a Lifetime	Paul Harper	Episode: "Grandma's Shoes"
2001	Le porte-bonheur	Jean Philippe	Television film
2001	Blackout	Second Son	Television film
2001	Haven	Myles Billingsley Jr.	Television film
2001	The Familiar Stranger	Chris Welsh	Television film
2001	Dying to Dance	Jason	Television film
2001	Blue Murder		Episode: "Baby Point"
2002	Charms for the Easy Life	Ted	Television film
2002	Conviction	Whiff	Television film
2002	A Christmas Visitor	John Boyajian	Television film
2002	The Eleventh Hour	Trevor Gordon	Episode: "Tree Hugger"
2003	The Pentagon Papers	Randy Kehler	Television film
2004	Brave New Girl	Tyler	Television film
2004	Prom Queen: The Marc Hall Story	Marc Hall	Television film
2004	A Separate Peace	Chad	Television film
2004	A Bear Named Winnie	Randy Taylor	Television film
2004–2006	Veronica Mars	Troy Vandegraff	4 episodes, including "The Rapes of Graff"
2005	The Eleventh Hour	Taz Thomas	Episode: "Kettle Black"
2005	The West Wing	Trevor	Episodes: "365 Days", "King Corn"
2005–2006	Missing	Colin McNeil	Recurring role (season 3)
2006–2009, 2011	Smallville	Jimmy Olsen	Recurring role (season 6); main role (seasons 7–8); guest role (season 10)
2010	CSI: NY	Cam Vandemann	Episode: "Pot of Gold"
2010	The Bridge	Ben	Episode: "God Bless the Child"
2010	Private Practice	Carl	Episode: "Second Choices"
2010	Fringe	Matthew Rose	Episode: "Amber 31422"
2010–2012	In Plain Sight	Scott Griffin	Recurring role (season 3); guest role (season 5)
2011	The Listener	Peter Duquette	Episode: "Jericho"
2011	XIII: The Series	Dylan Masters	4 episodes
2011	Fanboy Confessional	Narrator	6 episodes
2011–2012	Lost Girl	Nate	Recurring role (season 2)
2011–2014	Warehouse 13	Steve Jinks	Recurring role (season 3); main role (seasons 4–5)
2012	Murdoch Mysteries	Jack London	Episode: "Murdoch of the Klondike"
2015–2019	Killjoys	John Jaqobis	Main role
2015	Swept Under	Nick Hopewell	Television film
2015	Wish Upon a Christmas	Jesse	Television film
2017	Ransom	Sydney Graves	Episode: "The Artist"
2019	Cardinal	Randall Wishart	4 episodes
2019	Designated Survivor	Phil Brunton	4 episodes
2019	Hudson & Rex	Galen Wheatcroft	Episode: "The French Connection"
2020	The Santa Squad	Gordon Church	Television film
2020	Pretty Cheaters, Deadly Lies	Counselor Parker	Television film
2020	Private Eyes	Larry Bateman	Episode: "The Proof is Out There"
2020–2022	Locke & Key	Duncan Locke	Recurring role (seasons 1 & 3); main role (season 2)
2022	Cider and Sunsets	Curtis	Television film
2022–present	SkyMed	William "Wheezer" Heaseman	Main cast
2023	Accused	Max	Episode: "Ava's Story"
2023–present	Ginny & Georgia	Gil Timmins	Recurring role (season 2–present)
2024	Ainsley McGregor Mysteries: A Case for the Winemaker	Jake Trenton	Television film
2025	Ainsley McGregor Mysteries: A Case for the Yarn Maker	Jake Trenton	Television film
2025	Mistletoe Murders	Aaron	Season 2
2026	Ainsley McGregor Mysteries: A Case for The Watchmaker	Jake Trenton	Television film
2026	I Will Find You	Ronald Dreason	Miniseries
2026	Law & Order Toronto: Criminal Intent	Jeremy Ellsworth	Episode: "Bad Campers"

== Awards and nominations ==
Year	Award	Category	Work	Result	Ref.
2010	Leo Awards	Best Lead Performance by a Male in a Feature Length Drama	The Thaw	Nominated	
2019	Canadian Screen Awards	Best Lead Actor, Drama Series	Killjoys	Nominated	
