= Heather Haldane =

Canadian television producer

Heather Gordon Haldane is a Canadian television producer. She is a co-founder of Screen Door Productions, Inc. with Mary Young Leckie. She was executive producer of the TV series MVP, and also worked on Shattered City: The Halifax Explosion and Prom Queen: The Marc Hall Story. In 1988 she produced Where the Spirit Lives.
