= Rémy Huberdeau =

Canadian film director, screenwriter

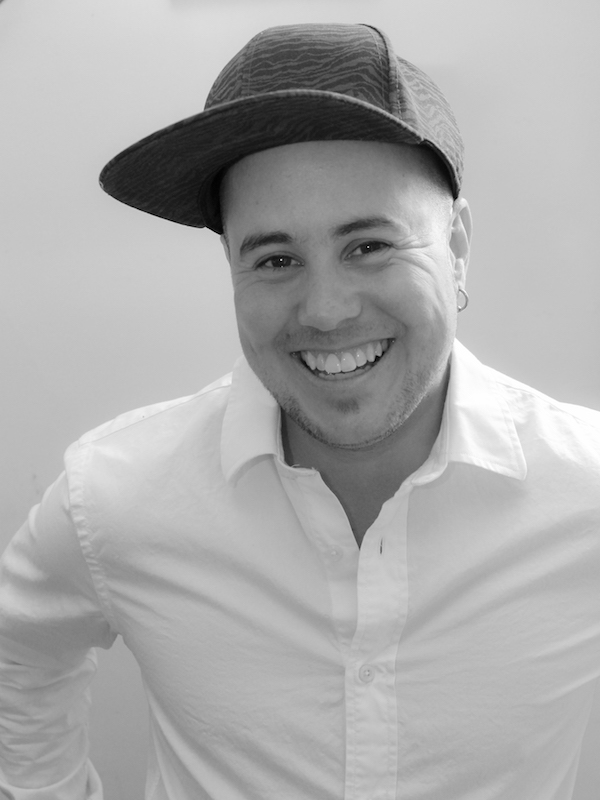
- Photo of Huberdeau, 2014
- Born: 1979 (age 46–47); Saint Boniface, Winnipeg, Manitoba, Canada
- Education: University of Manitoba (degree in Native Studies) Institut National de l'Image et du Son (graduated 2009)
- Years active: 2002-present

Rémy Huberdeau (born 1979) is a Canadian filmmaker from Winnipeg, Manitoba. He is transgender, and many of the films he has worked on or directed touch upon the topic of being transgender. He is currently based in Toronto, Ontario, Canada. He has worked on films in both French and English.

== Biography ==
Rémy Huberdeau was born and raised in the primarily French-speaking neighbourhood of Saint Boniface in Winnipeg, Manitoba, Canada. For his post-secondary education, he studied at the nearby University of Manitoba, where he acquired a degree in Native Studies. He is Franco-Manitoban. After university, Huberdeau moved to Montreal, Quebec, to pursue his passion of film-making. In 2009, he graduated from the Institut National de l’Image et du Son (INIS).

== Career ==
Huberdeau focuses his film-making on the documentary genre. His directorial debut, Love letter to Saint-Boniface (2002), is an experimental short documentary film about his hometown, and the homophobia he has experienced there. He directed this film when he was just 21 years old with the help of Video Pool, a non-profit film co-operative based in Winnipeg. Years later, Huberdeau released another experimental short documentary film, Home of the Buffalo (Au pays des esprits), in 2009, the same year he graduated from INIS. The school was involved in the making of this film, as it originated from a school-related exercise. This film has been categorised as a visual letter from Huberdeau to his father, while also combining archival photographs of working-class people from the 1920s.

In 2010, Huberdeau worked as an editor on a documentary about the residential school system in Canada, titled Courage to Remember: Stories of our Labrador Residential School Experience.

In 2013, Huberdeau released his most well-known film, a forty-six minute documentary titled Transgender Parents. As its title suggests, this film revolves around a few transgender people and how they raise their children, how they may differ from society's expectations, and their children's reactions to their transitions. He became involved with making this film after meeting Rachel Epstein, a co-founder of the Dykes Planning Tikes program in Toronto.

== Filmography ==
Title	Year	Role	Notes
Love letter to Saint-Boniface	2002	Director	Directorial debut Experimental documentary
Home of the Buffalo	2009	Director	Experimental documentary
Courage to Remember: Stories of our Labrador Residential School Experience	2010	Editor	Documentary
Transgender Parents	2013	Director	Documentary
