= LGBTQ rights in Canada =

- Legal status: Same-Sex Relations: Legal since 1969; Equal age of consent since 2019. Sexual Orientation and Gender Identity: Conversion therapy banned since 2022 in the Criminal Code.
- Gender identity: Change of name and legal sex available in every province and territory, under different rules, and without sex reassignment surgery
- Military: LGBTQ people allowed to serve openly since 1992
- Discrimination protections: Sexual Orientation: beginning provincially in 1977; federally since 1996; Gender identity and/or expression: Federally since 2017

Family rights
- Recognition of relationships: Same-sex marriage legal nationwide since 2005
- Adoption: Equal adoption rights for same-sex couples in all provinces and territories since 2011

Canadian pride flag

Canadian lesbian, gay, bisexual, transgender, and queer (LGBTQ) rights are some of the most extensive in the world. Same-sex sexual activity, in private between consenting adults, was decriminalized in Canada on June 27, 1969, when the Criminal Law Amendment Act, 1968–69 (also known as Bill C-150) was brought into force upon royal assent. In a landmark decision in 1995, Egan v Canada, the Supreme Court of Canada held that sexual orientation is constitutionally protected under the equality clause of the Canadian Charter of Rights and Freedoms. In 2005, Canada became the fourth country in the world, and the first in the Americas, that legalized same-sex marriage. In 2022, Canada was the third country in the world, and the first in North America, that statutorily banned conversion therapy nationwide for both minors and adults, and made it a crime to subject anyone to it, as defined by statutory law in the Criminal Code.

Canada was referred to as the most gay-friendly country in the world, when it was ranked first (indicating least dangerous) in Asher & Lyric's LGBTQ+ Danger Index in 2023. It was also ranked first in the Gay Travel Index chart in 2024, and ninth in the Equaldex Equality Index in 2024. The country's largest cities feature their own gay areas and communities, such as Toronto's Church and Wellesley neighbourhood, Montreal's Gay Village commercial district, Vancouver's Davie Village and Ottawa's Bank Street Gay Village. Every summer, Canada's LGBTQ community celebrates pride in all major cities, with many political figures from the federal, provincial and municipal scenes.

In recent decades, Canada went through some major legal shifts in support of LGBTQ rights (e.g., decriminalization, anti-discrimination, anti-harassment, gay marriage, homoparentality, blood donations, transgender rights and outlawing of conversion therapies). The 2020 Pew Research showed that 85% of Canada's general population (92% among Canadians aged between 18 and 29) had favoured social acceptance of homosexuality, up from 80% in 2013. Likewise, polls in June 2013 had shown an increase in the Canadian population's point of view, with a vast majority of Canadians giving their blessing to same-sex marriage, which was made available to all throughout Canada in 2005. The polls had also revealed that 70% of Canada's population had agreed that "same-sex couples should have the same rights to adopt children as heterosexual couples do," and that 76% had also agreed that "same-sex couples are just as likely as other parents to successfully raise children". By 2020, 91.8% of those surveyed in a poll commissioned by the Privy Council Office said they would be "comfortable" if a next-door neighbour was gay, lesbian or bisexual and that 87.6% said they would be "comfortable" if a neighbour was a transgender person.

== History ==
World map of nonbinary gender recognition Nonbinary / third gender option available as voluntary opt-in Opt-in for intersex people only Standard for third gender Standard for intersex Nonbinary / third gender option not legally recognized / no data

Transgender people and cross-dressing practices have been recorded and documented in Canada for centuries. Different Indigenous groups have had their own traditions and terms to refer to transgender people, gender variance or sexual identity. These First Nations had perceptions towards gender and sexuality which differed significantly to that of the Western world. Many transgender people in these traditional roles were in positions of reverence, where they acted as caretakers of children who had lost their families, spiritual healers and warriors in battle. The Cree term napêw iskwêwisêhot refers to people who are assigned male at birth but act, dress and behave as female, while the term iskwêw ka napêwayat has the opposite meaning, that being a person assigned female at birth but acts and behaves as male. Similarly, the Ktunaxa titqattek describes women who take on roles traditionally characterized as masculine, including hunting and warfare. The Blackfoot term aakíí'skassi (meaning "acts like a woman"; also spelt a'yai-kik-ahsi) describes men who dress as women and typically perform chores and activities associated with women, such as basket weaving and pottery making. Many other Indigenous groups recognise similar terms: the Inuit sipiniq (ᓯᐱᓂᖅ), the Assiniboine wįktą, the Tlingit gatxan, and the Tsimshian kanâ'ts. Among the Ojibwe, male-to-female individuals are known as ikwekaazo, which literally translates to "men who chose to function as women", whereas female-to-male individuals are known as ininiikaazo. The European colonialists would describe such individuals as "homosexuals", "a curious compound of man and woman", or "berdache", meaning a catamite or a male prostitute. The term is now considered offensive and outdated. Following colonisation and the spread of Christianity by religious missionaries, many of these traditions began to die out. Transgender individuals were furthermore forced and assimilated into Europe-centric culture, and even among the Indigenous peoples perceptions began to change. In the early 1990s, Indigenous groups sought to reclaim many of their customs and traditions. LGBTQ Indigenous groups proposed the term "two-spirit" to refer to a traditional and cultural "third gender". In modern times, two-spirit is frequently used by First Nations groups to refer to people who embody these gender traits, and is occasionally used to reference the entire Indigenous LGBTQ community. As such, the terms LGBT2S or LGBTQ2S are increasingly used, with the 2S denoting two-spirited people; sometimes, this is denoted simply as 2, as in LGBTQ2. Records of homosexuality and same-sex relations also exist, notably among the Mi'kmaq, where the common phrase Geenumu Gessalagee, which translates to "he loves men", is used to refer to such individuals.

During the British North American era, sexual activity between men was a capital crime. However, there is no surviving record of any executions; political figures were reluctant to enforce the law. The death penalty was eventually repealed, though a broader law involving gross indecency between men was often enforced in the late 19th century. During the early to mid 20th-century, the law often portrayed homosexual men as sex offenders, including the court case of Everett George Klippert. He admitted to having sex with multiple men, which resulted in his life imprisonment. Same-sex sexual activity between consenting adults was soon decriminalized in 1969 as a result of legislation introduced in 1967, with then-Justice Minister and Attorney General of Canada Pierre Trudeau who eventually became the 15th Prime Minister of Canada and famously commented, "There's no place for the state in the bedrooms of the nation."

Up until 1973, homosexuality was considered to be a mental illness. Many treatments were used to cure people of their homosexual orientation, including electroshock therapy, lobotomies, and conversion therapies. In 1973, the American Psychiatric Association decided that homosexuality is not a mental illness. As a result, homosexuality was withdrawn from the Diagnostic Statistical Manual (DSM), which is the diagnostic reference guide used by all health and social services professionals in North America. In 1999, the American Psychological Association acknowledged in its code of ethics that to treat homosexuality as a psychological problem, a sexual deviance, or a form of psychopathology is unethical.

Same-sex marriage became legal in Ontario in 2003, and was already legalized in eight of ten provinces and one of three territories when, on July 20, 2005, Canada became the first country outside Europe and the fourth country in the world to legalize same-sex marriage nationwide after the enactment of the federal Civil Marriage Act. Likewise, same-sex adoption was legalized in all provinces and territories under varying rules. Discrimination on the basis of sexual orientation and gender identity or expression in employment, housing and public and private accommodations is now prohibited by all provinces and territories, as well as the federal government. Transgender people are now able to change their legal gender in all provinces and territories under varying rules.

== Constitutional framework ==
=== Legal and equality rights ===
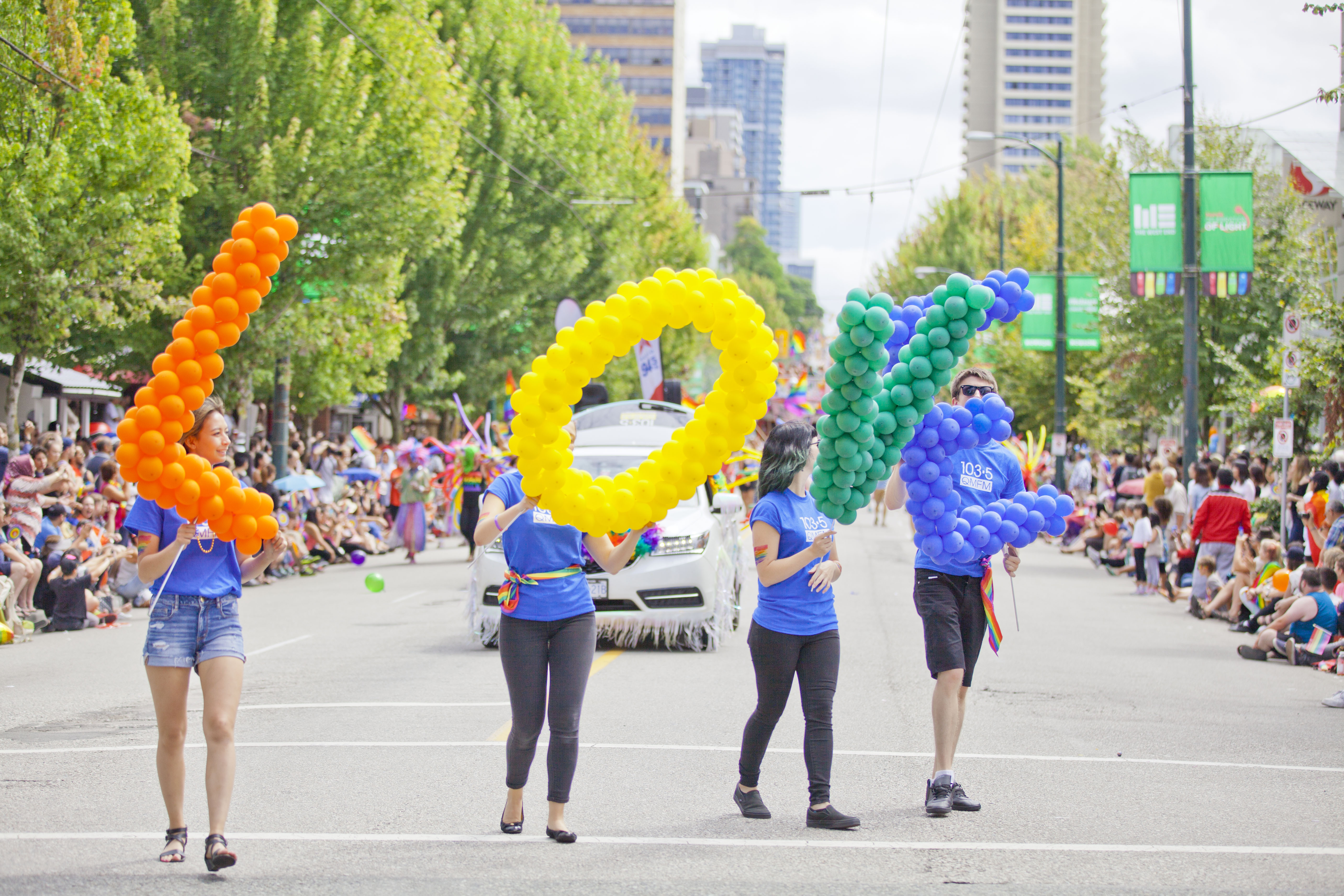
Participants at the 2016 Vancouver Pride parade

The Constitution of Canada does not explicitly grant or deny any right to LGBTQ people, however the Supreme Court of Canada has held that the open-ended wording of section 15 of the Charter protects LGBTQ people from discrimination based on sexual orientation. Subsection 15(1) reads:

15(1) Every individual is equal before and under the law and has the right to the equal protection and equal benefit of the law without discrimination and, in particular, without discrimination based on race, national or ethnic origin, colour, religion, sex, age or mental or physical disability.

Section 15(1) was written so as to protect against discrimination generally, with the enumerated grounds of prohibited discrimination, such race and sex, being examples of prohibited grounds, rather than a closed list. In its landmark ruling in 1995 in the case of Egan v. Canada, the Supreme Court of Canada declared that sexual orientation was included within the bounds of section 15, as an analogous ground. Individuals were therefore granted equal protection against discrimination on the basis of that ground. The concepts of sex and physical disability in s. 15 have been interpreted to include transsexuality and HIV/STDs (see discussion below). As articulated, and reaffirmed in 2008, "the promotion of equality entails the promotion of a society in which all are secure in the knowledge that they are recognized at law as human beings equally deserving of concern, respect and consideration".

Section 15 applies to all laws and government institutions in Canada, including law enforcement authorities, but the Charter does not grant rights against the private sector. Instead, a complaint against a business would be brought under the applicable federal or provincial human rights statute. For example, a discrimination complaint against a restaurant would generally fall under provincial anti-discrimination legislation and not the Charter. However, the Charter is part of the Constitution and therefore is part of the supreme law of the land. Courts must interpret statutes consistently with the Charter, including human rights laws. In private litigation, including human rights cases, "courts should, from time to time, re-evaluate the consistency of the common law with evolving societal expectations through the lens of Charter values". Equality rights under the Charter therefore will provide guidance for the interpretation of equality rights set out in human rights laws.

In its 1998 decision in Vriend v Alberta, the Supreme Court found the failure of the provincial legislature to include sexual orientation as a prohibited ground of discrimination in its human rights law was itself a violation of section 15 Charter rights. As of 2017, all provinces, territories, and the federal government explicitly include sexual orientation and gender identity as prohibited grounds of discrimination in their human rights acts.

=== Reasonable limits ===
The entire Charter is also subject to a general limit in section 1 that allows "such reasonable limits prescribed by law as can be demonstrably justified in a free and democratic society." The Oakes Test sets out the Supreme Court of Canada's interpretation of this exception. This analysis may consider conflicting Charter rights. For example, the right to equality based on sexual orientation under section 15 may be limited by the freedom of religion under section 2, and vice versa. It may also be limited by the right to denominational (religious) schools under Section 93 of the Constitution.

=== Enforcement mechanism ===
In the last decades, the rights of LGBTQ Canadians were largely enhanced due to several court decisions decided under Section 15 of the Canadian Charter of Rights and Freedoms (French: Charte canadienne des droits et libertés), which was included in the Constitution of Canada in 1982, and came into force in 1985.

Some of the cases were funded under the Federal Government's Court Challenges Program, which in 1985 was expanded to fund test cases challenging federal legislation in relation to the equality rights guaranteed by the Charter. There were also funding to challenge provincial laws under a variety of programs, but its availability had differed considerably from province to province.

=== Notwithstanding clause ===
In addition, section 15 is subject to section 33 of the Charter (the "notwithstanding clause") that allows the federal Parliament and the provincial Legislatures to declare that a law is exempt from certain sections of the Charter for up to five years, which exemption may be renewed any number of times.

In 2000, Alberta amended its Marriage Act to define marriage as being between a man and a woman. The law invoked the notwithstanding clause of the Charter, but the amendment was nevertheless invalid since the capacity to marry is a matter of exclusive federal jurisdiction according to the Constitution. The notwithstanding clause can only be used to make exceptions to the Charter; it cannot change the federal division of powers. In any case, the five-year exemption period expired in 2005.

In 2023, Saskatchewan passed The Education (Parents’ Bill of Rights) Amendment Act, 2023 while also invoking the notwithstanding clause. One area of controversy regarding the new law was the requirement of schools to obtain parental consent for students under the age of 16 who request the use of their gender-related preferred name or gender identity. Calls to repeal the law from human rights groups led to legal action against the law, even if the notwithstanding clause may prevent the law from being repealed for Charter violations.

In 2024, Alberta passed 3 laws: Health Statutes Amendment Act, 2024, Education Amendment Act, 2024, and Fairness and Safety in Sport Act. These laws were met with legal challenges in Alberta courts, but the Alberta government prevented the challenges by passing Bill 9: Protecting Alberta’s Children Statutes Amendment Act, 2025, which used the notwithstanding clause.

The notwithstanding clause has never been used by the federal Parliament. It is generally believed that such a use would constitute a politically embarrassing admission that the law in question should violate human rights.

However, the notwithstanding clause is no gateway for a government to exercise unjust or oppressive uses of political power. Section 33 of the Charter, as the entire Charter, is also subject to section 1, and, as it applies only to sections 2 and 7 to 15, is of no force or effect for overriding section 1.

=== Division of jurisdiction between federal government and provinces ===
In addition to the Charter, another significant constitutional factor is the division of authority between the federal government and the provincial governments. Under the Constitution of Canada, some matters are allocated to the exclusive jurisdiction of the federal Parliament, while other matters are allocated to the exclusive jurisdiction of the provincial legislatures. Many of the issues which have direct impact on LGBTQ rights are under provincial jurisdiction.

Major subjects under federal jurisdiction are the criminal law power, and marriage and divorce. The criminal law power can deal with matters such as hate speech and sentence modifiers for bias motives. In the past, it has been used to criminalise LGBTQ conduct. The federal jurisdiction over marriage and divorce gives Parliament the power to determine which parties can marry, and also the rules governing divorces, also LGBTQ issues of interest.

Subjects under provincial jurisdiction include matters such as spousal support for unmarried couples, adoption, filiation of children, vital statistics (including identity documents such as birth certificates), child custody and support, education, housing, health care, pensions and social security. As well, most workplaces fall under provincial jurisdiction.

Human rights law follows this allocation of subjects. The Canadian Human Rights Act is of relatively limited application, applying mainly to the federal government and federally regulated workplaces, such as banks, aviation, and inter-provincial transportation. Provincial human rights laws apply to a much broader range of subjects. Provincial human rights laws apply to most schools, rental housing and health care, and workplaces.

== Legality of same-sex sexual activity ==
=== Overview ===
Same-sex sexual activity has been legal in Canada since 1969. Since June 2019, the general age of consent for all sexual activities has been 16. However, where there is a relationship of trust, authority or dependency, the age of consent is 18. The relationship must not be exploitative of the young person. Any form of sexual abuse and exploitation is seriously proscribed by law in respect of any person, regardless of age. Age of consent laws also provide "close in age" exceptions for young persons aged 12 through 15. Those exceptions are also subject to the same prohibitions where there is a position of trust or an exploitative relationship.

=== History of decriminalization ===
During the British North American era, same-sex sexual activity between men was a capital crime. The death penalty was eventually repealed and a broader law involving gross indecency between men was often enforced in the late 19th century.

In June 1969, Parliament passed the Criminal Law Amendment Act, 1968–69, which decriminalized sexual activity between men, with a higher age of consent, set at 21 years. In 1987, the age of consent for homosexual practices was set at 14, which was the age of consent for heterosexual sex. However, section 159 of the Criminal Code continued to make it a criminal offence to engage in anal intercourse with a woman or with a man if one of the parties was under 18 (with an exception if the act was committed by a married couple) or if more than two persons were present in the room where it took place.

After the enactment of the Charter, courts in Ontario, Quebec, British Columbia, Nova Scotia, and Alberta each independently declared section 159 to be unconstitutional as a violation of the equality provision of the Charter. Since the early 2000s, no conviction for private and consensual anal sex appears to have taken place; in more recent times, some individuals were charged with the offence, but ultimately declared not guilty.

On November 15, 2016, the Liberal Government introduced legislation to repeal section 159 of the Criminal Code. The bill, C-32, would have set the age of consent for anal intercourse to 16, which has been the age of consent for all other types of sexual activities since 2016. The bill was later incorporated into a new bill, C-75, which was tabled in late March 2018. Liberal MP Randy Boissonnault, a special advisor to the prime minister on LGBTQ2 issues, stated on behalf of the Government: "We heard from the community that section 159 is a piece of archaic legislation that has continued to affect young men, so it's important to get this debated and passed through the house." On June 21, 2019, the bill received royal assent and was enacted as law.

=== Apology to LGBTQ people ===
On November 28, 2017, Prime Minister Justin Trudeau issued a formal apology in Parliament to members of the LGBTQ community:

It is with shame and sorrow and deep regret for the things we have done that I stand here today and say: We were wrong. We apologize. I am sorry. We are sorry... To members of the LGBTQ communities, young and old, here in Canada and around the world: You are loved. And we support you. To the trailblazers who have lived and struggled, and to those who have fought so hard to get us to this place: thank you for your courage, and thank you for lending your voices. I hope you look back on all you have done with pride. It is because of your courage that we're here today, together, and reminding ourselves that we can, and must, do better. For the oppression of the lesbian, gay, bisexual, transgender, queer, and two-spirit communities, we apologize. On behalf of the government, Parliament, and the people of Canada: We were wrong. We are sorry. And we will never let this happen again.

— Prime Minister Justin Trudeau, 28 November 2017

On June 21, 2018, the Governor General granted royal assent to the Expungement of Historically Unjust Convictions Act (French: Loi sur la radiation de condamnations constituant des injustices historiques). The Act allows a person who was convicted of certain homosexual acts prior to their being lawful in 1969, or later on, of anal intercourse under the now repealed section 159 of the Criminal Code, to have the RCMP, and federal departments or agencies, "destroy or remove any judicial record of the conviction". The Act also requires that any provincial or municipal police force, or courts, which were involved in such convictions to be notified of the expungement order.

The Parole Board of Canada has stated that an expungement is different from a record suspension or pardon, which is for those who were duly convicted of a crime.

With expungement, the Government recognizes that those whose record of conviction constitutes a historical injustice should not be viewed as "former offenders." Their conviction was for an act that should never have been a crime and had the conviction occurred today, it would likely be inconsistent with the Canadian Charter of Rights and Freedoms. If an application for expungement is approved, federal records of that conviction will be destroyed or removed. Unlike a record suspension/pardon, expungement is also available to those both living and deceased.

One commentator stated that while a pardon is about the Queen forgiving someone for doing something wrong, an expungement means: "The Queen did something wrong. Will you forgive her?"

=== Police chiefs of Canada apology ===
In December 2020, Police chiefs of Canada made a formal apology – for the decades of oppression and opposition towards homosexuality and LGBTQ rights within the 1960s through to today across Canada.

We felt on the International Day of Human Rights this year was the right opportunity for us to make the apology, to reconcile our past, and to begin the healing process moving forward. On behalf of the Canadian Association of Chiefs of Police, I want to sincerely apologize for the harm we caused by not fully supporting Two-spirit, Lesbian, Gay, Bisexual, Transgender, and Queer Communities. We now have a better understanding of the impact that specific laws, policies and decisions had on the community and how we contributed to institutional bias, intolerance, and the violation of human rights. We acknowledge the pain our actions have caused, the personal suffering, shame and trauma our public positions contributed to, and the deep distrust and divide that was created by the positions we took. We take responsibility for our past wrongdoings and, on behalf of the Canadian Association of Chiefs of Police, I am sorry.

— Bryan Larkin, president of the Canadian Association of Chiefs of Police, 10 December 2020

It is critical for all Canadian police services to show support to Two-Spirit, Lesbian, Gay, Bisexual, Trans, Transgender, and Queer (2SLGBTQ+) members within communities and organizations across Canada. We must stand together against homophobia, transphobia, and any other kind of marginalization, shaming, disrespect or hate. To ensure the national strategic priority would be translated into tangible and practical actions, the CACP created the Equity, Diversity and Inclusion Committee with a mandate to support efforts to create and enhance police practices that promote fairness, equity and inclusion through the identification, mitigation and elimination of the impact of implicit bias and discrimination in practices and policies that may support systemic barriers, and to promote the advancement of diversity within policing institutions. It is essential for police organizations to recognize the impact of their words and actions. While we have improved to better practice and uphold principles of equity, diversity and human rights, there is still much work to be done and the CACP is working hard to support police organizations across the country in their efforts to champion the systemic changes that need to be made to create an inclusive and equitable society for all.

— Deputy Chief Roger Wilkie & Suelyn Knight, Co-chairs of the CACP Equity, Diversity and Inclusion Committee, 10 December 2020

== Recognition of same-sex relationships ==
=== Same-sex marriage ===
==== Provincial initiatives ====
Even before 2005, when Parliament enacted the Civil Marriage Act implementing same-sex marriage across the country, same-sex relationships were already recognized by many provinces, as some provincial statutes were already assigning the same rights and obligations to same-sex and opposite-sex couples living together.

In 2001, Saskatchewan enacted a pair of statutes relating to domestic relations. The two acts amended all provincial statutes which related to the rights and obligations of married couples and common law couples, and applied them equally to all common law couples, whether opposite-sex or same-sex couples.

In 2002, Quebec addressed the situation of conjoints de fait (de facto spouses), which is not a matrimony but a union of which rights, duties and obligations are relative to specific fields, most commonly tax credits and family allowances, and vary from one to another, equally for both same-sex and opposite-sex couples, depending on whether or not they have a written agreement called a contract before a civil law notary, as to determine the right of ownership after separation or death. That year, the National Assembly amended the Civil Code of Quebec to provide same-sex and opposite-sex couples with an all-encompassing solution, a third option, the most extensive possible within provincial jurisdiction. The amendments created a legal status of civil unions. Couples who choose to form such a union, regardless of gender or sexual orientation, benefit from the same effects as those of marriage, "as regards the direction of the family, the exercise of parental authority, contribution towards expenses, the family residence, the family patrimony and the compensatory allowance." Since then, in addition to being bound to share a community of life, and owing each other respect, fidelity, succour and assistance, civil union spouses, unlike conjoints de faits (de facto spouses), automatically have the same rights, duties and obligations as married couples. However, unlike marriage, which is under federal jurisdiction, a civil union is valid only in Quebec, and may not be recognized outside of the province. The couple may be faced with unexpected problems if they are outside Quebec.

==== Court decisions ====
Between 2002 and 2005, courts in several provinces and one territory ruled that restricting marriage to opposite-sex couples is a form of discrimination that is prohibited by Section 15 of the Charter. The courts struck down the common law definition of marriage used under federal law, and held that same-sex couples had the right to marry in those jurisdictions. Trial courts deferred the effect of their rulings, to allow the federal government time to consider whether it would enact legislation or appeal the decisions. However, the Ontario Court of Appeal in its decision held that the new definition came into effect immediately in Ontario. Courts in other provinces and one territory followed that approach, with the result that those Canadian jurisdictions became the third in the world to allow same-sex marriage, after the Netherlands and Belgium. By July 2005, same-sex marriages were legally recognized in all provinces and territories except Alberta, Prince Edward Island, the Northwest Territories and Nunavut, encompassing over 85% of Canada's population.

==== Federal government response ====
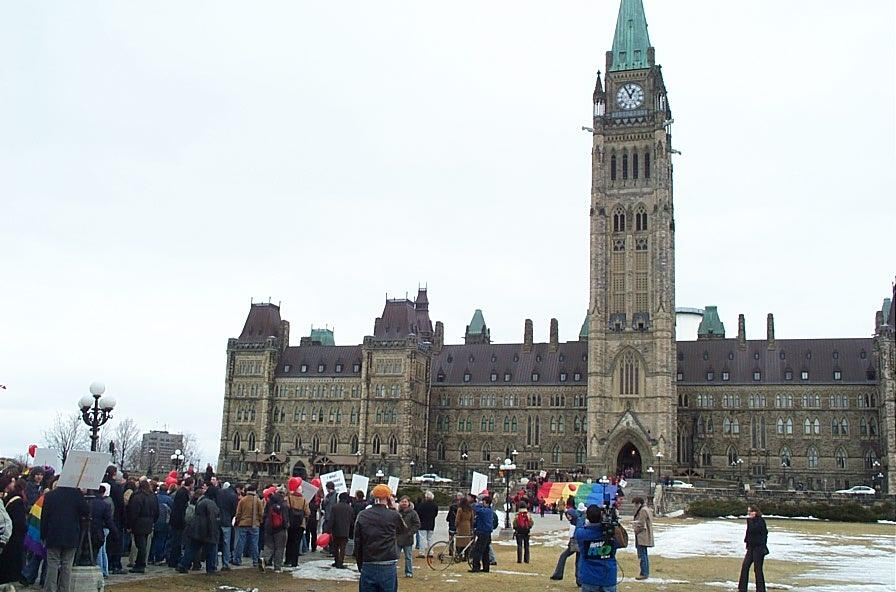
"March of Hearts" rally for same-sex marriage in Canada on Parliament Hill in Ottawa, March 6, 2004

The Federal Government announced in the summer of 2003 that it would not appeal the decisions, and would draft legislation to allow same-sex marriages across the country. The bill was put before the Supreme Court of Canada to ensure that it would withstand a Charter challenge by those who oppose same-sex marriage. In December 2004, the Supreme Court declared the proposed definition of "marriage" as being consistent with respect to all matters referred to in the Charter, and as falling within the exclusive legislative authority of the Parliament of Canada.

Parliament passed the bill on July 20, 2005, making Canada the fourth country to legalize same-sex marriage nationwide, and the first to do so without a residency requirement.

==== Public opinion ====
One study by Mark W. Lehman suggests that between 1997 and 2004, Canadian public opinion on legalizing same-sex marriage underwent a dramatic shift: moving from minority support to majority support and that this support was the result of a significant shift in positive feelings towards gays and lesbians.

=== Adoption ===
The first province to allow adoption of children by same-sex couples in Canada was British Columbia in 1996. Since then, adoption by same-sex couples has been legalized in Ontario (1999), Nova Scotia (2001), Saskatchewan (2001), Newfoundland and Labrador (2002), Quebec (2002), Manitoba (2002), the Northwest Territories (2002) and Yukon (2003). In Alberta, stepchild adoption was legalized in 1999. Eight years later, in 2007, joint adoption became legal in Alberta. New Brunswick legalized joint adoption in 2008, while Prince Edward Island did so in 2009. Nunavut legalized adoption by same-sex couples in 2011, and thus became the last province or territory in Canada to do so. Three provinces (British Columbia, Ontario, and Saskatchewan) will grant parental status to three or more intentional parents allowing for a wider range of queer and trans families. These parents may be in addition or in place of the birth parent. However, some find the "law operated within some strong normative constraints."

== Discrimination and harassment protections ==
=== Enforcement mechanism ===
The Federal Government and every province and territory in Canada have enacted human rights acts that prohibit discrimination and harassment on several grounds (e.g. race, sex, gender identity or expression, marital status, religion, disability, age and sexual orientation) in private and public sector employment, housing, public services and publicity. Some acts also apply to additional activities. These acts are quasi-constitutional laws that override ordinary laws as well as regulations, contracts and collective agreements. They stand by the rule that every person has the right to the equal benefit of the law. They are typically enforced by human rights commissions and tribunals through a complaint investigation, conciliation and arbitration process that is slow, but free, and includes protection against retaliation. A lawyer is not required.

=== Anti-discrimination definitions ===
Sexual orientation is not defined in any human rights act, but is widely interpreted as meaning heterosexuality, homosexuality and bisexuality. It does not include transgender people. The Federal Court of Canada has stated that sexual orientation "is a precise legal concept that deals specifically with an individual's preference in terms of gender" in sexual relationships, and is not vague or overly broad.

As of 2017, all human rights acts include "gender expression" and/or "gender identity" as prohibited grounds for discrimination. Previously, human rights tribunals had interpreted their human rights acts as including gender identity and gender expression under the category of "sex" as a prohibited ground for discrimination.

The Ontario Human Rights Commission has adopted the following definition:

Sexual orientation is more than simply a 'status' that an individual possesses; it is an immutable personal characteristic that forms part of an individual's core identity. Sexual orientation encompasses the range of human sexuality from gay and lesbian to bisexual and heterosexual orientations.

And defines gender identity and gender expression as follows:

Gender identity is each person's internal and individual experience of gender. It is their sense of being a woman, a man, both, neither, or anywhere along the gender spectrum. A person's gender identity may be the same as or different from their birth-assigned sex. Gender identity is fundamentally different from a person's sexual orientation. Gender expression is how a person publicly presents their gender. This can include behaviour and outward appearance such as dress, hair, make-up, body language and voice. A person's chosen name and pronoun(s) are also common ways of expressing gender.

Similar definitions exist in other provinces' Human rights commissions, for example, Quebec's Commission defines sexual orientation as the emotional or sexual attraction to someone, and, as a personal characteristic, as being permanent or difficult to change.

All human rights laws in Canada also explicitly prohibit discrimination based on disability, which has been interpreted to include AIDS, ARC and being HIV-positive, and membership in a high-risk group for HIV infection.

=== Federal law ===
On June 20, 1996, the Canadian Human Rights Act (CHRA; French: Loi canadienne sur les droits de la personne) was amended to include sexual orientation as a protected ground. The CHRA guarantees the right to equality, equal opportunity, fair treatment and an environment free from discrimination in employment and the provision of goods, services, facilities or accommodation within federal jurisdiction, such as federal departments and agencies, the Canadian Armed Force, banks, radio and television stations, airlines, and interprovincial transportation facilities.

Attempts to add "gender identity and expression" as protected grounds began when NDP MP Bill Siksay introduced a private member's bill in the House of Commons in 2005. When it failed to pass before Parliament was dissolved, he reintroduced the bill in 2006 and again in 2009, with additional provisions to add gender identity and expression to the hate crimes provisions of the Criminal Code. In February 2011, it passed third reading in the House of Commons with support from all parties, but was not considered in the Senate before Parliament was dissolved for the 41st Canadian federal election. Similar bills were introduced in the next Parliament, and Randall Garrison's bill was passed in the House of Commons, but it died on the Senate order paper when the 2015 federal election was called.

In May 2016, the government introduced An Act to amend the Canadian Human Rights Act and the Criminal Code, to add "gender identity or expression" in the Canadian Human Rights Act and the hate crimes provisions of the Criminal Code. In June 2017, the Canadian Parliament passed the bill and it received royal assent a week later. The law went into effect immediately.

=== Provincial and territorial laws ===
In 1977, the Quebec Charter of Human Rights and Freedoms, which is both a charter of rights and a human and youth rights act, was amended to prohibit discrimination based on sexual orientation, and later harassment, in 1982, making it the first province in Canada to pass a gay civil rights law. Thus, the province of Quebec became the first jurisdiction in the world larger than a city or county to prohibit sexual orientation discrimination, and harassment (including but not limited to mockery, insult, bullying, and intimidation at school, or at work), in the private and public sectors. The law was later amended to include gender identity and gender expression in 2016. Since 2008, Quebec's Ministry of Justice has specifically been assigned for the fight against homophobia, so as to perform full social acceptance among and within Quebec's population. "The mandate of the Bureau de lutte contre l'homophobie is to oversee the implementation, monitoring and assessment of the Government Action Plan against Homophobia," which "promotes respect for the rights of sexual minority members," and sets down "the creation of safe, inclusive environments," as one of its five priorities. The Quebec Charter specifically states that a clause having been stipulated in a juridical act and involving discrimination is without effect. In 2024, Quebec has reinforced its laws in order to prevent and fight harassment in the workplace, whether psychological or sexual; discriminatory harassment is also considered psychological or sexual harassment if it is based on any of the grounds set out in the Charter.

Sexual orientation was added to the Ontario Human Rights Code in December 1986, resulting in part from activism and debate following the 1975 firing of John Damien, a racing steward at Woodbine Racetrack, for being gay.

In 1984, in Manitoba, LGBTQ activists pushed for inclusion of protection from discrimination on the grounds of sexual orientation with tactics including a 59-day hunger strike by Richard North. In 1987, Manitoba passed the Human Rights Code which included protections from discrimination based on sexual orientation.

In 1998, the Supreme Court ruled in Vriend v. Alberta that the exclusion of sexual orientation from human rights acts was a violation of section 15(1) of the Charter of Rights and Freedoms. Sexual orientation was thus protected by law under every jurisdiction in Canada. In 2009, Alberta became the last jurisdiction in Canada to add "sexual orientation" to its human rights code.

Since June 2017, all provincial and territorial human rights legislation explicitly prohibits discrimination based on gender identity, and some also explicitly include gender expression.

=== LGBTQ discrimination protections table ===
Jurisdiction	Sexual orientation	Gender identity	Gender expression	Conversion therapy ban
Canada (federal)	Yes (since 1996)	Yes (since 2017)	Yes (since 2017)	Yes — Nationwide (Since 7 January 2022)
Alberta	Yes (since 2009)	Yes (since 2015)	Yes (since 2015)	Banned in some municipalities prior to enactment of federal ban: Strathcona County, St. Albert, and Edmonton since 2019; Calgary, Lethbridge, the Regional Municipality of Wood Buffalo, and Spruce Grove since 2020; and Fort Saskatchewan, and Strathmore since 2021.
British Columbia	Yes (since 1992)	Yes (since 2016)	Yes (since 2016)	Banned in Vancouver since 2018, prior to enactment of federal ban.
Manitoba	Yes (since 1987)	Yes (since 2012)	Yes (since 2025)	Banned provincially since 2015, prior to enactment of federal ban.
New Brunswick	Yes (since 1992)	Yes (since 2017)	Yes (since 2017)	No provincial legislation prior to enactment of federal ban
Newfoundland and Labrador	Yes (since 1995)	Yes (since 2013)	Yes (since 2013)	No provincial legislation prior to enactment of federal ban
Nova Scotia	Yes (since 1991)	Yes (since 2012)	Yes (since 2012)	Banned provincially since September 25, 2018, prior to enactment of federal ban.
Ontario	Yes (since 1986)	Yes (since 2012)	Yes (since 2012)	Banned provincially since 2015, prior to enactment of federal ban.
Prince Edward Island	Yes (since 1998)	Yes (since 2013)	Yes (since 2013)	Banned provincially since 2019, prior to enactment of federal ban
Quebec	Yes (since 1977)	Yes (since 2016)	Yes (since 2016)	Banned provincially since 2020, prior to enactment of federal ban
Saskatchewan	Yes (since 1993)	Yes (since 2014)	Not explicitly protected	Banned in two municipalities since 2021, prior to enactment of federal ban: Saskatoon and Regina
Northwest Territories	Yes (since 2002)	Yes (since 2002)	Yes (since 2019)	No territorial legislation prior to enactment of federal ban
Nunavut	Yes (since 1999)	Yes (since 2017)	Yes (since 2017)	No territorial legislation prior to enactment of federal ban
Yukon	Yes (since 1987)	Yes (since 2017)	Yes (since 2017)	Banned territorially since 2020, prior to enactment of federal ban

=== Activities where equality guaranteed ===
Accordingly, discrimination, including harassment, based on real or perceived sexual orientation, gender identity, or HIV/AIDS status is prohibited throughout Canada in private and public sector employment, housing, services provided to the public and publicity. All aspects of employment are covered, including benefits for spouses and long-term partners. Examples of services include credit, insurance, government programs, hotels and schools open to the public. Schools open to the public are liable for anti-gay name-calling and bullying by students or staff. LGBTQ Canadians have been allowed to serve in the military since the Douglas case was settled in 1992.

Prohibited discrimination occurs not only when someone is treated less favourably or is harassed based on a prohibited ground, but also when a uniform policy or practice has a perhaps unintended disproportionately adverse effect based on the ground. This is called "adverse effect discrimination". For example, it might in theory be discriminatory for schools open to the public to require parental consent for student participation in all school clubs, assuming that students are less likely to ask for or get permission to participate in gay–straight alliance clubs.

=== Exceptions ===
Human rights acts have no exceptions specifically for sexual orientation or gender identity, however, human rights acts typically include an exception for "bona fide requirements" or qualifications that applies to most grounds (e.g. sex, sexual orientation, disability), but only when the stringent requirements of the Meiorin Test are met.

Since human rights acts are quasi-constitutional laws, it is not possible for job applicants or unions, for example, to sign away equality rights. However, other laws may explicitly say that they apply notwithstanding a human rights act. Furthermore, some collective agreements include broad non-discrimination provisions that actually expand upon the rights listed in human rights acts.

=== Schools and other educational institutions ===
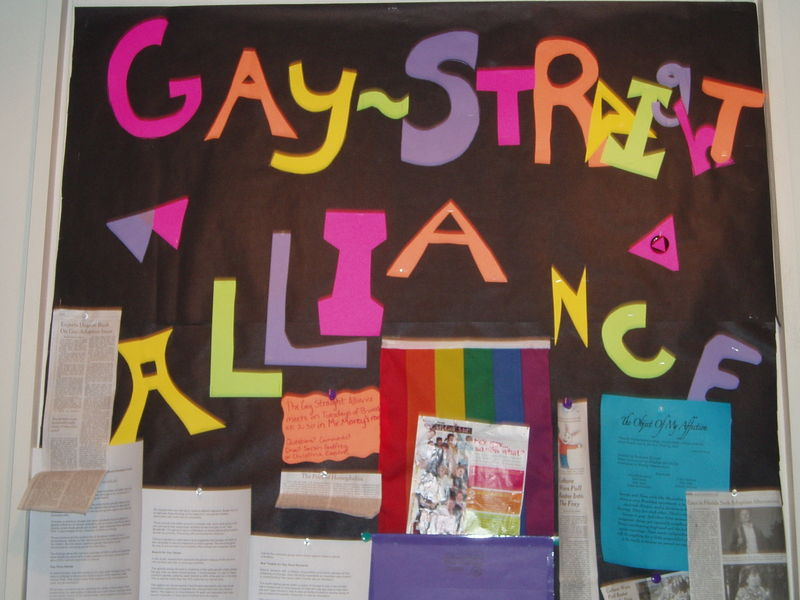
Some schools have gay–straight alliances or similar groups to counter homophobia and bullying and provide support for LGBT students in school.

The rights of LGBTQ students and staff in an educational institution vary considerably depending on whether the institution is religious and/or open to the public, since human rights acts only partially prohibit discrimination against pupils of private schools and the Charter only partly prohibits discrimination by churches, associations and businesses, while section 2 of the Charter protects freedom of religion and section 93 of the Constitution recognizes the right to denominational schools in some provinces.

The curriculum of public schools, particularly in British Columbia, are now being amended to incorporate LGBTQ topics. In reality, implementation of curriculum varies from school division to school division and often from teacher to teacher.

Religious educational institutions may in many cases discriminate based on sexual orientation against students and staff according to religious doctrine. Nevertheless, if they rent facilities to the general public on a commercial basis without regard to their religion, they may not refuse to rent them to LGBTQ groups. Controversially, the Canadian Supreme Court ruled in favour of denying accreditation to a religious university in 2018, due to its policies banning students who have had gay sex or sex outside of marriage.

However, most educational institutions, including privately owned schools open to the general public, are public services. They are subject to human rights acts and are strictly required to not discriminate against staff or students based on all the prohibited grounds, including sexual orientation, HIV/AIDS (and gender identity, see Grounds of prohibited discrimination above). They are strictly liable for harassment, name-calling and bullying of students and staff by staff on these grounds. In addition, as a result of the Jubran decision, they are liable for most such behaviour by students. They may be liable for anti-gay bullying even if the victim is not gay, nor believed to be (e.g. when a bully knowingly makes a false claim that a girl is a lesbian so that she will be ostracized or bullied by others or pressured to have sex with a boy to prove otherwise).

Furthermore, it may not be enough for schools to progressively discipline bullies when this is ineffective. Schools are responsible for providing an educational environment that is free from discriminatory harassment, and this may require them to provide "resources to adopt a broader, educative approach to deal with the difficult issues of harassment, homophobia and discrimination."

Public education governance bodies may place limits on the freedom of expression and the freedom of religion rights of teachers and school counsellors with respect to statements they may make regarding LGBTQ issues, both on and off the job. Teachers and school counsellors are considered to hold positions of trust and influence over young people and are required to ensure that their public statements do not impair public confidence in the school system or create an unwelcoming or intolerant school environment.

In 2012, Ontario passed the Accepting Schools Act, which was enacted after growing concern regarding bullying behaviours and several tragic suicides of bullied students. The legislation is intended to identify and prevent bullying, which includes LGBTQ students, and provide resources and support for educators and students as they deal with bullying incidents. Under the act, bullying is defined as repeated and aggressive behaviour by a pupil where, 1) the behaviour is intended by the pupil to cause, or the pupil ought to know that the behaviour would be likely to cause, harm, fear or distress to another individual, including psychological harm or harm to the individual's reputation and 2) the behaviour occurs in a context where there is a real or perceived power imbalance between the pupil and the individual based on factors such as size, strength, age, intelligence, peer group power, economic status, social status, religion, ethnic origin, sexual orientation, family circumstances, gender, race, disability or the receipt of special education. Quebec, Manitoba, New Brunswick, Nova Scotia, Alberta, Newfoundland and Labrador, the Northwest Territories and Yukon have also enacted similar anti-bullying laws. Other provinces, including British Columbia and Saskatchewan, have established policies and action plans regarding bullying in schools.

On June 18, 2020, the employees of the Canadian Museum for Human Rights revealed that its management would sometimes ask staff not to show any gay content on tours at the request of certain guests, including religious school groups.

== Hate speech and propaganda ==
=== Federal laws ===
The Criminal Code explicitly forbids communicating hate propaganda against members of identifiable groups, which includes members of the public distinguished by sexual orientation, gender identity, or gender expression. Members of identifiable groups are thus protected against hate speech and publications. In addition to the prohibition on hate publications, the Criminal Code also provides against defamatory libel. Everyone, including LGBTQ people, is protected against defamatory libels, especially through books, pamphlets, newspapers and the open Web, that are "likely to injure the reputation of any person by exposing him to hatred, contempt or ridicule, or that is designed to insult the person of or concerning whom it is published", either directly, by insinuation or irony, by words or otherwise. The Criminal Code also criminalises the act of advocating genocide, again against members of identifiable groups.

Hate speech is also prohibited by regulations passed under the Broadcasting Act. Where a station, network or undertaking is operated for radio purposes, television broadcasting or discretionary services, "a licensee shall not broadcast programming that contains ... any abusive comment or abusive pictorial representation that, when taken in context, tends to or is likely to expose an individual or a group or class of individuals to hatred or contempt on the basis of sexual orientation; any false or misleading news".

=== Provincial and territorial laws ===
There are also prohibitions on hate publications in three provinces and one territory. Alberta, British Columbia, Saskatchewan, and the Northwest Territories have enacted prohibitions on hate publications in their human rights legislation. Alberta's law prohibits hate publications based on gender, gender identity, gender expression, sex and sexual orientation. British Columbia prohibits hate publications based on sex, sexual orientation, gender identity or expression. Saskatchewan prohibits hate publications based on sex, sexual orientation or gender identity, while the Northwest Territories law prohibits hate publications based on sex, sexual orientation, gender identity or expression.

Since 1982, in regards to sex and sexual orientation, Quebec has had laws prohibiting anyone to distribute, publish or publicly exhibit a notice, symbol or sign involving discrimination, or authorize anyone to do so, where discrimination has been defined as a distinction, preference or exclusion having the effect of nullifying or impairing the right of a person, that is, on the basis of sex or sexual orientation, to full and equal recognition and exercise of his human rights and freedoms. Since 2016, the prohibition also applies in regards to gender identity and gender expression.

=== Supreme Court decisions ===
In R v Keegstra, the Supreme Court upheld the constitutionality of the criminal prohibition on hate propaganda, while in R v Lucas it upheld the offence of defamatory libel. The Supreme Court has upheld the prohibition on hate publications in human rights laws in two cases, Canada (Human Rights Commission) v. Taylor, and Saskatchewan Human Rights Commission v Whatcott.

== Conversion therapy ==
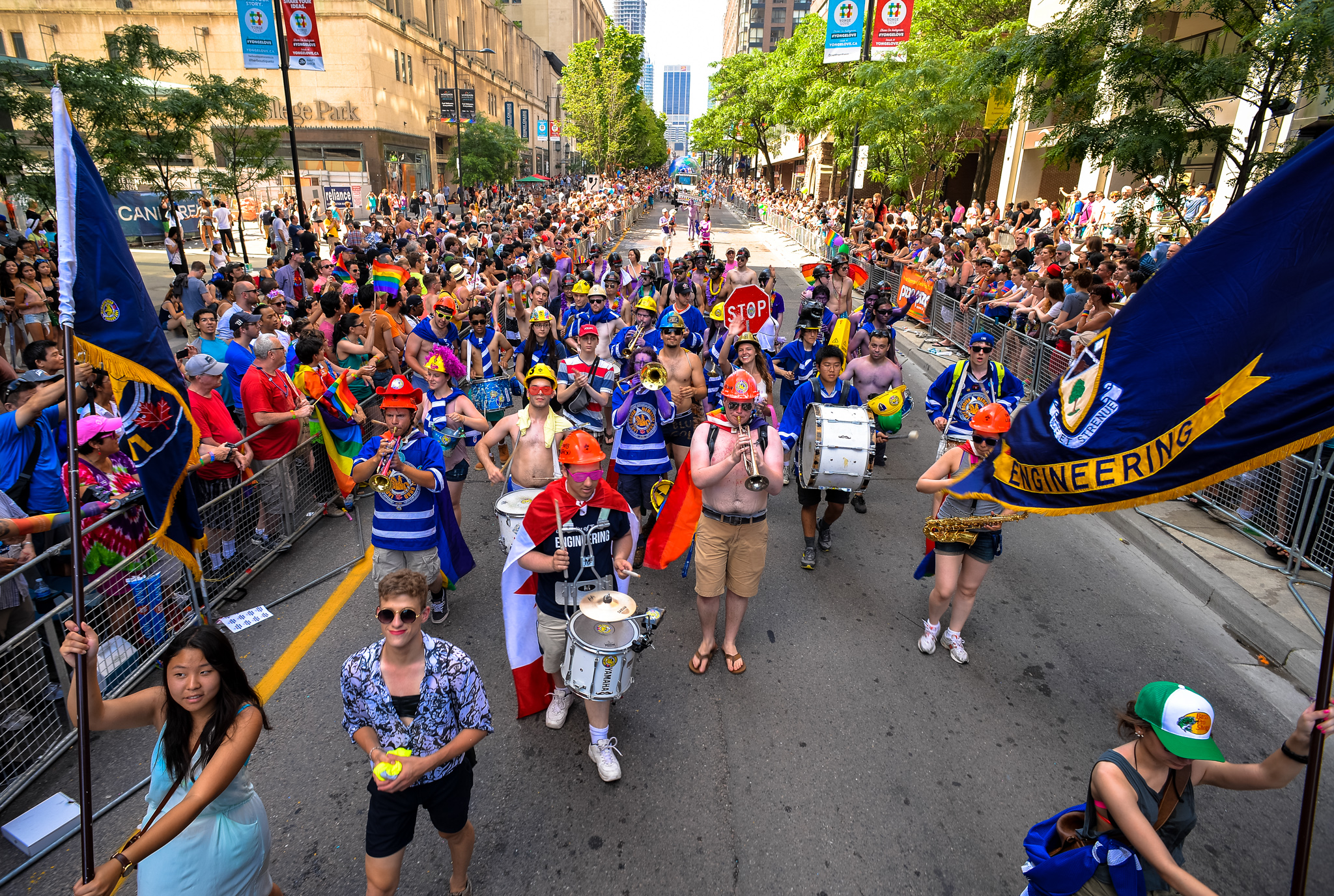
The 2014 edition of Pride Toronto

Conversion therapy, also known as reparative therapy, refers to widely debunked and abusive medical, spiritual and psychological practices that falsely claim to be able to change a person's sexual orientation or gender identity or gender expression. Such practices were rejected and condemned by every mainstream medical and mental health organization, including the Canadian Psychological Association, the Canadian Psychiatric Association and the Canadian Paediatric Society, citing potential harm and lack of efficacy.

The law has made it a crime to subject a person of any age, consenting or not, to such behaviour. Within the meaning of the Criminal Code, conversion therapy means any practice, treatment or service designed to change, repress or reduce a person's sexual orientation, gender identity, or gender expression, so that it conforms to heterosexuality or to the sex assigned to the person at birth. The law applies to anyone, regardless of any consideration. However, because the practice has come under increasing scrutiny, a practice Prime Minister Justin Trudeau has called 'despicable and degrading', providers frequently change their terminology to avoid detection. Some of those terms can seem relatively harmless at first glance. Examples include: Sexual Orientation Change Efforts (SOCE); Sexual Attraction Fluidity Exploration in Therapy (SAFE-T); Eliminating, reducing or decreasing frequency or intensity of unwanted Same-Sex Attraction (SSA); Reparative therapy; Sexual reorientation efforts; Ex-gay ministry; Promoting healthy sexuality; Addressing sexual addictions and disorders; Sexuality counseling; Encouraging relational and sexual wholeness; Healing sexual brokenness.

=== Federal law ===
Parliament passed An Act to amend the Criminal Code (conversion therapy) (initially referred to as Bill C-4), in December 2021. The House of Commons gave unanimous consent to a motion that the bill be deemed to have been referred to a Committee of the Whole, read and passed through at all stages, on December 1, 2021. The Senate followed on December 7, 2021. The bill received royal assent the following day on December 8, and came into force on January 7, 2022.

The Act imposes criminal penalties on anyone causing another person to undergo conversion therapy, removing a child from Canada to perform conversion therapy, advertising or promoting conversion therapy, and benefiting financially from conversion therapy. The Act includes both sexual orientation, gender identity, and gender expression in its definition of conversion therapy, and protects both adults and minors.

An earlier bill that would have banned conversion therapy (Bill C-6) had passed the House of Commons in June 2021, but did not pass the Senate before Parliament was dissolved ahead of the September 2021 election. Unlike C-4, the ban in C-6 would not have extended to adults.

=== Provincial and territorial laws ===
In 2012, the professional order for Quebec psychologists (l'Ordre des psychologues du Québec) reaffirmed "its position that homosexuality per se is not a mental disorder", and that it "opposes portrayals of sexual minority youths and adults as mentally ill due to their sexual orientation". Any complaints concerning aversive therapies, whether it be conducted by religious, professional or other practitioners, would be filed with either one of the professional orders and/or Quebec's Commission des droits de la personne et des droits de la jeunesse, under the harassment clause, section 10.1 of the Quebec Charter of Human Rights and Freedoms, or under the psychological ill-treatment clause, section 38 of the Youth Protection Act. "No ideological or other consideration, including one based on a concept of honour, can justify any situation described in section 38". In October 2020, the Quebec Government introduced a bill to ban conversion therapy. It was passed unanimously on 9 December 2020 and given Royal assent on 11 December 2020. The Act provides that any person having undergone such therapy, that is, through spiritual or non-spiritual practice, service or treatment, may obtain reparation for the resulting injury. In Quebec, an action for damages for bodily injury resulting from conversion therapy, cannot be prescribed anyway; such therapy, within the meaning of the Civil Code of Québec, constituting a criminal offence as violent behaviour suffered during childhood. As a result, conversion therapy was made punishable and remediable by law in Quebec on December 11, 2020. Victims of such criminal offences may also gain access to the financial assistance to which they are entitled, in order to help them recover and get on with their lives, through IVAC's mission (Indemnisation des victimes d'actes criminels), which allows for compensation for crime victims, such as counselling services. One may also go into free mediation and there's no time limit to report to the police or to file a complaint with a professional order. In civil lawsuits, the time limit starts running only when you realize that the harm you've experienced is due to the conversion therapy.

On May 22, 2015, Manitoba Health Minister Sharon Blady announced measures to stop conversion therapy in Manitoba. Blady said the province's Human Rights Code prohibits discrimination based on sexual orientation – including how health care services are provided. Blady also stated that "it is the position of the Manitoba Government that conversion therapy can have no place in the province's public health-care system."

In June 2015, the Affirming Sexual Orientation and Gender Identity Act (Bill 77) was made law in the province of Ontario. The act bans conversion therapy on minors and forbids it from being funded under the Ontario Health Insurance Plan public health care for anyone, of any age. The bill was introduced by Cheri DiNovo, a member of the Ontario New Democratic Party, and passed the Legislative Assembly with the support of all three major political parties.

On June 6, 2018, the Vancouver City Council unanimously voted to prohibit conversion therapy by businesses, regardless of age. The business licence bylaw applies to all licence holders, including religious groups.

Three bills (one each from the Nova Scotia Liberal Party, the Progressive Conservative Association of Nova Scotia and the Nova Scotia New Democratic Party) to ban the pseudoscientific and abusive practice were introduced in Nova Scotia. On September 25, 2018, the Nova Scotia House of Assembly passed the Sexual Orientation and Gender Identity Protection Act, the Liberal Party bill, with the unanimous support of all parties. The legislation received royal assent on 11 October and went into effect immediately. The act provides measures similar to Ontario's legislation, both in terms of prohibiting professionals from performing the therapy on minors, and prohibiting public funds from paying for the procedures for everyone regardless of age. However, Nova Scotia's age limit is set at 19 instead of 18, and its exception for competent consenting individuals has a minimum age limit of 16, whereas Ontario's act doesn't set any specific minimum limit with respect to competent consenting individuals. Nova Scotia's legislation also prohibits persons in a position of trust or authority (such as a religious leader) from making efforts aimed at changing the orientation or gender identity of a person under 19 years of age.

In November 2018, Prince Edward Island MLAs unanimously passed a motion expressing support for a conversion therapy ban. The non-binding motion was brought to the floor by Green Party MLA Peter Bevan-Baker. Health Minister Robert Mitchell argued to the best of his knowledge that conversion therapy is not practiced in the province. A queer rights advocate said he would like to see the province take the next step and introduce legislation. In November 2019, MLAs unanimously passed the Sexual Orientation and Gender Identity Protection in Health Care Act. The bill, as supported by the Progressive Conservative Party of Prince Edward Island, was a collaboration between Health Minister James Aylward and Opposition Leader Peter Bevan-Baker. The bill was granted royal assent on November 28 and went into effect immediately. The act is a combination of the legislation of Ontario and that of Nova Scotia, however, Prince Edward Island's legislation has used the age of 18 across the board whereas Nova Scotia's legislation uses the age of 16 for some aspects.

In March 2020, the Yukon Government introduced a bill to ban conversion therapy for minors. It was passed and given Royal Assent on 9 November 2020.

== Intersex rights ==
For Intersex Awareness Day in October 2018, Egale Canada published a statement calling on the Canadian Government to protect the rights of intersex persons, fulfilling "treaty body obligations under international law," and accompanied by a submission to the UN Committee Against Torture. The statement referred to Criminal Code [s. 268(3)], stating that it "allows for parents and medical practitioners to undertake nonconsensual, cosmetic surgeries on intersex infants". In May 2019, the Canadian Bar Association made a similar call.

Since 2017, besides male and female, Canadian passports have been available with an "X" sex descriptor. In June 2019, Canadian authorities announced that non-binary people may also apply to have an "X" gender marker.

Birth certificates in Canada are issued by provincial and territorial officials. As of 2019, Alberta, British Columbia, New Brunswick, Newfoundland and Labrador, the Northwest Territories, Nova Scotia, Ontario, and Yukon allow for a "third gender" option ("X"). Some provinces, namely Ontario and Saskatchewan, also offer citizens the option of not displaying the sex field at all.

In January 2021, rights pertaining to the designation of sex in the Quebec register of civil status—for transgender, non-binary and intersex people—were upheld as a result of a ruling by the Quebec Superior Court.

== Blood and tissue donation ==
There are no restrictions on blood donations specifically from men who have sex with men in Canada.

Canada previously had a three-month deferral period before men who have sex with men could donate blood since 2019. On April 28, 2022, Health Canada announced that it had accepted a request by Canadian Blood Services to change that policy and eliminate the three-month waiting period for gay and bi men, for donations of both blood and plasma. Instead, Canadian Blood services has implemented a new screening policy for all donors, regardless of sexuality or gender, to identify individuals who have engaged in high-risk sexual activities. Individuals who have anal sex with more than one person will still be required to undergo the three-month deferral period. The new policy took effect on September 11, 2022.

In Quebec, the blood donation service Héma-Québec announced that it would eliminated the waiting period in two steps, for plasma donations on October 2, 2022, and blood donations on December 4, 2022, following approval from Health Canada.

Both blood banks collaborate with and maintain close links to each other, complying with Health Canada safety standards.

Historically, the regulations under Canada's Food and Drug Act prohibited any man who had sex with another man since 1977 from donating semen. In February 2020, new regulations for semen donation were implemented that allow men who have sex with men to donate, but require them to abstain from same-sex sexual activity for the previous three months before donating. In April 2024, Health Canada announced the end of blanket restrictions on semen donations from men who have sex with men and would move to a behaviour-based screening model.

== Extraterritoriality of LGBTQ rights ==
The Criminal Code applies throughout Canada and creates penalty for offences committed outside Canada, including against LGBTQ rights, as if they were committed in Canada, especially on board of an aircraft or a ship, or on any means of transportation to or from the International Space Station. This includes any act, anywhere, that would constitute an indictable offence and a terrorist activity, as defined in the Code, for a political, religious or ideological purpose, objective or cause, against a segment of the public and a Canadian citizen.

Global Affairs Canada offers advice and information on safe LGBTQ travel abroad, and can provide consular assistance and support, discrimination-free, to Canadian citizens, should they be in trouble or need help abroad.

== LGBTQ issues in international politics ==
In 2008, Canada was part of the Joint statement on human rights, sexual orientation and gender identity delivered in the United Nations General Assembly, on behalf of 66 countries. Section 6 reads:

We condemn the human rights violations based on sexual orientation or gender identity wherever they occur, in particular the use of the death penalty on this ground, extrajudicial, summary or arbitrary executions, the practice of torture and other cruel, inhuman and degrading treatment or punishment, arbitrary arrest or detention and deprivation of economic, social and cultural rights, including the right to health.

Thereafter, in 2011, Canada was also part of a joint statement delivered to the United Nations Human Rights Council, on behalf of 85 countries, for "ending acts of violence and related human rights violations based on sexual orientation and gender identity". It recalled the 2008 Joint statement. Section 9 reads:

We recognise our broader responsibility to end human rights violations against all those who are marginalised and take this opportunity to renew our commitment to addressing discrimination in all its forms.

Since 2023, Global Affairs Canada website have been reading:

Canada stands up for the protection and promotion of the human rights of lesbian, gay, bisexual, transgender, queer, 2-spirit and intersex (LGBTQ2I) people globally. The human rights of all persons are universal and indivisible. Everyone should enjoy the same fundamental human rights, regardless of their sexual orientation and their gender identity and expression.

Canada also funds LGBTQ rights initiatives all over the world, including Ukraine, Costa Rica and Mauritius.

== LGBTQ influence in national politics ==
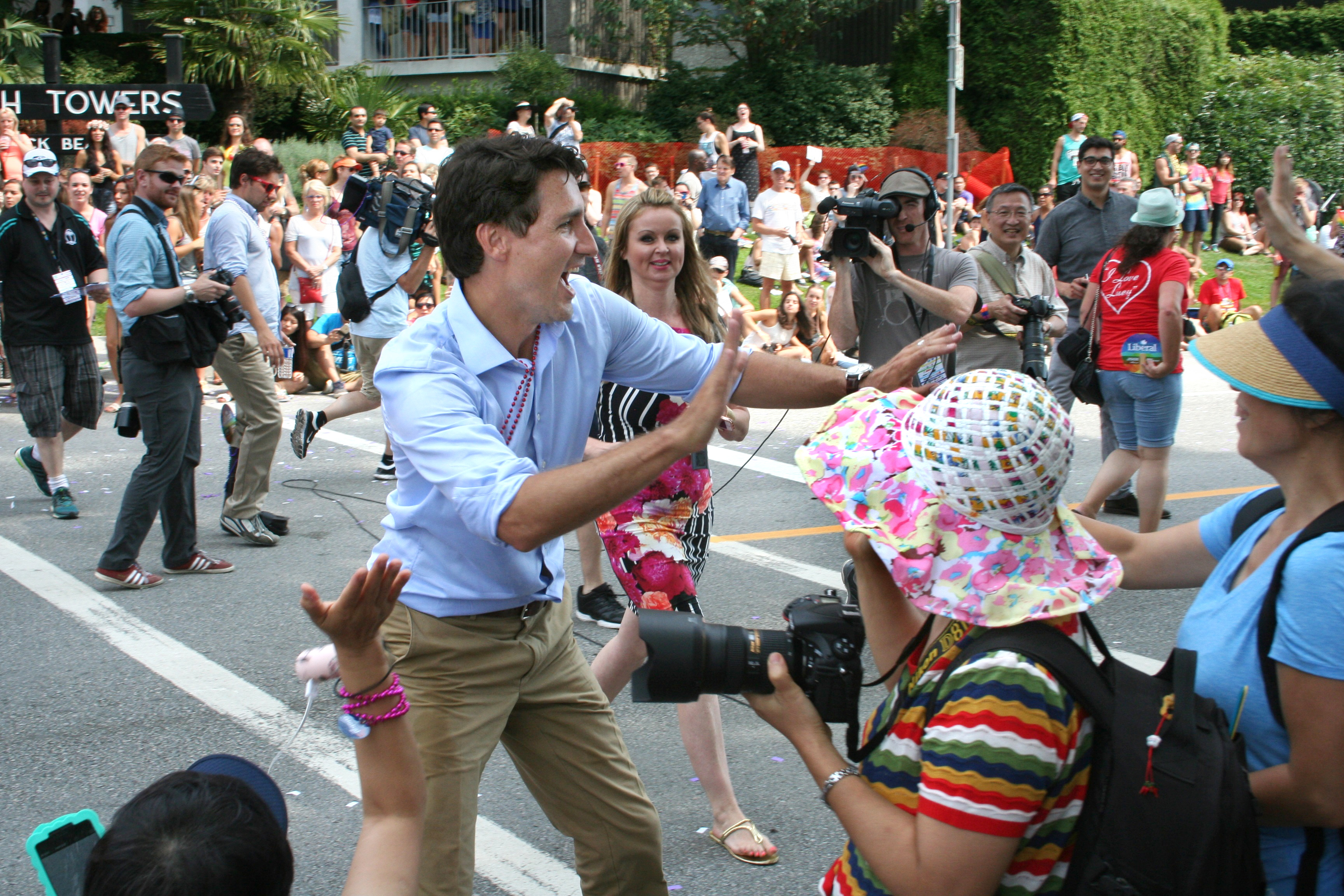
Justin Trudeau at the 2015 Vancouver Pride parade, shortly after launching his election campaign

In the House of Commons, four parties support LGBTQ rights with varying degrees. The New Democratic Party, Green Party, Bloc Québécois, and Liberal Party of Canada are the most vocal supporters of these rights. At its founding, the Conservative Party of Canada was largely opposed to LGBTQ rights, although some members, typically former members of the Progressive Conservative Party, have supported LGBTQ rights, including same-sex marriage. Former members of the Canadian Alliance (CA) have generally opposed expanded LGBTQ rights, and a former CA MP was rebuked for calls to re-criminalize homosexuality.

Since 2006, the Conservative Party has become a stronger advocate for LGBTQ rights in Canada and abroad. In May 2016, Conservative Party delegates voted in favour of removing the definition of marriage as a union between one man and one woman from the party's official policy document, effectively changing the party's official position on same-sex marriage from opposed to neutral.

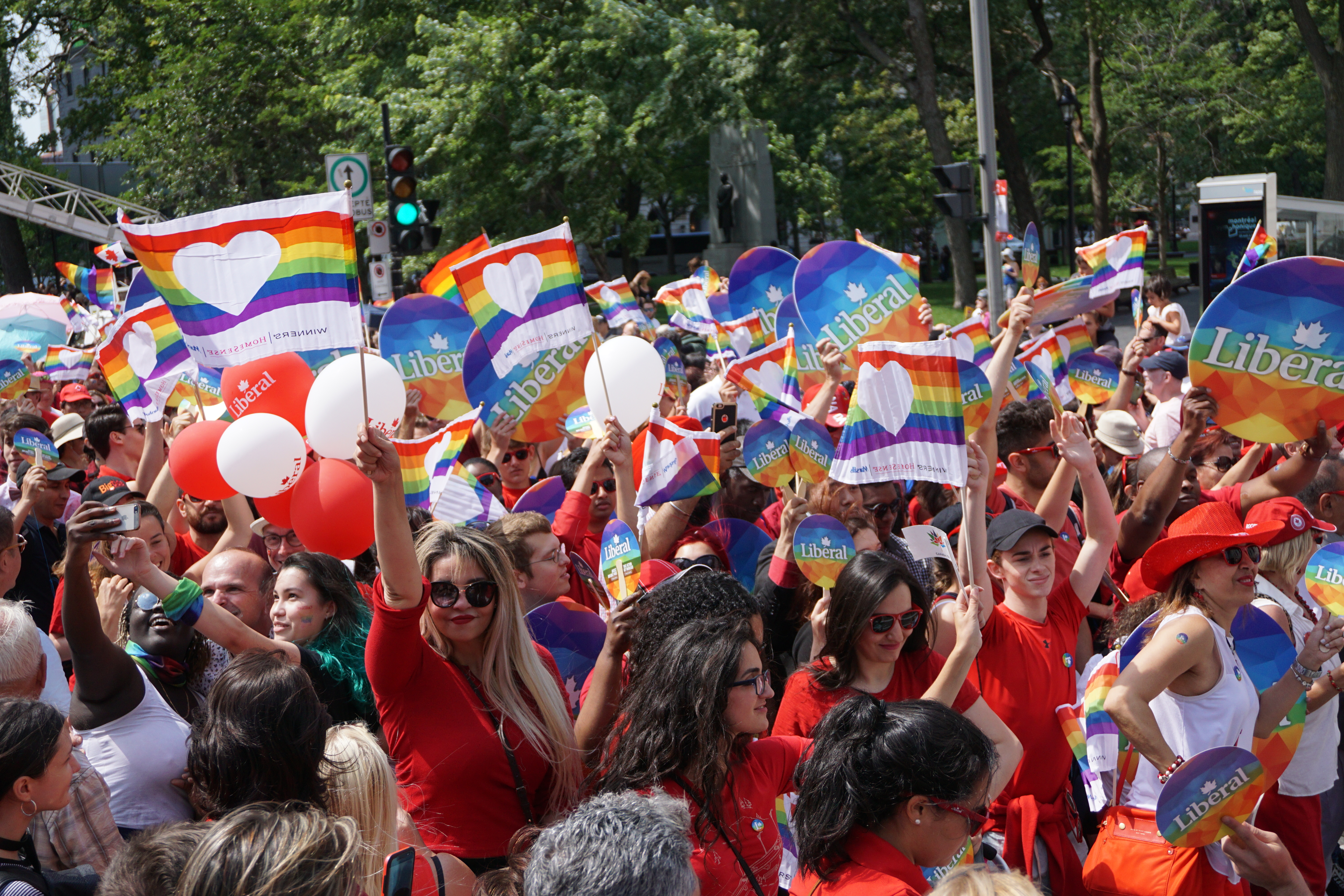
The Liberal Party at the Montreal Marche des Fiertés

Svend Robinson is notable for having been the first MP to come out as gay, in spring 1988. He has since been followed by other gay and lesbian politicians in Parliament: fellow New Democrats Libby Davies, Bill Siksay, Philip Toone, Craig Scott and Dany Morin; Bloc Québécois MPs Réal Ménard and Raymond Gravel; and Liberal Party of Canada MPs Scott Brison, Mario Silva and Rob Oliphant, as well as Senators Laurier LaPierre and Nancy Ruth.

As of 2019, there are four members of the House of Commons and two senators who openly identify as gay or lesbian.

Chris Lea, leader of the Green Party of Canada from 1990 to 1996, was the first openly gay political party leader in Canada. Svend Robinson became in 1995 the first openly gay candidate for the leadership of a political party with representation in the House of Commons, although he was not successful. André Boisclair, the former leader of the Parti Québécois, became the first openly gay leader of a party with parliamentary representation in North America; Allison Brewer, former leader of the New Brunswick New Democratic Party, was also elected leader as an out lesbian.

The following provinces have had openly gay provincial cabinet ministers: Ontario (Kathleen Wynne, George Smitherman, Glen Murray), British Columbia (Tim Stevenson, Lorne Mayencourt, Ted Nebbeling, Spencer Chandra Herbert), and Manitoba (Jim Rondeau, Jennifer Howard). On January 26, 2013, Kathleen Wynne became the leader of the Liberal party of Ontario and premier of that province (the largest of the country's thirteen provinces and territories, with approximately 39% of the country's population). Following the Ontario provincial election in 2014, Kathleen Wynne became the first openly gay leader to be elected with a majority mandate in all the commonwealth jurisdictions.

ProudPolitics, a cross-partisan organization dedicated to providing networking and fundraising assistance to LGBTQ politicians and candidates inspired by the American Gay & Lesbian Victory Fund, was established in Toronto in 2013.

On November 15, 2016, Randy Boissonnault, Liberal MP for Edmonton Centre, was named Special Advisor on LGBTQ2 issues to the Prime Minister. The role involves advising the Prime Minister "on the development and co-ordination of the Government of Canada's LGBTQ2 agenda" including protecting LGBTQ rights in Canada and addressing both present and historical discrimination.

On April 23, 2019, the Royal Canadian Mint launched a new dollar coin symbolizing equality with 3 million loonies placed into circulation to commemorate 50 years since the decriminalisation of homosexuality in Canada.

In August 2019, Ottawa Mayor Jim Watson came out as gay in an op-ed to the Ottawa Citizen.

Canada is a founding donor to the Equality Fund, which supports more than 650 women's rights and feminist organizations across 90 countries, and co-chairs the Alliance for Feminist Movements, through which hundreds of governments, civil society and philanthropic organizations, and women's funds collaborate on issues like funding, resources and building political support.

== Canada Pride Citation ==
The Canada Pride Citation Insignia of Honour and Badge

In 2018, Canadian Member of Parliament Randy Boissonnault unveiled the Canada Pride Citation, a badge designed by the Canadian Heraldic Authority to be worn by LGBTQ members of the Canadian Armed Forces as a form of reparation for injustices historically committed against the community.

On the subject of the Citation, General Jonathan Vance said:

For many years, LGBTQ2 Canadians committed to serving Canada by wearing the uniform of the Canadian Armed Forces despite knowing they could be persecuted for just being themselves. That took courage, and as an institution, we didn't recognize it and we didn't defend them. The Canada Pride Citation, which can be worn proudly on our uniform, is as an enduring symbol of our acknowledgement of past injustices and our commitment to ensure that this dark chapter in our history never happens again.

Jody Thomas, Deputy Minister of National Defense, noted:

With the Canada Pride Citation, we are acknowledging the historic unjust treatment of LGBTQ2 people, and the harm that it did. And we are recognizing the incredible depth of the commitment LGBTQ2 people showed to serving Canada, despite systemic discrimination. This citation is a symbol of our ongoing responsibility and determination to address barriers and make sure everyone feels safe and welcome being their whole selves.

== Summary table ==
Same-sex sexual activity legal	Yes (Since 1969)
Equal age of consent (16)	Yes (Since 2019)
Anti-discrimination laws in employment for sexual orientation	Yes (Federally since 1996)
Anti-discrimination laws in the provision of goods and services for sexual orientation	Yes (Federally since 1996)
Anti-discrimination laws in all other areas for sexual orientation (incl. indirect discrimination)	Yes (Federally since 1996)
Anti-discrimination laws covering gender identity or expression in all areas	Yes (Federally since 2017)
Anti-discrimination laws in housing, health insurance, banking and all other financial institutions, labour, facilities and public accommodations	Yes
Prohibitions on hate speech	Yes (Federally since 2004)
Hate crime laws include sexual orientation, gender identity and expression	Yes (Became law on June 19, 2017)
Same-sex civil unions	Yes / No (In Quebec only regardless of gender idenity)
Same-sex marriage	Yes (Since 2005, nationwide)
Recognition of same-sex couples	Yes (Varies with jurisdiction)
Stepchild and joint adoptions by same-sex couples	Yes
Adoption by a single LGBTQ person	Yes
International adoption by individuals regardless of marital status, sexual orientation and gender identity	Yes (Canada allows single individuals and LGBTQ individuals to adopt. However, many LGBTQ individuals and parents face bigotry from countries that do not want single individuals or LGBTQ individuals to adopt, instead they favor a family structure that includes a mother and a father.)
Paid family leave for same-sex parents and couples	Yes (Since 2018)
Automatic parenthood on birth certificates for children of same-sex couples	Yes
LGBTQ people allowed to serve openly in the military	Yes (Since 1992; see Sexual orientation and the Canadian military)
LGBTQ individuals allowed to serve openly in government including law enforcement	Yes
Conjugal visits for same-sex couples	Yes (Eligible visitors, who may not themselves be prison inmates, are: spouse or common-law partner of at least six months)
Right to change legal gender	Yes (Since 2017, none of the thirteen provinces and territories of Canada require sex reassignment surgery for changes to sex markers on government forms. More precise regulations vary by province and territory, respectively.)
Gender self-identification	Yes / No (Varies by Province/Territory)
Legal access to single gender-neutral bathrooms	Yes / No (Not in Nunavut)
Coverage for sex reassignment surgery	Yes (Since 2022, nationwide)
Transgender people allowed to participate in the sport of their gender identity and use restrooms and other gender-segregated spaces that correspond to their gender identity	Yes / No (Not in Alberta)
Gender confirmation surgery, puberty blockers, hormone replacement therapy and other transition-related healthcare for transgender people required to be covered under health insurance and provincial Medicare policies	Yes
LGBTQ education	Yes
Third gender option	Yes (Federally since 2017)
Anti-bullying legislation in schools and colleges	Yes / No (Not in Prince Edward Island, Nunavut and Saskatchewan)
Intersex minors protected from invasive surgical procedures	No (The Criminal Code [s. 268(3)] allows for parents and medical practitioners to undertake nonconsensual, cosmetic surgeries on intersex infants.)
Intersex individuals protected from discrimination on the basis of sex characteristics	No
Legal recognition of non-binary gender	Yes (The recognition of non-binary people by provincial governments varies across Canada. All provinces and territories have removed requirements for surgery, but many still do rely on a medical model of transness.)
Legal recognition of non-binary gender on Canadian passports	Yes (Since 2019)
Homosexuality declassified as an illness	Yes (Since 1973)
Transgender identity declassified as an illness	Yes
Transvestism declassified as an illness	Yes (Since 2014)
Conversion therapy banned	Yes (Federally since 2022)
Gay and trans panic defences banned in court	No
Allowing trans women in homeless shelters for women, to serve time in women's prisons and in women's changing rooms	Yes (Transgender women are allowed to serve time in federal women's prisons since December 27, 2017.)
Access to IVF/Artificial insemenation for lesbians	Yes
Equal access to surrogacy for all couples	Yes (Since 2004, the Assisted Human Reproduction Act has prohibited commercial surrogacy for all couples regardless of sexual orientation. However, altruistic surrogacy is permitted and surrogate mothers may be reimbursed for some expenses. Quebec law allows neither altruistic nor commercial surrogacy, but doesn't explicitly forbid it, and Quebec has reimbursed gay men for surrogacy costs.)
Gay and bisexual males reimbursed for surrogacy costs	No
Sexual orientation and gender identity allowed as grounds for asylum	Yes
Canadian census counts number of lesbian, gay, bisexual, and transgender people and recognizes a non-binary gender or Intersex option	Yes
LGBTQ anti-discrimination law in prisons, juvenile halls, and immigration detention centers, including but not limited to transgender people required to be housed according to their gender identity and coverage of transition care	Yes (Since 2017, transgender individuals can be housed in federal prisons according to their gender identity.)
Gay criminal records expunged	Yes (Since 2018)
Apology to LGBTQ people	Yes (Apology issued on November 28, 2017)
Employment Equity Act include reference to sexual orientation, sex characteristics, gender, gender identity and gender expression	No
Individuals allowed to run for and hold political office regardless of their sexual orientation, sex characteristics, gender and gender identity	Yes
Pride Month celebrated/recognized	Yes (Since 2016, the entire month of June has been declared pride month)
Transgender Day of Remembrance observed	Yes (November 20)
LGBTQ history month observed	Yes (October)
Memorial honoring LGBTQ service members and veterans	Yes (Under construction)
Gender "X" be placed on death certificates	Yes (Since 2019)
Gay and bisexual males allowed to donate semen	Yes (Since 2024)
Gay and bisexual males allowed to donate organs and stem cells	Yes (Since 2022)
MSMs and female sex partners of MSMs allowed to donate blood and plasma	Yes (Since 2022, nationwide; excluding those who have had both new or multiple partners and anal sex with any partner in the previous three months)

== LGBTQ rights on Indian reserves ==
=== Effects of colonialism ===
Since the 17th century, European and Christian ideals have been imposed upon Indigenous communities; it has played a large role in the erasure of multi-gender systems in these communities. Early missionaries were dismissive of multi-gender identities and forced their own ideals through assimilation.

=== Two-Spirit Movements ===
In the 1980s, the Two-Spirit movement sought to define itself as distinct from the larger LGBTQ movement. Indigenous-Queer people faced challenges attached to racism and colonialism through the residential school system and The Indian Act. Two-Spirited activists fought for the Two-Spirited community in a way that would not isolate them from their culture. Albert McLeod is one of the prominent activists in the Two-Spirit movement. McLeod created a range of services to help Indigenous people during the AIDS crisis. He recognized the need for services such as information on safe sex practices in Indigenous languages and culturally specific health campaigns.

=== Service Access ===
There is a disproportionate negative effect on Indigenous people living on reserve when it comes to things like access to healthcare, especially for Queer Indigenous peoples. Albert McLeod and others have been researchers and activists for better healthcare service for Indigenous communities. McLeod's work specifically has cited issues such as a lack of informational awareness and training for healthcare staff working with Indigenous and Queer Indigenous people as well as a general lack of healthcare access as a result of an urban-rural divide. McLeod also notes a 3.5 times higher incidence of HIV/AIDS among Canadian Indigenous communities when contrasted with other ethnic groups.

== See also ==
- Canadian Lesbian and Gay Archives
- Canadian values
- Egale Canada
- Age of consent
- Age-of-consent reform in Canada
- Fruit machine (homosexuality test)
- Transgender rights in Canada
- Human rights in Canada
- LGBT policy in the Canadian military
- LGBTQ rights in the Commonwealth of Nations
- LGBTQ rights in La Francophonie
- LGBTQ rights in the Americas
