= Peaches Latour =

- Other name: Paul Fournier
- Occupations: Drag queen, activist, hairdresser
- Years active: 1950s-1995

Paul Fournier (born 1940/1941), also known by the stage name Peaches Latour, is a Canadian drag queen, activist, and hairdresser who had a drag career in the National Capital Region for over fifty years. Referred to as "Ottawa's most famous gay celebrity" in the 1960s and 1970s and as "Ottawa's first drag queen" Fournier is known for his involvement in the Government of Canada's anti-gay purges of the military and public service from the 1950s to the 1990s.

== Early life and career ==
Paul Fournier was born and raised in Buckingham, Quebec (presently Gatineau), and moved to Ottawa at 16 to train as a hairdresser. He was openly gay. He began performing in drag as Peaches Latour in the early 1960s, getting her start with help from Montreal drag queen Zaza L'Amour. She performed in venues across Ottawa and Gatineau, becoming a mainstay of the Ottawa-Hull drag scene.

In 1969 Fournier was arrested by the Royal Canadian Mounted Police as part of the federal government's Anti-gay purges, in which the military and public service in Canada were investigated by the RCMP for homosexuality, which was determined to be a character defect and a threat to national security. Fournier was show photo albums with pictures of Canadian public servants and military members from Ottawa believed to be homosexual and asked to give their names. While he recognized many faces from the albums he refused to name names, and was labelled a traitor to his country by the RCMP.

Fournier retired from hairdressing and as Peaches Latour in 1995. In 2022 Peaches Latour was interviewed on the radio show WIGY The Greatest Hits: The Breakfast Club.

== Honours and legacy ==
Paul Fournier has been featured in multiple documentaries and publications for his role as an LGBTQ rights activist. His personal documents and photos relating to his career as Peaches Latour are included as a fond in the City of Ottawa Archives.

In 2009 his story was described in Gary Kinsman's and Patrizia Gentile's book The Canadian War on Queers: National Security as Sexual Regulation.

In 2017 Fournier was included in the exhibit "The Village Legacy Project" and was included on the project's website. As Peaches Latour he was included in the Village Legacy Project's Community Heroes Portrait Gallery.

In 2018 Fournier was interviewed for Sarah Fodey's documentary The Fruit Machine about his arrest and involvement in the anti-gay purges.

In 2024 he was given the Order of Ottawa following nomination by Ottawa city councilor for Rideau-Vanier Stéphanie Plante, being described as a "legend" and having a significant role in Ottawa's queer history.

In 2026 Fournier and Canadian activist and reporter Philip Hannan were prominently featured in the archival exhibit Drag the Archives at the City of Ottawa Archives. The exhibit was developed by the City of Ottawa Equity Team, the City of Ottawa Archives, and students from Carleton University. The exhibition will run from April to December 2026 at Gallery 112 in the James K. Bartleman Centre.
