= Fruit machine (disambiguation) =

Fruit machine is a British term for a gambling machine that creates a game of chance.

Fruit machine may also refer to:

- An analog computer used with the Chain Home radar system during World War II
- Fruit machine (homosexuality test), a device developed in Canada that could purportedly identify homosexual people
- "Fruit Machine" (song), a 2007 single by the Ting Tings
- The Fruit Machine, a theatrical play by Brian Drader
- The Fruit Machine (1988 film), a 1988 British film thriller released as Wonderland in the US
- The Fruit Machine (2018 film), a Canadian documentary film directed by Sarah Fodey
- A vending machine that sells fruit
