= Sexual orientation and the Canadian military =

Canadian military policy with respect to LGBT sexuality has changed in the course of the 20th century from being intolerant and repressive to accepting and supportive.

== CFAO 19-20 ==
In May 1967, due to the passing of the CF Reorganization Act (C-90) the Canadian Forces issued Canadian Forces Administrative Order (CFAO) 19-20, Sexual Deviation - Investigation, Medical Investigation and Disposal, which required members of the military suspected of being homosexual to be investigated and then subsequently released. These investigations carried out by the Special Investigation Unit made use of the fruit machine, a device created by Dr. Frank Robert Wake of Carleton University in the 1960s. This device was created with the objective of identifying perceived and actual homosexuals in the Canadian military in order to protect the organization from blackmail by Soviet Union spies. Based on the results of the fruit machine evaluation, members of the CF were removed, having their careers ruined, their privacy invaded, and their lives destroyed.

Within the Military Police (MP), a Special Investigation Unit (SIU), based in Halifax, was in charge of purging gay people from the Armed Forces. For the MPs, to chase homosexuals was an obsession in the name of National Security during the Cold War against the Soviet Union.

The procedure against a “gay suspect” started with the local MPs making a complete search of his quarters on the Base or apartment in town—without a warrant. Meanwhile the SIU interrogated the suspect’s co-workers, and anyone who knew him in his hometown, college, or university; asking direct and embarrassing questions.

The gay suspect was then summoned by the SIU for interrogation. The purpose was to obtain a confession of being gay, and, no less important, to name other gay people in the Services. The sessions could last several hours, using various tactics such as insults, comments, and threats of a court-martial, jail term, forced labor (for the Navy), or a dishonorable discharge. The right of an advocate was ignored, while fabricated proofs and false testimonies were common. Questions were asked about private sexual practices. Suspects were offered the possibility of quietly leaving the Service if they cooperated. Most of the time, the gay suspect cooperated to avoid further public embarrassment. But following his written confession, the “suspect“ became ipso facto “accused” of being gay, and therefore received “rapidly” (CFAO, art. 7) a dishonorable discharge from the Armed Forces, which is “almost as bad as a criminal record”. Before leaving, the accused gay military member was given a two-week psychiatric counselling to cure his “abnormal illness”.

If the gay suspect refused to “cooperate“, there was nothing the SIU could do; in most cases, they had no proof outside of rumors, hearsay or lists of names. However, a letter stating that the military member is “suspected” of homosexuality was sent to his Base Commander with a copy in the suspect’s file which would follow him from Base to Base throughout his career. Additionally his security clearance was also reduced from Top secret to Secret, or even to Confidential only.

While this “gay purge” in the Armed Forces was conducted in the name of National Security, during the entire period (1950-1992), not a single gay military was suspected or accused of treason. Nevertheless, it is estimated that 9,000 military members have been discharged from the three Services for being gay or lesbian. The number of RCMP agents also released for the same reasons is unknown.

In the Civil Service, the Memorandum on Sexual Deviation (1967), read in the Commons by Prime Minister Pearson, is applied, but with greater tolerance by the Deputy Minister of the Department who assets each case. Not as many gay employees have been terminated—even at the Dept of External Affairs which had quite a few but discreet gay diplomats. When a “suspected gay” was considered for an embassy posting, he was submitted to another security screening, and his phone was bugged for one week. At the medical exam, the physician would ask politely if he could examine the anus. Finally, the “gay suspect” is sent to a psychiatrist to determine if his “character weakness” is a security risk for an overseas posting.

== Effect of social liberalization ==
In 1992, 2Lt Michelle Douglas sued the Canadian Armed Forces for discrimination. In October 1992, just before Douglas' legal challenge went to trial, the Canadian military abandoned its policy banning gays and lesbians and settled the case. Order CFAO-19-20 was repealed, thereby allowing gay, lesbian, bisexual and transgender (LGBT) people to serve in the Canadian Armed Forces. While this marked the official end of what was known as the LGBT Purge, 2SLGBTQI+ service members and public servants faced overt discrimination throughout the 1990s.

A series of provincial and territorial court decisions beginning in 2003 ruled in favour of the legality of gay marriage, and a national law to that effect was passed by Canada's parliament in 2005 by the Paul Martin Liberal government.

== Reconciliation ==
In 2018, the Ross, Roy Satalic vs Canada class action lawsuit was settled. This followed the apology in the House of Commons by Prime Minister Justin Trudeau and leaders of each party on 28 November 2017. The settlement provided compensation to individuals who faced discrimination in the Canadian Armed Forces as well as other civil service members. The settlement also established a multi million dollar fund, the LGBT Purge Fund, to complete a number of reconciliation and memorialization measures, including the Canada Pride Citation.

== Openly Gay Members ==
Davin Hoekstra was the first to come out nationally as a gay soldier in the Spring 1998 edition of Fab National Magazine. His interview with award-winning journalist Michael Rowe garnered global attention. Davin was subsequently interviewed by Kathleen Petty on CBC Newsworld, Arlene Bynon on Global and his story appeared in newspapers across the country.

== Same-sex unions in the military ==
In 2004, Jason Stewart was the first member of Canada's military to marry a same-sex partner. In May 2005, Canada's first military gay wedding took place at Nova Scotia's Canadian Forces Base Greenwood. Officials described the ceremony as low-key but touching. A similar wedding has since taken place between two male Royal Canadian Mounted Police officers. Today, the Canadian Forces recognizes same-sex marital and common-law unions, and affords them the same benefits offered to all married or common-law serving members.

== Participation in Pride parades ==
During the Divers-Cité Pride parades 1999–2002 in Montreal, a military member and an ex-military member held the banner of the informal grouping MGL, dissolved in 2004 due to the lack of participation of the military community LGBT. During the 2006 Halifax Pride parade, one member of the Canadian Forces marched in the parade, helping to carry the large pride flag. In the 2008 Toronto Pride parade, ten members of the Canadian Forces marched for the first time as a group. One month later, twelve gay and straight members of the Canadian Forces marched in the Vancouver Pride Parade. Lt(N) Steven Churm said, "The message to the public is that the Canadian Forces is an employer of choice."[6] For Moncton River of Pride in 2010 Ruben Avila, a former Infantry officer candidate, was noted saying that it was "a social milestone, for both the gay and lesbian communities, as well as the armed forces". A Facebook group exists where CF LGBT members network and organise as a support group, do socials, as well as plan for various Canadian Pride events dating back to his initial collaboration with Lt (N) Churm at Toronto Pride 2009. In 2015, the Canadian Armed Forces were in the Edmonton Pride Parade with a LAV, Bison, and MRT.
