= Civil unions in Quebec =

Civil unions in Quebec are available in Quebec to both opposite-sex and same-sex couples, which attempts to create the same rights for the partners as a traditional marriage.

As a result of a range of activism and to the M. v. H. decision, the National Assembly of Quebec voted unanimously in 2002 to amend the Civil Code of Quebec to create a status of civil union in Quebec, available to both opposite-sex and same-sex couples and largely having the same rights as marriage. The law was enacted on June 24, 2002.

A civil union is contracted into by same-sex or opposite-sex partners 18 years of age and older, who are not otherwise married, not in another civil union, or who are not closely related, following prescribed formalities similar to the regime of marriage. The civil union carries obligations and benefits equivalent to that of marriage including the obligation of support (CCQ art. 585) and the establishment of a family patrimony and family residence (CCQ art. 521.6) and may otherwise be modified by a contract (CCQ 521.8) similar to a pre-nuptial agreement and may agree to a particular property regime similar to available matrimonial regimes. It creates a family connection between the spouses and their relatives (CCQ art. 521.7).

Judicial conciliation is merited "when the spouses cannot agree on their rights and performance of their duties" (CCQ art. 521.9). Such union may be annulled within three years if irregularly contracted (CCQ arts. 521.10-521.11). A civil union ends at death of one of the partners or may be dissolved by judicial dissolution or by a 'transaction agreement' and 'joint declaration' before a civil law notary and recorded en minute if both partners consent and they settle all the consequences of the dissolution (CCQ arts. 521.13-521.16).

Judicial dissolution is merited when "the interests of the common children of the spouses are at stake" or where the parties cannot otherwise agree (CCQ art. 521.17 para. 1). Provisional orders of support, custody and access may be entered during the pendency of the dissolution action (CCQ art. 521.71 para. 2) and the court may, upon or after pronouncing dissolution decide maintenance, custody and education issues in the best interests of and with due regard to the rights of the children (CCQ art. 521.17, para. 3).

The act establishing the regime of civil union also modified rules creating filiation for biological children of one of the partners, and for adopted children as well as the recognition of parental authority and child support obligations so they will apply to civil union couples as well as married couples.

In March 2004, Quebec same-sex couples won the right to marry. Today, couples (both opposite- and same-sex) can choose between civil marriage and civil unions.

== See also ==
- LGBT rights in Canada
