= Peter and Murray Corren =

- Peter and Murray Corren on their wedding day
- Known for: Canadian LGBT-rights activists

Peter Corren (born Cook; died 30 December 2009) and Murray Corren (born Warren) – Corren is a combination of their former names – are LGBT-rights activists from Vancouver, British Columbia whose complaint before British Columbia's Human Rights Tribunal led to an agreement whereby the provincial Ministry of Education would consult them on how gays are presented in the school curriculum. Peter Corren died of cancer on 30 December 2009.

== Background ==
The Correns, a same-sex couple with one adopted son, are long-time activists for gay rights who have been involved in several high-profile cases. They were among the first gay couples to foster and adopt children in Canada. In the late 1990s, Murray Warren, a Coquitlam schoolteacher, was one of the petitioners in Chamberlain v. Surrey School District, a case that dealt with the Surrey School Board's refusal to approve as learning resources several children's books featuring same-sex parents.

They also were petitioners in an early same-sex marriage case that lifted the ban on same-sex marriage in British Columbia.

They were one of the first same-sex couples to marry in Canada.

== Human rights complaint ==
In 1997, Cook and Warren complained to the BC Human Rights Tribunal that public schools in British Columbia discriminated against gays by failing to include information about them in curricula, and that the lack of such representation amounted to systemic discrimination. The Tribunal accepted their case, but as the hearing approached in 2006, the provincial government negotiated a settlement with the Correns by which the province committed itself to review the inclusivity of school curricula and would introduce a new elective course on social justice that would include sexual orientation, race, ethnicity and gender issues. The agreement stipulated that the Correns would be consulted about the section of the new course on sexual orientation and more broadly about the presentation of gays in the broader school curriculum. It also stipulates that the government must solicit feedback directly from organization or groups, identified by the Correns, "with expertise in sexual orientation, homophobia, and other issues of inclusion and diversity in the curriculum". Under the agreement, these organizations are allowed guaranteed input into the revision of any curriculum for any grade, which "they consider should be given priority in light of sexual orientation issues". One controversial feature of the agreement is that the provision of "Alternative Delivery", which allows parents to opt their children out of parts of the curriculum, will be limited to specific courses.

== Reactions ==
As in many cases involving the education system and LGBT issues, the potential for conflict between the human rights of LGBT people and the religious freedom rights of parents, both of which are protected under the Canadian Charter of Rights and Freedoms, has created significant controversy. Both religious media and mainstream newspaper editorials (most notably the National Post) have raised concerns about appointing the activists to revise the curricula.

The British Columbia School Act, which governs the public school system in the province, states that public schools "must be conducted on entirely secular and non-sectarian grounds". While faith-based schools nominally have the freedom to teach according to their own religious beliefs, they are required by law to teach the same curriculum as the public system, and thus would be affected by any substantial curriculum changes resulting from the Corren agreement. To date, the government has not stated whether religious schools will be required to teach a curriculum if it conflicts with religious beliefs.

Writing in the British Columbia Catholic, Vancouver Archbishop Raymond Roussin, SM, said of the deal: "This would be clearly contrary to the fundamental and non-negotiable right of parents to raise their family and educate their children. The right of parents to determine how their children receive instruction on matters of faith and morals must be the primary consideration" (4 September 2006). His comments were condemned the following day by Peter Corren as a "homophobic diatribe against Canadian society". (CCRL Press Release, 7 September 2006)

The Corren Agreement has resulted in the curriculum (IRP) for the agreed course on social justice, Social Justice 12, an elective course, being published. The agreement has also begun to affect the rest of the curriculum, in part through influencing the revision of course curricula as they come up for revision, and in part through a teachers' guide, Making Space. (See links to the various sections in "Curriculum Support Materials" This guide potentially could influence the teaching of all courses. (See "Background and Rationale")

== Board of Education of School District No. 34 (Abbotsford) v. Corren ==
Controversy erupted in 2008 when one school district, Abbotsford, where the conservative school board didn't approve the course. This produced protest from some students and from the Correns and their supporters. The Abbotsford district also tried to force parental consent for students to take the course. In response to this the Correns sued the Abbotsford school board to adapt the course and to drop the parental consent requirement in the Board of Education of School District No. 34 (Abbotsford) v. Corren. While the case was being processed the Abbotsford school board allowed the course in its schools for the 2009/2010 school year so the Correns amended their case to focus on dropping the parental consent.

== See also ==
- Gay rights in Canada

== Links and Bibliography ==
- Settlement agreement (pdf)
- The Corren Foundation Page

== Bibliography ==
Notes

References

- Bailey, Sue (19 May 2003). "Same-sex marriage divides Canadians; there are equally passionate views of both sides". The London Free Press.
- CBC News (31 December 2009). "Gay rights trailblazer dies". CBC News.
- Chung, Andrew (2 May 2003). "B.C. appeal court lifts ban on gay unions". Toronto Star.
- Davidson, Chris (July 2010). "Is it Discriminatory to Require Parental Consent for Students to Take a Course Dealing with Sexuality and Gender Identity?". Education Law Journal. 20 (1): 73–77.
- Supreme Court of British Columbia (1 April 2011). "Board of Education of School District No. 34 (Abbotsford) v. Corren 2011 BCSC 529". bcjustice.net.
