= LGBTQ2+ National Monument =

Planned public monument in Ottawa, Ontario, Canada

Coordinates: 45.4197°N 75.7100°W

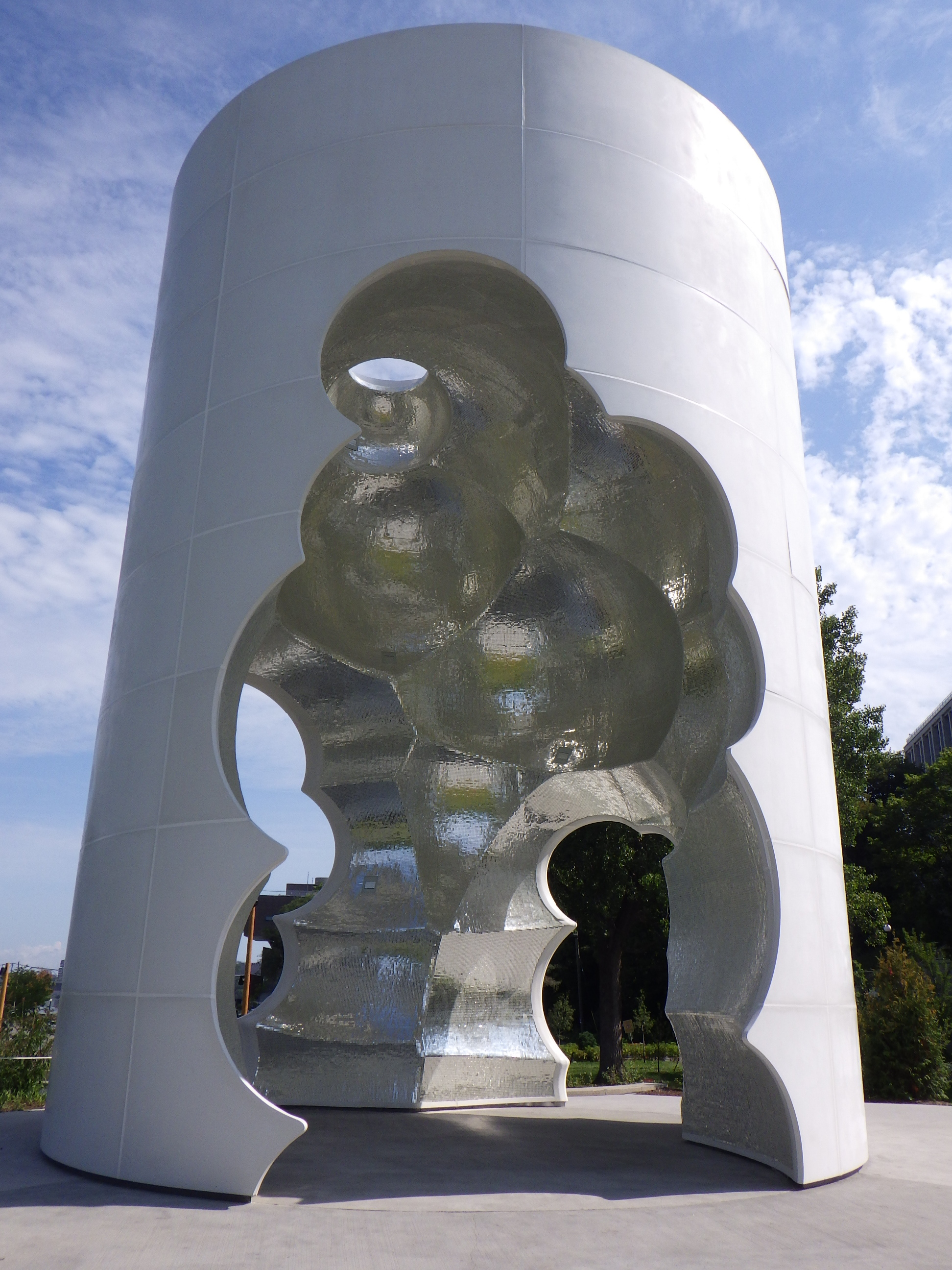
Thunderhead, Canada’s 2SLGBTQI+ National Monument

The 2SLGBTQI+ National Monument, known as Thunderhead (French: Coup de tonnerre), is a public monument in Ottawa, Ontario, Canada, dedicated to the history of lesbian, gay, bisexual, transgender, queer and two-spirit communities in Canada. The monument was launched by the LGBT Purge Fund, an organization created from the 2018 settlement of the class action suit against the Government of Canada by victims of the purges of LGBTQ employees from the federal civil service in the 1960s.

In 2020 the fund and the National Capital Commission announced the planned site, a parkland site on Wellington Street between Library and Archives Canada and the Portage Bridge, and launched a design competition for artists and architects to submit proposals.

In November 2021, the five shortlisted designs were unveiled. They included The Lens, by Fathom Studio, Two Row Architect and MVRDV; A Glass Bowl, by MASS Design Group and Stephen Andrews; Bapiiwin, by SOM, HTFC, Rebecca Belmore, Noam Gonick, Lyle Dick and Iraklis Lampropoulos; Thunderhead, by Public City, Shawna Dempsey and Lorri Millan and Albert McLeod; and OnCommonGround by bbb architects Ottawa, PWP Landscape Architects, WSP Engineering, Nadia Myre, Udo Schliemann, Robert Lepage, Nicole Crevier and Trudi Fontaine.

In March 2022, the Thunderhead design was announced as the final winner by LGBT Purge Fund director Michelle Douglas. It will feature a mirrored thunderhead cloud inside a large column surrounded by an orchard, a medicinal garden, a healing circle with stones selected by indigenous elders and a walking path, and is intended to serve both as a space for quiet reflection on LGBTQ history in Canada and a venue for artistic performances and protests.

The monument was slated to open in the summer of 2025, but it since got delayed to the summer of 2026. Its official opening took place on August 21, 2026.
