= The Fruit Machine (2018 film) =

- Directed by: Sarah Fodey
- Written by: Sarah Fodey
- Produced by: Han Nguyen; Derek Diorio; Sarah Fodey
- Cinematography: Karl Roeder; Michael Tien
- Edited by: Matt West; Justin Wotherspoon
- Production company: SandBay Entertainment
- Distributed by: TVOntario
- Release date: June 1, 2018 (Inside Out)
- Running time: 81 minutes
- Country: Canada
- Language: English

The Fruit Machine is a 2018 Canadian documentary film, directed by Sarah Fodey. The film focuses on the systemic discrimination against LGBT employees of Canada's federal public service and members of the military by the Canadian Armed Forces and the Royal Canadian Mounted Police from the 1950s to the 1990s. The film profiles the "fruit machine", a controversial device used by the Canadian government in the 1950s and 1960s in an attempt to identify LGBT employees and disqualify them from the civil service, and its effects on the people whose lives and careers were disrupted or destroyed by the test.

Figures interviewed in the film include Michelle Douglas, John Ibbitson, John Sawatsky, Peaches Latour, and Gary Kinsman.

The film premiered at the Inside Out Film and Video Festival on June 1, 2018, and had selected other film festival screenings before airing as a TVOntario special presentation on September 29.

The film received a Canadian Screen Award nomination for Best Documentary Program at the 7th Canadian Screen Awards in 2019.
