= Anti-gay purges in Canada =

Expulsion of suspected homosexuals from Canadian civil service

A series of anti-gay purges in Canada occurred between the 1950s and the 1990s, consisting of mass discrimination and expulsion of Canadian workers in the civil service, Royal Canadian Mounted Police and armed forces due to their suspected homosexuality.

During the early stages of the Cold War, increased surveillance and interference from the Soviet Union resulted in the Canadian government and military becoming increasingly worried about the loyalty of their employees. In the late 1940s and early 1950s, the RCMP was charged with investigating the loyalties, and later the reliability of character, of civil servants and Canadian armed forces members.

The Canadian government determined that homosexuality was a "character defect" and security risk as homosexuals could be possible targets for blackmail by the Soviets. In response to the Canadian government's and the military's concerns, the RCMP began a purge to investigate and discover homosexuality in areas of the Canadian workforce that were deemed important for national security.

The purge was characterized by the intensity of its investigations, with security personnel often using extreme questioning tactics and pseudo-scientific devices, such as the fruit machine. As a result, people were often forced into confession or made to spy on their co-workers. Additionally, numerous LGBTQ individuals lost their security clearance and were demoted or terminated.

In October 1992, the federal government acknowledged that LGBTQ discrimination could not be justified based on Section 15 of the Canadian Charter of Rights and Freedoms. Prime Minister Justin Trudeau formally apologized in November 2017 for the country's past discriminatory policies and guaranteed a $145 million settlement for affected Canadians.

== Background ==
=== 1940s Gouzenko Affair and Soviet espionage ===
Questions about loyalty within the civil service began to preoccupy the Canadian government in 1945 following Soviet cipher clerk Igor Gouzenko's defection. The details of the defection revealed that Soviet Union had a large spy network in Canada that compromised the Canadian civil service, military and National Research Council. Following the defection, the Canadian government launched the Kellock–Taschereau Royal Commission in 1946. The affair concluded that numerous government workers had betrayed the government. In response to the commission, the government created a new committee within the Privy Council of top civil servants and members of the RCMP. The committee was charged with overseeing security within the civil service, and investigating civil servants who had believably questionable loyalties.

=== Early investigations and questioning political loyalty ===
Starting in 1948, several cabinet directives were sent out by the committee asking the RCMP to investigate into the loyalty of government workers. During this time, the RCMP would investigate a civil servant through a file check or field investigation. A person would be flagged for investigation if officials suspected them of holding "subversive political associations", for example, if a worker was thought to have connections to communist or fascist organizations.

=== Reliability of character in investigations ===
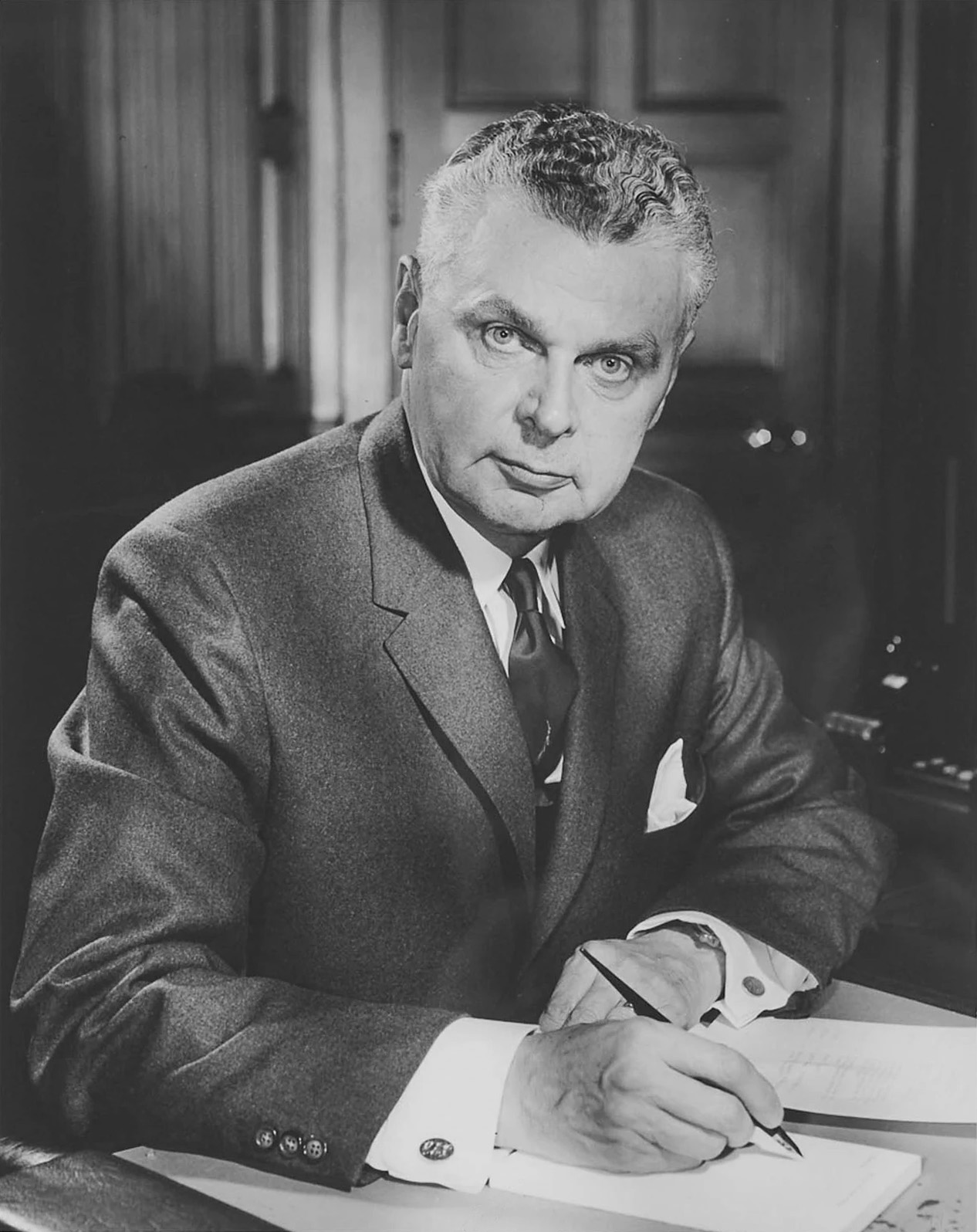
Prime Minister John Diefenbaker

During the 1950s, Privy Council changed the criteria needed for civil servants to keep or maintain their security clearance. In addition to having to prove their loyalty, civil servants were required to prove their reliability of character.

The cabinet directive introducing these new criteria described a person who was unreliable as someone with "defects in their character which may lead to indiscretion or dishonesty, or may make them the subjects of blackmail". In response to the new criteria, the Directorate of Security and Intelligence created the subdivision called "Character Weakness" in 1956.

If a person could not meet these criteria, they would no longer be able to have access to classified information. Therefore they would either lose their job, be demoted or not be hired.

Shortly after, Prime Minister John Diefenbaker inquired into these new criteria because he was unsure that a person found to have character weakness should have the same consequences as a person found to be disloyal.

=== Homosexuality as a character defect ===
Once Diefenbaker made his inquiry, the security panel began trying to define what a character defect might be. The focus was immediately placed upon homosexuality as a character defect.

The first study into the matter was written by Paul Frazer, a member of the security panel; in his report, it was explained that homosexuality was, in fact, not a character defect and that, contrary to popular narratives coming out of the United Kingdom and the United States, homosexuality was not a threat.

The security panel rejected Frazer's report and moved forward with characterizing homosexuality as a character flaw. Once the panel rejected Frazer's report, another member of the panel, D.F. Wall released his study, which outlined how homosexuality was a threat and that those suspected of it should not be trusted. The panel then accepted D.F. Wall's report and applied it to the list of Character flaws. Homosexuality was different than all the other character flaws as it did not require physical evidence as proof.

=== American influence ===
The Canadian government's response to homosexuality was deeply influenced by policy enactments of that of the United States. Given the necessity to appease American security interests alongside their own, the federal government adopted identical policies aimed at rooting out homosexual employees that reached far beyond security rationale to blatant homophobia. US influence was further cemented into the purge through the information and criteria of homosexual detection deriving from the American psychiatric community. The move to restrict and remove those deemed with 'character weakness' or homosexual traits had been motivated by the United States own purging whereas "homosexuals 'are unsuitable for employment in the Federal Government' because of their 'degraded,' 'illegal,' and 'immoral' activities rendered them innately unreliable.'"

Canadian officials followed in the footsteps of the US in their tightening of national security while justifying their actions as one that brings closer the relationship between Canada's intelligence agencies and that of their allies. The significance of these relations and the need of adherence can be summarized by stating that:

Canada's international alliances require that it be able to assure its allies, with whom it participates in common defence arrangements, that it has a sound system of internal security. Allied countries will not entrust Canadian officials and political leaders with secret information unless Canada has in place effective structures and procedures for detecting and preventing foreign espionage.

=== Purges under the Royal Canadian Mounted Police ===
The RCMP began a purge to investigate and discover homosexuality in areas of the Canadian workforce that were deemed important for national security. The sexuality of government, RCMP, and armed forces workers became the primary concern of the RCMP in the late 1950s. Anyone could have been accused of homosexuality, and if, after an intense series of investigations, a person was found to be homosexual, they would lose their security clearance, causing them to be demoted or lose their job entirely.

Homosexuality eventually became the leading cause for internal investigations, with the civil service seeing so many accusations that the RCMP began struggling to keep up with them. During the purges, thousands of employees were investigated and fired for their sexuality. The level of severity of the purge can be noted given how "the head of the RCMPSS, William Kelly, had bragged at a Commonwealth security conference in May 1963 about the 'extensive scale' of the gay purges in Canada".

== Surveillance operations ==
During the cold war, the RCMP's Directorate of Security and Intelligence had a subdivision called "Character Weakness" which had the task of rooting out homosexual men and women working for the government. By the late 1960s, the RCMP had created a list of thousands of suspected and confirmed homosexuals including 9 thousand in Ottawa. Although their end goal was to find homosexuals working for the government, their surveillance and harassment was not just limited to government employees but included members of the general public as well.

Most of the people on the list of suspected and confirmed homosexuals were not civil servants, in the military or in the police force. RCMP officers under cover would go gather in bars frequented by gay patronage and take photos of people while hiding their camera behind a newspaper. They'd then arrest people in raids of places that gay people liked to meet up for sex, such as parks, interrogate them and collect the names of every homosexual they knew in exchange for dropping charges.

== Interrogations ==
=== Informants ===
Same sex sexual acts were illegal in Canada until 1969. The RCMP used the threat of filing charges to pressure Canadians into becoming informants. The informants would then be used to confirm if certain members of the civil service, police or military were gay. The RCMP had a hard time getting cooperation, especially with the culture change in the 1960s when gay people started to form a more organized community. They started to circulate information on what to do if the RCMP questions you and stressed not giving them any names. Anyone who gave the police names risked being shunned by the community.

=== Fruit machine ===
The fruit machine was a government funded scientific project in the 1960s that sought to develop the ability to detect homosexuality in the participant. It was invented in order to help find informants and possible homosexuals in a more economical function. The series of tests were centred around photographic measurements of the eye as the participant would be shown both hetero- and homoerotic photos. The term fruit machine is alleged to have been coined by a Royal Canadian Mountain Police officer who was aware of the project. The controversial project was initiated by the Privy Council Office with encouragement by then RCMP Commissioner Walter Harvison. The research was headed by Carleton University's Dr. Frank Robert Wake, with support from various officials in federal departments. This included assistance of the Defence Research Board and the National Defence Medical Centre. Wake and Don Wall of the Privy Council Office (PCO) visited the United States in 1961-62 in order to learn from the experience of the FBI, CIA and the U.S National Security Agency (NSA) in dealing with their so-called 'homosexual problem.'

The overarching goal of the project, as explained by the RCMP commissioner, was "to prevent the 'engagement of homosexuals in the government service on the grounds that they are practising criminals under Sections 147 and 149 of the Criminal Code of Canada'". The fruit machine project had overall encountered numerous difficulties in its efficiency and success rates. The RCMP had failed to gather sufficient numbers of homosexuals as test subjects and found a significant reluctance in heterosexuals volunteering for the project.

By 1964, no practical results from Wake's research were achieved and the project dragged through the 1960s with little positive result, partially for lack of sufficient individuals to test, especially women.

=== Confirmed homosexuals ===
The RCMP had three classifications for homosexuals: suspected, alleged and confirmed. In order for someone to be classified as a confirmed homosexual, they had to either confess or be convicted of sexual deviation by a court. People became suspected or alleged homosexuals when they were named in interrogations. Once someone was confirmed, they became officially a real homosexual, and then actions could be taken against them such as removing them from their position with the government, police or military.

== Case studies ==
=== John Watkins ===
John Watkins served as the Canadian chargé d'affaires in Moscow from 1948 to 1951, and as the Canadian Ambassador to the Soviet Union from 1954 to 1956. During his tenure in Moscow, Watkins engaged in a homosexual relationship with a Russian male. Soviet secret agents attempted and failed to blackmail Watkins for his liaison. Following Watkins' return to Canada, he was interrogated by the RCMP and resisted their accusations. Although the RCMP reported no evidence that suggested Watkins succumbed to Soviet blackmail, the RCMP continued to interrogate Watkins. In 1964, Watkins had a heart attack during his interrogations. Following the heart attack, the RCMP refused to release the full report dictating the interrogation, and the chief prosecutor of the interrogations refused to testify.

=== John Wendell Holmes ===
John Wendell Holmes served as the Canadian Chargé d'Affaires in Moscow from 1947 to 1948, and served as the Assistant Under-Secretary of State for the Department of External Affairs in 1953 until 1960. Holmes was forced to resign from the Department of External Affairs after his sexuality was discovered. Colleagues of Holmes described him as an incredibly capable Canadian diplomat. In recognition of his contributions, Holmes was made an Officer of the Order of Canada in 1969.

== End of the Purge ==
=== Michelle Douglas ===
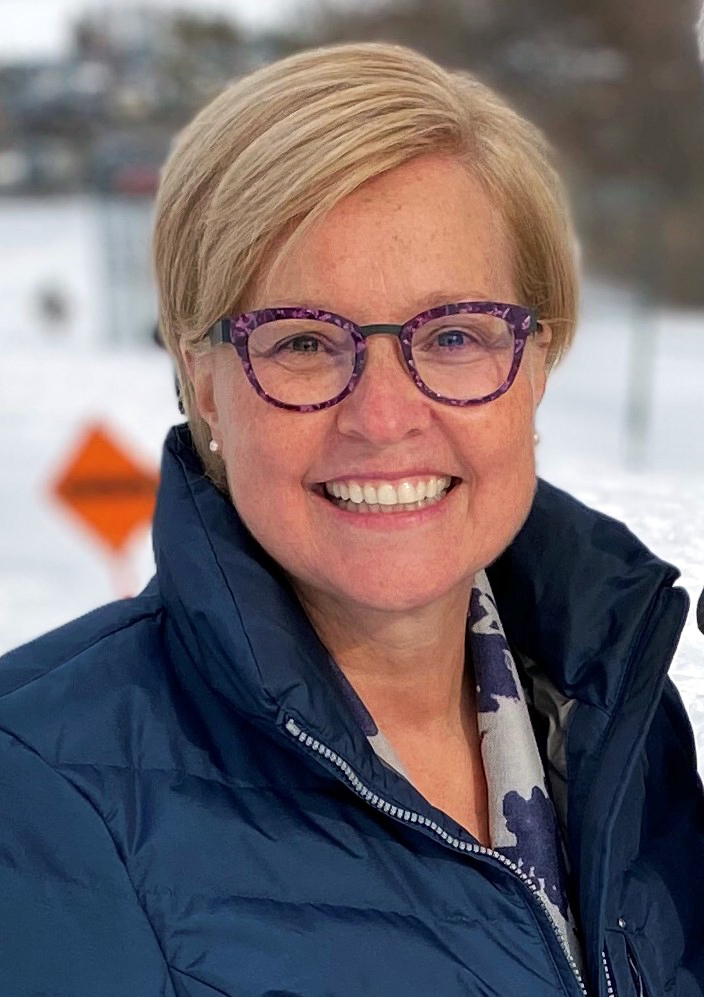
Michelle Douglas, LGBTQ activist who launched a successful lawsuit against the Canadian Military for their discrimination of LGBTQ people.

Michelle Douglas served in the Canadian Armed Forces as an officer from 1986 to 1989. Despite having an exceptional record in the armed forces, Douglas was demoted in 1988 and honourably discharged from the military in 1989 due to her sexual orientation.

In 1990, Douglas launched a lawsuit against the Department of National Defence. In October 1992, the Canadian military settled the lawsuit for $100,000 plus court costs, and the federal government acknowledged that the discrimination that Douglas faced could not be justified based on Section 15 of the Canadian Charter of Rights and Freedoms.

=== Changing policy ===
As a result of Douglas' lawsuit, the federal government ended its discriminatory policy against gays and lesbians, and allowed LGBTQ members to serve in the Canadian Armed Forces. Following the conclusion of the lawsuit, the Department of National Defence announced that homosexual applicants and members would be treated equally with their heterosexuals counterparts.

== Apology ==
In 1992, Prime Minister Brian Mulroney stated that the LGBTQ purges were "one of the great outrages and violations of fundamental human liberty that one would have seen for an extended period of time". Although Mulroney denounced the acts of the Canadian government, he did not issue a former apology or a inquiry into the purges.

On November 28, 2017, Prime Minister Justin Trudeau stood up in the House of Commons and gave an official apology for the Gay Purge. In his statement, he referred to the purge as a "witch hunt" and talked about how its victims "lost their dignity and their careers, and had their dreams, and indeed their lives shattered". Leaders from each official party in the House of Commons also rose to express their regret with regards to the anti-gay purges.

The federal government also guaranteed $145 million in a compensation settlement. $110 million was included for individual compensation and legal fees. An additional $15 million was included for historical "reconciliation and memorialization".

Although many were grateful for the apology, some, including scholars, say it did not go far enough. Many scholars have expressed their frustration with continued the denial of access to information when they try to study the purge in more detail.

In 2016, students at Carleton University demanded that the university also issue an apology as the fruit machine was created by Robert Wake, who was then the chair of Carleton's psychology department. No apology was forthcoming at the time.

=== LGBTQ2+ national monument ===
In 2020, the National Capital Commission announced a monument commemorating the purge. When finished, the memorial will be able to seat up to 2,000 people and will be located near the headquarters of Library and Archives Canada. In 2022 the design for the monument was announced with its completion expected to be sometime in 2025, before the opening was delayed to mid-2026.

== See also ==
- Canada in the Cold War
- Gary Kinsman
- Everett Klippert
- LGBTQ history in Canada
