= Michelle Douglas =

Canadian human rights activist

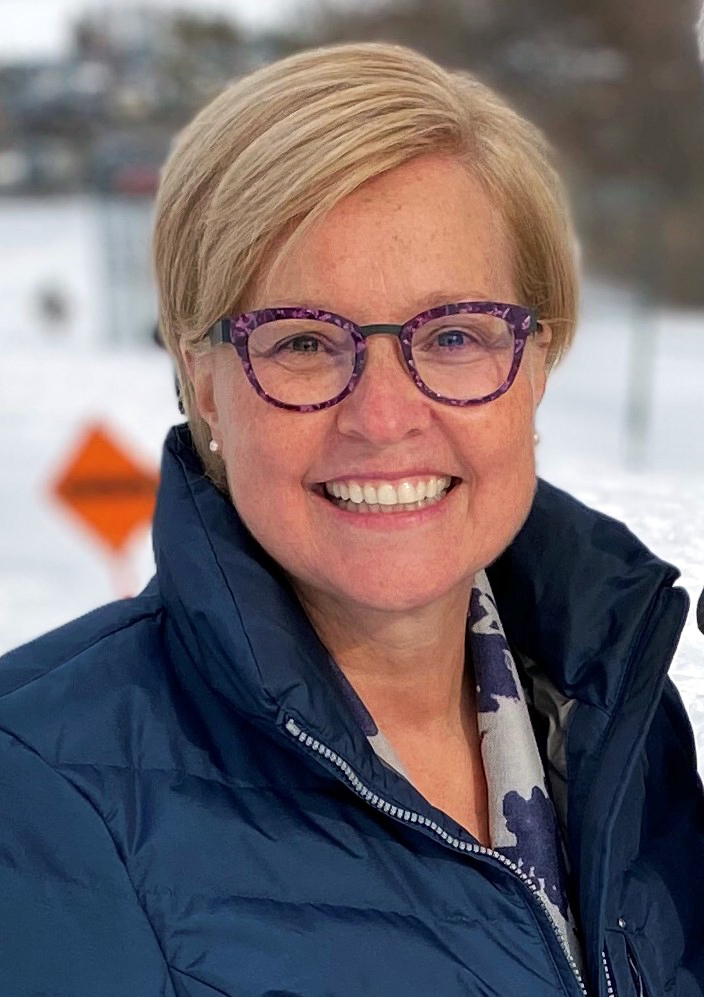
- Born: December 30, 1963 (age 62); Ottawa, Ontario, Canada
- Known for: LGBTQ2+ rights activist

Michelle D. Douglas (born December 30, 1963) is a Canadian human rights activist who launched a landmark legal challenge in the Federal Court of Canada against the military's discriminatory policies against LGBTQ+ service members. Douglas herself served as an officer in the Canadian Armed Forces from 1986 to 1989. She was honourably discharged from the military in 1989 under the military's discriminatory anti-gay purge. In 2024, Douglas received an honorary degree from Mount Saint Vincent University.

== Gay purge legal challenge ==
After graduating from Carleton University with a major in law in 1985, Douglas joined the Canadian Forces in 1986. She was soon promoted to the Special Investigations Unit—where she was the first woman to be promoted to the Unit as an officer. Absurdly, it was also the Unit responsible for running the anti-gay purge for the armed forces. In 1988, she came under investigation and was transferred to another position before losing her security clearance. Despite having an exemplary service record and repeatedly being at the top of her class, in 1989, she was released from the Forces because she was lesbian. She was dismissed under administrative release item 5d: "Not Advantageously Employable Due to Homosexuality". During her trial, Douglas reported that while under investigation, she was taken to a hotel room where two male officers questioned her about her sexual activities and forced her to like men. She was also prevented from seeking legal advice after the incident.

Douglas subsequently launched a $550,000 lawsuit against the Department of National Defence in January 1990 where she was represented by Clayton Ruby. In October 1992, just before Douglas' legal challenge went to trial, the Canadian military abandoned its policy banning gay and lesbian service members and settled the case.

== Subsequent service and activism ==
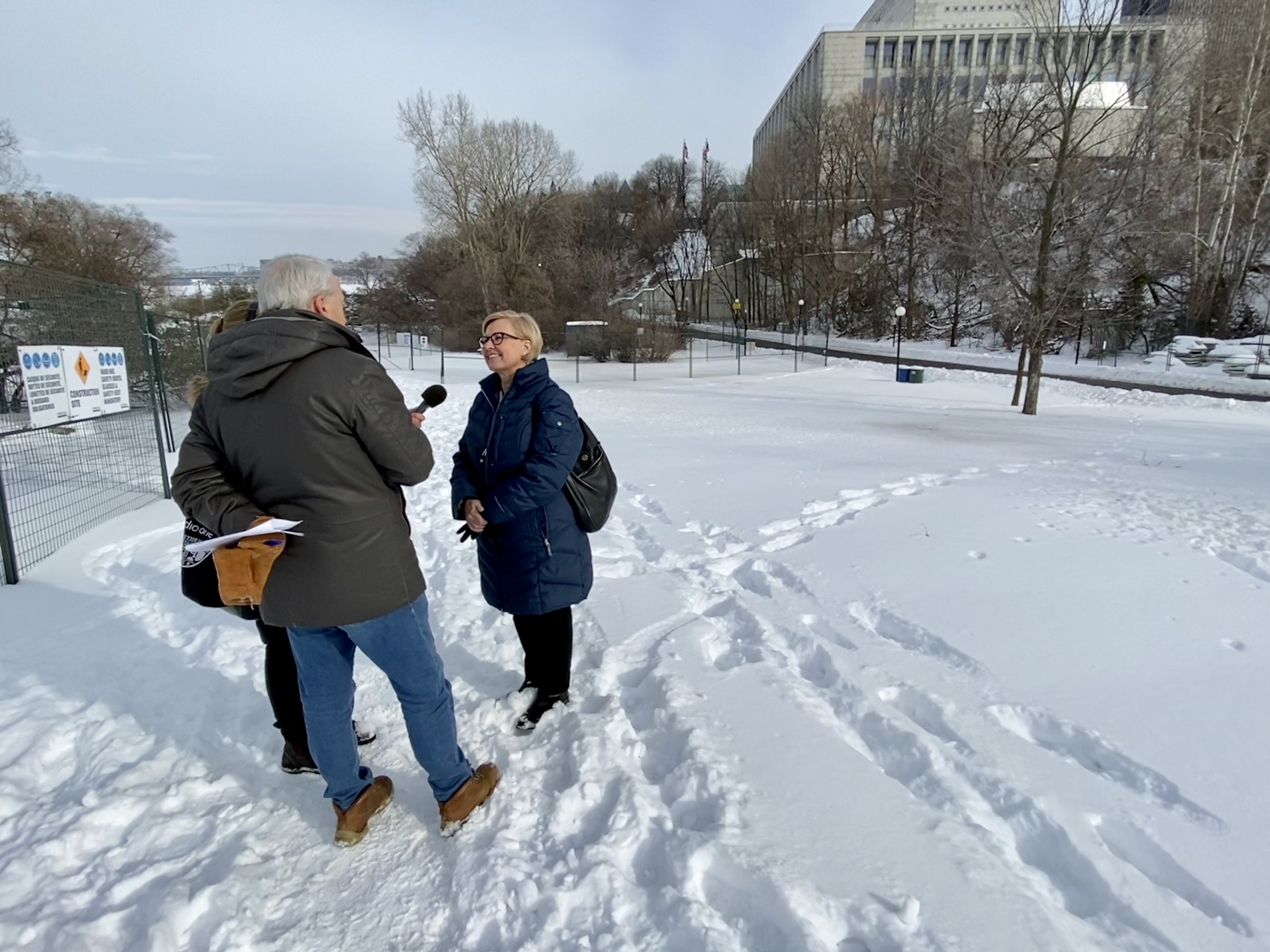
Michelle Douglas being interviewed by CBC's Chris Hall at the future site of the LGBTQ2+ National Monument in Ottawa, January 2020

Douglas' experience in the military was the start of 30 years of social justice and human rights activism.

Douglas has supported other landmark rulings by participating as an intervener in the M. v. H. and Vriend v Alberta cases in the Supreme Court of Canada. She formerly served as the Chair of the Foundation for Equal Families and later served at chair of the board of The 519 Church Street Community Centre in Toronto. She was also a founding member of the Rainbow Railroad LGBT refugee organization in Toronto. Douglas was a member of the board of directors of WE Charity (formerly Free the Children) from 2005 to 2020. She resigned as chair of the board of directors of WE Charity in March 2020. She currently serves as a member of the board of directors of the Michaelle Jean Foundation.

Professionally, Douglas served as the Director of International Relations at the Canadian Department of Justice. She retired in September 2019 after a 30-year career in the federal public service. In the same year, Douglas was appointed as the executive Ddrector of the LGBT Purge Fund. The LGBT Purge Fund manages a fund of $15 million to support reconciliation projects relating to the LGBT Purge. This includes leading a project to build the LGBTQ2+ National Monument in Ottawa, which is expected to open in 2024. In January 2020, the National Capital Commission approved the future site for the LGBTQ2+ National Monument by Wellington Street and Portage Bridge in Ottawa.

In 2000, Pride Toronto named Douglas and Sky Gilbert as parade Grand Marshals. Douglas was awarded the Queen Elizabeth II Diamond Jubilee Medal in 2012.

A portrait of Douglas, by artist Laura Spaldin, is held by The ArQuives: Canada's LGBTQ2+ Archives' National Portrait Collection, in honor of her contributions to LGBTQ2+ rights in Canada.

On December 13, 2023, the Minister of National Defence, The Honourable Bill Blair appointed Douglas as the first Honorary Colonel for Professional Conduct and Culture.
