= Fruit machine (homosexuality test) =

Canadian device meant to identify gay men

The "fruit machine" (Note: The term is a play on "fruit machine" meaning slot machine, and the word fruit, a slang term for gay or effeminate men, that originated in the 1900s.) was a battery of psychological tests developed in Canada by Dr. Frank Robert Wake, a psychology professor with Carleton University in the 1960s. It was hoped that Dr. Wake's research program would be able to help the Government of Canada identify gay men working in the Public Service or to prevent gay people from obtaining government jobs. The subjects were made to view erotic imagery and "homosexual words", while the device measured the subject's pupil dilation (pupillary response test), and an early form of lie detector also measured their perspiration and pulse in response to the erotic images and words. The crude apparatus was constructed by the Royal Canadian Mounted Police's (RCMP) Identification Branch.

The research program was employed in Canada approximately between 1960 and 1964 as part of a campaign to eliminate all gay men from the civil service, the RCMP, and the Canadian Armed Forces (CAF). Thousands of Canadians lost their jobs or resigned, and some died by suicide. Although funding for the project was cut off in the late 1960s, the RCMP investigations continued, and the RCMP collected files on well over 9,000 people.

The machine used a chair similar to that used by dentists. It had a pulley with a camera going towards the pupils, with a black box located in front of it that displayed pictures. The pictures ranged from the mundane to sexually explicit photos of men and women. It had previously been determined that the pupils would dilate in relation to the amount of interest in the picture, in a technique termed "the pupillary response test".

People were first led to believe that the machine's purpose was to rate stress. After knowledge of its real purpose became widespread, few people volunteered for it.

In November 2017, Prime Minister Justin Trudeau apologised for the Government of Canada's previous policies and discrimination against LGBTQ Canadians, including the use of the fruit machine.

== Faulty test parameters ==
The functional mechanism of the "fruit machine" was pseudo-scientific and its results inaccurate. First, the pupillary response test was based on fatally flawed assumptions: That the chosen visual stimuli would produce a specific involuntary reaction that could be measured scientifically with 1960s technology; that homosexuals and heterosexuals would respond to these stimuli differently with enough frequency and specificity to sort them; and that there were only two types of sexuality. One physiological problem with the method was that the researchers failed to take into account the varying sizes of the pupils and the differing distances between the eyes. Other problems that existed were that the pictures of the subjects' eyes had to be taken from an angle, as the camera would have blocked the subjects' view of the photographs if it were placed directly in front. Also, the amount of light coming from the photographs changed with each slide, causing the subjects' pupils to dilate in a way that was unrelated to their interest in the picture. Finally, the dilation of the pupils was also exceedingly difficult to measure, as the change was often smaller than one millimeter.

The idea was based on an unrelated study done by an American university professor, which measured the sizes of the subjects' pupils as they walked through the aisles of grocery stores.

== In popular culture ==
Brian Drader's 1998 play The Fruit Machine juxtaposes the fruit machine project with a parallel storyline about contemporary homophobia.

Sarah Fodey's 2018 documentary film The Fruit Machine profiled the effects of the project on several of the people affected by it.

== See also ==
- Gaydar
- GCC homosexuality test
- Lie detector polygraph, a device to detect the physiological responses indicative of lying
- Lavender scare
- Penile plethysmograph
- Vaginal photoplethysmography
- Voight-Kampff machine, a fictional device that detects non-human emotional responses
