= List of Flashpoint characters =

This article lists characters who have appeared on the Canadian drama-action television series Flashpoint.

Main cast of Flashpoint's Strategic Response Unit. From left to right: Ed Lane (Hugh Dillon), Julianna "Jules" Callaghan (Amy Jo Johnson), Lewis "Lou" Young (Mark Taylor), Gregory "Greg" Parker (Enrico Colantoni), Mike "Spike" Scarlatti (Sergio Di Zio), Roland "Rolie" Cray (Gabriel Hogan) and Kevin "Wordy" Wordsworth (Michael Cram). Gabriel Hogan only appeared in the first episode Scorpio and was replaced by David Paetkau, who plays Sam Braddock. He is not included in the photo.

== SRU ==
The Strategic Response Unit, modelled after the Toronto Police Service's Emergency Task Force unit, is responsible for high-risk situations that cannot be resolved by regular police officers, such as activities involving armed criminals or explosives, or requiring hostage rescues or counter-terrorism measures. The SRU is also responsible for providing support to other police officers when requested. There are several teams within the SRU, Team One being the primary unit featured in the show.

== Main characters ==
| Character | Portrayed by | Seasons | | | | |
| Character | Portrayed by | 1 | 2 | 3 | 4 | 5 |
|---|---|---|---|---|---|---|
| Sgt. Gregory "Greg" Parker | Enrico Colantoni | Main | Main | Main | Main | Main |
| Cst. Edward "Ed" Lane | Hugh Dillon | Main | Main | Main | Main | Main |
| Cst. Julianna "Jules" Callaghan | Amy Jo Johnson | Main | Main | Main | Main | Main |
| Cst. Samuel "Sam" Braddock | David Paetkau | Main | Main | Main | Main | Main |
| Cst. Michelangelo "Spike" Scarlatti | Sergio Di Zio | Main | Main | Main | Main | Main |
| Cst./Det. Kevin "Wordy" James Wordsworth | Michael Cram | Main | Main | Main | Main | Guest |
| Cst. Lewis "Lou" Young | Mark Taylor | Main | Main | | | |
| Dr. Amanda Luria | Ruth Marshall | Main | | | | |
| Cst. Winnie Camden | Tattiawna Jones | Recurring | Main | Main | Main | Main |
| Cst. Leah Kerns | Oluniké Adeliyi | | Recurring | Recurring | | Main |
| Cst. Rafik "Raf" Rousseau | Clé Bennett | | | | Main | Guest |

=== Greg Parker ===
Greg Parker
- First appearance: "Scorpio" (episode 1.01)
- Last appearance: "Keep the Peace (Part 2)" (episode 5.13)
- Portrayed by: Enrico Colantoni

In-universe information
- Full name: Gregory Parker
- Nickname: Boss Sarge
- Spouse: Joanne Parker (ex-wife)
- Significant other: Marina Levin (girlfriend)
- Children: Dean Parker (son)

Career
- Department: Police academy (instructor); Previous: SRU (Team Sergeant, Team One) (S1-5)
- Rank: Sergeant

Sergeant Gregory "Greg" Parker is Team One's Sergeant and team leader, functioning as their main crisis negotiator. As such, he prefers that situations be resolved through negotiations instead of lethal force, keeping that as a last resort. He learned the art of negotiation when he was able to survive a hard life under his strict father.

Prior to joining the SRU Parker served as a homicide detective, the stresses of which caused him to develop an alcohol addiction which resulted in his divorce and estrangement from his wife and son Dean. His ex-wife gained full custody of Dean and they moved to Dallas, Texas.

Greg's own troubled personal history is frequently used by himself as a way to connect to both incident subjects and innocents alike, but can also be a weakness that sees him struggle to always follow the rules of the job. This caring nature puts him under increased scrutiny during season 4 when he knowingly allows Sam and Jules' relationship to develop beyond the professional, which almost sees him lose his position within the SRU. He himself during this time also develops a romantic relationship with a woman named Marina, which he himself is shown to be torn over due to having met after she was the victim in an incident the team responded to.

Greg's attempts to reconnect with Dean form the main series arc for himself, with early attempts to reconnect both via mail and a personal visit being rebuffed, though beginning in season 3 Dean slowly begins to reconnect with his father and eventually moves back to Toronto. Dean's subsequent announcement he intends to follow his father by joining the police causes subsequent friction, though Greg eventually accepts his son's decision.

In the two-part series finale, "Keep the Peace", Greg is shot in the leg while disarming a bomb, forcing his retirement from the SRU. A year later he subsequently takes up a teaching position at the police academy, and is at ease in his relationship with Marina.

=== Ed Lane ===
Ed Lane
- First appearance: "Scorpio" (episode 1.01)
- Last appearance: "Keep the Peace (Part 2)" (episode 5.13)
- Portrayed by: Hugh Dillon

In-universe information
- Full name: Edward Tucker Lane
- Nickname: Eddie
- Family: Roy Lane (brother)
- Spouse: Sophie Lane
- Children: Clark Lane (son); Isabelle Lane (daughter)

Career
- Department: SRU (Leader, Team One)
- Rank: Sergeant; Constable (S1-5)

Constable (later Sergeant) Edward "Ed" Lane is a veteran of the Strategic Response Unit; he serves as the team's tactical leader in the field. Though he has been trained to use lethal force and keeps up a cool façade in front of his team, Ed remains troubled with the fact that he sometimes needs to use it to save the lives of others.

During earlier seasons Ed's inability to open up about the trauma he suffers as a result of the job as well as its unpredictable hours slowly begins to impact his relationship with his wife, Sophie, and teenage son, Clark, leading to a temporary estrangement from Sophie in particular during season 3 after she falls pregnant. The couple are able to work through their problems following Ed being shot in the finale of season 3 and following the birth of their daughter Isabelle, with Ed working on rebalancing his personal life commitments with his professional ones.

His relationship with Clark however remains under tension throughout the show's run. While always loving, Ed is shown to frequently struggle to connect with his son due to their differing personalities as well as what Ed sees in the job seeing him wanting to protect Clark from falling into such situations. In season 5 this is thrown into further strain when Clark, along with Greg's son Dean, shows an interest in joining the police like his father and uncle.

Ed is not the only member of his family in uniform, with his brother Roy a detective within the Guns and Gangs Task Force. Despite both being cops his relationship with his brother is strained due to Roy's resentment of Ed's success while Ed views his brother as a loose cannon who is incapable of following procedure. During season 3 this friction sees Roy accidentally cause his partner's death during an attempted bust of a gun dealer, with Roy almost dying in a subsequent "off the books" personal investigation to atone for his mistake. This event, which successfully causes the arrest of a major gun smuggler, sees the pair finally reconcile.

In the opening episode of season five, "Broken Peace", Ed is forced to fatally shoot a young woman to stop her from killing her abusive father while he holds her mother at gunpoint. While the team are cleared as they were following protocol, Ed is left guilt-ridden from the incident and eventually seeks counselling as he struggles with doubts regarding his fitness to lead the team though eventually comes to terms with the imperfections of the job.

After the events of "Keep the Peace", Ed is promoted to Sergeant of Team One following Greg's forced retirement due to his injuries.

=== Jules Callaghan ===
Jules Callaghan
- First appearance: "Scorpio" (episode 1.01)
- Last appearance: "Keep the Peace (Part 2)" (episode 5.13)
- Portrayed by: Amy Jo Johnson

In-universe information
- Full name: Julianna Callaghan
- Nickname: Jules
- Family: Unnamed father Unnamed mother (deceased); 4 older brothers
- Spouse: Sam Braddock
- Children: Sadie Braddock (daughter)

Career
- Department: SRU (Team One)
- Rank: Constable

Constable Julianna "Jules" Callaghan begins the series serving as the team's secondary sniper to Ed as well as a secondary negotiator to Greg. Before joining the SRU, Jules served as an officer with the Royal Canadian Mounted Police having followed her father into the police service (despite his reservations). Initially Jules is shown to be the only woman currently serving on an SRU team (leading the changing rooms to be labelled 'Men' and 'Jules' at the series outset). While used to working in male-dominated environments, growing up as the only girl in a family of five children, she is shown to feel the pressure placed on her keenly through the series' run with fears that she is under more scrutiny as a result.

The relationship between Jules and Sam Braddock serves as the pairs' main arc throughout the show's run. In season one both allow their relationship to stray from professional to romantic, despite knowing the possible professional ramifications (with Jules suspecting they'd land on her more than Sam). Jules is shot by a sniper during the events of the finale of the first season, the resulting period of recuperation seeing her end their relationship (by then an open secret amongst the team) due to her belief it could cause problems for and within the 'family' (SRU Team One). During this time her status as the only woman on an SRU team comes to an end after Donna Sabine (Jessica Steen) succeeds in stepping in to her spot on the team, who after Jules' recovery moves to Team Three.

Despite the initial ending of their romantic relationship the pair remain close, eventually rekindling it during season four. Though they attempt to keep it a secret, Greg soon becomes aware of the relationship but agrees to cover for them. The relationship leaks out however following a stray comment on an incident audio transcript, with the team placed under investigation as a result while Greg is temporarily suspended. The situation is resolved following an incident in the season four finale where the pair are shown to be capable of maintaining professional standards despite their romantic relationship, where Sam follows "Priority of Life" in extracting a seriously wounded hostage ahead of Jules despite the decision possibly leading to Jules' death, with both allowed to remain serving on Team One. During season five Jules' is revealed to be pregnant, and the pair marry in the opening of "Keep the Peace". Following the finale's year jump the pair are shown to have a daughter, Sadie.

=== Sam Braddock ===
Sam Braddock
- First appearance: "Scorpio" (episode 1.01)
- Last appearance: "Keep the Peace (Part 2)" (episode 5.13)
- Portrayed by: David Paetkau

In-universe information
- Full name: Samuel W. Braddock
- Nickname: Samtastic (by Spike)
- Occupation: Previous: Master Corporal, Canadian Army
- Family: General Braddock (father); Unnamed mother Natalie Braddock (sister); Unnamed sister (deceased)
- Spouse: Julianna "Jules" Callaghan
- Children: Sadie Braddock (daughter)

Career
- Department: SRU: Leader, Team Three; Team One (S1-5); Previous: 51 Division (patrol officer)
- Rank: Constable

Constable Samuel "Sam" Braddock joins Team One during the events of the pilot episode to replace the newly promoted Roland 'Rolie' Cray. Prior to joining the SRU, Sam had spent time within the police before serving in the Canadian Army' as a special forces sniper with Joint Task Force 2 in Afghanistan. At the beginning of the series his sudden desire to transfer to the police is left unexplained, only later being revealed that he had left under a cloud following a mission that resulted in him killing his best friend following a miscommunication of orders.

Due to his regimented upbringing and experiences in the military, Sam is shown to initially struggle with connecting with incident subjects when it comes to negotiation (at one point during a simulated exercise heatedly calling a 'drug dealer' a "jackass") but is routinely relied upon when dealing with subjects from a military background. Sam's views on the use of force when dealing with subjects also evolves over the course of the series, going from initially viewing it as a more reliable solution to a more nuanced approach. He is however frequently relied upon for situations that may require lethal force due to his background.

As already mentioned, much of Sam's series arc relates to his relationship with Jules. Despite an initial image of being a ladies man within the team given his background, he is shown to be more emotionally vulnerable romantically with him being the one opposed to and affected by the initial ending of their relationship at the start of season two. He is also shown to be more than a little bit conflicted when Jules briefly dates a paramedic, Steve Morgan, whom she knew from school during season three.

Little of his home life is shown other than he had grown up in a high-ranking military family (his father mentioned to hold the rank of General), though had suffered tragedy after witnessing a younger sister being fatally struck by a car. He is also shown to be somewhat jealous of his other sister, Natalie, due to her carefree nature and the few expectations placed on her in comparison to those that were placed on him by his father.

At the conclusion of the series he is shown to have recently been promoted to leader of Team Three.

=== Michelangelo Scarlatti ===
Michelangelo Scarlatti
- First appearance: "Scorpio" (episode 1.01)
- Last appearance: "Keep the Peace (Part 2)" (episode 5.13)
- Portrayed by: Sergio Di Zio
- Rank: Constable

In-universe information
- Full name: Michelangelo Scarlatti
- Nicknames: Spike, Spikey
- Family: Dominic Scarlatti (father, deceased); Michelina Scarlatti (mother)

Career
- Department: SRU (Team One)
- Rank: Constable

Constable Michelangelo "Spike" Scarlatti is the team's technical analyst and demolitions expert who usually provides communications support and surveillance from the command post. During his free time he is sometimes seen trying to perfect various gadgets or trying out his anti-explosives robot, nicknamed "Babycakes". He was nicknamed 'Spike' by his former training officer because of his usually 'spikey' hair.

Coming from an Italian Canadian family, Spike is proud of the fact with him frequently mentioning this along with being skilled in Italian and following Juventus. His family is said to be from Woodbridge. Though he still lives with his parents he is estranged from his father over his job in the SRU due to his father's fears he'll die in the line of duty. In the season three finale it is revealed that his father is terminally ill, with the latter still refusing to reconcile with his son. The pair only reconcile during the events of season four, shortly before his father's death. After his father's death, Spike's mother moves back Italy to be with her family and he is forced to live on his own for the first time.

Spike is usually shown to be the most jovial of the team's members, frequently making wisecracks both on and off duty. Despite this personality he is shown to be deeply affected by the death of Constable Lewis "Lou" Young's death during season two, his best friend on the team, after the latter deliberately allowed a landmine he had stepped on go off to prevent Spike from attempting a high-risk rescue attempt that would likely have killed them both.

Beyond this Spike is shown to be one of the more "gifted" intellectually amongst the team, spending his off-hours researching and tinkering with gadgetry, which sees him being headhunted by various federal agencies throughout the series. Despite this he invariably turns them down, instead preferring to remain with the SRU.

Spike's love life, or lack thereof, is the butt of some jokes throughout the run, though it later becomes clear he harbours an infatuation for the team's dispatcher Winnie Camden. He eventually summons the courage to ask her out, discovering that the feeling is mutual but is turned down due to her "unbreakable" rule on not dating cops. In the series finale this rule is shown to be somewhat less than such, with the pair officially confirmed to be a couple.

=== Winnie Camden ===
Constable Winnie Camden (Tattiawna Jones; seasons 2–5, main; 1, recurring) serves as the team's SRU dispatcher, not only serving as their main communications channel with other parts of law enforcement but also undertaking intelligence gathering off the field that routinely proves vital in successfully resolving incidents. Despite being based at SRU headquarters there is clearly a mutual comradery between her and Team One, being affected just as much as those on the ground during incidents where members are hurt or at risk of harm.

While little is explored of her history, it is suggested she is routinely subjected to romantic attention from other officers, as a result having developed an "unbreakable" rule to dating cops. Despite this she's clearly conflicted when it comes to Spike, describing him as "perfect guy" for her when he asks her out yet still unwilling to break it. At the end of the series she is shown to have decided to make an exception to this.

=== Leah Kerns ===
Constable Leah Kerns (Oluniké Adeliyi; season 5, main; 2–3 recurring) joins the SRU following the death of Lou in season two. Despite initial friction due to the circumstances of her joining the team, she soon becomes a dependable team member due to her extensive background and experiences as a former firefighter. Though a strict professional in the job, she has history of risk-taking outside the job having suffered a serious drink-driving accident while blowing off steam following a fire she responded to where a child died. Leah goes on extended leave for "personal reasons" early in season three which are left unexplained. Leah however returns following Constable Rafik "Raf" Rousseau's departure in season five, with it being explained she had left to assist her parents after following the 2010 Haiti earthquake

== Former main characters ==
=== Kevin Wordsworth ===
Kevin "Wordy" James Wordsworth (Michael Cram; seasons 1–4, main; 5, guest) served as one of the more experienced members of Team One alongside Ed and is routinely relied upon as such, serving as the team's entry tactics and CQB expert as well as a less-lethal weapons specialist. Despite a sometimes gruff exterior he has a willingness to openly be far more emotionally available and supportive than some of the others in the team. This is explained in large part due to being an extremely devoted family man to his wife, a woman named Shelley who he had grown up with and helped escape from a previous abusive marriage, and their three daughters. His devotion is so complete to the point of using team workouts to catch up on period dramas they're watching and learning to braid hair in order to relate with them, regardless of the ridicule it sometimes engenders, and when the team is under investigation in season 3 his first thought is of being able to provide for them. Wordy eventually leaves the team during season four after being diagnosed with early-onset Parkinson's disease, fearing that despite it being treatable any performance degradation could put others on the team at risk during an incident. Following this he transfers to Guns and Gangs, where he is a detective.

=== Lewis Young ===
Constable Lewis "Lou" Young (Mark Taylor; seasons 1–2) served on the team as an experienced officer, having been motivated to join the police following adolescent experiences being involved in petty criminality. Lewis previously served with Guns and Gangs, frequently using his knowledge on street gangs to aid the team. Lou is shown to be deeply loyal to the team, in particular his best friend Spike. While attempting to investigate a suspected bomb during a coordinated terror attack he steps on a hidden landmine. Despite this he is able to defuse the bomb, before choosing to sacrifice his life to prevent Spike from attempting a high-risk and most likely fatal rescue attempt that would've killed them both.

=== Rafik Rousseau ===
Constable Rafik "Raf" Rousseau (Clé Bennett; season 4, main; 5, guest) joined Team One following Wordy's departure. Ambitious, his eagerness to learn and fit in initially manifests in a reckless streak similar to Sam's, such as entering a room with a hostile subject without approval. Outside of work he is shown to be an accomplished musician, performing as a pianist and singer. Despite his calm and collected exterior, Raf is shown to have a traumatic past having been the victim of grooming and sexual abuse at the hands of a teacher when he was in high school. This led to his father being jailed after he seriously assaulted the teacher in retaliation, though Raf remains close to him due to understanding why he did it though he remains incarcerated.

After season five's opener, "Broken Peace", Raf decides to leave the team and the SRU having decided that, while he understands the morally grey area they operate in and the need for it, he could no longer justify it to himself.

=== Donna Sabine ===
Constable Donna Sabine (Jessica Steen; seasons 2–5, recurring) initially joined as Jules' temporary replacement in Team One following her wounds at the end of season one. Donna has previously served as an undercover officer dealing with the illegal drug trade, before deciding she'd had enough of that life and what it did to officers who stayed too longer in that line of work. Despite her desire to be on the clear side of the law, she soon finds herself exposed to the complex morality of the work when forced to fatally shoot a federal agent to prevent them from executing a serial killer.

Donna later takes the initiative to move to Team Three when Jules' is declared fit to return, deliberately wanting to avoid putting Greg in the position of making a choice between them. After the move she quickly rises to become team leader, assisting Team One on multiple occasions and remaining on good terms with her former teammates. Following an attempted hit on her at her wedding relating to her days in undercover, it's Team One she turns to for assistance. In the series finale Donna and another member of Team Three are killed by a bomb planted by a domestic terrorist in a deliberate ambush, with a plaque subsequently being placed in the SRU to her memory.

=== Amanda Luria ===
Dr. Amanda Luria (Ruth Marshall; season 1) briefly serves in the SRU as the unit's psychologist for part of season one, specializing in the psychology of subjects. Her absence for the remainder of the series was left unexplained.

== Supporting characters ==
=== Sophie Lane ===
Sophie Lane (Janaya Stephens) is Ed's wife of nearly two decades. A caterer by profession, she initially plays the role of a supportive spouse despite obvious growing frustration with both his profession and the strain it puts on their marriage. The longstanding tension in the marriage caused by Ed's frequent decision to choose his SRU 'family' over his domestic one comes to a head during season three when she falls pregnant for a second time. Eventually growing tired of his continued absence and broken promises, she temporarily leaves him for the duration of the pregnancy and takes their son Clark with her before issuing an ultimatum that he has to choose between staying with the SRU or his marriage.

At the end of season three Sophie goes into labor, during which her condition rapidly deteriorates and she is forced to undergo an emergency c-section due to fetal distress. When Ed is shot while attempting to reach them in an apparent road rage incident but chooses to forego treatment to be with her, the two reconcile. When Ed intends to follow through on the ultimatum and leave the SRU, Sophie stops him and instead allows him to remain with the SRU in exchange for him reprioritising his home life over his work one as well as playing a more active role in taking care of their newborn daughter so that she can also work. Following this their relationship remains on far better terms for the rest of the series' run.

=== Clark Lane ===
The son of Ed and Sophie, Clark Lane (Tyler Stentiford) is initially shown to be a relatively happy teenager, well-versed with the Cello. As time goes on though it becomes clear his relationship with his father is increasingly strained due to their differing personalities, as well as Ed's overprotectiveness at times. This comes into greater focus during season five as Ed struggles with trauma related to the events of "Broken Peace", which Clark is aware of despite Ed's attempts to hide it. Despite this however it is clear that Clark looks up to his father, to the point that he desires to also join the police which he does in a deleted scene at the finale's conclusion alongside Dean Parker.

=== Dean Parker ===
The formerly-estranged son of Sgt. Greg Parker, Dean Parker (Jack Knight) was 6 years old when his mother left his father due to his alcoholism and moved to Dallas, Texas. In season 3, Dean and his father began to reconnect during a visit to Toronto, with Dean eventually moving back to Toronto to live with his father during season four. Dean also quickly resurrects his previous friendship with Clark Lane, with the two frequently hanging out together. Despite being accepted into a good college, Dean announced his intention to follow in his father's footsteps and apply to join the police, which causes brief friction between the two until they strike an apparent compromise where Dean will complete college first. During season five, wanting to see Team One in action, Dean requests and is taken on a ride-along with a less than enthused Clark which sees both of them come face to face with those in law enforcement who go by the book and those who don't. This fails to dampen his enthusiasm, subsequently joining the force alongside Clark by the end of the series.

=== Natalie Braddock ===
Sam's surviving sister, Natalie "Nat" Braddock (Rachel Skarsten) appears recurringly during the events of season four. She and Spike briefly dated during season four after she takes a shine to him, however he subsequently ends the relationship for fear of it affecting his friendship with Sam. More carefree to her brother's chagrin, her past comes back to haunt her after a former boyfriend and drug smuggler kidnaps her to exploit her relationship with Spike to attempt to force him to rob an evidence depot. After they are rescued by Team One she apologises before saying goodbye to Spike, though the two remain friends.

=== Kira Marlowe ===
Constable Kira Marlowe (Pascale Hutton) serves as the team's main SRU dispatcher during season one and the start of season two. Despite her current role she is shown to be ambitious and wanting to advance further in her career in law enforcement, gaining Greg's approval to attend more extensive training than necessary for a dispatcher, though her departure is unexplained. During the events of "Haunting the Barn" she is briefly taken hostage by a former SRU officer but manages to covertly alert Team One to the threat.
