= Sonya Salomaa =

Canadian actress

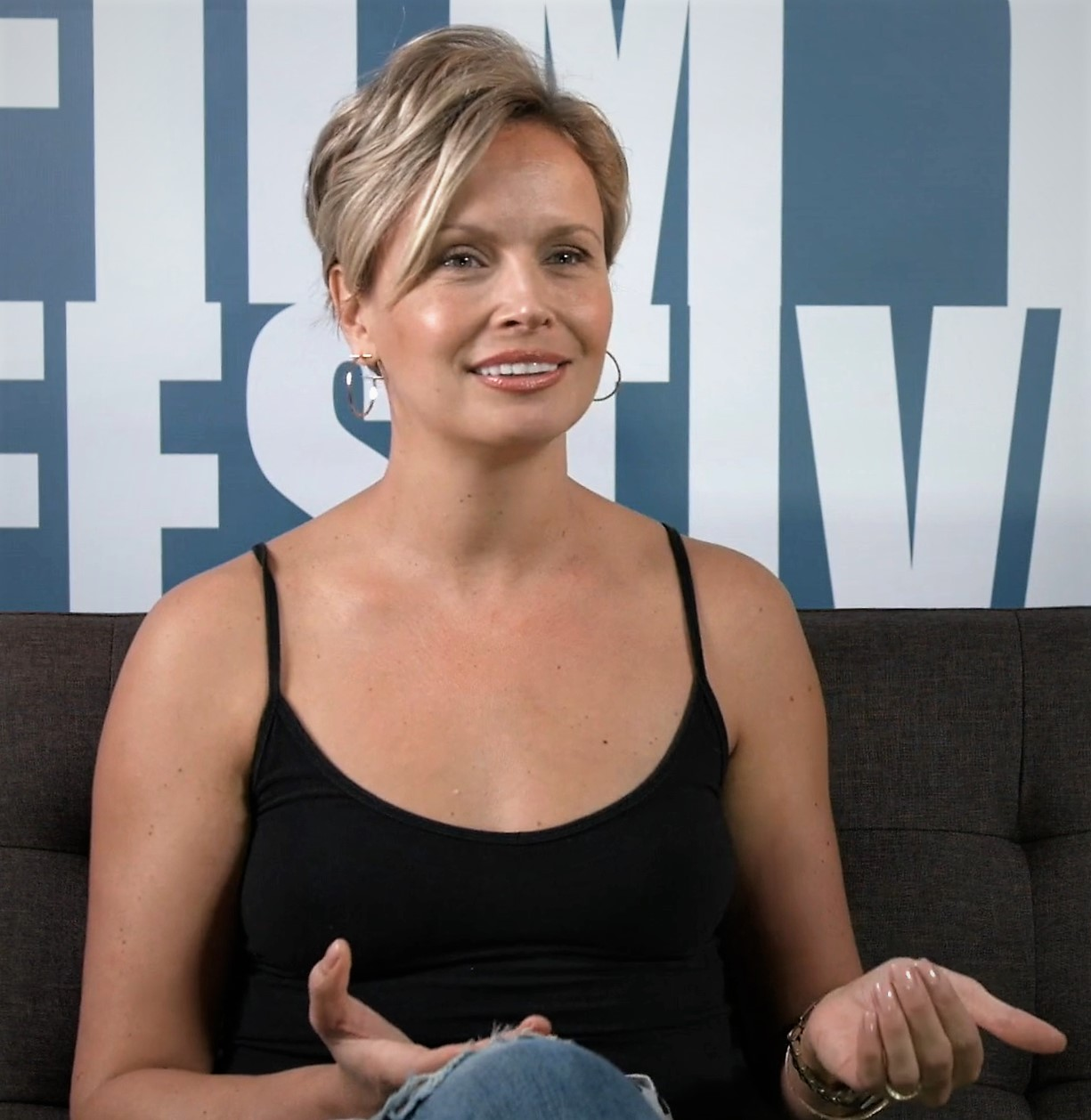
- Salomaa at the Carmel International Film Festival in 2016
- Born: 1974 (age 51–52); Sudbury, Ontario, Canada
- Occupation: Actress
- Years active: 2000–present
- Spouse: Warren Christie (m. 2007)
- Children: 1

Sonya Salomaa (born 1974) is a Canadian actress, known for her performances in The Collector and Durham County.

== Early life ==
She was born in Sudbury, Ontario. Salomaa grew up in Prince George, British Columbia and attended the University of Northern British Columbia to pursue a Bachelor of Science in Forestry. In her last summer break, she went to Victoria to sing and play the guitar. While in Victoria she became interested in acting.

== Career ==
Salomaa, a Finnish Canadian, first appeared on screen in 2000. In 2005 she took over the role of Maya Kandinski from Carly Pope in the Canadian supernatural drama series, The Collector. She won Leo Awards two years running for Best Actress in a Supporting Role. This was followed by a season in Durham County (2007) and received a Leo nomination for her role as Traci Prager. In 2008, Salomaa again took over a role—this time from Claudette Mink—of the character Laura Nelson, a member of the coast guard in The Guard. She has also guest starred in several TV shows including Supernatural, Covert Affairs and Flashpoint. She was one of the presenters for the 2010 Leo Awards.

She has also performed in numerous films including the 2006 comedy, The Tooth Fairy, Shannen Doherty's Christmas Caper (2007) and 2009's Malibu Shark Attack. Salomaa starred as a wannabe singer coming to terms with not following her dreams in the 2006 Canadian drama Black Eyed Dog and was the antagonist of Ties That Bind opposite Brian Krause and Nicole De Boer.

== Personal life ==
She now lives in Vancouver and is married to Warren Christie. They have one son. She is a certified herbalist.

== Filmography ==
Film
| Year | Title | Role | Notes |
|---|---|---|---|
| 2003 | House of the Dead | Cynthia | |
| 2003 | National Lampoon's Barely Legal | Cocktail Waitress | |
| 2003 | Firefight | Rachel | |
| 2004 | MXP: Most Xtreme Primate | Blonde | Video |
| 2005 | Fatal Reunion | Lynne | Video |
| 2005 | Thralls | Lean | |
| 2006 | Hollow Man 2 | Trophy Wife | Video |
| 2006 | Black Eyed Dog | Betty | |
| 2006 | The Tooth Fairy | Cherise | Video |
| 2008 | Odysseus and the Isle of the Mists | Athena | |
| 2009 | Watchmen | Adrian Veidt's Assistant | |
| 2009 | Malibu Shark Attack | Barb | |
| 2013 | Bent | Jackie | Short film |
| 2014 | Cut Bank | Gretchen | |
| 2016 | The Space Between | Jackie | |

Television
| Year | Title | Role | Notes |
|---|---|---|---|
| 2000 | 2gether | Reporter (uncredited) | TV movie |
| 2000 | 2gether: The Series | Reporter | Episode: "Awesomeness" |
| 2001 | Los Luchadores | Whelpette | Episode: "A Good Whelp Is Hard to Find"; Episode: "Puppy Love" |
| 2001 | Pasadena | Woman #1 | Episode: "Henry's Secret" |
| 2001 | Special Unit 2 | Waitress | Episode: "The Rocks" |
| 2001 | Dark Angel | Lux | Episode: "Two"; Episode: "Some Assembly Required" |
| 2002 | Croon | Cheryl | TV movie |
| 2002 | UC: Undercover | Jerri | Episode: "Teddy C" |
| 2002 | Glory Days | Rosalind | Episode: "The Lost Girls" |
| 2002 | Andromeda | Uxulta | Episode: "The Fair Unknown" |
| 2003 | Andromeda | Aurelia | Episode: "Soon the Nearing Vortex" |
| 2003 | 1st to Die | Melanie Brandt | TV movie |
| 2003 | Just Cause | Chris' Girlfriend | Episode: "Lies, Speculation & Deception" |
| 2003 | Dead Like Me | Sandy | Episode: "Rest in Peace" |
| 2005 | The L Word | Emma | Episode: "L'Chaim" |
| 2005 | A Lover's Revenge | Ashley | TV movie |
| 2005-2006 | The Collector | Maya Kandinski | 21 episodes |
| 2005-2006 | Stargate SG-1 | Charlotte Mayfield / Athena | 2 episodes |
| 2006 | Ties That Bind | Courtney Allison | TV movie |
| 2006 | The Stranger Game | Ellie Glassman | TV movie |
| 2006 | Kyle XY | Allison | Episode: "The Lies That Bind" |
| 2006 | Saved | Ellen | Episode: "Family" |
| 2006 | All She Wants for Christmas | Ashley Aikens | TV movie |
| 2007 | Painkiller Jane | Jennifer Towne | Episode: "The Healer" |
| 2007 | Christmas Caper | Savannah Cooper | TV movie |
| 2007-2008 | Flash Gordon | Lenu | 4 episodes |
| 2007-2009 | Durham County | Traci Prager | 7 episodes |
| 2008 | About a Girl | Ms. Martin | Episode: "About an All-Niter" |
| 2008 | A Teacher's Crime | Shannon | TV movie |
| 2008-2009 | The Guard | Laura Nelson | 15 episodes |
| 2009 | Malibu Shark Attack | Barb | TV movie |
| 2010 | V | Mary | Episode: "Heretic's Fork" |
| 2010 | Canadian Comedy Shorts | Prostitute | Episode: "Holy War Dance Party" |
| 2011 | Endgame | Sophie McGray | Episode: "Gorillas in our Midst" |
| 2011 | The Haunting Hour: The Series | Mom | Episode: "The Perfect Brother" |
| 2011 | Supernatural | Rachel | Episode: "Frontierland"; Episode: "The Man Who Would Be King" |
| 2011 | Covert Affairs | Megan Wilkons | Episode: "Welcome to the Occupation" |
| 2011 | Flashpoint | Marina Levin | 4 episodes |
| 2012 | Republic of Doyle | Janel | Episode: "Identity Crisis" |
| 2012 | Secrets of Eden | Alice | TV movie |
| 2012 | Broken Trust | Michelle Sarnowsky | TV movie |
| 2013 | The Killing | Annie Becker | Episodes Season 3 |

== Awards and nominations ==
| Year | Award | Category | Work | Result | Ref |
|---|---|---|---|---|---|
| 2005 | Leo Awards | Best Supporting Performance by a Female in a Dramatic Series | The Collector | Won | |
| 2006 | Leo Awards | Best Supporting Performance by a Female in a Dramatic Series | The Collector | Won | |
| 2008 | Leo Awards | Best Supporting Performance by a Female in a Dramatic Series | Durham County | Nominated | |
| 2008 | Gemini Awards | Best Performance by an Actress in a Featured Supporting Role in a Dramatic Series | Durham County | Nominated | |
| 2017 | Leo Awards | Best Lead Performance by a Female in a Motion Picture | The Space Between | Nominated | |
