= He Never Died =

2015 comedy horror film

- Directed by: Jason Krawczyk
- Written by: Jason Krawczyk
- Produced by: Zach Hagen; Adrienne Stern
- Starring: Henry Rollins; Booboo Stewart; Steven Ogg; Jordan Todosey; Kate Greenhouse
- Cinematography: Eric Billman
- Edited by: James Bredin
- Music by: James Mark Stewart
- Production companies: 108 Media; Alternate Ending Studios
- Release dates: December 18, 2015 (SXSW); March 18, 2016
- Running time: 99 minutes
- Countries: United States; Canada
- Language: English

He Never Died is a 2015 Canadian/American horror comedy film that was written and directed by Jason Krawczyk. It had its world premiere on March 17, 2015 at South by Southwest and stars Henry Rollins as Jack, an immortal, cannibalistic loner who has withdrawn from society to protect both himself and others. Plans were announced to create a direct sequel and miniseries expansion following the character Jack. The script for this was later rewritten to create the 2019 film She Never Died.

Filming for He Never Died began in November 2013 in Toronto and concluded in December of the same year. The film was released on various video on demand platforms as well as on DVD and became available worldwide on Netflix on March 18, 2016.

== Plot ==
Jack has developed a routine for his life that he follows in order to repress his urge to engage in vampiric cannibalism. He spends most of his time sleeping in his apartment and avoids human contact other than regular trips to a local diner, mass at a nearby church, bingo games, and to the hospital, where he purchases donated blood from a hospital intern, Jeremy. Upon returning home from one trip, Jack is confronted by mobsters Steve and Short, who are looking for Jeremy.

Jack's routine is further interrupted by a phone call from his ex-girlfriend, Gillian, asking him to find their adult daughter, Andrea, who tried to contact him earlier that day. Unhappy, Jack agrees to locate Andrea, but stresses that he wants no further contact with Gillian. He finds Andrea and takes her with him to the diner he frequents, where she meets Cara, a waitress with a crush on Jack. While Jack slowly bonds with Andrea he sees visions of an old man with a goatee, wearing a porkpie hat, and also manages to foil Steve and Short's attempt to kidnap Jeremy. Jack is surprised when he discovers that Andrea can also see the man, as previously only Jack could see him.

Out for vengeance, Short and Steve try to murder Jack, only for Jack to kill Short by tearing out his throat with his bare hands, which he then eats, giving in to his craving for human flesh. Afraid that he'll do the same to Andrea, Jack forces her to leave the apartment. Shortly afterwards Jack kills and eats an obnoxious neighbor. Later, he walks around the city trying to pick fights with various strangers, all of whom refuse to reciprocate his aggression. Eventually, he comes across three young men spoiling for a fight, culminating in him killing one or more of them. Jack ultimately receives a phone call from the mobsters, who inform him that they have killed Gillian and kidnapped Andrea and will kill her if he does not surrender. Jack tries to confront Alex, a local crime boss, and the man he believes is responsible, only for Alex to deny that he had anything to do with the kidnapping.

Upset, Jack goes to the diner, where he bribes Cara into helping him save Andrea by offering her a million dollars. After seeing Jack survive several mortal wounds with little apparent issue as well as his trove of historical artifacts, Andrea is forced to accept that Jack is actually the Biblical figure Cay'in (Cain). Jack ultimately discovers the reason why the mobsters were after Jeremy: he had borrowed a large sum of money to pay off his student loans, without repaying it. He also learns of Andrea's whereabouts and goes to rescue her. Alex reveals that he kidnapped Andrea as revenge for Jack killing Alex's father, a mobster Jack once worked for. Just as Jack is about to murder Alex, the man with the goatee arrives, prompting Jack to angrily confront him over his many previous murders. Jack demands to know why the man won't let him die. Jack ends up choosing to spare Alex in favor of helping Andrea seek medical attention. Before leaving with Cara and Andrea, Jack promises Alex that one day he will see the goateed man. After they have left, the goateed man appears to the badly injured Alex, greeting him with a resonant otherworldly-sounding voice.

== Cast ==
- Henry Rollins as Jack / Cay'in (Cain) / Vlad the Impaler
- Booboo Stewart as Jeremy
- Steven Ogg as Alex
- Jordan Todosey as Andrea K. Huntsman
- Kate Greenhouse as Cara
- James Cade as Short
- Michael Cram as Tim
- David Richmond-Peck as Steve
- Elias Edraki as Ben
- Walter Alza as Derrick
- Don Francks as The Man with the Goatee
- Aron Tager as an announcer
- Mary Elaina Brisebois as Gillian Huntsman (voice)

== Sequels/remake ==
In October 2014 it was announced that 108 Media were shopping the rights for a miniseries version of He Never Died, which would further expand the film's story and history of the central character Jack. Director Krawczyk was set to return as the director for the miniseries and Rollins would have returned to portray his character Jack. A direct sequel was also intended to have been created, however plans for this fell through.

Krawczyk rewrote his script and Jack's character to be a female loner in a similar situation, setting the film within the same universe as He Never Died. In April 2019 the film She Never Died, which was directed by Audrey Cummings and starred Oluniké Adeliyi. Krawczyk has described the film as a remake of He Never Died while critics have referred to it as a sister sequel, generally praising both the film and Adeliyi.

== Reception ==
=== Critical response ===
On the review aggregator website Rotten Tomatoes, 88% of 17 critics' reviews are positive, with an average rating of 6.8/10. Metacritic, which uses a weighted average, assigned the film a score of 72 out of 100, based on 6 critics, indicating "generally favorable" reviews.

Fangoria Film School Rejects and Dread Central all wrote positive reviews for the film. Fangoria's Michael Gingold praised Rollins' "deadpan humor" but said that the plot lacked surprises. Film School Rejects wrote that the movie is "laugh out loud funny thanks almost exclusively to Rollins’ delivery and reaction shots, but the acts of violence and character details are just as entertaining."

== Soundtrack ==
- He's Got The Whole World In His Hands by Charlie Kim
- (If) You Want Trouble by Nick Waterhouse
- Hate In My Heart by Inger Lorre & the chiefs of infinity
- Quiet Man by Judy Klass Band (demo song) recently cut by Mary Resek
- Melancholy Man by The Moody Blues
- Sellout by Sri
- I'm Gonna Count My Sheep by Missouri Jazz Band (uncredited song during Bingo scene)
