= Michael Cram =

Canadian actor and singer-songwriter

- Born: July 11, 1968 (age 57); Cornwall, Ontario, Canada
- Occupations: Actor, singer-songwriter

Michael Cram (born July 11, 1968) is a Canadian actor and singer-songwriter.

== Early life ==
He grew up in Ottawa, Ontario, and attended Hillcrest High School before studying economics at Carleton University. He then studied theatre at The Center For Actor Study in Toronto. He has also lived and worked in Toronto as well as Vancouver and Los Angeles. Cram lives with his wife, an information architect, in Los Angeles. Michael Cram has a younger brother, Bruce, who is a real-estate agent and lives in Toronto with his wife and two kids.

== Career ==
=== Music career ===
Cram has been a member of Redchair, Amsterdam and Cold House. On November 6, 2011, he played a gig with his former Flashpoint co-star Amy Jo Johnson at the Free Times Cafe in Toronto.

=== Acting career ===
He is best known for his role as Kevin "Wordy" Wordsworth in the hit television series Flashpoint and Tim in the drama-comedy-horror film He Never Died.

== Filmography ==
=== Film ===
Year	Title	Role	Notes
1995	Tommy Boy	Frat Boy	
2009	Defendor	Blake	
2010	Repo Men	Father	
2013	Empire of Dirt	Doc Baker	
2013	Bent	Mitch	Short film
2015	He Never Died	Tim	
2016	Miss Sloane	Frank McGill	
2016	The Space Between	Mitch	
2018	Every Day	Nick	
2023	To Catch a Killer	Gavin	

=== Television ===
Year	Title	Role	Notes
1995	Mixed Blessings	Edward	Made-for-TV movie
1996	The X-Files	Officer Corning	Season 4 Episode 4: "Unruhe"
2004	Sue Thomas: F.B.Eye	Ben Myers	Season 2 Episode 16
2007	Stargate Atlantis	Silas	Season 4 Episode 5 – Travelers
2008	Flashpoint	Kevin "Wordy" James Wordsworth	Series Regular
2013	Rookie Blue	Kevin Ford	4 episodes
2013	The Listener	Brent Sanders	Episode:"The Illustrated Woman"
2014	Covert Affairs	Harris Wilson / The Postman	Guest Star
2015	Arrow	Malcolm's Friend	Guest Star "Uprising"
2015	Bones	Ted Thompson	Season 10 Episode 20
2016	NCIS	Agent Earl Kitt, ATF	Guest Star "Loose Cannons"
2016	Shadowhunters	Detective Fisk	2 episodes "Major Arcana"
2017	The Girlfriend Experience	Mark Novak	4 episodes
2018	General Hospital	Carter Buckley	1 episode
2018	NCIS: Los Angeles	Col. Trevor Lawford	episode: "The Patton Project"
