= Audrey Cummings =

Canadian director, screenwriter, and producer

- Citizenship: Canadian
- Occupation: Filmmaker
- Website: https://audreycummings.com/

Audrey Cummings is a Canadian director, screenwriter, and producer.

A graduate of the Canadian Film Centre's Director's Lab, she became the first woman to win Best Director at Shriekfest Los Angeles with her debut horror feature film Berkshire County (2014). Feature films she has directed include Darken (2017), She Never Died (2019), and Place of Bones (2023). Cummings is known for directing genre feature films with strong female protagonists, discussing in interviews that these films have large female fan bases and that it is important to create stories that resonate with women. Cummings has also directed episodes of the television series Ginny & Georgia and My Life with the Walter Boys.

Cummings's short film Burgeon and Fade won the Jackson-Triggs Award for Best Emerging Canadian Filmmaker at the WorldWide Short Film Festival.
