= Veritas, Prince of Truth =

- Directed by: Arturo Ruiz-Esparza
- Written by: Billie Letts; Deborah Ruiz-Esparza
- Produced by: Valentino Lanus; Estrella Medina; Arturo Ruiz-Esparza; Deborah Ruiz-Esparza
- Starring: Sean Patrick Flanery; Bret Loehr; Amy Jo Johnson; Tyler Posey; Kate Walsh; Danny Strong
- Cinematography: Arturo de la Rosa
- Edited by: Todd Jenkins
- Music by: John Massari
- Distributed by: Vivendi Entertainment; Lightyear Entertainment
- Release date: April 19, 2007 (AFI Dallas)
- Running time: 93 minutes
- Countries: United States; Mexico
- Language: English

Veritas, Prince of Truth is a 2007 animated romance fantasy film directed by Arturo Ruiz-Esparza and starring Sean Patrick Flanery, Bret Loehr, Amy Jo Johnson, Tyler Posey, Kate Walsh, and Danny Strong.

== Premise ==
A young boy must battle an evil menace that could destroy the Earth when Veritas, his favorite comic book hero, comes to life and seeks his help.

== Characters ==
| Actor | Character | Description |
|---|---|---|
| Sean Patrick Flanery | Veritas/Harvey Wilkins | Veritas The main hero from a comic book. Harvey The creator of the Veritas comics. |
| Bret Loehr | Kern Williams | The young boy who Veritas asks for help from. |
| Amy Jo Johnson | Marty Williams | Kern's loving mum and animal rescuer. |
| Tyler Posey | Mouse Gonzalez | Best friend to Kern and Veritas fan. |
| Kate Walsh | Nemesii | The Main nemesis to Veritas. |
| Danny Strong | Raymond Wilkins | Brother to Harvey Wilkins. |
| Anthony Zerbe | Porterfield | CEO of Vision Comics. Distributor of the Veritas Comics. |
| Arath de la Torre | Danny | |
| Carmen Salinas | Elva Maria | |
