= Magma: Volcanic Disaster =

- Genre: Action
- Screenplay by: Rebecca Rian
- Directed by: Ian Gilmour
- Starring: Xander Berkeley; Amy Jo Johnson; David O'Donnell; George R. Sheffey; Michael Durrell
- Music by: Nathan Furst
- Country of origin: United States
- Original language: English

Production
- Executive producers: Thomas Becker; Sven Clement; Jörg Westerkamp
- Producers: Jeff Beach; Michael Braun; Phillip J. Roth; T.J. Sakasegawa; John Cappilla
- Cinematography: Lorenzo Senatore
- Editor: John Quinn
- Running time: 87 minutes
- Production companies: ApolloScreen Filmproduktion GmbH & Co. Filmproduktion KG; Magma Productions

Original release
- Network: Sci-Fi Channel
- Release: January 21, 2006

Magma: Volcanic Disaster is a 2006 disaster film by Sci Fi Pictures. Written by Rebecca Rian and directed by Ian Gilmour, the film stars Xander Berkeley and Amy Jo Johnson. It was filmed in Bulgaria.

== Plot ==
The Trollsvotin volcano in Iceland violently erupts and kills a USGS survey team. Volcanologist professor Dr. Peter Shepherd takes four of his graduate students to study Grímsvötn, a dormant volcano. It also erupts suddenly, but the group is able to escape. While escaping by helicopter, Brianna Chapman witnesses Grímsvötn producing pyroclastic surges, an unusual amount of ash, and extremely runny lava. Meanwhile, Shepherd visits Dr. Oscar Vallian, a wheelchair-using volcanologist who recently quit working for the USGS. Vallian has formulated the Exodus theory, where he explains that all of the Earth's volcanoes could erupt within a short period of time. Vallian leaves for Honshu, Japan to be on the front lines when Mount Fuji erupts.

Shepherd travels to Washington, D.C., to explain the Exodus theory. Dr. William Kincaid, the head of the USGS, is tasked to review Shepherd's data. He promises the President's representative, Stephen Daugherty, to disprove the theory. Shepherd returns to his students to explain that the government will not act unless they get proof.

Natalie, a Park Ranger, arrives at work at Yellowstone National Park to be told that Old Faithful has seen no activity. The next day, Fuji erupts, destroying much of the island of Honshu and triggering large tsunamis. Vallian and his companion, Melanie, are killed by a pyroclastic surge. That night, Shepherd mourns Vallian's death, and dwells on the end of his and Natalie's marriage. Shepherd's student Brianna comforts and offers him advice.

In the morning, the news reports that Mount Kilimanjaro has erupted. The group heads to Pasto, Colombia to investigate a mine site, where they learn it has been shut down after some miners were killed by flowing liquid "fire" from the earth. The group ends up in the mine's attached lava tubes. Sudden tremors strike the mine, causing magma to fall from the ceiling. One student, Jacques, is killed by flowing lava, while another, CJ, is severely burned.

The news reports that Mount Vesuvius and Mount Etna have erupted, destroying most of Italy. Kai tells Dr. Shepherd that the samples from the Colombian mine were of the same composition as iron. Kai also notifies Shepherd that someone has hacked into their server. Kincaid admits to stealing the data and plans to present the findings to Washington as his own. Shepherd and his group interrupt Kincaid's presentation and present additional evidence he has not managed to steal. Dr. Shepherd explains the Exodus theory to the President, as well as his plan to control the Earth's pressure by using nuclear warheads at strategic points within oceanic faults.

After the meeting, Shepherd calls Natalie and demands that she leave Yellowstone National Park as the Old Faithful geyser has shown signs of volcanic activity, though Natalie is skeptical. Daugherty calls Shepherd to notify him that the President has approved their plan, and that Shepherd and one of the students will work with the naval fleets from the Hyperion and the Reprisal. Brianna is left at the USGS as the go-between. Shepherd boards the Hyperion in the Pacific Rim, while Kai boards the Reprisal in the Atlantic. In the morning, Natalie starts packing up her campground while another Ranger and some scientists examine Old Faithful. The Hyperion gets bounced around by volcanic activity in the Marina Trench.

Natalie arrives at the next set of campgrounds, only to find an eruption already taking place, and flees. The Hyperion and the Reprisal suffer heavy damage from falling debris, but are able to fire their first rounds of torpedoes. Shepherd loses contact with Kai while the Hyperion continues to strike its remaining targets. Natalie attempts to flee Yellowstone as geysers start spewing molten magma, killing multiple park visitors. The President delivers a speech, where he states that 22 countries will be firing nuclear-tipped torpedoes underwater to control the Earth's magma flow. As Shepherd prays for his wife, the lava flow at Yellowstone stops just before reaching Natalie and a large group of visitors. The Reprisal sinks, killing its crew and Kai. The Hyperion fires the last of its torpedoes and is able to stabilize. The plan succeeds, and the world's volcanoes return to normal. Shepherd turns down a position as head of the USGS and reconciles with his wife.

== Cast ==
- Xander Berkeley as Dr. Peter Shepherd
- Amy Jo Johnson as Brianna Chapman
- David O'Donnell as C.J.
- George R. Sheffey as Dr. William Kincaid
- Michael Durrell as President Fletcher
- Reiko Aylesworth as Natalie Shepherd
- Vlado Mihailov as Kai Senakoia
- Rushi Vidinliev as Jacques
- Valentin Ganev as Oskar Valenteen
- Asen Blatechki as Holloway
- Scott Owens as Harvey "Harv"
- Jonas Talkington as Stephen Daugherty
- Ryan Spike Dauner as O'Neil
- Dessi Morales as Melanie

== Critical reception ==
Scott Weinberg of DVD Talk wrote that the film "is as pre-fabricated and ultra-conventional as you could ever imagine"; he found the dialogue unbelievable, the direction poor, the plot to be unimaginative, and the effects to be "kistchy at best, hilariously inept otherwise". He summarized by writing: "If you rent these flicks for the goofiness, this one's worthy of a rental." David Johnson of DVD Verdict found the special effects to be unconvincing, noting that "any time there's lava onscreen, the film stumbles." He poked fun at the "talkiness of the plot", but found the acting to be "decent enough to make the cataclysm sound halfway believable". Opining that as he might have been able to find the film acceptable otherwise, "a batch of putrid CGI would find its way onto the screen, and the taste soured". Ben Rhudy of Monsters and Critics found the pacing to be slow and the film to be clichéd, offering that the film "is yet another prime example of a promising premise marred by a cable TV budget". He noted the DVD release included an awful theatrical trailer that "surpasses the film it represents in both pacing and excitement".
