= Malibu Shark Attack =

- Movie poster
- Genre: Drama; Horror; Thriller
- Written by: Keith Shaw
- Directed by: David Lister
- Starring: Warren Christie; Peta Wilson; Chelan Simmons; Sonya Salomaa
- Theme music composer: Michael Neilson
- Countries of origin: Canada; Australia
- Original language: English

Production
- Producers: Dale G. Bradley; Grant Bradley; Richard Stewart; Brian Trenchard-Smith
- Cinematography: Brian J. Breheny
- Editor: Asim Nuraney
- Running time: 86 minutes
- Production companies: Insight Film Studios; Limelight International Media Entertainment
- Budget: $3,000,000 (estimated)

Original release
- Network: Syfy
- Release: July 25, 2009

Malibu Shark Attack (also known as Mega Shark in Malibu) is a 2009 TV film, directed by David Lister and produced for the Syfy channel. It is the nineteenth film in the Maneater film series. The film was released on DVD on August 16, 2011.

Shot on location on Australia's Gold Coast at Currumbin beach and Elephant Rock, the film received mostly negative reviews from critics.

== Plot ==
Heather is a lifeguard on a Malibu beach, alongside her ex-boyfriend Chavez (the head-lifeguard) and fellow lifeguards Doug, and Barb. Also on the beach are Jenny, a young 20-something girl who is reluctantly cleaning the beach for community service after she got caught shoplifting, and Bryan, Barb's boyfriend who proposes to her. Meanwhile, a tremor unleashes a group of Living fossil goblin sharks who begin to devour swimmers along the beach. Chavez travels to a nearby building that is undergoing construction after there are complaints about a public parking area closure and meets with Colin, who is Heather's new boyfriend and the building's owner, and workers George, Yancey and Karl. A warning of a tsunami arises and Chavez returns to the beach, saving Heather who had been knocked into the water by a shark after being sent to investigate some people causing trouble on the water. Doug and Barb evacuate the beach, and take shelter in the lifeguard hut with Heather, Chavez, Jenny and Bryan.

As the tsunami hits, Bryan is knocked unconscious and Jenny suffers a large cut on her leg. Bryan quickly recovers and Heather manages to stitch Jenny's cut together; however, the blood attracts the goblin sharks, and the group realize they are stranded in the hut, with help unlikely soon due to the damage the tsunami has created. The sharks soon begin to attack the hut and manage to break the floor, dragging Barb out and devouring her. As the group mourn Barb's death, the construction crew have become stranded in the building where they were working. Yancey decides to try to swim to land and get help; however, she is quickly attacked and eaten by sharks. Then a shark jumps up and drags Karl into the water. Soon after, Colin and George discover a boat and begin to travel to the hut. Back at the lifeguard shack, the group manage to kill one of the sharks, and Chavez swims out of the hut to retrieve a flare gun and any other supplies he can salvage. The others attempt to distract the sharks, but one attempts to eat Chavez after he climbs to the shack's roof, resulting in him shooting and killing the shark with the flare gun, instead of summoning help.

The group move up to the roof as the sharks continue to damage the hut. Colin and George arrive on the boat and everyone boards, but the fuel soon runs out, forcing them to drift to land. After a few hours, the boat reaches Colin's worksite. The boat becomes stuck on a gate, so George enters the site to try to find pliers to open the gate. As the rest wait, sharks arrive. Bryan jumps into the water, sacrificing himself so the rest can escape. Doug, Jenny and Colin manage to get into the flooded building and encounter a shark but manage to kill it, while Heather and Chavez discover a half eaten George, before taking shelter in a car, where they reconcile. Chavez kills another shark, before entering the building with Heather. The group meet up, and manage to trap and kill the final shark. After reaching the dry second floor of the building, Jenny says she'd like to be a lifeguard and Doug says they can start her training with her twenty remaining community service hours; the two smile at each other. It's also made clear that although Heather mentions sharing and flipping a coin, Chavez will win her back. The last scene shows a helicopter arriving to rescue the survivors.

== Cast ==
- Peta Wilson as Heather
- Warren Christie as Chavez
- Remi Broadway as Doug Crenshaw
- Chelan Simmons as Jenny
- Sonya Salomaa as Barbara "Barb" Simmons
- Nicolas G. Cooper as Bryan Conroy
- Jeff Gannon as Colin Smith
- Mungo McKay as George
- Evert McQueen as Karl
- Renee Bowen as Yancey
