= Warren Christie =

British and Canadian actor (born 1975)

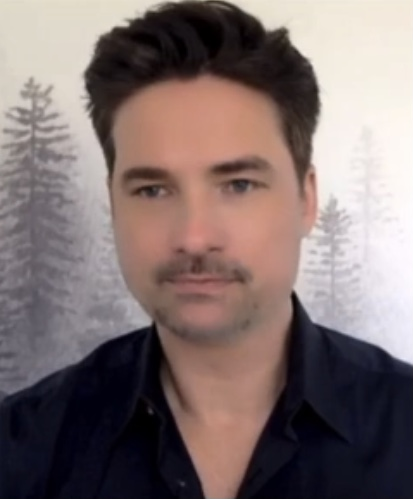
- Christie in Gone Mom (2021)
- Born: Hans Warren Christie; 4 November 1975 (age 51); Belfast, Northern Ireland
- Citizenship: United Kingdom; Canada
- Education: University of Windsor
- Years active: 2001–present
- Spouse: Sonya Salomaa (m. 2007)
- Children: 1

Hans Warren Christie (born 4 November 1975) is a British and Canadian television and film actor known for his roles as Ray Cataldo on the ABC drama October Road and as Aidan "Greggy" Stiviletto on the ABC series Happy Town. More recently, Christie starred as Cameron Hicks in the SyFy series Alphas.

He recurred on the Fox series The Resident and costarred on the 2019 NBC series The Village. He also appeared in Batwoman as Bruce Wayne / Batman / Tommy Elliott / Hush. He currently portrays Mr. Edwards on the Netflix series Little House on the Prairie.

== Background ==
Warren Christie was born in Belfast, Northern Ireland and spent most of his childhood in London, Ontario. He left London for the University of Windsor after being recruited to play college football. It was during his years at Windsor that Christie developed an interest in performing and decided to pursue it as a career. This led to a move to Vancouver, where he soon found acting opportunities. He now lives in Vancouver, married to actress Sonya Salomaa. They have one son.

== Career ==
In 2007, Christie landed a lead role on the series October Road, playing a cocky construction company owner. In the same year, he was cast as the star of the musical feature film Magic Flute Diaries, based on one of Mozart's operas. In 2008, Christie was involved in an ABC pilot, Prince of Motor City, a gothic family drama in which he stars alongside Aiden Quinn and Piper Perabo.

Christie has taken on a variety of roles in different genres. He played opposite Heather Graham in the romantic comedy Gray Matters, and then appeared in the psychological thriller Beneath, produced by the group that made Napoleon Dynamite in conjunction with MTV Films/Paramount Classics.

Christie has also been involved in numerous television shows, including the unsuccessful ABC series The Days, and guest appearances in Supernatural, The L Word and Battlestar Galactica, before gaining more consistent work. He starred as Cameron Hicks on Syfy's series, Alphas.

In May 2020, it was revealed during the season one finale of Batwoman, that Christie had been cast as Bruce Wayne, when he portrayed Tommy Elliot disguised as Wayne. This marks Christie as the second actor to portray the character within the Arrowverse alongside Kevin Conroy who played an alternate Earth version of the character during the Crisis on Infinite Earths event.

Christie joined the cast of the Netflix series Little House on the Prairie in 2025, playing the role of John Edwards.

== Filmography ==
Film
Year	Title	Role	Notes
2004	The Thing Below	Cassidy	Video
2006	Gray Matters	Trevor Brown	
2007	Dress to Kill	Tom Hopkins	
2007	Beneath	Jeff	
2007	X's & O's	Lorenzo	
2008	The Most Wonderful Time of the Year	Morgan Derby	
2008	Incident at a Truckstop Diner	Father	Short film
2008	Magic Flute Diaries	Tom / Tamino	
2008	Bachelor Party 2: The Last Temptation	Todd	Video
2008	Bachelor Party 2: Analysis of a Stripper Fight	Todd	Video short
2011	Apollo 18	Ben Anderson	
2012	This Means War	Steve	

Television
Year	Title	Role	Notes
2001	Pasadena	Security Guard	Episode: "The Rat"
2003	The Twilight Zone	Devin	Episode: "The Path"
2003	1st to Die	Michael DeGraaff	TV movie
2003	Lucky 7	David	TV movie
2003	Black Sash	Zach	Episode: "The Prodigal Son"
2003	Jake 2.0	Steve Clemens	Episode: "Middleman"
2003–2004	Still Life	Gideon	5 episodes
2004	10.5	Jimmy	TV miniseries
2004	The Days	Lane Dugan	4 episodes
2005	Andromeda	Ione	Episode: "Moonlight Becomes You"
2005	The L Word	Leo Herrera	3 episodes
2005	Battlestar Galactica	Tarn	2 episodes
2006	Supernatural	Luther	Episode: "Dead Man's Blood"
2006	The Evidence	Phil Eugenides	Episode: "And the Envelope Please"
2006	Introducing Lennie Rose	Jackson Dean	TV movie
2007	My Baby Is Missing	Tom Robbins	TV movie
2007	Ghost Whisperer	Motorcycle Ghost	Episode: "The Collector"
2007	This Space for Rent	Chad	Episode: "Stain'd"
2007–2008	October Road	Ray 'Big Cat' Cataldo	19 episodes
2008	Samurai Girl	Dr. Thomas Fleming	2 episodes
2008	The Prince of Motor City	Jamie Hamilton	TV movie
2008	The Most Wonderful Time of the Year	Morgan Derby	TV movie
2009	House Rules	Nate Tiernan	TV movie
2009	Malibu Shark Attack	Chavez	TV movie
2010	Ties That Bind	Peter Wilson	TV movie
2010	Happy Town	Greggy Stiviletto	6 episodes
2010–2011	True Justice	Detective Landon Radner	13 episodes
2011	Flashpoint	Mark Logan	Episode: "Thicker Than Blood"
2011	Three Weeks, Three Kids	Will Johnson	TV movie
2011	Once Upon a Time	Ryan Marlow	Episode: "Pilot"
2011–2012	Alphas	Cameron Hicks	Main role
2012	Arrow	Carter Bowen	Episode: "Legacies"
2013	Castle	Brad Parker	Episode: "Dreamworld"
2014	Color of Rain	Michael Spehn	TV movie
2014	Motive	Sergeant Mark Cross	Main cast (seasons 2–3)
2014–2015	Girlfriends' Guide to Divorce	Will	Recurring role
2015	Chicago Fire	Scott Rice	Recurring (season 3); 7 episodes
2015	Zoo	Ray Endicott	2 episodes
2016	Eyewitness	Ryan Kane	Recurring role
2017	The Catch	Ethan Ward	Recurring role
2018	The Resident	Jude Silva	4 episodes
2019	The Village	Nick	Main cast
2020	If I Only Had Christmas	Glenn Goodman / William Austin	Hallmark Movie
2020–21	Batwoman	Tommy Elliot / Hush; Bruce Wayne	3 episodes
2021	Gone Mom: The Jennifer Dulos Story	Fotis Dulos	Lifetime TV film
2021	Crashing Through the Snow	Sam Reynolds	Hallmark movie
2023	The Watchful Eye	Matthew	Main cast
2023	The More Love Grows	Ben	Hallmark movie
2024	Our Holiday Story	Dave	Hallmark movie
2025	Home Turf	Logan	Hallmark Movie
2026	Little House on the Prairie	John Edwards	
