= Place of Bones =

2023 film by Audrey Cummings

- Release poster
- Directed by: Audrey Cummings
- Written by: Richard Taylor
- Produced by: David Lipper; Eric Gozlan; Robert A. Daly Jr.
- Starring: Heather Graham; Tom Hopper; Corin Nemec; Brielle Robillard; Cowboy Cerrone
- Cinematography: Andrzej Sekula
- Edited by: Michael P. Mason
- Music by: Jim McGrath
- Production companies: Highland Film Group; Gold Rush Entertainment; Latigo Films
- Distributed by: The Avenue
- Release dates: December 5, 2023 (Another Hole in the Head); August 23, 2024 (United States)
- Running time: 94 minutes
- Country: United States
- Language: English

Place of Bones is a 2023 American Western film directed by Audrey Cummings, written by Richard Taylor, and starring Heather Graham, Tom Hopper, Corin Nemec, Brielle Robillard and Cowboy Cerrone.

The film premiered at the 2023 Another Hole in the Head Film Festival, and was released in the United States on August 23, 2024, by The Avenue.

== Premise ==
In 1876, a mother and daughter living on a remote ranch fight for survival against a band of ruthless outlaws.

== Cast ==
- Heather Graham as Pandora
- Tom Hopper as Bear John
- Corin Nemec as Calhoun
- Brielle Robillard as Hester
- Donald 'Cowboy' Cerrone as Minor Wilson
- Gattlin Griffith as Jack
- Zachary Keller as Little Pete
- Ray Abruzzo as Lester
- David Lipper as Ed Singletary
- Jeanette Schock as Sadie
- Isabella Blake-Thomas as Lilith

== Production ==
In January 2023 it was announced that Eric Gozlan, David Lipper were producers for the film for Goldrush Entertainment and Robert A. Daly Jr. for Latigo Films. Audrey Cummings was to direct from a Richard Taylor script with Hopper and Graham in lead roles.

Principal photography wrapped in Los Angeles in February 2023.

== Release ==
Place of Bones premiered at the Another Hole in the Head Film Festival in San Francisco on December 5, 2023. The film was released in the United States in select theaters and video-on-demand by The Avenue on August 23, 2024.

== Reception ==
On the review aggregator website Rotten Tomatoes, 73% of 15 critics' reviews are positive, with an average rating of 6.1/10.
