= The Space Between (2016 Canadian film) =

2016 film by Amy Jo Johnson

- Film poster
- Directed by: Amy Jo Johnson
- Written by: Amy Jo Johnson
- Produced by: Jessica Adams; Amy Jo Johnson
- Starring: Amy Jo Johnson; Jayne Eastwood; Michael Ironside; Sonya Salomaa; Michael Cram; Julia Sarah Stone
- Cinematography: Kristin Fieldhouse
- Edited by: Monica Remba
- Music by: August Cinjun Tate
- Production companies: Ja Productions; Telefilm Canada; Talent Fund; NBC Universal Canada
- Release date: December 2016 (Whistler)
- Running time: 90 minutes
- Country: Canada
- Language: English

The Space Between is a 2016 Canadian film written and directed by Amy Jo Johnson. It stars Amy Jo Johnson, Jayne Eastwood, Michael Ironside, Sonya Salomaa, Michael Cram and Julia Sarah Stone.

== Premise ==
When a man discovers that his child is not his, he goes looking for answers and finding the biological father.

== Cast ==
- Amy Jo Johnson as Amelia
- Jayne Eastwood as Luella
- Michael Ironside as Nick
- Sonya Salomaa as Jackie
- Michael Cram as Mitch
- Julian Richings as Stash
- David Paetkau as Marcus
- Kristian Bruun as Teddy
- Julia Sarah Stone as Emily
- Kerri Smith as Martha

== Production ==
=== Development ===
The movie was financed by an Indiegogo campaign.

=== Filming ===
The film was shot in Canada. Filming started and concluded in July 2015.

== Soundtrack ==
August Cinjun Tate composed music for the film. Additionally, a compilation album of music featured in the film was released digitally and physically by iTunes and CD Baby on October 20, 2016.

No.	Title	Artist	Length
1.	"Lashes"	Jeff Hamilton	3:40
2.	"Black Sand"	Joe Firstman	2:48
3.	"Fish On A Hook"	Wild Rivers	4:18
4.	"Clean It Up"	Michael Cram	3:08
5.	"You Will Not Say"	Symphony Of Nine	3:58
6.	"A Long Way Down"	Joe Firstman	2:54
7.	"Everything Moves"	Morgan Woods	2:57
8.	"Pink Azaleas"	Forgotten 45's	4:16
9.	"Called To The Wave"	Danny Shipley	3:34
10.	"We Luv The Sunshine"	Snippet	3:10
11.	"Gone"	Morgan Woods	3:46
12.	"Your Heart Belongs To You"	Lyne Tremblay	3:20
13.	"Hum"	Joe Firstman	3:09
14.	"Fever Dream"	More Than Skies	4:41
15.	"Everywhere You Are"	That Noise	3:52
16.	"Cracker Jacks"	Amy Jo Johnson	3:47
Total length:			53:58
