= Paul Amos =

Welsh actor and Web series producer

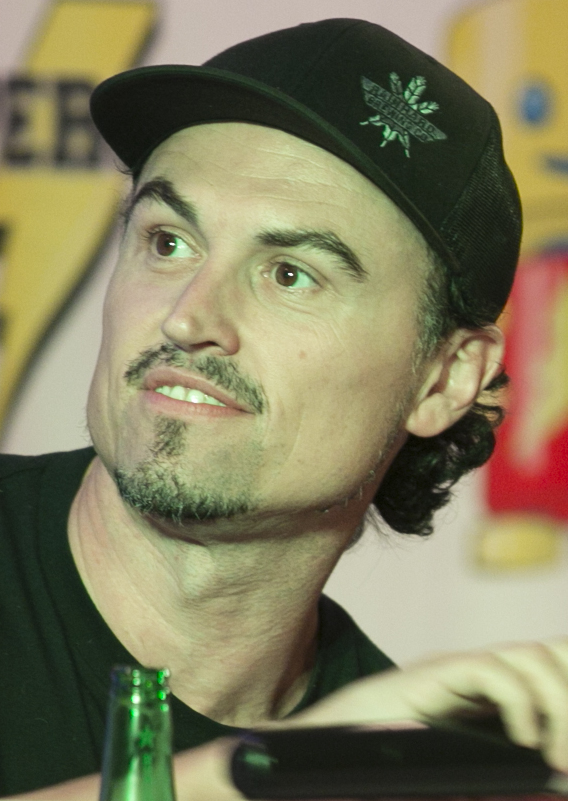
- Amos at Animate Florida in 2017
- Born: Paul Roger Amos; 6 March 1976 (age 50); Pencoed, Wales
- Education: 1997–2000 LAMDA
- Occupations: Actor, producer
- Known for: Lost Girl
- Spouse: Danielle Brodhagen (m. 2016)
- Children: 1

Paul Roger Amos (born 6 March 1976) is a Welsh actor and web series producer, currently based in Canada. He is most noted for his recurring role as Vex in the television series Lost Girl, and as the voice of Jacob Frye in the Assassin's Creed video game franchise.

== Life and career ==
Amos was born in Pencoed, Wales. He went to the Welsh school Ysgol Gyfun Llanhari. Later he studied acting at the National Youth Theatre of Great Britain and the London Academy of Music and Dramatic Art (LAMDA). In 2005, he moved to Toronto, Canada. He now lives in Stratford, Ontario.

He married Danielle Brodhagen in 2016 and they have a daughter, Elloise.

Amos is a supporter of Welsh independence.

== Filmography ==
Key
| † | Denotes projects that have not yet been released |

=== Film ===
| Year | Title | Role | Notes | Ref. |
|---|---|---|---|---|
| 2009 | Degrassi Goes Hollywood | Mick | Television film | |
| 2010 | Abroad | Hugh | Television film | |
| 2010 | Nexus: The Drug Conspiracy | David | | |
| 2010 | Forbidden Fruit | Serpent | Short film | |
| 2012 | Seven Years | Victor | Short film | |
| 2013 | Long Gone Day | Richter | | |
| 2013 | Sex After Kids | Peyton | | |
| 2014 | Bastards | Grover | Short film | |
| 2015 | Gridlocked | Young Officer | Uncredited | |
| 2016 | Duty Calls | Bartender | Short film | |
| 2017 | Titsh | Seth | Short film | |
| 2017 | Darken | Wren | | |
| 2020 | The Corruption of Divine Providence | Francis of Assisi | | |
| 2023 | Escalation | Perry | | |
| 2024 | Sway | Rez | | |
| TBA | Steal Away † | Clifford Vetter | Pre-production | |

=== Television ===
| Year | Title | Role | Notes | Ref. |
|---|---|---|---|---|
| 2003–2004 | Jacob's Ladder | Gideon / King David | Series regular | |
| 2004 | Casualty | Karl Sands | Episode: "World Gone Wrong" | |
| 2009 | Degrassi: The Next Generation | Mick | Episode: "Paradise City" | |
| 2009–2012 | Murdoch Mysteries | Dr. Roberts | Recurring role; 5 episodes | |
| 2010 | Aaron Stone | U | Recurring role; 4 episodes | |
| 2010–2015 | Lost Girl | Vex | Series regular; 24 episodes | |
| 2011 | Warehouse 13 | Charles Wells | Episode: "3... 2... 1" | |
| 2011 | Combat Hospital | Edward Hill | Episode: "Reason to Believe" | |
| 2012 | Mudpit | Atticus T. Rain | Episode: "We Don't Need No Shreducation" | |
| 2016 | Mayday | First Officer McLelland | Episode: "Choosing Sides" | |
| 2017 | Workin' Moms | James | Episode: "Fem Card" | |
| 2017 | Designated Survivor | Darius Cray | Episode: "Suckers" | |
| 2017 | Frankie Drake Mysteries | Richard Scanlon | Episode: "Ladies in Red" | |
| 2018 | Darken: Before the Dark | Wren | Series regular; 7 episodes | |
| 2021 | Jupiter's Legacy | Barnabas Wolfe | Episode: "What's the Use?" | |
| 2023 | Daniel Spellbound | Kel | Episode: "The Tickle Pit" | |

=== Video games ===
| Year | Title | Role | Notes | Ref. |
|---|---|---|---|---|
| 2015 | Assassin's Creed Syndicate | Jacob Frye | also, 3 story expansion packs | |
| 2020 | Assassin's Creed Valhalla | King Rhodri | | |
| 2021 | The Vale: Shadow of the Crown | The Baker | | |
