= Pursuit of Happiness (film) =

- Directed by: John Putch
- Screenplay by: John Zaring
- Produced by: Alex Hyde-White; John Zaring
- Starring: Frank Whaley; Annabeth Gish; Amy Jo Johnson
- Cinematography: Ross Berryman
- Edited by: Vanick Moradian
- Music by: Alexander Baker; Clair Marlo
- Production company: Martindale Group
- Distributed by: Showcase Entertainment
- Release date: 2001
- Running time: 93 minutes
- Country: United States
- Language: English

Pursuit of Happiness is a 2001 American romantic comedy film written by John Zaring, directed by John Putch and starring Frank Whaley, Annabeth Gish and Amy Jo Johnson.

== Cast ==
- Frank Whaley as Alan
- Annabeth Gish as Marissa
- Amy Jo Johnson as Tracy
- Patrick Van Horn as Mike
- Cress Williams as Ace
- Liz Vassey as Renee
- Alex Hyde-White as Paul
- Dawn Eason as Janet
- Jenn Gross as Sally
- Adam Baldwin as Chad Harmon
- Jean Stapleton as Lorraine

== Reception ==
Robert Koehler of Variety gave the film a negative review, describing it as "weak and banal."

Kevin Crust of the Los Angeles Times also gave the film a negative review and wrote, "Unfortunately, the film also shares that most common of mainstream flaws, a malnourished script."

Doug Brunell of Film Threat gave the film a positive review and wrote, "This is the real deal, and it is perfect for people tired of the clichés and Hollywood-perfect endings."
