= She Never Died =

- Directed by: Audrey Cummings
- Screenplay by: Jason Krawczyk
- Produced by: Zach Hagen; Bill Marks; Jennifer Mesich
- Starring: Oluniké Adeliyi; Peter MacNeill; Kiana Madeira; Michelle Nolden; Noah Dalton Danby
- Cinematography: Ian Macmillan
- Edited by: Michael P. Mason
- Music by: Jim McGrath
- Production companies: A71 Productions; Alternate Ending Studios
- Release dates: 19 September 2019 (Cinéfest); 14 April 2020
- Running time: 89 minutes
- Country: Canada
- Language: English

She Never Died is a 2019 Canadian horror comedy film directed by Audrey Cummings and written by Jason Krawczyk. The movie is seen by critics as a follow-up sister-sequel to Krawczyk's 2015 movie He Never Died, which starred Henry Rollins, although the creator and director of the first film Krawcyzk has stated it is a remake. It is set within the same universe. Krawczyk had initially intended the 2015 film to be expanded into a miniseries and follow-up film, but repurposed the script into She Never Died after the endeavor was cancelled.

This iteration stars Oluniké Adeliyi in a role similar to Rollins' character Jack, playing a mysterious recluse with a hunger for human flesh and a talent for violence. Noah Dalton Danby and Michelle Nolden play the film's main antagonists, while Peter MacNeill and Kiana Madeira star as a grizzled detective and innocent bystander.

The film premiered at the Cinéfest Sudbury International Film Festival on 19 September 2019.

== Plot ==
In a city plagued by human trafficking, an inhumanly strong woman named Lacey enters to foil a late-night abduction, devouring the attacker in a flood of screams and allowing the victim to flee.

The tired and aging Detective Godfrey leaves the police station to continue his one-man investigation of a comfortably sinister character called Terrance, whom he suspects to be in charge of a trafficking operation. He takes up a surveillance post in an abandoned warehouse district, where a disheveled Lacey has also been waiting for the suspect to arrive. With apparent disregard for the detective's presence, she forces entrance into the compound. Inside, a young man is being forced into a game of Russian roulette between himself and a chained dog for the entertainment of a live-streamed audience. Lacey interrupts to kill the man and savagely remove his eyes for a snack, apparently unaffected by a gunshot to her head. The man who shot her flees in terror and later finds his boss, Terrance, engaged in his own game of torture. Both returning to the scene, they find the body dismembered and the incident recorded; meanwhile, Lacey leaves frustrated, ignoring Godfrey as he enters to discover what has happened.

Later on that evening, the antisocial Lacey finds refuge in a boring diner, seeking only oatmeal and tea. While Godfrey returns home in disbelief at the previous massacre, Terrance shows the footage of Lacey to his boss and sibling, Meredith. The pair, comically comfortable in their criminal enterprise, plot to capture Lacey in order to profit off of her abilities.

On the next day, Godfrey returns to find Lacey and the two decide to talk at the diner. Lacey is forthcoming about her cannibalistic needs that she claims to satisfy only by eating evil people – in this case, Terrance. Godfrey realises Lacey is his only hope in exacting retribution, so he offers her up targets in exchange for a place to stay. Lacey promptly finds and kills two of these targets in a suspicious apartment and, after conferring with Godfrey, she returns to release their detainee, Suzzie. Though initially afraid, Suzzie follows Lacey to the diner, in awe of her abilities. The bubbly Suzzie is intent on staying with Lacey and becoming her friend, while Lacey struggles to resist the voices compelling her to kill Suzzie.

Godfrey heads off to investigate the apartment where Terrance finds and captures him, winding up strapped to a chair in the company of Meredith. After a casual conversation, she then leaves Terrance to interrogate Godfrey for Lacey's whereabouts. Terrance and a crony then track down Lacey, who is indifferent to being beaten and captured, taking her back to their compound to be heavily restrained. Suzzie, who has witnessed Lacey's abduction, seeks Godfrey's help at the police station, where only the desk sergeant is concerned enough to help; all the while, the criminal siblings are beginning to experiment on Lacey for their amusement. A concerned and reckless Suzzie finds a way into the compound, passing through a party for the rich and powerful before finding and freeing Godfrey. Together they attempt to rescue an impaled Lacey who erupts into a rage of power to decapitate Terrance and wreak havoc on the party, a rampage that concludes with Meredith being thrown off the rooftop to her death.

Much later, a retired Godfrey runs into Lacey at the laundromat. During a friendly farewell, they exchange first names, revealing Lacey to really be Lilith. After Godfrey leaves, the haunting "man in the hat" finally appears clearly to Lacey, so she addresses her frustration about immortality to him, assuming him to be God. The film ends foreboding an apocalypse, as revealed to Godfrey at home by yet another bulletproof character.

The ending shot is of four motorcycle license plates that reference the Book of Revelation and the Four Horsemen of the Apocalypse. This was alluded to at the beginning by the "pantless" man in the cell that speaks to Godfrey.

== Cast ==
- Oluniké Adeliyi as Lacey / Lilith
- Peter MacNeill as Godfrey
- Kiana Madeira as Suzzie
- Michelle Nolden as Meredith
- Noah Dalton Danby as Terrance
- Edsson Morales as Jerry
- Katie Messina as Janice
- Murray Furrow as Vaughn
- Lawrence Gowan as Man in the Hat
- Nick Stojanovic as Driver Dan

== Reception ==
=== Critical response ===
On the review aggregator website Rotten Tomatoes, 100% of 13 critics' reviews are positive, with an average rating of 7.5/10.. Ian Sedensky of Culture Crypt gave the film an 80/100, summarising it as "...an updated, unusual experience in abnormality whose mundane moments are punctuated by sparks of savage horror and slow strokes of deadpan humour."

=== Awards ===
Year	Ceremony	Category	Nominee	Result
2019
2019	Another Hole in the Head Genre Film Festival	Audience Award	Audrey Cummings	Won
2019	Blood in the Snow Canadian Film Festival	Best Actress	Oluniké Adeliyi	Won
2019	Blood in the Snow Canadian Film Festival	Vanguard Award	Audrey Cummings	Won
2019	New York City Horror Film Festival	Best Director	Audrey Cummings	Won
2019	Nightmares Film Festival	Best Thriller Feature	Audrey Cummings	Nominated
2019	Nightmares Film Festival	Best Cinematography Feature	Ian Macmillan	Nominated
2019	Nightmares Film Festival	Best Actress Feature	Oluniké Adeliyi	Nominated
