= Secrets of Eden =

- Written by: Anne Meredith
- Directed by: Tawnia McKiernan
- Starring: John Stamos; Anna Gunn; Sonya Salomaa
- Music by: Lawrence Shragge
- Country of origin: United States
- Original language: English

Production
- Producers: Craig Anderson; Dean Schramm
- Cinematography: Michael Storey
- Running time: 85 minutes
- Production company: Craig Anderson Productions

Original release
- Release: February 4, 2012

Secrets of Eden is a 2012 suspense television film directed by Tawnia McKiernan, based on a book by Chris Bohjalian and published in 2010. The film was set and recorded in Toronto, Canada.

== Plot summary ==
Pastor Steven Drew's faith is shattered after one of his newly baptized members, Alice Hayward, is murdered by her abusive husband George, who then seems to commit suicide. The pastor meets an author/Detective, Catherine Benincasa, working on a book about angels who helps him face his demons, and the law. Evidence surfaces that there was an affair between Alice and Reverend Drew. Katie, the Haywards’ orphaned 15-year-old daughter, is the only key to uncover the disturbing secrets of what happened behind closed doors on that fateful night and the suffering they endured as a “not so perfect” family.

== Cast ==
- John Stamos as Pastor Steven Drew
- Anna Gunn as Detective Catherine Benincasa
- Sonya Salomaa as Alice Hayward
- Samantha Munro as Kate Hayward
- Athena Karkanis as Heather
- Lisa Ryder as Ginny McBradden
- Graham Abbey as George Hayward
- John Bourgeois as Jim Halm
- J. P. Manoux as Detective Emmet Walker
- John Robinson as Paul Benincasa
- Neil Foster as David Dennison
- Barry Flatman as Aaron Lance
- Jordan Todosey as Tina McBradden
