= Darken =

- Directed by: Audrey Cummings
- Written by: RJ Lackie
- Starring: Bea Santos; Oluniké Adeliyi; Christine Horne; Paul Amos; Ari Millen
- Production company: Shaftesbury Films
- Release date: 2017
- Running time: 86 minutes
- Country: Canada
- Language: English

Darken is a 2017 Canadian digital sci-fi/horror film, produced by Shaftesbury Films' Smokebomb Entertainment and directed by Audrey Cummings, released in 2017. It also stars Bea Santos, Oluniké Adeliyi, Christine Horne, Paul Amos, and Ari Millen. Natasha Negovanlis also makes a cameo appearance in the film.

In 2018, an 11-part limited digital series (acting as a prequel to the film), called DARKEN, Before the Dark was released on KindaTV, featuring Jodelle Ferland.
