= Oluniké Adeliyi =

Canadian actress (born 1977)

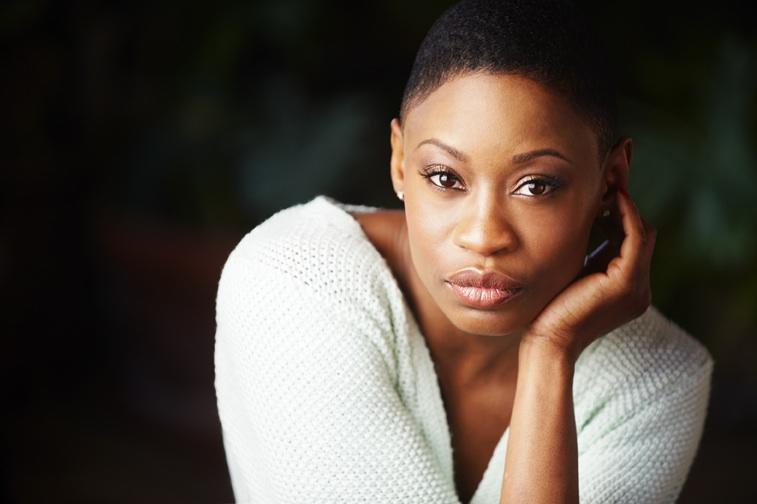
- Adeliyi in 2013
- Born: January 5, 1977 (age 49); Brampton, Ontario, Canada
- Occupation: Actress
- Years active: 1996–present

Oluniké Adeliyi (born January 5, 1977) is a Canadian actress. She appeared in the 2010 horror film Saw 3D and starred as Leah Kerns in the television series Flashpoint.

== Early life ==
Adeliyi was born in Brampton, Ontario, of Jamaican-Nigerian descent. She frequently visited Brooklyn, New York to pursue acting. She graduated from the American Academy of Dramatic Arts, performing in local theater, before returning to Toronto in 2008.

== Career ==
Adeliyi began acting when she was cast as the Artful Dodger in her middle school play Oliver Twist. After graduating high school, she went to the American Academy of Dramatic Arts in New York City, and has since performed in theatres throughout Canada and the U.S. playing leading roles in Blue Window, A Midsummer Night's Dream, The Children's Hour, Jitney, and Michael Cristofer's play The Shadow Box.

One of her earliest film roles was an uncredited bit part in the film John Q.; on set, she met Denzel Washington, who she said "inspired" her to continue pursuing acting. In 2009 she starred as the lead in the AfriCan Theatre Ensemble production of Efua Sutherland's The Marriage of Anansewa. Also that year, she starred in the Canadian TV series Flashpoint. She was nominated for Best Performance by a Female – Film at the 2012 Canadian Comedy Awards for her performance in French Immersion.

In 2014, Adeliyi was dubbed "Shakespeare’s First Jamaican-Nigerian Lady Macbeth" when she played the role at the Sterling Theatre in Toronto.

As of 2017, Adeliyi stars on the CBC series Workin' Moms.

In 2018, she received a Canadian Screen Award nomination for Best Supporting Actress at the 6th Canadian Screen Awards. She was nominated for her role in the film Boost.

== Personal life ==
=== Controversy ===
In 2017, Adeliyi attracted media attention in Canada after an incident at Toronto's Kingsway Theatre. The establishment does not allow backpacks into its theatre, and Adeliyi would not leave her backpack for safekeeping with theatre staff. The theatre staff refused to sell her a ticket, and when she refused to leave, the police were called. Adeliyi claimed she was discriminated against by the theatre staff, who filmed her, while the theatre staff claim they were following protocol. After police were called, Adeliyi was escorted out of the theatre. Adeliyi described the experience as "dehumanizing," and in an interview with the Toronto Star, she spoke further of the experience, saying:

I take offence to being labelled dangerous and that is what happened . . . When things happen like that, it can go any way, and people can get hurt . . . it compromises the person who [is] accused of something, and that is not fair.

Theatre owner Rui Pereira described Adeliyi as "abusive", saying she "slammed her bag on the counter and demanded a ticket", and then refused to leave when told to by staff.

== Filmography ==
=== Film ===
Year	Title	Role	Notes
2002	John Q	Insurance Rep	
2002	Undercover Brother	Bank Patron	
2004	New York Minute	Big Shirl's Beautician	
2010	Saw 3D	Sidney	
2010	Book Club	Pattie	Short
2010	Two Cities	Mpumi	Short
2011	French Immersion	Aretha	
2013	Three Days in Havana	Night	
2013	The Returned	Return Unit Nurse	
2013	Half Way Home	(voice)	Short
2014	Agape	Veronica	Short
2015	A Christmas Horror Story	Kim Peters	
2016	Boost	Amina Nour	
2017	The Drop In	Grace	Short
2017	Darken	Kali	
2017	The Emissary	Ren	Short
2018	GUION	Linda Bluford	Short
2018	The Parting Glass	Sue	
2018	Deep Space	Julianna Black	
2019	The Prodigy	Rebecca	
2019	ShoeGazer	Wanda	Short
2019	Tammy's Always Dying	Pascal	
2019	She Never Died	Lacey	
2020	Promise Me	Yolonda Thomas	Short
2020	Akilla's Escape	Thetis	
2020	Sila	Yaz Haiti	Short
2021	Chaos Walking	Piper	
2021	Cinema of Sleep	Omoni	
2022	Puppy	The Rescuer	Short
2023	Backspot	Denise	
2023	Doubles	Dr. Lockett	
2024	Morningside	Fi	
2024	The Fire Inside	Jackie Shields	
2024	Village Keeper	Jean	
2025	Youngblood	Ruby Youngblood	
2025	It Comes in Waves	Sonia	

=== Television ===
Year	Title	Role	Notes
2003	Blue Murder	Hooker #2	Episode: "Ambush"
2003	DoUlike2watch.com	Charisma	TV movie
2008	The Border	Aide	Episode: "Going Dark"
2009–12	Flashpoint	Cst. Leah Kerns	Recurring cast (seasons 2–3), main cast (season 5)
2011	Who Is Simon Miller?	Jasmine	TV movie
2011	Combat Hospital	Yolanda Cullerne	Episode: "Brothers in Arms"
2012	Being Human	Cecilia	Recurring cast (season 2)
2012	The Listener	Rebecca Kalb	Episode: "Poisoned Minds"
2013	Cracked	Solange Oowuszhu	Episode: "Faces"
2013	Her Husband's Betrayal	Officer Bobby Lee	TV movie
2014	Republic of Doyle	Harley Denief	Recurring cast (season 5)
2014	Remedy	Gabby	Episode: "Bad Blood"
2014	Odd Squad	DJ K-Berg	Episode: "Blob on the Job/Party of 5,4,3,2,1"
2015	Saving Hope	Tammy "Armageddon" Jenkins	Episode: "The Parent Trap"
2015	A Wish Come True	Abby	TV movie
2015	Lost Girl	Suri Middleton	Episode: "Like Father, Like Daughter"
2016	Killjoys	Artura Senbek	Episode: "Heart-Shaped Box"
2016	Group Home	Mrs. Rice	TV movie
2017	Taken Too Far	Officer Daniels	TV movie
2017	The Girlfriend Experience	-	Episode: "Donors"
2017–21	Workin' Moms	Giselle Bois	Recurring cast (seasons 1–5)
2018	Deep Six	Julianne	Main cast
2019	Little Dog	Phyllis Smallwood	Recurring cast: season 2
2019	Titans	Matti Matisse	Episode: "Bruce Wayne"
2019	Frankie Drake Mysteries	Etta Rose	Episode: "Ward of the Roses"
2019–21	American Gods	Shadow's Mom	Recurring cast (season 2), guest (season 3)
2020	Coroner	Noor Armias	Main cast (season 2)
2020	Transplant	Makayla	Episode: "Under Pressure"
2020–21	The Expanse	Karal	Recurring cast (season 5)
2021	Guilty Party	Yvette	Episode: "A Denver Ten"
2021	Revenge Delivered	Victoria Brooks	TV movie
2022	Revenge of the Black Best Friend	Dr. Toni Shakur	Main cast
2022	The Porter	Queenie	Main cast
2022	Mike	Lorna Mae	3 episodes
2023	Ruby and the Well	Henrietta Hartmaan	Episode: "I Wish He Knew the Whole Story"
2025	Murdoch Mysteries	Lucille Roberts	Episode: "Unearthing the Past"
2026	Possession	Patsy Dawkins	3 episodes

=== Video games ===
Year	Title	Role	Notes
2014	Watch Dogs	Donna 'Poppy' Dean (voice)	
2019	Tom Clancy's Ghost Recon Breakpoint	Cpt Maya Coleman (voice)	
2020	Hyper Scape	Ultimate Grace (voice)	
