= Amy Jo Johnson =

American and Canadian actress, musician, and filmmaker (born 1970)

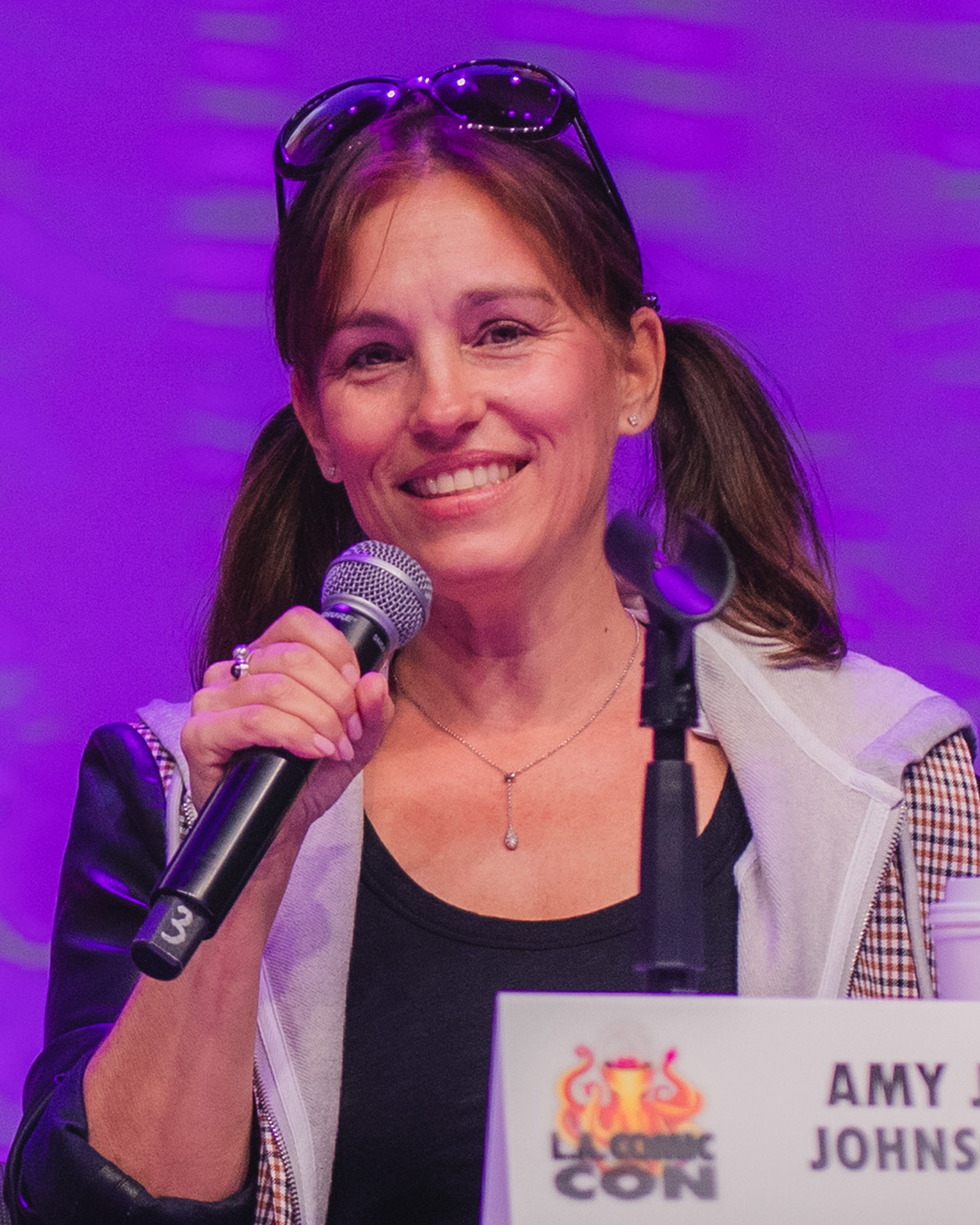
- Johnson in 2023
- Born: October 6, 1970 (age 56); Hyannis, Massachusetts, U.S.
- Citizenship: United States (1970–present); Canada (2015–present)
- Occupations: Actress; musician; filmmaker
- Years active: 1993–present
- Known for: Mighty Morphin Power Rangers; Felicity; Flashpoint
- Spouse: Olivier Giner (m. 2009; div. 2017)
- Children: 1

Amy Jo Johnson (born October 6, 1970) is an American and Canadian actress, musician, and filmmaker. As an actress, Johnson is best known for her roles as Kimberly Hart on Mighty Morphin Power Rangers (1993–1995), Julie Emrick on Felicity (1998–2000), and Jules Callaghan on Flashpoint (2008–2012).

Johnson's credits as a director include the short films Bent (2013) and Lines (2014), along with two feature-length films, The Space Between (2016) and Tammy's Always Dying (2019). In music, she has released four studio albums: The Trans-American Treatment (2001), Imperfect (2005), Never Broken (2013), and an EP, Still Here (2024). Her original music has been featured on Felicity and Flashpoint, and in other productions.

== Early life ==
Amy Jo Johnson was born on October 6, 1970, in Hyannis, Massachusetts, the daughter of Greig Johnson Sr., a car salesman, and Christine Johnson (d. 1998), a clothing store manager. She has two siblings, a brother and a sister.

== Career ==
=== Acting ===
Johnson moved to New York City at 18 to pursue an acting career. She attended the Lee Strasberg Theatre Institute and the American Musical and Dramatic Academy. She later moved to Los Angeles to audition for her first part.

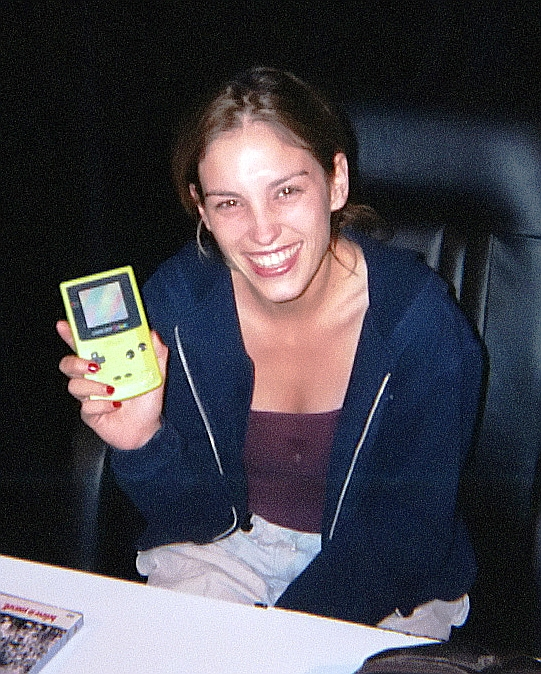
Johnson in 2000

Johnson's breakthrough role came a little over six months after she moved to Los Angeles, when she was selected to portray Kimberly Hart, the Pink Ranger, in Mighty Morphin Power Rangers, the first installment of the Power Rangers franchise. Her time during the series also included her first film, Mighty Morphin Power Rangers: The Movie. Despite the series being a huge success and having brought Johnson international recognition as an actress, the show brought her little financial security, as she and the others were paid only $600 a week for their work on the show, which included stunt work, and public appearances; none of the cast received any royalty payments from re-runs of episodes they appeared in. During Johnson's time with the franchise, whose productions were non-union and not subject to safety codes standardized in union contracts, Johnson faced multiple instances of danger of physical harm; while filming the television series, she was almost set on fire during a stunt, and during Turbo: A Power Rangers Movie, she was almost electrocuted. Johnson ultimately made the decision to leave the show in 1995, passing the role of the Pink Ranger to Australian actress Catherine Sutherland. In an appearance on I Love the '90s, Johnson jokingly stated that having been the Pink Power Ranger was something she would "never live down." In later years, Johnson stated that becoming famous from the show was at times overwhelming and had given her nightmares, but that overall, she learned many things and is grateful to the show and her fans. In all, Johnson has appeared in 138 episodes and 3 films in the franchise. She, alongside former co-star Jason David Frank, made a cameo appearance in the 2017 film Power Rangers, though not as a Power Ranger. In January 2023, Johnson announced that she had declined to reprise the role of Kimberly Hart in the 30th anniversary Power Rangers special, Mighty Morphin Power Rangers: Once & Always, on Netflix but that she wished the special and her former co-stars well while also saying that she had other fun things in store for her fans that year. Two months later, she denied claims that money was the sole reason why she chose not to participate in the special. In the fourth quarter of 2023, it was announced Johnson would release a four-issue comic book series as her gift to the fans for the 30th anniversary Power Rangers celebration, titled Mighty Morphin Power Rangers: The Return, distributed by Boom! Studios.

After she left the series in November 1995, Johnson went on to star in Disney Channel's Susie Q and in the Saved by the Bell: The New Class episode "Backstage Pass." In 1997, she starred in NBC's adaptation of Lois Duncan's novel Killing Mr. Griffin and played a gymnast with an eating disorder in Perfect Body. Johnson also participated in the film Without Limits. She also reprised her role as Kimberly Hart in Turbo: A Power Rangers Movie.

In September 1998, Johnson was invited to play Julie Emrick in The WB series Felicity. She held a main role on Felicity for three seasons and was a special guest in its fourth and final season.

In the early 2000s, Johnson had roles in Interstate 60, Pursuit of Happiness, and Infested, as well as television film Hard Ground. She also had guest starring roles on Spin City and ER. In 2004, she starred as Stacy Reynolds in the fourth season of The Division. In the latter half of the decade, she had recurring roles in Wildfire and What About Brian, and she starred in television films Magma: Volcanic Disaster on Syfy and Fatal Trust on Lifetime. In addition, Johnson took parts in a few independent films: Veritas, Prince of Truth and Islander.

Beginning in 2008, Johnson became a series regular on Flashpoint as Constable Jules Callaghan, a member of the fictional Strategic Response Unit of the Toronto Police service. She was nominated for a Gemini Award for her performance. The show aired new episodes through 2012.

Since 2012, Johnson has had guest roles on a few shows including a recurring role as Hayley Price in the Universal spy drama series Covert Affairs.

=== Directing ===
Johnson has directed and produced two acclaimed short films: Bent (2013) and Lines (2014). She then went on to direct the feature film The Space Between. In 2018, she began working on her next film, Tammy's Always Dying. The movie received praise from critics, particularly for Huffman's and Phillips' performances. It is available at video on demand release on May 1, 2020.

She is a member of Film Fatales, a non-profit organization that advocates for women's parity in the entertainment industry. In mid-2021, she announced she would be directing an episode of Superman & Lois for the show's second season.

=== Music ===
Johnson is a singer-songwriter and has released four albums: The Trans-American Treatment (2001), Imperfect (2005), Never Broken (2013), and an EP titled Still Here (2024). She has performed in the Los Angeles area with the Amy Jo Johnson Band. In December 2007, she contributed guest vocals to Koishii & Hush's cover of The Cars track "Since You're Gone", which was released as a single. The song is also part of the album Souvenirs, released in 2008.

Some of Johnson's music has been featured on television shows. Johnson's character in Felicity was originally described as a dancer, but with Johnson's input, the producers rewrote the character as a singer and guitarist. As a result, Johnson was able to perform her own song, "Puddle of Grace", on the show. This song was included in the album Felicity Soundtrack (1999) successfully released by Hollywood Records. As a result of the reception of the song, another Johnson song, "Clear Blue Day", was also featured on the show. In The Division, her song "Cat in the Snow" is the theme song from one of the episodes. In Flashpoint, her songs "Dancing In-Between" and "Goodbye" were featured.

In 2013, she performed the song "God" in her movie Bent. In 2014, her song "Lines" had featured in her short film Lines. Her 2017 song "Cracker Jacks" was the theme song from the movie The Space Between.

== Personal life ==
Johnson was married to Olivier Giner. The couple married in 2009 but filed for divorce in 2017. They have one child, a daughter, born in 2008. Johnson resides in Toronto, Ontario, Canada, and became a Canadian citizen on June 23, 2015, making her a dual citizen of the United States and Canada.

== Filmography ==
=== Film ===
Year	Title	Role	Notes
1995	Mighty Morphin Power Rangers: The Movie	Kimberly Hart / Pink Ranger	
1997	Turbo: A Power Rangers Movie	Kimberly Hart	
1998	Without Limits	Iowa's Finest	
1999	Cold Hearts	Alicia	
2001	Liars Club	Karen	
2001	Pursuit of Happiness	Tracy	
2002	Infested	Jesse	
2002	Interstate 60	Laura	
2006	Islander	Cheryl	
2007	Veritas, Prince of Truth	Marty Williams	
2011	Summer Song	Jenni	
2012	Tiger Eyes	Gwen Wexler	
2013	Coming Home for Christmas	Wendy O'Brien	Direct-to-video
2016	The Space Between	Amelia	Also director, writer and producer
2017	Power Rangers	Angel Grove citizen	Cameo
2018	Between Waves	Sherri	
2019	Tammy's Always Dying	N/A	Director

=== Television ===
Year	Title	Role	Notes
1993–1995	Mighty Morphin Power Rangers	Kimberly Hart / Pink Ranger	Main role
1995	The Eddie Files	Cindy	Episode: "The Counting Principle: Eddie in Barbieland"
1996	Saved by the Bell: The New Class	Linda	Episode: "Backstage Pass"
1996	Susie Q	Susie Quinn / Maggie	Television film
1997	Killing Mr. Griffin	Susan McConnell	Television film
1997	Perfect Body	Andie Bradley	Television film
1998–2000, 2002	Felicity	Julie Emrick	Main role (seasons 1–3); guest (season 4)
1999	Sweetwater	Nansi Nevins	Television film
2001	ER	Jill	Episode: "Partly Cloudy, Chance of Rain"
2001	Night Visions	Sara	Episode: "Rest Stop/After Life"
2002	Spin City	Stephanie	Episode: "Sex, Lies and Video Date"
2003	Hard Ground	Elizabeth Kennedy	Television film
2004	The Division	Stacy Reynolds	Main role (season 4)
2004	I Love the '90s	Herself	1 episode
2005–2007	Wildfire	Tina Sharp	Recurring role (seasons 1–3)
2006	Fatal Trust	Kate	Television film
2006	Magma: Volcanic Disaster	Brianna Chapman	Television film
2006	What About Brian	Karen	3 episodes
2008–2012	Flashpoint	Jules Callaghan	Main role
2013	Cracked	Sydney Reid	Episode: "Night Terrors"
2014	Bookaboo	Herself	Episode: "The Talent Show"
2014	Covert Affairs	Hayley Price	Recurring role (season 5)
2019	The Has Been	Jordanna	Main role
2022	Superman & Lois	Director	Episode: "Tried and True"

=== Short films ===
Year	Title	Role	Notes
2013	Bent	Amelia	Director & writer
2014	Lines	N/A	Director & writer

== Discography ==
=== Studio albums ===
- The Trans-American Treatment (2001)
- Imperfect (2005)
- Never Broken (2013)
- Still Here - EP (2024)

=== As a featured performer ===
- "Clear Blue Day", "Puddle of Grace" from the series Felicity (1998)
- "Motherless Child", "What's Wrong", "Two Words", "In A Rainbow", "First Love", from the TV movie Sweetwater (1999)
- "Cat in the Snow" from series The Division (2004)
- "Goodbye", "Dancing in Between" from series Flashpoint (2008)
- "God" from the movie Bent (2013)
- "Lines" from the short Lines (2014)
- "Cracker Jacks" from the movie The Space Between (2016)

== Awards and nominations ==
Year	Award	Category	Nominated work	Result	Ref.
2000	Teen Choice Awards	TV Star Choice Sidekick	Felicity	Nominated	
2002	Slamdunk Film Festival	Best Actress	Pursuit of Happiness	Nominated	
2009	Gemini Awards	Best Actress in a Continuing Leading Dramatic Role	Flashpoint	Nominated	
2010	Monte-Carlo Television Festival	TV Best Actress	Flashpoint	Nominated	
2012	Monte-Carlo Television Festival	Outstanding Actress in a Drama Series	Flashpoint	Nominated	
2013	Long Island Film Festival	Shelly Award for Woman Filmmakers	Bent	Won	
2013	Toronto International Film Festival	Jury Award	Bent	Won	
2013	Women in Film and Television	Audience Choice	Bent	Won	
2014	Buffalo Niagara Film Festival	Best Canadian Short	Bent	Won	
2014	Toronto International Short Film Festival	Best Comedy	Lines	Won	
2015	Buffalo Niagara Film Festival	Best Actress	Lines	Won	
